= Men's foil at the 2019 World Fencing Championships =

- Venue: SYMA Sports and Conference Centre
- Location: Budapest, Hungary
- Dates: 17–20 July

Medalists
gold medal	Enzo Lefort	France
silver medal	Marcus Mepstead	Great Britain
bronze medal	Son Young-ki	South Korea
bronze medal	Dmitry Zherebchenko	Russia

The Men's foil competition at the 2019 World Fencing Championships was held on 20 July 2019. The qualification was held on 17 July.

== Draw ==
=== Finals ===
Semifinals
(United Kingdom) Marcus Mepstead	15
(South Korea) Son Young-ki	12
(Russia) Dmitry Zherebchenko	7
(France) Enzo Lefort	15

Final
(United Kingdom) Marcus Mepstead	6
(France) Enzo Lefort	15

=== Top half ===
==== Section 1 ====
Round of 64
(Italy) Alessio Foconi	9
(United Kingdom) Marcus Mepstead	15
(Czech Republic) Alexander Choupenitch	15
(Thailand) Chornnasun Mayakan	3
(Hungary) Dániel Dósa	15
(Germany) Luis Klein	12
(Russia) Timur Arslanov	15
(Russia) Aleksey Cheremisinov	14
(United States) Alexander Massialas	15
(Japan) Kyosuke Matsuyama	9
(Egypt) Alaaeldin Abouelkassem	15
(Georgia (country)) Luka Gaganidze	4
(Poland) Michał Siess	15
(Japan) Toshiya Saito	7
(Canada) Maximilien van Haaster	15
(France) Erwann Le Péchoux	10

Round of 32
(United Kingdom) Marcus Mepstead	15
(Czech Republic) Alexander Choupenitch	13
(Hungary) Dániel Dósa	12
(Russia) Timur Arslanov	15
(United States) Alexander Massialas	15
(Egypt) Alaaeldin Abouelkassem	8
(Poland) Michał Siess	15
(Canada) Maximilien van Haaster	7

Round of 16
(United Kingdom) Marcus Mepstead	15
(Russia) Timur Arslanov	9
(United States) Alexander Massialas	10
(Poland) Michał Siess	15

Quarterfinals
(United Kingdom) Marcus Mepstead	15
(Poland) Michał Siess	9

==== Section 2 ====
Round of 64
(United States) Gerek Meinhardt	11
(South Korea) Lee Kwang-hyun	15
(France) Julien Mertine	12
(Canada) Eli Schenkel	15
(Japan) Takahiro Shikine	13
(Brazil) Guilherme Toldo	15
(Hungary) András Németh	10
(United States) Nick Itkin	15
(South Korea) Heo Jun	15
(Georgia (country)) Lasha Galuashvili	7
(Germany) Peter Joppich	9
(Germany) Benjamin Kleibrink	15
(Australia) Sholto Douglas	15
(Canada) Blake Broszus	6
(South Korea) Son Young-ki	15
(United Kingdom) Richard Kruse	12

Round of 32
(South Korea) Lee Kwang-hyun	15
(Canada) Eli Schenkel	8
(Brazil) Guilherme Toldo	15
(United States) Nick Itkin	14
(South Korea) Heo Jun	11
(Germany) Benjamin Kleibrink	12
(Australia) Sholto Douglas	14
(South Korea) Son Young-ki	15

Round of 16
(South Korea) Lee Kwang-hyun	15
(Brazil) Guilherme Toldo	14
(Germany) Benjamin Kleibrink	9
(South Korea) Son Young-ki	15

Quarterfinals
(South Korea) Lee Kwang-hyun	11
(South Korea) Son Young-ki	15

=== Bottom half ===
==== Section 3 ====
Round of 64
(Italy) Daniele Garozzo	15
(Germany) Andre Sanita	10
(United Kingdom) Ben Peggs	8
(Netherlands) Daniel Giacon	15
(United Kingdom) James Davis	14
(France) Maxime Pauty	15
(Hungary) Bálint Mátyás
(Italy) Andrea Cassarà	DNF
(Russia) Timur Safin	15
(Portugal) Robert Moore	8
(Egypt) Mohamed Hassan	11
(Japan) Ryo Miyake	15
(Russia) Dmitry Zherebchenko	15
(Argentina) Augusto Servello	2
(Poland) Andrzej Rządkowski	9
(Hong Kong) Cheung Ka Long	15

Round of 32
(Italy) Daniele Garozzo	15
(Netherlands) Daniel Giacon	6
(France) Maxime Pauty	7
(Italy) Andrea Cassarà	15
(Russia) Timur Safin	14
(Japan) Ryo Miyake	15
(Russia) Dmitry Zherebchenko	15
(Hong Kong) Cheung Ka Long	5

Round of 16
(Italy) Daniele Garozzo	10
(Italy) Andrea Cassarà	15
(Japan) Ryo Miyake	5
(Russia) Dmitry Zherebchenko	15

Quarterfinals
(Italy) Andrea Cassarà	6
(Russia) Dmitry Zherebchenko	15

==== Section 4 ====
Round of 64
(Italy) Giorgio Avola	15
(Belgium) Stef Van Campenhout	10
(Latvia) Vitālijs Kuceba	7
(South Korea) Kim Dong-su	15
(Denmark) Thomas Berg	15
(Turkey) Martino Minuto	12
(China) Huang Mengkai	11
(France) Enzo Lefort	15
(Spain) Carlos Llavador	15
(Hong Kong) Cheung Siu Lun	4
(Ukraine) Klod Yunes	15
(Egypt) Mohamed Hamza	9
(Hong Kong) Ryan Choi	15
(China) Wu Bin	14
(Singapore) Kevin Chan	6
(United States) Race Imboden	15

Round of 32
(Italy) Giorgio Avola	11
(South Korea) Kim Dong-su	15
(Denmark) Thomas Berg	12
(France) Enzo Lefort	15
(Spain) Carlos Llavador	15
(Ukraine) Klod Yunes	14
(Hong Kong) Ryan Choi	15
(United States) Race Imboden	9

Round of 16
(South Korea) Kim Dong-su
(France) Enzo Lefort	DNF
(Spain) Carlos Llavador	11
(Hong Kong) Ryan Choi	15

Quarterfinals
(France) Enzo Lefort	15
(Hong Kong) Ryan Choi	10
