= Men's foil at the 2018 World Fencing Championships =

- Venue: Wuxi Sports Center Indoor Stadium
- Location: Wuxi, China
- Dates: 21 July (qualification); 24 July
- Competitors: 142 from 60 nations

Medalists
| gold medal | Alessio Foconi | Italy |
| silver medal | Richard Kruse | Great Britain |
| bronze medal | Heo Jun | South Korea |
| bronze medal | Carlos Llavador | Spain |

The Men's foil event of the 2018 World Fencing Championships was held on 24 July 2018. The qualification was held on 21 July 2018.

== Draw ==
=== Finals ===
Semifinals
(Italy) Alessio Foconi | 15
(South Korea) Heo Jun | 12
(United Kingdom) Richard Kruse | 15
(Spain) Carlos Llavador | 11

Final
(Italy) Alessio Foconi | 15
(United Kingdom) Richard Kruse | 8

=== Top half ===
==== Section 1 ====
Round of 64
(Italy) Alessio Foconi | 15
(Germany) Peter Joppich | 11
(Hong Kong) Cheung Siu Lun | 8
(Poland) Michał Siess | 15
(China) Wu Bin | 15
(Ukraine) Rostyslav Hertsyk | 12
(Canada) Maximilien van Haaster | 15
(Japan) Takahiro Shikine | 8
(Russia) Dmitry Zherebchenko | 10
(Algeria) Hamid Sintes | 11
(Brazil) Guilherme Toldo | 6
(France) Enzo Lefort | 15
(Egypt) Alaaeldin Abouelkassem | 15
(Denmark) Thomas Berg | 8
(Chile) Vicente Otayza | 4
(Russia) Aleksey Cheremisinov | 15

Round of 32
(Italy) Alessio Foconi | 15
(Poland) Michał Siess | 1
(China) Wu Bin | 12
(Canada) Maximilien van Haaster | 15
(Algeria) Hamid Sintes | 4
(France) Enzo Lefort | 15
(Egypt) Alaaeldin Abouelkassem | 15
(Russia) Aleksey Cheremisinov | 14

Round of 16
(Italy) Alessio Foconi | 15
(Canada) Maximilien van Haaster | 12
(France) Enzo Lefort | 15
(Egypt) Alaaeldin Abouelkassem | 12

Quarterfinals
(Italy) Alessio Foconi | 15
(France) Enzo Lefort | 8

==== Section 2 ====
Round of 64
(Italy) Daniele Garozzo | 15
(Australia) Edward Fitzgerald | 12
(Denmark) Alexander Tsoronis | 8
(South Korea) Son Young-ki | 15
(Japan) Kyosuke Matsuyama | 15
(Poland) Krystian Gryglewski | 5
(Germany) André Sanità | 9
(France) Erwann Le Péchoux | 15
(South Korea) Ha Tae-gyu | 7
(South Korea) Heo Jun | 13
(Czech Republic) Alexander Choupenitch | 15
(Poland) Andrzej Rządkowski | 13
(Germany) Alexander Kahl | 15
(Hong Kong) Nicholas Choi | 13
(China) Huang Mengkai | 15
(United States) Alexander Massialas | 13

Round of 32
(Italy) Daniele Garozzo | 15
(South Korea) Son Young-ki | 12
(Japan) Kyosuke Matsuyama | 7
(France) Erwann Le Péchoux | 15
(South Korea) Heo Jun | 15
(Czech Republic) Alexander Choupenitch | 8
(Germany) Alexander Kahl | 15
(China) Huang Mengkai | 12

Round of 16
(Italy) Daniele Garozzo | 15
(France) Erwann Le Péchoux | 6
(South Korea) Heo Jun | 15
(Germany) Alexander Kahl | 7

Quarterfinals
(Italy) Daniele Garozzo | 14
(South Korea) Heo Jun | 15

=== Bottom half ===
==== Section 3 ====
Round of 64
(United Kingdom) Richard Kruse | 15
(Israel) Maor Hatoel | 7
(Egypt) Mohamed Hamza | 11
(Russia) Timur Arslanov | 15
(Slovakia) Cedrik Serri | 3
(Turkey) Martino Minuto | 15
(Hong Kong) Choi Chun Yin Ryan | 8
(Hong Kong) Cheung Ka Long | 15
(United States) Gerek Meinhardt | 13
(Hungary) Dániel Dósa | 15
(South Korea) Lee Kwang-hyun | 15
(Japan) Kenta Suzumura | 7
(United Kingdom) James Davis | 15
(Australia) Sholto Douglas | 14
(Austria) Johannes Poscharnig | 8
(Italy) Andrea Cassarà | 15

Round of 32
(United Kingdom) Richard Kruse | 15
(Russia) Timur Arslanov | 11
(Turkey) Martino Minuto | 14
(Hong Kong) Cheung Ka Long | 15
(Hungary) Dániel Dósa | 12
(South Korea) Lee Kwang-hyun | 15
(United Kingdom) James Davis | 15
(Italy) Andrea Cassarà | 10

Round of 16
(United Kingdom) Richard Kruse | 15
(Hong Kong) Cheung Ka Long | 6
(South Korea) Lee Kwang-hyun | 7
(United Kingdom) James Davis | 15

Quarterfinals
(United Kingdom) Richard Kruse | 15
(United Kingdom) James Davis | 12

==== Section 4 ====
Round of 64
(Russia) Timur Safin | 15
(Netherlands) Daniel Giacon | 14
(Ukraine) Andrii Pogrebniak | 15
(Brazil) Julien Baneux | 13
(United States) Miles Chamley-Watson | 11
(Cyprus) Alex Tofalides | 15
(Spain) Carlos Llavador | 15
(Japan) Toshiya Saito | 8
(Italy) Giorgio Avola | 15
(Germany) Benjamin Kleibrink | 7
(United Kingdom) Marcus Mepstead | 7
(France) Maxime Pauty | 15
(France) Jérémy Cadot | 15
(China) Shi Jialuo | 12
(Ukraine) Klod Yunes | 9
(United States) Race Imboden | 15

Round of 32
(Russia) Timur Safin | 15
(Ukraine) Andrii Pogrebniak | 12
(Cyprus) Alex Tofalides | 12
(Spain) Carlos Llavador | 15
(Italy) Giorgio Avola | 15
(France) Maxime Pauty | 11
(France) Jérémy Cadot | 13
(United States) Race Imboden | 15

Round of 16
(Russia) Timur Safin | 13
(Spain) Carlos Llavador | 15
(Italy) Giorgio Avola | 15
(United States) Race Imboden | 11

Quarterfinals
(Spain) Carlos Llavador | 15
(Italy) Giorgio Avola | 10
