= Fencing at the 2018 Asian Games =

- Venue: Jakarta Convention Center
- Dates: 19–24 August 2018
- Competitors: 279 from 25 nations

Fencing at the 2018 Asian Games was held at Jakarta Convention Center, Jakarta, Indonesia, from 19 to 24 August 2018.

== Schedule ==
P	Pools	F	Finals

Event↓/Date →	19th Sun		20th Mon		21st Tue		22nd Wed	23rd Thu	24th Fri
Men's individual épée	P	F							
Men's team épée							F		
Men's individual foil					P	F			
Men's team foil									F
Men's individual sabre			P	F					
Men's team sabre								F	
Women's individual épée					P	F			
Women's team épée									F
Women's individual foil			P	F					
Women's team foil								F	
Women's individual sabre	P	F							
Women's team sabre							F		

== Medalists ==
=== Men ===
Event	Gold	Silver	Bronze
Individual épée	Dmitriy Alexanin; Kazakhstan	Park Sang-young; South Korea	Jung Jin-sun; South Korea
Individual épée	Dmitriy Alexanin; Kazakhstan	Park Sang-young; South Korea	Koki Kano; Japan
Team épée	Japan; Koki Kano; Kazuyasu Minobe; Satoru Uyama; Masaru Yamada	China; Dong Chao; Lan Minghao; Shi Gaofeng; Xue Yangdong	South Korea; Jung Jin-sun; Kweon Young-jun; Park Kyoung-doo; Park Sang-young
Team épée	Japan; Koki Kano; Kazuyasu Minobe; Satoru Uyama; Masaru Yamada	China; Dong Chao; Lan Minghao; Shi Gaofeng; Xue Yangdong	Kazakhstan; Dmitriy Alexanin; Elmir Alimzhanov; Ruslan Kurbanov; Vadim Sharlaimov
Individual foil	Huang Mengkai; China	Nicholas Choi; Hong Kong	Cheung Ka Long; Hong Kong
Individual foil	Huang Mengkai; China	Nicholas Choi; Hong Kong	Son Young-ki; South Korea
Team foil	South Korea; Ha Tae-gyu; Heo Jun; Lee Kwang-hyun; Son Young-ki	Hong Kong; Cheung Ka Long; Nicholas Choi; Ryan Choi; Yeung Chi Ka	Japan; Kyosuke Matsuyama; Toshiya Saito; Takahiro Shikine; Kenta Suzumura
Team foil	South Korea; Ha Tae-gyu; Heo Jun; Lee Kwang-hyun; Son Young-ki	Hong Kong; Cheung Ka Long; Nicholas Choi; Ryan Choi; Yeung Chi Ka	China; Huang Mengkai; Li Chen; Ma Jianfei; Shi Jialuo
Individual sabre	Gu Bon-gil; South Korea	Oh Sang-uk; South Korea	Low Ho Tin; Hong Kong
Individual sabre	Gu Bon-gil; South Korea	Oh Sang-uk; South Korea	Ali Pakdaman; Iran
Team sabre	South Korea; Gu Bon-gil; Kim Jun-ho; Kim Jung-hwan; Oh Sang-uk	Iran; Mojtaba Abedini; Farzad Baher; Ali Pakdaman; Mohammad Rahbari	Hong Kong; Cyrus Chang; Lam Hin Chung; Terence Lee; Low Ho Tin
Team sabre	South Korea; Gu Bon-gil; Kim Jun-ho; Kim Jung-hwan; Oh Sang-uk	Iran; Mojtaba Abedini; Farzad Baher; Ali Pakdaman; Mohammad Rahbari	China; Lu Yang; Wang Shi; Xu Yingming; Yan Yinghui

=== Women ===
Event	Gold	Silver	Bronze
Individual épée	Kang Young-mi; South Korea	Sun Yiwen; China	Choi In-jeong; South Korea
Individual épée	Kang Young-mi; South Korea	Sun Yiwen; China	Vivian Kong; Hong Kong
Team épée	China; Lin Sheng; Sun Yiwen; Xu Chengzi; Zhu Mingye	South Korea; Choi In-jeong; Kang Young-mi; Lee Hye-in; Shin A-lam	Japan; Haruna Baba; Shiori Komata; Kanna Oishi; Ayumi Yamada
Team épée	China; Lin Sheng; Sun Yiwen; Xu Chengzi; Zhu Mingye	South Korea; Choi In-jeong; Kang Young-mi; Lee Hye-in; Shin A-lam	Hong Kong; Chu Ka Mong; Kaylin Hsieh; Vivian Kong; Coco Lin
Individual foil	Jeon Hee-sook; South Korea	Fu Yiting; China	Liu Yan Wai; Hong Kong
Individual foil	Jeon Hee-sook; South Korea	Fu Yiting; China	Sera Azuma; Japan
Team foil	Japan; Sera Azuma; Komaki Kikuchi; Karin Miyawaki; Sumire Tsuji	China; Chen Qingyuan; Fu Yiting; Huo Xingxin; Shi Yue	South Korea; Chae Song-oh; Hong Seo-in; Jeon Hee-sook; Nam Hyun-hee
Team foil	Japan; Sera Azuma; Komaki Kikuchi; Karin Miyawaki; Sumire Tsuji	China; Chen Qingyuan; Fu Yiting; Huo Xingxin; Shi Yue	Singapore; Amita Berthier; Melanie Huang; Maxine Wong; Tatiana Wong
Individual sabre	Qian Jiarui; China	Shao Yaqi; China	Norika Tamura; Japan
Individual sabre	Qian Jiarui; China	Shao Yaqi; China	Kim Ji-yeon; South Korea
Team sabre	South Korea; Choi Soo-yeon; Hwang Seon-a; Kim Ji-yeon; Yoon Ji-su	China; Ma Yingjia; Qian Jiarui; Shao Yaqi; Yang Hengyu	Kazakhstan; Aibike Khabibullina; Tamara Pochekutova; Tatyana Prikhodko; Aigerim Sarybay
Team sabre	South Korea; Choi Soo-yeon; Hwang Seon-a; Kim Ji-yeon; Yoon Ji-su	China; Ma Yingjia; Qian Jiarui; Shao Yaqi; Yang Hengyu	Japan; Chika Aoki; Shihomi Fukushima; Risa Takashima; Norika Tamura

== Medal table ==
Rank	Nation	Gold	Silver	Bronze	Total
1	South Korea (KOR)	6	3	6	15
2	China (CHN)	3	6	2	11
3	Japan (JPN)	2	0	6	8
4	Kazakhstan (KAZ)	1	0	2	3
5	Hong Kong (HKG)	0	2	6	8
6	Iran (IRI)	0	1	1	2
7	Singapore (SGP)	0	0	1	1
Totals (7 entries)		12	12	24	48

== Participating nations ==
A total of 279 athletes from 25 nations competed in fencing at the 2018 Asian Games:

- Cambodia (3)
- China (24)
- Chinese Taipei (8)
- Hong Kong (24)
- India (4)
- Indonesia (24)
- Iran (11)
- Japan (24)
- Kazakhstan (17)
- Kuwait (1)
- Kyrgyzstan (5)
- Lebanon (4)
- Macau (5)
- Malaysia (7)
- Mongolia (9)
- Nepal (8)
- Pakistan (4)
- Philippines (8)
- Qatar (10)
- Singapore (13)
- South Korea (24)
- Thailand (18)
- United Arab Emirates (4)
- Uzbekistan (4)
- Vietnam (16)
