= Fencing at the 2014 Asian Games – Men's team foil =

Men's team foil at the 2014 Asian Games
- Venue: Goyang Gymnasium
- Date: 25 September 2014
- Competitors: 36 from 9 nations

Medalists
gold medal	Japan; Kenta Chida, Daiki Fujino, Ryo Miyake, Yuki Ota
silver medal	China; Chen Haiwei, Lei Sheng, Li Chen, Ma Jianfei
bronze medal	Hong Kong; Cheung Ka Long, Cheung Siu Lun, Nicholas Choi, Yeung Chi Ka
bronze medal	South Korea; Heo Jun, Kim Hyo-gon, Kim Min-kyu, Son Young-ki

The men's team foil competition at the 2014 Asian Games in Goyang was held on 25 September at the Goyang Gymnasium.

== Schedule ==
All times are Korea Standard Time (UTC+09:00)

Date	Time	Event
Thursday, 25 September 2014	12:30	Round of 16
Thursday, 25 September 2014	14:00	Quarterfinals
Thursday, 25 September 2014	15:30	Semifinals
Thursday, 25 September 2014	19:00	Gold medal match

== Seeding ==
The teams were seeded taking into account the results achieved by competitors representing each team in the individual event.

Rank	Team	Fencer		Total
Rank	Team	1	2	Total
1	China (CHN)	1	3	4
2	Japan (JPN)	3	6	9
2	South Korea (KOR)	2	7	9
4	Hong Kong (HKG)	5	10	15
5	Kuwait (KUW)	13	19	32
5	Qatar (QAT)	11	21	32
5	Singapore (SIN)	14	18	32
5	Thailand (THA)	12	20	32
9	Saudi Arabia (KSA)	15	22	37

== Results ==
Round of 16
9	Saudi Arabia	22
8	Qatar	41

Quarterfinals
1	China	45
8	Qatar	8
5	Kuwait	25
4	Hong Kong	45
3	South Korea	45
6	Singapore	21
7	Thailand	10
2	Japan	45

Semifinals
1	China	45
4	Hong Kong	30
3	South Korea	29
2	Japan	45

Gold medal match
1	China	42
3	Japan	45

== Final standing ==
Rank	Team
1st place, gold medalist(s)	Japan (JPN); Kenta Chida; Daiki Fujino; Ryo Miyake; Yuki Ota
2nd place, silver medalist(s)	China (CHN); Chen Haiwei; Lei Sheng; Li Chen; Ma Jianfei
3rd place, bronze medalist(s)	Hong Kong (HKG); Cheung Ka Long; Cheung Siu Lun; Nicholas Choi; Yeung Chi Ka
3rd place, bronze medalist(s)	South Korea (KOR); Heo Jun; Kim Hyo-gon; Kim Min-kyu; Son Young-ki
5	Kuwait (KUW); Abdulrahman Al-Arbeed; Ali Fadhel; Ali Khazaal; Yaser Mohammad
6	Singapore (SIN); Kevin Jerrold Chan; Joshua Lim; Wu Jie; Zhang Zhenggang
7	Thailand (THA); Sanphot Nuanphlap; Nontapat Panchan; Thapanun Phakungkoon; Suppakorn Sritangorn
8	Qatar (QAT); Ali Al-Asmi; Mohamed Al-Tairi; Nayef Hadram; Khalid Meshaab
9	Saudi Arabia (KSA); Ali Al-Binali; Eisa Al-Muqabqab; Mohammed Hazazi; Yahya Hazazi
