= 2017 Asian Fencing Championships =

- Host city: Hong Kong
- Dates: 15–20 June 2017
- Main venue: AsiaWorld–Expo

The 2017 Asian Fencing Championships were held in Hong Kong from 15 to 20 June 2017 at the AsiaWorld–Expo.

== Medal summary ==
=== Men ===
Event	Gold	Silver	Bronze
Individual épée	Ruslan Kurbanov; Kazakhstan	Kweon Young-jun; South Korea	Park Kyoung-doo; South Korea
Individual épée	Ruslan Kurbanov; Kazakhstan	Kweon Young-jun; South Korea	Jung Jin-sun; South Korea
Team épée	South Korea; Jung Jin-sun; Kweon Young-jun; Park Kyoung-doo; Park Sang-young	China; Lan Minghao; Li Zhen; Shi Gaofeng; Song Hongjie	Japan; Inochi Ito; Kazuyasu Minobe; Satoru Uyama; Masaru Yamada
Team épée	South Korea; Jung Jin-sun; Kweon Young-jun; Park Kyoung-doo; Park Sang-young	China; Lan Minghao; Li Zhen; Shi Gaofeng; Song Hongjie	Hong Kong; Fong Hoi Sun; Ho Sze Hou; Clarence Lai; Ng Ho Tin
Individual foil	Ha Tae-gyu; South Korea	Cheung Ka Long; Hong Kong	Son Young-ki; South Korea
Individual foil	Ha Tae-gyu; South Korea	Cheung Ka Long; Hong Kong	Chen Haiwei; China
Team foil	China; Chen Haiwei; Li Chen; Mo Ziwei; Shi Jialuo	South Korea; Ha Tae-gyu; Heo Jun; Kim Hyo-gon; Son Young-ki	Hong Kong; Cheung Ka Long; Cheung Siu Lun; Nicholas Choi; Yeung Chi Ka
Team foil	China; Chen Haiwei; Li Chen; Mo Ziwei; Shi Jialuo	South Korea; Ha Tae-gyu; Heo Jun; Kim Hyo-gon; Son Young-ki	Japan; Kyosuke Matsuyama; Riki Oishi; Toshiya Saito; Kenta Suzumura
Individual sabre	Gu Bon-gil; South Korea	Mohammad Rahbari; Iran	Ali Pakdaman; Iran
Individual sabre	Gu Bon-gil; South Korea	Mohammad Rahbari; Iran	Kim Jun-ho; South Korea
Team sabre	South Korea; Gu Bon-gil; Kim Jun-ho; Kim Jung-hwan; Oh Sang-uk	Iran; Mojtaba Abedini; Mohammad Fotouhi; Ali Pakdaman; Mohammad Rahbari	China; Liang Jianhao; Lu Yang; Wang Shi; Zhou Ziqiu
Team sabre	South Korea; Gu Bon-gil; Kim Jun-ho; Kim Jung-hwan; Oh Sang-uk	Iran; Mojtaba Abedini; Mohammad Fotouhi; Ali Pakdaman; Mohammad Rahbari	Hong Kong; Cyrus Chang; Aaron Ho; Lam Hin Chung; Low Ho Tin

=== Women ===
Event	Gold	Silver	Bronze
Individual épée	Kang Young-mi; South Korea	Vivian Kong; Hong Kong	Sun Yiwen; China
Individual épée	Kang Young-mi; South Korea	Vivian Kong; Hong Kong	Zhu Mingye; China
Team épée	China; Sun Yiwen; Xiang Yixuan; Xu Nuo; Zhu Mingye	South Korea; Choi In-jeong; Kang Young-mi; Shin A-lam; Song Se-ra	Japan; Haruna Baba; Kanna Oishi; Ayaka Shimookawa; Ayumi Yamada
Team épée	China; Sun Yiwen; Xiang Yixuan; Xu Nuo; Zhu Mingye	South Korea; Choi In-jeong; Kang Young-mi; Shin A-lam; Song Se-ra	Hong Kong; Chu Ka Mong; Debbie Ho; Vivian Kong; Coco Lin
Individual foil	Huo Xingxin; China	Nam Hyun-hee; South Korea	Jeon Hee-sook; South Korea
Individual foil	Huo Xingxin; China	Nam Hyun-hee; South Korea	Minami Kano; Japan
Team foil	South Korea; Hong Seo-in; Jeon Hee-sook; Kim Mi-na; Nam Hyun-hee	Japan; Sera Azuma; Minami Kano; Komaki Kikuchi; Shiho Nishioka	China; Fu Yiting; Huo Xingxin; Liu Yongshi; Wu Peilin
Team foil	South Korea; Hong Seo-in; Jeon Hee-sook; Kim Mi-na; Nam Hyun-hee	Japan; Sera Azuma; Minami Kano; Komaki Kikuchi; Shiho Nishioka	Hong Kong; Kimberley Cheung; Lau Cheuk Yu; Lin Po Heung; Liu Yan Wai
Individual sabre	Kim Ji-yeon; South Korea	Seo Ji-yeon; South Korea	Yu Xinting; China
Individual sabre	Kim Ji-yeon; South Korea	Seo Ji-yeon; South Korea	Misaki Emura; Japan
Team sabre	China; Fu Ying; Yang Hengyu; Yu Xinting; Zhang Xueqian	South Korea; Hwang Seon-a; Kim Ji-yeon; Seo Ji-yeon; Yoon Ji-su	Japan; Chika Aoki; Misaki Emura; Shihomi Fukushima; Norika Tamura
Team sabre	China; Fu Ying; Yang Hengyu; Yu Xinting; Zhang Xueqian	South Korea; Hwang Seon-a; Kim Ji-yeon; Seo Ji-yeon; Yoon Ji-su	Hong Kong; Au Sin Ying; Karen Chang; Jenny Ho; Lam Hin Wai

== Medal table ==
Rank	Nation	Gold	Silver	Bronze	Total
1	South Korea	7	6	5	18
2	China	4	1	6	11
3	Kazakhstan	1	0	0	1
4	Hong Kong	0	2	6	8
5	Iran	0	2	1	3
6	Japan	0	1	6	7
Totals (6 entries)		12	12	24	48

== Results ==
=== Men ===
==== Individual épée ====
Quarterfinals		Semifinals		Final
Elmir Alimzhanov (KAZ)	14
Kweon Young-jun (KOR)	15	Kweon Young-jun (KOR)	15
Park Kyoung-doo (KOR)	14	Park Kyoung-doo (KOR)	12
Chen Tsung-lin (TPE)	7			Kweon Young-jun (KOR)	10
Chuang Po-yu (TPE)	4			Ruslan Kurbanov (KAZ)	15
Ruslan Kurbanov (KAZ)	15	Ruslan Kurbanov (KAZ)	15
Jung Jin-sun (KOR)	15	Jung Jin-sun (KOR)	13
Dmitriy Alexanin (KAZ)	13

==== Team épée ====
Quarterfinals
South Korea	45
Uzbekistan	33
Hong Kong	45
Kazakhstan	43
China	45
Iran	30
Chinese Taipei	24
Japan	45

Semifinals
South Korea	45
Hong Kong	40
China	45
Japan	40

Final
South Korea	45
China	35
3rd place
Hong Kong	30
Japan	45

==== Individual foil ====
Quarterfinals		Semifinals		Final
Li Chen (CHN)	10
Cheung Ka Long (HKG)	15	Cheung Ka Long (HKG)	15
Son Young-ki (KOR)	15	Son Young-ki (KOR)	9
Kyosuke Matsuyama (JPN)	11			Cheung Ka Long (HKG)	11
Ha Tae-gyu (KOR)	15			Ha Tae-gyu (KOR)	15
Toshiya Saito (JPN)	9	Ha Tae-gyu (KOR)	15
Chen Haiwei (CHN)	13	Chen Haiwei (CHN)	12
Heo Jun (KOR)	12

==== Team foil ====
Quarterfinals
South Korea	45
Vietnam	25
Australia	40
Hong Kong	45
China	45
Singapore	21
Philippines	20
Japan	45

Semifinals
South Korea	45
Hong Kong	41
China	45
Japan	31

Final
South Korea	29
China	45
3rd place
Hong Kong	45
Japan	35

==== Individual sabre ====
Quarterfinals		Semifinals		Final
Gu Bon-gil (KOR)	15
Wang Shi (CHN)	13	Gu Bon-gil (KOR)	15
Mohammad Fotouhi (IRI)	12	Ali Pakdaman (IRI)	7
Ali Pakdaman (IRI)	15			Gu Bon-gil (KOR)	15
Oh Sang-uk (KOR)	10			Mohammad Rahbari (IRI)	8
Kim Jun-ho (KOR)	15	Kim Jun-ho (KOR)	13
Low Ho Tin (HKG)	7	Mohammad Rahbari (IRI)	15
Mohammad Rahbari (IRI)	15

==== Team sabre ====
Quarterfinals
South Korea	45
Singapore	11
Kazakhstan	29
China	45
Japan	40
Hong Kong	45
Chinese Taipei	26
Iran	45

Semifinals
South Korea	45
China	28
Hong Kong	28
Iran	45

Final
South Korea	45
Iran	42
3rd place
China	45
Hong Kong	34

=== Women ===
==== Individual épée ====
Quarterfinals		Semifinals		Final
Sun Yiwen (CHN)	15
Harlene Raguin (PHI)	11	Sun Yiwen (CHN)	13
Vivian Kong (HKG)	15	Vivian Kong (HKG)	15
Ayaka Shimookawa (JPN)	9			Vivian Kong (HKG)	12
Song Se-ra (KOR)	3			Kang Young-mi (KOR)	13
Kang Young-mi (KOR)	5	Kang Young-mi (KOR)	8
Shin A-lam (KOR)	12	Zhu Mingye (CHN)	7
Zhu Mingye (CHN)	15

==== Team épée ====
Quarterfinals
China	45
Vietnam	19
Australia	36
Hong Kong	45
Japan	45
Kazakhstan	44
Chinese Taipei	32
South Korea	45

Semifinals
China	45
Hong Kong	37
Japan	37
South Korea	45

Final
China	34
South Korea	30
3rd place
Hong Kong	41
Japan	45

==== Individual foil ====
Quarterfinals		Semifinals		Final
Jeon Hee-sook (KOR)	15
Sera Azuma (JPN)	7	Jeon Hee-sook (KOR)	11
Hong Seo-in (KOR)	9	Huo Xingxin (CHN)	12
Huo Xingxin (CHN)	10			Huo Xingxin (CHN)	15
Wu Peilin (CHN)	9			Nam Hyun-hee (KOR)	6
Minami Kano (JPN)	15	Minami Kano (JPN)	11
Nam Hyun-hee (KOR)	15	Nam Hyun-hee (KOR)	15
Shiho Nishioka (JPN)	8

==== Team foil ====
Quarterfinals
South Korea	45
Vietnam	18
Singapore	43
Hong Kong	44
China	40
Chinese Taipei	23
Philippines	22
Japan	45

Semifinals
South Korea	45
Hong Kong	34
China	24
Japan	45

Final
South Korea	45
Japan	30
3rd place
Hong Kong	26
China	39

==== Individual sabre ====
Quarterfinals		Semifinals		Final
Seo Ji-yeon (KOR)	15
Chika Aoki (JPN)	11	Seo Ji-yeon (KOR)	15
Karen Chang (HKG)	9	Yu Xinting (CHN)	9
Yu Xinting (CHN)	15			Seo Ji-yeon (KOR)	11
Tamara Pochekutova (KAZ)	14			Kim Ji-yeon (KOR)	15
Misaki Emura (JPN)	15	Misaki Emura (JPN)	9
Kim Ji-yeon (KOR)	15	Kim Ji-yeon (KOR)	15
Bhavani Devi (IND)	6

==== Team sabre ====
Quarterfinals
South Korea	45
Vietnam	16
Kazakhstan	31
Hong Kong	45
China	45
Chinese Taipei	21
Thailand	43
Japan	45

Semifinals
South Korea	45
Hong Kong	30
China	45
Japan	30

Final
South Korea	43
China	45
3rd place
Hong Kong	38
Japan	45
