= Fencing at the 2015 European Games – Men's foil =

Men's foil at the 2015 European Games
- Venue: Crystal Hall 3
- Date: 25 June
- Competitors: 36 from 18 nations

Medalists
gold medal	Alessio Foconi	Italy
silver medal	Timur Arslanov	Russia
bronze medal	Francesco Ingargiola	Italy
bronze medal	Jean-Paul Tony Helissey	France

The men's foil competition at the 2015 European Games in Baku was held on 25 June at the Crystal Hall 3.

== Schedule ==
All times are local (UTC+5).

Date	Time	Event
Thursday, 25 June 2015	09:00	Preliminaries
Thursday, 25 June 2015	11:10	Round of 32
Thursday, 25 June 2015	12:40	Round of 16
Thursday, 25 June 2015	13:40	Quarterfinals
Thursday, 25 June 2015	18:15	Semifinals
Thursday, 25 June 2015	19:30	Final

== Results ==
=== Preliminaries ===
==== Pool A ====
Seed	Athlete	(Hungary)	(Czech Republic)	(Ukraine)	(United Kingdom)	(Germany)	(France)	V	B	V/B	HS	HR	Diff.	RP	RT
24	András Németh (HUN)		1	3	V	3	4	1	5	0.200	16	21	–5	5	30
1	Alexander Choupenitch (CZE)	V		4	V	V	V	4	5	0.800	24	14	10	1	4
13	Klod Yunes (UKR)	V	V		V	3	4	3	5	0.600	22	20	2	3	14
25	Benjamin Peggs (GBR)	1	3	3		3	3	0	5	0.000	13	25	–12	6	35
34	Alexander Kahl (GER)	V	3	V	V		3	3	5	0.600	21	19	2	4	15
12	Jean-Paul Tony Helissey (FRA)	V	2	V	V	V		4	5	0.800	22	19	3	2	7

==== Pool B ====
Seed	Athlete	(Germany)	(United Kingdom)	(Russia)	(Poland)	(Austria)	(Israel)	V	B	V/B	HS	HR	Diff.	RP	RT
33	Niklas Uftring (GER)		V	2	V	4	0	2	5	0.400	16	20	–4	4	27
22	Alex Tofalides (GBR)	1		3	4	4	V	1	5	0.200	17	23	–6	5	31
2	Timur Safin (RUS)	V	V		V	4	2	3	5	0.600	21	15	6	3	10
26	Jakub Surwiłło (POL)	4	V	0		3	1	1	5	0.200	13	24	–11	6	33
14	René Pranz (AUT)	V	V	V	V		V	5	5	1.000	25	19	6	1	2
11	Tomer Or (ISR)	V	3	V	V	4		3	5	0.600	22	13	9	2	8

==== Pool C ====
Seed	Athlete	(Turkey)	(Italy)	(Poland)	(Russia)	(France)	(United Kingdom)	V	B	V/B	HS	HR	Diff.	RP	RT
23	Tevfik Burak Babaoğlu (TUR)		3	V	2	V	3	2	5	0.400	18	20	–2	=3	=21
32	Damiano Rosatelli (ITA)	V		4	V	4	V	3	5	0.600	23	20	3	2	13
27	Michał Janda (POL)	3	V		2	3	V	2	5	0.400	18	20	–2	=3	=21
15	Timur Arslanov (RUS)	V	3	V		V	V	4	5	0.800	23	12	11	1	3
10	Maxime Pauty (FRA)	2	V	V	1		3	2	5	0.400	16	22	-6	6	28
3	Richard Kruse (GBR)	V	4	1	2	V		2	5	0.400	17	21	–4	5	26

==== Pool D ====
Seed	Athlete	(Germany)	(Romania)	(Poland)	(Italy)	(Greece)	(United Kingdom)	V	B	V/B	HS	HR	Diff.	RP	RT
21	Georg Dörr (GER)		V	V	V	3	2	3	5	0.600	20	19	1	3	=17
28	Radu Dărăban (ROU)	4		2	4	2	2	0	5	0.000	14	25	–11	6	34
9	Leszek Rajski (POL)	1	V		V	V	V	4	5	0.800	21	14	7	1	5
4	Alessio Foconi (ITA)	4	V	2		V	V	3	5	0.600	21	16	5	2	12
36	Nikolaos Kontochristopoulos (GRE)	V	V	2	2		V4	3	5	0.600	18	18	0	4	20
16	Marcus Mepstead (GBR)	V	V	3	0	3		2	5	0.400	16	18	–2	5	24

==== Pool E ====
Seed	Athlete	(Russia)	(Belarus)	(France)	(Poland)	(Italy)	(Croatia)	V	B	V/B	HS	HR	Diff.	RP	RT
8	Dmitry Zherebchenko (RUS)		V	3	V	2	V	3	5	0.600	20	19	1	3	=17
20	Siarhei Byk (BLR)	2		3	3	V	4	1	5	0.200	17	22	–5	5	29
5	Vincent Simon (FRA)	V	V		V	1	V	4	5	0.800	21	15	6	1	6
18	Paweł Kawiecki (POL)	4	V	2		0	2	1	5	0.200	13	23	–10	6	32
30	Francesco Ingargiola (ITA)	V	2	V	V		4	3	5	0.600	21	13	8	2	9
29	Bojan Jovanović (CRO)	3	V	2	V	V		3	5	0.600	20	20	0	4	19

==== Pool F ====
Seed	Athlete	(Italy)	(Slovakia)	(Germany)	(Denmark)	(Russia)	(France)	V	B	V/B	HS	HR	Diff.	RP	RT
6	Lorenzo Nista (ITA)		V	V	4	3	V	3	5	0.600	22	17	5	2	11
35	David Végh (SVK)	1		3	3	1	2	0	5	0.000	10	25	–15	6	36
31	Mark Perelmann (GER)	4	V		V	3	V	3	5	0.600	22	21	1	3	16
19	Alexander Tsoronis (DEN)	V	V	4		3	2	2	5	0.400	19	22	–3	5	25
7	Aleksey Khovansky (RUS)	V	V	V	V		V	5	5	1.000	25	11	14	1	1
17	Baptiste Mourrain (FRA)	2	V	4	V	1		2	5	0.400	17	19	–2	4	23

=== Knockout round ===
==== Final ====
Final
12	Alessio Foconi (ITA)	15
3	Timur Arslanov (RUS)	11

==== Top half ====
Round of 32
17	Georg Dörr (GER)	15
16	Mark Perelmann (GER)	8
9	Francesco Ingargiola (ITA)	15
24	Marcus Mepstead (GBR)	14
25	Alexander Tsoronis (DEN)	15
8	Tomer Or (ISR)	12
5	Leszek Rajski (POL)	15
28	Maxime Pauty (FRA)	14
21	Michał Janda (POL)	9
12	Alessio Foconi (ITA)	15
13	Damiano Rosatelli (ITA)	15
20	Nikolaos Kontochristopoulos (GRE)	7

Round of 16
1	Aleksey Khovansky (RUS)	10
17	Georg Dörr (GER)	15
9	Francesco Ingargiola (ITA)	15
25	Alexander Tsoronis (DEN)	7
5	Leszek Rajski (POL)	14
12	Alessio Foconi (ITA)	15
13	Damiano Rosatelli (ITA)	15
4	Alexander Choupenitch (CZE)	14

Quarterfinals
17	Georg Dörr (GER)	11
9	Francesco Ingargiola (ITA)	15
12	Alessio Foconi (ITA)	15
13	Damiano Rosatelli (ITA)	12

Semifinals
9	Francesco Ingargiola (ITA)	14
12	Alessio Foconi (ITA)	15

==== Bottom half ====
Round of 32
19	Bojan Jovanović (CRO)	13
14	Klod Yunes (UKR)	15
11	Lorenzo Nista (ITA)	15
22	Tevfik Burak Babaoğlu (TUR)	8
27	Niklas Uftring (GER)	5
6	Vincent Simon (FRA)	15
7	Jean-Paul Tony Helissey (FRA)	15
26	Richard Kruse (GBR)	9
23	Baptiste Mourrain (FRA)	7
10	Timur Safin (RUS)	15
15	Alexander Kahl (GER)	11
18	Dmitry Zherebchenko (RUS)	15

Round of 16
3	Timur Arslanov (RUS)	15
14	Klod Yunes (UKR)	10
11	Lorenzo Nista (ITA)	6
6	Vincent Simon (FRA)	15
7	Jean-Paul Tony Helissey (FRA)	15
10	Timur Safin (RUS)	13
18	Dmitry Zherebchenko (RUS)	15
2	René Pranz (AUT)	8

Quarterfinals
3	Timur Arslanov (RUS)	15
6	Vincent Simon (FRA)	7
7	Jean-Paul Tony Helissey (FRA)	15
18	Dmitry Zherebchenko (RUS)	8

Semifinals
3	Timur Arslanov (RUS)	15
7	Jean-Paul Tony Helissey (FRA)	10
