= Fencing at the 2014 Asian Games – Men's individual foil =

Men's individual foil at the 2014 Asian Games
- Venue: Goyang Gymnasium
- Date: 22 September 2014
- Competitors: 22 from 12 nations

Medalists
gold medal	Ma Jianfei	China
silver medal	Heo Jun	South Korea
bronze medal	Chen Haiwei	China
bronze medal	Yuki Ota	Japan

The men's individual foil competition at the 2014 Asian Games in Goyang was held on 22 September at the Goyang Gymnasium.

== Schedule ==
All times are Korea Standard Time (UTC+09:00)

Date	Time	Event
Monday, 22 September 2014	11:00	Preliminaries
Monday, 22 September 2014	14:00	Round of 32
Monday, 22 September 2014	15:00	Round of 16
Monday, 22 September 2014	16:30	Quarterfinals
Monday, 22 September 2014	19:00	Semifinals
Monday, 22 September 2014	20:30	Gold medal match

== Results ==
=== Preliminaries ===
==== Pool A ====
Athlete	CHN	JPN	PHI	KUW	KSA	QAT
Ma Jianfei (CHN)	—	1–5	5–0	5–3	5–1	5–0
Daiki Fujino (JPN)	5–1	—	3–5	1–5	5–3	5–1
Nathaniel Perez (PHI)	0–5	5–3	—	5–3	5–2	5–3
Ali Fadhel (KUW)	3–5	5–1	3–5	—	3–5	5–0
Yahya Hazazi (KSA)	1–5	3–5	2–5	5–3	—	5–4
Khalid Meshaab (QAT)	0–5	1–5	3–5	0–5	4–5	—

==== Pool B ====
Athlete	JPN	HKG	THA	SIN	QAT	KUW
Yuki Ota (JPN)	—	4–5	5–1	5–2	5–0	5–0
Nicholas Choi (HKG)	5–4	—	5–1	4–5	5–2	5–1
Suppakorn Sritangorn (THA)	1–5	1–5	—	5–4	3–5	0–5
Joshua Lim (SIN)	2–5	5–4	4–5	—	4–5	5–1
Ali Al-Asmi (QAT)	0–5	2–5	5–3	5–4	—	5–3
Ali Khazaal (KUW)	0–5	1–5	5–0	1–5	3–5	—

==== Pool C ====
Athlete	KOR	HKG	UAE	KAZ	KSA
Heo Jun (KOR)	—	5–3	5–1	5–2	5–0
Cheung Siu Lun (HKG)	3–5	—	5–3	5–1	5–0
Majed Al-Mansoori (UAE)	1–5	3–5	—	5–3	5–3
Yuriy Bidarev (KAZ)	2–5	1–5	3–5	—	5–0
Mohammed Hazazi (KSA)	0–5	0–5	3–5	0–5	—

==== Pool D ====
Athlete	CHN	KOR	THA	SIN	PHI
Chen Haiwei (CHN)	—	5–1	5–0	5–1	5–0
Son Young-ki (KOR)	1–5	—	5–2	5–0	2–5
Nontapat Panchan (THA)	0–5	2–5	—	5–2	5–4
Zhang Zhenggang (SIN)	1–5	0–5	2–5	—	5–3
Wilfred Curioso (PHI)	0–5	5–2	4–5	3–5	—

==== Summary ====
Rank	Pool	Athlete	W	L	W/M	TD	TF
1	D	Chen Haiwei (CHN)	4	0	1.000	+18	20
2	C	Heo Jun (KOR)	4	0	1.000	+14	20
3	B	Yuki Ota (JPN)	4	1	0.800	+16	24
4	A	Ma Jianfei (CHN)	4	1	0.800	+12	21
5	B	Nicholas Choi (HKG)	4	1	0.800	+11	24
6	A	Nathaniel Perez (PHI)	4	1	0.800	+4	20
7	C	Cheung Siu Lun (HKG)	3	1	0.750	+9	18
8	A	Daiki Fujino (JPN)	3	2	0.600	+4	19
9	B	Ali Al-Asmi (QAT)	3	2	0.600	−3	17
10	D	Son Young-ki (KOR)	2	2	0.500	+1	13
11	C	Majed Al-Mansoori (UAE)	2	2	0.500	−2	14
12	D	Nontapat Panchan (THA)	2	2	0.500	−4	12
13	A	Ali Fadhel (KUW)	2	3	0.400	+3	19
14	B	Joshua Lim (SIN)	2	3	0.400	0	20
15	A	Yahya Hazazi (KSA)	2	3	0.400	−6	16
16	C	Yuriy Bidarev (KAZ)	1	3	0.250	−4	11
17	D	Wilfred Curioso (PHI)	1	3	0.250	−5	12
18	D	Zhang Zhenggang (SIN)	1	3	0.250	−10	8
19	B	Ali Khazaal (KUW)	1	4	0.200	−10	10
20	B	Suppakorn Sritangorn (THA)	1	4	0.200	−14	10
21	A	Khalid Meshaab (QAT)	0	5	0.000	−17	8
22	C	Mohammed Hazazi (KSA)	0	4	0.000	−17	3

=== Knockout round ===
==== Final ====
Gold medal match
4	Ma Jianfei (CHN)	15
2	Heo Jun (KOR)	13

==== Top half ====
Round of 32
17	Wilfred Curioso (PHI)	15
16	Yuriy Bidarev (KAZ)	14

Round of 16
1	Chen Haiwei (CHN)	15
17	Wilfred Curioso (PHI)	5
9	Ali Al-Asmi (QAT)	2
8	Daiki Fujino (JPN)	15
5	Nicholas Choi (HKG)	15
12	Nontapat Panchan (THA)	5
13	Ali Fadhel (KUW)	9
4	Ma Jianfei (CHN)	15

Quarterfinals
1	Chen Haiwei (CHN)	15
8	Daiki Fujino (JPN)	4
5	Nicholas Choi (HKG)	9
4	Ma Jianfei (CHN)	15

Semifinals
1	Chen Haiwei (CHN)	8
4	Ma Jianfei (CHN)	15

==== Bottom half ====
Round of 32

Round of 16
3	Yuki Ota (JPN)	15
14	Joshua Lim (SIN)	8
11	Majed Al-Mansoori (UAE)	15
6	Nathaniel Perez (PHI)	11
7	Cheung Siu Lun (HKG)	8
10	Son Young-ki (KOR)	15
15	Yahya Hazazi (KSA)	5
2	Heo Jun (KOR)	15

Quarterfinals
3	Yuki Ota (JPN)	15
11	Majed Al-Mansoori (UAE)	3
10	Son Young-ki (KOR)	11
2	Heo Jun (KOR)	15

Semifinals
3	Yuki Ota (JPN)	14
2	Heo Jun (KOR)	15

== Final standing ==
Rank	Athlete
1st place, gold medalist(s)	Ma Jianfei (CHN)
2nd place, silver medalist(s)	Heo Jun (KOR)
3rd place, bronze medalist(s)	Chen Haiwei (CHN)
3rd place, bronze medalist(s)	Yuki Ota (JPN)
5	Nicholas Choi (HKG)
6	Daiki Fujino (JPN)
7	Son Young-ki (KOR)
8	Majed Al-Mansoori (UAE)
9	Nathaniel Perez (PHI)
10	Cheung Siu Lun (HKG)
11	Ali Al-Asmi (QAT)
12	Nontapat Panchan (THA)
13	Ali Fadhel (KUW)
14	Joshua Lim (SIN)
15	Yahya Hazazi (KSA)
16	Wilfred Curioso (PHI)
17	Yuriy Bidarev (KAZ)
18	Zhang Zhenggang (SIN)
19	Ali Khazaal (KUW)
20	Suppakorn Sritangorn (THA)
21	Khalid Meshaab (QAT)
22	Mohammed Hazazi (KSA)
