= 2018 Asian Fencing Championships =

- Host city: Bangkok, Thailand
- Dates: 17–22 June 2018
- Main venue: Rangsit Campus

The 2018 Asian Fencing Championships were held in Bangkok, Thailand from 17 to 22 June 2018 at the Rangsit Campus.

== Medal summary ==
=== Men ===
Event	Gold	Silver	Bronze
Individual épée	Jung Jin-sun; South Korea	Dmitriy Alexanin; Kazakhstan	Fong Hoi Sun; Hong Kong
Individual épée	Jung Jin-sun; South Korea	Dmitriy Alexanin; Kazakhstan	Koki Kano; Japan
Team épée	China; Dong Chao; Lan Minghao; Shi Gaofeng; Xue Yangdong	Kazakhstan; Dmitriy Alexanin; Elmir Alimzhanov; Ruslan Kurbanov; Vadim Sharlaimov	Uzbekistan; Roman Aleksandrov; Fayzulla Alimov; Javokhirbek Nurmatov; Oleg Sokolov
Team épée	China; Dong Chao; Lan Minghao; Shi Gaofeng; Xue Yangdong	Kazakhstan; Dmitriy Alexanin; Elmir Alimzhanov; Ruslan Kurbanov; Vadim Sharlaimov	South Korea; Jung Jin-sun; Kweon Young-jun; Park Kyoung-doo; Park Sang-young
Individual foil	Cheung Siu Lun; Hong Kong	Heo Jun; South Korea	Huang Mengkai; China
Individual foil	Cheung Siu Lun; Hong Kong	Heo Jun; South Korea	Ha Tae-gyu; South Korea
Team foil	South Korea; Ha Tae-gyu; Heo Jun; Lee Kwang-hyun; Son Young-ki	Hong Kong; Cheung Ka Long; Cheung Siu Lun; Ryan Choi; Nicholas Choi	Japan; Kyosuke Matsuyama; Toshiya Saito; Takahiro Shikine; Kenta Suzumura
Team foil	South Korea; Ha Tae-gyu; Heo Jun; Lee Kwang-hyun; Son Young-ki	Hong Kong; Cheung Ka Long; Cheung Siu Lun; Ryan Choi; Nicholas Choi	Australia; Sholto Douglas; Ned Fitzgerald; Chris Nagle; Lucas Webber
Individual sabre	Gu Bon-gil; South Korea	Kim Jung-hwan; South Korea	Ali Pakdaman; Iran
Individual sabre	Gu Bon-gil; South Korea	Kim Jung-hwan; South Korea	Kim Jun-ho; South Korea
Team sabre	China; Lu Yang; Wang Shi; Xu Yingming; Yan Yinghui	Iran; Mojtaba Abedini; Mohammad Fotouhi; Ali Pakdaman; Mohammad Rahbari	South Korea; Gu Bon-gil; Kim Jun-ho; Kim Jung-hwan; Oh Sang-uk
Team sabre	China; Lu Yang; Wang Shi; Xu Yingming; Yan Yinghui	Iran; Mojtaba Abedini; Mohammad Fotouhi; Ali Pakdaman; Mohammad Rahbari	Japan; Tomohiro Shimamura; Kaito Streets; Kenta Tokunan; Kento Yoshida

=== Women ===
Event	Gold	Silver	Bronze
Individual épée	Vivian Kong; Hong Kong	Kang Young-mi; South Korea	Lee Hye-in; South Korea
Individual épée	Vivian Kong; Hong Kong	Kang Young-mi; South Korea	Kaylin Hsieh; Hong Kong
Team épée	China; Hou Guangjuan; Lin Sheng; Sun Yiwen; Zhu Mingye	Hong Kong; Chu Ka Mong; Kaylin Hsieh; Vivian Kong; Coco Lin	South Korea; Choi In-jeong; Kang Young-mi; Lee Hye-in; Shin A-lam
Team épée	China; Hou Guangjuan; Lin Sheng; Sun Yiwen; Zhu Mingye	Hong Kong; Chu Ka Mong; Kaylin Hsieh; Vivian Kong; Coco Lin	Japan; Shiori Komata; Ayaka Shimookawa; Ayumi Yamada; Miho Yoshimura
Individual foil	Komaki Kikuchi; Japan	Jeon Hee-sook; South Korea	Nam Hyun-hee; South Korea
Individual foil	Komaki Kikuchi; Japan	Jeon Hee-sook; South Korea	Fu Yiting; China
Team foil	South Korea; Hong Hyo-jin; Hong Seo-in; Jeon Hee-sook; Nam Hyun-hee	Japan; Sera Azuma; Komaki Kikuchi; Karin Miyawaki; Shiho Nishioka	China; Chen Qingyuan; Fu Yiting; Huo Xingxin; Shi Yue
Team foil	South Korea; Hong Hyo-jin; Hong Seo-in; Jeon Hee-sook; Nam Hyun-hee	Japan; Sera Azuma; Komaki Kikuchi; Karin Miyawaki; Shiho Nishioka	Hong Kong; Cheng Hiu Lam; Kimberley Cheung; Lin Po Heung; Liu Yan Wai
Individual sabre	Kim Ji-yeon; South Korea	Qian Jiarui; China	Lam Hin Wai; Hong Kong
Individual sabre	Kim Ji-yeon; South Korea	Qian Jiarui; China	Choi Soo-yeon; South Korea
Team sabre	China; Jia Xiaoye; Qian Jiarui; Shao Yaqi; Yang Hengyu	South Korea; Choi Soo-yeon; Hwang Seon-a; Kim Ji-yeon	Kazakhstan; Aibike Khabibullina; Tamara Pochekutova; Tatyana Prikhodko; Aigerim Sarybay
Team sabre	China; Jia Xiaoye; Qian Jiarui; Shao Yaqi; Yang Hengyu	South Korea; Choi Soo-yeon; Hwang Seon-a; Kim Ji-yeon	Hong Kong; Au Sin Ying; Chan Yin Fei; Karen Chang; Lam Hin Wai

== Medal table ==
Rank	Nation	Gold	Silver	Bronze	Total
1	South Korea	5	5	8	18
2	China	4	1	3	8
3	Hong Kong	2	2	5	9
4	Japan	1	1	4	6
5	Kazakhstan	0	2	1	3
6	Iran	0	1	1	2
7	Australia	0	0	1	1
7	Uzbekistan	0	0	1	1
Totals (8 entries)		12	12	24	48

== Results ==
=== Men ===
==== Individual épée ====
Quarterfinals		Semifinals		Final
Jung Jin-sun (KOR)	15
Ng Ho Tin (HKG)	11	Jung Jin-sun (KOR)	15
Kweon Young-jun (KOR)	10	Fong Hoi Sun (HKG)	11
Fong Hoi Sun (HKG)	15			Jung Jin-sun (KOR)	15
Satoru Uyama (JPN)	4			Dmitriy Alexanin (KAZ)	12
Dmitriy Alexanin (KAZ)	15	Dmitriy Alexanin (KAZ)	12
Koki Kano (JPN)	15	Koki Kano (JPN)	6
Oleg Sokolov (UZB)	14

==== Team épée ====
Quarterfinals
South Korea	45
Chinese Taipei	35
Hong Kong	41
Kazakhstan	45
China	45
Iran	27
Uzbekistan	45
Japan	31

Semifinals
South Korea	39
Kazakhstan	45
China	45
Uzbekistan	40

Final
Kazakhstan	44
China	45
3rd place
South Korea	43
Uzbekistan	45

==== Individual foil ====
Quarterfinals		Semifinals		Final
Heo Jun (KOR)	15
Son Young-ki (KOR)	11	Heo Jun (KOR)	15
Cheung Ka Long (HKG)	12	Huang Mengkai (CHN)	10
Huang Mengkai (CHN)	15			Heo Jun (KOR)	7
Toshiya Saito (JPN)	12			Cheung Siu Lun (HKG)	15
Ha Tae-gyu (KOR)	15	Ha Tae-gyu (KOR)	9
Nicholas Choi (HKG)	11	Cheung Siu Lun (HKG)	15
Cheung Siu Lun (HKG)	12

==== Team foil ====
Quarterfinals
South Korea	45
Thailand	20
Singapore	33
Australia	45
China	37
Hong Kong	45
Chinese Taipei	25
Japan	45

Semifinals
South Korea	45
Australia	36
Hong Kong	45
Japan	40

Final
South Korea	45
Hong Kong	39
3rd place
Australia	31
Japan	45

==== Individual sabre ====
Quarterfinals		Semifinals		Final
Ali Pakdaman (IRI)	15
Kenta Tokunan (JPN)	6	Ali Pakdaman (IRI)	13
Gu Bon-gil (KOR)	15	Gu Bon-gil (KOR)	15
Wang Shi (CHN)	7			Gu Bon-gil (KOR)	15
Kim Jun-ho (KOR)	15			Kim Jung-hwan (KOR)	12
Aaron Ho (HKG)	6	Kim Jun-ho (KOR)	12
Kim Jung-hwan (KOR)	15	Kim Jung-hwan (KOR)	15
Tomohiro Shimamura (JPN)	11

==== Team sabre ====
Quarterfinals
South Korea	45
Vietnam	25
Hong Kong	29
China	45
Japan	45
Kazakhstan	33
Singapore	21
Iran	45

Semifinals
South Korea	43
China	45
Japan	26
Iran	45

Final
China	45
Iran	41
3rd place
South Korea	45
Japan	31

=== Women ===
==== Individual épée ====
Quarterfinals		Semifinals		Final
Vivian Kong (HKG)	13
Zhu Mingye (CHN)	5	Vivian Kong (HKG)	15
Shin A-lam (KOR)	13	Lee Hye-in (KOR)	14
Lee Hye-in (KOR)	15			Vivian Kong (HKG)	10
Kaylin Hsieh (HKG)	15			Kang Young-mi (KOR)	9
Coco Lin (HKG)	6	Kaylin Hsieh (HKG)	12
Ayaka Shimookawa (JPN)	10	Kang Young-mi (KOR)	14
Kang Young-mi (KOR)	15

==== Team épée ====
Quarterfinals
China	45
Iran	25
Singapore	33
Japan	45
Hong Kong	45
Kazakhstan	29
India	28
South Korea	45

Semifinals
China	45
Japan	15
Hong Kong	45
South Korea	40

Final
China	35
Hong Kong	34
3rd place
Japan	33
South Korea	45

==== Individual foil ====
Quarterfinals		Semifinals		Final
Komaki Kikuchi (JPN)	15
Shi Yue (CHN)	12	Komaki Kikuchi (JPN)	15
Karin Miyawaki (JPN)	4	Nam Hyun-hee (KOR)	14
Nam Hyun-hee (KOR)	15			Komaki Kikuchi (JPN)	15
Hong Hyo-jin (KOR)	9			Jeon Hee-sook (KOR)	10
Fu Yiting (CHN)	15	Fu Yiting (CHN)	6
Chen Qingyuan (CHN)	10	Jeon Hee-sook (KOR)	7
Jeon Hee-sook (KOR)	15

==== Team foil ====
Quarterfinals
South Korea	45
Vietnam	16
Chinese Taipei	14
Hong Kong	45
China	45
Singapore	27
Philippines	38
Japan	45

Semifinals
South Korea	45
Hong Kong	18
China	42
Japan	43

Final
South Korea	45
Japan	44
3rd place
Hong Kong	20
China	41

==== Individual sabre ====
Quarterfinals		Semifinals		Final
Shihomi Fukushima (JPN)	10
Qian Jiarui (CHN)	15	Qian Jiarui (CHN)	15
Yang Hengyu (CHN)	13	Lam Hin Wai (HKG)	8
Lam Hin Wai (HKG)	15			Qian Jiarui (CHN)	5
Choi Soo-yeon (KOR)	15			Kim Ji-yeon (KOR)	15
Najmeh Sazanjian (IRI)	7	Choi Soo-yeon (KOR)	13
Norika Tamura (JPN)	14	Kim Ji-yeon (KOR)	15
Kim Ji-yeon (KOR)	15

==== Team sabre ====
Quarterfinals
South Korea	45
Iran	18
Chinese Taipei	29
Hong Kong	45
Japan	43
Kazakhstan	45
Singapore	24
China	45

Semifinals
South Korea	45
Hong Kong	30
Kazakhstan	28
China	45

Final
South Korea	42
China	45
3rd place
Hong Kong	42
Kazakhstan	45
