= Fencing at the 2018 Asian Games – Men's team foil =

Men's team foil at the 2018 Asian Games
- Venue: Jakarta Convention Center
- Date: 24 August 2018
- Competitors: 38 from 10 nations

Medalists
gold medal	South Korea; Ha Tae-gyu, Heo Jun, Lee Kwang-hyun, Son Young-ki
silver medal	Hong Kong; Cheung Ka Long, Nicholas Choi, Ryan Choi, Yeung Chi Ka
bronze medal	Japan; Kyosuke Matsuyama, Toshiya Saito, Takahiro Shikine, Kenta Suzumura
bronze medal	China; Huang Mengkai, Li Chen, Ma Jianfei, Shi Jialuo

The men's team foil competition at the 2018 Asian Games in Jakarta was held on 24 August at the Jakarta Convention Center. China leads with five gold medals in this event, while South Korea and Japan were in the second and third position with 3 and 2 gold medals respectively. The other countries that ever won medals in this event were Hong Kong with 4 bronzes and Iran with a bronze.

South Korean team emerged as the champion in the men's team foil event for the third times after the victorious in 1986 Seoul and 1994 Hiroshima. The team defeated the top seeded Hong Kong with the score 45–37 in the final. Hong Kong team settled for the silver medal, while China and Japan teams who were beaten in the semifinals clinched the bronze medal.

== Schedule ==
All times are Western Indonesia Time (UTC+07:00)

Date	Time	Event
Friday, 24 August 2018	10:00	Round of 16
Friday, 24 August 2018	12:00	Quarterfinals
Friday, 24 August 2018	14:30	Semifinals
Friday, 24 August 2018	19:00	Gold medal match

== Seeding ==
The teams were seeded taking into account the results achieved by competitors representing each team in the individual event.

Rank	Team	Fencer		Total
Rank	Team	1	2	Total
1	Hong Kong (HKG)	2	3	5
2	South Korea (KOR)	3	7	10
3	China (CHN)	1	10	11
4	Japan (JPN)	5	9	14
5	Singapore (SGP)	8	13	21
6	Chinese Taipei (TPE)	6	16	22
7	Philippines (PHI)	14	17	31
8	Indonesia (INA)	15	20	35
9	Thailand (THA)	23	26	49
10	Nepal (NEP)	28	29	57

== Results ==
Round of 16
9	Thailand	40
8	Indonesia	45
7	Philippines	45
10	Nepal	3

Quarterfinals
1	Hong Kong	45
8	Indonesia	11
5	Singapore	29
4	Japan	45
3	China	45
6	Chinese Taipei	31
7	Philippines	19
2	South Korea	45

Semifinals
1	Hong Kong	45
4	Japan	42
3	China	43
2	South Korea	45

Gold medal match
1	Hong Kong	37
2	South Korea	45

== Final standing ==
Rank	Team
1st place, gold medalist(s)	South Korea (KOR); Ha Tae-gyu; Heo Jun; Lee Kwang-hyun; Son Young-ki
2nd place, silver medalist(s)	Hong Kong (HKG); Cheung Ka Long; Nicholas Choi; Ryan Choi; Yeung Chi Ka
3rd place, bronze medalist(s)	Japan (JPN); Kyosuke Matsuyama; Toshiya Saito; Takahiro Shikine; Kenta Suzumura
3rd place, bronze medalist(s)	China (CHN); Huang Mengkai; Li Chen; Ma Jianfei; Shi Jialuo
5	Singapore (SGP); Kevin Jerrold Chan; Joshua Lim; Darren Tan; Zhang Zhenggang
6	Chinese Taipei (TPE); Chen Chih-chieh; Chen Yi-tung; Ou Feng-ming; Wang Chun-jui
7	Philippines (PHI); Brennan Louie; Michael Nicanor; Nathaniel Perez
8	Indonesia (INA); Muhammad Fatah Prasetyo; Dennis Ariadinata Satriana; Ihsan Ariesda Solihin; Mohammad Zulfikar
9	Thailand (THA); Ratchanavi Deejing; Sitsadipat Doungpatra; Chornnasun Mayakarn
10	Nepal (NEP); Sher Singh Airy; Mahesh Prasad Bhatt; Rajan Raj Khadka; Sanjeep Lama
