= Shi Yue (fencer) =

Chinese fencer (born 1999)

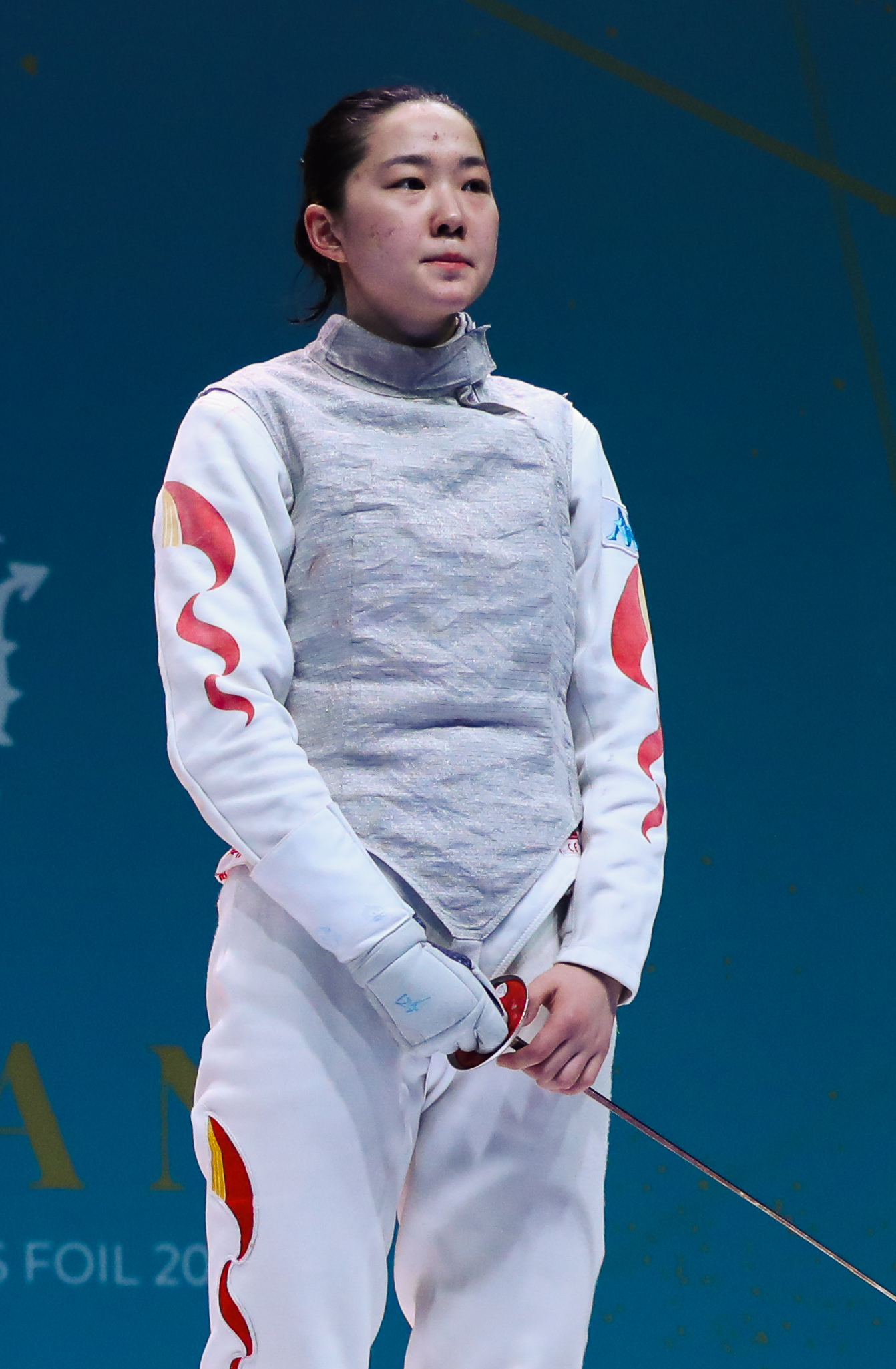

Personal information
- Born: 17 April 1999 (age 27)

Fencing career
- Sport: Fencing
- Country: China
- Hand: Right-handed
Medal record
Women's foil fencing
Representing China
Asian Games
Silver medal – second place	2018 Jakarta	Team
Asian Fencing Championships
Gold medal – first place	2022 Seoul	Individual
Silver medal – second place	2022 Seoul	Team
Bronze medal – third place	2018 Bangkok	Team
Bronze medal – third place	2019 Chiba	Team

Shi Yue (Chinese: 石玥, born 17 April 1999) is a Chinese fencer. She won the gold medal in the women's individual foil event at the 2022 Asian Fencing Championships held in Seoul, South Korea.

She competed in the women's foil event at the World Fencing Championships in 2018 and 2019 and in both competitions she was eliminated in her first match.

In 2018, she won the silver medal in the women's team foil event at the Asian Games held in Jakarta, Indonesia. She won one of the bronze medals in the women's team foil event at the 2019 Asian Fencing Championships held in Chiba, Japan.
