= Vivian Kong =

Hong Kong fencer and politician (born 1994)

The Honourable Vivian Kong Man-wai SBS MH
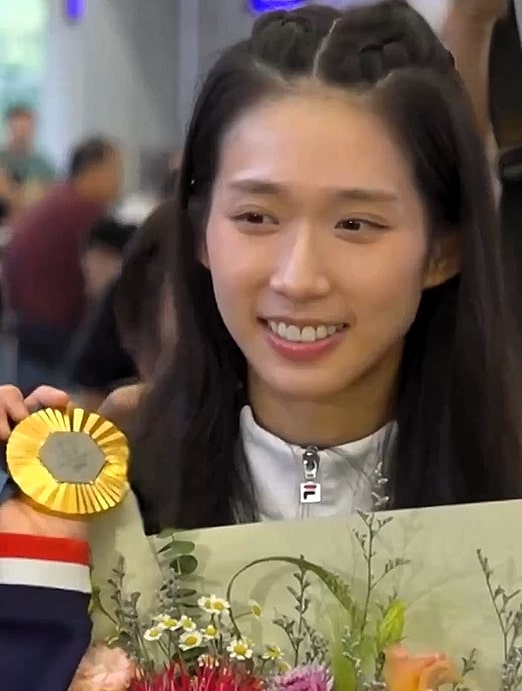
- Kong in 2024 with her Olympic gold medal

Member of the Legislative Council
- Incumbent
- Assumed office 1 January 2026
- Preceded by: Yiu Pak-leung
- Constituency: Tourism

Personal details
- Born: 8 February 1994 (age 32) Hong Kong
- Citizenship: China (Hong Kong); Canada (until 2026)
- Sports career
- Nickname: Smiling Queen of Fencing (微笑劍后)
- Weight: 66 kg (146 lb)
- Sport: Fencing
- Event: Épée
- Turned pro: 2013
- Coached by: Octavian Zidaru
Medal record
Women's épée
Representing Hong Kong
Olympic Games
Gold medal – first place	2024 Paris	Individual
World Championships
Bronze medal – third place	2019 Budapest	Individual
Bronze medal – third place	2022 Cairo	Individual
Asian Games
Silver medal – second place	2022 Hangzhou	Team
Bronze medal – third place	2014 Incheon	Individual
Bronze medal – third place	2014 Incheon	Team
Bronze medal – third place	2018 Jakarta	Individual
Bronze medal – third place	2018 Jakarta	Team
Bronze medal – third place	2022 Hangzhou	Individual
Asian Championships
Gold medal – first place	2018 Bangkok	Individual
Gold medal – first place	2022 Seoul	Individual
Gold medal – first place	2023 Wuxi	Individual
Silver medal – second place	2017 Hong Kong	Individual
Silver medal – second place	2018 Bangkok	Team
Silver medal – second place	2022 Seoul	Team
Silver medal – second place	2023 Wuxi	Team
Bronze medal – third place	2011 Seoul	Team
Bronze medal – third place	2014 Suwon	Team
Bronze medal – third place	2015 Singapore	Team
Bronze medal – third place	2016 Wuxi	Team
Bronze medal – third place	2017 Hong Kong	Team
Bronze medal – third place	2019 Chiba	Team

Kong Man Wai
- Chinese: 江旻憓
- Cantonese Yale: gōng màhn waih
Transcriptions
Standard Mandarin
- Hanyu Pinyin: Jiāng Mínhuì
Yue: Cantonese
- Yale Romanization: gōng màhn waih
- Jyutping: gong1 man4 wai6

Vivian Kong Man Wai SBS MH (Chinese: 江旻憓; Jyutping: gong1 man4 wai6; born 8 February 1994) is a Hong Kong politician and former épée fencer. A three-time individual Asian champion and three-time Olympian, she won gold in women's individual épée at the 2024 Paris Olympic Games.

After retiring from fencing, Kong has become a member of the Legislative Council of Hong Kong, representing the Tourism constituency since 2026.

== Early life ==
Kong was born in Hong Kong during British colonial rule, but lived in Canada between the ages of two and six. Before taking up fencing, she variously forayed into ballet and taekwondo. She started fencing at the age of eleven and chose épée, stating it "combined the speed of taekwondo and the grace of ballet".

== Education ==
Kong completed her secondary studies at Sha Tin College and graduated from Stanford University with a Bachelor of Arts in international relations. In 2021 she obtained her master of law degree at the Renmin University of China. As of 2024, she is studying for a Juris Doctor degree at the Faculty of Law at The Chinese University of Hong Kong and aspires to work for the United Nations. Kong has taken a sabbatical to prepare for the Olympics and had previously declined an offer to represent Canada.

== Career ==
=== Fencing ===
Kong competed in the 2016 Rio de Janeiro Olympic Games and the 2020 Tokyo Olympic Games. She became the first fencer from Hong Kong to win a World Cup title when she won the FIE Women's Épée World Cup in Havana, Cuba in January 2019.

Kong won one of the bronze medals in the Women's épée at the 2022 World Fencing Championships held in Cairo, Egypt.

In the women's épée event at the 2024 Paris Olympic Games, Kong defeated Olena Kryvytska in the quarterfinals and Nelli Differt in the semifinals. In the finals, she overcame a 1–7 deficit against Auriane Mallo to win 13–12, securing Hong Kong's third-ever Olympic gold medal. She was the first Hong Kong athlete to win a gold medal at the 2024 Olympics.

On 4 August 2024, Kong announced on Instagram that she would retire from professional fencing and stated that she looks forward to pursuing a "new career". On 6 August, a Facebook post by Raymond Tam announced that Kong would join the Hong Kong Jockey Club to promote sports development.

=== Politics ===
On 3 November 2025, Kong filed her candidacy for the Legislative Council for the Tourism Functional Constituency seat in the 2025 elections, one of 12 functional constituencies in the legislature that allow people with the right of abode in a foreign country to take office. She also announced she had applied to renounce her Canadian passport.

She won the Legislative Council election through Tourism functional constituency with 131 votes in December 2025.

== Medal record ==
=== Olympic Games ===
Year	Location	Event	Position
2024	Paris, France	Individual Women's Épée	1st

=== World Championship ===
Year	Location	Event	Position
2019	Budapest, Hungary	Individual Women's Épée	3rd
2022	Cairo, Egypt	Individual Women's Épée	3rd

=== Grand Prix ===
Date	Location	Event	Position
2017-05-26	Bogotá, Colombia	Individual Women's Épée	2nd
2023-01-29	Doha, Qatar	Individual Women's Épée	3rd
2023-05-07	Cali, Colombia	Individual Women's Épée	1st
2024-01-31	Doha, Qatar	Individual Women's Épée	1st

=== World Cup ===
Date	Location	Event	Position
2014-07-02	Leipzig, Germany	Individual Women's Épée	3rd
2016-05-20	Legnano, Italy	Individual Women's Épée	3rd
2018-01-19	Havana, Cuba	Individual Women's Épée	3rd
2018-09-11	Tallinn, Estonia	Individual Women's Épée	2nd
2019-11-01	Havana, Cuba	Individual Women's Épée	1st
2019-08-02	Barcelona, Spain	Individual Women's Épée	1st
2019-05-17	Dubai, United Arab Emirates	Individual Women's Épée	3rd
2022-12-10	Vancouver, Canada	Individual Women's Épée	2nd
2023-05-19	Fujairah, United Arab Emirates	Individual Women's Épée	2nd
2024-02-10	Barcelona, Spain	Individual Women's Épée	1st
2024-05-18	Fujairah, United Arab Emirates	Individual Women's Épée	1st

=== Asian Championship ===
Year	Location	Event	Position
2011	Seoul, South Korea	Team Women's Épée	3rd
2014	Suwon, South Korea	Team Women's Épée	3rd
2015	Kallang, Singapore	Team Women's Épée	3rd
2016	Wuxi, China	Team Women's Épée	3rd
2017	Hong Kong, China	Individual Women's Épée	2nd
2017	Hong Kong, China	Team Women's Épée	3rd
2018	Bangkok, Thailand	Individual Women's Épée	1st
2018	Bangkok, Thailand	Team Women's Épée	2nd
2019	Chiba, Japan	Team Women's Épée	3rd
2022	Seoul, South Korea	Individual Women's Épée	1st
2022	Seoul, South Korea	Team Women's Épée	2nd
2023	Wuxi, China	Individual Women's Épée	1st
2023	Wuxi, China	Team Women's Épée	2nd

== Electoral history ==
Electoral history of Vivian Kong
Year	Body	Constituency	Party	Votes received				Result
Year	Body	Constituency	Party	Total	%	P.	Swing	Result
2025	Legislative Council	Tourism	Independent	131	85.06%	1st	—N/a	Won

Political offices
Legislative Council of Hong Kong
Preceded by Yiu Pak-leung	Member of Legislative Council; Representative for Tourism; 2026–present	Incumbent
