= Carlos Llavador =

Spanish foil fencer (born 1992)

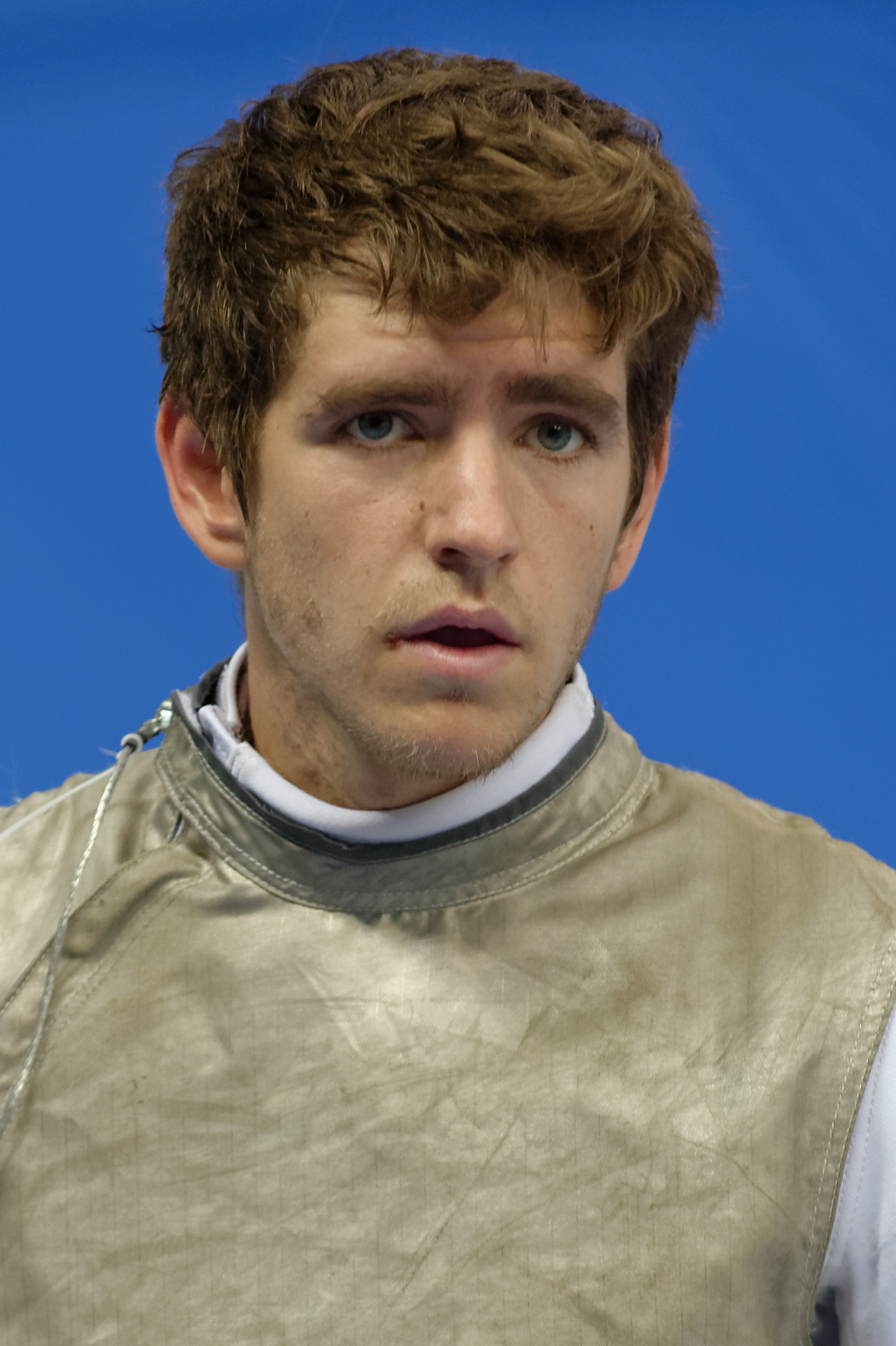

Personal information
- Nationality: Spanish
- Born: 26 April 1992 (age 34) Madrid, Spain

Fencing career
- Sport: Fencing
- Weapon: Foil
- Hand: left-handed
- Club: Sala de Armas de Madrid
- FIE ranking: current ranking
Medal record
Men's fencing
Representing Spain
World Championships
Bronze medal – third place	2018 Wuxi	Individual
European Championships
Bronze medal – third place	2015 Montreux	Individual
Bronze medal – third place	2025 Genoa	Individual
Mediterranean Games
Silver medal – second place	2022 Oran	Individual

Carlos Llavador Fernández (born 26 April 1992) is a Spanish foil fencer. He won the silver medal in the men's individual foil event at the 2022 Mediterranean Games held in Oran, Algeria.

== Career ==
His first major result was a bronze medal at the U23 European Championships in Vincenza in April 2015. He was the only Spanish foilist to take part in the 2015 European Championships in Montreux. No.136 in senior rankings, he created a surprise by reaching the semifinals after prevailing over Britain's Richard Kruse. He then lost to Andrea Cassarà and came away with a bronze medal. A resident of Sala de Armas de Madrid, he will train in the 2015–16 season with Frascati Scherma along with Montreux silver medallist Daniele Garozzo.
