= Huo Xingxin =

Chinese fencer (born 1996)

Personal information
- Born: 19 January 1996 (age 30)

Fencing career
- Sport: Fencing
- Country: China
- Hand: Left-handed
Medal record
Women's foil fencing
Representing China
Asian Games
| Silver medal – second place | 2018 Jakarta | Team |
Asian Fencing Championships
| Gold medal – first place | 2017 Hong Kong | Individual |
| Bronze medal – third place | 2017 Hong Kong | Team |
| Bronze medal – third place | 2018 Bangkok | Team |
| Bronze medal – third place | 2019 Chiba | Team |

Huo Xingxin (simplified Chinese: 霍兴欣; traditional Chinese: 霍興欣; pinyin: Huò Xīngxīn; born 19 January 1996) is a Chinese fencer. She competed in the women's foil event at the World Fencing Championships in 2015, 2017, 2018 and 2019.

In 2017, she won the gold medal in her event at the Asian Fencing Championships held in Hong Kong.

In 2018, she won the silver medal in the women's team foil event at the Asian Games held in Jakarta, Indonesia. She also won one of the bronze medals in the women's team foil event at the 2019 Asian Fencing Championships held in Chiba, Japan.

== Career ==
On June 15, 2017, the 2017 Asian Fencing Championships officially opened at the Asia International Expo Center in Hong Kong. Huo Xingxin won the women's foil final, defeating South Korean star Nam Hyun-hee 15–6. On September 1, 2017, the fencing competition of the 13th National Games concluded on the fourth day of competition at the Tianjin Institute of Physical Education Gymnasium. In the women's foil team competition, the Jiangsu team composed of Huo Xingxin, Shi Yun, Lu Yazhu and others won the third place. In November 2017, the Chinese women's foil team composed of Fu Yiting, Huo Xingxin, Shi Yue and Chen Qingyuan won the bronze medal at the Women's Foil World Cup Saint-Maur in France. This is the first time a Chinese women's foil team has won the World Cup since 2010. The best result on the field.

On May 20, 2018, the 2018 "Westgate Square" FIE Foil World Cup Grand Prix concluded in Shanghai. Huo Xingxin, the athlete with the highest individual points ranking of the Chinese team in women's foil, appeared on the field and finally ranked 12th. On August 6, 2018, the list of athletes for the Chinese delegation at the Jakarta Asian Games was announced, and Huo Xingxin was included. On August 23, the fencing competition of the 2018 Jakarta Asian Games started in the women's foil team competition. The Chinese team's players were Fu Yiting, Huo Xingxin and Chen Qingyuan. They eventually lost to the Japanese team 34–35. Following the last Asian Games After the meeting, he won the silver medal again.

On July 19, 2019, the 2019 World Fencing Championships continued. Huo Xingxin broke into eighth place in the women's foil event, setting a personal best result.

== Awards and honours ==
In February 2017, he was awarded the title of Sportsman by the State Sports General Administration.

In 2017, she won the women's foil final of the Asian Fencing Championships.

In 2017, she won the third place in the women's foil team in the fencing competition of the 13th National Games.

In 2018, she won the silver medal in the women's foil team event at the Jakarta Asian Games.

In 2019, she ranked eighth in the women's foil event at the World Fencing Championships.
