= Ha Tae-gyu =

South Korean fencer (born 1989)

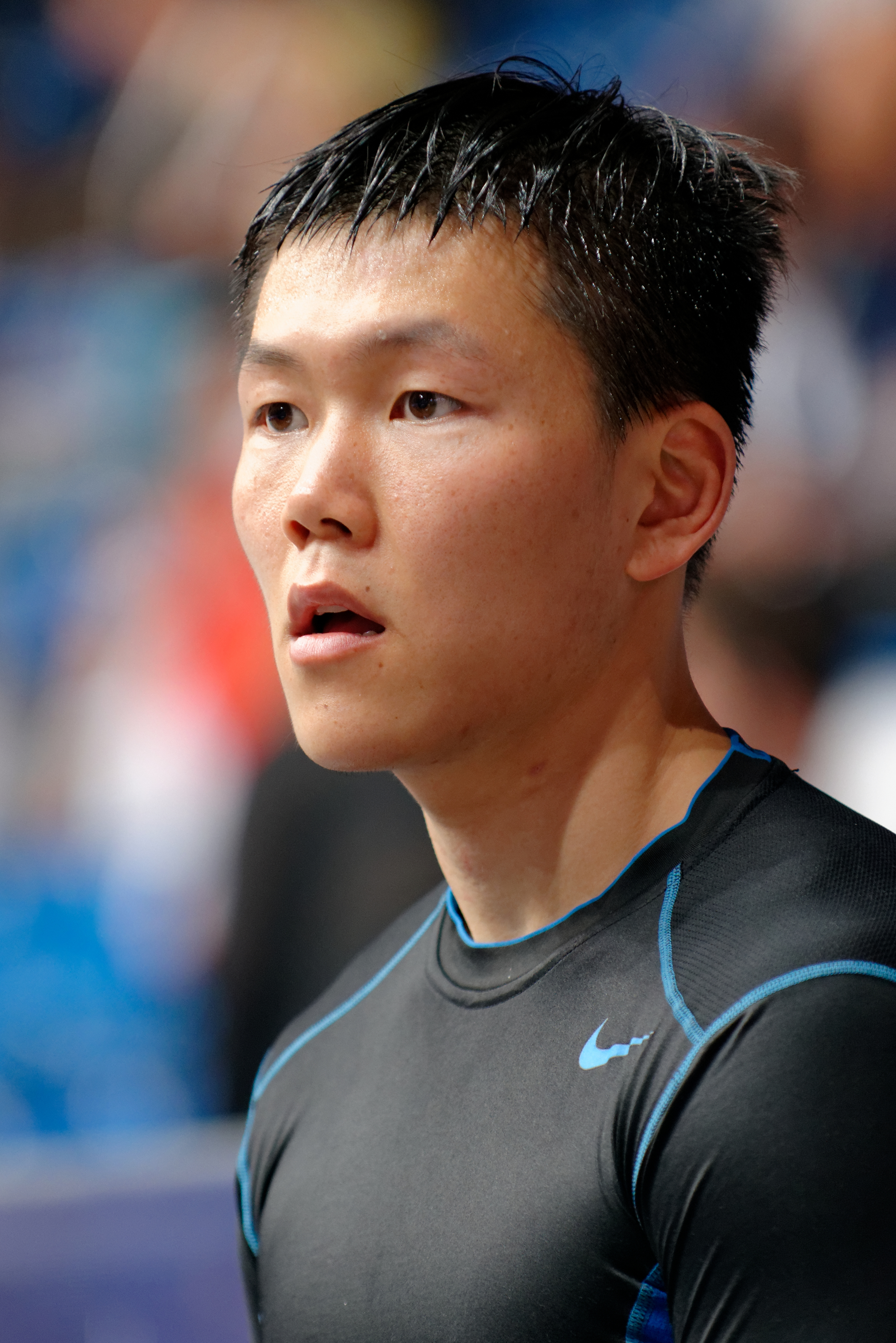
- Ha Tae-gyu in 2013

Personal information
- Born: 20 December 1989 (age 36)

Fencing career
- Sport: Fencing
- Country: South Korea
- Weapon: foil
- Hand: Left-handed
Medal record
Men's foil fencing
Representing South Korea
Asian Games
Gold medal – first place	2022 Hangzhou	Team
Gold medal – first place	2018 Jakarta	Team
Bronze medal – third place	2010 Guangzhou	Team
Asian Fencing Championships
Gold medal – first place	2012 Wakayama	Team
Gold medal – first place	2013 Shanghai	Team
Gold medal – first place	2017 Hong Kong	Individual
Gold medal – first place	2018 Bangkok	Team
Silver medal – second place	2015 Singapore	Team
Silver medal – second place	2017 Hong Kong	Team
Silver medal – second place	2024 Kuwait City	Team
Bronze medal – third place	2009 Doha	Individual
Bronze medal – third place	2010 Seoul	Team
Bronze medal – third place	2018 Bangkok	Individual

Ha Tae-gyu (Korean: 하태; Hanja: 河泰圭; born 20 December 1989) is a South Korean fencer. He won the gold medal in the men's team foil event at the 2018 Asian Games held in Jakarta, Indonesia. He also competed in the men's individual foil event.

In 2017, he competed in fencing at the Summer Universiade held in Taipei, Taiwan. In 2018, he competed in the men's foil event at the World Fencing Championships held in Wuxi, China.
