= Alessio Foconi =

Italian fencer (born 1989)

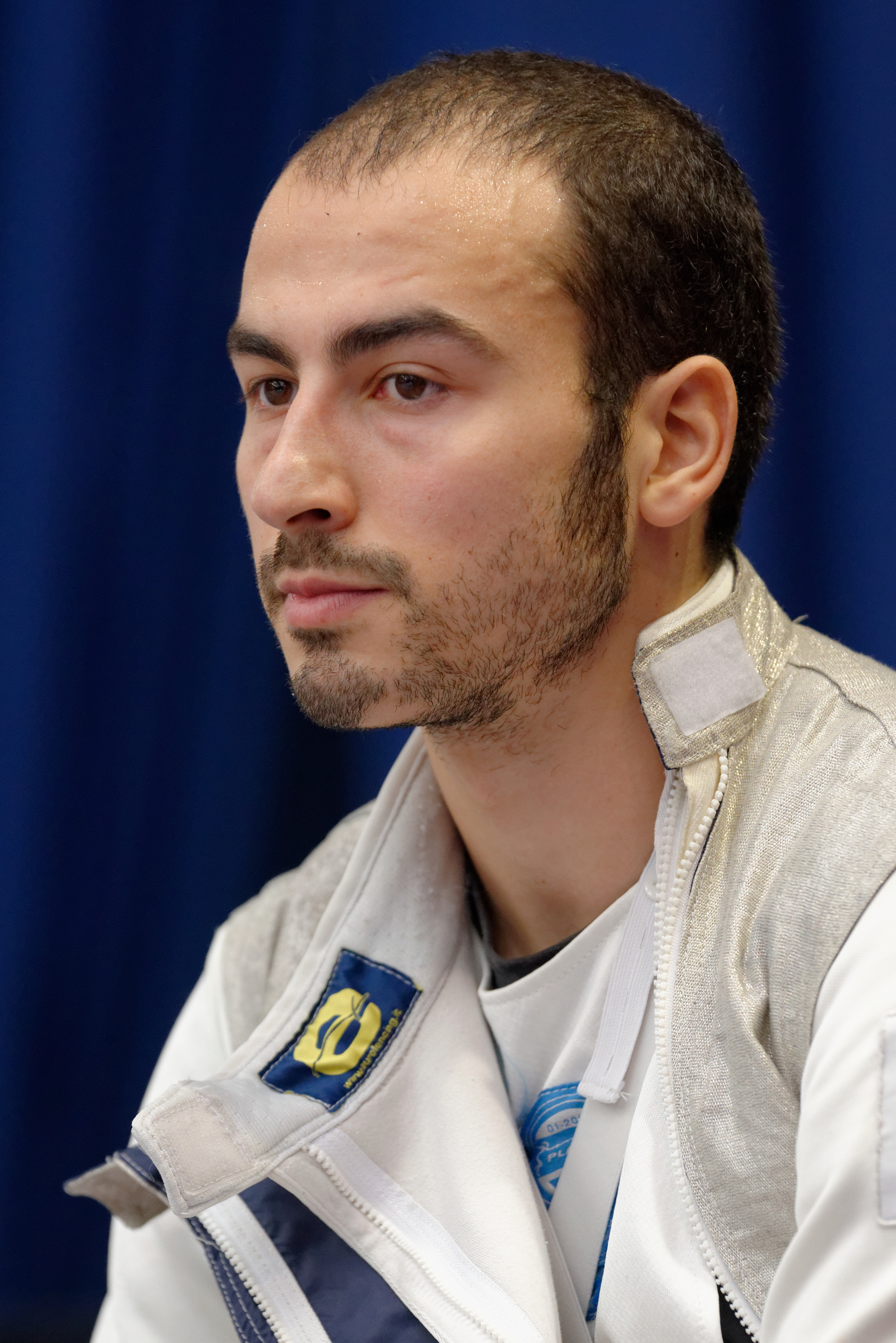
- Foconi in 2015

Personal information
- Born: 22 November 1989 (age 36) Rome, Italy
- Height: 1.80 m (5 ft 11 in)
- Weight: 80 kg (176 lb)

Fencing career
- Sport: Fencing
- Country: Italy
- Weapon: Foil
- Hand: right-handed
- National coach: Andrea Cipressa
- Club: CS Terni / CS Aeronautica Militare
- Head coach: Giulio Tomassini
- FIE ranking: current ranking
Medal record
Men's foil
Representing Italy
Olympic Games
Silver medal – second place	2024 Paris	Team
World Championships
Gold medal – first place	2017 Leipzig	Team
Gold medal – first place	2018 Wuxi	Individual
Gold medal – first place	2018 Wuxi	Team
Gold medal – first place	2022 Cairo	Team
Gold medal – first place	2025 Tbilisi	Team
Bronze medal – third place	2019 Budapest	Team
European Games
Gold medal – first place	2015 Baku	Individual
Gold medal – first place	2023 Kraków–Małopolska	Team
Silver medal – second place	2015 Baku	Team
European Championships
Gold medal – first place	2019 Düsseldorf	Individual
Gold medal – first place	2022 Antalya	Team
Gold medal – first place	2023 Kraków	Team
Gold medal – first place	2025 Genoa	Team
Silver medal – second place	2018 Novi Sad	Team
Silver medal – second place	2024 Basel	Individual
Bronze medal – third place	2017 Tbilisi	Team
Bronze medal – third place	2019 Düsseldorf	Team
Bronze medal – third place	2024 Basel	Team

Alessio Foconi (born 22 November 1989) is an Italian right-handed foil fencer and 2021 Olympian.

Foconi is a 2022 team European champion, 2019 individual European champion, four-time team world champion, and 2018 individual world champion.

== Career ==
Born in Rome, Foconi took up fencing in Terni, Umbria. He was coached in his formative years by Filippo Romagnoli and Giulio Tomassini.

In 2008 he created an upset at the Espinho World Cup after defeating Renal Ganeyev, Ruslan Nasibulin and Choi Byung-chul. He was stopped in the semifinals by fellow countryman and team Olympic champion Simone Vanni and came away with a bronze medal. The next year he won a team bronze medal at the Junior European Championships in Amsterdam and an individual bronze and a team gold at the Junior World Championships in Belfast.

In 2010–11 he took another World Cup bronze, this time at the Shanghai Grand Prix, and finished the season 25th in the world rankings. He did not qualify to the 2012 Summer Olympics, but maintained his Top 25 ranking. In 2013 he won the Italian championship after defeating Valerio Aspromonte in the final.

In the 2014–15 season Foconi bounced back in the World Cup circuit by posting a quarter-final finish in the Paris World Cup, then a bronze medal in the Löwe von Bonn.

== Medal record ==
=== World championship ===
Year	Location	Event	Position
2017	Leipzig, Germany	Team men's foil	1st
2018	Wuxi, China	Individual men's foil	1st
2018	Wuxi, China	Team men's foil	1st
2019	Budapest, Hungary	Team men's foil	3rd
2022	Cairo, Egypt	Team men's foil	1st
2025	(Georgia (country)) Tbilisi, Georgia	Team Men's Foil	1st

=== European championship ===
Year	Location	Event	Position
2017	(Georgia (country)) Tbilisi, Georgia	Team men's goil	3rd
2018	Novi Sad, Serbia	Team Men's Foil	2nd
2019	Düsseldorf, Germany	Individual men's foil	1st
2019	Düsseldorf, Germany	Team men's foil	3rd
2022	Antalya, Turkey	Team men's foil	1st

=== Grand Prix ===
Date	Location	Event	Position
2011-05-09	Shanghai, China	Individual men's foil	3rd
2016-06-03	Shanghai, China	Individual men's foil	3rd
2016-12-02	Turin, Italy	Individual men's foil	1st
2017-05-19	Shanghai, China	Individual men's foil	2nd
2017-12-01	Turin, Italy	Individual men's foil	3rd
2019-02-08	Turin, Italy	Individual men's foil	3rd
2019-03-15	(United States) Anaheim, California	Individual men's foil	3rd
2019-05-17	Shanghai, China	Individual men's foil	1st
2022-05-13	Incheon, South Korea	Individual men's foil	3rd

=== World Cup ===
Date	Location	Event	Position
2008-03-15	Espinho, Portugal	Individual men's foil	3rd
2015-02-06	Bonn, Germany	Individual men's foil	3rd
2016-10-21	Cairo, Egypt	Individual men's foil	2nd
2017-10-20	Cairo, Egypt	Individual men's foil	2nd
2018-01-19	Paris, France	Individual men's foil	1st
2018-05-04	St. Petersburg, Russia	Individual men's foil	2nd
2019-01-11	Paris, France	Individual men's foil	1st
2019-01-25	Tokyo, Japan	Individual men's foil	3rd
2019-05-03	St. Petersburg, Russia	Individual men's foil	2nd
2019-11-08	Bonn, Germany	Individual men's foil	3rd
2019-12-13	Tokyo, Japan	Individual men's foil	1st
2020-02-21	Cairo, Egypt	Individual men's foil	3rd
2022-01-14	Paris, France	Individual men's foil	3rd
2022-04-29	Plovdiv, Bulgaria	Individual men's foil	1st
