= Yeung Chi Ka (fencer) =

Hong Kong foil fencer (born 1994)

Personal information
- Nickname: Calugi
- Born: 19 August 1994 (age 32)

Fencing career
- Sport: Fencing
- Country: Hong Kong
- Weapon: Foil
- Hand: Right-handed
- Head coach: Gregory Koenig
- FIE ranking: current ranking
Medal record
Men's foil
Representing Hong Kong
World Championships
Bronze medal – third place	2023 Milan	Team
Asian Games
Silver medal – second place	2018 Jakarta	Team
Bronze medal – third place	2014 Incheon	Team
Bronze medal – third place	2022 Hangzhou	Team

Yeung Chi Ka (born 19 August 1994) is a right-handed Hong Kong foil fencer. He fences at the Hong Kong Sports Institute in Hong Kong, China. He is coached by Gregory Koenig of France.

== Notable results ==
- 6th out of 51 in Men's Foil at the Asian Championships in 2014
- 6th out of 57 in Senior Men's Foil at the Championnats asiatiques in 2014
- 5th out of 47 in Junior Men's Foil at the Championnats asiatiques in 2014.
- 3rd out of 14 in Team Men's Foil at the Asian Championships in 2019
- 5th out of 25 in Team Men's Foil at the Fencing World Championships in 2019
- 7th out of 22 in Team Men's Foil at the Fencing World Cup in 2022
- 6th out of 23 in Team Men's Foil at the Fencing World Cup in 2022
- 6th out of 26 in Team Men's Foil at the Fencing World Cup in 2023.
