= Jean-Paul Tony Helissey =

French fencer (born 1990)

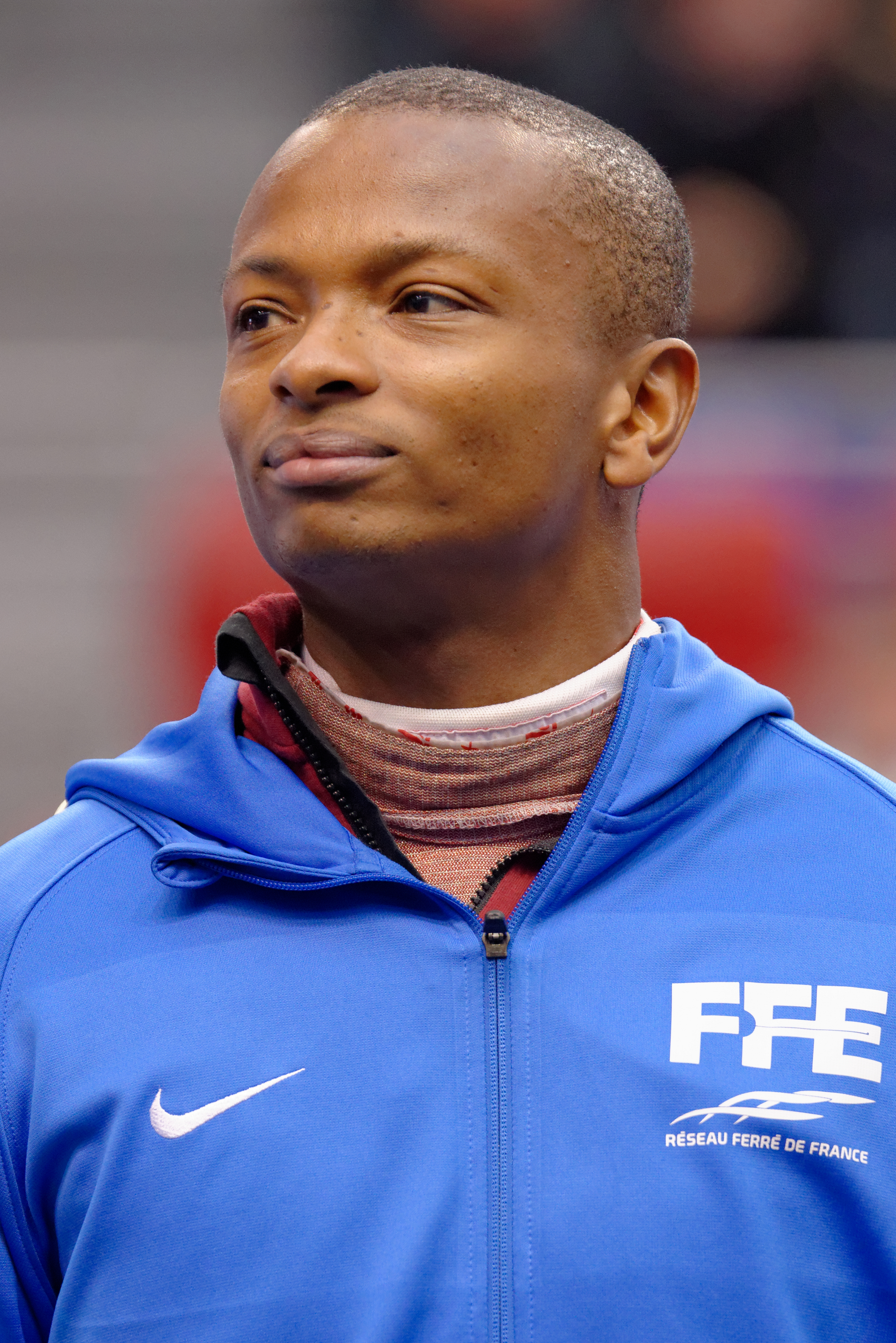
- Tony Helissey in 2015

Personal information
- Nationality: French
- Born: 28 March 1990 (age 36) Pointe-à-Pitre, Guadeloupe, France
- Height: 1.77 m (5 ft 10 in)
- Weight: 74 kg (163 lb)

Fencing career
- Sport: Fencing
- Country: France
- Weapon: Foil
- Hand: Left-handed
- FIE ranking: current ranking
Medal record
Representing France
Olympic Games
| Silver medal – second place | 2016 Rio de Janeiro | Team foil |
European Games
| Bronze medal – third place | 2015 Baku | Individual foil |

Jean-Paul Tony Helissey (born 3 March 1990) is a French foil fencer. He won a silver medal in the team competition at the 2016 Summer Olympics.
