= Fencing at the 2018 Asian Games – Men's individual foil =

Men's individual foil at the 2018 Asian Games
- Venue: Jakarta Convention Center
- Date: 21 August 2018
- Competitors: 29 from 16 nations

Medalists
gold medal	Huang Mengkai	China
silver medal	Nicholas Choi	Hong Kong
bronze medal	Cheung Ka Long	Hong Kong
bronze medal	Son Young-ki	South Korea

The men's individual foil competition at the 2018 Asian Games in Jakarta was held on 21 August at the Jakarta Convention Center. This event made its debut at the Asian Games since the seventh edition in 1974 Tehran. China led the medal tally by collecting five gold medals, while Japan and South Korea stand in the second and third position with 3 and 2 gold medals respectively. Huang Mengkai of China managed to claim the gold medal after won the final match against Nicholas Choi of Hong Kong with the score 11–10. Choi settled for the silver medal, and the bronze medal goes to Son Young-ki of South Korea and Cheung Ka Long of Hong Kong.

== Schedule ==
All times are Western Indonesia Time (UTC+07:00)

Date	Time	Event
Tuesday, 21 August 2018	10:45	Preliminaries
Tuesday, 21 August 2018	13:15	Round of 32
Tuesday, 21 August 2018	15:15	Round of 16
Tuesday, 21 August 2018	16:45	Quarterfinals
Tuesday, 21 August 2018	19:00	Semifinals
Tuesday, 21 August 2018	20:30	Gold medal match

== Results ==
=== Preliminaries ===
==== Pool A ====
Athlete	HKG	THA	PHI	VIE	INA
Cheung Ka Long (HKG)	—	5–0	5–3	5–0	5–1
Chornnasun Mayakarn (THA)	0–5	—	3–5	4–5	3–5
Nathaniel Perez (PHI)	3–5	5–3	—	0–5	5–2
Nguyễn Minh Quang (VIE)	0–5	5–4	5–0	—	5–2
Dennis Ariadinata Satriana (INA)	1–5	5–3	2–5	2–5	—

==== Pool B ====
Athlete	KOR	SGP	PHI	TPE	THA	CHN
Ha Tae-gyu (KOR)	—	5–2	5–3	5–2	1–5	5–1
Kevin Jerrold Chan (SGP)	2–5	—	1–5	5–3	5–2	3–5
Brennan Louie (PHI)	3–5	5–1	—	5–4	5–1	2–5
Chen Chih-chieh (TPE)	2–5	3–5	4–5	—	5–4	3–5
Sitsadipat Doungpatra (THA)	5–1	2–5	1–5	4–5	—	0–5
Ma Jianfei (CHN)	1–5	5–3	5–2	5–3	5–0	—

==== Pool C ====
Athlete	HKG	TPE	KAZ	MAC	MAS	QAT
Nicholas Choi (HKG)	—	5–1	5–1	5–2	5–0	5–0
Ou Feng-ming (TPE)	1–5	—	5–1	5–1	5–1	5–3
Tamirlan Kaliyev (KAZ)	1–5	1–5	—	5–1	1–5	5–1
Hoi Man Kit (MAC)	2–5	1–5	1–5	—	4–5	5–2
Cheng Xing Han (MAS)	0–5	1–5	5–1	5–4	—	5–2
Ahmed Al-Quradaghi (QAT)	0–5	3–5	1–5	2–5	2–5	—

==== Pool D ====
Athlete	CHN	JPN	VIE	SGP	NEP	CAM
Huang Mengkai (CHN)	—	3–5	5–1	4–5	5–0	5–1
Takahiro Shikine (JPN)	5–3	—	5–3	5–1	5–0	5–0
Hoàng Ngọc Hiếu (VIE)	1–5	3–5	—	5–1	5–1	5–1
Joshua Lim (SGP)	5–4	1–5	1–5	—	5–1	5–1
Mahesh Prasad Bhatt (NEP)	0–5	0–5	1–5	1–5	—	3–5
Chim Theara (CAM)	1–5	0–5	1–5	1–5	5–3	—

==== Pool E ====
Athlete	JPN	KOR	INA	MAS	NEP	QAT
Toshiya Saito (JPN)	—	1–5	5–1	5–0	5–2	5–0
Son Young-ki (KOR)	5–1	—	5–2	5–4	5–1	5–1
Mohammad Zulfikar (INA)	1–5	2–5	—	3–5	5–0	5–1
Hans Yoong (MAS)	0–5	4–5	5–3	—	5–0	5–2
Sanjeep Lama (NEP)	2–5	1–5	0–5	0–5	—	1–5
Ali Owaida (QAT)	0–5	1–5	1–5	2–5	5–1	—

==== Summary ====
Rank	Pool	Athlete	W	L	W/M	TD	TF
1	C	Nicholas Choi (HKG)	5	0	1.000	+21	25
2	D	Takahiro Shikine (JPN)	5	0	1.000	+18	25
3	E	Son Young-ki (KOR)	5	0	1.000	+16	25
4	A	Cheung Ka Long (HKG)	4	0	1.000	+16	20
5	E	Toshiya Saito (JPN)	4	1	0.800	+13	21
6	C	Ou Feng-ming (TPE)	4	1	0.800	+10	21
7	B	Ma Jianfei (CHN)	4	1	0.800	+8	21
7	B	Ha Tae-gyu (KOR)	4	1	0.800	+8	21
9	A	Nguyễn Minh Quang (VIE)	3	1	0.750	+4	15
10	D	Huang Mengkai (CHN)	3	2	0.600	+10	22
11	D	Hoàng Ngọc Hiếu (VIE)	3	2	0.600	+6	19
12	B	Brennan Louie (PHI)	3	2	0.600	+4	20
13	E	Hans Yoong (MAS)	3	2	0.600	+4	19
14	D	Joshua Lim (SGP)	3	2	0.600	+1	17
15	C	Cheng Xing Han (MAS)	3	2	0.600	−1	16
16	A	Nathaniel Perez (PHI)	2	2	0.500	−2	13
17	E	Mohammad Zulfikar (INA)	2	3	0.400	0	16
18	B	Kevin Jerrold Chan (SGP)	2	3	0.400	−4	16
19	C	Tamirlan Kaliyev (KAZ)	2	3	0.400	−4	13
20	A	Dennis Ariadinata Satriana (INA)	1	3	0.250	−8	10
21	B	Chen Chih-chieh (TPE)	1	4	0.200	−7	17
22	C	Hoi Man Kit (MAC)	1	4	0.200	−9	13
23	B	Sitsadipat Doungpatra (THA)	1	4	0.200	−9	12
24	E	Ali Owaida (QAT)	1	4	0.200	−12	9
25	D	Chim Theara (CAM)	1	4	0.200	−15	8
26	A	Chornnasun Mayakarn (THA)	0	4	0.000	−10	10
27	C	Ahmed Al-Quradaghi (QAT)	0	5	0.000	−17	8
28	D	Mahesh Prasad Bhatt (NEP)	0	5	0.000	−20	5
29	E	Sanjeep Lama (NEP)	0	5	0.000	−21	4

=== Knockout round ===
==== Final ====
Gold medal match
1	Nicholas Choi (HKG)	10
10	Huang Mengkai (CHN)	11

==== Top half ====
Round of 32
17	Mohammad Zulfikar (INA)	10
16	Nathaniel Perez (PHI)	15
21	Chen Chih-chieh (TPE)	15
12	Brennan Louie (PHI)	13
13	Hans Yoong (MAS)	8
20	Dennis Ariadinata Satriana (INA)	15

Round of 16
1	Nicholas Choi (HKG)	15
16	Nathaniel Perez (PHI)	6
9	Nguyễn Minh Quang (VIE)	5
8	Ha Tae-gyu (KOR)	15
5	Toshiya Saito (JPN)	15
21	Chen Chih-chieh (TPE)	12
20	Dennis Ariadinata Satriana (INA)	4
4	Cheung Ka Long (HKG)	15

Quarterfinals
1	Nicholas Choi (HKG)	15
8	Ha Tae-gyu (KOR)	11
5	Toshiya Saito (JPN)	3
4	Cheung Ka Long (HKG)	15

Semifinals
1	Nicholas Choi (HKG)	15
4	Cheung Ka Long (HKG)	9

==== Bottom half ====
Round of 32
19	Tamirlan Kaliyev (KAZ)	10
14	Joshua Lim (SGP)	15
11	Hoàng Ngọc Hiếu (VIE)	15
22	Hoi Man Kit (MAC)	9
23	Sitsadipat Doungpatra (THA)	3
10	Huang Mengkai (CHN)	15
15	Cheng Xing Han (MAS)	8
18	Kevin Jerrold Chan (SGP)	15

Round of 16
3	Son Young-ki (KOR)	15
14	Joshua Lim (SGP)	6
11	Hoàng Ngọc Hiếu (VIE)	9
6	Ou Feng-ming (TPE)	15
7	Ma Jianfei (CHN)	9
10	Huang Mengkai (CHN)	15
18	Kevin Jerrold Chan (SGP)	15
2	Takahiro Shikine (JPN)	12

Quarterfinals
3	Son Young-ki (KOR)	15
6	Ou Feng-ming (TPE)	8
10	Huang Mengkai (CHN)	15
18	Kevin Jerrold Chan (SGP)	11

Semifinals
3	Son Young-ki (KOR)	6
10	Huang Mengkai (CHN)	15

== Final standing ==
Rank	Athlete
1st place, gold medalist(s)	Huang Mengkai (CHN)
2nd place, silver medalist(s)	Nicholas Choi (HKG)
3rd place, bronze medalist(s)	Cheung Ka Long (HKG)
3rd place, bronze medalist(s)	Son Young-ki (KOR)
5	Toshiya Saito (JPN)
6	Ou Feng-ming (TPE)
7	Ha Tae-gyu (KOR)
8	Kevin Jerrold Chan (SGP)
9	Takahiro Shikine (JPN)
10	Ma Jianfei (CHN)
11	Nguyễn Minh Quang (VIE)
12	Hoàng Ngọc Hiếu (VIE)
13	Joshua Lim (SGP)
14	Nathaniel Perez (PHI)
15	Dennis Ariadinata Satriana (INA)
16	Chen Chih-chieh (TPE)
17	Brennan Louie (PHI)
18	Hans Yoong (MAS)
19	Cheng Xing Han (MAS)
20	Mohammad Zulfikar (INA)
21	Tamirlan Kaliyev (KAZ)
22	Hoi Man Kit (MAC)
23	Sitsadipat Doungpatra (THA)
24	Ali Owaida (QAT)
25	Chim Theara (CAM)
26	Chornnasun Mayakarn (THA)
27	Ahmed Al-Quradaghi (QAT)
28	Mahesh Prasad Bhatt (NEP)
29	Sanjeep Lama (NEP)
