= Nicholas Choi =

Hong Kong fencer

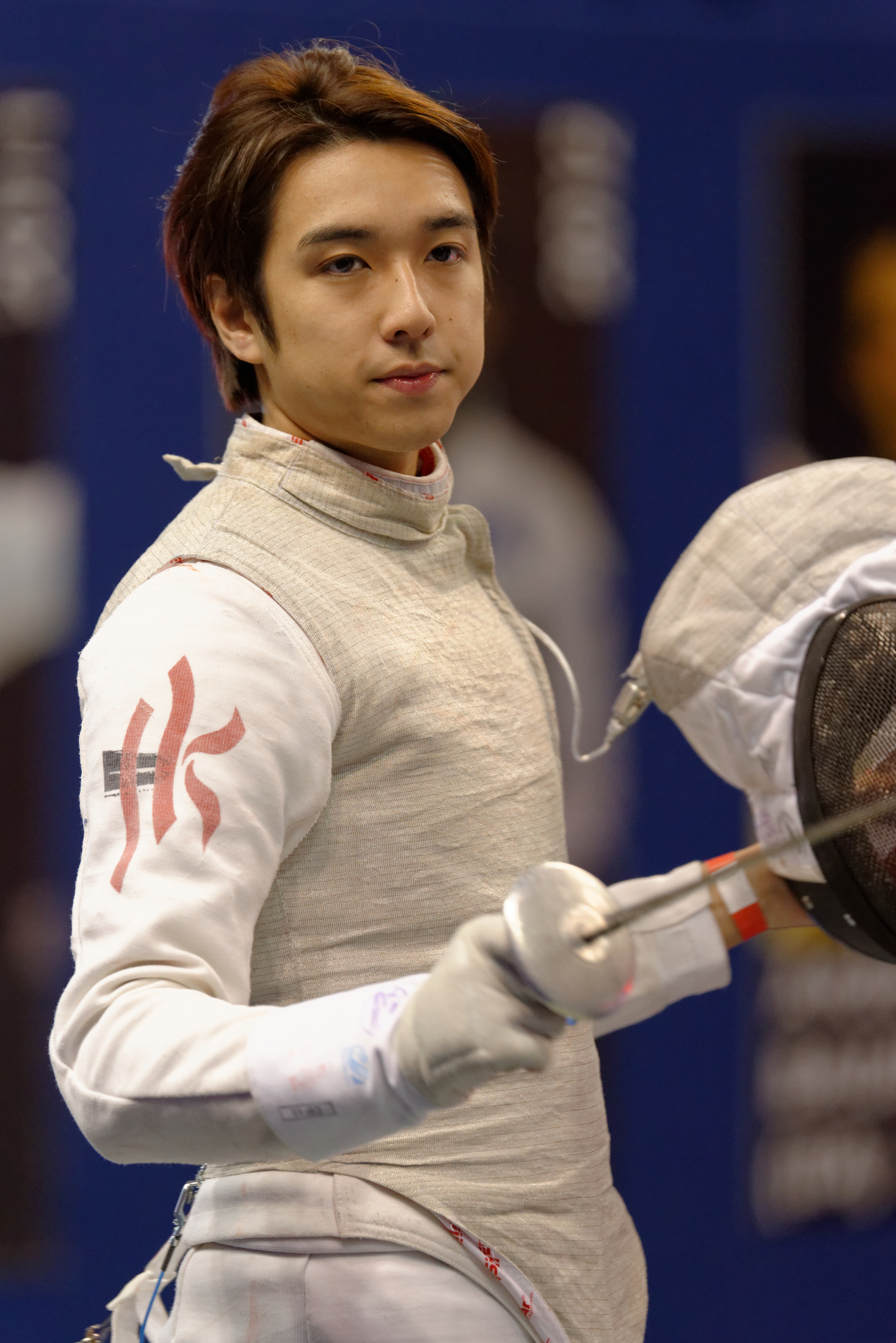
- Choi in 2015

Personal information
- Full name: Nicholas Edward Choi
- Born: 20 January 1993 (age 33) British Hong Kong
- Height: 1.75 m (5 ft 9 in)
- Weight: 65 kg (143 lb)

Fencing career
- Sport: Fencing
- Weapon: foil
- Hand: right-handed
- FIE ranking: current ranking
Medal record
Men's Foil
Representing Hong Kong
Grand Prix
Bronze medal – third place	2018 Anaheim	Individual
Asian Games
Silver medal – second place	2018 Jakarta	Individual
Silver medal – second place	2018 Jakarta	Team
Bronze medal – third place	2014 Incheon	Team
Bronze medal – third place	2022 Hangzhou	Team
Asian Championships
Silver medal – second place	2018 Bangkok	Team
Bronze medal – third place	2011 Seoul	Team
Bronze medal – third place	2012 Wakayama	Team
Bronze medal – third place	2013 Shanghai	Team
Bronze medal – third place	2014 Suwon	Team
Bronze medal – third place	2015 Singapore	Team
Bronze medal – third place	2016 Wuxi	Team
Bronze medal – third place	2017 Hong Kong	Team
East Asian Games
Gold medal – first place	2013 Tianjin	Team
Bronze medal – third place	2013 Tianjin	Individual

Nicholas Edward Choi (Chinese: 崔浩然; Jyutping: ceoi^{1} hou^{5} jin^{4}, born 20 January 1993) is a Hong Kong foil fencer.

== Career ==
Choi took up fencing in 2002 while he was in primary school. He thought that the sport was cool because of the lights going off at each hit. His younger sister, Natasha Erica, followed his example. When she was selected into the Hong Kong Sports Institute junior fencing team, his pride was piqued and he resolved to train harder until he was selected in his turn.

In 2010, he was the second-placed Asian at the Cadet World Championships in Baku, qualifying for the 2010 Summer Youth Olympics. He was defeated in the table of 16 by Denmark's Alexander Tsoronis and finished 9th. He was then drafted into the Hong Kong's senior fencing team and began to study at the Institute of Vocational Education, Chai Wan. At the 2011 Asian Championships, he reached the quarter-finals after seeing off Olympic silver medallist Yuki Ota.

At the age of 19, Choi qualified for the 2012 Summer Olympics as the second-ranked Asian, becoming the youngest fencer to represent Hong Kong at the Olympics. Despite losing in the first round to Romania's Radu Dărăban, he received a “Hong Kong Potential Sports Star Award” for his achievement.

In 2018, Choi won two silver medals in the men's foil individual and team event at the Asian Games in Jakarta, Indonesia, which is the best-ever result of Hong Kong fencers. He retired shortly after the competition but announced his return in April 2021, targeting for Paris Olympics.

== Personal life ==
Choi is a mixed-race child of Chinese, Korean and Filipino descent (father is Chinese-Korean mixed, mother is Filipino). His father is the leader of the Hong Kong fencing team; his elder sister serves as the head of English at a Direct Subsidy Scheme secondary school on Lantau Island; and his younger twin sister Natasha Choi was also a fencing player. Choi studied at Lam Tai Fai College and took the Hong Kong Certificate of Education Examination (HKCEE) in 2010. He was a candidate for the last cohort of the HKCEE. He is a friend of Jackson Wang, a former member of the Hong Kong Fencing Team and the Korean group Got7.
