= Huang Mengkai =

Chinese fencer (born 1997)

Personal information
- Native name: 黄梦恺
- Born: 6 September 1997 (age 28)

Fencing career
- Sport: Fencing
- Country: China
- Weapon: Foil
- Hand: Left-handed
Medal record
Men's foil fencing
Representing China
Asian Games
Gold medal – first place	2018 Jakarta	Individual
Bronze medal – third place	2018 Jakarta	Team
Junior World Championships
Silver medal – second place	2015 Tashkent	Team
Bronze medal – third place	2015 Tashkent	Individual
Asian Fencing Championships
Silver medal – second place	2019 Chiba	Team
Bronze medal – third place	2018 Bangkok	Individual

Huang Mengkai (simplified Chinese: 黄梦恺; traditional Chinese: 黃夢愷; pinyin: Huáng Mèngkǎi; born 6 September 1997) is a Chinese foil fencer. He won the men's foil event at the 2018 Asian Games in Jakarta, Indonesia. He also won the bronze medal in the men's team foil event.

In 2014, he competed in fencing at the Summer Youth Olympics held in Nanjing, however, China did not win a medal. In 2021, he competed in the men's foil event at the 2020 Summer Olympics held in Tokyo, Japan.
