= Thomas Berg =

American legal scholar

Thomas C. Berg
- Occupation: Law professor

Academic background
- Education: University of Chicago Divinity School University of Chicago Law School; Lincoln College, Oxford Northwestern University

Academic work
- Discipline: Law
- Sub-discipline: Constitutional law
- Institutions: University of St. Thomas School of Law

Thomas C. Berg is an American legal scholar with specialties in constitutional law and law and religion, who is James L. Oberstar Professor of Law and Public Policy at the University of St. Thomas. He has authored numerous briefs considering religious liberty and related issues, including many for cases appearing before the United States Supreme Court. He is the editor of a leading law and religion casebook, Religion and the Constitution, with Michael W. McConnell, Christopher C. Lund, and, previously, John H. Garvey.
