= Heo Jun (fencer) =

South Korean fencer (born 1988)

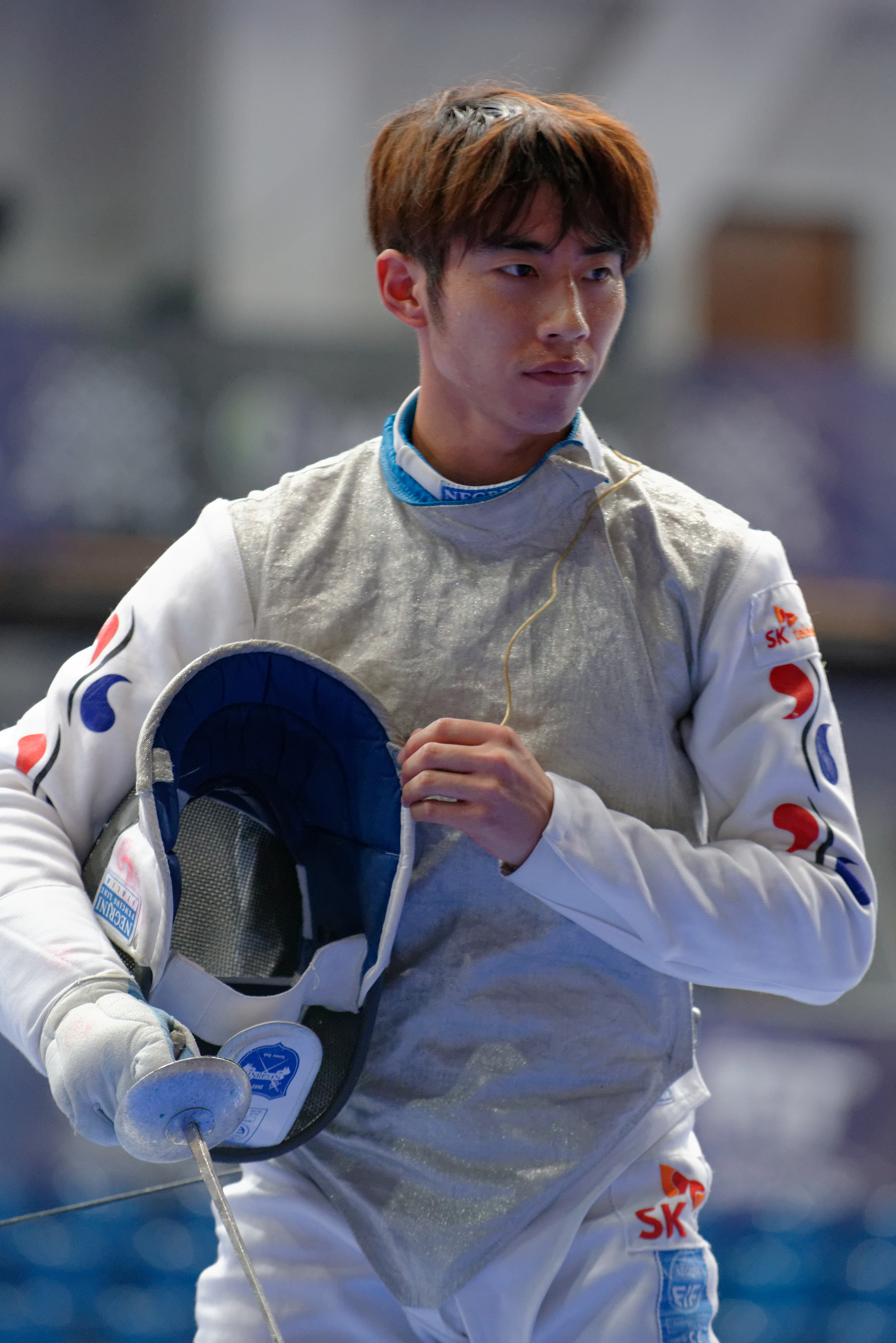
- Heo at the 2013 World Fencing Championships

Personal information
- Nationality: South Korean
- Born: 31 May 1988 (age 38) Seoul, South Korea
- Height: 1.68 m (5 ft 6 in)
- Weight: 58 kg (128 lb)

Fencing career
- Sport: Fencing
- Weapon: foil
- Hand: right-handed
- National coach: Jo Hui-je
- Club: Gwangju Fencing Club
- FIE ranking: current ranking
Medal record
Men's fencing
Representing South Korea
Asian Games
Gold medal – first place	2018 Jakarta	Team
Gold medal – first place	2022 Hangzhou	Team
Silver medal – second place	2014 Incheon	Individual
Bronze medal – third place	2010 Guangzhou	Team
Bronze medal – third place	2014 Incheon	Team
World Championships
Bronze medal – third place	2018 Wuxi	Individual
Asian Championships
Gold medal – first place	2012 Wakayama	Team
Gold medal – first place	2013 Shanghai	Team
Gold medal – first place	2013 Shanghai	Individual
Gold medal – first place	2014 Suwon	Individual
Silver medal – second place	2014 Suwon	Team
Bronze medal – third place	2010 Seoul	Team

Heo Jun (Korean: 허준; Hanja: 許俊; Korean pronunciation: [hʌ.dʑun] or [hʌ] [tɕun]; born 31 May 1988) is a South Korean foil fencer. He is the four-time Asian champion (individual and team). He won a bronze medal at the 2011 Summer Universiade in Shenzhen. Heo is a graduate of Daegu University.
