= Richard Kruse =

British fencer (born 1983)

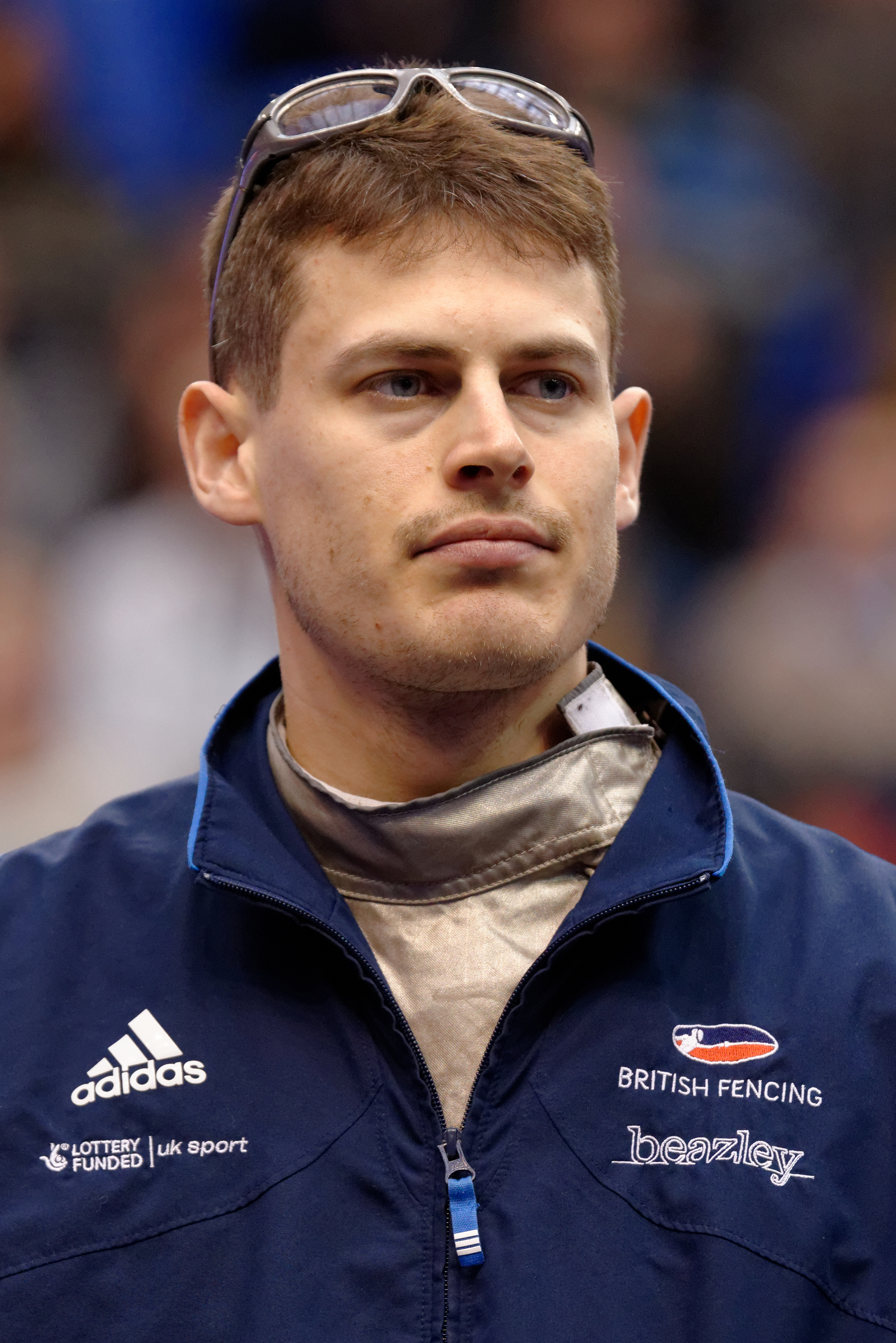

Personal information
- Full name: Richard Adam Kruse
- Nationality: British
- Born: 30 July 1983 (age 43) London, England
- Home town: London, England
- Height: 1.89 m (6 ft 2 in)
- Weight: 80 kg (176 lb)

Fencing career
- Sport: Fencing
- Country: Great Britain
- Weapon: Foil
- Hand: Right-handed
- National coach: Ziemowit Wojciechowski
- Club: ZFW
- FIE ranking: Current Ranking
Medal record
World Championships
Silver medal – second place	2018 Wuxi	Individual
World Combat Games
Gold medal – first place	2013 Saint Petersburg	Individual
European Games
Gold medal – first place	2015 Baku	Team
European Championships
Silver medal – second place	2006 Izmir	Individual
Silver medal – second place	2009 Plovdiv	Individual
Bronze medal – third place	2010 Leipzig	Individual
Bronze medal – third place	2010 Leipzig	Team
Bronze medal – third place	2012 Legnano	Individual
Bronze medal – third place	2013 Zagreb	Team
Bronze medal – third place	2016 Torun	Team

Richard Kruse (born 30 July 1983) is a former British right-handed foil fencer and four-time Olympian. In 2015, he was part of the Great Britain team that shocked Olympic champions Italy to win the first European Games gold in team foil, the first British gold medal in a team fencing event at World or European level for fifty years. He retired in 2021.

== Career ==
Kruse won his first international medal, a silver, at the 2001 European Under 20 Championships and in 2002 won gold in at the same event.

He made his Olympic debut at the 2004 Games in Athens, Greece. Competing in the men's individual foil. He received a bye in the first round, beat China's Wang Haibin in round two and Dan Kellner of the United States in the third round before being defeated 8–15 by Andrea Cassarà in the quarter-finals. His eighth-place finish was the best by a British fencer since the 1992 Summer Olympics in Barcelona, when Fiona McIntosh was eighth in the women's foil, and the best by a British man since the 1964 Summer Olympics in Tokyo, when Bill Hoskyns won the silver medal in the individual épée. In 2006 Kruse won the silver medal in the men's foil event at the European Fencing Championships.

At the 2008 Summer Olympics in Beijing, China, Kruse again participated in the men's individual foil event. He defeated Virgil Sălișcan of Romania in the round of 32 but was eliminated at the last 16 stage after a 9–10 loss to Germany's Peter Joppich. He finished 14th.

In 2009 Kruse had his most successful season to date. He won a gold medal at the World Cup event in Copenhagen and a silver medal in Paris, then gold in Venice before winning a silver medal at the 2009 European Fencing Championships held in Plovdiv, Bulgaria. Kruse finished the season ranked fourth in the world.

At the 2011 World Cup event in Seoul, South Korea, Kruse won the silver medal in the men's foil. he won five matches, including a 15–11 defeat of compatriot Laurence Halsted in the last eight to reach the final against Andrea Baldini of Italy. Baldini won the final by a single point, 15–14 to take the gold medal.

Kruse is coached by former Polish Olympian turned British national Ziemowit Wojciechowski. He is also a coach for his ZFW fencing club.

In 2012, Richard Kruse won bronze at the Wakayama Grand Prix. Only 2 months later he claimed another bronze at the European Championships in Legnano, having been seeded 45th after the poule stages. At the London Olympics later that year, he finished 17th in the men's individual event, losing to Artur Akhmatkhuzin in the last 32. He was part of the British team that came 6th, losing to Italy in the quarter-finals and then beating France and losing to Russia in the ranking rounds.

In 2016 Kruse again attended the Olympic Games in Rio. He placed fourth overall in the Men's Individual Foil, losing to Timur Safin of Russia in the Bronze Medal Match.

In 2018 Kruse won silver in the individual men's foil event at the World Championships in Wuxi, China.

After winning gold at the Prince Takamodo World Cup in Tokyo, on 26 January 2019, he was ranked number one in the world, the first British fencer to achieve that position.

Kruse retired in May 2021. He now works as a fencing coach for Salle Paul Fencing Club in Hendon. When he retired in 2021, he had been a six times British fencing champion, winning six foil titles at the British Fencing Championships, from 2001 to 2018.

== Medal Record ==
=== World Championship ===
Year	Location	Event	Position
2018	Wuxi, China	Individual Men's Foil	2nd

=== European Championship ===
Year	Location	Event	Position
2006	İzmir, Turkey	Individual Men's Foil	3rd
2009	Plovdiv, Bulgaria	Individual Men's Foil	2nd
2010	Leipzig, Germany	Individual Men's Foil	3rd
2010	Leipzig, Germany	Team Men's Foil	3rd
2012	Legnano, Italy	Individual Men's Foil	3rd
2013	Zagreb, Croatia	Team Men's Foil	3rd
2016	Toruń, Poland	Team Men's Foil	3rd

=== Grand Prix ===
Date	Location	Event	Position
2009-01-23	Paris, France	Individual Men's Foil	2nd
2009-02-13	Venice, Italy	Individual Men's Foil	1st
2010-05-24	St. Petersburg, Russia	Individual Men's Foil	2nd
2012-04-28	Wakayama, Japan	Individual Men's Foil	3rd
2015-11-27	Turin, Italy	Individual Men's Foil	2nd
2016-03-11	Havana, Cuba	Individual Men's Foil	1st
2017-05-19	Shanghai, China	Individual Men's Foil	1st
2018-05-19	Shanghai, China	Individual Men's Foil	1st

=== World Cup ===
Date	Location	Event	Position
2008-01-05	Copenhagen, Denmark	Individual Men's Foil	3rd
2009-01-17	Copenhagen, Denmark	Individual Men's Foil	1st
2010-01-16	Copenhagen, Denmark	Individual Men's Foil	1st
2010-05-09	Seoul, South Korea	Individual Men's Foil	2nd
2011-05-10	Seoul, South Korea	Individual Men's Foil	2nd
2014-04-25	Seoul, South Korea	Individual Men's Foil	3rd
2017-10-20	Cairo, Egypt	Individual Men's Foil	1st
2018-11-09	Bonn, Germany	Individual Men's Foil	1st
2019-01-25	Tokyo, Japan	Individual Men's Foil	1st
