= Coco Lin =

Hong Kong fencer (born 1995)

Personal information
- Full name: Coco Lin Yik-hei
- Nationality: Hong Kong
- Born: 19 February 1995 (age 31)

Sport
- Sport: Fencing
Medal record
Women's épée fencing
Representing Hong Kong
Asian Fencing Championships
Bronze medal – third place	2024 Kuwait City	Team

Coco Lin Yik-hei (born 19 February 1995) is an épée fencer from Hong Kong. She competed in the 2020 Summer Olympics.
