= Cheung Siu Lun =

Hong Kong fencer

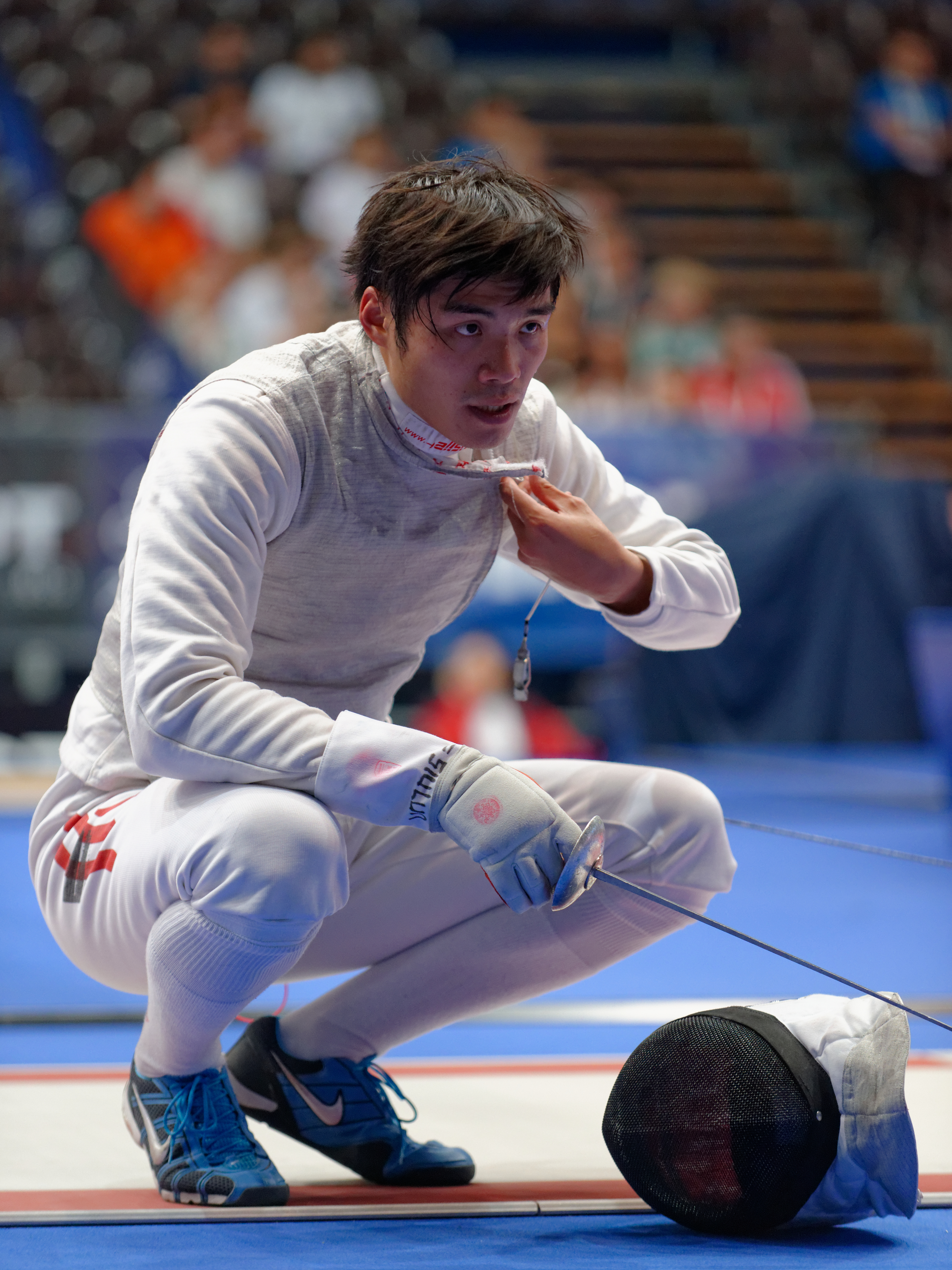
- Cheung in 2013

Personal information
- Nationality: Hong Kong
- Born: 18 July 1985 (age 40)

Fencing career
- Sport: Fencing
- Weapon: Foil
- FIE ranking: current ranking
Medal record
Men's Foil
Representing Hong Kong
Asian Games
Silver medal – second place	2010 Guangzhou	Individual
Bronze medal – third place	2010 Guangzhou	Team
Bronze medal – third place	2014 Incheon	Team
Asian Championships
Gold medal – first place	2018 Bangkok	Individual
Silver medal – second place	2018 Bangkok	Team
Bronze medal – third place	2007 Nantong	Team
Bronze medal – third place	2008 Bangkok	Team
Bronze medal – third place	2009 Doha	Team
Bronze medal – third place	2010 Seoul	Team
Bronze medal – third place	2011 Seoul	Team
Bronze medal – third place	2012 Wakayama	Team
Bronze medal – third place	2013 Shanghai	Individual
Bronze medal – third place	2013 Shanghai	Team
Bronze medal – third place	2014 Suwon	Team
Bronze medal – third place	2015 Singapore	Team
Bronze medal – third place	2016 Wuxi	Team
Bronze medal – third place	2017 Hong Kong	Team
Bronze medal – third place	2019 Chiba	Team
East Asian Games
Gold medal – first place	2013 Tianjin	Team

Shawn Cheung Siu Lun (Chinese: 張小倫; born 18 July 1985) is a Hong Kong fencer. He competed in the men's team foil event at the 2020 Summer Olympics. He has a talk show called "大師兄Friend嚟喇" on "ChillGOOD TV" YouTube channel since 2022.

== Filmography ==
=== Drama ===
Year	Title	Role	Network	Note
2003	Hearts of Fencing	Au Yeung Yat	TVB	Double actor of fencing
