= Son Young-ki =

South Korean foil fencer

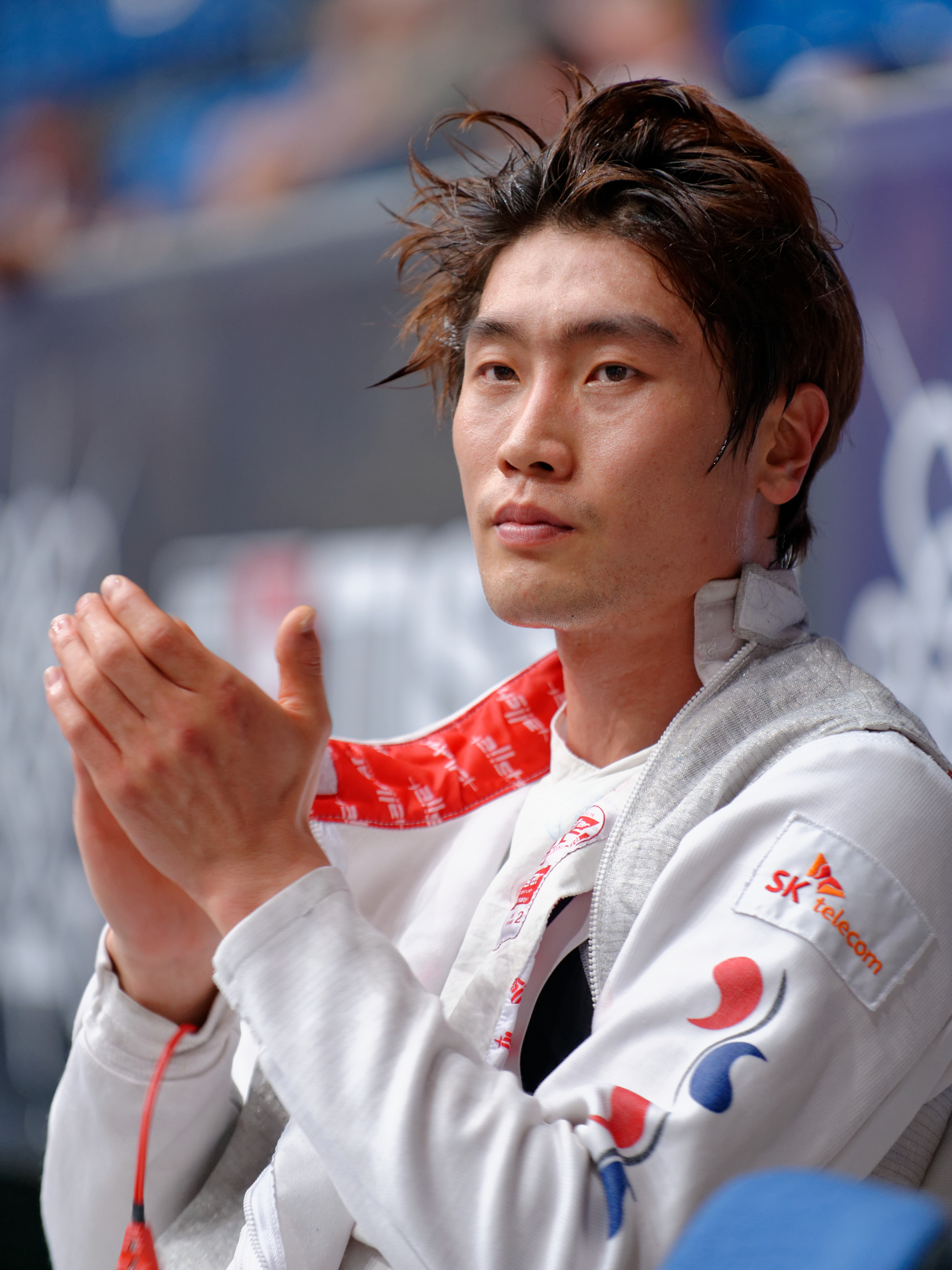

Personal information
- Born: 30 May 1985 (age 41)

Fencing career
- Sport: Fencing
- Country: South Korea
- Weapon: Foil
- Hand: right-handed
- National coach: Kim Byung-Soo
- Club: Daejeon City Corporation
- Head coach: Lee Young-Rok
- FIE ranking: current ranking
Medal record
World Championships
Bronze medal – third place	2007 St. Petersburg	Team
Bronze medal – third place	2019 Budapest	Individual
Asian Championships
Gold medal – first place	2013 Shanghai	Team
Gold medal – first place	2016 Wuxi	Team
Gold medal – first place	2018 Bangkok	Team
Silver medal – second place	2015 Singapore	Individual
Silver medal – second place	2014 Suwon	Team
Silver medal – second place	2015 Singapore	Team
Silver medal – second place	2017 Hong Kong	Team
Bronze medal – third place	2017 Hong Kong	Individual

Son Young-ki (Korean: 손영기, born 30 May 1985) is a South Korean foil fencer. He won several gold medals at the Asian Fencing Championships. During the 2019 World Fencing Championships he won a bronze medal.
