= Men's foil at the 2014 World Fencing Championships =

The Men's foil event of the 2014 World Fencing Championships was held on 19 July 2014. A qualification was held on 16 July.

== Medalists ==
Gold	Aleksey Cheremisinov (RUS)
Silver	Ma Jianfei (CHN)
Bronze	Enzo Lefort (FRA)
Bronze	Timur Safin (RUS)

== Draw ==
=== Finals ===
Semi-finals
(France) Enzo Lefort	8
(Russia) Aleksey Cheremisinov	15
(Russia) Timur Safin	14
(China) Ma Jianfei	15

Final
(Russia) Aleksey Cheremisinov	15
(China) Ma Jianfei	11

=== Top half ===
==== Section 1 ====
Round of 64
1	(France) Enzo Lefort	15
64	(Belarus) Aliaksandr Lukashevich	12
33	(Austria) Rene Pranz	15
32	(Croatia) Bojan Jovanović	11
17	(China) Lei Sheng	15
48	(Venezuela) Jhon Pérez	5
49	(Czech Republic) Jan Krejčík	5
16	(Russia) Dmitry Rigin	15
9	(United Kingdom) James-Andrew Davis	15
56	(Austria) Johannes Poscharnig	11
41	(Belarus) Aliaksandr Chaliankov	7
24	(Brazil) Ghislain Perrier	15
25	(Poland) Leszek Rajski	15
40	(Japan) Suguru Awaji	10
57	(Belarus) Siarhei Byk	15
8	(Italy) Valerio Aspromonte	14

Round of 32
1	(France) Enzo Lefort	15
33	(Austria) Rene Pranz	6
17	(China) Lei Sheng	14
16	(Russia) Dmitry Rigin	15
9	(United Kingdom) James-Andrew Davis	15
24	(Brazil) Ghislain Perrier	12
25	(Poland) Leszek Rajski	15
57	(Belarus) Siarhei Byk	7

Round of 16
1	(France) Enzo Lefort	15
16	(Russia) Dmitry Rigin	12
9	(United Kingdom) James-Andrew Davis	15
25	(Poland) Leszek Rajski	10

Quarterfinals
1	(France) Enzo Lefort	15
9	(United Kingdom) James-Andrew Davis	6

==== Section 2 ====
Round of 64
5	(Russia) Aleksey Cheremisinov	15
60	(Republic of Ireland) Brendan Cusack	3
37	(China) Chen Haiwei	15
28	(Hong Kong) Choi Nicholas Edward	8
21	(Poland) Michał Majewski	15
44	(Hungary) András Németh	6
53	(Egypt) Alaaeldin Abouelkassem	15
12	(South Korea) Heo Jun	6
13	(United States) Race Imboden	15
52	(China) Shi Jialuo	4
45	(Canada) Anthony Prymack	13
20	(Hong Kong) Cheung Ka Long	15
29	(Ukraine) Volodymyr Koltygo	15
36	(Hong Kong) Yeung Chi Ka	14
61	(Argentina) Felipe Saucedo	13
4	(United States) Gerek Meinhardt	15

Round of 32
5	(Russia) Aleksey Cheremisinov	15
37	(China) Chen Haiwei	12
21	(Poland) Michał Majewski	13
53	(Egypt) Alaaeldin Abouelkassem	15
13	(United States) Race Imboden	15
20	(Hong Kong) Cheung Ka Long	8
29	(Ukraine) Volodymyr Koltygo	7
4	(United States) Gerek Meinhardt	15

Round of 16
5	(Russia) Aleksey Cheremisinov	15
53	(Egypt) Alaaeldin Abouelkassem	12
13	(United States) Race Imboden	11
4	(United States) Gerek Meinhardt	15

Quarterfinals
5	(Russia) Aleksey Cheremisinov	15
4	(United States) Gerek Meinhardt	9

=== Bottom half ===
==== Section 3 ====
Round of 64
3	(Italy) Andrea Cassarà	15
62	(Mexico) Jesús Beltran	10
35	(South Korea) Kim Min-kyu	15
30	(Poland) Paweł Kawiecki	12
19	(Russia) Timur Safin	15
46	(South Korea) Kim Hyo-gon	7
51	(Israel) Maor Hatoel	14
14	(Germany) Peter Joppich	15
11	(Italy) Andrea Baldini	10
54	(Israel) Tomer Or	15
43	(South Korea) Son Young-ki	15
22	(Hong Kong) Cheung Siu Lun	12
27	(United Kingdom) Richard Kruse	8
38	(Germany) Sebastian Bachmann	15
59	(Egypt) Tarek Ayad	12
6	(United States) Miles Chamley-Watson	15

Round of 32
3	(Italy) Andrea Cassarà	13
35	(South Korea) Kim Min-kyu	15
19	(Russia) Timur Safin	15
14	(Germany) Peter Joppich	6
54	(Israel) Tomer Or	12
43	(South Korea) Son Young-ki	14
38	(Germany) Sebastian Bachmann	15
6	(United States) Miles Chamley-Watson	7

Round of 16
35	(South Korea) Kim Min-kyu	7
19	(Russia) Timur Safin	15
43	(South Korea) Son Young-ki	10
38	(Germany) Sebastian Bachmann	15

Quarterfinals
19	(Russia) Timur Safin	15
38	(Germany) Sebastian Bachmann	12

==== Section 4 ====
Round of 64
7	(United States) Alexander Massialas	15
58	(Canada) Maximilien van Haaster	8
39	(Austria) Mario Langer	9
26	(France) Vincent Simon	15
23	(Ukraine) Klod Yunes	5
42	(Denmark) Alexander Tsoronis	15
55	(United Kingdom) Marcus Mepstead	11
10	(Czech Republic) Alexander Choupenitch	15
15	(Japan) Yuki Ota	15
50	(Russia) Aleksey Khovanskiy	4
47	(Brazil) Guilherme Toldo	9
18	(Italy) Giorgio Avola	15
31	(France) Erwann Le Péchoux	15
34	(Germany) Moritz Kröplin	3
63	(Venezuela) César Bru	0
2	(China) Ma Jianfei	15

Round of 32
7	(United States) Alexander Massialas	8
26	(France) Vincent Simon	15
42	(Denmark) Alexander Tsoronis	10
10	(Czech Republic) Alexander Choupenitch	15
15	(Japan) Yuki Ota	11
18	(Italy) Giorgio Avola	15
31	(France) Erwann Le Péchoux	13
2	(China) Ma Jianfei	15

Round of 16
26	(France) Vincent Simon	11
10	(Czech Republic) Alexander Choupenitch	15
18	(Italy) Giorgio Avola	7
2	(China) Ma Jianfei	15

Quarterfinals
10	(Czech Republic) Alexander Choupenitch	11
2	(China) Ma Jianfei	15

== Final classification ==
Rank	Athlete	Nation
1st place, gold medalist(s)	Aleksey Cheremisinov	Russia
2nd place, silver medalist(s)	Ma Jianfei	China
3rd place, bronze medalist(s)	Enzo Lefort	France
3rd place, bronze medalist(s)	Timur Safin	Russia
5	Gerek Meinhardt	United States
6	James-Andrew Davis	Great Britain
7	Alexander Choupenitch	Czech Republic
8	Sebastian Bachmann	Germany
9	Race Imboden	United States
10	Dmitry Rigin	Russia
11	Giorgio Avola	Italy
12	Leszek Rajski	Poland
13	Vincent Simon	France
14	Kim Min-kyu	South Korea
15	Song Young-ki	South Korea
16	Alaaeldin Abouelkassem	Egypt
17	Andrea Cassarà	Italy
18	Miles Chamley-Watson	United States
19	Alexander Massialas	United States
20	Peter Joppich	Germany
21	Yuki Ota	Japan
22	Lei Sheng	China
23	Cheung Ka Long	Hong Kong
24	Michał Majewski	Poland
25	Ghislain Perrier	Brazil
26	Volodymyr Koltygo	Ukraine
27	Erwann Le Péchoux	France
28	Rene Pranz	Austria
29	Chen Haiwei	China
30	Alexander Tsoronis	Denmark
31	Tomer Or	Israel
32	Siarhei Byk	Belarus
33	Valerio Aspromonte	Italy
34	Heo Jun	South Korea
35	Andrea Baldini	Italy
36	Cheung Siu Lun	Hong Kong
37	Klod Yunes	Ukraine
38	Richard Kruse	Great Britain
39	Choi Nicholas Edward	Hong Kong
40	Paweł Kawiecki	Poland
41	Bojan Jovanović	Croatia
42	Moritz Kröplin	Germany
43	Yeung Chi Ka	Hong Kong
44	Mario Langer	Austria
45	Aleksey Tishko	Uzbekistan
46	Awaji Suguru	Japan
47	Aliaksandr Chaliankov	Belarus
48	András Németh	Hungary
49	Kim Hyogon	South Korea
50	Guilherme Toldo	Brazil
51	Jhon Pérez	Venezuela
52	Jan Krejčík	Czech Republic
53	Aleksey Khovanskiy	Russia
54	Maor Hatoel	Israel
55	Shi Jialuo	China
56	Marcus Mepstead	Great Britain
57	Johannes Poscharnig	Austria
58	Maximilien Van Haaster	Canada
59	Tarek Ayad	Egypt
60	Brendan Cusack	Ireland
61	Felipe Guillermo Saucedo	Brazil
62	Jesús Beltrán	Mexico
63	César Bru	Venezuela
64	Aliaksandr Lukashevich	Belarus
