= Fencing at the 2016 Summer Olympics – Men's team foil =

Men's team foil at the Games of the XXXI Olympiad
- Venue: Carioca Arena 3
- Date: 12 August 2016
- Competitors: 31 from 8 nations

Medalists
1st place, gold medalist(s)		Aleksey Cheremisinov; Artur Akhmatkhuzin; Timur Safin	Russia
2nd place, silver medalist(s)		Jérémy Cadot; Enzo Lefort; Erwan Le Péchoux; Jean-Paul Tony Helissey	France
3rd place, bronze medalist(s)		Miles Chamley-Watson; Alexander Massialas; Gerek Meinhardt; Race Imboden	United States

The men's team foil competition in fencing at the 2016 Summer Olympics in Rio de Janeiro was held on 12 August at the Carioca Arena 3.

== Schedule ==
All times are Brasília time (UTC−3)

Date	Time	Round
Friday, 12 August 2016	9:00	Quarter-finals
Friday, 12 August 2016	10:30	Placement 5-8
Friday, 12 August 2016	12:00	Semi-finals
Friday, 12 August 2016	13:15	Fifth place
Friday, 12 August 2016	13:15	Seventh place
Friday, 12 August 2016	17:00	Bronze medal match
Friday, 12 August 2016	18:30	Final

== Draw ==
=== Finals ===
Quarter-finals
1	Italy	45
8	Brazil	27
5	China	42
4	France	45
3	Russia	45
6	Great Britain	43
7	Egypt	37
2	United States	45

Semi-finals
1	Italy	30
4	France	45
3	Russia	45
2	United States	41

Finals
4	France	41
3	Russia	45
Third place
1	Italy	31
2	United States	45

=== Classification 5–8 ===
Placement 5–8
8	Brazil	41
5	China	43
6	Great Britain	45
7	Egypt	43

Fifth place
5	China	45
6	Great Britain	38
Seventh place
8	Brazil	39
7	Egypt	45

== Final classification ==
Rank	Team	Athlete
1st place, gold medalist(s)	Russia	Timur Safin; Aleksey Cheremisinov; Artur Akhmatkhuzin
2nd place, silver medalist(s)	France	Enzo Lefort; Jérémy Cadot; Erwann Le Péchoux; Jean-Paul Tony Helissey
3rd place, bronze medalist(s)	United States	Gerek Meinhardt; Alexander Massialas; Miles Chamley-Watson; Race Imboden
4	Italy	Giorgio Avola; Daniele Garozzo; Andrea Baldini; Andrea Cassarà
5	China	Chen Haiwei; Lei Sheng; Ma Jianfei; Shi Jialuo
6	Great Britain	Marcus Mepstead; Laurence Halsted; James-Andrew Davis; Richard Kruse
7	Egypt	Tarek Ayad; Alaaeldin Abouelkassem; Mohamed Essam; Mohamed Hamza
8	Brazil	Henrique Marques; Guilherme Toldo; Ghislain Perrier; Fernando Scavasin
