= Fencing at the 2016 Summer Olympics – Men's foil =

Men's foil at the Games of the XXXI Olympiad
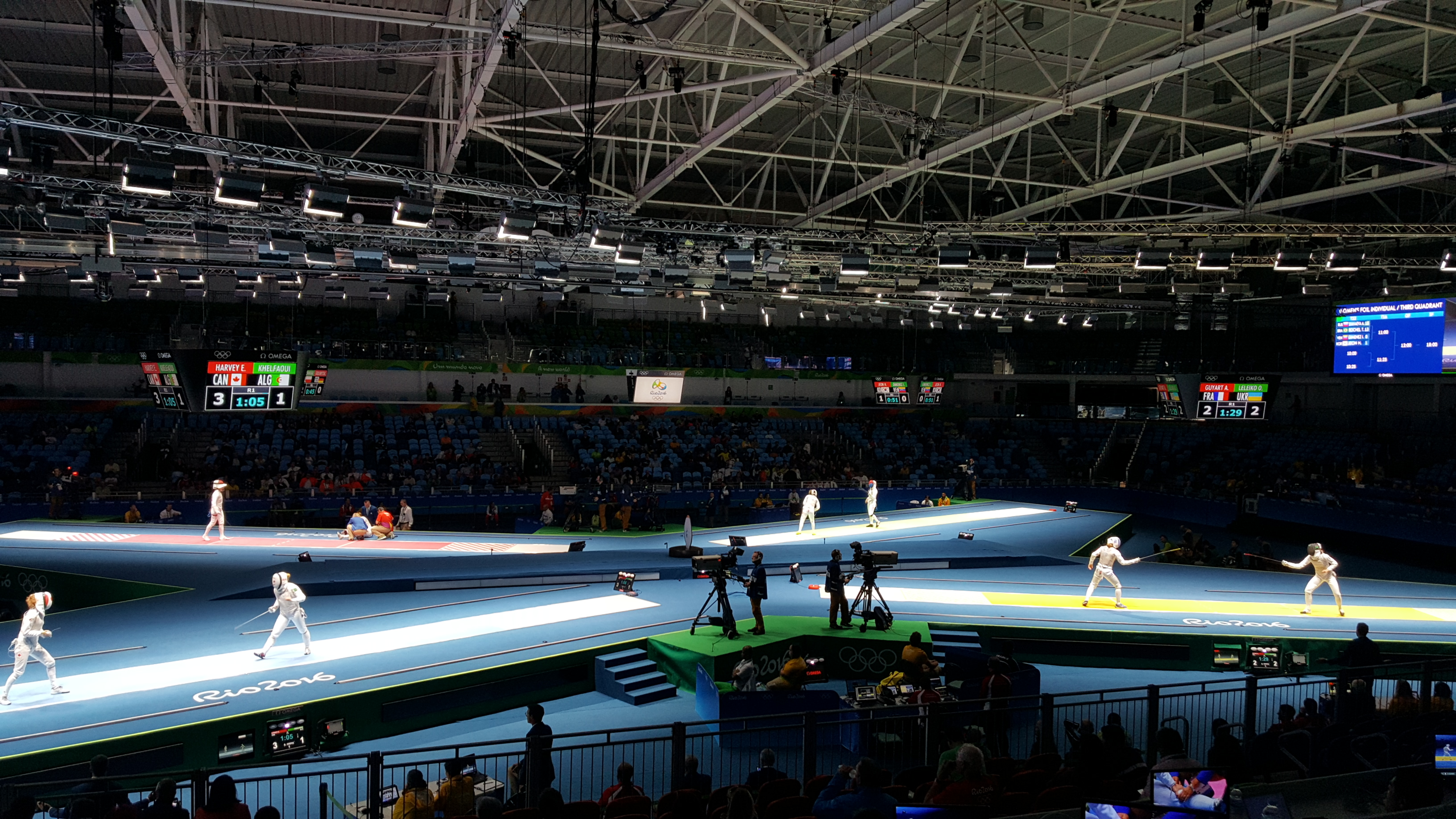
- Fencing at the 2016 Olympics
- Venue: Carioca Arena 3
- Date: 7 August 2016
- Competitors: 35 from 19 nations

Medalists
1st place, gold medalist(s)		Daniele Garozzo	Italy
2nd place, silver medalist(s)		Alexander Massialas	United States
3rd place, bronze medalist(s)		Timur Safin	Russia

The men's foil competition in fencing at the 2016 Summer Olympics in Rio de Janeiro was held on 7 August at the Carioca Arena 3. The medals were presented by Paul Tergat, IOC member, Kenya and Donald Anthony Jr., Executive Board Member of FIE. There were 35 competitors from 19 nations. The event was won by Daniele Garozzo of Italy, the nation's ninth victory in the men's foil (matching France for most all-time) and first since 1996. The silver medalist was American Alexander Massialas, earning the United States' first medal in the event since 1960. Timur Safin of Russia took bronze.

== Background ==
This was the 27th appearance of the event, which has been held at every Summer Olympics except 1908 (when there was a foil display only rather than a medal event). Five of the eight quarterfinalists from 2012 returned: gold medalist Lei Sheng of China, silver medalist Alaaeldin Abouelkassem of Egypt, fifth-place finisher Andrea Cassarà of Italy, seventh-place finisher Ma Jianfei of China, and eighth-place finisher Aleksey Cheremisinov of Russia. 2008 silver medalist, 2012 top-16 finisher, and reigning world champion Yuki Ota of Japan also returned. Cheremisinov had been world champion in 2014, while American Miles Chamley-Watson had taken the title in 2013. The top-ranked fencer going into the Games was another American, Alexander Massialas.

The Czech Republic made its debut in the men's foil. France and the United States each made their 25th appearance, tied for most of any nation; France had missed only the 1904 (with fencers not traveling to St. Louis) and the 1912 (boycotted due to a dispute over rules) foil competitions, while the United States had missed the inaugural 1896 competition and boycotted the 1980 Games altogether.

== Qualification ==
Nations were limited to three fencers each from 1928 to 2004. However, the 2008 Games introduced a rotation of men's team fencing events with one weapon left off each Games; the individual event without a corresponding team event had the number of fencers per nation reduced to two. Men's foil was the first event this applied to, so each nation could enter a maximum of two fencers in the event in 2008. The team foil was back in 2016 (sabre the missing weapon for men), so the limit was three for 2016.

There were 35 dedicated quota spots for men's foil. The first 24 spots went to the 3 members of each of the 8 qualified teams in the team foil event. Next, 7 more men were selected from the world rankings based on continents: 2 from Europe, 2 from the Americas, 2 from Asia/Oceania, and 1 from Africa. Finally, 4 spots were allocated by continental qualifying events: 1 from Europe, 1 from the Americas, 1 from Asia/Oceania, and 1 from Africa.

Additionally, there were 8 host/invitational spots that could be spread throughout the various fencing events. Brazil had already qualified a men's foil team (with the corresponding three places in individual foil), so used no spots in the individual men's foil.

== Competition format ==
The 1996 tournament had vastly simplified the competition format into a single-elimination bracket, with a bronze medal match. The 2016 tournament continued to use that format. Fencing was done to 15 touches or to the completion of three three-minute rounds if neither fencer reached 15 touches by then. At the end of time, the higher-scoring fencer was the winner; a tie resulted in an additional one-minute sudden-death time period. This sudden-death period was further modified by the selection of a draw-winner beforehand; if neither fencer scored a touch during the minute, the predetermined draw-winner won the bout. Standard foil rules regarding target area, striking, and priority were used.

== Schedule ==
All times are Brasília Time (UTC-03:00)

Date	Time	Round
Sunday, 7 August 2016		Round of 64; Round of 32; Round of 16; Quarterfinals; Semifinals; Bronze medal match Final

== Results ==
=== Section 1 ===
Round of 64
Guilherme Toldo (BRA)	15
René Pranz (AUT)	14

Round of 32
Yuki Ota (JPN)	13
Guilherme Toldo (BRA)	15
Cheung Ka Long (HKG)	15
Heo Jun (KOR)	8
Daniele Garozzo (ITA)	15
Tarek Ayad (EGY)	8
Alexander Choupenitch (CZE)	8
Alaaeldin Abouelkassem (EGY)	15

Round of 16
Guilherme Toldo (BRA)	15
Cheung Ka Long (HKG)	10
Daniele Garozzo (ITA)	15
Alaaeldin Abouelkassem (EGY)	13

Quarter-finals
Guilherme Toldo (BRA)	8
Daniele Garozzo (ITA)	15

=== Section 2 ===
Round of 64

Round of 32
James Davis (GBR)	15
Mohamed Ayoub Ferjani (TUN)	7
Aleksey Cheremisinov (RUS)	10
Timur Safin (RUS)	15
Chen Haiwei (CHN)	15
Laurence Halsted (GBR)	9
Ghislain Perrier (BRA)	14
Ma Jianfei (CHN)	15

Round of 16
James Davis (GBR)	13
Timur Safin (RUS)	15
Chen Haiwei (CHN)	15
Ma Jianfei (CHN)	12

Quarter-finals
Timur Safin (RUS)	15
Chen Haiwei (CHN)	7

=== Section 3 ===
Round of 64
Antonio Leal (VEN)	7
Maximilien van Haaster (CAN)	15

Round of 32
Gerek Meinhardt (USA)	15
Maximilien van Haaster (CAN)	4
Lei Sheng (CHN)	9
Erwann Le Péchoux (FRA)	15
Jérémy Cadot (FRA)	14
Andrea Cassarà (ITA)	15
Hamid Sintès (ALG)	4
Richard Kruse (GBR)	15

Round of 16
Gerek Meinhardt (USA)	15
Erwann Le Péchoux (FRA)	14
Andrea Cassarà (ITA)	12
Richard Kruse (GBR)	15

Quarter-finals
Gerek Meinhardt (USA)	13
Richard Kruse (GBR)	15

=== Section 4 ===
Round of 64
Mohamed Essam (EGY)	15
Henrique Marques (BRA)	8

Round of 32
Giorgio Avola (ITA)	15
Daniel Gómez (MEX)	5
Enzo Lefort (FRA)	13
Peter Joppich (GER)	15
Miles Chamley-Watson (USA)	13
Artur Akhmatkhuzin (RUS)	15
Mohamed Essam (EGY)	7
Alexander Massialas (USA)	15

Round of 16
Giorgio Avola (ITA)	15
Peter Joppich (GER)	13
Artur Akhmatkhuzin (RUS)	9
Alexander Massialas (USA)	15

Quarter-finals
Giorgio Avola (ITA)	14
Alexander Massialas (USA)	15

=== Finals ===
Semi-finals
Daniele Garozzo (ITA)	15
Timur Safin (RUS)	8
Richard Kruse (GBR)	9
Alexander Massialas (USA)	15

Final
Daniele Garozzo (ITA)	15
Alexander Massialas (USA)	11
Bronze medal match
Timur Safin (RUS)	15
Richard Kruse (GBR)	13

== Final classification ==
Rank	Fencer	Nation
1st place, gold medalist(s)	Daniele Garozzo	Italy
2nd place, silver medalist(s)	Alexander Massialas	United States
3rd place, bronze medalist(s)	Timur Safin	Russia
4	Richard Kruse	Great Britain
5	Gerek Meinhardt	United States
6	Giorgio Avola	Italy
7	Chen Haiwei	China
8	Guilherme Toldo	Brazil
9	Ma Jianfei	China
10	James Davis	Great Britain
11	Alaaeldin Abouelkassem	Egypt
12	Peter Joppich	Germany
13	Erwann Le Péchoux	France
14	Cheung Ka Long	Hong Kong
15	Artur Akhmatkhuzin	Russia
16	Andrea Cassara	Italy
17	Yuki Ota	Japan
18	Jeremy Cadot	France
19	Miles Chamley-Watson	United States
20	Heo Jun	South Korea
21	Lei Sheng	China
22	Laurence Halsted	Great Britain
23	Alexey Cheremisinov	Russia
24	Enzo Lefort	France
25	Tarek Ayad	Egypt
26	Alexander Choupenitch	Czech Republic
27	Daniel Gómez	Mexico
28	Hamid Sintès	Algeria
29	Mohamed Ayoub Ferjani	Tunisia
30	Ghislain Perrier	Brazil
31	Maximilien van Haaster	Canada
32	Mohamed Essam	Egypt
33	Rene Pranz	Austria
34	Henrique Marques	Brazil
35	Antonio Leal	Venezuela
