= 2017 European Fencing Championships =

- Host city: (Georgia (country)) Tbilisi
- Dates: 12–17 June 2017
- Main venue: Tbilisi Gymnastic Arena
- Website: www.euchamp2017.geofencing.ge

The 2017 European Fencing Championships were held in Tbilisi, Georgia from 12 to 17 June 2017 at the Tbilisi Gymnastic Arena.

== Schedule ==
●	Opening Ceremony	●	Finals	●	Closing Ceremony

June	12	13	14	15	16	17	Total
Ceremonies	●					●	
Foil Individual	Men	Women					2
Épée Individual		Men		Women			2
Sabre Individual	Women			Men			2
Foil Team			Men		Women		2
Épée Team					Men	Women	2
Sabre Team			Women			Men	2
Total Gold Medals	2	2	2	2	2	2	12

== Medal summary ==
=== Men's events ===
Event	Gold	Silver	Bronze
Foil	Daniele Garozzo (ITA)	Timur Safin (RUS)	Giorgio Avola (ITA)
Foil	Daniele Garozzo (ITA)	Timur Safin (RUS)	Jérémy Cadot (FRA)
Épée	Yannick Borel (FRA)	Paolo Pizzo (ITA)	Sergey Khodos (RUS)
Épée	Yannick Borel (FRA)	Paolo Pizzo (ITA)	Nikolai Novosjolov (EST)
Sabre	Max Hartung (GER)	Áron Szilágyi (HUN)	Luca Curatoli (ITA)
Sabre	Max Hartung (GER)	Áron Szilágyi (HUN)	Sandro Bazadze (GEO)
Team Foil	France; Erwann Le Péchoux; Jérémy Cadot; Julien Mertine; Enzo Lefort	Russia; Aleksey Cheremisinov; Timur Safin; Timur Arslanov; Dmitry Zherebchenko	Italy; Daniele Garozzo; Giorgio Avola; Lorenzo Nista; Alessio Foconi
Team Épée	Russia; Sergey Bida; Sergey Khodos; Pavel Sukhov; Nikita Glazkov	Ukraine; Anatoliy Herey; Maksym Khvorost; Bohdan Nikishyn; Volodymyr Stankevych	Czech Republic; Jiří Beran; Pavel Pitra; Richard Pokorny; Martin Rubeš
Team Sabre	Russia; Kamil Ibragimov; Aleksey Yakimenko; Vladislav Pozdnyakov; Dmitry Danilenko	Italy; Luigi Samele; Aldo Montano; Luca Curatoli; Enrico Berrè	Hungary; Áron Szilágyi; András Szatmári; Csanád Gémesi; Tamás Decsi

=== Women's events ===
Event	Gold	Silver	Bronze
Foil	Arianna Errigo (ITA)	Inna Deriglazova (RUS)	Alice Volpi (ITA)
Foil	Arianna Errigo (ITA)	Inna Deriglazova (RUS)	Ysaora Thibus (FRA)
Épée	Violetta Kolobova (RUS)	Alexandra Ndolo (GER)	Julia Beljajeva (EST)
Épée	Violetta Kolobova (RUS)	Alexandra Ndolo (GER)	Emese Szász-Kovács (HUN)
Sabre	Teodora Kakhiani (GEO)	Rossella Gregorio (ITA)	Liza Pusztai (HUN)
Sabre	Teodora Kakhiani (GEO)	Rossella Gregorio (ITA)	Bianca Pascu (ROU)
Team Foil	Italy; Martina Batini; Arianna Errigo; Alice Volpi; Camilla Mancini	Russia; Adelina Zagidullina; Inna Deriglazova; Svetlana Tripapina; Marta Martyanova	Germany; Carolin Golubytskyi; Anne Sauer; Eva Hampel; Leonie Ebert
Team Épée	France; Auriane Mallo; Lauren Rembi; Melissa Goram; Coraline Vitalis	Russia; Yana Zvereva; Tatyana Gudkova; Violetta Kolobova; Daria Martynyuk	Romania; Amalia Tătăran; Adela Danciu; Raluca Sbîrcia; Greta Vereș
Team Sabre	Italy; Rossella Gregorio; Loreta Gulotta; Irene Vecchi; Martina Criscio	Russia; Yana Egorian; Anna Bashta; Anastasia Bazhenova; Sofia Pozdniakova	France; Cécilia Berder; Manon Brunet; Charlotte Lembach; Sara Balzer

== Medal table ==
Rank	Nation	Gold	Silver	Bronze	Total
1	Italy (ITA)	4	3	4	11
2	Russia (RUS)	3	6	1	10
3	France (FRA)	3	0	3	6
4	Germany (GER)	1	1	1	3
5	Georgia (GEO)	1	0	1	2
6	Hungary (HUN)	0	1	3	4
7	Ukraine (UKR)	0	1	0	1
8	Estonia (EST)	0	0	2	2
8	Romania (ROU)	0	0	2	2
10	Czech Republic (CZE)	0	0	1	1
Totals (10 entries)		12	12	18	42

== Results ==
=== Men ===
==== Foil individual ====
Position	Name	Country
1st place, gold medalist(s)	Daniele Garozzo	Italy
2nd place, silver medalist(s)	Timur Safin	Russia
3rd place, bronze medalist(s)	Giorgio Avola	Italy
3rd place, bronze medalist(s)	Jeremy Cadot	France
5.	Richard Kruse	Great Britain
6.	James-Andrew Davis	Great Britain
7.	Alexander Choupenitch	Czech Republic
8.	Peter Joppich	Germany

Quarter-finals
(United Kingdom) Richard Kruse	11
(Italy) Giorgio Avola	15
(United Kingdom) James-Andrew Davis	12
(Italy) Daniele Garozzo	15
(Russia) Timur Safin	15
(Czech Republic) Alexander Choupenitch	14
(France) Jeremy Cadot	15
(Germany) Peter Joppich	2

Semi-finals
(Italy) Giorgio Avola	9
(Italy) Daniele Garozzo	15
(Russia) Timur Safin	15
(France) Jeremy Cadot	7

Final
(Italy) Daniele Garozzo	15
(Russia) Timur Safin	12

==== Épée individual ====
Position	Name	Country
1st place, gold medalist(s)	Yannick Borel	France
2nd place, silver medalist(s)	Paolo Pizzo	Italy
3rd place, bronze medalist(s)	Sergey Khodos	Russia
3rd place, bronze medalist(s)	Nikolai Novosjolov	Estonia
5.	Jiri Beran	Czech Republic
6.	Pavel Sukhov	Russia
7.	Daniel Jérent	France
8.	Michele Niggeler	Switzerland

Quarter-finals
(Russia) Sergey Khodos	15
(Czech Republic) Jiri Beran	9
(Russia) Pavel Sukhov	9
(Italy) Paolo Pizzo	13
(France) Daniel Jerent	14
(Estonia) Nikolai Novosjolov	15
(France) Yannick Borel	15
(Switzerland) Michele Niggeler	9

Semi-finals
(Russia) Sergey Khodos	10
(Italy) Paolo Pizzo	15
(Estonia) Nikolai Novosjolov	10
(France) Yannick Borel	15

Final
(Italy) Paolo Pizzo	10
(France) Yannick Borel	15

==== Sabre individual ====
Position	Name	Country
1st place, gold medalist(s)	Max Hartung	Germany
2nd place, silver medalist(s)	Áron Szilágyi	Hungary
3rd place, bronze medalist(s)	Luca Curatoli	Italy
3rd place, bronze medalist(s)	Sandro Bazadze	Georgia
5.	Andriy Yahodka	Ukraine
6.	Benedikt Wagner	Germany
7.	Csanád Gémesi	Hungary
8.	Tamás Decsi	Hungary

Quarter-finals
(Ukraine) Andriy Yahodka	10
(Italy) Luca Curatoli	15
(Hungary) Áron Szilágyi	15
(Germany) Benedikt Wagner	8
(Georgia (country)) Sandro Bazadze	15
(Hungary) Csanád Gémesi	7
(Germany) Max Hartung	15
(Hungary) Tamás Decsi	4

Semi-finals
(Italy) Luca Curatoli	10
(Hungary) Áron Szilágyi	15
(Georgia (country)) Sandro Bazadze	11
(Germany) Max Hartung	15

Final
(Hungary) Áron Szilágyi	7
(Germany) Max Hartung	15

==== Foil team ====
Position	Name	Country
1st place, gold medalist(s)	Erwann Le Péchoux; Jérémy Cadot; Julien Mertine; Enzo Lefort	France
2nd place, silver medalist(s)	Aleksey Cheremisinov; Timur Safin; Timur Arslanov; Dmitry Zherebchenko	Russia
3rd place, bronze medalist(s)	Daniele Garozzo; Giorgio Avola; Lorenzo Nista; Alessio Foconi	Italy
4.	Benjamin Kleibrink; Peter Joppich; Alexander Kahl; André Sanità	Germany
5.	Leszek Rajski; Michał Siess; Piotr Janda; Andrzej Rządkowski	Poland
6.	Richard Kruse; James-Andrew Davis; Marcus Mepstead; Kamal Minott	Great Britain
7.	Andriy Pohrebnyak; Rostyslav Hertsyk; Klod Yunes; Dmytro Chuchukalo	Ukraine
8.	Tevfik Burak Babaoğlu; Martino Minuto; Engin Batuhan Menküer; Muhammed Ege Coşgun	Turkey

Quarter-finals
France	45
Poland	30
Germany	45
Great Britain	39
Italy	45
Ukraine	39
Turkey	13
Russia	45

Semi-finals
France	45
Germany	26
Italy	40
Russia	45

Final
France	45
Russia	43
Third place
Germany	40
Italy	45

==== Épée team ====
Position	Name	Country
1st place, gold medalist(s)	Vadim Anokhin; Sergey Khodos; Pavel Sukhov; Nikita Glazkov	Russia
2nd place, silver medalist(s)	Anatoliy Herey; Maksym Khvorost; Bohdan Nikishyn; Volodymyr Stankevych	Ukraine
3rd place, bronze medalist(s)	Jiří Beran; Pavel Pitra; Richard Pokorny; Martin Rubeš	Czech Republic
4.	Lukas Bellmann; Fabian Herzberg; Richard Schmidt; Raphael Steinberger	Germany
5.	András Rédli; Péter Somfai; Zsombor Bányai; Gergely Siklósi	Hungary
6.	Yannick Borel; Ronan Gustin; Daniel Jérent; Jean-Michel Lucenay	France
7.	Marco Fichera; Enrico Garozzo; Paolo Pizzo; Andrea Santarelli	Italy
8.	Max Heinzer; Benjamin Steffen; Georg Kuhn; Michele Niggeler	Switzerland

Quarter-finals
France	43
Germany	45
Switzerland	34
Russia	45
Ukraine	45
Hungary	39
Czech Republic	37
Italy	32

Semi-finals
Germany	30
Russia	41
Ukraine	18
Czech Republic	14

Final
Russia	33
Ukraine	32
Third place
Germany	22
Czech Republic	23

==== Sabre team ====
Position	Name	Country
1st place, gold medalist(s)	Kamil Ibragimov; Aleksey Yakimenko; Vladislav Pozdnyakov; Dmitry Danilenko	Russia
2nd place, silver medalist(s)	Luigi Samele; Aldo Montano; Luca Curatoli; Enrico Berrè	Italy
3rd place, bronze medalist(s)	Áron Szilágyi; András Szatmári; Csanád Gémesi; Tamás Decsi	Hungary
4.	Benedikt Wagner; Matyas Szabo; Björn Hübner; Max Hartung	Germany
5.	Andriy Yahodka; Dmytro Pundyk; Oleksiy Statsenko; Bogdan Platonov	Ukraine
6.	Iulian Teodosiu; Tiberiu Dolniceanu; Alin Badea; George Iancu	Romania
7.	Boladé Apithy; Vincent Anstett; Tom Seitz; Charles Colleau	France
8.	Sandro Bazadze; Saba Sulamanidze; Nika Shengelia; Beka Bazadze	Georgia

Quarter-finals
Italy	45
Georgia	37
Germany	45
Romania	39
Hungary	45
France	41
Ukraine	29
Russia	45

Semi-finals
Italy	45
Germany	39
Hungary	39
Russia	45

Final
Italy	41
Russia	45
Third place
Germany	28
Hungary	45

=== Women ===
==== Foil individual ====
Position	Name	Country
1st place, gold medalist(s)	Arianna Errigo	Italy
2nd place, silver medalist(s)	Inna Deriglazova	Russia
3rd place, bronze medalist(s)	Alice Volpi	Italy
3rd place, bronze medalist(s)	Ysaora Thibus	France
5.	Martina Batini	Italy
6.	Leonie Ebert	Germany
7.	Fanny Kreiss	Hungary
8.	Pauline Ranvier	France

Quarter-finals
(Russia) Inna Deriglazova	16
(Italy) Martina Batini	13
(Germany) Leonie Ebert	7
(Italy) Alice Volpi	15
(Hungary) Fanny Kreiss	9
(France) Ysaora Thibus	15
(France) Pauline Ranvier	10
(Italy) Arianna Errigo	15

Semi-finals
(Russia) Inna Deriglazova	15
(Italy) Alice Volpi	9
(France) Ysaora Thibus	9
(Italy) Arianna Errigo	15

Final
(Russia) Inna Deriglazova	14
(Italy) Arianna Errigo	15

==== Épée individual ====
Position	Name	Country
1st place, gold medalist(s)	Violetta Kolobova	Russia
2nd place, silver medalist(s)	Alexandra Ndolo	Germany
3rd place, bronze medalist(s)	Julia Beljajeva	Estonia
3rd place, bronze medalist(s)	Emese Szász-Kovács	Hungary
5.	Ana London	Israel
6.	Ewa Nelip	Poland
7.	Olena Kryvytska	Ukraine
8.	Lis Fautsch	Luxembourg

Quarter-finals
(Estonia) Julia Beljajeva	15
(Israel) Ana London	8
(Germany) Alexandra Ndolo	15
(Poland) Ewa Nelip	11
(Hungary) Emese Szász-Kovács	15
(Ukraine) Olena Kryvytska	12
(Luxembourg) Lis Fautsch	7
(Russia) Violetta Kolobova	15

Semi-finals
(Estonia) Julia Beljajeva	12
(Germany) Alexandra Ndolo	15
(Hungary) Emese Szász-Kovács	13
(Russia) Violetta Kolobova	15

Final
(Germany) Alexandra Ndolo	10
(Russia) Violetta Kolobova	15

==== Sabre individual ====
Position	Name	Country
1st place, gold medalist(s)	Teodora Kakhiani	Georgia
2nd place, silver medalist(s)	Rossella Gregorio	Italy
3rd place, bronze medalist(s)	Liza Pusztai	Hungary
3rd place, bronze medalist(s)	Bianca Pascu	Romania
5.	Anna Limbach	Germany
6.	Loreta Gulotta	Italy
7.	Sofia Pozdniakova	Russia
8.	Cécilia Berder	France

Quarter-finals
(Hungary) Liza Pusztai	15
(Germany) Anna Limbach	12
(Georgia (country)) Teodora Kakhiani	15
(Italy) Loreta Gulotta	13
(Russia) Sofia Pozdniakova	12
(Italy) Rossella Gregorio	15
(Romania) Bianca Pascu	15
(France) Cécilia Berder	8

Semi-finals
(Hungary) Liza Pusztai	12
(Georgia (country)) Teodora Kakhiani	15
(Italy) Rossella Gregorio	15
(Romania) Bianca Pascu	10

Final
(Georgia (country)) Teodora Kakhiani	15
(Italy) Rossella Gregorio	8

==== Foil team ====
Position	Name	Country
1st place, gold medalist(s)	Martina Batini; Arianna Errigo; Alice Volpi; Camilla Mancini	Italy
2nd place, silver medalist(s)	Adelina Zagidullina; Inna Deriglazova; Svetlana Tripapina; Marta Martyanova	Russia
3rd place, bronze medalist(s)	Carolin Golubytskyi; Anne Sauer; Eva Hampel; Leonie Ebert	Germany
4.	Aida Mohamed; Edina Knapek; Fanny Kreiss; Dóra Lupkovics	Hungary
5.	Ysaora Thibus; Astrid Guyart; Anita Blaze; Pauline Ranvier	France
6.	Hanna Łyczbińska; Marta Łyczbińska; Martyna Jelińska; Julia Walczyk	Poland
7.	Cristina Valero-Collantes; Ester Schreiber; Patricia Gilljam; Harriet Rundquist	Sweden

Quarter-finals
Italy
-
Poland	39
Germany	43
France	36
Hungary	37
Sweden	18
Russia	45

Semi-finals
Italy	45
Germany	36
Hungary	27
Russia	45

Final
Italy	45
Russia	31
Third place
Germany	45
Hungary	18

==== Épée team ====
Position	Name	Country
1st place, gold medalist(s)	Auriane Mallo; Lauren Rembi; Melissa Goram; Coraline Vitalis	France
2nd place, silver medalist(s)	Yana Zvereva; Tatyana Gudkova; Violetta Kolobova; Daria Martynyuk	Russia
3rd place, bronze medalist(s)	Amalia Tataran; Adela Danciu; Raluca Cristina Sbarcia; Greta Vereș	Romania
4.	Julia Beljajeva; Irina Embrich; Erika Kirpu; Kristina Kuusk	Estonia
5.	Renata Knapik-Miazga; Magdalena Piekarska; Ewa Nelip; Barbara Rutz	Poland
6.	Monika Sozanska; Beate Christmann; Alexandra Ehler; Alexandra Ndolo	Germany
7.	Olena Kryvytska; Kseniya Pantelyeyeva; Anfisa Pochkalova; Dzhoan Feybi Bezhura	Ukraine
8.	Rossella Fiamingo; Mara Navarria; Giulia Rizzi; Alberta Santuccio	Italy

Quarter-finals
Estonia	34
Poland	26
Italy	42
France	45
Ukraine	40
Romania	44
Germany	33
Russia	43

Semi-finals
Estonia	35
France	45
Romania	41
Russia	45

Final
France	42
Russia	41
Third place
Estonia	38
Romania	45

==== Sabre team ====
Position	Name	Country
1st place, gold medalist(s)	Rossella Gregorio; Loreta Gulotta; Irene Vecchi; Martina Criscio	Italy
2nd place, silver medalist(s)	Yana Egorian; Anna Bashta; Anastasia Bazhenova; Sofia Pozdniakova	Russia
3rd place, bronze medalist(s)	Cécilia Berder; Manon Brunet; Charlotte Lembach; Sara Balzer	France
4.	Anna Márton; Renáta Katona; Liza Pusztai; Petra Záhonyi	Hungary
5.	Olha Kharlan; Olha Zhovnir; Yuliya Bakastova; Olena Prokuda	Ukraine
6.	Sandra Marcos; Lucia Martin-Portugues; Celia Perez-Cuenca; Laia Vila	Spain
7.	Malgorzata Kozaczuk; Marta Puda; Katarzyna Kędziora; Martyna Komisarczyk	Poland
8.	Anna Limbach; Ann-Sophie Kindler; Lea Krueger; Judith Kusian	Germany

Quarter-finals
Russia	45
Germany	41
Hungary	45
Ukraine	43
France	45
Poland	36
Spain	36
Italy	45

Semi-finals
Russia	45
Hungary	25
France	39
Italy	45

Final
Russia	44
Italy	45
Third place
Hungary	36
France	45
