= Kim Min-kyu (fencer) =

South Korean fencer

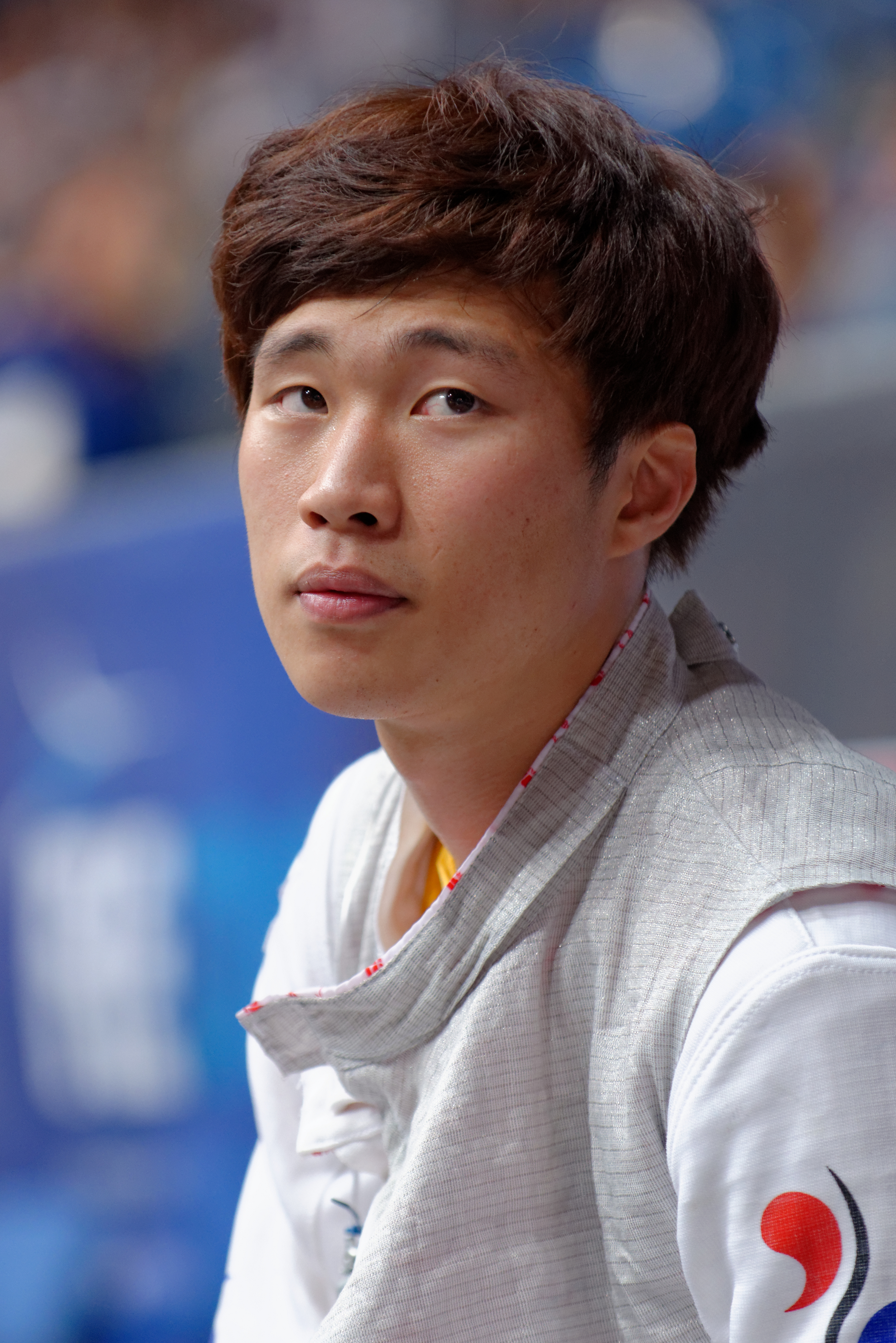
- Kim at the 2013 World Fencing Championships

Personal information
- Born: 19 June 1990 (age 36)

Fencing career
- Sport: Fencing
- Weapon: foil
- Hand: left-handed
- National coach: Go Jin
- Club: Armed Forces Sports
- FIE ranking: current ranking
Medal record
Men's foil
Representing South Korea
Asian Championships
Gold medal – first place	2013 Shanghai	Team Foil
Silver medal – second place	2014 Suwon	Team Foil
Bronze medal – third place	2013 Shanghai	Individual

- Kim Min-kyu
- Hangul: 김민규
- RR: Gim Mingyu
- MR: Kim Min'gyu

Kim Min-kyu (Korean: 김민규; born 19 June 1990) is a South Korean foil fencer, bronze medallist in the individual event and gold medallist in the team event at the 2013 Asian Fencing Championships.

He reached the table of 16 at the 2014 World Fencing Championships before being defeated by Russia's Timur Safin, who eventually took the bronze medal.
