= Enzo Lefort =

French foil fencer

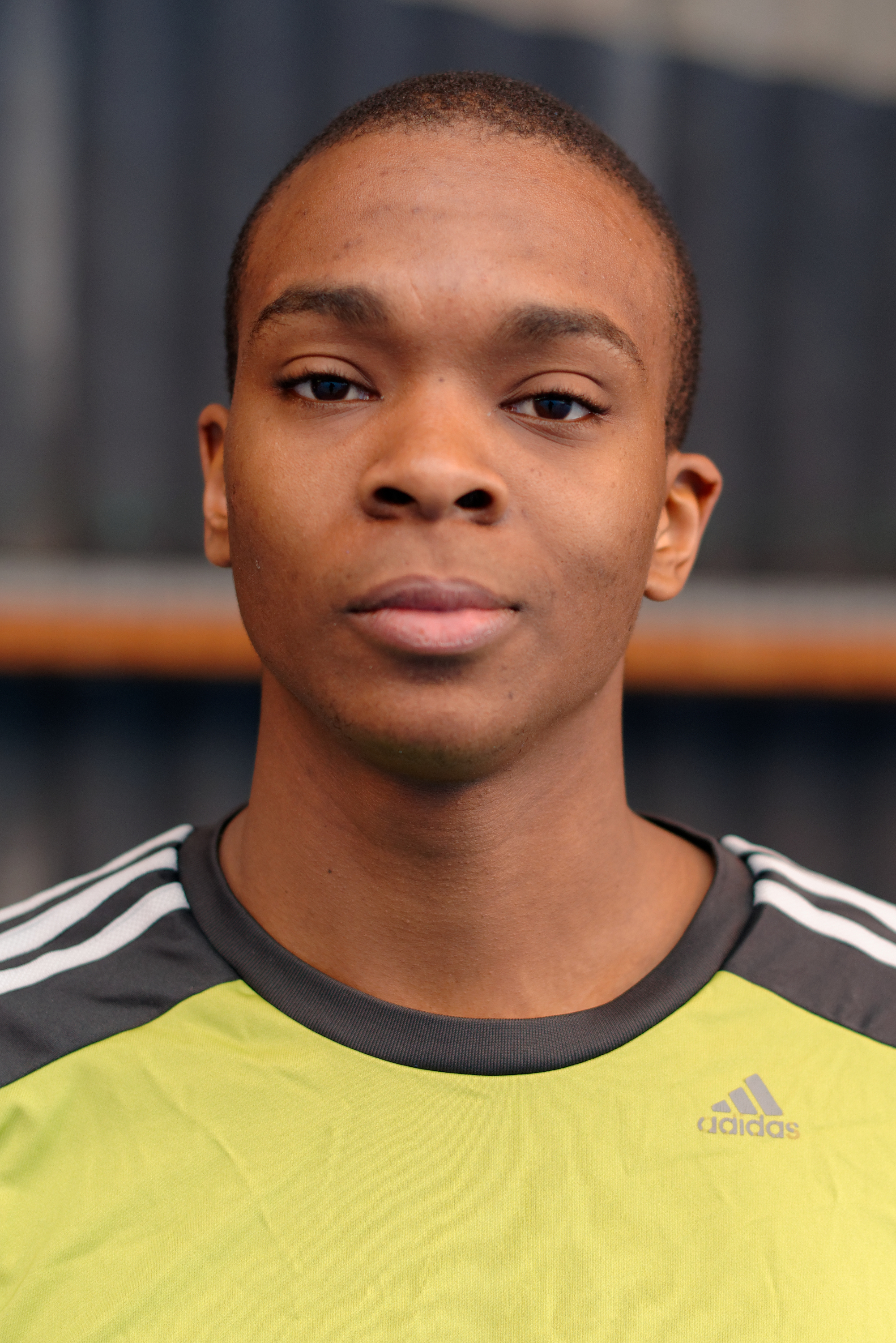
- Lefort at the Challenge Revenu 2013

Personal information
- Full name: Enzo Boris Lefort
- Born: 29 September 1991 (age 35) Cayenne, Guiana, France
- Height: 1.90 m (6 ft 3 in)
- Weight: 75 kg (165 lb)

Fencing career
- Sport: Fencing
- Country: France
- Weapon: Foil
- Hand: Right-handed
- Club: Club d'escrime Melun Val-de-Seine / INSEP
- FIE ranking: current ranking
Medal record
Men's foil
Representing France
Olympic Games
Gold medal – first place	2020 Tokyo	Team
Silver medal – second place	2016 Rio de Janeiro	Team
Bronze medal – third place	2024 Paris	Team
World Championships
Gold medal – first place	2014 Kazan	Team
Gold medal – first place	2019 Budapest	Individual
Gold medal – first place	2022 Cairo	Individual
Silver medal – second place	2019 Budapest	Team
Bronze medal – third place	2013 Budapest	Team
Bronze medal – third place	2014 Kazan	Individual
Bronze medal – third place	2017 Leipzig	Team
Bronze medal – third place	2022 Cairo	Team
Bronze medal – third place	2023 Milan	Individual
European Games
Silver medal – second place	2023 Kraków–Małopolska	Team
European Championships
Gold medal – first place	2014 Strasbourg	Team
Gold medal – first place	2015 Montreux	Team
Gold medal – first place	2017 Tbilisi	Team
Gold medal – first place	2019 Düsseldorf	Team
Gold medal – first place	2024 Basel	Team
Silver medal – second place	2012 Legnano	Team
Silver medal – second place	2023 Plovdiv	Individual
Silver medal – second place	2023 Kraków	Team
Bronze medal – third place	2019 Düsseldorf	Individual

Enzo Lefort (French: [ɛnzo ləfɔʁ]; born 29 September 1991) is a French right-handed foil fencer.

Lefort is a four-time team European champion, 2014 team world champion, and two-time individual world champion.

A three-time Olympian, Lefort is a 2016 team Olympic silver medalist and 2021 team Olympic champion.

Lefort competed in the 2012 London Olympic Games, the 2016 Rio de Janeiro Olympic Games, and the 2020 Tokyo Olympic Games.

== Career ==
Lefort was born in French Guiana. He discovered fencing when he was five, while watching fellow French Caribbean Laura Flessel win the gold medal in the 1996 Summer Olympics at Atlanta. He began fencing at CREPS in Les Abymes, Guadeloupe, where he trained under Ruddy Plicoste along with Jean-Paul Tony Helissey and Ysaora Thibus. He later joined the centre for promising athletes in Châtenay-Malabry in metropolitan France.

Lefort won the French national championship in 2012. At the 2012 Summer Olympics he competed in the Men's foil, but was defeated in the second round. In the team event, France were defeated 39–45 against the United States in the quarter-finals. After the fencing section of the Lagardère Paris Racing was dissolved, Lefort joined the Cercle d'Escrime Melun Val de Seine.

In the 2013–14 season Lefort won the Challenge International de Paris, his first World Cup medal, and climbed the podium in Venice, Saint-Petersburg and Havana. In the European Championships at Strasbourg, Lefort was defeated in the second round by Denmark's Emil Ulrik Andersen. In the team event, France received a bye, then overcame the Czech Republic and Russia to meet Italy in the final. They prevailed 45–41 to earn the gold medal. A month later in the World Championships at Kazan, Lefort was seeded number two. He made his way to the quarter-finals, where he defeated reigning European champion James-Andrew Davis, but was defeated in the semi-final by Aleksey Cheremisinov of Russia and came away with a bronze medal. In the team event, No.2 seeded France received a bye, then knocked out Hong Kong, Germany and hosts Russia to meet China in the Final. They beat China 45–25 to earn the gold medal. Lefort finished the season No.2 in FIE rankings.

At the 2016 Summer Olympics, Lefort competed in the Men's foil, being eliminated in the round of 32. In the team event, France were defeated 41–45 by Russia in the finals to earn a silver medal.

In 2017, he was the flag bearer for France at the World Military Championships.

At the 2019 World Championships in Budapest, he won gold in the individual men's foil. That year, he also won bronze in the European Championships.

=== National Honours ===
He was named a Knight of the National Order of Merit in 2016, and a Knight of the National Order of the Legion of Honour in 2021.

== Medal record ==
=== Olympic Games ===
Year	Location	Event	Position
2016	Rio de Janeiro, Brazil	Team Men's Foil	2nd
2021	Tokyo, Japan	Team Men's Foil	1st
2024	Paris, France	Team Men's Foil	3rd

=== World Championship ===
Year	Location	Event	Position
2013	Budapest, Hungary	Team Men's Foil	3rd
2014	Kazan, Russia	Individual Men's Foil	3rd
2014	Kazan, Russia	Team Men's Foil	1st
2017	Leipzig, Germany	Team Men's Foil	3rd
2019	Budapest, Hungary	Individual Men's Foil	1st
2019	Budapest, Hungary	Team Men's Foil	2nd
2022	Cairo, Egypt	Individual Men's Foil	1st
2022	Cairo, Egypt	Team Men's Foil	3rd

=== European Championship ===
Year	Location	Event	Position
2012	Legnano, Italy	Team Men's Foil	2nd
2014	Strasbourg, France	Team Men's Foil	1st
2015	Montreux, Switzerland	Team Men's Foil	1st
2017	(Georgia (country)) Tbilisi, Georgia	Team Men's Foil	1st
2019	Düsseldorf, Germany	Individual Men's Foil	3rd
2019	Düsseldorf, Germany	Team Men's Foil	1st

=== Grand Prix ===
Date	Location	Event	Position
2014-03-01	St. Petersburg, Russia	Individual Men's Foil	2nd
2014-03-15	Venice, Italy	Individual Men's Foil	2nd
2016-12-02	Turin, Italy	Individual Men's Foil	3rd
2017-12-01	Turin, Italy	Individual Men's Foil	3rd

=== World Cup ===
Date	Location	Event	Position
2014-01-17	Paris, France	Individual Men's Foil	1st
2014-05-23	Havana, Cuba	Individual Men's Foil	3rd
2014-11-07	Tokyo, Japan	Individual Men's Foil	3rd
2015-01-16	Paris, France	Individual Men's Foil	3rd
2017-02-10	Bonn, Germany	Individual Men's Foil	2nd
2018-11-09	Bonn, Germany	Individual Men's Foil	3rd
2020-01-10	Paris, France	Individual Men's Foil	3rd
