= Ghislain Perrier =

French-Brazilian fencer

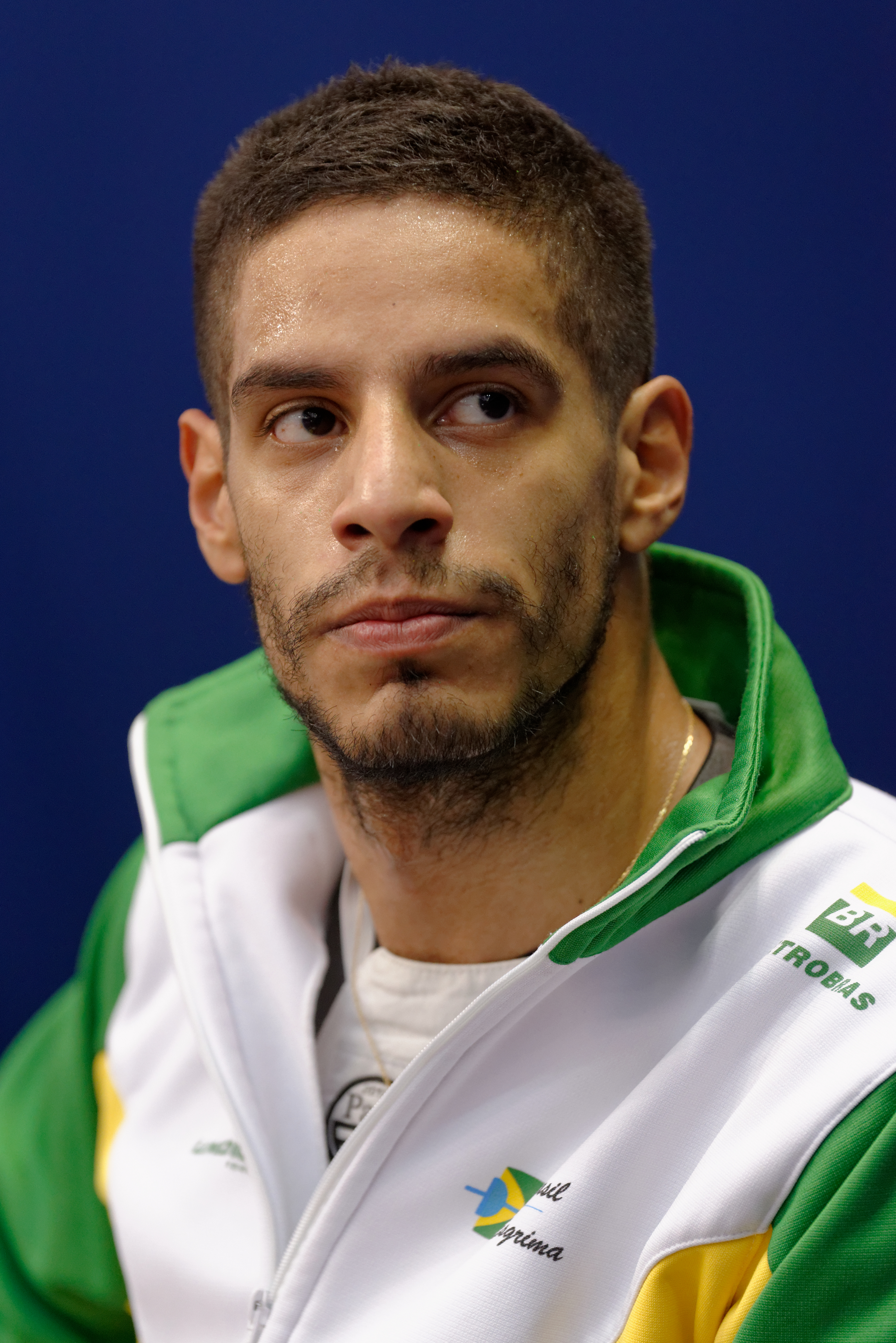

Personal information
- Born: 17 May 1987 (age 39) Fortaleza, Ceará, Brazil
- Height: 1.88 m (6 ft 2 in)
- Weight: 93 kg (205 lb)

Fencing career
- Sport: Fencing
- Country: Brazil
- Former country: France
- Weapon: foil
- Hand: left-handed
- Club: Esgrima Pinheiros
- FIE ranking: current ranking
Medal record
Men's foil
Representing Brazil
Pan American Games
Silver medal – second place	2015 Toronto	Team
Bronze medal – third place	2015 Toronto	Individual
Pan American Championships
Silver medal – second place	2015 Santiago	Team
Bronze medal – third place	2014 San José	Team

Ghislain Perrier (born 17 May 1987) is a French foil fencer representing Brazil in international competitions. He was bronze medallist at the 2015 Pan American Games.

== Career ==
Born in Fortaleza, Perrier was adopted by a French couple when he was one year old. He does not know his biological parents and did not learn Portuguese as a child. He first played football and basketball, but had to give up because of his asthma. He turned to fencing rather against his will, but the sport gradually grew on him.

Perrier was formed at Escrime Angoulême under the coaching of Benoît Gonsseaume and Jean-Loup Boulanger. He was selected into the France national team for the 2006 Junior European Championships in Poznań, where they earned a bronze medal, and for the 2006 Junior World Championships, where they took a silver medal. Perrier then joined INSEP, a state-sponsored centre for high-performance athletes. He took part in the 2009 Summer Universiade in Belgrade and won a bronze medal in the team event. He finished second in the 2013 French national championships after being defeated by Erwann Le Péchoux.

After the 2012–13 season Perrier was recruited by the Brazilian Fencing Federation to fence for the Brazil national team under a new rule allowing for the calling of athletes under other criteria than national rankings. His recruitment, along with that of foreign-born athletes in other sports, was understood by the press as an attempt to support Olympic medals expectations in sports where Brazil has little tradition and raised comparisons to the "Plastic Brit" phenomenon.

In the 2013–14 season Perrier won a bronze medal in the satellite tournaments of Amsterdam and London. He climbed his first World Cup podium with a bronze medal in Seoul, defeating along the way Olympic team champions Giorgio Avola and Valerio Aspromonte. He reached the quarter-finals in the Pan American Championships, but was defeated by Gerek Meinhardt of the United States. At the World Championships in Kazan Perrier lost in the second round to reigning European champion James-Andrew Davis of Great Britain. In the team event Brazil prevailed over the Czech Republic in the first round, then were crushed by Italy and finished 17th. Perrier ended the season No.26 in world rankings, a career best so far.

The 2014–15 season was a difficult one for Perrier, who never managed to pass the first round in a World Cup event and stopped at the quarter-finals at the 2015 Pan American Championships. He bounced back at the 2015 Pan American Games by reaching the semi-finals. He was defeated by the USA's Gerek Meinhardt and came away with a bronze medal.
