= 2013–14 Fencing World Cup =

International fencing competition

The 43rd FIE Fencing World Cup began in October 2013 and concluded in July 2014 at the 2014 World Fencing Championships held in Kazan. The World Cup medals were awarded during the FIE's gala dinner in Rome at Palazzo Colonna on 22 November 2014.

== Season overview ==
Several high-profile fencers returned to competition after post-London 2012 breaks, including Romania's Simona Gherman, Italy's Mara Navarria and Russia's Sofiya Velikaya.

The season saw the domination of Italy in women's foil. In individual foil, Arianna Errigo win her fourth World Cup series in women's foil, the third time in a row. Three other Italians, Elisa Di Francisca, Martina Batini and Valentina Vezzali, follow her in the individual rankings. The four of them form the so-called “Dream Team”, which won every World Cup tournament of the season, the continental and the world championships. Olha Kharlan maintained her domination over women's sabre, winning the continental championship, the World Championships and the World Cup for the second time in a row. In épée veteran Emese Szász won her second series after her 2009–10 crown.

The men's events were dominated by Asian countries. Korea's Gu Bon-gil was the first non-European to win the men's sabre series, pipping to the post his fellow countryman Kim Jung-hwan by only six points. Russia maintained however a tenuous lead in men's team sabre. In foil China's Ma Jianfei broke Andrea Cassarà's string of victories. In épée 19-year-old Park Sang-young, who ranked third, proved the revelation of the season. 2013–14 saw France's return to form, with veteran Ulrich Robeiri winning the men's épée series, young Enzo Lefort placing second in foil, and France taking the lead in team men's épée and foil.

The season was also marked by Ukraine's boycott of the men's and women's Moscow World Cup in protest at the death of a Ukrainian soldier in the Simferopol incident.

== Individual épée ==
=== Top 10 ===
Men
1	(France) Ulrich Robeiri	183
2	(Ukraine) Bohdan Nikishyn	163
3	(South Korea) Park Sang-young	159
4	(Italy) Enrico Garozzo	147
5	(South Korea) Jung Jin-sun	136
6	(Hungary) András Rédli	134
7	(France) Gauthier Grumier	134
8	(Switzerland) Max Heinzer	127
9	(Switzerland) Fabian Kauter	125
10	(South Korea) Park Kyoung-doo	121

Women
1	(Hungary) Emese Szász	185
2	(Italy) Rossella Fiamingo	169
3	(China) Sun Yujie	152
4	(Ukraine) Yana Shemyakina	145
5	(Romania) Ana Maria Brânză	134
6	(South Korea) Choi In-jeong	130
7	(Germany) Britta Heidemann	128
8	(Russia) Violetta Kolobova	127
9	(United States) Courtney Hurley	109
10	(Estonia) Erika Kirpu	106

=== Men's épée ===
Date	Event	Type	Gold	Silver	Bronze
12 October 2013	Kupittaa tournament, Turku	Satellite	Nikolai Novosjolov (EST)	Sten Priinits (EST)	Kasper Roslander (FIN); Teemu Seeve (FIN)
26 October 2013	Tournoi satellite, Copenhagen	Satellite	Luca Ferraris (ITA)	Andrea Cipriani (ITA)	Mihails Jefremenko (LAT); Frederik von der Osten (DEN)
9 November 2013	Tournoi satellite, Arhus	Satellite	Troels Christian Robl (DEN)	Toni Kneist (GER)	Klaus Albert Caning (DEN); Uwe Kirschen (GER)
16 November 2013	Tournoi satellite, Antalya	Satellite	Guray Sir (TUR)	Vitali Sokolovski (BLR)	Okan Karadeniz (TUR); Jacopo Marini (ITA)
23 November 2013	Tournoi satellite, Oslo	Satellite	Anatoliy Herey (UKR)	Tor Forsse (SWE)	Mateusz Nycz (POL); Victor von Platen (SWE)
30 November 2013	Belgrade Trophy, Belgrade	Satellite	Jan Bidovec (SLO)	Jan Golobič (SLO)	Lorenzo Bruttini (ITA); Ionuț Trandafirescu (ROU)
7 December 2013	Tournoi satellite, Dublin	Satellite	Ido Ajzenstadt (ISR)	João Cordeiro (POR)	Radu Andrei (ROU); Alarico Bosio (ITA)
11 January 2014	SAF Pokalen, Stockholm	Satellite	Mateusz Nycz (POL)	Kasper Roslander (FIN)	Raffaello Marzani (ITA); Niko Vuorinen (FIN)
16 January 2014	Grand Prix du Qatar 2014, Doha	Grand Prix	Park Sang-young (KOR)	Enrico Garozzo (ITA)	Anton Avdeev (RUS); Bohdan Nikishyn (UKR)
24 January 2014	Coupe du monde, Legnano	World Cup	Jung Jin-sun (KOR)	Jean-Michel Lucenay (FRA)	Daniel Jérent (FRA); Iván Trevejo (FRA)
14 February 2014	Heidenheimer Pokal, Heidenheim an der Brenz	World Cup	Bohdan Nikishyn (UKR)	András Rédli (HUN)	Jiří Beran (CZE); Silvio Fernández (VEN)
21 February 2014	Glaive de Tallinn, Tallinn	World Cup	Max Heinzer (SUI)	Bas Verwijlen (NED)	Dong Chao (CHN); Gauthier Grumier (FRA)
15 March 2014	International Hapoel games, Ashkelon	Satellite	Grigori Beskin (ISR)	Ido Herpe (ISR)	Daniel Lis (ISR); Dmitriy Prokhorov (ISR)
22 March 2014	Victor Gantsevich Grand Prix, Vancouver	Grand Prix	Fabian Kauter (SUI)	Nikolai Novosjolov (EST)	Marco Fichera (ITA); Iván Trevejo (FRA)
2 May 2014	Challenge Réseau ferré de France-Trophée Monal, Paris	World Cup	Pavel Sukhov (RUS)	Alex Fava (FRA)	Jung Jin-sun (KOR); Jean-Michel Lucenay (FRA)
10 May 2014	Grand Prix de Berne, Bern	Grand Prix	Park Sang-young (KOR)	Ulrich Robeiri (FRA)	Ito Inochi (JPN); Daniel Jérent (FRA)
17 May 2014	Tournoi satellite, Split	Satellite	Otto Tardi (ROU)	Athos Schwantes (BRA)	Jorg Mathe (AUT); Uwe Kirschen (GER)
25 May 2014	Jockey Club Argentino, Buenos Aires	World Cup	Bohdan Nikishyn (UKR)	Gauthier Grumier (FRA)	Silvio Fernández (VEN); Jörg Fiedler (GER)
1 June 2014	Pan American Championships, San José	Zone	Francisco Limardo (VEN)	Nicolas Ferreira (BRA)	Kelvin Cañas (VEN); Jason Pryor (USA)
7 June 2014	European Championships, Strasbourg	Zone	András Rédli (HUN)	Paolo Pizzo (ITA)	Max Heinzer (SUI); Jean-Michel Lucenay (FRA)
14 June 2014	African Championships, Cairo	Zone	Ahmed El-Saghir (EGY)	Ayman Mohamed Fayez (EGY)	Abdelkarim El Haouari (MAR); Muhannad Saif El-Din (EGY)
4 July 2014	Asian Championships, Suwon	Zone	Jung Jin-sun (KOR)	Keisuke Sakamoto (JPN)	Park Kyoung-doo (KOR); Roman Aleksandrov (UZB)
17 July 2014	World Championships, Kazan	Zone	Ulrich Robeiri (FRA)	Park Kyoung-doo (KOR)	Enrico Garozzo (ITA); Gauthier Grumier (FRA)

=== Women's épée ===
Date	Event	Type	Gold	Silver	Bronze
13 October 2013	Kupittaa tournament, Turku	Satellite	Kristina Kuusk (EST)	Johanna Bergdahl (SWE)	Erika Kirpu (EST); Katrina Lehis (EST)
26 October 2013	Tournoi satellite, Copenhagen	Satellite	Brenda Briasco (ITA)	Katrina Lehis (EST)	Laura Kieslich (GER); Alexandra Ndolo (GER)
9 November 2013	Tournoi satellite, Arhus	Satellite	Lis Fautsch (LUX)	Romana Caran (SRB)	Emilia Cecilie Borrye (DEN); Smiljka Rodić (SRB)
16 November 2013	Tournoi satellite, Antalya	Satellite	Alexandra Ndolo (GER)	Julia Kirschen (GER)	Aslıhan Kayabaş (TUR); Begüm Ataker (TUR)
24 November 2013	Tournoi satellite, Oslo	Satellite	Sanne Gars (SWE)	Irina Embrich (EST)	Kinka Barvestad (SWE); Emma Samuelsson (SWE)
30 November 2013	Belgrade Trophy, Belgrade	Satellite	Pia Klafstad (NOR)	Ana Maria Constantin (ROU)	Aleksandra Jevremović (SRB); Kata Mihály (HUN)
12 January 2014	SAF Pokalen, Stockholm	Satellite	Johanna Bergdahl (SWE)	Sanne Gars (SWE)	Julia Oleinik (ITA); Emma Samuelsson (SWE)
16 January 2014	World Cup Qatar, Doha	World Cup	Tiffany Géroudet (SUI)	Julia Beljajeva (EST)	Julianna Révész (HUN); Monika Sozanska (GER)
1 February 2014	Westend Grand Prix "in Memoriam Sákovics József", Budapest	World Cup	Ana Maria Brânză (ROU)	Irina Embrich (EST)	Rossella Fiamingo (ITA); Lyubov Shutova (RUS)
7 February 2014	Sparkassen-Weltcup, Leipzig	World Cup	Violetta Kolobova (RUS)	Yana Shemyakina (UKR)	Emese Szász (HUN); Kong Man Wai (HKG)
28 February 2014	Challenge International de Saint-Maur, Saint-Maur-des-Fossés	World Cup	Xu Anqi (CHN)	Rossella Fiamingo (ITA)	Ana Maria Brânză (ROU); Kelley Hurley (USA)
7 March 2014	Trofeu Internacional Ciutat de Barcelona, Barcelona	World Cup	Emese Szász (HUN)	Yana Zvereva (RUS)	Qin Xue (CHN); Alberta Santuccio (ITA)
26 April 2014	Tournoi International, Xuzhou	World Cup	Sun Yujie (CHN)	Xu Anqi (CHN)	Marie-Florence Candassamy (FRA); Britta Heidemann (GER)
16 May 2014	Épée internationale, Rio de Janeiro	World Cup	Lauren Rembi (FRA)	Emese Szász (HUN)	Sun Yujie (CHN); Violetta Kolobova (RUS)
17 May 2014	Tournoi satellite, Split	World Cup	Kelly Boone (NED)	Romana Caran (SRB)	Dorottya Babinszki (HUN); Vivien Várnai (HUN)
22 May 2014	Grand Prix, Havana	Grand Prix	Hao Jialu (CHN)	Courtney Hurley (USA)	Simona Gherman (ROU); Emese Szász (HUN)
1 June 2014	Pan American Championships, San José	Zone	Courtney Hurley (USA)	Katharine Holmes (USA)	Isabel Di Tella (ARG); Anna Van Brummen (USA)
8 June 2014	European Championships, Strasbourg	Zone	Bianca Del Carretto (ITA)	Marie-Florence Candassamy (FRA)	Simona Gherman (ROU); Joséphine Jacques-André-Coquin (FRA)
14 June 2014	African Championships, Cairo	Zone	Sarra Besbes (TUN)	Julianna Barrett (RSA)	Ayah Mahdy (EGY); Salma Mokabel (EGY)
3 July 2014	Asian Championships, Suwon	Zone	Choi In-jeong (KOR)	Shin A-lam (KOR)	Ayaka Shimookawa (JPN); Qin Xue (CHN)
17 July 2014	World Championships, Kazan	Zone	Rossella Fiamingo (ITA)	Britta Heidemann (GER)	Erika Kirpu (EST); Yana Shemyakina (UKR)

== Individual foil ==
=== Top 10 ===
Men
1	(China) Ma Jianfei	239
2	(France) Enzo Lefort	207
3	(Russia) Aleksey Cheremisinov	159
4	(United States) Gerek Meinhardt	171
5	(Czech Republic) Alexander Choupenitch	145
6	(United Kingdom) James-Andrew Davis	141
7	(United States) Alexander Massialas	125
8	(Italy) Andrea Cassarà	121
9	(Russia) Dmitry Rigin	113
10	(United States) Race Imboden	108

Women
1	(Italy) Arianna Errigo	300
2	(Italy) Elisa Di Francisca	212
3	(Italy) Martina Batini	198
4	(Italy) Valentina Vezzali	183
5	(Tunisia) Inès Boubakri	169
6	(Russia) Inna Deriglazova	161
7	(United States) Lee Kiefer	129
8	(South Korea) Jeon Hee-sook	127
9	(Russia) Larisa Korobeynikova	116
10	(United States) Nzingha Prescod	115

=== Men's foil ===
Date	Event	Type	Gold	Silver	Bronze
9 November 2013	Tournoi satellite, Amsterdam	Satellite	Tomasz Ciepły (POL)	André Sanità (GER)	Ghislain Perrier (BRA); Roman Djitli (FRA)
1 December 2013	Leon Paul satellite fleuret masculin, London	Satellite	Maor Hatoel (ISR)	Tobia Biondo (ITA)	Kristjan Archer (GBR); Ghislain Perrier (BRA)
17 January 2014	Challenge International de Paris, Paris	World Cup	Enzo Lefort (FRA)	Andrea Cassarà (ITA)	Peter Joppich (GER); Gerek Meinhardt (USA)
21 February 2014	Tournoi Ciudad de A Coruña, La Coruña	World Cup	Ma Jianfei (CHN)	Alexander Choupenitch (CZE)	Yuki Ota (JPN); Son Young-ki (KOR)
1 March 2014	Fleuret de Saint-Pétersbourg, Saint Petersburg	Grand Prix	Andrea Baldini (ITA)	Enzo Lefort (FRA)	Valerio Aspromonte (ITA); Dmitry Komissarov (RUS)
15 March 2014	Coupe Ville de Venise, Venice	Grand Prix	Ma Jianfei (CHN)	Enzo Lefort (FRA)	Kwak Jun-hyuk (KOR); Alexander Choupenitch (CZE)
21 March 2014	Löwe von Bonn, Bonn	World Cup	Andrea Cassarà (ITA)	Aleksey Cheremisinov (RUS)	Andrea Baldini (ITA); Ma Jianfei (CHN)
25 April 2014	SK Trophy, Seoul	World Cup	Alexander Massialas (USA)	Race Imboden (USA)	Richard Kruse (GBR); Ghislain Perrier (BRA)
5 March 2014	Prince Takamado World Cup, Tokyo	Grand Prix	Gerek Meinhardt (USA)	Ma Jianfei (CHN)	Race Imboden (USA); Alexander Massialas (USA)
10 May 2014	Tournoi satellite, Copenhagen	Satellite	Philippe Jørgensen (DEN)	Simon Rizell (SWE)	Laurence Halsted (GBR); Roland Schlosser (AUT)
23 May 2014	Copa Villa La Habana, Havana	World Cup	Dmitry Rigin (RUS)	Yuki Ota (JPN)	Aleksey Cheremisinov (RUS); Enzo Lefort (FRA)
1 June 2014	Pan American Championships, San José	Zone	Gerek Meinhardt (USA)	Alexander Massialas (USA)	Felipe Guillermo Saucedo (ARG); Guilherme Toldo (BRA)
9 June 2014	European Championships, Strasbourg	Zone	James-Andrew Davis (GBR)	Aleksey Cheremisinov (RUS)	Peter Joppich (GER); Erwann Le Péchoux (FRA)
20 June 2014	African Championships, Cairo	Zone	Mohamed Samandi (TUN)	Tarek Ayad (EGY)	Alaaeldin Abouelkassem (EGY); Mohamed Ayoub Ferjani (TUN)
3 July 2014	Asian Championships, Suwon	Zone	Heo Jun (KOR)	Chen Haiwei (CHN)	Kenta Chida (JPN); Li Chen (CHN)
17 July 2014	World Championships, Kazan	Zone	Aleksey Cheremisinov (RUS)	Ma Jianfei (CHN)	Enzo Lefort (FRA); Timur Safin (RUS)

=== Women's foil ===
Date	Event	Type	Gold	Silver	Bronze
31 January 2014	The Artus Court PKO BP, Gdańsk	Grand Prix	Arianna Errigo (ITA)	Nzingha Prescod (USA)	Larisa Korobeynikova (RUS); Le Huilin (CHN)
7 February 2014	Coupe du monde, Budapest	World Cup	Valentina Cipriani (ITA)	Alice Volpi (ITA)	Nam Hyun-hee (KOR); Arianna Errigo (ITA)
26 February 2014	Fleuret de Saint-Pétersbourg, Saint Petersburg	World Cup	Arianna Errigo (ITA)	Elisa Di Francisca (ITA)	Inna Deriglazova (RUS); Yulia Biryukova (RUS)
14 March 2014	Reinhold-Würth-Cup, Tauberbischofsheim	World Cup	Martina Batini (ITA)	Elisa Di Francisca (ITA)	Inès Boubakri (TUN); Jeon Hee-sook (KOR)
21 March 2014	Coupe du monde, Turin	World Cup	Inna Deriglazova (RUS)	Elisa Di Francisca (ITA)	Arianna Errigo (ITA); Anastasia Ivanova (RUS)
26 April 2014	SK Trophée, Seoul	Grand Prix	Valentina Vezzali (ITA)	Arianna Errigo (ITA)	Martina Batini (ITA); Jung Gil-ok (KOR)
2 May 2014	Coupe du monde, Shanghai	World Cup	Arianna Errigo (ITA)	Inna Deriglazova (RUS)	Jeon Hee-sook (KOR); Ysaora Thibus (FRA)
11 May 2014	Tournoi satellite, Copenhagen	Satellite	Ana Beatriz Bulcão (BRA)	Rachel Taís (BRA)	Ester Schreiber (SWE); Liane Ye Ying Wong (SIN)
24 May 2014	Challenge Jeanty, Marseille	Grand Prix	Arianna Errigo (ITA)	Inna Deriglazova (RUS)	Elisa Di Francisca (ITA); Carolina Erba (ITA)
1 June 2014	Pan American Championships, San José	Zone	Lee Kiefer (USA)	Kelleigh Ryan (CAN)	Nzingha Prescod (USA); Isis Jiménez (VEN)
10 June 2014	European Championships, Strasbourg	Zone	Elisa Di Francisca (ITA)	Martina Batini (ITA)	Yulia Biryukova (RUS); Valentina Vezzali (ITA)
14 June 2014	African Championships, Cairo	Zone	Inès Boubakri (TUN)	Eman Shaaba (EGY)	Anissa Khelfaoui (ALG); Amena Nour (EGY)
2 July 2014	Asian Championships, Suwon	Zone	Nam Hyun-hee (KOR)	Jeon Hee-sook (KOR)	Le Huilin (CHN); Chen Bingbing (CHN)
17 July 2014	World Championships, Kazan	Zone	Arianna Errigo (ITA)	Martina Batini (ITA)	Inès Boubakri (TUN); Valentina Vezzali (ITA)

== Individual sabre ==
=== Top 10 ===
Men
1	(South Korea) Gu Bon-gil	209
2	(South Korea) Kim Jung-hwan	203
3	(Hungary) Áron Szilágyi	179
4	(Russia) Aleksey Yakimenko	178
5	(Romania) Tiberiu Dolniceanu	167
6	(Italy) Enrico Berrè	156
7	(Italy) Aldo Montano	152
8	(Italy) Diego Occhiuzzi	150
9	(Italy) Luigi Samele	142
10	(Russia) Veniamin Reshetnikov	108

Women
1	(Ukraine) Olha Kharlan	314
2	(United States) Mariel Zagunis	245
3	(Russia) Yekaterina Dyachenko	183
4	(Greece) Vassiliki Vougiouka	162
5	(United States) Dagmara Wozniak	155
6	(South Korea) Kim Ji-yeon	150
7	(United States) Anne-Elizabeth Stone	132
8	(China) Shen Chen	116
9	(France) Charlotte Lembach	116
10	(Poland) Aleksandra Socha	116

=== Men's sabre ===
Date	Event	Type	Gold	Silver	Bronze
19 October 2013	Tournoi satellite sabre masculin, Ghent	Satellite	Seppe Van Holsbeke (BEL)	Tamás Decsi (HUN)	Thomas James Mottershead (GBR); Riccardo Nuccio (ITA)
9 November 2013	Tournoi satellite sabre masculin, Amsterdam	Satellite	Tamás Decsi (HUN)	Giovanni Repetti (ITA)	Gilbert Schwarz (AUT); Matthias Willau (AUT)
26 February 2014	Normann-Jørgensen Cup, Copenhagen	Satellite	Tamás Decsi (HUN)	Nikolai Nikolic (AUT)	Alexandre Woog (ISR); Julien Hirsch (FRA)
7 February 2014	Villa de Madrid, Madrid	World Cup	Kim Jung-hwan (KOR)	Csanád Gémesi (HUN)	Tiberiu Dolniceanu (ROU); Diego Occhiuzzi (ITA)
14 February 2014	Trophée Luxardo, Padova	World Cup	Áron Szilágyi (HUN)	Gu Bon-gil (KOR)	Enrico Berrè (ITA); Luigi Samele (ITA)
8 March 2014	Gerevich-Kovács-Kárpáti Grand Prix, Budapest	Grand Prix	Kim Jung-hwan (KOR)	Áron Szilágyi (HUN)	Diego Occhiuzzi (ITA); Luigi Samele (ITA)
21 March 2014	Sabre de Moscou, Moscow	World Cup	Tiberiu Dolniceanu (ROU)	Kim Jung-hwan (KOR)	Veniamin Reshetnikov (RUS); Matyas Szabo (GER)
25 April 2014	Coupe Akropolis, Athens	World Cup	Áron Szilágyi (HUN)	Kim Jung-hwan (KOR)	Veniamin Reshetnikov (RUS); Aleksey Yakimenko (RUS)
2 May 2014	Absolute Fencing Korfanty World Cup, Chicago	Grand Prix	Luigi Samele (ITA)	Aldo Montano (ITA)	Enrico Berrè (ITA); Aleksey Yakimenko (RUS)
11 May 2014	Tournoi satellite, Reykjavík	Satellite	Alexander Weber (GER)	Stephen Rocks (GBR)	Deniz Berkay (USA); Hilmar-Örn Jónsson (ISL)
17 May 2014	Sabre de Wolodyjowski, Warsaw	Grand Prix	Aldo Montano (ITA)	Max Hartung (GER)	Luigi Samele (ITA); Aleksey Yakimenko (RUS)
25 May 2014	Glaive d'Asparoukh, Plovdiv	Grand Prix	Enrico Berrè (ITA)	Diego Occhiuzzi (ITA)	Tiberiu Dolniceanu (ROU); Kim Jung-hwan (KOR)
1 June 2014	Pan American Championships, San José	Zone	Eli Dershwitz (USA)	Philippe Beaudry (CAN)	Renzo Agresta (BRA); Daryl Homer (USA)
10 June 2014	European Championships, Strasbourg	Zone	Aleksey Yakimenko (RUS)	Veniamin Reshetnikov (RUS)	Kamil Ibragimov (RUS); Csanád Gémesi (HUN)
22 June 2014	African Championships, Cairo	Zone	Ziad Elsissy (EGY)	Yémi Apithy (BEN)	Aly Adel (EGY); Amine Akkari (TUN)
2 July 2014	Asian Championships, Suwon	Zone	Gu Bon-gil (KOR)	Mojtaba Abedini (IRI)	Ali Pakdaman (IRI); Lam Hin Chung (HKG)
17 July 2014	World Championships, Kazan	World	Nikolay Kovalev (RUS)	Gu Bon-gil (KOR)	Tiberiu Dolniceanu (ROU); Aleksey Yakimenko (RUS)

=== Women's sabre ===
Date	Event	Type	Gold	Silver	Bronze
31 January 2014	Trophée BNP Paribas, Orléans	Grand Prix	Olha Kharlan (UKR)	Kim Ji-yeon (KOR)	Yekaterina Dyachenko (RUS); Mariel Zagunis (USA)
7 February 2014	Coupe du monde, Dakar	World Cup	Olha Kharlan (UKR)	Charlotte Lembach (FRA)	Ilaria Bianco (ITA); Anne-Elizabeth Stone (USA)
21 February 2014	Challenge Yves Brasseur, Ghent	World Cup	Olha Kharlan (UKR)	Mariel Zagunis (USA)	Dagmara Wozniak (USA); Dina Galiakbarova (RUS)
28 February 2014	Coupe du monde, Bolzano	World Cup	Mariel Zagunis (USA)	Olha Kharlan (UKR)	Rossella Gregorio (ITA); Vassiliki Vougiouka (GRE)
14 March 2014	Tournoi International, Antalya	World Cup	Cécilia Berder (FRA)	Yuliya Gavrilova (RUS)	Shen Chen (CHN); Rossella Gregorio (ITA)
21 March 2014	Grand Prix, Moscow	Grand Prix	Yekaterina Dyachenko (RUS)	Vassiliki Vougiouka (GRE)	Ibtihaj Muhammad (USA); Anne-Elizabeth Stone (USA)
2 May 2014	Absolute Fencing Korfanty World Cup, Chicago	World Cup	Mariel Zagunis (USA)	Viktoriya Kovaleva (RUS)	Charlotte Lembach (FRA); Irene Vecchi (ITA)
10 May 2014	Tournoi satellite, Reykjavík	Satellite	Aleksandra Shatalova (RUS)	María Belén Pérez Maurice (ARG)	Adriana Attar Cohen (ARG); Ekaterina Titova (RUS)
24 May 2014	Coupe du monde, Beijing	Grand Prix	Olha Kharlan (UKR)	Shen Chen (CHN)	Kim Ji-yeon (KOR); Charlotte Lembach (FRA)
1 June 2014	Pan American Championships, San José	Zone	María Belén Pérez Maurice (ARG)	Mariel Zagunis (USA)	Dagmara Wozniak (USA); Ibtihaj Muhammad (USA)
9 June 2014	European Championships, Strasbourg	Zone	Olha Kharlan (UKR)	Yekaterina Dyachenko (RUS)	Rossella Gregorio (ITA); Vassiliki Vougiouka (GRE)
14 June 2014	African Championships, Cairo	Zone	Azza Besbes (TUN)	Amira Ben Chaabane (TUN)	Abik Boungab (EGY); Nada Hafez (TUN)
2 July 2014	Asian Championships, Suwon	Zone	Kim Ji-yeon (KOR)	Emura Misaki (JPN)	Shen Chen (CHN); Lee Ra-jin (KOR)
17 July 2014	World Championships, Kazan	World	Olha Kharlan (UKR)	Mariel Zagunis (USA)	Yekaterina Dyachenko (RUS); Yana Egorian (RUS)

== Team épée ==
=== Top 10 ===
Men
1	France	338
2	Switzerland	332
3	South Korea	328
4	Italy	256
5	Ukraine	254
6	Russia	232
7	Hungary	225
8	Poland	208
9	China	192
10	Venezuela	178

Women
1	Russia	368
2	China	292
3	Romania	290
4	Estonia	287
5	Hungary	286
6	United States	262
7	Italy	258
8	France	215
9	South Korea	208
10	Sweden	195

=== Men's team épée ===
Date	Event	Gold	Silver	Bronze
26 January 2014	Coupe du Monde par équipes, Legnano	Ukraine	Poland	France
16 February 2014	Coupe du monde par équipes "Heidenheimer Pokal", Heidenheim an der Brenz	Switzerland	South Korea	China
23 March 2014	Coupe du Monde par équipes, Tallinn	Italy	Hungary	France
4 May 2014	Coupe du Monde par équipes-Trophée Monal, Paris	Switzerland	Italy	South Korea
25 May 2014	Coupe du Monde par équipes, Buenos Aires	France	Russia	Hungary
4 June 2014	Pan American Championships, San José	Cuba	Canada	United States
11 June 2014	European Championships, Strasbourg	Switzerland	Spain	Russia
14 June 2014	African Championships, Cairo	Egypt	Morocco	Senegal
2 July 2014	Asian Championships, Suwon	South Korea	China	Japan
17 July 2014	World Championships, Kazan	France	South Korea	Switzerland

=== Women's team épée ===
Date	Event	Gold	Silver	Bronze
19 January 2014	Coupe du Monde par équipes, Doha	Romania	China	Hungary
9 February 2014	Coupe du monde par équipes "Sparkassen-Weltcup", Leipzig	Hungary	Russia	China
2 March 2014	Coupe du Monde par équipes, Saint-Maur-des-Fossés	Estonia	Sweden	Russia
9 March 2014	Coupe du Monde par équipes, Barcelona	Russia	Hungary	Romania
18 May 2014	Coupe du Monde par équipes, Rio de Janeiro	France	China	Italy
1 June 2014	Pan American Championships, San José	United States	Venezuela	Brazil
7 June 2014	European Championships, Strasbourg	Romania	Russia	Italy
14 June 2014	African Championships, Cairo	Tunisia	South Africa	Egypt
2 July 2014	Asian Championships, Suwon	China	South Korea	Hong Kong
17 July 2014	World Championships, Kazan	Russia	Estonia	Italy

== Team foil ==
=== Top 10 ===
Men
1	France	404
2	China	324
3	Russia	316
4	Italy	312
5	United States	273
6	South Korea	250
7	Germany	221
8	Japan	197
9	Poland	195
10	United Kingdom	193

Women
1	Italy	448
2	Russia	364
3	South Korea	292
4	France	284
5	United States	235
6	China	221
7	Germany	218
8	Poland	214
9	Canada	195
10	Japan	189

=== Men's team foil ===
Date	Event	Gold	Silver	Bronze
19 January 2014	Challenge International de Paris, Paris	Italy	France	United States
23 February 2014	Coupe du monde par équipes, La Coruña	Switzerland	South Korea	China
23 March 2014	Coupe du Monde par équipes-Löwe von Bonn, Bonn	China	South Korea	Great Britain
27 April 2014	Coupe du Monde par équipes, Seoul	France	Russia	Germany
25 May 2014	Coupe du Monde par équipes, Havana	France	Russia	United States
1 June 2014	Pan American Championships, San José	United States	Canada	Brazil
7 June 2014	European Championships, Strasbourg	France	Italy	Russia
14 June 2014	African Championships, Cairo	Egypt	Tunisia	Senegal
2 July 2014	Asian Championships, Suwon	China	South Korea	Japan
17 July 2014	World Championships, Kazan	France	China	Italy

=== Women's team foil ===
Date	Event	Gold	Silver	Bronze
9 February 2014	Coupe du Monde par équipes, Budapest	Italy	Russia	France
28 February 2014	Coupe du monde par équipes, Saint Petersburg	Italy	Russia	South Korea
16 March 2014	Coupe du Monde par équipes, Tauberbischofsheim	Italy	France	Russia
23 April 2014	Coupe du Monde par équipes, Turino	Italy	Russia	South Korea
4 May 2014	Coupe du Monde par équipes, Shanghai	Italy	Russia	South Korea
6 June 2014	Pan American Championships, San José	United States	Canada	Venezuela
7 June 2014	European Championships, Strasbourg	Italy	Russia	France
14 June 2014	African Championships, Cairo	Egypt	Algeria	_
2 July 2014	Asian Championships, Suwon	South Korea	China	Japan
17 July 2014	World Championships, Kazan	Italy	Russia	France

== Team sabre ==
=== Top 10 ===
Men
1	Russia	356
2	South Korea	352
3	Germany	336
4	Italy	336
5	United States	264
6	Hungary	240
7	Romania	208
8	Belarus	190
9	France	189
10	Iran	176

Women
1	United States	380
2	Russia	372
3	Ukraine	304
4	Italy	294
5	France	280
6	South Korea	231
7	China	229
8	Poland	224
9	Hungary	192
10	Mexico	179

=== Men's team sabre ===
Date	Event	Gold	Silver	Bronze
9 February 2014	Coupe du Monde par équipes, Madrid	South Korea	United States	Hungary
16 February 2014	Coupe du monde par équipes, Padova	Russia	Italy	South Korea
23 March 2014	Coupe du Monde par équipes, Moscow	Russia	Italy	South Korea
27 April 2014	Coupe du Monde par équipes, Athens	Germany	Italy	Russia
25 May 2014	Coupe du Monde par équipes, Chicago	Russia	Italy	South Korea
1 June 2014	Pan American Championships, San José	United States	Canada	Mexico
7 June 2014	European Championships, Strasbourg	Italy	Russia	Germany
14 June 2014	African Championships, Cairo	Egypt	Tunisia	Senegal
2 July 2014	Asian Championships, Suwon	South Korea	Japan	China
17 July 2014	World Championships, Kazan	Germany	South Korea	Hungary

=== Women's team sabre ===
Date	Event	Gold	Silver	Bronze
9 February 2014	Coupe du Monde par équipes, Dakar	Ukraine	Italy	South Korea
23 February 2014	Coupe du monde par équipes, Ghent	Russia	Italy	Ukraine
2 March 2014	Coupe du Monde par équipes, Bolzano	Russia	Italy	Poland
16 March 2014	Coupe du Monde par équipes, Antalya	United States	Russia	Ukraine
4 May 2014	Coupe du Monde par équipes, Chicago	Russia	United States	Ukraine
1 June 2014	Pan American Championships, San José	United States	Mexico	Argentina
7 June 2014	European Championships, Strasbourg	Russia	France	Ukraine
14 June 2014	African Championships, Cairo	Tunisia	Egypt	Algeria
2 July 2014	Asian Championships, Suwon	China	South Korea	Kazakhstan
17 July 2014	World Championships, Kazan	United States	France	Ukraine
