= Vincent Simon (fencer) =

French fencer (born 1990)

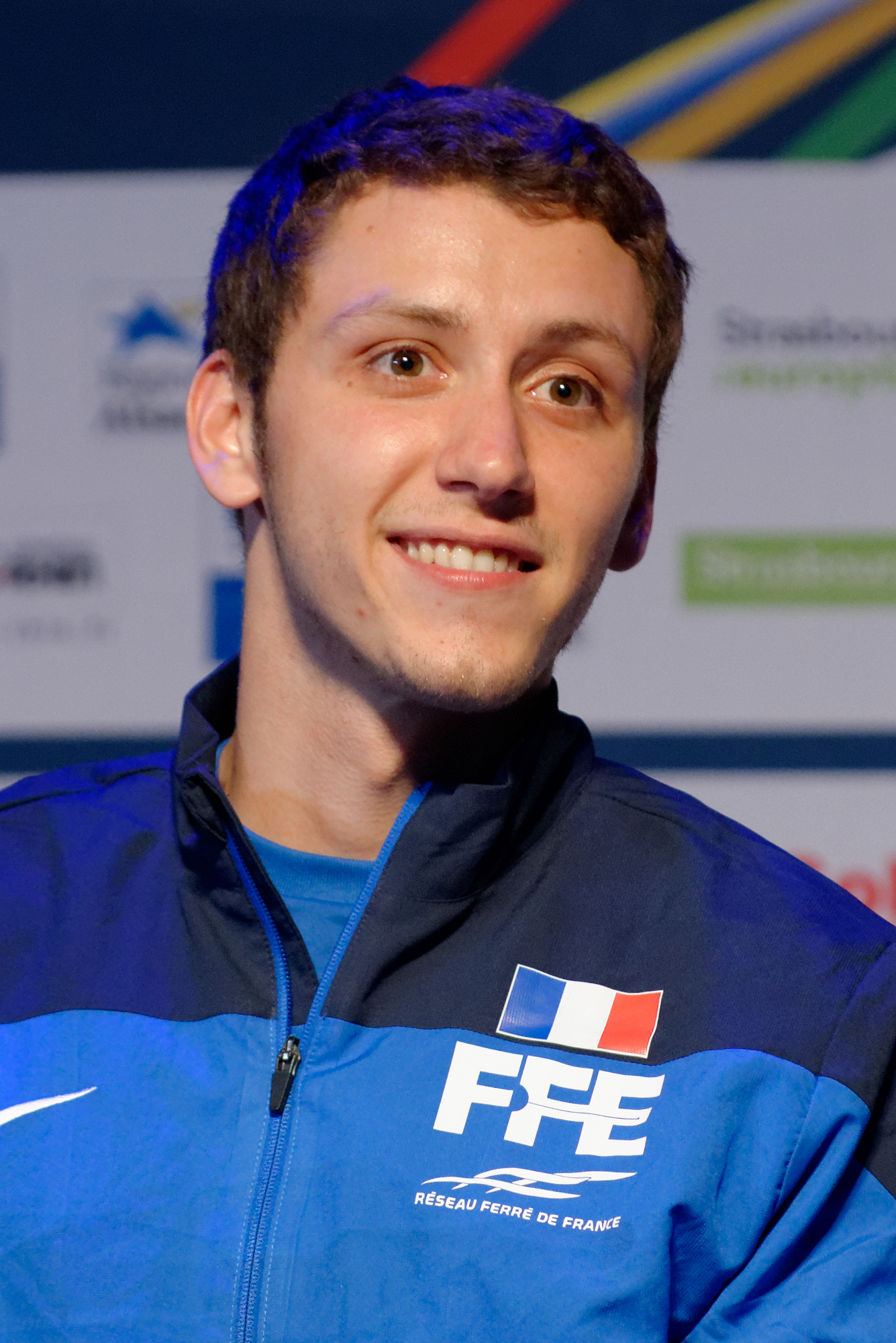

Personal information
- Nickname: Bouli
- Born: 9 April 1990 (age 36)
- Height: 1.85 m (6 ft 1 in)
- Weight: 78 kg (172 lb; 12.3 st)

Fencing career
- Sport: Fencing
- Weapon: Foil
- Hand: left-handed
- National coach: Franck Boidin
- Club: CE Rueil-Malmaison
- FIE ranking: current ranking
Medal record
Representing France
World Championships
Gold medal – first place	2014 Kazan	Team Foil
European Championships
Gold medal – first place	2014 Strasbourg	Team Foil

Vincent Simon (born 9 April 1990) is a French foil fencer, team European and team World champion in 2014.

== Career ==
Simon took up fencing at the age of seven and trained at UJB Escrime in Saint-Dizier under Jérôme Roussat, Charles Roselet and Sylvain Privé. He joined in 2007 the centre for promising young fencers in Châtenay-Malabry and won a team bronze medal at the 2008 Junior World Championships in Acireale. He took part in the 2013 Summer Universiade, reaching the quarter-finals in the individual event and taking a bronze medal with the team.

He made his breakthrough in the 2013–14 season, reaching the quarter-finals at the La Coruña Grand Prix, the Havana Grand Prix and the Tokyo World Cup. He was selected into the national for the European Championships in Strasbourg, but he lost in the first round to teammate Julien Mertine in the individual event. In the team event France defeated the Czech Republic and Russia before prevailing over Italy, allowing Simon to win his first gold medal in a major event. At the World Championships in Kazan he defeated World No.7 Alexander Massialas before ceding in the table of 16 to Alexander Choupenitch of the Czech Republic. In the team event France defeated Russia in the semi-finals and proceeded to crush China to earn the world title.
