= Volodymyr Stankevych =

Ukrainian fencer (born 1995)

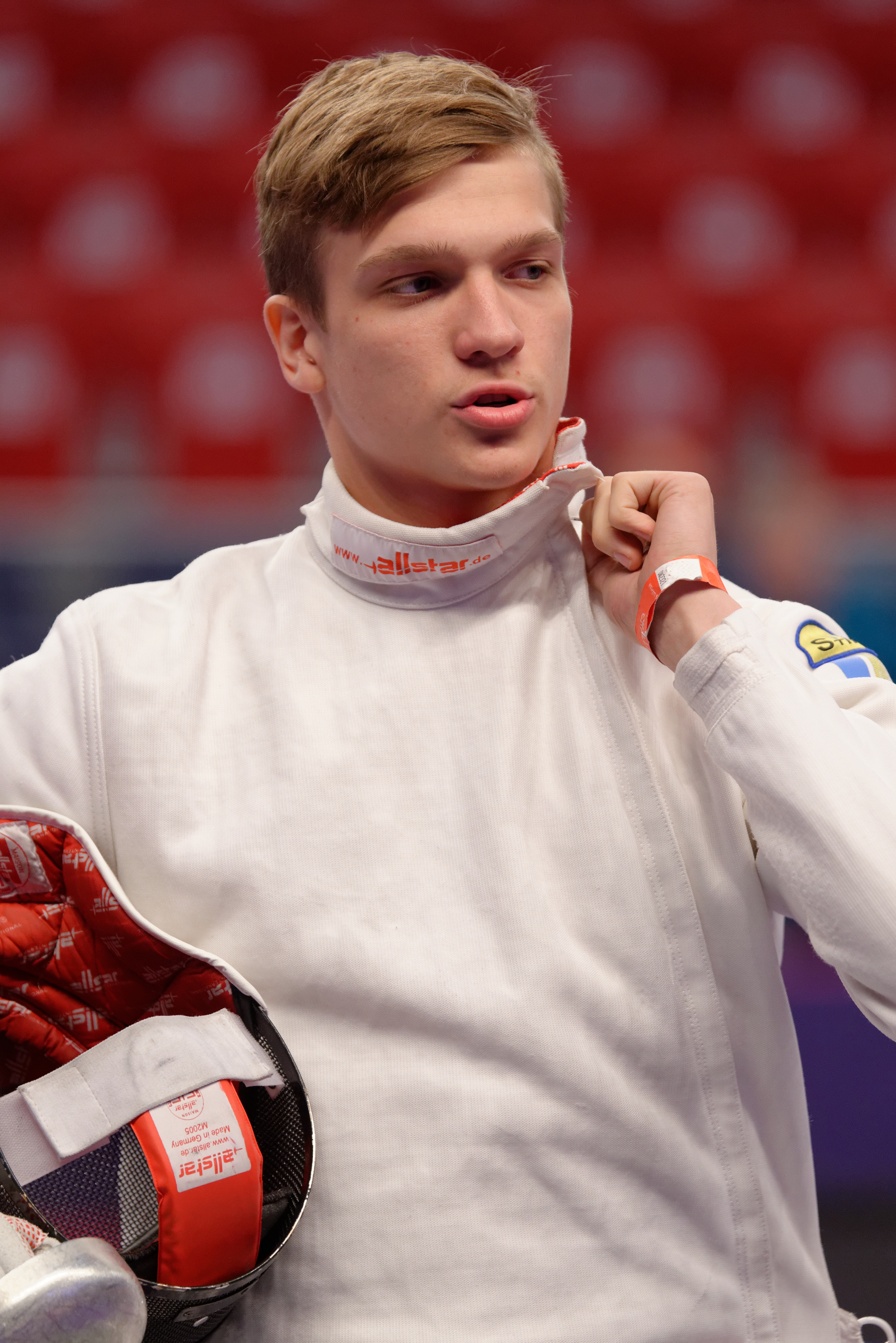

Personal information
- Nationality: Ukrainian
- Born: Володимир Станкевич; 17 May 1995 (age 31) Ukraine

Fencing career
- Sport: Fencing
- Weapon: Épée
- Hand: Right
- National coach: Volodymyr Stankevych
Medal record
Men's athletics
Representing Ukraine
European Games
Bronze medal – third place	2023 Kraków–Małopolska	Individual
European Championships
Silver medal – second place	2017 Tbilisi	Team
Summer Universiade
Silver medal – second place	2015 Gwangju	Team

Volodymyr Stankevych (Ukrainian: Володимир Станкевич; born May 17, 1995) is a Ukrainian épée fencer, team silver medalist in the 2017 European Fencing Championships.

== Career ==
Stankevych's first international success was the silver medal at the 2015 Summer Universiade in Gwangju, South Korea. Since the 2016-17 season he was actively involved in international competitions representing Ukraine. He won a silver medal in the team épée event of the 2017 European Fencing Championships in Tbilisi, Georgia.
