= Timur Safin =

Russian fencer (born 1992)

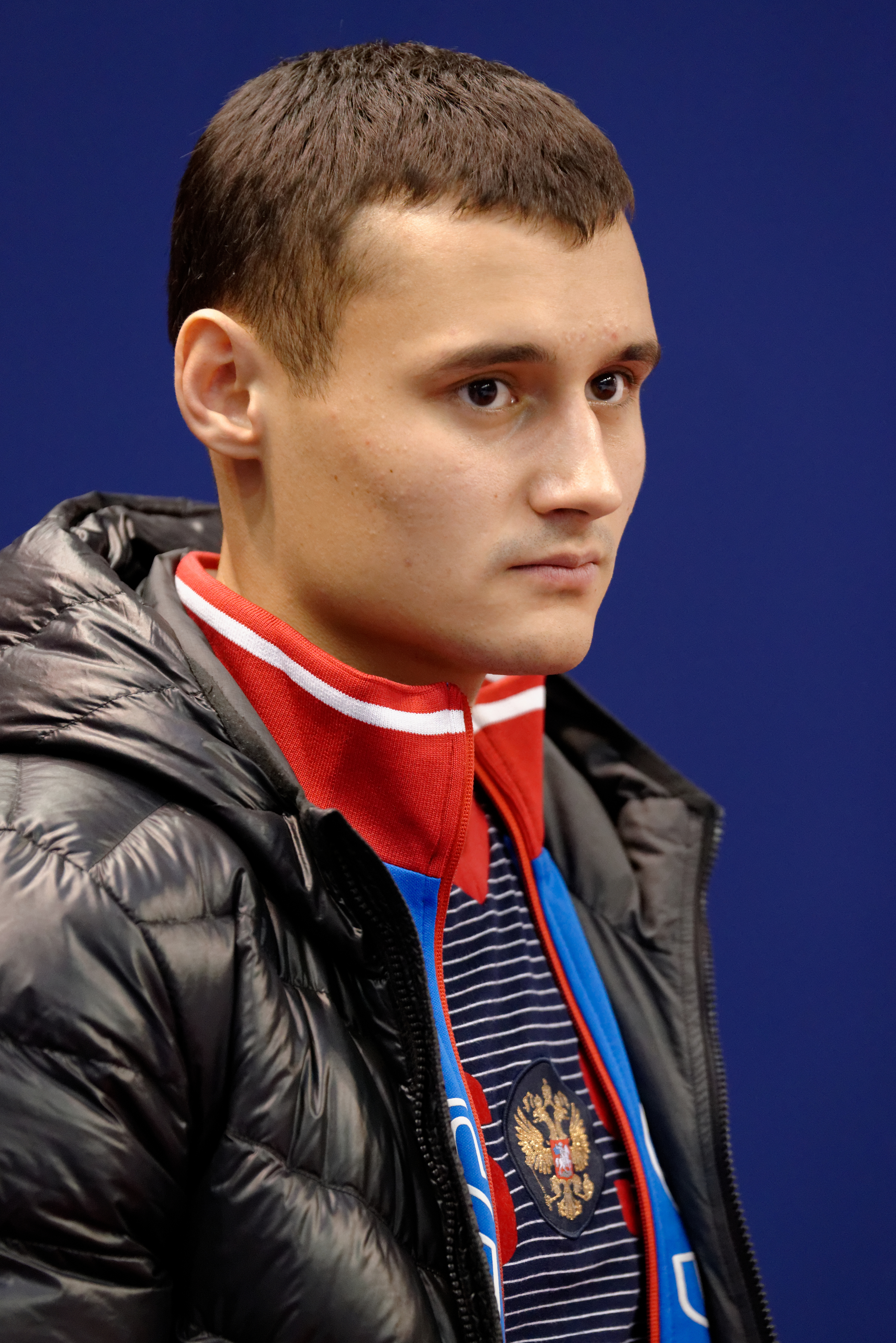
- Safin in 2015

Personal information
- Full name: Timur Marselevich Safin
- Nationality: (Russia) Russian
- Born: 4 August 1992 (age 34) Tashkent, Uzbekistan
- Home town: Ufa, Bashkortostan, Russia
- Height: 1.82 m (6 ft 0 in)
- Weight: 82 kg (181 lb)

Fencing career
- Sport: Fencing
- Country: Russia
- Weapon: Foil, Sabre
- Hand: Right-handed
- National coach: Stefano Cerioni
- Club: Central Sports Army Club [RUS]; Ufa Fencing Sports School of Olympic Reserve [RUS]; SDYUSSHOR No.19
- Head coach: Ruslan Nasibullin, Lira Grushina
- FIE ranking: current ranking
Medal record
Men's fencing
Representing (Russia) ROC
Olympic Games
Silver medal – second place	2020 Tokyo	Team foil
Representing Russia
Olympic Games
Gold medal – first place	2016 Rio de Janeiro	Team foil
Bronze medal – third place	2016 Rio de Janeiro	Individual foil
World Championships
Bronze medal – third place	2014 Kazan	Individual foil
Bronze medal – third place	2018 Wuxi	Team foil
European Championships
Gold medal – first place	2018 Novi Sad	Team foil
Gold medal – first place	2016 Toruń	Individual foil
Gold medal – first place	2016 Toruń	Team foil
Silver medal – second place	2017 Tbilisi	Individual foil
Silver medal – second place	2017 Tbilisi	Team foil
Bronze medal – third place	2014 Strasbourg	Team foil
European Games
Bronze medal – third place	2015 Baku	Team foil
Military World Games
Gold medal – first place	2019 Wuhan	Individual foil
Gold medal – first place	2019 Wuhan	Team foil
Gold medal – first place	2019 Wuhan	Team sabre

Timur Marselevich Safin (Russian: Тимур Марселевич Сафин, IPA: [tʲɪˈmur ˈsafʲɪn]; born 4 August 1992) is a Russian right-handed foil fencer.

He is a two-time team European champion and 2016 individual European champion. A two-time Olympian, Safin is a 2021 team Olympic silver medalist, 2016 team Olympic champion, and 2016 individual Olympic bronze medalist. His clubs are the Central Sports Army Club [RUS], and the Ufa Fencing Sports School of Olympic Reserve.

== Career ==
Safin, who is of Tatar descent, took up fencing when he was nine years old after a coach came to make a presentation at his school. He specialized in foil, joining the junior Russian team in 2009. He earned an individual bronze medal and a team silver medal in the 2011 U23 European Championships in Kazan. He won a team silver medal in the 2012 Junior European Championships and was crowned Junior World champion the same year in Moscow.

In the senior category, he made his breakthrough in the 2013–14 season. He won the Challenge Revenu after defeating in the final team Olympic champion Andrea Baldini. At the 2014 European Championships in Strasbourg, he was defeated in the table of 16 by eventual gold winner James-Andrew Davis, and in the team event he helped Russia conquer a bronze medal. In the 2014 World Championships in Kazan he made his way to the semifinals, defeating along the way German champion Peter Joppich. He lost by a single hit to world no.1 Ma Jianfei of China and came away with a bronze medal. For this performance he was named breakthrough of the year by the Russian Fencing Federation.

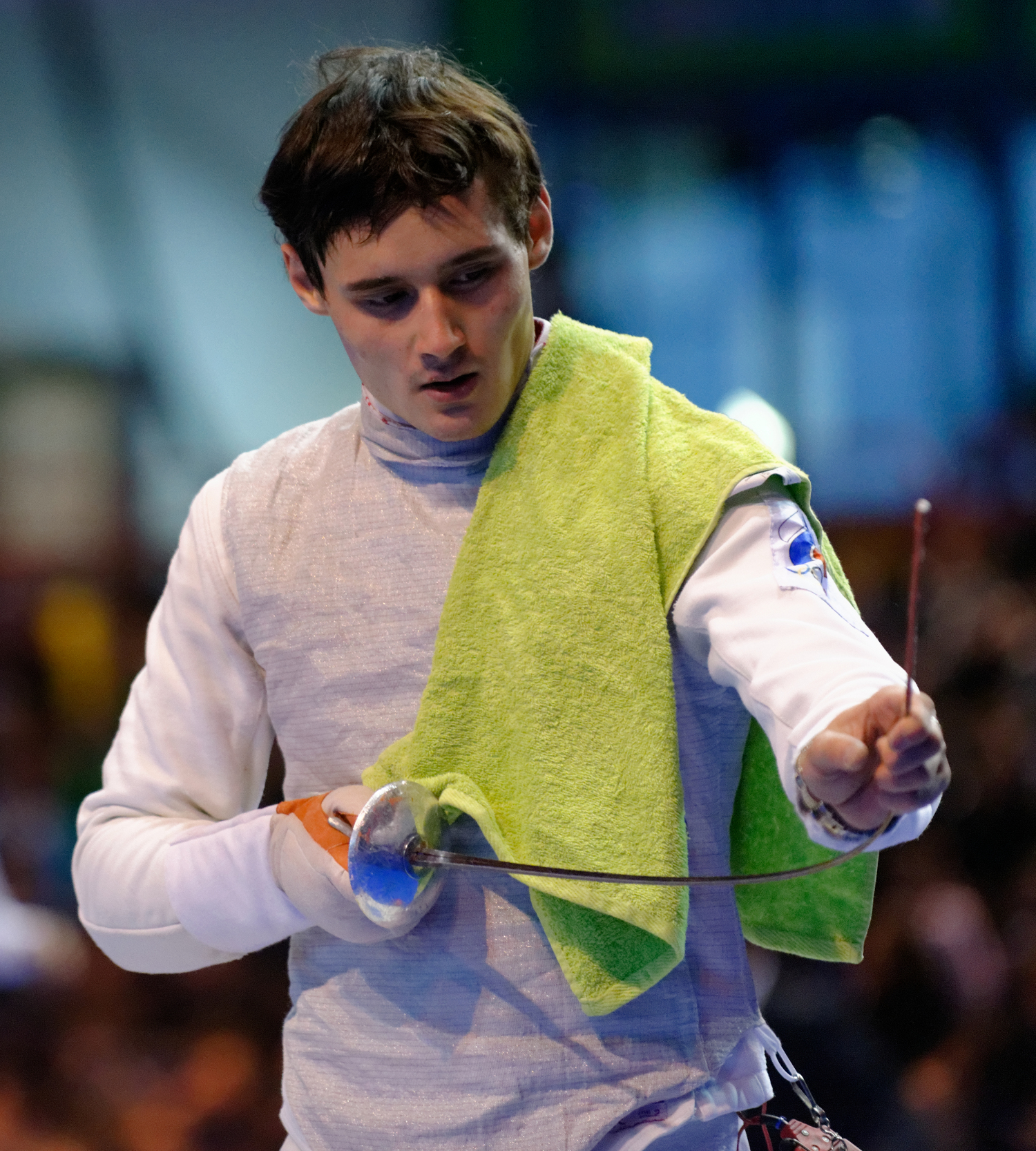
Safin at the 2014 European Fencing Championships.

== Medal record ==
=== Olympic Games ===
Year	Location	Event	Position
2016	Rio de Janeiro, Brazil	Individual Men's Foil	3rd
2016	Rio de Janeiro, Brazil	Team Men's Foil	1st
2021	Tokyo, Japan	Team Men's Foil	2nd

=== World Championship ===
Year	Location	Event	Position
2014	Kazan, Russia	Individual Men's Foil	3rd
2018	Wuxi, China	Team Men's Foil	3rd

=== European Championship ===
Year	Location	Event	Position
2014	Strasbourg, France	Team Men's Foil	3rd
2016	Toruń, Poland	Individual Men's Foil	1st
2016	Toruń, Poland	Team Men's Foil	1st
2017	(Georgia (country)) Tbilisi, Georgia	Individual Men's Foil	2nd
2017	(Georgia (country)) Tbilisi, Georgia	Team Men's Foil	2nd
2018	Novi Sad, Serbia	Team Men's Foil	1st

=== Grand Prix ===
Year	Location	Event	Position
03/17/2017	(United States) Long Beach, California	Individual Men's Foil	1st
12/01/2017	Turin, Italy	Individual Men's Foil	2nd
05/19/2018	Shanghai, China	Individual Men's Foil	2nd
05/17/2019	Shanghai, China	Individual Men's Foil	3rd

=== World Cup ===
Year	Location	Event	Position
10/16/2015	(United States) San Jose, California	Individual Men's Foil	1st
01/20/2017	Paris, France	Individual Men's Foil	2nd
02/10/2017	Bonn, Germany	Individual Men's Foil	3rd
05/05/2017	St. Petersburg, Russia	Individual Men's Foil	3rd
