= Men's team foil at the 2014 World Fencing Championships =

The Men's team foil event of the 2014 World Fencing Championships was held from 21–22 July 2014.

== Medalists ==
Gold	France; Enzo Lefort; Erwann Le Péchoux; Julien Mertine; Vincent Simon
Silver	China; Chen Haiwei; Lei Sheng; Ma Jianfei; Shi Jialuo
Bronze	Italy; Valerio Aspromonte; Giorgio Avola; Andrea Baldini; Andrea Cassarà

== Draw ==
=== Finals ===
Final
China	25
France	45

Third place
Italy	45
Russia	29

=== Top half ===
Round of 32
Czech Republic	26
Brazil	45
Poland	45
Chile	29
Thailand	21
Great Britain	45
Venezuela	36
Egypt	45
Canada	30
Belarus	45

Round of 16
Italy	45
Brazil	28
Poland	42
Great Britain	45
China	45
Egypt	23
Belarus	31
United States	45

Quarterfinals
Italy	45
Great Britain	32
China	45
United States	41

Semifinals
Italy	39
China	45

=== Bottom half ===
Round of 32
Mexico	43
Austria	42
Ukraine	45
Kazakhstan	28
Germany	45
Israel	38
Turkey	15
Japan	45
Hong Kong	45
Hungary	27

Round of 16
Russia	45
Mexico	24
Ukraine	29
South Korea	45
Germany	45
Japan	41
Hong Kong	36
France	45

Quarterfinals
Russia	45
South Korea	43
Germany	42
France	45

Semifinals
Russia	40
France	45

=== Placement rounds ===
==== 5–8th place ====
5–8th place semifinals
Great Britain	40
United States	45
South Korea	45
Germany	42

5th place
United States	45
South Korea	31
7th place
Great Britain	38
Germany	45

==== 9–16th place ====
9–16th place quarterfinals
Brazil	41
Poland	45
Egypt	45
Belarus	32
Mexico	45
Ukraine	35
Japan	45
Hong Kong	41

9–12th place semifinals
Poland	45
Egypt	39
Mexico	30
Japan	45

9th place
Poland	43
Japan	45
11th place
Egypt	45
Mexico	29

==== 13–16th place ====
13–16th place semifinals
Brazil	34
Belarus	45
Ukraine	45
Hong Kong	35

13th place
Belarus	41
Ukraine	45
15th place
Brazil	45
Hong Kong	42

== Final classification ==
Rank	Nation
1st place, gold medalist(s)	France
2nd place, silver medalist(s)	China
3rd place, bronze medalist(s)	Italy
4	Russia
5	United States
6	South Korea
7	Germany
8	Great Britain
9	Japan
10	Poland
11	Egypt
12	Mexico
13	Ukraine
14	Belarus
15	Brazil
16	Hong Kong
17	Canada
18	Austria
19	Czech Republic
20	Hungary
21	Venezuela
22	Kazakhstan
23	Turkey
24	Chile
25	Thailand
26	Israel
