= Shi Jialuo =

Chinese fencer (born 1993)

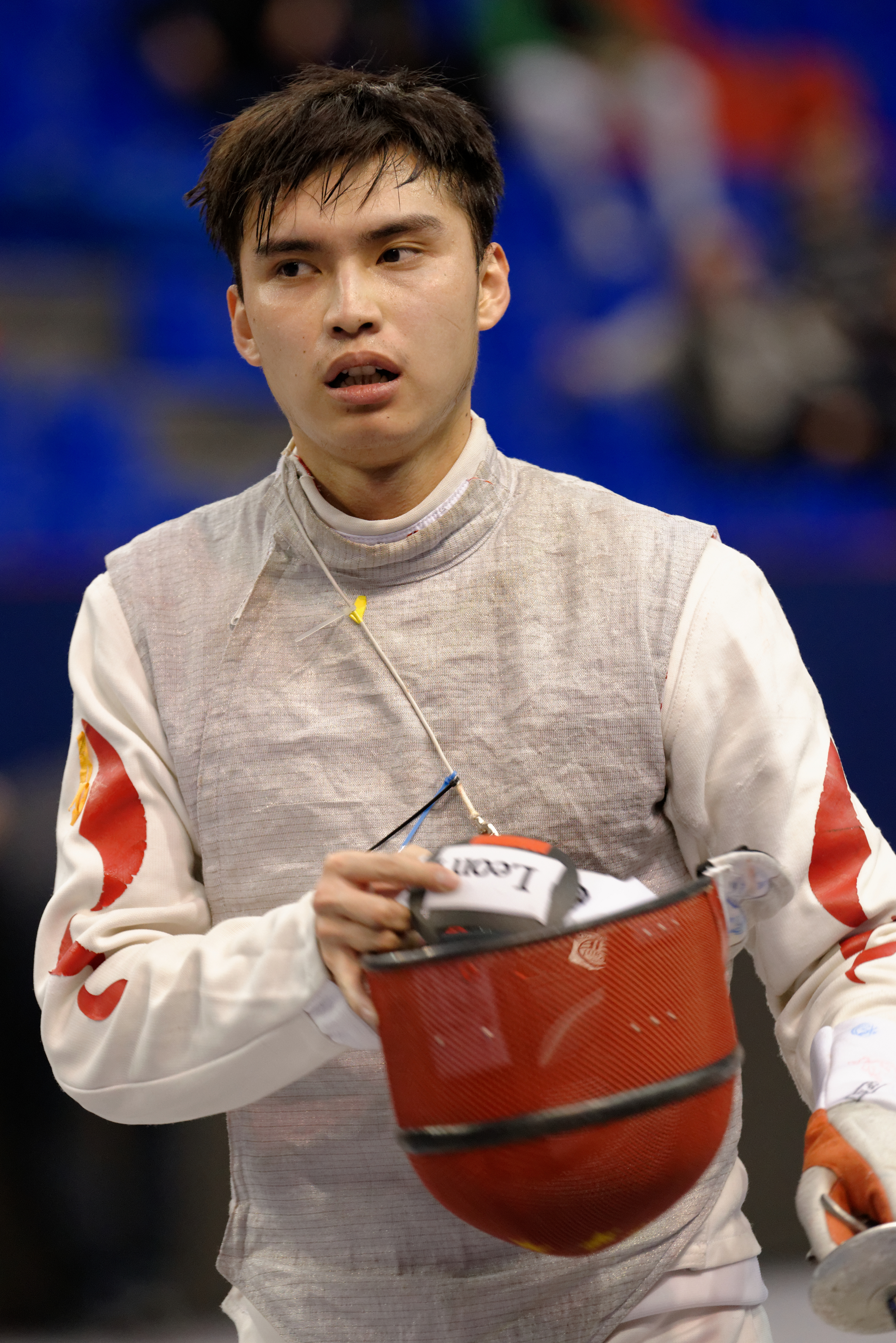

Personal information
- Born: 25 January 1993 (age 33)

Fencing career
- Sport: Fencing
- Country: China
- Weapon: foil
- Hand: left-handed
- National coach: Wang Haibin
- Club: Fujian Province
- FIE ranking: current ranking
Medal record
Men's foil
Representing China
World Championships
| Silver medal – second place | 2014 Kazan | Team |
Asian Championships
| Bronze medal – third place | 2013 Shanghai | Team |

Shi Jialuo (în Chinese: 施嘉洛, born 25 January 1993) is a Chinese foil fencer.

== Career ==
At the age of 16, Shi reached the quarter-finals at the 2009 World Championships in Antalya after defeating Olympic champions Brice Guyart and Benjamin Kleibrink, but lost to Russia's Artem Sedov. In 2011, he made the quarter-finals in the Shanghai Grand Prix, which placed him 36th place in world rankings, a career best as of 2015. He won a bronze medal in the 2012 World Military Fencing Championships in Rio de Janeiro.

Shi was part of the China team that win a bronze medal at the 2013 Asian Championships. With Chen Haiwei, Lei Sheng, and Ma Jianfei he reached the final in the team event of the 2014 World Championships, but they were overcome 25–45 by France and were awarded the silver medal.
