= Ma Jianfei =

Chinese fencer (born 1984)

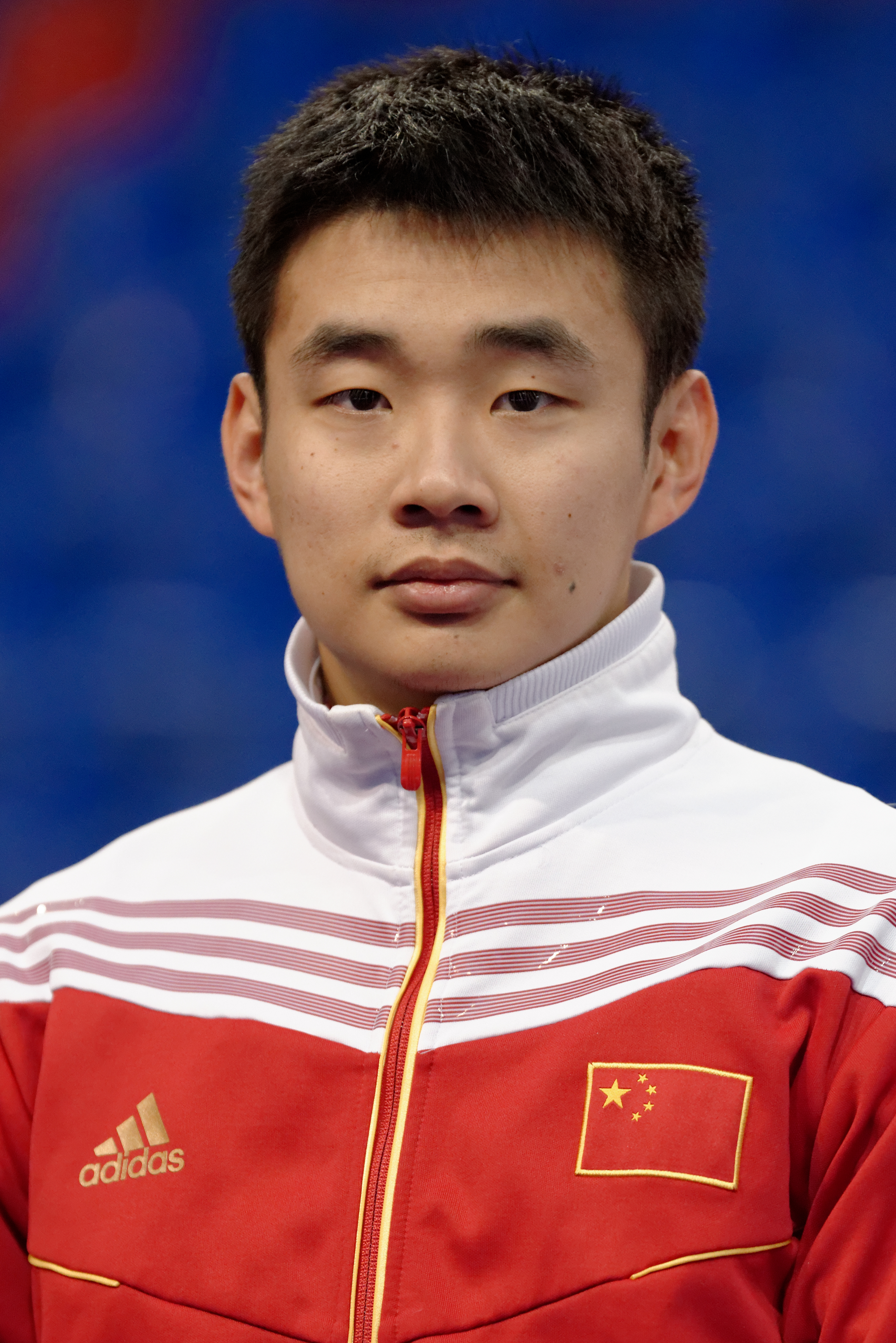
- Ma at the 2015 Paris World Cup

Personal information
- Nationality: Chinese
- Born: 29 July 1984 (age 42) Guangzhou, China
- Height: 1.85 m (6 ft 1 in)
- Weight: 77 kg (170 lb; 12.1 st)

Fencing career
- Sport: Fencing
- Country: China
- Weapon: Foil
- Hand: right-handed
- FIE ranking: current ranking
Medal record
World Championships
Gold medal – first place	2011 Catania	Team
Silver medal – second place	2014 Kazan	Individual
Silver medal – second place	2014 Kazan	Team
Bronze medal – third place	2015 Moscow	Team
Asian Games
Gold medal – first place	2014 Incheon	Individual
Silver medal – second place	2014 Incheon	Team

Ma Jianfei (Chinese: 马剑飞, born 29 July 1984) is a Chinese fencer, silver medallist in the 2014 World Fencing Championships at Kazan and team silver medallist in the 2011 World Fencing Championships at Catania. He won the 2013–14 Fencing World Cup. He went to Ludixi Primary School (荻西小学), in Liwan District of Guangzhou. He also took part in the school sports meeting on December 11, 2016.

== Career ==
In 2012, Ma made the podium three times in the Fencing World Cup, including a gold medal in the Prince Takamado World Cup. At the 2012 Summer Olympics he competed in the Men's foil, but was defeated in the quarter-finals by Korea's Choi Byung-chul, who eventually earned a bronze medal. Ma finished the 2012–13 season third in world rankings.

In the 2013–14 season, Ma won the Ciudad de A Coruña World Cup and the Venice Grand Prix. He also earned a silver medal in the Löwe von Bonn World Cup and a bronze medal in the Prince Takamado World Cup. These results pushed him to the first place of the world rankings in May 2014. He was stopped in the quarter-finals at the Asian Championships and came away with no medal. At the World Championships in Kazan he saw off Czech Alexander Choupenitch in the quarter-finals, then had a tight 15–14 win over Russia's Timur Safin. Ma was defeated in the final by another Russian, Aleksey Cheremisinov, and was doomed to a silver medal. In the team event cruised past Egypt, then defeated the top-ranked United States and Italy. They were largely overcome by France in the final and came away with the silver.
