= James Davis (fencer) =

British fencer (born 1991)

James-Andrew Davis
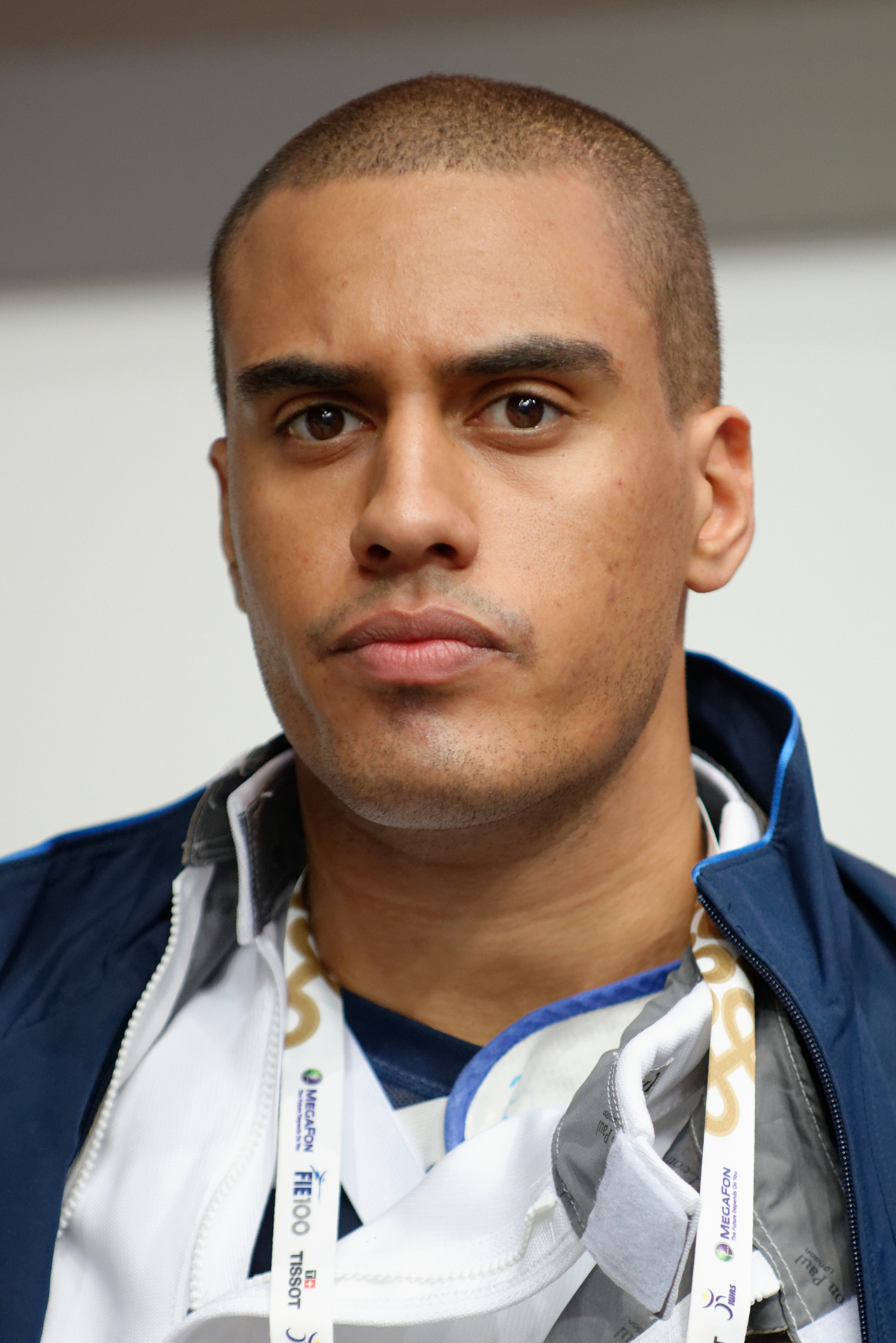
- At the 2013 World Fencing Championships

Personal information
- Born: 3 July 1991 (age 35) Edgware, London
- Home town: Barnet, Hertfordshire
- Height: 1.93 m (6 ft 4 in)
- Weight: 100 kg (220 lb; 15 st 10 lb)

Fencing career
- Sport: Fencing
- Country: Great Britain
- Weapon: foil
- Hand: left-handed
- National coach: Ziemowit Wojciechowski
- Club: ZFW
- FIE ranking: current ranking
Medal record
Men's Foil
Representing Great Britain
European Championships
| Gold medal – first place | 2014 Strasbourg | Foil |
| Bronze medal – third place | 2013 Zagreb | Foil |
| Bronze medal – third place | 2013 Zagreb | Team foil |
| Bronze medal – third place | 2016 Torun | Team foil |

James-Andrew Davis (born 3 July 1991) is a British fencer, European champion in 2014. He competed in men's foil at the 2012 and 2016 Summer Olympics.

== Career ==
Davis was born and brought up in Barnet, North London. He became interested in fencing at the age of four, while waiting for his mother to pick up his brother for his own sport at a Saturday club and fenced at clubs including RLS Fencing and Finchley Foils. In 2008 he became the first Briton to climb a podium at European Cadet Championships with a bronze medal in Rovigo. He claimed another bronze medal, this time with the team, at the 2010 Junior European Championships in Lobnya.

Beginning preparation for the 2012 Summer Olympics on home ground, in London, Davis was ordered by his coach to lose weight or be dropped from Team GB. Davis shed more than 5 stone (32 kg) in 18 months and his fencing improved accordingly: he climbed from No.346 at the end of the 2009–10 season to No.29 on the eve of the Olympics and was allocated one of Great Britain's quota places as hosts. Davis received a bye in the round of 64, but lost 15–10 to five-time World champion Peter Joppich of Germany. In the team event Great Britain knocked off Egypt in the first round, but were defeated 45–40 by Italy, who eventually won the competition, and finished 6th after the placement rounds.

In the 2012–13 season Davis became in Saint-Petersburg the first Briton since 2009 to win a Grand Prix. This result, and three quarter-finals in other World Cup events, pushed him into the world Top 16. At the European Championships in Zagreb he made his way to the semi-finals, where he lost 15–18 to Russia's Aleksey Cheremisinov, and came away with a bronze medal. In the team event, Britain overcame France in the quarter-finals, but fell 45–42 against Poland. They defeated Russia 45–33 to earn Davis a second bronze medal. He finished the season No.7 in world rankings.

At the beginning of the 2013–14 season Davis went to San Francisco to train at the Massialas Foundation with USA national coach Greg Massialas. He achieved two quarter-finals in World Cup events. At the European Championships in Strasbourg he had a close win against young Alexander Choupenitch of the Czech Republic, then overpowered 15–8 Peter Joppich and met Aleksey Cheremisinov in the final. Davis was led 10–6 when the referee interrupted the bout: with temperatures above 35 °C (95 °F), his sweat-drenched jacket was registering false positives. Davis was able to refocus after changing his kit and won Britain's first European foil gold. Cheremisinov took his revenge in the team event, where Russia disposed of Britain in the quarter-finals. At the World Championships in Kazan reached the quarter-finals, where he was defeated 15–6 by France's Enzo Lefort. In the team event, Britain were largely overpowered by Italy in the quarter-finals and finished 8th. Davis ended up world No.6, his best ranking so far.

In 2019, he won the foil title at the British Fencing Championships.

Davis studies psychology at Middlesex University. He is also a fencing coach for Ziemowit Wojciechowski's fencing club
