= 2014 World Fencing Championships =

Sports event in Kazan, Russia

- Dates: 15–23 July
- Host city: Kazan, Russia
- Venue: Kazan Tennis Academy
- Nations participating: 102
- Athletes participating: Over 800
- Events: 12

The 2014 World Fencing Championships were held in Kazan, Russia, from 15–23 July.

== Schedule ==
The schedule of the competition.

●	Opening Ceremony	●	Finals	●	Closing Ceremony

July	15	16	17	18	19	20	21	22	23	Total
Ceremonies				●					●	
Foil Individual		Q			2					2
Sabre Individual	Q			2						2
Épée Individual			Q			2				2
Foil Team							Q	2		2
Sabre Team						Q	2			2
Épée team								Q	2	2
Total Gold Medals	0	0	0	2	2	2	2	2	2	12

== Medal summary ==
=== Men's events ===
Event	Gold	Silver	Bronze
Individual épée	Ulrich Robeiri (FRA)	Park Kyoung-doo (KOR)	Gauthier Grumier (FRA); Enrico Garozzo (ITA)
Team épée	France; Gauthier Grumier; Daniel Jerent; Jean-Michel Lucenay; Ulrich Robeiri	South Korea; Jung Jin-sun; Kweon Young-jun; Park Kyoung-doo; Park Sang-young	Switzerland; Peer Borsky; Max Heinzer; Fabian Kauter; Benjamin Steffen
Individual foil	Aleksey Cheremisinov (RUS)	Ma Jianfei (CHN)	Enzo Lefort (FRA); Timur Safin (RUS)
Team foil	France; Enzo Lefort; Erwann Le Péchoux; Julien Mertine; Vincent Simon	China; Chen Haiwei; Lei Sheng; Ma Jianfei; Shi Jialuo	Italy; Valerio Aspromonte; Giorgio Avola; Andrea Baldini; Andrea Cassarà
Individual sabre	Nikolay Kovalev (RUS)	Gu Bon-gil (KOR)	Tiberiu Dolniceanu (ROU); Aleksey Yakimenko (RUS)
Team sabre	Germany; Max Hartung; Nicolas Limbach; Matyas Szabo; Benedikt Wagner	South Korea; Gu Bon-gil; Kim Jung-hwan; Oh Eun-seok; Won Woo-young	Hungary; Tamás Decsi; Csanád Gémesi; András Szatmári; Áron Szilágyi

=== Women's events ===
Event	Gold	Silver	Bronze
Individual épée	Rossella Fiamingo (ITA)	Britta Heidemann (GER)	Yana Shemyakina (UKR); Erika Kirpu (EST)
Team épée	Russia; Tatyana Gudkova; Violetta Kolobova; Lyubov Shutova; Yana Zvereva	Estonia; Julia Beljajeva; Irina Embrich; Erika Kirpu; Kristina Kuusk	Italy; Bianca Del Carretto; Rossella Fiamingo; Francesca Quondamcarlo; Mara Navarria
Individual foil	Arianna Errigo (ITA)	Martina Batini (ITA)	Inès Boubakri (TUN); Valentina Vezzali (ITA)
Team foil	Italy; Martina Batini; Elisa Di Francisca; Arianna Errigo; Valentina Vezzali	Russia; Yuliya Biryukova; Inna Deriglazova; Larisa Korobeynikova; Diana Yakovleva	France; Astrid Guyart; Corinne Maîtrejean; Ysaora Thibus
Individual sabre	Olha Kharlan (UKR)	Mariel Zagunis (USA)	Yana Egorian (RUS); Yekaterina Dyachenko (RUS)
Team sabre	United States; Ibtihaj Muhammad; Anne-Elizabeth Stone; Dagmara Wozniak; Mariel Zagunis	France; Cécilia Berder; Saoussen Boudiaf; Manon Brunet; Charlotte Lembach	Ukraine; Olha Kharlan; Olena Kravatska; Olena Voronina; Olha Zhovnir

=== Medal table ===
* Host nation (Russia)

Rank	Nation	Gold	Silver	Bronze	Total
1	Italy (ITA)	3	1	4	8
1	Russia (RUS)*	3	1	4	8
3	France (FRA)	3	1	3	7
4	Germany (GER)	1	1	0	2
4	United States (USA)	1	1	0	2
6	Ukraine (UKR)	1	0	2	3
7	South Korea (KOR)	0	4	0	4
8	China (CHN)	0	2	0	2
9	Estonia (EST)	0	1	1	2
10	Hungary (HUN)	0	0	1	1
10	Romania (ROU)	0	0	1	1
10	Switzerland (SUI)	0	0	1	1
10	Tunisia (TUN)	0	0	1	1
Totals (13 entries)		12	12	18	42
