= Aleksey Cheremisinov =

Russian fencer (born 1985)

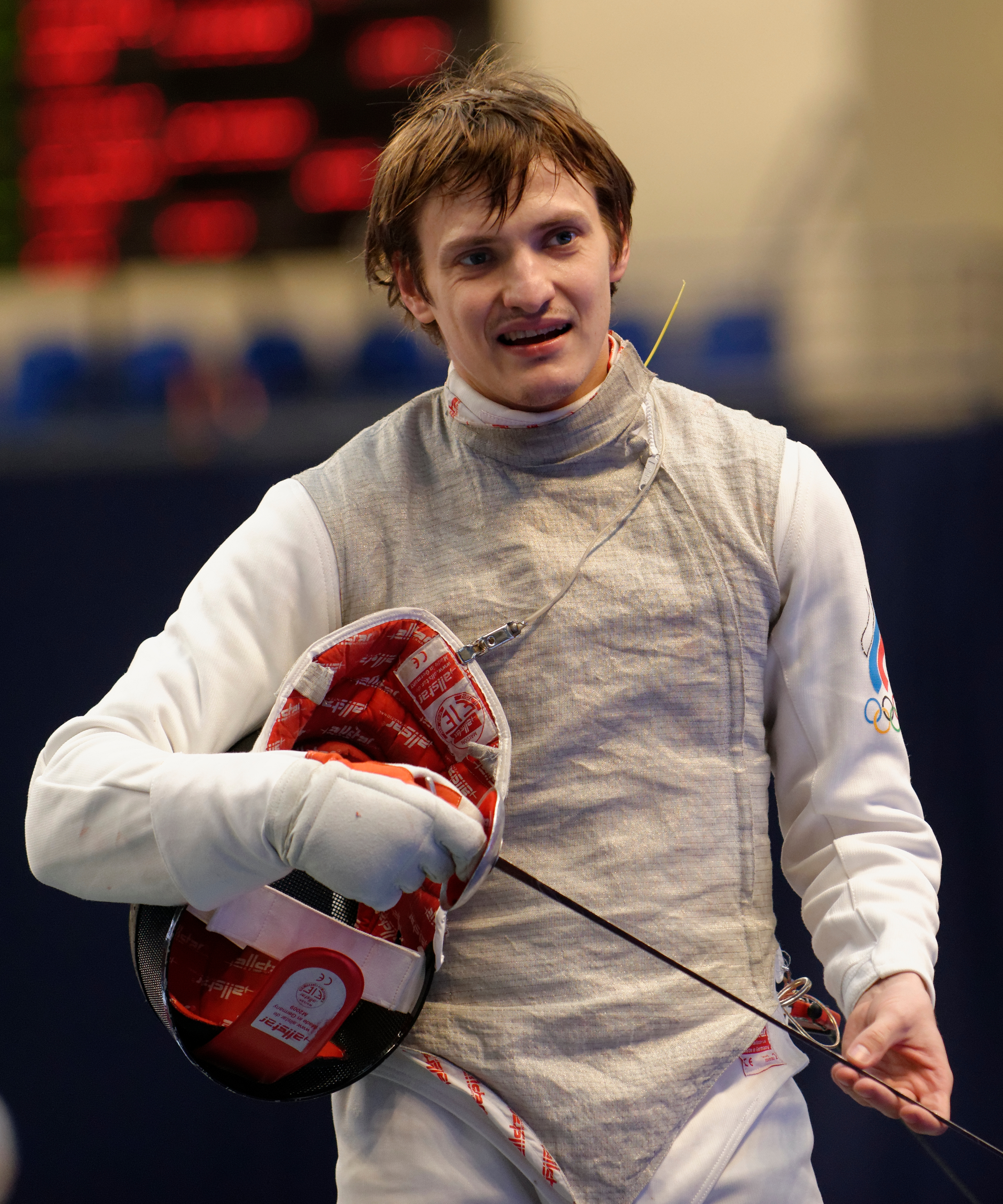
- Cheremisinov at the 2014 Challenge International de Paris

Personal information
- Full name: Aleksey Borisovich Cheremisinov
- Born: 9 July 1985 (age 41) Moscow, Russian SFSR, Soviet Union
- Height: 1.82 m (6 ft 0 in)
- Weight: 72 kg (159 lb)

Fencing career
- Sport: Fencing
- Country: Russia
- Weapon: Foil
- Hand: Right-handed
- National coach: Stefano Cerioni
- Club: Central Sports Army Club [RUS]; MGFSO [RUS]
- Former coach: Dmitriy Shevchenko
- FIE ranking: current ranking

Aleksey Borisovich Cheremisinov (Russian: Алексей Борисович Черемисинов; born 9 July 1985) is a Russian right-handed foil fencer, two-time team European champion, two-time individual European champion, 2014 individual world champion, two-time Olympian, and 2016 team Olympic champion. His clubs are the Central Sports Army Club, and the MGFSO.

== Career ==
Cheremisinov took up fencing when he was seven, because there was a fencing hall close to home. His first coach was Lev Koreshkov.

Cheremisinov joined the Russia national team in 2007. He attempted to qualify for the 2008 Summer Olympics, but his defeat in the quarter-finals of the Lisbon qualifying tournament to Romania's Virgil Sălișcan ended his hopes.

At the 2012 Summer Olympics he was defeated by Italy's Andrea Baldini in the quarter-finals of the individual event. In the team event Russia fenced Germany in the first round. Cheremisinov entered the last relay with a three-hit advantage, but he could not hold the lead against Peter Joppich and Russia were defeated 40–44.

He won gold in the team event in the 2016 Summer Olympics in Rio de Janeiro, Brazil.

== Medal record ==
=== Olympic Games ===
Year	Location	Event	Position
2016	Rio de Janeiro, Brazil	Team Men's Foil	1st

=== World Championship ===
Year	Location	Event	Position
2014	Kazan, Russia	Individual Men's Foil	1st
2015	Moscow, Russia	Team Men's Foil	2nd
2018	Wuxi, China	Team Men's Foil	3rd

=== European Championship ===
Year	Location	Event	Position
2007	Ghent, Belgium	Team Men's Foil	2nd
2008	Kyiv, Ukraine	Team Men's Foil	2nd
2010	Leipzig, Germany	Team Men's Foil	2nd
2011	Sheffield, United Kingdom	Individual Men's Foil	3rd
2011	Sheffield, United Kingdom	Team Men's Foil	3rd
2012	Legnano, Italy	Individual Men's Foil	1st
2013	Zagreb, Croatia	Individual Men's Foil	2nd
2014	Strasbourg, France	Individual Men's Foil	2nd
2014	Strasbourg, France	Team Men's Foil	3rd
2015	Montreux, Switzerland	Team Men's Foil	2nd
2016	Toruń, Poland	Team Men's Foil	1st
2017	(Georgia (country)) Tbilisi, Georgia	Team Men's Foil	2nd
2018	Novi Sad, Serbia	Individual Men's Foil	1st
2018	Novi Sad, Serbia	Team Men's Foil	1st
2019	Düsseldorf, Germany	Individual Men's Foil	3rd

=== Grand Prix ===
Date	Location	Event	Position
03/05/2011	Venice, Italy	Individual Men's Foil	3rd
05/04/2013	Tokyo, Japan	Individual Men's Foil	1st
11/28/2014	Turin, Italy	Individual Men's Foil	1st

=== World Cup ===
Year	Location	Event	Position
05/19/2007	Tokyo, Japan	Individual Men's Foil	1st
03/14/2009	Espinho, Portugal	Individual Men's Foil	1st
03/22/2013	Bonn, Germany	Individual Men's Foil	3rd
03/21/2014	Bonn, Germany	Individual Men's Foil	2nd
05/23/2014	Havana, Cuba	Individual Men's Foil	3rd
02/09/2018	Bonn, Germany	Individual Men's Foil	1st
05/04/2018	St. Petersburg, Russia	Individual Men's Foil	3rd
12/13/2019	Tokyo, Japan	Individual Men's Foil	3rd
01/10/2020	Paris, France	Individual Men's Foil	3rd
