= Men's foil at the 2011 World Fencing Championships =

The Men's foil event of the 2011 World Fencing Championships took place on October 13, 2011.

== Medalists ==
Gold	Andrea Cassarà (ITA)
Silver	Valerio Aspromonte (ITA)
Bronze	Giorgio Avola (ITA)
Bronze	Victor Sintès (FRA)

== Draw ==
=== Finals ===
Semi-finals
(Italy) Valerio Aspromonte	14
(Italy) Giorgio Avola	13
(France) Victor Sintès	5
(Italy) Andrea Cassarà	15

Final
(Italy) Valerio Aspromonte	14
(Italy) Andrea Cassarà	15

=== Top half ===
==== Section 1 ====
Round of 64
(China) Lei Sheng	15
(Ukraine) Volodymyr Koltygo	5
(South Korea) Jeong Chang-young	13
(Germany) Benjamin Kleibrink	14
(Austria) Tobias Hinterseer	15
(South Korea) Heo Jun	13
(China) Huang Liangcai	11
(Italy) Valerio Aspromonte	15
(Russia) Aleksey Cheremisinov	15
(France) Brice Guyart	6
(Canada) Étienne Lalonde Turbide	15
(France) Marcel Marcilloux	11
(Ukraine) Rostyslav Hertsyk	15
(Poland) Marcin Zawada	7
(Czech Republic) Alexander Choupenitch	9
(Japan) Yuki Ota	15

Round of 32
(China) Lei Sheng	15
(Germany) Benjamin Kleibrink	10
(Austria) Tobias Hinterseer	11
(Italy) Valerio Aspromonte	15
(Russia) Aleksey Cheremisinov	15
(Canada) Étienne Lalonde Turbide	9
(Ukraine) Rostyslav Hertsyk	14
(Japan) Yuki Ota	15

Round of 16
(China) Lei Sheng	12
(Italy) Valerio Aspromonte	15
(Russia) Aleksey Cheremisinov	15
(Japan) Yuki Ota	14

Quarterfinals
(Italy) Valerio Aspromonte	15
(Russia) Aleksey Cheremisinov	12

==== Section 2 ====
Round of 64
(Italy) Andrea Baldini	15
(Hong Kong) Chu Wing Hong	9
(Israel) Tomer Or	12
(Japan) Kenta Chida	13
(United Kingdom) Richard Kruse	5
(Poland) Paweł Kawiecki	15
(Israel) Maor Hatoel	12
(South Korea) Choi Byung-chul	15
(South Korea) Kwon Young-ho	14
(Japan) Suguru Awaji	13
(Germany) Sebastian Bachmann	15
(United Kingdom) Laurence Halsted	8
(Germany) Andre Wessels	15
(Japan) Ryo Miyake	11
(Canada) Nicolas Teisseire	4
(Italy) Giorgio Avola	15

Round of 32
(Italy) Andrea Baldini	13
(Japan) Kenta Chida	14
(Poland) Paweł Kawiecki	9
(South Korea) Choi Byung-chul	15
(South Korea) Kwon Young-ho	11
(Germany) Sebastian Bachmann	15
(Germany) Andre Wessels	10
(Italy) Giorgio Avola	14

Round of 16
(Japan) Kenta Chida	13
(South Korea) Choi Byung-chul	15
(Germany) Sebastian Bachmann	10
(Italy) Giorgio Avola	15

Quarterfinals
(South Korea) Choi Byung-chul	11
(Italy) Giorgio Avola	15

=== Bottom half ===
==== Section 3 ====
Round of 64
(Germany) Peter Joppich	15
(Tunisia) Mohamed Samandi	3
(Hong Kong) Choi Nicholas Edward	9
(China) Zhang Liangliang	15
(United States) Race Imboden	15
(Croatia) Bojan Jovanović	8
(Poland) Leszek Rajski	15
(United States) Miles Chamley-Watson	11
(United States) Gerek Meinhardt	15
(Belarus) Siarhei Byk	3
(Portugal) Gael Santos	11
(Russia) Dmitry Rigin	15
(Poland) Radosław Glonek	13
(Greece) Nikolao Kontochristopulos	15
(Netherlands) Sebastiaan Borst	6
(France) Victor Sintès	15

Round of 32
(Germany) Peter Joppich	15
(China) Zhang Liangliang	9
(United States) Race Imboden	15
(Poland) Leszek Rajski	7
(United States) Gerek Meinhardt	15
(Russia) Dmitry Rigin	11
(Greece) Nikolao Kontochristopulos	12
(France) Victor Sintès	15

Round of 16
(Germany) Peter Joppich	14
(United States) Race Imboden	15
(United States) Gerek Meinhardt	9
(France) Victor Sintès	15

Quarterfinals
(United States) Race Imboden	11
(France) Victor Sintès	15

==== Section 4 ====
Round of 64
(Egypt) Alaa El Sayed	15
(Mexico) Daniel Gomez	4
(Austria) Rene Pranz	11
(United States) Alexander Massialas	15
(Russia) Renal Ganeev	12
(China) Zhu Jun	15
(Hungary) Kristof Szabados	5
(France) Erwann Le Péchoux	15
(Austria) Roland Schlosser	15
(Ukraine) Klod Yunes	7
(Russia) Artem Sedov	5
(Romania) Radu Dărăban	15
(Denmark) Filip Kiil	14
(United Kingdom) Jamie Kenber	15
(Tunisia) Karim Kamoun	1
(Italy) Andrea Cassarà	15

Round of 32
(Egypt) Alaa El Sayed	14
(United States) Alexander Massialas	13
(China) Zhu Jun	11
(France) Erwann Le Péchoux	15
(Austria) Roland Schlosser	15
(Romania) Radu Dărăban	5
(United Kingdom) Jamie Kenber	4
(Italy) Andrea Cassarà	15

Round of 16
(Egypt) Alaa El Sayed	15
(France) Erwann Le Péchoux	6
(Austria) Roland Schlosser	8
(Italy) Andrea Cassarà	15

Quarterfinals
(Egypt) Alaa El Sayed	7
(Italy) Andrea Cassarà	15
