= Fencing at the 2012 Summer Olympics – Qualification =

Qualification will be primarily based on the FIE Official Ranking as of April 2, 2012, with further individual places available at 4 zonal qualifying tournaments. Teams will be composed of 3 fencers. For teams to qualify they must be ranked in the top 16, if a continent is not ranked in the top 16 the next best placed country will take their spot.

== Summary ==
Nation	Men					Women					Total
Nation	Individual			Team		Individual			Team		Total
Nation	Épée	Foil	Sabre	Foil	Sabre	Épée	Foil	Sabre	Épée	Foil	Total
Algeria							1	1			2
Argentina								1			1
Austria		1									1
Azerbaijan								1			1
Belarus			3		X						3
Brazil	1	1	1								3
Bulgaria								1			1
Canada		1	1			1	1	1			5
Chile	1					1					2
China	1	3	3	X	X	3	1	2	X		13
Colombia							1				1
Croatia		1									1
Egypt	1	3	1	X		1	3	1		X	10
Estonia	1										1
France	2	3	1	X		1	3	1		X	11
Great Britain		3	1	X		1	3	2		X	10
Germany	1	3	3	X	X	3	1	1	X		12
Greece								1			1
Hong Kong	1	1	1			1	1	1			6
Hungary	1		1			1	1				4
Indonesia								1			1
Iran			1								1
Italy	1	3	3	X	X	3	3	2	X	X	15
Japan		3		X		1	3	1		X	8
Kazakhstan	2							1			3
Lebanon		1					1				2
Malaysia			1								1
Mexico		1						1			2
Morocco	1	1									2
Netherlands	1										1
Norway	1										1
Poland	1		1			1	3	1		X	7
Romania		1	3		X	3		1	X		8
Russia	1	3	3	X	X	3	3	2	X	X	15
South Korea	2	1	3		X	3	3	2	X	X	14
Senegal	1										1
Switzerland	2					1					3
Chinese Taipei						1					1
Tunisia		1	1			1	1	2			6
Ukraine	1		1			3	1	1	X		7
United States	2	3	3	X	X	3	3	2	X	X	16
Uzbekistan	1										1
Venezuela	2		1			1	1	1			6
Vietnam	1										1
Total: 44 NOCs	30	38	37	9	8	37	38	32	8	9	212

== Qualification timeline ==
Event	Date	Venue
Cut-off FIE Official Ranking	April 2, 2012	–
Zonal Qualifier – Europe	April 21–22, 2012	(Slovakia) Bratislava
Zonal Qualifier – Asia/Oceania	April 20–21, 2012	(Japan) Wakayama
Zonal Qualifier – America	April 20–22, 2012	(Chile) Santiago
Zonal Qualifier – Africa	April 19, 2012	(Morocco) Casablanca

== Qualification ==
=== Men's Individual Épée ===
	Vacancies	Qualified
Top 12 individual AOR	12	Paolo Pizzo (ITA); Fabian Kauter (SUI); Bas Verwijlen (NED); Park Kyoung-doo (KOR); Nikolai Novosjolov (EST); Gauthier Grumier (FRA); Max Heinzer (SUI); Soren Thompson (USA); Géza Imre (HUN); Elmir Alimzhanov (KAZ); Silvio Fernández (VEN); Jung Jin-sun (KOR)
Top 2 individual AOR: Europe	2	Yannick Borel (FRA); Jörg Fiedler (GER)
Top 2 individual AOR: Asia-Oceania	2	Li Guojie (CHN); Dmitriy Alexanin (KAZ)
Top 2 individual AOR: America	2	Rubén Limardo (VEN); Weston Kelsey (USA)
Top 2 individual AOR: Africa	2	Alexandre Bouzaid (SEN); Ayman Mohamed Fayez (EGY)
Zonal tournament: Europe	4	Dmytro Karyuchenko (UKR); Radosław Zawrotniak (POL); Bartosz Piasecki (NOR); Pavel Sukhov (RUS)
Zonal tournament: Asia-Oceania	3	Ruslan Kudayev (UZB); Nguyen Tien Nhat (VIE); Leung Ka Ming (HKG)
Zonal tournament: America	2	Paris Inostroza (CHI); Athos Schwantes (BRA)
Zonal tournament: Africa	1	Abdelkarim El Haouari (MAR)
Host country option	**	
	30	

=== Men's Team Foil ===
	Vacancies	Qualified
Top four in FIE Official Team Ranking	4	Italy (China) (Germany); France
Top team from Europe in positions 5–16	1	Russia
Top team from Asia/Oceania in positions 5–16	1	(Japan)
Top team from America in positions 5–16	1	United States
Top team from Africa in positions 5–16	1	Egypt
Host country option	1	(United Kingdom) Great Britain
	9	

=== Men's Individual Foil ===
	Vacancies	Qualified
Members of qualifying teams	24	
Top 2 individual AOR: Europe	2	Roland Schlosser (AUT); Richard Kruse (GBR)
Top 2 individual AOR: Asia-Oceania	2	Choi Byung-chul (KOR); Nicholas Edward Choi (HKG)
Top 2 individual AOR: America	2	Daniel Gomez (MEX); Étienne Lalonde Turbide (CAN)
Top individual AOR: Africa	1	Mohamed Samandi (TUN)
Zonal tournament: Europe	2	Bojan Jovanović (CRO); Radu Dărăban (ROU)
Zonal tournament: Asia-Oceania	1	Zain Shaito (LIB)
Zonal tournament: America	1	Guilherme Toldo (BRA)
Zonal tournament: Africa	1	Lahoussine Ali (MAR)
Host country option	2	James-Andrew Davis (GBR); Husayn Rosowsky (GBR)
	38	

=== Men's Team Sabre ===
	Vacancies	Qualified
Top four in FIE Official Team Ranking	4	Russia (Germany); Italy; Belarus
Top team from Europe in positions 5–16	1	Romania
Top team from Asia/Oceania in positions 5–16	1	(China)
Top team from America in positions 5–16	1	United States
Top team from Africa in positions 5–16	0	DNQ
Additional Country	1	(South Korea) Korea
Host country option	**	
	8	

- No African country was in the top 16 of the World Rankings.

=== Men's Individual Sabre ===
	Vacancies	Qualified
Members of qualifying teams	24	
Top 2 individual AOR: Europe	2	Áron Szilágyi (HUN); Boladé Apithy (FRA)
Top 2 individual AOR: Asia-Oceania	2	Lam Hin Chung (HKG); Yu Peng Kean (MAS)
Top 2 individual AOR: America	2	Renzo Agresta (BRA); Philippe Beaudry (CAN)
Top individual AOR: Africa	1	Hichem Smandi (TUN)
Zonal tournament: Europe	2	Adam Skrodzki (POL); Dmytro Boyko (UKR)
Zonal tournament: Asia-Oceania	1	Mojtaba Abedini (IRI)
Zonal tournament: America	1	Hernán Jansen (VEN)
Zonal tournament: Africa	1	Mannad Zeid (EGY)
Host country option	1	James Honeybone (GBR)
	37	

=== Women's Team Épée ===
	Vacancies	Qualified
Top four in FIE Official Team Ranking	4	Romania (China); Russia; Italy
Top team from Europe in positions 5–16	1	Ukraine
Top team from Asia/Oceania in positions 5–16	1	(South Korea) Korea
Top team from America in positions 5–16	1	United States
Top team from Africa in positions 5–16	0	DNQ
Additional Country	1	(Germany)
Host country option	**	
	8	

- No African country was in the top 16 of the World Rankings.

=== Women's Individual Épée ===
	Vacancies	Qualified
Members of qualifying teams	24	
Top 2 individual AOR: Asia-Oceania	2	Yeung Chui Ling (HKG); Hsu Jo-ting (TPE)
Top 2 individual AOR: Europe	2	Tiffany Géroudet (SUI); Magdalena Piekarska (POL)
Top 2 individual AOR: America	2	Sherraine Schalm (CAN); Cáterin Bravo Aránguiz (CHI)
Top individual AOR: Africa	1	Sarra Besbes (TUN)
Zonal tournament: Europe	2	Emese Szász (HUN); Laura Flessel-Colovic (FRA)
Zonal tournament: Asia-Oceania	1	Nozomi Nakano (JPN)
Zonal tournament: America	1	Maria Martinez (VEN)
Zonal tournament: Africa	1	Mona Hassanein (EGY)
Host country option	1	Corinna Lawrence (GBR)
	37	

=== Women's Team Foil ===
	Vacancies	Qualified
Top four in FIE Official Team Ranking	4	Italy; Russia (South Korea) Korea; Poland
Top team from Europe in positions 5–16	1	France
Top team from Asia/Oceania in positions 5–16	1	(Japan)
Top team from America in positions 5–16	1	United States
Top team from Africa in positions 5–16	1	Egypt
Host country option	1	(United Kingdom) Great Britain
	9	

=== Women's Individual Foil ===
	Vacancies	Qualified
Members of qualifying teams	24	
Top 2 individual AOR: Europe	2	Aida Mohamed (HUN); Carolin Golubytskyi (GER)
Top 2 individual AOR: Asia-Oceania	2	Chen Jinyan (CHN); Lin Po Heung (HKG)
Top 2 individual AOR: America	2	Monica Peterson (CAN); Saskia Loretta van Erven Garcia (COL)
Top individual AOR: Africa	1	Inès Boubakri (TUN)
Zonal tournament: Europe	2	Natalia Sheppard (GBR); Olha Leleiko (UKR)
Zonal tournament: Asia-Oceania	1	Mona Shaito (LIB)
Zonal tournament: America	1	Johana Fuenmayor (VEN)
Zonal tournament: Africa	1	Anissa Khelfaoui (ALG)
Host country option	2	Sophie Troiano (GBR); Anna Bentley (GBR)
	38	

=== Women's Individual Sabre ===
	Vacancies	Qualified
Top 12 individual AOR	12	Sofiya Velikaya (RUS); Mariel Zagunis (USA); Olha Kharlan (UKR); Yuliya Gavrilova (RUS); Min Zhu (CHN); Kim Ji-yeon (KOR); Chen Xiaodong (CHN); Azza Besbes (TUN); Vassiliki Vougiouka (GRE); Irene Vecchi (ITA); Gioia Marzocca (ITA); Dagmara Wozniak (USA)
Top 2 individual AOR: Europe	2	Aleksandra Socha (POL); Léonore Perrus (FRA)
Top 2 individual AOR: Asia-Oceania	2	Lee Ra-jin (KOR); Seira Nakayama (JPN)
Top 2 individual AOR: America	2	Sandra Sassine (CAN); María Belén Pérez Maurice (ARG)
Top 2 individual AOR: Africa	2	Amira Ben Chaabane (TUN); Salma Mahran (EGY)
Zonal tournament: Europe	4	Sabina Mikina (AZE); Margarita Tschomakova (BUL); Alexandra Bujdoso (GER); Bianca Pascu (ROU)
Zonal tournament: Asia-Oceania	3	Yuliya Zhivitsa (KAZ); Au Sin Ying (HKG); Diah Permatasari (INA)
Zonal tournament: America	2	Alejandra Benítez (VEN); Úrsula González (MEX)
Zonal tournament: Africa	1	Lea Moutoussamy (ALG)
Host country option	2	Louise Bond-Williams (GBR); Sophie Williams (GBR)
	32	

** Up to 8 fencers spread across any team or individual events, additional to any qualifiers
