= 2011 European Fencing Championships =

Fencing championship

The 2011 European Fencing Championships was the 24th edition and was held in Sheffield, United Kingdom. The event took place from July 13–19, 2011.

== Schedule ==
●	Opening Ceremony	●	Finals	●	Closing Ceremony

July	14	15	16	17	18	19	Total
Ceremonies	●					●	
Foil Individual	Men	Women					2
Sabre Individual	Women		Men				2
Épée Individual		Men	Women				2
Foil Team				Men	Women		2
Sabre Team				Women		Men	2
Épée team					Men	Women	2
Total Gold Medals	2	2	2	2	2	2	12

== Medal summary ==
=== Men's events ===
Event	Gold	Silver	Bronze
Foil	Giorgio Avola (ITA)	Andrea Cassarà (ITA)	Andrea Baldini (ITA); Aleksey Cheremisinov (RUS)
Épée	Jörg Fiedler (GER)	Bas Verwijlen (NED)	Max Heinzer (SUI); Tomasz Motyka (POL)
Sabre	Aleksey Yakimenko (RUS)	Boladé Apithy (FRA)	Max Hartung (GER); Áron Szilágyi (HUN)
Team Foil	Italy	France	Russia
Team Épée	France	Hungary	Russia
Team Sabre	Italy	Germany	Russia

=== Women's events ===
Event	Gold	Silver	Bronze
Sabre	Olha Kharlan (UKR)	Aleksandra Socha (POL)	Yuliya Gavrilova (RUS); Galyna Pundyk (UKR)
Foil	Elisa Di Francisca (ITA)	Valentina Vezzali (ITA)	Edina Knapek (HUN); Yevgeniya Lamonova (RUS)
Épée	Tiffany Géroudet (SUI)	Britta Heidemann (GER)	Ana Maria Brânză (ROU); Nathalie Moellhausen (ITA)
Team Sabre	Italy	Ukraine	Russia
Team Foil	Italy	Russia	Germany
Team Épée	Romania	Russia	France

== Medal table ==
Rank	Nation	Gold	Silver	Bronze	Total
1	Italy (ITA)	6	2	2	10
2	Russia (RUS)	1	2	7	10
3	Germany (GER)	1	2	2	5
4	France (FRA)	1	2	1	4
5	Ukraine (UKR)	1	1	1	3
6	Romania (ROU)	1	0	1	2
6	Switzerland (SUI)	1	0	1	2
8	Hungary (HUN)	0	1	2	3
9	Poland (POL)	0	1	1	2
10	Netherlands (NED)	0	1	0	1
Totals (10 entries)		12	12	18	42

== Results overview ==
=== Men ===
==== Foil individual ====
Position	Name	Country
1st place, gold medalist(s)	Giorgio Avola	Italy
2nd place, silver medalist(s)	Andrea Cassarà	Italy
3rd place, bronze medalist(s)	Andrea Baldini	Italy
3rd place, bronze medalist(s)	Aleksey Cheremisinov	Russia
5.	Bojan Jovanović	Croatia
6.	Sebastian Bachmann	Germany
7.	Rene Pranz	Austria
8.	Sebastian Borst	Netherlands

Quarter-finals
(Netherlands) Sebastian Borst	12
(Russia) Aleksey Cheremisinov	15
(Germany) Sebastian Bachmann	9
(Italy) Giorgio Avola	10
(Italy) Andrea Cassarà	15
(Austria) Rene Pranz	7
(Croatia) Bojan Jovanović	3
(Italy) Andrea Baldini	15

Semi-finals
(Russia) Aleksey Cheremisinov	8
(Italy) Giorgio Avola	15
(Italy) Andrea Cassarà	15
(Italy) Andrea Baldini	11

Final
(Italy) Giorgio Avola	15
(Italy) Andrea Cassarà	14

==== Epée individual ====
Position	Name	Country
1st place, gold medalist(s)	Jörg Fiedler	Germany
2nd place, silver medalist(s)	Bas Verwijlen	Netherlands
3rd place, bronze medalist(s)	Max Heinzer	Switzerland
3rd place, bronze medalist(s)	Tomasz Motyka	Poland
5.	Radosław Zawrotniak	Poland
6.	Matteo Tagliariol	Italy
7.	Arwin Kardolus	Netherlands
8.	Péter Somfai	Hungary

Quarter-finals
(Poland) Tomasz Motyka	15
(Italy) Matteo Tagliariol	13
(Hungary) Péter Somfai	11
(Germany) Jörg Fiedler	15
(Netherlands) Bas Verwijlen	15
(Poland) Radosław Zawrotniak	11
(Switzerland) Max Heinzer	15
(Netherlands) Arwin Kardolus	8

Semi-finals
(Poland) Tomasz Motyka	12
(Germany) Jörg Fiedler	15
(Netherlands) Bas Verwijlen	15
(Switzerland) Max Heinzer	11

Final
(Germany) Jörg Fiedler	15
(Netherlands) Bas Verwijlen	14

==== Sabre individual ====
Position	Name	Country
1st place, gold medalist(s)	Aleksey Yakimenko	Russia
2nd place, silver medalist(s)	Boladé Apithy	France
3rd place, bronze medalist(s)	Max Hartung	Germany
3rd place, bronze medalist(s)	Áron Szilágyi	Hungary
5.	Nicolas Limbach	Germany
6.	Aldo Montano	Italy
7.	Aliaksandr Buikevich	Belarus
8.	Florin Zalomir	Romania

Quarter-finals
(Germany) Max Hartung	15
(Belarus) Aliaksandr Buikevich	10
(Germany) Nicolas Limbach	14
(Russia) Aleksey Yakimenko	15
(Hungary) Áron Szilágyi	15
(Italy) Aldo Montano	14
(Romania) Florin Zalomir	13
(France) Boladé Apithy	15

Semi-finals
(Germany) Max Hartung	10
(Russia) Aleksey Yakimenko	15
(Hungary) Áron Szilágyi	14
(France) Boladé Apithy	15

Final
(Russia) Aleksey Yakimenko	15
(France) Boladé Apithy	14

==== Foil team ====
Position	Name	Country
1st place, gold medalist(s)	Valerio Aspromonte; Giorgio Avola; Andrea Baldini; Andrea Cassarà	Italy
2nd place, silver medalist(s)	Brice Guyart; Erwann Le Péchoux; Marcel Marcilloux; Victor Sintès	France
3rd place, bronze medalist(s)	Aleksey Cheremisinov; Renal Ganeev; Dmitry Rigin; Artem Sedov	Russia
4.	Sebastian Bachmann; Dominic Behr; Peter Joppich; Andre Wessels	Germany
5.	Laurence Halsted; Edward Jefferies; Jamie Kenber; Richard Kruse	United Kingdom
6.	Moritz Hinterseer; Tobias Hinterseer; Rene Pranz; Roland Schlosser	Austria
7.	Tomasz Ciepły; Paweł Kawiecki; Michał Majewski; Leszek Rajski	Poland
8.	Oren Bassal; Maor Hatoel; Yaaqov Or Htuel; Tomer Or	Israel

Quarter-finals
Italy	45
Poland	38
United Kingdom	39
Germany	45
France	45
Austria	43
Israel	27
Russia	45

Semi-finals
Italy	45
Germany	31
France	45
Russia	41

Final
Italy	45
France	28
Third place
Germany	35
Russia	45

==== Epée team ====
Position	Name	Country
1st place, gold medalist(s)	Yannick Borel; Gauthier Grumier; Ronan Gustin; Jean-Michel Lucenay	France
2nd place, silver medalist(s)	Gábor Boczkó; Géza Imre; András Rédli; Péter Somfai	Hungary
3rd place, bronze medalist(s)	Anton Avdeev; Sergey Khodos; Pavel Sukhov; Aleksey Tikhomirov	Russia
4.	Anatoliy Herey; Dmytro Karyuchenko; Vitaly Medvedev; Bohdan Nikishyn	Ukraine
5.	Jörg Fiedler; Stephan Rein; Sven Schmid; Martin Schmitt	Germany
6.	Max Heinzer; Fabian Kauter; Florian Staub; Benjamin Steffen	Switzerland
7.	Luca Ferraris; Enrico Garozzo; Alfredo Rota; Matthew Trager	Italy
8.	Nikolai Novosjolov; Sten Priinits; Jüri Salm	Estonia

Quarter-finals
France	45
Switzerland	34
Ukraine	38
Italy	37
Russia	45
Germany	36
Estonia	38
Hungary	45

Semi-finals
France	45
Ukraine	37
Russia	42
Hungary	45

Final
France	45
Hungary	40
Third place
Ukraine	36
Russia	46

==== Sabre team ====
Position	Name	Country
1st place, gold medalist(s)	Aldo Montano; Diego Occhuizzi; Gianpiero Pastore; Luigi Tarantino	Italy
2nd place, silver medalist(s)	Max Hartung; Björn Hübner; Nicolas Limbach; Benedikt Wagner	Germany
3rd place, bronze medalist(s)	Pavel Bykov; Nikolay Kovalev; Veniamin Reshetnikov; Aleksey Yakimenko	Russia
4.	Tiberiu Dolniceanu; Rareș Dumitrescu; Cosmin Hănceanu; Florin Zalomir	Romania
5.	Aliaksandr Buikevich; Dmitri Lapkes; Valery Pryiemka; Aleksey Romanovitch	Belarus
6.	Tamás Decsi; Balázs Lontai; Zsolt Nemcsik; Áron Szilágyi	Hungary
7.	Dmytro Boyko; Dmytro Pundyk; Oleh Shturbabin; Andriy Yahodka	Ukraine
8.	Fernando Casares; Alvaro Lopez Mendez; Jaime Martí; Pablo Moreno	Spain

Quarter-finals
Italy	45
Hungary	38
Ukraine	35
Romania	45
Germany	45
Belarus	41
Spain	29
Russia	45

Semi-finals
Italy	45
Romania	29
Germany	45
Russia	35

Final
Italy	45
Germany	38
Third place
Romania	36
Russia	45

=== Women ===
==== Sabre individual ====
Position	Name	Country
1st place, gold medalist(s)	Olha Kharlan	Ukraine
2nd place, silver medalist(s)	Aleksandra Socha	Poland
3rd place, bronze medalist(s)	Yuliya Gavrilova	Russia
3rd place, bronze medalist(s)	Halyna Pundyk	Ukraine
5.	Réka Benkó	Hungary
6.	Gioia Marzocca	Italy
7.	Vassiliki Vougiouka	Greece
8.	Léonore Perrus	France

Quarter-finals
(Ukraine) Halyna Pundyk	15
(Greece) Vassiliki Vougiouka	14
(Italy) Gioia Marzocca	14
(Poland) Aleksandra Socha	15
(Hungary) Réka Benkó	6
(Ukraine) Olha Kharlan	15
(France) Léonore Perrus	13
(Russia) Yuliya Gavrilova	15

Semi-finals
(Ukraine) Halyna Pundyk	11
(Poland) Aleksandra Socha	15
(Ukraine) Olha Kharlan	15
(Russia) Yuliya Gavrilova	8

Final
(Poland) Aleksandra Socha	10
(Ukraine) Olha Kharlan	15

==== Foil individual ====
Position	Name	Country
1st place, gold medalist(s)	Elisa Di Francisca	Italy
2nd place, silver medalist(s)	Valentina Vezzali	Italy
3rd place, bronze medalist(s)	Edina Knapek	Hungary
3rd place, bronze medalist(s)	Yevgeniya Lamonova	Russia
5.	Aida Shanaeva	Russia
6.	Aida Mohamed	Hungary
7.	Małgorzata Wojtkowiak	Poland
8.	Ilaria Salvatori	Italy

Quarter-finals
(Russia) Aida Shanaeva	13
(Russia) Yevgeniya Lamonova	15
(Italy) Elisa Di Francisca	15
(Hungary) Aida Mohamed	12
(Hungary) Edina Knapek	15
(Italy) Ilaria Salvatori	13
(Poland) Malgorzata Wojtkowiak	7
(Italy) Valentina Vezzali	15

Semi-finals
(Russia) Yevgeniya Lamonova	12
(Italy) Elisa Di Francisca	13
(Hungary) Edina Knapek	4
(Italy) Valentina Vezzali	12

Final
(Italy) Elisa Di Francisca	10
(Italy) Valentina Vezzali	8

==== Epée individual ====
Position	Name	Country
1st place, gold medalist(s)	Tiffany Géroudet	Switzerland
2nd place, silver medalist(s)	Britta Heidemann	Germany
3rd place, bronze medalist(s)	Ana Maria Brânză	Romania
3rd place, bronze medalist(s)	Nathalie Moellhausen	Italy
5.	Małgorzata Stroka	Poland
6.	Bianca Del Carretto	Italy
7.	Laura Flessel-Colovic	France
8.	Rossella Fiamingo	Italy

Quarter-finals
(Romania) Ana Maria Brânză	15
(Italy) Bianca Del Carretto	14
(Poland) Malgorzata Stroka	9
(Germany) Britta Heidemann	10
(Italy) Nathalie Moellhausen	15
(Italy) Rossella Fiamingo	12
(France) Laura Flessel-Colovic	14
(Switzerland) Tiffany Géroudet	15

Semi-finals
(Romania) Ana Maria Brânză	10
(Germany) Britta Heidemann	15
(Italy) Nathalie Moellhausen	13
(Switzerland) Tiffany Géroudet	15

Final
(Germany) Britta Heidemann	8
(Switzerland) Tiffany Géroudet	9

==== Sabre team ====
Position	Name	Country
1st place, gold medalist(s)	Ilaria Bianco; Paola Guarneri; Gioia Marzocca; Irene Vecchi	Italy
2nd place, silver medalist(s)	Olha Kharlan; Olena Khomrova; Halyna Pundyk; Olha Zhovnir	Ukraine
3rd place, bronze medalist(s)	Yekaterina Dyachenko; Dina Galiakbarova; Yuliya Gavrilova; Sofiya Velikaya	Russia
4.	Cécilia Berder; Léonore Perrus; Marion Stoltz; Carole Vergne	France
5.	Bogna Jozwiak; Katarzyna Kedziora; Aleksandra Socha; Irena Wieckowska	Poland
6.	Alexandra Bujdoso; Stefanie Kubissa; Anna Limbach; Anja Musch	Germany
7.	Sandra Marcos; Lucia Martin-Português; Araceli Navarro; Laia Vila	Spain
8.	Aida Alasgarova; Sevil Bunyatova; Sevinj Bunyatova; Sabina Mikina	Azerbaijan

Quarter-finals
Russia	45
Spain	29
Poland	35
Italy	45
France	45
Azerbaijan	41
Germany	33
Ukraine	45

Semi-finals
Russia	32
Italy	45
France	36
Ukraine	45

Final
Italy	45
Ukraine	43
Third place
Russia	45
France	26

==== Foil team ====
Position	Name	Country
1st place, gold medalist(s)	Elisa Di Francisca; Arianna Errigo; Ilaria Salvatori; Valentina Vezzali	Italy
2nd place, silver medalist(s)	Inna Deriglazova; Larisa Korobeynikova; Yevgeniya Lamonova; Aida Shanaeva	Russia
3rd place, bronze medalist(s)	Sandra Bingenheimer; Carolin Golubytskyi; Anja Schache; Katja Wächter	Germany
4.	Edina Knapek; Fanny Kreiss; Aida Mohamed; Gabriella Varga	Hungary
5.	Gaëlle Gebet; Astrid Guyart; Corinne Maîtrejean; Virginie Ujlaky	France
6.	Sylwia Gruchała; Magdalena Knop; Anna Rybicka; Martyna Synoradzka	Poland
7.	Kateryna Chentsova; Olena Khismatulina; Olha Leleiko; Anastasiya Moskovska	Ukraine
8.	Claire Bennett; Anna Bentley; Martina Emanuel; Natalia Sheppard	United Kingdom

Quarter-finals
Italy	39
United Kingdom	34
France	32
Germany	36
Poland	40
Hungary	45
Ukraine	27
Russia	39

Semi-finals
Italy	45
Germany	24
Hungary	22
Russia	45

Final
Italy	45
Russia	43
Third place
Germany	45
Hungary	38

==== Epée team ====
Position	Name	Country
1st place, gold medalist(s)	Simona Alexandru; Ana Maria Brânză; Loredana Iordăchioiu; Anca Măroiu	Romania
2nd place, silver medalist(s)	Violetta Kolobova; Tatiana Logunova; Lyubov Shutova; Anna Sivkova	Russia
3rd place, bronze medalist(s)	Sarah Daninthe; Laura Flessel-Colovic; Joséphine Jacques-André-Coquin; Maureen Nisima	France
4.	Julia Beljajeva; Irina Embrich; Kristina Kuusk; Julia Zuikova	Estonia
5.	Cristiana Cascioli; Bianca Del Carretto; Nathalie Möllhausen; Mara Navarria	Italy
6.	Edina Antal; Edina Bekefi; Dorina Budai; Emese Szász	Hungary
7.	Imke Duplitzer; Britta Heidemann; Ricarda Multerer; Monika Sozanska	Germany
8.	Danuta Dmowska-Andrzejuk; Ewa Nelip; Magdalena Piekarska; Małgorzata Stroka	Poland

Quarter-finals
Romania	43
Hungary	37
France	45
Poland	41
Germany	38
Estonia	45
Russia	45
Italy	32

Semi-finals
Romania	45
France	38
Estonia	42
Russia	45

Final
Romania	45
Russia	31
Third place
France	42
Estonia	41
