= Men's team foil at the 2013 World Fencing Championships =

Sportive event

The Men's team foil event of the 2013 World Fencing Championships was held on August 12, 2013.

== Medalists ==
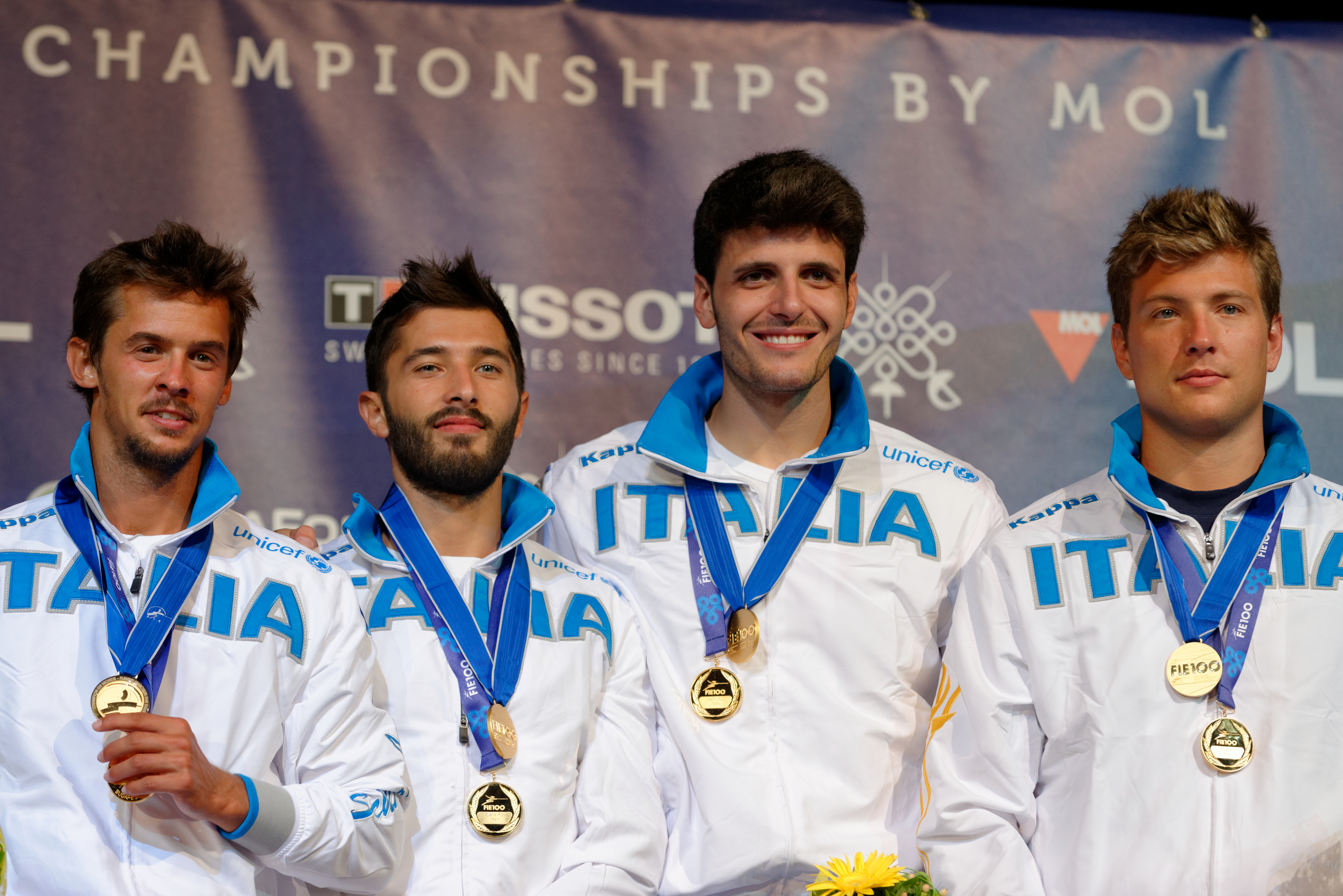
2013 World team champion Italy: from left to right, Andrea Baldini, Giorgio Avola, Andrea Cassarà and Valerio Aspromonte

Gold	Italy; Valerio Aspromonte; Giorgio Avola; Andrea Baldini; Andrea Cassarà
Silver	United States; Miles Chamley-Watson; Race Imboden; Alexander Massialas; Gerek Meinhardt
Bronze	France; Jérémy Cadot; Erwann Le Péchoux; Enzo Lefort; Marcel Marcilloux

== Draw ==
=== Finals ===
Final
1	Italy	45
2	United States	33

Third place
1	Russia	40
2	France	45

=== Top half ===
Round of 32
Czech Republic	45
Hong Kong	27
South Korea	45
Venezuela	24
Kuwait	15
United Kingdom	45
Singapore	27
Ukraine	45
Brazil	23
Hungary	45

Round of 16
Italy	45
Czech Republic	26
South Korea	36
United Kingdom	45
Japan	36
Ukraine	45
Hungary	26
Russia	45

Quarterfinals
Italy	45
United Kingdom	33
Ukraine	22
Russia	45

Semifinals
Italy	45
Russia	44

=== Bottom half ===
Round of 32
Mexico	33
Austria	45
Poland	45
Israel	37
China	45
Turkey	21
Denmark	34
Egypt	45
Belarus	31
Canada	45

Round of 16
Germany	45
Austria	34
Poland	35
France	45
China	45
Egypt	32
Canada	25
United States	45

Quarterfinals
Germany	44
France	45
China	35
United States	45

Semifinals
France	35
United States	45

=== Placement rounds ===
==== 5–8th place ====
5–8th place semifinals
United Kingdom	39
Ukraine	45
Germany	45
China	32

5th place
Ukraine	39
Germany	45
7th place
United Kingdom	36
China	45

==== 9–16th place ====
9–16th place quarterfinals
Czech Republic	33
South Korea	45
Japan	45
Hungary	41
Austria	24
Poland	45
Egypt	45
Canada	42

9–13th place semifinals
South Korea	45
Japan	40
Poland	41
Egypt	45

9th place
South Korea	45
Egypt	27
11th place
Japan	35
Poland	45

==== 13–16th place ====
13–16th place semifinals
Czech Republic	45
Hungary	33
Austria	45
Canada	43

13th place
Czech Republic	28
Austria	45
15th place
Hungary	43
Canada	45

== Final classification ==
Rank	Nation
1st place, gold medalist(s)	Italy
2nd place, silver medalist(s)	United States
3rd place, bronze medalist(s)	France
4	Russia
5	Germany
6	Ukraine
7	China
8	United Kingdom
9	South Korea
10	Egypt
11	Poland
12	Japan
13	Austria
14	Czech Republic
15	Canada
16	Hungary
17	Brazil
18	Belarus
19	Hong Kong
20	Mexico
21	Singapore
22	Israel
23	Denmark
24	Venezuela
25	Kuwait
26	Turkey
