= Fencing at the 2015 European Games – Qualification =

A total of 216 qualifying places are available for fencing events at the 2015 European Games. The qualification will be based on the FIE Official Ranking on 30 November 2014 and the Qualifying Competition 20–21 December 2014.

== Qualification timeline ==
Event	Date	Location	Res.
FIE Official Ranking cut off date	30 November 2014	–	
Qualification Tournament	20–21 December 2014	(Hungary) Budapest	

== Qualification summary ==
Nation	Men						Women						Total
Nation	Individual			Team			Individual			Team			Total
Nation	Épée	Foil	Sabre	Épée	Foil	Sabre	Épée	Foil	Sabre	Épée	Foil	Sabre	Total
Austria		1	1				1	1					4
Azerbaijan	4		4	X		X	4		4	X		X	16
Belarus		1	1						1				3
Belgium			1					1	1				3
Bulgaria	1		1										2
Croatia		1						1					2
Czech Republic		1						1	1				3
Denmark	1	1											2
Estonia	1						4			X			5
Finland	1						1						2
France	4	4	1	X	X			4	4		X	X	17
Georgia								1	1				2
Germany		4	4		X	X	1	4	1		X		14
Great Britain		4	1		X		1	1	1				8
Greece		1	1					1	1				4
Hungary	4	1	4	X		X	4	4		X	X		17
Iceland									1				1
Israel	1	1					1	1					4
Italy	4	4	4	X	X	X	4	4	4	X	X	X	24
Latvia	1												1
Luxembourg							1						1
Moldova			1						1				2
Netherlands	1												1
Norway	1												1
Poland	1	4	1		X		1	4	4		X	X	15
Romania		1	4			X	4	1	1	X			11
Russia	4	4	4	X	X	X	4	4	4	X	X	X	24
Serbia							1						1
Slovakia		1					1	1					3
Spain	1		1						1				3
Sweden							1						1
Switzerland	4			X									4
Turkey		1	1					1	1				4
Ukraine	1	1	1				1	1	4			X	9
Total: 34 NOCs	35	36	36	6	6	6	35	36	36	6	6	6	214

== Qualification ==
=== Men's Team Épée ===
	Vacancies	Qualified
Host country option	1	Azerbaijan
Top five in FIE Official Team Ranking	5	France; Switzerland; Italy; Russia; Hungary
	6	

=== Men's Individual Épée ===
	Vacancies	Qualified
Members of qualifying teams	24	Four athletes from each country above
Top eight in FIE Official Individual Ranking	~~8~~ 7	Bohdan Nikishyn (UKR); Nikolai Novosjolov (EST); ~~Jörg Fiedler (GER)~~; Bas Verwijlen (NED); Frederik von der Osten (DEN); Radosław Zawrotniak (POL); Niko Vuorinen (FIN); Ido Herpe (ISR)
Qualification Tournament	4	Mihalis Jefremenko (LAT); José Luis Abajo (ESP); Bartosz Piasecki (NOR); Deyan Dobrev (BUL)
	~~36~~ 35	

=== Men's Team Foil ===
	Vacancies	Qualified
Host country option	0	~~Azerbaijan~~
Top six in FIE Official Team Ranking	6	France; Russia; Italy; Germany; Great Britain; Poland
	6	

=== Men's Individual Foil ===
	Vacancies	Qualified
Members of qualifying teams	24	Four athletes from each country above
Top eight in FIE Official Individual Ranking	8	Alexander Choupenitch (CZE); Klod Yunes (UKR); René Pranz (AUT); Tomer Or (ISR); Alexander Tsoronis (DEN); Siarhei Byk (BLR); András Németh (HUN); Bojan Jovanović (CRO)
Qualification Tournament	~~4~~ 3	Radu Dărăban (ROU); David Végh (SVK); Nikolaos Kontochristopoulos (GRE); ~~Simon Rizell (SWE)~~
Reallocation	1	Tevfik Burak Babaoğlu (TUR)
	36	

=== Men's Team Sabre ===
	Vacancies	Qualified
Host country option	1	Azerbaijan
Top five in FIE Official Team Ranking	5	Germany; Italy; Russia; Romania; Hungary
	6	

=== Men's Individual Sabre ===
	Vacancies	Qualified
Members of qualifying teams	24	Four athletes from each country above
Top eight in FIE Official Individual Ranking	~~8~~ 7	Nicolas Rousset (FRA); ~~Sandro Bazadze (GEO)~~; Andriy Yagodka (UKR); Aliaksandr Buikevich (BLR); Fernando Casares (ESP); Seppe Van Holsbeke (BEL); Adam Skrodzki (POL); James Honeybone (GBR)
Qualification Tournament	4	Mathias Willau (AUT); İbrahim Ahmet Ant (TUR); Georges Tsouroutas (GRE); Atanas Arnaudov (BUL)
Reallocation	1	Piotr Mateisin (MDA)
	36	

=== Women's Team Épée ===
	Vacancies	Qualified
Host country option	1	Azerbaijan
Top five in FIE Official Team Ranking	5	Russia; Estonia; Italy; Romania; Hungary
	6	

=== Women's Individual Épée ===
	Vacancies	Qualified
Members of qualifying teams	24	Four athletes from each country above
Top eight in FIE Official Individual Ranking	~~8~~ 6	Britta Heidemann (GER); Yana Shemyakina (UKR); ~~Marie Florence Candassamy (FRA)~~; ~~Tiffany Géroudet (SUI)~~; Emma Samuelsson (SWE); Ewa Nelip (POL); Corinna Lawrence (GBR); Romana Caran (SRB)
Qualification Tournament	4	Paula Schmidl (AUT); Avital Marinuk (ISR); Dagmar Cipárová (SVK); Lis Fautsch (LUX)
Reallocation	1	Catharina Kock (FIN)
	~~36~~ 35	

=== Women's Team Foil ===
	Vacancies	Qualified
Host country option	0	~~Azerbaijan~~
Top six in FIE Official Team Ranking	6	Italy; Russia; France; Germany; Poland; Hungary
	6	

=== Women's Individual Foil ===
	Vacancies	Qualified
Members of qualifying teams	24	Four athletes from each country above
Top eight in FIE Official Individual Ranking	8	Olga Leleyko (UKR); Natalia Sheppard (GBR); İrem Karamete (TUR); Michala Cellerová (SVK); Maria Boldor (ROU); Andrea Bímová (CZE); Olivia Wohlgemuth (AUT); Delphine Groslambert (BEL)
Qualification Tournament	~~4~~ 3	Delila Hatuel (ISR); Aikaterini Kontochristopoulou (GRE); ~~Ester Schreiber (SWE)~~; Teona Goglidze (GEO)
Reallocation	1	Marcela Dajčić (CRO)
	36	

=== Women's Team Sabre ===
	Vacancies	Qualified
Host country option	1	Azerbaijan
Top five in FIE Official Team Ranking	5	Russia; France; Italy; Ukraine; Poland
	6	

=== Women's Individual Sabre ===
	Vacancies	Qualified
Members of qualifying teams	24	Four athletes from each country above
Top eight in FIE Official Individual Ranking	~~8~~ 7	Vassiliki Vougiouka (GRE); Anna Limbach (GER); ~~Anna Márton (HUN)~~; Laia Vila (ESP); Teodora Kakhiani (GEO); Darya Andreyeva (BLR); Aliya Itzkowitz (GBR); Bianca Pascu (ROU)
Qualification Tournament	4	Aliona Jelachi (MDA); Alexandra Gevaert (BEL); Ilgın Sarban (TUR); Thorbjörg Ágústsdóttir (ISL)
Reallocation	1	Klára Hanžlíková (CZE)
	36	
