= Fencing at the 2012 Summer Olympics – Men's foil =

Men's foil at the Games of the XXX Olympiad
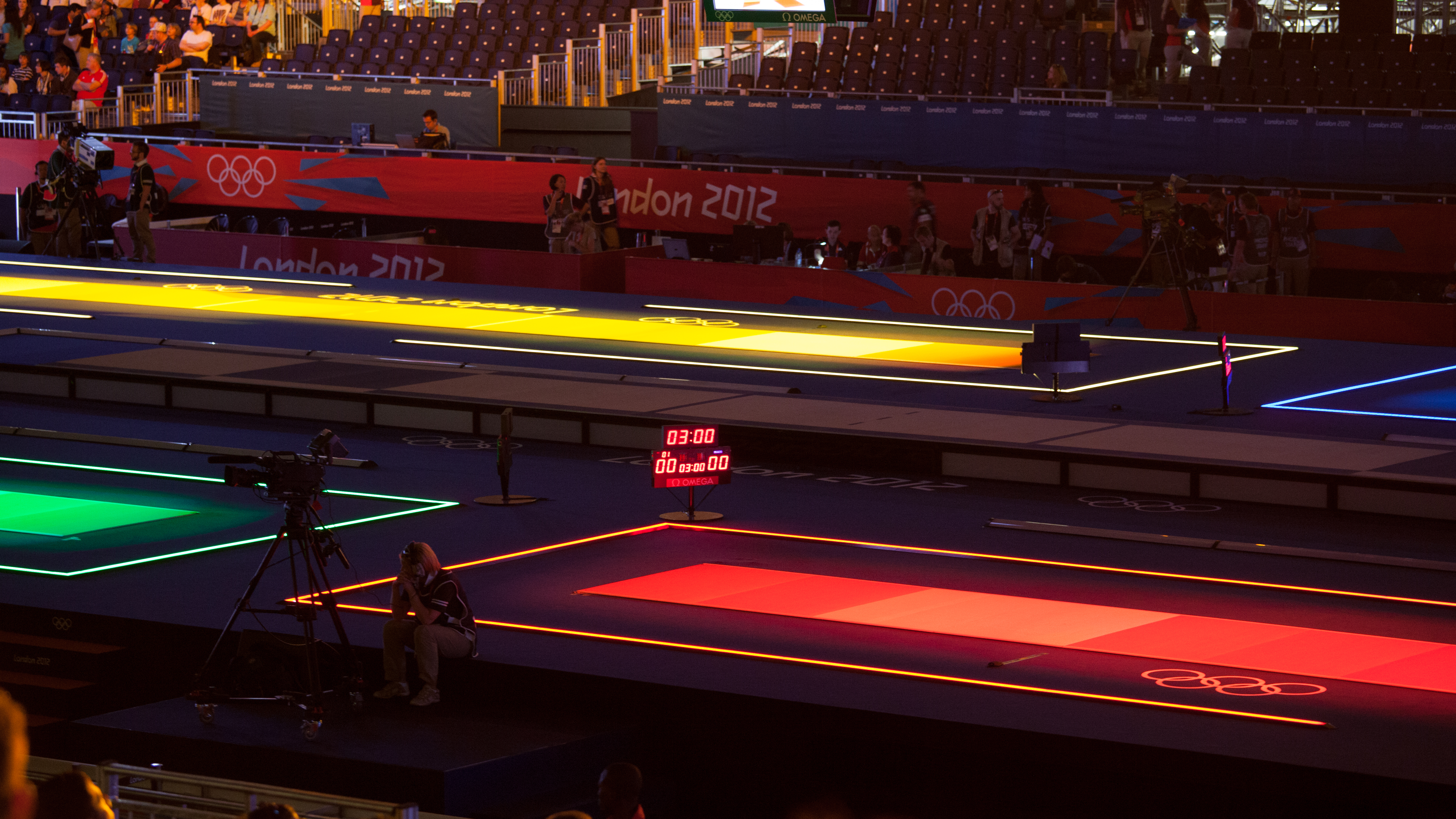
- Fencing pistes
- Venue: ExCeL London
- Date: 31 July
- Competitors: 38 from 20 nations

Medalists
| 1st place, gold medalist(s) | | Lei Sheng | China |
| 2nd place, silver medalist(s) | | Alaaeldin Abouelkassem | Egypt |
| 3rd place, bronze medalist(s) | | Choi Byung-chul | South Korea |

The men's foil competition in fencing at the 2012 Olympic Games in London was held on 31 July at the ExCeL London Exhibition Centre. There were 38 competitors from 20 nations. Lei Sheng of China won the gold medal, beating Alaaeldin Abouelkassem from Egypt in the final. It was the first medal in the individual men's foil for each of those nations. Choi Byung-chul of South Korea took bronze. The 2012 podium was the first time since 1904 that no European fencer won a medal in the event.

== Background ==
This was the 26th appearance of the event, which has been held at every Summer Olympics except 1908 (when there was a foil display only rather than a medal event). Seven of the eight quarterfinalists from 2008 returned: gold medalist Benjamin Kleibrink of Germany, silver medalist Yuki Ota of Japan, fourth-place finisher Zhu Jun of China, fifth-place finisher Peter Joppich of Germany, sixth-place finisher Andrea Cassarà of Italy, seventh-place finisher Erwann Le Péchoux of France, and eighth-place finisher Lei Sheng of China. The Italian team was highly regarded: Cassarà was the reigning world champion, Valerio Aspromonte had been the runner-up to him in 2011, and Andrea Baldini had won the world title in 2009. Germany also sent a strong team, led by defending champion Kleibrink and four-time (2003, 2006, 2007, and 2010) world champion Peter Joppich. Other contenders included Asian champion and three-time world medalist Lei and European champion Aleksey Cheremisinov of Russia.

Croatia made its debut in the men's foil. France and the United States each made their 24th appearance, tied for most of any nation; France had missed only the 1904 (with fencers not traveling to St. Louis) and the 1912 (boycotted due to a dispute over rules) foil competitions, while the United States had missed the inaugural 1896 competition and boycotted the 1980 Games altogether.

== Qualification ==
Nations were limited to three fencers each from 1928 to 2004. However, the 2008 Games introduced a rotation of men's team fencing events with one weapon left off each Games; the individual event without a corresponding team event had the number of fencers per nation reduced to two. Men's foil was the first event this applied to, so each nation could enter a maximum of two fencers in the event in 2008. The team foil was back in 2012 (épée the missing weapon for men), so the limit was three for 2012.

There were 36 dedicated quota spots for men's foil. The first 24 spots went to the 3 members of each of the 8 qualified teams in the team foil event. Next, 7 more men were selected from the world rankings based on continents: 2 from Europe, 2 from the Americas, 2 from Asia/Oceania, and 1 from Africa. Finally, 5 spots were allocated by continental qualifying events: 2 from Europe, 1 from the Americas, 1 from Asia/Oceania, and 1 from Africa.

Additionally, there were 8 host/invitational spots that could be spread throughout the various fencing events. Great Britain had already qualified one fencer in the men's foil (Richard Kruse, through individual rankings) and chose to use 2 of its 8 host places to bring its men's foil team up to 3. This made the total number of fencers in the event 38.

== Competition format ==
The foil competition consisted of a six-round single-elimination bracket with a bronze medal match between the two semifinal losers. Fencing was done to 15 touches or to the completion of three three-minute rounds if neither fencer reached 15 touches by then. At the end of time, the higher-scoring fencer was the winner; a tie resulted in an additional one-minute sudden-death time period. This sudden-death period was further modified by the selection of a draw-winner beforehand; if neither fencer scored a touch during the minute, the predetermined draw-winner won the bout.

== Schedule ==
All times are British Summer Time (UTC+1)

| Date | Time | Round |
|---|---|---|
| Tuesday, 31 July 2012 | 9:00 | Round of 64; Round of 32; Round of 16; Quarterfinals; Semifinals; Bronze medal match Final |

== Results ==
=== Section 1 ===
Round of 64
Nicholas Edward Choi (HKG) | 8
Radu Dărăban (ROU) | 15

Round of 32
Valerio Aspromonte (ITA) | 15
Radu Dărăban (ROU) | 11
Renal Ganeyev (RUS) | 9
Sebastian Bachmann (GER) | 15
Victor Sintès (FRA) | 15
Kenta Chida (JPN) | 11
Roland Schlosser (AUT) | 9
Lei Sheng (CHN) | 15

Round of 16
Valerio Aspromonte (ITA) | 15
Sebastian Bachmann (GER) | 11
Victor Sintès (FRA) | 6
Lei Sheng (CHN) | 15

Quarter-finals
Valerio Aspromonte (ITA) | 8
Lei Sheng (CHN) | 15

=== Section 2 ===
Round of 64
Anas Mostafa (EGY) | 5
Tarek Ayad (EGY) | 15
Lahoussine Ali (MAR) | 6
Guilherme Toldo (BRA) | 15

Round of 32
Aleksey Cheremisinov (RUS) | 15
Tarek Ayad (EGY) | 8
Étienne Lalonde‐Turbide (CAN) | 6
Alexander Massialas (USA) | 15
Andrea Baldini (ITA) | 15
Ryo Miyake (JPN) | 6
Guilherme Toldo (BRA) | 5
Race Imboden (USA) | 15

Round of 16
Aleksey Cheremisinov (RUS) | 15
Alexander Massialas (USA) | 6
Andrea Baldini (ITA) | 15
Race Imboden (USA) | 9

Quarter-finals
Aleksey Cheremisinov (RUS) | 5
Andrea Baldini (ITA) | 15

=== Section 3 ===
Round of 64
Bojan Jovanović (CRO) | 14
Daniel Gómez (MEX) | 15
Zhu Jun (CHN) | 15
Zain Shaito (LIB) | 2

Round of 32
Ma Jianfei (CHN) | 15
Daniel Gómez (MEX) | 9
Artur Akhmatkhuzin (RUS) | 15
Richard Kruse (GBR) | 5
Erwann Le Péchoux (FRA) | 15
Enzo Lefort (FRA) | 9
Zhu Jun (CHN) | 13
Choi Byung-chul (KOR) | 15

Round of 16
Ma Jianfei (CHN) | 15
Artur Akhmatkhuzin (RUS) | 11
Erwann Le Péchoux (FRA) | 13
Choi Byung-chul (KOR) | 15

Quarter-finals
Ma Jianfei (CHN) | 13
Choi Byung-chul (KOR) | 15

=== Section 4 ===
Round of 64
Husayn Rosowsky (GBR) | 8
Mohamed Samandi (TUN) | 15

Round of 32
Alaaeldin Abouelkassem (EGY) | 15
Miles Chamley-Watson (USA) | 10
James-Andrew Davis (GBR) | 10
Peter Joppich (GER) | 15
Yuki Ota (JPN) | 15
Benjamin Kleibrink (GER) | 5
Mohamed Samandi (TUN) | 7
Andrea Cassarà (ITA) | 15

Round of 16
Alaaeldin Abouelkassem (EGY) | 15
Peter Joppich (GER) | 10
Yuki Ota (JPN) | 14
Andrea Cassarà (ITA) | 15

Quarter-finals
Alaaeldin Abouelkassem (EGY) | 15
Andrea Cassarà (ITA) | 10

=== Finals ===
Semi-finals
Lei Sheng (CHN) | 15
Andrea Baldini (ITA) | 11
Choi Byung-chul (KOR) | 12
Alaaeldin Abouelkassem (EGY) | 15

Final
Lei Sheng (CHN) | 15
Alaaeldin Abouelkassem (EGY) | 13
Bronze medal match
Andrea Baldini (ITA) | 14
Choi Byung-chul (KOR) | 15

== Final classification ==
| Rank | Fencer | Nation |
|---|---|---|
| 1st place, gold medalist(s) | Lei Sheng | China |
| 2nd place, silver medalist(s) | Alaaeldin Abouelkassem | Egypt |
| 3rd place, bronze medalist(s) | Choi Byung-chul | South Korea |
| 4 | Andrea Baldini | Italy |
| 5 | Andrea Cassarà | Italy |
| 6 | Valerio Aspromonte | Italy |
| 7 | Ma Jianfei | China |
| 8 | Aleksey Cheremisinov | Russia |
| 9 | Race Imboden | United States |
| 10 | Victor Sintès | France |
| 11 | Peter Joppich | Germany |
| 12 | Erwann Le Péchoux | France |
| 13 | Alexander Massialas | United States |
| 14 | Yuki Ota | Japan |
| 15 | Sebastian Bachmann | Germany |
| 16 | Artur Akhmatkhuzin | Russia |
| 17 | Richard Kruse | Great Britain |
| 18 | Benjamin Kleibrink | Germany |
| 19 | Renal Ganeyev | Russia |
| 20 | Ryo Miyake | Japan |
| 21 | Étienne Lalonde-Turbide | Canada |
| 22 | Enzo Lefort | France |
| 23 | James-Andrew Davis | Great Britain |
| 24 | Kenta Chida | Japan |
| 25 | Miles Chamley-Watson | United States |
| 26 | Roland Schlosser | Austria |
| 27 | Zhu Jun | China |
| 28 | Tarek Fouad | Egypt |
| 29 | Daniel Gómez | Mexico |
| 30 | Radu Dărăban | Romania |
| 31 | Mohamed Samandi | Tunisia |
| 32 | Guilherme Toldo | Brazil |
| 33 | Lahoussine Ali | Morocco |
| 34 | Husayn Rosowsky | Great Britain |
| 35 | Nicholas Choi | Hong Kong |
| 36 | Bojan Jovanović | Croatia |
| 37 | Zain Shaito | Lebanon |
| 38 | Anas Mostafa | Egypt |
