= Fencing at the 2012 Summer Olympics – Men's team foil =

Men's team foil at the Games of the XXX Olympiad
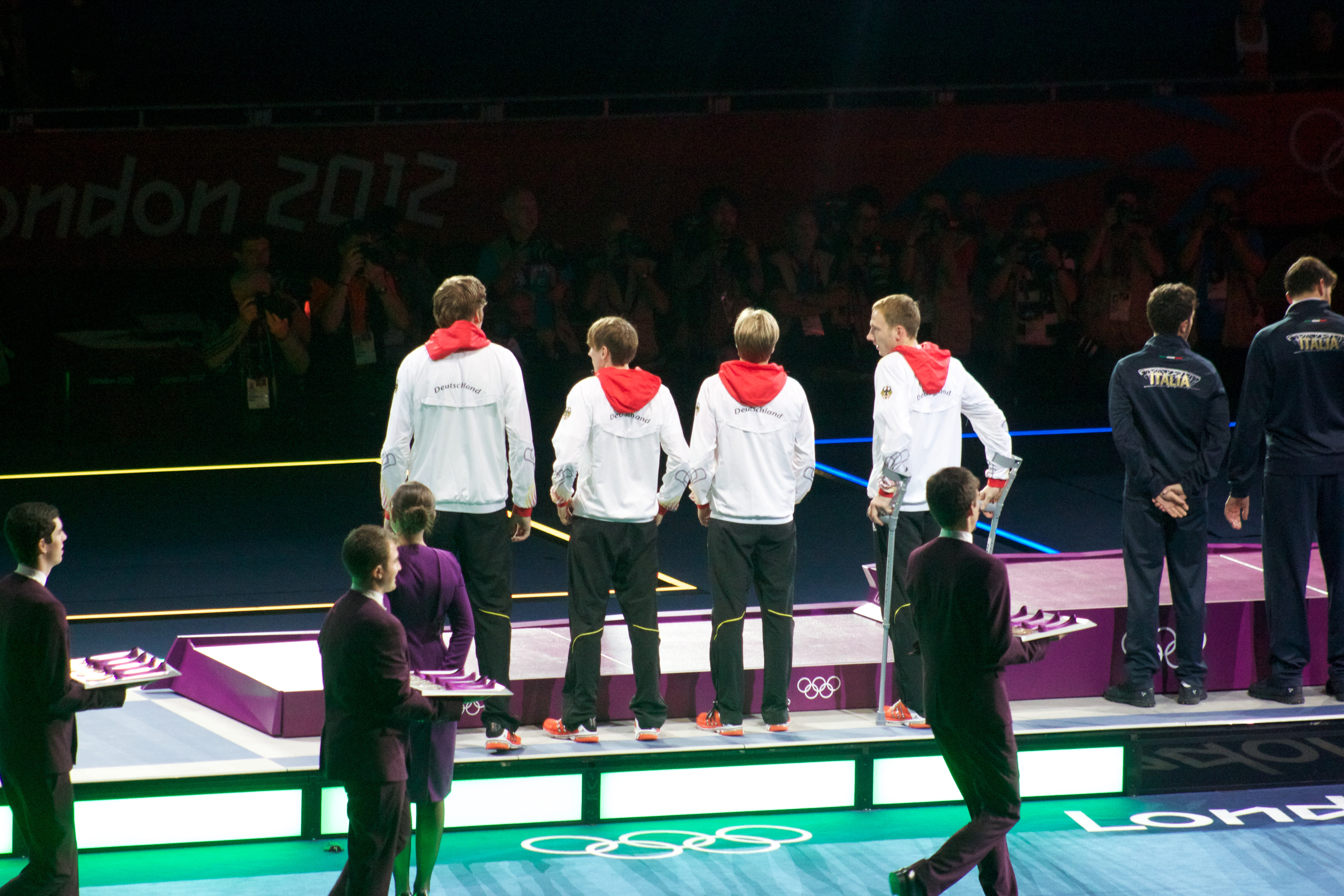
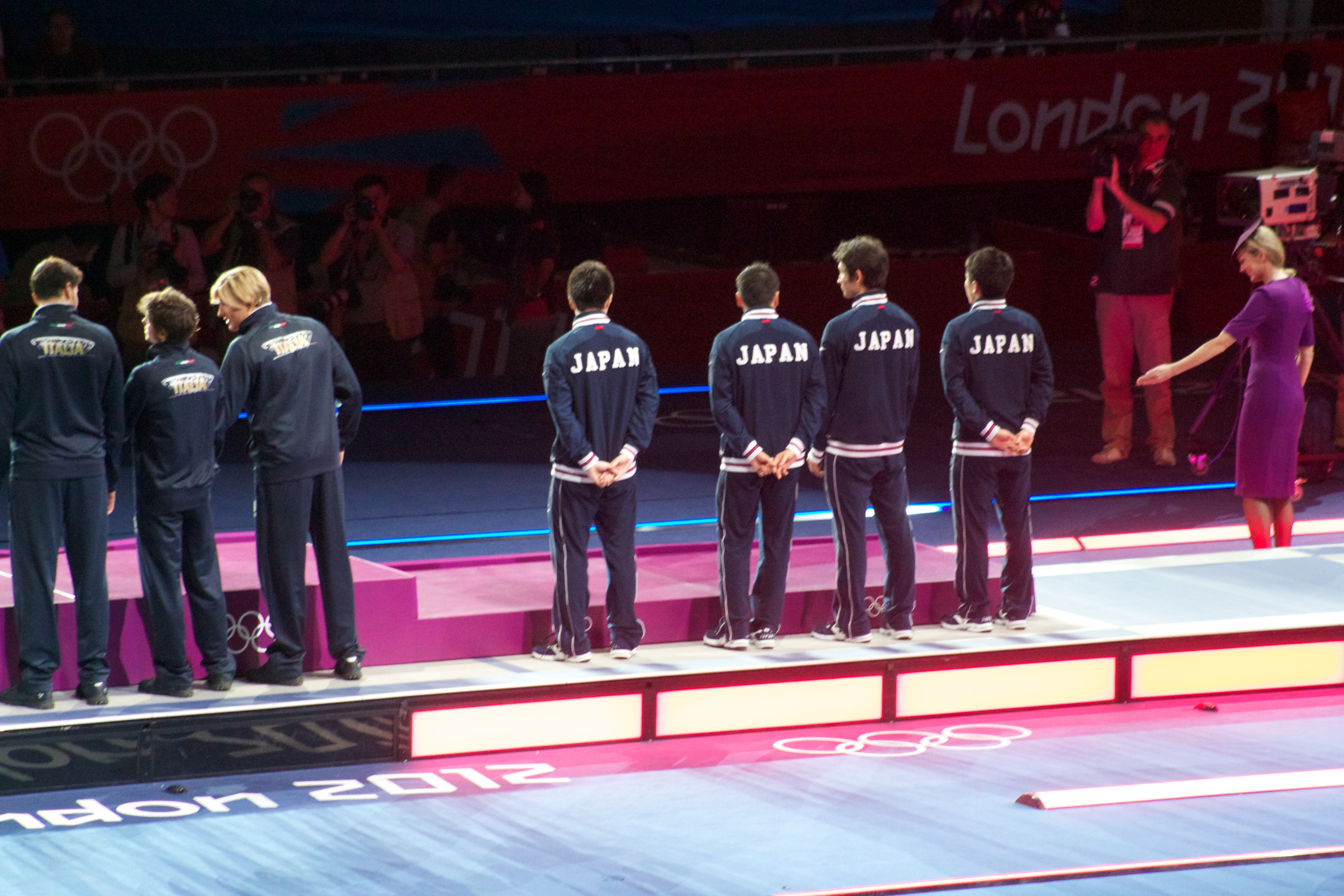
- Venue: ExCeL Exhibition Centre
- Date: 5 August
- Competitors: 35 from 9 nations

Medalists
1st place, gold medalist(s)		Andrea Baldini; Giorgio Avola; Andrea Cassarà; Valerio Aspromonte	Italy
2nd place, silver medalist(s)		Ryo Miyake; Yuki Ota; Kenta Chida; Suguru Awaji	Japan
3rd place, bronze medalist(s)		Peter Joppich; Sebastian Bachmann; Benjamin Kleibrink; André Weßels	Germany

The men's team foil competition in fencing at the 2012 Olympic Games in London was held on 5 August at the ExCeL Exhibition Centre.

Twenty-eight fencers from nine countries competed.

== Format ==
Great Britain, as hosts, were allowed to enter a team in any event they chose. They entered a team in this competition, and fenced against the 8th-seeded Egyptian team, with the winning team joining the seven other teams in the main quarter-final draw. Quarter-final losers continued fencing to determine ranking spots for fifth through eighth, while the quarter-final winners met in the semi-finals. The winners of the semi-final bouts competed for the gold medal, while the losing teams competed for the bronze.

Team events competed to a maximum of 45 touches.

== Schedule ==
All times are British Summer Time (UTC+1)

Date	Time	Round
Sunday, 5 August 2012	09:00	Round of 16
Sunday, 5 August 2012	10:30	Quarter-finals
Sunday, 5 August 2012	12:00	Semi-finals
Sunday, 5 August 2012	15:00	Placement 5-6 / 7-8
Sunday, 5 August 2012	18:00	Bronze medal match
Sunday, 5 August 2012	19:15	Final

== Draw ==
=== Finals ===
Round of 16
9	Great Britain	45
8	Egypt	33

Quarter-finals
1	Italy	45
9	Great Britain	40
5	United States	45
4	France	39
3	Germany	44
6	Russia	40
7	Japan	45
2	China	30

Semi-finals
1	Italy	45
5	United States	24
3	Germany	40
7	Japan (OT)	41

Finals
1	Italy	45
7	Japan	39
Third place
5	United States	27
3	Germany	45

=== Classification 5–8 ===
Placement 5–8
9	Great Britain	45
4	France	29
6	Russia	45
2	China	40

Placement 5–6
9	Great Britain	35
6	Russia	45
Placement 7–8
4	France	33
2	China	45

== Final classification ==
Rank	Team	Athlete
1st place, gold medalist(s)	Italy	Valerio Aspromonte; Andrea Baldini; Andrea Cassarà; Giorgio Avola
2nd place, silver medalist(s)	Japan	Kenta Chida; Ryo Miyake; Yuki Ota; Suguru Awaji
3rd place, bronze medalist(s)	Germany	Sebastian Bachmann; Peter Joppich; Benjamin Kleibrink; André Weßels
4	United States	Miles Chamley-Watson; Race Imboden; Alexander Massialas; Gerek Meinhardt
5	Russia	Artur Akhmatkhuzin; Aleksey Cheremisinov; Renal Ganeyev; Aleksey Khovanskiy
6	Great Britain	James-Andrew Davis; Richard Kruse; Husayn Rosowsky; Laurence Halsted
7	China	Lei Sheng; Ma Jianfei; Zhu Jun; Zhang Liangliang
8	France	Erwann Le Péchoux; Enzo Lefort; Victor Sintès; Marcel Marcilloux
9	Egypt	Alaaeldin Abouelkassem; Tarek Ayad; Sherif Farrag
