= Sebastian Bachmann =

German fencer (born 1986)

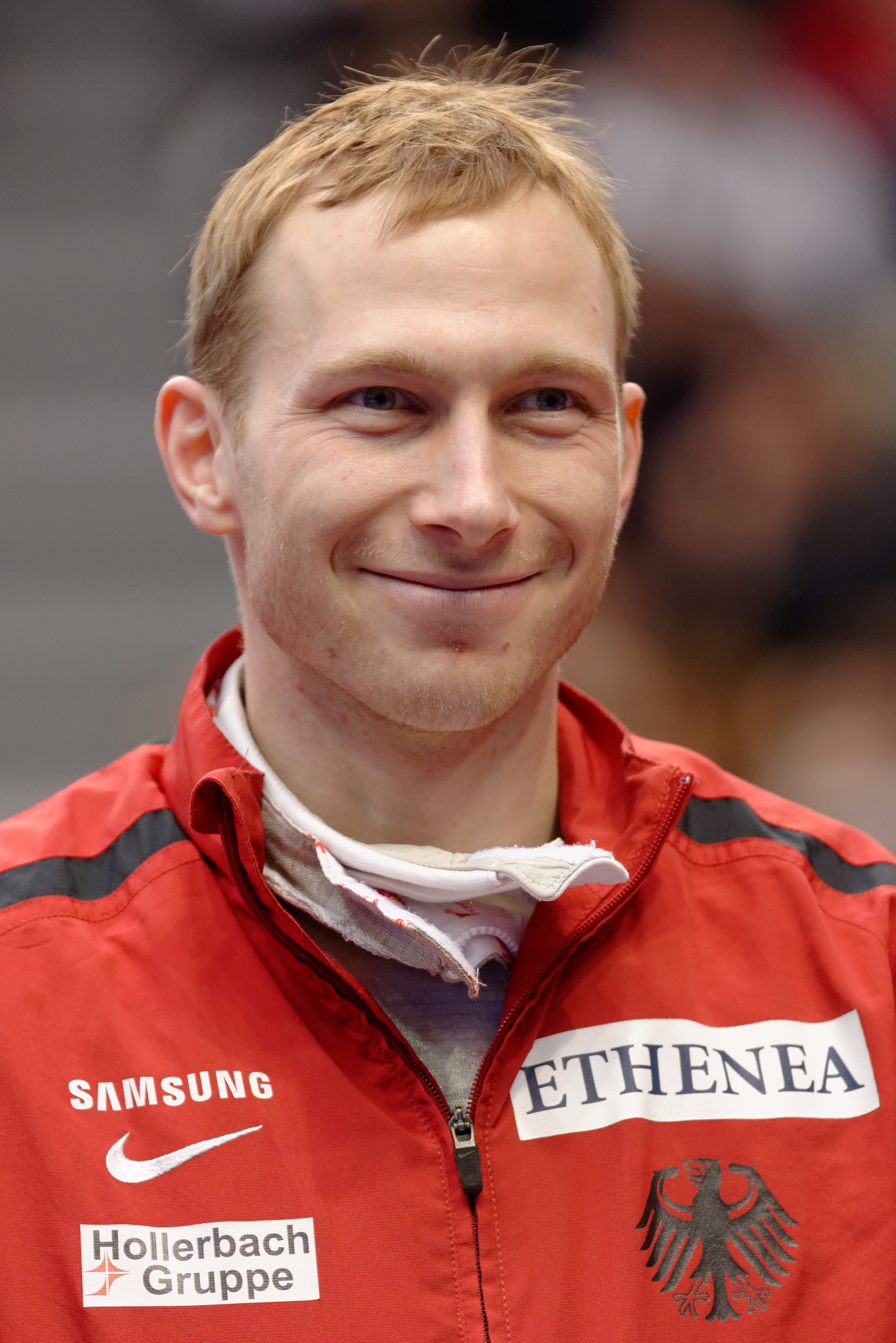

Personal information
- Nickname: Bachi
- Born: 24 November 1986 (age 39) Bad Mergentheim, West Germany
- Height: 1.82 m (6 ft 0 in)
- Weight: 71 kg (157 lb)

Fencing career
- Sport: Fencing
- Weapon: foil
- Hand: right-handed
- National coach: Ulrich Schreck
- Club: FC Tauberbischofsheim
- FIE ranking: current ranking
Medal record
Men's Foil
Representing Germany
Olympic Games
Bronze medal – third place	2012 London	Team
World Championships
Silver medal – second place	2009 Antalya	Team
Bronze medal – third place	2011 Catania	Team
European Championships
Gold medal – first place	2013 Zagreb	Team
Bronze medal – third place	2009 Plovdiv	Team
Bronze medal – third place	2012 Legnano	Team
Bronze medal – third place	2015 Montreux	Team

Sebastian Bachmann (born November 24, 1986) is a German foil fencer, silver medallist at the 2011 World Championships and bronze medallist at the 2012 Summer Olympics.

== Career ==
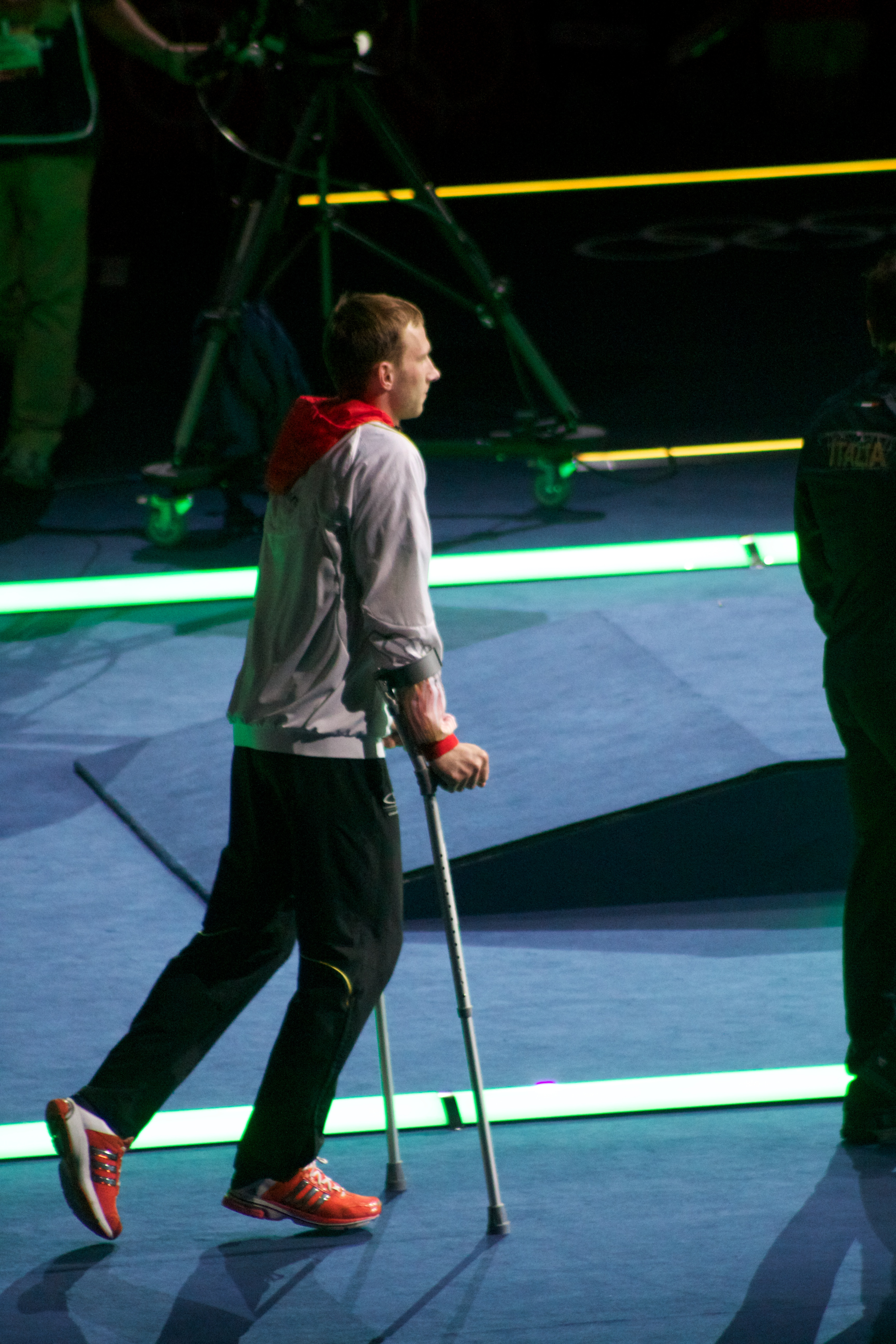
Injured Bachmann watches the end of the match for the bronze medal at the 2012 Summer Olympics

Bachmann took up fencing at the age of five in the craze that followed Germany's fencing medals in at the 1988 Summer Olympics, especially as his hometown Lauda-Königshofen was not far from Tauberbischofsheim, Germany's foil stronghold. He first practiced both foil and épée, before specializing into foil as a teenager.

Bachmann won the junior national championship in 2005 and 2006 and was part of the team that earned a silver medal in the 2006 Junior World Championships in Linz. These results caused him to be selected into the Sports Development Group of the Bundeswehr (German: Sportfördergruppe der Bundeswehr) in Stuttgart. In 2008 he switched from the Fencing-Club Tauberbischofsheim to the Sports Development Group in Cologne-Longerich and joined the Olympischer Fechtclub Bonn (OFC Bonn), which boasted a strong foil team led by federal coach Ulrich Schreck. He also pursued studies in computer science at the University of Cologne.

He joined the senior national team for the 2009 European Championships in Plovdiv. Germany lost by a single hit to Italy in the semi-finals, but prevailed over Great Britain in the “small final” to take the bronze medal. The same year at the World Championships in Antalya Germany reached the final, but were again overcome by Italy and doomed to the silver medal. They took two other bronze medals at the 2011 World Championships in Catania and at the 2011 European Championships in Legnano.

Bachmann secured his qualification to the 2012 Summer Olympics through the team. In the individual event he defeated Russia's Renal Ganeyev before yielding to Italy's Valerio Aspromonte in the table of 16. In the team event Germany prevailed over Russia, but lost to Japan in the semi-finals by a single hit in overtime, leaving Bachmann frustrated as two of his hits had been refused by the referee. Germany met the US in the match for the bronze medal. During the seventh bout against Gerek Meinhardt Bachmann tumbled off the piste and twisted his right knee. The bout was suspended for medical intervention and Bachmann was eventually replaced by reserve André Weßels. Germany prevailed 45–27 and came away with a bronze medal. Bachmann finished the 2011–12 season No.18 in world rankings, a career best as of 2015.

At the 2013 European Championships in Zagreb Germany knocked off Hungary and Great Britain, then prevailed over Poland in the final to give Bachmann his first major gold medal. At the World Championships in Budapest he reached the quarter-finals for the first time in his career. He met the USA's Miles Chamley-Watson and took a 10–3 lead, but the American managed to come back. Bachmann lost 14–15 on a controversial red card and Chamley-Watson eventually won the gold medal. The following year, at the Kazan World Championships, Bachmann met Chamley-Watson again, this time in the table of 32. He acquired a 12–5 lead. On 14–7 for Bachmann Chamley-Watson was shown a red card for turning his back during the bout, allowing the German to win 15–7. Bachmann reached again the quarter-finals, where he was stopped by Russia's Timur Safin.
