= Fencing at the 2011 Arab Games =

Fencing at the 2011 Pan Arab Games
- Venue: Aspire Zone
- Location: Doha, Qatar
- Dates: 18-23 December

At the 2011 Pan Arab Games, the fencing events were held at Aspire Zone in Doha, Qatar from 18–23 December. A total of 12 events were contested.

== Medal summary ==
=== Men ===
| Event | Gold | Silver | Bronze |
|---|---|---|---|
| Individual Épée | Ayman Fayez (EGY) | Ahmed Soliman (EGY) | Khaled Buhdeima (LBA) |
| Individual Épée | Ayman Fayez (EGY) | Ahmed Soliman (EGY) | Mohammed Ferjani (TUN) |
| Team Épée | Egypt (EGY); Ahmed Soliman; Ahmed Khder; Ayman Fayez; Moatazbellah Abdelkarem | Kuwait (KUW); Husain Kamal; Qaisar Alzamel; Khaled Alshammari; Yousef Alkhayyat | Iraq (IRQ); Sarmad Qasim; Abbas Mohsin; Alaa Al-Doori |
| Team Épée | Egypt (EGY); Ahmed Soliman; Ahmed Khder; Ayman Fayez; Moatazbellah Abdelkarem | Kuwait (KUW); Husain Kamal; Qaisar Alzamel; Khaled Alshammari; Yousef Alkhayyat | Tunisia (TUN); Mohammed Ben Aziza; Mohammed Ayoub Ferjani; Jawhar Miled; Mohammed Smandi |
| Individual Foil | Alaaeldin Abouelkassem (EGY) | Zain Shaito (LIB) | Tarek Fouad (EGY) |
| Individual Foil | Alaaeldin Abouelkassem (EGY) | Zain Shaito (LIB) | Karim Kamoun (TUN) |
| Team Foil | Egypt (EGY); Alaaeldin Abouelkassem; Mohamed Essam; Sherif Farrag; Tarek Fouad | Tunisia (TUN); Mohammed Ben Aziza; Mohammed Ayoub Ferjani; Karim Kamoun; Mohammed Smandi | Jordan (JOR); Darar Barakat; Ahmad Al Sheikh Yousef; Fahed Abu-Assaf |
| Team Foil | Egypt (EGY); Alaaeldin Abouelkassem; Mohamed Essam; Sherif Farrag; Tarek Fouad | Tunisia (TUN); Mohammed Ben Aziza; Mohammed Ayoub Ferjani; Karim Kamoun; Mohammed Smandi | Kuwait (KUW); Abdullateef Alhumaidan; Naser Alwaleed; Yaser Mohammad; Imad Yousef |
| Individual Sabre | Iheb Ben Chaabene (TUN) | Mahmoud Samir (EGY) | Salah Itbi (IRQ) |
| Individual Sabre | Iheb Ben Chaabene (TUN) | Mahmoud Samir (EGY) | Hichem Smandi (TUN) |
| Team Sabre | Tunisia (TUN); Amine Akkari; Iheb Ben Chaabene; Souhaib Sakrani; Hichem Smandi | Kuwait (KUW); Abdullah Alkhaiyat; Abdullah Alshamali; Khaled Alshamlan; Mohammad Khalaf | Egypt (EGY); Mannad Gazi; Tamim Gazi; Ahmed Loutfi; Mahmoud Samir |
| Team Sabre | Tunisia (TUN); Amine Akkari; Iheb Ben Chaabene; Souhaib Sakrani; Hichem Smandi | Kuwait (KUW); Abdullah Alkhaiyat; Abdullah Alshamali; Khaled Alshamlan; Mohammad Khalaf | Iraq (IRQ); Haitham Al-Bazooni; Hamzah Al-Mohammedawi; Salah Itbi; Ahmed Jawad |

=== Women ===
| Event | Gold | Silver | Bronze |
|---|---|---|---|
| Individual Épée | Sarra Besbes (TUN) | Maya Mansouri (TUN) | Mona Abdelaziz (EGY) |
| Individual Épée | Sarra Besbes (TUN) | Maya Mansouri (TUN) | Ayah Mahdy (EGY) |
| Team Épée | Tunisia (TUN); Dorra Ben Jaballah; Sarra Besbes; Ines Boubakri; Maya Mansouri | Egypt (EGY); Mona Abdelaziz; Ayah Mahdy; Nada Mostafa; Salma Moukbel | Lebanon (LIB); Rita Abou Jaoudeh; Maya Shaito; Mona Shaito; Dominique Tannous |
| Team Épée | Tunisia (TUN); Dorra Ben Jaballah; Sarra Besbes; Ines Boubakri; Maya Mansouri | Egypt (EGY); Mona Abdelaziz; Ayah Mahdy; Nada Mostafa; Salma Moukbel | Qatar (QAT); Thkrayat Al-Abdulla; Abrar Alattef; Fatma Al-Julandani; Fatima Hammad |
| Individual Foil | Mona Shaito (LIB) | Ines Boubakri (TUN) | Shaimaa Elgammal (EGY) |
| Individual Foil | Mona Shaito (LIB) | Ines Boubakri (TUN) | Eman Shaban (EGY) |
| Team Foil | Tunisia (TUN); Dorra Ben Jaballah; Sarra Besbes; Ines Boubakri; Haifa Jabri | Egypt (EGY); Eman Elgammal; Shaimaa Elgammal; Rana Elhusseiny; Eman Shaban | Lebanon (LIB); Rita Abou Jaoudeh; Malak Shaito; Maya Shaito; Mona Shaito |
| Team Foil | Tunisia (TUN); Dorra Ben Jaballah; Sarra Besbes; Ines Boubakri; Haifa Jabri | Egypt (EGY); Eman Elgammal; Shaimaa Elgammal; Rana Elhusseiny; Eman Shaban | Qatar (QAT); Jawaher Al-Abdullah; Maryam Al-Khelaifi; Noora Al-Kuwari; Ghareeba Hammad |
| Individual Sabre | Azza Besbes (TUN) | Mennatalla Ahmed (EGY) | Amira Ben Chaabene (TUN) |
| Individual Sabre | Azza Besbes (TUN) | Mennatalla Ahmed (EGY) | Alexandra Tannous (LIB) |
| Team Sabre | Tunisia (TUN); Amira Ben Chaabene; Azza Besbes; Hala Besbes; Yosra Ghrairi | Egypt (EGY); Mennatalla Ahmed; Mariam Elsawy; Sara Mohamed; Salma Zeen | Jordan (JOR); Rahaf Al-Hadidi; Lara Alzyadat; Maria Barakat |
| Team Sabre | Tunisia (TUN); Amira Ben Chaabene; Azza Besbes; Hala Besbes; Yosra Ghrairi | Egypt (EGY); Mennatalla Ahmed; Mariam Elsawy; Sara Mohamed; Salma Zeen | Lebanon (LIB); Malak Shaito; Mona Shaito; Hiba Tabet; Alezandra Tannous |

== Medal table ==
* Host nation (Qatar)

| Rank | Nation | Gold | Silver | Bronze | Total |
|---|---|---|---|---|---|
| 1 | Tunisia | 7 | 3 | 5 | 15 |
| 2 | Egypt | 4 | 6 | 6 | 16 |
| 3 | Lebanon | 1 | 1 | 4 | 6 |
| 4 | Kuwait | 0 | 2 | 1 | 3 |
| 5 | Iraq | 0 | 0 | 3 | 3 |
| 6 | Jordan | 0 | 0 | 2 | 2 |
| 6 | Qatar* | 0 | 0 | 2 | 2 |
| 8 | Libya | 0 | 0 | 1 | 1 |
| Totals (8 entries) | | 12 | 12 | 24 | 48 |
