= Giorgio Avola =

Italian fencer (born 1989)

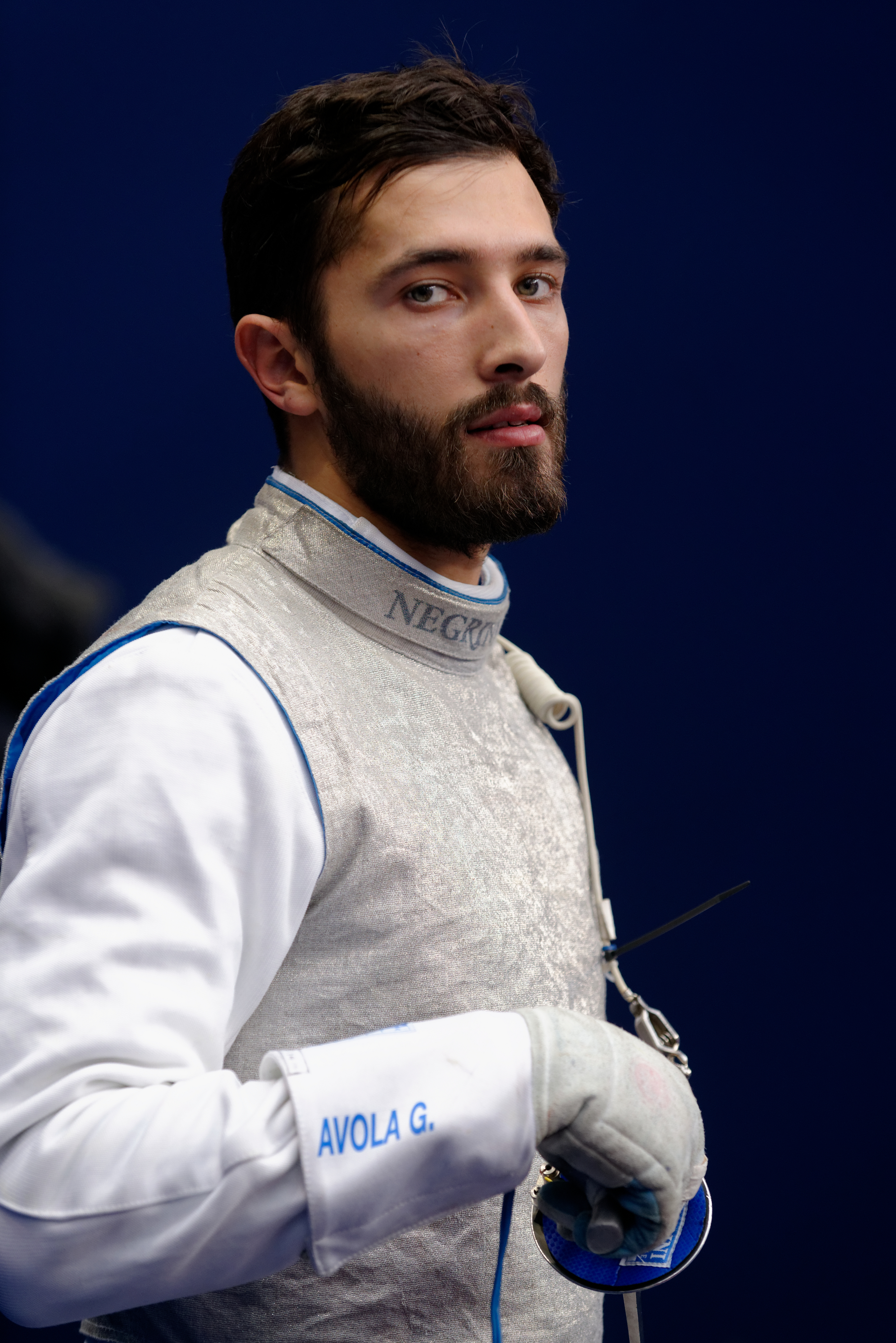

Personal information
- Born: 8 May 1989 (age 37) Modica, Sicily, Italy
- Height: 1.78 m (5 ft 10 in)
- Weight: 70 kg (154 lb)

Fencing career
- Sport: Fencing
- Country: Italy
- Weapon: Foil
- Hand: right-handed
- National coach: Andrea Cipressa
- Club: G.S. Fiamme Gialle
- Personal coach: Eugenio Migliore
- FIE ranking: current ranking
Medal record
Olympic Games
Gold medal – first place	2012 London	Team
World Championships
Gold medal – first place	2013 Budapest	Team
Gold medal – first place	2015 Moscow	Team
Gold medal – first place	2017 Leipzig	Team
Gold medal – first place	2018 Wuxi	Team
Bronze medal – third place	2011 Catania	Individual
Bronze medal – third place	2014 Kazan	Team
Bronze medal – third place	2019 Budapest	Team
European Championships
Gold medal – first place	2010 Leipzig	Team
Gold medal – first place	2011 Sheffield	Individual
Gold medal – first place	2011 Sheffield	Team
Gold medal – first place	2012 Legnano	Team
Silver medal – second place	2014 Strasbourg	Team
Silver medal – second place	2016 Toruń	Team
Silver medal – second place	2018 Novi Sad	Team
Bronze medal – third place	2016 Toruń	Individual
Bronze medal – third place	2017 Tbilisi	Individual
Bronze medal – third place	2017 Tbilisi	Team
Bronze medal – third place	2018 Novi Sad	Individual
Bronze medal – third place	2019 Düsseldorf	Team
Bronze medal – third place	2022 Antalya	Individual

Giorgio Avola (born 8 May 1989) is an Italian right-handed foil fencer.

A three-time Olympian, Avola competed in the 2012 London Olympic Games, the 2016 Rio de Janeiro Olympic Games, and the 2020 Tokyo Olympic Games, being crowned Olympic team champion in 2012. He is also a three-time team European champion, 2011 individual European champion, and four-time team world champion.

== Medal record ==
=== Olympic Games ===
Year	Location	Event	Position
2012	London, United Kingdom	Team Men's Foil	1st

=== World Championship ===
Year	Location	Event	Position
2011	Catania, Italy	Individual Men's Foil	3rd
2011	Catania, Italy	Team Men's Foil	3rd
2013	Budapest, Hungary	Team Men's Foil	1st
2014	Kazan, Russia	Team Men's Foil	3rd
2015	Moscow, Russia	Team Men's Foil	1st
2017	Leipzig, Germany	Team Men's Foil	1st
2018	Wuxi, China	Team Men's Foil	1st

=== European Championship ===
Year	Location	Event	Position
2010	Leipzig, Germany	Team Men's Foil	1st
2011	Sheffield, United Kingdom	Individual Men's Foil	1st
2011	Sheffield, United Kingdom	Team Men's Foil	1st
2012	Legnano, Italy	Team Men's Foil	1st
2014	Strasbourg, France	Team Men's Foil	2nd
2016	Toruń, Poland	Team Men's Foil	2nd
2017	(Georgia (country)) Tbilisi, Georgia	Team Men's Foil	3rd
2018	Novi Sad, Serbia	Team Men's Foil	2nd
2019	Düsseldorf, Germany	Team Men's Foil	3rd
2022	Antalya, Turkey	Individual Men's Foil	3rd

=== Grand Prix ===
Date	Location	Event	Position
01-06-2012	St. Petersburg, Russia	Individual Men's Foil	2nd
17-03-2017	(United States) Long Beach, California	Individual Men's Foil	3rd

=== World Cup ===
Date	Location	Event	Position
27-02-2010	Bonn, Germany	Individual Men's Foil	2nd
03-06-2010	Havana, Cuba	Individual Men's Foil	3rd
28-01-2011	Paris, France	Individual Men's Foil	2nd
18-05-2012	Seoul, South Korea	Individual Men's Foil	2nd
29-06-2012	Havana, Cuba	Individual Men's Foil	2nd
25-01-2013	Paris, France	Individual Men's Foil	3rd
22-03-2013	Bonn, Germany	Individual Men's Foil	3rd
24-05-2013	Havana, Cuba	Individual Men's Foil	2nd
11-11-2016	Tokyo, Japan	Individual Men's Foil	2nd
20-01-2017	Paris, France	Individual Men's Foil	3rd
19-01-2018	Paris, France	Individual Men's Foil	3rd
11-01-2019	Paris, France	Individual Men's Foil	3rd
01-03-2019	Cairo, Egypt	Individual Men's Foil	3rd
16-04-2022	Belgrade, Serbia	Individual Men's Foil	2nd
