= Lahoussine Ali =

Moroccan fencer

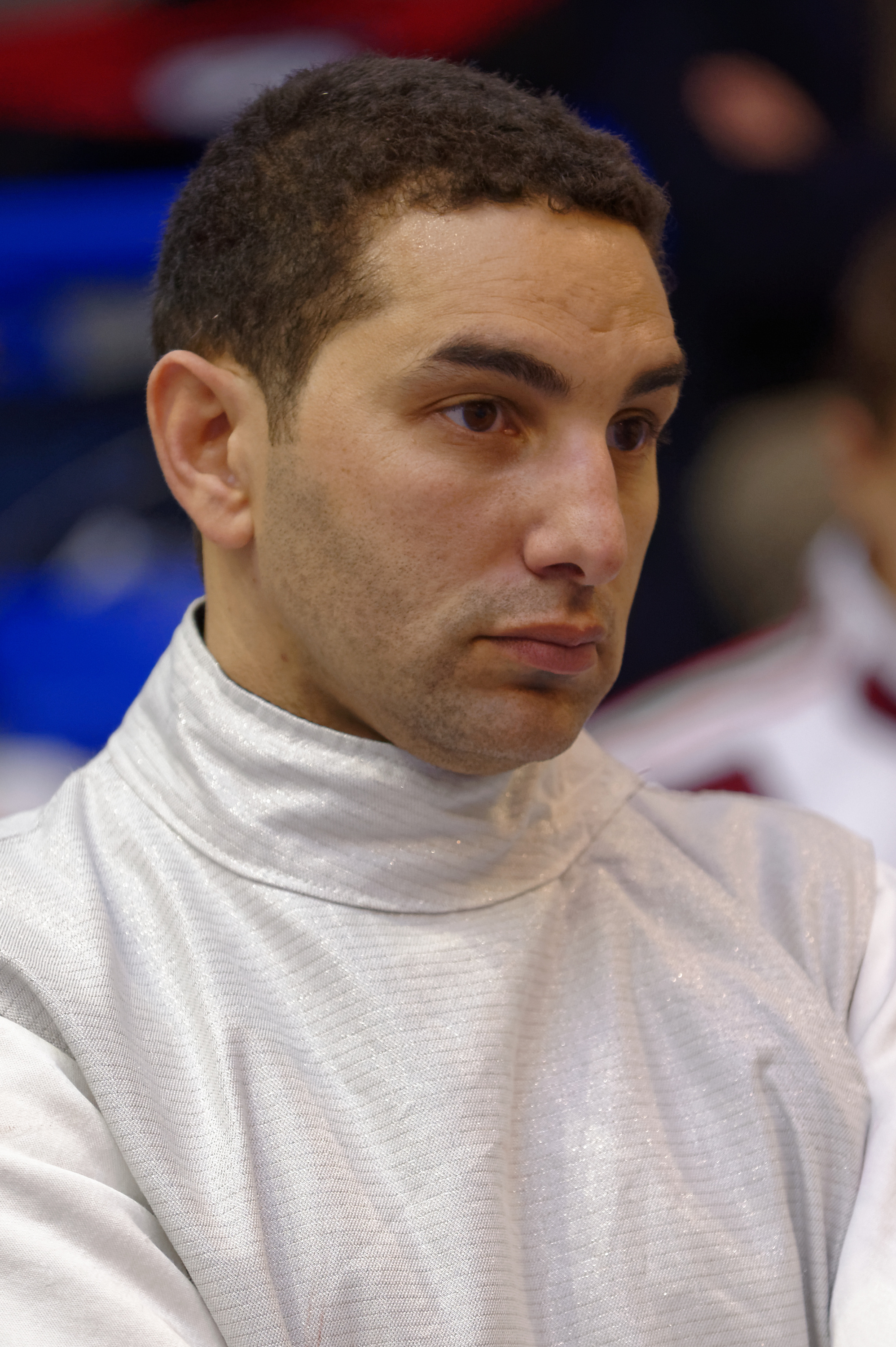
- Ali in 2016

Personal information
- Full name: Lahoussine Xavier Ali
- Born: 16 August 1974 (age 52) Clichy, Hauts-de-Seine, France
- Height: 1.76 m (5 ft 9 in)
- Weight: 68 kg (150 lb)

Fencing career
- Sport: Fencing
- Weapon: foil
- Hand: right-handed
- FIE ranking: current ranking

Lahoussine Ali (born 16 August 1974) is a Moroccan fencer. At the 2012 Summer Olympics he competed in the Men's foil, but was defeated in the first round.
