= Ryo Miyake =

Japanese fencer (born 1990)

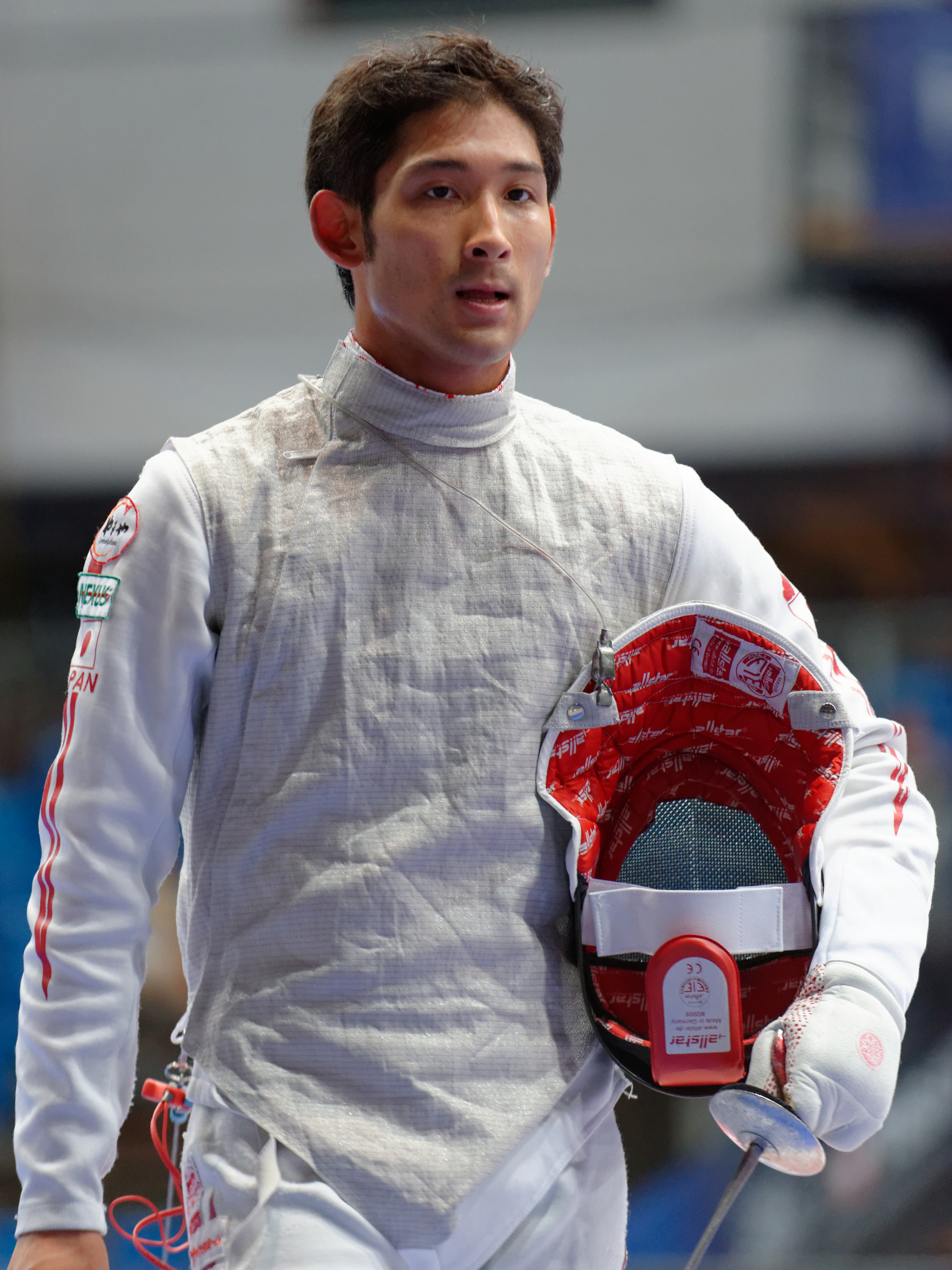
- At the 2013 World Fencing Championships

Personal information
- Born: 24 December 1990 (age 35) Ichikawa, Chiba Prefecture, Japan
- Height: 1.78 m (5 ft 10 in)
- Weight: 70 kg (154 lb)

Fencing career
- Sport: Fencing
- Weapon: foil
- Hand: left-handed
- FIE ranking: current ranking
Medal record
Men's Foil (fencing)
Olympic Games
Silver medal – second place	2012 London	Team foil
Asian Fencing Championships
Gold medal – first place	2019 Chiba	Team foil
Silver medal – second place	2010 Seoul	Team foil
Silver medal – second place	2011 Seoul	Team foil
Silver medal – second place	2013 Shanghai	Individual sabre
Silver medal – second place	2013 Shanghai	Team foil
Bronze medal – third place	2010 Seoul	Individual sabre
Bronze medal – third place	2012 Wakayama	Individual sabre
Bronze medal – third place	2012 Wakayama	Team foil
Bronze medal – third place	2014 Suwon	Team foil
Bronze medal – third place	2015 Singapore	Team foil

Ryo Miyake (三宅 諒, Miyake Ryō; born 24 December 1990) is a Japanese fencer. At the 2012 Summer Olympics he competed in the Men's foil, but was defeated in the second round. He won a silver medal in the team foil event.

During the postponement of the 2020 Summer Olympics, Miyake worked as a deliveryman for Uber Eats.
