= Alaaeldin Abouelkassem =

Egyptian fencer (born 1990)

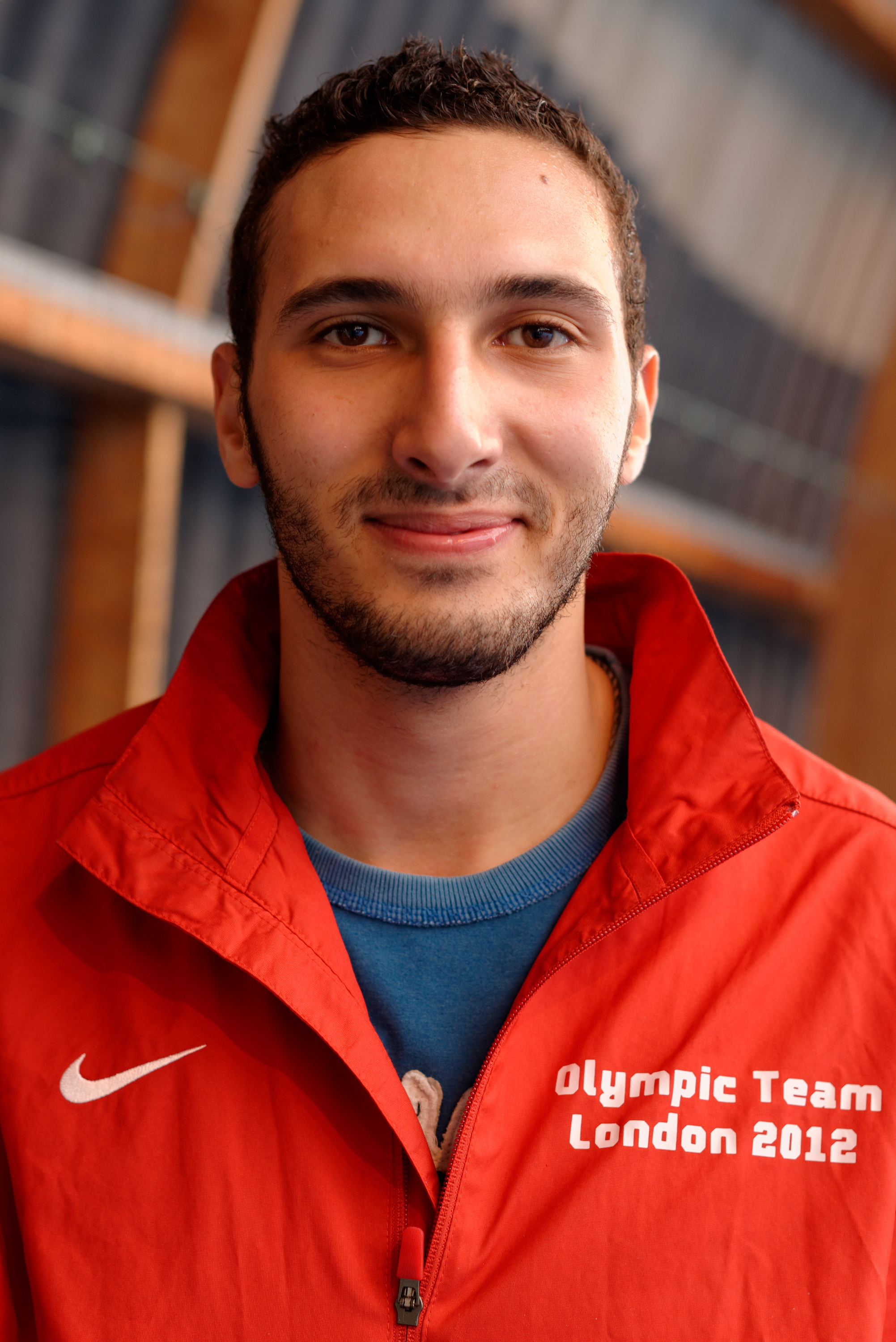
- Abouelkassem at the Challenge Revenu 2013

Personal information
- Full name: Alaaeldin Mohamed El-Sayed Abouelkassem
- Nationality: Egyptian
- Born: 25 November 1990 (age 35) Sétif, Algeria
- Height: 1.88 m (6 ft 2 in)
- Weight: 82 kg (181 lb)

Fencing career
- Sport: Fencing
- Country: Egypt
- Weapon: foil
- Hand: left-handed
- FIE ranking: current ranking
Medal record
Men's foil
Representing Egypt
Olympic Games
Silver medal – second place	2012 London	Foil
Pan Arab Games
Gold medal – first place	2011 Doha	Foil
Gold medal – first place	2011 Doha	Team foil
Mediterranean Games
Bronze medal – third place	2013 Mersin	Foil
African Games
Gold medal – first place	2015 Brazzaville	Foil
Gold medal – first place	2015 Brazzaville	Team foil
Gold medal – first place	2019 Rabat	Foil
Gold medal – first place	2019 Rabat	Team foil
African Championships
Gold medal – first place	2024 Casablanca	Team foil
Bronze medal – third place	2024 Casablanca	Foil

Alaaeldin Mohamed El-Sayed Abouelkassem (Arabic: علاء الدين محمد السيد أبو القاسم; born 25 November 1990) is an Egyptian fencer who won a silver medal in the men's foil event at the 2012 Summer Olympics. He took up fencing at the age of eight and, in 2008, began fencing internationally, winning medals at the African and World Junior Championships, as well as the Junior World Cup, before progressing to the senior level in 2011 and capturing bronze at the Fleuret de St-Petersbourg. Later that year, he earned gold medals at the 2011 Pan Arab Games in the individual and team foil events before progressing to the 2012 Summer Games, where he won Africa's first-ever Olympic fencing medal.

== Early life ==
Abouelkassem was born on 25 November 1990 in Sétif, Algeria to an Egyptian father and an Algerian mother and moved to Egypt at the age of four. Growing up in Alexandria, he first became athletically involved in swimming and karate before beginning his training in fencing aged eight in the city's Al-Selah Al-Sakandry club. After successes in the sport at a young age, he was forced to give it up upon entering the Arab Academy for Science and Technology and Maritime Transport, as the program was too demanding for him to pursue engineering studies and fencing. He was soon re-discovered by his former coach, Mohamed El-Sayed, who nominated him to join the national team.

== Career ==
Abouelkassem's international career began in 2008, when he captured a gold medal in foil fencing at the African Junior Championships and bronze at the World Junior Fencing Championships in Italy, in addition to one third-place finish at the Junior Fencing World Cup. At the 2009 Junior Fencing World Cup, he earned another third-place win and followed up with gold one year later at the 2010 World Junior Fencing Championships. He earned his first World Cup medal as a senior, bronze, at the 2011 Fleuret de St-Petersbourg, and captured gold at the 2011 Pan Arab Games in the individual and team foil events.

Abouelkassem qualified for the 2012 Summer Olympics and entered the individual foil event in the round of 32, defeating American Miles Chamley-Watson 15–10. He had the same result against Peter Joppich of Germany and Andrea Cassarà of Italy in the round of 16 and quarterfinals, respectively, before moving on to defeat Choi Byung-Chul of South Korea 15–12 in the semi-finals. Abouelkassem lost the gold medal match 13–15 to Lei Sheng of China, but the silver medal he won was the first Olympic fencing medal for a competitor representing an African nation. He also participated in the team foil event, where the British team eliminated the Egyptians by a score of 45–33 in the opening round.

At the 2013 Mediterranean Games, Abouelkassem won a bronze medal in the individual foil. As of 2013, he is coached by Paul Kantorsky of Poland. At the 2015 African Games he won gold medals in the men's individual and team foil events.

Olympic Games
Preceded by Ahmed El-Ahmar	Flag bearer for Egypt; 2020 Tokyo with Hedaya Malak	Succeeded by Incumbent
