= Radu Dărăban =

Romanian fencer (born 1983)

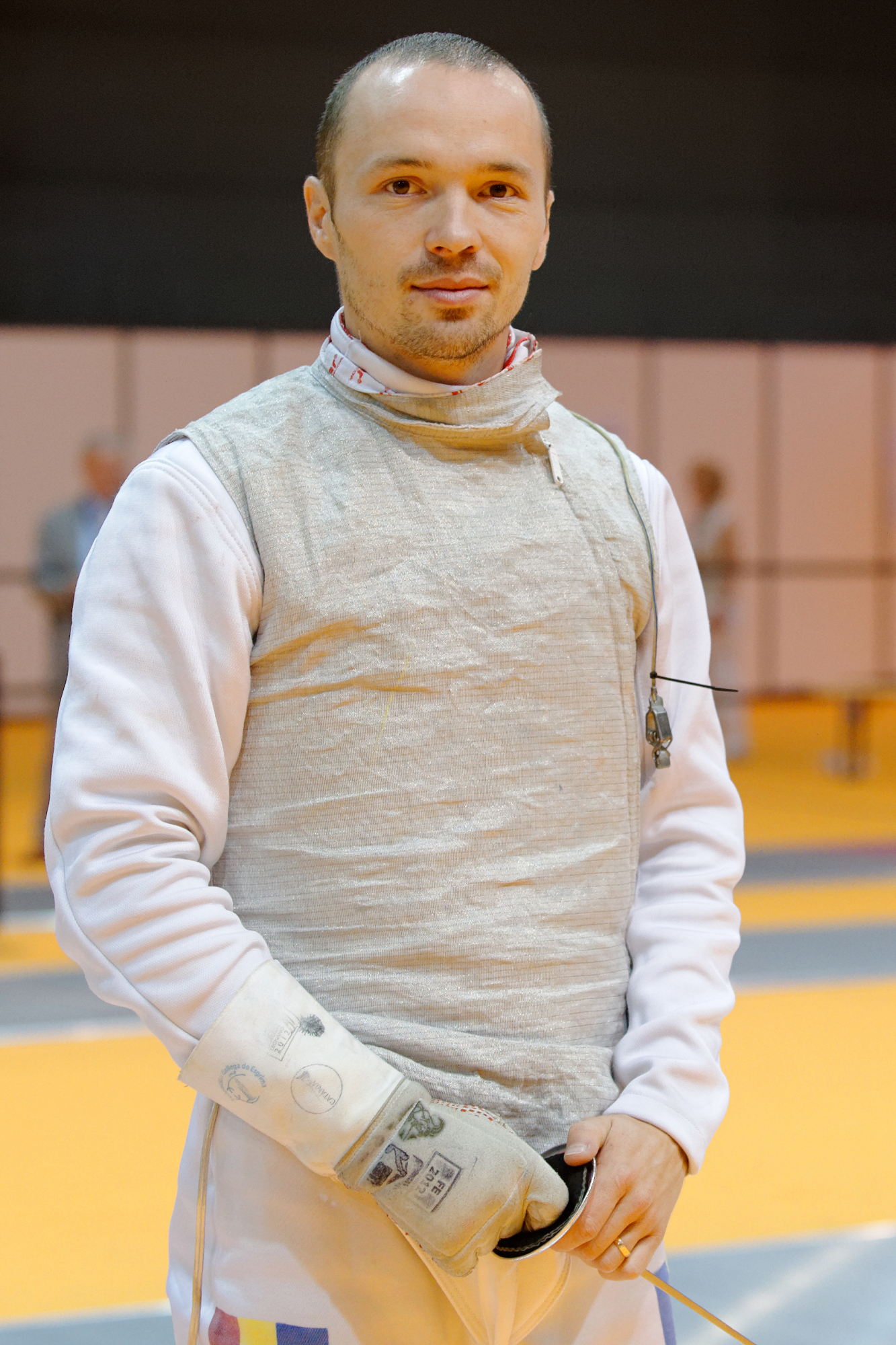
- At the 2014 European Fencing Championships

Personal information
- Full name: Radu Horea Dărăban
- Born: 6 June 1983 (age 43) Cluj-Napoca, Romania
- Height: 1.75 m (5 ft 9 in)
- Weight: 65 kg (143 lb; 10.2 st)

Fencing career
- Sport: Fencing
- Country: Romania
- Weapon: Foil
- Hand: right-handed
- Club: CS Universitatea Cluj-Napoca
- FIE ranking: current ranking

Radu Dărăban (born 26 June 1983) is a Romanian fencer. In the 2012 Summer Olympics he competed in the Men's foil, but was defeated in the second round.

== Career ==
Dărăban began fencing at age 9 at his local club, CSM Cluj, where he was trained by Mugur Codreanu. He won the Junior National Championship in 2001 and 2002. He later transferred to CSA Steaua Bucharest and joined the national team. He placed fourth in the team event of the 2006 European Championships at İzmir, after Romania were defeated by Russia in the small final.

In 2012 Dărăban reached the final in the Olympic qualification tournament at Bratislava after defeating Alexander Choupenitch of the Czech Republic in the quarter-final, then Portugal's Gael Santos, to qualify for the 2012 Summer Olympics. In London, he disposed 15–8 of Choi Nicholas Edward of Hong Kong, then met World silver medal Valerio Aspromonte. He took an early 5–0 lead before Aspromonte came back to 6–6 at the end of the first leg. Dărăban regained the lead, but lost control of the match after receiving a red card on 10–8 and was defeated 15–11.

After winning the Romanian Cup in October 2013 Dărăban transferred to CSU Cluj, where he began coaching. He took part in the 2004 European Championships in Strasbourg. After making it out of pools, he defeated Turkey's Tevfik Burak Babaoğlu in the table of 64, but was stopped by Timur Safin of Russia. In the team event, the Romania team he captained was beaten by No.1 seed Russia, then by Belarus, before winning against Turkey to take the 13th place.

In the 2014–15 season he qualified to the 2015 European Games after winning the Budapest qualifier.
