= Husayn Rosowsky =

British fencer (born 1991)

Personal information
- Full name: Husayn Rosowsky
- Born: 10 April 1991 (age 35) Sheffield, England

Husayn Rosowsky (born Sheffield, 1991) is a British foil fencer.

== Biography ==
At the 2012 Summer Olympics he competed in the Men's foil, but was defeated in the first round. Husayn also competed in the Men's foil team event, where in the first round Great Britain beat the Egyptian Team, but in the quarter final Team GB lost to Italy.

In 2008, he won an individual bronze medal at the U17 World Championships in Acireale in Sicily. In 2010, he won an individual bronze medal and a team bronze medal in the U20 European Championships in Moscow. In 2010, he was U20 UK National Foil Champion and reached the quarter finals of the World University Games in 2011. Later that year, he won the Leon Paul International in London and won the foil title at the British Fencing Championships. In 2012 he was the UK National Team Foil Champion and reached the quarter finals of the World University Games in 2013. He competed in the Commonwealth Fencing Championships at Largs in November 2014, coming 3rd overall in the individual competition and 1st in the team event.

He represented Great Britain at the following events:

- U17 European Championships in 2007 (Novy Sad, Serbia).
- U17 World Championships in 2007 (Belek, Turkey).
- U17 European Championships in 2008 (Rovigo, Italy).
- U17 World Championships in 2008 (Acireale, Italy)
- U20 European Championships in 2008 (Amsterdam)
- U20 World Championships in 2009 (Belfast, Northern Ireland)
- U20 European Championship in 2009 (Odense, Denmark)
- U20 World Championships in 2010 (Baku, Azerbaijan)
- U20 European Championships in 2010 (Moscow)
- U20 World Championships in 2011 (Amman, Jordan)
- Senior European Championships in 2012 (Legnano, Italy)
- World University Games in 2011 (Szhenzhen, China)
- Olympic Games in 2012 (London)
- World University Games in 2013 (Kazan, Russia)
- Commonwealth Fencing Championships in 2014 (Largs, Scotland)
- Cairo World Cup 2017
- Turin Grand Prix 2017
- Paris World Cup 2018
- Bonn World Cup 2018

== Personal life ==
Husayn was a student at the University of Greenwich where he obtained an undergraduate degree in Mathematics. He pursued a master's degree in Big Data Analytics at the University of Greenwich following the completion of his undergraduate degree. Husayn got married in 2014 and is the father of a daughter.
