= Marcel Marcilloux =

French fencer

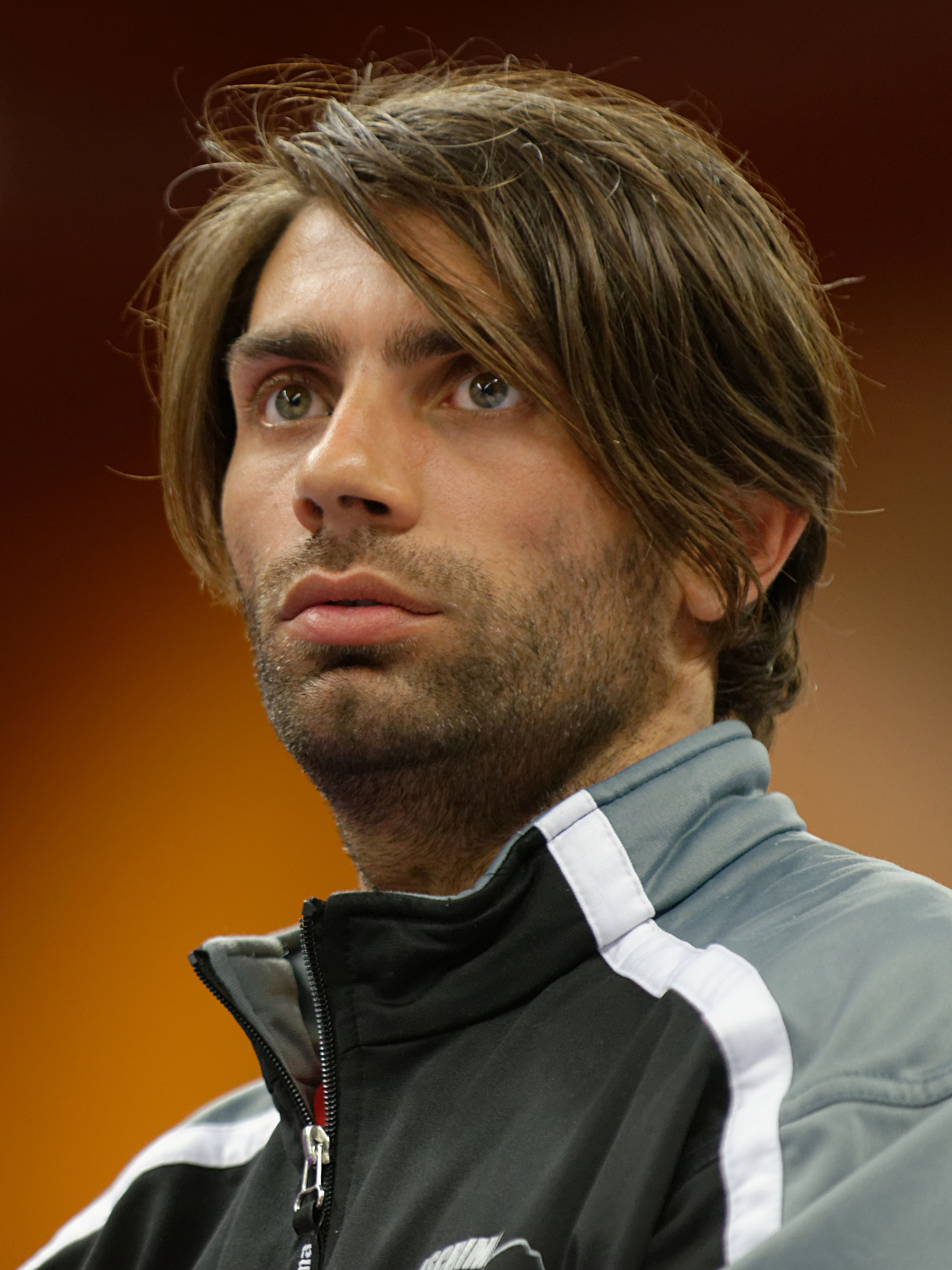
- At the 2013 French Fencing Championships

Personal information
- Born: 13 October 1986 (age 39) Aix-en-Provence
- Height: 1.78 m (5 ft 10 in)
- Weight: 71 kg (157 lb; 11.2 st)

Fencing career
- Sport: Fencing
- Weapon: Foil
- Hand: right-handed
- Club: Escrime du Pays d'Aix
- Retired: 2013
- FIE ranking: current ranking
Medal record
Men's Foil
Representing France
World Championships
| Gold medal – first place | 2006 Turin | Team foil |
| Gold medal – first place | 2007 Saint-Petersburg | Team foil |
| Silver medal – second place | 2011 Catania | Team foil |
| Bronze medal – third place | 2013 Budapest | Team foil |
European Championships
| Silver medal – second place | 2011 Sheffield | Team foil |
| Bronze medal – third place | 2005 Zalaegerszeg | Team foil |
| Bronze medal – third place | 2008 Kiev | Team foil |

Marcel Marcilloux (born 3 October 1980) is a retired French foil fencer, team World champion in 2006 and 2007. He took part in the men's team foil event of the 2012 Summer Olympics. France were defeated in the quarter-finals by the United States and finished 8th.
