= Étienne Lalonde Turbide =

Canadian fencer (born 1989)

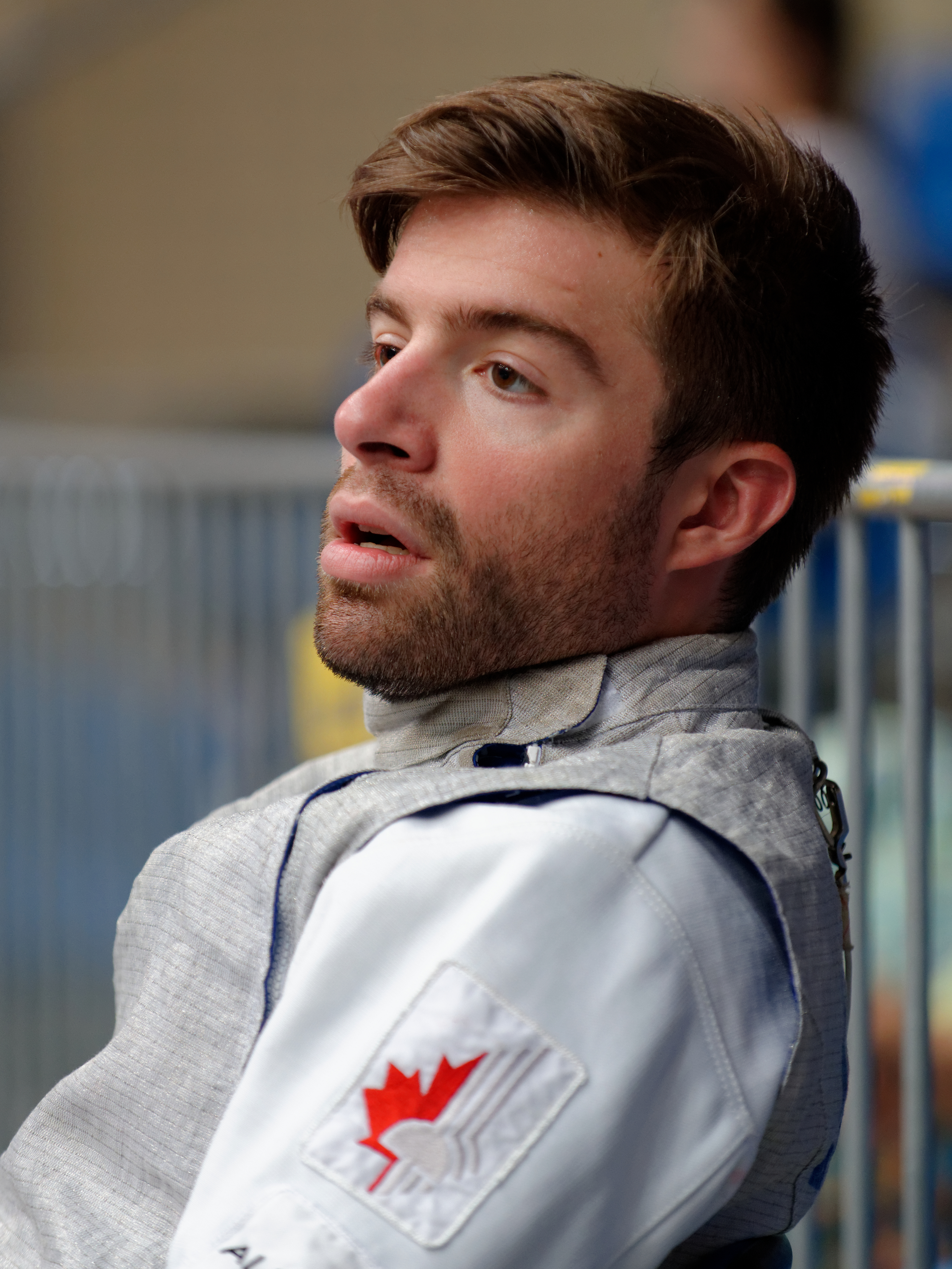

Personal information
- Born: 12 May 1989 (age 37) Verdun, Quebec, Canada
- Home town: Verdun, Quebec
- Height: 1.95 m (6 ft 5 in)
- Weight: 86 kg (190 lb)

Fencing career
- Sport: Fencing
- Country: Canada
- Weapon: Foil
- Hand: right-handed
- Club: Montreal QC
- Personal coach: Giulio Tomassini
- FIE ranking: current ranking
Medal record
Fencing
Representing Canada
Pan American Games
Silver medal – second place	2011 Guadalajara	Team foil
Bronze medal – third place	2011 Guadalajara	Team épée

Étienne Lalonde Turbide (sometimes Lalonde-Turbide, born 12 May 1989) is a Canadian fencer. At the 2012 Summer Olympics he competed in the Men's foil, but was defeated in the second round.
