= Choi Byung-chul =

South Korean fencer (born 1981)

Choi Byung-Chul
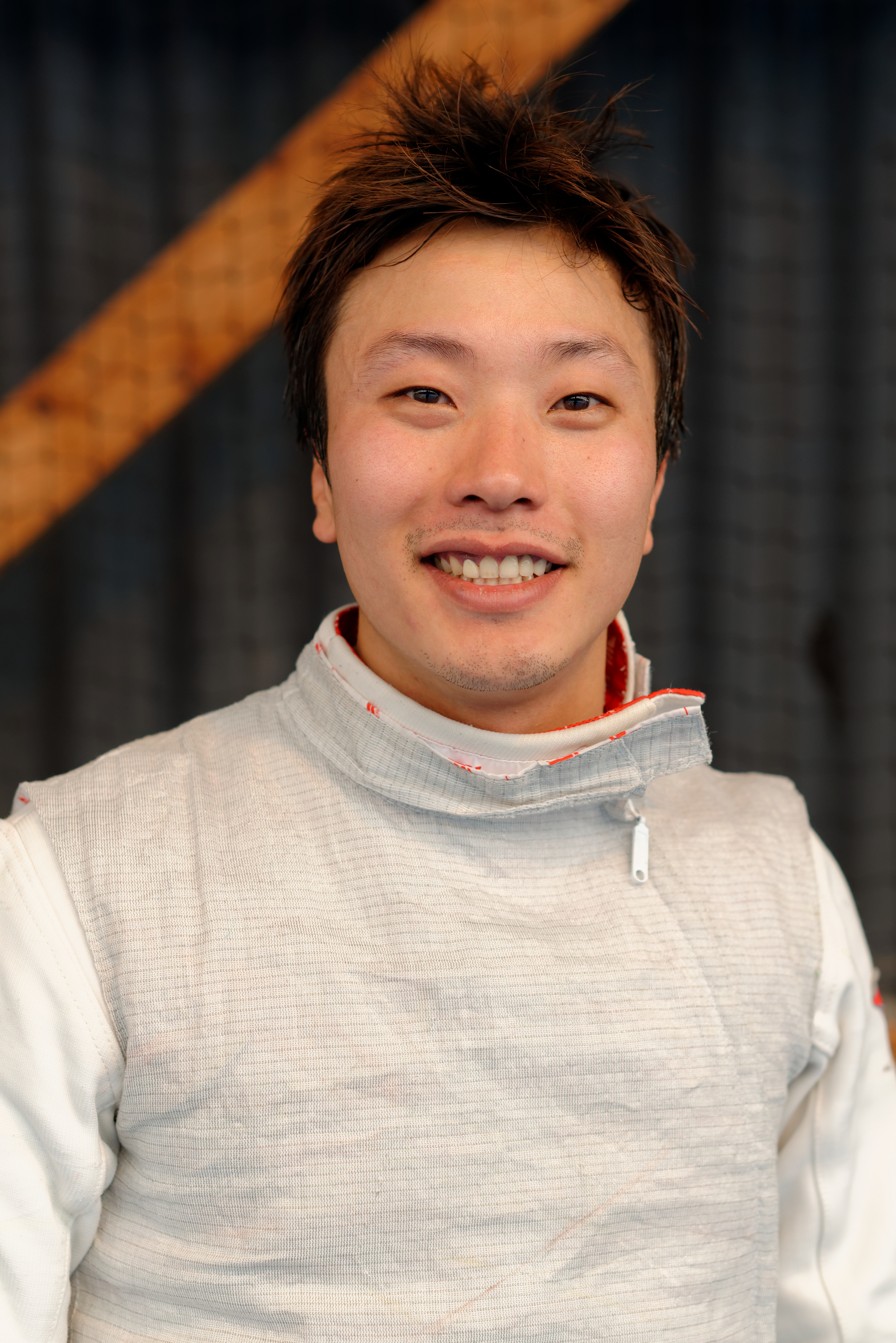
- Choi at the Challenge Revenu 2013

Personal information
- Nickname: Oddball Swordsman (괴짜검객)
- Nationality: South Korean
- Born: 24 October 1981 (age 44)

Sport
- Country: South Korea
- Sport: Fencing
Medal record
Men's fencing
Representing South Korea
Olympic Games
Bronze medal – third place	2012 London	Foil
World Championships
Bronze medal – third place	2007 St. Petersburg	Team foil
Asian Games
Gold medal – first place	2010 Guangzhou	Foil
Silver medal – second place	2006 Doha	Team foil
Bronze medal – third place	2010 Guangzhou	Team foil

Choi Byung-Chul (Korean: 최병철; Hanja: 崔秉哲; Korean pronunciation: [tɕʰwe̞.bjʌŋ.tɕʰʌl]; born October 24, 1981) is a South Korean foil fencer.

Choi made his first major international appearance by winning gold in the individual foil and bronze in the team foil at the 2001 Junior World Fencing Championships. In 2007, he won the bronze medal in the foil team event at the World Fencing Championships in Saint Petersburg, Russia.

Choi qualified for the 2008 Beijing Olympics for the men's individual foil competition. On August 13, 2008, he had a 15–14 loss to the eventual silver medalist Yuki Ota of Japan in the round of 16. Choi then participated in the 2012 London Olympics and on July 31, 2012, he lost to Alaaeldin Abouelkassem in the semi-final, but beat Andrea Baldini in the bronze medal match to finally capture the bronze medal.

== Achievements ==
2007 World Fencing Championships, Team foil
2012 London Olympics, Individual foil
