= Zain Shaito =

American Olympic Fencer (born 1990)

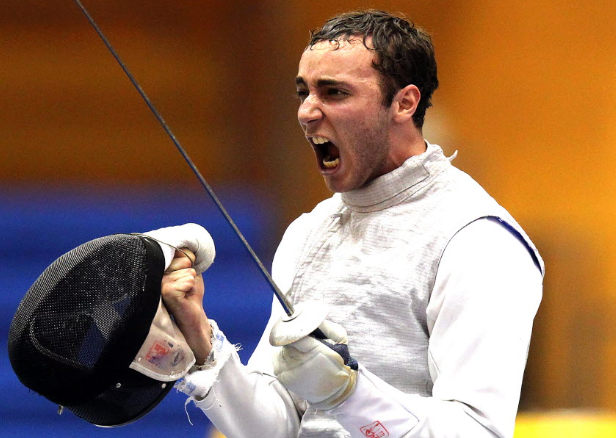
- Shaito qualifying for the Olympic Games

Personal information
- Born: October 19, 1990 (age 36) Dallas, Texas
- Height: 1.89 m (6 ft 2 1/2 in)
- Weight: 88 kg (194 lb)

Sport
- Country: United States
- Sport: Fencing
- Event: Individual Foil
- Coached by: Yury Molchan and Vladimir Nazlymov

Achievements and titles
- National finals: 2012 NCAA National Champion; Two time World Champion
- Updated on 27 March 2021

Zain Shaito is an American Olympic fencer who competed in the individual fencing event at the 2012 Olympic Games, losing to Chinese fencer Zhu Jun.

Shaito, who was on the national Ohio State fencing team, won the individual title in men’s foil at the NCAA Fencing Championships in 2012. He was named the 2011-12 Ohio State Male Athlete of the Year, becoming the second fencer in OSU history to earn the title. Shaito also helped anchor the United States men's junior foil team in 2007 to the first ever World Championship victory. After his Olympic career, he joined the military. Shaito competed in Soldier of the year for Ft. Huachuca and was later attached to JSOC (Joint Special Operations Command).
