= André Weßels =

German fencer

Personal information
- Born: 21 October 1981 (age 44) Recklinghausen, West Germany

Sport
- Country: Germany
- Sport: Fencing
- Event: Foil
- Club: FC Tauberbischofsheim
Medal record
Men's fencing
Representing Germany
Olympic Games
Bronze medal – third place	2012 London	Team foil
European Championships
Bronze medal – third place	2012 Legnano	Team foil

André Weßels (also spelled Wessels; born 21 October 1981) is a German former fencer. He competed in the individual and team foil events at the 2004 Summer Olympics. He also competed at the 2012 Summer Olympics winning a bronze medal in the team foil.
