= Bojan Jovanović =

Croatian fencer (born 1980)

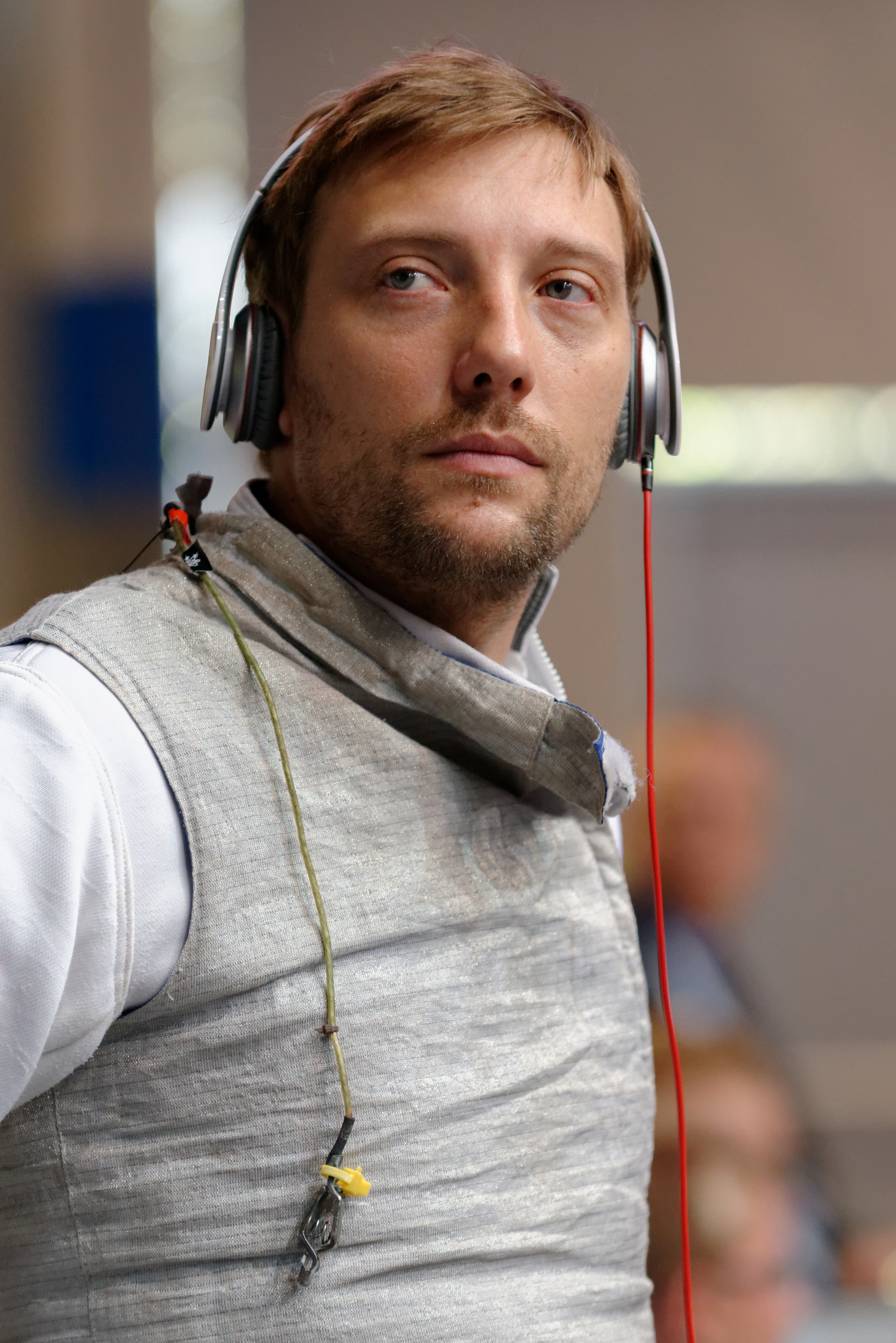
- Jovanović at the 2013 World Fencing Championships

Personal information
- Born: 31 January 1980 (age 46)
- Home town: Zagreb, Croatia
- Height: 1.9 m (6 ft 3 in)
- Weight: 78 kg (172 lb)

Fencing career
- Sport: Fencing
- Weapon: foil
- Hand: right-handed
- FIE ranking: current ranking

Bojan Jovanović (born 31 January 1980) is a Croatian fencer. At the 2012 Summer Olympics held in London, United Kingdom, he competed in the men's foil, but was defeated in the first round.
