= Valerio Aspromonte =

Italian fencer (born 1987)

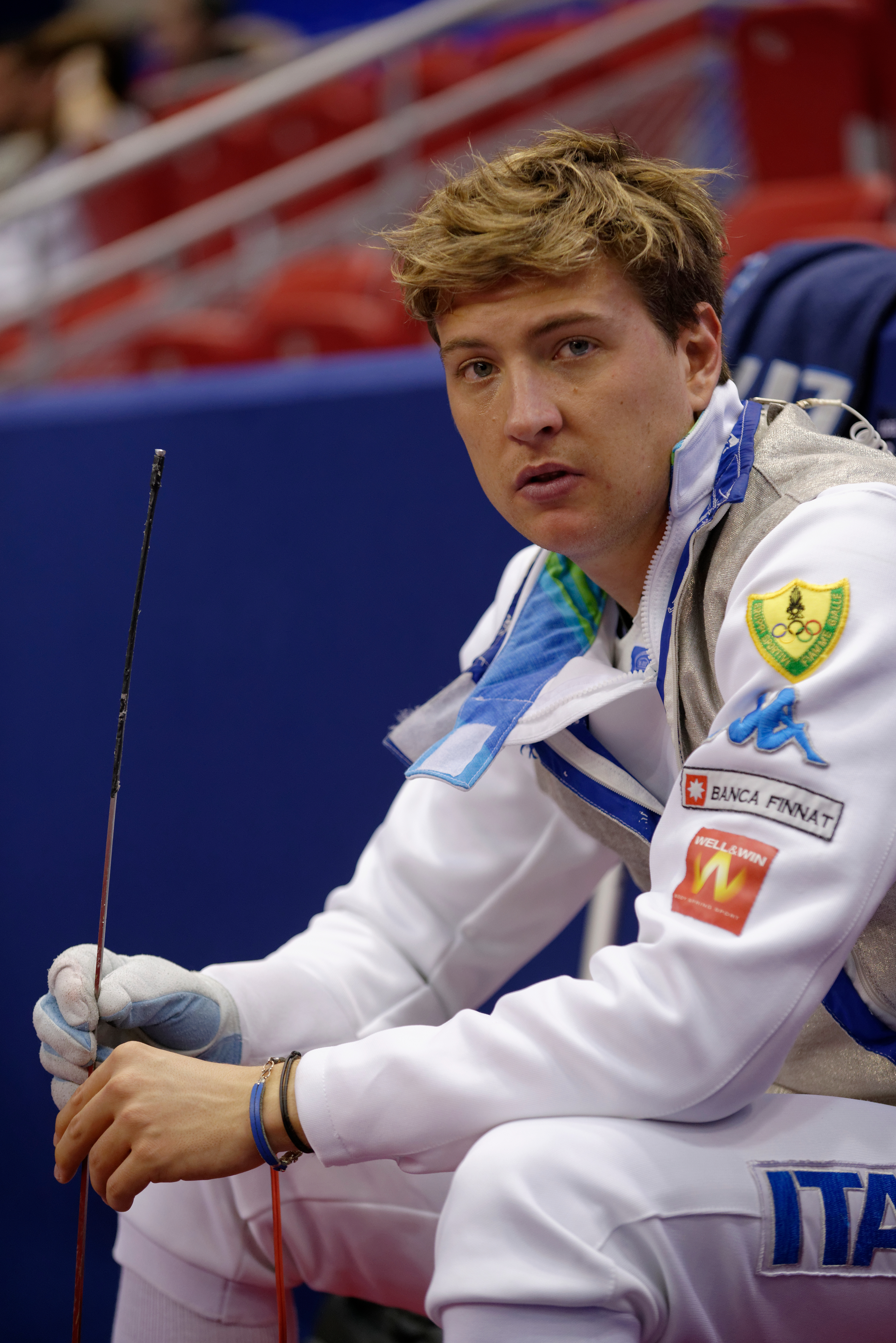
- Aspromonte at the 2014 Paris World Cup

Personal information
- Born: 16 March 1987 (age 39) Rome, Italy
- Height: 1.87 m (6 ft 1 1/2 in)
- Weight: 84 kg (185 lb; 13.2 st)

Fencing career
- Sport: Fencing
- Country: Italy
- Weapon: Foil
- Hand: Right-handed
- Club: GS Fiamme Gialle
- FIE ranking: current ranking

Valerio Aspromonte (born 16 March 1987) is an Italian right-handed foil fencer, three-time team European champion, 2013 team world champion, and 2012 team Olympic champion.

== Medal Record ==
=== Olympic Games ===
| Year | Location | Event | Position |
|---|---|---|---|
| 2012 | London, United Kingdom | Team Men's Foil | 1st |

=== World Championship ===
| Year | Location | Event | Position |
|---|---|---|---|
| 2010 | Paris, France | Team Men's Foil | 2nd |
| 2011 | Catania, Italy | Individual Men's Foil | 2nd |
| 2013 | Budapest, Hungary | Individual Men's Foil | 3rd |
| 2013 | Budapest, Hungary | Team Men's Foil | 1st |
| 2014 | Kazan, Russia | Team Men's Foil | 3rd |

=== European Championship ===
| Year | Location | Event | Position |
|---|---|---|---|
| 2010 | Leipzig, Germany | Individual Men's Foil | 2nd |
| 2010 | Leipzig, Germany | Team Men's Foil | 1st |
| 2011 | Sheffield, United Kingdom | Team Men's Foil | 1st |
| 2012 | Legnano, Italy | Team Men's Foil | 1st |
| 2014 | Strasbourg, France | Team Men's Foil | 2nd |

=== Grand Prix ===
| Date | Location | Event | Position |
|---|---|---|---|
| 05/08/2009 | Tokyo, Japan | Individual Men's Foil | 3rd |
| 04/30/2010 | Shanghai, China | Individual Men's Foil | 3rd |
| 05/14/2010 | Tokyo, Japan | Individual Men's Foil | 2nd |
| 03/05/2011 | Venice, Italy | Individual Men's Foil | 1st |
| 06/01/2012 | St. Petersburg, Russia | Individual Men's Foil | 3rd |
| 03/04/2013 | St. Petersburg, Russia | Individual Men's Foil | 3rd |
| 03/01/2014 | St. Petersburg, Russia | Individual Men's Foil | 3rd |
| 11/28/2014 | Turin, Italy | Individual Men's Foil | 3rd |

=== World Cup ===
| Date | Location | Event | Position |
|---|---|---|---|
| 01/05/2008 | Copenhagen, Denmark | Individual Men's Foil | 2nd |
| 02/27/2010 | Bonn, Germany | Individual Men's Foil | 1st |
| 03/20/2010 | Sharm El Sheikh, Egypt | Individual Men's Foil | 3rd |
| 02/17/2012 | A Coruña, Spain | Individual Men's Foil | 3rd |
| 06/29/2012 | Havana, Cuba | Individual Men's Foil | 3rd |
