= Men's foil at the 2015 World Fencing Championships =

The Men's foil event of the 2015 World Fencing Championships was held on 16 July 2015. The qualification was held on 15 July 2015.

== Medalists ==
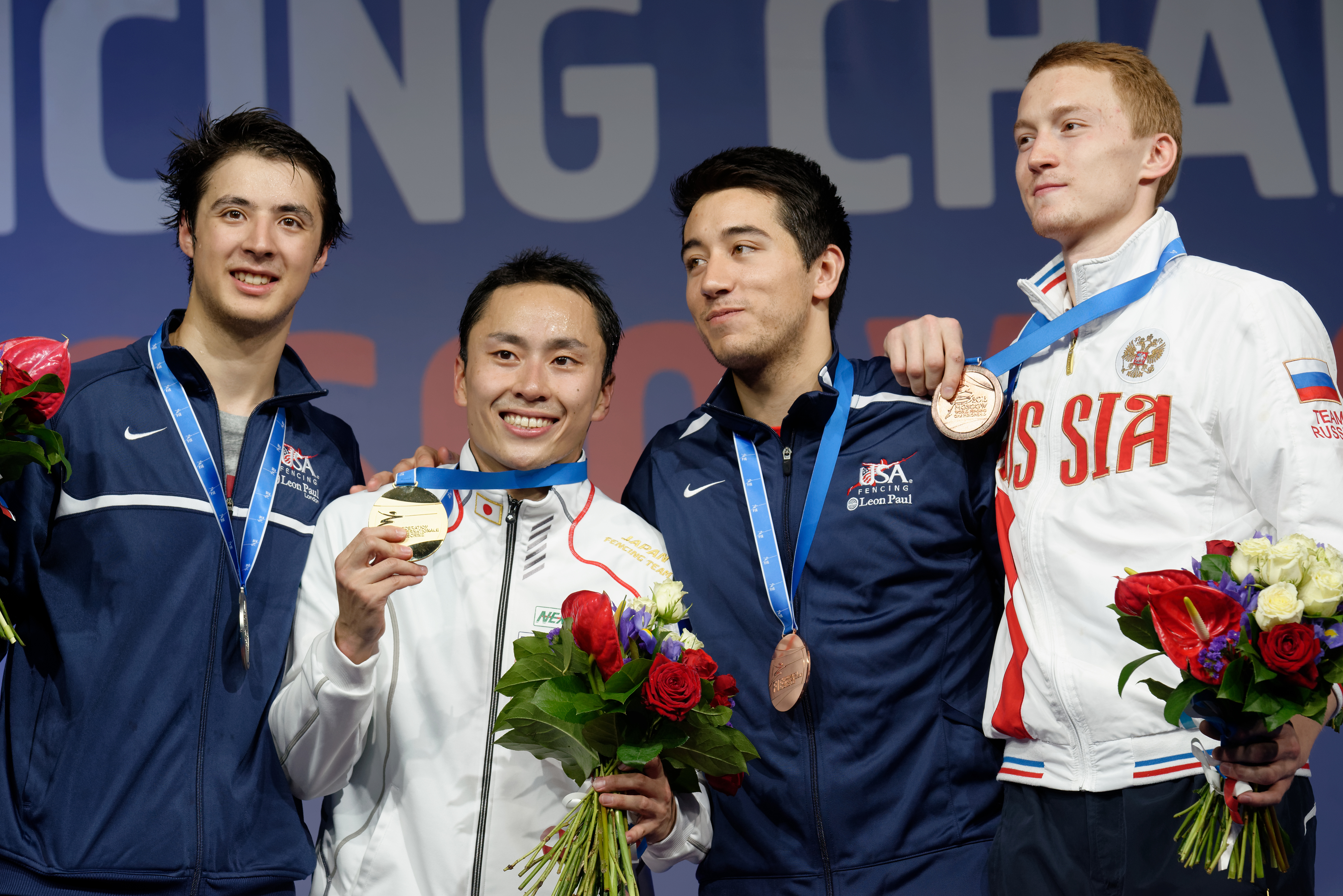
From left to right, Alexander Massialas, Yuki Ota, Gerek Meinhardt and Artur Akhmatkhuzin

Gold	(Japan) Yuki Ota
Silver	(United States) Alexander Massialas
Bronze	(Russia) Artur Akhmatkhuzin
Bronze	(United States) Gerek Meinhardt

== Draw ==
=== Finals ===
Semi-finals
(Russia) Artur Akhmatkhuzin	10
(United States) Alexander Massialas	15
(United States) Gerek Meinhardt	8
(Japan) Yuki Ota	15

Final
(United States) Alexander Massialas	10
(Japan) Yuki Ota	15

=== Top half ===
==== Section 1 ====
Round of 64
1	(Russia) Dmitry Rigin	15
64	(Czech Republic) Václav Kundera	3
33	(France) Jérémy Cadot	15
32	(Hungary) Dániel Dósa	10
17	(Poland) Leszek Rajski	5
48	(South Korea) Heo Jun	15
49	(Turkey) Martino Minuto	9
16	(Italy) Giorgio Avola	15
9	(France) Enzo Lefort	15
56	(Hong Kong) Cheung Siu Lun	4
41	(Hong Kong) Nicholas Choi	12
24	(Russia) Artur Akhmatkhuzin	15
25	(South Korea) Ha Tae-gyu	15
40	(Kazakhstan) Eduard Grigoryev	11
57	(Hong Kong) Yeung Chi Ka	6
8	(China) Ma Jianfei	15

Round of 32
1	(Russia) Dmitry Rigin	12
33	(France) Jérémy Cadot	15
48	(South Korea) Heo Jun	14
16	(Italy) Giorgio Avola	13
9	(France) Enzo Lefort	12
24	(Russia) Artur Akhmatkhuzin	15
25	(South Korea) Ha Tae-gyu	10
8	(China) Ma Jianfei	15

Round of 16
33	(France) Jérémy Cadot	15
48	(South Korea) Heo Jun	14
24	(Russia) Artur Akhmatkhuzin	15
8	(China) Ma Jianfei	12

Quarterfinals
33	(France) Jérémy Cadot	7
24	(Russia) Artur Akhmatkhuzin	15

==== Section 2 ====
Round of 64
5	(United States) Alexander Massialas	15
60	(Austria) Moritz Hinterseer	4
37	(France) Erwann Le Péchoux	11
28	(United Kingdom) Richard Kruse	15
21	(China) Chen Haiwei	15
44	(Japan) Kenta Chida	12
53	(Austria) Rene Pranz	9
12	(United Kingdom) James-Andrew Davis	15
13	(South Korea) Son Young-ki	15
52	(Austria) Johannes Poscharing	8
45	(Spain) Carlos Llavador	14
20	(United Kingdom) Laurence Halsted	15
29	(Australia) Lucas Webber	12
36	(Romania) Radu Dărăban	15
61	(Belarus) Uladzislau Lahunou	5
4	(Italy) Andrea Cassarà	15

Round of 32
5	(United States) Alexander Massialas	15
28	(United Kingdom) Richard Kruse	11
21	(China) Chen Haiwei	15
12	(United Kingdom) James-Andrew Davis	5
13	(South Korea) Son Young-ki	9
20	(United Kingdom) Laurence Halsted	15
36	(Romania) Radu Dărăban	15
4	(Italy) Andrea Cassarà	14

Round of 16
5	(United States) Alexander Massialas	15
21	(China) Chen Haiwei	6
20	(United Kingdom) Laurence Halsted	15
36	(Romania) Radu Dărăban	7

Quarterfinals
5	(United States) Alexander Massialas	15
20	(United Kingdom) Laurence Halsted	12

=== Bottom half ===
==== Section 3 ====
Round of 64
3	(Russia) Aleksey Cheremisinov	15
62	(Poland) Michal Janda	5
35	(France) Vincent Simon	15
30	(Belarus) Siarhei Byk	9
19	(Egypt) Alaaeldin Abouelkassem	14
46	(Canada) Eli Schenkel	15
51	(Croatia) Petar Fileš	5
14	(United States) Gerek Meinhardt	15
11	(United States) Miles Chamley-Watson	12
54	(Germany) Peter Joppich	15
42	(Russia) Dmitry Zherebchenko	12
22	(Germany) Sebastian Bachmann	15
27	(Brazil) Ghislain Perrier	10
38	(Japan) Daiki Fujino	15
59	(Tunisia) Mohamed Samandi	13
6	(Italy) Daniele Garozzo	15

Round of 32
3	(Russia) Aleksey Cheremisinov	15
35	(France) Vincent Simon	10
46	(Canada) Eli Schenkel	1
14	(United States) Gerek Meinhardt	15
54	(Germany) Peter Joppich	12
22	(Germany) Sebastian Bachmann	11
38	(Japan) Daiki Fujino	12
6	(Italy) Daniele Garozzo	15

Round of 16
3	(Russia) Aleksey Cheremisinov	7
14	(United States) Gerek Meinhardt	15
54	(Germany) Peter Joppich	15
6	(Italy) Daniele Garozzo	11

Quarterfinals
14	(United States) Gerek Meinhardt	15
54	(Germany) Peter Joppich	10

==== Section 4 ====
Round of 64
7	(Japan) Yuki Ota	15
58	(Mexico) Raúl Arizaga	3
39	(Israel) Tomer Or	13
26	(South Korea) Kwon Young-ho	12
23	(Tunisia) Mohamed Ayoub Ferjani	15
42	(Denmark) Alexander Tsoronis	10
55	(Hong Kong) Cheung Ka Long	15
10	(Czech Republic) Alexander Choupenitch	11
15	(Italy) Edoardo Luperi	15
50	(China) Li Chen	9
47	(Canada) Maximilien Van Haaster	11
18	(China) Lei Sheng	15
31	(Ukraine) Andrii Pogrebniak	15
34	(Japan) Kyosuke Matsuyama	5
63	(Ukraine) Rostyslav Hertsyk	7
2	(United States) Race Imboden	15

Round of 32
7	(Japan) Yuki Ota	15
39	(Israel) Tomer Or	6
23	(Tunisia) Mohamed Ayoub Ferjani	5
55	(Hong Kong) Cheung Ka Long	15
15	(Italy) Edoardo Luperi	5
18	(China) Lei Sheng	15
31	(Ukraine) Andrii Pogrebniak	9
2	(United States) Race Imboden	15

Round of 16
7	(Japan) Yuki Ota	15
55	(Hong Kong) Cheung Ka Long	12
18	(China) Lei Sheng	15
2	(United States) Race Imboden	6

Quarterfinals
7	(Japan) Yuki Ota	15
18	(China) Lei Sheng	9
