= Men's foil at the 2013 World Fencing Championships =

The Men's foil event of the 2013 World Fencing Championships was held on August 9, 2013. The qualification was held on August 6, 2013.

== Medalists ==
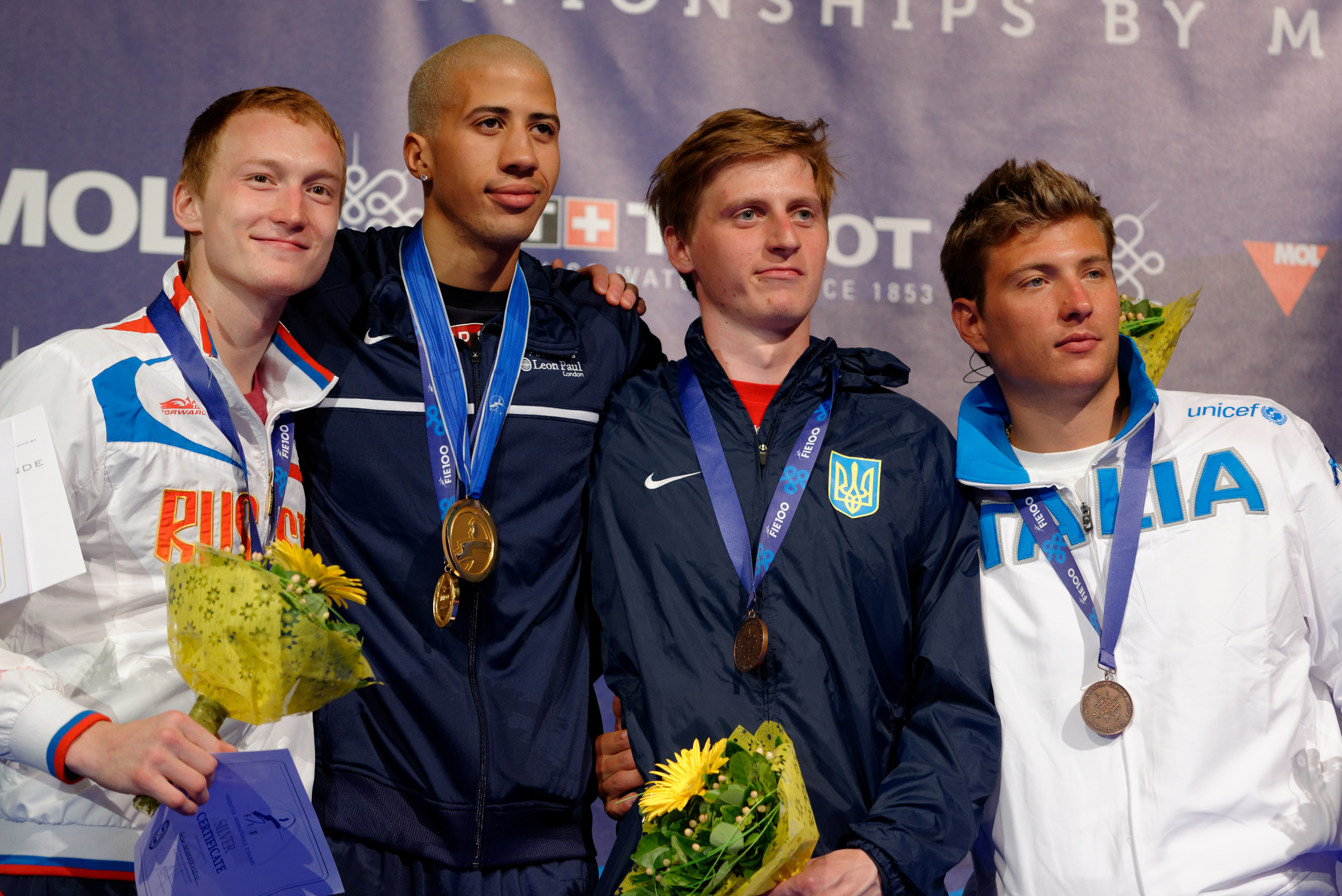
On the podium: from left to right, Artur Akhmatkhuzin, Miles Chamley-Watson, Rostyslav Hertsyk, and Valerio Aspromonte

| Gold | Miles Chamley-Watson (USA) |
| Silver | Artur Akhmatkhuzin (RUS) |
| Bronze | Rostyslav Hertsyk (UKR) |
| Bronze | Valerio Aspromonte (ITA) |

== Draw ==
=== Finals ===
Semi-finals
18:30
(Ukraine) Rostyslav Hertsyk | 10
(Russia) Artur Akhmatkhuzin | 15
18:55
(United States) Miles Chamley-Watson | 15
(Italy) Valerio Aspromonte | 9

Final
20:30
(Russia) Artur Akhmatkhuzin | 6
(United States) Miles Chamley-Watson | 15

=== Top half ===
==== Section 1 ====
Round of 64
1 | (Italy) Andrea Cassarà | 15
64 | (Hungary) Bence Széki | 9
33 | (Poland) Michał Majewski | 10
32 | (South Korea) Kim Min-kyu | 15
17 | (United Kingdom) Richard Kruse | 14
48 | (France) Julien Mertine | 15
49 | (Venezuela) Cesar Bru | 5
16 | (South Korea) Heo Jun | 15
9 | (United States) Race Imboden | 15
56 | (Hong Kong) Yeung Chi Ka | 12
41 | (France) Jérémy Cadot | 15
24 | (Germany) Marius Braun | 6
25 | (Ukraine) Rostyslav Hertsyk | 15
40 | (Venezuela) Antonio Leal | 8
57 | (Israel) Tomer Or | 12
8 | (Germany) Peter Joppich | 15

Round of 32
1 | (Italy) Andrea Cassarà | 15
32 | (South Korea) Kim Min-kyu | 14
48 | (France) Julien Mertine | 11
16 | (South Korea) Heo Jun | 15
9 | (United States) Race Imboden | 15
41 | (France) Jérémy Cadot | 7
25 | (Ukraine) Rostyslav Hertsyk | 15
8 | (Germany) Peter Joppich | 11

Round of 16
1 | (Italy) Andrea Cassarà | 15
16 | (South Korea) Heo Jun | 6
9 | (United States) Race Imboden | 10
25 | (Ukraine) Rostyslav Hertsyk | 15

Quarterfinals
1 | (Italy) Andrea Cassarà | 14
25 | (Ukraine) Rostyslav Hertsyk | 15

==== Section 2 ====
Round of 64
5 | (Russia) Artur Akhmatkhuzin | 15
60 | (Denmark) Alexander Tsoronis | 6
37 | (Japan) Suguru Awaji | 15
28 | (Belarus) Siarhei Byk | 5
21 | (South Korea) Ha Tae-gyu | 11
44 | (Hong Kong) Choi Nicholas Edward | 15
53 | (Brazil) Guilherme Toldo | 2
12 | (Egypt) Alaaeldin Abouelkassem | 15
13 | (China) Lei Sheng | 15
52 | (France) Marcel Marcilloux | 12
45 | (Czech Republic) Vaclav Kundera | 12
20 | (Poland) Leszek Rajski | 15
29 | (Austria) Rene Pranz | 8
36 | (Ukraine) Andriy Pohrebnyak | 15
61 | (China) Sun Bin | 9
4 | (United States) Gerek Meinhardt | 15

Round of 32
5 | (Russia) Artur Akhmatkhuzin | 15
37 | (Japan) Suguru Awaji | 11
44 | (Hong Kong) Choi Nicholas Edward | 13
12 | (Egypt) Alaaeldin Abouelkassem | 15
13 | (China) Lei Sheng | 15
20 | (Poland) Leszek Rajski | 8
36 | (Ukraine) Andriy Pohrebnyak | 13
4 | (United States) Gerek Meinhardt | 15

Round of 16
5 | (Russia) Artur Akhmatkhuzin | 15
12 | (Egypt) Alaaeldin Abouelkassem | 13
13 | (China) Lei Sheng | 15
4 | (United States) Gerek Meinhardt | 14

Quarterfinals
5 | (Russia) Artur Akhmatkhuzin | 15
13 | (China) Lei Sheng | 10

=== Bottom half ===
==== Section 3 ====
Round of 64
3 | (Russia) Aleksey Cheremisinov | 15
62 | (Ukraine) Klod Yunes | 7
35 | (Russia) Aleksey Khovanskiy | 15
30 | (Greece) Theodoros Nakis | 11
19 | (United States) Miles Chamley-Watson | 15
46 | (Croatia) Bojan Jovanović | 12
51 | (Hungary) Róbert Gátai | 7
14 | (Italy) Giorgio Avola | 15
11 | (China) Ma Jianfei | 15
54 | (Hungary) Gábor Szabados | 14
43 | (Russia) Artem Sedov | 14
22 | (South Korea) Son Young-Ki | 15
27 | (Austria) Dominik Wohlgemuth | 5
38 | (Germany) Sebastian Bachmann | 15
59 | (Singapore) Tan Yuan Zi | 4
6 | (United Kingdom) James-Andrew Davis | 15

Round of 32
3 | (Russia) Aleksey Cheremisinov | 15
35 | (Russia) Aleksey Khovanskiy | 9
19 | (United States) Miles Chamley-Watson | 15
14 | (Italy) Giorgio Avola | 14
11 | (China) Ma Jianfei | 11
22 | (South Korea) Son Young-Ki | 15
38 | (Germany) Sebastian Bachmann | 15
6 | (United Kingdom) James-Andrew Davis | 11

Round of 16
3 | (Russia) Aleksey Cheremisinov | 14
19 | (United States) Miles Chamley-Watson | 15
22 | (South Korea) Son Young-Ki | 11
38 | (Germany) Sebastian Bachmann | 15

Quarterfinals
19 | (United States) Miles Chamley-Watson | 15
38 | (Germany) Sebastian Bachmann | 14

==== Section 4 ====
Round of 64
7 | (Italy) Valerio Aspromonte | 15
58 | (Hungary) Kristóf Szabados | 8
39 | (Israel) Maor Hatoel | 12
26 | (Egypt) Tarek Ayad | 15
23 | (France) Erwann Le Péchoux | 15
42 | (Canada) Anthony Prymack | 5
55 | (Poland) Pawel Kawiecki | 9
10 | (United States) Alexander Massialas | 15
15 | (Japan) Ryo Miyake | 13
50 | (Hong Kong) Cheung Siu Lun | 15
47 | (Germany) Johann Gustinelli | 9
18 | (Japan) Daiki Fujino | 15
31 | (Czech Republic) Alexander Choupenitch | 11
34 | (Japan) Kenta Chida | 15
63 | (Turkey) Tevfik Burak Babaoğlu | 6
2 | (Italy) Andrea Baldini | 15

Round of 32
7 | (Italy) Valerio Aspromonte | 15
26 | (Egypt) Tarek Ayad | 10
23 | (France) Erwann Le Péchoux | 9
10 | (United States) Alexander Massialas | 15
50 | (Hong Kong) Cheung Siu Lun | 15
18 | (Japan) Daiki Fujino | 13
34 | (Japan) Kenta Chida | 15
2 | (Italy) Andrea Baldini | 11

Round of 16
7 | (Italy) Valerio Aspromonte | 15
10 | (United States) Alexander Massialas | 14
50 | (Hong Kong) Cheung Siu Lun | 15
34 | (Japan) Kenta Chida | 10

Quarterfinals
7 | (Italy) Valerio Aspromonte | 15
50 | (Hong Kong) Cheung Siu Lun | 6

== Final classification ==
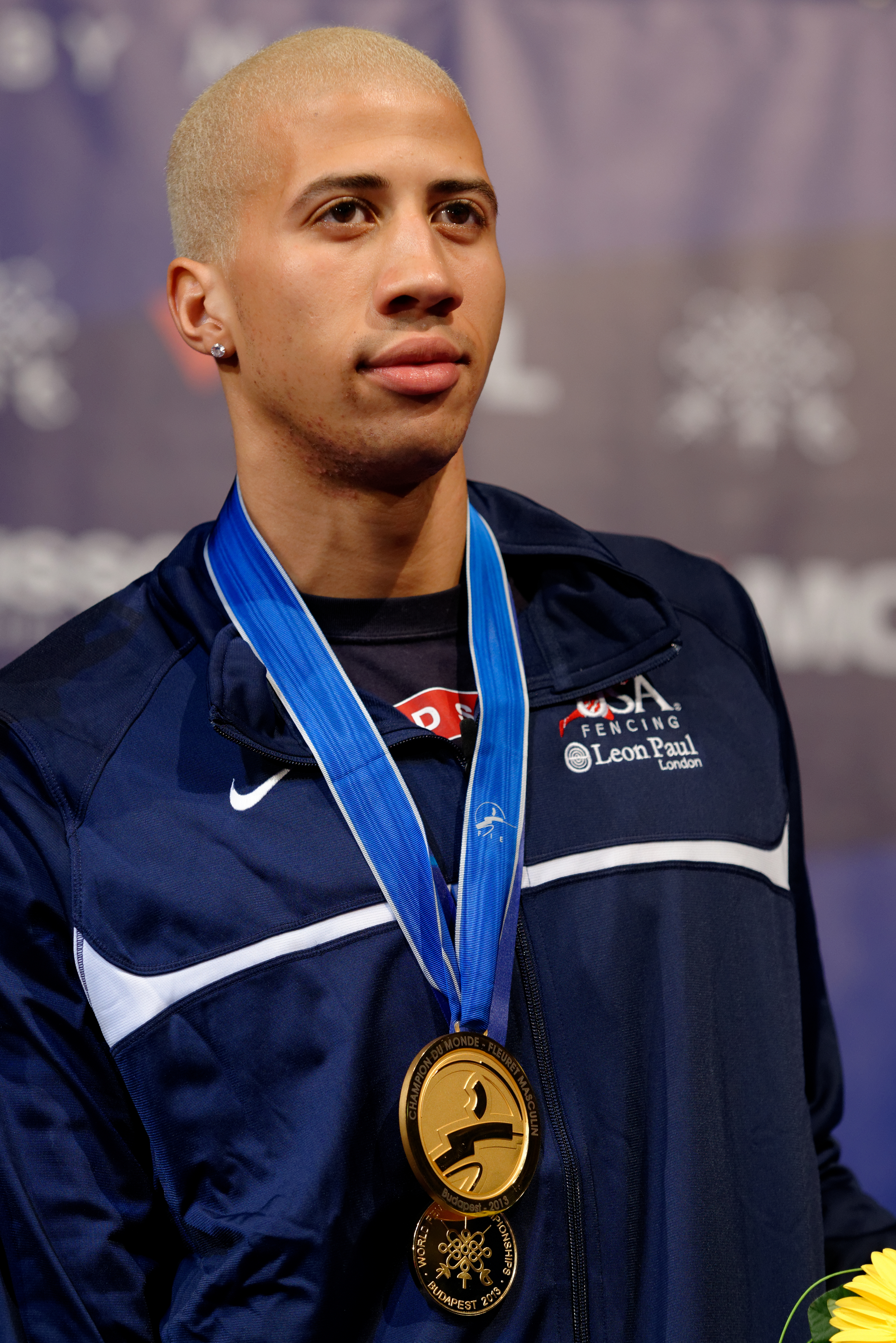
2013 world champion Miles Chamley-Watson

| Rank | Athlete | Nation |
|---|---|---|
| 1st place, gold medalist(s) | Miles Chamley-Watson | United States |
| 2nd place, silver medalist(s) | Artur Akhmatkhuzin | Russia |
| 3rd place, bronze medalist(s) | Valerio Aspromonte | Italy |
| 3rd place, bronze medalist(s) | Rostyslav Hertsyk | Ukraine |
| 5 | Andrea Cassarà | Italy |
| 6 | Lei Sheng | China |
| 7 | Sebastian Bachmann | Germany |
| 8 | Cheung Siu Lun | Hong Kong |
| 9 | Aleksey Cheremisinov | Russia |
| 10 | Gerek Meinhardt | United States |
| 11 | Alexander Massialas | United States |
| 12 | Race Imboden | United States |
| 13 | Alaaeldin Abouelkassem | Egypt |
| 14 | Heo Jun | South Korea |
| 15 | Son Young-ki | South Korea |
| 16 | Kenta Chida | Japan |
| 17 | Andrea Baldini | Italy |
| 18 | James-Andrew Davis | Great Britain |
| 19 | Peter Joppich | Germany |
| 20 | Ma Jianfei | China |
| 21 | Giorgio Avola | Italy |
| 22 | Daiki Fujino | Japan |
| 22 | Leszek Rajski | Poland |
| 24 | Erwann Le Péchoux | France |
| 25 | Tarek Ayad | Egypt |
| 26 | Kim Min-kyu | South Korea |
| 27 | Aleksey Khovanskiy | Russia |
| 28 | Andrii Pogrebniak | Ukraine |
| 29 | Suguru Awaji | Japan |
| 30 | Jérémy Cadot | France |
| 31 | Choi Nicholas Edward | Hong Kong |
| 32 | Julien Mertine | France |
| 33 | Rio Miyake | Japan |
| 34 | Richard Kruse | Great Britain |
| 35 | Ha Taegyu | South Korea |
| 36 | Marius Braun | Germany |
| 37 | Dominik Wohlgemuth | Austria |
| 38 | Siarhei Byk | Belarus |
| 39 | René Pranz | Austria |
| 40 | Theodoros Nakis | Greece |
| 41 | Alexander Choupenitch | Czech Republic |
| 42 | Michał Majewski | Poland |
| 43 | Maor Hatoel | Israel |
| 43 | Antonio Leal | Venezuela |
| 45 | Anthony Prymack | Canada |
| 46 | Artem Sedov | Russia |
| 47 | Václav Kundera | Czech Republic |
| 48 | Bojan Jovanović | Croatia |
| 49 | Johann Gustinelli | Germany |
| 50 | César Bru | Venezuela |
| 51 | Róbert Gátai | Hungary |
| 52 | Marcel Marcilloux | France |
| 53 | Gábor Szabados | Hungary |
| 53 | Guilherme Toldo | Brazil |
| 55 | Paweł Kawiecki | Poland |
| 56 | Yeung Chi Ka | Hong Kong |
| 57 | Tomer Or | Israel |
| 58 | Kristóf Szabados | Hungary |
| 59 | Tan Yuan Zi | Singapore |
| 60 | Alexander Tsoronis | Denmark |
| 61 | Sun Bin | China |
| 62 | Klod Yunes | Ukraine |
| 63 | Tevfik Furak Babaoğlu | Turkey |
| 64 | Bence Széki | Hungary |
| 65 | Volodymyr Koltygo | Ukraine |
| 66 | Daniel Gómez | Mexico |
| 67 | Li Hua | China |
| 68 | Søren Ulrik Johansen | Denmark |
| 69 | Aliaksandr Chaliankov | Belarus |
| 70 | Luka Gaganidze | Georgia |
| 71 | Moritz Hinterseer | Austria |
| 72 | Hans-Joachim Lecocq | Belgium |
| 73 | Alireza Adhami | Iran |
| 74 | Idan Czuckermann | Israel |
| 75 | David Gómez | Mexico |
| 76 | Marcus Mepstead | Great Britain |
| 77 | Ali Fadel Abbas | Kuwait |
| 78 | Nikolaos Kontochristopoulos | Greece |
| 79 | Yaser Mohammad | Kuwait |
| 80 | Ivan Komšić | Croatia |
| 81 | Étienne Lalonde-Turbide | Canada |
| 82 | Gael Santos | Portugal |
| 83 | Keith Cook | Great Britain |
| 84 | Mohamed Essam | Egypt |
| 85 | Eduard Grigoryev | Kazakhstan |
| 86 | Chu Wing Hong | Hong Kong |
| 87 | Johannes Poscharnig | Austria |
| 88 | Dimitri Patrik Clairet Roa | Colombia |
| 89 | Maximilien Van Haaster | Canada |
| 90 | Yauheni Ulasik | Belarus |
| 91 | Felipe Guillermo Saucedo | Argentina |
| 92 | Sanphot Nuanphlap | Thailand |
| 93 | Jiří Kurfürst | Czech Republic |
| 94 | Panagiotis Teliporanidis | Greece |
| 95 | Felipe Alvear | Chile |
| 96 | Fernando Scavasin | Brazil |
| 97 | Radosław Glonek | Poland |
| 98 | Andrés Villalobos | Peru |
| 99 | Rory Chisholm | Canada |
| 100 | Aliaksandr Lukashevich | Belarus |
| 100 | Thanapun Phakungkoon | Thailand |
| 102 | Jan Krejčík | Czech Republic |
| 103 | Carlos Llavador | Spain |
| 104 | Lim Joshua Ian | Singapore |
| 105 | Octavio Martínez Ramírez | Mexico |
| 106 | Alejandro Hernández Vásquez | Colombia |
| 107 | Bora İsmail Biren | Turkey |
| 108 | Patrick Jørgensen | Denmark |
| 109 | Hendrawa Susanto | Indonesia |
| 110 | José López González | Guatemala |
| 111 | Zhang Zheng Gang | Singapore |
| 112 | Batsuuri Battumur | Mongolia |
| 113 | Naser Al-Walid | Kuwait |
| 114 | Luis Núñez | Venezuela |
| 115 | Jeronimo Machado | Brazil |
| 116 | Serghei Petrusenco | Moldova |
| 117 | Emil Ulrik Andersen | Denmark |
| 118 | Heitor Shimbo | Brazil |
| 119 | Thanig Vichaidist | Thailand |
| 120 | Luka Antončič | Slovenia |
| 121 | Simon Capon | Australia |
| 121 | Paul Vincent Borg | Malta |
| 123 | Aklesso Aguenam | Togo |
| 124 | Hadi Özgürkan | Turkey |
