= Fencing at 2013 World Combat Games – Men's Foil Individual =

2013 Sporting event in Russia

The Men's Foil event of the 2013 World Combat Games was held in Saint Petersburg, Russia on 26 October.

== Medalists ==
Gold	Silver	Bronze
Richard Kruse (GBR)	Race Imboden (USA)	Artur Akhmatkhuzin (RUS)

== Athlete List ==
- (Canada) Maximilien Van Haaster
- (China) Ma Jianfei
- (France) Erwann Le Péchoux
- (United Kingdom) Richard Kruse
- (Germany) Peter Joppich
- (Egypt) Alaaeldin Abouelkassem
- (United Kingdom) James-Andrew Davis
- (Italy) Andrea Cassarà
- (Italy) Andrea Baldini
- (South Korea) Heo Jun
- (Hong Kong) Cheung Siu Lun
- (Russia) Artur Akhmatkhuzin
- (Russia) Aleksey Cheremisinov
- (Ukraine) Rostyslav Hertsyk
- (United States) Miles Chamley-Watson
- (United States) Race Imboden

== Results ==
Round of 16
(Canada) Maximilien Van Haaster	5
(Russia) Artur Akhmatkhuzin	15
(Germany) Peter Joppich	15
(South Korea) Heo Jun	11
(United Kingdom) Richard Kruse	15
(Italy) Andrea Baldini	12
(Russia) Aleksey Cheremisinov	15
(China) Ma Jianfei	12
(Hong Kong) Cheung Siu Lun	9
(United States) Miles Chamley-Watson	15
(United Kingdom) James-Andrew Davis	7
(France) Erwann Le Péchoux	15
(Ukraine) Rostyslav Hertsyk	9
(United States) Race Imboden	15
(Italy) Andrea Cassarà	9
(Egypt) Alaaeldin Abouelkassem	15

Quarterfinals
(Russia) Artur Akhmatkhuzin	15
(Germany) Peter Joppich	14
(United Kingdom) Richard Kruse	15
(Russia) Aleksey Cheremisinov	12
(United States) Miles Chamley-Watson	15
(France) Erwann Le Péchoux	9
(United States) Race Imboden	15
(Egypt) Alaaeldin Abouelkassem	6

Semifinals
(Russia) Artur Akhmatkhuzin	10
(United Kingdom) Richard Kruse	15
(United States) Miles Chamley-Watson	3
(United States) Race Imboden	15

Final
(United Kingdom) Richard Kruse	15
(United States) Race Imboden	4

Third place
(United States) Miles Chamley-Watson	12
(Russia) Artur Akhmatkhuzin	15
