= Men's team foil at the 2017 World Fencing Championships =

2017 World Fencing Championships

- Venue: Arena Leipzig
- Location: Leipzig, Germany
- Dates: 26 July

Medalists
gold medal	Giorgio Avola; Andrea Cassarà; Alessio Foconi; Daniele Garozzo	Italy
silver medal	Miles Chamley-Watson; Race Imboden; Alexander Massialas; Gerek Meinhardt	United States
bronze medal	Jérémy Cadot; Enzo Lefort; Erwann Le Péchoux; Julien Mertine	France

The Men's team foil event of the 2017 World Fencing Championships was held on 26 July 2017.

== Draw ==
=== Championship bracket ===
Round of 32
Australia	45
Belarus	34
Germany	45
Singapore	33
Chile	45
Brazil	37
China	45
India	15
Mexico	44
Ukraine	45
Great Britain	45
Sweden	27
Netherlands	21
Italy	45
United States	45
Guatemala	12
Canada	26
Poland	45
Hong Kong	40
Denmark	45
Uzbekistan	22
South Korea	45
Japan	45
Thailand	21
Belgium	19
Egypt	45
Hungary	45
Turkey	34

Round of 16
France	45
Australia	29
Germany	45
Chile	13
China	45
Ukraine	34
Great Britain	37
Italy	45
United States	45
Poland	24
Denmark	28
South Korea	45
Japan	45
Egypt	25
Hungary	29
Russia	45

Quarterfinals
France	45
Germany	31
China	27
Italy	45
United States	45
South Korea	34
Japan	32
Russia	45

Semifinals
France	35
Italy	45
United States	45
Russia	29

Final
Italy	45
United States	41
Third place
France	45
Russia	37

=== 5–8th place bracket ===
5–8th place semifinals
Germany	45
China	29
South Korea	45
Japan	37

Fifth place
Germany	42
South Korea	43
Seventh place
China	43
Japan	45

=== 9–16th place bracket ===
9–16th place quarterfinals
Australia	45
Chile	23
Ukraine	45
Great Britain	28
Denmark	33
Poland	45
Egypt	42
Hungary	45

9–12th place semifinals
Australia	32
Ukraine	45
Poland	45
Hungary	37

Ninth place
Ukraine	45
Poland	36
Eleventh place
Australia	27
Hungary	45

=== 13–16th place bracket ===
13–16th place semifinals
Chile	20
Great Britain	45
Denmark	38
Egypt	45

13th place
Great Britain	45
Egypt	35
15th place
Chile	30
Denmark	45

== Final ranking ==
Rank	Team
Gold medal	Italy
Silver medal	United States
Bronze medal	France
4	Russia
5	South Korea
6	Germany
7	Japan
8	China
9	Ukraine
10	Poland
11	Hungary
12	Australia
13	Great Britain
14	Egypt
15	Denmark
16	Chile
17	Brazil
18	Hong Kong
19	Belarus
20	Turkey
21	Canada
22	Sweden
23	Mexico
24	Belgium
25	Singapore
26	Thailand
27	Uzbekistan
28	India
29	Netherlands
30	Guatemala
