= Fencing at the 2019 Pan American Games – Men's foil =

Men's foil at the 2019 Pan American Games
- Venue: Lima Convention Centre
- Dates: August 6
- Competitors: 18 from 10 nations

Medalists
Gold medal	Gerek Meinhardt	United States
Silver medal	Gustavo Alarcón	Chile
Bronze medal	Maximilien van Haaster	Canada
Bronze medal	Race Imboden	United States

The men's foil competition of the fencing events at the 2019 Pan American Games was held on August 6 at the Lima Convention Centre.

The foil competition consisted of a qualification round followed by a single-elimination bracket with a bronze medal match between the two semifinal losers. Fencing was done to 15 touches or to the completion of three three-minute rounds if neither fencer reached 15 touches by then. At the end of time, the higher-scoring fencer was the winner; a tie resulted in an additional one-minute sudden-death time period. This sudden-death period was further modified by the selection of a draw-winner beforehand; if neither fencer scored a touch during the minute, the predetermined draw-winner won the bout.

== Schedule ==
Date	Time	Round
August 6, 2019	10:0	Qualification pools
August 6, 2019	12:30	Round of 16
August 6, 2019	14:00	Quarterfinals
August 6, 2019	16:00	Semifinals
August 6, 2019	18:10	Final

== Results ==
The following are the results of the event.

=== Qualification ===
All 18 fencers were put into three groups of six athletes, were each fencer would have five individual matches. The top 14 athletes overall would qualify for next round.

Rank	Name	Nation	Victories	TG	TR	Dif.	Notes
1	Gerek Meinhardt	United States	5	25	9	+16	Q
2	Daniel Sconzo	Colombia	4	24	11	+13	Q
3	Race Imboden	United States	4	23	10	+13	Q
4	Maximilien van Haaster	Canada	4	23	10	+13	Q
5	Humberto Aguilera	Cuba	4	23	16	+7	Q
6	Eli Schenkel	Canada	4	21	15	+6	Q
7	Guilherme Toldo	Brazil	3	20	14	+6	Q
8	Heitor Shimbo	Brazil	3	15	13	+2	Q
9	Augusto Servello	Argentina	3	18	19	-1	Q
10	Gustavo Alarcón	Chile	2	19	20	-1	Q
11	Diego Cervantes	Mexico	2	18	21	-3	Q
12	Carlos Padua	Puerto Rico	2	17	21	-4	Q
13	Dimitri Clairet	Colombia	2	11	16	-5	Q
14	Sebastián Tirado	Puerto Rico	2	15	22	-7	Q
15	Nicolas Marino	Argentina	1	9	18	-9	
16	Federico Cánchez	Peru	0	11	25	-14	
17	Marcio Orihuela	Peru	0	10	25	-15	
18	Raul Arizaga	Mexico	0	7	24	-17	

=== Elimination round ===
Round of 16
9	Augusto Servello (ARG)	15
8	Heitor Shimbo (BRA)	7
5	Humberto Aguilera (CUB)	14
12	Carlos Padua (PUR)	15
13	Dimitri Clairet (COL)	11
4	Maximilien van Haaster (CAN)	15
3	Race Imboden (USA)	15
14	Sebastián Tirado (PUR)	11
11	Diego Cervantes (MEX)	6
6	Eli Schenkel (CAN)	15
7	Guilherme Toldo (BRA)	12
10	Gustavo Alarcón (CHI)	15

Quarterfinals
1	Gerek Meinhardt (USA)	15
9	Augusto Servello (ARG)	8
12	Carlos Padua (PUR)	11
4	Maximilien van Haaster (CAN)	15
3	Race Imboden (USA)	15
6	Eli Schenkel (CAN)	5
10	Gustavo Alarcón (CHI)	15
2	Daniel Sconzo (COL)	14

Semifinals
1	Gerek Meinhardt (USA)	15
4	Maximilien van Haaster (CAN)	7
3	Race Imboden (USA)	13
10	Gustavo Alarcón (CHI)	15

Final
1	Gerek Meinhardt (USA)	15
10	Gustavo Alarcón (CHI)	11
