= Chen Haiwei =

Chinese foil fencer (born 1994)

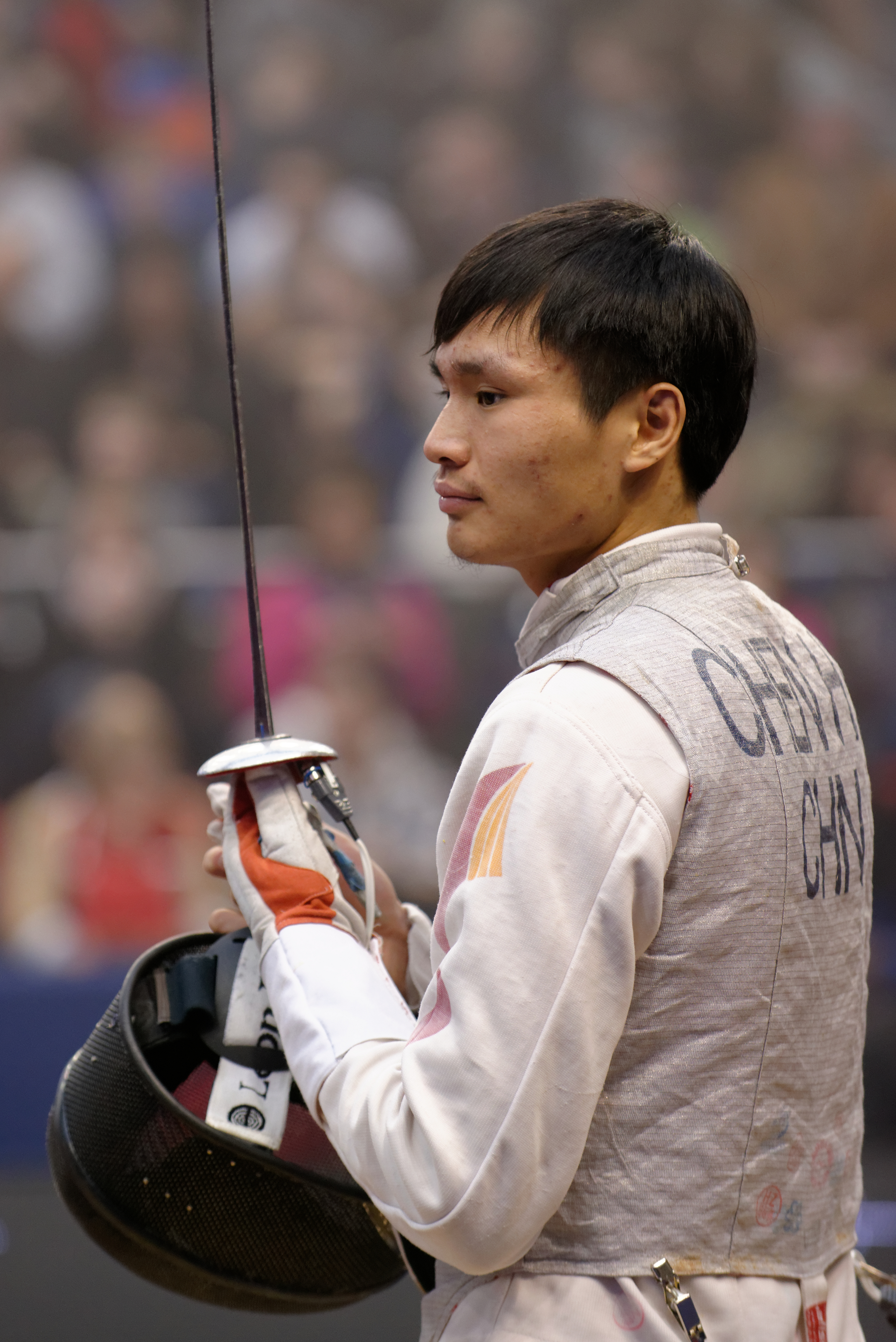
- Chen at the 2014 Challenge International de Paris

Personal information
- Nationality: Chinese
- Born: 30 December 1994 (age 31) Quanzhou, Fujian, China
- Height: 1.88 m (6 ft 2 in)
- Weight: 78 kg (172 lb)

Fencing career
- Sport: Fencing
- Weapon: Foil
- Hand: left-handed
- FIE ranking: current ranking
Medal record
Men's foil
Representing China
World Championships
Silver medal – second place	2014 Kazan	Team
Silver medal – second place	2023 Milan	Team
Bronze medal – third place	2015 Moscow	Team
Asian Games
Silver medal – second place	2014 Incheon	Team
Silver medal – second place	2022 Hangzhou	Individual
Silver medal – second place	2022 Hangzhou	Team
Bronze medal – third place	2014 Incheon	Individual
Asian Championships
Gold medal – first place	2014 Suwon	Team
Gold medal – first place	2024 Kuwait City	Team
Silver medal – second place	2014 Suwon	Individual
Bronze medal – third place	2013 Shanghai	Team

Chen Haiwei (Chinese: 陈海威; born 30 December 1994) is a Chinese competitive foil fencer. He has won three medals (one gold, one silver, one bronze) at the Asian Fencing Championships, two medals (one silver, one bronze) at the Asian Games, and two medals (one silver, one bronze) at the World Fencing Championships.

== Career ==
A restless child, Chen enjoyed many different sports. He took up fencing at age 13 after his parents had him try different options for the summer holidays. He created a surprise in the 2014 Junior World Championships at Plovdiv by defeating Alexander Massialas of the United States, in the semi-final, then Alexander Choupenitch of the Czech Republic. The same year Chen won the silver medal at the 2014 Asian Fencing Championships in Suwon. In the World Championships at Kazan he was defeated in the second round by Aleksey Cheremisinov, who eventually won the gold medal. In the team event, No.5 seed China defeated Egypt, the United States and Italy to meet France in the final. They were overcome 25–45 and came away with the silver medal.
