= Julien Mertine =

French fencer

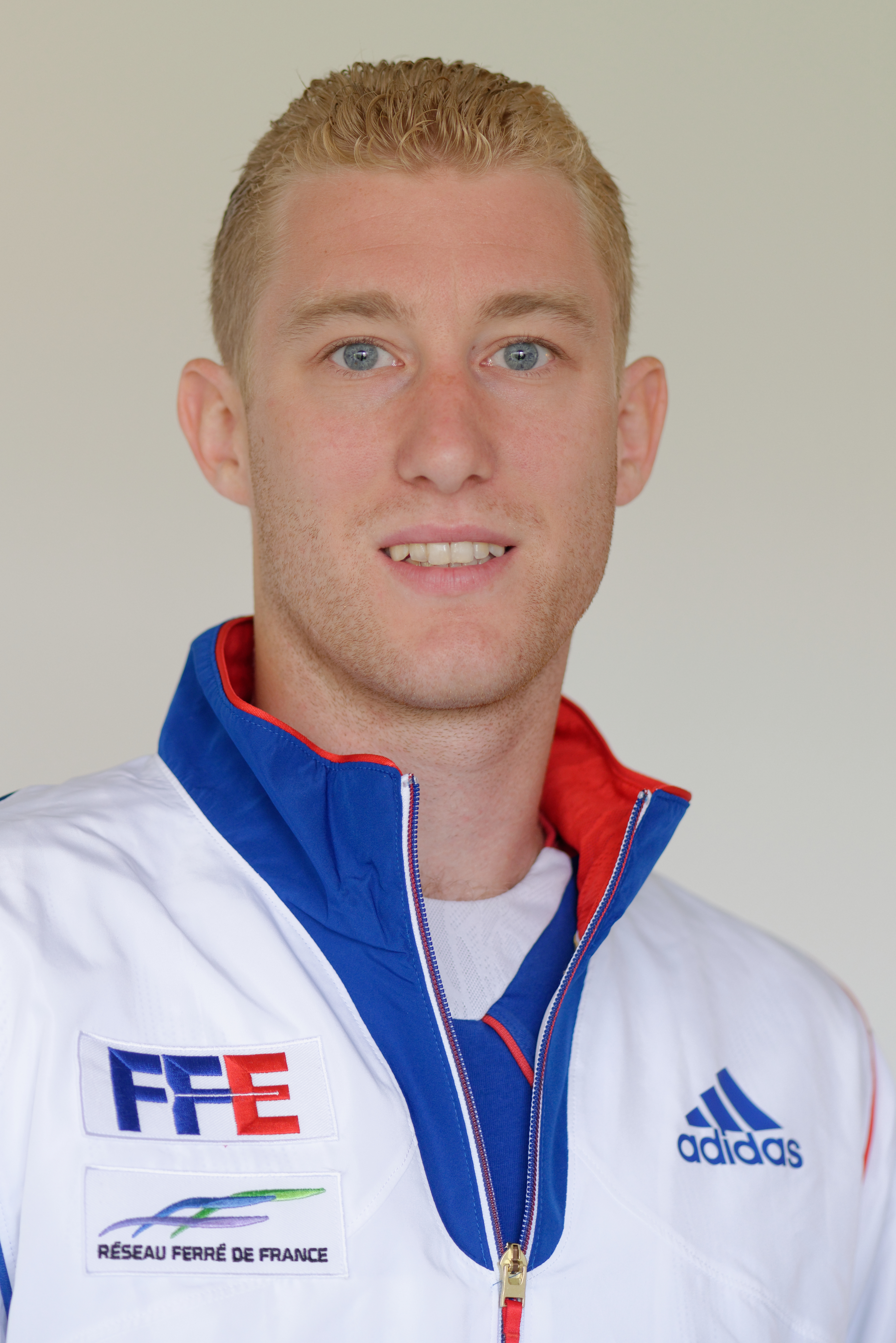
- Mertine in 2013

Personal information
- Born: 25 June 1988 (age 38) Saint-Germain-en-Laye, France
- Height: 1.85 m (6 ft 1 in)
- Weight: 80 kg (176 lb)

Fencing career
- Sport: Fencing
- Country: France
- Weapon: Foil
- Hand: right-handed
- National coach: Franck Boidin
- Club: CE Rueil-Malmaison / PF INSEP
- FIE ranking: current ranking
Medal record
Men's foil
Representing France
Olympic Games
Gold medal – first place	2020 Tokyo	Team
Bronze medal – third place	2024 Paris	Team
World Championships
Gold medal – first place	2014 Kazan	Team foil
Silver medal – second place	2019 Budapest	Team foil
Bronze medal – third place	2017 Leipzig	Team foil
European Championships
Gold medal – first place	2014 Strasbourg	Team Foil
Gold medal – first place	2015 Montreux	Team Foil
Gold medal – first place	2017 Tbilisi	Team Foil
Gold medal – first place	2019 Düsseldorf	Team foil
Gold medal – first place	2024 Basel	Team foil

Julien Mertine (born 26 June 1988) is a French right-handed foil fencer, four-time team European champion, 2014 team world champion, and 2021 team Olympic champion.

== Career ==
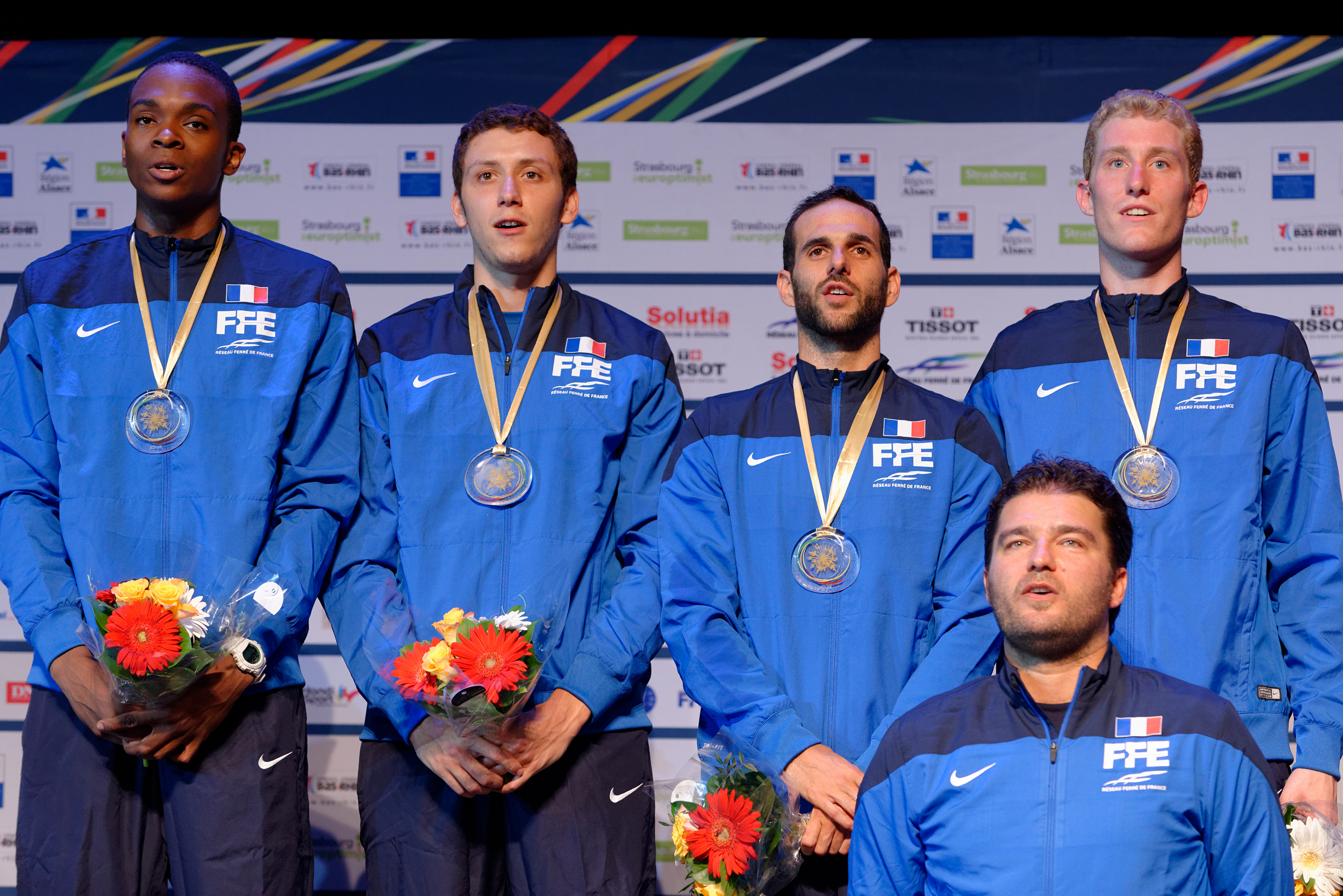
Mertine (R) on the podium at the 2014 European Championships

Mertine took up fencing at the age of five with his father, a fencing master who trained amongst others World champion Victor Sintès. When he was eighteen he joined the centre for promising young fencers at Châtenay-Malabry. He earned a team bronze medal at the 2007 Junior European Championships in Prag and at the 2008 Junior World Championships in Acireale. In 2009 he was admitted into INSEP, a state-sponsored institution for high-performance athletes.

Mertine climbed in 2010 his first World Cup podium with a bronze medal in Copenhague, and was selected into the France national team as a reserve. His first competition with the team was the 2011 Challenge International in Paris, in which France finished 5th. 117th in world rankings, Mertine won the Havana World Cup that same season after defeating Italy's Giorgio Avola in the final.

In the 2012–13 season, he earned a bronze medal in the Seoul World Cup and in the Tokyo Grand Prix, but ceded to Belarus' Siarhei Byk in the first round of the European Championships in Zagreb. In the team event, France was overcome by Great Britain in the first round. At the World Championships in Budapest Mertine defeated Great Britain's Richard Kruse in the first round, but was then beaten by Heo Jun of South Korea. He was replaced in the team event by Enzo Lefort. He finished the season No.19, his best ranking as of 2014.

In the 2013–14 season Mertine won the national French championships after defeating successively Enzo Lefort and Erwann Le Péchoux. At the European Championships in Strasbourg he lost 14–15 in the table of 16 to Alexander Choupenitch of the Czech Republic. In the team event France defeated the Czech Republic and Italy before prevailing over Italy, allowing Mertine to win his first gold medal in a major event. At the World Championships in Kazan he was defeated 13–15 in the preliminary table of 64 by Israel's Tomer Or after leading 13–7. In the team event France defeated Russia in the semi-finals and proceeded to crush China to earn the world title.

Mertine passed his fencing master certificate when he was nineteen. He now teaches fencing at his own club in Rueil-Malmaison and at CE Orgeval-Villennes.

== Medal record ==
=== Olympic Games ===
Year	Location	Event	Position
2021	Tokyo, Japan	Team Men's Foil	1st

=== World Championship ===
Year	Location	Event	Position
2014	Kazan, Russia	Team Men's Foil	1st
2017	Leipzig, Germany	Team Men's Foil	3rd
2019	Budapest, Hungary	Team Men's Foil	2nd

=== European Championship ===
Year	Location	Event	Position
2014	Strasbourg, France	Team Men's Foil	1st
2015	Montreux, Switzerland	Team Men's Foil	1st
2017	(Georgia (country)) Tbilisi, Georgia	Team Men's Foil	1st
2019	Düsseldorf, Germany	Team Men's Foil	1st

=== Grand Prix ===
Date	Location	Event	Position
05/04/2013	Tokyo, Japan	Individual Men's Foil	3rd
03/15/2019	(United States) Anaheim, California	Individual Men's Foil	1st

=== World Cup ===
Date	Location	Event	Position
01/16/2010	Copenhagen, Denmark	Individual Men's Foil	3rd
06/29/2012	Havana, Cuba	Individual Men's Foil	1st
04/26/2013	Seoul, South Korea	Individual Men's Foil	3rd
01/19/2018	Paris, France	Individual Men's Foil	3rd
11/08/2019	Bonn, Germany	Individual Men's Foil	1st
