= Artur Akhmatkhuzin =

Russian foil fencer (born 1988)

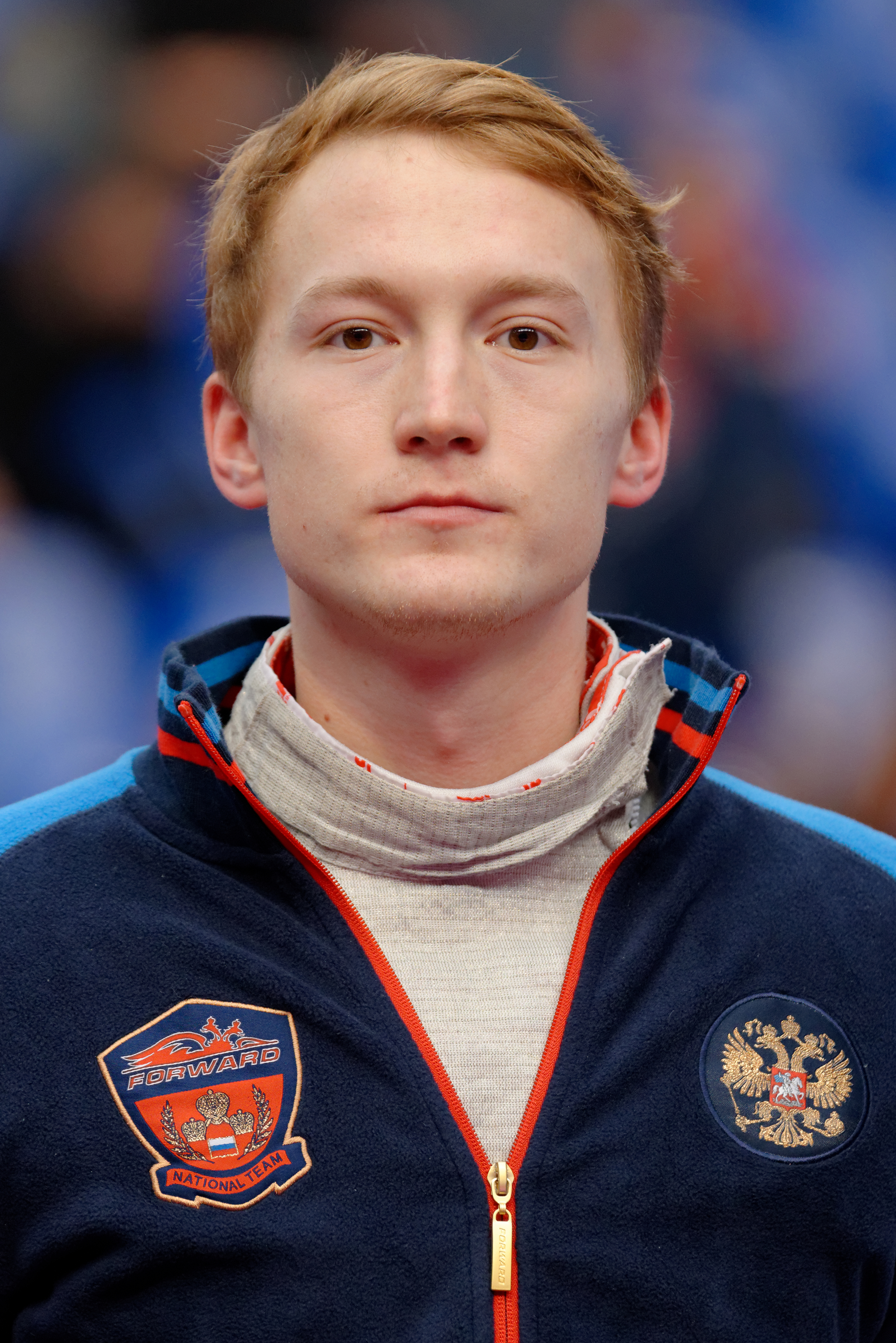
- Akhmatkhuzin at the 2015 Paris World Cup

Personal information
- Full name: Artur Kamilevich Akhmatkhuzin
- Born: 21 May 1988 (age 38) Novyy Aktanyshbash, Krasnokamsky District, Bashkortostan, Russian SFSR, USSR
- Height: 1.87 m (6 ft 2 in)
- Weight: 76 kg (168 lb)

Fencing career
- Sport: Fencing
- Country: Russia
- Weapon: Foil
- Hand: Right-handed
- National coach: Stefano Cerioni
- Club: UFA
- Head coach: Ilgar Mammadov, Ramil Ayupov
- FIE ranking: current ranking
Medal record
Men's fencing
Representing Russia
Olympic Games
Gold medal – first place	2016 Rio de Janeiro	Team foil
World Championships
Silver medal – second place	2013 Budapest	Individual foil
Silver medal – second place	2015 Moscow	Team foil
Bronze medal – third place	2015 Moscow	Individual foil
European Championships
Gold medal – first place	2016 Toruń	Team foil
Silver medal – second place	2015 Montreux	Team foil

Artur Kamilevich Akhmatkhuzin (Russian: Артур Камилевич Ахматхузин; born 21 May 1988) is a Russian foil fencer, silver medallist at the 2013 World Fencing Championships.

== Career ==
Akhmatkhuzin, who is of Tatar descent, made his debut in international competition at the 2005 Cadet World Championships in Linz, where he earned a bronze medal. That same year, he joined the cadet and junior national team, in which he won a team gold medal in the 2005 Junior European Championships at Tapolca, a team silver medal in the 2007 Junior European Championship in Prague, and a team bronze medal in the 2007 World European Championships in Belek.

In the seniors, Akhmatkhuzin placed second in the 2012 Venice Grand Prix, his first podium in the Fencing World Cup. He took part in the 2012 Summer Olympics, but was defeated in the last 16 by China's Ma Jianfei. In 2013 he won the A Coruña World Cup and earned a bronze medal in the Prince Takamado World Cup. Ranked 6th before the 2013 World Fencing Championships in Budapest, he defeated Olympic silver medallist Alaaeldin Abouelkassem in the last 16, then Olympic champion Lei Sheng and Ukraine's Rostyslav Hertsyk to reach the final against Miles Chamley-Watson of the United States. Distanced early in the bout, he was defeated 6–15 and ended up with a silver medal. He finished the season No.3 in world rankings. A few weeks later, Akhmatkhuzin took part in the 2013 World Combat Games. He was defeated by Great Britain's Richard Kruse in the semi-finals and met Chamley-Watson for the third place. This time he defeated the American 15–12 to take the bronze medal.

In the 2013–14 season, Akhmatkhuzin reached the quarter-finals in the Paris World Cup. He was defeated by Enzo Lefort, who eventually won the gold medal. An injury sustained during the competition prevented him from taking part to the team event. He later underwent surgery and was rested for the entire season.

Akhmatkhuzin came back to international competition in early 2015 at the Paris World Cup. He made it through the qualification stage, but was defeated in the first elimination round by Italy's Daniele Garozzo, who eventually won the silver medal. At the next World Cup competition, the Löwe von Bonn, he was stopped in the last 16 by Japan's Yuki Ota.

At the 2016 Summer Olympics, in the men's individual foil, he beat Miles Chamley-Watson in the last 32, before losing to eventual silver medalist American Alexander Massialas in the last 16. In the team event, Russia won the gold medal, with Akhmatkhuzin fencing in each round.
