= Men's team foil at the 2015 World Fencing Championships =

The Men's team foil event of the 2015 World Fencing Championships was held on 18–19 July 2015.

== Medalists ==
Gold	Italy; Giorgio Avola; Andrea Baldini; Andrea Cassarà; Daniele Garozzo
Silver	Russia; Artur Akhmatkhuzin; Aleksey Cheremisinov; Renal Ganeyev; Dmitry Rigin
Bronze	China; Chen Haiwei; Lei Sheng; Ma Jianfei; Li Chen

== Draw ==
=== Finals ===
Final
Italy	45
Russia	38

Third place
France	31
China	45

=== Top half ===
Round of 32
Austria	44
Belarus	45
Egypt	45
Kazakhstan	44
Colombia	20
Japan	45
Algeria	38
Brazil	45
Ukraine	45
Hungary	25

Round of 16
France	45
Belarus	33
Egypt	21
Japan	42
United States	45
Brazil	27
Ukraine	27
Italy	45

Quarterfinals
France	45
Japan	42
United States	37
Italy	45

Semifinals
France	25
Italy	45

=== Bottom half ===
Round of 32
Turkey	43
Hong Kong	45
Poland	45
Australia	25
Kuwait	26
South Korea	45
Germany	45
Indonesia	23
Venezuela	21
Great Britain	45
Canada	45
Mexico	26

Round of 16
China	45
Hong Kong	30
Poland	33
South Korea	45
Germany	28
Great Britain	29
Canada	32
Russia	45

Quarterfinals
China	43
South Korea	32
Great Britain	38
Russia	40

Semifinals
China	37
Russia	45

=== Placement rounds ===
==== 5–8th place ====
5–8th place semifinals
Japan	36
United States	45
South Korea	42
Great Britain	43

Fifth place
United States	42
Great Britain	45
Seventh place
Japan	0
South Korea	0

==== 9–16th place ====
9–16th place quarterfinals
Belarus	42
Egypt	45
Brazil	26
Ukraine	45
Hong Kong	40
Poland	45
Germany	45
Canada	38

9–12th place semifinals
Egypt	45
Ukraine	42
Poland	41
Germany	45

Ninth place
Egypt	45
Germany	44
Eleventh place
Ukraine	45
Poland	44

==== 13–16th place ====
13–16th place semifinals
Belarus	45
Brazil	38
Hong Kong	45
Canada	28

13th place
Belarus	35
Hong Kong	45
15th place
Brazil	45
Canada	44

== Final classification ==
Rank	Nation
1st place, gold medalist(s)	Italy
2nd place, silver medalist(s)	Russia
3rd place, bronze medalist(s)	China
4	France
5	Great Britain
6	United States
7	Japan
8	South Korea
9	Egypt
10	Germany
11	Ukraine
12	Poland
13	Hong Kong
14	Belarus
15	Brazil
16	Canada
17	Austria
18	Mexico
19	Turkey
20	Hungary
21	Algeria
22	Australia
23	Venezuela
24	Kazakhstan
25	Colombia
26	Indonesia
27	Kuwait
