= Jérémy Cadot =

French fencer (born 1986)

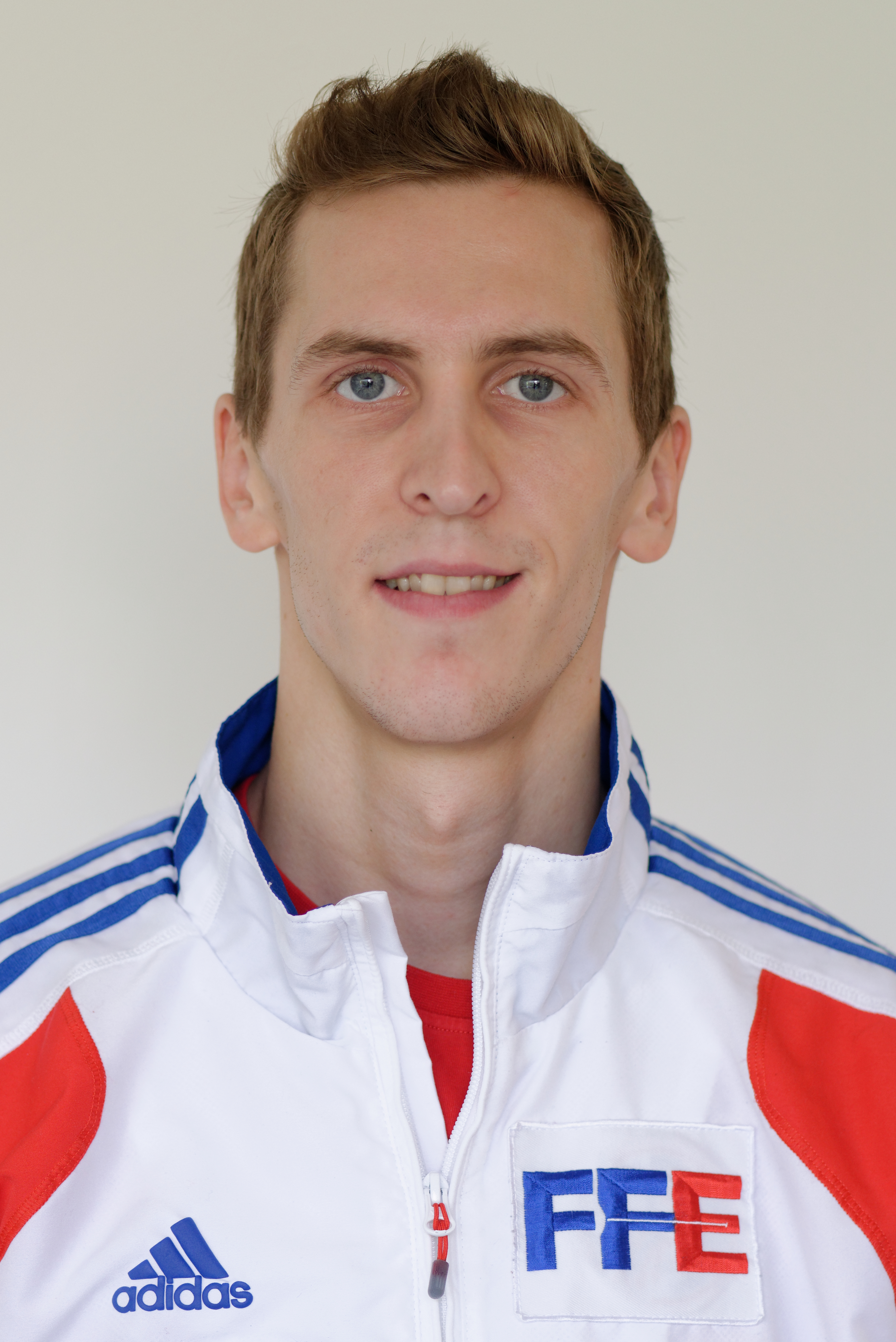

Personal information
- Nickname: le Snake
- Born: 7 November 1986 (age 40) Lens
- Height: 1.86 m (6 ft 1 in)
- Weight: 75 kg (165 lb)

Fencing career
- Sport: Fencing
- Weapon: foil
- Hand: left-handed
- National coach: Franck Boidin
- Club: CE Henin Beaumont / PF INSEP
- Head coach: Fabrice Vanhems
- FIE ranking: current ranking
Medal record
Olympic Games
Silver medal – second place	2016 Rio de Janeiro	Team foil
World Championships
Bronze medal – third place	2013 Budapest	Team foil
Bronze medal – third place	2017 Leipzig	Team foil
European Championships
Gold medal – first place	2015 Montreux	Team foil
Gold medal – first place	2017 Tbilisi	Team foil
Bronze medal – third place	2017 Tbilisi	Foil

Jérémy Cadot (French: [ʒeʁemi kado]; born 7 November 1986) is a French foil fencer, bronze medallist at the 2013 World Fencing Championships in Budapest and team European Champion in 2015.

== Biography ==
Cadot was born and raised in Lens, in northern France. He took an interest in fencing after watching it on television. He took up the sport at the age of seven at his local club under maestro Fabrice Vanhems. He won the U14 French national championship, ranked 9th at the 2003 World Cadet Championships in Trapani and took a double silver medal at the 2006 World Junior Championships in Taebaek City. He finished the 2005–06 season World No.7 in junior rankings.

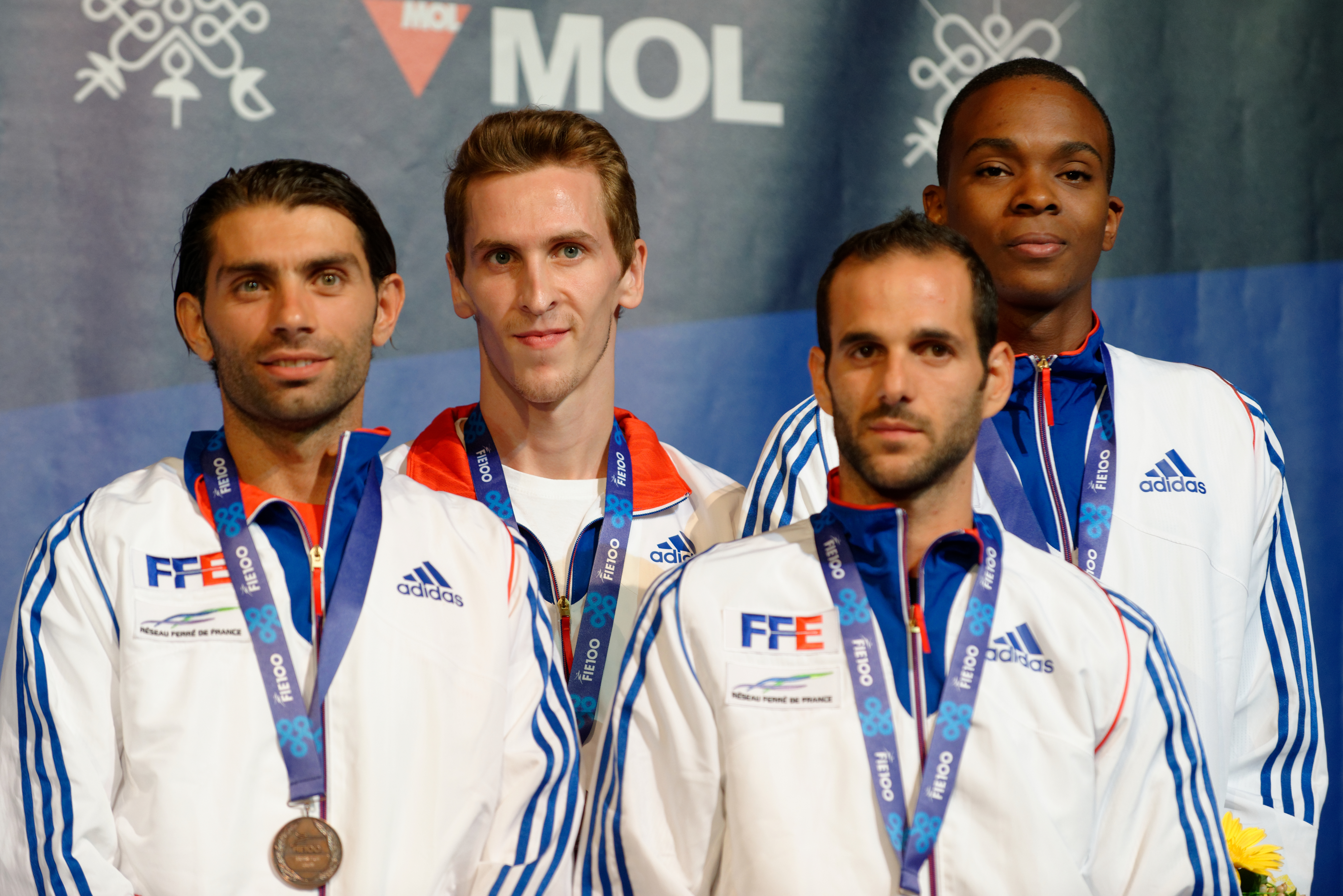
Cadot (2nd to left) with teammates on the podium of the 2013 World Fencing Championships

In the senior category, Cadot climbed his first World Cup podium with a silver medal in Copenhagen in January 2007, followed a few months later by a bronze on Isla Margarita. He was selected into the national senior team as a reserve for the 2007 European Championships in Ghent and for the following team competitions. He did not take part, however, in the 2008 Summer Olympics in Beijing. He left his formative club, affected by budgetary restrictions, to join the Team Lagardère in Paris, with which he won the team national championship. After a dry spell, he won a silver medal in the La Coruña World Cup in early 2010, but a case of mononucleosis forced him to forfeit. His hopes for the 2010 World Championships at home in Paris were crushed in the first round by Korea's Kwon Young-ho. He was replaced in the team by Julien Mertine and went through a new dry spell.

After the dissolution of Team Lagardère in 2012, Cadot went back to his formative club and resumed training under his childhood coach. He was selected into the national team again and in the beginning of the 2013–14 season he reached the final at the Paris World Cup. At the European Championships in Zagreb he reached the table of 16, where he was defeated by four-time World champion Peter Joppich after leading 14 to 11. At the World Championships in Budapest, he was stopped in the second round by Race Imboden of the United States. In the team event, France met the United States in the semi-finals. With a 32–26 lead, Cadot and Enzo Lefort crumbled against Gerek Meinhardt and Race Imboden. France was finally defeated 35–45. They however prevailed over Russia to win the bronze medal, Cadot's first World podium. He finished the season No.25 in world rankings, a career best as of 2014.

In the 2013–14 season his lack of results in World Cup competitions had him replaced in the national team. He did not take part in the European Championships in Strasbourg, nor in the World Championships in Kazan, where France won the gold medal in both events. He bounced back in the 2014–15 season by winning the San Francisco World Cup.
