= Dmitry Rigin =

Russian fencer (born 1985)

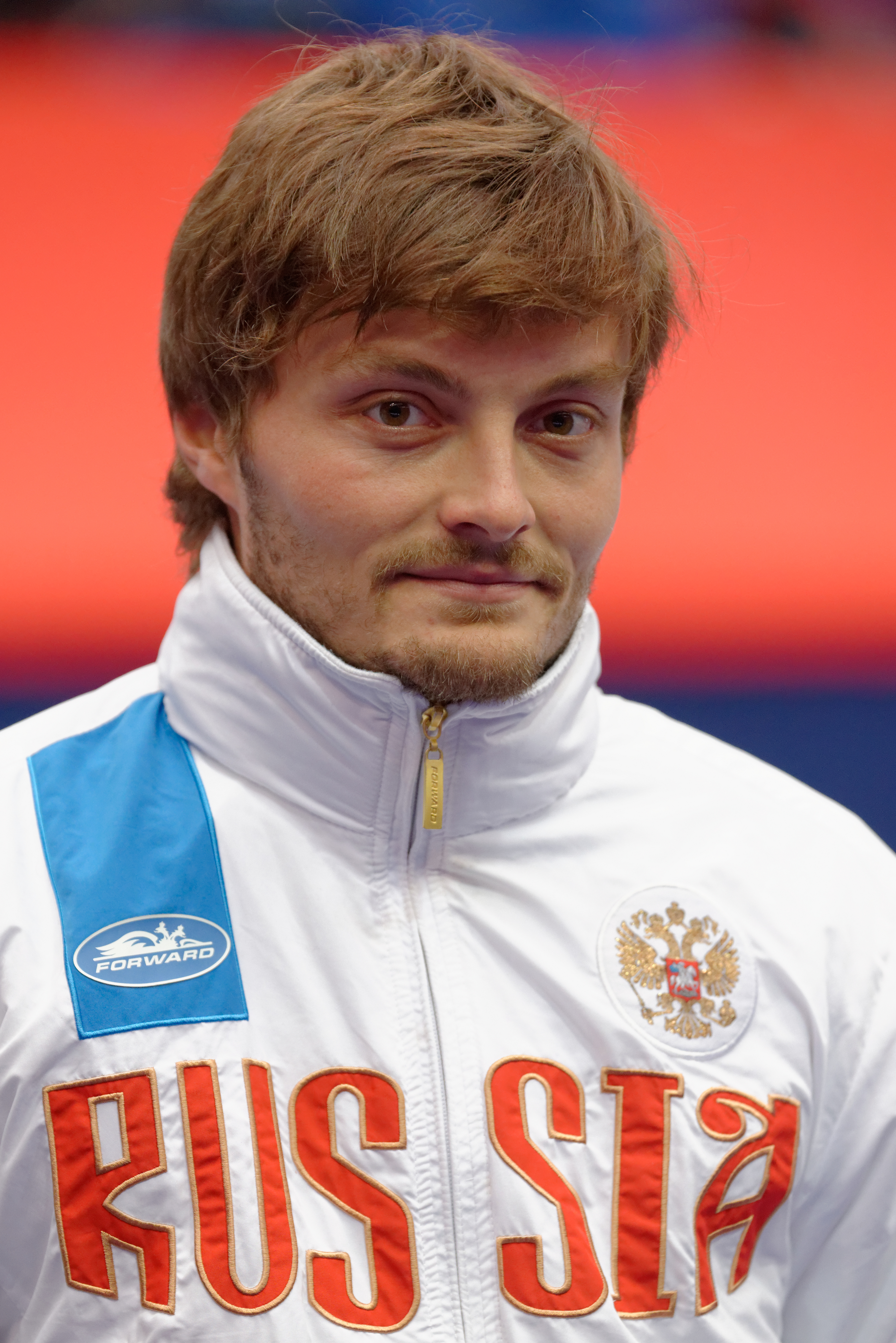

Personal information
- Full name: Dmitry Vasilyevich Rigin
- Nationality: Russian
- Born: 10 April 1985 (age 41) Krasnoyarsk, Siberia
- Home town: Saint-Petersburg
- Height: 1.8 m (5 ft 11 in)
- Weight: 75 kg (165 lb)

Fencing career
- Sport: Fencing
- Weapon: Foil
- Hand: Left-handed
- National coach: Stefano Cerioni
- Club: Spartak Saint Petersburg
- FIE ranking: current ranking
Medal record
World Championships
Silver medal – second place	2015 Moscow	Team foil
European Championships
Gold medal – first place	2016 Toruń	Team foil
Silver medal – second place	2015 Monteaux	Team foil
Bronze medal – third place	2011 Sheffield	Team foil
Bronze medal – third place	2014 Strasbourg	Team foil
Summer Universiade
Gold medal – first place	2007 Bangkok	Team foil
Gold medal – first place	2009 Belgrade	Team foil

Dmitry Vasilyevich Rigin (Russian: Дмитрий Васильевич Ригин; born 10 April 1985) is a Russian foil fencer, team bronze medal in the 2011 and 2014 European Fencing Championships.

== Career ==
He was called into the national team for the European Championships in Sheffield. Russia saw off Israel, but were stopped by France in the semifinal. They overcame Germany in the match for the bronze medal, bringing Rigin his first European distinction. At Catania 2011, his first World Championships, he was defeated in the second round by USA's Gerek Meinhardt. These results pushed him to a world No.17 ranking at the end of the season and he was named “breakthrough of the year” by the Russian Fencing Federation.

Rigin failed however to qualify to the 2012 Summer Olympics and the 2011–12 and 2012–13 seasons proved disappointing. He returned to form in the 2013–14 season, reaching the quarter-finals in the La Coruña and St Petersburg World Cups. He won his second World Cup event in Havana.

Rigin began the 2014–15 season by a silver medal at the Prince Takamodo World Cup in Tokyo, after a defeat in the final to USA's Race Imboden. In March 2015 he won the Havana Grand Prix after prevailing over USA's Alexander Massialas.
