= René Pranz =

Austrian fencer (born 1985)

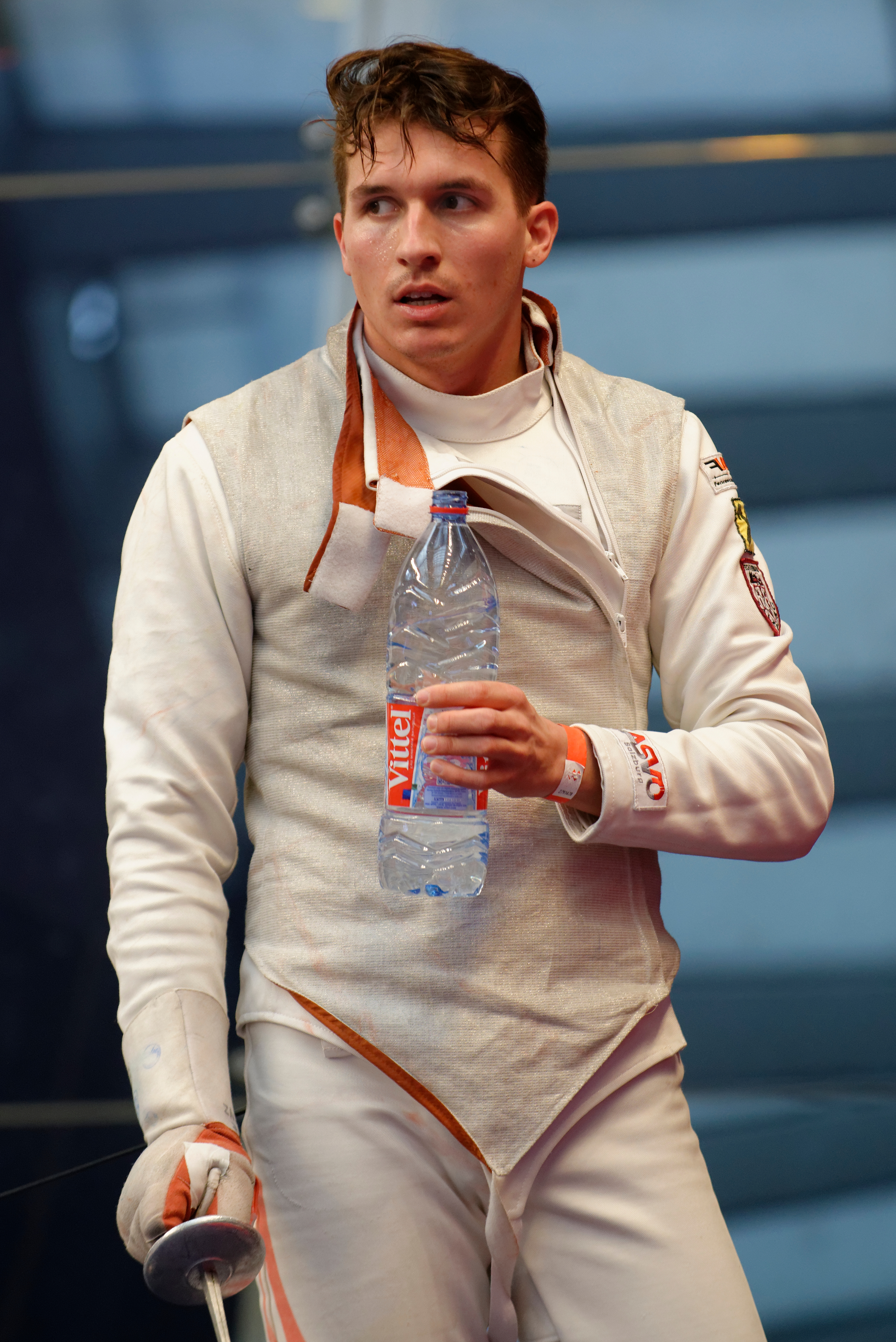
- Pranz in 2014

Personal information
- Nationality: Austrian
- Born: 4 August 1985 (age 41) Vienna, Austria
- Height: 1.84 m (6 ft 0 in)
- Weight: 78 kg (172 lb)

Fencing career
- Sport: Fencing
- Weapon: Foil
- Hand: Right-handed
- FIE ranking: current ranking

René Pranz (born 4 August 1985) is an Austrian fencer, specialising in the foil, who competed at the 2016 Summer Olympics, held in Rio de Janeiro, Brazil.

== Personal life ==
Pranz was born on 4 August 1985 in Vienna, Austria. He studied for a degree in economics and law at the University of Salzburg.

== Fencing ==
At the 2006 European Fencing Championships in İzmir, Turkey, Pranz was part of an Austrian squad that finished eighth in the team foil event. At the 2006 World Fencing Championships he placed 48th in the individual foil; in 2007 he was 64th, in 2009 he was 26th and in 2010 he finished 51st.

At the 2011 European Fencing Championships in Sheffield, United Kingdom, he placed seventh in the individual foil. The same year he finished 44th in the individual event at the World Championships. At the 2013 World Championships he finished 39th. He competed at the 2013 Summer Universiade games held in Kazan, Russia. In the individual foil he defeated Noriyuki Nagashima of Japan 15–13 in the round of 64 and then Italy's Tobia Biondo 15–13 in the last 32, before being eliminated in the round of 16 after an 11–15 defeat to Italian Daniele Garozzo. Pranz placed 28th in the individual foil at the 2014 World Fencing Championships and was 55th at the 2015 championships.

He competed at the 2015 European Games held in Baku, Azerbaijan. Competing in Pool B of the men's foil he won all five of his pool matches to advance to the round of 16 where he was eliminated after losing 8–15 to Dmitry Zherebchenko of Russia.

In April 2016 Pranz defeated Turkish fencer Martino Minuto in the final of the European Olympic zonal qualification tournament held in Prague, Czech Republic. This result qualified him as part of the Austrian team for the 2016 Summer Olympics held in Rio de Janeiro, Brazil, where he competed in the men's individual foil event. Pranz is the only Austrian fencer to have qualified for Rio. He was eliminated by Brazilian fencer Guilherme Toldo in the round of 64.
