= Erwann Le Péchoux =

French fencer (born 1982)

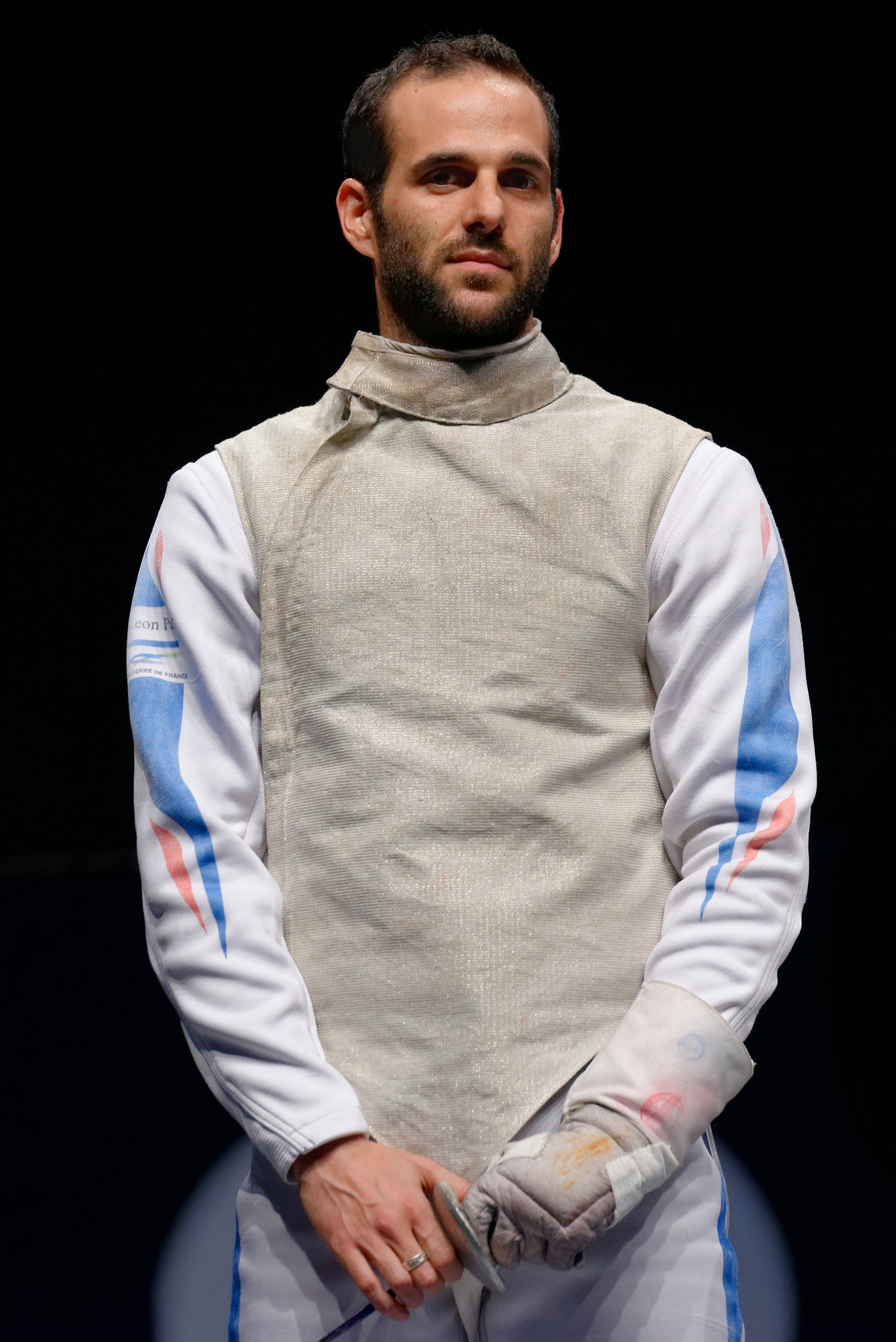
- Le Péchoux at the 2014 Master de fleuret

Personal information
- Nickname: Petit Homme
- Born: 13 January 1982 (age 44) Pertuis, Vaucluse, France
- Height: 1.71 m (5 ft 7 in)
- Weight: 62 kg (137 lb)

Fencing career
- Sport: Fencing
- Country: France
- Weapon: Foil
- Hand: left-handed
- National coach: Franck Boidin
- FIE ranking: current ranking
Medal record
Olympic Games
Gold medal – first place	2020 Tokyo	Team
Silver medal – second place	2016 Rio de Janeiro	Team
World Championships
Gold medal – first place	2005 Leipzig	Team
Gold medal – first place	2006 Turin	Team
Gold medal – first place	2007 St Petersburg	Team
Gold medal – first place	2014 Kazan	Team
Silver medal – second place	2011 Catania	Team
Silver medal – second place	2019 Budapest	Team
Bronze medal – third place	2013 Budapest	Team
Bronze medal – third place	2017 Leipzig	Team
European Championships
Gold medal – first place	2003 Brouges	Team
Gold medal – first place	2014 Strasbourg	Team
Gold medal – first place	2015 Montreux	Team
Gold medal – first place	2017 Tbilisi	Team
Gold medal – first place	2019 Düsseldorf	Team
Silver medal – second place	2011 Sheffield	Team
Silver medal – second place	2012 Legnano	Team
Silver medal – second place	2016 Torún	Individual
Bronze medal – third place	2007 Ghent	Individual
Bronze medal – third place	2014 Strasbourg	Individual

Erwann Lucien Édouard Le Péchoux (born 13 January 1982) is a French left-handed foil fencer. Le Péchoux is a five-time team European champion and four-time team world champion. A five-time Olympian, Le Péchoux is a 2016 team Olympic silver medalist and 2021 team Olympic champion. Le Péchoux competed in the 2004 Athens Olympic Games, the 2008 Beijing Olympic Games, and 2012 London Olympic Games, the 2016 Rio de Janeiro Olympic Games, and the 2021 Tokyo Olympic Games.

== Biography ==
Erwann Le Péchoux has three younger brothers, the eldest of whom, Hugo, is also a fencer and competes for the Cercle d'Escrime de Meyreuil in the Bouches-du-Rhône department.

He is married to Tunisian foil fencer Inès Boubakri, the bronze medallist in the women's individual foil at the 2016 Summer Olympics in Rio de Janeiro and Tunisia's flag bearer at the opening ceremony of the 2020 Summer Olympics in Tokyo. His mother-in-law is Henda Zaouali, a former Tunisian international fencer who represented Tunisia at the 1996 Summer Olympics in Atlanta, competing in both the individual foil and individual épée events. As Tunisian law prohibited Muslim women from marrying non-Muslim men until September 2017, Le Péchoux converted to Islam in order to marry Boubakri.

A left-handed fencer, he is nicknamed "Petit Homme" ("Little Man").

== Career ==
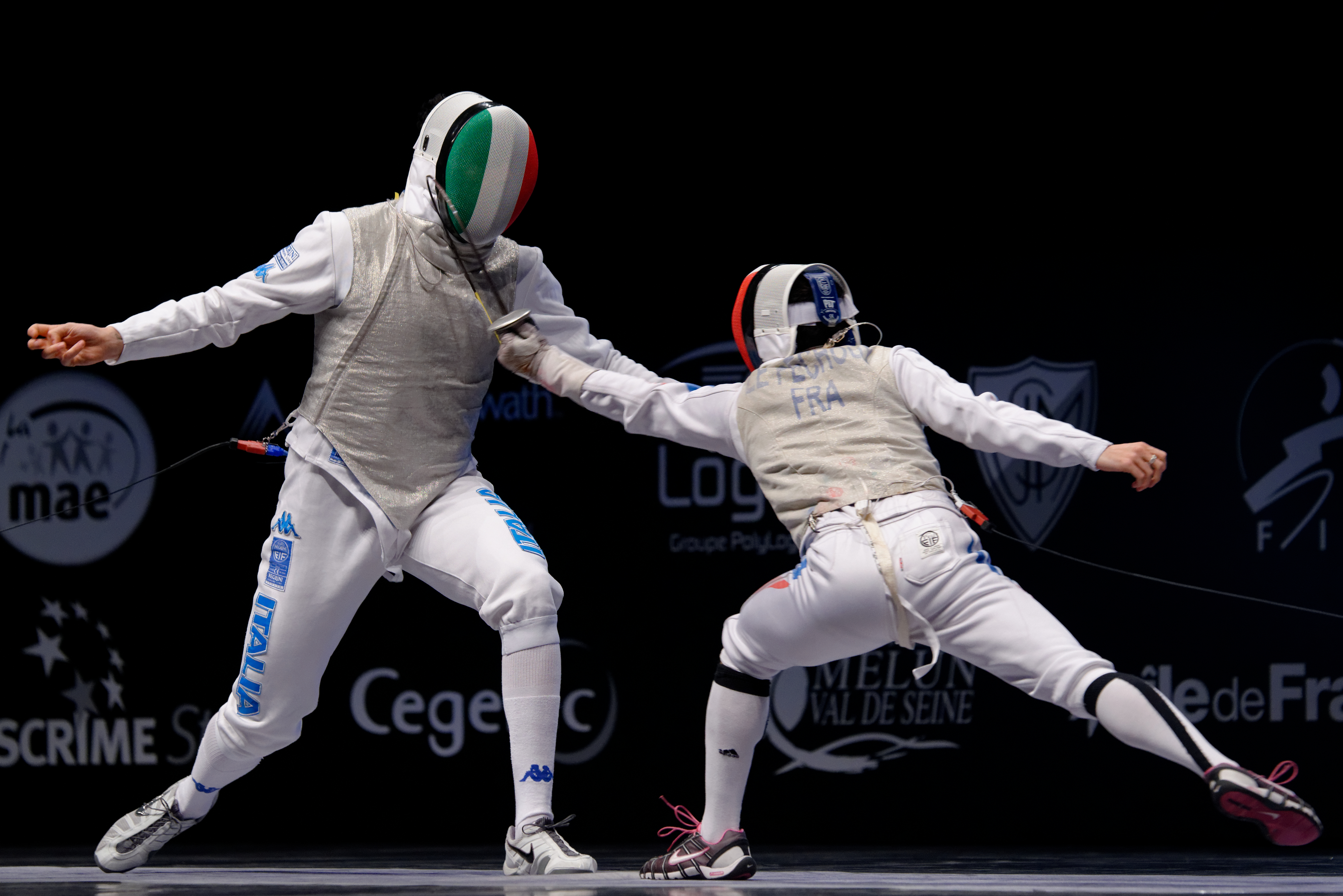
Erwann Le Péchoux and Andrea Cassarà (left) in 2014

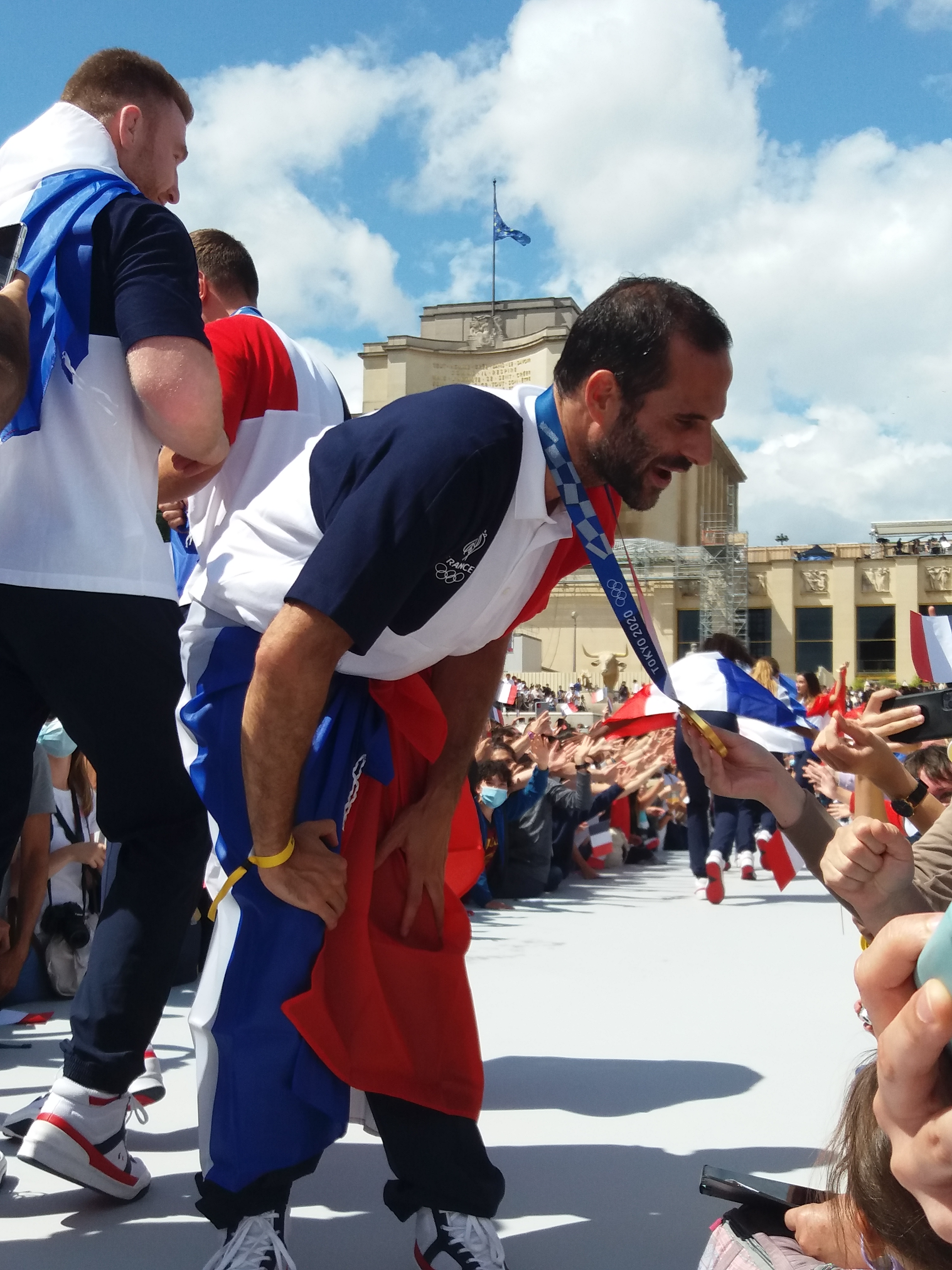
Le Péchoux celebrating France's Olympic gold medal with supporters at the Trocadéro in Paris on 8 August 2021.

Le Péchoux took up fencing at the age of seven at the club in Gardanne. He later joined Escrime Pays d'Aix in Aix-en-Provence and was selected for the French senior national foil team in 2000, where he trained under masters Clos and Boidin. After winning the silver medal at the 2002 World Junior Championships, he emerged as one of France's leading foil fencers in 2003. That year he won the individual title at the French Championships and helped France capture the team gold medal at the European Championships in Bourges, alongside Jean-Noël Ferrari, Antoine Mercier and Terence Joubert.

He represented France at the 2004 Summer Olympics in Athens, finishing fifth in the team foil event with Loïc Attely, Jean-Noël Ferrari and Brice Guyart, and thirteenth in the individual foil after being eliminated in the round of 16 by Italy's Simone Vanni.

In 2005 he won the overall Fencing World Cup title and claimed his first World team championship at the World Championships in Leipzig, together with Nicolas Beaudan, Brice Guyart and Victor Sintès, beginning a period of sustained success for the French team. Together with Loïc Attely, Nicolas Beaudan and Marcel Marcilloux, he successfully defended the world title at the 2006 World Championships in Turin, while also winning his second French individual championship.

In 2007 he secured a third consecutive World team title at the World Championships in Saint Petersburg with Nicolas Beaudan, Brice Guyart and Marcel Marcilloux. During the same season he also won individual bronze medals at both the European Championships and the French Championships.

He won his third French individual title in 2008. At the 2008 Summer Olympics in Beijing he competed only in the individual foil event, as the men's team foil competition was not included in the Olympic programme. He reached the quarter-finals before narrowly losing 10–9 to Italy's Salvatore Sanzo.

In 2009 he earned the bronze medal at the French Championships. The following year he completed a domestic double, winning both the individual and team titles with Escrime Pays d'Aix.

He repeated the feat in 2011, when he also won team silver medals at the World Championships in Catania and the European Championships in Sheffield.

At the 2012 European Championships in Legnano he won a second consecutive European team silver medal. Competing at his third Olympic Games, in London, he finished ninth in the individual foil after losing to South Korea's Choi Byung-chul in the round of 16, and eighth in the team foil event alongside Victor Sintès, Marcel Marcilloux and Enzo Lefort. The following year he won the team bronze medal at the World Championships in Budapest.

In 2014 he captured his fourth World team title at the World Championships in Kazan with Enzo Lefort, Julien Mertine and Vincent Simon, helping France regain the title after a seven-year interval. The same quartet also won the team gold medal at the European Championships in Strasbourg, where Le Péchoux added an individual bronze medal. In 2015 he retained the European team title alongside Jérémy Cadot, Enzo Lefort and Julien Mertine.

At the 2016 European Championships in Toruń he won the silver medal in the individual event, losing the final to Russia's Timur Safin. He represented France at the 2016 Summer Olympics in Rio de Janeiro, where he won the silver medal in the team foil event with Jérémy Cadot, Enzo Lefort and Jean-Paul Tony Helissey. In the individual competition he was eliminated in the round of 16 by American Gerek Meinhardt, placing fourteenth overall.

At the 2017 European Championships in Tbilisi he won another team title with Jérémy Cadot, Julien Mertine and Enzo Lefort. Later that year, at the World Championships in Leipzig, he was defeated in the opening round of the individual competition by Japan's Kyosuke Matsuyama before helping France secure the bronze medal in the team event.

In 2019 he claimed his fourth European team title at the European Championships in Düsseldorf and added a team silver medal at the World Championships in Budapest.

At the 2020 Summer Olympics, postponed to 2021 because of the COVID-19 pandemic, Le Péchoux won the gold medal in the men's team foil event with Enzo Lefort, Julien Mertine and Maxime Pauty. France defeated the ROC team 45–28 in the final, making him an Olympic champion at his fifth and final Olympic appearance.

=== Coaching career ===
After retiring from competition following the Tokyo Olympics, Le Péchoux was appointed coach of the Japanese men's national foil team in 2021, joining the coaching staff headed by fellow Frenchman Franck Boidin. Under his guidance, Japan won the team title at the 2023 World Championships in Milan, the nation's first world championship in the men's team foil event.

At the 2024 Summer Olympics in Paris, he coached Japan to its first-ever Olympic title in the men's team foil event, defeating Italy 45–36 in the final.

== Medal record ==
=== Olympic Games ===
Year	Location	Event	Position
2016	Rio de Janeiro, Brazil	Team men's foil	2nd
2021	Tokyo, Japan	Team men's foil	1st

=== World Championship ===
Year	Location	Event	Position
2005	Leipzig, Germany	Team men's foil	1st
2006	Turin, Italy	Team men's foil	1st
2007	St. Petersburg, Russia	Team men's foil	1st
2011	Catania, Italy	Team men's foil	2nd
2013	Budapest, Hungary	Team men's foil	3rd
2014	Kazan, Russia	Team men's foil	1st
2017	Leipzig, Germany	Team men's foil	3rd
2019	Budapest, Hungary	Team men's foil	2nd

=== European Championship ===
Year	Location	Event	Position
2003	Brouges, France	Team men's foil	1st
2007	Ghent, Belgium	Individual men's foil	3rd
2011	Sheffield, United Kingdom	Team men's foil	2nd
2012	Legnano, Italy	Team men's foil	2nd
2014	Strasbourg, France	Individual men's foil	3rd
2014	Strasbourg, France	Team men's foil	1st
2015	Montreux, Switzerland	Team men's foil	1st
2016	Toruń, Poland	Individual men's foil	2nd
2017	(Georgia (country)) Tbilisi, Georgia	Team men's foil	1st
2019	Düsseldorf, Germany	Team men's foil	1st

=== Grand Prix ===
Date	Location	Event	Position
16 May 2003	Espinho, Portugal	Individual men's foil	1st
21 January 2005	Paris, France	Individual men's foil	2nd
18 March 2005	Cairo, Egypt	Individual men's foil	2nd
24 June 2005	Havana, Cuba	Individual men's foil	1st
25 May 2007	Cairo, Egypt	Individual men's foil	1st
10 June 2007	Havana, Cuba	Individual men's foil	3rd
25 January 2008	Paris, France	Individual men's foil	3rd
2 May 2008	Shanghai, China	Individual men's foil	2nd
1 May 2009	Shanghai, China	Individual men's foil	1st
9 May 2011	Shanghai, China	Individual men's foil	1st
3 March 2012	Venice, Italy	Individual men's foil	1st
15 May 2015	Shanghai, China	Individual men's foil	3rd
19 May 2017	Shanghai, China	Individual men's foil	3rd

=== World Cup ===
Date	Location	Event	Position
25 March 2005	St. Petersburg, Russia	Individual men's foil	1st
2 October 2006	St. Petersburg, Russia	Individual men's foil	3rd
13 January 2007	Copenhagen, Denmark	Individual men's foil	1st
23 March 2007	Venice, Italy	Individual men's foil	1st
15 June 2007	Margarita Island, Venezuela	Individual men's foil	1st
5 January 2008	Copenhagen, Denmark	Individual men's foil	3rd
1 March 2008	Bonn, Germany	Individual men's foil	1st
29 May 2008	Montreal, Canada	Individual men's foil	1st
31 January 2009	A Coruña, Spain	Individual men's foil	2nd
6 February 2010	A Coruña, Spain	Individual men's foil	3rd
28 January 2011	Paris, France	Individual men's foil	1st
17 February 2012	A Coruña, Spain	Individual men's foil	2nd
26 April 2013	Seoul, South Korea	Individual men's foil	2nd
5 February 2016	Bonn, Germany	Individual men's foil	3rd
11 November 2016	Tokyo, Japan	Individual men's foil	3rd
11 October 2017	Tokyo, Japan	Individual men's foil	1st
1 March 2019	Copenhagen, Denmark	Individual men's foil	2nd
3 March 2019	St. Petersburg, Russia	Individual men's foil	3rd
