= Rostyslav Hertsyk =

Ukrainian fencer (born 1989)

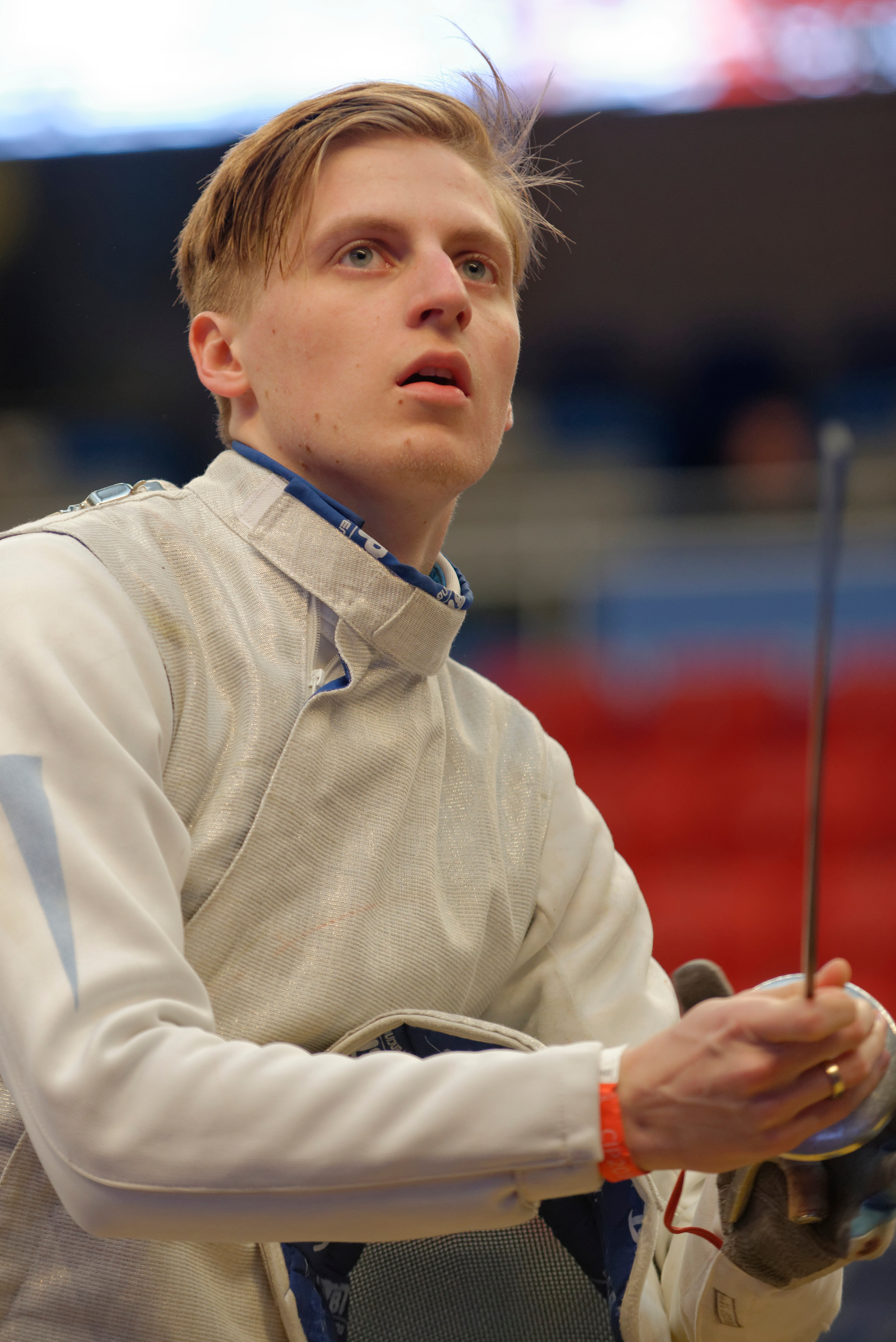
- Hertsyk at the 2014 Paris World Cup

Personal information
- Nationality: Ukraine
- Born: 5 July 1989 (age 37)
- Height: 1.86 m (6 ft 1 in)

Fencing career
- Sport: Fencing
- Weapon: Foil
- Hand: left-handed
- Club: Lviv
- FIE ranking: current ranking
Medal record
World Championships
| Bronze medal – third place | 2013 Budapest | Foil |
Summer Universiade
| Bronze medal – third place | 2017 Taipei | Foil |

Rostyslav Andriyovych Hertsyk (Ukrainian: Ростислав Андрійович Герцик; born 5 July 1989) is a Ukrainian foil fencer.

== Career ==
He was silver medallist at the Copa Villa La Habana in 2011 and bronze medallist at the Löwe von Bonn in 2012, but narrowly missed the qualifications for the 2012 Summer Olympics in London. 42nd in FIE rankings before the 2013 World Fencing Championships, he created an upset by defeating successively Peter Joppich, Race Imboden, and Andrea Cassarà. He lost in the semi-finals by Russia's Artur Akhmatkhuzin and earned a bronze medal. Hertsyk took part in October in the 2013 World Combat Games, but was defeated in the first round by Imboden, who eventually took the silver medal.

Hertsyk is a student at the Lviv State University of Physical Culture. He is the grandson of Miroslav Hertsyk, rector of the university and a key instrument in the development of rowing in the Lviv region.

== Links ==
- Profile at the European Fencing Confederation
