= Race Imboden =

American artist, creative director, and former Olympian fencer

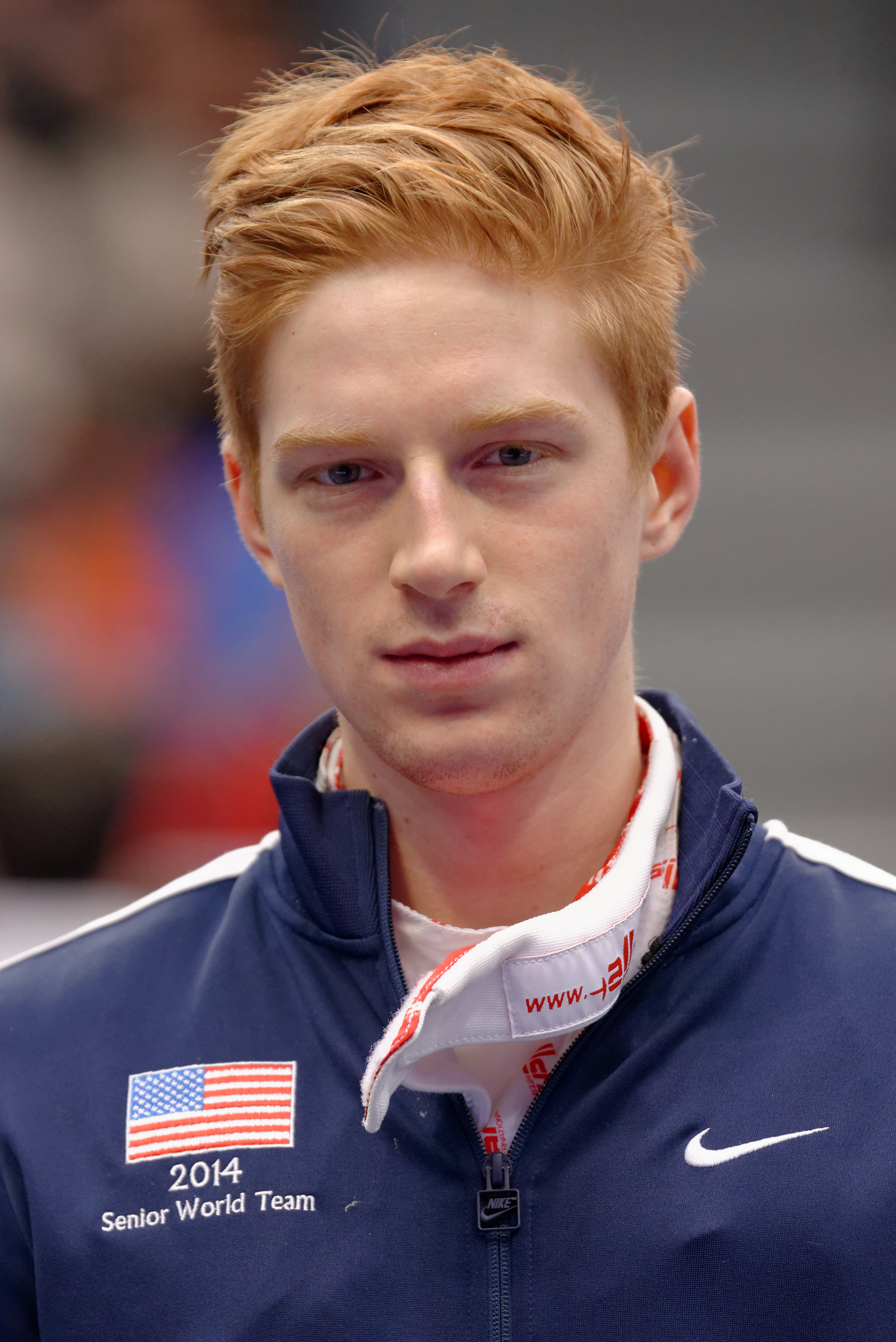
- Imboden in 2025

Personal information
- Full name: Race Alick Reid Imboden
- Born: April 17, 1993 (age 33) Tampa, Florida, U.S.
- Height: 1.89 m (6 ft 2 in)
- Weight: 172 lb (78 kg)

Fencing career
- Sport: Fencing
- Country: United States
- Weapon: Foil
- Hand: left-handed
Medal record
Men's foil
Representing the United States
Olympic Games
Bronze medal – third place	2016 Rio de Janeiro	Team
Bronze medal – third place	2020 Tokyo	Team
World Championships
Gold medal – first place	2019 Budapest	Team
Silver medal – second place	2013 Budapest	Team
Silver medal – second place	2017 Leipzig	Team
Silver medal – second place	2018 Wuxi	Team
Pan American Games
Gold medal – first place	2019 Lima	Team
Bronze medal – third place	2019 Lima	Individual
Pan American Championships
Gold medal – first place	2011 Reno	Individual
Gold medal – first place	2011 Reno	Team
Gold medal – first place	2012 Cancún	Individual
Gold medal – first place	2012 Cancún	Team
Gold medal – first place	2013 Cartagena	Team
Gold medal – first place	2014 San José	Team
Gold medal – first place	2015 Santiago	Individual
Gold medal – first place	2015 Santiago	Team
Gold medal – first place	2016 Panama City	Team
Gold medal – first place	2017 Montreal	Individual
Gold medal – first place	2017 Montreal	Team
Gold medal – first place	2018 Havana	Individual
Gold medal – first place	2018 Havana	Team
Gold medal – first place	2019 Toronto	Individual
Gold medal – first place	2019 Toronto	Team
Silver medal – second place	2013 Cartagena	Individual
Bronze medal – third place	2016 Panama City	Individual
National Championships
Gold medal – first place	2011 Portland	Individual
Gold medal – first place	2014 Minneapolis	Individual

Race Alick Reid Imboden (born April 17, 1993) is an American artist, filmmaker, and creative director, and a former left-handed foil fencer. He is a nine-time team Pan American champion, six-time individual Pan American champion, and a member of the gold medal-winning team at the 2019 World Fencing Championships. A three-time Olympian, Imboden is a two-time team Olympic bronze medalist. Following his competitive career, he transitioned into work across art, film, and fashion, developing projects in creative direction, design, and exhibition making.

== Personal life ==
Imboden was born in Tampa, Florida. His parents gave him his name after the Jonny Quest character Race Bannon. He moved to Atlanta at a young age. His first sports were inline skating and BMX; an inline skating accident left him with a crooked nose and a scar on his lip. He was playing with a toy sword in a park when a stranger suggested to his parents that he take up fencing. Shortly afterwards his family moved to Park Slope, Brooklyn, New York City. He attended the Bay Academy in Sheepshead Bay for middle school.

Imboden joined the Fencer's Club in Manhattan, where he first met Jed Dupree and Dan Kellner, both of whom were foil fencing Olympians at the 2004 Summer Olympics. They worked with him as a student, and Imboden made several connections. One lasting connection was that of the friendship to his long-time colleague Declan MacPherson, who Imboden notably gave an autograph to upon their first meeting. Imboden was educated at the Dwight School, which supported his budding sports career. His debut international competition came at age 14 when he won a bronze medal in the cadet (U17) 2010 world fencing championships. After graduating high school in spring 2011 he reconsidered his earlier signed intent to immediately attend Notre Dame, and took a year to focus on his training. He became a member of the Brooklyn Bridge Fencing Club, in the DUMBO section of Brooklyn, with Dan Kellner as his coach. He finally opted for St. John's University in New York, because it was closer to his family and coach.

Imboden's other passion is hip hop. He interned at independent label Fool's Gold in 2012 and is a DJ in his spare time.

Imboden and French foil fencer Ysaora Thibus met at a party after the Rio de Janeiro Olympic Games and began dating shortly afterward. The couple became engaged at the Théâtre Pigalle in Paris after the Tokyo Olympic Games. After Thibus tested positive for ostarine in a January 2024 doping test, the International Fencing Federation accepted her excuse that her saliva had been contaminated by kissing Imboden, a decision upheld in July 2025 by the Court of Arbitration for Sport on appeal from the World Anti-Doping Agency.

== Career ==
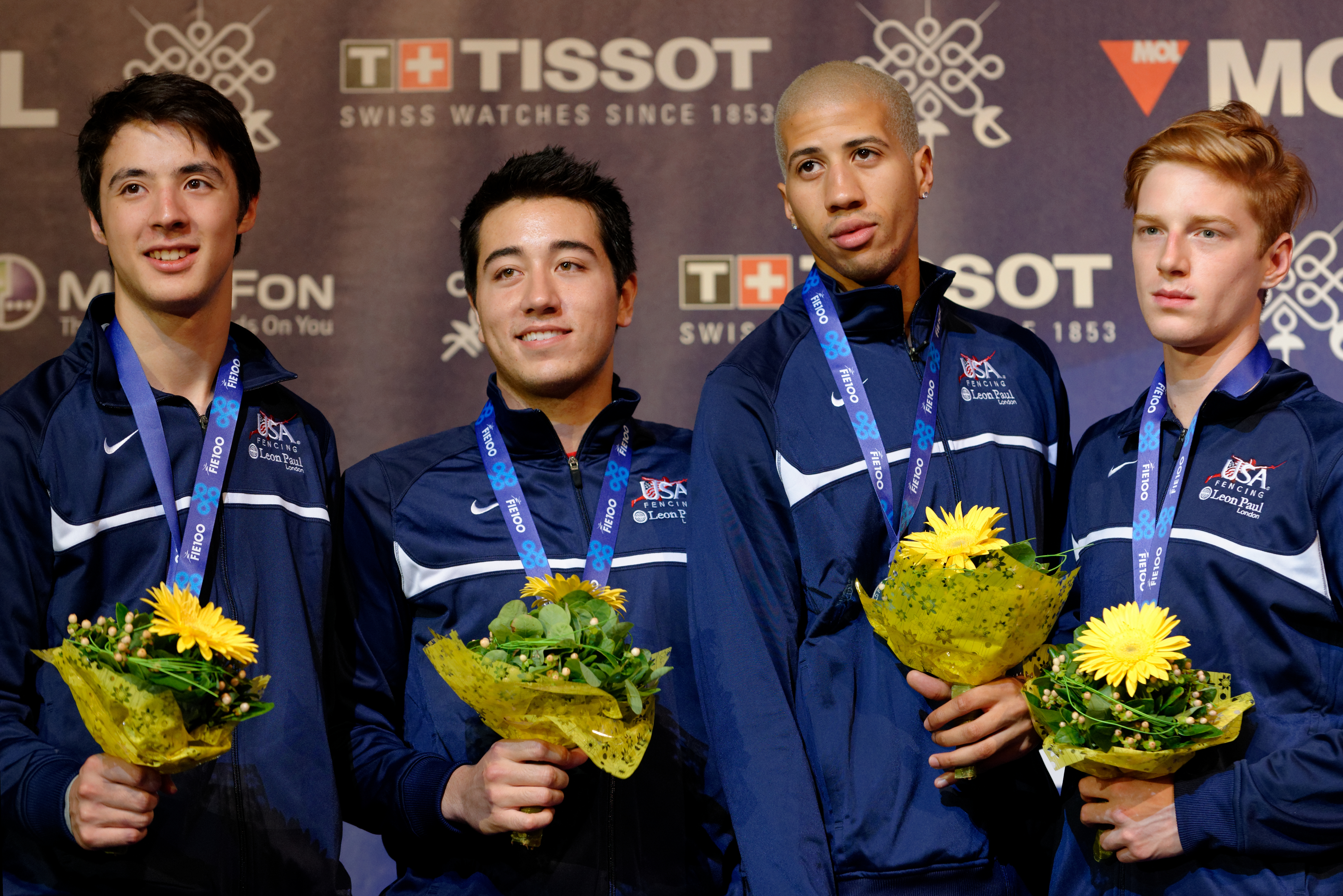
Imboden (right) with Team USA on the podium of the 2013 World Fencing Championships

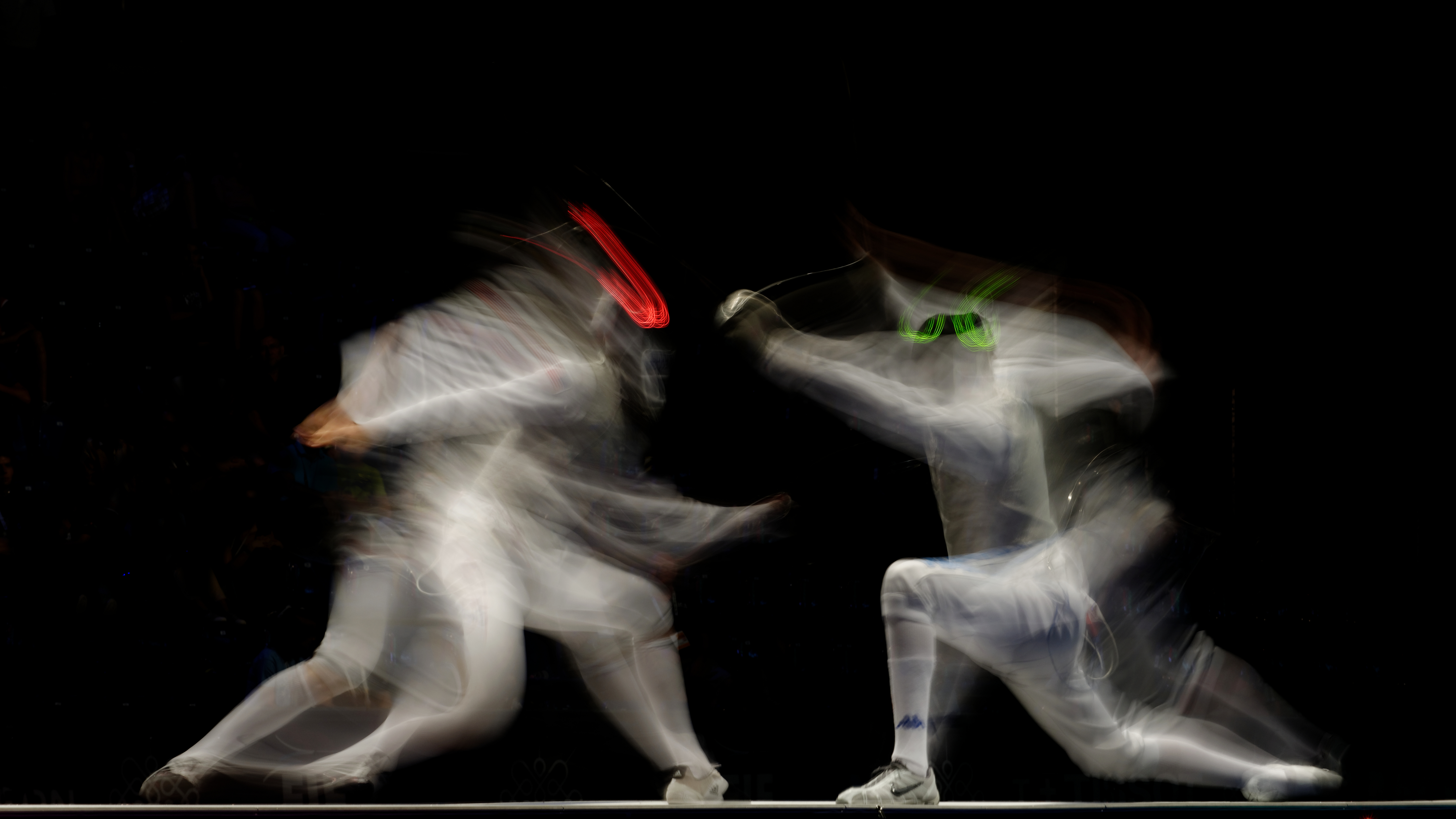
Imboden (left) fences against Italy's Andrea Cassarà (right) in the men's foil team final of the 2013 World Fencing Championships 2013 at Syma Hall in Budapest, 12 August 2013.

Imboden joined the national cadet (U17) team in 2010 and capped the year with the Cadet National Championship title. A year later, he was an individual titlist at the Senior National Championship in Portland, Oregon, and team foil titlist at the 2011 and 2012 Pan American Fencing Championships. At the age of 17, he made the senior national team for the 2011 World Championships in Catania. For his first participation to an event of this magnitude, he reached the quarter-finals after seeing off triple world titlist Peter Joppich, but lost to France's Victor Sintès.

At the beginning of the 2011–12 World Cup he stood on the World Cup podium for his bronze medal in the Challenge International de Paris. His good international results qualified him to the US national team to compete at the London 2012 Summer Olympics with the top-ranked team in the Americas zone. Seeded No. 4, he finished 9th after being eliminated in the table of 16 by Andrea Baldini of Italy. In the team event, No. 5 seeded USA prevailed over France, lost to Italy (who would win the gold medal), and a loss followed in the bronze medal match with Germany.

In 2013, Imboden won the gold medal at the 2013 Copa Villa La Habana, his first World Cup title, breaking a 14-year drought of US Foil World Cup titlists. He is now one of two US men's foil fencers to have won a World Cup competition. In June of the same year he won a silver medal in the Pan American fencing Championships in Cartagena after being defeated in the final by his teammate Gerek Meinhardt. At the 2013 World Fencing Championships in Budapest Imboden was defeated in the table of 16 by Ukraine's Rostyslav Hertsyk, who later earned a bronze medal. He took part in the team event for the United States, who lost the final to Italy and took the silver medal. Imboden finished 10th in the 2012–13 FIE world rankings.

Imboden began the 2013–14 season win a silver medal finish in the 2013 World Combat Games. He won his second USA Division-1 National Championship title in April 2014, defeating David Willette 15–6. He placed second in the SK Trophée in Seoul and third in the Prince Takamado World Cup. The World Championships in Kazan were a disappointment as Imboden was defeated in the table of 16 by teammate Gerek Meinhardt. In the team event, No.4 seed USA lost to eventual silver medallist China in the quarter-finals and finished fifth. Imboden finished the season world No.10 for the second time in a row.

In the 2014–15 season, Imboden made the quarter-finals in the San Francisco World Cup and proceeded to win gold at the Prince Takamodo World Cup in Tokyo after overcoming Russia's Dmitry Rigin in the final. He posted a third place in the Trofeo Inalpi in Turin, Italy. In January 2015 he achieved a double gold at the Challenge International de Paris: he became the first American to win the individual event after defeating Italy's Daniele Garozzo, then earned a second gold medal in the team event after Team USA prevailed over Italy. Imboden then took a bronze medal in the Havana Grand Prix. In April, he won the Master de Fleuret in Melun, prevailing over Ma Jianfei in the final. Two weeks later he earned the gold medal at the 2015 Pan American Championships in Santiago, his third individual Pan American title. The 2015 World Championships in Moscow proved a disappointment: Imboden was defeated in the table of 16 by Olympic champion Lei Sheng. In the team event, the United States lost to Italy in the quarter-finals and finished sixth after the placement rounds. Imboden did, however, ended the season World no.1, ten points ahead of newly crowned world champion Yuki Ota, thus becoming the first American male fencer to win the overall World Cup.

In the 2015–16 season, Imboden achieved another double-gold haul at the Paris World Cup, becoming the first fencer since Benjamin Kleibrink in 2006–2007 to win back-to-back editions. Three podiums out of three World Cup competitions sealed the United States' qualification to the team event of the 2016 Summer Olympics in Rio de Janeiro, guaranteeing three American slots in the individual event. Despite a further bronze medal at the Havana Grand Prix and a no.4 world ranking, Imboden was overtaken in the US rankings and qualified to the Olympics only as an alternate for the team event.

=== Pan-Am Games protest ===
At the 2019 Pan American Games in Lima, Peru, Imboden and teammates Gerek Meinhardt and Nick Itkin won gold medals for the US men's foil team. At the medal ceremony, Imboden knelt on one knee on the medal podium as the United States national anthem played; Meinhardt and Itkin remained standing. U.S. athletes "taking a knee" during the anthem had become a widespread protest symbol since 2016. Imboden stated in a post on Twitter that he had done so as a protest for gun control and against racism, mistreatment of immigrants, and the rhetoric of President Donald Trump. United States Olympic & Paralympic Committee spokesperson Mark Jones criticized Imboden, as all athletes are to commit to refraining from political actions and demonstrations, stating "In this case, Race didn't adhere to the commitment he made to the organizing committee and the USOPC. We respect his rights to express his viewpoints, but we are disappointed that he chose not to honor his commitment." Imboden had previously mounted a similar protest with a teammate at a World Cup event in Egypt in 2017.

We must call for change. This week I am honored to represent Team USA at the Pan Am Games, taking home Gold and Bronze. My pride however has been cut short by the multiple shortcomings of the country I hold so dear to my heart. Racism, Gun Control, mistreatment of immigrants, and a president who spreads hate are at the top of a long list. I chose to sacrifie [sic: read sacrifice] my moment today at the top of the podium to call attention to issues that I believe need to be addressed. I encourage others to please use your platforms for empowerment and change.

— Race Imboden

On 21 August 2019, Imboden was placed on a twelve-month probation by the U.S. Olympic and Paralympic Committee for his protest at the Pan American Games.

=== Subsequent career ===
Imboden again qualified as an alternate to represent the United States in fencing at the 2020 Olympics in Tokyo in 2021 where the US team won its second consecutive bronze medal in the team foil competition.

Imboden officially retired from fencing in 2023.

== Creative career ==
Following his retirement from fencing, Imboden began working across art, film, fashion, and creative direction. He is the founder and director of Race Imboden Company, an experimental space in Paris that operates across fashion, objects, exhibitions, and events. The studio develops garments and objects from concept through production, while also producing exhibitions, environments, and live formats.

Race Imboden Company has presented work at The Broken Arm in Paris and developed a specialized garment project in association with Perrotin for a dance performance. In 2025, the studio produced a ten-artist group exhibition at Fondazione Sozzani Founded by Carla Sozzani.

=== Exhibition 01 ===
In April 2025, Imboden produced Exhibition 01, a group exhibition presented by Race Imboden Company at Fondazione Sozzani in Paris. The exhibition was curated by Nogoflani Fofana and brought together artists working across disciplines including image, sound, sculpture, and mixed media.

Participating artists included Dozie Kanu alongside Eugène Blove, François Durel, Damsel Elysium, Hugo Hectus, Marie Matusz, Noémie Ninot, Polina Osipova, Jackson Whitefield, and Hans Witschi.

The exhibition also included a public talk featuring Dan Thawley, Hunter Amos, and Hugo Hectus.

=== Office of Operations ===
Imboden is co-founder of Office of Operations (O/O), a special projects studio working across film, image direction, scenography, and visual strategy. The studio develops projects for artists, musicians, institutions, and commercial clients. Through Office of Operations, Imboden has worked across creative direction and production, contributing to visual campaigns, films, and spatial projects. The studio has developed visual work with musicians including Ethel, including music video production. The studio has also developed projects with musicians including Banshee and Pip Millett. In addition to commissioned work, it produces editorial projects and publications.

== Medal record ==
=== Olympic Games ===
Year	Location	Event	Position
2016	Rio de Janeiro, Brazil	Team Men's Foil	3rd
2021	Tokyo, Japan	Team Men's Foil	3rd

=== World Championship ===
Year	Location	Event	Position
2013	Budapest, Hungary	Team Men's Foil	2nd
2017	Leipzig, Germany	Team Men's Foil	2nd
2018	Wuxi, China	Team Men's Foil	2nd
2019	Budapest, Hungary	Team Men's Foil	1st

=== Grand Prix ===
Date	Location	Event	Position
2014-05-03	Tokyo, Japan	Individual Men's Foil	3rd
2014-11-28	Turin, Italy	Individual Men's Foil	3rd
2015-03-13	Havana, Cuba	Individual Men's Foil	3rd
2016-03-11	Havana, Cuba	Individual Men's Foil	3rd
2018-03-16	(United States) Anaheim, California	Individual Men's Foil	1st
2018-05-19	Shanghai, China	Individual Men's Foil	3rd
2019-02-08	Turin, Italy	Individual Men's Foil	1st
2020-02-07	Turin, Italy	Individual Men's Foil	3rd
2021-03-26	Doha, Qatar	Individual Men's Foil	3rd

=== World Cup ===
Date	Location	Event	Position
2012-01-27	Paris, France	Individual Men's Foil	3rd
2012-05-18	Seoul, South Korea	Individual Men's Foil	3rd
2013-05-24	Havana, Cuba	Individual Men's Foil	1st
2014-04-25	Seoul, South Korea	Individual Men's Foil	2nd
2014-11-07	Tokyo, Japan	Individual Men's Foil	1st
2015-01-16	Paris, France	Individual Men's Foil	1st
2016-01-15	Paris, France	Individual Men's Foil	1st
2016-10-21	Cairo, Egypt	Individual Men's Foil	1st
2017-02-10	Bonn, Germany	Individual Men's Foil	3rd
2017-10-20	Cairo, Egypt	Individual Men's Foil	3rd
2019-01-11	Paris, France	Individual Men's Foil	3rd
2019-01-25	Tokyo, Japan	Individual Men's Foil	2nd

=== Pan American Championship ===
Year	Location	Event	Position
2011	(United States) Reno, Nevada	Individual Men's Foil	1st
2011	(United States) Reno, Nevada	Team Men's Foil	1st
2012	Cancún, Mexico	Individual Men's Foil	1st
2012	Cancún, Mexico	Team Men's Foil	1st
2013	Cartagena, Colombia	Individual Men's Foil	2nd
2013	Cartagena, Colombia	Team Men's Foil	1st
2014	San José, Costa Rica	Team Men's Foil	1st
2015	Santiago, Chile	Individual Men's Foil	1st
2015	Santiago, Chile	Team Men's Foil	1st
2016	Panama City, Panama	Individual Men's Foil	3rd
2016	Panama City, Panama	Team Men's Foil	1st
2017	Montreal, Canada	Individual Men's Foil	1st
2017	Montreal, Canada	Team Men's Foil	1st
2018	Havana, Cuba	Individual Men's Foil	1st
2018	Havana, Cuba	Team Men's Foil	1st
2019	Toronto, Canada	Individual Men's Foil	1st
2019	Toronto, Canada	Team Men's Foil	1st

== See also ==
- List of USFA Division I National Champions
