= Tomer Or =

Israeli fencer (born 1978)

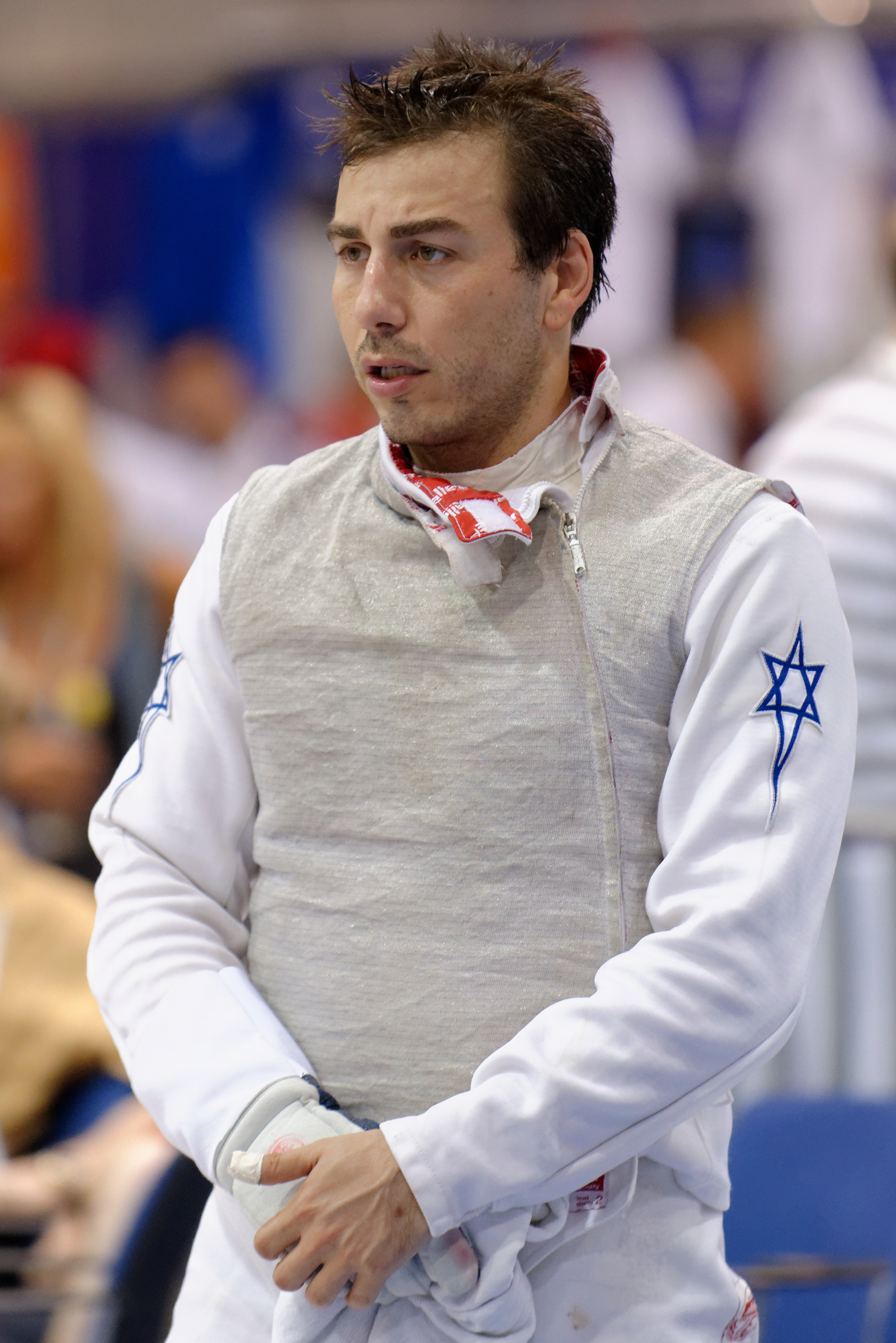
- Or at the 2013 World Fencing Championships

Personal information
- Native name: תומר אור
- Nationality: Israel
- Born: 26 September 1978 (age 47) Haifa
- Height: 1.77 m (5 ft 10 in)
- Weight: 79 kg (174 lb)

Fencing career
- Sport: Fencing
- Weapon: Foil
- Hand: right-handed
- Years on national team: Israel
- National coach: udi carmi,
- Club: Hapoel Haifa; CE Melun Val de Seine
- FIE ranking: current ranking

Tomer Or (Hebrew: תומר אור; born September 26, 1978) is an Israeli foil fencer.

== Early life ==
Or is Jewish, and was born in Haifa, Israel. He earned an LL.B. in Law and Business from the Interdisciplinary Center, in Herzliya, Israel.

== Fencing career ==
Or began fencing at the age of eight, fenced at Hapoel Haifa, in Haifa, Israel, and was coached by Ohad Balva and Haim Hatuel.

Or won the gold medal at the 1998 Junior World Championship in Valencia, Venezuela, and the silver medal in 1994 in Mexico City, Mexico.

He is a 10-time Israel Senior National Champion. He won gold medals in Senior World Cups in Budapest (2002), Copenhagen (2005), Vancouver (2006), and Havana (2007).

He fenced on behalf of Israel at the 2008 Summer Olympics in Beijing, China, and came in 17th.

At the 2009 World Fencing Championships, he advanced to the third round when his scheduled opponent, Mohammed Hussein Ibrahimi, failed to show up, part of a pattern of Iranians not showing up to face Israelis at the competition.

In 2009, he won the gold medal at the 2009 Maccabiah Games in men's foil.

He came in fifth at the 2014 European Fencing Championships in Strasbourg, France.

== Coaching career ==
Or received his coaching diploma from Wingate Institute for Physical Education and Sport in Netanya, Israel, in 2005. He started his coaching career 2005 at the Haifa Fencing Club in Israel. From 2010 he was assistant coach at St John's University in New York City, before he returned to Israel.
