= Men's sabre at the 2013 World Fencing Championships =

The Men's sabre event of the 2013 World Fencing Championships was held on August 7, 2013. The qualification was held on August 5, 2013.

== Medalists ==
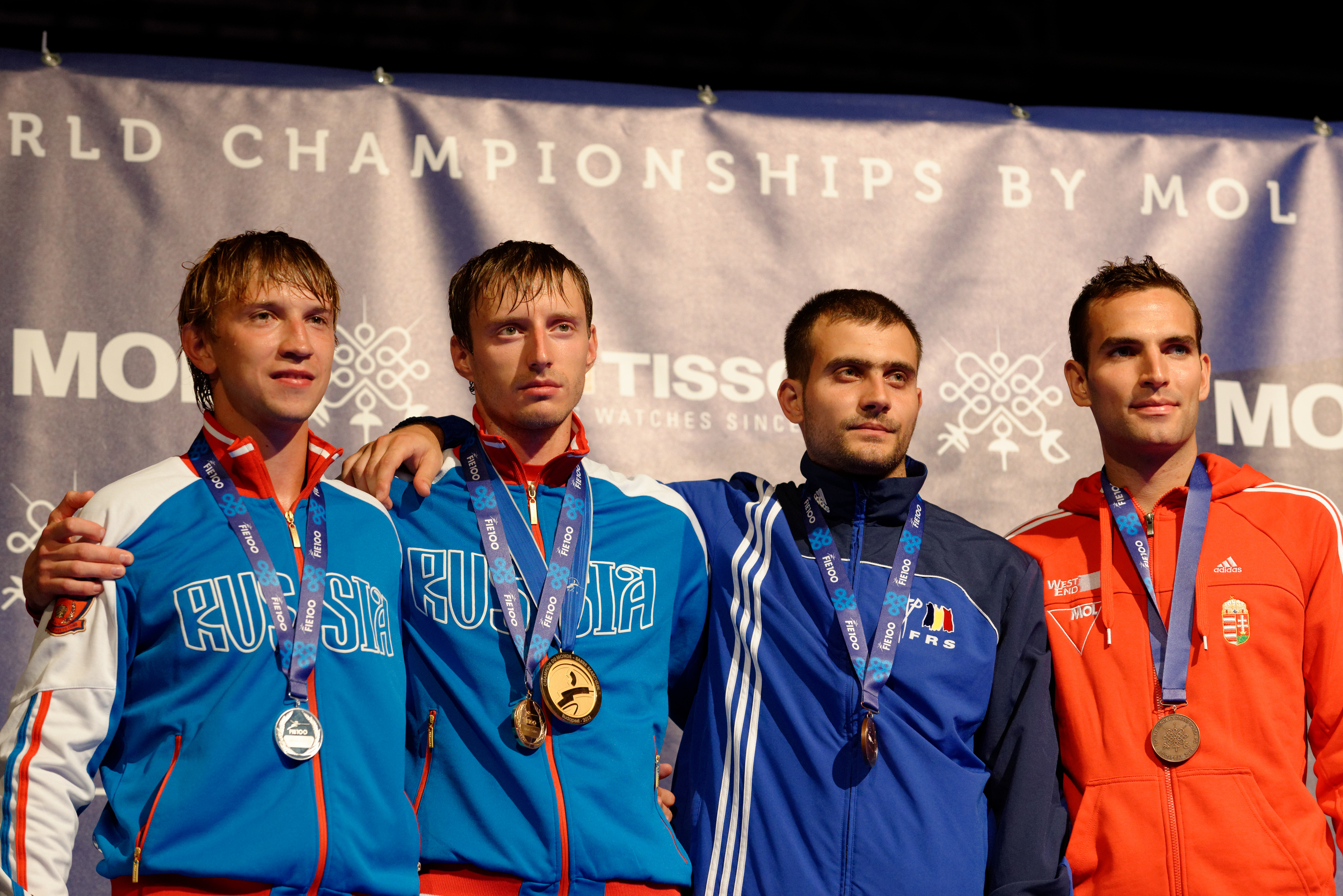
On the podium: from left to right, Nikolay Kovalev, Veniamin Reshetnikov, Tiberiu Dolniceanu, and Áron Szilágyi

Gold	Veniamin Reshetnikov (RUS)
Silver	Nikolay Kovalev (RUS)
Bronze	Tiberiu Dolniceanu (ROU)
Bronze	Áron Szilágyi (HUN)

== Draw ==
=== Finals ===
All times are (UTC+2)

Semi-finals
18:50
(Russia) Veniamin Reshetnikov	15
(Romania) Tiberiu Dolniceanu	10
19:05
(Russia) Nikolay Kovalev	15
(Hungary) Áron Szilágyi	14

Final
19:45
(Russia) Veniamin Reshetnikov	15
(Russia) Nikolay Kovalev	13

=== Top half ===
==== Blue piste ====
Round of 64
1	(Italy) Diego Occhiuzzi	15
64	(United Kingdom) Soji Aiyenuro	6
33	(Hong Kong) Low Ho Tin	8
32	(Georgia (country)) Sandro Bazadze	15
17	(Germany) Max Hartung	15
48	(France) Julien Pillet	9
49	(Japan) Tomohiro Shimamura	0
16	(Russia) Kamil Ibragimov	15
9	(Germany) Nicolas Limbach	15
56	(Georgia (country)) Saba Sulamanidze	4
41	(Belgium) Seppe van Holsbeke	8
24	(Ukraine) Dmytro Pundyk	15
25	(Poland) Marcin Koniusz	11
40	(Israel) Alexandre Woog	15
57	(France) Nicolas Rousset	14
8	(Russia) Veniamin Reshetnikov	15

Round of 32
1	(Italy) Diego Occhiuzzi	14
32	(Georgia (country)) Sandro Bazadze	15
17	(Germany) Max Hartung	15
16	(Russia) Kamil Ibragimov	10
9	(Germany) Nicolas Limbach	15
24	(Ukraine) Dmytro Pundyk	10
40	(Israel) Alexandre Woog	8
8	(Russia) Veniamin Reshetnikov	15

Round of 16
32	(Georgia (country)) Sandro Bazadze	11
17	(Germany) Max Hartung	15
9	(Germany) Nicolas Limbach	9
8	(Russia) Veniamin Reshetnikov	15

Quarterfinals
17	(Germany) Max Hartung	14
8	(Russia) Veniamin Reshetnikov	15

==== Yellow piste ====
Round of 64
5	(Romania) Tiberiu Dolniceanu	15
60	(Japan) Kenta Tokunan	7
37	(France) Vincent Anstett	12
28	(Ukraine) Dmytro Boiko	15
21	(United States) Eli Dershwitz	12
44	(Germany) Matyas Szabo	15
53	(Senegal) Mamoudou Keita	10
12	(Italy) Luigi Samele	15
13	(Italy) Enrico Berrè	15
52	(Ukraine) Andriy Yagodka	13
45	(Belarus) Valery Pryiemka	15
20	(Romania) Iulian Teodosiu	7
29	(Canada) Philippe Beaudry	5
36	(France) Boladé Apithy	15
61	(Canada) Shaul Gordon	8
4	(South Korea) Gu Bon-gil	15

Round of 32
5	(Romania) Tiberiu Dolniceanu	15
28	(Ukraine) Dmytro Boiko	7
44	(Germany) Matyas Szabo	12
12	(Italy) Luigi Samele	15
13	(Italy) Enrico Berrè	15
45	(Belarus) Valery Pryiemka	11
36	(France) Boladé Apithy	8
4	(South Korea) Gu Bon-gil	15

Round of 16
5	(Romania) Tiberiu Dolniceanu	15
12	(Italy) Luigi Samele	12
13	(Italy) Enrico Berrè	15
4	(South Korea) Gu Bon-gil	12

Quarterfinals
5	(Romania) Tiberiu Dolniceanu	15
13	(Italy) Enrico Berrè	4

=== Bottom half ===
==== Green piste ====
Round of 64
3	(Russia) Nikolay Kovalev	15
62	(Singapore) Chan David Wei Ren	5
35	(Benin) Yemi Geoffrey Apithy	14
30	(Brazil) Renzo Agresta	15
19	(United Kingdom) James Honeybone	9
46	(South Korea) Oh Eun-seok	15
51	(Hong Kong) Chang Chi Hin Cyrus	9
14	(South Korea) Kim Jung-hwan	15
11	(Russia) Aleksey Yakimenko	15
54	(China) Jiang Kelü	10
43	(United States) Jeff Spear	13
22	(Romania) Alin Badea	15
27	(Canada) Joseph Polossifakis	11
38	(Hungary) András Szatmári	15
59	(Belarus) Aliaksei Likhacheuski	15
6	(Germany) Benedikt Wagner	13

Round of 32
3	(Russia) Nikolay Kovalev	15
30	(Brazil) Renzo Agresta	9
46	(South Korea) Oh Eun-seok	11
14	(South Korea) Kim Jung-hwan	15
11	(Russia) Aleksey Yakimenko	12
22	(Romania) Alin Badea	15
38	(Hungary) András Szatmári	15
59	(Belarus) Aliaksei Likhacheuski	13

Round of 16
3	(Russia) Nikolay Kovalev	15
14	(South Korea) Kim Jung-hwan	13
22	(Romania) Alin Badea	13
38	(Hungary) András Szatmári	15

Quarterfinals
3	(Russia) Nikolay Kovalev	15
38	(Hungary) András Szatmári	14

==== Red piste ====
Round of 64
7	(United States) Daryl Homer	15
58	(Spain) Pablo Moreno	8
39	(United States) Aleksander Ochocki	6
26	(Hungary) Csanád Gémesi	15
23	(Ukraine) Oleh Shturbabin	15
42	(South Korea) Won Jun-ho	13
55	(Vietnam) Vũ Thành An	14
10	(Belarus) Aliaksandr Buikevich	15
15	(Spain) Fernando Casares	15
50	(Kazakhstan) Yevgeni Frolov	7
47	(China) Sun Wei	8
18	(Italy) Aldo Montano	15
31	(Poland) Adam Skrodzki	10
34	(Romania) Ciprian Gălățanu	15
63	(Spain) Sergio Escudero	6
2	(Hungary) Áron Szilágyi	15

Round of 32
7	(United States) Daryl Homer	13
26	(Hungary) Csanád Gémesi	15
23	(Ukraine) Oleh Shturbabin	10
10	(Belarus) Aliaksandr Buikevich	15
15	(Spain) Fernando Casares	14
18	(Italy) Aldo Montano	15
34	(Romania) Ciprian Gălățanu	10
2	(Hungary) Áron Szilágyi	15

Round of 16
26	(Hungary) Csanád Gémesi	15
10	(Belarus) Aliaksandr Buikevich	10
18	(Italy) Aldo Montano	9
2	(Hungary) Áron Szilágyi	15

Quarterfinals
26	(Hungary) Csanád Gémesi	9
2	(Hungary) Áron Szilágyi	15

== Final classification ==
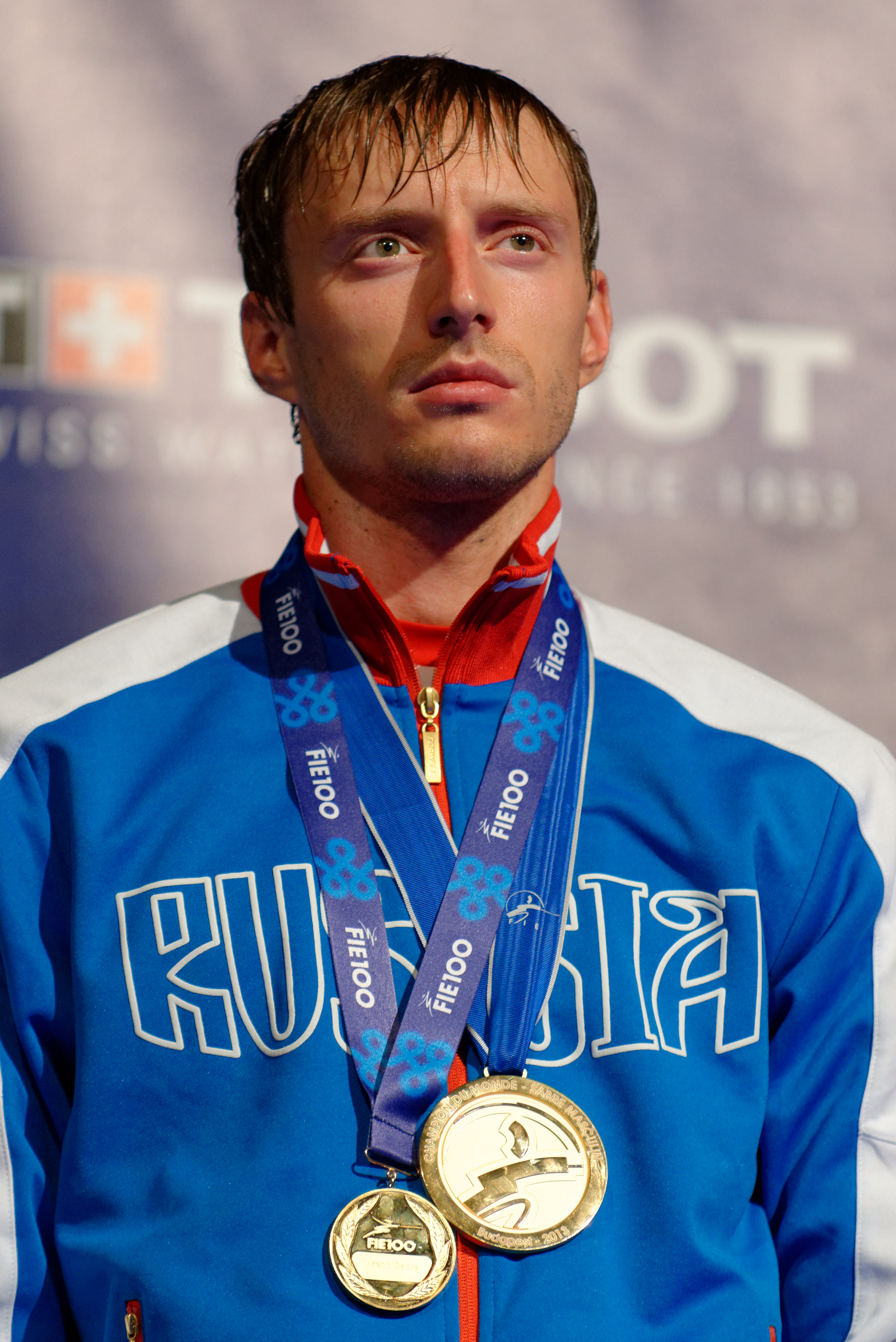
2013 World Champion Veniamin Reshetnikov

Rank	Athlete	Nation
1st place, gold medalist(s)	Veniamin Reshetnikov	Russia
2nd place, silver medalist(s)	Nikolay Kovalev	Russia
3rd place, bronze medalist(s)	Tiberiu Dolniceanu	Romania
3rd place, bronze medalist(s)	Áron Szilágyi	Hungary
5	Enrico Berrè	Italy
6	Max Hartung	Germany
7	Csanád Gémesi	Hungary
8	András Szatmári	Hungary
9	Gu Bon-Gil	South Korea
10	Nicolas Limbach	Germany
11	Aliaksandr Buikevich	Belarus
12	Luigi Samele	Italy
13	Kim Jung-Hwan	South Korea
14	Aldo Montano	Italy
15	Alin Badea	Romania
16	Sandro Bazadze	Georgia
17	Diego Occhiuzzi	Italy
18	Daryl Homer	United States
19	Aleksey Yakimenko	Russia
20	Fernando Casares	Spain
21	Kamil Ibragimov	Russia
22	Dmytro Pundyk	Ukraine
22	Oleh Shturbabin	Ukraine
24	Dmytro Boiko	Ukraine
25	Renzo Agresta	Brazil
26	Ciprian Gălățanu	Romania
27	Boladé Apithy	France
28	Alexandre Woog	Israel
29	Matyas Szabo	Germany
30	Valery Pryiemka	Belarus
31	Oh Eun-Seok	South Korea
32	Aliaksei Likhacheuski	Belarus
33	Benedikt Wagner	Germany
34	James Honeybone	Great Britain
35	Iulian Teodosiu	Romania
36	Eli Dershwitz	United States
37	Marcin Koniusz	Poland
38	Joseph Polossifakis	Canada
39	Philippe Beaudry	Canada
40	Adam Skrodzki	Poland
41	Low Ho Tin	Hong Kong
42	Yemi Geoffrey Apithy	Benin
43	Vincent Anstett	France
44	Aleksander Ochocki	United States
45	Seppe Van Holsbeke	Belgium
46	Won Jun-Ho	South Korea
47	Jeff Spear	United States
48	Sun Wei	China
49	Julien Pillet	France
50	Tomohiro Shimamura	Japan
51	Yevgeni Frolov	Kazakhstan
52	Chang Chi Hin Cyrus	Hong Kong
53	Andriy Yagodka	Ukraine
54	Mamoudou Keita	Senegal
55	Jiang Kelü	China
56	Vũ Thành An	Vietnam
57	Saba Sulamanidze	Georgia
58	Nicolas Rousset	France
59	Pablo Moreno	Spain
60	Kenta Tokunan	Japan
61	Shaul Gordon	Canada
62	Chan David Wei Ren	Singapore
63	Sergio Escudero	Spain
64	Soji Aiyenuro	Great Britain
65	Ricardo Alberto Bustamante	Argentina
66	Mohammad Rahbari	Iran
67	Lam Hin Chung	Hong Kong
68	Alexei Romanovitch	Belarus
69	Mikolaj Grzegorek	Poland
70	Caglayan Nehir Firat	Turkey
71	Zhanserik Turlybekov	Kazakhstan
72	Nikolász Iliász	Hungary
73	Julian Ayala	Mexico
74	Ziad Elsissy	Egypt
75	Alvaro Lopez Mendez	Spain
76	Jesus Carvajal	Venezuela
77	Adrian Acuna Ramirez	Mexico
78	Juan Vega	Mexico
79	Abraham Rodriguez	Venezuela
80	Farzad Baher Aresbaran	Iran
81	Jose M Gonzalez Dalmasy	Puerto Rico
82	Lyuboslav Burnev	Bulgaria
83	Alexander Crutchett	Great Britain
84	Ilya Mokretcov	Kazakhstan
85	Ali Pakdaman	Iran
86	Leu Clive Yi Yang	Singapore
87	Wu Jie	China
88	Hernan Jansen Brito	Venezuela
89	Aly Adel	Egypt
90	Choy Yu Yong	Singapore
91	Ahmed Amr	Egypt
91	Beka Bazadze	Georgia
93	Teddy Weller	U.S. Virgin Islands
94	Mojtaba Abedini	Iran
95	Kohta Arai	Japan
96	Jakub Ocinski	Poland
97	Mark Peros	Canada
98	Shun Tanaka	Japan
99	Khaled Alshamlan	Kuwait
100	Guido Eduardo Mulero	Argentina
101	Tywilliam Guzenski	Brazil
102	Alexander Achten	Argentina
103	Yan Hon Pan	Hong Kong
104	Ibrahima Keita	Senegal
105	Jan Doležal	Czech Republic
105	Curtis Miller	Great Britain
107	Adam Wilcock	Australia
108	Atanas Arnaudov	Bulgaria
109	Enrico Pezzi	Brazil
110	Willian Zeytounlian	Brazil
111	Zak Leonhard	Australia
112	Sutherlan Scudds	Australia
113	Ibrahim Ahmet Ant	Turkey
114	Joaquin Alberto Tobar Martinez	El Salvador
115	Carlos Correa Vila	Colombia
116	Gian Carlo Nocom	Philippines
117	Yeraly Tilenshiyev	Kazakhstan
118	Yaniv Maimon	Israel
119	Tseng Lin Fang	Singapore
120	Luis Leal	Venezuela
121	Evangelos Sarris	Greece
122	Maykel Berezovsky	Israel
122	Tarik Ruiz	Chile
124	Sebastian Cuellar	Colombia
125	Nebojsa Sreckovic	Serbia
126	Luis Correa Vila	Colombia
126	Jan Hoschna	Czech Republic
128	Mikheil Mardaleishvili	Georgia
129	Huzaimi Kassim	Brunei
130	Sadesh Chandana	Sri Lanka
131	Brayner Hernandez Espinal	Honduras
132	Jean Pérez	Paraguay
