= Men's team sabre at the 2010 World Fencing Championships =

The Men's team sabre event took place on November 9, 2010 at Grand Palais.

== Sabre team ==
| Position | Country | Name |
|---|---|---|
| 1. | Russia | Nikolay Kovalev; Veniamin Reshetnikov; Aleksey Yakimenko; Artem Zanin |
| 2. | Italy | Aldo Montano; Diego Occhiuzzi; Luigi Samele; Luigi Tarantino |
| 3. | Romania | Tiberiu Dolniceanu; Rareș Dumitrescu; Cosmin Hănceanu; Florin Zalomir |
| 4. | Belarus | Dmitri Lapkes; Valery Pryiemka; Aliaksandr Buikevich; Aliaksei Likhacheuski |
| 5. | Germany | Benedikt Beisheim; Max Hartung; Nicolas Limbach; Johannes Klebes |
| 6. | China | Jiang Kelü; Zhong Man; Liu Xiao; Wang Jingzhi |
| 7. | Ukraine | Dmytro Boyko; Andriy Yagodka; Dmytro Pundyk; Oleh Shturbabin |
| 8. | South Korea | Kim Jung-hwan; Oh Eun-seok; Won Woo-young; Gu Bon-gil |

Quarter-finals
Italy | 45
Ukraine | 29
Belarus | 45
China | 37
South Korea | 32
Russia | 45
Germany | 42
Romania | 45

Semi-finals
Italy | 45
Belarus | 25
Russia | 45
Romania | 32

Final
Italy | 41
Russia | 45
Third place
Belarus | 41
Romania | 45
