= Iulian Teodosiu =

Romanian fencer (born 1994)

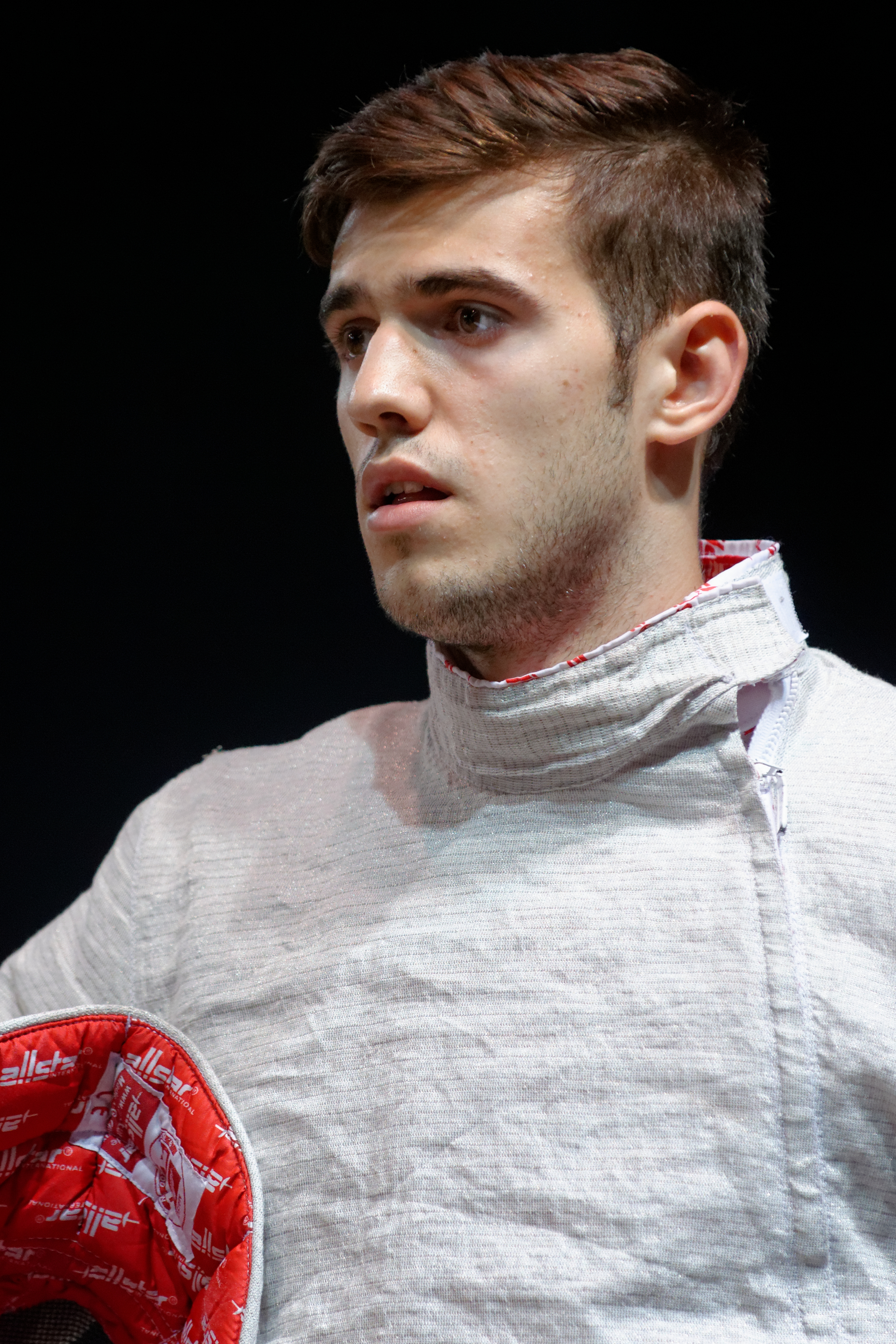

Personal information
- Nicknames: Iuli, Teo
- Nationality: Romanian
- Born: 30 September 1994 (age 31) Slobozia, Ialomița County
- Home town: Bucharest

Fencing career
- Sport: Fencing
- Weapon: Sabre
- Hand: right-handed
- National coach: Mihai Covaliu
- Club: CS Dinamo București
- FIE ranking: current ranking
Medal record
Men's sabre
Representing Romania
World Championships
Silver medal – second place	2013 Budapest	Team
Bronze medal – third place	2016 Rio de Janeiro	Team
Bronze medal – third place	2022 Cairo	Individual
European Games
Silver medal – second place	2015 Baku	Team
European Championships
Bronze medal – third place	2016 Toruń	Team

Iulian Teodosiu (born 30 September 1994) is a Romanian sabre fencer, winning a team silver medal in the 2013 World Fencing Championships.

== Career ==
Teodosiu took up fencing at the age of 9 after coaches from his local club, CSS Slobozia, came at his school to do a presentation. He describes this first contact as "love at first sight". Teodosiu practiced sabre along with future teammate Alin Badea under coaches Marin Mihăiță and Marius Pușcașu.

Teodosiu joined the national team at the age of 18, after the 2012 Summer Olympics, when three of its four members retired from sport. His first competition with the team was the Madrid World Cup, where Romania earned a bronze medal. Mădălin Bucur was selected in his place for the 2013 European Fencing Championships in Zagreb, but head coach Mihai Covaliu called him back as reserve for the World Championships in Budapest. In the individual event, he was eliminated in the table of 64 by Valery Pryiemka of Belarus. In the team event, Romania defeated Australia, then Poland, and hosts Hungary to meet Belarus in the semi-final. Teodosiu entered the piste on 30-24 for Belarus and defeated Aliaksei Likhacheuski 11–4 to give his team the lead. Romania finally prevailed 45–44. In the final against Russia, Teodosiu lost 5–7 his first relay against Nikolay Kovalev, as well his second, with 4–6 against newly crowned World champion Veniamin Reshetnikov. Romania were defeated 45–38 and took the silver medal.

Teodosiu joined CS Dinamo in the 2013–14 season. With his new club he won the European Champion Clubs' Cup in Gödöllő, closing the final against Hungary's Vasas SC after his captain Tiberiu Dolniceanu was injured. In the European Championships in Strasbourg, Teodosiu lost in the table of 64 against Hungary's Tamás Decsi. In the team event, Romania met Belarus in the quarter-finals. Teodosiu entered the last leg on 40–42 to replace injured Alin Badea. He could not prevent Aliaksandr Buikevich from closing 45–41. Romania then entered the placement rounds and defeated Ukraine and Hungary to finish No.5. In the World Championships in Kazan, Teodosiu was eliminated in the table of 64 by Veniamin Reshetnikov. In the team event, Romania met Olympic champion South Korea in the quarter-finals. Teodosiu gave his team an early lead, which he later consolidated against Won Woo-young, but Romania were eventually defeated 45–41 and finished 7th after the placement rounds.

He won one of the bronze medals in the men's sabre event at the 2022 World Fencing Championships held in Cairo, Egypt.

Teodosiu graduated from National College Mihai Viteazul in Slobozia. He studies psychology.
