= Ciprian Gălățanu =

Romanian fencer (born 1989)

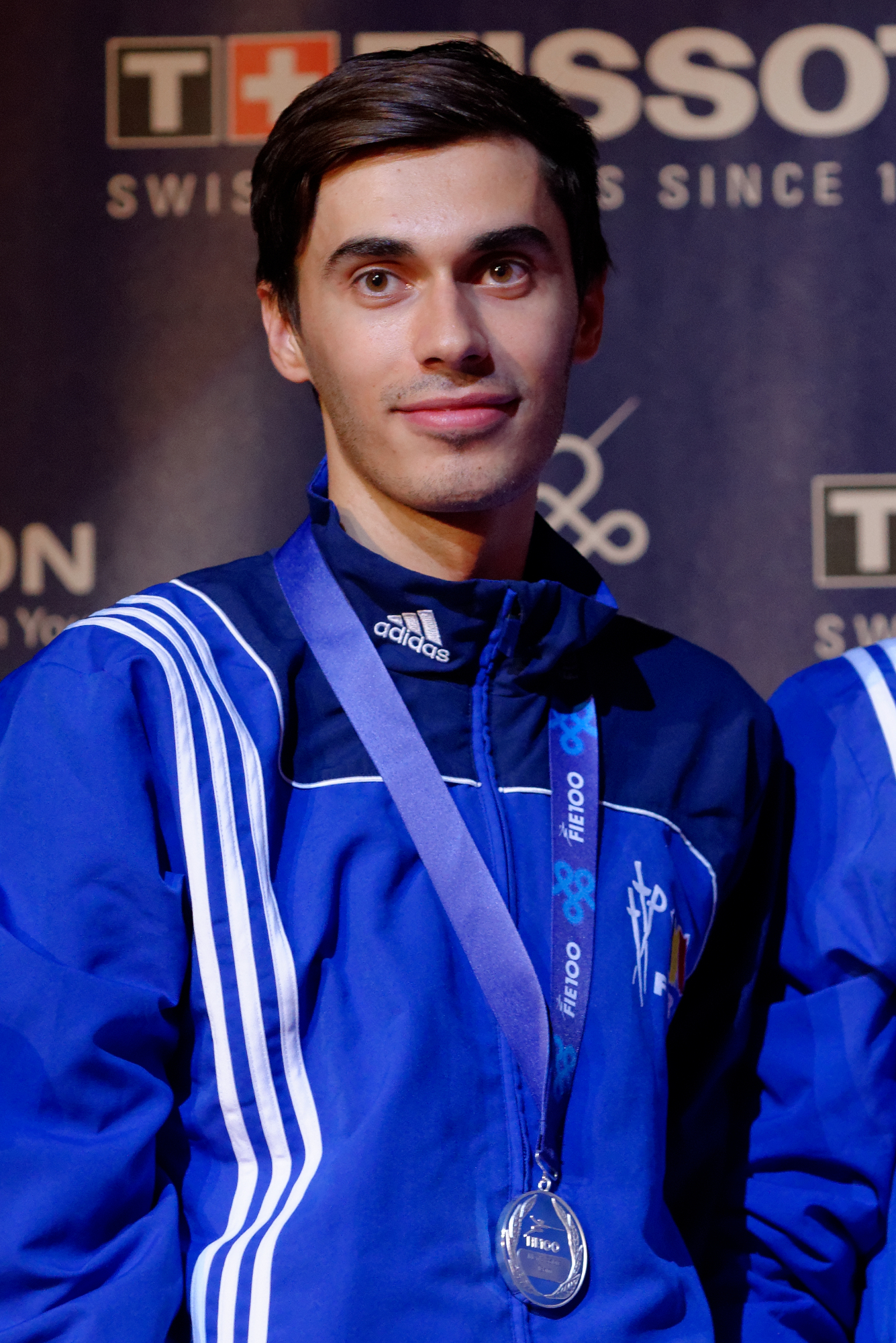
- Gălățanu at the 2013 World Fencing Championships

Personal information
- Nationality: Romanian
- Born: 17 November 1989 (age 36) Brașov, Transylvania
- Home town: Bucharest, Romania

Fencing career
- Sport: Fencing
- Weapon: Sabre
- Hand: right-handed
- National coach: Mihai Covaliu
- Club: Dinamo București
- Former coach: Iulian Bițucă
- FIE ranking: current ranking
Medal record
World Championships
Silver medal – second place	2013 Budapest	Team
Bronze medal – third place	2016 Rio de Janeiro	Team

Ciprian Gălățanu (born 17 November 1989) is a Romanian sabre fencer, team silver medallist in the 2013 World Fencing Championships.

== Career ==
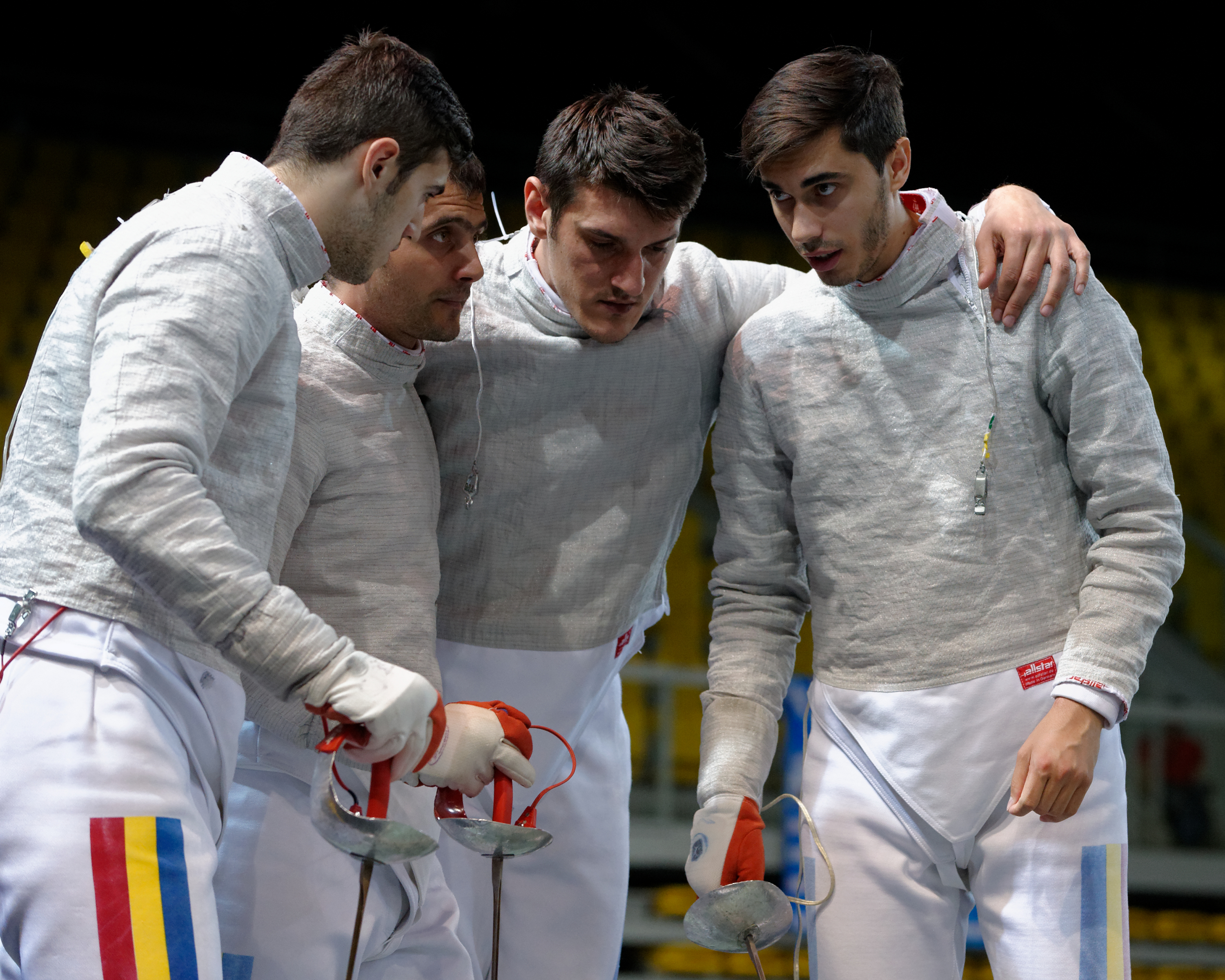
Gălățanu (right) huddles with team-mates at the 2014 European Championships

Gălățanu took up fencing at CSM Iași under the coaching of Iulian Bițucă. He joined the national team after the 2012 Summer Olympics, when three of its four members retired from sport. His first competition with the team was the Madrid World Cup, where Romania earned a bronze medal. In the 2013 European Championships in Zagreb he reached the quarter-finals, where he was defeated by his captain Tiberiu Dolniceanu. In the team event, Romania were overcome by Italy in the semi-finals, then by Ukraine in the small final, and finished 4th.

At the World Championships in Budapest, Gălățanu was stopped in the second round of the individual event by reigning Olympic champion Áron Szilágyi. In the team event, Romania edged out hosts Hungary in the quarter-finals, then Belarus, but were beaten by Russia in the final and came away with the silver medal. Gălățanu finished the season No.37 in World rankings, a career best as of 2014.

In the 2013–14 season Gălățanu joined Dinamo București, of which national team colleagues Dolniceanu and Iulian Teodosiu are also members. With Dinamo he took part to the European Champion Clubs' Cup in Gödöllő. Dinamo defeated French club Section Paloise in the final to earn the gold medal. At the 2014 European Championships in Strasbourg Gălățanu was defeated in the first round by four-time Olympic medallist Aldo Montano. In the team event, Romania was defeated by Belarus in the quarter-finals and finished 5th. At the 2014 World Championships Gălățanu failed to qualify for the main table of 64 after losing to Benjamin Igoe of the United States. In the team event, Romania ceded to reigning Olympic champions South Korea in the quarter-finals and finished 7th.
