= Men's team sabre at the 2016 World Fencing Championships =

2016 World Fencing Championships sports event

The Men's team sabre event of the 2016 World Fencing Championships was held from 25 to 27 April 2016.

== Medalists ==
Gold	Russia; Dmitriy Danilenko; Kamil Ibragimov; Nikolay Kovalev; Aleksey Yakimenko
Silver	Hungary; Tamás Decsi; Nikolász Iliász; András Szatmári; Áron Szilágyi
Bronze	Romania; Alin Badea; Ciprian Gălățanu; Tiberiu Dolniceanu; Iulian Teodosiu

== Results ==
=== Championship bracket ===
Round of 32
Japan	45
Canada	43
Great Britain	45
Chile	17
Brazil	26
Georgia	45
Hong Kong	36
Argentina	45

Round of 16
United States	45
Japan	24
Iran	45
France	41
Hungary	45
Spain	29
Great Britain	35
Germany	45
Russia	45
Georgia	37
Belarus	28
South Korea	45
Romania	45
China	36
Argentina	26
Italy	45

Quarterfinals
United States	40
Iran	45
Hungary	45
Germany	43
Russia	45
South Korea	41
Romania	45
Italy	43

Semifinals
Iran	43
Hungary	45
Russia	45
Romania	24

Final
Hungary	38
Russia	45
Third place
Iran	35
Romania	45

=== 5–8th place bracket ===
5–8th place semifinals
United States	43
Germany	45
South Korea	40
Italy	45

Fifth place
Germany	45
Italy	37
Seventh place
United States	39
South Korea	45

=== 9–16th place bracket ===
9–16th place quarterfinals
Japan	27
France	45
Spain	45
Great Britain	26
Georgia	41
Belarus	45
China	45
Argentina	18

9–12th place semifinals
France	35
Spain	45
Belarus	45
China	26

Ninth place
Spain	40
Belarus	45
Eleventh place
France	45
China	39

=== 13–16th place bracket ===
13–16th place semifinals
Japan	25
Great Britain	45
Georgia	44
Argentina	45

13th place
Great Britain	45
Argentina	38
15th place
Japan	39
Georgia	45

== Final ranking ==
Rank	Team
Gold medal	Russia
Silver medal	Hungary
Bronze medal	Romania
4	Iran
5	Germany
6	Italy
7	South Korea
8	United States
9	Belarus
10	Spain
11	France
12	China
13	Great Britain
14	Argentina
15	Georgia
16	Japan
17	Hong Kong
18	Canada
19	Brazil
20	Chile
