= Men's team sabre at the 2011 World Fencing Championships =

The men's team sabre event of the 2011 World Fencing Championships took place on October 14, 2011.

== Medalists ==
1st place, gold medalist(s)	Russia; Nikolay Kovalev; Veniamin Reshetnikov; Aleksey Yakimenko; Pavel Bykov
2nd place, silver medalist(s)	Belarus; Valery Pryiemka; Aliaksandr Buikevich; Dmitri Lapkes; Aliaksei Likhacheuski
3rd place, bronze medalist(s)	Italy; Diego Occhuizzi; Aldo Montano; Gianpiero Pastore; Luigi Tarantino

== Draw ==
=== Finals ===
Semifinals
Italy	43
Belarus	45
Germany	33
Russia	45

Final
Russia	45
Belarus	29
Third place
Germany	40
Italy	45

=== Top half ===
Round of 32
Italy
Bye
Hong Kong	45
Kazakhstan	42
France	45
Democratic Republic of the Congo	21
Colombia	21
United States	45
Belarus
Bye
Argentina	18
Canada	45
Spain	45
Brazil	41
Bye
Romania

Round of 16
Italy	45
Hong Kong	18
France	37
United States	45
Belarus	45
Canada	27
Spain	31
Romania	45

Quarterfinals
Italy	45
United States	42
Belarus	45
Romania	44

Semifinals
Italy	43
Belarus	45

=== Bottom half ===
Round of 32
Germany
Bye
Venezuela	45
Japan	37
Ukraine	45
Georgia	22
Ivory Coast	4
South Korea	45
China	45
Iraq	24
Australia	17
Hungary	45
Iran	45
Egypt	29
Bye
Russia

Round of 16
Germany	45
Venezuela	29
Ukraine	45
South Korea	35
China	32
Hungary	45
Iran	16
Russia	45

Quarterfinals
Germany	45
Ukraine	30
Hungary	33
Russia	45

Semifinals
Germany	33
Russia	45

=== Placement matches ===
==== 5–8th place ====
5–8th place semifinals
United States	41
Romania	45
Ukraine	44
Hungary	45

Fifth place
Romania	45
Hungary	40
Seventh place
United States	31
Ukraine	45

==== 9–12th place ====
9–16th place quarterfinals
Hong Kong	26
France	45
Canada	44
Spain	45
Venezuela	20
South Korea	45
China	45
Iran	28

9–12th place semifinals
France	45
Spain	26
South Korea	45
China	41

Ninth place
France	38
South Korea	45
11th place
Spain	45
China	41

==== 13–16th place ====
13–16th place semifinals
Hong Kong	41
Canada	45
Venezuela	42
Iran	45

13th place
Canada	45
Iran	39
15th place
Hong Kong	36
Venezuela	45
