= Men's team sabre at the 2013 World Fencing Championships =

The Men's team sabre event of the 2013 World Fencing Championships was held on August 10, 2013.

== Medalists ==
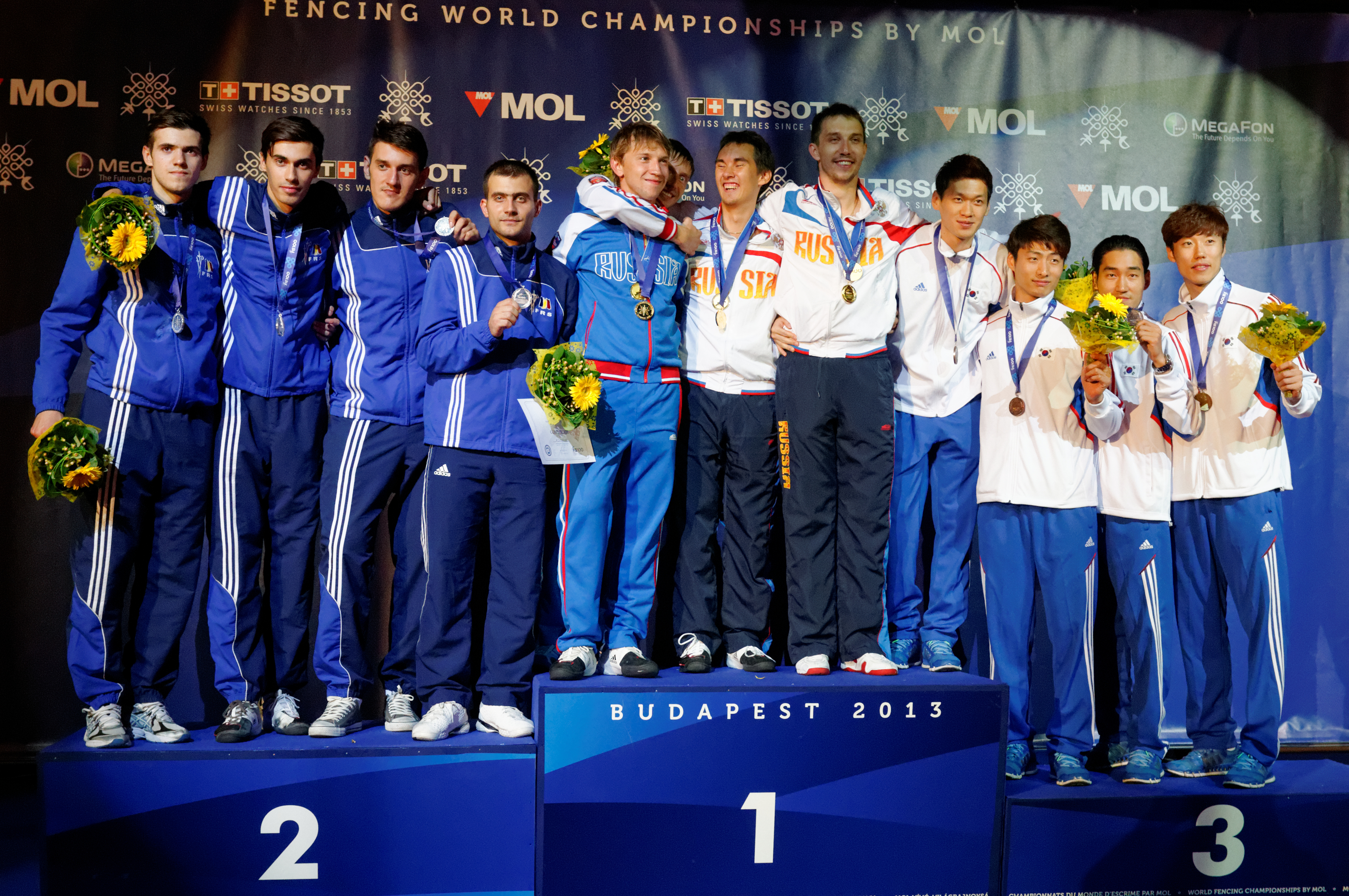
On the podium: from left to right, Romania, Russia, and Korea

| Gold | Russia; Kamil Ibragimov; Nikolay Kovalev; Veniamin Reshetnikov; Aleksey Yakimenko |
| Silver | Romania; Alin Badea; Tiberiu Dolniceanu; Ciprian Gălățanu; Iulian Teodosiu |
| Bronze | South Korea; Gu Bon-gil; Kim Jung-hwan; Oh Eun-seok; Won Jun-Ho |

== Draw ==
=== Finals ===
| Final |
| 1 | Romania | 38 |
| 2 | Russia | 45 |

| Third place |
| 1 | Belarus | 31 |
| 2 | South Korea | 45 |

=== Top half ===
Round of 32
Egypt | 43
Japan | 45
Belarus | 45
Colombia | 15
Mexico | 37
China | 45
Hungary | 45
Argentina | 24
Singapore | 28
France | 45
Poland | 45
Spain | 44
Australia | 15
Romania | 45

Round of 16
Italy | 45
Japan | 32
Belarus | 45
China | 26
Hungary | 45
France | 40
Poland | 37
Romania | 45

Quarterfinals
Italy | 43
Belarus | 45
Hungary | 44
Romania | 45

Semifinals
Belarus | 44
Romania | 45

=== Bottom half ===
Round of 32
Russia | 45
Israel | 21
Iran | 44
United Kingdom | 45
Canada | 45
Brazil | 36
Kuwait | 13
Germany | 45
United States | 45
Georgia | 33
Venezuela | 30
Ukraine | 45
Hong Kong | 45
Kazakhstan | 33
DR Congo
South Korea | w/o

Round of 16
Russia | 45
United Kingdom | 29
Canada | 26
Germany | 45
United States | 45
Ukraine | 41
Hong Kong | 25
South Korea | 45

Quarterfinals
Russia | 45
Germany | 43
United States | 33
South Korea | 45

Semifinals
Russia | 45
South Korea | 39

=== Placement rounds ===
==== 5–8th place ====
5–8th place semifinals
Italy | 45
Hungary | 41
Germany | 45
United States | 34

5th place
Italy | 40
Germany | 45
7th place
Hungary | 45
United States | 44

==== 9–16th place ====
9–16th place quarterfinals
Japan | 35
China | 45
France | 45
Poland | 24
United Kingdom | 43
Canada | 45
Ukraine | 45
Hong Kong | 30

9–13th place semifinals
China | 39
France | 45
Canada | 34
Ukraine | 45

9th place
France | 45
Ukraine | 40
11th place
China | 34
Canada | 45

==== 13–16th place ====
13–16th place semifinals
Japan | 30
Poland | 45
United Kingdom | 45
Hong Kong | 44

13th place
Poland | 45
United Kingdom | 41
15th place
Japan | 44
Hong Kong | 45

== Final classification ==
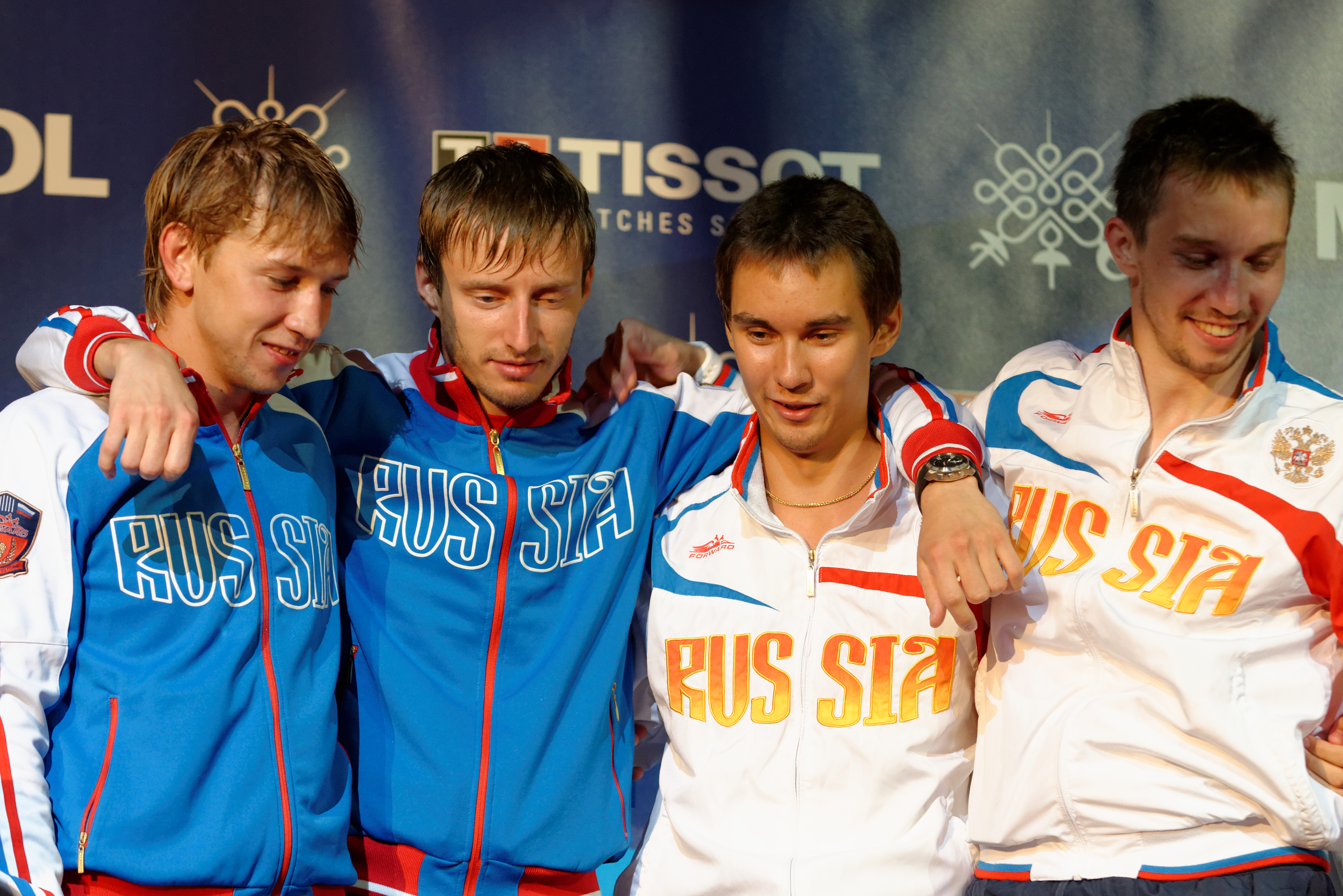
2013 World team champion Russia

| Rank | Nation |
|---|---|
| 1st place, gold medalist(s) | Russia |
| 2nd place, silver medalist(s) | Romania |
| 3rd place, bronze medalist(s) | South Korea |
| 4 | Belarus |
| 5 | Germany |
| 6 | Italy |
| 7 | Hungary |
| 8 | United States |
| 9 | France |
| 10 | Ukraine |
| 11 | Canada |
| 12 | China |
| 13 | Poland |
| 14 | United Kingdom |
| 15 | Hong Kong |
| 16 | Japan |
| 17 | Egypt |
| 18 | Kazakhstan |
| 19 | Iran |
| 20 | Spain |
| 21 | Singapore |
| 22 | Brazil |
| 23 | Venezuela |
| 24 | Colombia |
| 25 | Mexico |
| 26 | Georgia |
| 27 | Kuwait |
| 28 | Argentina |
| 29 | Australia |
| 30 | Israel |
| 31 | Democratic Republic of the Congo |
