= Kamil Ibragimov =

Russian fencer

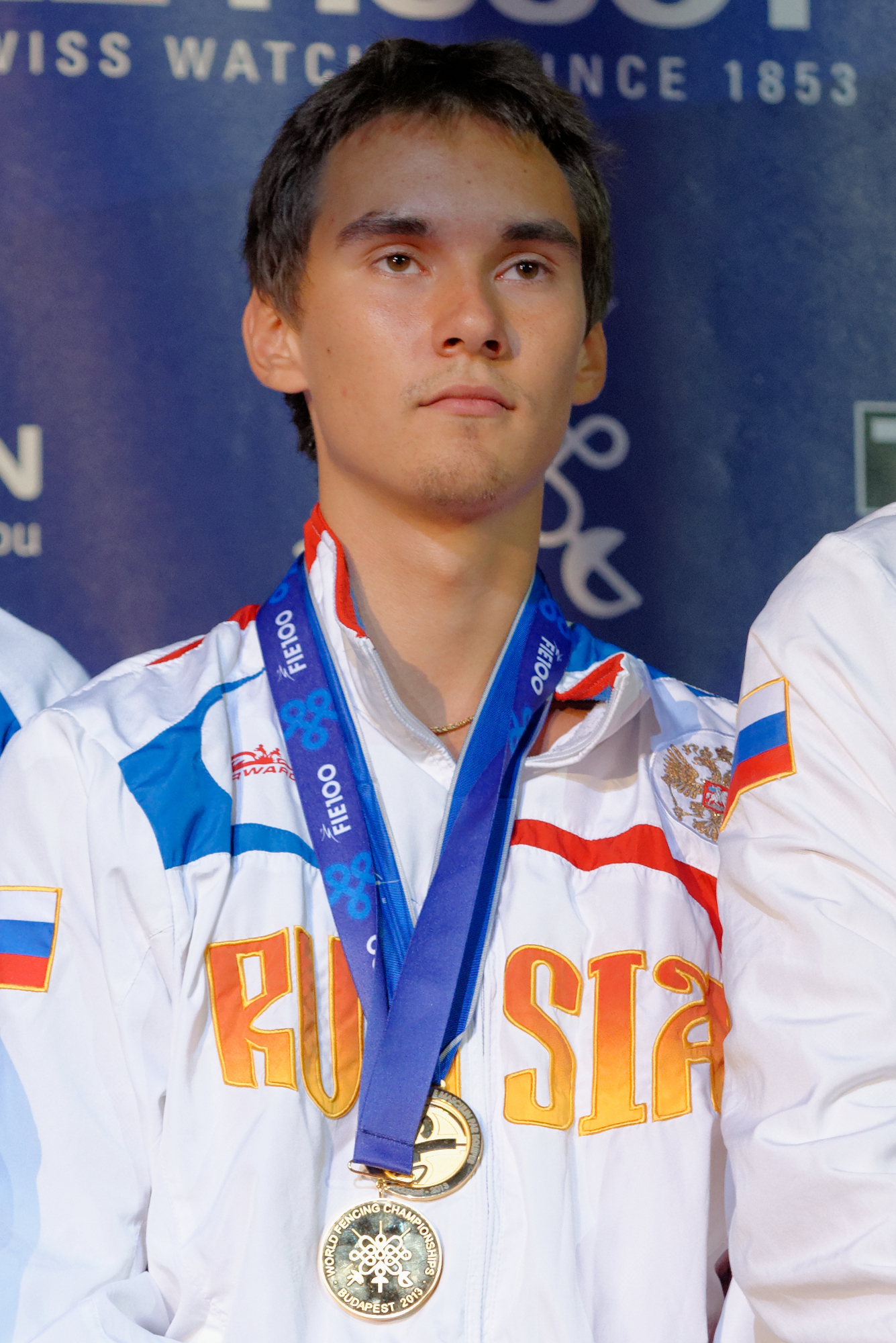
- Ibragimov at the 2013 World Fencing Championships

Personal information
- Full name: Kamil Anvarovich Ibragimov
- Nationality: (Russia) Russian
- Born: 13 August 1993 (age 33) Moscow, Russia
- Height: 1.77 m (5 ft 10 in)
- Weight: 69 kg (152 lb)

Fencing career
- Sport: Fencing
- Country: Russia
- Weapon: Sabre
- Hand: Right-handed
- National coach: Christian Bauer
- Club: CSKA Moscow (Central Sports Army Club) and MGFSO [RUS].
- Personal coach: Aleksandr Shirshov
- FIE ranking: current ranking
Medal record
World Championships
Gold medal – first place	2013 Budapest	Team sabre
Gold medal – first place	2016 Rio de Janeiro	Team sabre
Silver medal – second place	2015 Moscow	Team sabre
Bronze medal – third place	2017 Leipzig	Individual sabre
Bronze medal – third place	2018 Wuxi	Individual sabre
European Championships
Gold medal – first place	2016 Toruń	Team sabre
Gold medal – first place	2017 Tbilisi	Team sabre
Silver medal – second place	2014 Strasbourg	Team sabre
Silver medal – second place	2018 Novi Sad	Individual sabre
Silver medal – second place	2019 Düsseldorf	Individual sabre
Bronze medal – third place	2014 Strasbourg	Individual sabre
Bronze medal – third place	2016 Toruń	Individual sabre
Military World Games
Gold medal – first place	2019 Wuhan	Team sabre

Kamil Anvarovich Ibragimov (Russian: Камиль Анварович Ибрагимов; born 13 August 1993) is a Russian right-handed sabre fencer, two-time team European champion, and two-time team world champion.

== Personal life ==
Ibragimov is the son of foil fencers Anvar Ibragimov and Olga Velichko and is of Tatar and Russian origin. He began fencing at the age of seven under the guidance of 1992 Olympic champion Aleksandr Shirshov, who remains his personal coach.

== Career ==
Ibragimov is a Russian Armed Forces athlete, and his clubs are the Russian Central Sports Army Club and MGFSO.

Amongst seniors, he made his breakthrough during the 2012–13 season, when he climbed his first World Cup podium with a gold medal in the Glaive d'Asparoukh after defeating Romania's Tiberiu Dolniceanu in the final. That same year, he won the Junior World Championship in Poreč and the 2013 Summer Universiade in Kazan. At the World Championships in Budapest, he was eliminated in the second round. In the team event, where Ibragimov stood as reserve, Russia won the gold medal after prevailing over Romania in the final.

In the 2014 European Championships at Strasbourg, Ibragimov made his way to the semi-finals where he was stopped by team-mate Aleksey Yakimenko and came away with the bronze medal. In the team event, Russia met Italy in the final. Russia were defeated 44–45. A month after, in the World Championships at Kazan, Ibragimov was defeated in the second round. The team event was Ibragimov's first time as a full member of the side. Russia met Germany in the semi-finals. Selected to close the match instead of captain Nikolay Kovalev, Ibragimov could not prevent Germany from winning 45–40. They met Hungary in the small final, but were defeated once again and came away with no medal.

In the 2014–15 season Ibragimov won the Trofeo Luxardo in Padova after seeing off Ukraine's Andriy Yagodka in the final.

== Medal record ==
=== World Championship ===
Year	Location	Event	Position
2013	Budapest, Hungary	Team Men's Sabre	1st
2015	Moscow, Russia	Team Men's Sabre	2nd
2016	Rio de Janeiro, Brazil	Team Men's Sabre	1st
2017	Leipzig, Germany	Individual Men's Sabre	3rd
2018	Wuxi, China	Individual Men's Sabre	3rd

=== European Championship ===
Year	Location	Event	Position
2014	Strasbourg, France	Individual Men's Sabre	3rd
2014	Strasbourg, France	Team Men's Sabre	2nd
2016	Toruń, Poland	Individual Men's Sabre	3rd
2016	Toruń, Poland	Team Men's Sabre	1st
2017	(Georgia (country)) Tbilisi, Georgia	Team Men's Sabre	1st
2018	Novi Sad, Serbia	Individual Men's Sabre	2nd
2019	Düsseldorf, Germany	Individual Men's Sabre	2nd

=== Grand Prix ===
Date	Location	Event	Position
2013-01-19	Plovdiv, Bulgaria	Individual Men's Sabre	1st
2015-03-28	Seoul, South Korea	Individual Men's Sabre	3rd
2018-03-30	Seoul, South Korea	Individual Men's Sabre	3rd

=== World Cup ===
Date	Location	Event	Position
2015-01-30	Padua, Italy	Individual Men's Sabre	1st
2015-05-01	Madrid, Spain	Individual Men's Sabre	2nd
2015-10-30	Budapest, Hungary	Individual Men's Sabre	3rd
2016-01-29	Padua, Italy	Individual Men's Sabre	3rd
2016-02-19	Warsaw, Poland	Individual Men's Sabre	3rd
2017-11-03	Algiers, Algeria	Individual Men's Sabre	3rd
2022-01-15	(Georgia (country)) Tbilisi, Georgia	Individual Men's Sabre	2nd
