= Veniamin Reshetnikov =

Russian fencer

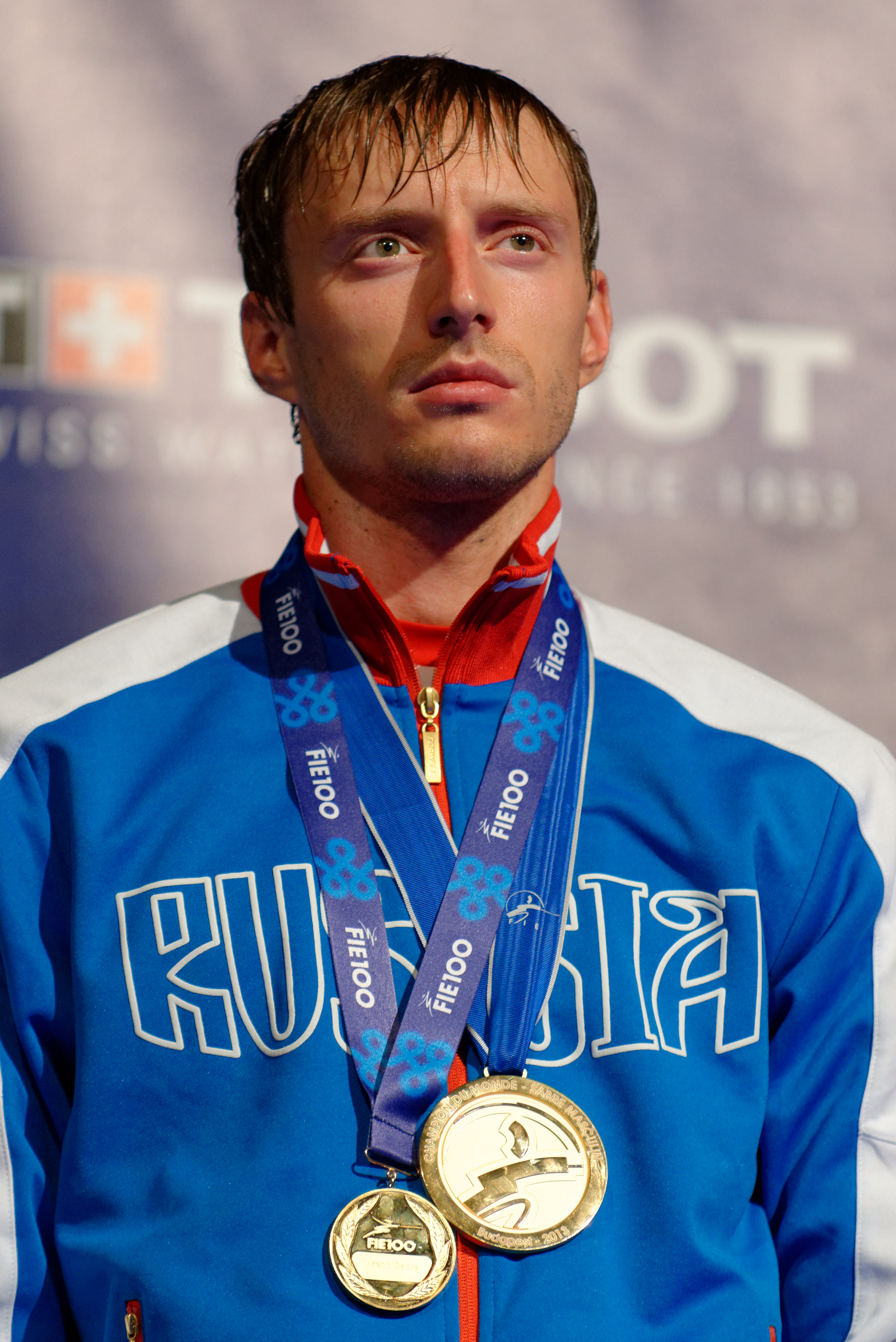
- Reshetnikov at the 2013 World Fencing Championships

Personal information
- Full name: Veniamin Sergeyevich Reshetnikov
- Nicknames: Venya, Reshet
- Nationality: (Russia) Russian
- Born: July 28, 1986 (age 40) Novosibirsk, Novosibirsk Oblast, RSFSR, USSR (now Russia)
- Home town: Novosibirsk
- Height: 1.81 m (5 ft 11 in)
- Weight: 75 kg (165 lb)

Fencing career
- Sport: Fencing
- Country: Russia
- Weapon: Sabre
- Hand: Left-handed
- National coach: Christian Bauer
- Club: Dynamo Novosibirsk
- Head coach: Boris Pisetsky
- FIE ranking: current ranking
Medal record
World Championships
Gold medal – first place	2010 Paris	Team sabre
Gold medal – first place	2011 Catania	Team sabre
Gold medal – first place	2013 Budapest	Individual sabre
Gold medal – first place	2013 Budapest	Team sabre
Silver medal – second place	2015 Moscow	Team sabre
Bronze medal – third place	2010 Paris	Individual sabre
European Championships
Gold medal – first place	2007 Ghent	Team sabre
Gold medal – first place	2009 Plovdiv	Individual sabre
Gold medal – first place	2012 Legnano	Team sabre
Gold medal – first place	2019 Düsseldorf	Individual sabre
Silver medal – second place	2014 Strasbourg	Individual sabre
Silver medal – second place	2014 Strasbourg	Team sabre
Bronze medal – third place	2011 Sheffield	Team sabre

Veniamin Sergeyevich Reshetnikov (Russian: Вениамин Сергеевич Решетников; born 28 July 1986) is a Russian left-handed sabre fencer.

Reshetnikov is a two-time team European champion, two-time individual European champion, three-time team world champion, and 2013 individual world champion. Reshetnikov competed in the 2012 London Olympic Games, where he finished 17th in the individual men's sabre event.

== Early life ==
Reshetnikov graduated from the Novosibirsk State Pedagogical University, then studied public administration at the Novosibirsk State Agrarian University.

== Career ==
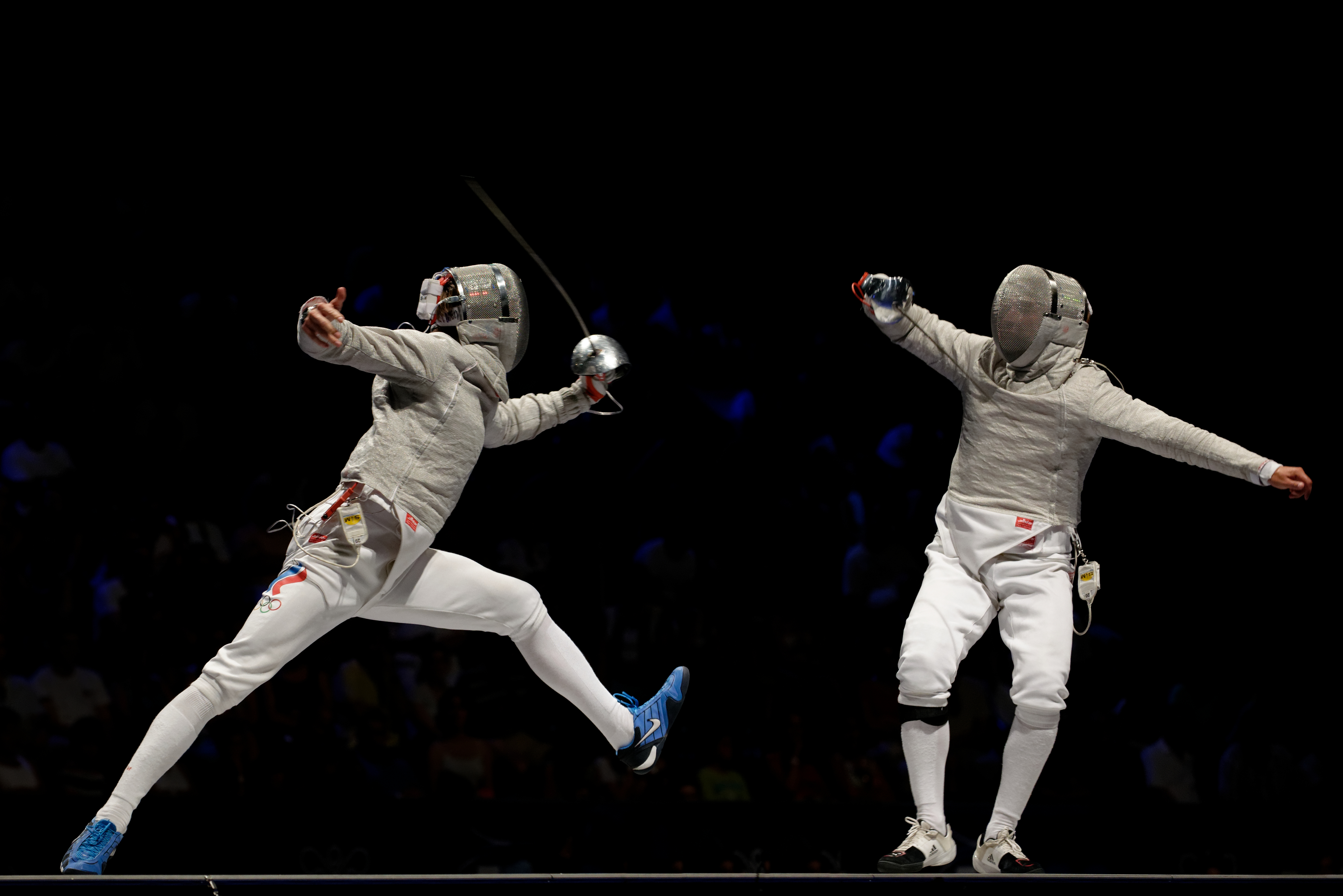
Reshetnikov (L) attacks Nikolay Kovalev in the final of the 2013 World Championships

In the 2005–06 season Reshetnikov joined the junior national team, where he became friends with Nikolay Kovalev. He won with them a team gold medal in the 2006 Junior World championships at Taebaek City. The year after, he joined the senior national team, which earned gold at the European Championships in Ghent. In 2009 he created a surprise at the European Championships in Plovdiv: ranked 61st before the competition, he won only two of his five bouts in pools and had to go through a qualification round. He then defeated Vincent Anstett, Rareș Dumitrescu, Aldo Montano, Dmitry Lapkes, Gianpiero Pastore, and finally Julien Pillet to win the gold medal.

In the 2009–10 season Reshetnikov climbed a World Cup podium for the first time with a gold medal in the Istanbul World Cup, followed by a silver medal in the Akropolis Grand Prix. At the European Championships in Leipzig, he was eliminated in the quarter-finals by Germany's Nicolas Limbach, who eventually won the silver medal. He fell against Limbach again in the semi-finals of the World Championships in Paris and came away with a bronze medal. In the team event, Russia defeated South Korea, then Romania, and met Italy in the final. Russia came back from an early 10–1 Italian lead to prevail 45–41 and take Russia's first World title since 2005.

The 2010–11 season was a dry spell for Reshetnikov, whose best individual result was a quarter-final loss 14–15 against Gu Bon-gil at the World Championships in Catania. With the team, he won a bronze medal at the European Championships in Sheffield and Russia kept their World title after beating Belarus 45–29 in the final.

In the 2011–12 season Reshetnikov took a silver medal in the Warsaw Grand Prix after being defeated in the final by teammate Aleksey Yakimenko. He was stopped in the first round by Ukraine's Dmytro Boiko in the European Championships in Legnano. In the team event, Russia defeated Ukraine and Italy to meet Romania in the final. Reshetnikov won each of his three bouts, contributing to his team's 45–42 victory.

At the 2012 Summer Olympics, he was defeated in the second round by Tim Morehouse of the United States. The team event proved equally disappointing as No.1 seed Russia was defeated by Romania in the semi-finals, then by Italy in the bronze medal match and went home with no medal.

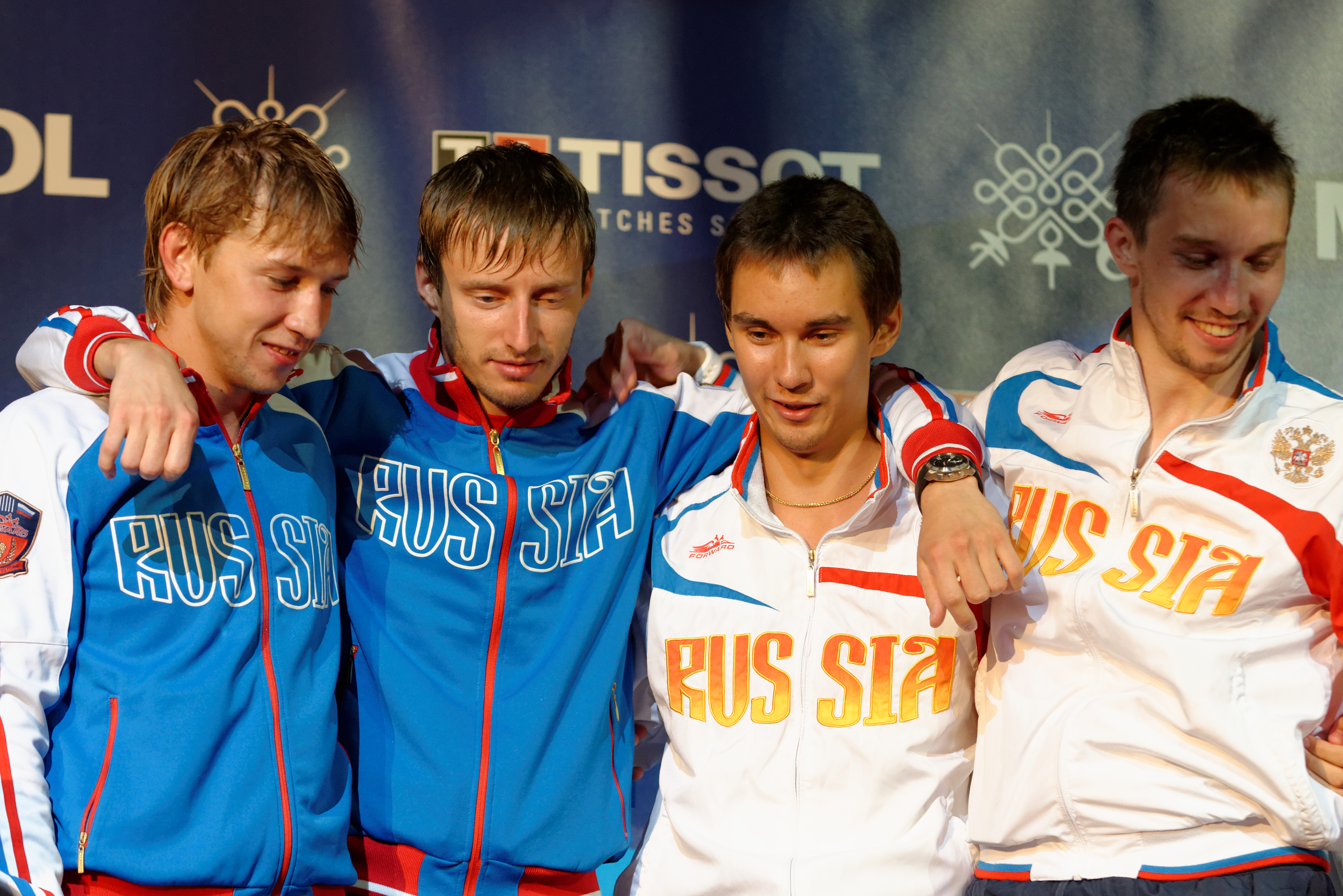
Team Russia on the 2013 Worlds podium (from L to R Kovalev, Reshetnikov, Ibragimov and Yakimenko)

In the 2012–13 season, Reshetnikov won two silver medals in the Madrid and Padova World Cups. He sustained a hand injury in the Chicago World Cup which had him miss the rest of the season. At the European Championships in Zagreb he was stopped in the quarter-finals by teammate Nikolay Kovalev. In the team event, Russia fell in the first round against Ukraine and finished second-to-last. Two weeks later, despite tonsillitis, Reshetnikov took part in the 2013 Summer Universiade at Kazan where he took a bronze medal after teammate Aleksey Yakimenko defeated him in the semi-finals. In the team event Russia overcame the United States, China, Korea, then Italy to earn the gold medal. At the World Championships in Budapest, No.8 seed Reshetnikov disposed of Germany's Max Hartung in the quarter-finals, then of Romania's Tiberiu Dolniceanu. He fenced teammate and friend Kovalev in the first all-Russian final in the major event since the Stanislav Pozdnyakov v Sergey Sharikov duel in the 1996 Summer Olympics. Kovalev took the lead at the end of the first period, but Reshetnikov came back to win the World title. In the team event, Russia made their way easily to the quarter-finals, where they defeated Germany, then South Korea. They fenced Romania in the final. Reshetnikov opened the match, but was defeated 1–5 by Romania captain Dolniceanu. He won 6–4 his next bout against the youngest Romanian, Iulian Teodosiu. Russia eventually prevailed 45–38, allowing Reshetnikov to win a second gold medal.

In the 2013–14 season, Reshetnikov climbed the podium in the Moscow and Athens World Cups. He was seeded No.11 after the pools stage in the European Championships and made his way to the final, where he was defeated 15–11 by teammate Aleksey Yakimenko. In the team event, No.1 seed Russia had a tight 45–44 over No.9 seed Ukraine in the quarter-finals, then prevailed 45–41 over Belarus to meet Italy in the final. After a very tight match, Reshetnikov was poised for the win on 43–44 in the last relay, but Italy's Luigi Samele struck two hits in a row to snatch the gold medal from Russia.

In the World Championships in Kazan, Reshetnikov suffered front leg and back injuries and was defeated in the second round by Korea's Won Woo-young and could not defend his title. In the team event, defending champion Russia were defeated in the semi-finals by Germany. They fenced Hungary for the bronze medal, but were defeated and came away with no medal.

== Medal record ==
=== World Championship ===
Year	Location	Event	Position
2010	Paris, France	Team Men's Sabre	1st
2010	Paris, France	Individual Men's Sabre	3rd
2011	Catania, Italy	Team Men's Sabre	1st
2013	Budapest, Hungary	Individual Men's Sabre	1st
2013	Budapest, Hungary	Team Men's Sabre	1st
2015	Moscow, Russia	Individual Men's Sabre	2nd

=== European Championship ===
Year	Location	Event	Position
2007	Ghent, Belgium	Team Men's Sabre	1st
2009	Plovdiv, Bulgaria	Individual Men's Sabre	1st
2011	Sheffield, United Kingdom	Team Men's Sabre	3rd
2012	Legnano, Italy	Team Men's Sabre	1st
2014	Strasbourg, France	Individual Men's Sabre	2nd
2014	Strasbourg, France	Team Men's Sabre	2nd
2019	Düsseldorf, Germany	Individual Men's Sabre	1st

=== Grand Prix ===
Date	Location	Event	Position
2006-07-14	Tehran, Iran	Individual Men's Sabre	3rd
2012-06-02	Warsaw, Poland	Individual Men's Sabre	2nd

=== World Cup ===
Date	Location	Event	Position
2007-03-16	Tunis, Tunisia	Individual Men's Sabre	3rd
2010-01-16	Istanbul, Turkey	Individual Men's Sabre	1st
2010-01-30	Athens, Greece	Individual Men's Sabre	2nd
2013-02-08	Madrid, Spain	Individual Men's Sabre	2nd
2013-02-15	Padua, Italy	Individual Men's Sabre	2nd
2014-03-21	Moscow, Russia	Individual Men's Sabre	3rd
2014-04-25	Athens, Greece	Individual Men's Sabre	3rd
2017-11-03	Algier, Algeria	Individual Men's Sabre	3rd
2017-12-01	Győr, Hungary	Individual Men's Sabre	2nd
2018-05-18	Madrid, Spain	Individual Men's Sabre	2nd
2020-03-06	Luxembourg	Individual Men's Sabre	3rd
