= Men's sabre at the 2010 World Fencing Championships =

The Men's sabre event took place on November 6, 2010 at the Grand Palais in Paris.

== Sabre individual ==
Position	Name	Country
1.	Won Woo-young	South Korea
2.	Nicolas Limbach	Germany
3.	Cosmin Hănceanu	Romania
3.	Veniamin Reshetnikov	Russia
5.	Luigi Tarantino	Italy
6.	Áron Szilágyi	Hungary
7.	Jaime Martí	Spain
8.	Aleksey Yakimenko	Russia

Quarter-finals
(Russia) Aleksey Yakimenko	13
(Romania) Cosmin Hănceanu	15
(Italy) Luigi Tarantino	13
(South Korea) Won Woo-young	15
(Russia) Veniamin Reshetnikov	15
(Spain) Jaime Martí	7
(Hungary) Áron Szilágyi	7
(Germany) Nicolas Limbach	15

Semi-finals
(Romania) Cosmin Hănceanu	10
(South Korea) Won Woo-young	15
(Russia) Veniamin Reshetnikov	10
(Germany) Nicolas Limbach	15

Final
(South Korea) Won Woo-young	15
(Germany) Nicolas Limbach	9
