= 2016 World Fencing Championships =

International fencing competition

- Dates: 25–27 April
- Host city: Rio de Janeiro, Brazil
- Venue: Carioca Arena 3
- Events: 2

The 2016 World Fencing Championships were held at the Carioca Arena 3 in Rio de Janeiro, Brazil from 25 to 27 April 2016. Only two disciplines that are not in the 2016 Olympic program were held.

== Medal summary ==
=== Medal table ===
| Rank | Nation | Gold | Silver | Bronze | Total |
|---|---|---|---|---|---|
| 1 | Russia (RUS) | 2 | 0 | 0 | 2 |
| 2 | Hungary (HUN) | 0 | 1 | 0 | 1 |
| 2 | Italy (ITA) | 0 | 1 | 0 | 1 |
| 4 | France (FRA) | 0 | 0 | 1 | 1 |
| 4 | Romania (ROU) | 0 | 0 | 1 | 1 |
| Totals (5 entries) | | 2 | 2 | 2 | 6 |

=== Events ===
| Event | Gold | Silver | Bronze |
|---|---|---|---|
| Men's team sabre | Russia; Dmitriy Danilenko; Kamil Ibragimov; Nikolay Kovalev; Aleksey Yakimenko | Hungary; Tamás Decsi; Nikolász Iliász; András Szatmári; Áron Szilágyi | Romania; Alin Badea; Ciprian Gălățanu; Tiberiu Dolniceanu; Iulian Teodosiu |
| Women's team foil | Russia; Inna Deriglazova; Larisa Korobeynikova; Aida Shanayeva; Adelina Zagidullina | Italy; Martina Batini; Elisa Di Francisca; Arianna Errigo; Valentina Vezzali | France; Gaëlle Gebet; Astrid Guyart; Pauline Ranvier; Ysaora Thibus |
