= Alin Badea =

Romanian sabre fencer

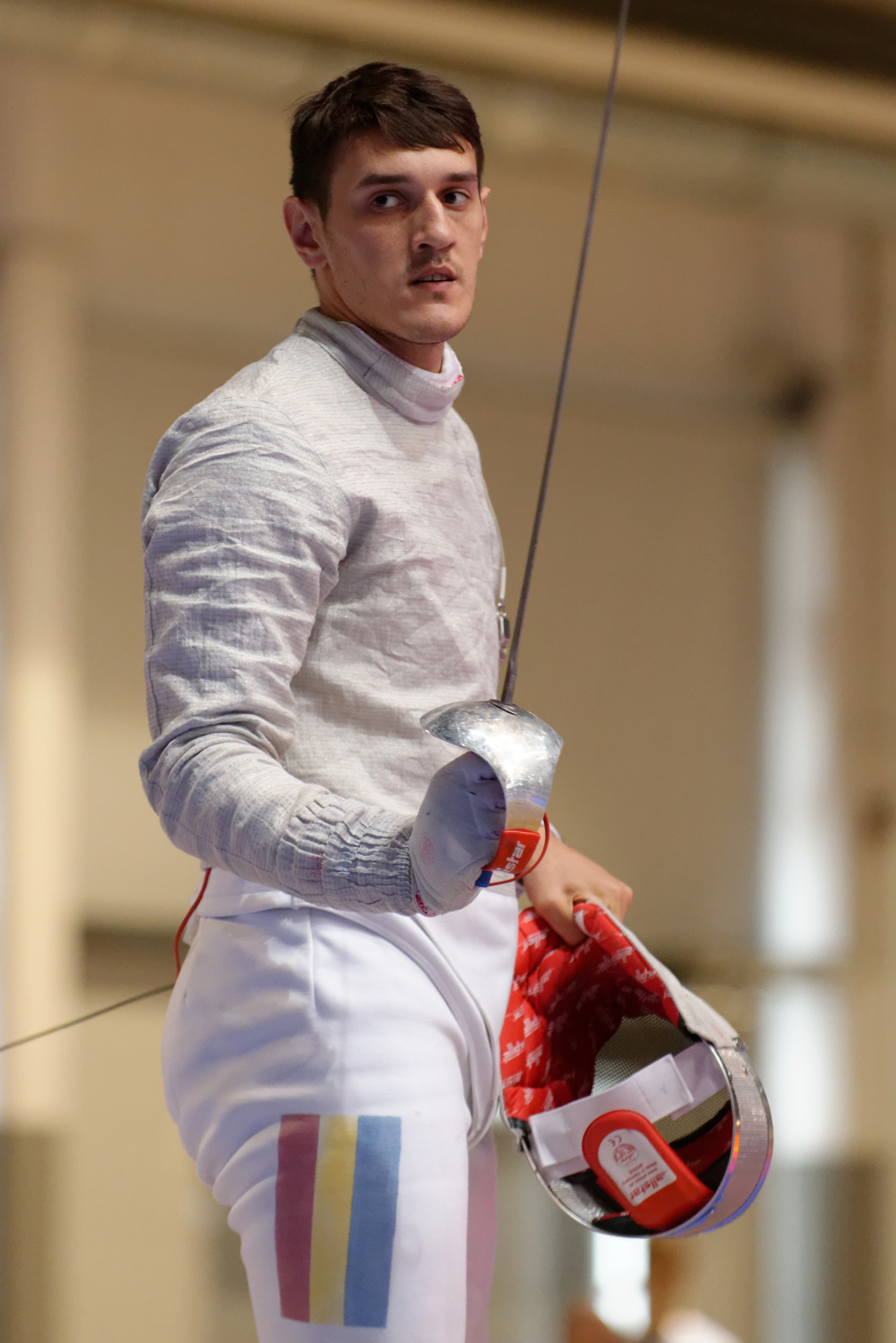
- Badea at the 2013 World Fencing Championships

Personal information
- Nickname: Bădie
- Nationality: Romanian
- Born: 1 June 1988 (age 38) Slobozia, Romania
- Height: 1.98 m (6 ft 6 in)

Fencing career
- Sport: Fencing
- Country: Romania
- Weapon: Sabre
- Hand: Right-handed
- National coach: Mihai Covaliu
- Club: CSA Steaua
- Former coach: Marin Mihăiță
- FIE ranking: current ranking
Medal record
World Championships
Silver medal – second place	2013 Budapest	Team
Bronze medal – third place	2016 Rio de Janeiro	Team
European Games
Silver medal – second place	2015 Baku	Team
European Championships
Bronze medal – third place	2016 Toruń	Team

Alin Badea (born 1 June 1988) is a Romanian sabre fencer, who won the team silver medal in the 2013 World championships.

== Biography ==
Badea began fencing at age 10 at his local club, CS Slobozia, under coach Marin Mihăiță. In 2008 he transferred to CSA Steaua in Bucharest.

Badea joined Romania's national team after the 2012 Summer Olympics and the retirement of three team members. With Tiberiu Dolniceanu as captain, Romania won a bronze medal in Madrid, their first World Cup tournament with the new team. For his first participation in World Championships, Badea made it to the table of 16, defeating world champion Aleksey Yakimenko along the way, before being stopped by Hungary's András Szatmári. In the team event, Badea proved instrumental in Romania's success. He entered the last relay in the quarter-final against host Hungary on 40–44 for the opposition and gave 2012 Olympic Champion Áron Szilágyi five hits in a row to win the match. Badea also fenced the last relay in the quarter-final against Belarus and gave the decisive hit again. Romania met Russia in the final. Distanced after the third relay, they were defeated 45–38 and ended up with a silver medal.

In the 2013–14 season Badea was stopped in the second round of the European Championships by Russia's Kamil Ibragimov, who eventually won a bronze medal. In the team event, team captain Dolniceanu and Badea got injured and Romania ended up No.5. At the World Championships, Badea reached the table of 16, where he was overcome by Korea's Gu Bon-gil. In the team event, Romania were defeated in the quarter-finals by South Korea and finished No.7. Badea ranked No.28 at the end of the season, a career best.

At the beginning of the 2014–15 season Badea pulled off a surprise win against Dolniceanu to win the Romanian national championship.
