= Aleksey Yakimenko =

Russian fencer

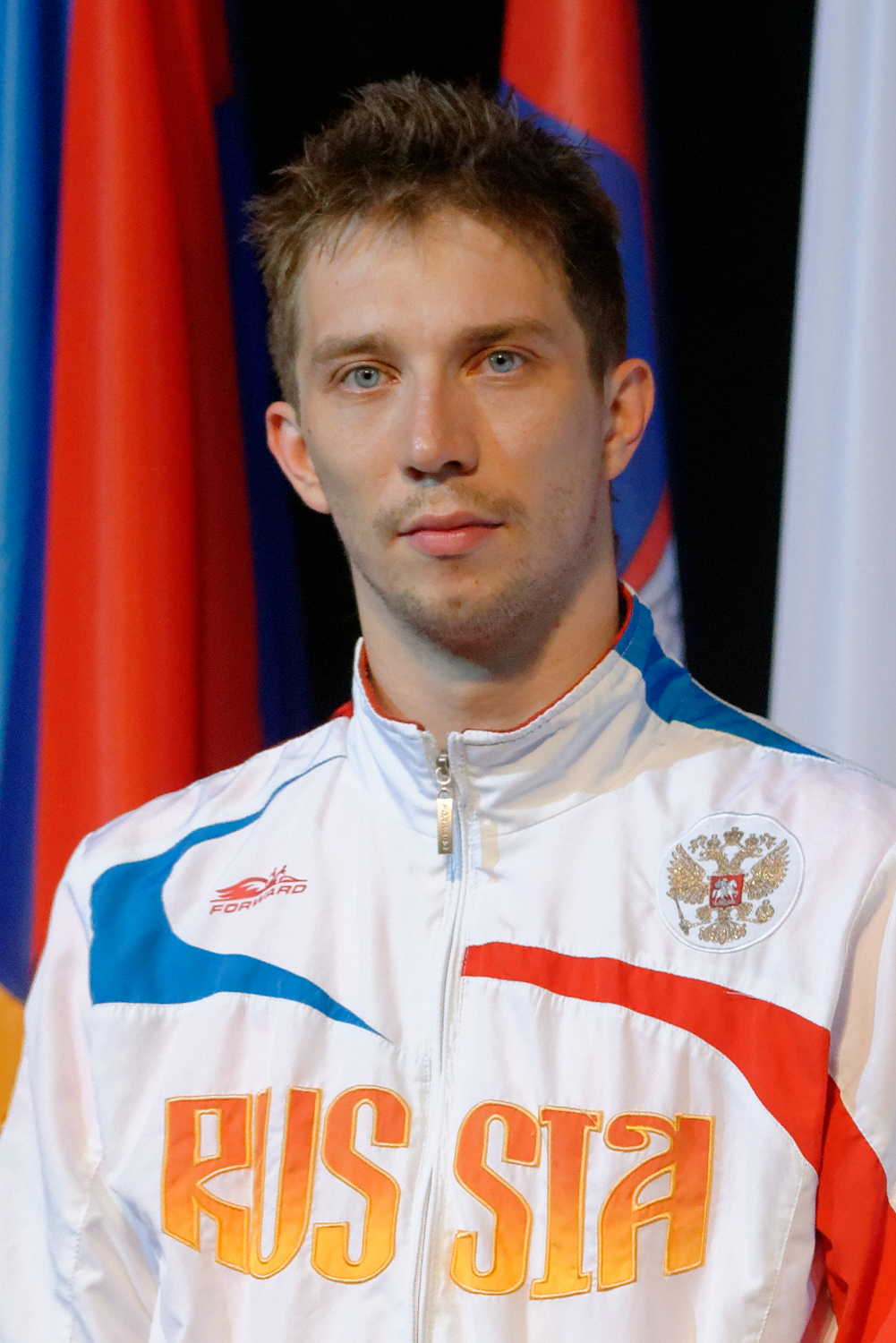
- Yakimenko at the 2014 European Fencing Championships

Personal information
- Full name: Aleksey Andreyevich Yakimenko
- Nickname: Liosha (Russian: Лёша)
- Nationality: Russian
- Born: 31 October 1983 (age 42) Barnaul, Altai Krai, Russian SFSR, USSR
- Home town: Moscow
- Height: 1.84 m (6 ft 0 in)
- Weight: 78 kg (172 lb)

Fencing career
- Sport: Fencing
- Weapon: Sabre
- Hand: left-handed
- National coach: Christian Bauer
- Club: Dynamo-MGFSO Olympus Moscow
- FIE ranking: current ranking
Medal record
Men's fencing
Representing Russia
Event	1st	2nd	3rd
Olympic Games	0	0	1
World Championships	8	1	3
European Championships	11	5	4
Olympic Games
Bronze medal – third place	2004 Athens	Team sabre
World Championships
Gold medal – first place	2002 Lisbon	Team sabre
Gold medal – first place	2003 Havana	Team sabre
Gold medal – first place	2005 Leipzig	Team sabre
Gold medal – first place	2010 Paris	Team sabre
Gold medal – first place	2011 Catania	Team sabre
Gold medal – first place	2013 Budapest	Team sabre
Gold medal – first place	2015 Moscow	Individual sabre
Gold medal – first place	2016 Rio de Janeiro	Team sabre
Silver medal – second place	2015 Moscow	Team sabre
Bronze medal – third place	2005 Leipzig	Individual sabre
Bronze medal – third place	2006 Turin	Team sabre
Bronze medal – third place	2014 Kazan	Individual sabre
European Championships
Gold medal – first place	2003 Bourges	Team sabre
Gold medal – first place	2004 Copenhagen	Team sabre
Gold medal – first place	2005 Zalaegerszeg	Team sabre
Gold medal – first place	2006 İzmir	Individual sabre
Gold medal – first place	2007 Ghent	Team sabre
Gold medal – first place	2008 Kyiv	Team sabre
Gold medal – first place	2010 Leipzig	Individual sabre
Gold medal – first place	2011 Sheffield	Individual sabre
Gold medal – first place	2012 Legnano	Individual sabre
Gold medal – first place	2012 Legnano	Team sabre
Gold medal – first place	2014 Strasbourg	Individual sabre
Gold medal – first place	2016 Toruń	Team sabre
Gold medal – first place	2017 Tbilisi	Team sabre
Silver medal – second place	2003 Bourges	Individual sabre
Silver medal – second place	2007 Ghent	Individual sabre
Silver medal – second place	2008 Kyiv	Individual sabre
Silver medal – second place	2013 Zagreb	Individual sabre
Silver medal – second place	2014 Strasbourg	Team sabre
Bronze medal – third place	2004 Copenhagen	Individual sabre
Bronze medal – third place	2006 İzmir	Team sabre
Bronze medal – third place	2011 Sheffield	Team sabre
Bronze medal – third place	2016 Toruń	Individual sabre

Aleksey Andreyevich Yakimenko (Russian: Алексей Андреевич Якименко; born 31 October 1983) is a Russian sabre fencer, eight-time team world champion (2002, 2003, 2005, 2010, 2011, 2013, 2015, 2016), eleven-time European champion (team and individual), and team bronze medallist in the 2004 Summer Olympics. He won the Fencing World Cup series three times (2004–05, 2006–07, 2010–11), with fifteen titles to his name, and earned five gold medals in the Universiade.

== Career ==
Yakimenko started fencing at the age of 7 in his hometown Barnaul under coach Aleksey Fitsev, a friend of his father's. He also practiced football and athletics, but fencing soon had his preference. Within two months of training he became champion of Altai Krai for his age group. At the age of 13 he moved to Moscow to train at MGFSO under national coach Aleksandr Filatov. In 2002 he won the silver medal and the team gold medal at the European Junior Championships in Conegliano and became double Junior World champion in Antalya. He was noted for his "dazzling technique, sparkling physique and excellent coordination".

Yakimenko's debut senior competition was the team event of the 2002 World Championships in Lisbon, where he won a gold medal together with Sergey Sharikov, Stanislav Pozdnyakov and Aleksey Frosin. He claimed his first individual medal at the 2003 European Championships in Bourges: his winning streak was interrupted only in the final by his captain, four-time Olympic champion Pozdnyakov. He came away with a silver medal, to which a team gold medal was added a few days later. He was defeated in the second round of the World Championships, but Russia retained his World title.

In the 2003–04 season Yakimenko climbed his first World Cup podium with a gold medal in Bonn, followed a few months later by a second place in the Nancy Grand Prix. He made his Olympic début in the team event of the 2004 Summer Olympics in Athens along with Sharikov, Pozdnyakov, and Aleksey Dyachenko. Russia lost against Italy in the semi-final, but narrowly prevailed over the United States to earn the bronze medal.

=== 2004–2008 ===
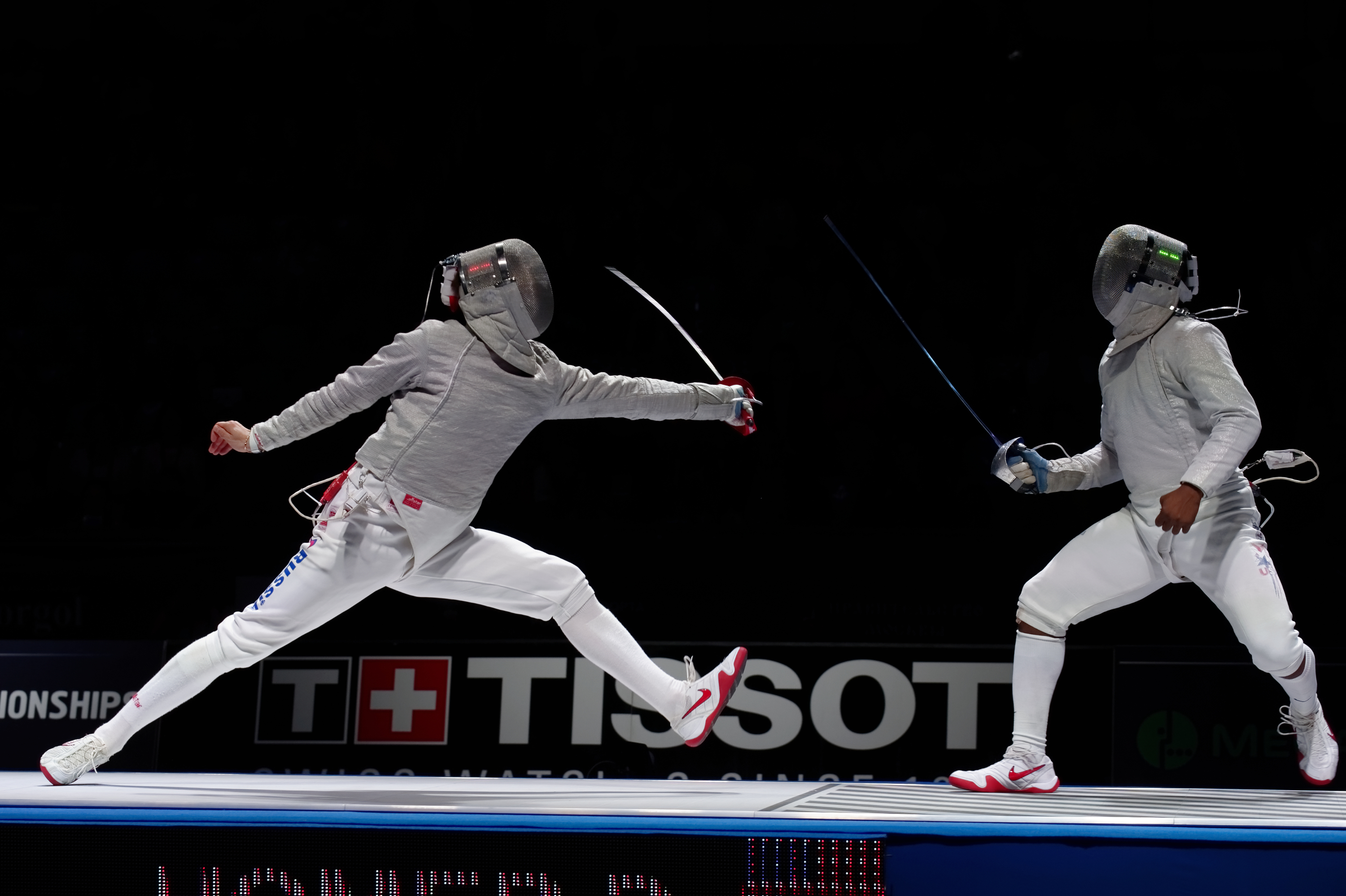
Yakimenko (L) attacks Daryl Homer in the final of the 2015 World Championships

The 2004–05 season saw Yakimenko win four World Cup events in Budapest, Moscow, Warsaw, and Thiès. He was stopped in the second round at the 2005 European Championships in Zalaegerszeg, like all his teammates. They took they revenge by winning the team event after overcoming Poland in the final. At the World Championships in Leipzig Yakimenko claimed his first individual World medal, a bronze, after being stopped in the semi-finals by Pozdnyakov. In the team event, Pozdnyakov's contribution allowed Russia to edge out Italy in the final and Yakimenko took his third team World title. With 280 points he became the second Russian after Pozdnyakov to win the World Cup in men's sabre. He also won the individual and team events at the 2005 Summer Universiade in Belgrade.

In the 2005–06 season Yakimenko won the Budapest, Moscow, and Santiago World Cups. At the 2006 European Championships in İzmir he edged past Romania's Florin Zalomir in the semi-finals, then defeated Ukraine's Volodymyr Lukashenko to earn his first European individual title. In the team event Yakimenko was trusted to close the matches, a role Pozdnyakov had fulfilled for ten years. Another change was the line-up of young Nikolay Kovalev. Russia were narrowly beaten by Romania in the semi-finals, but prevailed over Belarus to win the bronze medal. In the World Championships Yakimenko was defeated in the first round by Belarus' Aliaksandr Buikevich. Russia's director of fencing Sergey Kolganov attributed this below-par performance to overtraining and mental exhaustion after a long season. Yakimenko finished the season No.4.

Yakimenko climbed four World Cup podiums in the 2006–07 season, including victories in Tunis and Madrid. At the 2007 European Championships in Ghent, he prevailed over Pozdnyakov in the semi-finals, but he was defeated in the final by an unexpected Jorge Pina from Spain and was relegated to the silver medal. Pozdnyakov later commented that Yakimenko had underestimated the Spaniard. In the team event Yakimenko became the second most senior fencer of the team as national coach Boris Pisetsky brought young Veniamin Reshetnikov in the line-up. After a strong beginning in the semi-finals Russia were surprised by Ukraine's comeback. Yakimenko entered the piste on 31–40 and managed 14–4 in his last bout to get his team to the final, where Russia crushed Belarus 45–30, allowing him to claim his 5th European title in a row. Yakimenko earned his second gold medal in the 2007 Summer Universiade in Bangkok, as well as a bronze medal in the team event. In the World Championships at home in Saint-Petersburg, No.1 Yakimenko was defeated by Ukraine's Lukashenko, to whom he had never lost before. In the team event Russia were defeated by Hungary by a single hit in the first round and finished 5th. Yakimenko finished the season World No.1 for the second time of his career.

In the 2007–08 season Yakimenko earned two World Cup medals in Moscow and Warsaw. At the 2008 European Championships in Kyiv he disposed of Olympic champion Mihai Covaliu in the semi-final and met in the final Belarus' Buikevich, who had stopped him in the first round of the 2006 Worlds. Yakimenko was defeated again and came away with the silver medal. In the team event Russia met France in the final. The match was much less close than previous encounters and Russia won 45–29 to give Yakimenko his 6th team European title in a row.

Yakimenko took part in his second Olympics in Beijing. A favourite for the men's sabre event, he was defeated in the first round by his bête noire Aliaksandr Buikevich. His teammates did not fare any better. In the team event, No.3 seed Russia disposed of China in the quarter-final, then met the United States. After a difficult beginning by Russia, Yakimenko gave his team a 5-hit lead. Chosen to close the match, Pozdnyakov could not prevent Keeth Smart from closing the gap. Russia were finally defeated on 44–45 after what they considered as a refereeing mistake. They fenced Italy for the bronze medal. Again, Yakimenko gave his team the lead after a good Italian start. Despite a 44–42 position Pozdnyakov was overcome by Aldo Montano and Russia went home with no medal. Yakimenko finished the season No.16.

=== 2008–2012 ===
In the 2008–09 season Yakimenko began to work with new coach Christian Bauer, brought from China to replace Boris Pisetsky after the Beijing failure. Yakimenko also assumed the leadership of the team following Pozdnyakov's post-Olympic retirement. He earned two World Cup medals: a gold in Moscow and a silver in Dallas. In early July he took part in the 2009 Summer Universiade in Belgrade, but tore his Achilles tendon during his quarter-final against China's Zhong Man. He underwent an operation in Belgrade, then another in Russia, and stayed away from competition for several months.

Yakimenko resumed fencing for the Russian national championships in December 2009. He won the individual event, but created a scandal in the team event. During his team's semi-finals against Novosibirsk, he threw his mask on the piste out of frustration and received a black card. The Russian Fencing Federation suspended him for two months, effectively barring him from the first two stages of the World Cup.

Upon his return Yakimenko took a quarter-final placing in the Plovdiv Grand Prix, followed in May by a bronze medal in Madrid. At the European Championships in Leipzig he defeated France's Boladé Apithy in the semi-finals, then Germany's Nicolas Limbach to win his second European gold medal. In the team event, Russia ceded 45–44 to Ukraine in the semi-finals, then lost to Germany to come away with no medal. At the World Championships in Paris, Yakimenko was bested in the quarter-finals by Romania's Cosmin Hănceanu. In the team event, Russia beat Romania in the semi-final and overcame Italy to win the gold medal. Yakimenko dedicated to coach Christian Bauer the victory, Russia's 100th medal in an international fencing competition. He finished the season No.8.

In the 2010–11 season Yakimenko took a medal in six out of seven World Cup events he attended, including two victories in Madrid, Warsaw, and New York. At the European Championships in Sheffield, he edged out Nicolas Limbach in the quarter-finals, then largely prevailed over Max Hartung to meet Boladé Apithy in the final. After an early 8–5 lead by Yakimenko, Apithy struck eight hits in a row. Yakimenko managed to break the Frenchman's attack and eventually vanquished 15–14 to grab his third European title. In the team event, the Germans took their revenge by beating Russia 45–35 in the semi-final. Russia then bested Romania to take the bronze medal. No.1 in world rankings, Yakimenko came to Catania for the 2011 World Fencing Championships as a favourite. After two easy first rounds he was beaten 15–14 by Dmitri Lapkes of Belarus. In the team event, Russia dominated the competition and took home their second gold medal in a row. Yakimenko finished the season No.1 for the third time of his career.

The 2010–11 season brought him five podiums out of seven World Cup events, including a victory in Warsaw. He met small resistance in the individual event in claimed his third European title in a row. In the team event, Russia cruised to the final then prevailed 45–42 over Romania to allow Yakimenko a gold double. Widely considered the favourite in the 2012 Summer Olympics, he was defeated by a single hit in the second round by Daryl Homer of the United States. The team event proved equally disappointing as top seed Russia were eliminated in the semi-finals by Romania, then lost again to Italy and came home with no medal. “You can be in great shape and lose” commented Yakimenko, explaining that he had failed to cope with the pressure.

=== After the London Games ===
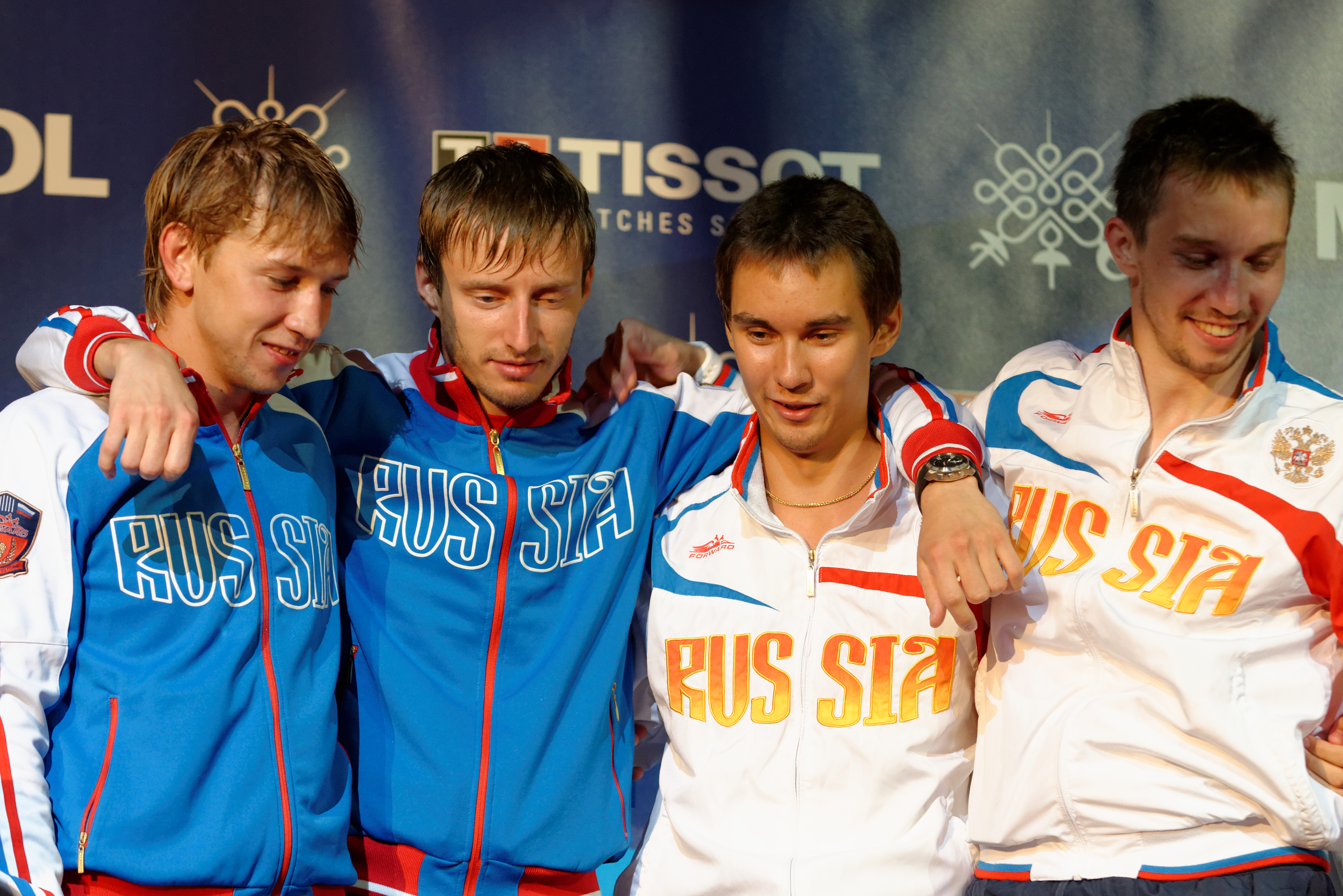
Yakimenko (R) with teammates at the 2013 World Championships

Yakimenko considered ending his career after the London fiasco and took a holiday in California to forget fencing and avoid the negative comments at home. During his stay in the United States he was deeply moved by a blog article from twice-Olympic champion Mariel Zagunis, explaining that she had received a lot of support despite her disappointing 4th place in London. The extension of national coach Christian Bauer's contract provided an anchor for him. Bauer's first decision was to rest Yakimenko from competition until May 2013, so he could recover mentally. A focus on his sport management studies at the Russian State University of Physical Education, Sport, Youth and Tourism also helped Yakimenko get past the Olympic disappointment.

A quarter-final in the 2013 Moscow World Cup was a good sign for the new season, but a sprained ankle during the Akropolis Cup in Athens caused him to miss the most of it. He was not fully recovered for the European Championships in Zagreb, but he managed to reach the final despite a difficult bout in the quarters against Italy's Diego Occhiuzzi. Defeated by Romania's Tiberiu Dolniceanu, he came away with a silver medal. In the team event, top seed Russia, further handicapped by Nikolay Kovalev's knee injury, suffered a shock defeat to Ukraine in the quarter-finals and finished 7th. Yakimenko later explained that the newly formed team was still in its running-in period and identified Andriy Yagodka's long arm as the main cause of their problems. He chose not to attend the 2013 Summer Universiade to preserve his form for the World Championships in Budapest. His ambitions were however cut short in the second round by Romania's Alin Badea. In the team event Russia prevailed over reigning Olympic champion South Korea, then defeated Romania to take the gold medal. Yakimenko finished the season No.16, his worst ranking since 2003–04, and was not selected for the 2013 World Combat Games in St-Petersburg.

The beginning of the 2013–14 season was difficult for Yakimenko: having dropped down to the No.17 spot, he no longer benefited from the Top-16 exemption and had to go through the qualifications phase in each World Cup competition. He bounced back in April with a bronze medal in Athens, followed by two bronzes in Chicago and Warsaw. In early June he was affected by the death of David Tyshler, one of Russia's greatest saberers and his personal supervisor at university. A few days later at the European Championships in Strasbourg, he defeated teammates Kamil Ibragimov and Veniamin Reshetnikov respectively in the semi-finals and in the final, to claim his fifth European individual title and his eleventh European medal. In the team event, Russia defeated Ukraine, then Belarus to meet Italy in the final. After a tight match Italy eventually prevailed 45–44 and Russia were relegated to a silver medal. At the World Championships in Kazan, Yakimenko edged out Korea's Won Woo-young in the quarter-finals, but ceded to the latter teammate's Gu Bon-gil in the semi-finals. He came away with a bronze medal, his second individual World podium only. He declared himself very pleased with this result and dedicated his medal to his fiancée. The team event however fell short of expectations: top-seed Russia were overcome in the semi-finals by Germany, who eventually won the gold medal. Very upset with this defeat, Russia failed to regroup for the bronze medal match and lost 45–43 against Hungary, coming home with no medal.

Yakimenko began the 2014–15 season with a bronze medal at the Budapest World Cup, after a defeat in the semifinals to Gu Bon-gil.
