= Tiberiu Dolniceanu =

Romanian fencer (born 1988)

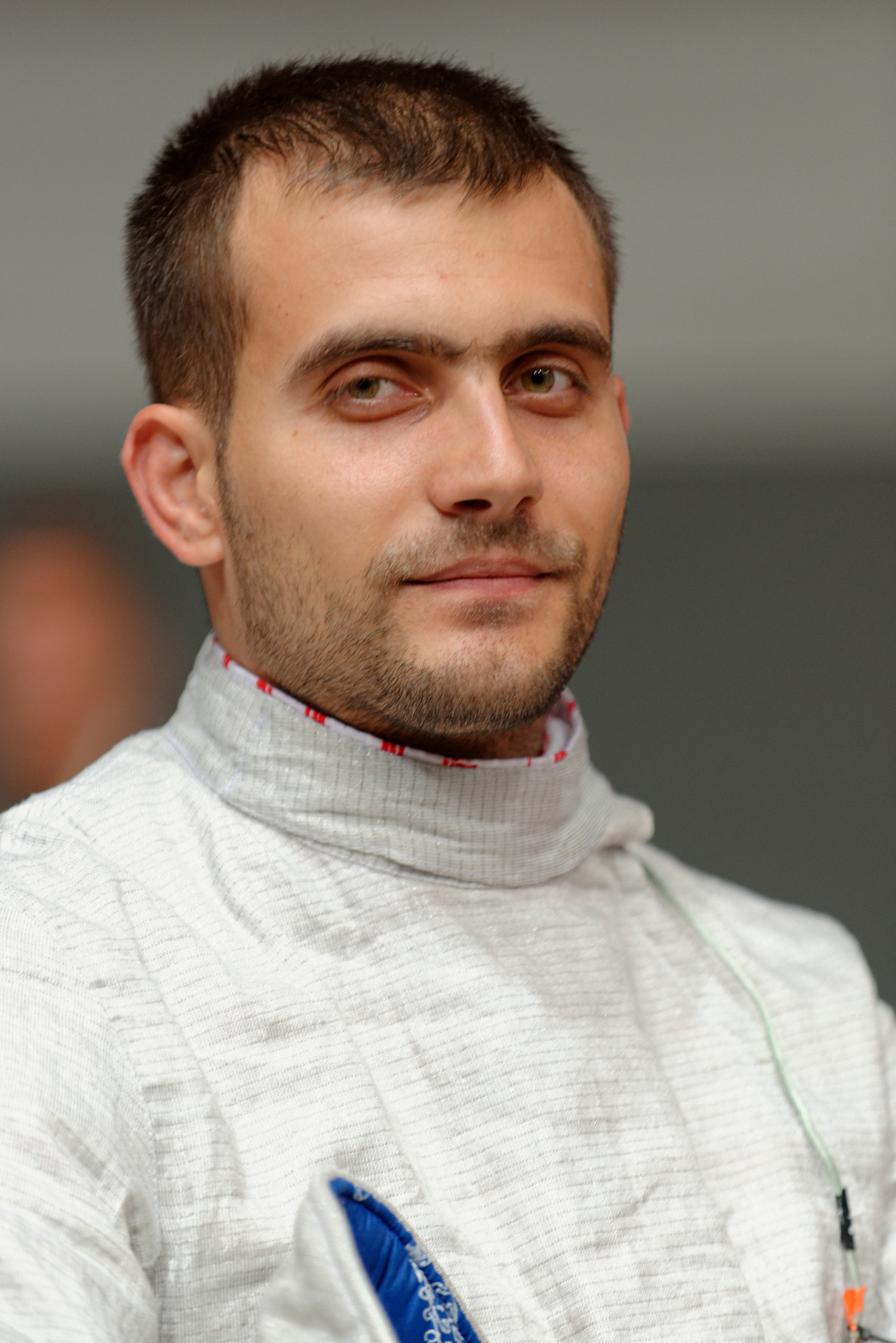
- At the 2013 World Fencing Championships in Budapest

Personal information
- Full name: Tiberiu Alexandru Dolniceanu
- Nickname: Tibi
- Nationality: Romanian
- Born: 3 April 1988 (age 38) Iași, Romania
- Height: 1.79 m (5 ft 10 1/2 in)
- Weight: 74 kg (163 lb; 11.7 st)

Fencing career
- Sport: Fencing
- Country: Romania
- Weapon: Sabre
- Hand: right-handed
- National coach: Mihai Covaliu
- Club: CS Dinamo București
- Assistant coach: Dan Găureanu
- Former coach: Iulian Bițucă
- FIE ranking: current ranking
Medal record
Olympic Games
Silver medal – second place	2012 London	Team
World Championships
Gold medal – first place	2009 Antalya	Team
Silver medal – second place	2013 Budapest	Team
Bronze medal – third place	2010 Paris	Team
Bronze medal – third place	2013 Budapest	Individual
Bronze medal – third place	2014 Kazan	Individual
Bronze medal – third place	2015 Moscow	Individual
Bronze medal – third place	2016 Rio de Janeiro	Team
European Games
Silver medal – second place	2015 Baku	Individual
Silver medal – second place	2015 Baku	Team
European Championships
Gold medal – first place	2013 Zagreb	Individual
Silver medal – second place	2012 Legnano	Team
Bronze medal – third place	2016 Toruń	Team

Tiberiu Dolniceanu (Romanian pronunciation: [tiˈberju dolniˈt͡ʃe̯anu]; born 3 April 1988) is a Romanian sabre fencer, European champion in 2013 and bronze medal in the 2013 World championships. As part of Romania's sabre team, he won the team silver medal in the 2012 Summer Olympics and the team gold medal in the 2009 World Championships in Antalya.

== Fencing career ==
=== Junior ===
Dolniceanu began fencing at age 13 under the coaching of Iulian Bițucă at CSM Iași. The absence of his parents, who had gone to work in Italy, pushed him to train hard. He took his first international podium in the Junior World Cup in Budapest in 2006. The same year, he earned a silver medal in the Junior World Championships in Poznań, after being defeated by future Olympic champion Áron Szilágyi. He took the bronze medal in the Junior European Championships in Prague in 2007 and reached number one in junior rankings in early 2008.

=== 2008–2012 ===
His progress was slower amongst seniors, but he joined the national sabre team. Along with Florin Zalomir, Cosmin Hănceanu, and Rareș Dumitrescu, Romania created a surprise by beating favourite Italy to win the gold medal in the 2009 World Championships in Antalya. For this performance, Dolniceanu and his teammates received the Order of Sports Merit, class IIa. The same team went on to win the bronze in the 2010 World Championships in Paris. Dolniceanu transferred in 2011 to CS Dinamo București and began training under Mihai Covaliu, who also coaches the national team.

He took part in the 2012 Summer Olympics, but was beaten in the second round by United States' Daryl Homer. In the team event, sixth-seeded Romania disposed of China 45–30 to meet Russia in the semi-finals. Dolniceanu gave his team a 20–17 lead, but a crash with Nikolay Kovalev awakened a right-ankle sprain sustained during the 2012 European Championships; he also broke a nail on his weapon hand and had to receive medical treatment. Romania were dominated 45–26 by South Korea in the final, Dolniceanu being the only one to win a bout, and took the silver medal.

=== After the London Games ===
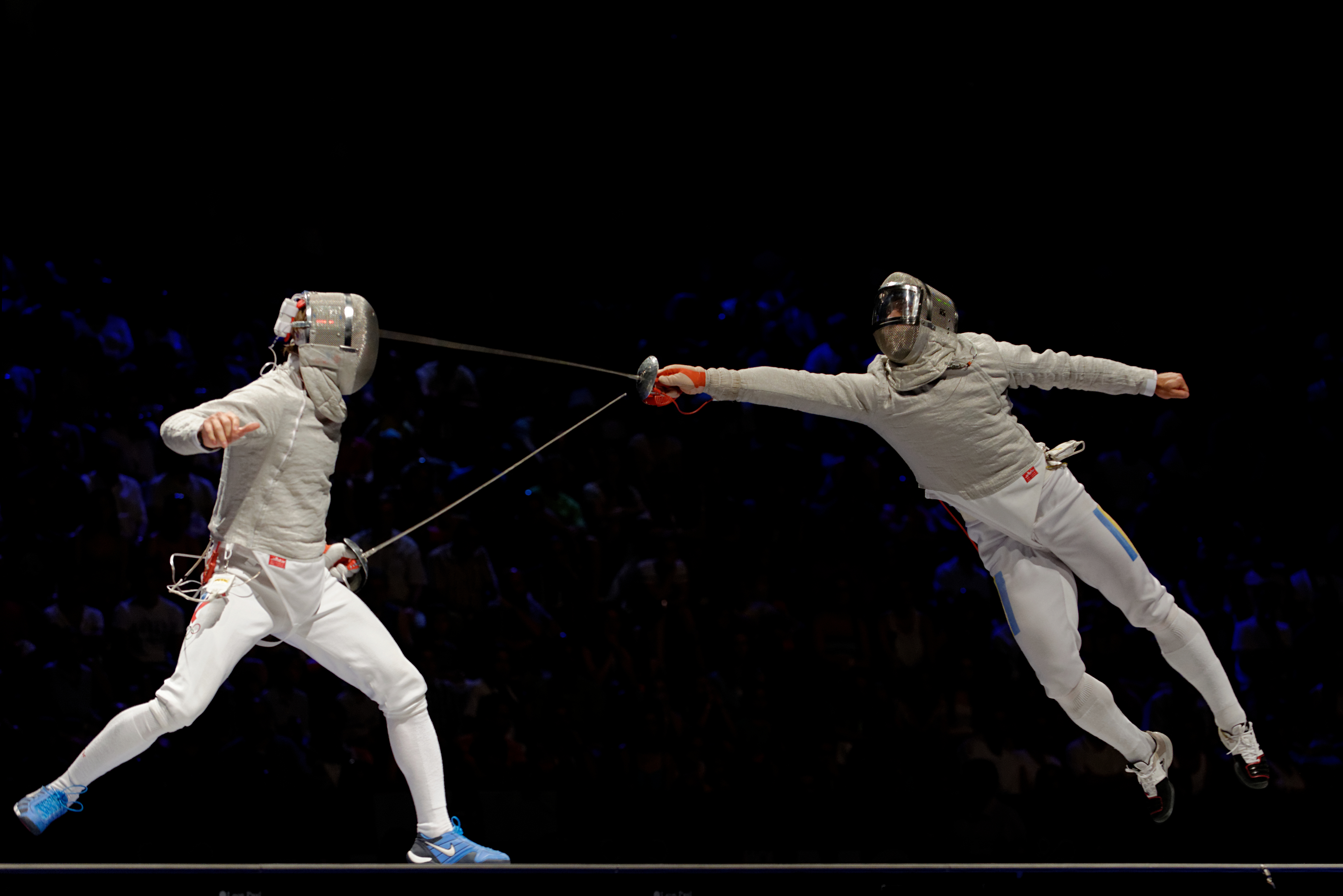
Dolniceanu (R) fences Reshetnikov in the 2013 World Championships

After the Games three of the four members of the Olympic team chose to retire, Formerly the team's benjamin, Dolniceanu became captain of the new team, with Alin Badea and Ciprian Gălățeanu as full members and Iulian Teodosiu and Mădălin Bucur as reserves.

Dolniceanu began the 2012–13 season with a silver medal in the Plovdiv Grand Prix. In the European Championships in Zagreb, he defeated 15–11 the three-time incumbent Aleksey Yakimenko of Russia to win the individual gold medal. An injury sustained in the quarter-final prevented him from taking part in the team event, which Romania finished in the fourth place.

Dolniceanu went to earn the bronze medal and the team silver medal in the World Fencing Championships in Budapest. He also won the silver in the 2013 World Combat Games. For these performances he was voted sportsman of the year by the Romanian Sport Press Association and fencer of the year by the Romanian Fencing Federation.

In the 2013–14 season Dolniceanu won the bronze medal in the first stage of the World Cup in Madrid. This result pushed him to the first place in world rankings. He went on to win in Moscow the first World Cup tournament of his career after defeating Korea's Kim Jung-hwan. In March he helped his club CS Dinamo to win the European Champion Clubs' Cup in Gödöllő, after prevailing over Áron Szilágyi's Vasas SC, at the price of a right-foot tendon injury during the final. He sustained another injury, this time to the left ankle, at the Plovdiv World Cup, where he posted a third place. At the 2014 European Championships he was stopped in the second round by France's Nicolas Rousset. In the team event Romania were defeated in the quarter-finals by Belarus and placed fifth after the ranking matches.

At the 2014 World Championships Dolniceanu reached the semifinals, but he was defeated by Russia's Kovalev, against whom he had prevailed in the same phase at the 2013 European championships, and came away with his second bronze medal in a row. In the team event Romania met South Korea in quarter-finals. After a promising beginning for Romania Dolniceanu lost the pace against Kim Jung-hwan. They failed to make up lost ground and lost eventually on a 41–45 score. Romania finished seventh after the ranking matches. Romania's head coach Mihai Covaliu was quoted saying: “This kind of 'block' can happen to the greatest of fencers. I hope Tibi learns from it.” Dolniceanu finished the season no.5 in world rankings. Thanks to his bronze medal he was named fencer of the year by the Romanian Fencing Federation for the second year in a row.

In the 2014–15 season Dolniceanu failed to get past the table of 16 in Budapest, New York and Padova: he was defeated respectively by teammate Teodosiu and two South Koreans. He was happier in the team competition, striking the decisive hit in the final against Italy in Budapest and winning gold for Romania. He also led CS Dinamo to a silver medal in the European Champion Clubs' Cup in Padova.

He reached the semi-finals of the men's individual sabre at the 2016 Olympics. There was no team event.
