= 2013 World Fencing Championships =

International fencing competition

2013 World Championships in Fencing
- Dates: 5–12 August
- Host city: Budapest, Hungary
- Venue: Syma Sport and Events Centre
- Nations participating: 101
- Athletes participating: 827
- Events: 12

The 2013 World Fencing Championships were held at Budapest, Hungary from 5–12 August.

== Schedule ==
Date	Event
7 August 2013	Men's sabre
7 August 2013	Women's foil
8 August 2013	Men's épée
8 August 2013	Women's épée
9 August 2013	Men's foil
9 August 2013	Women's sabre
10 August 2013	Men's team sabre
10 August 2013	Women's team foil
11 August 2013	Men's team épée
11 August 2013	Women's team épée
12 August 2013	Men's team foil
12 August 2013	Women's team sabre

== Medal summary ==
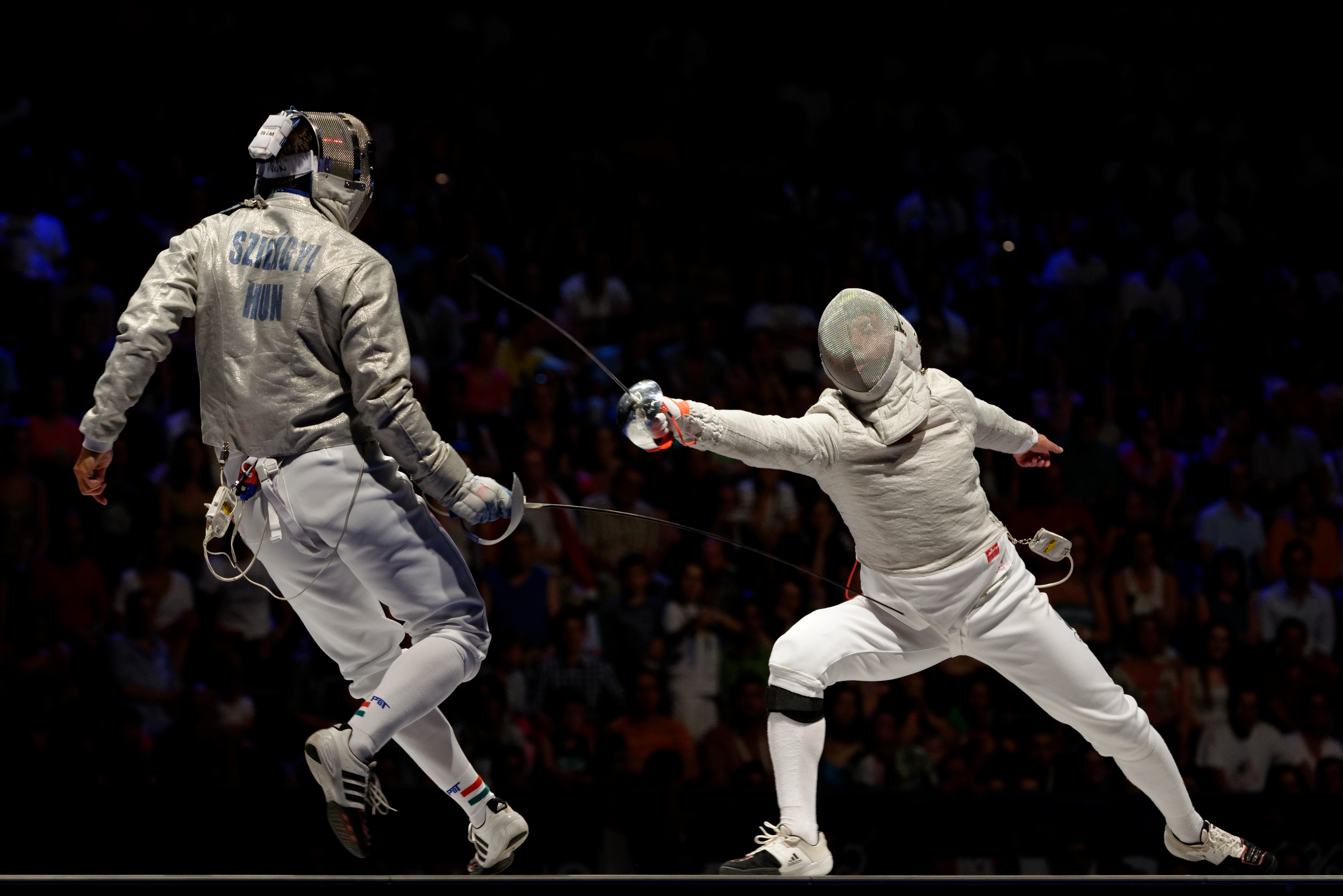
Nikolay Kovalev (R) attacks Áron Szilágyi (L) of Hungary in the semi-finals of the 2013 World Fencing Championships

=== Medal table ===
* Host nation (Hungary)

Rank	Nation	Gold	Silver	Bronze	Total
1	Russia	3	5	3	11
2	Italy	3	0	3	6
3	Ukraine	2	1	1	4
4	Estonia	2	0	0	2
5	United States	1	1	1	3
6	Hungary*	1	0	2	3
7	France	0	1	2	3
7	Romania	0	1	2	3
9	Germany	0	1	1	2
10	China	0	1	0	1
10	Venezuela	0	1	0	1
12	South Korea	0	0	2	2
13	Switzerland	0	0	1	1
Totals (13 entries)		12	12	18	42

=== Men's events ===
Event	Gold	Silver	Bronze
Individual Épée	Nikolai Novosjolov (EST)	Rubén Limardo (VEN)	Fabian Kauter (SUI); Pavel Sukhov (RUS)
Team Épée	Hungary; Géza Imre; Gábor Boczkó; András Rédli; Péter Szényi	Ukraine; Anatoliy Herey; Dmytro Karyuchenko; Vitalii Medvediev; Bohdan Nikishyn	France; Alexandre Blaszyck; Daniel Jerent; Ulrich Robeiri; Iván Trevejo
Individual Foil	Miles Chamley-Watson (USA)	Artur Akhmatkhuzin (RUS)	Rostyslav Hertsyk (UKR); Valerio Aspromonte (ITA)
Team Foil	Italy; Valerio Aspromonte; Giorgio Avola; Andrea Baldini; Andrea Cassarà	United States; Miles Chamley-Watson; Race Imboden; Alexander Massialas; Gerek Meinhardt	France; Jérémy Cadot; Erwann Le Péchoux; Enzo Lefort; Marcel Marcilloux
Individual Sabre	Veniamin Reshetnikov (RUS)	Nikolay Kovalev (RUS)	Tiberiu Dolniceanu (ROU); Áron Szilágyi (HUN)
Team Sabre	Russia; Kamil Ibragimov; Nikolay Kovalev; Veniamin Reshetnikov; Aleksey Yakimenko	Romania; Alin Badea; Tiberiu Dolniceanu; Ciprian Gălățanu; Iulian Teodosiu	South Korea; Gu Bon-gil; Kim Jung-hwan; Oh Eun-seok; Won Jun-ho

=== Women's events ===
Event	Gold	Silver	Bronze
Individual Épée	Julia Beljajeva (EST)	Anna Sivkova (RUS)	Emese Szász (HUN); Britta Heidemann (GER)
Team Épée	Russia; Tatyana Andryushina; Violetta Kolobova; Anna Sivkova; Yana Zvereva	China; Hou Yingming; Luo Xiaojuan; Sun Yiwen; Xu Anqi	Romania; Ana Maria Brânză; Simona Pop; Raluca Sbîrcia; Maria Udrea
Individual Foil	Arianna Errigo (ITA)	Carolin Golubytskyi (GER)	Elisa Di Francisca (ITA); Inna Deriglazova (RUS)
Team foil	Italy; Elisa Di Francisca; Carolina Erba; Arianna Errigo; Valentina Vezzali	France; Anita Blaze; Astrid Guyart; Corinne Maîtrejean; Ysaora Thibus	Russia; Yuliya Biryukova; Inna Deriglazova; Larisa Korobeynikova; Diana Yakovleva
Individual Sabre	Olha Kharlan (UKR)	Yekaterina Dyachenko (RUS)	Kim Ji-yeon (KOR); Irene Vecchi (ITA)
Team sabre	Ukraine; Olha Kharlan; Alina Komashchuk; Halyna Pundyk; Olena Voronina	Russia; Yekaterina Dyachenko; Yana Egorian; Dina Galiakbarova; Yuliya Gavrilova	United States; Ibtihaj Muhammad; Anne-Elizabeth Stone; Dagmara Wozniak; Mariel Zagunis

== Participating nations ==
827 fencers from 101 countries competed.

- Algeria (1)
- Argentina (13)
- Australia (18)
- Austria (4)
- Azerbaijan (5)
- Barbados (1)
- Belarus (13)
- Belgium (4)
- Benin (1)
- Bermuda (2)
- Brazil (23)
- Brunei (1)
- Bulgaria (8)
- Cameroon (1)
- Canada (24)
- Chile (6)
- China (21)
- Chinese Taipei (7)
- Colombia (11)
- Costa Rica (1)
- Croatia (7)
- Cuba (1)
- Czech Republic (15)
- Denmark (10)
- DR Congo (4)
- Ecuador (2)
- Egypt (10)
- El Salvador (3)
- Estonia (8)
- Finland (9)
- France (26)
- Georgia (10)
- Germany (25)
- Great Britain (11)
- Greece (14)
- Guatemala (1)
- Honduras (1)
- Hong Kong (24)
- Hungary (Host) (25)
- Iceland (1)
- India (1)
- Indonesia (1)
- Iran (9)
- Israel (16)
- Italy (25)
- Japan (25)
- Kazakhstan (17)
- Kuwait (7)
- Kyrgyzstan (4)
- Latvia (4)
- Lebanon (2)
- Libya (1)
- Lithuania (3)
- Luxembourg (1)
- Malaysia (1)
- Malta (1)
- Mauritius (1)
- Mexico (19)
- Moldova (2)
- Monaco (1)
- Mongolia (8)
- Morocco (3)
- Namibia (1)
- Netherlands (2)
- New Zealand (1)
- Nigeria (1)
- Norway (5)
- Pakistan (1)
- Panama (5)
- Paraguay (1)
- Peru (2)
- Philippines (1)
- Poland (24)
- Portugal (7)
- Puerto Rico (1)
- Romania (15)
- Russia (24)
- Senegal (2)
- Serbia (8)
- Singapore (20)
- Slovakia (4)
- Slovenia (9)
- South Africa (3)
- South Korea (24)
- Spain (14)
- Sri Lanka (1)
- Sweden (5)
- Switzerland (8)
- Tajikistan (2)
- Thailand (4)
- Togo (1)
- Tunisia (4)
- Turkey (13)
- Turkmenistan (5)
- U.S. Virgin Islands (1)
- Ukraine (26)
- United States (24)
- Uruguay (2)
- Uzbekistan (8)
- Venezuela (23)
- Vietnam (1)
