= Aliaksei Likhacheuski =

Belarusian fencer (born 1990)

Personal information
- Born: 28 June 1990 (age 36) Brest, Belarus
- Home town: Minsk, Belarus
- Height: 1.89 m (6 ft 2 in)
- Weight: 81 kg (179 lb)

Fencing career
- Sport: Fencing
- Weapon: Sabre
- Hand: Right-handed
- National coach: Aliaksandr Surimto
- FIE ranking: current ranking
Medal record
Men's sabre fencing
Representing Belarus
World Championships
Silver medal – second place	2011 Catania	Team sabre
European Championships
Silver medal – second place	2012 Legnano	Individual sabre

Aliaksei Likhacheuski (Belarusian: Аляксей Ліхачэўскі, Russian: Алексей Лихачевский; born 28 June 1990) is a Belarusian sabre fencer, team silver medallist at the 2011 World Championships in Catania. He took part in the team event at the 2012 Summer Olympics, where Belarus ended 7th.
