= Nikolay Kovalev (fencer) =

Russian sabre fencer

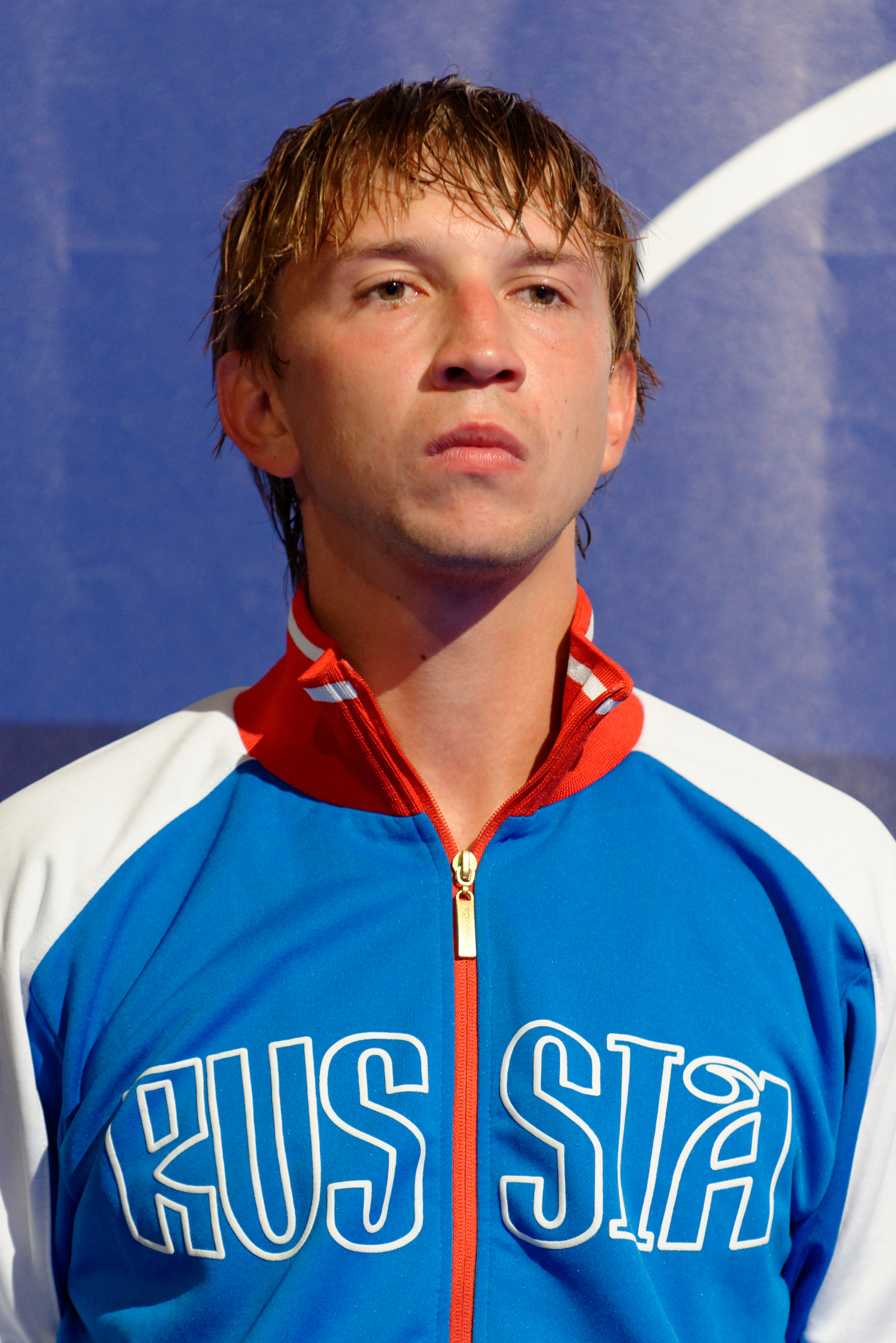
- Nikolay Kovalev stands on podium after winning gold at 2014 Kazan World Championships.

Personal information
- Full name: Nikolay Anatolyevich Kovalev
- Nicknames: Kolya, Nick, and Coach K
- Nationality: Russian
- Born: 26 October 1986 (age 39) Vesyoly, Russian SFSR, Soviet Union
- Height: 1.76 m (5 ft 9 in)
- Weight: 71 kg (157 lb)

Fencing career
- Sport: Fencing
- Weapon: Sabre
- Hand: Right-handed
- National coach: Christian Bauer
- Club: SKA Saint-Petersburg
- Head coach: Vladimir Dyachenko
- FIE ranking: current ranking
Medal record
Olympic Games
Bronze medal – third place	2012 London	Individual sabre
World Championships
Gold medal – first place	2011 Catania	Team sabre
Gold medal – first place	2013 Budapest	Team sabre
Gold medal – first place	2014 Kazan	Individual sabre
Gold medal – first place	2016 Rio de Janeiro	Team sabre
Silver medal – second place	2013 Budapest	Individual sabre
Silver medal – second place	2015 Moscow	Team sabre
Bronze medal – third place	2006 Turin	Team sabre
European Championships
Gold medal – first place	2007 Ghent	Team sabre
Gold medal – first place	2012 Legnano	Team sabre
Gold medal – first place	2016 Toruń	Team sabre
Bronze medal – third place	2006 İzmir	Team sabre
Bronze medal – third place	2013 Zagreb	Individual sabre

Nikolay Anatolyevich Kovalev (Russian: Николай Анатольевич Ковалёв; born 28 October 1986) is a Russian former sabre fencer. He won a bronze medal in the 2012 Summer Olympics in London and a gold medal in the 2014 World Championships in Kazan. He is three-times World team champion (2010, 2011 and 2013) and twice European team champion (2007 and 2012). He is now a coach in California in the United States.

== Career ==
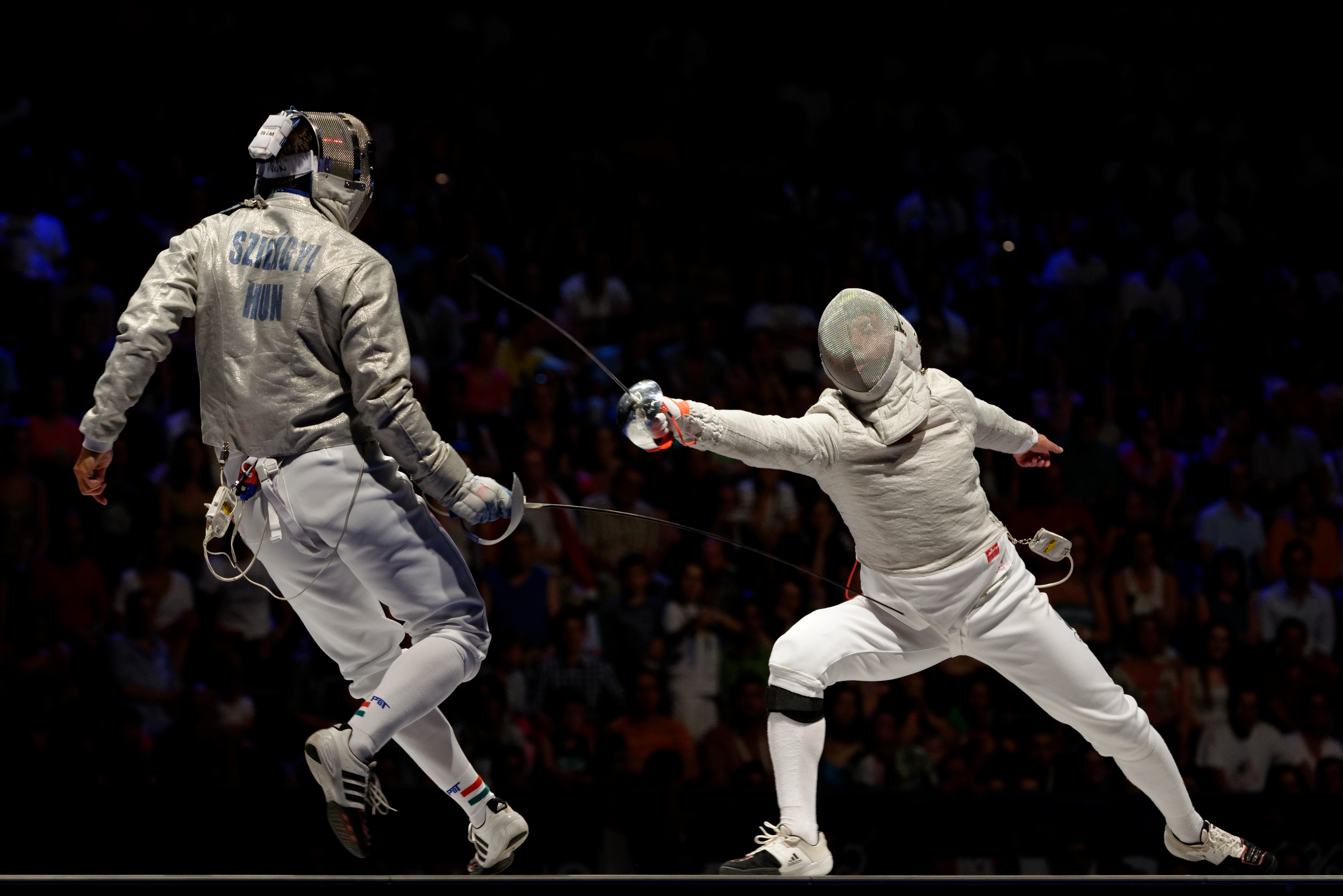
Kovalev (R) attacks Áron Szilágyi (L) of Hungary in the semi-finals of the 2013 World Fencing Championships

Kovalev became European Junior champion in 2002 at Conegliano. He won the silver medal in the 2005 Junior World Championships at Linz, then a bronze medal in the 2006 Junior World Championships at Taebaek City.

Amongst seniors, he climbed his first World Cup podium in 2006 with a second place in the Gerevich-Kovács-Kárpáti Cup in Budapest. He won the team gold medal in the 2006 European Championships. He went on to earn the team bronze medal at the 2006 World Fencing Championships in Turin with Aleksey Frosin, Stanislav Pozdnyakov and Aleksey Yakimenko, after Russia defeated Hungary in the match for the third place.

Kovalev took part in the 2008 Summer Olympics in Beijing, but was defeated in the table of 32 by Jaime Martí of Spain. In the team event, Russia were stopped in the semi-finals by the United States, then defeated by Italy in the match for the third place, and Kovalev returned without a medal.

In the 2010 World Championships, Russia met Italy in the final. Kovalev came back from 4–15 in the fourth relay to give Russia the lead, scoring 12 hits against Luigi Tarantino. Russia eventually defeated Italy 45 to 41, allowing mates Aleksey Yakimenko, Artem Zanin, Veniamin Reshetnikov and Kovalev to take the gold. At the 2011 World Championships they retained the title in men's sabre team defeating Belarus in the final.

In the 2012 Summer Olympics in London, Kovalev advanced to the semi-finals, where he was defeated by Áron Szilágyi of Hungary. He then prevailed over Romania's Rareș Dumitrescu to come away with the bronze medal. He attributed his success to national coach Christian Bauer, who according to him introduced Russia to the world of modern fencing. He received the title of "Honored Master of Sports" for his Olympic performance, but did not particularly enjoy the attention it brought to him, describing the constant interviews and photo shoots as "a horror".

In the 2013 World Championships in Budapest, Kovalev made his way to the semi-finals, where he defeated Áron Szilágyi. He then met teammate Veniamin Reshetnikov, who prevailed 15–13, dooming Kovalev to a silver medal. In the team event, Russia prevailed over reigning Olympic champion South Korea, then defeated Romania to take the gold medal. During the event Kovalev was also elected a member of the International Fencing Federation's athlete commission.

As of 2024, he is a coach at West Coast Fencing Academy in Southern California in the United States.
