= 2010 European Fencing Championships =

Fencing Championship

The 2010 European Fencing Championships was the 23rd edition and was held in Leipzig, Germany. The event took place from July 17–22, 2010.

== Schedule ==
●	Opening Ceremony	●	Finals	●	Closing Ceremony

July	17	18	19	20	21	22	Total
Ceremonies	●					●	
Épée Individual		Women	Men				2
Épée team					Women	Men	2
Foil Individual	Women	Men					2
Foil Team				Women	Men		2
Sabre Individual	Men		Women				2
Sabre Team				Men		Women	2
Total Gold Medals	2	2	2	2	2	2	12

== Medal summary ==
=== Men's events ===
Event	Gold	Silver	Bronze
Épée	Jean-Michel Lucenay (FRA)	Gábor Boczkó (HUN)	Pavel Sukhov (RUS); Radosław Zawrotniak (POL)
Foil	Andrea Baldini (ITA)	Valerio Aspromonte (ITA)	Renal Ganeyev (RUS); Richard Kruse (GBR)
Sabre	Aleksey Yakimenko (RUS)	Nicolas Limbach (GER)	Boladé Apithy (FRA); Oleh Shturbabin (UKR)
Team Épée	Hungary	Ukraine	Germany
Team Foil	Italy	Russia	United Kingdom
Team Sabre	Italy	Ukraine	Germany

=== Women's events ===
Event	Gold	Silver	Bronze
Épée	Imke Duplitzer (GER)	Magdalena Piekarska (POL)	Laura Flessel-Colovic (FRA); Noam Mills (ISR)
Foil	Valentina Vezzali (ITA)	Yevgeniya Lamonova (RUS)	Inna Deriglazova (RUS); Elisa Di Francisca (ITA)
Sabre	Svetlana Kormilitsyna (RUS)	Sofiya Velikaya (RUS)	Ilaria Bianco (ITA); Sibylle Klemm (DEU)
Team Épée	Poland	Italy	France
Team Foil	Italy	Germany	Russia
Team Sabre	Ukraine	Russia	Italy

== Medal table ==
Rank	Nation	Gold	Silver	Bronze	Total
1	Italy (ITA)	5	2	3	10
2	Russia (RUS)	2	4	4	10
3	Germany (GER)	1	2	3	6
4	Ukraine (UKR)	1	2	1	4
5	Poland (POL)	1	1	1	3
6	Hungary (HUN)	1	1	0	2
7	France (FRA)	1	0	3	4
8	Great Britain (GBR)	0	0	2	2
9	Israel (ISR)	0	0	1	1
Totals (9 entries)		12	12	18	42

== Results overview ==
=== Men ===
==== Foil individual ====
Position	Name	Country
1st place, gold medalist(s)	Andrea Baldini	Italy
2nd place, silver medalist(s)	Valerio Aspromonte	Italy
3rd place, bronze medalist(s)	Renal Ganeyev	Russia
3rd place, bronze medalist(s)	Richard Kruse	United Kingdom
5.	Marcin Zawada	Poland
6.	Leszek Rajski	Poland
7.	Erwann Le Péchoux	France
8.	Artem Sedov	Russia

Quarter-finals
(Russia) Artem Sedov	5
(Italy) Andrea Baldini	15
(Poland) Marcin Zawada	8
(Russia) Renal Ganeyev	15
(France) Erwann Le Péchoux	13
(United Kingdom) Richard Kruse	14
(Poland) Leszek Rajski	13
(Italy) Valerio Aspromonte	15

Semi-finals
(Italy) Andrea Baldini	11
(Russia) Renal Ganeyev	3
(United Kingdom) Richard Kruse	14
(Italy) Valerio Aspromonte	15

Final
(Italy) Andrea Baldini	15
(Italy) Valerio Aspromonte	11

==== Foil team ====
Position	Name	Country
1st place, gold medalist(s)	Valerio Aspromonte; Giorgio Avola; Andrea Baldini; Andrea Cassarà	Italy
2nd place, silver medalist(s)	Aleksey Cheremisinov; Renal Ganeyev; Aleksey Khovanskiy; Artem Sedov	Russia
3rd place, bronze medalist(s)	Laurence Halsted; Edward Jefferies; Richard Kruse; Marcus Mepstead	United Kingdom
4.	Paweł Kawiecki; Leszek Rajski; Radosław Glonek; Marcin Zawada	Poland
5.	Tobias Hinterseer; Rene Pranz; Roland Schlosser; Moritz Hinterseer	Austria
6.	Aliaksandr Chaliankov; Siarhei Byk; Vladzimir Lyshkovski; Andrei Kuryshka	Belarus
7.	André Weßels; Peter Joppich; Benjamin Kleibrink; Sebastian Bachmann	Germany
8.	Alexandru Diaconu; Radu Dărăban; Virgil Sălișcan	Romania

Quarter-finals
Italy	45
Romania	39
Poland	45
Belarus	23
Germany	41
United Kingdom	45
Austria	24
Russia	45

Semi-finals
Italy	44
Poland	22
United Kingdom	22
Russia	43

Final
Italy	45
Russia	33
Third place
Poland	37
United Kingdom	44

==== Epée individual ====
Position	Name	Country
1st place, gold medalist(s)	Jean-Michel Lucenay	France
2nd place, silver medalist(s)	Gábor Boczkó	Hungary
3rd place, bronze medalist(s)	Pavel Sukhov	Russia
3rd place, bronze medalist(s)	Radosław Zawrotniak	Poland
5.	Gauthier Grumier	France
6.	Alfredo Rota	Italy
7.	Matteo Tagliariol	Italy
8.	Max Heinzer	Switzerland

Quarter-finals
(France) J-M Lucenay	15
(Italy) Matteo Tagliariol	12
(Italy) Alfredo Rota	13
(Poland) R Zawrotniak	15
(France) Gauthier Grumier	13
(Russia) Pavel Sukhov	15
(Switzerland) Max Heinzer	10
(Hungary) Gábor Boczkó	15

Semi-finals
(France) J-M Lucenay	15
(Poland) R Zawrotniak	11
(Russia) Pavel Sukhov	9
(Hungary) Gábor Boczkó	15

Final
(France) J-M Lucenay	15
(Hungary) Gábor Boczkó	11

==== Epée team ====
Position	Name	Country
1st place, gold medalist(s)	Gábor Boczkó; Géza Imre; Tamás Padar; Péter Somfai	Hungary
2nd place, silver medalist(s)	Dmytro Karyuchenko; Maksym Khvorost; Bohdan Nikishyn; Ihor Reyzlin	Ukraine
3rd place, bronze medalist(s)	Jörg Fiedler; Christoph Kneip; Steffen Launer; Martin Schmitt	Germany
4.	Max Heinzer; Benjamin Steffen; Fabian Kauter; Sebastien Lamon	Switzerland
5.	Alfredo Rota; Matteo Tagliariol; Enrico Garozzo; Paolo Pizzo	Italy
6.	Ulrich Robeiri; Jérôme Jeannet; Jean-Michel Lucenay; Gauthier Grumier	France
7.	Anton Avdeev; Sergey Khodos; Pavel Sukhov; Aleksey Tikhomirov	Russia
8.	Krzysztof Mikołajczak; Tomasz Motyka; Radosław Zawrotniak; Robert Andrzejuk	Poland

Quarter-finals
Hungary	37
Russia	36
Switzerland	43
Italy	42
Poland	35
Germany	45
Ukraine	36
France	34

Semi-finals
Hungary	45
Switzerland	35
Germany	39
Ukraine	45

Final
Hungary	45
Ukraine	39
Third place
Switzerland	34
Germany	35

==== Sabre individual ====
Position	Name	Country
1st place, gold medalist(s)	Aleksey Yakimenko	Russia
2nd place, silver medalist(s)	Nicolas Limbach	Germany
3rd place, bronze medalist(s)	Boladé Apithy	France
3rd place, bronze medalist(s)	Oleh Shturbabin	Ukraine
5.	Veniamin Reshetnikov	Russia
6.	Nicolas Lopez	France
7.	Tiberiu Dolniceanu	Romania
8.	Diego Occhiuzzi	Italy

Quarter-finals
(France) Boladé Apithy	15
(Romania) Tiberiu Dolniceanu	8
(France) Nicolas Lopez	13
(Russia) Aleksey Yakimenko	15
(Ukraine) Oleh Shturbabin	15
(Italy) Diego Occhiuzzi	9
(Germany) Nicolas Limbach	15
(Russia) Veniamin Reshetnikov	12

Semi-finals
(France) Boladé Apithy	10
(Russia) Aleksey Yakimenko	15
(Ukraine) Oleh Shturbabin	8
(Germany) Nicolas Limbach	15

Final
(Russia) Aleksey Yakimenko	15
(Germany) Nicolas Limbach	13

==== Sabre team ====
Position	Name	Country
1st place, gold medalist(s)	Aldo Montano; Diego Occhiuzzi; Luigi Samele; Luigi Tarantino	Italy
2nd place, silver medalist(s)	Dmytro Boyko; Dmytro Pundyk; Oleh Shturbabin; Andriy Yahodka	Ukraine
3rd place, bronze medalist(s)	Benedikt Beisheim; Max Hartung; Björn Hübner; Nicolas Limbach	Germany
4.	Nikolay Kovalev; Veniamin Reshetnikov; Aleksey Yakimenko; Ilia Mokretsov	Russia
5.	Nicolas Lopez; Boladé Apithy; Julien Pillet; Pierre-Luc Wilain	France
6.	Tamás Decsi; Áron Szilágyi; Balázs Lontay; Nikolász Iliász	Hungary
7.	Valery Pryiemka; Aliaksandr Buikevich; Dmitri Lapkes; Aleksei Romanovitch	Belarus
8.	Tiberiu Dolniceanu; Florin Zalomir; Cosmin Hănceanu; Alexandru Sirițeanu	Romania

Quarter-finals
Romania	44
Ukraine	45
Russia	45
Hungary	36
France	36
Germany	45
Belarus	44
Italy	45

Semi-finals
Ukraine	45
Russia	44
Germany	37
Italy	45

Final
Ukraine	28
Italy	45
Third place
Russia	38
Germany	45

=== Women ===
==== Sabre individual ====
Position	Name	Country
1st place, gold medalist(s)	Svetlana Kormilitsyna	Russia
2nd place, silver medalist(s)	Sofiya Velikaya	Russia
3rd place, bronze medalist(s)	Ilaria Bianco	Italy
3rd place, bronze medalist(s)	Sibylle Klemm	Germany
5.	Olha Kharlan	Ukraine
6.	Vassiliki Vougiouka	Greece
7.	Aleksandra Socha	Poland
8.	Yuliya Gavrilova	Russia

Quarter-finals
(Ukraine) Olha Kharlan	11
(Germany) Sibylle Klemm	15
(Russia) Yuliya Gavrilova	11
(Russia) Sofiya Velikaya	15
(Poland) Aleksandra Socha	12
(Russia) S Kormilitsyna	15
(Italy) Ilaria Bianco	15
(Greece) Vassiliki Vougiouka	6

Semi-finals
(Germany) Sibylle Klemm	10
(Russia) Sofiya Velikaya	15
(Russia) S Kormilitsyna	15
(Italy) Ilaria Bianco	11

Final
(Russia) Sofiya Velikaya	13
(Russia) S Kormilitsyna	15

==== Sabre team ====
Position	Name	Country
1st place, gold medalist(s)	Olha Kharlan; Olena Khomrova; Galyna Pundyk; Olha Zhovnir	Ukraine
2nd place, silver medalist(s)	Yekaterina Dyachenko; Yuliya Gavrilova; Svetlana Kormilitsyna; Sofiya Velikaya	Russia
3rd place, bronze medalist(s)	Ilaria Bianco; Alessandra Lucchino; Gioia Marzocca; Irene Vecchi	Italy
4.	Anna Várhelyi; Réka Benkó; Réka Pető; Orsolya Nagy	Hungary
5.	Katarzyna Kędziora; Aleksandra Socha; Bogna Jóźwiak; Irena Więckowska	Poland
6.	Cécilia Berder; Léonore Perrus; Solenne Mary; Carole Vergne	France
7.	Anja Musch; Stefanie Kubissa; Sibylle Klemm; Davina Hirzmann	Germany
8.	Lucia Martin-Portugues; Araceli Navarro; Sandra Marcos; Laia Vila	Spain

Quarter-finals
Russia	45
Spain	28
Italy	45
Poland	31
France	36
Hungary	45
Germany	25
Ukraine	45

Semi-finals
Russia	45
Italy	39
Hungary	30
Ukraine	45

Final
Russia	38
Ukraine	45
Third place
Italy	45
Hungary	40

==== Foil individual ====
Position	Name	Country
1st place, gold medalist(s)	Valentina Vezzali	Italy
2nd place, silver medalist(s)	Yevgeniya Lamonova	Russia
3rd place, bronze medalist(s)	Inna Deriglazova	Russia
3rd place, bronze medalist(s)	Elisa Di Francisca	Italy
5.	Corinne Maîtrejean	France
6.	Olha Leleyko	Ukraine
7.	Arianna Errigo	Italy
8.	Astrid Guyart	France

Quarter-finals
(France) Corinne Maîtrejean	13
(Russia) Inna Deriglazova	15
(Ukraine) Olga Leleyko	6
(Italy) Valentina Vezzali	15
(Italy) Elisa Di Francisca	15
(Italy) Arianna Errigo	6
(Russia) Yevgeniya Lamonova	10
(France) Astrid Guyart	9

Semi-finals
(Russia) Inna Deriglazova	4
(Italy) Valentina Vezzali	14
(Italy) Elisa Di Francisca	8
(Russia) Yevgeniya Lamonova	13

Final
(Italy) Valentina Vezzali	15
(Russia) Yevgeniya Lamonova	4

==== Foil team ====
Position	Name	Country
1st place, gold medalist(s)	Elisa Di Francisca; Arianna Errigo; Ilaria Salvatori; Valentina Vezzali	Italy
2nd place, silver medalist(s)	Sandra Bingenheimer; Carolin Golubytskyi; Katja Wächter; Martina Zacke	Germany
3rd place, bronze medalist(s)	Aida Shanayeva; Inna Deriglazova; Larisa Korobeynikova; Yevgeniya Lamonova	Russia
4.	Karolina Chlewińska; Sylwia Gruchała; Małgorzata Wojtkowiak; Martyna Synoradzka	Poland
5.	Virginie Ujlaky; Astrid Guyart; Corinne Maîtrejean; Gaëlle Gebet	France
6.	Fanny Kreiss; Edina Knapek; Aida Mohamed; Gabriella Varga	Hungary
7.	Kateryna Chentsova; Olha Leleyko; Olena Khismatulina; Anastasiya Moskovska	Ukraine
8.	Anna Bentley; Natalia Sheppard; Martina Emanuel; Hannah Bryars	United Kingdom

Quarter-finals
Italy	45
United Kingdom	24
France	40
Poland	45
Germany	32
Hungary	31
Ukraine	15
Russia	40

Semi-finals
Italy	45
Poland	33
Germany	37
Russia	25

Final
Italy	45
Germany	26
Third place
Poland	29
Russia	30

==== Epée individual ====
Position	Name	Country
1st place, gold medalist(s)	Imke Duplitzer	Germany
2nd place, silver medalist(s)	Magdalena Piekarska	Poland
3rd place, bronze medalist(s)	Laura Flessel-Colovic	France
3rd place, bronze medalist(s)	Noam Mills	Israel
5.	Hajnalka Kiraly Picot	France
6.	Tiffany Geroudet	Switzerland
7.	Francesca Quondamcarlo	Italy
8.	Yana Shemyakina	Ukraine

Quarter-finals
(Israel) Noam Mills	15
(Italy) F. Quondamcarlo	8
(Ukraine) Yana Shemyakina	13
(Germany) Imke Duplitzer	15
(Poland) Magdalena Piekarska	15
(France) Hajnalka Kiraly Picot	8
(Switzerland) Tiffany Geroudet	14
(France) L. Flessel-Colovic	15

Semi-finals
(Israel) Noam Mills	8
(Germany) Imke Duplitzer	15
(Poland) Magdalena Piekarska	13
(France) L. Flessel-Colovic	12

Final
(Germany) Imke Duplitzer	15
(Poland) Magdalena Piekarska	10

==== Épée team ====
Position	Name	Country
1st place, gold medalist(s)	Danuta Dmowska-Andrzejuk; Ewa Nelip; Magdalena Piekarska; Małgorzata Stroka	Poland
2nd place, silver medalist(s)	Bianca Del Carretto; Nathalie Moellhausen; Mara Navarria; Francesca Quondamcarlo	Italy
3rd place, bronze medalist(s)	Nathalie Alibert; Maureen Nisima; Hajnalka Kiraly Picot; Laura Flessel-Colovic	France
4.	Imke Duplitzer; Britta Heidemann; Monika Sozanska; Ricarda Multerer	Germany
5.	Anca Măroiu; Iuliana Măceșeanu; Simona Alexandru; Ana Maria Brânză	Romania
6.	Nina Westman; Emma Samuelsson; Kinka Barvestad; Johanna Bergdahl	Sweden
7.	Dorina Budai; Emese Szász; Emese Takács; Edina Antal	Hungary
8.	Hannah Lawrence; Mary Cohen; Corinna Lawrence; Elisa Albini	United Kingdom

Quarter-finals
Poland	45
Sweden	36
United Kingdom	19
Germany	25
Romania	40
France	44
Hungary	31
Italy	33

Semi-finals
Poland	27
Germany	26
France	35
Italy	36

Final
Poland	35
Italy	30
Third place
Germany	35
France	45
