= 2012–13 Fencing World Cup =

International fencing competition

The 42nd FIE Fencing World Cup began in October 2012 and concluded in July 2013 at the 2013 World Fencing Championships held in Budapest. Andrea Cassarà of Italy won the title for a record fifth time in men's foil, while Romania's Ana Maria Brânză ended up the top-ranked fencer in women's épée for a record third time. The World Cup medals were awarded during the FIE's gala dinner in Paris at the Automobile Club de France on 30 November 2013.

== Individual Épée ==
=== Top 10 ===
Men
1	(Venezuela) Rubén Limardo	204
2	(Estonia) Nikolai Novosjolov	197
3	(Switzerland) Max Heinzer	167
4	(Hungary) Gábor Boczkó	165
5	(Switzerland) Fabian Kauter	162
6	(Venezuela) Silvio Fernández	146
7	(Germany) Jörg Fiedler	124
8	(Ukraine) Bogdan Nikishin	112
9	(France) Ulrich Robeiri	98
10	(France) Ivan Trevejo	97

Women
1	(Romania) Ana Maria Brânză	258
2	(Russia) Anna Sivkova	207
3	(Hungary) Emese Szász	185
4	(China) Xu Anqi	139
5	(China) Sun Yujie	126
6	(South Korea) Shin A-lam	122
7	(Italy) Rossella Fiamingo	107
8	(Germany) Britta Heidemann	103
9	(Estonia) Julia Beljajeva	102
10	(Estonia) Irina Embrich	101

=== Men's épée ===
Date	Event	Type	Gold	Silver	Bronze
13 October 2012	Kupittaa tournament, Turku	Satellite	Mihails Jefremenko (LAT)	Niko Vuorinen (FIN)	Peeter Turnau (EST); Rasmus Mellanen (FIN)
27 October 2012	Tournoi satellite, Copenhagen	Satellite	Kasper Roslander (FIN)	Teemu Seeve (FIN)	Julian Seidl (CZE); João Cordeiro (POR)
10 November 2012	Tournoi satellite, Arhus	Satellite	Frederik von der Osten (DEN)	Kasper Roslander (FIN)	Carlo Rota (ESP); Michal Čupr (CZE)
17 November 2012	Tournoi satellite, Antalya	Satellite	João Cordeiro (POR)	José Manuel Damas (VEN)	Vitas Babbi (ITA); Evgeny Naumkin (KGZ)
24 November 2012	Tournoi satellite, Oslo	Satellite	Rubén Limardo (VEN)	Bartosz Piasecki (NOR)	Dino Milak (NOR); Mihails Jefremenko (LAT)
1 December 2012	Belgrade Trophy, Belgrade	Satellite	Danilo Nikolić (SRB)	Solt Serra (HUN)	Pedro Arêde (POR); João Cordeiro (POR)
8 December 2012	Tournoi satellite, Dublin	Satellite	Federico Bollati (ITA)	Ricardo Candeias (POR)	Pedro Arêde (POR); João Cordeiro (POR)
12 January 2013	SAF Pokalen, Stockholm	Satellite	Nikolai Novosjolov (EST)	Robin Kase (SWE)	Sten Priinits (EST); Jüri Salm (EST)
18 January 2013	Grand Prix du Qatar, Doha	Grand Prix	Gábor Boczkó (HUN)	Anton Avdeev (RUS)	Alexandre Blaszyck (FRA); Nikolai Novosjolov (EST)
25 January 2013	Coupe du monde, Legnano	World Cup	Max Heinzer (SUI)	Silvio Fernández (VEN)	Jung Jin-sun (KOR); András Rédli (HUN)
15 February 2013	Heidenheimer Pokal, Heidenheim an der Brenz	World Cup	Bohdan Nikishyn (UKR)	Ulrich Robeiri (FRA)	Radosław Zawrotniak (POL); Enrico Garozzo (ITA)
23 February 2013	International Hapoel games, Ashkelon	Satellite	Yuval Shalom Freilich (ISR)	Ido Ajzenstadt (ISR)	Ido Herpe (ISR); Daniel Lis (ISR)
15 March 2013	Glaive de Tallinn, Tallinn	World Cup	Max Heinzer (SUI)	Song Jae-ho (KOR)	Fabian Kauter (SUI); Silvio Fernández (VEN)
23 March 2013	Victor Gantsevich Grand Prix, Vancouver	Grand Prix	Matteo Tagliariol (ITA)	Nikolai Novosjolov (EST)	Gábor Boczkó (HUN)} Jörg Fiedler (GER)
3 May 2013	Challenge Réseau ferré de France-Trophée Monal, Paris	World Cup	Daniel Jérent (FRA)	Alexandre Blaszyck (FRA)	Nikolai Novosjolov (EST); Iván Trevejo (FRA)
11 May 2013	Tissot Grand Prix de Berne, Bern	Grand Prix	Max Heinzer (SUI)	Bohdan Nikishyn (UKR)	Fabian Kauter (SUI); Silvio Fernández (VEN)
18 May 2013	Tournoi satellite, Split	Satellite	Jorg Mathe (AUT)	Solt Serra (HUN)	Uwe Kirschen (GER); Athos Schwantes (BRA)
24 May 2013	Jockey Club Argentino, Buenos Aires	World Cup	Rubén Limardo (VEN)	Jiří Beran (CZE)	Norman Ackermann (GER); Radosław Zawrotniak (POL)
16 June 2013	Pan American Championships, Cartagena	Zone	Silvio Fernández (VEN)	Hugues Boisvert-Simard (CAN)	Rubén Limardo (VEN); Ringo Quintero Álvarez (CUB)
16 June 2013	European Championships, Zagreb	Zone	Jörg Fiedler (GER)	Daniel Jérent (FRA)	Krzysztof Mikołajczak (POL); Ulrich Robeiri (FRA)
4 June 2013	Asian Championships, Shanghai	Zone	Elmir Alimzhanov (KAZ)	Kweon Young-jun (KOR)	Li Guojie (CHN); Kim Sang-min (KOR)
27 June 2013	African Championships, Cape Town	Zone	Khaled Buhdeima (LBN)	Ahmed Nabil (MAR)	Abdelkarim El Haouari (LBN); Ayman Mohamed Fayez (EGY)
6 August 2013	World Championships, Budapest	World	Nikolai Novosjolov (EST)	Rubén Limardo (VEN)	Fabian Kauter (SUI); Pavel Sukhov (RUS)

=== Women's épée ===
Date	Event	Type	Gold	Silver	Bronze
14 October 2012	Kupittaa tournament, Turku	Satellite	Irina Embrich (EST)	Johanna Bergdahl (EST)	Sofie Larsson (SWE); Katrina Lehis (EST)
27 October 2012	Tournoi satellite, Copenhague	Satellite	Emma Samuelsson (SWE)	Joanna Halls (AUS)	Sanne Gars (EST); Catharina KOCK (FIN)
10 November 2012	Tournoi satellite, Arhus	Satellite	Lizzie Assi (VEN)	Julia Kirschen (GER)	Suvi Lehtonen (FIN); Karin Louise Hooge (DEN)
17 November 2012	Tournoi satellite, Antalya	Satellite	Gökçe Günaç (TUR)	Maya Mansouri (TUR)	Anja Schünke (GER); Lis Fautsch (LUX)
25 November 2012	Tournoi satellite, Oslo	Satellite	Sanne Gars (SWE)	Emma Samuelsson (SWE)	Caroline Piasecka (NOR); Johanna Bergdahl (SWE)
1 December 2012	Belgrade Trophy, Belgrade	Satellite	Maria Udrea (ROU)	Kata Mihály (HUN)	Avital Marinuk (ISR); Caitlin Chang (GBR)
12 January 2013	SAF Pokalen, Stockholm	Satellite	Kristina Kuusk (EST)	Irina Embrich (EST)	Katrina Lehis (EST); Alexandra Ndolo (GER)
19 January 2013	World Cup Qatar, Doha	World Cup	Xu Anqi (CHN)	Ana Maria Brânză (ROU)	Tiffany Géroudet (SUI); Lauren Rembi (FRA)
1 February 2013	Westend Grand Prix "in Memoriam Sákovics József", Budapest	World Cup	Yana Shemyakina (UKR)	Anna Sivkova (RUS)	Ana Maria Brânză (ROU); Joséphine Jacques-André-Coquin (FRA)
8 February 2013	Sparkassen-Weltcup, Leipzig	World Cup	Yana Zvereva (RUS)	Yin Mingfang (CHN)	Sun Yujie (CHN); Irina Embrich (EST)
1 March 2013	Challenge International de Saint-Maur, Saint-Maur-des-Fossés	World Cup	Ana Maria Brânză (ROU)	Emese Szász (HUN)	Irina Embrich (EST); Emma Samuelsson (SWE)
8 March 2013	Trofeu Internacional Ciutat de Barcelona, Barcelona	World Cup	Anna Sivkova (RUS)	Imke Duplitzer (GER)	Ana Maria Brânză (ROU); Lauren Rembi (FRA)
27 April 2013	Cole Cup, Newcastle	Satellite	Cáterin Bravo Aránguiz (CHI)	Caitlin Chang (GBR)	Alexandra Avena (ITA); Ayah Mahdy (EGY)
27 April 2013	Tournoi International, Xuzhou	World Cup	Choi In-jeong (KOR)	Ana Maria Brânză (ROU)	Bianca Del Carretto (ITA); Sun Yujie (CHN)
17 May 2013	Épée internationale, Rio de Janeiro	World Cup	Shin A-lam (KOR)	Britta Heidemann (GER)	Sun Yujie (CHN); Monika Sozanska (GER)
18 May 2013	Tournoi satellite, Split	World Cup	Julia Kirschen (GER)	Kata Mihály (HUN)	Pia Klafstad (NOR); Dóra Zavoda (HUN)
23 May 2013	Grand Prix, Havana	Grand Prix	Ana Maria Brânză (ROU)	Emese Szász (HUN)	Anna Sivkova (RUS); Tatyana Andryushina (RUS)
4 June 2013	Asian Championships, Shanghai	Zone	Xu Anqi (CHN)	Joanna Halls (AUS)	Sun Yujie (CHN); Yeung Chui Ling (HKG)
16 June 2013	European Championships, Zagreb	Zone	Ana Maria Brânză (ROU)	Francesca Quondamcarlo (ITA)	Emese Szász (HUN); Renata Knapik (POL)
18 June 2013	Pan American Championships, Cartagena	Zone	Courtney Hurley (USA)	Katherine Holmes (USA)	Kelley Hurley (USA); Cleia Guilhon (BRA)
26 June 2013	African Championships, Cape Town	Zone	Sarra Besbes (TUN)	Ayah Mahdy (EGY)	Ines Boubakri (TUN); Juliana Barrett (RSA)
26 June 2013	World Championships, Budapest	World	Julia Beljajeva (EST)	Anna Sivkova (RUS)	Emese Szász (HUN); Britta Heidemann (GER)

== Individual Foil ==
=== Top 10 ===
Men
1	(Italy) Andrea Cassarà	195
2	(United States) Gerek Meinhardt	195
3	(Russia) Artur Akhmatkhuzin	182
4	(Russia) Aleksey Cheremisinov	167
5	(United States) Miles Chamley-Watson	161
6	(Italy) Andrea Baldini	160
7	(United Kingdom) James-Andrew Davis	143
8	(Italy) Valerio Aspromonte	137
9	(United States) Alexander Massialas	120
10	(United States) Race Imboden	117

Women
1	(Italy) Arianna Errigo	242
2	(Russia) Inna Deriglazova	221
3	(Germany) Carolin Golubytskyi	201
4	(Italy) Elisa Di Francisca	188
5	(Russia) Larisa Korobeynikova	172
6	(Russia) Diana Yakovleva	153
7	(Italy) Carolina Erba	152
8	(United States) Nzingha Prescod	139
9	(France) Astrid Guyart	131
10	(France) Ysaora Thibus	122

=== Men's foil ===
Date	Event	Type	Gold	Silver	Bronze
10 November 2012	Tournoi satellite, Amsterdam	Satellite	Tomasz Ciepły (POL)	Rostyslav Hertsyk (UKR)	Andriy Pogrebnyak (UKR); Cedrik Serri (FRA)
2 December 2012	Leon Paul satellite fleuret masculin, London	Satellite	Daniele Garozzo (ITA)	Lorenzo Mazza (HUN)	Kyosuke Matsuyama (JPN); Nagashima Noriyuki (JPN)
25 January 2013	Challenge International de Paris, Paris	World Cup	Andrea Baldini (ITA)	Jérémy Cadot (FRA)	Giorgio Avola (ITA); Tao Jiale (CHN)
22 February 2013	Tournoi Ciudad de A Coruña, A Coruña	World Cup	Heo Jun (KOR)	Ryo Miyake (JPN)	Kim Min-kyu (USA); Cheung Siu Lun (HKG)
4 March 2013	Fleuret de Saint-Pétersbourg, Saint Petersburg	Grand Prix	James-Andrew Davis (GBR)	Alexander Massialas (USA)	Valerio Aspromonte (ITA); Artur Akhmatkhuzin (RUS)
16 March 2013	Coupe Ville de Venise, Venice	Grand Prix	Andrea Cassarà (ITA)	Gerek Meinhardt (USA)	Andrea Baldini (ITA); Peter Joppich (GER)
22 March 2013	Löwe von Bonn, Bonn	World Cup	Andrea Baldini (ITA)	Andrea Cassarà (ITA)	Aleksey Cheremisinov (RUS); Giorgio Avola (ITA)
26 April 2013	SK Trophée, Seoul	World Cup	Andrea Cassarà (ITA)	Erwann Le Péchoux (FRA)	Hua Li (CHN); Julien Mertine (FRA)
4 May 2013	Prince Takamado World Cup, Tokyo	Grand Prix	Aleksey Cheremisinov (RUS)	Gerek Meinhardt (USA)	Artur Akhmatkhuzin (RUS); Julien Mertine (FRA)
11 May 2013	Tournoi satellite, Copenhague	Satellite	Roland Schlosser (AUT)	David Alexander (IRL)	Evgeniy Filippov (RUS); Antonio Leal (VEN)
24 May 2013	Copa Villa La Habana, Havana	World Cup	Race Imboden (USA)	Giorgio Avola (ITA)	Kenta Chida (JPN); Aleksey Khovanskiy (RUS)
4 June 2013	Asian Championships, Shanghai	Zone	Heo Jun (KOR)	Ryo Miyake (JPN)	Kim Min-kyu (KOR); Cheung Siu Lun (HKG)
16 June 2013	European Championships, Zagreb	Zone	Peter Joppich (GER)	Aleksey Cheremisinov (RUS)	Andrea Baldini (ITA); James-Andrew Davis (GBR)
17 June 2013	Pan American Championships, Cartagena	Zone	Gerek Meinhardt (USA)	Race Imboden (USA)	Miles Chamley-Watson (USA); Maximilien Van Haaster (CAN)
27 June 2013	African Championships, Cape Town	Zone	Mohamed Ayoub Ferjani (TUN)	Mohamed Essam (EGY)	Mohamed Samandi (TUN); Tarek Ayad (EGY)
6 August 2013	World Championships, Budapest	World	Miles Chamley-Watson (USA)	Artur Akhmatkhuzin (RUS)	Valerio Aspromonte (ITA); Rostyslav Hertsyk (UKR)

=== Women's foil ===
Date	Event	Type	Gold	Silver	Bronze
1 February 2013	The Artus Court PKO BP, Gdańsk	Grand Prix	Arianna Errigo (ITA)	Astrid Guyart (FRA)	Elisa Di Francisca (ITA); Ilaria Salvatori (ITA)
8 February 2013	Coupe du monde, Budapest	World Cup	Inna Deriglazova (RUS)	Larisa Korobeynikova (RUS)	Arianna Errigo (ITA); Ysaora Thibus (FRA)
1 March 2013	Fleuret de Saint-Pétersbourg, Saint Petersburg	World Cup	Inna Deriglazova (RUS)	Larisa Korobeynikova (RUS)	Carolin Golubytskyi (GER); Ysaora Thibus (FRA)
8 March 2013	Reinhold-Würth-Cup, Tauberbischofsheim	World Cup	Inna Deriglazova (RUS)	Elisa Di Francisca (ITA)	Arianna Errigo (ITA); Aida Mohamed (HUN)
22 March 2013	Coupe du monde, Turin	World Cup	Arianna Errigo (ITA)	Yuliya Biryukova (RUS)	Astrid Guyart (FRA); Larisa Korobeynikova (RUS)
24 March 2013	Tournoi satellite, Copenhague	Satellite	Marta Cammilletti (ITA)	Ambre Civiero (SUI)	Delphine Groslambert (BEL); Liane Ye Ying Wong (SIN)
27 April 2013	SK Trophée, Seoul	Grand Prix	Inna Deriglazova (RUS)	Astrid Guyart (FRA)	Carolina Erba (ITA); Jeon Hee-sook (KOR)
3 May 2013	Coupe du monde, Shanghai	World Cup	Larisa Korobeynikova (RUS)	Diana Yakovleva (RUS)	Inna Deriglazova (RUS); Arianna Errigo (ITA)
24 May 2013	Challenge Jeanty, Marseille	Grand Prix	Nzingha Prescod (USA)	Carolin Golubytskyi (GER)	Carolina Erba (ITA); Corinne Maîtrejean (FRA)
4 June 2013	Asian Championships, Shanghai	Zone	Jeon Hee-sook (KOR)	Liu Yingshi (CHN)	Kim Mi-na (KOR); Jung Gil-ok (KOR)
16 June 2013	Pan American Championships, Cartagena	Zone	Lee Kiefer (USA)	Nzingha Prescod (USA)	Margaret Lu (USA); Alanna Goldie (CAN)
16 June 2013	European Championships, Zagreb	Zone	Elisa Di Francisca (ITA)	Diana Yakovleva (RUS)	Carolin Golubytskyi (GER); Ysaora Thibus (FRA)
25 June 2013	African Championships, Cape Town	Zone	Ines Boubakri (TUN)	Eman Gaber (EGY)	Anissa Khelfaoui (ALG); Noha Wasfy (EGY)
5 August 2013	World Championships, Budapest	World	Arianna Errigo (ITA)	Carolin Golubytskyi (GER)	Elisa Di Francisca (ITA); Inna Deriglazova (RUS)

== Individual Sabre ==
=== Top 10 ===
Men
1	(Russia) Veniamin Reshetnikov	200
2	(Hungary) Áron Szilágyi	184
3	(Romania) Tiberiu Dolniceanu	183
4	(Italy) Diego Occhiuzzi	170
5	(South Korea) Gu Bon-gil	167
6	(Russia) Nikolay Kovalev	158
7	(Germany) Benedikt Wagner	131
8	(Italy) Luigi Samele	131
9	(Italy) Enrico Berrè	120
10	(Belarus) Aliaksandr Buikevich	108

Women
1	(Ukraine) Olga Kharlan	302
2	(United States) Mariel Zagunis	246
3	(South Korea) Kim Ji-yeon	209
4	(Russia) Ekaterina Dyachenko	192
5	(Italy) Irene Vecchi	171
6	(Greece) Vassiliki Vougiouka	146
7	(Poland) Aleksandra Socha	145
8	(Russia) Dina Galiakbarova	131
9	(South Korea) Lee Ra-jin	116
10	(Russia) Yuliya Gavrilova	107

=== Men's sabre ===
Date	Event	Type	Gold	Silver	Bronze
20 October 2012	Tournoi satellite sabre masculin, Ghent	Satellite	Amedeo Giani (ITA)	Tamás Decsi (HUN)	Seppe Van Holsbeke (BEL); Riccardo Nuccio (ITA)
10 November 2012	Tournoi satellite sabre masculin, Amsterdam	Satellite	Seppe Van Holsbeke (BEL)	Alexander Crutchett (GBR)	Nikolai Nikolic (AUT); Fabrizio Marino (ITA)
19 January 2013	Glaive d'Asparoukh, Plovdiv	Grand Prix	Kamil Ibragimov (RUS)	Tiberiu Dolniceanu (ROU)	Luigi Samele (ITA); Benedikt Wagner (GER)
8 February 2013	Villa de Madrid, Madrid	World Cup	Fernando Casares (ESP)	Veniamin Reshetnikov (RUS)	Áron Szilágyi (HUN); Nicolas Limbach (GER)
15 February 2013	Trophée Luxardo, Padova	World Cup	Diego Occhiuzzi (ITA)	Veniamin Reshetnikov (RUS)	Riccardo Nuccio (ITA); Áron Szilágyi (ITA)
9 March 2013	Gerevich-Kovács-Kárpáti Grand Prix, Budapest	Grand Prix	Nicolas Limbach (GER)	Kim Kye-hwan (KOR)	Fernando Casares (ESP); Áron Szilágyi (HUN)
16 March 2013	Tournoi satellite sabre masculin, Helsinki	Satellite	Ricardo Alberto Bustamante (ARG)	Tamás Decsi (HUN)	Alexandre Woog (ISR); Daniel Sepulveda Romero (COL)
22 March 2013	Sabre de Moscou, Moscow	World Cup	Nikolay Kovalev (RUS)	Diego Occhiuzzi (ITA)	Maximilian Kindler (GER); Gu Bon-gil (KOR)
26 April 2013	Coupe Akropolis, Athens	World Cup	Áron Szilágyi (HUN)	Benedikt Wagner (GER)	Vincent Anstett (FRA); Gu Bon-gil (KOR)
27 April 2013	Cole Cup, Newcastle	Satellite	Soji Aiyenuro (GBR)	Alexander Crutchett (GBR)	Donald Simon (GBR); Henry Gann (GBR)
3 May 2013	Absolute Fencing Korfanty World Cup, Chicago	Grand Prix	Mátyás Szabó (HUN)	Áron Szilágyi (HUN)	Luigi Samele (ITA); Benedikt Wagner (GER)
12 May 2013	Tournoi satellite, Reykjavík	Satellite	Thomas Kolasa (USA)	Çağlayan Nehir Fırat (TUR)	İbrahim Ahmet Ant (TUR); Kristóf Puy (HUN)
18 May 2013	Sabre de Wołodyjowski, Warsaw	Grand Prix	Aliaksandr Buikevich (BLR)	Diego Occhiuzzi (ITA)	Gu Bon-gil (KOR); Benedikt Wagner (GER)
4 June 2013	Asian Championships, Shanghai	Zone	Gu Bon-gil (KOR)	Kim Jung-hwan (KOR)	Mojtaba Abedini (IRI); Oh Eun-seok (KOR)
16 June 2013	European Championships, Zagreb	Zone	Tiberiu Dolniceanu (ROU)	Aleksey Yakimenko (RUS)	Enrico Berrè (ITA); Nikolay Kovalev (RUS)
18 June 2013	Pan American Championships, Cartagena	Zone	Renzo Agresta (BRA)	Aleksander Ochocki (USA)	Daryl Homer (USA); Philippe Beaudry (CAN)
25 June 2013	African Championships, Cape Town	Zone	Hichem Samandi (TUN)	Ahmed Amr (EGY)	Ibrahim Keita (SEN); Ziad Elsissy (EGY)
5 August 2013	World Championships, Budapest	World	Veniamin Reshetnikov (RUS)	Nikolay Kovalev (RUS)	Tiberiu Dolniceanu (ROU); Áron Szilágyi (HUN)

=== Women's sabre ===
Date	Event	Type	Gold	Silver	Bronze
25 January 2013	Beazley Trophy, London	World Cup	Irene Vecchi (ITA)	Ekaterina Dyachenko (RUS)	Olha Kharlan (UKR); Aleksandra Socha (POL)
1 February 2013	Trophée BNP Paribas, Orléans	Grand Prix	Olha Kharlan (UKR)	Dina Galiakbarova (RUS)	Aleksandra Socha (POL); Mariel Zagunis (USA)
7 February 2013	Coupe du monde, Bologna	World Cup	Mariel Zagunis (USA)	Ibtihaj Muhammad (USA)	Ilaria Bianco (ITA); Yuliya Gavrilova (RUS)
15 March 2013	Tournoi International, Antalya	World Cup	Olha Kharlan (UKR)	Mariel Zagunis (USA)	Vassiliki Vougiouka (GRE); Kim Ji-yeon (KOR)
22 March 2013	Grand Prix, Moscow	Grand Prix	Olha Kharlan (UKR)	Sofiya Velikaya (RUS)	Vassiliki Vougiouka (GRE); Mariel Zagunis (USA)
27 April 2013	Cole Cup, Newcastle	World Cup	Thorbjörg Ágústsdóttir (ISL)	María Belén Pérez Maurice (ARG)	Marta Baeza Centurion (BRA); Alice Watson (GBR)
3 May 2013	Absolute Fencing Korfanty World Cup, Chicago	World Cup	Kim Ji-yeon (KOR)	Alina Komashchuk (UKR)	Yana Egorian (RUS); Dina Galiakbarova (RUS)
11 May 2013	Tournoi satellite, Reykjavík	Satellite	Anna Bashta (RUS)	María Belén Pérez Maurice (ARG)	Þorbjörg Ágústsdóttir (ISL); Shia Rodríguez (VEN)
25 May 2013	Coupe du monde, Tianjin	Grand Prix	Ekaterina Dyachenko (RUS)	Mariel Zagunis (USA)	Charlotte Lembach (FRA); Kim Ji-yeon (KOR)
4 June 2013	Asian Championships, Shanghai	Zone	Kim Ji-yeon (KOR)	Lee Ra-jin (KOR)	Shen Chen (CHN); Zhu Min (CHN)
16 June 2013	European Championships, Zagreb	Zone	Olha Kharlan (UKR)	Vassiliki Vougiouka (GRE)	Aleksandra Socha (POL); Irene Vecchi (ITA)
17 June 2013	Pan American Championships, Cartagena	Zone	Mariel Zagunis (USA)	Anne-Elizabeth Stone (USA)	Dagmara Wozniak (USA); Alejandra Benítez (VEN)
25 June 2013	African Championships, Cape Town	Zone	Azza Besbes (TUN)	Mennatalla Ahmed (EGY)	Mame Awa Ndao (SEN); Mariam El Sway (EGY)
5 August 2013	World Championships, Budapest	World	Olha Kharlan (UKR)	Ekaterina Dyachenko (RUS)	Kim Ji-yeon (KOR); Irene Vecchi (ITA)

== Team Épée ==
=== Top 10 ===
Men
1	Hungary	364
2	Switzerland	326
3	Venezuela	282
4	Italy	276
5	Ukraine	270
6	France	260
7	United States	237
8	China	199
9	Poland	195
10	Czech Republic	184

Women
1	China	424
2	Russia	342
3	Romania	280
4	Hungary	256
5	Ukraine	256
6	Estonia	254
7	Italy	226
8	United States	210
9	France	210
10	Sweden	189

=== Men's team épée ===
Date	Event	Gold	Silver	Bronze
27 January 2013	Coupe du Monde par équipes, Legnano	Switzerland	United States	Hungary
17 February 2013	Coupe du monde par équipes "Heidenheimer Pokal", Heidenheim an der Brenz	Italy	Hungary	China
17 March 2013	Coupe du Monde par équipes, Tallinn	France	Switzerland	Hungary
4 May 2013	Coupe du Monde par équipes-Trophée Monal, Paris	Italy	Venezuela	Hungary
26 May 2013	Coupe du Monde par équipes, Buenos Aires	Switzerland	Hungary	Venezuela
2 June 2013	Asian Championships, Shanghai	Kazakhstan	China	Korea
16 June 2013	European Championships, Zagreb	Switzerland	Hungary	Ukraine
19 June 2013	Pan American Championships, Cartagena	Venezuela	United States	Cuba
29 June 2012	African Championships, Cape Town	Egypt	Morocco	South Africa
11 August 2013	World Championships, Budapest	Hungary	Ukraine	France

=== Women's team épée ===
Date	Event	Gold	Silver	Bronze
21 January 2013	Coupe du Monde par équipes, Doha	China	Estonia	Ukraine
10 February 2013	Coupe du monde par équipes "Sparkassen-Weltcup", Leipzig	China	Hungary	Romania
3 March 2013	Coupe du Monde par équipes, Saint-Maur-des-Fossés	Russia	Hungary	Romania
10 March 2013	Coupe du Monde par équipes, Barcelona	China	Russia	Ukraine
19 May 2013	Coupe du Monde par équipes, Rio de Janeiro	China	Ukraine	Romania
4 June 2013	Asian Championships, Shanghai	China	Korea	Hong Kong
16 June 2013	European Championships, Zagreb	Estonia	Romania	Hungary
21 June 2013	Pan American Championships, Cartagena	United States	Brazil	Argentina
29 June 2013	African Championships, Cape Town	Tunisia	South Africa	Egypt
11 August 2013	World Championships, Budapest	Russia	China	Romania

== Team Foil ==
=== Top 10 ===
Men
1	United States	388
2	Italy	364
3	Russia	316
4	Germany	304
5	France	246
6	South Korea	220
7	China	215
8	Japan	202
9	Poland	202
10	United Kingdom	198

Women
1	Italy	448
2	France	352
3	Russia	304
4	South Korea	292
5	United States	234
6	Poland	219
7	China	211
8	Germany	210
9	Canada	208
10	Hungary	197

=== Men's team foil ===
Date	Event	Gold	Silver	Bronze
27 January 2013	Challenge International de Paris, Paris	United States	Germany	Russia
24 February 2014	Coupe du monde par équipes, A Coruña	Italy	United States	Russia
24 March 2014	Coupe du Monde par équipes-Löwe von Bonn, Bonn	China	Korea	Great Britain
27 April 2014	Coupe du Monde par équipes, Seoul	Russia	Germany	Italy
28 April 2014	Coupe du Monde par équipes, Havana	Italy	United States	France
4 June 2013	Asian Championships, Shanghai	Korea	Japan	China
16 June 2013	European Championships, Zagreb	Germany	Poland	Great Britain
20 June 2013	Pan American Championships, Cartagena	United States	Brazil	Canada
28 June 2013	African Championships, Cape Town	Egypt	Tunisia	South Africa
12 August 2013	World Championships, Budapest	Italy	United States	France

=== Women's team foil ===
Date	Event	Gold	Silver	Bronze
10 February 2013	Coupe du Monde par équipes, Budapest	Italy	France	Germany
3 March 2013	Coupe du monde par équipes, Saint Petersburg	Italy	Russia	France
10 March 2013	Coupe du Monde par équipes, Tauberbischofsheim	Italy	Russia	France
24 April 2013	Coupe du Monde par équipes, Turino	Italy	Russia	France
5 May 2014	Coupe du Monde par équipes, Shanghai	France	Korea	Italy
4 June 2013	Asian Championships, Shanghai	Korea	China	Japan
16 June 2013	European Championships, Zagreb	Italy	France	Hungary
19 June 2013	Pan American Championships, Cartagena	United States	Canada	Venezuela
29 June 2013	African Championships, Cape Town	Tunisia	Egypt	Senegal
11 August 2013	World Championships, Budapest	Italy	France	Russia

== Team Sabre ==
=== Top 10 ===
Men
1	Russia	344
2	Italy	324
3	Hungary	320
4	South Korea	294
5	Romania	274
6	Germany	262
7	United States	221
8	Ukraine	212
9	Belarus	204
10	China	202

Women
1	Ukraine	404
2	Russia	344
3	United States	328
4	Italy	280
5	South Korea	271
6	Poland	229
7	Hungary	218
8	China	210
9	France	199
10	Azerbaijan	194

=== Men's team sabre ===
Date	Event	Gold	Silver	Bronze
10 February 2013	Coupe du Monde par équipes, Madrid	Hungary	China	Romania
17 February 2013	Coupe du monde par équipes, Padova	Italy	Hungary	Korea
24 March 2013	Coupe du Monde par équipes, Moscow	Hungary	Russia	Korea
28 April 2013	Coupe du Monde par équipes, Athens	Germany	Italy	Russia
5 May 2013	Absolute Korfanty World Cup, Chicago	Russia	Italy	Korea
5 May 2014	Coupe du Monde par équipes, Shanghai	France	Korea	Italy
4 June 2013	Asian Championships, Shanghai	Korea	Iran	Kazakhstan
16 June 2013	European Championships, Zagreb	Italy	Hungary	Ukraine
21 June 2013	Pan American Championships, Cartagena	United States	Canada	Venezuela
28 June 2013	African Championships, Cape Town	Egypt	Tunisia	Senegal
10 August 2013	World Championships, Budapest	Russia	Romania	Korea

=== Women's team sabre ===
Date	Event	Gold	Silver	Bronze
27 January 2013	Corble Cup, London	Ukraine	Russia	Poland
24 February 2013	Coupe du monde par équipes, Ghent	Korea	Italy	United States
3 March 2013	Coupe du Monde par équipes, Bologna	Ukraine	Italy	United States
17 March 2013	Coupe du Monde par équipes, Antalya	Ukraine	Russia	United States
5 May 2013	Coupe du Monde par équipes, Chicago	United States	Hungary	Russia
4 June 2013	Asian Championships, Shanghai	Korea	China	Kazakhstan
16 June 2013	European Championships, Zagreb	Russia	Ukraine	Italy
20 June 2013	Pan American Championships, Cartagena	United States	Mexico	Canada
29 June 2013	African Championships, Cape Town	Tunisia	Egypt	South Africa
12 August 2013	World Championships, Budapest	Ukraine	Russia	United States
