= 2013 European Fencing Championships =

The 2013 European Fencing Championships was held in Zagreb, Croatia from 16–21 June 2013. Venue for the competition was Arena Zagreb.

== Schedule ==
●	Opening Ceremony	●	Finals	●	Closing Ceremony

June	16	17	18	19	20	21	Total
Ceremonies	●					●	
Foil Individual	Women	Men					2
Sabre Individual		Women		Men			2
Épée Individual	Men			Women			2
Foil Team			Women		Men		2
Sabre Team					Women	Men	2
Épée team			Men			Women	2
Total Gold Medals	2	2	2	2	2	2	12

== Medal summary ==
=== Men's events ===
Event	Gold	Silver	Bronze
Foil	Peter Joppich (GER)	Aleksey Cheremisinov (RUS)	Andrea Baldini (ITA); James-Andrew Davis (GBR)
Épée	Jörg Fiedler (GER)	Daniel Jerent (FRA)	Krzysztof Mikołajczak (POL); Ulrich Robeiri (FRA)
Sabre	Tiberiu Dolniceanu (ROU)	Aleksey Yakimenko (RUS)	Enrico Berrè (ITA); Nikolay Kovalev (RUS)
Team Foil	Germany; Sebastian Bachmann; Marius Braun; Johann Gustinelli; Peter Joppich	Poland; Radosław Glonek; Paweł Kawiecki; Michał Majewski; Leszek Rajski	Great Britain; Keith Cook; James-Andrew Davis; Richard Kruse; Marcus Mepstead
Team Épée	Switzerland; Max Heinzer; Fabian Kauter; Benjamin Steffen; Florian Staub	Hungary; Gábor Boczkó; Géza Imre; András Rédli; Péter Szényi	Ukraine; Anatoliy Herey; Dmytro Karyuchenko; Bohdan Nikishyn; Vitaly Medvedev
Team Sabre	Italy; Enrico Berrè; Aldo Montano; Diego Occhiuzzi; Luigi Samele	Hungary; Csaba Norbert Gáll; Csanád Gémesi; Nikolász Iliász; Áron Szilágyi	Ukraine; Dmytro Boiko; Dmytro Pundyk; Oleh Shturbabin; Andriy Yahodka

=== Women's events ===
Event	Gold	Silver	Bronze
Foil	Elisa Di Francisca (ITA)	Diana Yakovleva (RUS)	Carolin Golubytskyi (GER); Ysaora Thibus (FRA)
Épée	Ana Maria Brânză (ROU)	Francesca Quondamcarlo (ITA)	Emese Szász (HUN); Renata Knapik (POL)
Sabre	Olha Kharlan (UKR)	Vassiliki Vougiouka (GRE)	Aleksandra Socha (POL); Irene Vecchi (ITA)
Team Foil	Italy; Elisa Di Francisca; Benedetta Durando; Carolina Erba; Arianna Errigo	France; Astrid Guyart; Corinne Maîtrejean; Ysaora Thibus	Hungary; Edina Knapek; Aida Mohamed; Gabriella Varga
Team Épée	Estonia; Julia Beljajeva; Irina Embrich; Erika Kirpu; Kristina Kuusk	Romania; Ana Maria Brânză; Simona Pop; Amalia Tătăran; Maria Udrea	Hungary; Edina Antal; Dorina Budai; Julianna Révész; Emese Szász
Team Sabre	Russia; Yekaterina Dyachenko; Yana Egorian; Dina Galiakbarova; Yuliya Gavrilova	Ukraine; Olha Kharlan; Alina Komashchuk; Halyna Pundyk; Olena Voronina	Italy; Rossella Gregorio; Lucrezia Sinigaglia; Livia Stagni; Irene Vecchi

=== Medal table ===
Rank	Nation	Gold	Silver	Bronze	Total
1	Italy	3	1	4	8
2	Germany	3	0	1	4
3	Romania	2	1	0	3
4	Russia	1	3	1	5
5	Ukraine	1	1	2	4
6	Estonia	1	0	0	1
6	Switzerland	1	0	0	1
8	Hungary	0	2	3	5
9	France	0	2	2	4
10	Poland	0	1	3	4
11	Greece	0	1	0	1
12	Great Britain	0	0	2	2
Totals (12 entries)		12	12	18	42

== Results overview ==
=== Men ===
==== Foil individual ====
Position	Name	Country
1st place, gold medalist(s)	Peter Joppich	Germany
2nd place, silver medalist(s)	Aleksey Cheremisinov	Russia
3rd place, bronze medalist(s)	Andrea Baldini	Italy
3rd place, bronze medalist(s)	James-Andrew Davis	United Kingdom
5.	Aleksey Khovanskiy	Russia
6.	Richard Kruse	United Kingdom
7.	Valerio Aspromonte	Italy
8.	Siarhei Byk	Belarus

Quarter-finals
(Russia) Aleksey Cheremisinov	15
(Italy) Valerio Aspromonte	8
(Belarus) Siarhei Byk	13
(United Kingdom) James-Andrew Davis	15
(United Kingdom) Richard Kruse	12
(Germany) Peter Joppich	15
(Italy) Andrea Baldini	15
(Russia) Aleksey Khovanskiy	12

Semi-finals
(Russia) Aleksey Cheremisinov	15
(United Kingdom) James-Andrew Davis	8
(Germany) Peter Joppich	15
(Italy) Andrea Baldini	11

Final
(Russia) Aleksey Cheremisinov	11
(Germany) Peter Joppich	15

==== Épée individual ====
Position	Name	Country
1st place, gold medalist(s)	Jörg Fiedler	Germany
2nd place, silver medalist(s)	Daniel Jerent	France
3rd place, bronze medalist(s)	Krzysztof Mikołajczak	Poland
3rd place, bronze medalist(s)	Ulrich Robeiri	France
5.	Enrico Garozzo	Italy
6.	Benjamin Steffen	Switzerland
7.	András Rédli	Hungary
8.	Iván Trevejo	France

Quarter-finals
(Switzerland) Benjamin Steffen	4
(Germany) Jörg Fiedler	15
(Poland) Krzysztof Mikołajczak	15
(France) Iván Trevejo	13
(Hungary) András Rédli	8
(France) Ulrich Robeiri	9
(France) Daniel Jerent	15
(Italy) Enrico Garozzo	13

Semi-finals
(Germany) Jörg Fiedler	15
(Poland) Krzysztof Mikołajczak	12
(France) Ulrich Robeiri	4
(France) Daniel Jerent	15

Final
(Germany) Jörg Fiedler	15
(France) Daniel Jerent	5

==== Sabre individual ====
Position	Name	Country
1st place, gold medalist(s)	Tiberiu Dolniceanu	Romania
2nd place, silver medalist(s)	Aleksey Yakimenko	Russia
3rd place, bronze medalist(s)	Enrico Berrè	Italy
3rd place, bronze medalist(s)	Nikolay Kovalev	Russia
5.	Dmytro Boiko	Ukraine
6.	Veniamin Reshetnikov	Russia
7.	Ciprian Gălățanu	Romania
8.	Diego Occhiuzzi	Italy

Quarter-finals
(Russia) Aleksey Yakimenko	15
(Italy) Diego Occhiuzzi	13
(Italy) Enrico Berrè	15
(Ukraine) Dmytro Boiko	8
(Romania) Tiberiu Dolniceanu	15
(Romania) Ciprian Gălățanu	6
(Russia) Veniamin Reshetnikov	14
(Russia) Nikolay Kovalev	15

Semi-finals
(Russia) Aleksey Yakimenko	15
(Italy) Enrico Berrè	7
(Romania) Tiberiu Dolniceanu	15
(Russia) Nikolay Kovalev	8

Final
(Russia) Aleksey Yakimenko	11
(Romania) Tiberiu Dolniceanu	15

==== Foil team ====
Position	Name	Country
1st place, gold medalist(s)	Sebastian Bachmann; Marius Braun; Johann Gustinelli; Peter Joppich	Germany
2nd place, silver medalist(s)	Radosław Glonek; Paweł Kawiecki; Michał Majewski; Leszek Rajski	Poland
3rd place, bronze medalist(s)	Keith Cook; James-Andrew Davis; Richard Kruse; Marcus Mepstead	Great Britain
4.	Artur Akhmatkhuzin; Aleksey Cheremisinov; Aleksey Khovanskiy; Artem Sedov	Russia
5.	Jérémy Cadot; Erwann Le Péchoux; Marcel Marcilloux; Julien Mertine	France
6.	Alexander Choupenitch; Jan Krejčík; Václav Kundera; Jiří Kurfurst	Czech Republic
7.	Valerio Aspromonte; Giorgio Avola; Andrea Baldini; Andrea Cassarà	Italy
8.	Lorenzo Mazza; Gábor Szabados; Kristóf Szabados; Bence Széki	Hungary

Quarter-finals
Italy	40
Poland	45
Great Britain	45
France	37
Germany	45
Hungary	37
Czech Republic	30
Russia	45

Semi-finals
Poland	45
Great Britain	43
Germany	45
Russia	39

Final
Poland	34
Germany	45
Third place
Great Britain	45
Russia	33

==== Épée team ====
Position	Name	Country
1st place, gold medalist(s)	Max Heinzer; Fabian Kauter; Benjamin Steffen	Switzerland
2nd place, silver medalist(s)	Gábor Boczkó; Géza Imre; András Rédli	Hungary
3rd place, bronze medalist(s)	Anatoliy Herey; Vitali Medvediev; Bohdan Nikishyn	Ukraine
4.	Alexandre Blaszyck; Daniel Jerent; Ulrich Robeiri; Iván Trevejo	France
5.	Diego Confalonieri; Enrico Garozzo; Paolo Pizzo; Matteo Tagliariol	Italy
6.	Michał Adamek; Krzysztof Mikołajczak; Tomasz Motyka; Radosław Zawrotniak	Poland
7.	Sven Järve; Nikolai Novosjolov; Sten Priinits; Jüri Salm	Estonia
8.	Jakub Ambroz; Jiri Beran; Martin Capek; Richard Pokorny	Czech Republic

Quarter-finals
Switzerland	33
Poland	26
Czech Republic	33
France	45
Italy	36
Ukraine	45
Estonia	37
Hungary	45

Semi-finals
Switzerland	19
France	18
Ukraine	32
Hungary	38

Final
Switzerland	43
Hungary	36
Third place
France	24
Ukraine	41

==== Sabre team ====
Position	Name	Country
1st place, gold medalist(s)	Enrico Berrè; Aldo Montano; Diego Occhiuzzi; Luigi Samele	Italy
2nd place, silver medalist(s)	Csaba Norbert Gáll; Csanád Gémesi; Nikolász Iliász; Áron Szilágyi	Hungary
3rd place, bronze medalist(s)	Dmytro Boiko; Dmytro Pundyk; Oleh Shturbabin; Andriy Yahodka	Ukraine
4.	Alin Badea; Mădălin Bucur; Tiberiu Dolniceanu; Ciprian Gălățanu	Romania
5.	Max Hartung; Richard Hübers; Matyas Szabo; Benedikt Wagner	Germany
6.	Vincent Anstett; Boladé Apithy; Julien Médard; Nicolas Rousset	France
7.	Kamil Ibragimov; Nikolay Kovalev; Veniamin Reshetnikov; Aleksey Yakimenko	Russia
8.	Beka Bazadze; Sandro Bazadze; Mikheil Mardaleishvili	Georgia

Quarter-finals
Russia	44
Ukraine	45
Hungary	45
Germany	42
Romania	45
Georgia	27
France	43
Italy	45

Semi-finals
Ukraine	37
Hungary	45
Romania	33
Italy	45

Final
Hungary	40
Italy	45
Third place
Ukraine	45
Romania	36

=== Women ===
==== Foil individual ====
Position	Name	Country
1st place, gold medalist(s)	Elisa Di Francisca	Italy
2nd place, silver medalist(s)	Diana Yakovleva	Russia
3rd place, bronze medalist(s)	Carolin Golubytskyi	Germany
3rd place, bronze medalist(s)	Ysaora Thibus	France
5.	Arianna Errigo	Italy
6.	Carolina Erba	Italy
7.	Benedetta Durando	Italy
8.	Edina Knapek	Hungary

Quarter-finals
(Italy) Arianna Errigo	5
(Italy) Elisa Di Francisca	15
(Italy) Benedetta Durando	7
(France) Ysaora Thibus	15
(Russia) Diana Yakovleva	15
(Hungary) Edina Knapek	9
(Germany) Carolin Golubytskyi	12
(Italy) Carolina Erba	11

Semi-finals
(Italy) Elisa Di Francisca	15
(France) Ysaora Thibus	12
(Russia) Diana Yakovleva	13
(Germany) Carolin Golubytskyi	12

Final
(Italy) Elisa Di Francisca	15
(Russia) Diana Yakovleva	7

==== Épée individual ====
Position	Name	Country
1st place, gold medalist(s)	Ana Maria Brânză	Romania
2nd place, silver medalist(s)	Francesca Quondamcarlo	Italy
3rd place, bronze medalist(s)	Emese Szász	Hungary
3rd place, bronze medalist(s)	Renata Knapik	Poland
5.	Rossella Fiamingo	Italy
6.	Anfisa Pochkalova	Ukraine
7.	Romana Caran	Serbia
8.	Irina Embrich	Estonia

Quarter-finals
(Poland) Renata Knapik	15
(Ukraine) Anfisa Pochkalova	10
(Romania) Ana Maria Brânză	15
(Italy) Rossella Fiamingo	9
(Hungary) Emese Szász	15
(Estonia) Irina Embrich	10
(Italy) Francesca Quondamcarlo	15
(Serbia) Romana Caran	13

Semi-finals
(Poland) Renata Knapik	9
(Romania) Ana Maria Brânză	15
(Hungary) Emese Szász	8
(Italy) Francesca Quondamcarlo	15

Final
(Romania) Ana Maria Brânză	15
(Italy) Francesca Quondamcarlo	11

==== Sabre individual ====
Position	Name	Country
1st place, gold medalist(s)	Olha Kharlan	Ukraine
2nd place, silver medalist(s)	Vassiliki Vougiouka	Greece
3rd place, bronze medalist(s)	Aleksandra Socha	Poland
3rd place, bronze medalist(s)	Irene Vecchi	Italy
5.	Araceli Navarro	Spain
6.	Anna Márton	Hungary
7.	Cécilia Berder	France
8.	Stefanie Kubissa	Germany

Quarter-finals
(France) Cécilia Berder	14
(Poland) Aleksandra Socha	15
(Hungary) Anna Márton	10
(Ukraine) Olha Kharlan	15
(Spain) Araceli Navarro	11
(Greece) Vassiliki Vougiouka	15
(Italy) Irene Vecchi	15
(Germany) Stefanie Kubissa	10

Semi-finals
(Poland) Aleksandra Socha	9
(Ukraine) Olha Kharlan	15
(Greece) Vassiliki Vougiouka	15
(Italy) Irene Vecchi	11

Final
(Ukraine) Olha Kharlan	15
(Greece) Vassiliki Vougiouka	7

==== Foil team ====
Position	Name	Country
1st place, gold medalist(s)	Elisa Di Francisca; Benedetta Durando; Carolina Erba; Arianna Errigo	Italy
2nd place, silver medalist(s)	Astrid Guyart; Corinne Maîtrejean; Ysaora Thibus	France
3rd place, bronze medalist(s)	Edina Knapek; Aida Mohamed; Gabriella Varga	Hungary
4.	Inna Deriglazova; Larisa Korobeynikova; Diana Yakovleva; Yuliya Biryukova	Russia
5.	Karolina Chlewińska; Hanna Lyczbinska; Martyna Synoradzka; Małgorzata Wojtkowiak	Poland
6.	Kateryna Chentsova; Olha Leleiko; Anastasiya Moskovska; Alexandra Sinyta	Ukraine
7.	Sandra Bingenheimer; Carolin Golubytskyi; Anne Sauer; Katja Wächter	Germany
8.	Reka Balogh; Maria Boldor; Mălina Călugăreanu; Isabelle Stan	Romania

Quarter-finals
Italy	45
Romania	21
Hungary	20
Poland	9
France	45
Germany	25
Ukraine	35
Russia	45

Semi-finals
Italy	45
Hungary	18
France	45
Russia	42

Final
Italy	45
France	30
Third place
Hungary	45
Russia	37

==== Épée team ====
Position	Name	Country
1st place, gold medalist(s)	Julia Beljajeva; Irina Embrich; Erika Kirpu; Kristina Kuusk	Estonia
2nd place, silver medalist(s)	Ana Maria Brânză; Simona Pop; Amalia Tătăran; Maria Udrea	Romania
3rd place, bronze medalist(s)	Edina Antal; Dorina Budai; Julianna Révész; Emese Szász	Hungary
4.	Bianca Del Carretto; Rossella Fiamingo; Francesca Quondamcarlo; Giulia Rizzi	Italy
5.	Dzhoan Bezhura; Olena Kryvytska; Kseniya Pantelyeyeva; Anfisa Pochkalova	Ukraine
6.	Tatyana Andryushina; Violetta Kolobova; Anna Sivkova; Yana Zvereva	Russia
7.	Kinka Barvestad; Johanna Bergdahl; Sanne Gars; Emma Samuelsson	Sweden
8.	Beate Christmann; Imke Duplitzer; Anja Schünke; Monika Sozanska	Germany

Quarter-finals
Russia	31
Estonia	32
Germany	25
Italy	30
Ukraine	31
Hungary	40
Sweden	43
Romania	44

Semi-finals
Estonia	44
Italy	39
Hungary	32
Romania	37

Final
Estonia	27
Romania	20
Third place
Italy	25
Hungary	28

==== Sabre team ====
Position	Name	Country
1st place, gold medalist(s)	Yekaterina Dyachenko; Yana Egorian; Dina Galiakbarova; Yuliya Gavrilova	Russia
2nd place, silver medalist(s)	Olha Kharlan; Alina Komashchuk; Halyna Pundyk; Olena Voronina	Ukraine
3rd place, bronze medalist(s)	Rossella Gregorio; Lucrezia Sinigaglia; Livia Stagni; Irene Vecchi	Italy
4.	Katarzyna Kedziora; Matylda Ostojska; Marta Puda; Aleksandra Socha	Poland
5.	Cécilia Berder; Saoussen Boudiaf; Béline Boulay; Charlotte Lembach	France
6.	Aida Alasgarova; Sevil Bunyatova; Sevinj Bunyatova; Sabina Mikina	Azerbaijan
7.	Alexandra Bujdoso; Sibylle Klemm; Stefanie Kubissa; Anna Limbach	Germany
8.	Réka Benkó; Anna Márton; Dora Varga; Anna Várhelyi	Hungary

Quarter-finals
Ukraine	45
Azerbaijan	38
Hungary	43
Poland	45
Italy	45
France	41
Germany	41
Russia	45

Semi-finals
Ukraine	45
Poland	41
Italy	35
Russia	45

Final
Ukraine	44
Russia	45
Third place
Poland	44
Italy	45
