= Fencing at the 2011 Summer Universiade =

Fencing was contested at the 2011 Summer Universiade from August 13 to August 18 at the No. 9 Hall in the Shenzhen Convention & Exhibition Center in Shenzhen, China. Men's and women's individual and team events were held in the épée, sabre, and foil categories.

== Medal summary ==
=== Medal table ===
* Host nation (China)

| Rank | Nation | Gold | Silver | Bronze | Total |
|---|---|---|---|---|---|
| 1 | Ukraine (UKR) | 3 | 2 | 1 | 6 |
| 2 | Russia (RUS) | 3 | 0 | 3 | 6 |
| 3 | France (FRA) | 2 | 2 | 1 | 5 |
| 4 | China (CHN)* | 2 | 1 | 2 | 5 |
| 5 | Italy (ITA) | 1 | 2 | 2 | 5 |
| 6 | Hungary (HUN) | 1 | 0 | 1 | 2 |
| 7 | South Korea (KOR) | 0 | 2 | 5 | 7 |
| 8 | Poland (POL) | 0 | 1 | 1 | 2 |
| 9 | Romania (ROU) | 0 | 1 | 0 | 1 |
| 9 | United States (USA) | 0 | 1 | 0 | 1 |
| 11 | Hong Kong (HKG) | 0 | 0 | 1 | 1 |
| 11 | Japan (JPN) | 0 | 0 | 1 | 1 |
| Totals (12 entries) | | 12 | 12 | 18 | 42 |

=== Events ===
==== Men's events ====
| Event | Gold | Silver | Bronze |
|---|---|---|---|
| Individual épée | Péter Szényi; Hungary | Virgile Marchal; France | Anatoliy Herey; Ukraine |
| Individual épée | Péter Szényi; Hungary | Virgile Marchal; France | Raffaello Marzani; Italy |
| Individual sabre | Andriy Yahodka; Ukraine | Gu Bon-gil; South Korea | Massimiliano Murolo; Italy |
| Individual sabre | Andriy Yahodka; Ukraine | Gu Bon-gil; South Korea | He Wei; China |
| Individual foil | Martino Minuto; Italy | Lei Sheng; China | Zhu Jun; China |
| Individual foil | Martino Minuto; Italy | Lei Sheng; China | Heo Jun; South Korea |
| Team épée | Russia (RUS); Nikita Glazkov; Sergey Khodos; Alexandr Velikanov; Vseslav Morgoyev | France (FRA); Alex Fava; Virgile Marchal; Adrien Penso-Tsai; Alexandre Bardenet | Hungary (HUN); Péter Szényi; Dániel Budai; Márk Hanczvikkel |
| Team sabre | Ukraine (UKR); Dmytro Boiko; Oleh Shturbabin; Andriy Yahodka; Dmytro Pundyk | Italy (ITA); Marco Tricarico; Massimiliano Murolo; Luigi Miracco; Stefano Sbragia | South Korea (KOR); Heo Young-gu; Gu Bon-gil; Hwang Byung-yul |
| Team foil | China (CHN); Lei Sheng; Huang Liangcai; Zhu Jun; Chen Min | Italy (ITA); Alessio Foconi; Tommaso Lari; Martino Minuto; Luca Simoncelli | Russia (RUS); Aleksey Khovanskiy; Igor Zapozdaev; Artur Akhmatkhuzin; Dmitry Komissarov |

==== Women's events ====
| Event | Gold | Silver | Bronze |
|---|---|---|---|
| Individual épée | Lauren Rembi; France | Olena Kryvytska; Ukraine | Ayaka Shimookawa; Japan |
| Individual épée | Lauren Rembi; France | Olena Kryvytska; Ukraine | Shin A-lam; South Korea |
| Individual sabre | Olha Kharlan; Ukraine | Bianca Pascu; Romania | Kim Ji-yeon; South Korea |
| Individual sabre | Olha Kharlan; Ukraine | Bianca Pascu; Romania | Au Yeung Wai Sum; Hong Kong |
| Individual foil | Kamilla Gafurzianova; Russia | Jeon Hee-sook; South Korea | Katarzyna Kryczalo; Poland |
| Individual foil | Kamilla Gafurzianova; Russia | Jeon Hee-sook; South Korea | Yuliya Biryukova; Russia |
| Team épée | France (FRA); Melissa Goram; Lauren Rembi; Marie-Gabrielle Fayolle; Mathilde Grumier | United States (USA); Courtney Hurley; Kelley Hurley; Susannah Scanlan; Holly Buechel | Russia (RUS); Vlada Vlasova; Elena Shasharina; Tatiana Andryushina; Maya Guchmazova |
| Team sabre | China (CHN); Chen Xiaodong; Xia Min; Li Fei; Yuan Tingting | Ukraine (UKR); Alina Komashchuk; Olena Khomrova; Olha Kharlan; Halyna Pundyk | South Korea (KOR); Choi Soo-yeon; Kim Ji-yeon; Lee Ra-jin |
| Team foil | Russia (RUS); Viktoria Kozyreva; Yuliya Biryukova; Kamilla Gafurzianova; Yulia Rashidova | Poland (POL); Hanna Lyczbinska; Marta Lyczbinska; Katarzyna Kryczalo; Karolina Chlewińska | France (FRA); Bérangère Genevois; Maëva Roulin; Ysaora Thibus; Clarisse Luminet |
