= Sinigaglia =

Sinigaglia is an alternative spelling of Senigallia, a comune and port town in Italy. It is also an Italian surname that may refer to

- Davide Sinigaglia (born 1981), Italian association football player
- Giuseppe Sinigaglia (1884–1916), Italian rower
  - Stadio Giuseppe Sinigaglia in Italy named after Giuseppe Sinigaglia
- Leone Sinigaglia (1868–1944), Italian composer and mountaineer
- Lucrezia Sinigaglia (born 1990), Italian sabre fencer
- Marco Sinigaglia (born 1968), Italian former football midfielder
- María Alicia Sinigaglia (born 1964), Argentinian fencer
- Oscar Sinigaglia, Italian engineer and industrialist
