= Fencing at 2013 World Combat Games – Women's Foil Individual =

The Women's Foil event of the 2013 World Combat Games was held in Saint Petersburg, Russia on 24 October.

== Medalists ==
Gold	Silver	Bronze
Carolina Erba (ITA)	Inna Deriglazova (RUS)	Carolin Golubytskyi (GER)

== Athlete List ==
- (Canada) Alanna Goldie
- (China) Liu Yongshi
- (Germany) Carolin Golubytskyi
- (France) Ysaora Thibus
- (France) Astrid Guyart
- (Egypt) Eman Gaber
- (Italy) Carolina Erba
- (Italy) Arianna Errigo
- (Hungary) Aida Mohamed
- (Hungary) Edina Knapek
- (South Korea) Jung Gil-ok
- (South Korea) Jeon Hee-sook
- (Poland) Martyna Synoradzka
- (Russia) Larisa Korobeynikova
- (Russia) Inna Deriglazova
- (Tunisia) Inès Boubakri

== Results ==
Round of 16
(Russia) Inna Deriglazova	15
(Canada) Alanna Goldie	10
(South Korea) Jung Gil-ok	8
(France) Ysaora Thibus	15
(France) Astrid Guyart	15
(Hungary) Aida Mohamed	10
(Hungary) Edina Knapek	6
(Germany) Carolin Golubytskyi	15
(Russia) Larisa Korobeynikova	15
(Poland) Martyna Synoradzka	3
(China) Liu Yongshi	8
(Italy) Carolina Erba	15
(South Korea) Jeon Hee-sook	15
(Tunisia) Inès Boubakri	6
(Egypt) Eman Gaber	8
(Italy) Arianna Errigo	15

Quarterfinals
(Russia) Inna Deriglazova	15
(France) Ysaora Thibus	7
(France) Astrid Guyart	5
(Germany) Carolin Golubytskyi	15
(Russia) Larisa Korobeynikova	11
(Italy) Carolina Erba	14
(South Korea) Jeon Hee-sook	15
(Italy) Arianna Errigo	14

Semifinals
(Russia) Inna Deriglazova	15
(Germany) Carolin Golubytskyi	6
(Italy) Carolina Erba	12
(South Korea) Jeon Hee-sook	11

Final
(Italy) Carolina Erba	13
(Russia) Inna Deriglazova	12

Third place
(Germany) Carolin Golubytskyi	14
(South Korea) Jeon Hee-sook	9
