= Alexandre Blaszyck =

French fencer

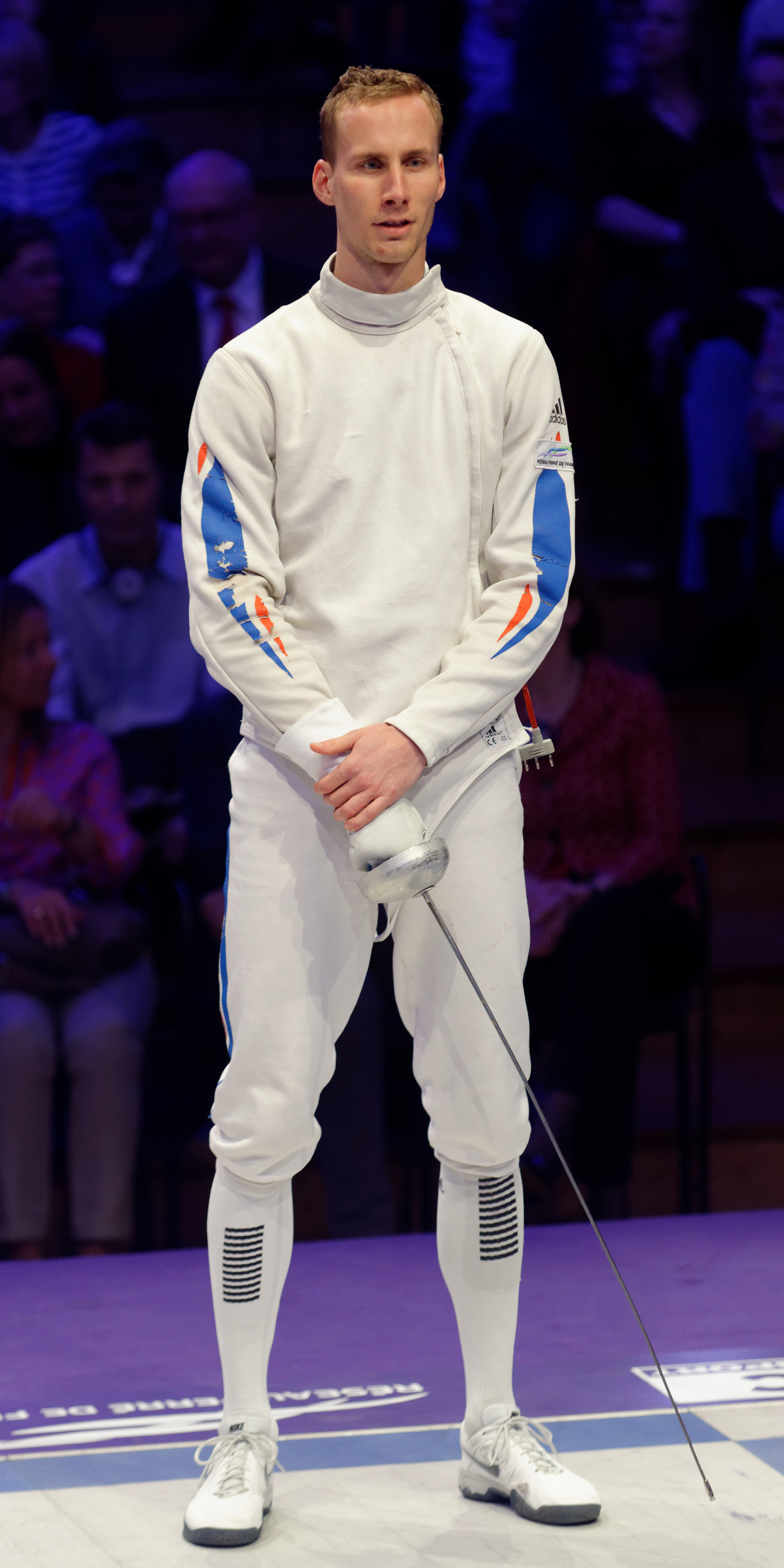

Personal information
- Born: 8 January 1988 (age 38)
- Height: 1.97 m (6 ft 6 in)

Fencing career
- Sport: Fencing
- Weapon: Épée
- Hand: right-handed
- Club: INSEP/Saint-Maur VGA
- FIE ranking: current ranking
Medal record
Men's épée fencing
Representing France
World Championships
Bronze medal – third place	2013 Budapest	Team épée
Universiade
Gold medal – first place	2013 Kazan	Team épée

Alexandre Blaszyck (born 8 January 1988) is a French épée fencer and team bronze medallist at the 2013 World Fencing Championships.

== Career ==
Blaszyck discovered fencing at school and took up the sport at his local club, VGA Saint-Maur, with maestro Hervé Faget, then Siegfried Robin and Stéphane Riboud. After a silver medal in the French national championships for his age group he was selected into the national training programme for promising young athletes ("Pôle Espoirs") in Reims. A year after, in 2006, he earned a bronze medal at the Junior European Championships in Poznań. He won in 2007 the Junior World Championships in Belek as well as the Junior World Cup series. This result had him selected into INSEP, a state-sponsored institution for high-performance athletes.

In the senior category Blaszyck won in 2010 the French national championship after defeating World no.5 Gauthier Grumier in the final. He also won the team event with the Levallois Sporting Club. In the 2012–13 season he climbed his first World Cup podium with a bronze medal at the Qatar Grand Prix in Doha. He reached the final in the Trophée Monal at home in Paris. After leading 14–13 against fellow Frenchman Daniel Jerent, he struck a hit that was later annulled for technical reasons, then lost the match. These two results caused Blaszyck to be was selected for the team event of the Zagreb European Championships. France were defeated by a single hit by Switzerland in the semifinal, then lost to Ukraine and finished fourth. In July he earned a team gold medal at the 2013 Summer Universiade in Kazan. A few weeks later, at the 2013 World Championships, his first participation to the competition, he was eliminated in the second round by Poland's Radosław Zawrotniak. In the team event France lost to Ukraine in the semifinals, but prevailed over Poland to win a bronze medal. Blaszyck finished the season World no.12, his best ranking as of 2015.

Blaszyck then went through a dry period, plunging to the 9th rank in 2013. French national coach Hugues Obry demanded more regularity from him and excluded him from team training camps, forcing him to train on his own. He bounced back in the 2014–15 season by winning the Trophée Monal over Hungary's Gábor Boczkó.
