= Vitaly Medvedev (fencer) =

Ukrainian fencer (born 1983)

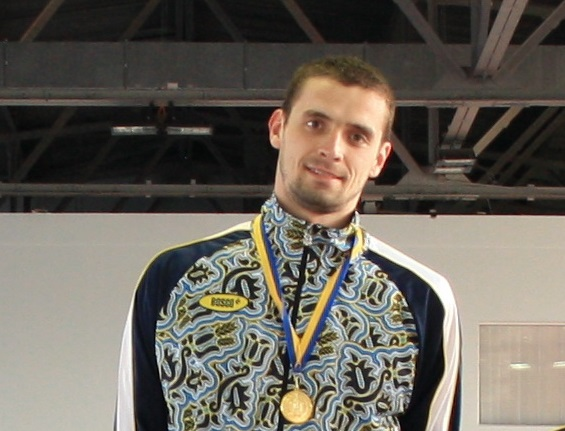

Personal information
- Full name: Vitaly Mikhailovich Medvedev
- Born: 7 May 1983 (age 43) Chirchiq, Uzbek SSR, Soviet Union
- Height: 1.99 m (6 ft 6 in)
- Weight: 90 kg (200 lb)

Sport
- Sport: Fencing
- Club: ZSU Kyiv
Medal record
Representing Ukraine
World Fencing Championships
Silver medal – second place	2013 Budapest	Épée team
European Fencing Championships
Bronze medal – third place	2013 Zagreb	Épée team
Summer Universiade
Gold medal – first place	2007 Bangkok	Team
Bronze medal – third place	2009 Belgrade	Team

Vitaly Mikhailovich Medvedev (Ukrainian: Вiталiй Михайлович Медведєв, born 7 May 1983) is a fencer who specializes in the épée. He was born in the Uzbek SSR, Soviet Union. His family then moved to the Lithuanian SSR, and in 1990 to Crimea, Ukrainian SSR, where he started fencing at the age of 11.He competed at the 2008 Summer Olympics and finished in seventh place with the Ukrainian team. In 2013, he won a silver and a bronze medal in the team épée at the world and European championships, respectively.

His parents are former basketball players. His mother, Emilia Kudusovna Medvedeva, worked as a teacher.
