= Halyna Pundyk =

Ukrainian fencer (born 1987)

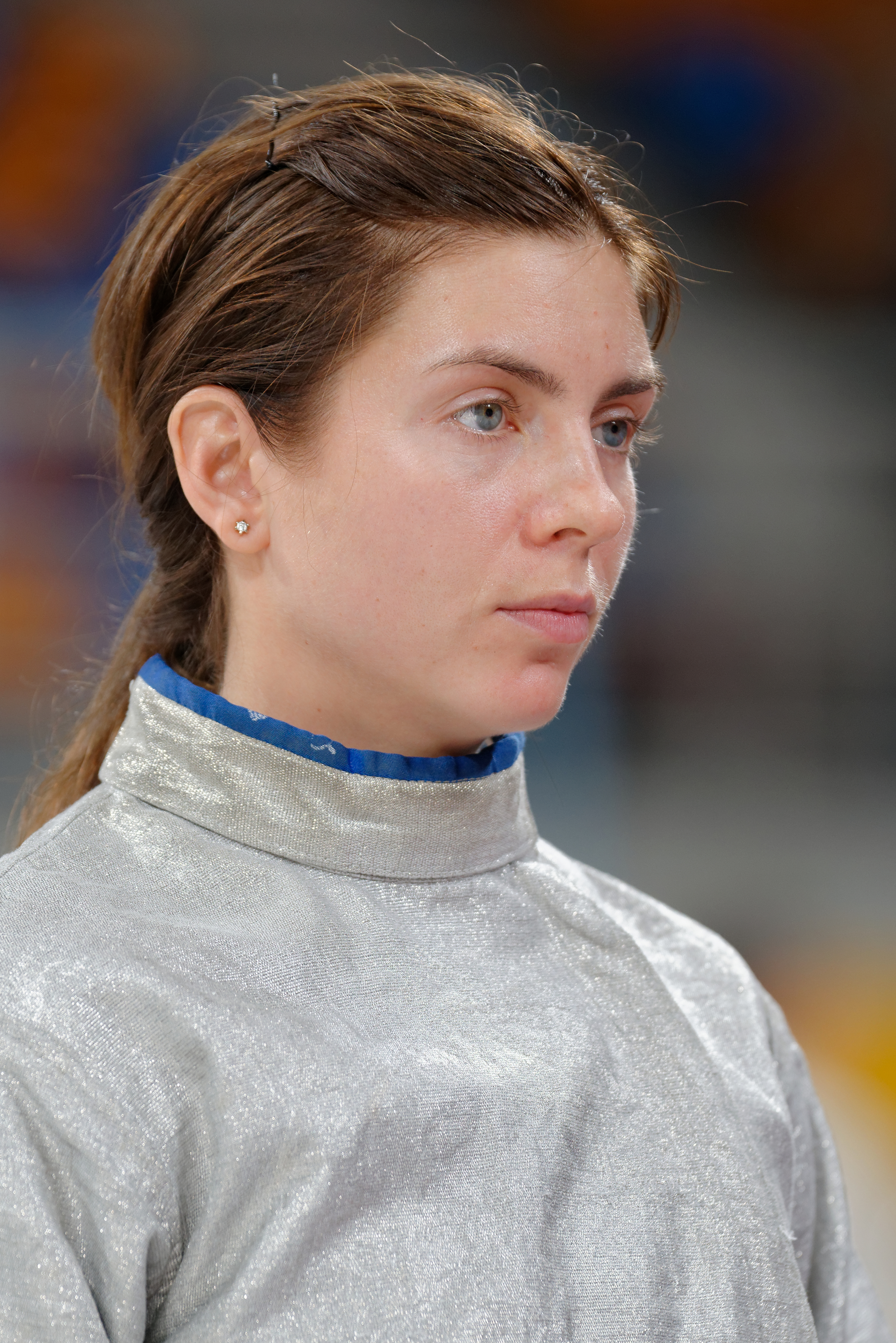

Personal information
- Native name: Галина Пундик
- Born: November 7, 1987 (age 38) Chotyrboky, Ukrainian SSR, Soviet Union
- Height: 1.63 m (5 ft 4 in)
- Weight: 54 kg (119 lb)

Fencing career
- Sport: Fencing
- Weapon: sabre
- Hand: right-handed
- National coach: Artem Skorokhod
- Club: CSKA
- Head coach: Valery Shturbabin
- FIE ranking: current ranking
Medal record
Women's sabre
Representing Ukraine
Olympic Games
Gold medal – first place	2008 Beijing	Team sabre
World Championships
Gold medal – first place	2009 Antalya	Team sabre
Gold medal – first place	2013 Budapest	Team sabre
Silver medal – second place	2007 Saint Petersburg	Team
Silver medal – second place	2010 Paris	Team sabre
Silver medal – second place	2011 Catania	Team Sabre
Silver medal – second place	2012 Kyiv	Team sabre
European Championships
Gold medal – first place	2009 Plovdiv	Team sabre
Gold medal – first place	2010 Leipzig	Team sabre
Silver medal – second place	2008 Kyiv	Team sabre
Silver medal – second place	2011 Sheffield	Team sabre
Silver medal – second place	2012 Legnano	Team Sabre
Silver medal – second place	2013 Zagreb	Team Sabre
Bronze medal – third place	2005 Zalaegerszeg	Team sabre
Bronze medal – third place	2007 Gand	Sabre
Bronze medal – third place	2009 Plovdiv	Sabre
Bronze medal – third place	2011 Sheffield	Sabre
Bronze medal – third place	2014 Strasbourg	Team Sabre
Summer Universiade
Silver medal – second place	2007 Bangkok	Individual
Silver medal – second place	2007 Bangkok	Team
Silver medal – second place	2011 Shenzhen	Team sabre
Bronze medal – third place	2013 Kazan	Sabre

Halyna Vasylivna Pundyk (Ukrainian: Галина Василівна Пундик; born November 7, 1987) is a Ukrainian gold medallist in sabre fencing. She was a member of the team that won the gold medal in sabre at the 2008 Summer Olympics.

The Ukrainian women's team won gold in the sabre final, beating Russia during the 2009 and 2010 European Fencing Championships. At the 2009 World Fencing Championships Pundyk and her teammates beat France to win gold. The team won the title "Team of the Year" at the (Ukrainian) "Sports Heroes of the Year 2009" ceremony in April 2010.

Halyna's brother, Dmytro, is also a high-performance fencer.
