= Fencing at the 2007 Summer Universiade =

The fencing competition in the 2007 Summer Universiade was held in Bangkok, Thailand.

== Medal overview ==
=== Men's events ===
Event	Gold	Silver	Bronze
Individual épée	András Rédli (HUN)	Dong Guotao (CHN)	Maksym Khvorost (UKR)
Individual épée	András Rédli (HUN)	Dong Guotao (CHN)	Dmitriy Gryaznov (KAZ)
Individual foil	Wu Hanxiong (CHN)	Bao Xiaoqing (CHN)	Maxim Petrov (UKR)
Individual foil	Wu Hanxiong (CHN)	Bao Xiaoqing (CHN)	Laurence Halsted (GBR)
Individual sabre	Aleksey Yakimenko (RUS)	Balázs Lontay (HUN)	Kim Jung-Hwan (KOR)
Individual sabre	Aleksey Yakimenko (RUS)	Balázs Lontay (HUN)	Veniamin Reshetnikov (RUS)
Team épée	Ukraine (UKR); Maksym Khvorost; Dmytro Karyuchenko; Vitaly Medvedev; Oleh Sokolov	France (FRA)	Switzerland (SUI)
Team foil	Russia (RUS)	China (CHN)	France (FRA)
Team sabre	Ukraine (UKR); Dmytro Boiko; Oleksandr Torchuk; Oleh Shturbabin; Andriy Yahodka	South Korea (KOR)	Russia (RUS)

=== Women's events ===
Event	Gold	Silver	Bronze
Individual épée	Yana Shemyakina (UKR)	Noam Mills (ISR)	Tan Li (CHN)
Individual épée	Yana Shemyakina (UKR)	Noam Mills (ISR)	Malgorzata Bereza (POL)
Individual foil	Yuliya Biryukova (RUS)	Lee Hye-Sun (KOR)	Liu Yuan (CHN)
Individual foil	Yuliya Biryukova (RUS)	Lee Hye-Sun (KOR)	Polina Repina (RUS)
Individual sabre	Lee Shin-Mi (KOR)	Halyna Pundyk (UKR)	Guo Fei (CHN)
Individual sabre	Lee Shin-Mi (KOR)	Halyna Pundyk (UKR)	An Mi-Ae (KOR)
Team épée	Ukraine (UKR); Yana Shemyakina; Olena Kryvytska; Olha Partala; Olena Reizlina	Romania (ROM)	China (CHN)
Team foil	China (CHN)	South Korea (KOR)	Japan (JPN)
Team sabre	South Korea (KOR)	Ukraine (UKR); Halyna Pundyk; Olha Zhovnir; Nina Kozlova; Olena Khomrova	Russia (RUS)

== Medal table ==
Rank	Nation	Gold	Silver	Bronze	Total
1	Ukraine (UKR)	4	2	2	8
2	Russia (RUS)	3	0	4	7
3	China (CHN)	2	3	4	9
4	South Korea (KOR)	2	3	2	7
5	Hungary (HUN)	1	1	0	2
6	France (FRA)	0	1	1	2
7	Israel (ISR)	0	1	0	1
7	Romania (ROM)	0	1	0	1
9	Great Britain (GBR)	0	0	1	1
9	Japan (JPN)	0	0	1	1
9	Kazakhstan (KAZ)	0	0	1	1
9	Poland (POL)	0	0	1	1
9	Switzerland (SUI)	0	0	1	1
Totals (13 entries)		12	12	18	42
