= Oleh Shturbabin =

Ukrainian fencer

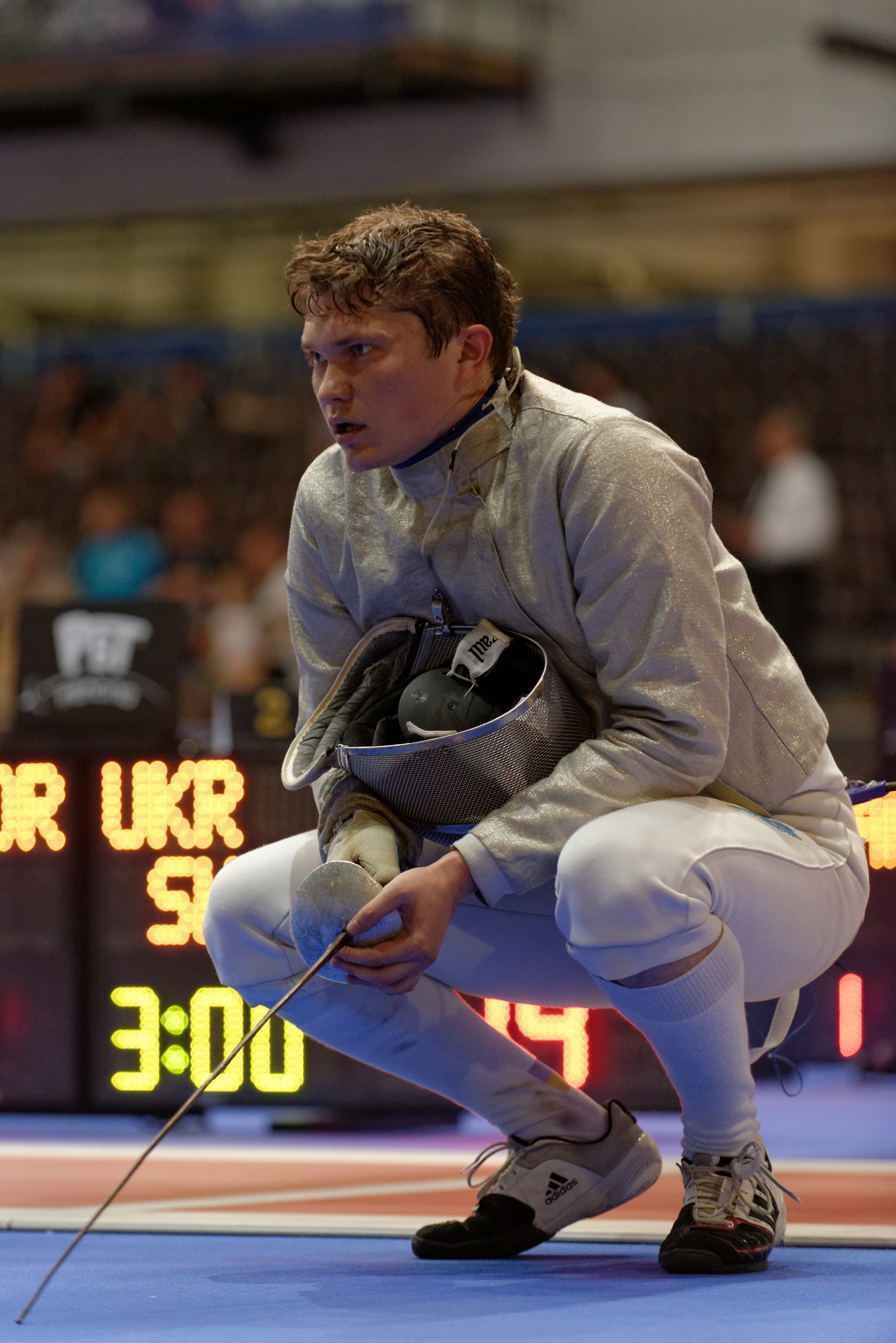
- At the 2013 World Fencing Championships

Personal information
- Full name: Oleh Valeriyovych Shturbabin
- Born: 22 July 1984 (age 41) Baku, Azerbaijan SSR, Soviet Union
- Home town: Netishyn, Ukraine
- Height: 1.8 m (5 ft 11 in)
- Weight: 72 kg (159 lb; 11.3 st)

Fencing career
- Sport: Fencing
- Country: Ukraine
- Weapon: sabre
- Hand: right-handed
- National coach: Valery Shturbabin
- FIE ranking: current ranking
Medal record
World Championships
Silver medal – second place	Turin 2006	Sabre Team
Bronze medal – third place	Havana 2003	Sabre Team
Bronze medal – third place	Leipzig 2005	Sabre
European Championships
Silver medal – second place	Leipzig 2010	Team Sabre
Bronze medal – third place	Leipzig 2010	Sabre
Bronze medal – third place	Zagreb 2013	Team sabre
Summer Universiade
Gold medal – first place	2007 Bangkok	Team
Gold medal – first place	2011 Shenzhen	Team
Silver medal – second place	2003 Daegu	Team
Silver medal – second place	2005 Izmir	Team

Oleh Shturbabin (in Ukrainian Олег Валерійович Штурбабін; born 22 July 1984) is a Ukrainian sabre fencer, bronze medallist in the 2005 World Fencing Championships and silver team medallist in the 2006 World Fencing Championships.

== Career ==
Shturbabin is the son of fencing coach Valery Shturbabin, who currently trains Ukraine's national sabre team. He took up fencing at the age of six. His first major award was a bronze medal at the 2001 Cadet World Championships in Gdańsk, followed by a team bronze medal at the Junior World Championships. He was offered a scholarship by an American college, but he refused as he did not want to move.

He competed at the 2004 Summer Olympics, finishing in sixth position in the sabre event. With Dmytro Boiko, Volodymyr Lukashenko and Vladyslav Tretiak, he won the silver medal in the sabre team event at the 2006 World Fencing Championships after losing to France in the final. At the 2010 European Fencing Championships he won the bronze medal in the Sabre individual event.

Shturbabin graduated from the Khmelnytskyi National University.
