= Dmytro Pundyk =

Ukrainian fencer

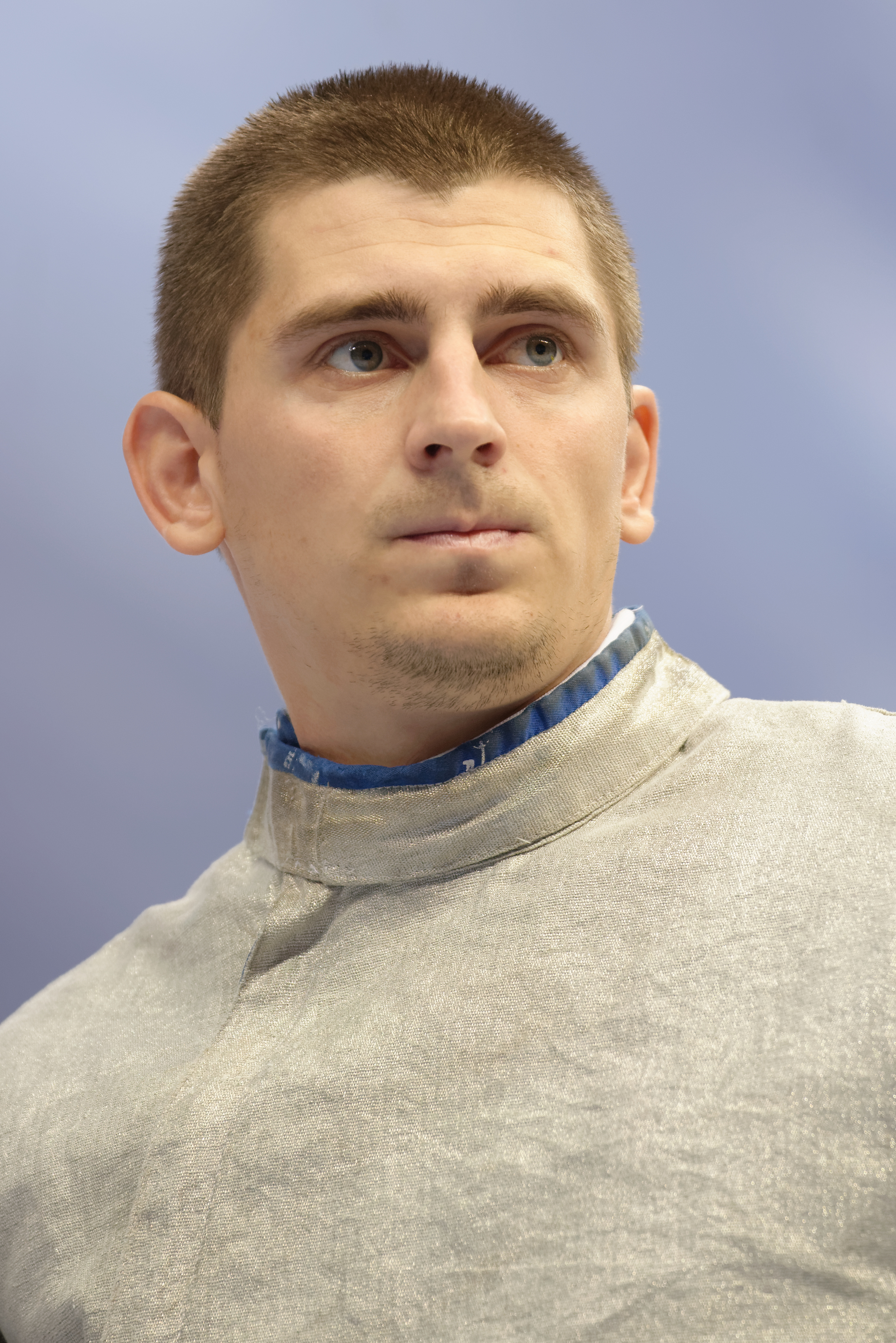

Personal information
- Born: 21 February 1989 (age 37) Tashkent, Uzbekistan
- Home town: Netishyn, Ukraine

Fencing career
- Sport: Fencing
- Weapon: sabre
- Hand: left-handed
- National coach: Valeriy Shturbabin
- FIE ranking: current ranking
Medal record
European Championships
Silver medal – second place	2010 Leipzig	Team
Bronze medal – third place	2013 Zagreb	Team
Universiade
Gold medal – first place	2011 Bangkok	Team

Dmytro Pundyk (Ukrainian: Дмитро Пундик; born 26 April 1992) is a Ukrainian sabre fencer, team silver medallist in the 2010 European Fencing Championships and team gold medallist at the 2011 Summer Universiade. He has been named master of sports, international class in Ukraine.

His older sister Halyna is also a sabre fencer, team gold medallist at the 2008 Summer Olympics. They took up fencing together as children.
