= Lucrezia Sinigaglia =

Italian fencer (born 1990)

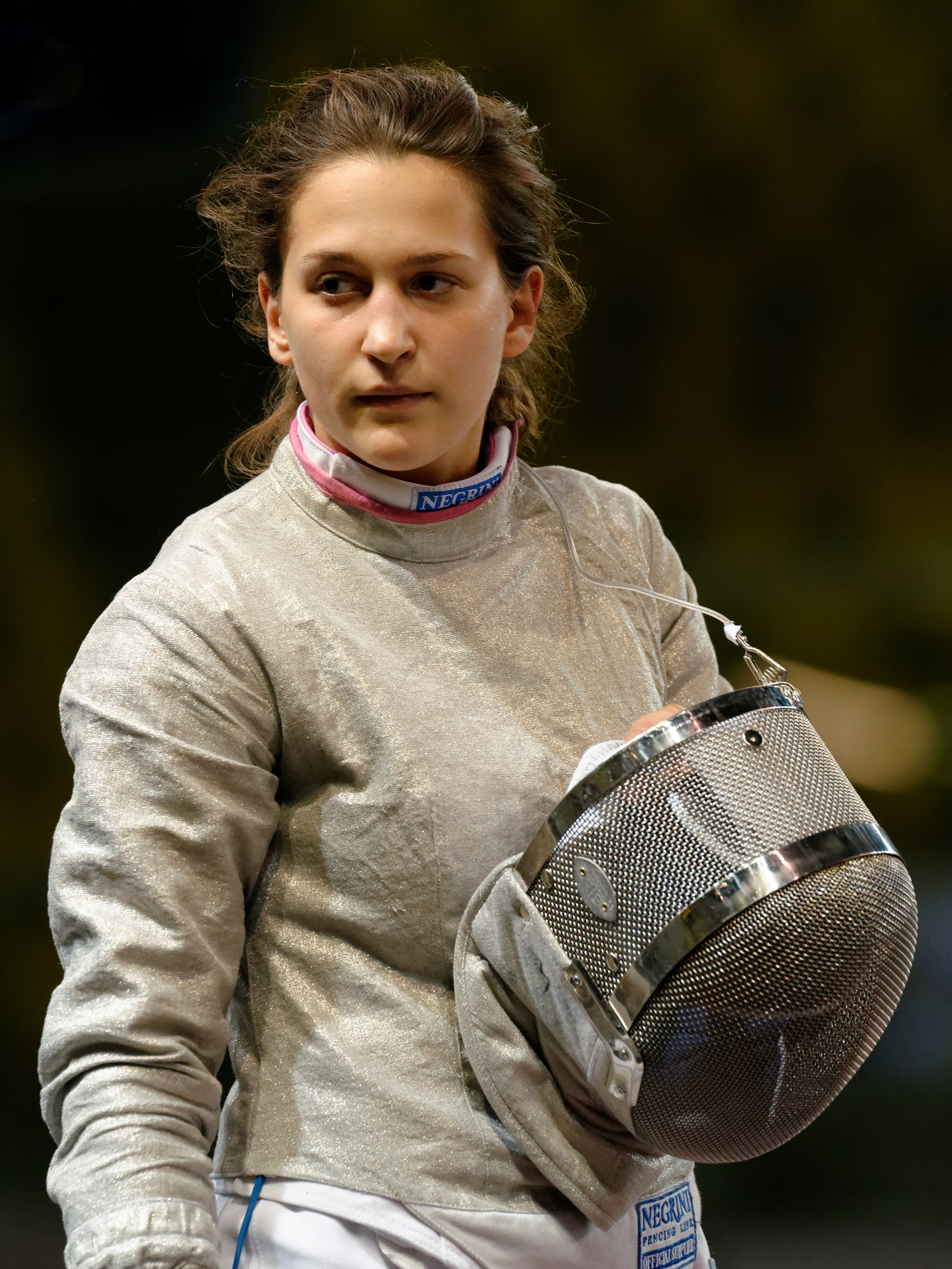
- At the 2014 European Fencing Championships

Personal information
- Born: 21 August 1990 (age 35) Padua, Veneto
- Height: 1.65 m (5 ft 5 in)
- Weight: 58 kg (128 lb; 9.1 st)

Fencing career
- Sport: Fencing
- Weapon: Sabre
- Hand: right-handed
- National coach: Giovanni Sirovich, Nicola Zanotti
- Club: GS Fiamme Gialle
- Head coach: Tommaso Dentico
- FIE ranking: current ranking
Medal record
Representing Italy
European Championships
Bronze medal – third place	2013 Zagreb	Team sabre

Lucrezia Sinigaglia (born 21 August 1990) is an Italian sabre fencer, team bronze medal in the 2013 European Championships at Zagreb.

== Career ==
Sinigaglia's first sport was swimming, but she never really took to it. She tried fencing at her father's suggestion when she was in her early tens. She first practiced at her local club in Abano Terme. When it closed, she joined Petrarca Scherma in Padova. She won the gold medal both in the individual and the team event at the 2007 Mediterranean Fencing Championships in Syracuse, Sicily and at the 2008 Junior European Championships in Amsterdam.

She joined the national sabre team in the 2012–13 season. She took part in the 2013 European Championships in the team event only. Italy defeated France, but fell against Russia in the semi-finals and fenced Poland in the small final. They prevailed 45–44 despite Poland's being in the lead for most of the match, and came away with a bronze medal.

In the 2013–14 season Sinigaglia reached her best individual result as of 2014 with a quarter-final in the Antalya World Cup. In the European Championships in Strasbourg, she was defeated in the table of 32 by World No.1 Olha Kharlan. In the team event, Italy were defeated in their first match by France and finished sixth. In the World Championships in Kazan, Sinigaglia created an upset in the table of 64 by eliminating reigning Olympic champion Kim Ji-yeon, but yielded to Japan's Mika Kikuchi in the next round. In the team event, Italy stumbled against France in the semi-final. They were overcome by Ukraine in the match for the bronze medal and finished fourth.
