= Francesca Quondamcarlo =

Italian fencer (born 1984)

Personal information
- Nationality: Italian
- Born: 21 August 1984 (age 41) Rome, Italy
- Height: 1.76 m (5 ft 9 1/2 in)
- Weight: 67 kg (148 lb; 10.6 st)

Fencing career
- Sport: Fencing
- Weapon: Épée
- Hand: Right-handed
- Club: Fiamma Azzura
- FIE ranking: current ranking
Medal record
World Championships
Gold medal – first place	2009 Lisbon	Team épée
Bronze medal – third place	2014 Kazan	Team épée
European Championships
Silver medal – second place	2010 Leipzig	Team épée
Silver medal – second place	2013 Zagreb	Individual
Bronze medal – third place	2003 Bourges	Team épée
Bronze medal – third place	2008 Kyiv	Team épée
Bronze medal – third place	2014 Strasbourg	Team épée

Francesca Quondamcarlo (Italian pronunciation: [franˈtʃeska ˌkwɔndaŋˈkarlo]; born 21 August 1984) is an Italian épée fencer. She won a gold medal with Italy in the 2009 World Fencing Championships and a silver medal in the 2013 European Fencing Championships.
