= Siarhei Byk =

Belarusian fencer (born 1990)

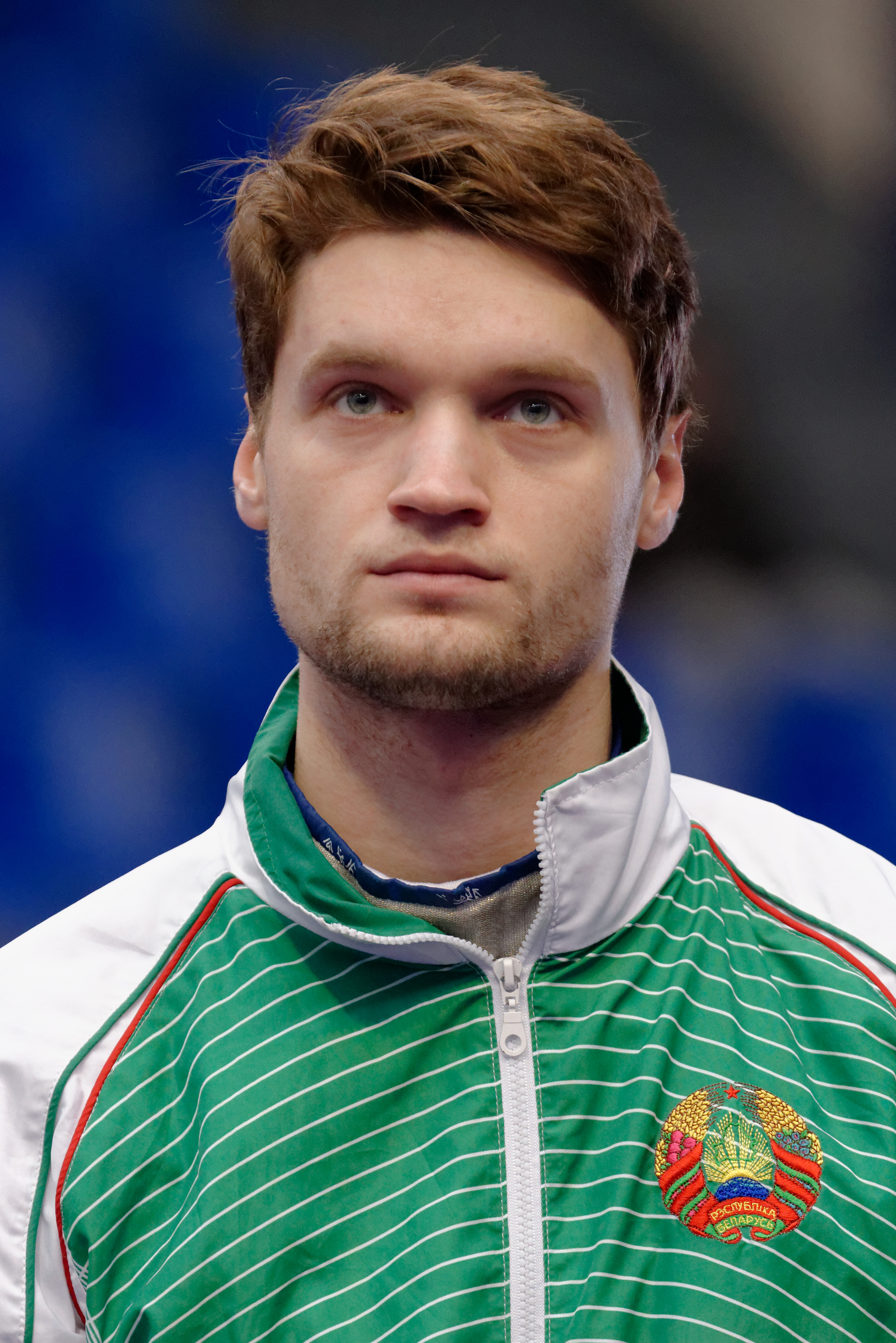

Personal information
- Born: 8 July 1990 (age 36)
- Home town: Brest, Belarus
- Height: 1.92 m (6 ft 4 in)
- Weight: 80 kg (180 lb)

Fencing career
- Sport: Fencing
- Weapon: Foil
- Hand: right-handed
- Club: SCAF RB (Past); Star Fencing Academy (Present)
- FIE ranking: current ranking

Siarhei Byk (Belarusian: Сергей Бык; born 8 July 1990) is a Belarusian foil fencer, member of the national team.

Byk earned a silver medal in the 2011 U23 European Championships in Kazan and a bronze medal in the 2013 edition of the same competition in Toruń. He reached the quarter-finals at the 2013 European Fencing Championships in Zagreb, but was defeated by James-Andrew Davis of Great Britain.
