= Nikolász Iliász =

Hungarian fencer (born 1991)

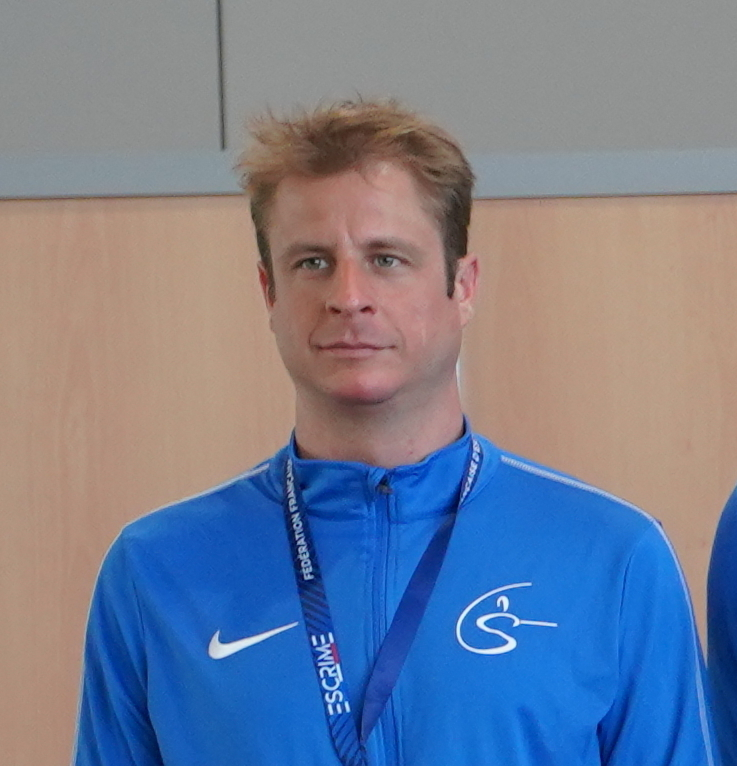

Personal information
- Nationality: Hungarian
- Born: 3 November 1991 (age 34)

Fencing career
- Sport: Fencing
- Weapon: sabre
- Hand: left-handed
- National coach: Bence Szabó
- Club: Vasas SC
- Head coach: Ferenc Riba
- FIE ranking: current ranking
Medal record
Men's sabre
Representing Hungary
World Championships
Silver medal – second place	2016 Rio de Janeiro	Team
Silver medal – second place	2025 Tbilisi	Team
Bronze medal – third place	2009 Antalya	Team
European Championships
Gold medal – first place	2025 Genoa	Team
Silver medal – second place	2013 Zagreb	Team

Nikolász Iliász (born 3 November 1991) is a Hungarian sabre fencer, team bronze medallist at the 2009 World Championships and silver team medallist at the 2013 European Championships.

== Career ==
Iliász first tried different sports and took up fencing in 2002 at Vasas SC in Budapest on the suggestion of his grandmother, who had practiced it. His first coach was György Gerevich, son of seven-time Olympic champion Aladár Gerevich, who also trained Olympic champion Áron Szilágyi. In 2007 he joined the cadet national team, with which he won a gold medal at the Cadet European Championships in Novi Sad and a silver medal at the Cadet European Championships in Prag. The following year he earned an individual gold medal both at the Cadet and Junior European Championships, as well as a team gold and an individual bronze at the Junior World Championships in Acireale. He became Junior World champion in Baku in 2010 after defeating Germany's Sebastian Schroedter.

Iliász joined the senior national team as reserve in the 2009. With them he took part to the World Championships in Antalya. Hungary prevailed over Belarus in the quarter-finals, but lost to Romania in the semi-finals. They overcame Russia by a single hit and came away with a bronze medal. In the 2009–10 season he made his breakthrough with three bronze medals in the Budapest Grand Prix and the Warsaw and Isla de Margarita World Cups. At the 2010 World Championships in Paris Iliász reached the table of 16 after defeating No.3 seed Gu Bon-gil, but he lost to Russia's Veniamin Reshetnikov and finished 13th. He closed the season No.14 in World rankings. For this performance and his Junior World title he was named best male junior athlete of the year by the Hungarian National Institute for Sport (Nemzeti Sportintézet).

The following seasons proved disappointing and Iliász was dropped from the national team. He was selected again in 2013 for the European Championships in Zagreb. Hungary saw off Germany and Ukraine, but yielded to Italy in the final and came away with a silver medal.

Iliász is a student at Eötvös Loránd University in Budapest.

== Medal record ==
=== World Championship ===
Year	Location	Event	Position
2025	(Georgia (country)) Tbilisi, Georgia	Team Men's Sabre	2nd
