= Dmytro Boiko =

Ukrainian sabre fencer (born 1986)

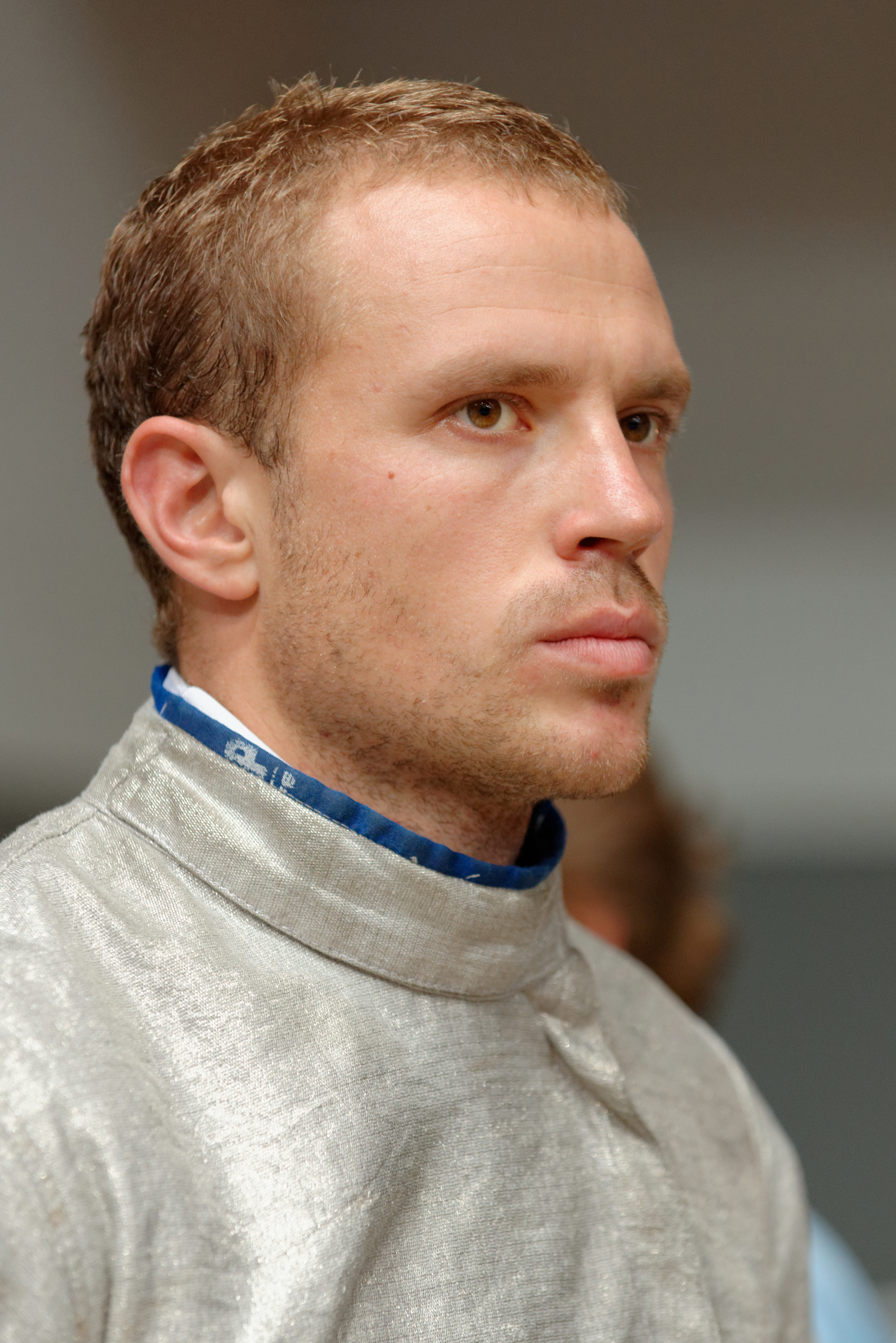
- Boiko at the 2013 World Fencing Championships

Personal information
- Native name: Дмитро Вікторович Бойко
- Nickname: Dima
- Born: 16 January 1986 (age 40) Polyan', Khmelnytskyi Oblast, Ukrainian SSR, Soviet Union
- Height: 1.86 m (6 ft 1 in)
- Weight: 82 kg (181 lb)

Fencing career
- Sport: Fencing
- Country: Ukraine
- Weapon: Sabre
- Hand: right-handed
- National coach: Valery Shturbabin
- Club: Dynamo Khmelnytskyi
- FIE ranking: current ranking
Medal record
World Championships
Silver medal – second place	Turin 2006	Sabre Team
Bronze medal – third place	Havana 2003	Sabre Team
European Championships
Bronze medal – third place	Zagreb 2013	Sabre Team
Summer Universiade
Gold medal – first place	2007 Bangkok	Team
Gold medal – first place	2011 Shenzhen	Team
Silver medal – second place	2005 Izmir	Team

Dmytro Viktorovych Boiko (Ukrainian: Дмитро Вікторович Бойко; born 16 January 1986) is a Ukrainian sabre fencer.

== Biography ==
Boiko won a silver medal in the sabre team event at the 2006 World Fencing Championships, after losing to France in the final. He accomplished this with his teammates Volodymyr Lukashenko, Oleh Shturbabin, and Vladislav Tretiak.

Boiko was educated at the Lviv State University of Physical Culture. He married Ukrainian Olympic sabre fencer Olha Kharlan in August 2014. They later divorced.

== Achievements ==
2006 World Fencing Championships, team sabre
