= Krzysztof Mikołajczak =

Polish fencer (born 1984)

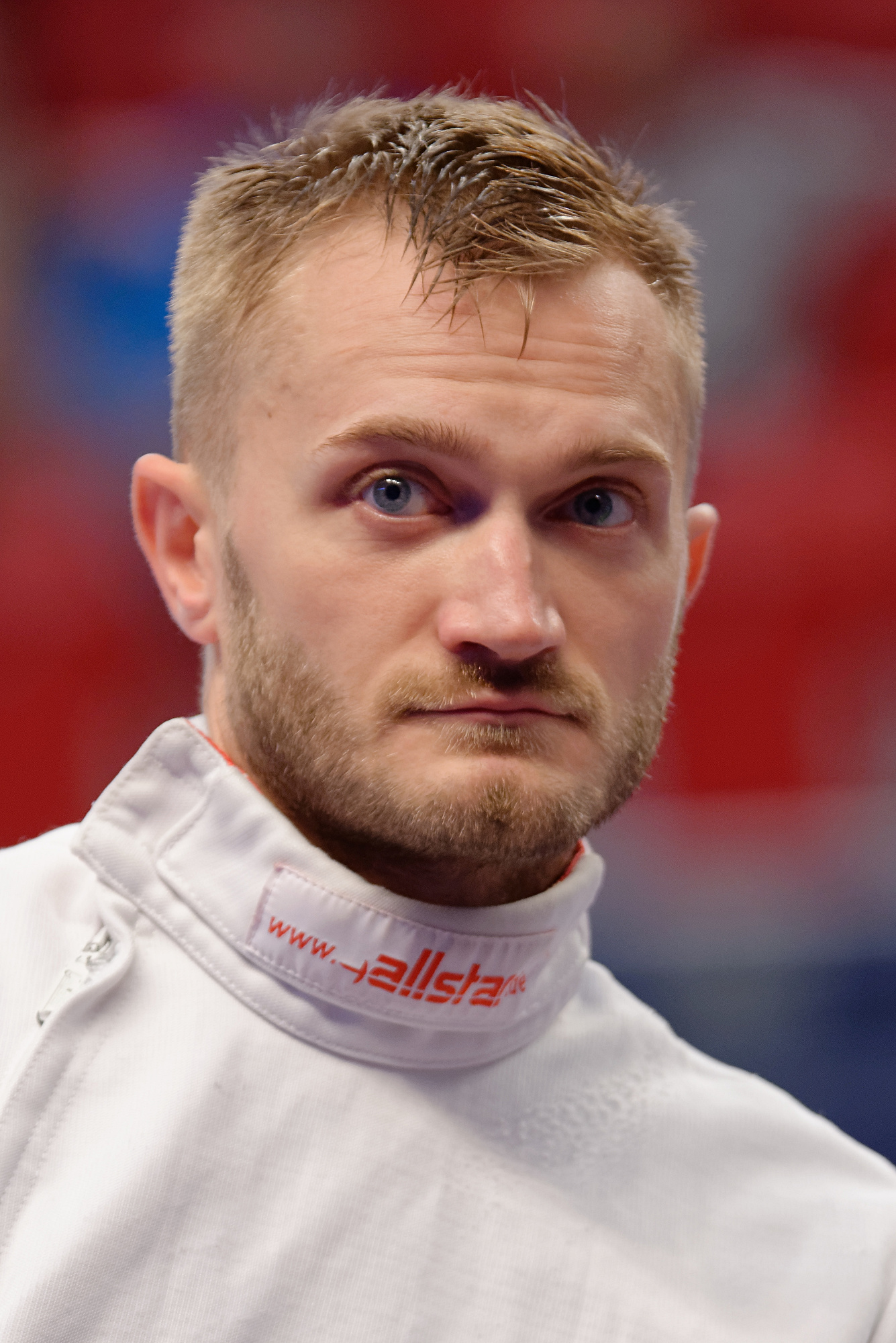

Personal information
- Born: 5 October 1984 (age 41) Warsaw
- Height: 1.81 m (5 ft 11 in)
- Weight: 73 kg (161 lb)

Fencing career
- Sport: Fencing
- Weapon: épée
- Hand: left-handed
- National coach: Marek Julczewski
- Club: Stowarzyszenie Szermierzy Legia Warsawa
- FIE ranking: current ranking
Medal record
Men's épée
Representing Poland
World Championships
Bronze medal – third place	2009 Antalya	Team
European Championships
Silver medal – second place	2004 Copenhagen	Team
Gold medal – first place	2005 Zalaegerszeg	Team
Silver medal – second place	2006 İzmir	Team
Silver medal – second place	2007 Ghent	Team
Bronze medal – third place	2013 Zagreb	Individual

Krzysztof Mikołajczak (born 5 October 1984) is a Polish épée fencer, team bronze medallist at the 2009 World Fencing Championships in Antalya and individual bronze medallist at the 2013 European Fencing Championships in Zagreb.

Mikołajczak studied pharmacy at the Medical University of Warsaw. He holds the grade of lance-corporal in the Polish Armed Forces.
