= Stefanie Kubissa =

German fencer

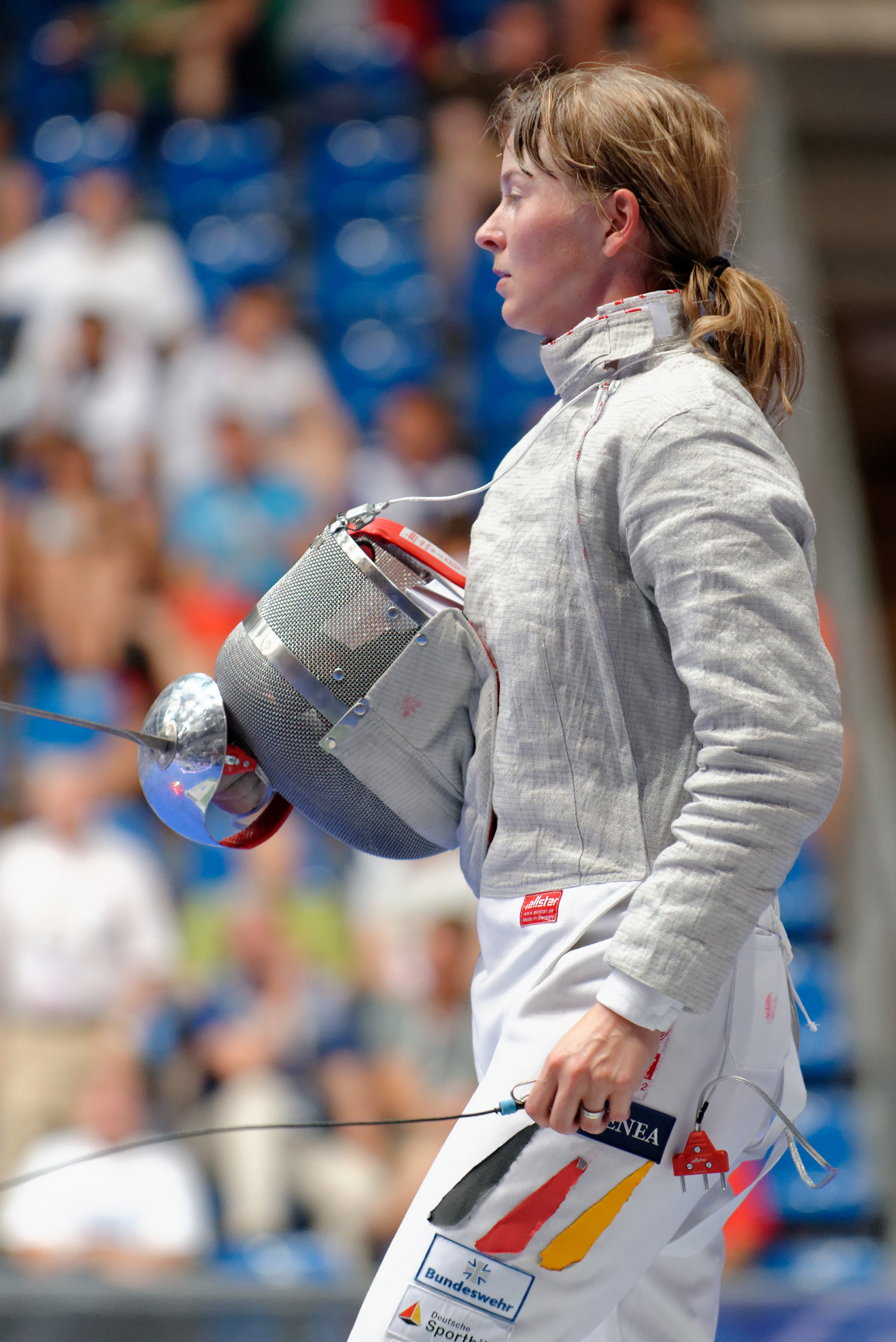

Personal information
- Nickname: Kubi
- Born: 6 January 1985 (age 41)
- Height: 1.71 m (5 ft 7 in)
- Weight: 64 kg (141 lb)

Fencing career
- Sport: Fencing
- Weapon: sabre
- Hand: right-handed
- National coach: Eero Lehmann
- Club: TSV Bayer Dormagen
- FIE ranking: current ranking
Medal record
Women's sabre
Representing Germany
World Championships
Bronze medal – third place	2001 Nîmes	Team
European Championships
Gold medal – first place	2001 Koblenz	Team

Stefanie Kubissa (born 6 January 1985) is a German sabre fencer, team bronze medallist at the 2001 World Championships and team gold medallist at the 2001 European Championships.

== Career ==
Kubissa first competed in nine-pin bowling, in which she was Middle Rhein champion and German national champion for her age group, category B. When she was 13 years old she switched to sabre at TSV Kanten under coach Emmo Kawald. Within her first year of training she became regional champion both in the cadet and junior categories.

In the 2000–01 season she took a silver medal in the Göppingen Junior World Cup. At the age of sixteen, she joined the national sabre team, composed of Sandra Benad, Sabine Thieltges and Doreen Häntzsch. At the 2001 European Championships at home in Koblenz Germany prevailed over Hungary and Poland, then defeated Italy in the final to earn the gold medal. After this achievement Kubissa transferred to TSV Dormagen, a bigger club which could shoulder the travel costs to international competitions. She took part in the World Championships in Nîmes, where she reached the table of 16. In the team event Germany lost to Russia in the semifinals, but overcame Azerbaijan in the small final and came away with a bronze medal.

She was German national champion in 2007, 2010, 2012 and 2013.
