= Carolina Erba =

Italian fencer (born 1985)

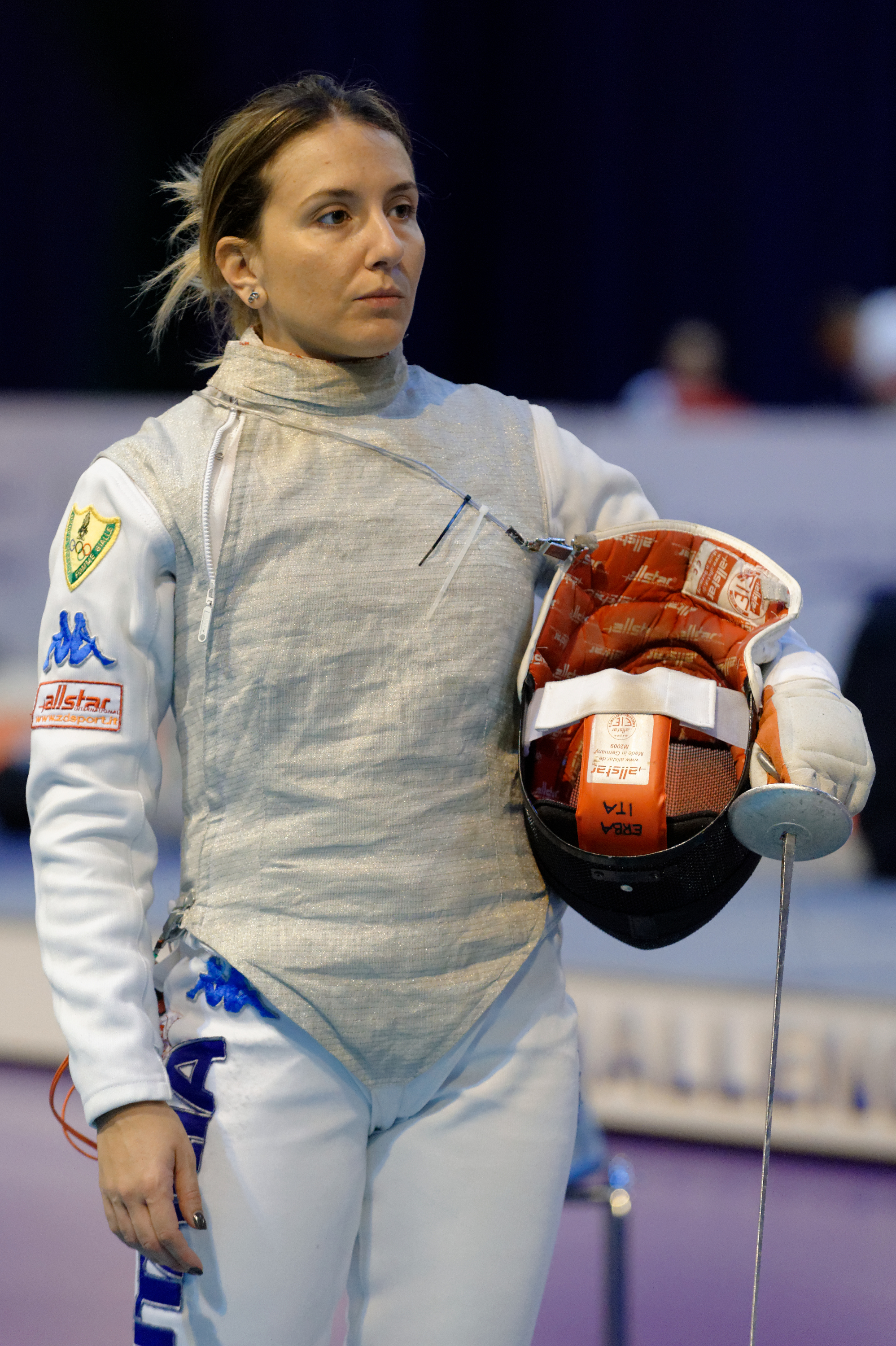
- At the 2014 Saint-Maur World Cup

Personal information
- Born: 8 March 1985 (age 41) Busto Arsizio, Lombardy
- Height: 1.65 m (5 ft 5 in)

Fencing career
- Sport: Fencing
- Weapon: foil
- Hand: left-handed
- National coach: Andrea Cipressa
- Club: GS Fiamme Gialle
- Head coach: Fabio Galli
- FIE ranking: current ranking
Medal record
Women's foil
Representing Italy
World Championships
Gold medal – first place	2013 Budapest	Team foil
European Games
Bronze medal – third place	2015 Baku	Team foil
European Championships
Gold medal – first place	2013 Zagreb	Team foil

Carolina Erba (born 8 March 1985) is an Italian foil fencer, team World and European champion in 2013. She earned three bronze medals in the Fencing World Cup: at Seoul in 2013 and at Marseilles in 2013 and 2014.

Erba is engaged to Valerio Aspromonte, who is a member of Italy's senior foil team.
