= Aleksey Khovansky (fencer) =

Russian fencer (born 1987)

Aleksey Khovanskiy
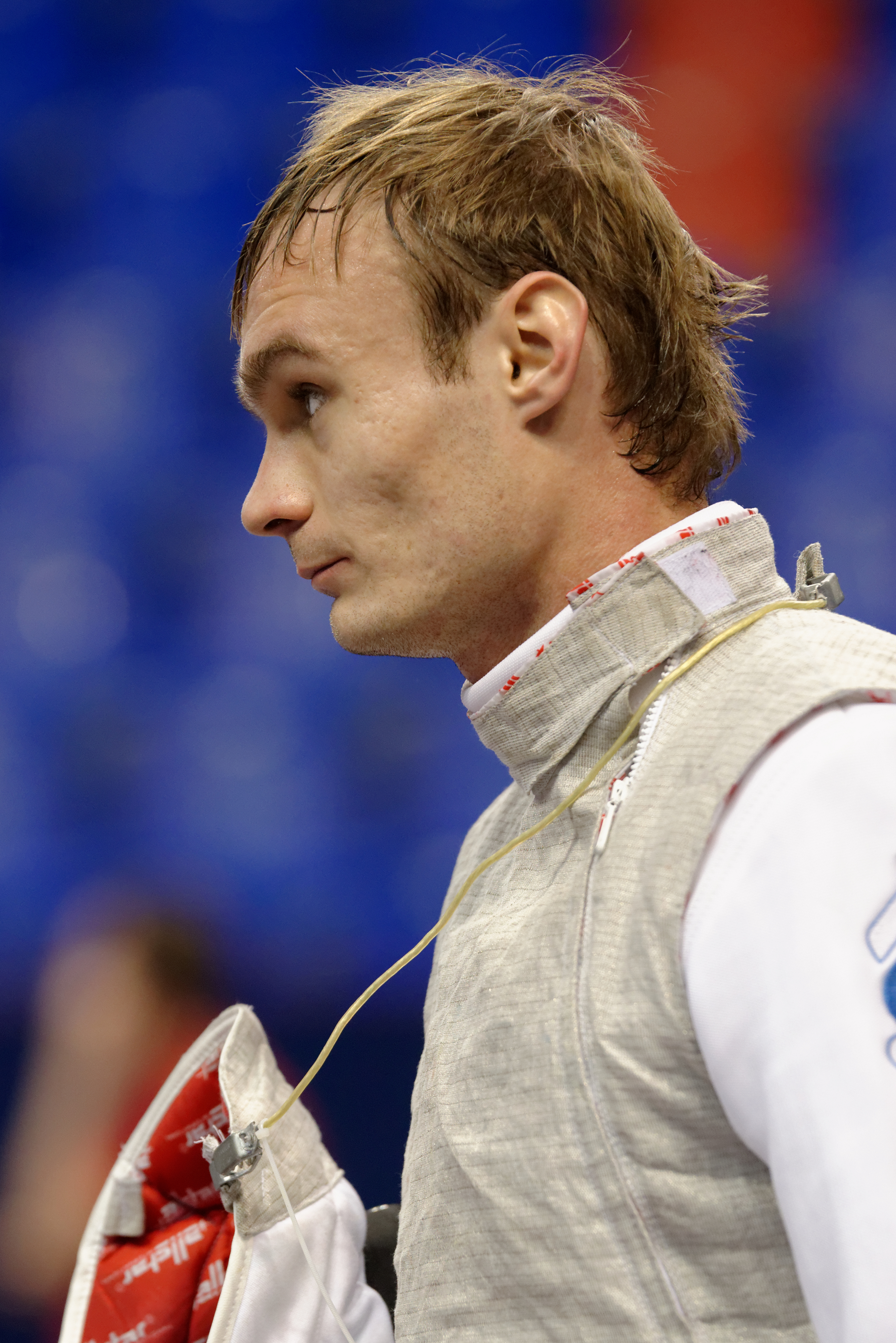
- Khovanskiy at the 2015 Paris World Cup

Personal information
- Full name: Aleksey Igorevich Khovanskiy
- Born: 6 June 1987 (age 39) Odintsovo, Moscow Oblast
- Height: 1.86 m (6 ft 1 in)
- Weight: 80 kg (176 lb)

Fencing career
- Sport: Fencing
- Weapon: Foil
- Hand: right-handed
- National coach: Stefano Cerioni
- Club: CSKA
- Head coach: Ilgar Mammadov
- FIE ranking: current ranking
Medal record
Men's fencing
Representing Russia
World Championships
| Bronze medal – third place | 2009 Antalya | Team foil |
European Games
| Bronze medal – third place | 2015 Baku | Team foil |
European Championships
| Silver medal – second place | 2007 Ghent | Team foil |
| Silver medal – second place | 2008 Kiev | Team foil |
| Silver medal – second place | 2009 Plovdiv | Team foil |
| Silver medal – second place | 2010 Leipzig | Team foil |

Aleksey Igorevich Khovanskiy (Russian: Алексей Игоревич Хованский; born 6 June 1987) is a Russian former foil fencer, who earned a team bronze medal in the 2009 World Fencing Championships and four team silver medals in the European Fencing Championships (2007–10).

His best results in the Fencing World Cup were a third place in the 2010 Challenge International de Paris, in the 2012 Saint-Petersburg Grand Prix, and in the 2013 Copa Villa.
