= Karolina Chlewińska =

Polish fencer (born 1983)

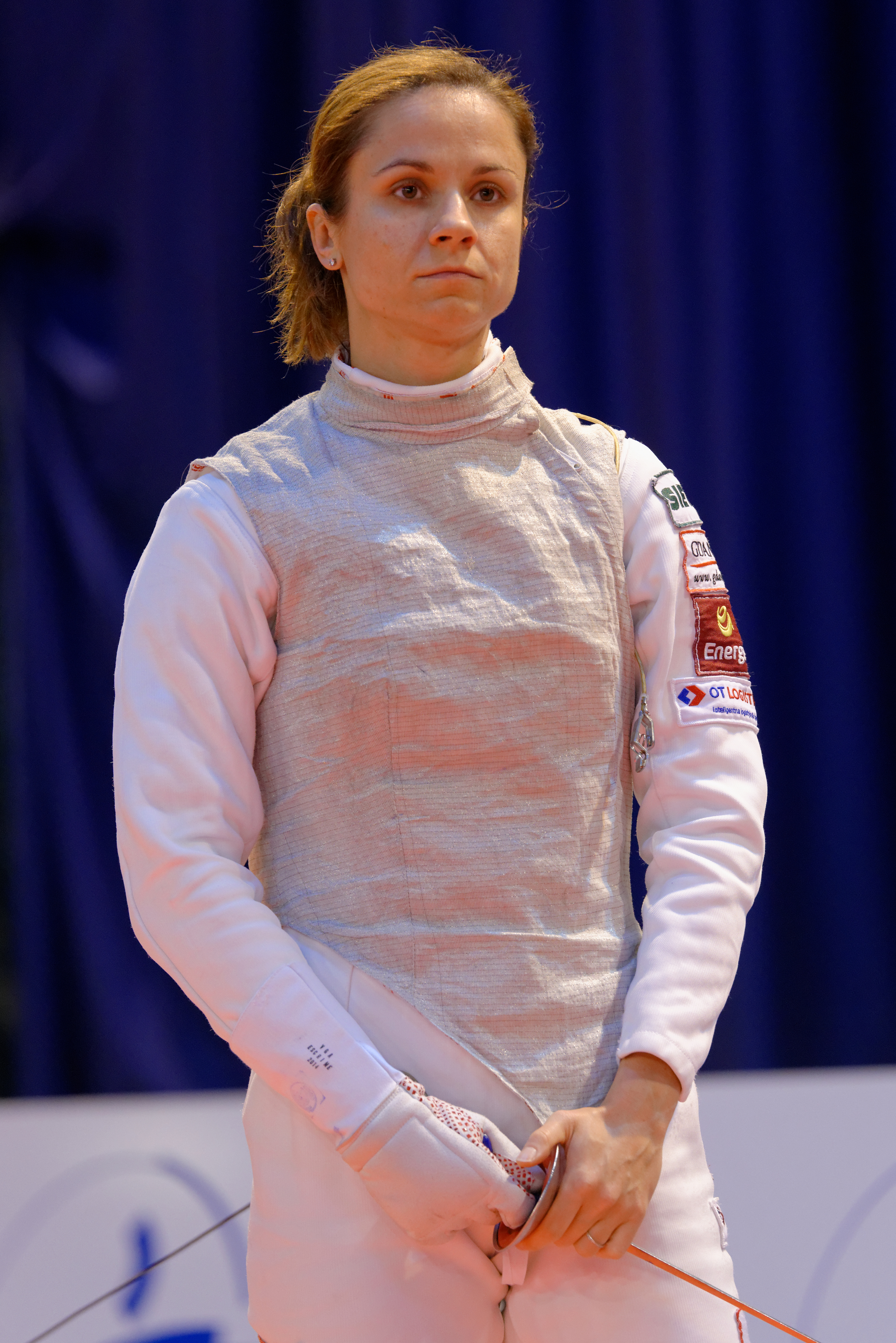

Personal information
- Born: 8 November 1983 (age 42) Gdynia, Poland
- Height: 1.76 m (5 ft 9 in)
- Weight: 64 kg (141 lb)

Fencing career
- Sport: Fencing
- Weapon: foil
- Hand: right-handedness
- National coach: Longin Szmit
- Club: AZS AWF Gdańsk
- FIE ranking: current ranking
Medal record
Women's foil
Representing Poland
World Championships
Silver medal – second place	2010 Paris	Team
European Championships
Bronze medal – third place	2006 İzmir	Team

Karolina Chlewińska (born 8 November 1983) is a Polish foil fencer, team silver medalist at the 2010 World Championships.

Chlewińska won a bronze medal at the 2003 Junior World Championships in Trapani. She competed in team foil at the 2008 Summer Olympics in Beijing, where the Polish team placed seventh.
