= Women's foil at the 2013 World Fencing Championships =

- Venue: Syma Sport and Events Centre
- Location: Budapest, Hungary
- Dates: 5-7 August

Medalists
gold medal	Arianna Errigo	Italy
silver medal	Carolin Golubytskyi	Germany
bronze medal	Elisa Di Francisca	Italy
bronze medal	Inna Deriglazova	Russia

The Women's foil event of the 2013 World Fencing Championships was held on August 7, 2013. The qualification was held on August 5, 2013.

== Draw ==
=== Finals ===
All times are (UTC+2)

Semi-finals
18:00
(Italy) Elisa Di Francisca	12
(Germany) Carolin Golubytskyi	13
18:25
(Russia) Inna Deriglazova	11
(Italy) Arianna Errigo	15

Final
19:20
(Germany) Carolin Golubytskyi	8
(Italy) Arianna Errigo	15

=== Top half ===
==== Blue piste ====
Round of 64
1	(Italy) Elisa Di Francisca	15
64	(Mexico) Adriana Camacho	4
33	(Ukraine) Anastasiya Moskovska	12
32	(Lebanon) Mona Shaito	15
17	(Germany) Anne Sauer	15
48	(Venezuela) Liz Rivero	2
49	(Poland) Martyna Jelinska	12
16	(Hungary) Aida Mohamed	13
9	(France) Ysaora Thibus	15
56	(Poland) Hanna Lyczbinska	5
41	(Japan) Minami Kano	7
24	(Germany) Katja Wächter	15
25	(Russia) Yulia Biryukova	15
40	(China) Wang Chen	10
57	(Venezuela) Isis Jimenez	9
8	(Russia) Larisa Korobeynikova	15

Round of 32
1	(Italy) Elisa Di Francisca	15
32	(Lebanon) Mona Shaito	8
17	(Germany) Anne Sauer	7
16	(Hungary) Aida Mohamed	15
9	(France) Ysaora Thibus	15
24	(Germany) Katja Wächter	7
25	(Russia) Yulia Biryukova	8
8	(Russia) Larisa Korobeynikova	15

Round of 16
1	(Italy) Elisa Di Francisca	15
16	(Hungary) Aida Mohamed	3
9	(France) Ysaora Thibus	7
8	(Russia) Larisa Korobeynikova	15

Quarterfinals
1	(Italy) Elisa Di Francisca	15
8	(Russia) Larisa Korobeynikova	5

==== Yellow piste ====
Round of 64
5	(France) Astrid Guyart	13
60	(Hungary) Edina Knapek	15
37	(Ukraine) Alexandra Sinyta	13
28	(Hungary) Katalin Varga	15
21	(France) Anita Blaze	11
44	(China) Lu Yazhu	15
53	(Turkey) Irem Karamete	4
12	(Italy) Carolina Erba	15
13	(South Korea) Jung Gil-Ok	15
52	(Japan) Iyo Matsumoto	8
45	(Ukraine) Kateryna Chentsova	13
20	(Poland) Karolina Chlewińska	15
29	(South Korea) Kim Mi-Na	15
36	(China) Chen Bingbing	13
61	(United Kingdom) Natalia Sheppard	1
4	(Germany) Carolin Golubytskyi	7

Round of 32
60	(Hungary) Edina Knapek	15
28	(Hungary) Katalin Varga	13
44	(China) Lu Yazhu	7
12	(Italy) Carolina Erba	15
13	(South Korea) Jung Gil-Ok	15
20	(Poland) Karolina Chlewińska	9
29	(South Korea) Kim Mi-Na	8
4	(Germany) Carolin Golubytskyi	15

Round of 16
60	(Hungary) Edina Knapek	13
12	(Italy) Carolina Erba	14
13	(South Korea) Jung Gil-Ok	2
4	(Germany) Carolin Golubytskyi	15

Quarterfinals
12	(Italy) Carolina Erba	5
4	(Germany) Carolin Golubytskyi	15

=== Bottom half ===
==== Green piste ====
Round of 64
3	(Russia) Inna Deriglazova	15
62	(Hong Kong) Cheung Kimberley Vanessa	5
35	(Canada) Kelleigh Ryan	8
30	(Germany) Sandra Bingenheimer	15
19	(Ukraine) Olha Leleiko	15
46	(Argentina) Flavia Johana Mormandi	7
51	(Mexico) Melissa Rebolledo	5
14	(South Korea) Jeon Hee-Sook	15
11	(Russia) Diana Yakovleva	15
54	(Brazil) Tais Rochel	4
43	(Colombia) Saskia Loretta van Erven Garcia	9
22	(South Korea) Lim Seung-Min	15
27	(United States) Nicole Ross	15
38	(Malaysia) Natasha Ezzra Abu Bakar	3
59	(Canada) Eleanor Harvey	5
6	(United States) Lee Kiefer	15

Round of 32
3	(Russia) Inna Deriglazova	15
30	(Germany) Sandra Bingenheimer	6
19	(Ukraine) Olha Leleiko	15
14	(South Korea) Jeon Hee-Sook	10
11	(Russia) Diana Yakovleva	9
22	(South Korea) Lim Seung-Min	8
27	(United States) Nicole Ross	15
6	(United States) Lee Kiefer	12

Round of 16
3	(Russia) Inna Deriglazova	13
19	(Ukraine) Olha Leleiko	11
11	(Russia) Diana Yakovleva	15
27	(United States) Nicole Ross	14

Quarterfinals
3	(Russia) Inna Deriglazova	15
11	(Russia) Diana Yakovleva	9

==== Red piste ====
Round of 64
7	(United States) Nzingha Prescod	15
58	(Japan) Haruka Yanaoka	8
39	(Hungary) Gabriella Varga	10
26	(Italy) Valentina Vezzali	12
23	(Mexico) Nataly Michel	15
42	(United States) Margaret Lu	6
55	(Brazil) Gabriela Cecchini	9
10	(Tunisia) Ines Boubakri	15
15	(France) Corinne Maîtrejean	15
50	(Hong Kong) Liu Yan Wai	5
47	(Venezuela) Yulitza Suarez	11
18	(Japan) Shiho Nishioka	15
31	(Poland) Martyna Synoradzka	15
34	(Canada) Alanna Goldie	14
63	(Singapore) Wang Wenying	6
2	(Italy) Arianna Errigo	15

Round of 32
7	(United States) Nzingha Prescod	13
26	(Italy) Valentina Vezzali	15
23	(Mexico) Nataly Michel	3
10	(Tunisia) Ines Boubakri	15
15	(France) Corinne Maîtrejean	15
18	(Japan) Shiho Nishioka	7
31	(Poland) Martyna Synoradzka	5
2	(Italy) Arianna Errigo	15

Round of 16
26	(Italy) Valentina Vezzali	15
10	(Tunisia) Ines Boubakri	7
15	(France) Corinne Maîtrejean	3
2	(Italy) Arianna Errigo	15

Quarterfinals
26	(Italy) Valentina Vezzali	8
2	(Italy) Arianna Errigo	15

== Final classification ==
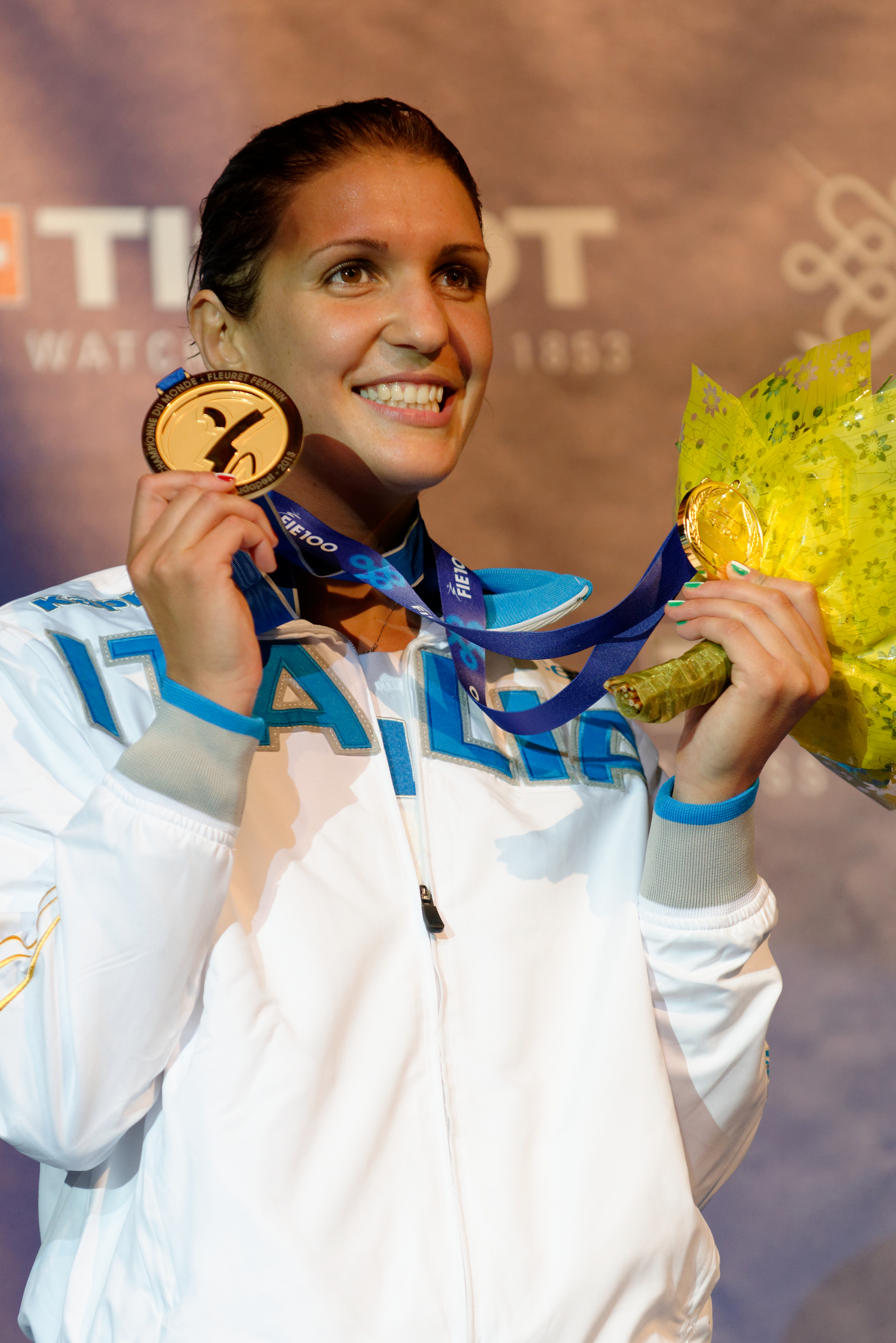
2013 World Champion Arianna Errigo

Rank	Athlete	Nation
1st place, gold medalist(s)	Arianna Errigo	Italy
2nd place, silver medalist(s)	Carolin Golubytskyi	Germany
3rd place, bronze medalist(s)	Inna Deriglazova	Russia
3rd place, bronze medalist(s)	Elisa Di Francisca	Italy
5	Larisa Korobeynikova	Russia
6	Diana Yakovleva	Russia
7	Carolina Erba	Italy
8	Valentina Vezzali	Italy
9	Ysaora Thibus	France
10	Ines Boubakri	Tunisia
11	Jung Gil-Ok	South Korea
12	Corinne Maîtrejean	France
13	Aida Mohamed	Hungary
14	Olha Leleiko	Ukraine
15	Nicole Ross	United States
16	Edina Knapek	Hungary
17	Lee Kiefer	United States
18	Nzingha Prescod	United States
19	Jeon Hee-Sook	South Korea
20	Anne Sauer	Germany
21	Shiho Nishioka	Japan
22	Karolina Chlewińska	Poland
23	Lim Seung-Min	South Korea
24	Nataly Michel	Mexico
25	Katja Wächter	Germany
26	Yulia Biryukova	Russia
27	Katalin Varga	Hungary
28	Kim Mi-Na	South Korea
29	Sandra Bingenheimer	Germany
30	Martyna Synoradzka	Poland
31	Mona Shaito	Lebanon
32	Lu Yazhu	China
33	Astrid Guyart	France
34	Anita Blaze	France
35	Anastasiya Moskovska	Ukraine
36	Alanna Goldie	Canada
37	Kelleigh Ryan	Canada
38	Chen Bingbing	China
38	Alexandra Sinyta	Ukraine
40	Natasha Ezzra Abu Bakar	Malaysia
41	Gabriella Varga	Hungary
42	Wang Chen	China
43	Minami Kano	Japan
44	Margaret Lu	United States
45	Saskia Loretta Van Erven Garcia	Colombia
46	Kateryna Chentsova	Ukraine
47	Flavia Johana Mormandi	Argentina
48	Yulitza Suarez	Venezuela
49	Liz Rivero	Venezuela
50	Martyna Jelinska	Poland
51	Liu Yan Wai	Hong Kong
52	Melissa Rebolledo	Mexico
53	Iyo Matsumoto	Japan
54	Irem Karamete	Turkey
55	Gabriela Cecchini	Brazil
55	Tais Rochel	Brazil
57	Hanna Lyczbinska	Poland
58	Isis Jimenez	Venezuela
59	Haruka Yanaoka	Japan
60	Eleanor Harvey	Canada
61	Natalia Sheppard	Great Britain
62	Cheung Kimberley Vanessa	Singapore
63	Wang Wenying	Singapore
64	Adriana Camacho	Mexico
65	Barbara Garcia Azua	Chile
66	Anissa Khelfaoui	Algeria
67	Shi Yun	China
68	Lin Po Heung	Hong Kong
69	Wong Cheryl Ye Han	Singapore
70	Oxana Dabrock	Moldova
70	Shannon Comerford	Canada
72	Bella Zamlin	Israel
73	Débora Nogueira	Portugal
74	Tabata Lima	Brazil
75	Nunta Chantasuvannasin	Thailand
76	Irene Enright	Finland
77	Jacqueline Budniak	Australia
78	Luk Hoi Ching Elka	Hong Kong
79	Ang Joan Liting	Singapore
80	Claire Daniel	Australia
81	Christine Botros	Brazil
81	Jenny Bonney-Millett	Australia
83	Tsolmon Batkhuu	Mongolia
