= 2015 European Fencing Championships =

European fencing championships, 2015

- Host city: (Switzerland) Montreux
- Dates: 5–11 June 2015
- Main venue: Montreux Music & Convention Centre
- Website: www.fencingeuro2015.com

The 2015 European Fencing Championships were held in Montreux, Switzerland from 5 to 11 June 2015 at the Montreux Music & Convention Centre.

== Schedule ==
●	Opening Ceremony	●	Finals	●	Closing Ceremony

June	5	6	7	8	9	10	11	Total
Ceremonies	●						●	
Foil Individual		Men		Women				2
Épée Individual		Women	Men					2
Sabre Individual			Women	Men				2
Foil Team					Men		Women	2
Épée Team					Women	Men		2
Sabre Team						Women	Men	2
Total Gold Medals	0	2	2	2	2	2	2	12

== Medal summary ==
=== Men's events ===
Event	Gold	Silver	Bronze
Foil	Andrea Cassarà (ITA)	Daniele Garozzo (ITA)	Edoardo Luperi (ITA); Carlos Llavador (ESP)
Épée	Gauthier Grumier (FRA)	Max Heinzer (SUI)	Pavel Sukhov (RUS); Gábor Boczkó (HUN)
Sabre	Áron Szilágyi (HUN)	Max Hartung (GER)	Nikolay Kovalev (RUS); Aleksey Yakimenko (RUS)
Team Foil	France; Jérémy Cadot; Enzo Lefort; Erwann Le Péchoux; Julien Mertine	Russia; Artur Akhmatkhuzin; Aleksey Cheremisinov; Renal Ganeyev; Dmitry Rigin	Germany; Sebastian Bachmann; Peter Joppich; Moritz Kröplin; André Sanità
Team Épée	France; Gauthier Grumier; Ronan Gustin; Daniel Jérent; Ulrich Robeiri	Estonia; Marno Allika; Nikolai Novosjolov; Sten Priinits; Peeter Turnau	Switzerland; Peer Borsky; Max Heinzer; Fabian Kauter; Benjamin Steffen
Team Sabre	Germany; Max Hartung; Matyas Szabo; Richard Hübers; Benedikt Wagner	Italy; Enrico Berrè; Luca Curatoli; Aldo Montano; Diego Occhiuzzi	Hungary; Tamás Decsi; Csanád Gémesi; András Szatmári; Áron Szilágyi

=== Women's events ===
Event	Gold	Silver	Bronze
Foil	Elisa Di Francisca (ITA)	Larisa Korobeynikova (RUS)	Aida Mohamed (HUN); Arianna Errigo (ITA)
Épée	Violetta Kolobova (RUS)	Rossella Fiamingo (ITA)	Simona Pop (ROU); Emese Szász (HUN)
Sabre	Sofiya Velikaya (RUS)	Charlotte Lembach (FRA)	Rossella Gregorio (ITA); Olena Voronina (UKR)
Team Foil	Italy; Martina Batini; Arianna Errigo; Elisa di Francisca; Valentina Vezzali	Russia; Inna Deriglazova; Yulia Biryukova; Larisa Korobeynikova; Aida Shanaeva	France; Anita Blaze; Pauline Ranvier; Astrid Guyart; Ysaora Thibus
Team Épée	Romania; Ana Maria Brânză; Simona Gherman; Simona Pop; Loredana Dinu	Estonia; Irina Embrich; Erika Kirpu; Julia Beljajeva; Katrina Lehis	Italy; Francesca Boscarelli; Rossella Fiamingo; Bianca Del Carretto; Mara Navarria
Team Sabre	Russia; Ekaterina Dyachenko; Yana Egorian; Yuliya Gavrilova; Sofiya Velikaya	France; Cécilia Berder; Saoussen Boudiaf; Marion Brunet; Charlotte Lembach	Ukraine; Olha Kharlan; Alina Komashchuk; Olena Kravatska; Olena Voronina

=== Medal table ===
Rank	Nation	Gold	Silver	Bronze	Total
1	Italy	3	3	4	10
2	Russia	3	3	3	9
3	France	3	2	1	6
4	Germany	1	1	1	3
5	Hungary	1	0	4	5
6	Romania	1	0	1	2
7	Estonia	0	2	0	2
8	Switzerland*	0	1	1	2
9	Ukraine	0	0	2	2
10	Spain	0	0	1	1
Totals (10 entries)		12	12	18	42

Host

== Results ==
=== Men ===
==== Foil individual ====
Position	Name	Country
1st place, gold medalist(s)	Andrea Cassarà	Italy
2nd place, silver medalist(s)	Daniele Garozzo	Italy
3rd place, bronze medalist(s)	Edoardo Luperi	Italy
3rd place, bronze medalist(s)	Carlos Llavador	Spain
5.	Dmitry Rigin	Russia
6.	Richard Kruse	Great Britain
7.	Radu Dărăban	Romania
8.	James-Andrew Davis	Great Britain

Quarter-finals
(United Kingdom) James-Andrew Davis	8
(Italy) Daniele Garozzo	15
(Romania) Radu Dărăban	5
(Italy) Edoardo Luperi	15
(United Kingdom) Richard Kruse	10
(Spain) Carlos Llavador	15
(Russia) Dmitry Rigin	9
(Italy) Andrea Cassarà	15

Semi-finals
(Italy) Daniele Garozzo	15
(Italy) Edoardo Luperi	6
(Spain) Carlos Llavador	10
(Italy) Andrea Cassarà	15

Final
(Italy) Daniele Garozzo	11
(Italy) Andrea Cassarà	15

==== Épée individual ====
Position	Name	Country
1st place, gold medalist(s)	Gauthier Grumier	France
2nd place, silver medalist(s)	Max Heinzer	Switzerland
3rd place, bronze medalist(s)	Pavel Sukhov	Russia
3rd place, bronze medalist(s)	Gábor Boczkó	Hungary
5.	Maksym Khvorost	Ukraine
6.	Alexandre Blaszyck	France
7.	Ronan Gustin	France
8.	Daniel Jerent	France

Quarter-finals
(Russia) Pavel Sukhov	15
(France) Daniel Jerent	10
(France) Gauthier Grumier	15
(France) Alexandre Blaszyck	10
(Hungary) Gábor Boczkó	12
(France) Ronan Gustin	11
(Switzerland) Max Heinzer	14
(Ukraine) Maksym Khvorost	12

Semi-finals
(Russia) Pavel Sukhov	14
(France) Gauthier Grumier	15
(Hungary) Gábor Boczkó	14
(Switzerland) Max Heinzer	15

Final
(France) Gauthier Grumier	15
(Switzerland) Max Heinzer	12

==== Sabre individual ====
Position	Name	Country
1st place, gold medalist(s)	Áron Szilágyi	Hungary
2nd place, silver medalist(s)	Max Hartung	Germany
3rd place, bronze medalist(s)	Nikolay Kovalev	Russia
3rd place, bronze medalist(s)	Alexey Yakimenko	Russia
5.	Aldo Montano	Italy
6.	Aliaksandr Buikevich	Belarus
7.	Vincent Anstett	France
8.	Matyas Szabo	Germany

Quarter-finals
(Germany) Matyas Szabo	9
(Russia) Nikolay Kovalev	15
(Germany) Max Hartung	15
(Belarus) Aliaksandr Buikevich	10
(Italy) Aldo Montano	11
(Russia) Alexey Yakimenko	15
(France) Vincent Anstett	7
(Hungary) Áron Szilágyi	15

Semi-finals
(Russia) Nikolay Kovalev	11
(Germany) Max Hartung	15
(Russia) Alexey Yakimenko	13
(Hungary) Áron Szilágyi	15

Final
(Germany) Max Hartung	11
(Hungary) Áron Szilágyi	15

==== Foil team ====
Position	Name	Country
1st place, gold medalist(s)	Jérémy Cadot; Enzo Lefort; Erwann Le Péchoux; Julien Mertine	France
2nd place, silver medalist(s)	Artur Akhmatkhuzin; Aleksey Cheremisinov; Renal Ganeyev; Dmitry Rigin	Russia
3rd place, bronze medalist(s)	Sebastian Bachmann; Peter Joppich; Moritz Kröplin; André Sanita	Germany
4.	James-Andrew Davis; Laurence Halsted; Richard Kruse; Marcus Mepstead	Great Britain
5.	Giorgio Avola; Andrea Cassarà; Daniele Garozzo; Edoardo Luperi	Italy
6.	Michał Janda; Paweł Kawiecki; Leszek Rajski; Jakub Surwiłło	Poland
7.	Rostyslav Hertsyk; Pylyp Kolesnikov; Andrii Pogrebniak; Klod Yunes	Ukraine
8.	Siarhei Byk; Aliaksandr Chaliankov; Uladzislau Lahunou; Aliaksandr Lukashevich	Belarus

Quarter-finals
France	45
Ukraine	35
Poland	35
Germany	45
Italy	25
Great Britain	45
Belarus	28
Russia	45

Semi-finals
France	45
Germany	35
Great Britain	30
Russia	45

Final
France	45
Russia	35
Third place
Germany	45
Great Britain	37

==== Épée team ====
Position	Name	Country
1st place, gold medalist(s)	Daniel Jerent; Ronan Gustin; Gauthier Grumier; Ulrich Robeiri	France
2nd place, silver medalist(s)	Nikolai Novosjolov; Marno Allika; Sten Priinits; Peeter Turnau	Estonia
3rd place, bronze medalist(s)	Benjamin Steffen; Max Heinzer; Fabian Kauter; Peer Borsky	Switzerland
4.	Dmytro Karyuchenko; Bohdan Nikishyn; Maksym Khvorost; Anatoliy Herey	Ukraine
5.	Jiří Beran; Pavel Pitra; Richard Pokorny; Martin Rubeš	Czech Republic
6.	José Luis Abajo; Miguel Moratilla; Yulen Pereira; Pau Roselló	Spain
7.	Gábor Boczkó; Géza Imre; András Rédli; Péter Somfai	Hungary
8.	Igor Turchin; Anton Avdeev; Pavel Sukhov; Vadim Anokhin	Russia

Quarter-finals
France	45
Spain	29
Hungary	34
Ukraine	45
Russia	36
Estonia	45
Czech Republic	40
Switzerland	45

Semi-finals
France	43
Ukraine	34
Estonia	42
Switzerland	41

Final
France	45
Estonia	32
Third place
Ukraine	28
Switzerland	39

==== Sabre team ====
Position	Name	Country
1st place, gold medalist(s)	Max Hartung; Matyas Szabo; Benedikt Wagner; Richard Hübers	Germany
2nd place, silver medalist(s)	Aldo Montano; Diego Occhiuzzi; Enrico Berrè; Luca Curatoli	Italy
3rd place, bronze medalist(s)	Tamás Decsi; Csanád Gémesi; András Szatmári; Áron Szilágyi	Hungary
4.	Tiberiu Dolniceanu; Alin Badea; Ciprian Gălățanu; Iulian Teodosiu	Romania
5.	Alexey Yakimenko; Nikolay Kovalev; Veniamin Reshetnikov; Kamil Ibragimov	Russia
6.	Dmytro Boiko; Andriy Yagodka; Dmytro Pundyk; Oleksiy Statsenko	Ukraine
7.	Julien Médard; Boladé Apithy; Nicolas Rousset; Vincent Anstett	France
8.	Valery Pryiemka; Aliaksandr Buikevich; Siarhei Shachanin; Artsiom Karabinski	Belarus

Quarter-finals
Germany	45
Ukraine	32
France	44
Hungary	45
Russia	40
Romania	45
Belarus	33
Italy	45

Semi-finals
Germany	45
Hungary	40
Romania	32
Italy	45

Final
Germany	45
Italy	44
Third place
Hungary	45
Romania	31

=== Women ===
==== Foil individual ====
Position	Name	Country
1st place, gold medalist(s)	Elisa Di Francisca	Italy
2nd place, silver medalist(s)	Larisa Korobeynikova	Russia
3rd place, bronze medalist(s)	Aida Mohamed	Hungary
3rd place, bronze medalist(s)	Arianna Errigo	Italy
5.	Valentina Vezzali	Italy
6.	Yulia Biryukova	Russia
7.	Gabriella Varga	Hungary
8.	Inna Deriglazova	Russia

Quarter-finals
(Italy) Valentina Vezzali	11
(Hungary) Aida Mohamed	15
(Russia) Larisa Korobeynikova	15
(Hungary) Gabriella Varga	9
(Italy) Arianna Errigo	15
(Russia) Yulia Biryukova	10
(Italy) Elisa Di Francisca	15
(Russia) Inna Deriglazova	14

Semi-finals
(Hungary) Aida Mohamed	13
(Russia) Larisa Korobeynikova	14
(Italy) Arianna Errigo	8
(Italy) Elisa Di Francisca	15

Final
(Russia) Larisa Korobeynikova	13
(Italy) Elisa Di Francisca	15

==== Épée individual ====
Position	Name	Country
1st place, gold medalist(s)	Violetta Kolobova	Russia
2nd place, silver medalist(s)	Rossella Fiamingo	Italy
3rd place, bronze medalist(s)	Simona Pop	Romania
3rd place, bronze medalist(s)	Emese Szász	Hungary
5.	Ana Maria Brânză	Romania
6.	Marie Florence Candassamy	France
7.	Olena Kryvytska	Ukraine
8.	Tatiana Logunova	Russia

Quarter-finals
(Italy) Rossella Fiamingo	13
(France) Marie Florence Candassamy	12
(Romania) Simona Pop	15
(Russia) Tatiana Logunova	11
(Russia) Violetta Kolobova	13
(Ukraine) Olena Kryvytska	10
(Hungary) Emese Szász	15
(Romania) Ana Maria Branza	10

Semi-finals
(Italy) Rossella Fiamingo	15
(Romania) Simona Pop	9
(Russia) Violetta Kolobova	15
(Hungary) Emese Szász	10

Final
(Italy) Rossella Fiamingo	12
(Russia) Violetta Kolobova	15

==== Sabre individual ====
Position	Name	Country
1st place, gold medalist(s)	Sofiya Velikaya	Russia
2nd place, silver medalist(s)	Charlotte Lembach	France
3rd place, bronze medalist(s)	Rossella Gregorio	Italy
3rd place, bronze medalist(s)	Olena Voronina	Ukraine
5.	Olga Kharlan	Ukraine
6.	Bianca Pascu	Romania
7.	Irene Vecchi	Italy
8.	Yana Egorian	Russia

Quarter-finals
(Ukraine) Olga Kharlan	11
(Italy) Rossella Gregorio	15
(France) Charlotte Lembach	15
(Italy) Irene Vecchi	14
(Romania) Bianca Pascu	14
(Ukraine) Olena Voronina	15
(Russia) Yana Egorian	14
(Russia) Sofiya Velikaya	15

Semi-finals
(Italy) Rossella Gregorio	14
(France) Charlotte Lembach	15
(Ukraine) Olena Voronina	9
(Russia) Sofiya Velikaya	15

Final
(France) Charlotte Lembach	14
(Russia) Sofiya Velikaya	15

==== Foil team ====
Position	Name	Country
1st place, gold medalist(s)	Martina Batini; Arianna Errigo; Elisa di Francisca; Valentina Vezzali	Italy
2nd place, silver medalist(s)	Inna Deriglazova; Yulia Biryukova; Larisa Korobeynikova; Aida Shanaeva	Russia
3rd place, bronze medalist(s)	Anita Blaze; Pauline Ranvier; Astrid Guyart; Ysaora Thibus	France
4.	Carolin Golubytskyi; Anne Sauer; Eva Hampel; Franziska Schmitz	Germany
5.	Martyna Jelińska; Hanna Łyczbińska; Marta Łyczbińska; Martyna Synoradzka	Poland
6.	Olha Leleiko; Alexandra Senyuta; Kateryna Chentsova; Anastasiya Moskovska	Ukraine
7.	Aida Mohamed; Edina Knapek; Gabriella Varga; Szilvia Jeszenszky	Hungary
8.	Maria Boldor; Ana Boldor; Mălina Călugăreanu	Romania

Quarter-finals
Russia	45
Ukraine	23
Hungary	28
Germany	29
France	45
Poland	22
Romania	21
Italy	45

Semi-finals
Russia	45
Germany	20
France	36
Italy	45

Final
Russia	44
Italy	45
Third place
Germany	28
France	45

==== Épée team ====
Position	Name	Country
1st place, gold medalist(s)	Ana Maria Brânză; Simona Gherman; Simona Pop; Loredana Dinu	Romania
2nd place, silver medalist(s)	Irina Embrich; Erika Kirpu; Julia Beljajeva; Katrina Lehis	Estonia
3rd place, bronze medalist(s)	Francesca Boscarelli; Rossella Fiamingo; Bianca Del Carretto; Mara Navarria	Italy
4.	Kinka Barvestad; Johanna Bergdahl; Sanne Gars; Emma Samuelsson	Sweden
5.	Anastasia Ivchenko; Olena Kryvytska; Anfisa Pochkalova; Yana Shemyakina	Ukraine
6.	Edina Antal; Dorina Budai; Anna Kun; Emese Szász	Hungary
7.	Tatyana Gudkova; Violetta Kolobova; Tatyana Logunova; Lyubov Shutova	Russia
8.	Marie-Florence Candassamy; Auriane Mallo; Maureen Nisima; Coraline Vitalis	France

Quarter-finals
Italy	45
Hungary	28
France	30
Estonia	37
Russia	37
Sweden	39
Ukraine	25
Romania	31

Semi-finals
Italy	31
Estonia	43
Sweden	42
Romania	45

Final
Estonia	35
Romania	45
Third place
Italy	45
Sweden	34

==== Sabre team ====
Position	Name	Country
1st place, gold medalist(s)	Ekaterina Dyachenko; Yana Egorian; Yuliya Gavrilova; Sofiya Velikaya	Russia
2nd place, silver medalist(s)	Cécilia Berder; Saoussen Boudiaf; Marion Brunet; Charlotte Lembach	France
3rd place, bronze medalist(s)	Olha Kharlan; Alina Komashchuk; Olena Kravatska; Olena Voronina	Ukraine
4.	Ilaria Bianco; Loreta Gulotta; Irene Vecchi; Rossella Gregorio	Italy
5.	Bogna Jóźwiak; Małgorzata Kozaczuk; Aleksandra Socha; Angelika Wątor	Poland
6.	Alexandra Bujdoso; Sibylle Klemm; Anna Limbach; Ann-Sophie Kindler	Germany
7.	Nóra Garam; Júlia Mikulik; Anna Várhelyi; Anna Márton	Hungary
8.	Sandra Marcos; Lucía Martín-Portugués; Araceli Navarro; Laia Vila	Spain

Quarter-finals
France	45
Germany	34
Hungary	42
Italy	45
Ukraine	45
Poland	40
Spain	23
Russia	45

Semi-finals
France	45
Italy	42
Ukraine	31
Russia	45

Final
France	36
Russia	45
Third place
Italy	30
Ukraine	45
