= 2016 European Fencing Championships =

- Host city: (Poland) Toruń
- Dates: 20–25 June 2016
- Main venue: Arena Toruń
- Website: www.efc2016.eu

The 2016 European Fencing Championships were held in Toruń, Poland from 20 to 25 June 2016 at the Arena Toruń.

== Schedule ==
●	Opening Ceremony	●	Finals	●	Closing Ceremony

June	20	21	22	23	24	25	Total
Ceremonies	●					●	
Foil Individual	Men	Women					2
Épée Individual		Men	Women				2
Sabre Individual	Women		Men				2
Foil Team				Men	Women		2
Épée Team					Men	Women	2
Sabre Team				Women		Men	2
Total Gold Medals	2	2	2	2	2	2	12

== Medal summary ==
=== Men's events ===
Event	Gold	Silver	Bronze
Foil	Timur Safin (RUS)	Erwann Le Péchoux (FRA)	Giorgio Avola (ITA); Andre Sanita (GER)
Épée	Yannick Borel (FRA)	Max Heinzer (SUI)	Jean-Michel Lucenay (FRA); Bohdan Nikishyn (UKR)
Sabre	Benedikt Wagner (GER)	Vincent Anstett (FRA)	Kamil Ibragimov (RUS); Alexey Yakimenko (RUS)
Team Foil	Russia; Artur Akhmatkhuzin; Alexey Cheremisinov; Dmitry Rigin; Timur Safin	Italy; Giorgio Avola; Andrea Baldini; Andrea Cassara; Daniele Garozzo	Great Britain; James-Andrew Davis; Laurence Halsted; Richard Kruse; Marcus Mepstead
Team Épée	France; Yannick Borel; Gauthier Grumier; Daniel Jerent; Jean-Michel Lucenay	Italy; Lorenzo Buzzi; Enrico Garozzo; Paolo Pizzo; Andrea Santarelli	Ukraine; Anatoliy Herey; Dmitriy Karuchenko; Maksym Khvorost; Bohdan Nikishin
Team Sabre	Russia; Dmitriy Danilenko; Kamil Ibragimov; Nikolay Kovalev; Aleksey Yakimenko	Italy; Enrico Berre; Luca Curatoli; Diego Occhiuzzi; Luigi Samele	Romania; Alin Badea; Tiberiu Dolniceanu; Ciprian Galatanu; Iulian Teodosiu

=== Women's events ===
Event	Gold	Silver	Bronze
Foil	Arianna Errigo (ITA)	Aida Shanaeva (RUS)	Larisa Korobeynikova (RUS); Carolin Golubytskyi (GER)
Épée	Simona Gherman (ROU)	Ana Maria Brânză (ROU)	Renata Knapik-Miazga (POL); Emese Szász (HUN)
Sabre	Sofiya Velikaya (RUS)	Anna Márton (HUN)	Olha Kharlan (UKR); Charlotte Lembach (FRA)
Team Foil	Russia; Inna Deriglazova; Larisa Korobeynikova; Aida Shanaeva; Adelina Zagidullina	Italy; Martina Batini; Elisa Di Francisca; Arianna Errigo; Alice Volpi	France; Astrid Guyart; Jeromine Mpah-Njanga; Pauline Ranvier; Ysaora Thibus
Team Épée	Estonia; Julia Beljajeva; Irina Embrich; Erika Kirpu; Kristina Kuusk	France; Marie-Florence Candassamy; Josephine Jacques Andre Coquin; Auriane Mallo; Lauren Rembi	Romania; Loredana Dinu; Simona Gherman; Simona Pop; Ana Maria Brânză
Team Sabre	Russia; Ekaterina Dyachenko; Yana Egorian; Yuliya Gavrilova; Sofiya Velikaya	France; Cecilia Berder; Saoussen Boudiaf; Manon Brunet; Charlotte Lembach	Ukraine; Olha Kharlan; Alina Komashchuk; Olena Kravatska; Olena Voronina

=== Medal table ===
Rank	Nation	Gold	Silver	Bronze	Total
1	Russia	6	1	3	10
2	France	2	4	3	9
3	Italy	1	4	1	6
4	Romania	1	1	2	4
5	Germany	1	0	2	3
6	Estonia	1	0	0	1
7	Hungary	0	1	1	2
8	Switzerland	0	1	0	1
9	Ukraine	0	0	4	4
10	Great Britain	0	0	1	1
10	Poland*	0	0	1	1
Totals (11 entries)		12	12	18	42

Host

== Results ==
=== Men ===
==== Foil individual ====
Position	Name	Country
1st place, gold medalist(s)	Timur Safin	Russia
2nd place, silver medalist(s)	Erwann Le Péchoux	France
3rd place, bronze medalist(s)	Giorgio Avola	Italy
3rd place, bronze medalist(s)	Andre Sanita	Germany
5.	Andrea Cassarà	Italy
6.	Enzo Lefort	France
7.	Laurence Halsted	Great Britain
8.	Klod Yunes	Ukraine

Quarter-finals
(Italy) Andrea Cassarà	8
(France) Erwann Le Péchoux	15
(United Kingdom) Laurence Halsted	8
(Italy) Giorgio Avola	15
(Ukraine) Klod Yunes	14
(Germany) Andre Sanita	15
(France) Enzo Lefort	14
(Russia) Timur Safin	15

Semi-finals
(France) Erwann Le Péchoux	15
(Italy) Giorgio Avola	12
(Germany) Andre Sanita	12
(Russia) Timur Safin	15

Final
(France) Erwann Le Péchoux	9
(Russia) Timur Safin	15

==== Épée individual ====
Position	Name	Country
1st place, gold medalist(s)	Yannick Borel	France
2nd place, silver medalist(s)	Max Heinzer	Switzerland
3rd place, bronze medalist(s)	Jean-Michel Lucenay	France
3rd place, bronze medalist(s)	Bohdan Nikishyn	Ukraine
5.	Frederik Von Der Osten	Denmark
6.	Géza Imre	Hungary
7.	Constantin Boehm	Germany
8.	Vadim Anokhin	Russia

Quarter-finals
(France) Yannick Borel	15
(Denmark) Frederik Von Der Osten	10
(Hungary) Géza Imre	11
(Ukraine) Bohdan Nikishyn	15
(Russia) Vadim Anokhin	10
(France) Jean-Michel Lucenay	15
(Switzerland) Max Heinzer	15
(Germany) Constantin Boehm	12

Semi-finals
(France) Yannick Borel	15
(Ukraine) Bohdan Nikishyn	8
(France) Jean-Michel Lucenay	12
(Switzerland) Max Heinzer	15

Final
(France) Yannick Borel	15
(Switzerland) Max Heinzer	12

==== Sabre individual ====
Position	Name	Country
1st place, gold medalist(s)	Benedikt Wagner	Germany
2nd place, silver medalist(s)	Vincent Anstett	France
3rd place, bronze medalist(s)	Kamil Ibragimov	Russia
3rd place, bronze medalist(s)	Alexey Yakimenko	Russia
5.	Sandro Bazadze	Georgia
6.	Áron Szilágyi	Hungary
7.	Aliaksandr Buikevich	Belarus
8.	Nicolas Rousset	France

Quarter-finals
(Germany) Benedikt Wagner	15
(Belarus) Aliaksandr Buikevich	13
(Russia) Kamil Ibragimov	15
(Hungary) Áron Szilágyi	11
(France) Vincent Anstett	15
(France) Nicolas Rousset	14
(Russia) Alexey Yakimenko	15
(Georgia (country)) Sandro Bazadze	14

Semi-finals
(Germany) Benedikt Wagner	15
(Russia) Kamil Ibragimov	14
(France) Vincent Anstett	15
(Russia) Alexey Yakimenko	13

Final
(Germany) Benedikt Wagner	15
(France) Vincent Anstett	13

==== Foil team ====
Position	Name	Country
1st place, gold medalist(s)	Artur Akhmatkhuzin; Alexey Cheremisinov; Dmitry Rigin; Timur Safin	Russia
2nd place, silver medalist(s)	Giorgio Avola; Andrea Baldini; Andrea Cassara; Daniele Garozzo	Italy
3rd place, bronze medalist(s)	James-Andrew Davis; Laurence Halsted; Richard Kruse; Marcus Mepstead	Great Britain
4.	Jérémy Cadot; Erwann Le Péchoux; Enzo Lefort; Jean-Paul Tony Helissey	France
5.	Marius Braun; Alexander Kahl; Andre Sanita	Germany
6.	Michal Janda; Piotr Janda; Leszek Rajski; Michal Siess	Poland
7.	Rostyslav Hertsyk; Pylyp Kolesnikov; Andrii Pogrebniak; Klod Tunes	Ukraine
8.	Boldizsár Balogh; Dániel Dósa; Bálint Mátyás; András Németh	Hungary

Quarter-finals
Italy	45
Hungary	30
Germany	34
Great Britain	45
Russia	45
Ukraine	29
Poland	38
France	45

Semi-finals
Italy	44
Great Britain	28
Russia	45
France	34

Final
Italy	42
Russia	45
Third place
Great Britain	45
France	28

==== Épée team ====
Position	Name	Country
1st place, gold medalist(s)	Yannick Borel; Gauthier Grumier; Daniel Jerent; Jean-Michel Lucenay	France
2nd place, silver medalist(s)	Lorenzo Buzzi; Enrico Garozzo; Paolo Pizzo; Andrea Santarelli	Italy
3rd place, bronze medalist(s)	Anatoliy Herey; Dmytro Karyuchenko; Maksym Khvorost; Bohdan Nikishin	Ukraine
4.	Peer Borsky; Max Heinzer; Fabian Kauter; Benjamin Steffen	Switzerland
5.	Vadim Anokhin; Anton Avdeev; Sergey Khodos; Pavel Sukhov	Russia
6.	Patrick Jorgensen; Christian Schack Linnemann; Troels Christian Robl; Frederik Von Der Osten	Denmark
7.	Constantin Boehm; Fabian Herzberg; Niklas Multerer; Stephan Rein	Germany
8.	Marno Allika; Nikolai Novosjolov; Sten Priinits; Jüri Salm	Estonia

Quarter-finals
France	45
Estonia	38
Switzerland	44
Denmark	43
Italy	27
Russia	21
Germany	30
Ukraine	45

Semi-finals
France	45
Switzerland	32
Italy	29
Ukraine	28

Final
France	45
Italy	40
Third place
Switzerland	31
Ukraine	45

==== Sabre team ====
Position	Name	Country
1st place, gold medalist(s)	Dmitriy Danilenko; Kamil Ibragimov; Nikolay Kovalev; Aleksey Yakimenko	Russia
2nd place, silver medalist(s)	Enrico Berre; Luca Curatoli; Diego Occhiuzzi; Luigi Samele	Italy
3rd place, bronze medalist(s)	Alin Badea; Tiberiu Dolniceanu; Ciprian Galatanu; Iulian Teodosiu	Romania
4.	Tamás Decsi; Nikolasz Iliasz; András Szatmári; Áron Szilágyi	Hungary
5.	Aliaksandr Buikevich; Artsiom Karabinski; Artsiom Novikau; Siarhei Shachanin	Belarus
6.	Vincent Anstett; Bolade Apithy; Maxence Lambert; Nicolas Rousset	France
7.	Max Hartung; Richard Huebers; Matyas Szabo; Benedikt Wagner	Germany
8.	William Deary; Curtis Miller; Kirk Slankard; Jonathan Webb	Great Britain

Quarter-finals
Russia	45
Great Britain	26
France	42
Romania	45
Germany	39
Italy	45
Belarus	39
Hungary	45

Semi-finals
Russia	45
Romania	32
Italy	45
Hungary	43

Final
Russia	45
Italy	42
Third place
Romania	45
Hungary	32

=== Women ===
==== Foil individual ====
Position	Name	Country
1st place, gold medalist(s)	Arianna Errigo	Italy
2nd place, silver medalist(s)	Aida Shanaeva	Russia
3rd place, bronze medalist(s)	Larisa Korobeynikova	Russia
3rd place, bronze medalist(s)	Carolin Golubytskyi	Germany
5.	Elisa Di Francisca	Italy
6.	Ysaora Thibus	France
7.	Adelina Zagidullina	Russia
8.	Aida Mohamed	Hungary

Quarter-finals
(Italy) Elisa Di Francisca	13
(Russia) Aida Shanaeva	15
(Germany) Carolin Golubytskyi	15
(Hungary) Aida Mohamed	8
(France) Ysaora Thibus	11
(Italy) Arianna Errigo	15
(Russia) Adelina Zagidullina	10
(Russia) Larisa Korobeynikova	15

Semi-finals
(Russia) Aida Shanaeva	15
(Germany) Carolin Golubytskyi	7
(Italy) Arianna Errigo	15
(Russia) Larisa Korobeynikova	10

Final
(Russia) Aida Shanaeva	14
(Italy) Arianna Errigo	15

==== Épée individual ====
Position	Name	Country
1st place, gold medalist(s)	Simona Gherman	Romania
2nd place, silver medalist(s)	Ana Maria Brânză	Romania
3rd place, bronze medalist(s)	Renata Knapik-Miazga	Poland
3rd place, bronze medalist(s)	Emese Szász	Hungary
5.	Monika Sozanska	Germany
6.	Olena Kryvytska	Ukraine
7.	Simona Pop	Romania
8.	Tatiana Logunova	Russia

Quarter-finals
(Germany) Monika Sozanska	10
(Romania) Simona Gherman	13
(Poland) Renata Knapik-Miazga	14
(Ukraine) Olena Kryvytska	13
(Romania) Ana Maria Brânză	15
(Romania) Simona Pop	9
(Russia) Tatiana Logunova	12
(Hungary) Emese Szász	15

Semi-finals
(Romania) Simona Gherman	15
(Poland) Renata Knapik-Miazga	12
(Romania) Ana Maria Brânză	13
(Hungary) Emese Szász	12

Final
(Romania) Simona Gherman	9
(Romania) Ana Maria Brânză	5

==== Sabre individual ====
Position	Name	Country
1st place, gold medalist(s)	Sofiya Velikaya	Russia
2nd place, silver medalist(s)	Anna Márton	Hungary
3rd place, bronze medalist(s)	Charlotte Lembach	France
3rd place, bronze medalist(s)	Olga Kharlan	Ukraine
5.	Yana Egorian	Russia
6.	Aleksandra Socha	Poland
7.	Bianca Pascu	Romania
8.	Nóra Garam	Hungary

Quarter-finals
(Ukraine) Olga Kharlan	15
(Poland) Aleksandra Socha	14
(Hungary) Nóra Garam	13
(Russia) Sofiya Velikaya	15
(Hungary) Anna Márton	15
(Russia) Yana Egorian	9
(France) Charlotte Lembach	15
(Romania) Bianca Pascu	9

Semi-finals
(Ukraine) Olga Kharlan	13
(Russia) Sofiya Velikaya	15
(Hungary) Anna Márton	15
(France) Charlotte Lembach	7

Final
(Russia) Sofiya Velikaya	15
(Hungary) Anna Márton	10

==== Foil team ====
Position	Name	Country
1st place, gold medalist(s)	Inna Deriglazova; Larisa Korobeynikova; Aida Shanaeva; Adelina Zagidullina	Russia
2nd place, silver medalist(s)	Martina Batini; Elisa Di Francisca; Arianna Errigo; Alice Volpi	Italy
3rd place, bronze medalist(s)	Astrid Guyart; Jeromine Mpah-Njanga; Pauline Ranvier; Ysaora Thibus	France
4.	Edina Knapek; Fanny Kreiss; Dóra Lupkovics; Aida Mohamed	Hungary
5.	Martyna Jelińska; Hanna Łyczbińska; Marta Łyczbińska; Martyna Synoradzka	Poland
6.	Leonie Ebert; Carolin Golubytskyi; Eva Hampel; Anne Sauer	Germany
7.	Kateryna Chentsova; Olha Leleiko; Anastasiya Moskovska; Alexandra Senyuta	Ukraine
8.	Gabrielle Gothberg Von Troil; Linn Lofmark; Harriet Rundquist; Ester Schreiber	Sweden

Quarter-finals
Italy	44
Sweden	25
Hungary	43
Germany	32
France	45
Poland	37
Ukraine	16
Russia	45

Semi-finals
Italy	45
Hungary	29
France	30
Russia	45

Final
Italy	38
Russia	45
Third place
Hungary	30
France	45

==== Épée team ====
Position	Name	Country
1st place, gold medalist(s)	Julia Beljajeva; Irina Embrich; Erika Kirpu; Kristina Kuusk	Estonia
2nd place, silver medalist(s)	Marie-Florence Candassamy; Joséphine Coquin; Auriane Mallo; Lauren Rembi	France
3rd place, bronze medalist(s)	Loredana Dinu; Simona Gherman; Ana-Maria Popescu; Simona Pop	Romania
4.	Dorina Budai; Anna Kun; Julianna Révész; Emese Szász	Hungary
5.	Olga Kochneva; Violetta Kolobova; Tatiana Logunova; Lyubov Shutova	Russia
6.	Renata Knapik; Magdalena Piekarska; Barbara Rutz; Aleksandra Zamachowska	Poland
7.	Rossella Fiamingo; Mara Navarria; Giulia Rizzi; Alberta Santuccio	Italy
8.	Olena Kryvytska; Kseniya Pantelyeyeva; Anfisa Pochkalova; Yana Shemyakina	Ukraine

Quarter-finals
Romania	45
Poland	26
France	36
Ukraine	30
Estonia	45
Italy	30
Hungary	27
Russia	26

Semi-finals
Romania	36
France	41
Estonia	39
Hungary	30

Final
France	28
Estonia	33
Third place
Romania	27
Hungary	19

==== Sabre team ====
Position	Name	Country
1st place, gold medalist(s)	Ekaterina Dyachenko; Yana Egorian; Yuliya Gavrilova; Sofya Velikaya	Russia
2nd place, silver medalist(s)	Cecilia Berder; Saoussen Boudiaf; Manon Brunet; Charlotte Lembach	France
3rd place, bronze medalist(s)	Olga Kharlan; Alina Komashchuk; Olena Kravatska; Olena Voronina	Ukraine
4.	Bogna Jóźwiak; Katarzyna Kedziora; Marta Puda; Aleksandra Socha	Poland
5.	Ilaria Bianco; Rossella Gregorio; Loreta Gulotta; Irene Vecchi	Italy
6.	Nóra Garam; Luca László; Anna Márton; Petra Záhonyi	Hungary
7.	Sandra Marcos; Lucia Martin-Portugues; Celia Perez Cuenca; Laia Vila	Spain
8.	Aysel Ahadova; Sevil Bunyatova; Narmina Jafarova; Sabina Mikina	Azerbaijan

Quarter-finals
Russia	45
Spain	35
Hungary	39
Poland	45
France	45
Italy	33
Azerbaijan	23
Ukraine	45

Semi-finals
Russia	45
Poland	35
France	45
Ukraine	40

Final
Russia	45
France	39
Third place
Poland	42
Ukraine	45
