= Diana Yakovleva =

Russian fencer (born 1988)

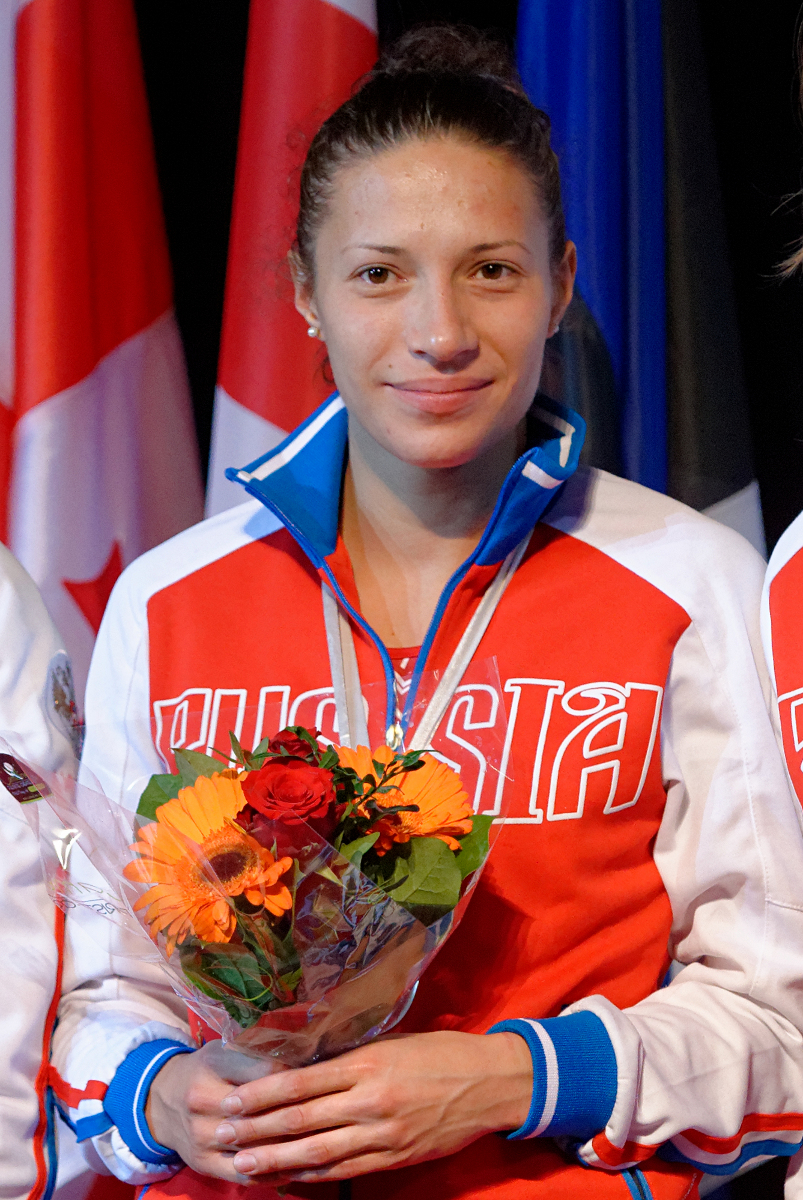
- Yakovleva at the 2014 European Fencing Championships

Personal information
- Full name: Diana Alekseyeva Yakovleva
- Born: 13 April 1988 (age 38) Moscow
- Home town: Moscow
- Height: 1.73 m (5 ft 8 in)
- Weight: 59 kg (130 lb)

Fencing career
- Sport: Fencing
- Weapon: Foil
- Hand: Right-handed
- National coach: Stefano Cerioni
- Club: Moscow Youth
- FIE ranking: current ranking
Medal record
Representing Russia
World Championships
Silver medal – second place	2014 Kazan	Team foil
Bronze medal – third place	2013 Budapest	Team foil
European Championships
Silver medal – second place	2013 Zagreb	Individual foil
Silver medal – second place	2014 Strasbourg	Team foil
European Games
Gold medal – first place	2015 Baku	Team foil

Diana Alekseyeva Yakovleva (Russian: Диана Алексеевна Яковлева; born 13 April 1988) is a Russian foil fencer, silver medal in the 2014 European Fencing Championships and team silver medal in the 2014 World Fencing Championships.

== Career ==
Yakovleva won the team gold medal in the 2006 and 2007 Junior European Championships. She took part in the 2009 Summer Universiade in Belgrade, where she was defeated in quarter-finals, but won the silver medal with Russia. She claimed gold both in the individual and team events of the 2011 U23 European Championships in Kazan.

She joined the senior national team in 2013. She climbed her first World Cup podium with a silver in Shanghai. She reached the final at the European Championships in Zagreb, but ceded to reigning Olympic champion Elisa Di Francisca and came away with a silver medal. She earned a bronze medal in the 2013 Summer Universiade after losing the semi-finals to teammate Larisa Korobeynikova. For her first participation in World Championships she reached the quarter-finals, where she was defeated by teammate Inna Deriglazova. In the team event, Russia were defeated by France in the semi-finals, but prevailed over South Korea to earn the bronze medal. She finished the season No.6 in world rankings.

The 2013–14 season was less successful. She reached the quarter-finals in Saint-Petersbourg and Marseille, but ceded in the first round of the European Championships against France's Ysaora Thibus. In the team event, Russia cruised to the final where they met Italy, which had stayed unvanquished all season. Russia unexpectedly took an early lead, but Italy managed to come back at the end, dooming Russia to a silver medal. In the World Championships at home in Kazan, she sustained a bruise to her knee and was stopped in the second round by Korea's Oh Ha-na. In the team event, Russia met Italy again in the final and were defeated again.

Yakovleva studied at the Russian State University of Physical Education, Sport, Youth and Tourism.
