= Inna Deriglazova =

Russian foil fencer

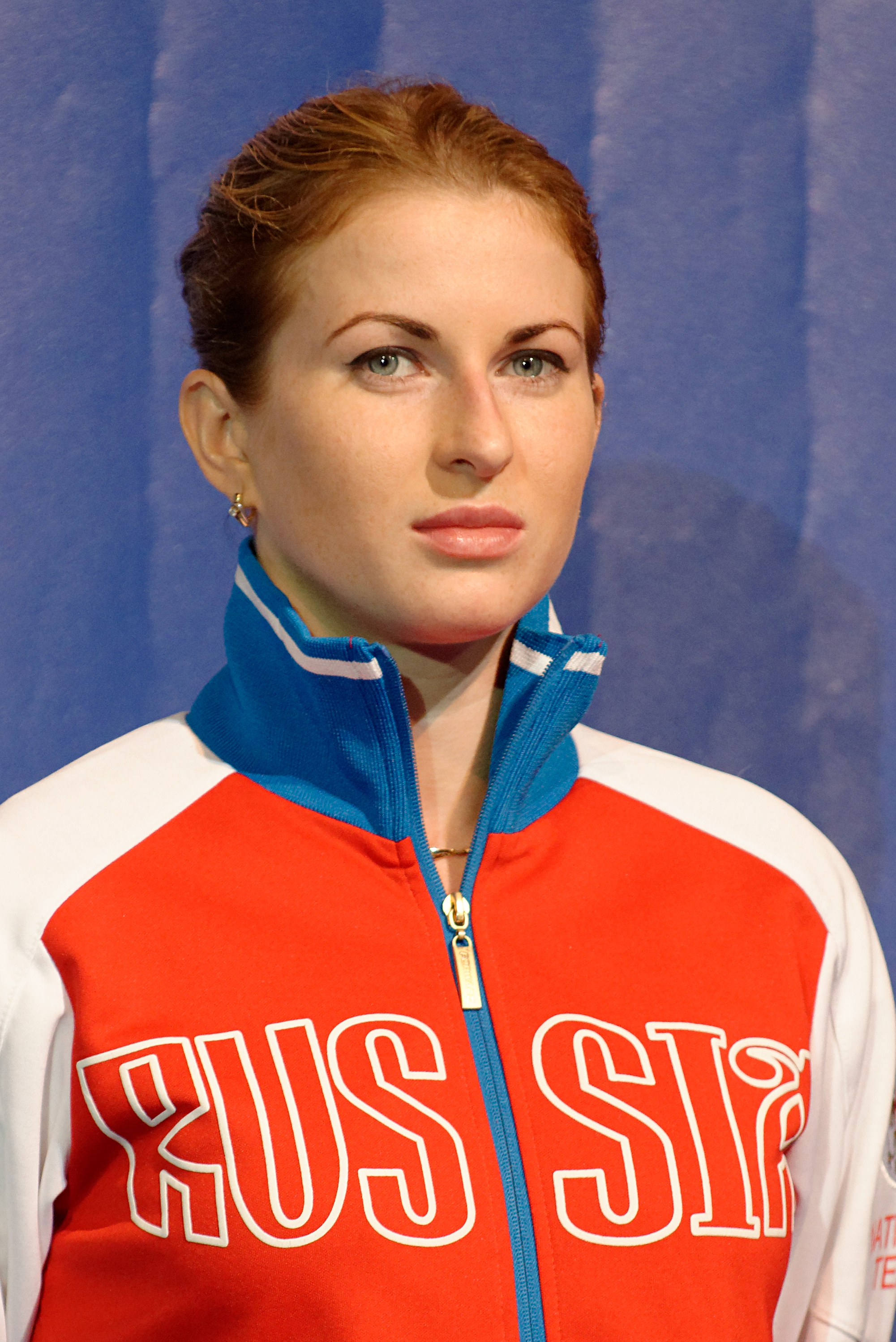
- Deriglazova at the 2013 World Fencing Championships

Personal information
- Full name: Inna Vasilyevna Deriglazova
- Nationality: (Russia) Russian
- Born: 10 March 1990 (age 36) Kurchatov, Kursk Oblast, Russian SFSR, Soviet Union
- Height: 1.74 m (5 ft 9 in)
- Weight: 62 kg (137 lb)

Fencing career
- Sport: Fencing
- Country: Russia
- Weapon: Foil
- Hand: Right-handed
- National coach: vacant
- Club: CSKA Moscow
- Head coach: vacant
- FIE ranking: 13 current ranking
Medal record
Women's fencing
Representing (Russia) ROC
Olympic Games
Gold medal – first place	2020 Tokyo	Team foil
Silver medal – second place	2020 Tokyo	Individual foil
Representing Russia
Olympic Games
Gold medal – first place	2016 Rio de Janeiro	Individual foil
Silver medal – second place	2012 London	Team foil
World Championships
Gold medal – first place	2011 Catania	Team foil
Gold medal – first place	2015 Moscow	Individual foil
Gold medal – first place	2016 Rio de Janeiro	Team foil
Gold medal – first place	2017 Leipzig	Individual foil
Gold medal – first place	2019 Budapest	Individual foil
Gold medal – first place	2019 Budapest	Team foil
Silver medal – second place	2014 Kazan	Team foil
Silver medal – second place	2015 Moscow	Team foil
Bronze medal – third place	2013 Budapest	Individual foil
Bronze medal – third place	2013 Budapest	Team foil
Bronze medal – third place	2017 Leipzig	Team foil
European Championships
Gold medal – first place	2012 Legnano	Individual foil
Gold medal – first place	2016 Toruń	Team foil
Gold medal – first place	2018 Novi Sad	Individual foil
Gold medal – first place	2019 Düsseldorf	Team foil
Silver medal – second place	2011 Sheffield	Team foil
Silver medal – second place	2014 Strasbourg	Team foil
Silver medal – second place	2015 Montreaux	Team foil
Silver medal – second place	2017 Tbilisi	Individual foil
Silver medal – second place	2017 Tbilisi	Team foil
Silver medal – second place	2018 Novi Sad	Team foil
Silver medal – second place	2019 Düsseldorf	Individual foil
Bronze medal – third place	2010 Leipzig	Team foil
Bronze medal – third place	2010 Leipzig	Individual foil
Bronze medal – third place	2012 Legnano	Team foil
Military World Games
Gold medal – first place	2019 Wuhan	Individual foil
Gold medal – first place	2019 Wuhan	Team foil
Summer Universiade
Gold medal – first place	2013 Kazan	Individual foil
Gold medal – first place	2013 Kazan	Team foil

Inna Vasilyevna Deriglazova (Russian: Инна Васильевна Дериглазова, IPA: [ˈinːə dʲɪrʲɪˈɡɫazəvə]; born 10 March 1990) is a Russian right-handed foil fencer.

Deriglazova is a two-time team and two-time individual European champion, and three-time team and three-time individual world champion. A three-time Olympian, Deriglazova is a 2012 team Olympic silver medalist, 2021 team Olympic champion, 2021 individual Olympic silver medalist, and 2016 individual Olympic champion. Deriglazova competed in the 2012 London Olympic Games, the 2016 Rio de Janeiro Olympic Games, and the 2020 Tokyo Olympic Games.

== Career ==
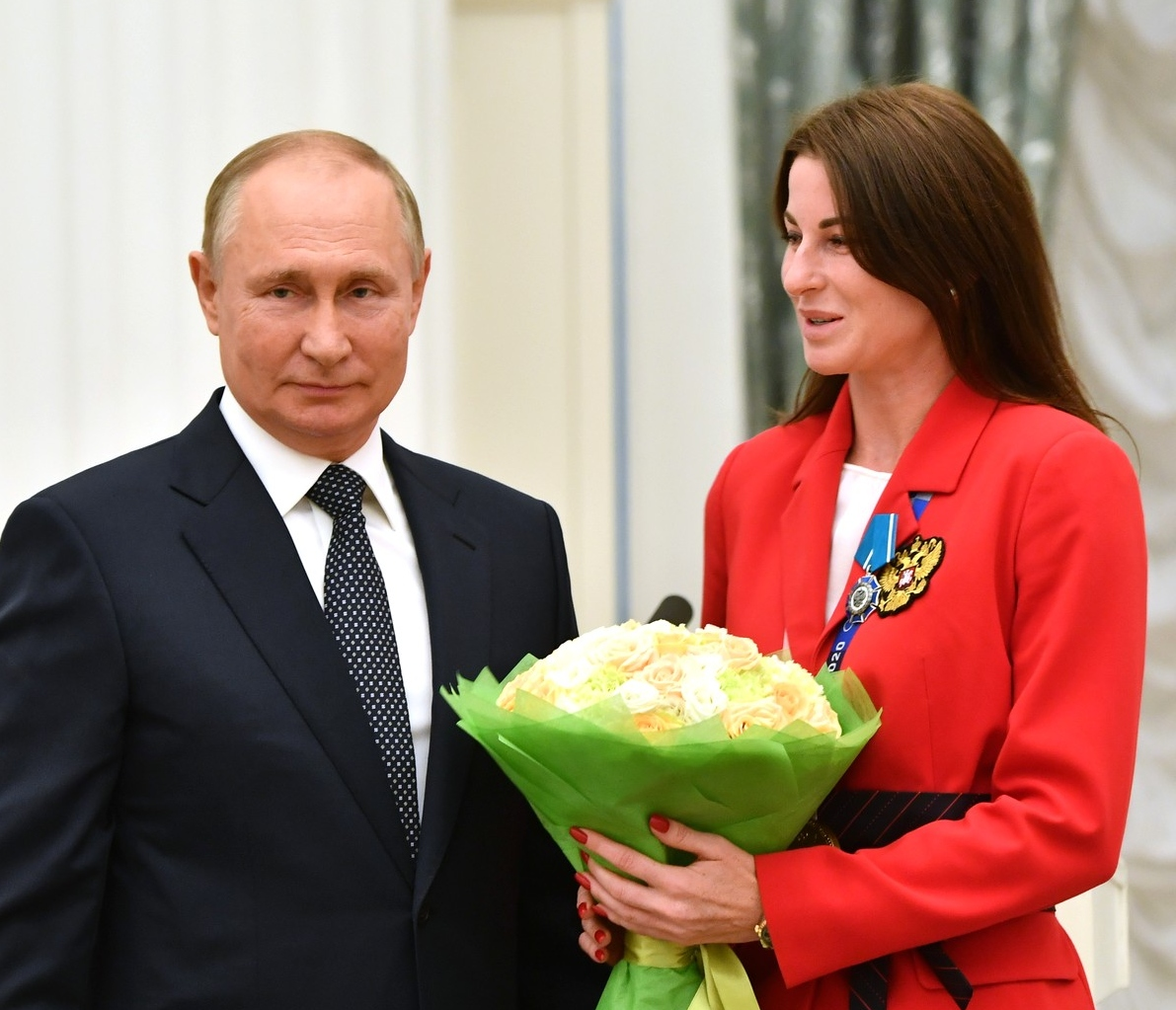
Vladimir Putin and Deriglazova in 2021

Deriglazova began fencing at the age of 8 in hometown Kurchatov. She underwent training under Ildar Mavlyutov. Despite her diminutive frame as a child, she became accustomed to fencing athletes much older than herself. She won a bronze medal at the 2006 Cadet World Championships in Taebaek, followed a year later by the gold medal in the individual and team events at the Cadet World Championships in Novi Sad. The same year, she took the bronze medal in the Junior World Championships at Prague. She became Junior World Champion in Amsterdam in 2008.

Shortly after her world title, Deriglazova married and gave birth to a daughter, Diana. She stopped training just a week before delivery and went back to the piste two weeks afterwards. Two months after giving birth, she earned the silver medal in the Russian national championship. A year after, in 2010, she took the gold in the individual and team event of the Junior World Championships in Baku. The same year, she joined the senior national team and took a bronze medal in the individual and team events of the senior European Championships in Leipzig.

Deriglazova climbed her first World Cup podium in 2011 with a silver medal in Tauberbischofsheim. She was stopped by Korea's Nam Hyun-hee in the table of 16 of the 2011 World Championships in Catania. In the team event, Russia defeated France in the quarter-finals, then Korea to meet the Italian "Dream Team". Russia lost and were doomed to a silver medal. At the 2012 European Championships she defeated reigning Olympic silver medallist Arianna Errigo in the semi-finals and prevailed over teammate Kamilla Gafurzianova to earn her first senior individual title. For her Olympic début at London 2012, she was defeated 8–15 in the second round of the individual event by France's Ysaora Thibus. In the team event Russia got the best of Japan, then of South Korea. They met No.1 rivals Italy in the final. Deriglazova opened the match against five-time Olympic champion Valentina Vezzali and was defeated 2–5. Her teammates could not contain Italy either and Russia were eventually defeated 31–45.

Deriglazova was left extremely frustrated by her Olympic experience and resolved to train harder under the new direction of Stefano Cerioni, former coach of the Italian foil teams. During the 2012–13 season she won her first World Cup title at Budapest, followed by three other victories in Saint-Petersbourg, Tauberbischofsheim and Seoul. Her ambitions for the 2013 European Championships in Zagreb were however cut short in the first round of the individual event by World No.88 Anastasiya Moskovska. In the team event, Russia were defeated by France in the semi-finals, then by Hungary in the match for the bronze medal, and came away with no medal. Deriglazova bounced back by taking the gold medal at the 2013 Summer Universiade after defeating teammate Larisa Korobeynikova in the final. At the World Championships in Budapest Deriglazova made her way to the semi-finals, where she was defeated 15–11 by Arianna Errigo and took the bronze medal. In the team event, Russia were defeated by France in the semi-finals, but prevailed over South Korea to earn the bronze medal.

In the pre-Olympic season of 2015, Deriglazova climbed the podium three times at the World Cups, winning bronze medals in Saint-More, Algeria and Tauberbischofsheim (defeats to Lee Kiefer and twice to Errigo in the semifinals). She also lost twice in the finals of the Grand Prix stages in Havana and Shanghai to Di Francisca, but at the World Championships in Moscow, she interrupted a series of failures by defeating Kiefer in 1/4, Errigo in the semifinals and compatriot Aida Shanaeva in the final, and won the first individual gold medal.

In the Olympic season, she won silver in Turin (lost to Volpi), bronze in Gdańsk (lost to Errigo) and Algeria (lost to Batini), and gold at the last stage in Tauberbischofsheim, defeating Errigo in the final. At the games in Rio, Deriglazova became the Olympic champion, defeating Di Francisca 12:11 in the final.

At the 2019 European Championship in Germany, she lost the final to Italian Elisa Di Francisca and won a silver medal. Three days later she helped the Russian national team win the team championship. However, in the semifinals of the World Championship, she won her third title in individual competitions at the World Championships, defeating Frenchwoman Pauline Ranvier in the final match. In the team championship, she also became the world champion.

At the Olympic Games in Tokyo in July 2021, Deriglazova was the favorite in the individual championship, but won only silver, losing to American Lee Kiefer in the final. A few days later she won gold in the team tournament.

== Medal record ==
=== Olympic Games ===
Year	Location	Event	Position
2012	London, United Kingdom	Team Women's Foil	2nd
2016	Rio de Janeiro, Brazil	Individual Women's Foil	1st
2021	Tokyo, Japan	Individual Women's Foil	2nd
2021	Tokyo, Japan	Team Women's Foil	1st

=== World Championship ===
Year	Location	Event	Position
2011	Catania, Italy	Team Women's Foil	1st
2013	Budapest, Hungary	Individual Women's Foil	3rd
2013	Budapest, Hungary	Team Women's Foil	3rd
2014	Kazan, Russia	Team Women's Foil	2nd
2015	Moscow, Russia	Individual Women's Foil	1st
2015	Moscow, Russia	Team Women's Foil	2nd
2016	Rio de Janeiro, Brazil	Team Women's Foil	1st
2017	Leipzig, Germany	Individual Women's Foil	1st
2017	Leipzig, Germany	Team Women's Foil	3rd
2019	Budapest, Hungary	Individual Women's Foil	1st
2019	Budapest, Hungary	Team Women's Foil	1st

=== European Championship ===
Year	Location	Event	Position
2010	Leipzig, Germany	Individual Women's Foil	3rd
2010	Leipzig, Germany	Team Women's Foil	3rd
2011	Sheffield, United Kingdom	Team Women's Foil	2nd
2012	Legnano, Italy	Individual Women's Foil	1st
2012	Legnano, Italy	Team Women's Foil	3rd
2014	Strasbourg, France	Team Women's Foil	2nd
2015	Montreux, Switzerland	Team Women's Foil	2nd
2016	Toruń, Poland	Team Women's Foil	1st
2017	(Georgia (country)) Tbilisi, Georgia	Individual Women's Foil	2nd
2017	(Georgia (country)) Tbilisi, Georgia	Team Women's Foil	2nd
2018	Novi Sad, Serbia	Individual Women's Foil	1st
2018	Novi Sad, Serbia	Team Women's Foil	2nd
2019	Düsseldorf, Germany	Individual Women's Foil	2nd
2019	Düsseldorf, Germany	Team Women's Foil	1st

=== Grand Prix ===
Date	Location	Event	Position
04/27/2013	Seoul, South Korea	Individual Women's Foil	1st
05/23/2014	Marseille, France	Individual Women's Foil	2nd
03/13/2015	Havana, Cuba	Individual Women's Foil	2nd
05/15/2015	Shanghai, China	Individual Women's Foil	2nd
11/27/2015	Turin, Italy	Individual Women's Foil	2nd
03/17/2017	Long Beach, United States	Individual Women's Foil	3rd
05/19/2017	Shanghai, China	Individual Women's Foil	2nd
12/01/2017	Turin, Italy	Individual Women's Foil	1st
03/17/2018	Anaheim, United States	Individual Women's Foil	1st
05/18/2018	Shanghai, China	Individual Women's Foil	1st
03/16/2019	Anaheim, United States	Individual Women's Foil	1st
05/17/2019	Shanghai, China	Individual Women's Foil	1st
02/07/2020	Turin, Italy	Individual Women's Foil	3rd
03/26/2021	Doha, Qatar	Individual Women's Foil	1st

=== World Cup ===
Date	Location	Event	Position
02/11/2011	Tauberbischofsheim, Germany	Individual Women's Foil	2nd
02/08/2013	Budapest, Hungary	Individual Women's Foil	1st
03/01/2013	Saint Petersburg, Russia	Individual Women's Foil	1st
03/08/2013	Tauberbischofsheim, Germany	Individual Women's Foil	1st
05/03/2013	Shanghai, China	Individual Women's Foil	3rd
02/26/2014	Saint Petersburg, Russia	Individual Women's Foil	3rd
03/21/2014	Turin, Italy	Individual Women's Foil	1st
05/02/2014	Shanghai, China	Individual Women's Foil	2nd
11/07/2014	Saint-Maur-des-Fossés, France	Individual Women's Foil	3rd
02/06/2015	Algiers, Algeria	Individual Women's Foil	3rd
05/01/2015	Tauberbischofsheim, Germany	Individual Women's Foil	3rd
01/15/2016	Gdańsk, Poland	Individual Women's Foil	3rd
02/05/2016	Algiers, Algeria	Individual Women's Foil	3rd
05/20/2016	Tauberbischofsheim, Germany	Individual Women's Foil	1st
11/04/2016	Saint-Maur-des-Fossés, France	Individual Women's Foil	1st
04/28/2017	Tauberbischofsheim, Germany	Individual Women's Foil	3rd
01/12/2018	Katowice, Poland	Individual Women's Foil	1st
02/02/2018	Algiers, Algeria	Individual Women's Foil	3rd
04/27/2018	Tauberbischofsheim, Germany	Individual Women's Foil	1st
11/23/2018	Algiers, Algeria	Individual Women's Foil	3rd
01/11/2019	Katowice, Poland	Individual Women's Foil	1st
01/25/2019	Saint-Maur-des-Fossés, France	Individual Women's Foil	1st
03/01/2019	Cairo, Egypt	Individual Women's Foil	1st
05/03/2019	Tauberbischofsheim, Germany	Individual Women's Foil	1st
12/13/2019	Saint-Maur-des-Fossés, France	Individual Women's Foil	3rd
01/10/2020	Katowice, Poland	Individual Women's Foil	1st
