= 2012 European Fencing Championships =

25th edition Championships held in Legnano, Italy

The 2012 European Fencing Championships was the 25th edition and held in Legnano, Italy. The event took place from June 15–20, 2012.

== Schedule ==
●	Opening Ceremony	●	Finals	●	Closing Ceremony

June	15	16	17	18	19	20	Total
Ceremonies	●					●	
Foil Individual		Men		Women			2
Sabre Individual	Men	Women					2
Épée Individual	Women			Men			2
Foil Team					Men	Women	2
Sabre Team			Men		Women		2
Épée team			Women			Men	2
Total Gold Medals	2	2	2	2	2	2	12

== Medal summary ==
=== Men's events ===
Event	Gold	Silver	Bronze
Foil	Aleksey Cheremisinov (RUS)	Benjamin Kleibrink (GER)	Richard Kruse (GBR); Michał Majewski (POL)
Épée	Pavel Sukhov (RUS)	Nikolai Novosjolov (EST)	Max Heinzer (SUI); Jörg Fiedler (GER)
Sabre	Aleksey Yakimenko (RUS)	Boladé Apithy (FRA)	Aliaksandr Buikevich (BLR); Andriy Yahodka (UKR)
Team Foil	Italy	France	Germany
Team Épée	Switzerland	Hungary	Ukraine
Team Sabre	Russia	Romania	Germany

=== Women's events ===
Event	Gold	Silver	Bronze
Foil	Inna Deriglazova (RUS)	Kamilla Gafurzianova (RUS)	Larisa Korobeynikova (RUS); Arianna Errigo (ITA)
Épée	Simona Alexandru (ROU)	Anca Măroiu (ROU)	Monika Sozanska (GER); Lyubov Shutova (RUS)
Sabre	Olha Kharlan (UKR)	Vassiliki Vougiouka (GRE)	Aleksandra Socha (POL); Marion Stoltz (FRA)
Team Foil	Italy	France	Russia
Team Épée	Russia	Romania	Estonia
Team Sabre	Russia	Ukraine	Italy

=== Medal table ===
Rank	Nation	Gold	Silver	Bronze	Total
1	Russia	7	1	3	11
2	Italy	2	0	2	4
3	Romania	1	3	0	4
4	Ukraine	1	1	2	4
5	Switzerland	1	0	1	2
6	France	0	3	1	4
7	Germany	0	1	4	5
8	Estonia	0	1	1	2
9	Greece	0	1	0	1
9	Hungary	0	1	0	1
11	Poland	0	0	2	2
12	Belarus	0	0	1	1
12	Great Britain	0	0	1	1
Totals (13 entries)		12	12	18	42

== Results overview ==
=== Men ===
==== Foil individual ====
Position	Name	Country
1st place, gold medalist(s)	Aleksey Cheremisinov	Russia
2nd place, silver medalist(s)	Benjamin Kleibrink	Germany
3rd place, bronze medalist(s)	Richard Kruse	Great Britain
3rd place, bronze medalist(s)	Michał Majewski	Poland
5.	Radosław Glonek	Poland
6.	Renal Ganeyev	Russia
7.	Alexander Choupenitch	Czech Republic
8.	André Weßels	Germany

Quarter-finals
(Poland) Radosław Glonek	13
(Russia) Aleksey Cheremisinov	15
(Russia) Renal Ganeyev	4
(United Kingdom) Richard Kruse	15
(Germany) Benjamin Kleibrink	15
(Germany) Andre Wessels	12
(Czech Republic) Alexander Choupenitch	8
(Poland) Michał Majewski	15

Semi-finals
(Russia) Aleksey Cheremisinov	15
(United Kingdom) Richard Kruse	11
(Germany) Benjamin Kleibrink	15
(Poland) Michał Majewski	14

Final
(Russia) Aleksey Cheremisinov	15
(Germany) Benjamin Kleibrink	7

==== Épée individual ====
Position	Name	Country
1st place, gold medalist(s)	BOEZ Pavel Sukhov	Russia
2nd place, silver medalist(s)	Nikolai Novosjol	Estonia
3rd place, bronze medalist(s)	Max Heinzer	Switzerland
3rd place, bronze medalist(s)	Jörg Fiedler	Germany
5.	Paolo Pizzo	Italy
6.	Tomasz Motyk	Poland
7.	Jean-Michel Lucenay	France
8.	Fredrik Backer	Norway

Quarter-finals
(Switzerland) Max Heinzer	15
(Norway) Fredrik Backer	14
(Estonia) Nikolai Novosjolov	15
(France) Jean-Michel Lucenay	14
(Poland) Tomasz Motyka	6
(Germany) Jörg Fiedler	15
(Russia) Pavel Sukhov	15
(Italy) Paolo Pizzo	11

Semi-finals
(Switzerland) Max Heinzer	8
(Estonia) Nikolai Novosjolov	15
(Germany) Jörg Fiedler	8
(Russia) Pavel Sukhov	9

Final
(Estonia) Nikolai Novosjolov	12
(Russia) Pavel Sukhov	15

==== Sabre individual ====
Position	Name	Country
1st place, gold medalist(s)	Aleksey Yakimenko	Russia
2nd place, silver medalist(s)	Boladé Apithy	France
3rd place, bronze medalist(s)	Aliaksandr Buikevich	Belarus
3rd place, bronze medalist(s)	Andriy Yahodka	Ukraine
5.	Diego Occhiuzzi	Italy
6.	Nicolas Limbach	Germany
7.	Tiberiu Dolniceanu	Romania
8.	Luigi Samele	Italy

Quarter-finals
(Russia) Aleksey Yakimenko	15
(Romania) Tiberiu Dolniceanu	13
(Belarus) Aliaksandr Buikevich	15
(Italy) Luigi Samele	8
(Germany) Nicolas Limbach	13
(France) Boladé Apithy	15
(Ukraine) Andriy Yagodka	15
(Italy) Diego Occhiuzzi	14

Semi-finals
(Russia) Aleksey Yakimenko	15
(Belarus) Aliaksandr Buikevich	9
(France) Boladé Apithy	15
(Ukraine) Andriy Yagodka	10

Final
(Russia) Aleksey Yakimenko	15
(France) Boladé Apithy	12

==== Foil team ====
Position	Name	Country
1st place, gold medalist(s)	Valerio Aspromonte; Giorgio Avola; Andrea Cassarà; Andrea Baldini	Italy
2nd place, silver medalist(s)	Enzo Lefort; Erwann Le Péchoux; Victor Sintès	France
3rd place, bronze medalist(s)	Benjamin Kleibrink; Peter Joppich; Sebastian Bachmann; André Weßels	Germany
4.	Aleksey Cheremisinov; Renal Ganeyev; Artur Akhmatkhuzin; Aleksey Khovanskiy	Russia
5.	James-Andrew Davis; Richard Kruse; Husayn Rosowsky; Laurence Halsted	Great Britain
6.	Michał Majewski; Radosław Glonek; Paweł Kawiecki; Leszek Rajski	Poland
7.	Rene Pranz; Moritz Hinterseer; Roland Schlosser; Tobias Hinterseer	Austria
8.	Rostyslav Hertsyk; Volodymyr Koltygo; Andriy Pohrebnyak; Klod Yunes	Ukraine

Quarter-finals
Italy	45
Austria	22
Great Britain	24
Russia	45
France	45
Poland	39
Ukraine	39
Germany	40

Semi-finals
Italy	45
Russia	32
France	45
Germany	31

Final
Italy	45
France	34
Third place
Russia	33
Germany	38

==== Épée team ====
Position	Name	Country
1st place, gold medalist(s)	Fabian Kauter; Max Heinzer; Benjamin Steffen	Switzerland
2nd place, silver medalist(s)	Gábor Boczkó; Géza Imre; Péter Somfai	Hungary
3rd place, bronze medalist(s)	Bohdan Nikishyn; Dmytro Karyuchenko; Maksym Khvorost; Anatoliy Herey	Ukraine
4.	Jean-Michel Lucenay; Ulrich Robeiri; Alexandre Blaszyck; Daniel Jérent	France
5.	Paolo Pizzo; Matteo Tagliariol; Francesco Martinelli; Diego Confalonieri	Italy
6.	Martin Čapek; Jakub Ambrož; Jiří Beran	Czech Republic
7.	Tomasz Motyka; Radosław Zawrotniak; Michal Adámek; Piotr Kruczek	Poland
8.	Pavel Sukhov; Anton Avdeev; Nikita Glazkov; Sergey Bida	Russia

Quarter-finals
France	45
Poland	41
Czech Republic	35
Switzerland	45
Hungary	40
Russia	36
Ukraine	45
Italy	39

Semi-finals
France	29
Switzerland	45
Hungary	45
Ukraine	31

Final
Switzerland	45
Hungary	35
Third place
France	33
Ukraine	38

==== Sabre team ====
Position	Name	Country
1st place, gold medalist(s)	Veniamin Reshetnikov; Aleksey Yakimenko; Nikolay Kovalev; Pavel Bykov	Russia
2nd place, silver medalist(s)	Florin Zalomir; Tiberiu Dolniceanu; Rareș Dumitrescu; Alexandru Sirițeanu	Romania
3rd place, bronze medalist(s)	Max Hartung; Nicolas Limbach; Benedikt Wagner; Matyas Szabo	Germany
4.	Diego Occhiuzzi; Luigi Samele; Giampiero Pastore; Massimiliano Murolo	Italy
5.	Valery Pryiemka; Aliaksandr Buikevich; Aliaksei Likhacheuski; Dmitry Lapkes	Belarus
6.	Dmytro Boyko; Andriy Yahodka; Oleh Shturbabin; Dmytro Pundyk	Ukraine
7.	Nicolas Rousset; Vincent Anstett; Boladé Apithy; Philémon Barruyer	France
8.	Áron Szilágyi; Balázs Lontay; Tamás Decsi; Csaba Norbert Gáll	Hungary

Quarter-finals
Russia	45
Ukraine	31
Hungary	38
Italy	45
Belarus	36
Romania	45
France	43
Germany	45

Semi-finals
Russia	45
Italy	36
Romania	45
Germany	34

Final
Russia	45
Romania	42
Third place
Italy	43
Germany	45

=== Women ===
==== Foil individual ====
Position	Name	Country
1st place, gold medalist(s)	Inna Deriglazova	Russia
2nd place, silver medalist(s)	Kamilla Gafurzianova	Russia
3rd place, bronze medalist(s)	Larisa Korobeynikova	Russia
3rd place, bronze medalist(s)	Arianna Errigo	Italy
5.	Elisa Di Francisca	Italy
6.	Aida Shanaeva	Russia
7.	Valentina Vezzali	Italy
8.	Ysaora Thibus	France

Quarter-finals
(Italy) Elisa Di Francisca	11
(Russia) Larisa Korobeynikova	15
(France) Ysaora Thibus	11
(Russia) Kamilla Gafurzianova	15
(Italy) Valentina Vezzali	6
(Italy) Arianna Errigo	15
(Russia) Inna Deriglazova	15
(Russia) Aida Shanaeva	8

Semi-finals
(Russia) Larisa Korobeynikova	8
(Russia) Kamilla Gafurzianova	15
(Italy) Arianna Errigo	14
(Russia) Inna Deriglazova	15

Final
(Russia) Kamilla Gafurzianova	8
(Russia) Inna Deriglazova	15

==== Épée individual ====
Position	Name	Country
1st place, gold medalist(s)	Simona Alexandru	Romania
2nd place, silver medalist(s)	Anca Măroiu	Romania
3rd place, bronze medalist(s)	Monika Sozanska	Germany
3rd place, bronze medalist(s)	Lubov Shutova	Russia
5.	Britta Heidemann	Germany
6.	Violetta Kolobova	Russia
7.	Laura Flessel-Colovic	France
8.	Anna Sivkova	Russia

Quarter-finals
(Russia) Lubov Shutova	15
(France) Laura Flessel-Colovic	6
(Russia) Violetta Kolobova	14
(Romania) Simona Alexandru	15
(Germany) Britta Heidemann	9
(Germany) Monika Sozanska	10
(Romania) Anca Măroiu	15
(Russia) Anna Sivkova	14

Semi-finals
(Russia) Lubov Shutova	13
(Romania) Simona Alexandru	15
(Germany) Monika Sozanska	13
(Romania) Anca Măroiu	15

Final
(Romania) Simona Alexandru	15
(Romania) Anca Măroiu	6

==== Sabre individual ====
Position	Name	Country
1st place, gold medalist(s)	Olha Kharlan	Ukraine
2nd place, silver medalist(s)	Vassiliki Vougiouka	Greece
3rd place, bronze medalist(s)	Aleksandra Socha	Poland
3rd place, bronze medalist(s)	Marion Stoltz	France
5.	Ilaria Bianco	Italy
6.	Bogna Jóźwiak	Poland
7.	Julia Gavrilova	Russia
8.	Araceli Navarro	Spain

Quarter-finals
(Greece) Vassiliki Vougiouka	15
(Poland) Bogna Jóźwiak	12
(France) Marion Stoltz	15
(Italy) Ilaria Bianco	12
(Russia) Julia Gavrilova	13
(Poland) Aleksandra Socha	15
(Spain) Araceli Navarro	9
(Ukraine) Olha Kharlan	15

Semi-finals
(Greece) Vassiliki Vougiouka	15
(France) Marion Stoltz	9
(Poland) Aleksandra Socha	9
(Ukraine) Olha Kharlan	15

Final
(Greece) Vassiliki Vougiouka	14
(Ukraine) Olha Kharlan	15

==== Foil team ====
Position	Name	Country
1st place, gold medalist(s)	Valentina Vezzali; Arianna Errigo; Elisa Di Francisca; Ilaria Salvatori	Italy
2nd place, silver medalist(s)	Corinne Maîtrejean; Ysaora Thibus; Astrid Guyart; Anita Blaze	France
3rd place, bronze medalist(s)	Inna Deriglazova; Aida Shanaeva; Kamilla Gafurzianova; Larisa Korobeynikova	Russia
4.	Martyna Synoradzka; Anna Rybicka; Małgorzata Wojtkowiak; Sylwia Gruchała	Poland
5.	Gabriella Varga; Aida Mohamed; Fanny Kreiss; Edina Knapek	Hungary
6.	Sandra Bingenheimer; Anne Sauer; Katja Wächter; Martina Zacke	Germany
7.	Kateryna Chentsova; Olena Khismatulina; Olha Leleiko; Anastasiya Moskovska	Ukraine
8.	Anna Bentley; Martina Emanuel; Natalia Sheppard; Sophie Troiano	Great Britain

Quarter-finals
Italy	45
Ukraine	26
Hungary	35
Poland	38
France	45
Germany	30
Great Britain	2
Russia	5

Semi-finals
Italy	45
Poland	31
France	45
Russia	43

Final
Italy	45
France	28
Third place
Poland	31
Russia	38

==== Épée team ====
Position	Name	Country
1st place, gold medalist(s)	Violetta Kolobova; Tatiana Logunova; Lyubov Shutova; Anna Sivkova	Russia
2nd place, silver medalist(s)	Ana Maria Brânză; Loredana Dinu; Simona Gherman; Anca Măroiu	Romania
3rd place, bronze medalist(s)	Julia Beljajeva; Irina Embrich; Erika Kirpu; Kristina Kuusk	Estonia
4.	Olena Kryvytska; Kseniya Pantelyeyeva; Anfisa Pochkalova; Yana Shemyakina	Ukraine
5.	Bianca Del Carretto; Rossella Fiamingo; Nathalie Moellhausen; Mara Navarria	Italy
6.	Imke Duplitzer; Britta Heidemann; Ricarda Multerer; Monika Sozanska	Germany
7.	Edina Antal; Dorina Budai; Emese Szász; Emese Takacs	Hungary
8.	Johanna Bergdahl; Sanne Gars; Emma Samuelsson; Nina Westman	Sweden

Quarter-finals
Romania	40
Sweden	32
Estonia	45
Germany	35
Italy	41
Ukraine	42
Hungary	31
Russia	43

Semi-finals
Romania	45
Estonia	37
Ukraine	33
Russia	45

Final
Romania	41
Russia	42
Third place
Estonia	34
Ukraine	32

==== Sabre team ====
Position	Name	Country
1st place, gold medalist(s)	Yekaterina Dyachenko; Dina Galiakbarova; Yuliya Gavrilova; Sofiya Velikaya	Russia
2nd place, silver medalist(s)	Olha Kharlan; Olena Khomrova; Halyna Pundyk; Olha Zhovnir	Ukraine
3rd place, bronze medalist(s)	Ilaria Bianco; Alessandra Lucchino; Gioia Marzocca; Irene Vecchi	Italy
4.	Bogna Jóźwiak; Katarzyna Kedziora; Małgorzata Kozaczuk; Aleksandra Socha	Poland
5.	Cécilia Berder; Charlotte Lembach; Flora Palu; Marion Stoltz	France
6.	Aida Alasgarova; Sevil Bunyatova; Sevinj Bunyatova; Sabina Mikina	Azerbaijan
7.	Réka Benkő; Anna Márton; Anna Várhelyi; Kata Várhelyi	Hungary
8.	Jasmin Bührle; Alexandra Bujdoso; Sibylle Klemm; Stefanie Kubissa	Germany

Quarter-finals
Russia	45
Azerbaijan	29
Germany	32
Poland	45
Italy	45
France	34
Hungary	34
Ukraine	45

Semi-finals
Russia	45
Poland	33
Italy	42
Ukraine	45

Final
Russia	45
Ukraine	37
Third place
Poland	39
Italy	45
