= Corinne Maîtrejean =

French fencer (born 1979)

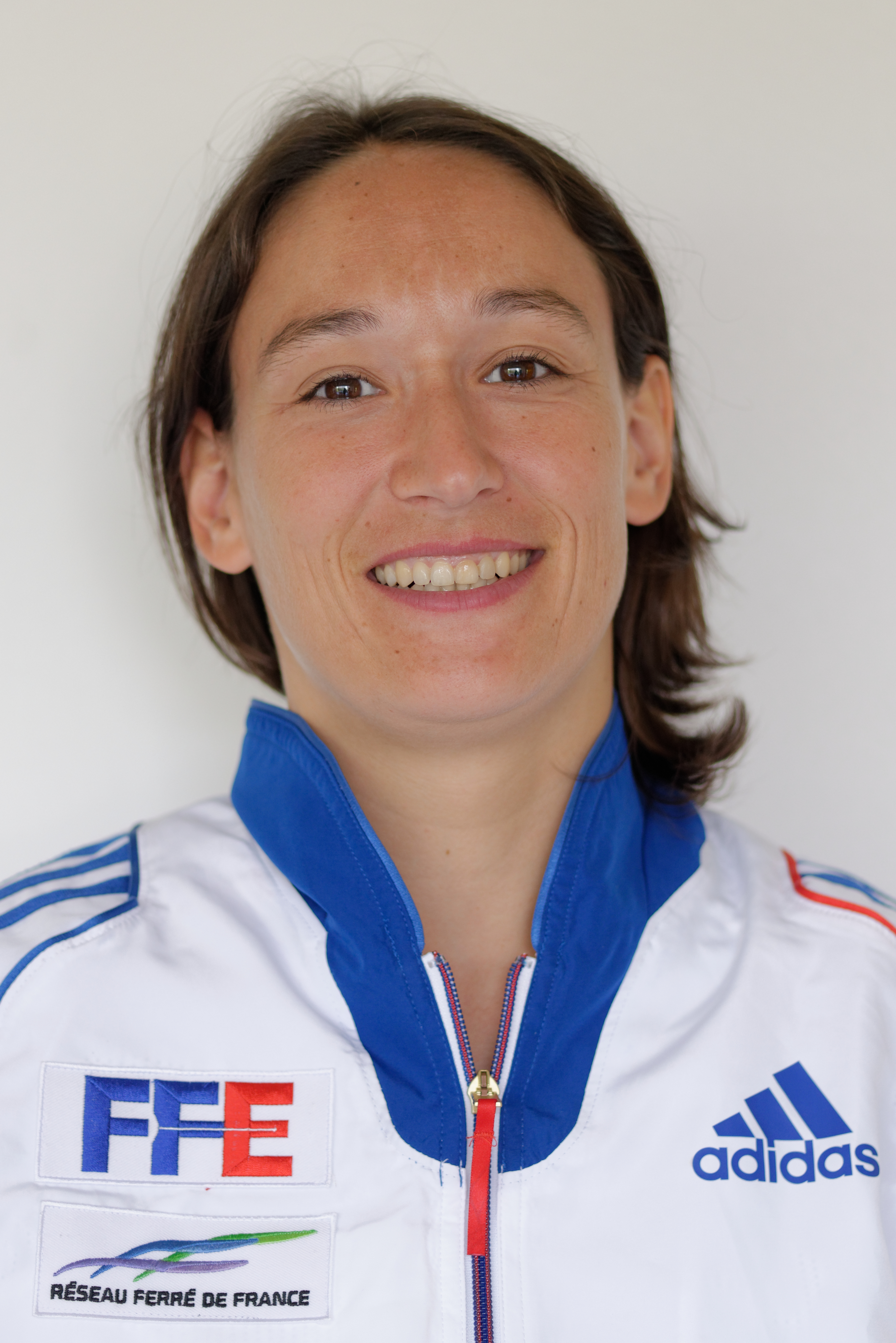

Medal record

Women's fencing

Representing France

World Championships
Silver medal – second place	2013 Budapest	Team foil
Bronze medal – third place	2014 Kazan	Team foil

European Championships
Silver medal – second place	2012 Legnano	Team foil
Silver medal – second place	2013 Zagreb	Team foil
Bronze medal – third place	2014 Strasbourg	Team foil

Corinne Maîtrejean (born 8 November 1979 in Tassin-la-Demi-Lune, Rhône) is a French foil fencer who won a bronze medal in the foil team event of the 2005 World Fencing Championships in Leipzig with her teammates Adeline Wuillème, Céline Seigneur and Astrid Guyart. In 2013, she was part of the French team that won team silver in the World Championships, with Anita Blaze, Astrid Guyart and Ysaora Thibus. She is right-handed. She lives in Aubervilliers.

She competed at the 2008 Olympics in Beijing and at the 2012 Olympics in London as part of France's fencing squad.
