= Women's team foil at the 2015 World Fencing Championships =

The Women's team foil event of the 2015 World Fencing Championships was held on 19 July 2015.

== Medalists ==
Gold	Italy; Martina Batini; Elisa Di Francisca; Arianna Errigo; Valentina Vezzali
Silver	Russia; Yuliya Biryukova; Inna Deriglazova; Larisa Korobeynikova; Aida Shanayeva
Bronze	France; Anita Blaze; Astrid Guyart; Pauline Ranvier; Ysaora Thibus

== Draw ==
=== Finals ===
Semi-finals
Russia	45
France	41
Hungary	18
Italy	45

Final
Russia	36
Italy	45
Bronze medal match
France	37
Hungary	36

=== Top half ===
Round of 32
17	Kazakhstan	36
16	Australia	37

Round of 16
1	Russia	45
16	Australia	4
9	Canada	22
8	Poland	43
5	France	45
12	Ukraine	34
13	Hong Kong	28
4	South Korea	45

Quarterfinals
1	Russia	45
8	Poland	38
5	France	45
4	South Korea	41

Semifinals
1	Russia	45
5	France	41

=== Bottom half ===
Round of 32
15	Venezuela	43
18	Spain	44

Round of 16
3	United States	45
14	Mexico	27
11	Hungary	45
6	Germany	39
7	China	37
10	Japan	38
18	Spain	13
2	Italy	45

Quarterfinals
3	United States	35
11	Hungary	45
10	Japan	25
2	Italy	45

Semifinals
11	Hungary	18
2	Italy	45

=== Placement rounds ===
==== 5–8th place ====
5–8th place semifinals
Poland	36
South Korea	45
United States	45
Japan	33

Fifth place
South Korea	41
United States	40
Seventh place
Poland	44
Japan	45

==== 9–16th place ====
9–16th place quarterfinals
Australia	14
Canada	45
Ukraine	45
Hong Kong	28
Mexico	38
Germany	43
China	42
Spain	30

9–12th place semifinals
Canada	45
Ukraine	25
Germany	38
China	45

Ninth place
Canada	36
China	43
Eleventh place
Ukraine	45
Germany	26

==== 13–16th place ====
13–16th place semifinals
Australia	15
Hong Kong	45
Mexico	45
Spain	33

13th place
Hong Kong	45
Mexico	29
15th place
Australia	23
Spain	45

== Final classification ==
Rank	Nation
1st place, gold medalist(s)	Italy
2nd place, silver medalist(s)	Russia
3rd place, bronze medalist(s)	France
4	Hungary
5	South Korea
6	United States
7	Japan
8	Poland
9	China
10	Canada
11	Ukraine
12	Germany
13	Hong Kong
14	Mexico
15	Spain
16	Australia
17	Venezuela
18	Kazakhstan
