= Women's team foil at the 2016 World Fencing Championships =

The Women's team foil event of the 2016 World Fencing Championships was held from 25 to 26 April 2016.

== Medalists ==
Gold	Russia; Inna Deriglazova; Larisa Korobeynikova; Aida Shanayeva; Adelina Zagidullina
Silver	Italy; Martina Batini; Elisa Di Francisca; Arianna Errigo; Valentina Vezzali
Bronze	France; Gaëlle Gebet; Astrid Guyart; Pauline Ranvier; Ysaora Thibus

== Results ==
=== Championship bracket ===
Round of 16
China	45
Canada	40
France	45
Brazil	20
Colombia	17
United States	45
Japan	26
Germany	45
Hungary	43
Poland	42

Quarterfinals
Italy	45
China	18
France	45
United States	44
South Korea	35
Germany	31
Hungary	31
Russia	45

Semifinals
Italy	45
France	36
South Korea	38
Russia	43

Final
Italy	39
Russia	45
Third place
France	45
South Korea	18

=== 5–8th place bracket ===
5–8th place semifinals
China	32
United States	45
Germany	42
Hungary	45

Fifth place
United States	45
Hungary	40
Seventh place
China	45
Germany	25

=== 9–12th place bracket ===
9–12th place semifinals
Canada	45
Brazil	29
Japan	25
Poland	45

Ninth place
Canada	45
Poland	36
Eleventh place
Brazil	45
Japan	43

== Final ranking ==
Rank	Team
Gold medal	Russia
Silver medal	Italy
Bronze medal	France
4	South Korea
5	United States
6	Hungary
7	China
8	Germany
9	Canada
10	Poland
11	Brazil
12	Japan
13	Colombia
