= Women's team foil at the 2013 World Fencing Championships =

The Women's team foil event of the 2013 World Fencing Championships was held on August 10, 2013.

== Medalists ==
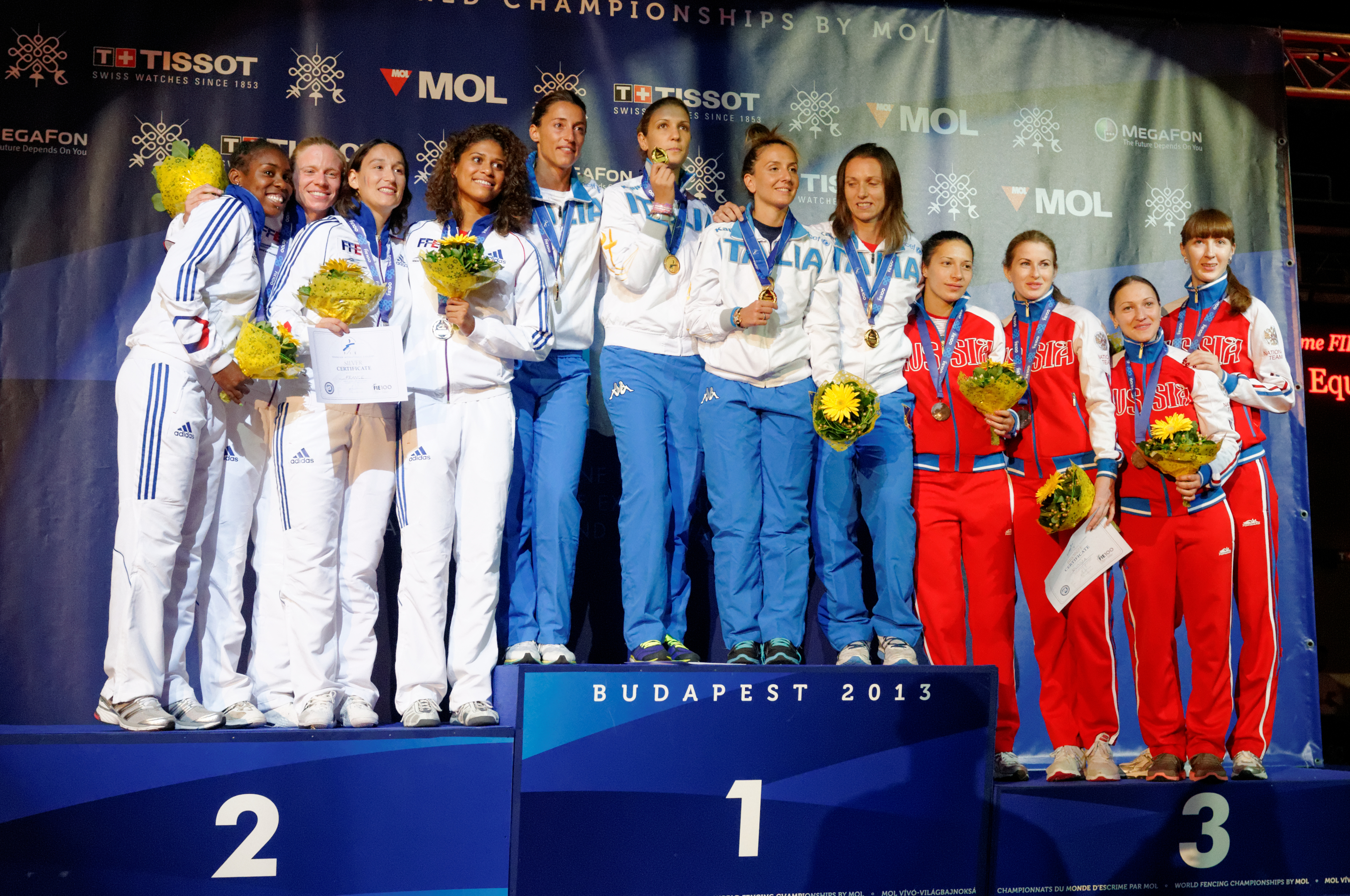
On the podium: from left to right, France, Italy, and Russia

Gold	Italy; Elisa Di Francisca; Carolina Erba; Arianna Errigo; Valentina Vezzali
Silver	France; Anita Blaze; Astrid Guyart; Corinne Maîtrejean; Ysaora Thibus
Bronze	Russia; Yuliya Biryukova; Inna Deriglazova; Larisa Korobeynikova; Diana Yakovleva

== Draw ==
=== Finals ===
Final
1	Italy	45
2	France	18

Third place
1	South Korea	38
2	Russia	45

=== Top half ===
Round of 32
Brazil	45
Singapore	32

Round of 16
Italy	45
Brazil	12
China	40
Germany	39
United States	38
Ukraine	40
Hong Kong	24
South Korea	45

Quarterfinals
Italy	45
China	20
Ukraine	28
South Korea	38

Semifinals
Italy	45
South Korea	19

=== Bottom half ===
Round of 32
Venezuela	45
Australia	13

Round of 16
France	45
Mexico	26
Hungary	35
Poland	44
Japan	31
Canada	45
Venezuela	18
Russia	45

Quarterfinals
France	45
Poland	29
Canada	21
Russia	45

Semifinals
France	45
Russia	42

=== Placement rounds ===
==== 5–8th place ====
5–8th place semifinals
China	39
Ukraine	45
Poland	45
Canada	35

5th place
Ukraine	33
Poland	45
7th place
China	40
Canada	45

==== 9–16th place ====
9–16th place quarterfinals
Brazil	29
Germany	45
United States	45
Hong Kong	28
Mexico	32
Hungary	45
Japan	45
Venezuela	28

9–13th place semifinals
Germany	45
United States	31
Hungary	45
Japan	21

9th place
Germany	45
Hungary	41
11th place
United States	45
Japan	32

==== 13–16th place ====
13–16th place semifinals
Brazil	42
Hong Kong	45
Mexico	44
Venezuela	42

13th place
Hong Kong	35
Mexico	41
15th place
Brazil	45
Venezuela	44

== Final classification ==
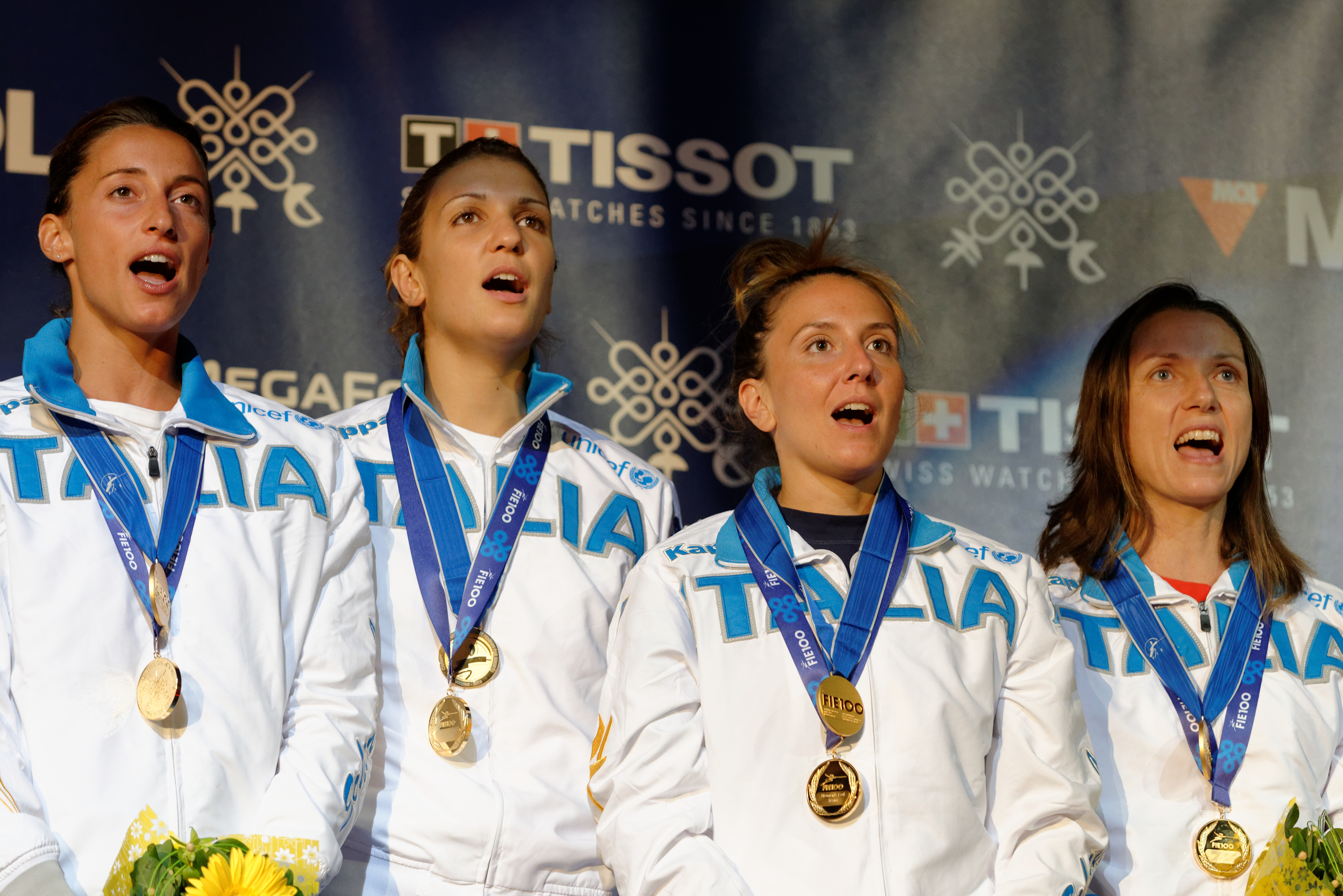
2013 World team champion Italy

Rank	Nation
1st place, gold medalist(s)	Italy
2nd place, silver medalist(s)	France
3rd place, bronze medalist(s)	Russia
4	South Korea
5	Poland
6	Ukraine
7	Canada
8	China
9	Germany
10	Hungary
11	United States
12	Japan
13	Mexico
14	Hong Kong
15	Brazil
16	Venezuela
17	Singapore
18	Australia
