= Women's team foil at the 2014 World Fencing Championships =

The Women's team foil event of the 2014 World Fencing Championships was held from 21–22 July 2014.

== Medalists ==
Gold	Italy; Martina Batini; Elisa Di Francisca; Arianna Errigo; Valentina Vezzali
Silver	Russia; Yulia Biryukova; Inna Deriglazova; Larisa Korobeynikova; Diana Yakovleva
Bronze	France; Astrid Guyart; Corinne Maîtrejean; Ysaora Thibus

== Draw ==
=== Finals ===
Final
Italy	45
Russia	39

Third place
South Korea	35
France	45

=== Top half ===
Round of 32
Australia	17
Brazil	45

Round of 16
Italy	45
Brazil	21
Germany	45
Canada	34
Poland	45
Japan	42
Hong Kong	24
South Korea	45

Quarterfinals
Italy	45
Germany	22
Poland	34
South Korea	45

Semifinals
Italy	45
South Korea	23

=== Bottom half ===
Round of 32
Venezuela	45
South Africa	7

Round of 16
France	45
Mexico	16
Ukraine	29
United States	45
China	45
Hungary	39
Venezuela	17
Russia	45

Quarterfinals
France	45
United States	29
China	30
Russia	45

Semifinals
France	37
Russia	45

=== Placement rounds ===
==== 5–8th place ====
5–8th place semifinals
Germany	28
Poland	21
United States	43
China	45

5th place
Germany	45
China	32
7th place
Poland	42
United States	45

==== 9–16th place ====
9–16th place quarterfinals
Brazil	18
Canada	45
Japan	45
Hong Kong	31
Mexico	34
Ukraine	45
Hungary	45
Venezuela	28

9–12th place semifinals
Canada	42
Japan	43
Ukraine	45
Hungary	35

9th place
Japan	45
Ukraine	42
11th place
Canada	45
Hungary	44

==== 13–16th place ====
13–16th place semifinals
Brazil	45
Hong Kong	40
Mexico	32
Venezuela	33

13th place
Brazil	45
Venezuela	23
15th place
Hong Kong	42
Mexico	45

== Final classification ==
Rank	Nation
1st place, gold medalist(s)	Italy
2nd place, silver medalist(s)	Russia
3rd place, bronze medalist(s)	France
4	South Korea
5	Germany
6	China
7	United States
8	Poland
9	Japan
10	Ukraine
11	Canada
12	Hungary
13	Brazil
14	Venezuela
15	Mexico
16	Hong Kong
17	Australia
18	South Africa
