= Ildar Shaymardanov =

Ildar Ravilovich Shaymardanov (Russian: Ильдар Равилович Шаймарданов) is a Soviet and Russia's swordsman. Champion of the USSR 1986–1991's championship team in foil fencing. Russian first championship winner in the men's foil (1993). Master of sports of international class of Russia (2004). Honored coach of Russia (2013).

Ildar Shaymardanov started coaching in 1997. He was a coach of Kamilla Gafurzianova. At the Olympic Games in London, she took silver in the team foil.

At the present time - Vice-President of the FFR, senior coach of the Russian team in the reserve (women's foil), director of the Sports School Fencing Tatarstan.
