= Marno Allika =

Estonian fencer (born 1982)

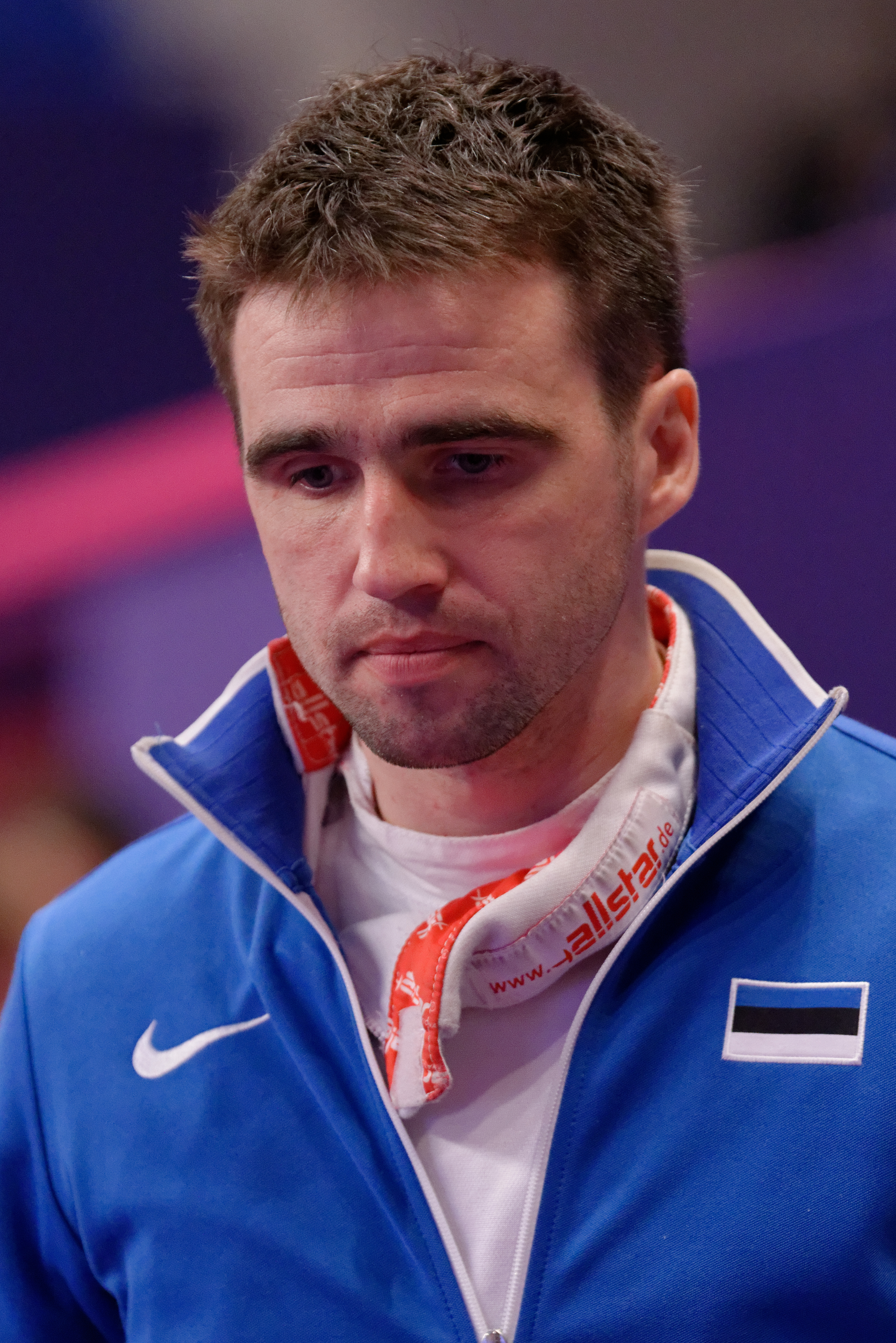
Marno Allika

Marno Allika (born 18 February 1982) is an Estonian fencer.

He was born in Haapsalu. In 2004 he graduated from Estonian Maritime Academy in hydrography.

He began his fencing career in 1989, coached by Endel Nelis. Later his coach was Hardo Lehis. He won a silver medal at 2015 European Fencing Championships in team épée. He is multiple-times Estonian champion. Since 2006 he is a member of Estonian national fencing team.
