= Kamilla Gafurzianova =

Russian fencer

Personal information
- Full name: Kamilla Yusufovna Gafurzianova
- Born: 18 May 1988 (age 38) Kazan, Russian SFSR, Soviet Union

Sport
- Sport: Fencing
- Event: Foil
- Coached by: Ildar Shaymardanov
Medal record
Women's fencing
Representing Russia
Olympic Games
Silver medal – second place	2012 London	Team foil
European Fencing Championships
Silver medal – second place	2012 Legano	Individual foil

Kamilla Yusufovna Gafurzianova (Russian: Камилла Юсуфовна Гафурзянова; born 18 May 1988 in Kazan) is a Russian female fencer. (Note: "Kamilla Gafurzianova". London2012.com. The London Organising Committee of the Olympic Games and Paralympic Games Limited.) At the 2012 Summer Olympics she competed in the women's foil event, being defeated 7–15 in the third round by Arianna Errigo, the eventual silver medalist. She was part of the Russian team that won silver in the team foil. In 2012, she also won the silver in the women's foil at the European Championships.

She uses left hand. She began fencing in 2004.

Awarded of Medal of the Order "For Merit to the Fatherland" 1st class.
