= Ysaora Thibus =

French foil fencer (born 1991)

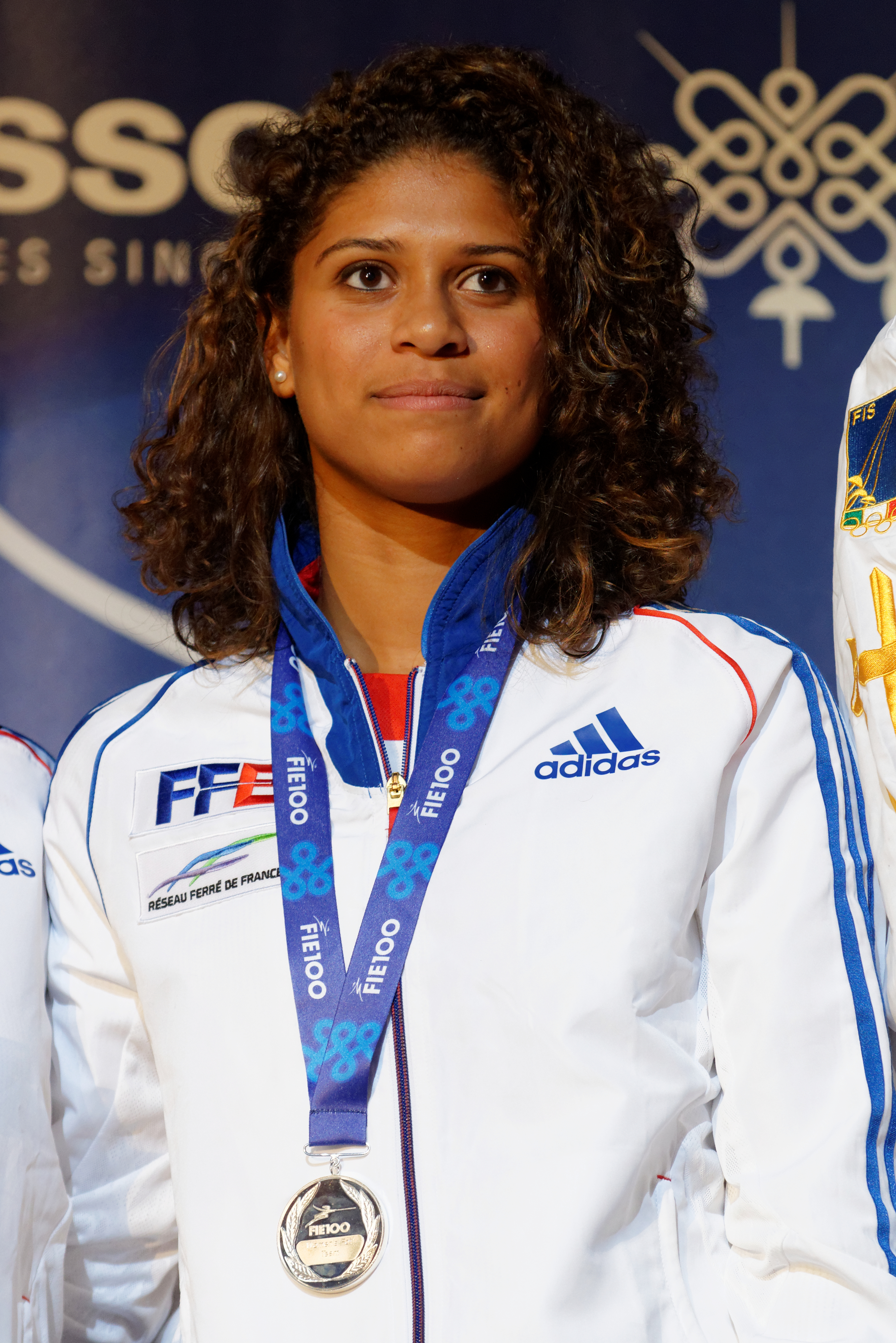
- Thibus at the French Fencing Championship 2013

Personal information
- Nationality: French
- Born: 22 August 1991 (age 35) Les Abymes, Guadeloupe
- Height: 1.74 m (5 ft 9 in)
- Weight: 56 kg (123 lb)

Fencing career
- Sport: Fencing
- Country: France
- Weapon: Foil
- Club: AS Bourg-la-Reine
- FIE ranking: current ranking
Medal record
Women's foil
Representing France
Olympic Games
Silver medal – second place	2020 Tokyo	Team
World Championships
Gold medal – first place	2022 Cairo	Individual
Silver medal – second place	2013 Budapest	Team
Silver medal – second place	2018 Wuxi	Individual
Silver medal – second place	2023 Milan	Team
Bronze medal – third place	2014 Kazan	Team
Bronze medal – third place	2015 Moscow	Team
Bronze medal – third place	2016 Rio de Janeiro	Team
Bronze medal – third place	2017 Leipzig	Individual
Bronze medal – third place	2018 Wuxi	Team
Bronze medal – third place	2022 Cairo	Team
European Games
Silver medal – second place	2023 Kraków–Małopolska	Team
European Championships
Silver medal – second place	2012 Legnano	Team
Silver medal – second place	2013 Zagreb	Team
Silver medal – second place	2019 Düsseldorf	Team
Silver medal – second place	2022 Antalya	Team
Silver medal – second place	2023 Kraków	Team
Silver medal – second place	2026 Antony	Team
Bronze medal – third place	2013 Zagreb	Individual
Bronze medal – third place	2014 Strasbourg	Team
Bronze medal – third place	2015 Montreux	Team
Bronze medal – third place	2016 Torún	Team
Bronze medal – third place	2017 Tbilisi	Individual
Bronze medal – third place	2018 Novi Sad	Team
Bronze medal – third place	2019 Düsseldorf	Individual
Bronze medal – third place	2022 Antalya	Individual
Universiade
Bronze medal – third place	2011 Shenzhen	Team

Ysaora Jennifer Thibus (born 22 August 1991) is a French right-handed foil fencer, 2022 individual world champion, three-time Olympian, and 2020 team Olympic silver medalist.

== Career ==
Ysaora Thibus is studying at the ESCP Business School. In 2013, she received the Bernard Destremau Prize from the Académie des Sciences Morales et Politiques, which rewards a high-level athlete who combines competition and higher education.

Thibus took up fencing at the age of 7 in Guadeloupe. At 17, she moved to France to train with the French national youth team in Aix-en-Provence, joining the senior training team in Paris a year later.

Thibus competed in the 2012 London Olympic Games. In 2016, after winning her first team bronze medal at the Rio Worlds in April, she participated in the 2016 Rio de Janeiro Olympic Games.

She reached her first individual world podium in 2017 in Leipzig with a third place, then in 2018 in Wuxi where she lost 12–15 in the final to Alice Volpi.

In 2021, she won a silver medal in the team foil event with Anita Blaze, Astrid Guyart and Pauline Ranvier at the Tokyo Olympic Games, losing in the final to the Russian team. Beaten in the second round in individual, she said she was "psychologically exhausted" after the Olympic competition and stopped training for four months.

In February 2024, Thibus was issued with a provisional suspension after testing positive for ostarine at the Challenge International de Paris event in January. Following due process, in May 2024 the International Fencing Federation deemed that Thibus bore "no fault or negligence" for the anti-doping rule violation. They accepted her explanation that the source of the ostarine was through kissing her partner Race Imboden whom she was unaware had been using the ostarine. Therefore, other than disqualification of results from the event in Paris, Thibus received no sanction. An appeal by WADA to the decision was dismissed by the Court of Arbitration for Sport in July 2025.

At the Paris Olympics in 2024, Thibus lost her first match in the women's individual foil and was a member of the French team in the team foil event where they placed fifth.

== Personal life ==
Thibus founded the EssentiElle program for women athletes, which aims to amplify their voices within the world of athletics.

From around 2021 Thibus was in a long-term relationship and engaged to American foil fencer Race Imboden, however as of 2025 they appear to have split up.

== Medal record ==
=== Olympic Games ===
Year	Location	Event	Position
2021	Tokyo, Japan	Team Women's Foil	2nd

=== World Championship ===
Year	Location	Event	Position
2013	Budapest, Hungary	Team Women's Foil	2nd
2014	Kazan, Russia	Team Women's Foil	3rd
2015	Moscow, Russia	Team Women's Foil	3rd
2016	Rio de Janeiro, Brazil	Team Women's Foil	3rd
2017	Leipzig, Germany	Individual Women's Foil	3rd
2018	Wuxi, China	Individual Women's Foil	2nd
2018	Wuxi, China	Team Women's Foil	3rd
2022	Cairo, Egypt	Individual Women's Foil	1st

=== European Championship ===
Year	Location	Event	Position
2012	Legnano, Italy	Team Women's Foil	2nd
2013	Zagreb, Croatia	Individual Women's Foil	3rd
2013	Zagreb, Croatia	Team Women's Foil	2nd
2014	Strasbourg, France	Team Women's Foil	3rd
2015	Montreux, Switzerland	Team Women's Foil	3rd
2016	Toruń, Poland	Team Women's Foil	3rd
2017	(Georgia (country)) Tbilisi, Georgia	Individual Women's Foil	3rd
2018	Novi Sad, Serbia	Team Women's Foil	3rd
2019	Düsseldorf, Germany	Individual Women's Foil	3rd
2019	Düsseldorf, Germany	Team Women's Foil	2nd

=== Grand Prix ===
Date	Location	Event	Position
2015-03-13	Havana, Cuba	Individual Women's Foil	3rd
2016-06-03	Shanghai, China	Individual Women's Foil	3rd
2017-05-19	Shanghai, China	Individual Women's Foil	3rd
2020-02-07	Turin, Italy	Individual Women's Foil	1st
2021-03-26	Doha, Qatar	Individual Women's Foil	3rd

=== World Cup ===
Date	Location	Event	Position
2013-02-08	Budapest, Hungary	Individual Women's Foil	3rd
2013-03-01	St. Petersburg, Russia	Individual Women's Foil	3rd
2014-05-02	Shanghai, China	Individual Women's Foil	3rd
2015-01-16	Gdańsk, Poland	Individual Women's Foil	3rd
2015-10-16	Cancún, Mexico	Individual Women's Foil	1st
2017-01-13	Algier, Algeria	Individual Women's Foil	1st
2019-01-25	Saint-Maur-des-Fossés, France	Individual Women's Foil	3rd
2019-05-03	Tauberbischofsheim, Germany	Individual Women's Foil	3rd
2019-11-22	Cairo, Egypt	Individual Women's Foil	3rd
2020-01-10	Katowice, Poland	Individual Women's Foil	3rd

== Awards ==
- Knight of the National Order of Merit (France) on 8 September 2021.
