= Yuliya Biryukova =

Russian foil fencer

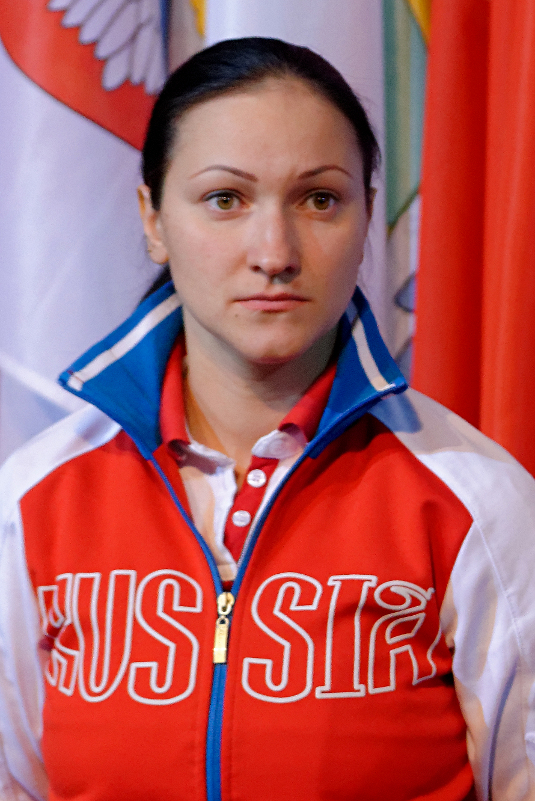
- Biryukova at the 2014 European Fencing Championships

Personal information
- Full name: Yuliya Sergeeva Biryukova
- Nationality: Russian
- Born: 17 March 1985 (age 41) Kurchatov, Kursk Oblast, Russia
- Height: 1.58 m (5 ft 2 in)
- Weight: 53 kg (117 lb)

Fencing career
- Sport: Fencing
- Weapon: Foil
- Hand: Left-handed
- National coach: Stefano Cerioni
- Personal coach: Ildar Mavlyutov
- FIE ranking: current ranking
Medal record
World Championships
Silver medal – second place	2009 Antalya	Team foil
Silver medal – second place	2014 Kazan	Team foil
Silver medal – second place	2015 Moscow	Team foil
Bronze medal – third place	2013 Budapest	Team foil
European Championships
Silver medal – second place	2009 Plovdiv	Team foil
Silver medal – second place	2014 Strasbourg	Team foil
Bronze medal – third place	2014 Strasbourg	Individual foil

Yuliya Sergeeva Biryukova (Russian: Юлия Сергеевна Бирюкова; born 17 March 1985) is a Russian foil fencer.

== Biography ==
Biryukova took up fencing at the age of six in her native Kurchatov. She won the gold medal at the 2007 Summer Universiade in Bangkok.

In the senior category, she climbed her first World Cup podium in the 2008–09 season with a silver medal in Gdańsk. She won a team silver medal at the European Championships in Plovdiv. At the World Championships in Antalya she was defeated in the quarter-finals by team-mate Aida Shanayeva, who eventually won the gold medal. In the team event Russia stumbled against Italy in the final and came away with another silver medal.

Biryukova took an individual bronze medal and a team silver medal in the 2011 Summer Universiade, and another team silver in the 2013 edition. The same year, she won a team bronze medal at the World Championships in Budapest. In the 2013–14 season she won her first major individual title with a bronze medal at the European Championships in Strasbourg. She went on to win a second world team silver medal in the World Championships at home in Moscow.
