= Larisa Korobeynikova =

Russian fencer (born 1987)

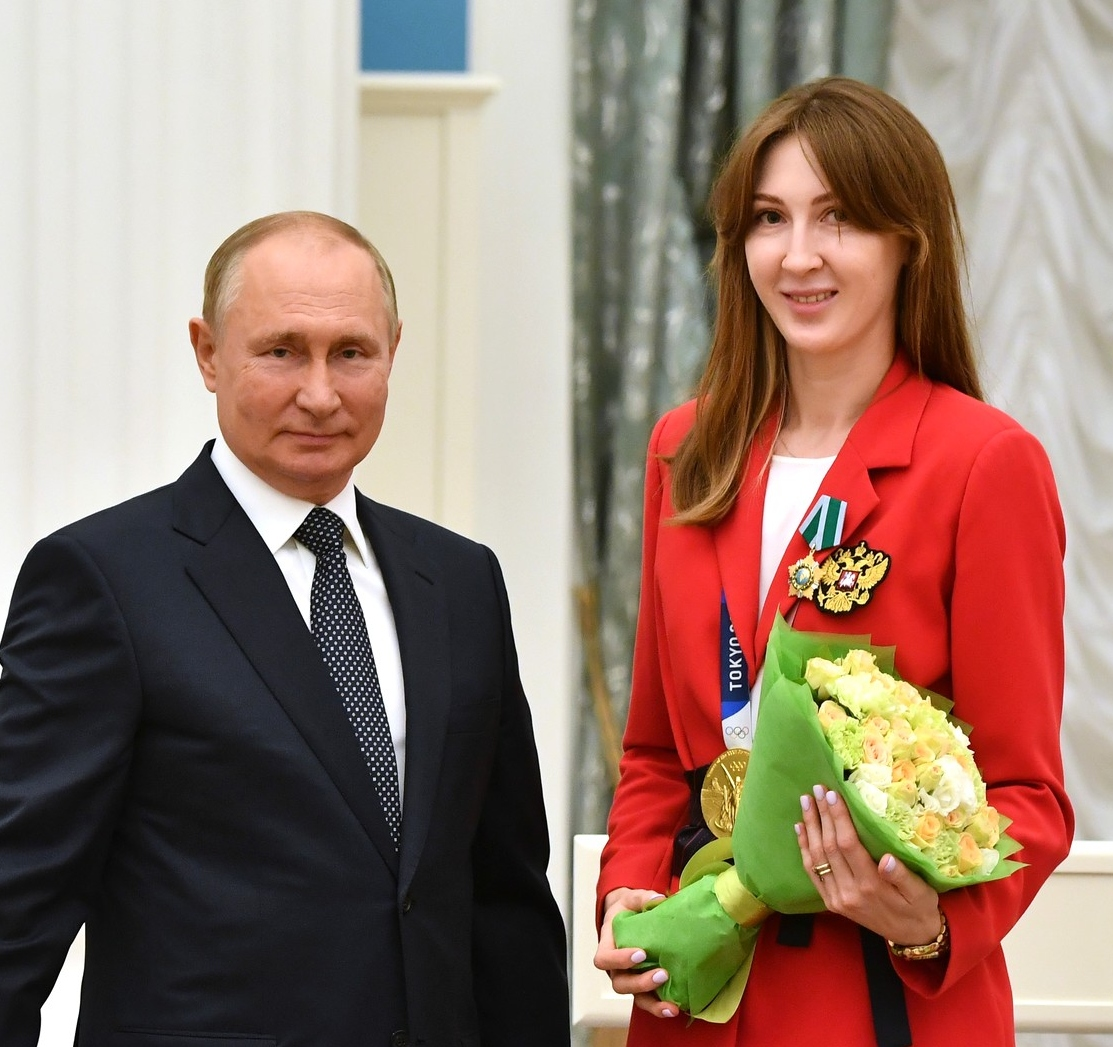
- Vladimir Putin and Korobeynikova, 2021

Personal information
- Native name: Лариса Викторовна Коробейникова
- Full name: Larisa Viktorovna Korobeynikova
- Nationality: (Russia) Russian
- Born: 26 March 1987 (age 39) Kurgan, Kurgan Oblast, Russian SFSR, USSR (now the Russian Federation)
- Height: 1.81 m (5 ft 11 in)
- Weight: 63 kg (139 lb)

Fencing career
- Sport: Fencing
- Country: Russia
- Weapon: Foil
- Hand: Right-handed
- National coach: (Italy) Stefano Cerioni
- Club: Dynamo Rostov
- Head coach: (Russia) Vladimir Ivanov
- FIE ranking: current ranking
Medal record
Representing (Russia) ROC
Olympic Games
Gold medal – first place	2020 Tokyo	Team foil
Bronze medal – third place	2020 Tokyo	Individual foil
Representing Russia
Olympic Games
Silver medal – second place	2012 London	Team foil
World Championships
Gold medal – first place	2011 Catania	Team foil
Gold medal – first place	2016 Rio de Janeiro	Team foil
Gold medal – first place	2019 Budapest	Team foil
Silver medal – second place	2009 Antalya	Team foil
Silver medal – second place	2014 Kazan	Team foil
Silver medal – second place	2015 Moscow	Team foil
Bronze medal – third place	2013 Budapest	Team foil
European Championships
Gold medal – first place	2016 Toruń	Team foil
Gold medal – first place	2019 Düsseldorf	Team foil
Silver medal – second place	2011 Sheffield	Team foil
Silver medal – second place	2014 Strasbourg	Team foil
Silver medal – second place	2015 Montreux	Individual foil
Silver medal – second place	2015 Montreux	Team foil
Bronze medal – third place	2012 Legnano	Individual foil
Bronze medal – third place	2012 Legnano	Team foil
Bronze medal – third place	2016 Toruń	Individual foil
Universiade
Gold medal – first place	2013 Kazan	Team foil
Silver medal – second place	2009 Belgrade	Team foil
Silver medal – second place	2013 Kazan	Individual foil

Larisa Viktorovna Korobeynikova (Russian: Лариса Викторовна Коробейникова, IPA: [ɫɐˈrʲisə kərɐˈbʲeɪ̯nʲɪkəvə]; born 26 March 1987) is a Russian right-handed foil fencer, 2021 team Olympic champion, 2021 individual Olympic bronze medalist, three-time team world champion and two-time team European champion. She received the Medal of the Order "For Merit to the Fatherland" I class in 2012.

== Medal record ==
=== Olympic Games ===
Year	Location	Event	Position
2021	Tokyo, Japan	Individual Women's Foil	3rd
2021	Tokyo, Japan	Team Women's Foil	1st

=== World Championship ===
Year	Location	Event	Position
2009	Antalya, Turkey	Team Women's Foil	2nd
2011	Catania, Italy	Team Women's Foil	1st
2013	Budapest, Hungary	Team Women's Foil	3rd
2014	Kazan, Russia	Team Women's Foil	2nd
2015	Moscow, Russia	Team Women's Foil	2nd
2016	Rio de Janeiro, Brazil	Team Women's Foil	1st
2019	Budapest, Hungary	Team Women's Foil	1st

=== European Championship ===
Year	Location	Event	Position
2010	Leipzig, Germany	Team Women's Foil	3rd
2011	Sheffield, United Kingdom	Team Women's Foil	2nd
2012	Legnano, Italy	Individual Women's Foil	3rd
2012	Legnano, Italy	Team Women's Foil	3rd
2014	Strasbourg, France	Team Women's Foil	2nd
2015	Montreux, Switzerland	Individual Women's Foil	2nd
2015	Montreux, Switzerland	Team Women's Foil	2nd
2016	Toruń, Poland	Individual Women's Foil	3rd
2016	Toruń, Poland	Team Women's Foil	1st
2019	Düsseldorf, Germany	Team Women's Foil	1st

=== Grand Prix ===
Date	Location	Event	Position
01/31/2014	Gdańsk, Poland	Individual Women's Foil	3rd
03/16/2019	(United States) Anaheim, California	Individual Women's Foil	3rd

=== World Cup ===
Date	Location	Event	Position
02/23/2008	Leipzig, Germany	Individual Women's Foil	2nd
02/06/2010	Belgrade, Serbia	Individual Women's Foil	1st
02/08/2013	Budapest, Hungary	Individual Women's Foil	2nd
03/01/2013	St. Petersburg, Russia	Individual Women's Foil	2nd
03/22/2013	Turin, Italy	Individual Women's Foil	3rd
05/03/2013	Shanghai, China	Individual Women's Foil	1st
