= Martyna Synoradzka =

Polish fencer (born 1988)

Personal information
- Nationality: Poland
- Born: 30 January 1988 (age 38) Poznań
- Height: 1.82 m (6 ft 0 in)
- Weight: 68 kg (150 lb)

Fencing career
- Sport: Fencing
- Weapon: foil
- Hand: left-handed
- Club: AZS AWF Poznan
- FIE ranking: current ranking
Medal record
European Championships
Silver medal – second place	2024 Basel	Team
Bronze medal – third place	2018 Novi Sad	Individual
Military World Games
Bronze medal – third place	2019 Wuhan	Team

Martyna Synoradzka (born 30 January 1988 in Poznań) is a Polish female fencer. At the 2012 Summer Olympics she competed in Women's foil. She was defeated 8–15 by Russia's Kamilla Gafurzianova in the table of 32. She was part of the Polish women's foil team that finished in 5th place.

She began fencing at the age of 11, following in the footsteps of her brother.
