= Astrid Guyart =

French fencer (born 1983)

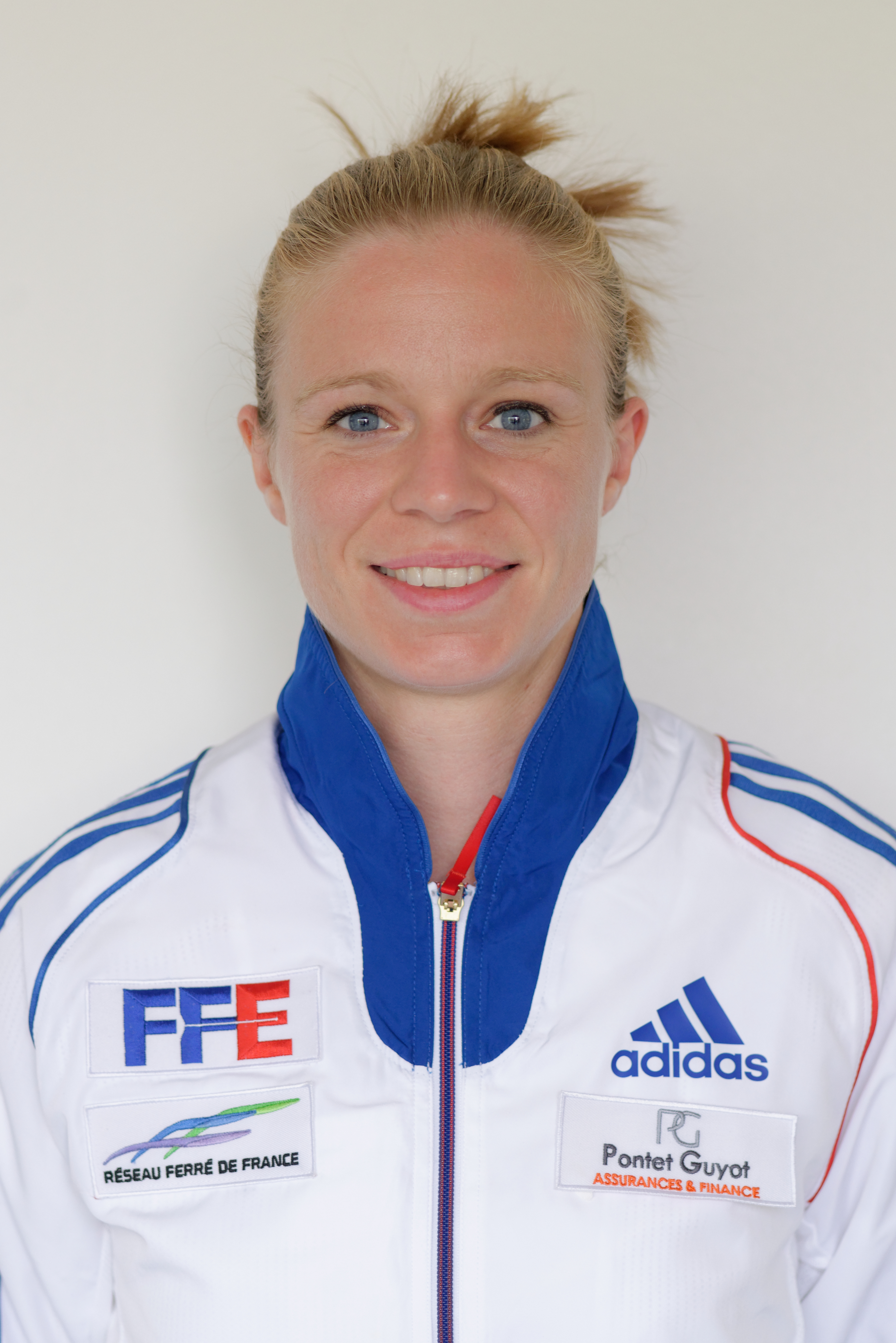
- Guyart in 2013

Personal information
- Born: 17 March 1983 (age 43) Suresnes, France
- Height: 1.74 m (5 ft 9 in)
- Weight: 51 kg (112 lb)

Fencing career
- Sport: Fencing
- Country: France
- Weapon: Foil
- Hand: right-handed
- National coach: Franck Boidin
- FIE ranking: current
Medal record
Olympic Games
Silver medal – second place	2020 Tokyo	Team
World Championships
Silver medal – second place	2013 Budapest	Team
Bronze medal – third place	2005 Leipzig	Team
Bronze medal – third place	2014 Kazan	Team
Bronze medal – third place	2015 Moscow	Team
Bronze medal – third place	2016 Rio de Janeiro	Team
Bronze medal – third place	2018 Wuxi	Team
European Championships
Silver medal – second place	2012 Legnano	Team
Silver medal – second place	2013 Zagreb	Team
Bronze medal – third place	2009 Plovdiv	Team
Bronze medal – third place	2014 Strasbourg	Team
Mediterranean Games
Gold medal – first place	2005 Almería	Individual

Astrid Guyart (born 17 March 1983) is a French right-handed foil fencer, author, and aerospace engineer.

A three-time Olympian, Guyart is a 2021 team Olympic silver medalist.

She is the younger sister of foil fencer and Olympic champion Brice Guyart. She is openly lesbian and was among the six French LGBT athletes featured in the documentary We Need to Talk.

In 2021 she became co-president of the French National Olympic and Sports Committee's Athletes' Commission alongside archer, Romain Girouille.

== Medal record ==
=== Olympic Games ===
Year	Location	Event	Position
2021	Tokyo, Japan	Team Women's Foil	2nd

=== Grand Prix ===
Date	Location	Event	Position
04/28/2012	Marseille, France	Individual Women's Foil	3rd
05/19/2012	Seoul, South Korea	Individual Women's Foil	3rd
02/01/2013	Gdańsk, Poland	Individual Women's Foil	2nd
04/27/2013	Seoul, South Korea	Individual Women's Foil	2nd

=== World Cup ===
Date	Location	Event	Position
06/19/2010	New York, United States	Individual Women's Foil	2nd
05/06/2011	Shanghai, China	Individual Women's Foil	3rd
05/04/2012	Shanghai, China	Individual Women's Foil	1st
06/03/2012	St. Petersburg, Russia	Individual Women's Foil	3rd
03/22/2013	Turin, Italy	Individual Women's Foil	3rd
01/16/2015	Gdańsk, Poland	Individual Women's Foil	1st
02/03/2017	Gdańsk, Poland	Individual Women's Foil	3rd

=== Mediterranean Games ===
Year	Location	Event	Position
2005	Almería, Spain	Individual Women's Foil	1st
