= Women's épée at the 2013 World Fencing Championships =

The Women's épée event of the 2013 World Fencing Championships will be held on August 8, 2013. The qualification was held on August 5, 2013.

== Medalists ==
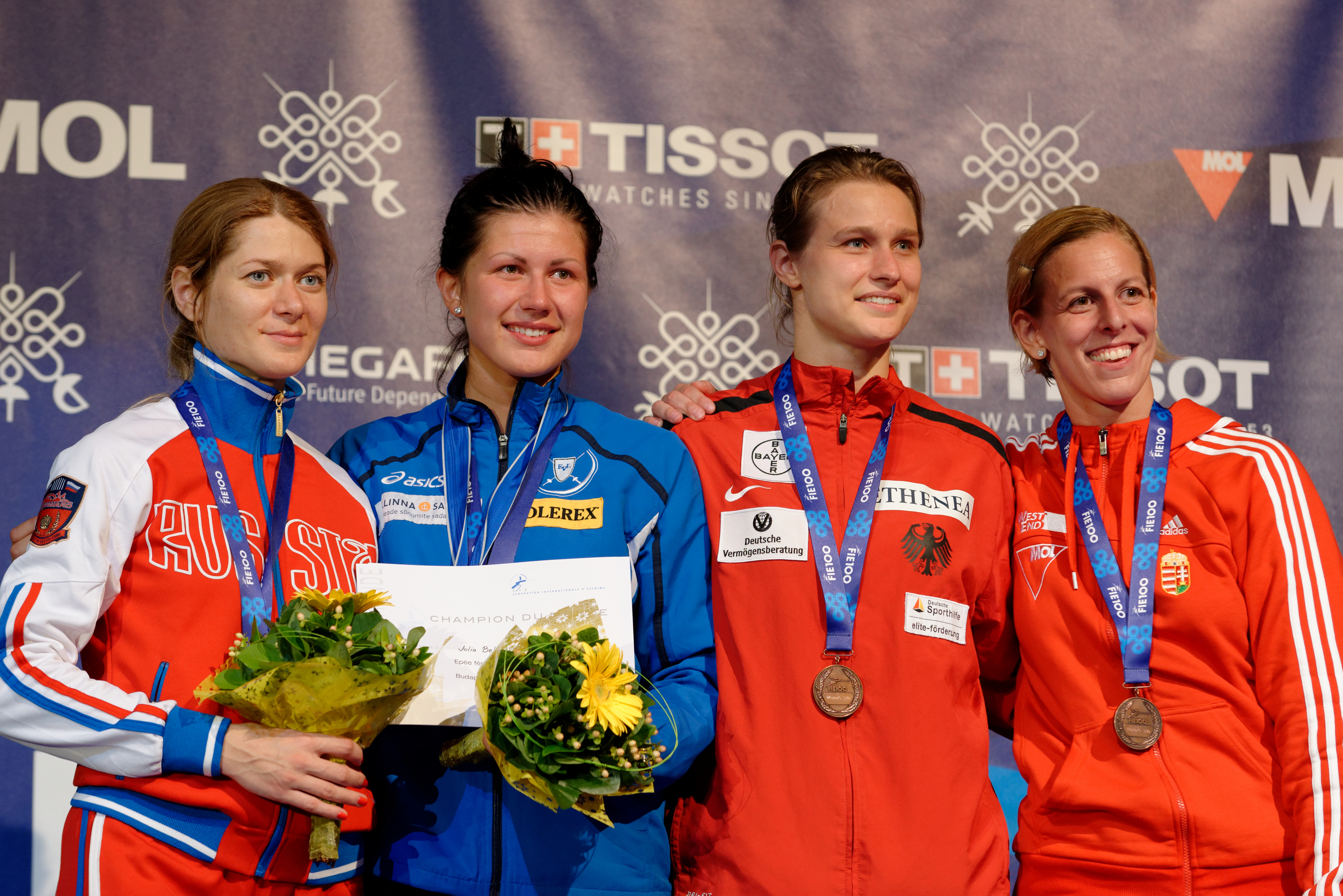
On the podium: from left to right, Anna Sivkova, Julia Beljajeva, Britta Heidemann, and Emese Szász

Gold	Julia Beljajeva (EST)
Silver	Anna Sivkova (RUS)
Bronze	Emese Szász (HUN)
Bronze	Britta Heidemann (GER)

== Draw ==
=== Finals ===
Semi-finals
19:20
(Estonia) Julia Beljajeva	14
(Hungary) Emese Szász	13
19:45
(Germany) Britta Heidemann	9
(Russia) Anna Sivkova	15

Final
20:55
(Estonia) Julia Beljajeva	15
(Russia) Anna Sivkova	14

=== Top half ===
==== Section 1 ====
Round of 64
1	(Romania) Ana Maria Brânză	15
64	(Sweden) Johanna Bergdahl	12
33	(Germany) Beate Christmann	10
32	(South Korea) Choi Eun-Sook	15
17	(France) Lauren Rembi	15
48	(Japan) Ayaka Shimookawa	11
49	(China) Sun Yiwen	15
16	(Italy) Bianca Del Carretto	14
9	(Switzerland) Tiffany Géroudet	13
56	(Ukraine) Olena Kryvytska	12
41	(Estonia) Julia Beljajeva	15
24	(Chinese Taipei) Chang Chia-ling	3
25	(Romania) Maria Udrea	15
40	(Colombia) Laskmi Lozano	7
57	(South Korea) Choi Hyo-joo	10
8	(Italy) Rossella Fiamingo	15

Round of 32
1	(Romania) Ana Maria Brânză	15
32	(South Korea) Choi Eun-Sook	10
17	(France) Lauren Rembi	15
49	(China) Sun Yiwen	13
9	(Switzerland) Tiffany Géroudet	12
41	(Estonia) Julia Beljajeva	14
25	(Romania) Maria Udrea	7
8	(Italy) Rossella Fiamingo	12

Round of 16
1	(Romania) Ana Maria Brânză	15
17	(France) Lauren Rembi	10
41	(Estonia) Julia Beljajeva	15
8	(Italy) Rossella Fiamingo	11

Quarterfinals
1	(Romania) Ana Maria Brânză	14
41	(Estonia) Julia Beljajeva	15

==== Section 2 ====
Round of 64
5	(Tunisia) Sarra Besbes	15
60	(Serbia) Smiljka Rodić	9
37	(Estonia) Erika Kirpu	15
28	(Poland) Malgorzata Stroka	8
21	(China) Hou Yingming	8
44	(Russia) Yana Zvereva	15
53	(Venezuela) Dayana Martínez	8
12	(Germany) Monika Sozanska	15
13	(Estonia) Irina Embrich	15
52	(Ukraine) Kseniya Pantelyeyeva	13
45	(United States) Kelley Hurley	15
20	(Israel) Avital Marinuk	12
29	(Russia) Tatyana Andryushina	15
36	(Ukraine) Dzhoan Bezhura	9
61	(Colombia) Saskia Loretta van Erven Garcia	5
4	(Hungary) Emese Szász	15

Round of 32
5	(Tunisia) Sarra Besbes	9
37	(Estonia) Erika Kirpu	15
44	(Russia) Yana Zvereva	15
12	(Germany) Monika Sozanska	7
13	(Estonia) Irina Embrich	15
45	(United States) Kelley Hurley	12
29	(Russia) Tatyana Andryushina	9
4	(Hungary) Emese Szász	15

Round of 16
37	(Estonia) Erika Kirpu	11
44	(Russia) Yana Zvereva	15
13	(Estonia) Irina Embrich	10
4	(Hungary) Emese Szász	15

Quarterfinals
44	(Russia) Yana Zvereva	7
4	(Hungary) Emese Szász	15

=== Bottom half ===
==== Section 3 ====
Round of 64
3	(South Korea) Shin A-Lam	15
62	(Sweden) Sanne Gars	7
35	(United States) Katharine Holmes	15
30	(United States) Maya Lawrence	9
19	(Romania) Simona Pop	15
46	(Italy) Francesca Quondamcarlo	13
51	(Finland) Catharina Kock	9
14	(United States) Courtney Hurley	15
11	(Russia) Violetta Kolobova	11
54	(Canada) Joanna Guy	15
43	(Sweden) Emma Samuelsson	12
22	(Hungary) Julianna Révész	15
27	(Romania) Raluca Sbîrcia	14
38	(Poland) Renata Knapik	15
59	(Chile) Cáterin Bravo	9
6	(Germany) Britta Heidemann	15

Round of 32
3	(South Korea) Shin A-Lam	11
35	(United States) Katharine Holmes	10
19	(Romania) Simona Pop	10
14	(United States) Courtney Hurley	15
54	(Canada) Joanna Guy	12
22	(Hungary) Julianna Révész	11
38	(Poland) Renata Knapik	13
6	(Germany) Britta Heidemann	15

Round of 16
3	(South Korea) Shin A-Lam	7
14	(United States) Courtney Hurley	6
54	(Canada) Joanna Guy	5
6	(Germany) Britta Heidemann	15

Quarterfinals
3	(South Korea) Shin A-Lam	13
6	(Germany) Britta Heidemann	15

==== Section 4 ====
Round of 64
7	(China) Xu Anqi	15
58	(Kazakhstan) Jamilya Yunusbayeva	12
39	(Italy) Mara Navarria	15
26	(Luxembourg) Lis Fautsch	9
23	(Kazakhstan) Assel Alibekova	6
42	(Sweden) Kinka Barvestad	15
55	(Estonia) Kristina Kuusk	15
10	(South Korea) Choi In-Jeong	14
15	(Germany) Imke Duplitzer	13
50	(Argentina) Isabel di Tella	15
47	(Ukraine) Anfisa Pochkalova	15
18	(Poland) Magdalena Piekarska	14
31	(France) Josephine Jacques Andre Coquin	10
34	(Latvia) Jeļena Rubļevska	9
63	(China) Luo Xiaojuan	6
2	(Russia) Anna Sivkova	15

Round of 32
7	(China) Xu Anqi	7
39	(Italy) Mara Navarria	15
42	(Sweden) Kinka Barvestad	7
55	(Estonia) Kristina Kuusk	15
50	(Argentina) Isabel di Tella	7
47	(Ukraine) Anfisa Pochkalova	5
31	(France) Josephine Jacques Andre Coquin	7
2	(Russia) Anna Sivkova	15

Round of 16
39	(Italy) Mara Navarria	15
55	(Estonia) Kristina Kuusk	12
50	(Argentina) Isabel di Tella	7
2	(Russia) Anna Sivkova	15

Quarterfinals
39	(Italy) Mara Navarria	12
2	(Russia) Anna Sivkova	15

== Final classification ==
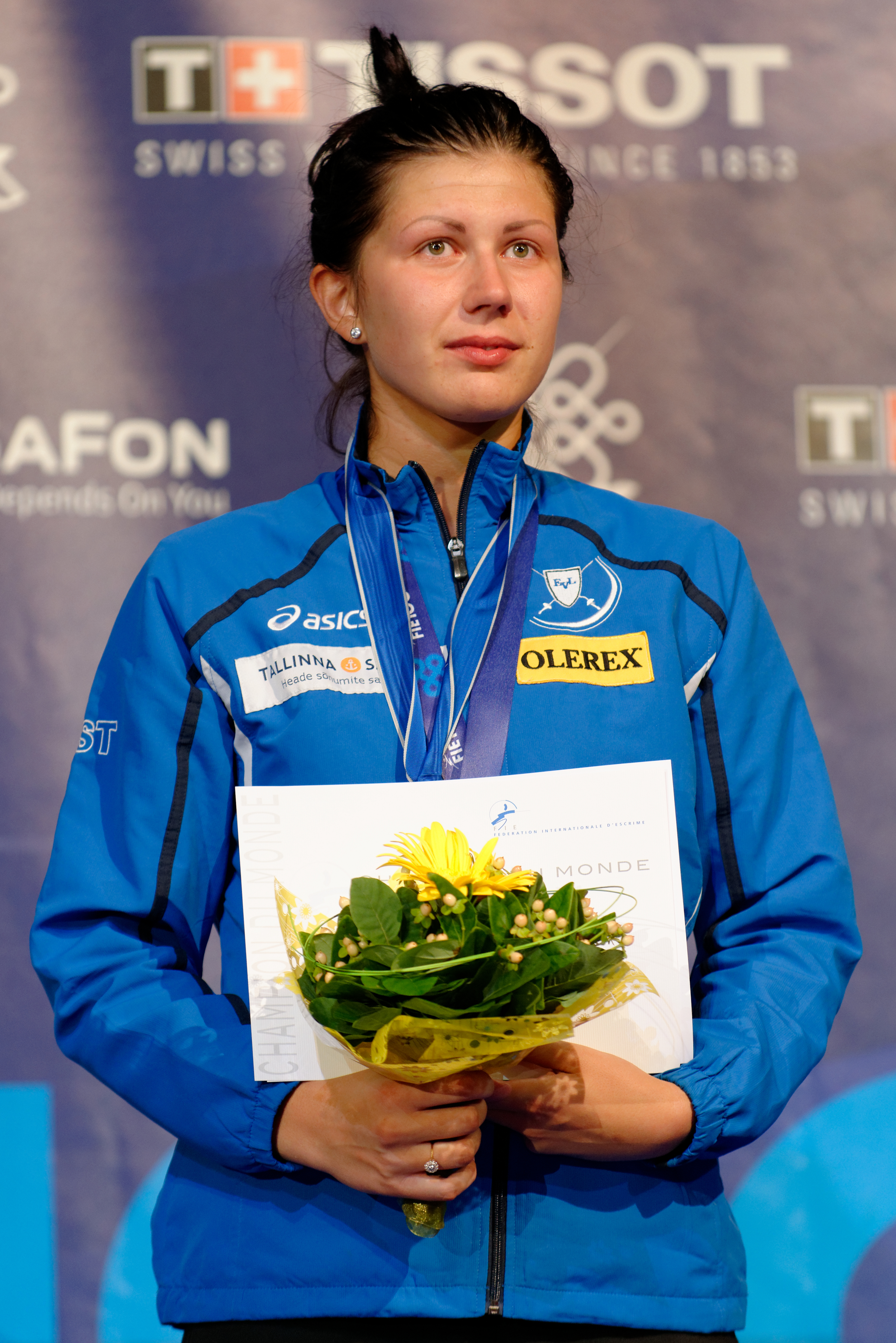
2013 World Champion Julia Beljajeva

Rank	Athlete	Nation
1st place, gold medalist(s)	Julia Beljajeva	Estonia
2nd place, silver medalist(s)	Anna Sivkova	Russia
3rd place, bronze medalist(s)	Britta Heidemann	Germany
3rd place, bronze medalist(s)	Emese Szász	Hungary
5	Ana Maria Brânză	Romania
6	Shin A-lam	South Korea
7	Mara Navarria	Italy
8	Yana Zvereva	Russia
9	Rossella Fiamingo	Italy
10	Irina Embrich	Estonia
11	Courtney Hurley	United States
12	Lauren Rembi	France
13	Erika Kirpu	Estonia
14	Isabel di Tella	Argentina
15	Joanna Guy	Canada
16	Kristina Kuusk	Estonia
17	Sarra Besbes	Tunisia
18	Xu Anqi	China
19	Tiffany Géroudet	Switzerland
20	Monika Sozanska	Germany
21	Simona Pop	Romania
22	Julianna Révész	Hungary
23	Maria Udrea	Romania
24	Tatyana Andryushina	Russia
25	Joséphine Jacques André Coquin	France
26	Choi Eon-sook	South Korea
27	Katharine Holmes	United States
28	Renata Knapik	Poland
29	Kinka Barvestad	Sweden
30	Kelley Hurley	United States
31	Anfisa Pochkalova	Ukraine
32	Sun Yiwen	China
33	Choi In-jeong	South Korea
34	Violetta Kolobova	Russia
35	Imke Duplitzer	Germany
36	Bianca Del Carretto	Italy
37	Magdalena Piekarska	Poland
38	Avital Marinuk	Israel
39	Hou Yingming	China
40	Assel Alibekova	Kazakhstan
41	Chang Chia-ling	Chinese Taipei
42	Lis Fautsch	Luxembourg
43	Raluca Sbîrcia	Romania
43	Małgorzata Stroka	Poland
45	Maya Lawrence	United States
46	Beate Christmann	Germany
47	Jeļena Rubļevska	Latvia
48	Dzhoan Bezhura	Ukraine
49	Laskmi Lozano	Colombia
50	Emma Samuelsson	Sweden
51	Francesca Quondamcarlo	Italy
52	Ayaka Shimookawa	Japan
53	Kseniya Pantelyeyeva	Ukraine
54	Catharina Kock	Finland
55	Dayana Martínez	Venezuela
56	Olena Kryvytska	Ukraine
57	Choi Hyo-joo	South Korea
58	Yamilya Yunusbayeva	Kazakhstan
59	Cáterin Bravo	Chile
60	Smiljka Rodić	Serbia
61	Saskia Loretta van Erven Garcia	Colombia
62	Sanne Gars	Sweden
63	Luo Xiaojuan	China
64	Johanna Bergdahl	Sweden
65	Joanna Halls	Australia
65	Angela Krieger	Switzerland
67	Michaela Kock	Finland
68	Corinna Lawrence	Great Britain
69	Jeanne Christou	Greece
70	Alona Komarov	Israel
71	Cleia Guilhon	Brazil
72	María Martínez	Venezuela
73	Dorina Budai	Hungary
74	Marie-Florence Candassamy	France
75	Niki-Katerina Sidiropoulou-Christodoulou	Greece
76	Laura Stähli	Switzerland
77	Gulymira Ziyaeva	Uzbekistan
78	Alejandra Terán	Mexico
79	Yanina Zakharova	Kazakhstan
80	Dominika Doubová	Czech Republic
81	Romana Caran	Serbia
82	Dominique Tannous	Lebanon
83	Alexis D. Anna Rudkovska	Canada
84	Małgorzata Bereza	Poland
85	Dagmar Barániková	Slovakia
85	Gökçe Günaç	Turkey
85	Yeung Chui Ling	Hong Kong
88	Eva Jeza	Slovenia
89	Ulyana Balaganskaya	Kazakhstan
90	Rayssa Costa	Brazil
91	Jesica Jímenez Luna	Panama
92	Martina Olexová	Czech Republic
93	Tarmyn Carfoot	South Africa
94	Edina Antal	Hungary
95	Ayah Mandy	Egypt
96	Terhi Lumme	Finland
97	Maya Mansouri	Tunisia
98	Dirley Janineth Yepes Molina	Costa Rica
99	Rie Ohashi	Japan
100	Chu Ka Mong	Hong Kong
100	Miho Morioka	Japan
102	Sarah MacFarlane	Australia
103	Hsu Jo-Ting	Chinese Taipei
104	Ana London	Israel
105	Lim Victoria Ann Xiu Yan	Singapore
106	Nickol Tal	Israel
107	Albina Abdurahmonova	Uzbekistan
108	Auriane Mallo	France
109	Daniela Doubová	Czech Republic
110	Bianca Dantas	Brazil
111	Pauline Brunner	Switzerland
112	Juliana Barrett	South Africa
113	Julie Bendixen	Denmark
114	Daniella Klonarides	South Africa
115	Diana Sher	Australia
116	Alexandra Avena	Mexico
117	Pia Klafstad	Norway
118	Reha Doğan	Turkey
119	Elíana Lugo	Venezuela
119	Aleksandra Jevremović	Serbia
121	Andrea Christina Chiuchich	Argentina
122	Tseng Tsin Hui	Chinese Taipei
123	Cheng Yuk Han Bjork	Hong Kong
124	Evelyn Halls	Australia
125	Inês Herminio	Portugal
126	Amanda Simeão	Brazil
126	Eleni Pashalidou	Greece
128	Anna Salminen	Finland
129	Lizzie Assi	Venezuela
129	Melbye Ann Karin	Singapore
129	Vanessa Lacas-Warrick	Canada
132	Cheung Suet Yi	Hong Kong
133	Nusa Trpin	Slovenia
134	Desislava Simeonova	Bulgaria
134	Malika Khakimova	Uzbekistan
136	Danijela Ilić	Serbia
137	Brittany Mark-Larkin	Canada
137	Ana Irene Delgado Guerra	Panama
139	Saki Nakano	Japan
140	Tsolmon Batkhuu	Mongolia
141	Michala Pechovová	Czech Republic
142	Orkhon Erdenebaatar	Mongolia
143	Roberta Ilijasev	Croatia
144	Gerelmaa Baatarchuluun	Mongolia
145	Talia Espinosa	Mexico
146	Jannie Høtoft	Denmark
147	Lim Cheryl	Singapore
148	Gulynaz Abdurahmanova	Uzbekistan
149	Simona Tobias	Slovenia
150	Jenneth Achilova	Turkmenistan
150	Maria Norgil Donslund	Denmark
152	Gaja Kores	Slovenia
153	Oxana Bakaeva	Tajikistan
