= 2014 European Fencing Championships =

International sports competition

The 2014 European Fencing Championships were held in Strasbourg, France from 7–14 June 2014 at the Rhénus Sport.

== Schedule ==
●	Opening Ceremony	●	Finals	●	Closing Ceremony

June	7	8	9	10	11	12	13	14	Total
Ceremonies	●							●	
Foil Individual			Men	Women					2
Sabre Individual			Women	Men					2
Épée Individual	Men	Women							2
Foil Team							Men	Women	2
Sabre Team							Women	Men	2
Épée team					Men	Women			2
Total Gold Medals	1	1	2	2	1	1	2	2	12

== Medal summary ==
=== Men's events ===
Event	Gold	Silver	Bronze
Foil	James-Andrew Davis (GBR)	Aleksey Cheremisinov (RUS)	Peter Joppich (GER); Erwann Le Péchoux (FRA)
Épée	András Rédli (HUN)	Paolo Pizzo (ITA)	Max Heinzer (SUI); Jean-Michel Lucenay (FRA)
Sabre	Aleksey Yakimenko (RUS)	Veniamin Reshetnikov (RUS)	Kamil Ibragimov (RUS); Csanád Gémesi (HUN)
Team Foil	France; Enzo Lefort; Vincent Simon; Erwann Le Péchoux; Julien Mertine	Italy; Andrea Cassarà; Valerio Aspromonte; Andrea Baldini; Giorgio Avola	Russia; Aleksey Cheremisinov; Dmitry Rigin; Renal Ganeyev; Timur Safin
Team Épée	Switzerland; Fabian Kauter; Max Heinzer; Benjamin Steffen; Peer Borsky	Spain; Yulen Pereira; José Luis Abajo; Miguel Moratilla; Pau Roselló	Russia; Pavel Sukhov; Anton Avdeev; Sergey Bida; Sergey Khodos
Team Sabre	Italy; Enrico Berrè; Luigi Samele; Diego Occhiuzzi; Luigi Miracco	Russia; Veniamin Reshetnikov; Aleksey Yakimenko; Kamil Ibragimov; Ilya Motorin	Germany; Max Hartung; Benedikt Wagner; Matyas Szabo; Richard Hübers

=== Women's events ===
Event	Gold	Silver	Bronze
Foil	Elisa Di Francisca (ITA)	Martina Batini (ITA)	Yulia Biryukova (RUS); Valentina Vezzali (ITA)
Épée	Bianca Del Carretto (ITA)	Marie-Florence Candassamy (FRA)	Joséphine Coquin (FRA); Simona Gherman (ROU)
Sabre	Olha Kharlan (UKR)	Yekaterina Dyachenko (RUS)	Rossella Gregorio (ITA); Vassiliki Vougiouka (GRE)
Team Foil	Italy; Arianna Errigo; Elisa Di Francisca; Valentina Vezzali; Martina Batini	Russia; Inna Deriglazova; Diana Yakovleva; Larisa Korobeynikova; Yulia Biryukova	France; Ysaora Thibus; Astrid Guyart; Corinne Maîtrejean; Gaëlle Gebet
Team Épée	Romania; Ana Maria Brânză; Simona Pop; Simona Gherman; Maria Udrea	Russia; Yana Zvereva; Violetta Kolobova; Lyubov Shutova; Tatyana Gudkova	Italy; Rossella Fiamingo; Mara Navarria; Francesca Quondamcarlo; Bianca Del Carretto
Team Sabre	Russia; Yekaterina Dyachenko; Dina Galiakbarova; Yana Egorian; Sofiya Velikaya	France; Charlotte Lembach; Cécilia Berder; Saoussen Boudiaf; Manon Brunet	Ukraine; Olha Kharlan; Halyna Pundyk; Olena Voronina; Olha Zhovnir

=== Medal table ===
Rank	Nation	Gold	Silver	Bronze	Total
1	Italy	4	3	3	10
2	Russia	2	6	4	12
3	France	1	2	4	7
4	Hungary	1	0	1	2
4	Romania	1	0	1	2
4	Switzerland	1	0	1	2
4	Ukraine	1	0	1	2
8	Great Britain	1	0	0	1
9	Spain	0	1	0	1
10	Germany	0	0	2	2
11	Greece	0	0	1	1
Totals (11 entries)		12	12	18	42

== Results ==
=== Men ===
==== Épée individual ====
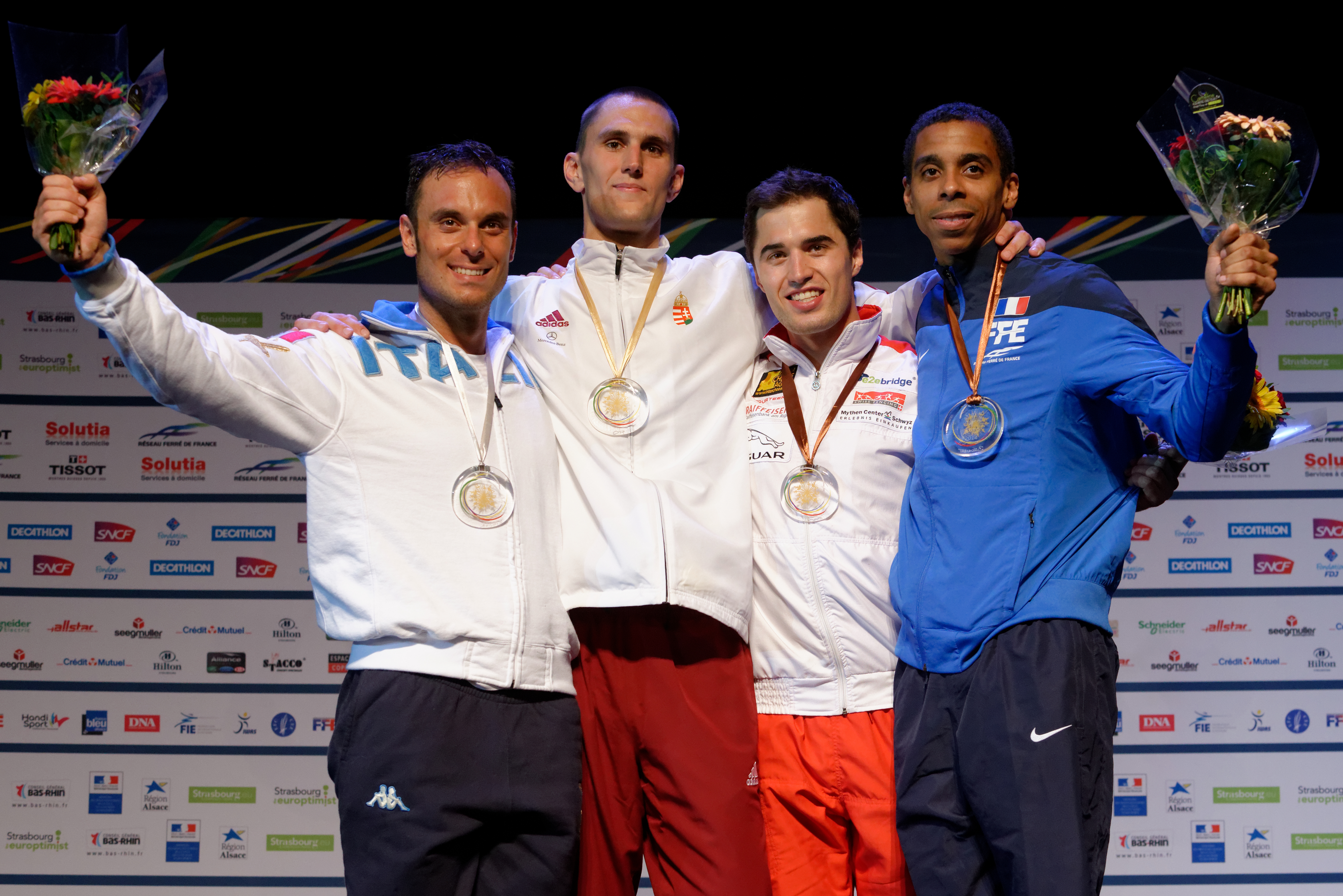
Podium of the men's épée: Pizzo, Rédli, Heinzer, and Lucenay

Position	Name	Country
1st place, gold medalist(s)	András Rédli	Hungary
2nd place, silver medalist(s)	Paolo Pizzo	Italy
3rd place, bronze medalist(s)	Max Heinzer	Switzerland
3rd place, bronze medalist(s)	Jean-Michel Lucenay	France
5.	Anton Avdeev	Russia
6.	Ulrich Robeiri	France
7.	Sergey Khodos	Russia
8.	Ihor Reizlin	Ukraine

Quarter-finals
(France) Jean-Michel Lucenay	15
(Ukraine) Ihor Reizlin	7
(Russia) Anton Avdeev	14
(Italy) Paolo Pizzo	15
(Hungary) András Rédli	9
(France) Ulrich Robeiri	8
(Switzerland) Max Heinzer	15
(Russia) Sergey Khodos	7

Semi-finals
(France) Jean-Michel Lucenay	11
(Italy) Paolo Pizzo	15
(Hungary) András Rédli	15
(Switzerland) Max Heinzer	14

Final
(Italy) Paolo Pizzo	8
(Hungary) András Rédli	15

==== Foil individual ====
Position	Name	Country
1st place, gold medalist(s)	James-Andrew Davis	Great Britain
2nd place, silver medalist(s)	Aleksey Cheremisinov	Russia
3rd place, bronze medalist(s)	Peter Joppich	Germany
3rd place, bronze medalist(s)	Erwann Le Péchoux	France
5.	Alexander Choupenitch	Czech Republic
5.	Tomer Or	Israel
7.	Giorgio Avola	Italy
8.	Klod Yunes	Ukraine

Quarter-finals
(Ukraine) Klod Yunes	4
(France) Erwann Le Péchoux	15
(Italy) Giorgio Avola	12
(Russia) Aleksey Cheremisinov	14
(Israel) Tomer Or	3
(Germany) Peter Joppich	15
(United Kingdom) James-Andrew Davis	15
(Czech Republic) Alexander Choupenitch	13

Semi-finals
(France) Erwann Le Péchoux	9
(Russia) Aleksey Cheremisinov	15
(Germany) Peter Joppich	8
(United Kingdom) James-Andrew Davis	15

Final
(Russia) Aleksey Cheremisinov	11
(United Kingdom) James-Andrew Davis	15

==== Sabre individual ====
Position	Name	Country
1st place, gold medalist(s)	Aleksey Yakimenko	Russia
2nd place, silver medalist(s)	Veniamin Reshetnikov	Russia
3rd place, bronze medalist(s)	Csanád Gémesi	Hungary
3rd place, bronze medalist(s)	Kamil Ibragimov	Russia
5.	Diego Occhiuzzi	Italy
6.	Nicolas Rousset	France
7.	Enrico Berrè	Italy
8.	Richard Hübers	Germany

Quarter-finals
(Italy) Enrico Berrè	13
(Russia) Aleksey Yakimenko	15
(Italy) Diego Occhiuzzi	10
(Russia) Kamil Ibragimov	15
(Germany) Richard Hübers	9
(Russia) Veniamin Reshetnikov	15
(Hungary) Csanád Gémesi	15
(France) Nicolas Rousset	13

Semi-finals
(Russia) Aleksey Yakimenko	15
(Russia) Kamil Ibragimov	11
(Russia) Veniamin Reshetnikov	15
(Hungary) Csanád Gémesi	12

Final
(Russia) Aleksey Yakimenko	15
(Russia) Veniamin Reshetnikov	11

==== Épée team ====
Position	Name	Country
1st place, gold medalist(s)	Fabian Kauter; Max Heinzer; Benjamin Steffen; Peer Borsky	Switzerland
2nd place, silver medalist(s)	Yulen Pereira; José Luis Abajo; Miguel Moratilla; Pau Roselló	Spain
3rd place, bronze medalist(s)	Pavel Sukhov; Anton Avdeev; Sergey Bida; Sergey Khodos	Russia
4.	Bohdan Nikishyn; Maksym Khvorost; Ihor Reizlin; Anatoliy Herey	Ukraine
5.	Nikolai Novosjolov; Sten Priinits; Jüri Salm; Sven Järve	Estonia
6.	Ulrich Robeiri; Daniel Jerent; Gauthier Grumier; Jean-Michel Lucenay	France
7.	András Rédli; Gábor Boczkó; Géza Imre; Péter Somfai	Hungary
8.	Ido Herpe; Grigori Beskin; Yuval Freilich; Ido Ajzenstadt	Israel

Quarter-finals
Hungary	32
Russia	45
Spain	44
France	43
Ukraine	19
Estonia	13
Israel	32
Switzerland	39

Semi-finals
Russia	37
Spain	43
Ukraine	34
Switzerland	35

Final
Spain	34
Switzerland	45
Third place
Russia	45
Ukraine	44

==== Foil team ====
Position	Name	Country
1st place, gold medalist(s)	Enzo Lefort; Vincent Simon; Erwan Le Péchoux; Julien Mertine	France
2nd place, silver medalist(s)	Andrea Cassarà; Valerio Aspromonte; Andrea Baldini; Giorgio Avola	Italy
3rd place, bronze medalist(s)	Aleksey Cheremisinov; Dmitry Rigin; Renal Ganeyev; Timur Safin	Russia
4.	Michał Majewski; Leszek Rajski; Paweł Kawiecki; Radosław Glonek	Poland
5.	Peter Joppich; Sebastian Bachmann; Marius Braun; Moritz Kröplin	Germany
6.	James-Andrew Davis; Richard Kruse; Alex Tofalides; Marcus Mepstead	Great Britain
7.	Kristóf Szabados; Gábor Szabados; Daniel Dosa; András Németh	Hungary
8.	Alexander Choupenitch; Václav Kundera; Jiří Kurfürst; Jan Krejčík	Czech Republic

Quarter-finals
Italy	45
Hungary	21
Poland	45
Germany	35
Russia	45
Great Britain	42
Czech Republic	27
France	45

Semi-finals
Italy	45
Poland	39
Russia	35
France	45

Final
Italy	41
France	45
Third place
Poland	28
Russia	45

==== Sabre team ====
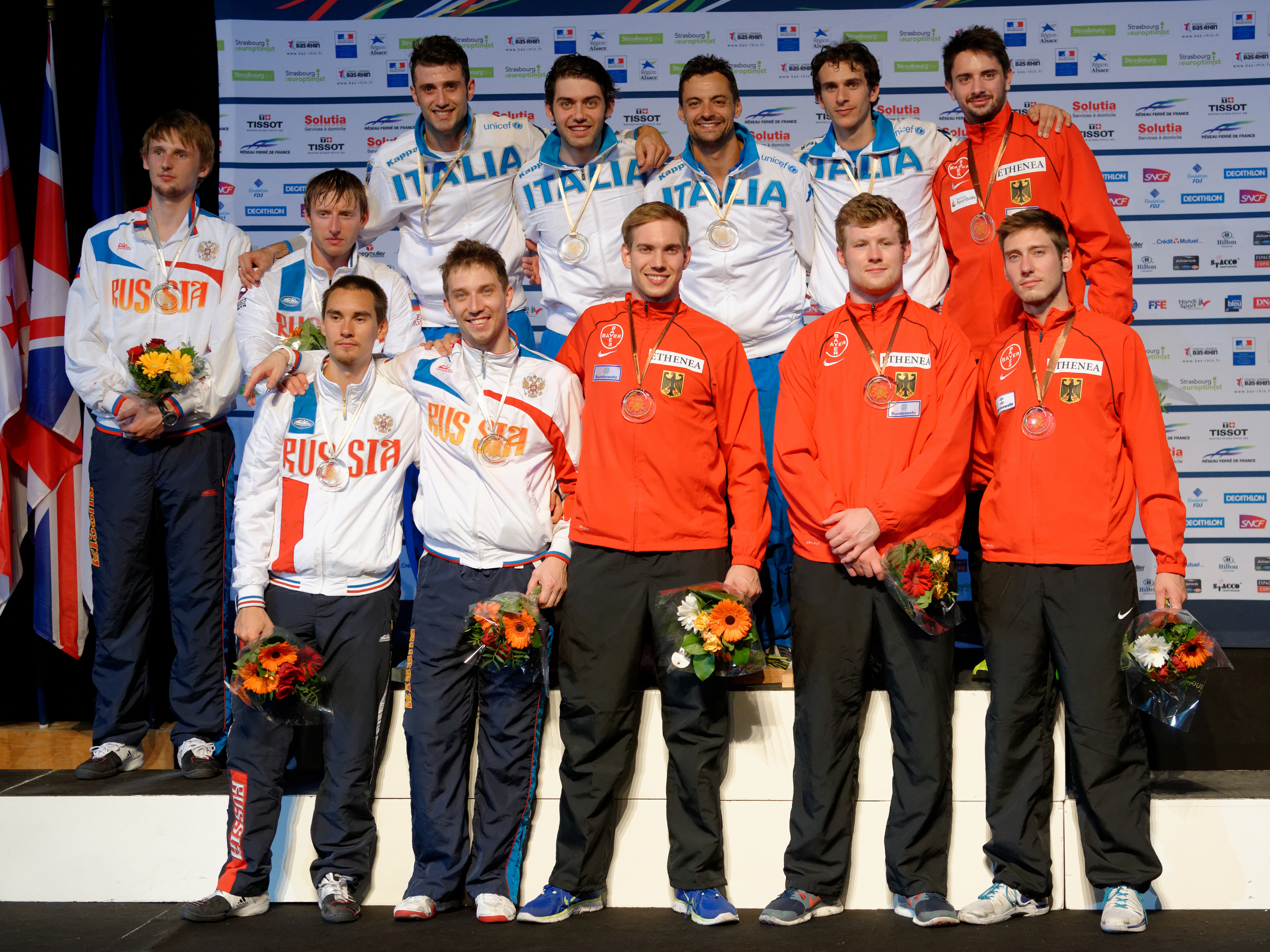
Podium of the men's team sabre: Italy, Russia, and Germany

Position	Name	Country
1st place, gold medalist(s)	Enrico Berrè; Luigi Samele; Diego Occhiuzzi; Luigi Miracco	Italy
2nd place, silver medalist(s)	Veniamin Reshetnikov; Aleksey Yakimenko; Kamil Ibragimov; Ilya Motorin	Russia
3rd place, bronze medalist(s)	Max Hartung; Benedikt Wagner; Matyas Szabo; Richard Hübers	Germany
4.	Aliaksandr Buikevich; Aliaksei Likhacheuski; Valery Pryiemka; Siarhei Shachanin	Belarus
5.	Tiberiu Dolniceanu; Alin Badea; Ciprian Gălățanu; Iulian Teodosiu	Romania
6.	Áron Szilágyi; Csanád Gémesi; András Szatmári; Tamás Decsi	Hungary
7.	Vincent Anstett; Nicolas Rousset; Boladé Apithy; Maxence Lambert	France
8.	Dmytro Boyko; Andriy Yahodka; Dmytro Pundyk; Yevhen Statsenko	Ukraine

Quarter-finals
Russia	45
Ukraine	34
Belarus	45
Romania	41
Germany	45
Hungary	43
France	43
Italy	45

Semi-finals
Russia	45
Belarus	40
Germany	44
Italy	45

Final
Russia	44
Italy	45
Third place
Belarus	35
Germany	45

=== Women ===
==== Épée individual ====
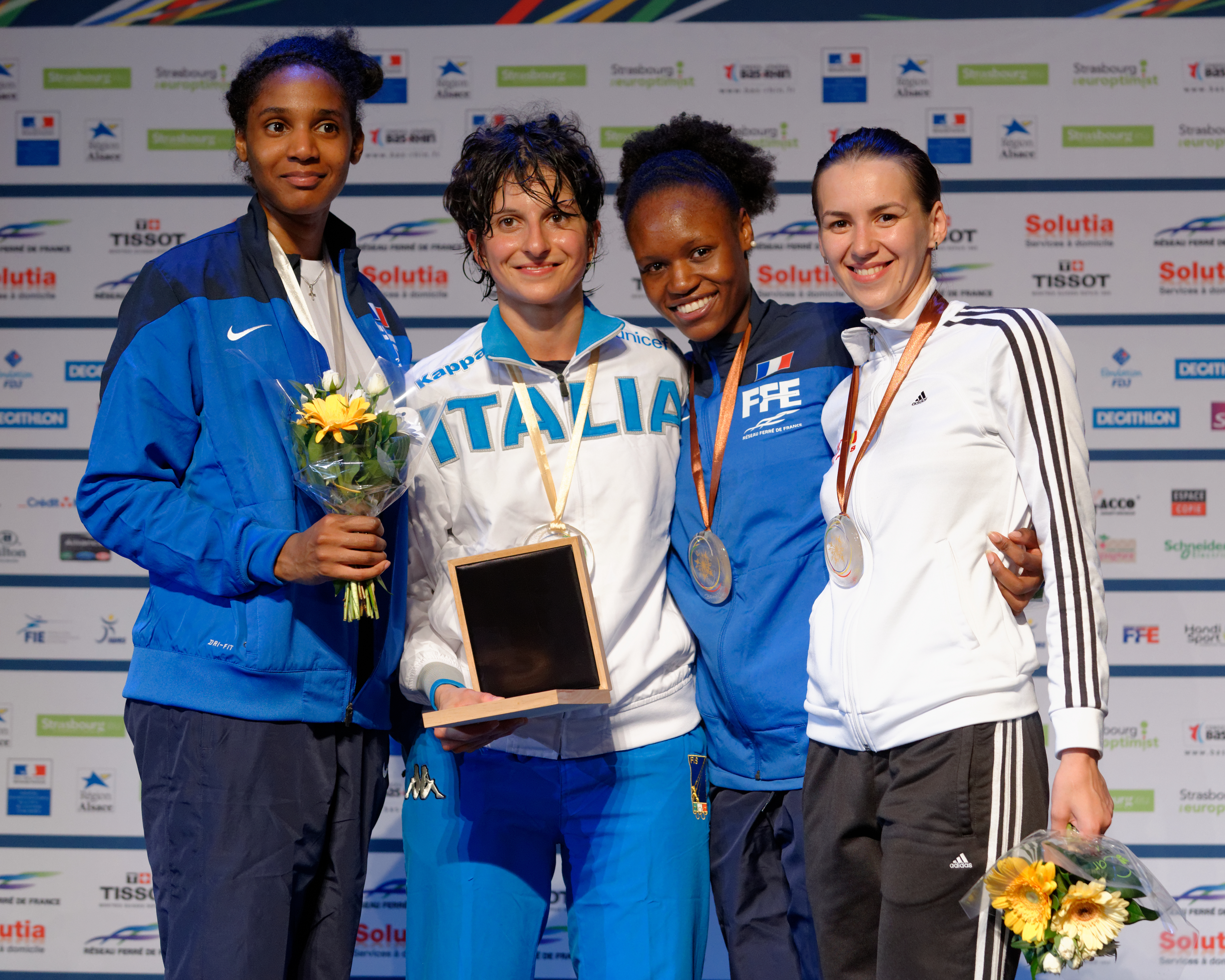
Podium of the women's épée: Candassamy, Del Carretto, Jacques-André-Coquin, and Gherman

Position	Name	Country
1st place, gold medalist(s)	Bianca Del Carretto	Italy
2nd place, silver medalist(s)	Marie-Florence Candassamy	France
3rd place, bronze medalist(s)	Joséphine Coquin	France
3rd place, bronze medalist(s)	Simona Gherman	Romania
5.	Emese Szász	Hungary
6.	Lyubov Shutova	Russia
7.	Yana Zvereva	Russia
8.	Yana Shemyakina	Ukraine

Quarter-finals
(France) Joséphine Coquin	15
(Russia) Yana Zvereva	11
(Hungary) Emese Szász	9
(Italy) Bianca Del Carretto	15
(Romania) Simona Gherman	15
(Ukraine) Yana Shemyakina	14
(Russia) Lyubov Shutova	11
(France) Marie-Florence Candassamy	15

Semi-finals
(France) Joséphine Coquin	13
(Italy) Bianca Del Carretto	15
(Romania) Simona Gherman	9
(France) Marie-Florence Candassamy	15

Final
(Italy) Bianca Del Carretto	15
(France) Marie-Florence Candassamy	12

==== Foil individual ====
Position	Name	Country
1st place, gold medalist(s)	Elisa Di Francisca	Italy
2nd place, silver medalist(s)	Martina Batini	Italy
3rd place, bronze medalist(s)	Yulia Biryukova	Russia
3rd place, bronze medalist(s)	Valentina Vezzali	Italy
5.	Carolin Golubytskyi	Germany
6.	Arianna Errigo	Italy
7.	Anne Sauer	Germany
8.	Larisa Korobeynikova	Russia

Quarter-finals
(Germany) Carolin Golubytskyi	7
(Italy) Valentina Vezzali	8
(Germany) Anne Sauer	10
(Italy) Elisa Di Francisca	15
(Italy) Arianna Errigo	13
(Russia) Yulia Biryukova	15
(Italy) Martina Batini	15
(Russia) Larisa Korobeynikova	10

Semi-finals
(Italy) Valentina Vezzali	3
(Italy) Elisa Di Francisca	15
(Russia) Yulia Biryukova	12
(Italy) Martina Batini	15

Final
(Italy) Elisa Di Francisca	15
(Italy) Martina Batini	5

==== Sabre individual ====
Position	Name	Country
1st place, gold medalist(s)	Olha Kharlan	Ukraine
2nd place, silver medalist(s)	Yekaterina Dyachenko	Russia
3rd place, bronze medalist(s)	Vassiliki Vougiouka	Greece
3rd place, bronze medalist(s)	Rossella Gregorio	Italy
5.	Manon Brunet	France
6.	Yana Egorian	Russia
7.	Anna Limbach	Germany
8.	Aleksandra Socha	Poland

Quarter-finals
(Greece) Vassiliki Vougiouka	15
(Poland) Aleksandra Socha	8
(Russia) Yekaterina Dyachenko	15
(France) Manon Brunet	7
(Russia) Yana Egorian	8
(Ukraine) Olha Kharlan	15
(Italy) Rossella Gregorio	15
(Germany) Anna Limbach	9

Semi-finals
(Greece) Vassiliki Vougiouka	10
(Russia) Yekaterina Dyachenko	15
(Ukraine) Olha Kharlan	15
(Italy) Rossella Gregorio	8

Final
(Russia) Yekaterina Dyachenko	12
(Ukraine) Olha Kharlan	15

==== Épée team ====
Position	Name	Country
1st place, gold medalist(s)	Ana Maria Brânză; Simona Pop; Simona Gherman; Maria Udrea	Romania
2nd place, silver medalist(s)	Yana Zvereva; Violetta Kolobova; Lyubov Shutova; Tatyana Gudkova	Russia
3rd place, bronze medalist(s)	Rossella Fiamingo; Mara Navarria; Francesca Quondamcarlo; Bianca Del Carretto	Italy
4.	Julia Beljajeva; Irina Embrich; Erika Kirpu; Kristina Kuusk	Estonia
5.	Emese Szász; Julianna Révész; Edina Antal; Hajnalka Tóth	Hungary
6.	Malgorzata Stroka; Ewa Nelip; Magdalena Piekarska; Dominika Mosler	Poland
7.	Tiffany Géroudet; Pauline Brunner; Laura Stähli; Angela Krieger	Switzerland
8.	Yana Shemyakina; Olena Kryvytska; Anastasia Ivchenko; Dzhoan Bezhura	Ukraine

Quarter-finals
Russia	34
Poland	33
Switzerland	23
Estonia	45
Hungary	26
Italy	34
Ukraine	31
Romania	45

Semi-finals
Russia	43
Estonia	31
Italy	24
Romania	29

Final
Russia	34
Romania	38
Third place
Estonia	42
Italy	45

==== Foil team ====
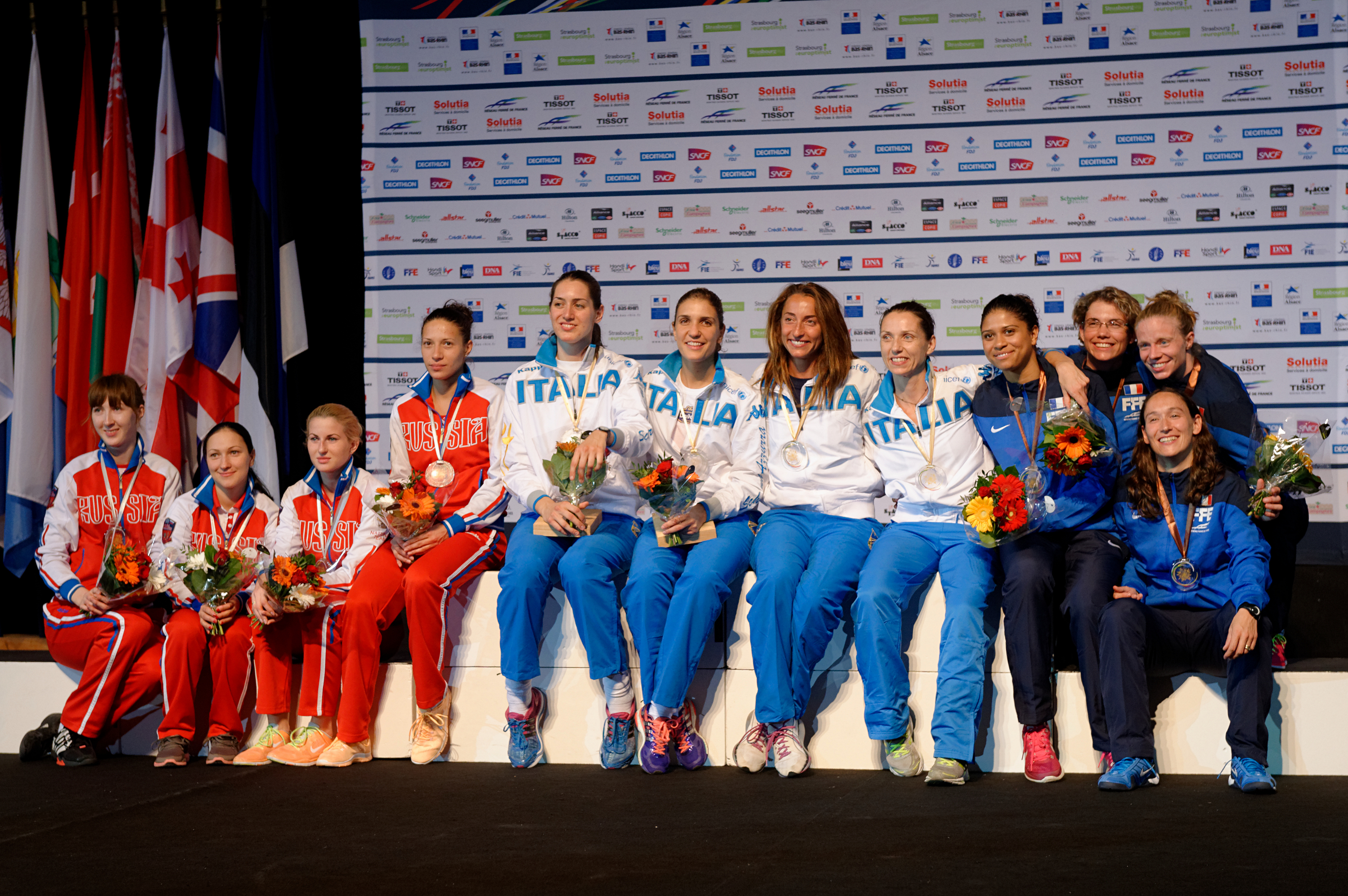
Podium of the women's team foil: Italy, Russia, and France

Position	Name	Country
1st place, gold medalist(s)	Arianna Errigo; Elisa Di Francisca; Valentina Vezzali; Martina Batini	Italy
2nd place, silver medalist(s)	Inna Deriglazova; Diana Yakovleva; Larisa Korobeynikova; Yulia Biryukova	Russia
3rd place, bronze medalist(s)	Ysaora Thibus; Astrid Guyart; Corinne Maîtrejean; Gaëlle Gebet	France
4.	Martyna Synoradzka; Karolina Chlewińska; Hanna Lyczbinska; Marta Lyczbinska	Poland
5.	Edina Knapek; Gabriella Varga; Szilvia Jeszenszky; Fanny Kreiss	Hungary
6.	Carolin Golubytskyi; Katja Wächter; Sandra Bingenheimer; Anne Sauer	Germany
7.	Olha Leleiko; Alexandra Sinyta; Kateryna Chentsova; Kateryna Deordieva	Ukraine
8.	Maria Boldor; Mălina Călugăreanu; Isabelle Stan; Ana Boldor	Romania

Quarter-finals
Italy	45
Romania	16
Hungary	30
Poland	45
France	45
Germany	43
Ukraine	35
Russia	41

Semi-finals
Italy	45
Poland	23
France	26
Russia	45

Final
Italy	45
Russia	44
Third place
Poland	38
France	45

==== Sabre team ====
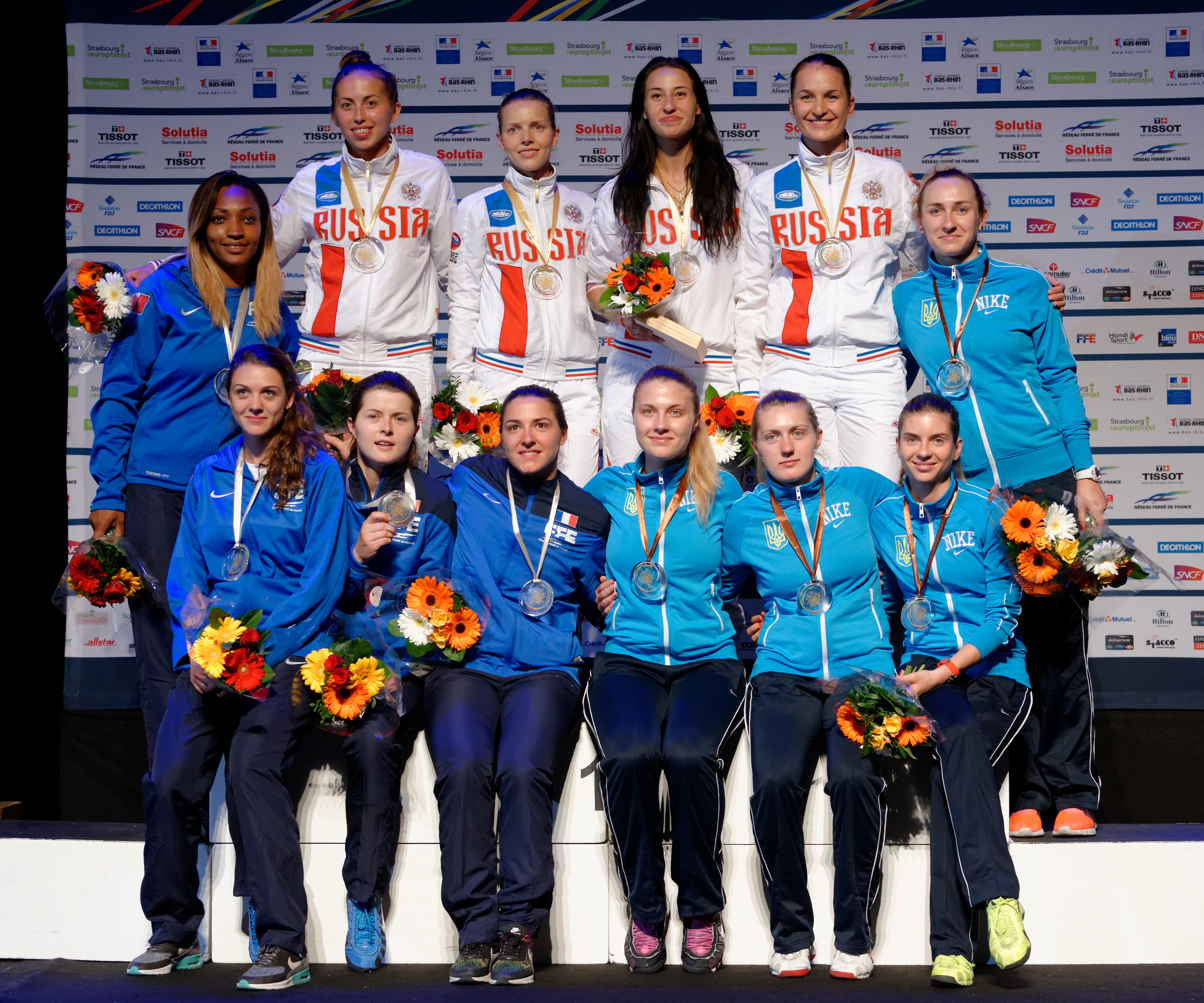
Podium of the women's team sabre: Russia, France, and Ukraine

Position	Name	Country
1st place, gold medalist(s)	Yekaterina Dyachenko; Dina Galiakbarova; Yana Egorian; Sofiya Velikaya	Russia
2nd place, silver medalist(s)	Charlotte Lembach; Cécilia Berder; Saoussen Boudiaf; Manon Brunet	France
3rd place, bronze medalist(s)	Olha Kharlan; Halyna Pundyk; Olena Voronina; Olha Zhovnir	Ukraine
4.	Anna Márton; Anna Várhelyi; Kata Várhelyi; Nora Garam	Hungary
5.	Aleksandra Socha; Malgorzata Kozaczuk; Matylda Ostojska; Bogna Jóźwiak	Poland
6.	Irene Vecchi; Rossella Gregorio; Ilaria Bianco; Lucrezia Sinigaglia	Italy
7.	Araceli Navarro; Sandra Marcos; Laia Vila; Lucia Martin-Portugues	Spain
8.	Alexandra Bujdoso; Anna Limbach; Sibylle Klemm; Judith Kusian	Germany

Quarter-finals
Russia	45
Germany	32
Hungary	45
Poland	43
Italy	40
France	45
Spain	43
Ukraine	45

Semi-finals
Russia	45
Hungary	41
France	45
Ukraine	30

Final
Russia	45
France	43
Third place
Hungary	39
Ukraine	45
