= Fencing at 2013 World Combat Games – Women's Epee Individual =

The Women's Épée event of the 2013 World Combat Games was held in Saint Petersburg, Russia on 26 October.

== Medalists ==
Gold	Silver	Bronze
Emese Szász (HUN)	Julia Beljajeva (EST)	Xu Anqi (CHN)

== Athlete list ==
- (Canada) Joanna Guy
- (China) Xu Anqi
- (Egypt) Ayah Mahdy
- (Estonia) Julia Beljajeva
- (Estonia) Irina Embrich
- (Hungary) Emese Szász
- (Italy) Rossella Fiamingo
- (South Korea) Choi In-Jeong
- (South Korea) Shin A-Lam
- (Romania) Ana Maria Brânză
- (Russia) Violetta Kolobova
- (Russia) Anna Sivkova
- (Switzerland) Tiffany Géroudet
- (Tunisia) Sarra Besbes

== Results ==
Round of 16
(Estonia) Julia Beljajeva	15
(Tunisia) Sarra Besbes	6
(South Korea) Choi In-jeong	11
(South Korea) Shin A-lam	15
(China) Xu Anqi	15
(Canada) Joanna Guy	6
(Egypt) Ayah Mahdy	6
(Hungary) Emese Szász	15
(Italy) Rossella Fiamingo	12
(Russia) Violetta Kolobova	15
(Switzerland) Tiffany Géroudet	8
(Estonia) Irina Embrich	15

Quarterfinals
(Russia) Anna Sivkova	9
(Estonia) Julia Beljajeva	15
(South Korea) Shin A-lam	13
(China) Xu Anqi	15
(Hungary) Emese Szász	15
(Russia) Violetta Kolobova	5
(Estonia) Irina Embrich	11
(Romania) Ana Maria Brânză	15

Semifinals
(Estonia) Julia Beljajeva	15
(China) Xu Anqi	14
(Hungary) Emese Szász	15
(Romania) Ana Maria Brânză	12

Final
(Estonia) Julia Beljajeva	4
(Hungary) Emese Szász	12

Third place
(China) Xu Anqi	15
(Romania) Ana Maria Brânză	10
