= Raluca Sbîrcia =

Romanian fencer

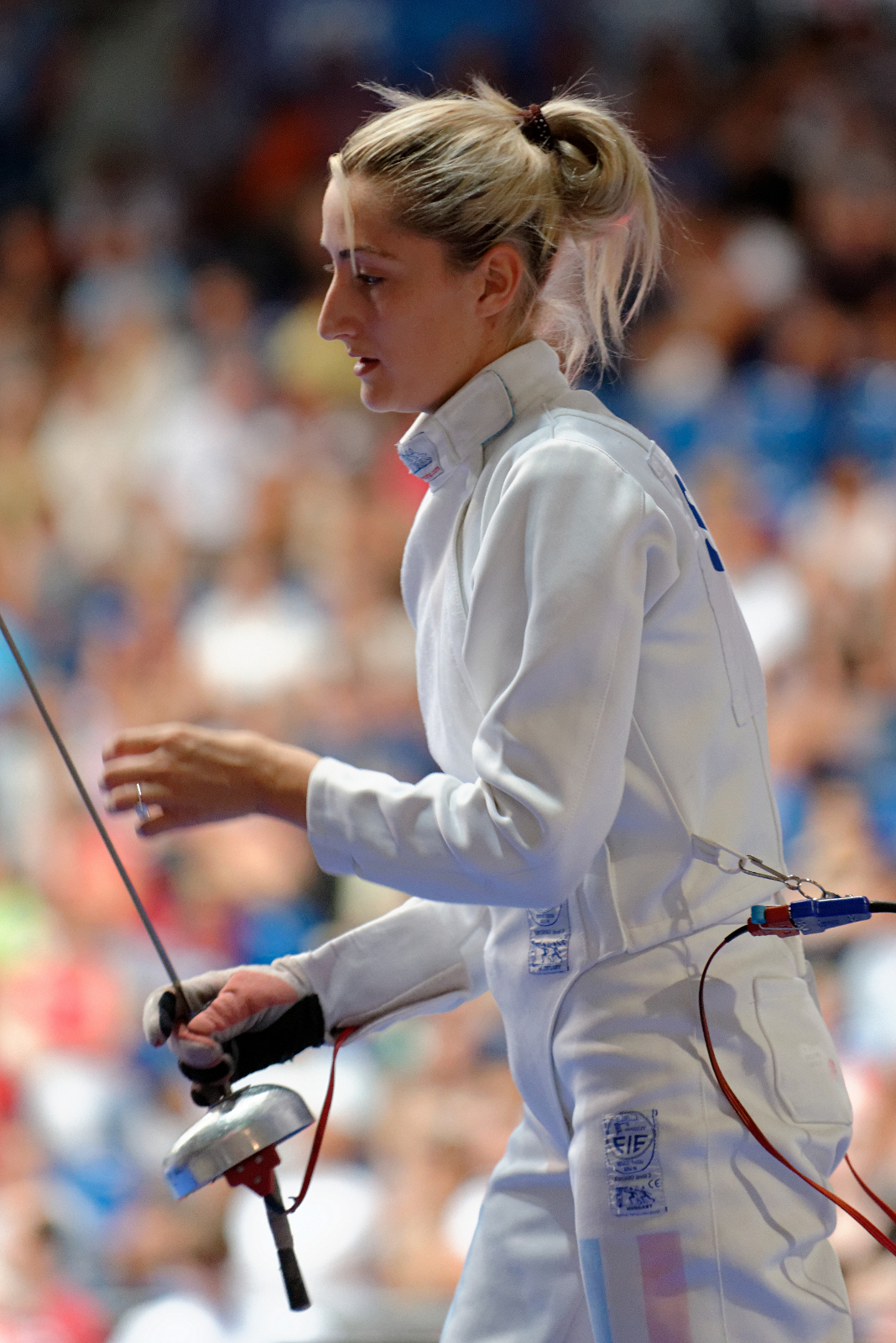
- Sbîrcia at the 2013 World Fencing Championships

Personal information
- Full name: Raluca Cristina Sbîrcia
- Born: 4 July 1989 (age 37) Craiova, Oltenia
- Home town: Craiova

Fencing career
- Sport: Fencing
- Weapon: Épée
- Hand: right-handed
- National coach: Octavian Zidaru
- Club: CS Universitatea Craiova
- Head coach: Mircea Alecu, Dumitru Popescu
- FIE ranking: current ranking
Medal record
Representing Romania
World Championships
Bronze medal – third place	2013 Budapest	Team Épée
European Championships
Bronze medal – third place	2017 Tbilisi	Team Épée

Raluca Sbîrcia (born 14 July 1989) is a Romanian épée fencer, bronze medallist in the 2013 World Fencing Championships.

Sbârcia joined the Romanian national team in 2012 after Simona Gherman, Loredana Dinu, and Anca Măroiu took a post-Olympic break. Together with Maria Udrea, Simona Pop, and captain Ana Maria Brânză, she won a bronze medal in the Leipzig, Saint-Maur, and Rio stages of the team World Cup. She was replaced by Amalia Tătăran for the European Championships in Zagreb, but was selected again for the World Championships in Budapest. In the individual event, she was defeated by a single hit in the first round by Poland's Renata Knapik. In the team event, Romania reached easily the quarter-finals, where they defeated South Korea, before losing to Russia in the semi-finals. They prevailed over France in the small final and came away with the bronze medal.

In the 2013–14 season, Sbîrcia was a part of the team that won a gold medal in the Doha World Cup and a bronze medal in the Barcelona World Cup. She, however, lost her spot as Simona Gherman returned to competition and was reinstated into the national team as No.2.

Her brother Alin is also a fencer.
