= Yulen Pereira =

Spanish fencer

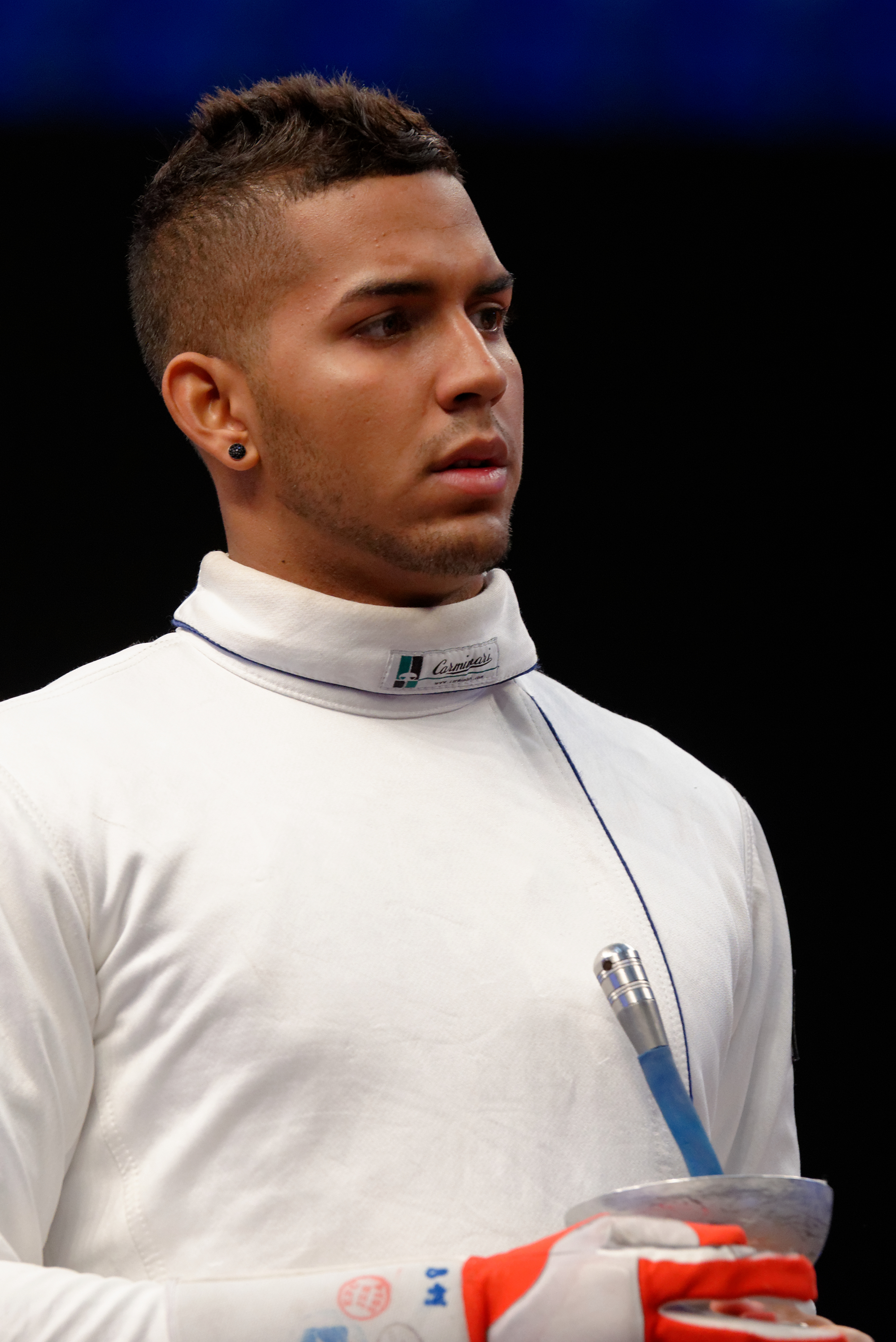
- Pereira at the 2014 Paris World Cup

Personal information
- Full name: Yulen Alexander Pereira Ramos
- Born: 12 July 1995 (age 31) Madrid
- Home town: Las Rozas de Madrid
- Height: 1.85 m (6 ft 1 in)
- Weight: 75 kg (165 lb)

Fencing career
- Sport: Fencing
- Weapon: Épée
- Hand: right-handed
- National coach: Manuel Pereira
- Club: Club Olimpo de Esgrima
- FIE ranking: current ranking
Medal record
Men's épée
Representing Spain
European Championships
Silver medal – second place	2014 Strasbourg	Team
Bronze medal – third place	2024 Basel	Team
Junior World Championships
Bronze medal – third place	2015 Tashkent	Individual
Mediterranean Games
Gold medal – first place	2018 Tarragona	Individual

Yulen Pereira (born 12 July 1995) is a Spanish épée fencer, silver team medallist in the 2014 European Fencing Championships.

== Career ==
Pereira is the son of Manuel Pereira, Spain's only World champion in épée. He began playing with plastic and foam swords at home when he was four before taking up fencing proper.

His first major medal was a bronze in the 2011 Cadets European Championships in Klagenfurt. In the 2012–13 season he won a bronze medal in the Junior European Championships in Budapest and a silver medal in the Junior World Championships in Poreč. These results caused him to be selected into the senior national team along with José Luis Abajo, Pau Roselló, and Elías Casado. His first senior competition was the Senior World Championships in Budapest. In the individual event, he defeated Switzerland's Benjamin Steffen in the first round, but was stopped right afterwards by World No.1 Rubén Limardo. In the team event, Spain was defeated by Poland in the table of 32. Pereira finished the season No.4 in Junior World rankings.

In the 2013–14 season he earned a silver medal in the European Junior Championships in Jerusalem. He also took part in his first senior Fencing World Cup competition, the Trophée Monal in Paris, where he defeated World No.15 Park Sang-young of Korea, but ceded in the second round to France's Jonathan Bonnaire. At the European Championships in Strasbourg, he was defeated in the second round by Maksym Khvorost of Ukraine. In the team event, Spain created an upset by overcoming France, then Russia. They were defeated by reigning European champions Switzerland and came away with a silver medal in the first European podium for Spanish fencing since Jorge Pina's gold in sabre at the 2007 edition in Ghent. At the World Championships in Kazan Pereira was eliminated by Bas Verwijlen in the preliminary table of 64. In the team event, Spain edged out Kazakhstan in the table of 64, but were defeated by Hungary and finished 15th. Pereira ended up World No.1 in Junior rankings.
