= Women's team épée at the 2013 World Fencing Championships =

The Women's team épée event of the 2013 World Fencing Championships was held on August 11, 2013.

== Medalists ==
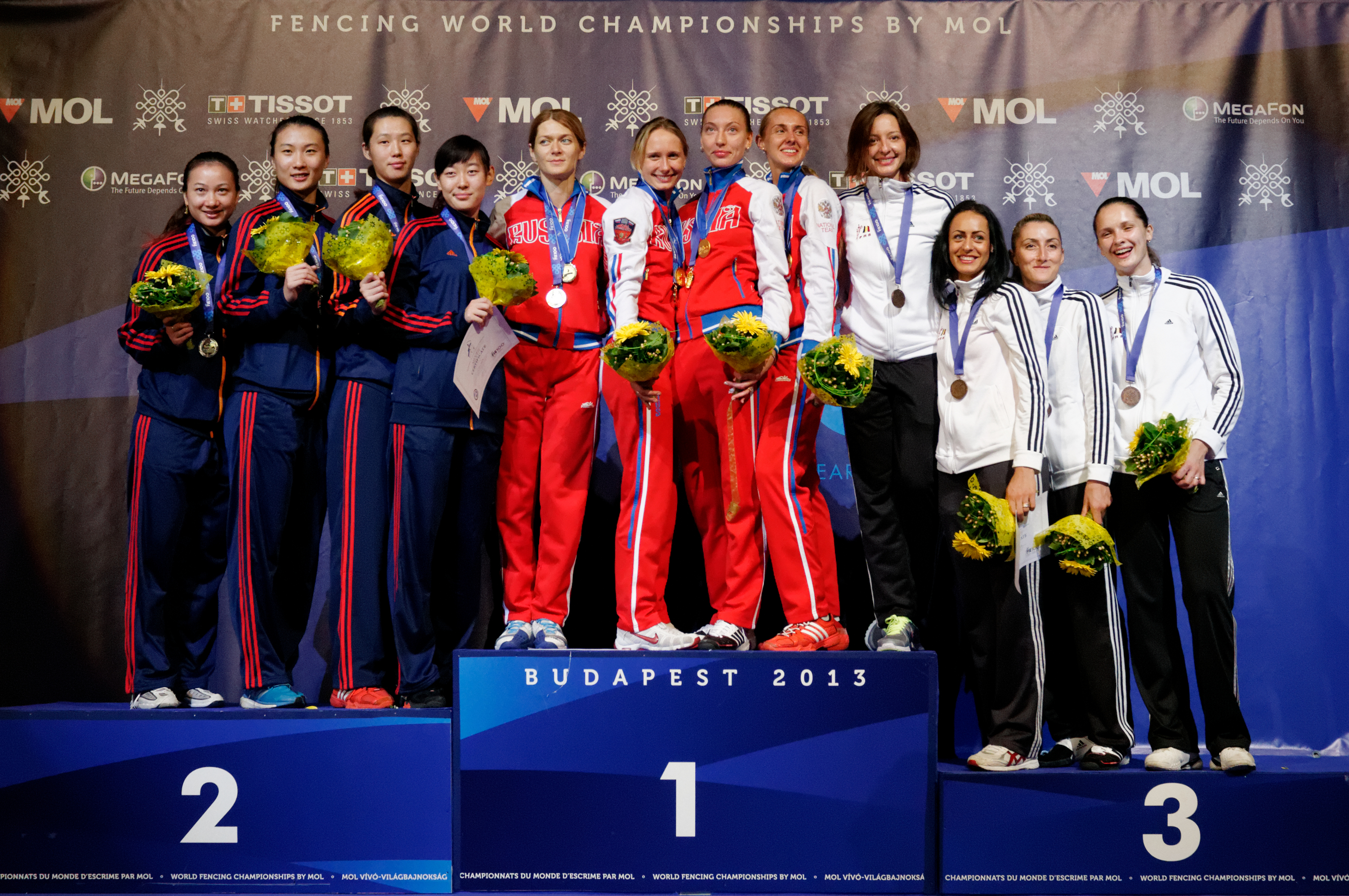
On the podium, from left to right: China, Russia and Romania

Gold	Russia; Tatyana Andryushina; Violetta Kolobova; Anna Sivkova; Yana Zvereva
Silver	China; Hou Yingming; Luo Xiaojuan; Sun Yiwen; Xu Anqi
Bronze	Romania; Ana Maria Brânză; Simona Pop; Raluca Sbîrcia; Maria Udrea

== Draw ==
=== Finals ===
Final
1	China	28
2	Russia	34

Third place
1	France	28
2	Romania	33

=== Top half ===
Round of 32
Kazakhstan	42
Switzerland	45
Estonia	45
Mexico	21
Israel	29
Hungary	45
United States	45
Mongolia	9
South Africa	26
France	45
Poland	45
Canada	34
Serbia	37
Ukraine	45

Round of 16
China	31
Switzerland	20
Estonia	45
Hungary	34
United States	27
France	35
Poland	42
Ukraine	43

Quarterfinals
China	45
Estonia	35
France	45
Ukraine	37

Semifinals
China	45
France	41

=== Bottom half ===
Round of 32
Romania	45
Denmark	14
Venezuela	40
Hong Kong	35
Sweden	45
Uzbekistan	19
Singapore	28
South Korea	45
Italy	45
Finland	27
Japan	26
Germany	45
Brazil	44
Chinese Taipei	45
Australia	34
Russia	45

Round of 16
Romania	45
Venezuela	30
Sweden	40
South Korea	45
Italy	38
Germany	26
Chinese Taipei	19
Russia	45

Quarterfinals
Romania	36
South Korea	32
Italy	27
Russia	28

Semifinals
Romania	33
Russia	44

=== Placement rounds ===
==== 5–8th place ====
5–8th place semifinals
Estonia	43
Ukraine	45
South Korea	35
Italy	36

5th place
Ukraine	26
Italy	45
7th place
Estonia	45
South Korea	35

==== 9–16th place ====
9–16th place quarterfinals
Switzerland	32
Hungary	43
United States	45
Poland	44
Venezuela	39
Sweden	45
Germany	45
Chinese Taipei	28

9–12th place semifinals
Hungary	36
United States	27
Sweden	45
Germany	38

9th place
Hungary	45
Sweden	43
11th place
United States	34
Germany	42

==== 13–16th place ====
13–16th place semifinals
Switzerland	45
Poland	41
Venezuela	45
Chinese Taipei	30

13th place
Switzerland	45
Venezuela	41
15th place
Poland	45
Chinese Taipei	22

== Final classification ==
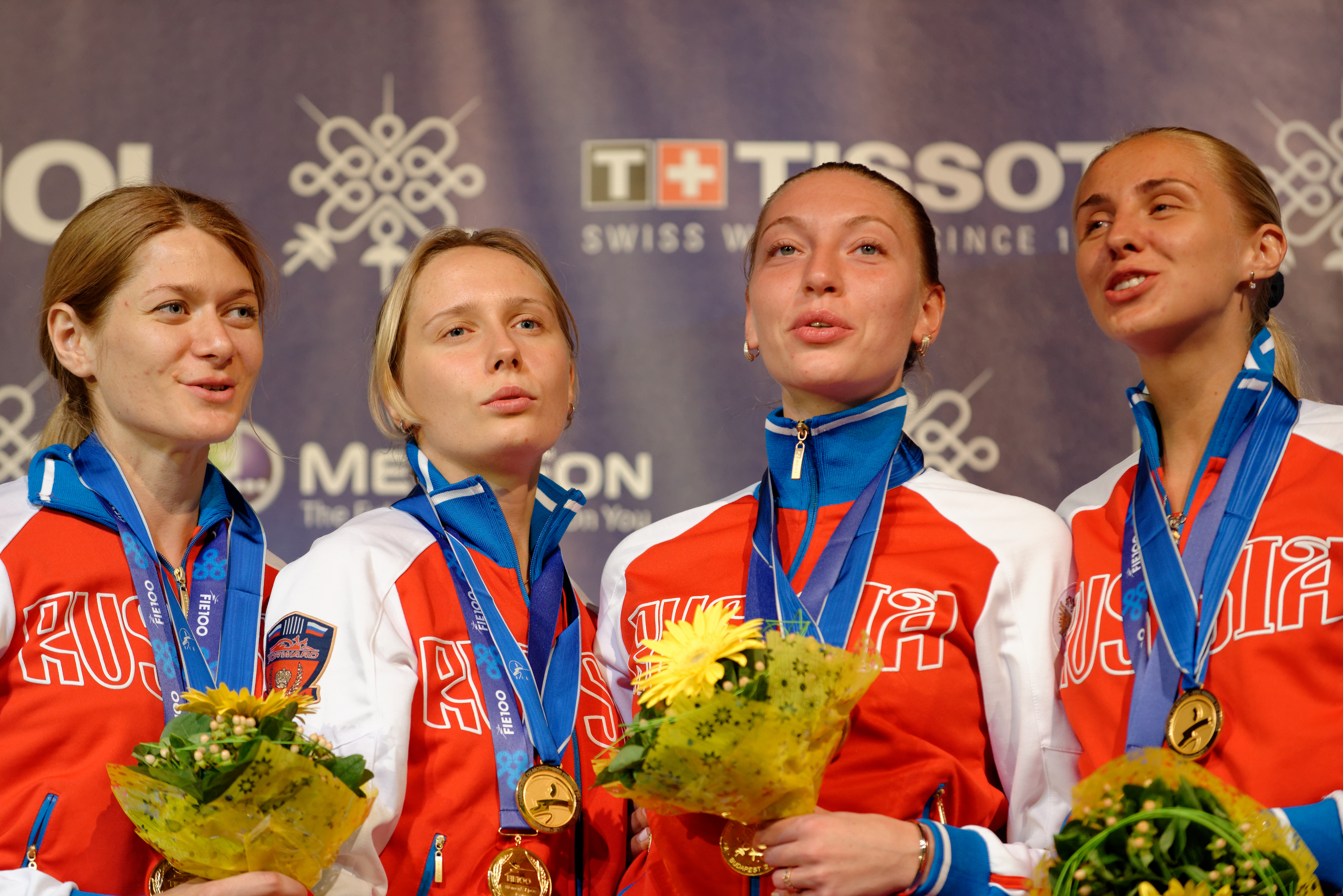
Team Russia sing their national anthem on the podium

Rank	Nation
1st place, gold medalist(s)	Russia
2nd place, silver medalist(s)	China
3rd place, bronze medalist(s)	Romania
4	France
5	Italy
6	Ukraine
7	Estonia
8	South Korea
9	Hungary
10	Sweden
11	Germany
12	United States
13	Switzerland
14	Venezuela
15	Poland
16	Chinese Taipei
17	Hong Kong
18	Brazil
19	Kazakhstan
20	Canada
21	South Africa
22	Uzbekistan
23	Japan
24	Mexico
25	Israel
26	Finland
27	Singapore
28	Mongolia
29	Serbia
30	Denmark
31	Australia
