= Fencing at the 2018 Mediterranean Games =

- Venue: La Selva del Camp Pavilion
- Dates: 24–25 June

The fencing competitions at the 2018 Mediterranean Games took place on 24 and 25 June at the La Selva del Camp Pavilion in La Selva del Camp.

Athletes will compete in 4 events. There will be no team events.

== Medal summary ==
=== Men's events ===
Event	Gold	Silver	Bronze
Individual épée	Yulen Pereira; Spain	Romain Cannone; France	Aymerick Gally; France Houssam El Kord; Morocco

=== Women's events ===
Event	Gold	Silver	Bronze
Individual épée	Roberta Marzani; Italy	Joséphine Jacques-André-Coquin; France	Nicol Foietta; Italy Lauren Rembi; France
Individual foil	Inès Boubakri; Tunisia	Valentina De Costanzo; Italy	Jéromine Mpah-Njanga; France Julie Mienville; France
Individual sabre	Azza Besbes; Tunisia	Sofia Ciargalia; Italy	Lucía Martín-Portugués; Spain Despina Georgiadou; Greece

== Medal table ==
Rank	Nation	Gold	Silver	Bronze	Total
1	Tunisia	2	0	0	2
2	Italy	1	2	1	4
3	Spain*	1	0	1	2
4	France	0	2	4	6
5	Greece	0	0	1	1
5	Morocco	0	0	1	1
Totals (6 entries)		4	4	8	16
