= Gaëlle Gebet =

French fencer (born 1984)

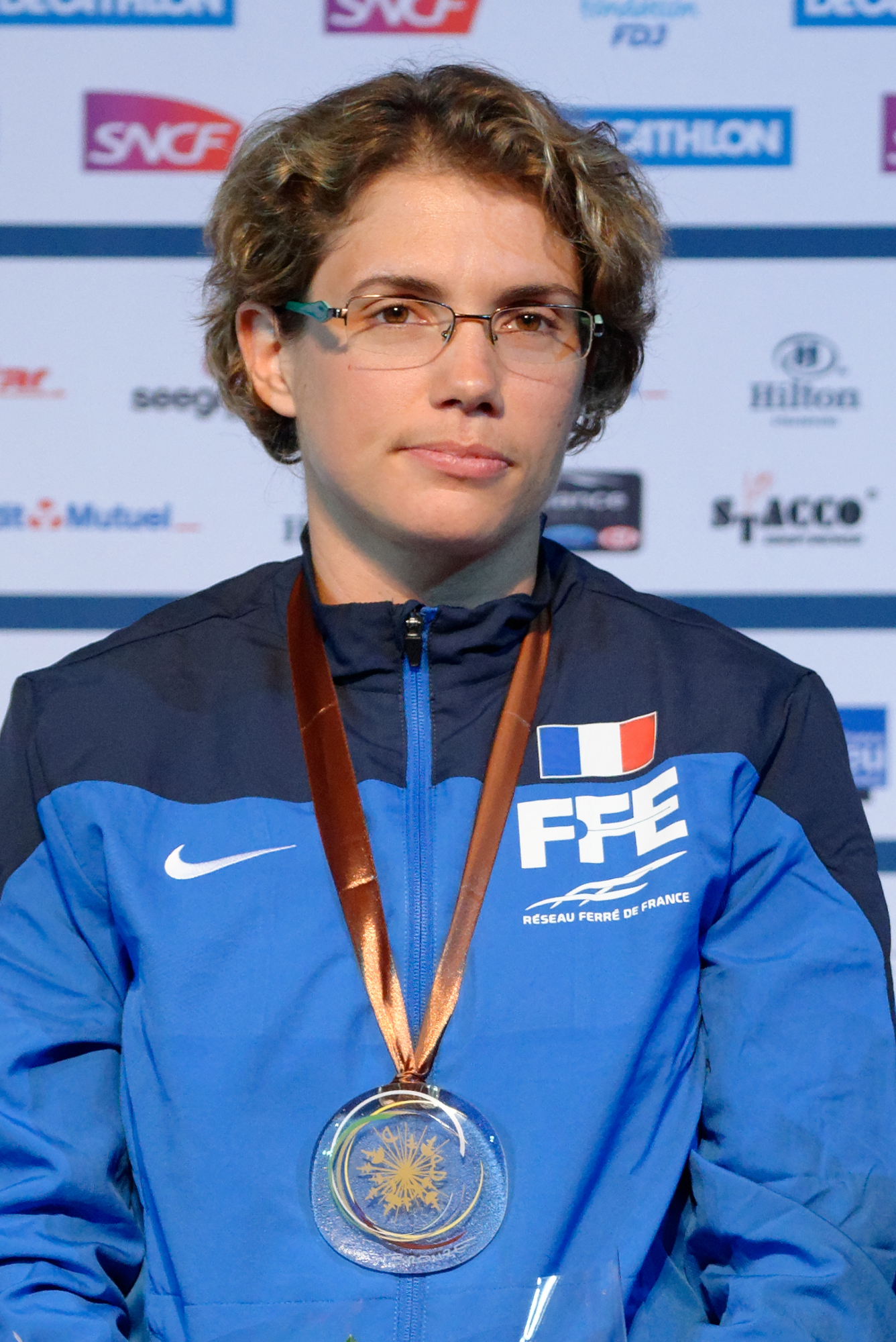
- Gebet at the 2014 European Fencing Championships

Personal information
- Nickname: Gallou
- Nationality: French
- Born: 29 June 1984 (age 42) Tours, France
- Height: 1.67 m (5 ft 5 1/2 in)
- Weight: 62 kg (137 lb)

Fencing career
- Sport: Fencing
- Weapon: foil
- Hand: left-handed
- National coach: Franck Boidin, Émeric Clos
- Club: AS Bourg la Reine
- Head coach: Yann Détienne
- FIE ranking: current ranking
Medal record
World Championships
Bronze medal – third place	2014 Kazan	Team
Bronze medal – third place	2016 Rio de Janeiro	Team
European Games
Silver medal – second place	2015 Baku	Team
European Championships
Bronze medal – third place	2014 Strasbourg	Team

Gaëlle Gebet (born 29 June 1984) is a French foil fencer, bronze medallist at the 2014 World Fencing Championships.

== Career ==
Gebet took up fencing at the age of six at her local club in Beynes. She earned a bronze medal at the 2004 Junior World Championships in Plovdiv. In 2010, she was selected into the French national senior team that ranked 5th in the European Championships and the World Championships. The 2013–14 season saw her win a bronze medal both in the European Championships and the World Championships. The next season she climb her first individual World Cup podium with a bronze medal in Cancún.

Alongside her career as an athlete, Gebet is a police officer.
