= Julianna Révész =

Hungarian fencer

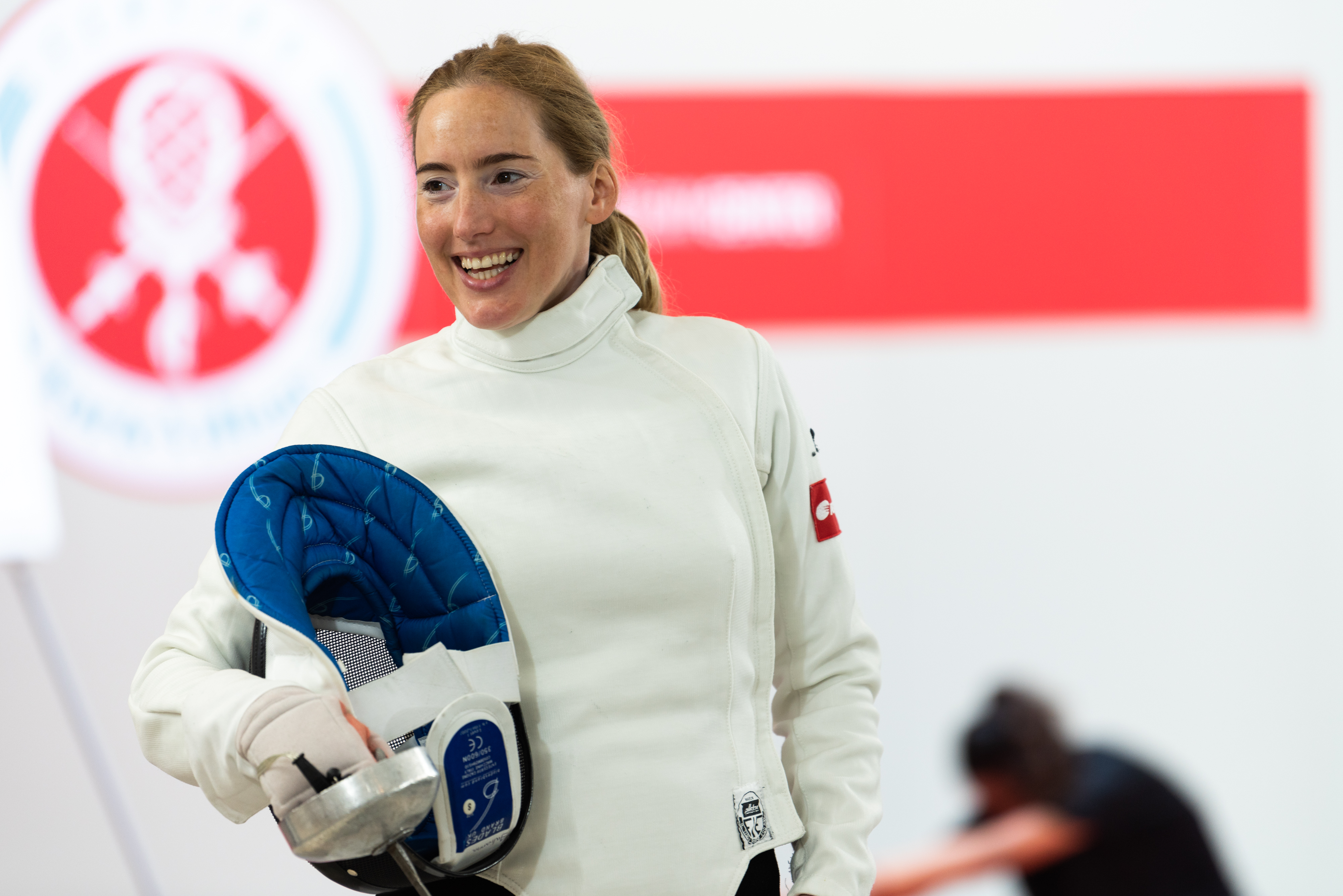

Personal information
- Nationality: Hungarian; British
- Born: 24 January 1983 (age 43)
- Height: 165 cm (5 ft 5 in)
- Weight: 55 kg (121 lb)

Fencing career
- Sport: Fencing
- Weapon: Epée
- Hand: Right-handed
- Club: Knightsbridge Fencing Club
- Personal coach: Iván Kovács
- FIE ranking: Current ranking
Medal record
Women's épée
Representing Hungary
World Championships
Silver medal – second place	2005 Lisbon	Team
European Championships
Bronze medal – third place	2013 Zagreb	Team

Julianna Révész (born 24 January 1983) is a Hungarian épée fencer. With Hungary she won a silver medal in the 2005 World Fencing Championships in Leipzig and a bronze medal in the 2013 European Fencing Championships in Zagreb. She is the co-founder of Knightsbridge Fencing Club along with Tamas Kovacs.

== Career ==
Révész's parents wanted to choose a sport for her in which Hungarians were traditionally successful, such as fencing. At age 8 she was taken to the Erdert Medosz Fencing Club, where she fell in love with the sport. She did one year of footwork and private lesson with foil. Later she changed to épée when she transferred to BVSC Fencing Club. As soon as she started to compete in children's tournaments, people recognized her talent for fencing. Révész became Hungarian National Champion in all age categories from children to adult, in both individual and team events. Her first coaches were Zoltán Beszédes and Lászlo Kőrösi.

Révész won a bronze medal at the 2001 Junior European Championships in Keszthely.

In 2001 Révész moved to Germany Tauberbischofsheim where she studied and fenced full-time at the famous Tauberbischofsheim Fecht Club. Her trainer was Mariusz Strzałka. In 2002 she was ranked no.1 in the world and was winner of the World Cup series. Two years later she moved back to Hungary. From 2005 to 2008 she represented Team Hungary at the World and European Championships.

Amongst seniors, she was a member of the Hungarian team that won a silver medal in the 2005 World Fencing Championships in Leipzig and a bronze medal in the 2013 European Fencing Championships in Zagreb. In the 2014 Doha Grand Prix she earned her first podium in the Fencing World Cup after defeating world no.1 Ana Maria Brânză 8–7 in the quarter-finals. Révész was stopped in the semi-finals by Tiffany Géroudet and won a bronze medal.

In 2009, Révész founded Knightsbridge Fencing Club in London along with Tamás Kovács.

2015	World Championship in Moscow 5th (team)
2014	World Championship in Kazan 22nd (individual)
2014	European Championship in Zagreb, bronze medal (team)
2014	Winner of Leipzig World Cup (team)
2013	World Cup Doha, bronze medal (individual)
2013	World Championships Budapest 22nd (ind) and 9th (team)
2013	European Championships Zagreb 13th (ind) and bronze medal
2013	Winner of Hungarian National Championships (individual)
2012	British National Champion (team)
2012	Winner of Cardiff Open (ind)
2012	Winner of Bristol Open (ind)
2010	Winner of London Open (ind)
2010	Winner of Cardiff Open (ind)
2010	Winner of Essex Open (ind)
2010	British National Champion (team)
2009	British National Champion (team)
2008	World Cup Athens 8th Place (ind)
2006	Winner of Saint-Maur World Cup (team)
2005	World Championships Leipzig, silver medal (team)
2005	Leipzig World Championships, part of Hungarian Women's Epee team, silver medal
2005	European Championship Zalaegerszeg 8th (ind)
2002	Ranked no 1 in the World and winner of the World Cup series
2001	Junior European Championship Antalya, bronze medal (team)
2001	Winner of World Cup in Bratislawa
2000	Junior European Championship Keszthely, bronze medal (ind)
2000	Winner of World Cup Tauberbischofsheim (ind)
2000	Winner of Junior World Women's Epee (ind)

== Personal life ==
Révész has lived in London, United Kingdom since 2008 with her husband, and child.
