= Anna Sivkova =

Russian fencer

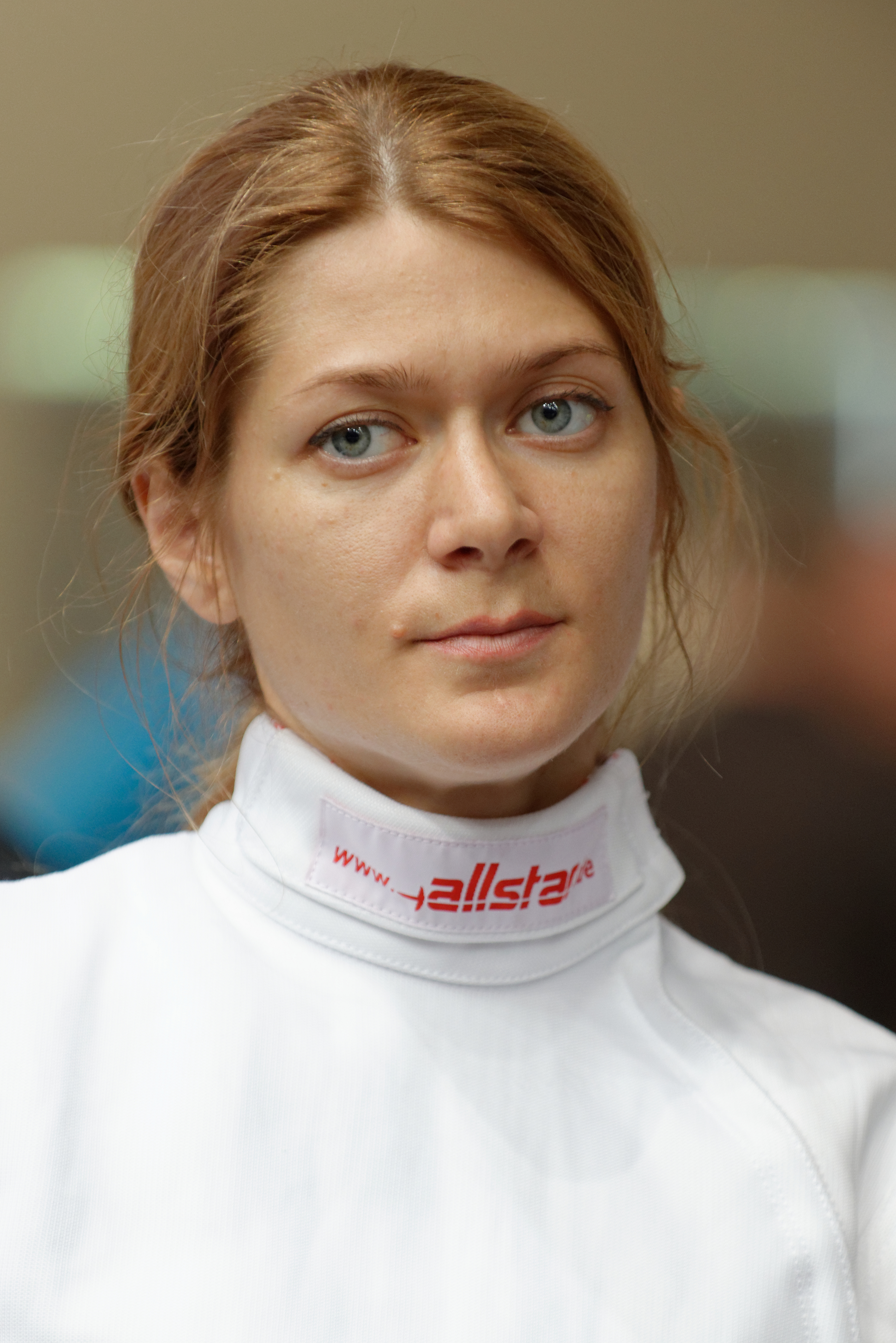
- At the 2013 World Fencing Championships

Personal information
- Full name: Anna Vitalyevna Sivkova
- Nickname: Anya
- Born: 12 April 1982 (age 44) Moscow, Soviet Union
- Home town: Moscow
- Height: 1.72 m (5 ft 8 in)
- Weight: 59 kg (130 lb)

Fencing career
- Sport: Fencing
- Weapon: Épée
- Hand: Right-handed
- National coach: Aleksandr Glazunov
- Club: CSKA Moscow
- FIE ranking: current ranking
Medal record
Women's épée fencing
Representing Russia
Olympic Games
Gold medal – first place	2004 Athens	Team épée
World Championships
Gold medal – first place	2001 Nîmes	Team épée
Gold medal – first place	2003 Havana	Team épée
Gold medal – first place	2013 Budapest	Team épée
Silver medal – second place	2007 St Petersburg	Team épée
Silver medal – second place	2013 Budapest	Individual épée
European Championships
Gold medal – first place	2012 Legnano	Team épée
Silver medal – second place	2001 Coblenz	Team épée
Silver medal – second place	2004 Copenhagen	Individual épée
Silver medal – second place	2009 Plovdiv	Individual épée
Silver medal – second place	2011 Sheffield	Team épée
Bronze medal – third place	2008 Kyiv	Individual épée

Anna Vitalyevna Sivkova (Russian: Анна Витальевна Сивкова; born 12 April 1982) is a Russian épée fencer, 2004 Olympic team champion., three-time World team champion (2001, 2003, and 2013) and European team champion in 2012.

== Career ==
Sivkova discovered fencing at the age of 10 on the advice of a family friend, who knew a fencing coach. She took up the sport at SDUShOR (sports school) No.7 near the Borisov Ponds in Moscow, where she first practiced foil under the coaching of Lyudmila Vyazovaya. After a year Vyazovaya switched to épée; Sivkova followed the move. She was the only girl at her club, but she found that winning against boys motivated her. After two years of training she began to resent the hard discipline and left for a while; she came back when she realised she needed fencing to let off steam.

Sivkova won the 1997 Cadet World Championships at Tenerife. Her silver medal in the 1998 World Youth Games made her realise she could become a champion. She then took a silver medal at the 1999 Junior World Championships at Keszthely and the gold at the 2000 Junior European Championships in Antalya. She joined the senior national team in 2001. Her first competition with Russia was the European Championships in Coblenz, where they took the silver medal. They went on to win the gold medal in the World Championships in Nîmes. She climbed in 2003 her first podium in the Fencing World Cup with a gold medal in Prague and two bronzes in Tauberbischofsheim and Havana. She also reached the quarter-finals in the World Championships in Havana. These results pushed her to 6th place in world rankings.

The 2004 Summer Olympics in Athens were her first Olympic experience. In the individual event she was defeated in the first round by reigning Olympic Champion Tímea Nagy. In the team event, Russia overcame South Korea in the quarter-finals, then Canada. Sivkova's poor performance in her semi-final bouts prompted head coach Aleksandr Kislyunin to keep her as reserve in the final against Germany, which she took as a personal blow at the time. Russia eventually defeated Germany 34–28, allowing Sivkova to become Olympic team champion.

The two following years were more difficult for Sivkova. As team épée was not included in the programme of the 2008 Summer Olympics, she had to enter the Top 8 to gain qualification, but her World Cup results were not good enough. After teammate Tatiana Logunova obtained her qualification, Sivkova had to get into the European Top 3 to go to Beijing. In the St Petersburg World Cup, the penultimate qualifying tournament, Sivkova was defeated by Romania's Ana Maria Brânză, who won the gold medal and one of the three European Olympic tickets. Coach Aleksandr Kislyunin decided Lyubov Shutova had better chances of getting qualified and chose not to send Sivkova to the last qualifying tournament in Florina.

At the London Olympics, Sivkova defeated Jung Hyo-jung of Korea in the table of 32, but was stopped in the next round by Romania's Anca Măroiu. In the team event, Russia prevailed over Ukraine, then met China in the semi-finals. Sivkova entered the piste on the last relay with China on the lead. She levelled the score, but lost by one touch in overtime, and Russia came away with no medal. Deeply upset by these failures, Sivkova took a break and did not go back to training before January 2013.
