= Joséphine Jacques-André-Coquin =

French fencer

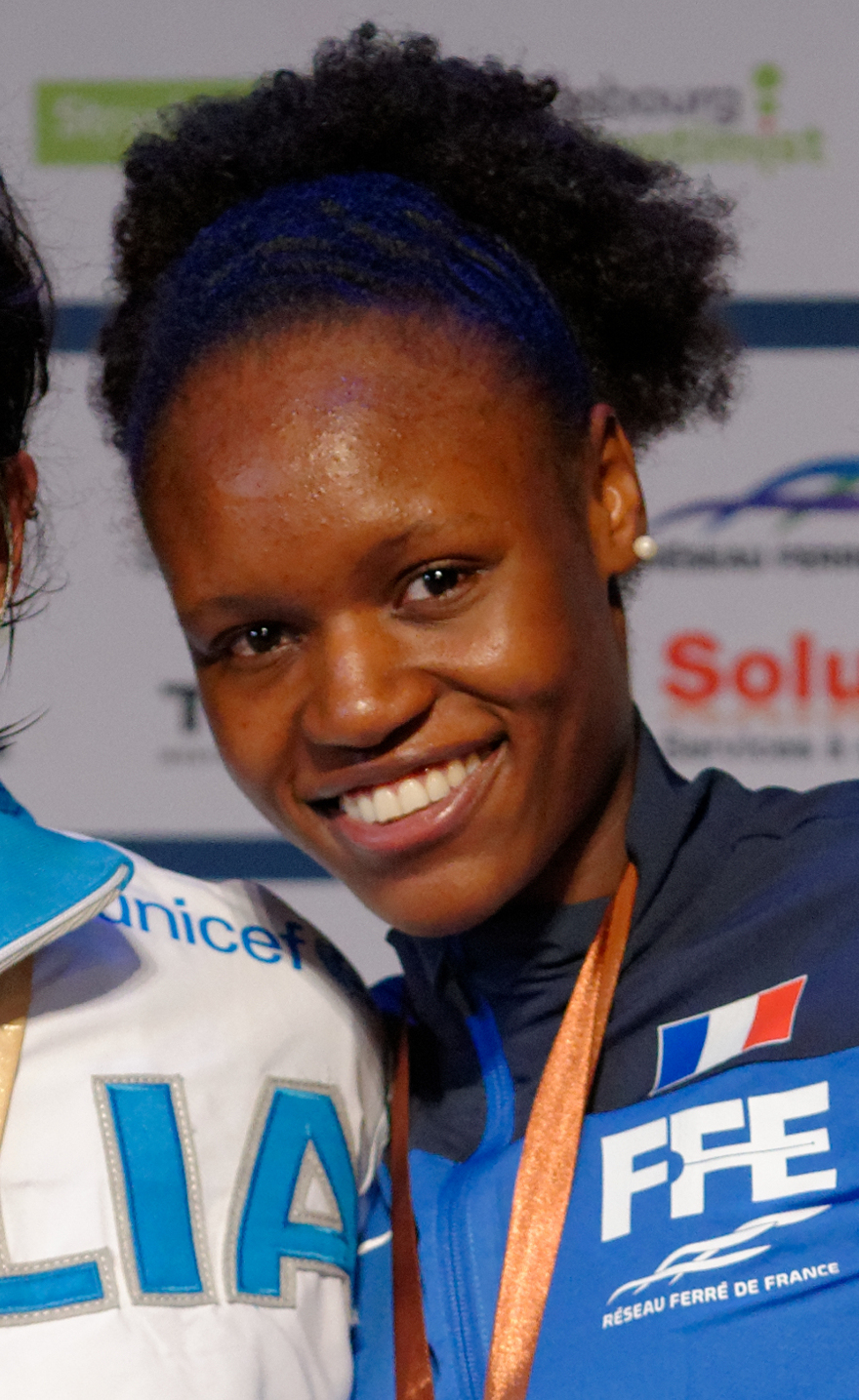

Personal information
- Nationality: French
- Born: 21 September 1990 (age 36)
- Height: 1.70 m (5 ft 7 in)
- Weight: 51 kg (112 lb)

Sport
- Country: France
- Sport: Fencing
Medal record
Women's épée
Representing France
European Championships
Silver medal – second place	2016 Toruń	Team
Bronze medal – third place	2011 Sheffield	Team
Bronze medal – third place	2014 Strasbourg	Individual
Mediterranean Games
Silver medal – second place	2018 Tarragona	Individual

Joséphine Jacques-André-Coquin (born 21 September 1990) is a French right-handed épée fencer, 2022 team European champion, and 2016 Olympian.

== Medal Record ==
=== European Championship ===
Year	Location	Event	Position
2014	Strasbourg, France	Individual Women's Épée	3rd
2016	Toruń, Poland	Team Women's Épée	2nd
2022	Antalya, Turkey	Team Women's Épée	1st

=== Grand Prix ===
Date	Location	Event	Position
2013-02-02	Budapest, Hungary	Individual Women's Épée	3rd

=== World Cup ===
Date	Location	Event	Position
2012-06-29	Leipzig, Germany	Individual Women's Épée	1st
2021-11-19	Tallinn, Estonia	Individual Women's Épée	1st
