= Pau Roselló =

Spanish fencer (born 1990)

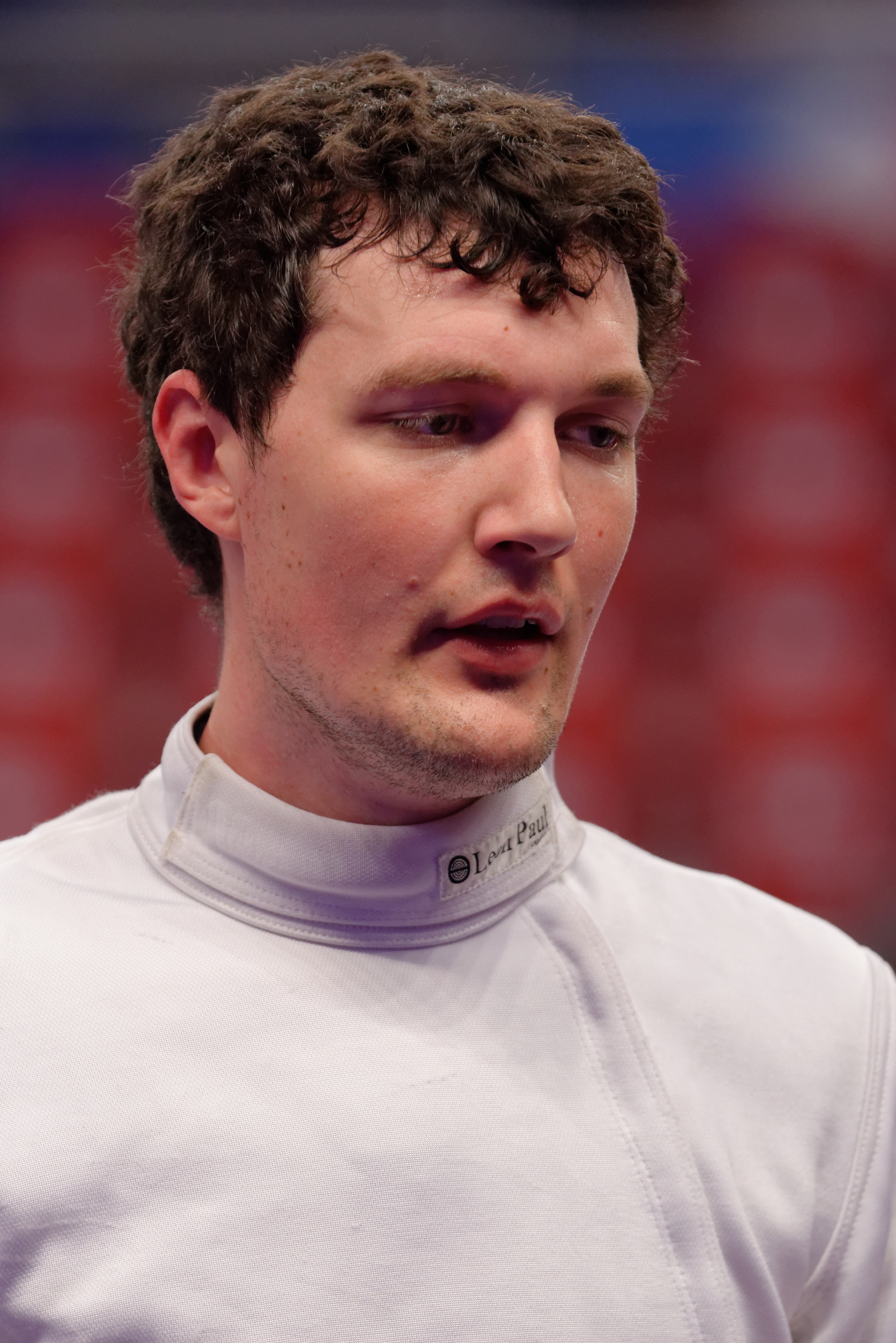

Personal information
- Full name: Pau Rosello Van Schoor
- Born: 25 February 1990 (age 36) Amposta, Catalonia, Spain
- Home town: Barcelona

Fencing career
- Sport: Fencing
- Weapon: Épée
- Hand: right-handed
- FIE ranking: current ranking
Medal record
Men's Épée
Representing Spain
Silver medal – second place	2014 Strasbourg	Team épée

Pau Roselló (born 25 February 1990) is a Spanish épée fencer, silver team medallist in the 2014 European Fencing Championships.

== Career ==
Rosello won the 2007 Cadet European Championships in Novi Sad and the 2007 Cadet World Championships in Belek. The year after he earned a bronze medal at the 2008 Junior World Championships. These results caused him to be selected into the Spanish épée national team. He took part in the 2012 European Championships and the 2013 European and 2013 World Championships. In the 2013–14 season Spain created a surprise by defeating favourites France in the quarter-finals, then Russia in the semi-finals. They lost to Switzerland in the final and took a silver medal, Spain's first continental podium since Jorge Pina's gold medal at Gand 2007.

Rosello graduated in computer science from the Polytechnic University of Catalonia and the Technical University of Madrid. With fellow high-level épée fencer Sergio Baldrés he founded Insignia Esgrima SCP, a fencing kit supplier that kits out the Spanish national fencing team.
