= Maria Udrea =

Romanian fencer

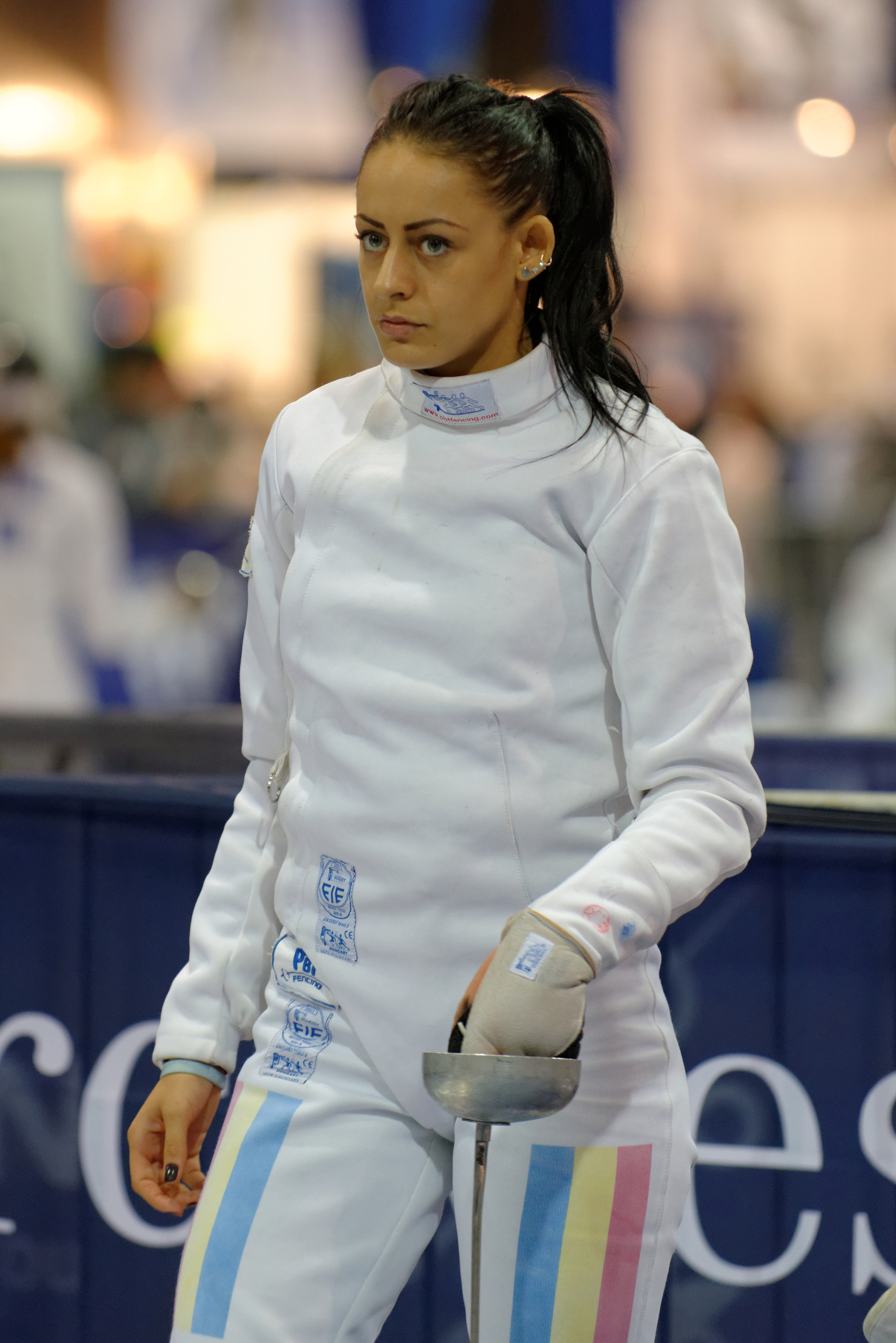
- Udrea at the 2013 World Fencing Championships

Personal information
- Full name: Maria Ruxandra Udrea
- Born: 23 November 1990 (age 35) Bucharest, Romania

Fencing career
- Sport: Fencing
- Country: Romania
- Weapon: Épée
- Hand: Left-handed
- National coach: Dan Podeanu
- Club: CSA Steaua București
- Head coach: Gheorghe Epurescu; Cornel Milan; Octavian Zidaru (previous)
- FIE ranking: current ranking
Medal record
World Championships
| Bronze medal – third place | 2013 Budapest | Team épée |
European Championships
| Gold medal – first place | 2014 Strasbourg | Team épée |
| Silver medal – second place | 2013 Zagreb | Team épée |

Maria Ruxandra Udrea (born 23 Novembre 1990) is a Romanian épée fencer. She won a team silver medal in the 2013 European Fencing Championships in Zagreb and a bronze medal in the 2013 World Fencing Championships in Budapest.

== Biography ==
Udrea's first sports were swimming and tennis. She discovered fencing at the age of seven at Olimpia Bucharest, and took to the sport. She first competed in foil. In this weapon, she won a silver medal in the 2008 Cadet European Championships at Novi Sad, a gold medal in the Junior World Cup in 2009, a bronze medal in the Junior European Championships at Odense that same year, and a silver medal in the 2010 Romanian Championship.

In the 2008–09 season, she joined the national senior team, which placed 4th in the World Championships in Antalya after being defeated by Italy in the semi-final, then by Germany in the match for the bronze medal. The year after, Romania were knocked out by Venezuela in the first round of the World Championships in Paris. The lack of results and funds pushed the Romanian Fencing Federation into dissolving the national foil team in early 2011. Udrea then turned to épée.

Udrea joined the national Romanian épée team after the reshuffling that followed the London 2012 Summer Olympics. In December 2012 she won the gold medal in the Belgrade Trophy, a satellite event of the Fencing World Cup. In 2013, she earned a bronze in the team competition of the Saint-Maur World Cup. With her club, CSA Steaua București, she ranked second in the European Cup in Naples. In March 2013, she won a silver medal in the Romanian national championship after being defeated in the final by teammate Ana Maria Brânză, with which she won a team gold medal. In July, Udrea won a silver team medal with Brânză, Simona Pop and Amalia Tătăran in the 2013 European Championships in Zagreb. In the 2013 World Championships at Budapest, she was defeated in the table of 32 by Italy's Rossella Fiamingo, but earned the team bronze. She ended up 47th in the 2012–13 Fencing World Cup.

In the 2013–14 season, Udrea was selected as reserve for the 2014 European Championships in Strasbourg. In the individual event, she was stopped in the table of 64 by France's Marie-Florence Candassamy, who eventually won the silver medal. In the team competition, No.2 seed Romania received a bye, then disposed of Ukraine 45–31, beat Italy 29–24 in the semi-final and overcame Russia 38–34 in a very tight and tactical final, allowing Udrea to win her first international gold medal. Udrea did not compete in the World Championships in Kazan as Ana Maria Constantin was selected as reserve in her place.
