= Simona Pop =

Romanian fencer (born 1988)

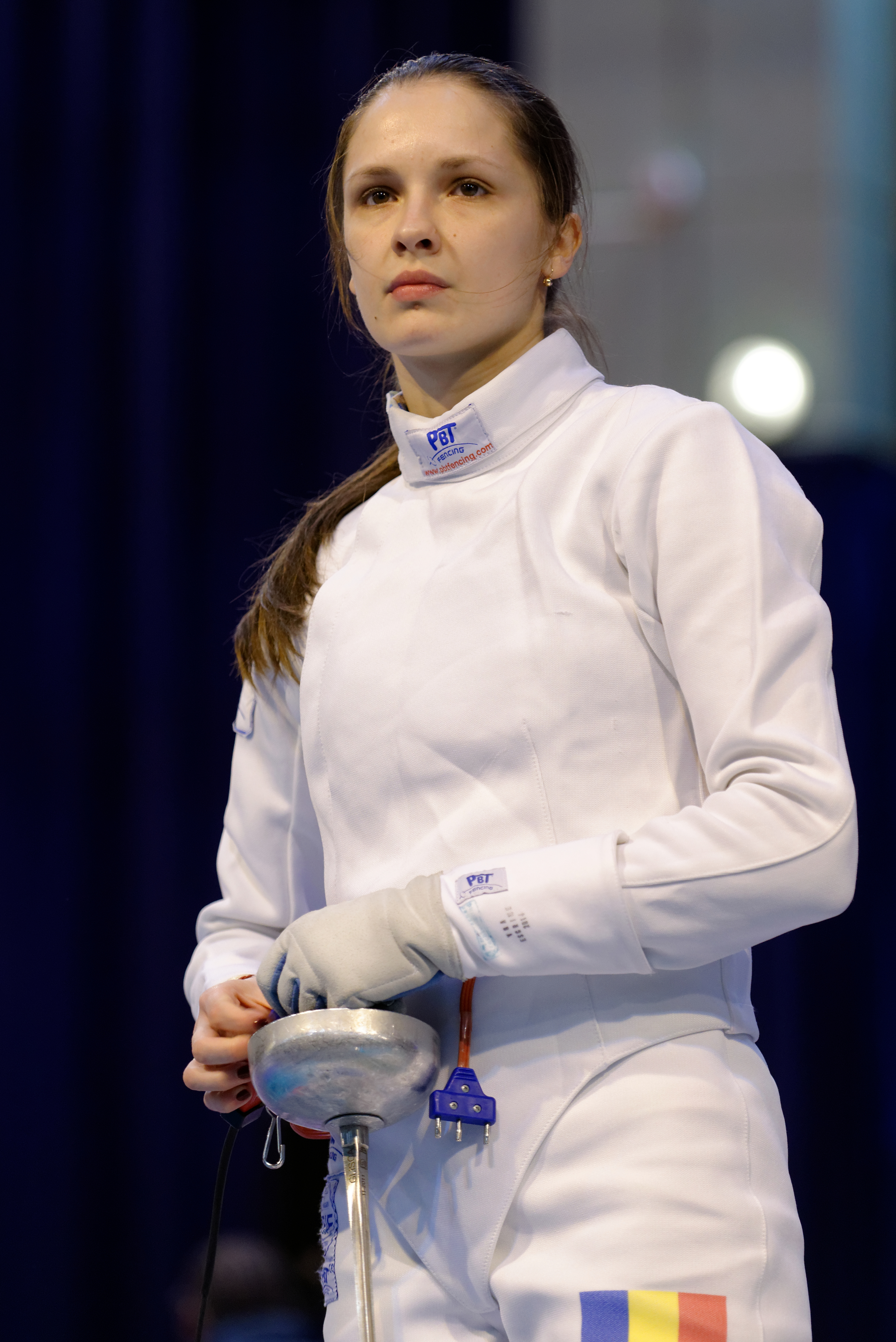
- Pop in 2014

Personal information
- Born: Simona Deac; 25 December 1988 (age 37) Satu Mare, Romania
- Home town: Bucharest
- Height: 1.78 m (5 ft 10 in)
- Weight: 62 kg (137 lb; 9.8 st)

Fencing career
- Sport: Fencing
- Country: Romania
- Weapon: Épée
- Hand: Left-handed
- National coach: Dan Podeanu
- Club: CSA Steaua București
- Head coach: Gheorghe Epurescu, Cornel Milan
- FIE ranking: current ranking
Medal record
Olympic Games
Gold medal – first place	2016 Rio de Janeiro	Team
World Championships
Silver medal – second place	2015 Moscow	Team
Bronze medal – third place	2013 Budapest	Team
European Games
Gold medal – first place	2015 Baku	Team
European Championships
Gold medal – first place	2014 Strasbourg	Team
Gold medal – first place	2015 Montreux	Team
Silver medal – second place	2013 Zagreb	Team
Bronze medal – third place	2015 Montreux	Individual
Bronze medal – third place	2016 Toruń	Team

Simona Pop née Deac (born 25 December 1988) is a retired Romanian épée fencer, bronze medallist at the 2015 European Championships, team silver medallist in the 2015 World Fencing Championships and team European champion in 2014 and 2015.

== Personal life ==
Pop was born in Satu Mare to a Hungarian father and Romanian mother. Pop took up fencing at CS Satu Mare, one of the main fencing centres in Romania, under the coaching of Francisc Csiszar who went on to train her for twelve years.

She obtained her bacalaureat, majoring in mathematics and computer science, at the Mihai Eminescu National College. She studies accounting and information management at the Vasile Goldiș Western University of Arad.

In 2012, she married Adrian Pop, a member of Romania's national men's épée team.

== Career ==
Pop earned a silver medal at the 2008 Junior World Championships in Acireale, and another at the 2009 Summer Universiade in Belgrade. She was briefly selected for the national team during the injury of team captain Ana Maria Brânză, then served as reserve upon Brânză's return. She became Romania's number 2 in the reshuffling that followed the 2012 Summer Olympics and the retirement of Simona Gherman, Anca Măroiu, and Loredana Dinu. She also transferred to CSA Steaua București, of which national team colleagues Brânză and Maria Udrea are also members.

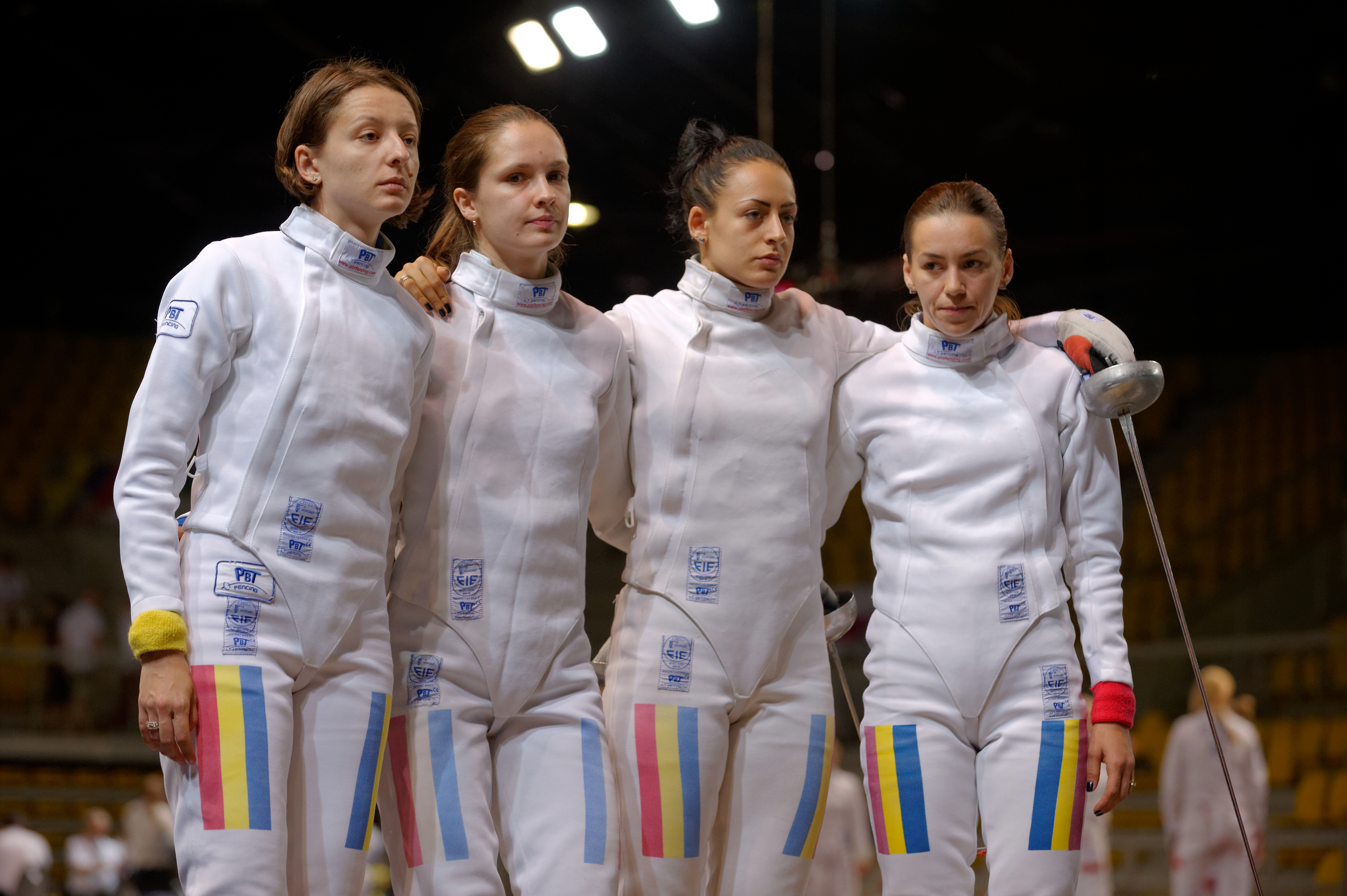
Pop (2nd to left) with the Romanian team at the 2014 European Championships

In the 2012–13 season Pop received a bronze team medal in the Saint-Maur World Cup, then a silver medal in the European Champion Clubs' Cup with CSA Steaua. She ranked 16th at the European Championships in Zagreb, but won a silver medal in the team event. She made it to the semi-finals in the 2013 Summer Universiade in Kazan, but was defeated by China's Sun Yiwen and took a bronze medal. At the 2013 World Championships in Budapest, she went past European silver medal Francesca Quondamcarlo, but was stopped in the table of 32 by Courtney Hurley of the United States. In the team event, Romania was defeated in the semi-finals by Russia, and competed against France in the match for the third place. Entering her last leg on a 21–24 score for France, Pop equalised 25–25 against Auriane Mallo, allowing team captain Ana Brânză to win the match. Pop finished the season at No. 26 in world rankings, a career best as of 2014.

In the 2013–14 season, Pop took a gold team medal at the Doha World Cup. At the European Championships she ceded in the first round to France's Joséphine Jacques-André-Coquin, who eventually won a bronze medal. In the team event, Romania easily prevailed over Ukraine, Pop being the main points contributor to the match. They had a tighter victory against Italy in the semi-final. In the final they met No.1 seed Russia. Pop was the first Romanian to win her bout against the Russians, allowing Brânză to equalize, then Gherman to close the match on a Romania victory. At the World Championships in Kazan, Pop was defeated by Auriane Mallo in the preliminary table of 64. In the team event, Romania was stopped in the quarter-finals by Italy and finished 5th after the placement rounds.

The 2014–15 season saw the return to competition in early 2015 of Anca Măroiu and Loredana Dinu. Pop kept however her place as Romanian No.3 thanks to a solid team performance, especially at the Buenos Aires World Cup where she posted a +14 total in the semi-finals against Russia and defeated Tatiana Logunova 8–0 in the eighth relay. In May, she won her first national championship after defeating teammate Anca Măroiu. In early June, she reached the semifinals at the 2015 European Championships, where she lost to reigning world champion Rossella Fiamingo, and came away with a bronze medal.

Pop competed for Romania at the 2016 Summer Olympics in both the individual and team events. In the women's épée individual event, she was defeated by Leonora Mackinnon of Canada in the first round. The Romanian team won gold in the women's épée team event. Pop was the flag bearer for Romania during the closing ceremony.
