= Emese Szász-Kovács =

Hungarian fencer

Emese Szász
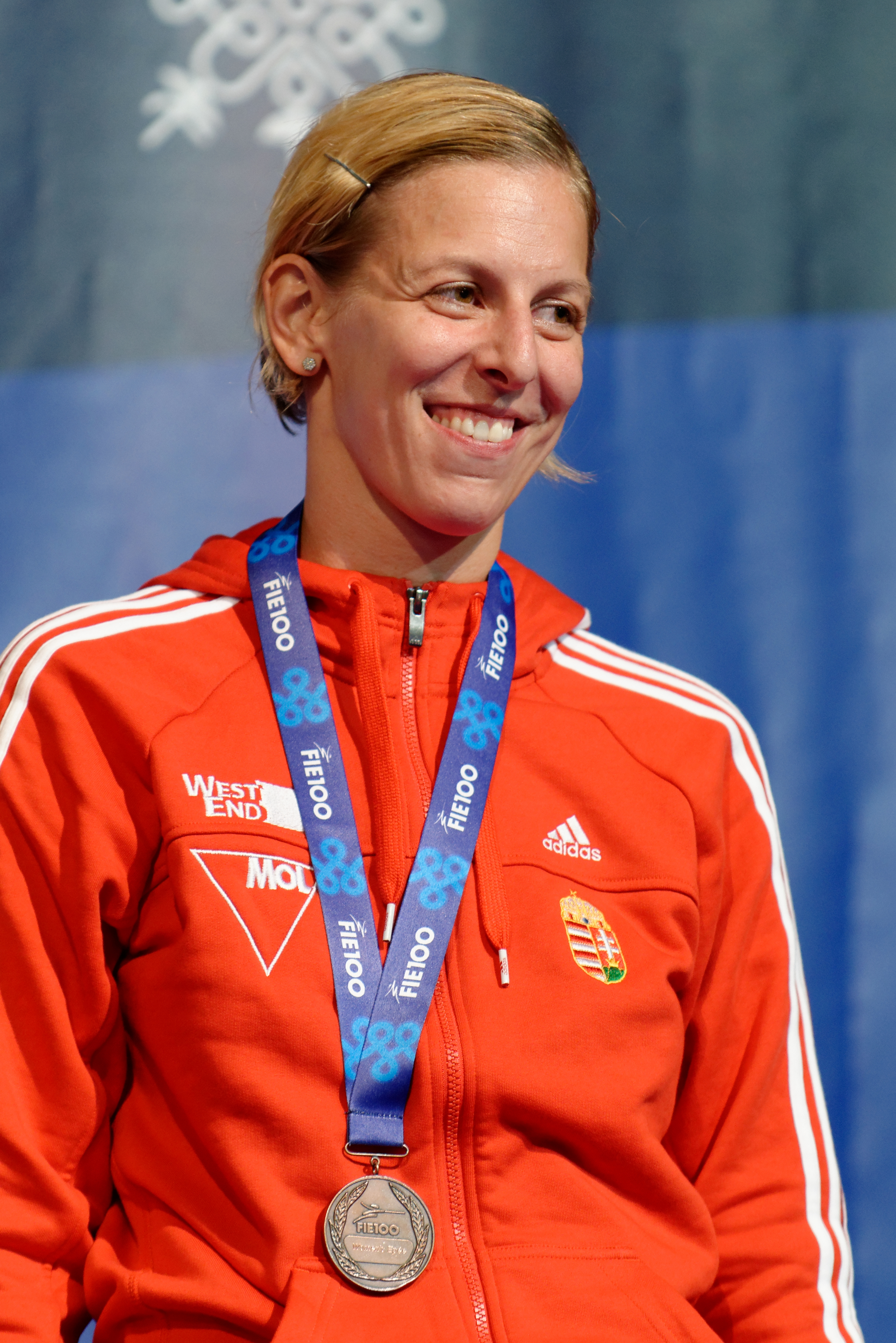
- At the 2013 World Fencing Championships

Personal information
- Full name: Emese Judit Szász
- Born: 7 September 1982 (age 44) Budapest, Hungary
- Height: 1.76 m (5 ft 9 1/2 in)
- Weight: 69 kg (152 lb)

Fencing career
- Sport: Fencing
- Country: Hungary
- Weapon: épée
- Hand: left-handed
- Club: Vasas SC (2009- ) Bp. Honvéd ( -2009)
- Head coach: Győző Kulcsár
- FIE ranking: current ranking
Medal record
Women's épée
Representing Hungary
Olympic Games
Gold medal – first place	2016 Rio de Janeiro	Individual
World Championships
Silver medal – second place	2005 Leipzig	Team
Silver medal – second place	2010 Paris	Individual
Bronze medal – third place	2006 Turin	Individual
Bronze medal – third place	2013 Budapest	Individual
European Championships
Bronze medal – third place	2013 Zagreb	Individual
Bronze medal – third place	2013 Zagreb	Team
Bronze medal – third place	2017 Tbilisi	Individual

Emese Szász (pronounced [ˈɛmɛʃɛ ˈsaːs]; born 7 September 1982) is a Hungarian left-handed épée fencer, three-time Olympian, and 2016 individual Olympic champion.

== Career ==
Szász's first sport was swimming, but she grew tired of it. She did not think she would succeed in a ball game, being left-handed, so she took on fencing. Her first coaches were György Felletár and Béla Kopetka. She joined the junior national Hungarian team, with which she won a gold medal at the 1998 Junior World Championships in Valencia and a silver medal at the 1999 edition in Keszthely.

She began the 2013–14 season by winning gold in the 2013 World Combat Games in Saint-Petersburg, defeating in the final world champion Julia Beljajeva.

== Medal Record ==
=== Olympic Games ===
Year	Location	Event	Position
2016	Rio de Janeiro, Brazil	Individual Women's Épée	1st

=== World Championship ===
Year	Location	Event	Position
2005	Leipzig, Germany	Team Women's Épée	2nd
2006	Turin, Italy	Individual Women's Épée	3rd
2010	Paris, France	Individual Women's Épée	2nd
2013	Budapest, Hungary	Individual Women's Épée	3rd

=== European Championship ===
Year	Location	Event	Position
2007	Ghent, Belgium	Team Women's Épée	2nd
2013	Zagreb, Croatia	Individual Women's Épée	3rd
2013	Zagreb, Croatia	Team Women's Épée	3rd
2015	Montreux, Switzerland	Individual Women's Épée	3rd
2016	Toruń, Poland	Individual Women's Épée	3rd
2017	(Georgia (country)) Tbilisi, Georgia	Individual Women's Épée	3rd

=== Grand Prix ===
Date	Location	Event	Position
05/12/2006	Barcelona, Spain	Individual Women's Épée	3rd
06/16/2006	Havana, Cuba	Individual Women's Épée	1st
01/19/2007	Budapest, Hungary	Individual Women's Épée	2nd
02/09/2007	Rome, Italy	Individual Women's Épée	2nd
01/18/2008	Budapest, Hungary	Individual Women's Épée	1st
01/16/2009	Budapest, Hungary	Individual Women's Épée	3rd
02/06/2009	Rome, Italy	Individual Women's Épée	1st
01/23/2010	Doha, Qatar	Individual Women's Épée	2nd
02/19/2010	Saint-Maur-des-Fossés, France	Individual Women's Épée	3rd
05/28/2010	Montreal, Canada	Individual Women's Épée	2nd
06/11/2011	Nanjing, China	Individual Women's Épée	3rd
02/25/2012	Budapest, Hungary	Individual Women's Épée	3rd
05/23/2013	Havana, Cuba	Individual Women's Épée	2nd
05/22/2014	Havana, Cuba	Individual Women's Épée	3rd
12/06/2014	Doha, Qatar	Individual Women's Épée	3rd
05/26/2017	Bogotá, Colombia	Individual Women's Épée	1st
05/25/2018	Cali, Colombia	Individual Women's Épée	1st

=== World Cup ===
Date	Location	Event	Position
05/01/2004	Mödling, Austria	Individual Women's Épée	2nd
05/14/2004	Legnano, Italy	Individual Women's Épée	2nd
03/03/2007	Tauberbischofsheim, Germany	Individual Women's Épée	1st
05/26/2007	Sydney, Australia	Individual Women's Épée	1st
01/26/2008	Prague, Czech Republic	Individual Women's Épée	1st
02/16/2008	Barcelona, Spain	Individual Women's Épée	2nd
03/07/2009	Tauberbischofsheim, Germany	Individual Women's Épée	1st
03/27/2010	Luxembourg	Individual Women's Épée	1st
06/24/2011	Sydney, Australia	Individual Women's Épée	3rd
03/01/2013	Saint-Maur-des-Fossés, France	Individual Women's Épée	2nd
02/07/2014	Leipzig, Germany	Individual Women's Épée	3rd
03/07/2014	Barcelona, Spain	Individual Women's Épée	1st
05/16/2014	Rio de Janeiro, Brazil	Individual Women's Épée	2nd
11/14/2014	Xuzhou, China	Individual Women's Épée	1st
10/24/2014	Legnano, Italy	Individual Women's Épée	3rd
10/23/2015	Legnano, Italy	Individual Women's Épée	3rd
01/20/2017	Barcelona, Spain	Individual Women's Épée	3rd
10/20/2017	Tallinn, Estonia	Individual Women's Épée	3rd

== Awards ==
- Hungarian Fencer of the Year (5): 2010, 2013, 2014, 2015, 2016
- Honorary Citizen of Zugló (2016)

Orders and special awards

- Order of Merit of Hungary – Officer's Cross (2016)
