= Tiffany Géroudet =

Swiss fencer

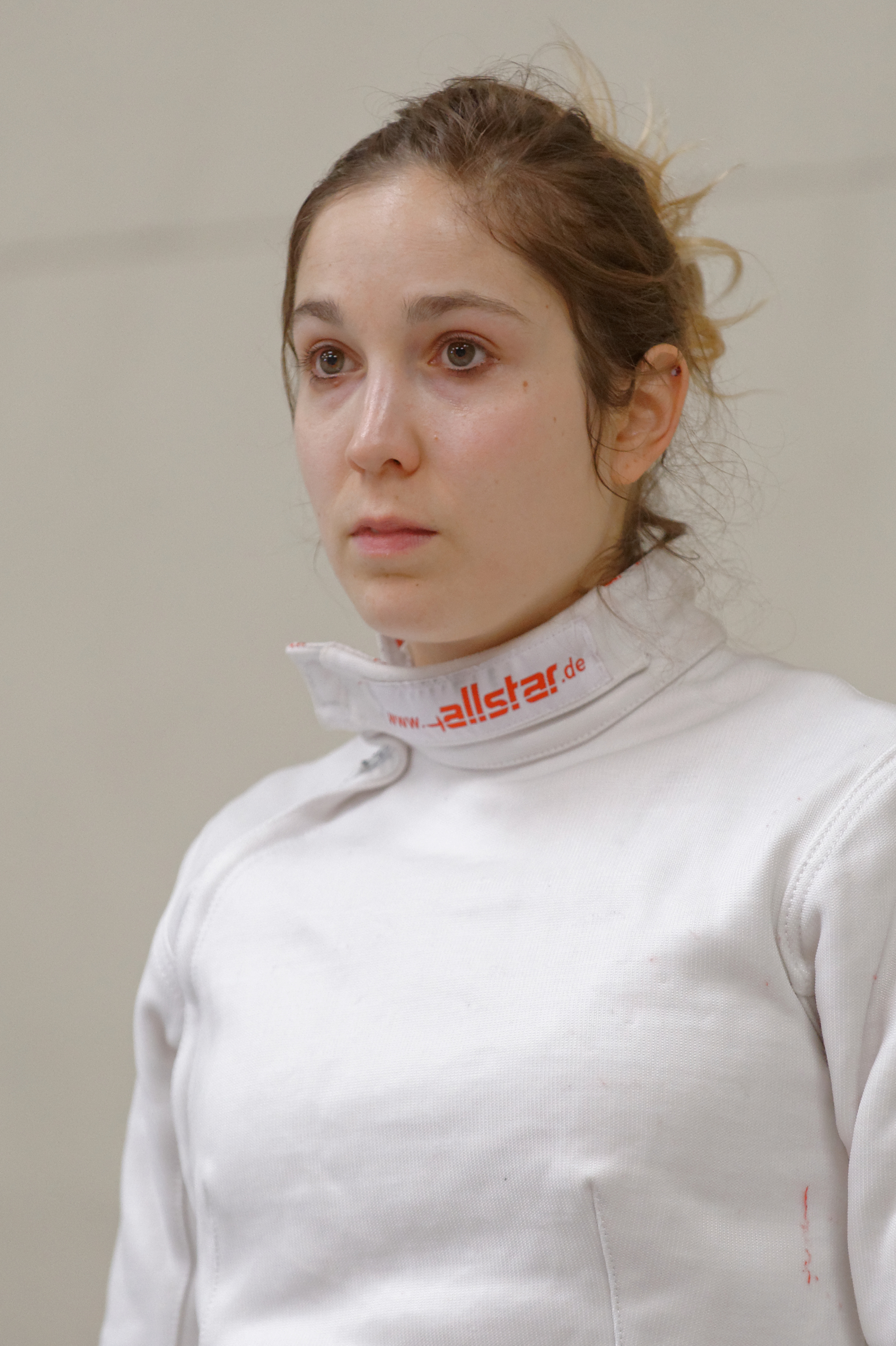

Personal information
- Born: 3 September 1986 (age 40) Sion, Valais, Switzerland
- Height: 1.7 m (5 ft 7 in)
- Weight: 63 kg (139 lb; 9.9 st)

Fencing career
- Sport: Fencing
- Country: Switzerland
- Weapon: épée
- Hand: left-handed
- Club: Société d'escrime de Sion
- FIE ranking: current ranking
Medal record
European Championships
Gold medal – first place	2011 Sheffield	Épée
Bronze medal – third place	2009 Plovdiv	Team épée

Tiffany Géroudet (born 3 September 1986 in Sion, Valais) is a Swiss épée fencer, European champion in 2011. She is currently 9th in FIE rankings.

== Biography ==
Géroudet was born in Sion, Switzerland, in a family of three children. She practiced ski, swimming, and mountain hiking with her siblings before taking on fencing with her brother.

She won her first major medal, a gold, at the 2006 Junior World Championships in Taebaek City. In the same year, she won her first national championship, which she would win seven consecutive seasons. She was a member of the Switzerland women's épée team that earned a bronze medal in the 2009 European Championships in Plovdiv.

In 2011, she won the European Championships in Sheffield, beating the favourites Laura Flessel, Nathalie Moellhausen, and Britta Heidemann. She became the first and as of 2013 only Swiss female European fencing champion. She qualified for the 2012 Summer Olympics in London, but was beaten in the table of 16 by eventual bronze medal winner Sun Yujie.

In the 2013–14 seasonat Dona she won her first World Cup gold medal.
