= Women's épée at the 2018 World Fencing Championships =

- Venue: Wuxi Sports Center Indoor Stadium
- Location: Wuxi, China
- Dates: 19 July (qualification); 22 July
- Competitors: 121 from 47 nations

Medalists
gold medal	Mara Navarria	Italy
silver medal	Ana Maria Brânză	Romania
bronze medal	Laura Staehli	Switzerland
bronze medal	Courtney Hurley	United States

The Women's épée event of the 2018 World Fencing Championships was held on 22 July 2018. The qualification was held on 19 July 2018.

== Draw ==
=== Finals ===
Semifinals
(Italy) Mara Navarria	15
(Switzerland) Laura Staehli	8
(United States) Courtney Hurley	13
(Romania) Ana Maria Brânză	14

Final
(Italy) Mara Navarria	13
(Romania) Ana Maria Brânză	9

=== Top half ===
==== Section 1 ====
Round of 64
(Italy) Mara Navarria	15
(Hungary) Anna Kun	9
(France) Auriane Mallo	15
(Luxembourg) Lis Rottler-Fautsch	10
(United States) Katharine Holmes	14
(Japan) Ayaka Shimookawa	9
(Switzerland) Angela Krieger	13
(South Korea) Lee Hye-in	14
(Russia) Violetta Kolobova	15
(Brazil) Nathalie Moellhausen	11
(Romania) Amalia Tătăran	6
(Estonia) Katrina Lehis	15
(Poland) Barbara Rutz	15
(Romania) Raluca Sbarcia	4
(China) Lin Sheng	12
(South Korea) Kang Young-mi	15

Round of 32
(Italy) Mara Navarria	15
(France) Auriane Mallo	11
(United States) Katharine Holmes	15
(South Korea) Lee Hye-in	8
(Russia) Violetta Kolobova	6
(Estonia) Katrina Lehis	15
(Poland) Barbara Rutz	15
(South Korea) Kang Young-mi	13

Round of 16
(Italy) Mara Navarria	15
(United States) Katharine Holmes	9
(Estonia) Katrina Lehis	15
(Poland) Barbara Rutz	13

Quarterfinals
(Italy) Mara Navarria	15
(Estonia) Katrina Lehis	9

==== Section 2 ====
Round of 64
(China) Sun Yiwen	12
(Germany) Monika Sozanska	6
(Ukraine) Kseniya Pantelyeyeva	13
(Switzerland) Laura Staehli	15
(Ukraine) Anfisa Pochkalova	15
(Austria) Paula Schmidl	14
(Uzbekistan) Malika Khakimova	15
(Hong Kong) Vivian Kong	12
(United States) Kelley Hurley	15
(Germany) Beate Christmann	8
(Romania) Maria Udrea	15
(Russia) Aizanat Murtazaeva	8
(France) Marie-Florence Candassamy	15
(Estonia) Kristina Kuusk	9
(Sweden) Asa Linde	11
(Hungary) Emese Szász-Kovács	15

Round of 32
(China) Sun Yiwen	13
(Switzerland) Laura Staehli	15
(Ukraine) Anfisa Pochkalova	15
(Uzbekistan) Malika Khakimova	14
(United States) Kelley Hurley	12
(Romania) Maria Udrea	13
(France) Marie-Florence Candassamy	10
(Hungary) Emese Szász-Kovács	15

Round of 16
(Switzerland) Laura Staehli	15
(Ukraine) Anfisa Pochkalova	14
(Romania) Maria Udrea	10
(Hungary) Emese Szász-Kovács	11

Quarterfinals
(Switzerland) Laura Staehli	14
(Hungary) Emese Szász-Kovács	13

=== Bottom half ===
==== Section 3 ====
Round of 64
(Russia) Tatyana Gudkova	11
(Poland) Aleksandra Zamachowska	15
(United States) Courtney Hurley	15
(Spain) Dora Kiskapusi	12
(Russia) Tatyana Andryushina	15
(Sweden) Emelie Mumm	8
(Netherlands) Kelly Boone	12
(China) Zhu Mingye	15
(South Korea) Choi In-jeong	15
(Germany) Alexandra Ehler	14
(Israel) Dar Hecht	15
(China) Hou Guangjuan	13
(Switzerland) Pauline Brunner	12
(South Korea) Shin A-lam	11
(France) Coraline Vitalis	15
(Poland) Ewa Nelip	14

Round of 32
(Poland) Aleksandra Zamachowska	14
(United States) Courtney Hurley	15
(Russia) Tatyana Andryushina	15
(China) Zhu Mingye	13
(South Korea) Choi In-jeong	15
(Israel) Dar Hecht	10
(Switzerland) Pauline Brunner	12
(France) Coraline Vitalis	15

Round of 16
(United States) Courtney Hurley	9
(Russia) Tatyana Andryushina	8
(South Korea) Choi In-jeong	14
(France) Coraline Vitalis	15

Quarterfinals
(United States) Courtney Hurley	15
(France) Coraline Vitalis	10

==== Section 4 ====
Round of 64
(Estonia) Julia Beljajeva	7
(Estonia) Irina Embrich	15
(Poland) Renata Knapik-Miazga	7
(Ukraine) Dzhoan Bezhura	8
(Italy) Rossella Fiamingo	15
(Spain) Sara Fernández Calleja	6
(Japan) Kanna Oishi	9
(Romania) Ana Maria Brânză	15
(Italy) Giulia Rizzi	15
(Italy) Alberta Santuccio	11
(Japan) Shiori Komata	12
(France) Laurence Épée	15
(Lithuania) Olivija Mašalo	5
(Hungary) Dorina Budai	15
(Egypt) Nardin Ehab	8
(Ukraine) Olena Kryvytska	15

Round of 32
(Estonia) Irina Embrich	7
(Ukraine) Dzhoan Bezhura	10
(Italy) Rossella Fiamingo	8
(Romania) Ana Maria Brânză	15
(Italy) Giulia Rizzi	14
(France) Laurence Épée	15
(Lithuania) Olivija Mašalo	6
(Ukraine) Olena Kryvytska	15

Round of 16
(Ukraine) Dzhoan Bezhura	9
(Romania) Ana Maria Brânză	15
(France) Laurence Épée	10
(Ukraine) Olena Kryvytska	15

Quarterfinals
(Romania) Ana Maria Brânză	15
(Ukraine) Olena Kryvytska	11
