= Fencing at the 2017 Summer Universiade – Women's individual épée =

Women's individual épée at the XXIX Summer Universiade
- Venues: Taipei Nangang Exhibition Center
- Dates: 20 August 2017
- Competitors: 89 from 33 nations

Medalists
1st place, gold medalist(s)		Aleksandra Zamachowska	Poland
2nd place, silver medalist(s)		Kamila Pytka	Poland
3rd place, bronze medalist(s)		Roberta Marzani	Italy
3rd place, bronze medalist(s)		Kseniya Pantelyeyeva	Ukraine

The women's individual épée fencing event at the 2017 Summer Universiade was held 20 August at the Taipei Nangang Exhibition Center in Taipei, Taiwan.

== Pool Results ==
Qualified for Ranking Round

=== Pool 1 ===
#	Seed	Athlete	1	2	3	4	5	6	7	V#	M#	Ind.	TG	TR	Diff.	RP	RT
1	1	Dzhoan Feybi Bezhura (UKR)		D_{3}	D_{1}	D_{3}	V	V	V	3	6	0.500	22	20	2	4	45
2	26	Martyna Swatowska (POL)	V		D_{3}	V_{4}	V	V	V	5	6	0.833	27	16	11	1	13
3	27	Marie-Florence Candassamy (FRA)	V	V		D_{1}	V_{4}	V	V	5	6	0.833	25	15	10	2	18
4	52	Honami Suzuki (JPN)	V	D_{3}	V		V	D_{4}	V	4	6	0.667	27	18	9	3	25
5	53	Irina Okhotnikova (RUS)	D_{4}	D_{3}	D_{2}	D_{4}		V	V	2	6	0.333	23	22	1	5	58
6	78	Aswathi Raj Pothu Kuttiyil (IND)	D_{1}	D_{1}	D_{3}	V	D_{2}		V	2	6	0.333	17	27	–10	6	68
7	79	Indira Paudel (NEP)	D_{0}	D_{1}	D_{1}	D_{1}	D_{1}	D_{3}		0	6	0.000	7	30	–23	7	89

=== Pool 2 ===
#	Seed	Athlete	1	2	3	4	5	6	7	V#	M#	Ind.	TG	TR	Diff.	RP	RT
1	2	Katharine Holmes (USA)		V	V	D_{1}	V	V	V	5	6	0.833	26	19	7	1	20
2	25	Anna Salminen (FIN)	D_{1}		V	D_{4}	D_{4}	V	V	3	6	0.500	24	24	0	5	49
3	28	Yuliya Svystil (UKR)	D_{4}	D_{3}		V	D_{4}	V	D_{1}	2	6	0.333	22	27	–5	6	62
4	51	Laura Szabo (HUN)	V_{4}	V	D_{4}		D_{3}	V	D_{3}	3	6	0.500	24	21	3	4	41
5	54	Ayumu Saito (JPN)	D_{4}	V	V	V		V	D_{0}	4	6	0.667	24	22	2	3	34
6	76	Roos Kroese (NED)	D_{2}	D_{3}	D_{3}	D_{2}	D_{1}		D_{1}	0	6	0.000	12	30	–18	7	83
7	81	Lu Minmin (CHN)	D_{4}	D_{3}	V	V_{4}	V	V		4	6	0.667	26	15	11	2	22

=== Pool 3 ===
#	Seed	Athlete	1	2	3	4	5	6	7	V#	M#	Ind.	TG	TR	Diff.	RP	RT
1	3	Anna Van Brummen (USA)		D_{4}	V	V	V	D_{4}	V	4	6	0.667	28	19	9	2	24
2	24	Laura Stähli (SUI)	V		D_{2}	V	D_{4}	D_{4}	V	3	6	0.500	25	23	2	5	42
3	29	Alexandra Louis Marie (FRA)	D_{2}	V		V	D_{3}	V	V	4	6	0.667	25	21	4	4	32
4	50	Carmel Tulen (NED)	D_{3}	D_{1}	D_{3}		D_{1}	D_{3}	V	1	6	0.167	16	28	–12	6	77
5	56	Michaela Kock (FIN)	D_{2}	V	V	V		V	V	5	6	0.833	27	17	10	1	15
6	77	Yu Dan-woo (KOR)	V	V	D_{4}	V_{4}	D_{3}		V	4	6	0.667	26	22	4	3	31
7	82	Giselle Vicatos (RSA)	D_{2}	D_{3}	D_{2}	D_{4}	D_{1}	D_{1}		0	6	0.000	13	30	–17	7	80

=== Pool 4 ===
#	Seed	Athlete	1	2	3	4	5	6	7	V#	M#	Ind.	TG	TR	Diff.	RP	RT
1	4	Song Se-ra (KOR)		V_{3}	V	V	D_{4}	V	V	5	6	0.833	27	13	14	2	11
2	23	Roberta Marzani (ITA)	D_{2}		V	V	V	V	V	5	6	0.833	27	11	16	1	9
3	30	Debbie Ho Tik Lam (HKG)	D_{1}	D_{3}		D_{4}	V	V	D_{2}	2	6	0.333	20	26	–6	4	64
4	49	Naira Ferreira (BRA)	D_{0}	D_{2}	V		V	D_{2}	D_{1}	2	6	0.333	15	26	–11	6	70
5	55	Ingrid Ursulet (FRA)	V	D_{1}	D_{2}	D_{2}		V	D_{1}	2	6	0.333	16	25	–9	5	66
6	75	Cheryl De Jong (NED)	D_{2}	D_{2}	D_{4}	V	D_{1}		D_{4}	1	6	0.167	18	27	–9	7	73
7	80	Barbara VanBenthuysen (USA)	D_{3}	D_{0}	V	V	V	V		4	6	0.667	23	18	5	3	30

=== Pool 5 ===
#	Seed	Athlete	1	2	3	4	5	6	7	V#	M#	Ind.	TG	TR	Diff.	RP	RT
1	5	Laurence Épée (FRA)		V	V_{3}	V	V	V	V	6	6	1.000	28	10	18	1	2
2	22	Dorina Budai (HUN)	D_{2}		D_{3}	V	V	V	V	4	6	0.667	25	17	8	3	26
3	31	Coco Lin Yik Hei (HKG)	D_{2}	V		V_{3}	V	V	V	5	6	0.833	25	14	11	2	14
4	48	Vera Maia Devi Kanevski (ISR)	D_{1}	D_{2}	D_{2}		V	D_{4}	V	2	6	0.333	19	19	0	4	60
5	57	Marilyne Plante (CAN)	D_{3}	D_{1}	D_{2}	D_{0}		V	V	2	6	0.333	16	25	–9	5	66
6	74	Madina Azizova (EST)	D_{0}	D_{4}	D_{2}	V	D_{4}		D_{4}	1	6	0.167	19	29	–10	6	74
7	83	Fiona Ip (SGP)	D_{2}	D_{0}	D_{2}	D_{1}	D_{1}	V		1	6	0.167	11	29	–18	7	78

=== Pool 6 ===
#	Seed	Athlete	1	2	3	4	5	6	7	V#	M#	Ind.	TG	TR	Diff.	RP	RT
1	6	Anfisa Pochkalova (UKR)		D_{3}	D_{3}	D_{4}	V	V	V	3	6	0.500	25	23	2	3	42
2	21	Kata Mihaly (HUN)	V		D_{2}	D_{2}	D_{4}	V	V	3	6	0.500	23	22	1	5	48
3	32	Yulia Lichagina (RUS)	V	V		D_{4}	V	V	V	5	6	0.833	29	16	13	2	12
4	47	Choi Hyo-joo (KOR)	V	V	V		V	V	V	6	6	1.000	30	15	15	1	3
5	58	Cheng Ya-fang (TPE)	D_{4}	V	D_{3}	D_{3}		V	V	3	6	0.500	25	24	1	4	47
6	73	Andrea Campos Esquivel (CRC)	D_{2}	D_{3}	D_{2}	D_{2}	D_{3}		V	1	6	0.167	17	28	–11	6	75
7	84	Amarzaya Batsaikhan (MGL)	D_{2}	D_{1}	D_{1}	D_{0}	D_{2}	D_{3}		0	6	0.000	9	30	–21	7	86

=== Pool 7 ===
#	Seed	Athlete	1	2	3	4	5	6	7	V#	M#	Ind.	TG	TR	Diff.	RP	RT
1	7	Violetta Khrapina (RUS)		D_{3}	V	D_{2}	D_{0}	V	V	3	6	0.500	20	24	–4	5	53
2	20	Alice Clerici (ITA)	V		V	V	V	D_{3}	V	5	6	0.833	28	12	16	1	8
3	34	Lin Hui-min (TPE)	D_{2}	D_{0}		D_{3}	V	D_{4}	V	2	6	0.333	19	24	–5	6	63
4	46	Kim Myoung-sun (KOR)	V	D_{4}	V		V_{3}	V	V	5	6	0.833	27	17	10	2	15
5	59	Anu Hark (EST)	V	D_{0}	D_{4}	D_{1}		V	V	3	6	0.500	20	20	0	4	52
6	72	Enikő Siklósi (HUN)	D_{4}	V_{4}	V	D_{3}	D_{4}		V_{4}	3	6	0.500	24	24	0	3	49
7	85	Line Baun Grubak (DEN)	D_{3}	D_{1}	D_{0}	D_{3}	D_{3}	D_{2}		0	6	0.000	12	29	–17	7	81

=== Pool 8 ===
#	Seed	Athlete	1	2	3	4	5	6	7	V#	M#	Ind.	TG	TR	Diff.	RP	RT
1	8	Kseniya Pantelyeyeva (UKR)		V	D_{3}	V	V	V	V	5	6	0.833	28	14	14	2	10
2	19	Amalia Tătăran (ROU)	D_{4}		V	V	V	V	V	5	6	0.833	29	13	16	1	7
3	33	Nicol Foietta (ITA)	V	D_{3}		V	V_{4}	V	V	5	6	0.833	27	18	9	3	19
4	45	Jas Seerat Singh Singh (IND)	D_{1}	D_{2}	D_{4}		D_{0}	V	D_{4}	1	6	0.167	16	27	–11	6	76
5	60	Chiu Chih-ting (TPE)	D_{1}	D_{1}	D_{3}	V		V	V	3	6	0.500	20	18	2	4	46
6	71	Celina Zander (SWE)	D_{1}	D_{2}	D_{1}	D_{2}	D_{2}		D_{2}	0	6	0.000	10	30	–20	7	84
7	87	Lilit Evoyan (ARM)	D_{2}	D_{0}	D_{2}	V	D_{2}	V		2	6	0.333	16	26	–10	5	69

=== Pool 9 ===
#	Seed	Athlete	1	2	3	4	5	6	7	V#	M#	Ind.	TG	TR	Diff.	RP	RT
1	9	Kamila Pytka (POL)		D_{0}	D_{3}	V	V	V_{4}	V	4	6	0.667	22	22	0	3	35
2	18	Asa Linde (SWE)	V		V	V	V	V	V	6	6	1.000	30	15	15	1	3
3	35	Wang Yufen (CHN)	V_{4}	D_{3}		V	V	V	V	5	6	0.833	27	17	10	2	15
4	44	Kim Jasmin Buech (SUI)	D_{3}	D_{4}	D_{4}		V	V	V	3	6	0.500	26	23	3	4	40
5	61	Ellen Obster (NED)	D_{3}	D_{3}	D_{0}	D_{1}		D_{2}	D_{1}	0	6	0.000	10	30	–20	7	84
6	70	Eri Shiraishi (JPN)	D_{3}	D_{4}	D_{2}	D_{4}	V		V	2	6	0.333	23	25	–2	5	61
7	86	Jyotika Dutta (IND)	D_{4}	D_{1}	D_{3}	D_{3}	V	D_{4}		1	6	0.167	20	26	–6	6	72

=== Pool 10 ===
#	Seed	Athlete	1	2	3	4	5	6	7	V#	M#	Ind.	TG	TR	Diff.	RP	RT
1	10	Pauline Brunner (SUI)		D_{3}	V	D_{3}	V	V	V	4	6	0.667	26	15	11	2	22
2	17	Barbara Rutz (POL)	V		V	V	V	V	V	6	6	1.000	30	15	15	1	3
3	38	Hsu Jo-ting (TPE)	D_{2}	D_{3}		V	V	V	D_{3}	3	6	0.500	23	23	0	4	51
4	43	Anna Hornischer (GER)	V_{4}	D_{4}	D_{2}		V	V	V	4	6	0.667	25	20	5	3	28
5	62	Gaia-Marianna Salm (EST)	D_{3}	D_{3}	D_{4}	D_{4}		V	V	2	6	0.333	24	24	0	5	59
6	69	Alanah Maclaurin (AUS)	D_{0}	D_{1}	D_{2}	D_{0}	D_{2}		D_{3}	0	6	0.000	8	30	–22	7	88
7	88	Gerelmaa Baatarchuluun (MGL)	D_{1}	D_{1}	V	D_{3}	D_{2}	V		2	6	0.333	17	26	–9	6	65

=== Pool 11 ===
#	Seed	Athlete	1	2	3	4	5	6	7	V#	M#	Ind.	TG	TR	Diff.	RP	RT
1	11	Nadine Stahlberg (GER)		D_{2}	V	V	V	D_{3}	V	4	6	0.667	25	22	3	3	33
2	16	Chu Ka Mong (HKG)	V		D_{4}	D_{3}	D_{3}	V	V	3	6	0.500	25	23	2	5	42
3	36	Aleksandra Zamachowska (POL)	D_{2}	V		V	D_{3}	V	V	4	6	0.667	25	20	5	2	28
4	42	Catherine Nixon (USA)	D_{3}	V	D_{2}		D_{3}	V	V	3	6	0.500	23	19	4	4	39
5	63	Sofia Tauriainen (FIN)	D_{4}	V	V	V		D_{3}	V	4	6	0.667	27	22	5	1	27
6	68	Madeleine Andersen (AUS)	V	D_{3}	D_{0}	D_{0}	V		V_{4}	3	6	0.500	17	24	–7	6	54
7	89	Geng Jiali (CHN)	D_{3}	D_{3}	D_{4}	D_{1}	D_{3}	D_{3}		0	6	0.000	17	29	–12	7	79

=== Pool 12 ===
#	Seed	Athlete	1	2	3	4	5	6	V#	M#	Ind.	TG	TR	Diff.	RP	RT
1	12	Marta Ferrari (ITA)		V	V	V	V	V	5	5	1.000	25	6	19	1	1
2	15	Nelli Paju (EST)	D_{2}		D_{4}	D_{2}	V	D_{4}	1	5	0.200	17	20	–3	5	71
3	37	Noemi Moeschlin (SUI)	D_{0}	V		V	V	V	4	5	0.800	20	16	4	2	21
4	41	Vanessa Riedmüller (GER)	D_{3}	V	D_{3}		V	D_{4}	2	5	0.400	20	18	2	4	55
5	64	Tsolmon Batkhuu (MGL)	D_{1}	D_{0}	D_{2}	D_{1}		D_{0}	0	5	0.000	4	25	–21	6	87
6	67	Larisa Dordevic (SWE)	D_{0}	V	D_{2}	V	V		3	5	0.600	17	18	–1	3	38

=== Pool 13 ===
#	Seed	Athlete	1	2	3	4	5	6	V#	M#	Ind.	TG	TR	Diff.	RP	RT
1	13	Alena Komarova (RUS)		D_{2}	V	D_{4}	V	V	3	5	0.600	21	14	7	2	36
2	14	Ulyana Balaganskaya (KAZ)	V		V	D_{2}	V	D_{3}	3	5	0.600	20	16	4	3	37
3	39	Kabita Devi (IND)	D_{2}	D_{2}		D_{3}	V	V	2	5	0.400	17	21	–4	4	56
4	40	Paula Schmidl (AUT)	V	V	V		V	V	5	5	1.000	25	10	15	1	6
5	65	Anudari Otgonmunkh (MGL)	D_{1}	D_{2}	D_{3}	D_{0}		D_{2}	0	5	0.000	8	25	–17	6	82
6	66	Ebba Karlsson (SWE)	D_{1}	V	D_{3}	D_{1}	V		2	5	0.400	15	20	–5	5	57

== Ranking Round ==
=== Section 1 ===
Round of 128
88	Gerelmaa Baatarchuluun (MGL)	7
30	Debbie Ho Tik Lam (HKG)	15

Round of 64
12	Marta Ferrari (ITA)	15
30	Debbie Ho Tik Lam (HKG)	5
11	Nadine Stahlberg (GER)	15
29	Alexandra Louis Marie (FRA)	13
56	Michaela Kock (FIN)	14
21	Kata Mihaly (HUN)	15
25	Anna Salminen (FIN)	12
46	Kim Myoung-sun (KOR)	15

Round of 32
12	Marta Ferrari (ITA)	12
11	Nadine Stahlberg (GER)	15
21	Kata Mihaly (HUN)	11
46	Kim Myoung-sun (KOR)	15

Round of 16
11	Nadine Stahlberg (GER)	9
46	Kim Myoung-sun (KOR)	15

=== Section 2 ===
Round of 128

Round of 64
23	Roberta Marzani (ITA)	15
39	Kabita Devi (IND)	4
51	Laura Szabo (HUN)	7
3	Anna Van Brummen (USA)	15
52	Honami Suzuki (JPN)	13
44	Kim Jasmin Buech (SUI)	15
66	Ebba Karlsson (SWE)	8
20	Alice Clerici (ITA)	15

Round of 32
23	Roberta Marzani (ITA)	15
3	Anna Van Brummen (USA)	14
44	Kim Jasmin Buech (SUI)	15
20	Alice Clerici (ITA)	12

Round of 16
23	Roberta Marzani (ITA)	15
44	Kim Jasmin Buech (SUI)	8

=== Section 3 ===
Round of 128

Round of 64
18	Asa Linde (SWE)	15
48	Vera Maia Devi Kanevski (ISR)	10
14	Ulyana Balaganskaya (KAZ)	15
43	Anna Hornischer (GER)	7
37	Noemi Moeschlin (SUI)	11
24	Laura Stähli (SUI)	15
7	Violetta Khrapina (RUS)	5
32	Yulia Lichagina (RUS)	3

Round of 32
18	Asa Linde (SWE)	15
14	Ulyana Balaganskaya (KAZ)	12
24	Laura Stähli (SUI)	15
7	Violetta Khrapina (RUS)	14

Round of 16
18	Asa Linde (SWE)	15
24	Laura Stähli (SUI)	10

=== Section 4 ===
Round of 128

Round of 64
26	Martyna Swatowska (POL)	15
59	Anu Hark (EST)	11
1	Dzhoan Feybi Bezhura (UKR)	15
2	Katharine Holmes (USA)	13
36	Aleksandra Zamachowska (POL)	15
13	Alena Komarova (RUS)	11
70	Eri Shiraishi (JPN)	15
17	Barbara Rutz (POL)	11

Round of 32
26	Martyna Swatowska (POL)	15
1	Dzhoan Feybi Bezhura (UKR)	14
36	Aleksandra Zamachowska (POL)	15
70	Eri Shiraishi (JPN)	11

Round of 16
26	Martyna Swatowska (POL)	7
36	Aleksandra Zamachowska (POL)	15

=== Section 5 ===
Round of 128
57	Marilyne Plante (CAN)	9
28	Yuliya Svystil (UKR)	15

Round of 64
47	Choi Hyo-joo (KOR)	15
28	Yuliya Svystil (UKR)	13
9	Kamila Pytka (POL)	15
80	Barbara VanBenthuysen (USA)	10
33	Nicol Foietta (ITA)	13
60	Chiu Chih-ting (TPE)	12
38	Hsu Jo-ting (TPE)	8
31	Coco Lin Yik Hei (HKG)	9

Round of 32
47	Choi Hyo-joo (KOR)	8
9	Kamila Pytka (POL)	15
33	Nicol Foietta (ITA)	11
31	Coco Lin Yik Hei (HKG)	8

Round of 16
9	Kamila Pytka (POL)	9
33	Nicol Foietta (ITA)	7

=== Section 6 ===
Round of 128

Round of 64
4	Song Se-ra (KOR)	15
68	Madeleine Andersen (AUS)	4
16	Chu Ka Mong (HKG)	11
10	Pauline Brunner (SUI)	15
63	Sofia Tauriainen (FIN)	15
67	Larisa Dordevic (SWE)	5
62	Gaia-Marianna Salm (EST)	7
40	Paula Schmidl (AUT)	9

Round of 32
4	Song Se-ra (KOR)	15
10	Pauline Brunner (SUI)	9
63	Sofia Tauriainen (FIN)	7
40	Paula Schmidl (AUT)	15

Round of 16
4	Song Se-ra (KOR)	15
40	Paula Schmidl (AUT)	12

=== Section 7 ===
Round of 128

Round of 64
19	Amalia Tătăran (ROU)	14
53	Irina Okhotnikova (RUS)	15
42	Catherine Nixon (USA)	9
22	Dorina Budai (HUN)	8
81	Lu Minmin (CHN)	13
6	Anfisa Pochkalova (UKR)	15
41	Vanessa Riedmüller (GER)	10
8	Kseniya Pantelyeyeva (UKR)	15

Round of 32
53	Irina Okhotnikova (RUS)	12
42	Catherine Nixon (USA)	15
6	Anfisa Pochkalova (UKR)	11
8	Kseniya Pantelyeyeva (UKR)	15

Round of 16
42	Catherine Nixon (USA)	9
8	Kseniya Pantelyeyeva (UKR)	15

=== Section 8 ===
Round of 128
34	Lin Hui-min (TPE)	15
55	Ingrid Ursulet (FRA)	12

Round of 64
35	Wang Yufen (CHN)	15
72	Enikő Siklósi (HUN)	13
58	Cheng Ya-fang (TPE)	8
27	Marie-Florence Candassamy (FRA)	15
77	Yu Dan-woo (KOR)	15
54	Ayumu Saito (JPN)	8
34	Lin Hui-min (TPE)	14
5	Laurence Épée (FRA)	15

Round of 32
35	Wang Yufen (CHN)	8
27	Marie-Florence Candassamy (FRA)	15
77	Yu Dan-woo (KOR)	15
5	Laurence Épée (FRA)	13

Round of 16
27	Marie-Florence Candassamy (FRA)	5
77	Yu Dan-woo (KOR)	15

=== Quarterfinals ===
Quarterfinals
46	Kim Myoung-sun (KOR)	8
23	Roberta Marzani (ITA)	15
18	Asa Linde (SWE)	5
36	Aleksandra Zamachowska (POL)	15
9	Kamila Pytka (POL)	9
4	Song Se-ra (KOR)	8
8	Kseniya Pantelyeyeva (UKR)	15
77	Yu Dan-woo (KOR)	9

Semifinals
23	Roberta Marzani (ITA)	10
36	Aleksandra Zamachowska (POL)	15
9	Kamila Pytka (POL)	14
8	Kseniya Pantelyeyeva (UKR)	13

Final
36	Aleksandra Zamachowska (POL)	15
9	Kamila Pytka (POL)	8

== Final ranking ==
Rank	Athlete	Results
1st place, gold medalist(s)	Aleksandra Zamachowska (POL)	Champion
2nd place, silver medalist(s)	Kamila Pytka (POL)	Runner-up
3rd place, bronze medalist(s)	Roberta Marzani (ITA)	Semifinals
3rd place, bronze medalist(s)	Kseniya Pantelyeyeva (UKR)	Semifinals
5	Asa Linde (SWE)	Quarterfinals
6	Song Se-ra (KOR)	Quarterfinals
7	Kim Myoung-sun (KOR)	Quarterfinals
8	Yu Dan-woo (KOR)	Quarterfinals
9	Paula Schmidl (AUT)	Round of 16
10	Martyna Swatowska (POL)	Round of 16
11	Marie-Florence Candassamy (FRA)	Round of 16
12	Nicol Foietta (ITA)	Round of 16
13	Nadine Stahlberg (GER)	Round of 16
14	Catherine Nixon (USA)	Round of 16
15	Kim Jasmin Buech (SUI)	Round of 16
16	Laura Stähli (SUI)	Round of 16
17	Marta Ferrari (ITA)	Round of 32
18	Laurence Épée (FRA)	Round of 32
19	Choi Hyo-joo (KOR)	Round of 32
20	Alice Clerici (ITA)	Round of 32
21	Coco Lin Yik Hei (HKG)	Round of 32
22	Wang Yufen (CHN)	Round of 32
23	Pauline Brunner (SUI)	Round of 32
24	Anna Van Brummen (USA)	Round of 32
25	Sofia Tauriainen (FIN)	Round of 32
26	Ulyana Balaganskaya (KAZ)	Round of 32
27	Anfisa Pochkalova (UKR)	Round of 32
28	Dzhoan Feybi Bezhura (UKR)	Round of 32
29	Kata Mihaly (HUN)	Round of 32
30	Violetta Khrapina (RUS)	Round of 32
31	Irina Okhotnikova (RUS)	Round of 32
32	Eri Shiraishi (JPN)	Round of 32
33	Barbara Rutz (POL)	Round of 64
34	Amalia Tătăran (ROU)	Round of 64
35	Yulia Lichagina (RUS)	Round of 64
36	Michaela Kock (FIN)	Round of 64
37	Katharine Holmes (USA)	Round of 64
38	Noemi Moeschlin (SUI)	Round of 64
39	Lu Minmin (CHN)	Round of 64
40	Honami Suzuki (JPN)	Round of 64
41	Dorina Budai (HUN)	Round of 64
42	Anna Hornischer (GER)	Round of 64
43	Barbara VanBenthuysen (USA)	Round of 64
44	Alexandra Louis Marie (FRA)	Round of 64
45	Ayumu Saito (JPN)	Round of 64
46	Alena Komarova (RUS)	Round of 64
47	Larisa Dordevic (SWE)	Round of 64
48	Laura Szabo (HUN)	Round of 64
49	Chu Ka Mong (HKG)	Round of 64
50	Chiu Chih-ting (TPE)	Round of 64
51	Cheng Ya-fang (TPE)	Round of 64
52	Anna Salminen (FIN)	Round of 64
52	Enikő Siklósi (HUN)	Round of 64
54	Hsu Jo-ting (TPE)	Round of 64
55	Anu Hark (EST)	Round of 64
56	Madeleine Andersen (AUS)	Round of 64
57	Vanessa Riedmüller (GER)	Round of 64
58	Kabita Devi (IND)	Round of 64
59	Ebba Karlsson (SWE)	Round of 64
60	Gaia-Marianna Salm (EST)	Round of 64
61	Vera Maia Devi Kanevski (ISR)	Round of 64
62	Yuliya Svystil (UKR)	Round of 64
63	Lin Hui-min (TPE)	Round of 64
64	Debbie Ho Tik Lam (HKG)	Round of 64
65	Gerelmaa Baatarchuluun (MGL)	Round of 128
66	Ingrid Ursulet (FRA)	Round of 128
66	Marilyne Plante (CAN)	Round of 128
68	Aswathi Raj Pothu Kuttiyil (IND)	Round of Pools
69	Lilit Evoyan (ARM)	Round of Pools
70	Naira Ferreira (BRA)	Round of Pools
71	Nelli Paju (EST)	Round of Pools
72	Jyotika Dutta (IND)	Round of Pools
73	Cheryl De Jong (NED)	Round of Pools
74	Madina Azizova (EST)	Round of Pools
75	Andrea Campos Esquivel (CRC)	Round of Pools
76	Jas Seerat Singh Singh (IND)	Round of Pools
77	Carmel Tulen (NED)	Round of Pools
78	Fiona Ip (SGP)	Round of Pools
79	Geng Jiali (CHN)	Round of Pools
80	Giselle Vicatos (RSA)	Round of Pools
81	Line Baun Grubak (DEN)	Round of Pools
82	Anudari Otgonmunkh (MGL)	Round of Pools
83	Roos Kroese (NED)	Round of Pools
84	Celina Zander (SWE)	Round of Pools
84	Ellen Obster (NED)	Round of Pools
86	Amarzaya Batsaikhan (MGL)	Round of Pools
87	Tsolmon Batkhuu (MGL)	Round of Pools
88	Alanah Maclaurin (AUS)	Round of Pools
89	Indira Paudel (NEP)	Round of Pools
