= Fencing at the 2017 Summer Universiade – Women's team épée =

Women's team épée at the XXIX Summer Universiade
- Venues: Taipei Nangang Exhibition Center
- Dates: 23 August 2017
- Competitors: 75 from 20 nations

Medalists
1st place, gold medalist(s)		Kseniya Pantelyeyeva; Anfisa Pochkalova; Dzhoan Feybi Bezhura; Yuliya Svystil	Ukraine
2nd place, silver medalist(s)		Catherine Nixon; Anna Van Brummen; Katharine Holmes; Barbara VanBenthuysen	United States
3rd place, bronze medalist(s)		Aleksandra Zamachowska; Kamila Pytka; Martyna Swatowska; Barbara Rutz	Poland

The women's team épée fencing event at the 2017 Summer Universiade was held 23 August at the Taipei Nangang Exhibition Center in Taipei, Taiwan.

== Seeds ==
Since the number of individual épée event participants were 89, 90 was the added number on those who did not participate in the individual event.

Tournament Seeding	Team	Name	RI
1 (13)	Poland	Aleksandra Zamachowska	1
1 (13)	Poland	Kamila Pytka	2
1 (13)	Poland	Martyna Swatowska	10
1 (13)	Poland	Barbara Rutz	33
2 (21)	South Korea	Song Se-ra	6
2 (21)	South Korea	Kim Myoung-sun	7
2 (21)	South Korea	Yu Dan-woo	8
2 (21)	South Korea	Choi Hyo-joo	19
3 (32)	Italy	Roberta Marzani	3
3 (32)	Italy	Nicol Foietta	12
3 (32)	Italy	Marta Ferrari	17
3 (32)	Italy	Alice Clerici	20
4 (54)	Switzerland	Kim Jasmin Buech	15
4 (54)	Switzerland	Laura Stähli	16
4 (54)	Switzerland	Pauline Brunner	23
4 (54)	Switzerland	Noemi Moeschlin	38
5 (58)	Ukraine	Kseniya Pantelyeyeva	3
5 (58)	Ukraine	Anfisa Pochkalova	27
5 (58)	Ukraine	Dzhoan Feybi Bezhura	28
5 (58)	Ukraine	Yuliya Svystil	62
6 (73)	France	Marie-Florence Candassamy	11
6 (73)	France	Laurence Épée	18
6 (73)	France	Alexandra Louis Marie	44
6 (73)	France	Ingrid Ursulet	66
7 (75)	United States	Catherine Nixon	14
7 (75)	United States	Anna Van Brummen	24
7 (75)	United States	Katharine Holmes	37
7 (75)	United States	Barbara VanBenthuysen	43
8 (96)	Russia	Violetta Khrapina	30
8 (96)	Russia	Irina Okhotnikova	31
8 (96)	Russia	Yulia Lichagina	35
8 (96)	Russia	Alena Komarova	46
9 (111)	Sweden	Asa Linde	5
9 (111)	Sweden	Larisa Dordevic	47
9 (111)	Sweden	Ebba Karlsson	59
9 (111)	Sweden	Celina Zander	84
10 (112)	Germany	Nadine Stahlberg	13
10 (112)	Germany	Anna Hornischer	42
10 (112)	Germany	Vanessa Riedmüller	57
10 (112)	Germany	Anna Limbach	90
11 (113)	Finland	Sofia Tauriainen	25
11 (113)	Finland	Michaela Kock	36
11 (113)	Finland	Anna Salminen	52
12 (117)	Japan	Eri Shiraishi	32
12 (117)	Japan	Honami Suzuki	40
12 (117)	Japan	Ayumu Saito	45
13 (118)	Hungary	Kata Mihaly	29
13 (118)	Hungary	Dorina Budai	41
13 (118)	Hungary	Laura Szabo	48
13 (118)	Hungary	Enikő Siklósi	52
14 (134)	Hong Kong	Coco Lin Yik Hei	21
14 (134)	Hong Kong	Chu Ka Mong	49
14 (134)	Hong Kong	Debbie Ho Tik Lam	64
15 (140)	China	Wang Yufen	22
15 (140)	China	Lu Minmin	39
15 (140)	China	Geng Jiali	79
16 (155)	Chinese Taipei	Chiu Chih-ting	50
16 (155)	Chinese Taipei	Cheng Ya-fang	51
16 (155)	Chinese Taipei	Hsu Jo-ting	54
16 (155)	Chinese Taipei	Lin Hui-min	63
17 (186)	Estonia	Anu Hark	55
17 (186)	Estonia	Gaia-Marianna Salm	60
17 (186)	Estonia	Nelli Paju	71
17 (186)	Estonia	Madina Azizova	74
18 (198)	India	Kabita Devi	58
18 (198)	India	Aswathi Raj Pothu Kuttiyil	68
18 (198)	India	Jyotika Dutta	72
18 (198)	India	Jas Seerat Singh Singh	76
19 (233)	Mongolia	Gerelmaa Baatarchuluun	65
19 (233)	Mongolia	Anudari Otgonmunkh	82
19 (233)	Mongolia	Amarzaya Batsaikhan	86
19 (233)	Mongolia	Tsolmon Batkhuu	87
20 (233)	Netherlands	Cheryl De Jong	73
20 (233)	Netherlands	Carmel Tulen	77
20 (233)	Netherlands	Roos Kroese	83
20 (233)	Netherlands	Ellen Obster	84

== Ranking Round ==
Round of 32
17	Estonia	37
16	Chinese Taipei	36
13	Hungary	45
20	Netherlands	25
19	Mongolia	21
14	Hong Kong	45
15	China	45
18	India	29

Round of 16
1	Poland	45
17	Estonia	40
9	Sweden	17
8	Russia	45
5	Ukraine	45
12	Japan	26
13	Hungary	31
4	Switzerland	34
3	Italy	34
14	Hong Kong	26
11	Finland	32
6	France	45
7	United States	45
10	Germany	36
15	China	28
2	South Korea	45

Quarterfinals
1	Poland	41
8	Russia	40
5	Ukraine	45
4	Switzerland	33
3	Italy	40
6	France	45
7	United States	45
2	South Korea	41

Semifinals
1	Poland	38
5	Ukraine	45
6	France	35
7	United States	45

Final
5	Ukraine	45
7	United States	44

=== Bronze Medal ===
Third place
1	Poland	45
6	France	36

== Final ranking ==
Rank	Team	Results
1st place, gold medalist(s)	Ukraine	Champion
2nd place, silver medalist(s)	United States	Runner-up
3rd place, bronze medalist(s)	Poland	Third place
4	France	Semifinals
5	South Korea	Quarterfinals
6	Italy	Quarterfinals
7	Switzerland	Quarterfinals
8	Russia	Quarterfinals
9	Sweden	Round of 16
10	Germany	Round of 16
11	Finland	Round of 16
12	Japan	Round of 16
13	Hungary	Round of 16
14	Hong Kong	Round of 16
15	China	Round of 16
16	Estonia	Round of 16
17	Chinese Taipei	Round of 32
18	India	Round of 32
19	Mongolia	Round of 32
20	Netherlands	Round of 32
