= Women's épée at the 2019 World Fencing Championships =

2019 Épée competition

- Venue: SYMA Sports and Conference Centre
- Location: Budapest, Hungary
- Dates: 15–18 July

Medalists
gold medal	Nathalie Moellhausen	Brazil
silver medal	Lin Sheng	China
bronze medal	Olena Kryvytska	Ukraine
bronze medal	Vivian Kong	Hong Kong

The Women's épée competition at the 2019 World Fencing Championships was held on 18 July 2019. The qualification was held on 15 July.

== Draw ==
=== Finals ===
Semifinals
(Ukraine) Olena Kryvytska	14
(China) Lin Sheng	15
(Hong Kong) Vivian Kong	11
(Brazil) Nathalie Moellhausen	15

Final
(China) Lin Sheng	12
(Brazil) Nathalie Moellhausen	13

=== Top half ===
==== Section 1 ====
Round of 64
(Romania) Ana Maria Popescu	15
(Venezuela) Lizzie Asis	11
(Estonia) Julia Beljajeva	14
(China) Xu Anqi	15
(France) Marie-Florence Candassamy	5
(Russia) Tatyana Andryushina	15
(Canada) Malinka Hoppe	10
(Ukraine) Olena Kryvytska	15
(Russia) Violetta Kolobova	15
(Czech Republic) Michala Pěchovová	10
(Cuba) Diamelys González	10
(United Kingdom) Susan Sica	15
(United States) Katharine Holmes	15
(Romania) Amalia Tătăran	12
(India) Kabita Devi	4
(South Korea) Kang Young-mi	15

Round of 32
(Romania) Ana Maria Popescu	13
(China) Xu Anqi	12
(Russia) Tatyana Andryushina	13
(Ukraine) Olena Kryvytska	15
(Russia) Violetta Kolobova	15
(United Kingdom) Susan Sica	14
(United States) Katharine Holmes	8
(South Korea) Kang Young-mi	9

Round of 16
(Romania) Ana Maria Popescu	6
(Ukraine) Olena Kryvytska	15
(Russia) Violetta Kolobova	11
(South Korea) Kang Young-mi	15

Quarterfinals
(Ukraine) Olena Kryvytska	15
(South Korea) Kang Young-mi	14

==== Section 2 ====
Round of 64
(China) Sun Yiwen	15
(Mexico) Josefina Ramírez	9
(Spain) Sara Fernández Calleja	8
(France) Joséphine Jacques-André-Coquin	15
(South Korea) Lee Hye-in	15
(Ukraine) Yana Shemyakina	11
(Poland) Barbara Rutz	7
(United States) Kelley Hurley	15
(China) Lin Sheng	15
(Japan) Miho Yoshimura	11
(Cuba) Yamilka Rodríguez	12
(Italy) Rossella Fiamingo	11
(Kazakhstan) Ulyana Balaganskaya	12
(Hungary) Kinga Nagy	15
(Venezuela) Eliana Lugo	8
(South Korea) Choi In-jeong	15

Round of 32
(China) Sun Yiwen	15
(France) Joséphine Jacques-André-Coquin	12
(South Korea) Lee Hye-in	15
(United States) Kelley Hurley	7
(China) Lin Sheng	12
(Cuba) Yamilka Rodríguez	9
(Hungary) Kinga Nagy	15
(South Korea) Choi In-jeong	12

Round of 16
(China) Sun Yiwen	11
(South Korea) Lee Hye-in	15
(China) Lin Sheng	15
(Hungary) Kinga Nagy	7

Quarterfinals
(South Korea) Lee Hye-in	10
(China) Lin Sheng	11

=== Bottom half ===
==== Section 3 ====
Round of 64
(Hong Kong) Vivian Kong	15
(Serbia) Jana Grijak	10
(Ukraine) Kseniya Pantelyeyeva	14
(Japan) Nozomi Satō	11
(Hungary) Eszter Muhari	15
(Switzerland) Pauline Brunner	6
(Czech Republic) Kateřina Saligerová	8
(Estonia) Katrina Lehis	15
(South Korea) Jung Hyo-jung	15
(Switzerland) Noemi Moeschlin	14
(Tunisia) Sarra Besbes	15
(Estonia) Kristina Kuusk	9
(Estonia) Irina Embrich	15
(Poland) Aleksandra Zamachowska	13
(Venezuela) María Martínez	14
(France) Coraline Vitalis	15

Round of 32
(Hong Kong) Vivian Kong	15
(Ukraine) Kseniya Pantelyeyeva	11
(Hungary) Eszter Muhari	6
(Estonia) Katrina Lehis	15
(South Korea) Jung Hyo-jung	15
(Tunisia) Sarra Besbes	9
(Estonia) Irina Embrich	14
(France) Coraline Vitalis	15

Round of 16
(Hong Kong) Vivian Kong	15
(Estonia) Katrina Lehis	13
(South Korea) Jung Hyo-jung	12
(France) Coraline Vitalis	15

Quarterfinals
(Hong Kong) Vivian Kong	15
(France) Coraline Vitalis	9

==== Section 4 ====
Round of 64
(United States) Courtney Hurley	15
(Israel) Yana Botvinik	8
(Italy) Alberta Santuccio	13
(Poland) Ewa Trzebińska	9
(Brazil) Nathalie Moellhausen	15
(Poland) Renata Knapik-Miazga	12
(Uzbekistan) Malika Khakimova	7
(China) Zhu Mingye	15
(France) Auriane Mallo	15
(Canada) Leonora Mackinnon	8
(Russia) Violetta Khrapina	11
(Luxembourg) Lis Rottler-Fautsch	15
(Germany) Alexandra Ndolo	15
(Ukraine) Dzhoan Bezhura	7
(Thailand) Kanyapat Meechai	3
(Italy) Mara Navarria	15

Round of 32
(United States) Courtney Hurley	12
(Italy) Alberta Santuccio	15
(Brazil) Nathalie Moellhausen	15
(China) Zhu Mingye	10
(France) Auriane Mallo	13
(Luxembourg) Lis Rottler-Fautsch	14
(Germany) Alexandra Ndolo	15
(Italy) Mara Navarria	14

Round of 16
(Italy) Alberta Santuccio	14
(Brazil) Nathalie Moellhausen	15
(Luxembourg) Lis Rottler-Fautsch	15
(Germany) Alexandra Ndolo	12

Quarterfinals
(Brazil) Nathalie Moellhausen	11
(Luxembourg) Lis Rottler-Fautsch	10
