= Women's épée at the 2014 World Fencing Championships =

The Women's épée event of the 2014 World Fencing Championships was held on 20 July 2014. A qualification was held on 17 July.

== Medalists ==
Gold	Rossella Fiamingo (ITA)
Silver	Britta Heidemann (GER)
Bronze	Yana Shemyakina (UKR)
Bronze	Erika Kirpu (EST)

== Draw ==
=== Finals ===
Semi-finals
(Italy) Rossella Fiamingo	13
(Ukraine) Yana Shemyakina	12
(Estonia) Erika Kirpu	10
(Germany) Britta Heidemann	15

Final
(Italy) Rossella Fiamingo	15
(Germany) Britta Heidemann	11

=== Top half ===
==== Section 1 ====
Round of 64
1	(Romania) Ana Maria Brânză	15
64	(Estonia) Kristina Kuusk	13
33	(Germany) Ricarda Multerer	8
32	(Hungary) Julianna Révész	15
17	(Estonia) Irina Embrich	15
48	(Finland) Michaela Kock	9
49	(Hungary) Dorina Budai	15
16	(Tunisia) Sarra Besbes	8
9	(Italy) Rossella Fiamingo	15
56	(Brazil) Nathalie Moellhausen	9
41	(South Korea) Choi Eun-sook	10
24	(Russia) Lyubov Shutova	9
25	(United States) Kelley Hurley	15
40	(South Korea) Kim Myoung-sun	10
57	(France) Auriane Mallo	10
8	(Russia) Violetta Kolobova	15

Round of 32
1	(Romania) Ana Maria Brânză	15
32	(Hungary) Julianna Révész	11
17	(Estonia) Irina Embrich	15
49	(Hungary) Dorina Budai	9
9	(Italy) Rossella Fiamingo	15
41	(South Korea) Choi Eun-sook	5
25	(United States) Kelley Hurley	7
8	(Russia) Violetta Kolobova	15

Round of 16
1	(Romania) Ana Maria Brânză	12
17	(Estonia) Irina Embrich	15
9	(Italy) Rossella Fiamingo	15
8	(Russia) Violetta Kolobova	7

Quarterfinals
17	(Estonia) Irina Embrich	13
9	(Italy) Rossella Fiamingo	15

==== Section 2 ====
Round of 64
5	(United States) Courtney Hurley	15
60	(Poland) Dominika Mosler	14
37	(Japan) Ayaka Shimookawa	15
28	(China) Hao Jialu	13
21	(Australia) Jo Halls	5
44	(Ukraine) Olena Kryvytska	15
53	(Mexico) Alejandra Terán	8
12	(Ukraine) Yana Shemyakina	15
13	(France) Lauren Rembi	14
52	(Hong Kong) Kong Man Wai	15
45	(Switzerland) Pauline Brunner	6
20	(Germany) Imke Duplitzer	15
29	(Poland) Renata Knapik	15
36	(Germany) Monika Sozanska	11
61	(Montenegro) Veronika Soloveva	11
4	(China) Sun Yujie	15

Round of 32
5	(United States) Courtney Hurley	14
37	(Japan) Ayaka Shimookawa	15
44	(Ukraine) Olena Kryvytska	13
12	(Ukraine) Yana Shemyakina	15
52	(Hong Kong) Kong Man Wai	15
20	(Germany) Imke Duplitzer	13
29	(Poland) Renata Knapik	11
4	(China) Sun Yujie	15

Round of 16
37	(Japan) Ayaka Shimookawa	4
12	(Ukraine) Yana Shemyakina	6
52	(Hong Kong) Kong Man Wai	14
4	(China) Sun Yujie	13

Quarterfinals
12	(Ukraine) Yana Shemyakina	9
52	(Hong Kong) Kong Man Wai	8

=== Bottom half ===
==== Section 3 ====
Round of 64
3	(Estonia) Julia Beljajeva	15
62	(Kazakhstan) Jamilya Yunusbayeva	10
35	(Sweden) Sanne Gars	11
30	(Argentina) Isabel di Tella	15
19	(Estonia) Erika Kirpu	15
46	(Brazil) Amanda Simeão	9
51	(Hong Kong) Yeung Chui Ling	10
14	(Italy) Mara Navarria	15
11	(South Korea) Choi In-jeong	15
54	(Canada) Daria Jorquera	12
43	(United States) Katharine Holmes	15
22	(Italy) Bianca Del Carretto	11
27	(China) Qin Xue	15
38	(Serbia) Romana Caran	8
59	(Japan) Rie Ohashi	8
6	(Russia) Yana Zvereva	15

Round of 32
3	(Estonia) Julia Beljajeva	15
30	(Argentina) Isabel di Tella	11
19	(Estonia) Erika Kirpu	15
14	(Italy) Mara Navarria	12
11	(South Korea) Choi In-jeong	15
43	(United States) Katharine Holmes	13
27	(China) Qin Xue	15
6	(Russia) Yana Zvereva	6

Round of 16
3	(Estonia) Julia Beljajeva	9
19	(Estonia) Erika Kirpu	15
11	(South Korea) Choi In-jeong	15
27	(China) Qin Xue	11

Quarterfinals
19	(Estonia) Erika Kirpu	15
11	(South Korea) Choi In-jeong	12

==== Section 4 ====
Round of 64
7	(Germany) Britta Heidemann	15
58	(Chile) Cáterin Bravo	9
39	(Romania) Simona Gherman	15
26	(Poland) Magdalena Piekarska	10
23	(Sweden) Kinka Barvestad	4
42	(United States) Anna van Brummen	15
55	(Venezuela) Eliana Lugo	6
10	(South Korea) Shin A-lam	9
15	(France) Marie-Florence Candassamy	15
50	(United Kingdom) Corinna Lawrence	10
47	(Ukraine) Dzhoan Bezhura	15
18	(Australia) Diana Sher	9
31	(Sweden) Sophie Haarlem	12
34	(Hungary) Hajnalka Tóth	7
63	(Ukraine) Anfisa Pochkalova	12
2	(Hungary) Emese Szász	15

Round of 32
7	(Germany) Britta Heidemann	15
39	(Romania) Simona Gherman	14
42	(United States) Anna van Brummen	10
10	(South Korea) Shin A-lam	15
15	(France) Marie-Florence Candassamy	13
47	(Ukraine) Dzhoan Bezhura	14
31	(Sweden) Sophie Haarlem	2
2	(Hungary) Emese Szász	15

Round of 16
7	(Germany) Britta Heidemann	11
10	(South Korea) Shin A-lam	10
47	(Ukraine) Dzhoan Bezhura	9
2	(Hungary) Emese Szász	15

Quarterfinals
7	(Germany) Britta Heidemann	15
2	(Hungary) Emese Szász	14
