= Fencing at the 2024 Summer Olympics – Women's épée =

Women's épée at the Games of the XXXIII Olympiad
- Olympic fencing
- Venue: Grand Palais strip
- Date: 27 July 2024
- Competitors: 36 from 20 nations

Medalists
1st place, gold medalist(s)		Vivian Kong	Hong Kong
2nd place, silver medalist(s)		Auriane Mallo	France
3rd place, bronze medalist(s)		Eszter Muhari	Hungary

The women's épée event at the 2024 Summer Olympics took place on 27 July 2024 at the Grand Palais strip.

== Background ==
This was the eighth appearance of the event, which has been held at every Summer Olympics since being introduced in 1996.

The defending champion was Sun Yiwen of China, but she lost to Miho Yoshimura of Japan in the round of 32.

== Competition format ==
The 1996 tournament had vastly simplified the competition format into a single-elimination bracket, with a bronze medal match. The 2024 tournament continued to use that format. Fencing was done to 15 touches or to the completion of three three-minute rounds if neither fencer reaches 15 touches by then. At the end of time, the higher-scoring fencer was the winner; a tie resulted in an additional one-minute sudden-death time period. This sudden-death period was further modified by the selection of a draw-winner beforehand; if neither fencer scored a touch during the minute, the predetermined draw-winner won the bout. Standard épée rules regarding target area, striking, and priority were used.

== Schedule ==
The competition was held over a single day, Saturday, 27 July. Women's épée bouts alternated with the men's sabre event bouts.

All times use Central European Summer Time (UTC+2)

Date	Time	Round
Saturday, 27 July 2024	10:00; 10:50; 14:10; 15:50; 19:00; 20:40	Round of 64; Round of 32; Round of 16; Quarterfinals; Semifinals; Finals

== Results ==
=== Finals ===
Semifinals
Vivian Kong (HKG)	15
Nelli Differt (EST)	11
Auriane Mallo (FRA)	15
Eszter Muhari (HUN)	9

Final
Vivian Kong (HKG)	13
Auriane Mallo (FRA)	12
Bronze medal bout
Nelli Differt (EST)	14
Eszter Muhari (HUN)	15

=== Top half ===
==== Section 1 ====
Round of 64
Ndèye Binta Diongue (SEN)	14
Aya Hussein (EGY)	15

Round of 32
Vivian Kong (HKG)	15
Aya Hussein (EGY)	11
Pauline Brunner (SUI)	11
Hadley Husisian (USA)	12
Alexandra Ndolo (KEN)	12
Olena Kryvytska (UKR)	13
Ruien Xiao (CAN)	15
Nathalie Moellhausen (BRA)	11

Round of 16
Vivian Kong (HKG)	15
Hadley Husisian (USA)	12
Olena Kryvytska (UKR)	15
Ruien Xiao (CAN)	14

Quarterfinals
Vivian Kong (HKG)	15
Olena Kryvytska (UKR)	7

==== Section 2 ====
Round of 64
María Luisa Doig (PER)	14
Kiria Tikanah (SGP)	15

Round of 32
Giulia Rizzi (ITA)	11
Alicja Klasik (POL)	12
Kang Young-mi (KOR)	13
Nelli Differt (EST)	14
Coraline Vitalis (FRA)	15
Renata Knapik-Miazga (POL)	9
Kiria Tikanah (SGP)	10
Alberta Santuccio (ITA)	15

Round of 16
Alicja Klasik (POL)	10
Nelli Differt (EST)	11
Coraline Vitalis (FRA)	12
Alberta Santuccio (ITA)	15

Quarterfinals
Nelli Differt (EST)	10
Alberta Santuccio (ITA)	9

=== Bottom half ===
==== Section 3 ====
Round of 64
Tufaha Uwihoreye (RWA)	7
Miho Yoshimura (JPN)	15

Round of 32
Sun Yiwen (CHN)	13
Miho Yoshimura (JPN)	14
Vlada Kharkova (UKR)	15
Margherita Guzzi Vincenti (USA)	6
Rossella Fiamingo (ITA)	14
Anne Cebula (USA)	15
Dzhoan Feybi Bezhura (UKR)	13
Auriane Mallo (FRA)	14

Round of 16
Miho Yoshimura (JPN)	10
Vlada Kharkova (UKR)	15
Anne Cebula (USA)	13
Auriane Mallo (FRA)	15

Quarterfinals
Vlada Kharkova (UKR)	10
Auriane Mallo (FRA)	15

==== Section 4 ====
Round of 64
Shirwit Gaber (EGY)	9
Nardin Ehab (EGY)	15

Round of 32
Song Se-ra (KOR)	15
Martyna Swatowska-Wenglarczyk (POL)	11
Junyao Tang (CHN)	10
Eszter Muhari (HUN)	15
Lee Hye-in (KOR)	13
Yu Sihan (CHN)	15
Nardin Ehab (EGY)	10
Marie-Florence Candassamy (FRA)	15

Round of 16
Song Se-ra (KOR)	6
Eszter Muhari (HUN)	15
Yu Sihan (CHN)	15
Marie-Florence Candassamy (FRA)	10

Quarterfinals
Eszter Muhari (HUN)	15
Yu Sihan (CHN)	10
