= Feybi Bezhura =

Ukrainian fencer (born 1991)

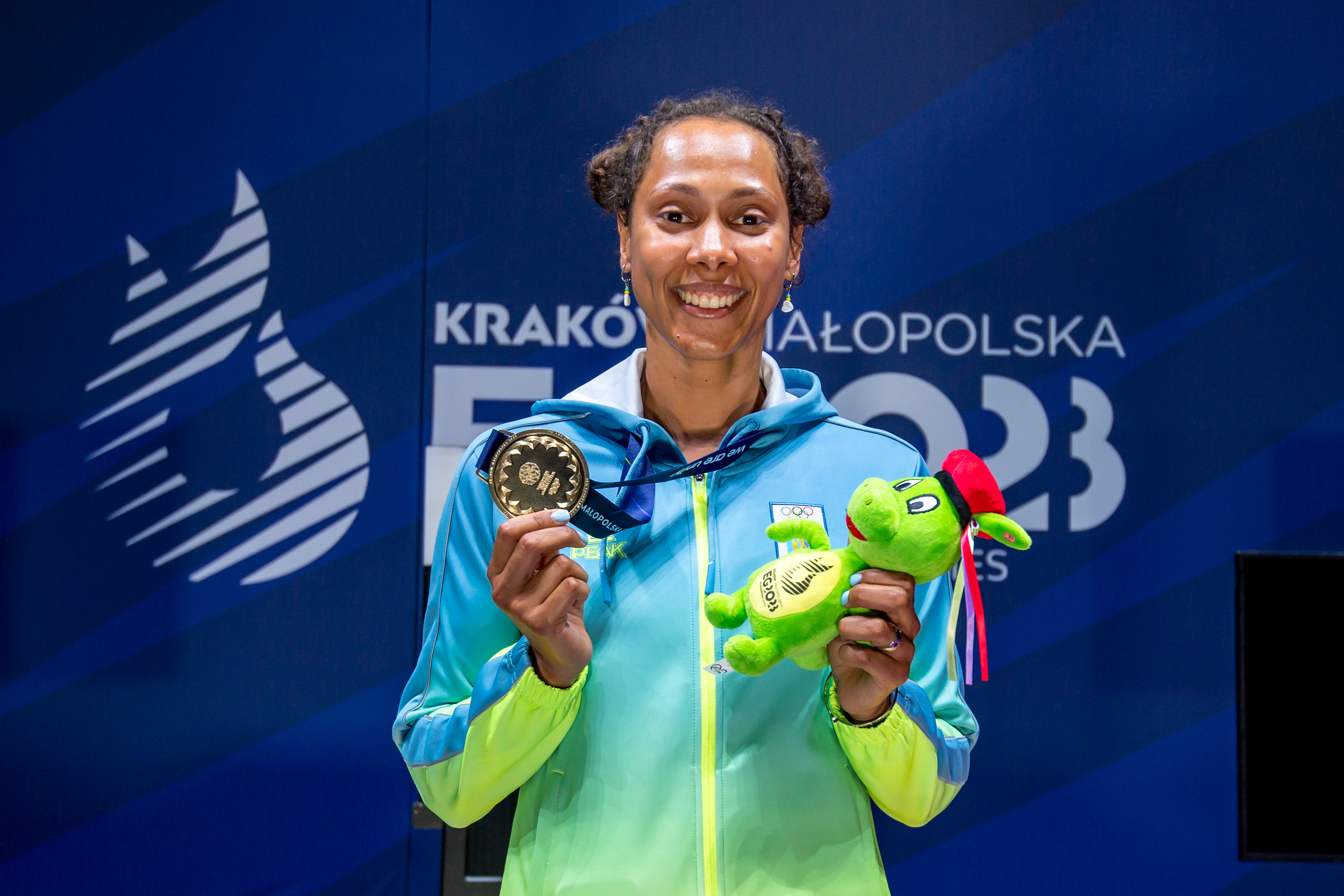
- Dzhoan Feybi Bezhura with her gold medal at the 2023 European Games

Personal information
- Full name: Dzhoan Feybi Bezhura
- Born: 22 October 1991 (age 34) Kyiv, Ukraine
- Height: 1.81 m (5 ft 11 in)

Fencing career
- Sport: Fencing
- Country: Ukraine
- Weapon: épée
- Hand: right
- National coach: Mykhailo Podolsky
- Club: Armed Forces, Kyiv School of Supreme Sports Skill
- FIE ranking: ranking
Medal record
European Games
Gold medal – first place	2023 Kraków	Individual épée
Universiade
Gold medal – first place	2017 Taipei	Team épée
Military World Games
Silver medal – second place	2019 Wuhan	Team épée
Bronze medal – third place	2019 Wuhan	Team sabre

Dzhoan Feybi Bezhura (Ukrainian: Джоан Фейбі Бежура; born 22 October 1991 in Kyiv, Ukraine) is a Ukrainian épée fencer. She is 2023 European Games champion in women's individual épée.

== Sporting career ==
Bezhura began fencing in 2005 in Kyiv and was introduced to the sport by her mother.

Bezhura debuted at the World Championships in 2013 in Budapest where she lost to Tatyana Andryushina in the round of 64. At the 2014 World Championships in Kazan, Bezhura reached round of 16 where she lost to Hungarian Emese Szász. She qualified for the main round of the 2017 World Championships in Leipzig but she lost to German Alexandra Ndolo in the round of 32. She also competed at the 2017 Summer Universiade in Taipei. She won gold medal in the team competition. In the individual event, she won against Katharine Holmes from the US in the round of 64, but lost to Polish Martyna Swatowska in the round of 32. At the 2018 World Championships in Wuxi, Bezhura defeated Renata Knapik-Miazga from Poland and Irina Embrich from Estonia to proceed to the round of 16 but then she lost to the eventual silver medallist Ana Maria Brânză from Romania. The next Worlds in Budapest was less successful with Bezhura losing to German Alexandra Ndolo in the round of 64.

Together with Olena Kryvytska, Kseniya Pantelyeyeva, and Anfisa Pochkalova, Bezhura finished 4th at the 2018 European Fencing Championships in Novi Sad. One year earlier, the Ukrainian team with the same roster was 7th at the 2017 Europeans in Tbilisi.

She unexpectedly became champion of the 2023 European Games. She defeated Polish Martyna Swatowska-Wenglarczyk in the final. In the team competition, Bezhura together with Inna Brovko, Vlada Kharkova and Olena Kryvytska finished 5th after losing to Switzerland in the quarterfinal.

== Personal life ==
Bezhura born into a family of a Ukrainian mother and a Ugandan father. She graduated from National University of Ukraine on Physical Education and Sport. In 2022, she gave birth to a child.
