= Lyubov Shutova =

Russian fencer

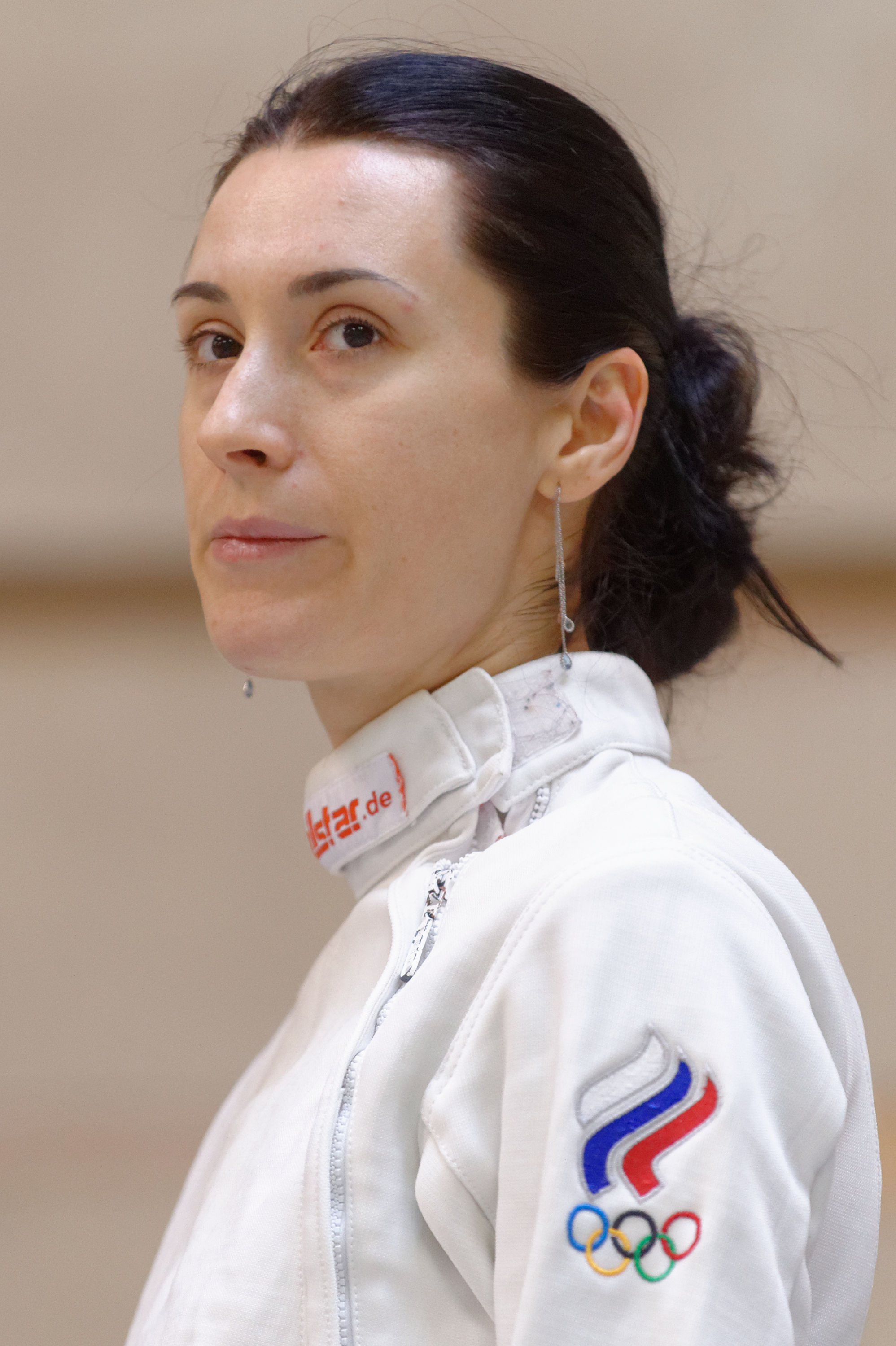
- Shutova in 2015

Personal information
- Full name: Lyubov Andreyevna Shutova
- Born: 25 June 1983 (age 43) Novosibirsk, Russian SFSR, Soviet Union
- Height: 1.77 m (5 ft 10 in)
- Weight: 62 kg (137 lb)

Fencing career
- Sport: Fencing
- Country: Russia
- Weapon: Épée
- Hand: Right-handed
- National coach: Aleksandr Glazunov
- Club: Dynamo Moscow
- Personal coach: Sergey Dovgosheya
- FIE ranking: current ranking
Medal record
Women's épée fencing
Representing Russia
Olympic Games
Bronze medal – third place	2016 Rio de Janeiro	Team épée
World Championships
Gold medal – first place	2009 Antalya	Individual épée
Gold medal – first place	2014 Kazan	Team épée
Silver medal – second place	2007 St Petersburg	Team épée
Silver medal – second place	2019 Budapest	Team épée
European Championships
Gold medal – first place	2012 Legnano	Team épée
Silver medal – second place	2011 Sheffield	Team épée
Silver medal – second place	2014 Strasbourg	Team épée
Silver medal – second place	2019 Düsseldorf	Team épée
Bronze medal – third place	2002 Moscow	Individual épée
Bronze medal – third place	2012 Legnano	Individual épée

Lyubov Andreyevna Shutova (Russian: Любовь Андреевна Шутова; born 25 June 1983) is a Russian fencer, World champion in 2009 and team World champion in 2013 and 2014. Bronze medallist of a team event at 2016 Summer Olympics in Rio de Janeiro.

== Personal life ==
Shutova took up fencing at the age of twelve after being invited to watch a training session at her local club. She trained under the direction of Sergey Dovgosheya, a friend of her parents, who she describes as a second father and who remained her personal coach as of 2014.

Shutova married sports journalist Nikolay Lukinskiy. They have a daughter, Anastasia and a son, Fedor.

== Career ==
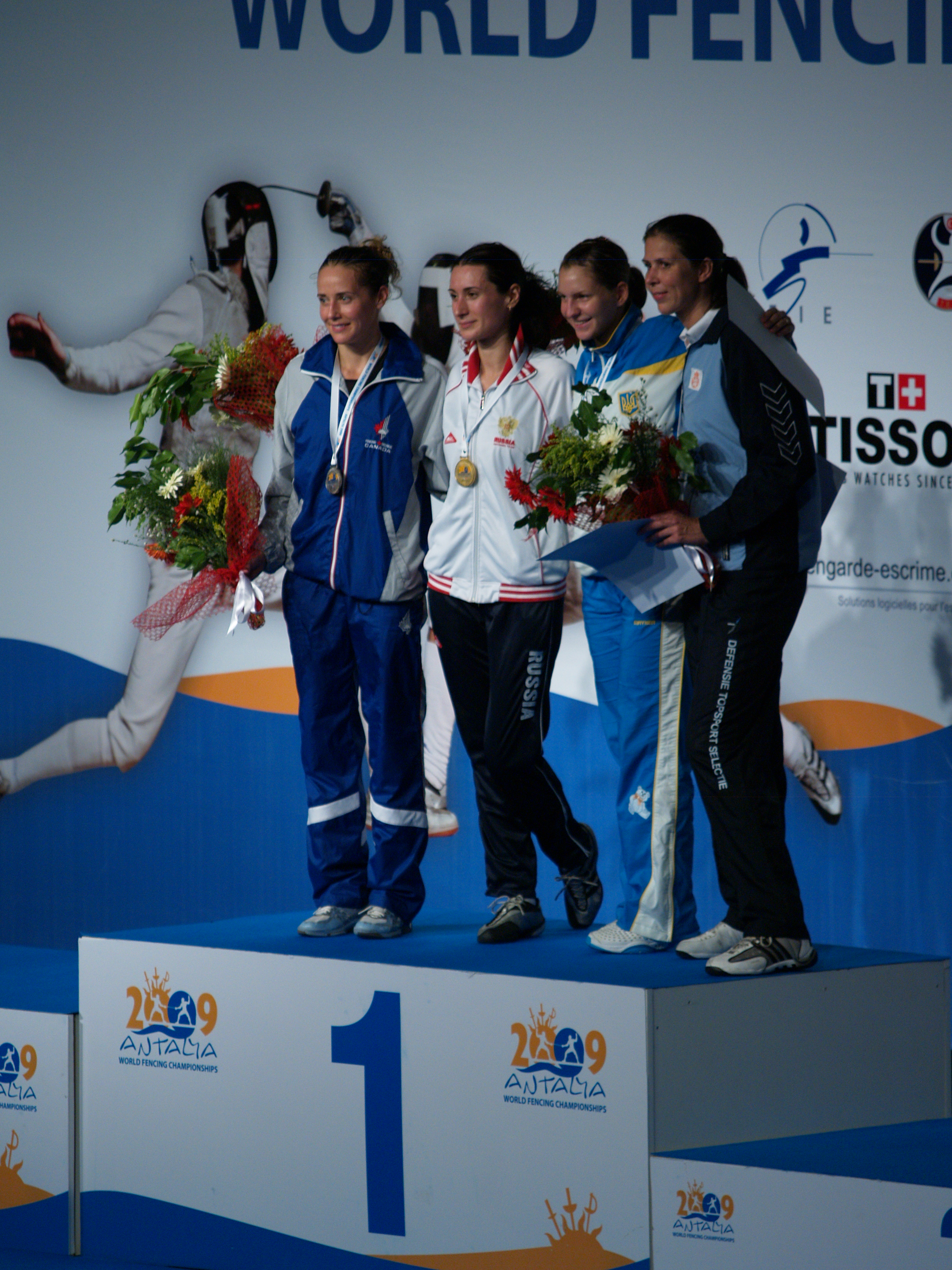
Shutova (2nd to the left) on the podium of the 2009 World Fencing Championships

Shutova joined the national team for the 1998 World Youth Games in Moscow. In 2000, she earned a silver medal at the Junior European Championships in Antalya. The same year she won a team gold medal at the Junior World Championships in South Bend, Indiana, in the United States.

In the senior category Shutova earned a bronze medal in the 2002 European Championships in Moscow. She climbed her first World Cup podium with a silver medal in the 2008 Nanjing Grand Prix. The same year she competed at the Beijing Olympics in Women's épée and reached the quarter-finals, where she was stopped by eventual silver medal Ana Maria Brânză of Romania.

In the 2008–09 season Shutova won her first World Cup title in Saint-Maur. At the World Championships in Antalya she edged out France's Laura Flessel-Colovic in the quarter-final, then prevailed over Anfisa Pochkalova of Ukraine to meet Canada's Sherraine Schalm in the final. After a tight match Shutova struck the decisive hit on priority and won Russia's first World title in women's épée. She finished the season World No.6, a career best as of 2014.

In the 2012 Summer Olympics, she was defeated in the second round by Ukraine's Yana Shemyakina, who eventually won the gold medal. In the team event Russia prevailed over Ukraine, then met No.3 seed China in the semi-finals. Sun Yi eventually gave China the victory in overtime. Russia then fenced the United States in the match for bronze. Shutova entered her last relay with the score tied at 23, but was outscored 2–4 by Maya Lawrence. Russia exited the competition with no medal.

In the 2012–13 season Shutova was replaced by Tatyana Andrushina in the national team. She was selected again the next season, as team captain Anna Sivkova was injured. At the European Championships she reached the quarter-finals, where she was defeated by France's Marie-Florence Candassamy. In the team event No.1 seed Russia met Romania in the final. Shutova entered the last leg on a tie, but Simona Gherman struck four hits in a row to give Romania the lead in the last minute of the match. Shutova launched into a series of flèches, to no avail: Russia was defeated 38–34 and came away with a silver medal. At the World Championships in Kazan, Shutova was defeated in the first round by Korea's Choi Eun-sook. In the team event, Russia prevailed narrowly over South Korea in the quarter-finals, then beat Hungary and Estonia in the final to win the gold medal.
