= Anne Cebula =

American fencer and model (born 1998)

Personal information
- Born: July 3, 1998 (age 28) Brooklyn, New York City, New York, U.S.

Fencing career
- Sport: Fencing
- Country: United States

Anne Cebula (/səˈbuːlə/ sə-BOO-lə; born July 3, 1998) is an American épée fencer and model. She competed in the 2024 Summer Olympics.

A Brooklyn native daughter of Polish immigrants, Anne Cebula began fencing at the age of fifteen, at Brooklyn Technical High School. She saw the sport for the first time on television when she was 10 years old, after watching USA's Keeth Smart win the last team match against Russia at the Beijing 2008 Olympics. Her parents did not allow her to pursue it because of the costs.

One of the reasons she chose Brooklyn Tech was because of their free fencing club.

After showing potential, her high school coach, Bert Yaged, recommended that she try a summer camp at any club in the city.

She did a week-long day camp at Fencers Club in 2013, where she met coach Kornel Udvarhelyi. She worked with him until he moved to Boston in 2021.

After transferring from Fordham University to Barnard College during the second semester of her sophomore year, she walked onto Columbia University's fencing team. She qualified for the US Junior Team and attended Junior World Championships 2018 in Verona, Italy that semester.

Her junior year, she won NCAA Championships in Individual Women's Epee and in Overall Team. This made her the first Barnard College student in school history to win an individual national title in any sport.

The team won the Women's Ivy League Fencing Championships in 2018, 2019, and 2020. During her senior year, she qualified again for NCAA Championships, but it was cancelled due to the outbreak of the Covid-19 pandemic. She graduated in May 2020, majoring in Neuroscience & Behavior. Anne began working with coach Sergey Danilov in 2021 in preparation for the Olympic Games.

She finished as the highest ranked American in women's epee on May 1, 2024, qualifying for both the individual and team events.

In the individual event, she won her first match 15-14 against Rossella Fiamingo (three time Olympic medalist; eventual 2024 Olympic gold medalist in team). She lost her next match 13-15 against Auriane Mallo-Breton Olympic silver medalist in both individual and team). This resulted in her 13th place finish.

In the team event, she went +2 overall against Poland, but the overall team score ended at a loss, 29-31.The team fenced in the back bracket for placement and ended in 7th place.

While training, Anne worked as a professional model through Elite Model Management. She has worked with Khaite, Tory Burch, and Marc Jacobs - opening for him during the F/W 22 season.
