= Women's team épée at the 2019 World Fencing Championships =

- Venue: SYMA Sports and Conference Centre
- Location: Budapest, Hungary
- Dates: 20–21 July

Medalists
gold medal	Lin Sheng; Sun Yiwen; Xu Anqi; Zhu Mingye	China
silver medal	Tatyana Andryushina; Violetta Khrapina; Violetta Kolobova; Lyubov Shutova	Russia
bronze medal	Alice Clerici; Rossella Fiamingo; Federica Isola; Mara Navarria	Italy

The Women's team épée competition at the 2019 World Fencing Championships was held on 20 and 21 July 2019.

== Draw ==
=== Finals ===
Semifinals
Italy	31
China	44
Russia	42
Ukraine	40

Final
China	29
Russia	28
Third place
Italy	45
Ukraine	36

=== Top half ===
==== Section 1 ====
Round of 64

Team 1	Score	Team 2
Costa Rica	41–45	Vietnam

Round of 32
United States	45
Vietnam	21
Spain	22
Canada	45
Germany	45
Australia	22
Thailand	28
Italy	45

Round of 16
United States	45
Canada	25
Germany	28
Italy	29

Quarterfinals
United States	22
Italy	25

==== Section 2 ====
Round of 32
China	45
India	21
Singapore	26
Hungary	45
Romania	45
Kazakhstan	37
Mexico	23
South Korea	45

Round of 16
China	42
Hungary	36
Romania	42
South Korea	45

Quarterfinals
China	45
South Korea	40

=== Bottom half ===
==== Section 3 ====
Round of 64

Team 1	Score	Team 2
Jordan	27–45	Iran

Round of 32
Russia	45
Iran	22
Brazil	38
Japan	45
Hong Kong	40
Venezuela	32
Argentina	28
Estonia	45

Round of 16
Russia	45
Japan	39
Hong Kong	25
Estonia	38

Quarterfinals
Russia	45
Estonia	35

==== Section 4 ====
Round of 64

Team 1	Score	Team 2
Cuba	45–33	Serbia

Round of 32
France	45
Czech Republic	37
Israel	27
Ukraine	45
Switzerland	45
Egypt	31
Cuba	32
Poland	45

Round of 16
France	44
Ukraine	45
Switzerland	37
Poland	45

Quarterfinals
Ukraine	45
Poland	38

=== Placement rounds ===
==== 5–8th place bracket ====
5–8th place semifinals
United States	34
South Korea	31
Estonia	45
Poland	35

Fifth place
United States	35
Estonia	30
Seventh place
South Korea	45
Poland	27

==== 9–16th place bracket ====
9–16th place quarterfinals
Canada	39
Germany	45
Hungary	37
Romania	45
Japan	41
Hong Kong	39
France	45
Switzerland	40

9–12th place semifinals
Germany	30
Romania	45
Japan	23
France	45

Ninth place
Romania	32
France	45
Eleventh place
Germany	36
Japan	37

==== 13–16th place bracket ====
13–16th place semifinals
Canada	37
Hungary	45
Hong Kong	40
Switzerland	45

13th place
Hungary	45
Switzerland	29
15th place
Canada	41
Hong Kong	40

== Final ranking ==
Rank	Team
1st place, gold medalist(s)	China
2nd place, silver medalist(s)	Russia
3rd place, bronze medalist(s)	Italy
4	Ukraine
5	United States
6	Estonia
7	South Korea
8	Poland
9	France
10	Romania
11	Japan
12	Germany
13	Hungary
14	Switzerland
15	Canada
16	Hong Kong
17	Spain
18	Egypt
19	Brazil
20	Kazakhstan
21	Singapore
22	Venezuela
23	Israel
24	Australia
25	Thailand
26	Czech Republic
27	Argentina
28	India
29	Mexico
30	Iran
31	Cuba
32	Vietnam
33	Costa Rica
34	Jordan
34	Serbia
