= Lin Sheng =

Chinese fencer (born 1994)

Personal information
- Nationality: Chinese
- Born: 1 May 1994 (age 32) Fuzhou, China

Sport
- Country: China
- Sport: Fencing
- Event: Épée
- Club: Fujian
Medal record
World Championships
Gold medal – first place	2019 Budapest	Team
Silver medal – second place	2019 Budapest	Individual
Bronze medal – third place	2018 Wuxi	Team

Lin Sheng (林声; born 5 January 1994) is a Chinese fencer.

== Career ==
Lin is from Fuzhou, Fujian. She won a gold medal in the girls' épée event at the 2010 Summer Youth Olympics. She was part of the Chinese girls' team which won gold in the team épée event at the 2011 Junior World Fencing Championships. At the 2015 International Fencing Federation Épée Grand Prix in Rio de Janeiro, she placed 40th. She won gold in the team épée event at the 2014 Asian Fencing Championships, along with teammates Qin Xue, Sun Yiwen, and Sun Yujie. She withdrew from the competition to represent China in fencing at the 2016 Summer Olympics due to health issues, but recovered later that year, and won gold in the women's individual épée event at the 2016 Chinese Fencing Championships.
