= Lviv State University of Physical Culture =

Public university in Lviv, Ukraine

- Львівський державний університет фізичної культури
- Type: National university
- Established: 1946
- Accreditation: Ministry of Education and Science of Ukraine
- Academic affiliations: IAU
- Students: 1800
- Location: Lviv, Ukraine; 49.8412°N 24.0227°E
- Campus: Urban
- Website: ldufk.edu.ua
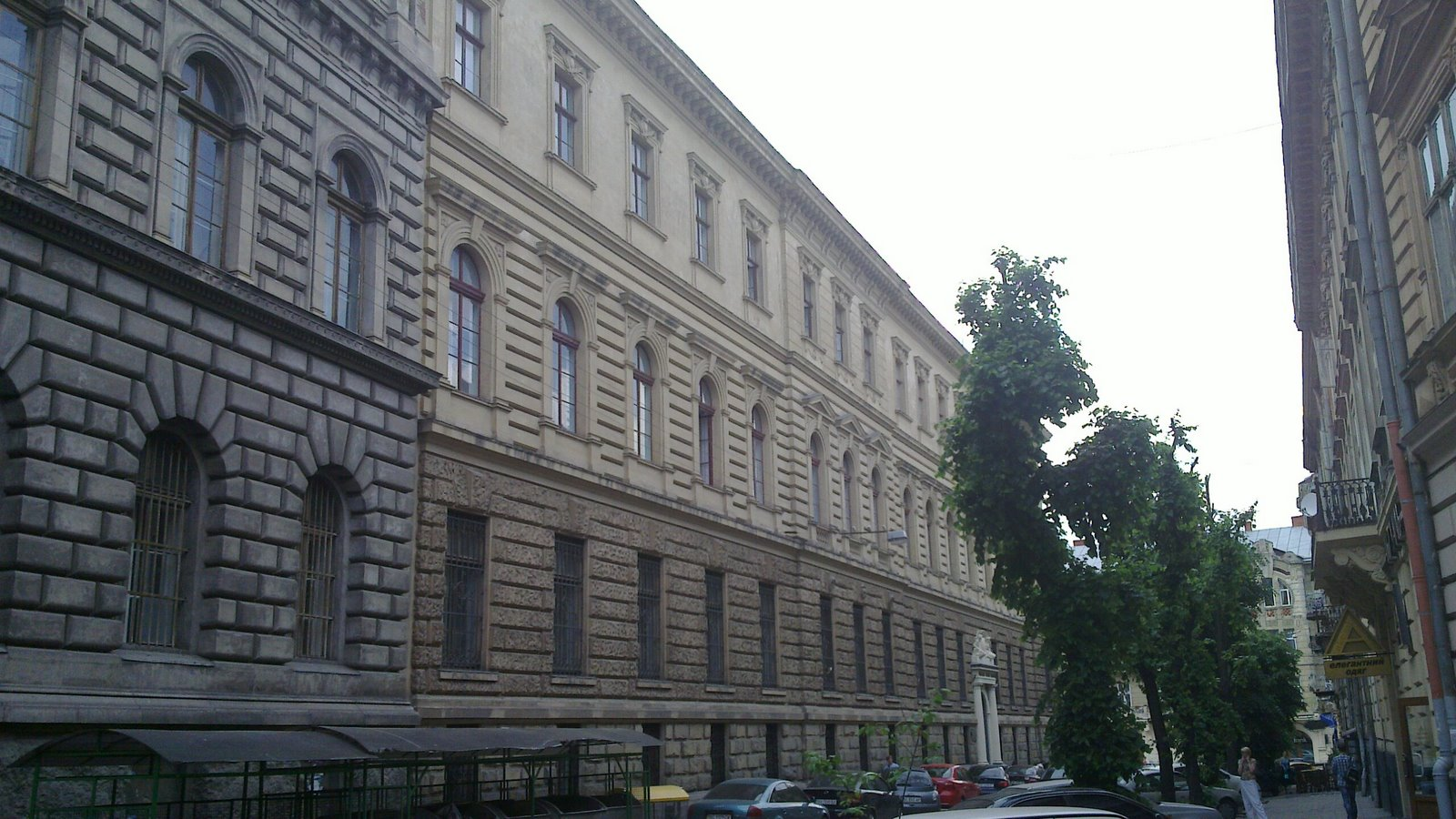

The Lviv State University of Physical Culture (Ukrainian: Львівський державний університет фізичної культури, romanized: Lvivskyi derzhavnyi universytet fizychnoi kultury) is a university specializing in sports education located in Lviv, Ukraine.

== History ==
Lviv State University of Physical Culture was established as a Soviet educational institution specializing in sports education. On May 7, 1946 by order of the USSR Council of Ministers in Lviv was established Lviv State Institute of Physical Culture on basis of the existing school (technicum) of Physical Culture as well as sports facilities of the Lviv branch of Spartak sports society that previously belonged to the Polish Sokol gymnastic association.

The institute was established with an officially declared goal to prepare highly qualified personnel especially for the western regions of the USSR and scientific development of physical education and sports, scientific and methodological assistance to various sports organizations. Initially the institute consisted of a teaching faculty, 15 departments, 150 students enrolled.

In May 1958 institute was given consultative point of correspondence of the Kiev Institute of Physical Culture. Actually, it started in LDIFK distance learning, and in 1964 formed a separate department.

In 1959 the Institute opened a school coaches with two years of training, which lasted until 1964. In addition, in 1960 began working evening division.

In 1969/1970 was opened in LDIFK sports department. At that time specialists were trained at three faculties: teaching, sports and correspondence. If the 1956 school was 542 students, then in 1974 trained 1,245 people in stationary and 434 extramural students.

In the 70s years in the institute taught: Victor Chukarin - absolute world champion in 1964, USSR - 1949, 1951, 1955; XV-XVI Olympic Games; Andrievsky Vadim - USSR Champion in Fencing (1946), honored coach of the USSR, Vladimir Safronov - champion of the USSR (1975), silver medalist in gymnastics world Cup (1975) and many other celebrities.

=== 1981-1991 ===
In 1981 Lviv State Institute of Physical Education, one of the leading sports educational institutions of the country, celebrated its 35th anniversary. Then he had a structural reorganization. New perspectives for the development of the institute came after proclamation of independence of Ukraine in 1991.

Given the centuries-old traditions of the Ukrainian Physical Culture, it was necessary to create a national system of physical education and sports, from the introduction of the Ukrainian language in spravoznavstvo and teaching, curriculum development and programs, publication of educational literature, the introduction of new disciplines, including history of Ukraine, history of Ukrainian culture, history of Ukrainian sports movement, processing and finishing and developing Ukrainian sports terminology and education specialists sports profile, including athletes who have felt the connection with the state in which they were born, live, study, for which they compete in different sports forums.

To address these challenging tasks it needed not only proper material resources, financing, but also nationally conscious professionals. This was possible under favorable political, economic and spiritual situation in the country. Certainly, the leadership of the Lviv State Institute of Physical Culture had to overcome the difficulties which experienced the young state.

With appointment to the post of rector, the famous sports specialist, master of sports, champion of Ukraine and the USSR Honored Coach of Ukraine Miroslav S. Hertsyka, in the development of the institute entered a new period.

To expand the areas and improve the quality of training in the sports department in 1996 was established the department of rehabilitation and recreation, and the Department of Economics of Sports, Recreation and Physical culture theory and methodology of Olympic and professional sports. With Ukraine's accession to the Bologna Convention LDIFK purposefully moves to credit modular system, are introduced new forms and methods of training. Institute, according to the list of specialties within their field of physical culture and sports, trains specialists of different levels - bachelors, and masters.

At the meeting on the occasion of Institute 60 years the Cabinet of Ministers of Ukraine declared an order of August 3, 2006

== Administration ==
The Administrators of the university are as following:

Administration status	Administrator
Rector of Lviv State University of Physical Culture, professor, Doctor of Pedagogics, Honoured Scientist and Engineering's Worker of Ukraine, Member of Ukrainian Academy of Sciences, Honoured Worker of Physical Culture and Sport.	Yevhen Prystupa
Vice-rector at Educational Work, PhD of Biological Sciences, Docent, Excellent Worker of Ukrainian Education, Honoured Worker of Physical Culture and Sport	Fedir Muzyka
Vice-rector at Science and External Relations, PhD of Pedagogical Sciences, Professor	Mykhaylo Lynets
Vice-rector at Administrative and Supply Work.	Roman Lobay

== Faculties ==
The following Faculties exist at the university:

- Faculty of Human health and tourism;
- Faculty of Physical Training;
- Faculty of Sport;
- Faculty for heightening qualification, retraining, postgraduate and distance education.

== Student life ==
IN 1996 Alina and Michael Senytsi created Theatre of Sport Living Silver.

Theatre of Sport is laureate of international festivals, competitions and presentations in Ukraine, Slovakia and Poland.

It includes leading sportsmen - masters of sports of Ukraine: male group - members of the national team of Ukraine, absolute winners of the championship of Ukraine, winners of European championship, European Championships and World Cup on sports acrobatics (Rostislav Romanyak, Konstantin Hnatiuk, Andrey Moskwa, Roman Petsukh); female couple - finalists UEFA European Under (Catherine Kotsur, Elena Moskwa), Master of Sports of Ukraine, winners of national and international competitions in acrobatics, gymnastics, aerobics and fitness, sports dance, hopak.

== International relations ==
The University maintains creative relationships with organizations and universities of Australia, Belarus, Georgia, Estonia, Canada, Netherlands, Germany, Poland, Slovenia, USA, Hungary, Russia, Czech Republic.

LDUFK is a member of:

- since 1998, the European Network of Sport Science, Education and Employment (ENSSEE);
- since 2001 - the member of the International Council of Health, Physical Education, Recreation, Sport and Dance (ICHPER-SD);
- since 2002 - member of the Association university athletic profile in Eastern Europe and Central Asia
- since 2008 - member of the network "European Athlete as Student" (Sweden).
- since 2007 scientific publications Lviv State University of Physical Culture registered in East European Bibliographical Society «Index Copernicus», where they are given the rating.

The international activity of the university directed to further integration into European and world sports structures.

University of Physical Education does not stop there, and wants establish partner relations with other countries.

== Structure ==
The faculties of the university are:

- Department of theory and methodology of physical education
- Department of theoretical and methodological foundations of sport
- Department of Recreation and Physical Culture of Recuperation
- Department of Physical Rehabilitation
- Department of Anatomy and Physiology
- Department of Biochemistry and Hygiene
- Department Valeology and Sports Medicine
- Department of Sport Games
- Football Department
- Department of Athletics
- Department of athletic sports
- Department of winter sports
- Department of Water Sports
- Department of fencing, boxing and national odnoborstv
- Department of gymnastics and choreography
- Department of Technical and shooting sports
- Department of Tourism
- Department of Economics, Informatics and kineziolohiyi
- Department of Education and Psychology
- Department of Philosophy
- Department of Foreign Languages

== Notable alumni ==
- Oleksandr Usyk, boxer
- Viktor Chukarin, gymnast
- Andriy Husin, footballer
- Vassily Ivanchuk, chess grandmaster
- Anfisa Pochkalova, Épée Fencer
- Yana Shemyakina, Épée Fencer
- Olha Knysh, alpine skier

== See also ==
List of universities in Ukraine
