= Roberta Marzani =

Italian fencer (born 1996)

Personal information
- Born: 8 July 1996 (age 30) Bergamo, Italy

Sport
- Country: Italy
- Sport: Fencing
Medal record
Women's épée
Representing Italy
Mediterranean Games
Gold medal – first place	2018 Tarragona	Individual
Gold medal – first place	2026 Taranto	Individual
Bronze medal – third place	2022 Oran	Individual
Universiade
Silver medal – second place	2019 Naples	Team
Silver medal – second place	2021 Chengdu	Team
Bronze medal – third place	2017 Taipei	Individual
Bronze medal – third place	2019 Naples	Individual

Roberta Marzani (born 8 July 1996) is an Italian fencer. She is a two-time Mediterranean Games gold medalist. She won a bronze medal at the 2019 Summer Universiade.

== Biography ==
She won one of the bronze medals in the women's individual épée event at the 2022 Mediterranean Games held in Oran, Algeria.

== See also ==
- Italy at the 2019 Summer Universiade
