= Eszter Muhari =

Hungarian fencer (born 2002)

Personal information
- Born: 30 September 2002 (age 24) Budapest, Hungary

Fencing career
- Sport: Fencing
- Country: Hungary
- Weapon: Épée
- Hand: Left-handed
Medal record
Women's épée
Representing Hungary
Olympic Games
Bronze medal – third place	2024 Paris	Individual
European Games
Silver medal – second place	2023 Kraków–Małopolska	Team
European Championships
Silver medal – second place	2023 Kraków	Team
Silver medal – second place	2024 Basel	Team
Silver medal – second place	2026 Antony	Team
Bronze medal – third place	2026 Antony	Individual
World University Games
Bronze medal – third place	2021 Chengdu	Team

Eszter Muhari (born 30 September 2002) is a Hungarian fencer.

At the 2023 European Games in Kraków, Poland, she won the silver medal in the women's team épée event. In 2024, she won the silver medal in the women's team épée event at the European Fencing Championships in Basel, Switzerland.

She represented Hungary at the 2024 Summer Olympics held in Paris, France, where she won the bronze medal in the women's épée event.

== Medal record ==
=== Olympic Games ===
Year	Location	Event	Position
2024	Paris, France	Individual Women's Épée	3rd

== See also ==
- List of NCAA fencing champions
