= Kseniya Pantelyeyeva =

Ukrainian fencer (born 1994)

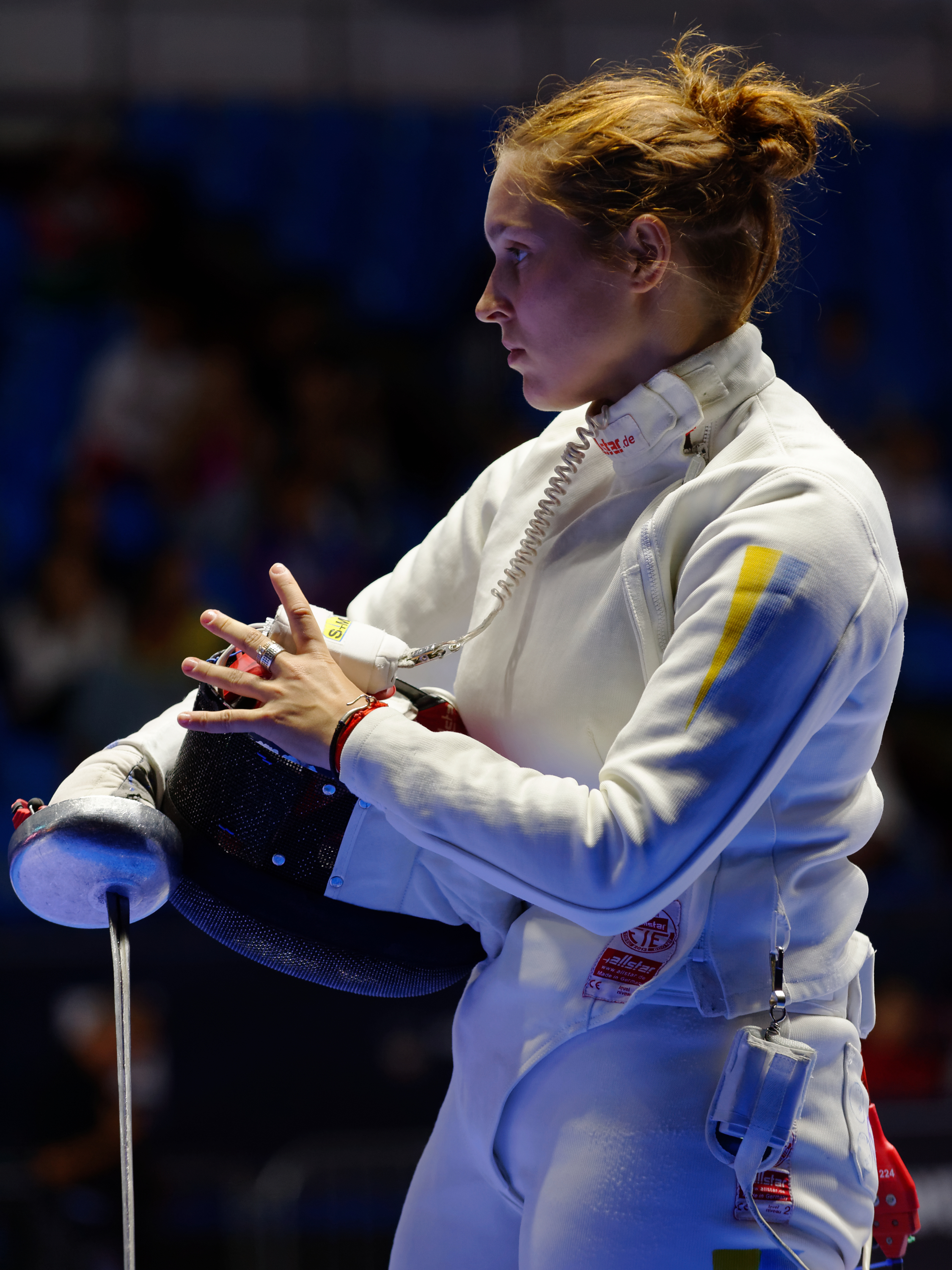
- Kseniya Pantelyeyeva at the 2015 World Fencing Championships

Personal information
- Full name: Kseniya Hennadiyivna Pantelyeyeva
- Born: 11 May 1994 (age 32) Lviv, Ukraine
- Height: 1.67 m (5 ft 6 in)
- Weight: 67 kg (148 lb; 10.6 st)

Fencing career
- Sport: Fencing
- Country: Ukraine
- Weapon: épée
- Hand: right-handed
- National coach: Andriy Orlikovskîi
- Club: Dynamo
- FIE ranking: ranking
Medal record
World Championships
Bronze medal – third place	2015 Moscow	Team
Universiade
Gold medal – first place	2017 Taipei	Team
Bronze medal – third place	2017 Taipei	Individual
Bronze medal – third place	2013 Kazan	Team

Kseniya Hennadiyivna Pantelyeyeva (Ukrainian: Ксенія Геннадіївна Пантелєєва; born 11 May 1994) is a Ukrainian fencer. She competed at the 2012 Summer Olympics in the Women's épée, but was defeated in the second round. She was team bronze medallist at the 2015 World Fencing Championships in Moscow.

Pantelyeyeva is a student at the Lviv State University of Physical Culture.
