= Yulia Lichagina =

Russian fencer

Personal information
- Nationality: Russia
- Born: 7 April 1994 (age 30)

Sport
- Sport: Fencing

Yulia Sergeyevna Lichagina (Russian: Юлия Сергеевна Личагина; born 7 April 1994) is a Russian épée fencer. She competed in the 2020 Summer Olympics.
