= Alice Clerici =

Italian fencer

Personal information
- Born: 15 June 1996 (age 30)

Fencing career
- Sport: Fencing
- Country: Italy
- Weapon: Épée
- Hand: right-handed
- Club: Fiamme Oro
- FIE ranking: current ranking
Medal record
World Championships
Bronze medal – third place	2019 Budapest	Team
European Championships
Bronze medal – third place	2019 Düsseldorf	Team

Alice Clerici (born 15 June 1996) is an Italian épée fencer.

She participated at the 2019 World Fencing Championships, winning a bronze medal.
