= Mara Navarria =

Italian fencer (born 1985)

Personal information
- Born: 18 July 1985 (age 41) Udine, Italy
- Height: 1.72 m (5 ft 8 in)
- Weight: 75 kg (165 lb)

Fencing career
- Sport: Fencing
- Country: Italy
- Weapon: Épée
- Hand: right-handed
- National coach: Sandro Cuomo
- Club: CS Esercito
- Head coach: Oleg Pouzanov
- FIE ranking: current ranking
Medal record
Women's épée
Representing Italy
Olympic Games
Gold medal – first place	2024 Paris	Team épée
Bronze medal – third place	2020 Tokyo	Team épée
World Championships
Gold medal – first place	2018 Wuxi	Individual
Silver medal – second place	2022 Cairo	Team
Silver medal – second place	2023 Milan	Team
Bronze medal – third place	2011 Catania	Team
Bronze medal – third place	2014 Kazan	Team
Bronze medal – third place	2019 Budapest	Team
Bronze medal – third place	2023 Milan	Individual
European Games
Bronze medal – third place	2023 Kraków–Małopolska	Team
European Championships
Gold medal – first place	2024 Basel	Team
Silver medal – second place	2010 Leipzig	Team
Silver medal – second place	2022 Antalya	Team
Silver medal – second place	2023 Plovdiv	Individual
Bronze medal – third place	2014 Strasbourg	Team
Bronze medal – third place	2015 Montreux	Team
Bronze medal – third place	2019 Düsseldorf	Team
Bronze medal – third place	2022 Antalya	Individual
Bronze medal – third place	2023 Kraków	Team

Mara Navarria (Italian: [ˈmaːra navarˈriːa]; born 18 July 1985) is an Italian former right-handed épée fencer, 2018 individual world champion, two-time Olympian, and 2024 team Olympic gold medalist.

== Early and personal life ==
Navarria, whose paternal grandfather was from Sicily, was born in Udine and grew up in Carlino. She took up fencing at AS Sangiorgina (now Gemina Scherma) in San Giorgio di Nogaro under the coaching of Dario Codarin. After her secondary studies in Cervignano, she moved to Rome to join Centro Sportivo Esercito, the sport section of the Italian Army, under coach Oleg Pouzanov.

Navarria married her physical trainer Andrea Lo Coco. They have a son, Samuele. Her sister Caterina and her brother Enrico are sabre fencers.

== Career ==
She won the Fencing World Cup in the junior category in 2004 and 2006. She was first selected into the senior Italian team for the 2005 European Fencing Championships, where she finished 49th in the individual event and 9th with the team.

In the 2009–10 season Navarria was part of the Italian team that earned a silver medal after being defeated in the final by Poland. The year after, at the World Championships on home ground, in Catania, Navarria was stopped in the table of 16 by Poland's Magdalena Piekarska and finished 12th. In the team event, Italy lost in the semifinal to China, which had just placed two fencers on the individual podium. They defeated Germany 45–33 to win the bronze medal.

Navarria began the 2011–12 season by her first victory in the senior World Cup with a gold medal in Doha, followed by a silver medal in Budapest. She qualified to the 2012 Summer Olympics as a member of the Italian team. In the individual event, she was defeated in the table of 32 by Maya Lawrence of the United States. In the team event, Italy lost to the United States in the first round and ended up 7th after the ranking matches. Navarria finished the season 12th in world rankings, a career best as of 2014.

Navarria took a break in her career in the 2012–13 season to give birth to a son, Samuele. She came back to competition at the 2013 Mediterranean Games in Mersin, where she finished 7th. At the World Championships in Budapest, she was stopped in the quarter-finals by Russia's Anna Sivkova, who eventually earned a silver medal. In the team event Italy lost to Russia 27 to 28 in the quarter-finals and finished 5th.

The following season, Navarria reached the quarter-finals in the Havana and Rio de Janeiro World Cup tournaments. In the 2014 European Championships, she lost to France's Lauren Rembi in the second round. In the team event, Italy were defeated by Romania in the semi-finals. They then prevailed over Estonia to earn a bronze medal. In the World Championships in Kazan, Navarria was knocked off in the second round by Estonia's Erika Kirpu, who would eventually take the silver medal. In the team event, Italy took revenge on Romania in the quarter-finals, but lost to Estonia in the semifinal. They overcame Hungary in the small final to earn a bronze medal.

In the 2014–15 season Navarria climbed her first World Cup podium since her comeback with a silver medal in Barcelona after losing in the final to China's Xu Anqi.

== Medal record ==
=== Olympic Games ===
Year	Location	Event	Position
2021	Tokyo, Japan	Team Women's Épée	3rd

=== World Championships ===
Year	Location	Event	Position
2011	Catania, Italy	Team Women's Épée	3rd
2014	Kazan, Russia	Team Women's Épée	3rd
2018	Wuxi, China	Individual Women's Épée	1st
2019	Budapest, Hungary	Team Women's Épée	3rd
2022	Cairo, Egypt	Team Women's Épée	2nd

=== European Championship ===
Year	Location	Event	Position
2010	Leipzig, Germany	Team Women's Épée	2nd
2014	Strasbourg, France	Team Women's Épée	3rd
2015	Montreux, Switzerland	Team Women's Épée	3rd
2019	Düsseldorf, Germany	Team Women's Épée	3rd
2022	Antalya, Turkey	Individual Women's Épée	3rd
2022	Antalya, Turkey	Team Women's Épée	2nd

=== Grand Prix ===
Date	Location	Event	Position
2012-02-25	Budapest, Hungary	Individual Women's Épée	2nd
2015-12-05	Doha, Qatar	Individual Women's Épée	1st
2017-12-08	Doha, Qatar	Individual Women's Épée	2nd
2018-03-23	Budapest, Hungary	Individual Women's Épée	1st
2019-05-03	Cali, Colombia	Individual Women's Épée	2nd
2020-01-24	Doha, Qatar	Individual Women's Épée	2nd

=== World Cup ===
Date	Location	Event	Position
2012-02-11	Doha, Qatar	Individual Women's Épée	1st
2015-01-23	Barcelona, Spain	Individual Women's Épée	2nd
2016-01-22	Barcelona, Spain	Individual Women's Épée	1st
2017-10-20	Tallinn, Estonia	Individual Women's Épée	1st
