= Erek Lin =

Actor

Erek Lin (林暉閔, Lin Hui Min, born September 10, 1997) is a Taiwanese actor. Making his debut as a child actor in Starry Starry Night (2012), Lin has since gone on to star in various dramas and movies.

== Life and career ==
=== 1997-2011: Early life and Starry Starry Night (2012) ===
Lin was born in Taipei in 1997. He attended Taipei Jing-Xing Junior High School (景興國中) and New Taipei Municipal AnKang High School (新北市立安康高级中學).

Primarily an athlete, he was involved in Taekwondo throughout his early life. In the 6th grade, Lin was Taekwondo National Champion. Interested in track and basketball, his classmates initially thought that he would grow up to have a career in sports.

Coincidentally, after a street casting and after being picked among at least a thousand other individuals contesting the part, Lin was selected for the main role of Zhou Yu-Jie in Starry Starry Night (2012). Director Tom Lin Shu-yu had initially planned to create a "small art-house movie" based on the illustrated novel of the same name by illustrator and writer Jimmy Liao. Subsequently, however, after the Chinese film studio Huayi Brothers picked up the film, the film became a China-Taiwan co-production and the film's budget was increased to a total of US$7 million

Upon its release, Starry Starry Night was well-received and despite no formal experience in acting, Lin's performance in Starry Starry Night received high praise. His performance earned him a Best New Actor award at the 14th Taipei Film Awards, a nomination for Best Newcomer at the 6th Asian Film Awards, and a nomination for Best New Performer at the 49th Golden Horse Film Awards

=== 2012-2019: University ===
After Starry Starry Night, Lin only took on acting jobs in his free time and during the school holidays, making it clear that his priority would be on schooling. In this period, he took on small roles (a bit part in Mayday Nowhere 3D (2012), a dubbed role in drama 泡沫之夏 (2016)) and roles in minor productions (看不見的光影 (2012), 我的爸爸 (2012), 今天我代課 (2015)).

In 2016, Lin gained admission to Taipei National University of the Arts' (國立臺北藝術大學) Department of Film Making.

=== 2020-present: Lead roles and Return to acting ===
Starting 2018, Lin began to take on more acting roles. PTS Movie The Defenders (2018) marked his return to acting.

In July 2019, Lin held a role as a main character in PTS Movie, Fragments of Summer (2019). In the movie, he plays Duoduo, a child trafficking victim rendered mute by having his tongue cut out by traffickers. Later in August that year, Lin was announced as one of the main cast members in Season 1 of 76 Horror Bookstore (2020).

Lin also starred in the romantic film Your Name Engraved Herein (2020), the first LGBT film to exceed NT$100 million at the Taiwanese box office. There was also an Alternate Reality Game (ARG) spin-off based on Lin's character in the movie.

In December 2020, Lin starred alongside Chris Wang Yu-Sheng and Allison Lin in new HBO Asia drama, The Adventure of the Ring (2020). The drama is available for worldwide streaming on HBO Go.

Lin stars alongside veteran actors Chang Chen and Janine Chang in The Soul (2021). He will also be starring in the Eastern Broadcasting Company's Drama The Summer Temple Fair (2021), slated to be released in the summer of 2021.

== Filmography ==
=== Movies ===
Year	Title	Role
2011	Starry Starry Night	周宇傑
2012	看不見的光影	阿聰
2012	Mayday Nowhere 3D	小暉
2013	Get Together	劉國樑
2016	Summer's Desire	尹澄
2020	Your Name Engraved Herein	謝鎮宏（瘦瘦）
2021	The Soul	王天佑
2022	S-Girl	T.B.A.
T.B.A.	超級碼力 / 野夏天	T.B.A.

=== Television Movies ===
Year	Title	Role	Network
2015	今天我代課	俊華	PTS 學生劇展
2018	The Defenders	手槍（王守強）	PTS 新創電影
2019	Fragments of Summer	多多	PTS 新創電影
2020	The Silent Gun	宋家豪	PTS 人生劇展
2021	The Amazing Grace of Σ	T.B.A.	

=== Mini Series ===
Year	Title	Role	Network
2020	Kill For Love	林家勳	myVideo

=== Television series ===
Year	Title	Role	Network
2019	Sweet Encounter	胡晏誠	DaAi TV
2020	The Adventure of the Ring	賴子隆	HBO Asia
2021	The Summer Temple Fair	林一心	Eastern Broadcasting Company
2021	What The Hell Is Love	盧品冠	
2022	DNA Says Love You	喜文	

=== Short Films/Independent Films ===
Year	Title	Role	Ref.
2012	我的爸爸	多多	
2017	SWIN		Screened at the 2017 Yilan Green International Film Festival and the 40th Golden Harvest Awards for Outstanding Short Films
2019	平行時空	Himself	Kre8音樂實驗室 x 寰亞 Media Asia Global Audition 2019 Promotional Film
2020	HIDE AND SEEK	小奇	76 Horror Bookstore (2020) Season 1
2020	Make a Wish	李皓	Screened at the 42nd Golden Harvest Awards for Outstanding Short Films, the 7th Taiwan International Queer Film Festival, and the 27th Women Make Waves Film Festival
2020	Walking in the Drizzle	E	Taipei National University of the Arts' Department of Film Making's 7th Graduation Exhibition:《最後一顆都是騙人的》
2021	The Goldfish	Boy	RTF GRADUATION Exhibition
2021	少年的河	A-Hai	Tamsui River Film Festival

== Awards and nominations ==
Year	Award	Category	Nominated work	Role	Result
2012	14th Taipei Film Awards	Best New Actor	Starry Starry Night	周宇傑（小傑）	Won
2012	6th Asian Film Awards	Best New Actor	Starry Starry Night	周宇傑（小傑）	Nominated
2012	49th Golden Horse Film Festival and Awards	Best New Actor	Starry Starry Night	周宇傑（小傑）	Nominated
