= Violetta Kolobova =

Russian fencer

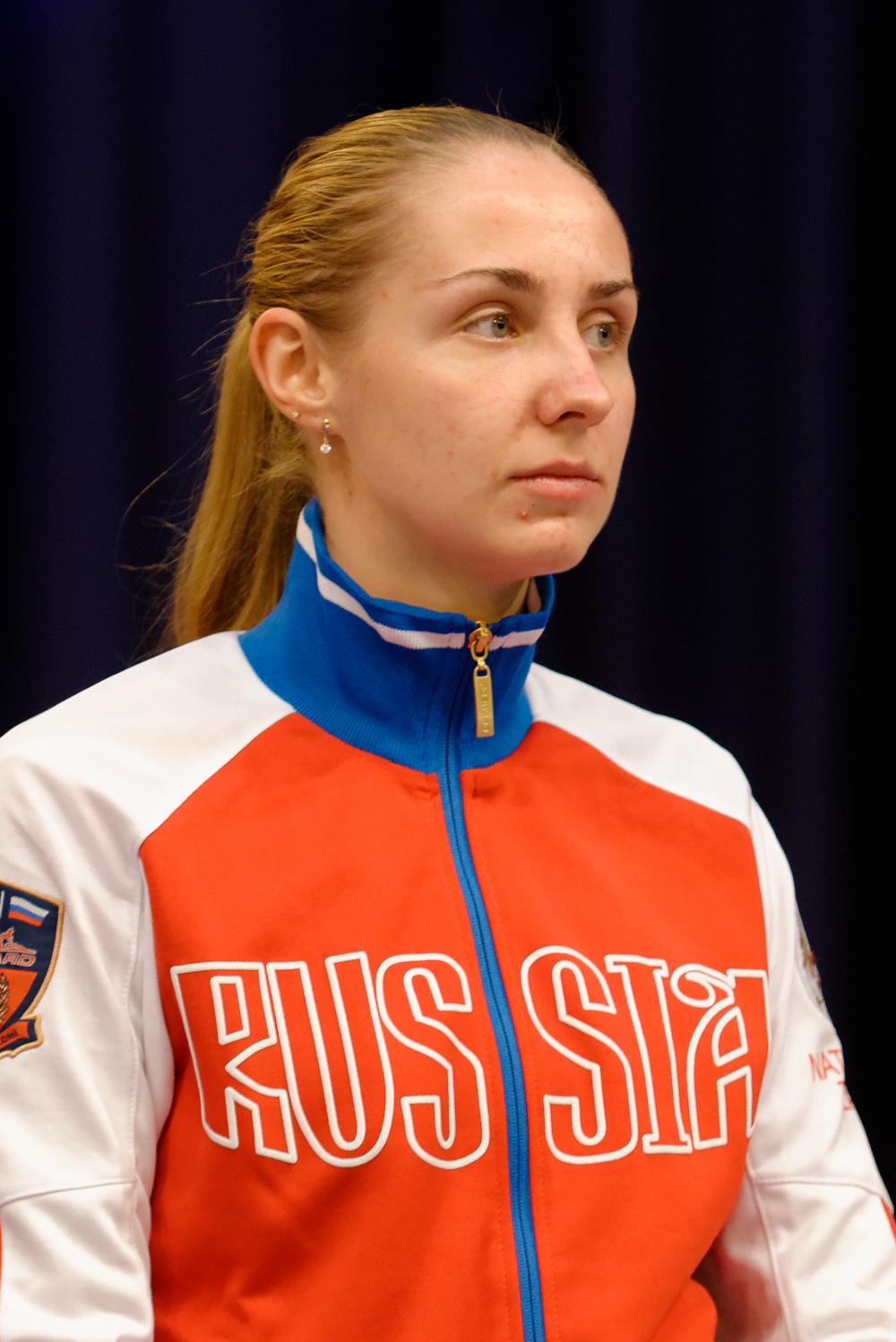
- Kolobova in 2013

Personal information
- Full name: Violetta Vitalyevna Kolobova
- Nationality: (Russia) Russian
- Born: 27 July 1991 (age 35) Dzerzhinsk, Nizhny Novgorod Oblast, RSFSR, USSR
- Height: 1.77 m (5 ft 10 in)
- Weight: 65 kg (143 lb)

Fencing career
- Sport: Fencing
- Country: Russia
- Weapon: Épée
- Hand: Right-handed
- Club: Dynamo Moscow
- FIE ranking: current ranking
Medal record
Women's épée fencing
Representing Russia
Olympic Games
| Bronze medal – third place | 2016 Rio de Janeiro | Team épée |
World Championships
| Gold medal – first place | 2013 Budapest | Team épée |
| Gold medal – first place | 2014 Kazan | Team épée |
| Silver medal – second place | 2019 Budapest | Team épée |
European Championships
| Gold medal – first place | 2012 Legnano | Team épée |
| Gold medal – first place | 2015 Montreux | Individual épée |
| Gold medal – first place | 2017 Tbilisi | Individual épée |
| Silver medal – second place | 2011 Sheffield | Team épée |
| Silver medal – second place | 2014 Strasbourg | Team épée |
| Silver medal – second place | 2017 Tbilisi | Team épée |
| Silver medal – second place | 2019 Düsseldorf | Team épée |
| Bronze medal – third place | 2018 Novi Sad | Individual épée |

Violetta Vitalyevna Kolobova (Russian: Виолетта Витальевна Колобова; born 27 July 1991) is a Russian right-handed épée fencer, 2012 team European champion, two-time individual European champion, two-time team world champion, two-time Olympian, and 2016 team Olympic bronze medalist.

== Biography ==
Kolobova took up fencing in 2001, encouraged by her mother. She married fellow Russian Olympian Roman Vlasov in 2019.

== Medal Record ==
=== Olympic Games ===
| Year | Location | Event | Position |
|---|---|---|---|
| 2016 | Rio de Janeiro, Brazil | Team Women's Épée | 3rd |

=== World Championship ===
| Year | Location | Event | Position |
|---|---|---|---|
| 2013 | Budapest, Hungary | Team Women's Épée | 1st |
| 2014 | Kazan, Russia | Team Women's Épée | 1st |
| 2019 | Budapest, Hungary | Team Women's Épée | 2nd |

=== European Championship ===
| Year | Location | Event | Position |
|---|---|---|---|
| 2011 | Sheffield, United Kingdom | Team Women's Épée | 2nd |
| 2012 | Legnano, Italy | Team Women's Épée | 1st |
| 2014 | Strasbourg, France | Team Women's Épée | 2nd |
| 2015 | Montreux, Switzerland | Individual Women's Épée | 1st |
| 2017 | (Georgia (country)) Tbilisi, Georgia | Individual Women's Épée | 1st |
| 2017 | (Georgia (country)) Tbilisi, Georgia | Team Women's Épée | 2nd |
| 2018 | Novi Sad, Serbia | Individual Women's Épée | 3rd |
| 2019 | Düsseldorf, Germany | Team Women's Épée | 2nd |

=== Grand Prix ===
| Date | Location | Event | Position |
|---|---|---|---|
| 01/15/2010 | Budapest, Hungary | Individual Women's Épée | 3rd |
| 12/09/2016 | Doha, Qatar | Individual Women's Épée | 2nd |
| 01/25/2019 | Doha, Qatar | Individual Women's Épée | 3rd |

=== World Cup ===
| Date | Location | Event | Position |
|---|---|---|---|
| 02/07/2014 | Leipzig, Germany | Individual Women's Épée | 1st |
| 05/16/2014 | Rio de Janeiro, Brazil | Individual Women's Épée | 3rd |
| 01/23/2015 | Barcelona, Spain | Individual Women's Épée | 3rd |
| 05/01/2015 | Johannesburg, South Africa | Individual Women's Épée | 2nd |
| 10/23/2015 | Legnano, Italy | Individual Women's Épée | 3rd |
| 02/12/2016 | Buenos Aires, Argentina | Individual Women's Épée | 1st |
| 10/21/2016 | Tallinn, Estonia | Individual Women's Épée | 2nd |
| 05/04/2018 | Dubai, United Arab Emirates | Individual Women's Épée | 3rd |
| 05/17/2019 | Dubai, United Arab Emirates | Individual Women's Épée | 3rd |
| 11/01/2019 | Tallinn, Estonia | Individual Women's Épée | 2nd |
