= Martyna Swatowska-Wenglarczyk =

Polish fencer (born 1994)

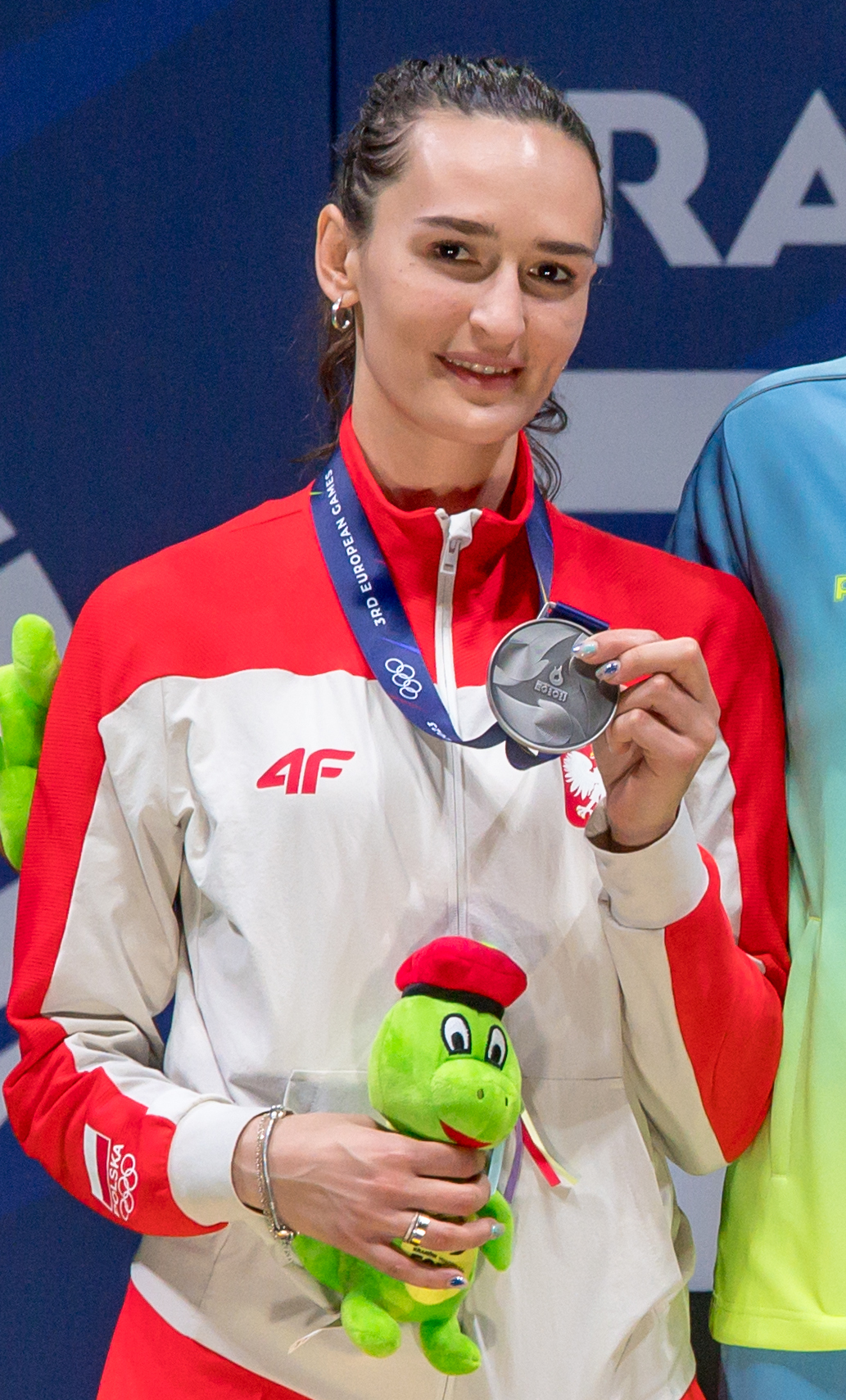
- Swatowska-Wenglarczyk in 2023

Personal information
- Nationality: Polish
- Born: 8 July 1994 (age 32) Szczecin, Poland
- Height: 1.72 m (5 ft 8 in)
- Weight: 53 kg (117 lb)

Fencing career
- Sport: Fencing
- Country: Poland
- Weapon: Épée
- Hand: Left-handed
- National coach: Bartłomiej Język
- Club: AZS AWF Katowice
- Head coach: Piotr Bortel
- Personal coach: Jan Wenglarczyk
- FIE ranking: current ranking
Medal record
Women's épée
Representing Poland
Olympic Games
Bronze medal – third place	2024 Paris	Team
World Championships
Gold medal – first place	2023 Milan	Team
Bronze medal – third place	2022 Cairo	Team
European Games
Silver medal – second place	2023 Kraków–Małopolska	Individual
European Championships
Bronze medal – third place	2022 Antalya	Individual
FISU World University Games
Bronze medal – third place	2017 Taipei	Team
Bronze medal – third place	2019 Naples	Team
Youth Olympic Games
Bronze medal – third place	2010 Singapore	Individual
Representing (International Olympic Committee) Mixed-NOCs
Youth Olympic Games
Silver medal – second place	2010 Singapore	Mixed team

Martyna Swatowska-Wenglarczyk (née Swatowska; born 8 July 1994) is a Polish épée fencer. She competed in the 2024 Summer Olympics, where she won the bronze medal in the team competition.
