= Aleksandra Jarecka =

Polish fencer (born 1995)

Personal information
- Nationality: Polish
- Born: 11 October 1995 (age 30) Kraków, Poland

Fencing career
- Sport: Fencing
- Country: Poland
- Weapon: Épée
- Hand: Right-handed
- National coach: Bartłomiej Język
- Club: AZS AWF Kraków
- Head coach: Radosław Zawrotniak
- FIE ranking: current ranking
Medal record
Women's épée
Representing Poland
Olympic Games
Bronze medal – third place	2024 Paris	Team
European Championships
Gold medal – first place	2019 Düsseldorf	Team
Silver medal – second place	2018 Novi Sad	Team
Universiade
Gold medal – first place	2017 Taipei	Individual
Bronze medal – third place	2017 Taipei	Team

Aleksandra Jarecka (née Zamachowska, born 11 October 1995) is a Polish épée fencer. She competed in the 2020 Summer Olympics, and is the 2024 Summer Olympics bronze medalist in the team competition.
