= Olena Kryvytska =

Ukrainian fencer (born 1987)

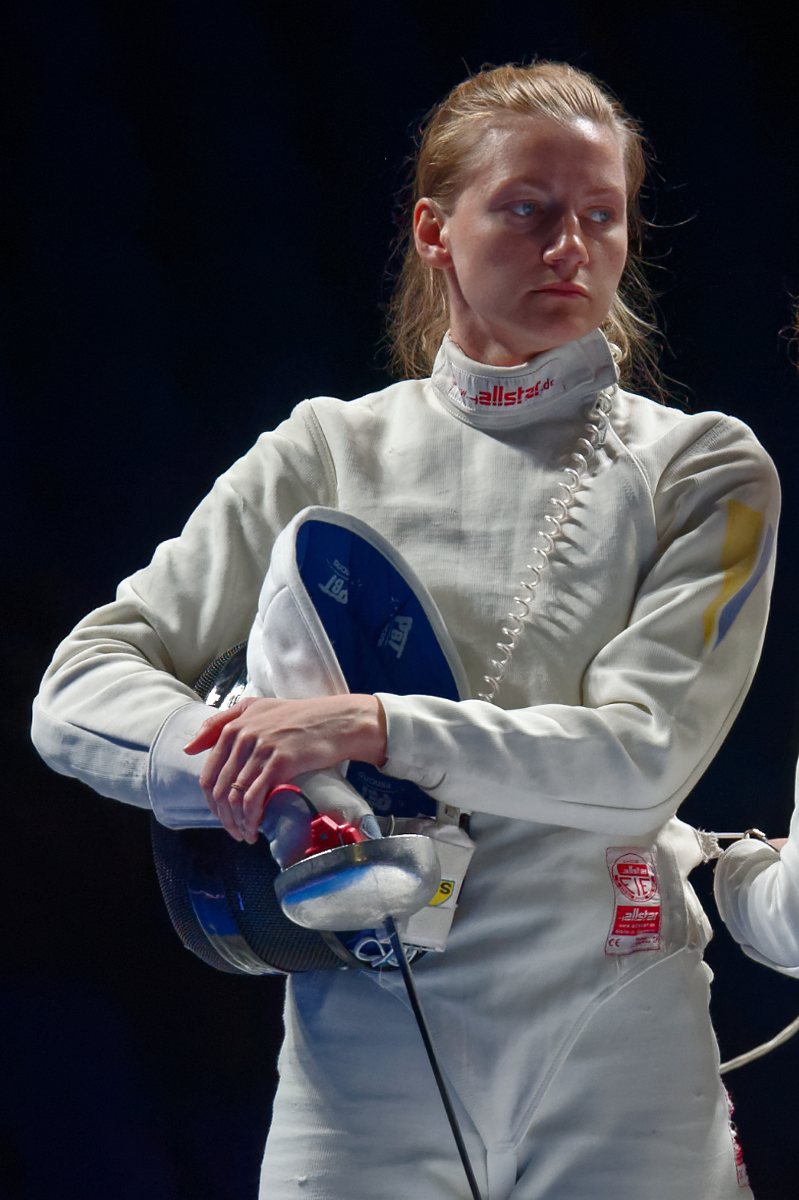
- Kryvytska in 2015

Personal information
- Full name: Olena Serhiyivna Kryvytska
- Born: 23 February 1987 (age 39) Rostov, Russian SFSR, Soviet Union
- Height: 1.73 m (5 ft 8 in)
- Weight: 59 kg (130 lb)

Fencing career
- Sport: Fencing
- Country: Ukraine
- Weapon: Épée
- Hand: Right-handed
- FIE ranking: current ranking
Medal record
Women's épée
Representing Ukraine
World Championships
Bronze medal – third place	2015 Moscow	Team épée
Bronze medal – third place	2017 Leipzig	Individual épée
Bronze medal – third place	2019 Budapest	Individual épée
European Championships
Bronze medal – third place	2026 Antony	Team épée
World Military Championships
Silver medal – second place	2025 Seville	Team épée
European Championships
Gold medal – first place	2025 Genova	Team épée
Universiade
Gold medal – first place	2009 Belgrade	Team épée
Silver medal – second place	2011 Shenzhen	Individual épée
Bronze medal – third place	2013 Kazan	Team épée
Military Games
Silver medal – second place	2019 Wuhan	Team épée

Olena Serhiivna Kryvytska (Ukrainian: Олена Сергіївна Кривицькa; born 23 February 1987) is a Ukrainian fencer.

== Career ==
Kryvytska has won three world championship bronze medals. She competed at the 2012 Summer Olympics in the Women's épée, and was defeated in the second round. She was also part of the Ukrainian women's épée team that finished in 8th place.

She originally took up fencing in Ternopil, Ukraine, having moved there from Russia in the early 1990s.

In March 2022, speaking of the 2022 Russian invasion of Ukraine, she said her fellow athletes from Russia: "need to pick a side. Too many are keeping quiet and saying nothing. That's not acceptable, because they're involved; they belong to Russia. If they have a lot of followers on Instagram, they have to speak out and say that they are on the side of peace, and that their president is doing terrible things."
