= Auriane Mallo-Breton =

French fencer (born 1993)

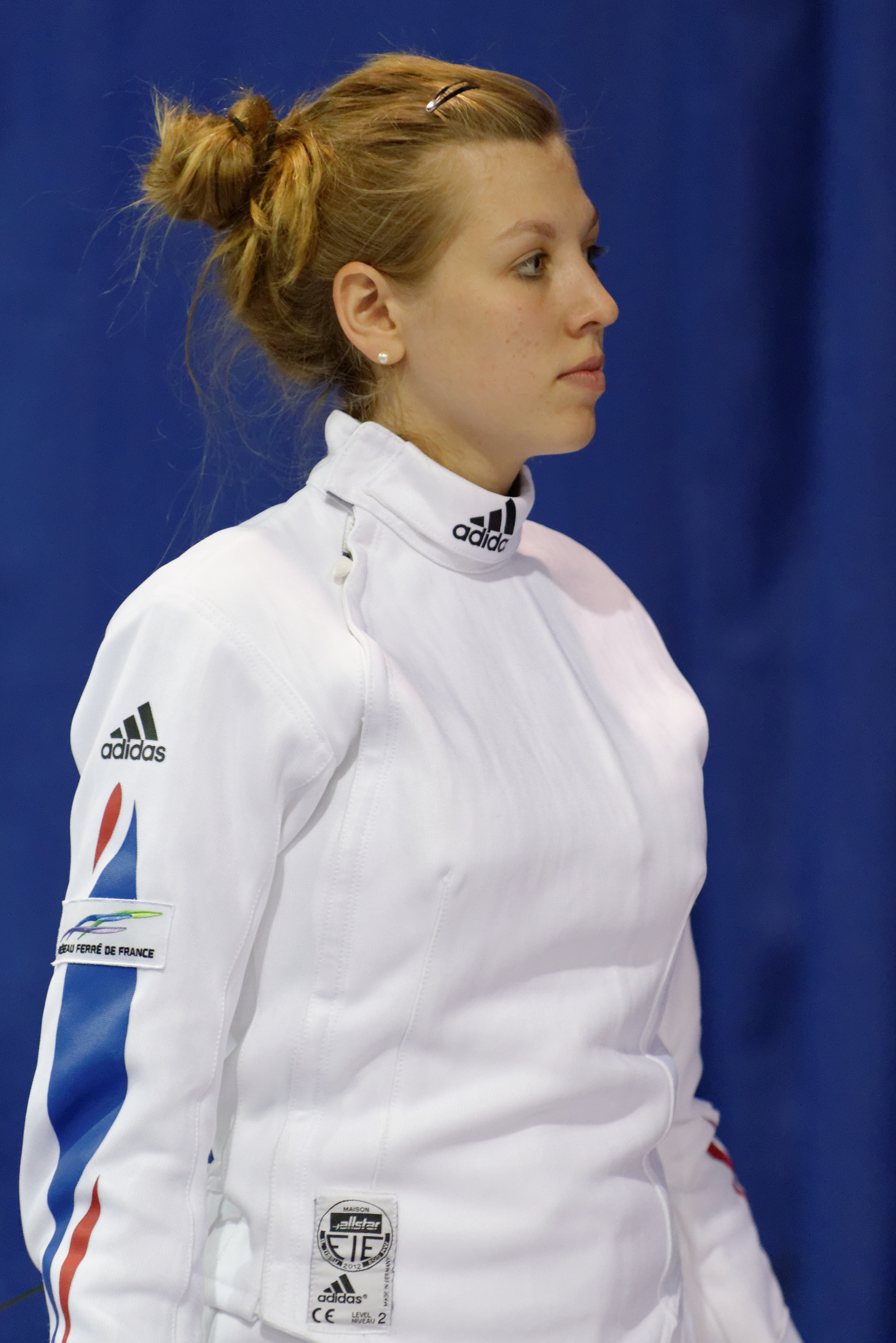
- Mallo-Breton in 2013

Personal information
- Born: 11 October 1993 (age 33) Lyon, France

Sport
- Sport: Fencing
Medal record
Women's épée
Representing France
Olympic Games
Silver medal – second place	2024 Paris	Individual
Silver medal – second place	2024 Paris	Team
European Games
Gold medal – first place	2023 Kraków–Małopolska	Team
European Championships
Gold medal – first place	2017 Tbilisi	Team
Gold medal – first place	2018 Novi Sad	Team
Gold medal – first place	2022 Antalya	Team
Gold medal – first place	2023 Kraków	Team
Gold medal – first place	2026 Antony	Team
Silver medal – second place	2016 Toruń	Team
Silver medal – second place	2024 Basel	Individual
Bronze medal – third place	2023 Plovdiv	Individual
Bronze medal – third place	2024 Basel	Team

Auriane Mallo-Breton (born 11 October 1993) is a French left-handed épée fencer. She earned two silver medals at the 2024 Summer Olympics and is a three-time team European champion.

== Medal record ==
=== Olympic Games ===
Year	Location	Event	Position
2024	Paris, France	Individual Women's Épée	2nd

=== European Championship ===
Year	Location	Event	Position
2016	Toruń, Poland	Team Women's Épée	2nd
2017	(Georgia (country)) Tbilisi, Georgia	Team Women's Épée	1st
2018	Novi Sad, Serbia	Team Women's Épée	1st
2022	Antalya, Turkey	Team Women's Épée	1st

=== Grand Prix ===
Date	Location	Event	Position
2018-05-25	Cali, Colombia	Individual Women's Épée	3rd
2022-04-29	Cairo, Egypt	Individual Women's Épée	2nd

=== World Cup ===
Date	Location	Event	Position
2019-01-11	Havana, Cuba	Individual Women's Épée	2nd
2022-02-11	Barcelona, Spain	Individual Women's Épée	3rd
