= Anfisa Pochkalova =

Ukrainian fencer (born 1990)

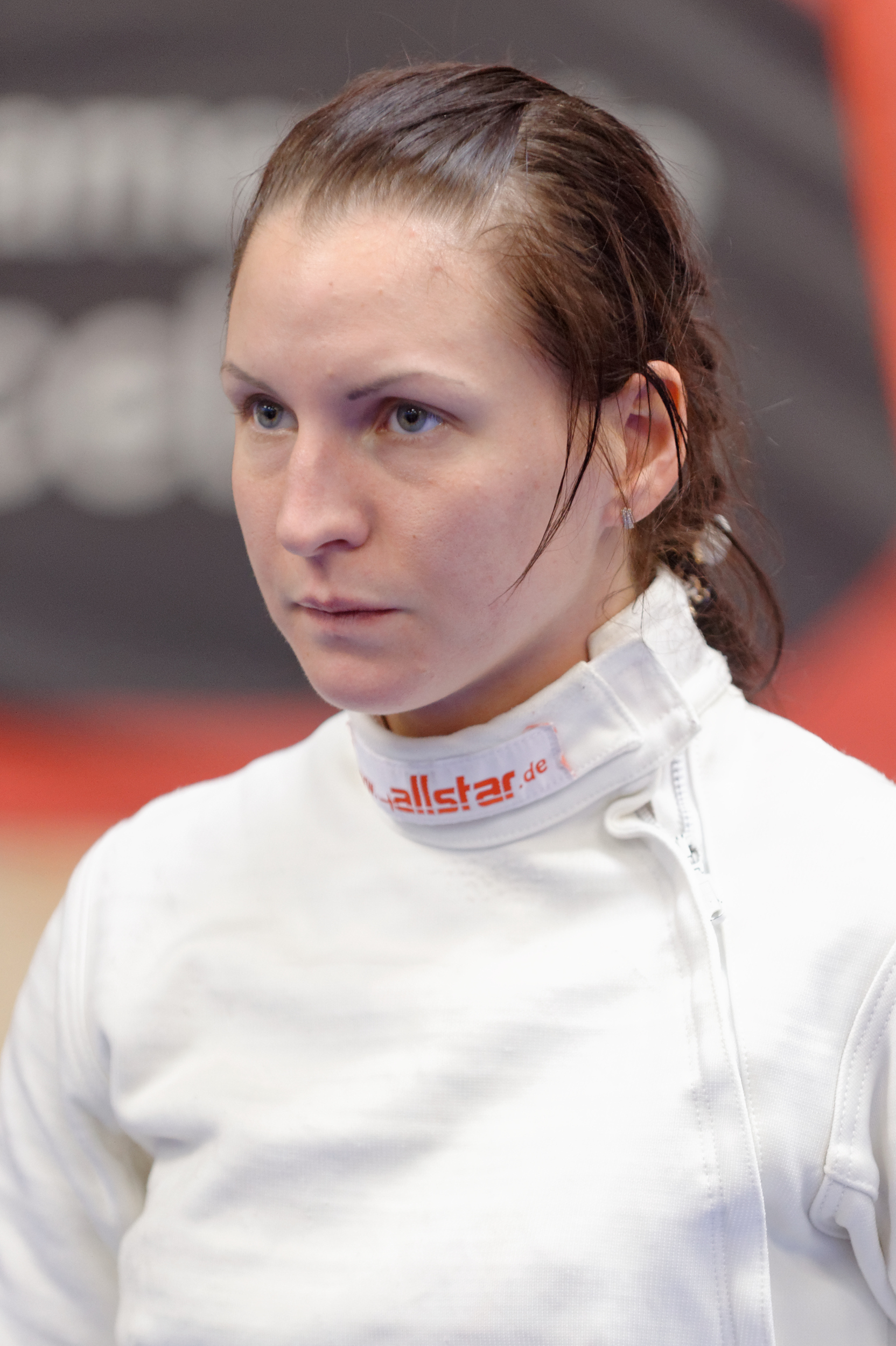
- Pochkalova in 2015

Personal information
- Full name: Anfisa Serhiyivna Pochkalova
- Born: 1 March 1990 (age 36) Lviv, Ukrainian SSR, Soviet Union
- Height: 1.78 m (5 ft 10 in)
- Weight: 69 kg (152 lb)

Fencing career
- Sport: Fencing
- Country: Ukraine
- Weapon: Épée
- Hand: Right-handed
- FIE ranking: current ranking
Medal record
World Championships
| Bronze medal – third place | 2009 Antalya | Individual épée |
| Bronze medal – third place | 2015 Moscow | Team épée |
Universiade
| Gold medal – first place | 2009 Belgrade | Team épée |
| Bronze medal – third place | 2013 Kazan | Team épée |

Anfisa Serhiyivna Pochkalova (Ukrainian: Анфіса Сергіївна Почкалова; born 1 March 1990) is a Ukrainian épée fencer. She is the 2009 world individual bronze medalist.

== Personal life ==
Pochkalova was born 1 March 1990 in Lviv. She is a student at the Lviv State University of Physical Culture.

== Career ==
Pochkalova learnt fencing in Lviv under Zoriana Savruk, then Andriy Orlykovskyi, who also trained Olympic champion Yana Shemyakina. She won in 2007 a bronze medal at the Cadet European Championships in Novi Sad and a silver medal at the Junior European Championship in Prague. She joined in 2008 the national senior team and took part in her first World championships in Beijing, where Ukraine finished 13th.

In 2009, she earned a bronze medal at the Junior World Championships in Belfast. She was part of the Ukrainian team that won the gold medal at the 2009 Summer Universiade in Belgrade. She reached the semi-final in the senior World Fencing Championships after defeating reigning Olympic champion Britta Heidemann, but fell to Russia's Lyubov Shutova and came away with a bronze medal. She finished the 2008–09 season no.1 in junior rankings and no.26 in senior rankings, a career best as of 2014.

This early success was followed by a dry spell. She took part in the 2012 Summer Olympics in London as a member of the Ukrainian team. They were largely defeated by Russia in the first round and finished last after the classification matches. In the 2012–13 season Pochkalova returned to a top 50 ranking with a table of 16 at the Xuzhou Grand Prix, a quarter-final at the European Championships and a second round at the World Championships. After a disappointing 2013–14 season, she won at Legnano her first World Cup competition after defeating Romania's Ana Maria Brânză in the final.
