= Marie-Florence Candassamy =

French fencer (born 1991)

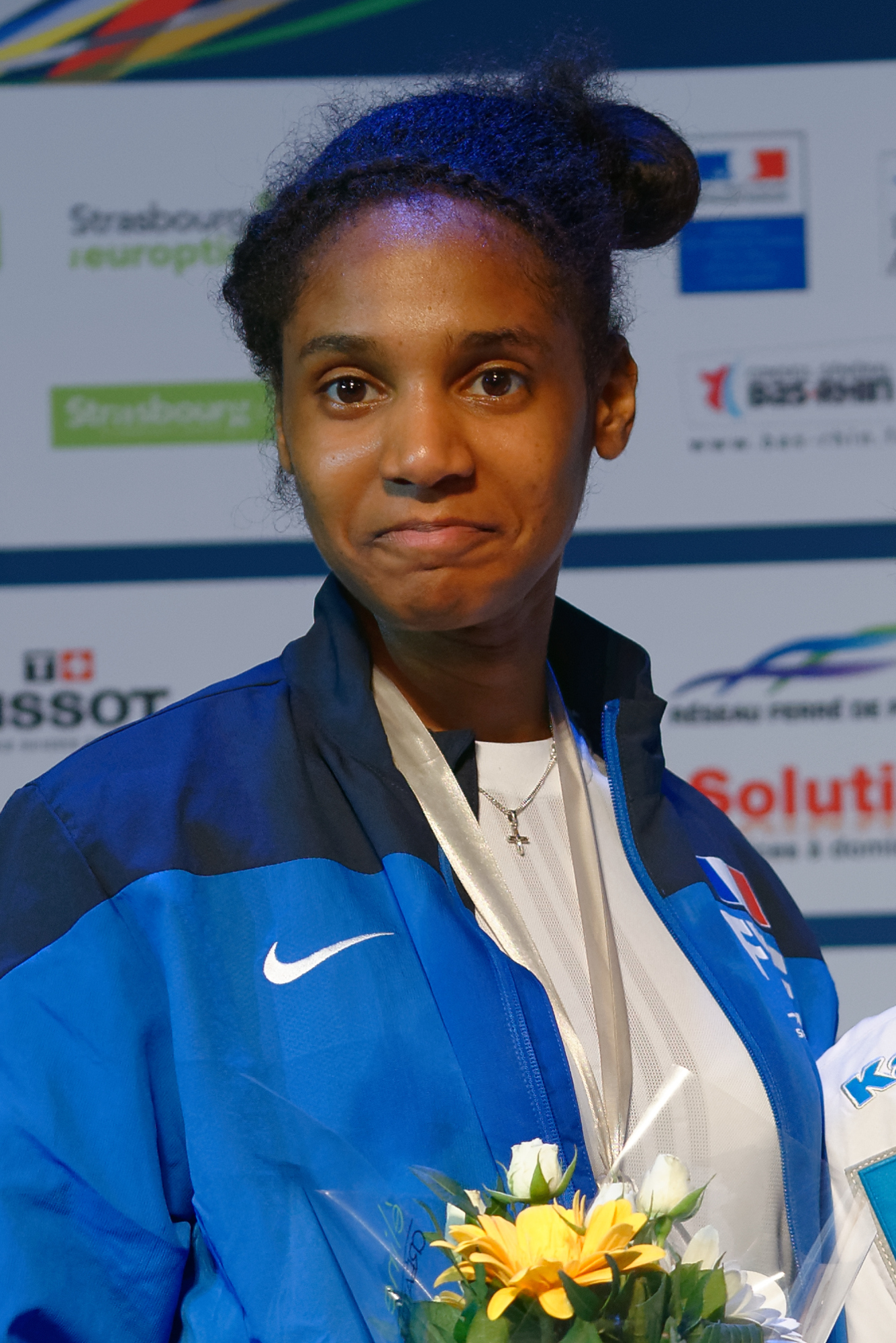
- Marie-Florence Candassamy in 2014

Personal information
- Nationality: French
- Born: 26 February 1991 (age 35) Paris, France
- Height: 1.85 m (6 ft 1 in)
- Weight: 74 kg (163 lb)

Fencing career
- Sport: Fencing
- Country: France
- Weapon: Épée
- Hand: right-handed
- National coach: Herve Faget
- Club: Paris Université Club
- FIE ranking: current ranking
Medal record
Women's épée
Representing France
Olympic Games
Silver medal – second place	2024 Paris	Team
World Championships
Gold medal – first place	2023 Milan	Individual
Gold medal – first place	2025 Tbilisi	Team
European Games
Gold medal – first place	2023 Kraków–Małopolska	Team
European Championships
Gold medal – first place	2023 Kraków	Team
Gold medal – first place	2022 Antalya	Team
Gold medal – first place	2018 Novi Sad	Team
Gold medal – first place	2026 Antony	Team
Silver medal – second place	2014 Strasbourg	Individual
Silver medal – second place	2016 Toruń	Team
Silver medal – second place	2019 Düsseldorf	Individual
Bronze medal – third place	2024 Basel	Team
Universiade
Gold medal – first place	2013 Kazan	Team
Bronze medal – third place	2013 Kazan	Individual

Marie-Florence Candassamy (born 26 February 1991) is a French right-handed épée fencer, 2023 World champion, 2022 team European champion, and 2024 Olympic silver medalist.

== Personal life ==
Candassamy was born in metropolitan France to a Martiniquais father and Guadeloupean-Indian mother.

== Medal record ==
=== Olympics ===
Year	Location	Event	Position
2024	Paris, France	Team Women's Épée	2nd

=== World Championship ===
Year	Location	Event	Position
2023	Milan, Italy	Individual Women's Épée	1st

=== European Championship ===
Year	Location	Event	Position
2015	Strasbourg, France	Individual Women's Épée	2nd
2016	Toruń, Poland	Team Women's Épée	2nd
2019	Düsseldorf, Germany	Individual Women's Épée	2nd
2022	Antalya, Turkey	Team Women's Épée	1st

=== Grand Prix ===
Date	Location	Event	Position
2014-04-26	Xuzhou, China	Individual Women's Épée	3rd
2018-03-23	Budapest, Hungary	Individual Women's Épée	3rd
2022-01-28	Doha, Qatar	Individual Women's Épée	3rd
2023-01-27	Doha, Qatar	Individual Women's Épée	2nd
2023-03-10	Budapest, Hungary	Individual Women's Épée	3rd
2023-05-06	Cali, Colombia	Individual Women's Épée	2nd
2024-03-08	Budapest, Hungary	Individual Women's Épée	3rd

=== World Cup ===
Date	Location	Event	Position
2020-01-10	Havana, Cuba	Individual Women's Épée	3rd
2021-11-19	Tallinn, Estonia	Individual Women's Épée	2nd
2022-02-11	Barcelona, Spain	Individual Women's Épée	2nd
2022-05-27	Katowice, Poland	Individual Women's Épée	3rd
2022-11-11	Tallinn, Estonia	Individual Women's Épée	2nd
