= Women's épée at the 2022 World Fencing Championships =

- Venue: Cairo Stadium Indoor Halls Complex
- Location: Cairo, Egypt
- Dates: 15 July (qualification); 18 July
- Competitors: 158 from 63 nations

Medalists
gold medal	Song Se-ra	South Korea
silver medal	Alexandra Ndolo	Germany
bronze medal	Rossella Fiamingo	Italy
bronze medal	Vivian Kong	Hong Kong

The Women's épée competition at the 2022 World Fencing Championships was held on 18 July 2022. The qualification was held on 15 July.

== Draw ==
=== Finals ===
Semifinals
(Germany) Alexandra Ndolo	15
(Italy) Rossella Fiamingo	10
(Hong Kong) Vivian Kong	9
(South Korea) Song Se-ra	14

Final
(Germany) Alexandra Ndolo	10
(South Korea) Song Se-ra	11

=== Top half ===
==== Section 1 ====
Round of 64
(South Korea) Choi In-jeong	15
(Poland) Magdalena Pawłowska	12
(Hong Kong) Kaylin Hsieh	8
(Argentina) Clara Isabel Di Tella	9
(Germany) Alexandra Ndolo	15
(Sweden) Elvira Mårtensson	9
(United States) Anna van Brummen	14
(South Korea) Kang Young-mi	15
(Poland) Renata Knapik-Miazga	15
(Romania) Greta Vereș	7
(China) Yu Sihan	8
(China) Shi Yuexin	7
(France) Joséphine Jacques-André-Coquin	15
(Switzerland) Pauline Brunner	9
(Israel) Dar Hecht	13
(Italy) Alberta Santuccio	15

Round of 32
(South Korea) Choi In-jeong	15
(Argentina) Clara Isabel Di Tella	13
(Germany) Alexandra Ndolo	15
(South Korea) Kang Young-mi	11
(Poland) Renata Knapik-Miazga	9
(China) Yu Sihan	13
(France) Joséphine Jacques-André-Coquin	15
(Italy) Alberta Santuccio	10

Round of 16
(South Korea) Choi In-jeong	9
(Germany) Alexandra Ndolo	15
(China) Yu Sihan	11
(France) Joséphine Jacques-André-Coquin	10

Quarterfinals
(Germany) Alexandra Ndolo	14
(China) Yu Sihan	13

==== Section 2 ====
Round of 64
(France) Marie-Florence Candassamy	15
(Austria) Paula Schmidl	11
(Peru) María Luisa Doig	15
(Hungary) Lili Büki	6
(Hungary) Kinga Nagy	13
(Ukraine) Yana Shemyakina	15
(Singapore) Kiria Tikanah	14
(Estonia) Nelli Differt	15
(France) Auriane Mallo	15
(Romania) Alexandra Predescu	7
(Hong Kong) Coco Lin	11
(Poland) Martyna Swatowska-Wenglarczyk	15
(Ukraine) Vlada Kharkova	15
(Japan) Nozomi Satō	14
(Dominican Republic) Violeta Ramírez	6
(Italy) Rossella Fiamingo	15

Round of 32
(France) Marie-Florence Candassamy	15
(Peru) María Luisa Doig	10
(Ukraine) Yana Shemyakina	9
(Estonia) Nelli Differt	15
(France) Auriane Mallo	15
(Poland) Martyna Swatowska-Wenglarczyk	8
(Ukraine) Vlada Kharkova	9
(Italy) Rossella Fiamingo	15

Round of 16
(France) Marie-Florence Candassamy	10
(Estonia) Nelli Differt	15
(France) Auriane Mallo	14
(Italy) Rossella Fiamingo	15

Quarterfinals
(Estonia) Nelli Differt	11
(Italy) Rossella Fiamingo	15

=== Bottom half ===
==== Section 3 ====
Round of 64
(Hungary) Anna Kun	15
(Uzbekistan) Sevara Rakhimova	7
(Lithuania) Viktė Ažukaitė	10
(China) Lin Sheng	11
(France) Lauren Rembi	15
(Sweden) Emma Fransson	11
(Egypt) Nardin Ehab	10
(Italy) Mara Navarria	15
(Estonia) Erika Kirpu	15
(Germany) Alexandra Ehler	10
(Hong Kong) Chan Wai Ling	10
(Brazil) Nathalie Moellhausen	9
(Switzerland) Angeline Favre	15
(United States) Margherita Guzzi Vincenti	9
(Spain) Sara Fernández	7
(Hong Kong) Vivian Kong	15

Round of 32
(Hungary) Anna Kun	8
(China) Lin Sheng	7
(France) Lauren Rembi	12
(Italy) Mara Navarria	14
(Estonia) Erika Kirpu	15
(Hong Kong) Chan Wai Ling	8
(Switzerland) Angeline Favre	14
(Hong Kong) Vivian Kong	15

Round of 16
(Hungary) Anna Kun	9
(Italy) Mara Navarria	14
(Estonia) Erika Kirpu	11
(Hong Kong) Vivian Kong	15

Quarterfinals
(Italy) Mara Navarria	11
(Hong Kong) Vivian Kong	12

==== Section 4 ====
Round of 64
(Italy) Federica Isola	15
(Switzerland) Noemi Moeschlin	14
(Venezuela) María Martínez	15
(Japan) Haruna Baba	14
(China) Zhu Mingye	15
(Japan) Miho Yoshimura	9
(South Korea) Lee Hye-in	9
(United States) Katharine Holmes	8
(Estonia) Irina Embrich	15
(Israel) Adele Bogdanov	7
(Czech Republic) Kateřina Saligerová	3
(Hungary) Eszter Muhari	15
(Romania) Cristina Constantinescu	8
(Ukraine) Yuliya Svystil	15
(Iran) Azam Bakhti	8
(South Korea) Song Se-ra	15

Round of 32
(Italy) Federica Isola	13
(Venezuela) María Martínez	7
(China) Zhu Mingye	8
(South Korea) Lee Hye-in	7
(Estonia) Irina Embrich	12
(Hungary) Eszter Muhari	13
(Ukraine) Yuliya Svystil	10
(South Korea) Song Se-ra	15

Round of 16
(Italy) Federica Isola	8
(China) Zhu Mingye	9
(Hungary) Eszter Muhari	9
(South Korea) Song Se-ra	15

Quarterfinals
(China) Zhu Mingye	13
(South Korea) Song Se-ra	14
