= Women's épée at the 2023 World Fencing Championships =

- Venue: Milan Convention Center
- Location: Milan, Italy
- Dates: 22 July (qualification); 25 July (final)
- Competitors: 192 from 67 nations

Medalists
gold medal	Marie-Florence Candassamy	France
silver medal	Alberta Santuccio	Italy
bronze medal	Mara Navarria	Italy
bronze medal	Sun Yiwen	China

The Women's épée competition at the 2023 World Fencing Championships was held on 25 July 2023. The qualification was held on 22 July.

== Draw ==
=== Finals ===
Semifinals
(Italy) Mara Navarria	14
(Italy) Alberta Santuccio	15
(France) Marie-Florence Candassamy	14
(China) Sun Yiwen	10

Final
(Italy) Alberta Santuccio	12
(France) Marie-Florence Candassamy	15

=== Top half ===
==== Section 1 ====
Round of 64
(Hong Kong) Vivian Kong	14
(Venezuela) María Martínez	6
(Estonia) Kristina Kuusk	10
(Hungary) Lili Buki	15
(United States) Catherine Nixon	7
(Estonia) Irina Embrich	15
(Hong Kong) Kaylin Hsieh	6
(Poland) Renata Knapik-Miazga	5
(Italy) Mara Navarria	15
(Uzbekistan) Shakhzoda Egamberdieva	6
(Sweden) Emma Fransson	12
(South Korea) Choi In-jeong	13
Iana Bekmurzova	13
(Canada) Leonora Mackinnon	15
(Canada) Xiao Ruien	7
(France) Auriane Mallo	15

Round of 32
(Hong Kong) Vivian Kong	15
(Hungary) Lili Buki	3
(Estonia) Irina Embrich	12
(Hong Kong) Kaylin Hsieh	15
(Italy) Mara Navarria	15
(South Korea) Choi In-jeong	10
(Canada) Leonora Mackinnon	11
(France) Auriane Mallo	15

Round of 16
(Hong Kong) Vivian Kong	13
(Hong Kong) Kaylin Hsieh	10
(Italy) Mara Navarria	15
(France) Auriane Mallo	13

Quarterfinals
(Hong Kong) Vivian Kong	13
(Italy) Mara Navarria	15

==== Section 2 ====
Round of 64
(Kenya) Alexandra Ndolo	15
(United Kingdom) Julia Caron	11
(China) Yu Sihan	14
(Italy) Federica Isola	13
(Israel) Dar Hecht	5
(Poland) Kamila Pytka	14
(United States Virgin Islands) Susana Fornaris	11
(France) Alexandra Louis-Marie	15
(Italy) Alberta Santuccio	15
(India) Taniksha Khatri	9
(Singapore) Kiria Tikanah	10
(Peru) María Luisa Doig	14
(Romania) Alexandra Predescu	12
(Romania) Greta Vereș	11
(Switzerland) Angela Krieger	12
(Brazil) Nathalie Moellhausen	15

Round of 32
(Kenya) Alexandra Ndolo	15
(China) Yu Sihan	7
(Poland) Kamila Pytka	8
(France) Alexandra Louis-Marie	9
(Italy) Alberta Santuccio	11
(Peru) María Luisa Doig	5
(Romania) Alexandra Predescu	11
(Brazil) Nathalie Moellhausen	14

Round of 16
(Kenya) Alexandra Ndolo	13
(France) Alexandra Louis-Marie	14
(Italy) Alberta Santuccio	10
(Brazil) Nathalie Moellhausen	9

Quarterfinals
(France) Alexandra Louis-Marie	5
(Italy) Alberta Santuccio	15

=== Bottom half ===
==== Section 3 ====
Round of 64
(France) Marie-Florence Candassamy	9
(Germany) Alexandra Ehler	8
(China) Lin Sheng	15
(Poland) Magdalena Pawłowska	9
(France) Coraline Vitalis	15
(Romania) Bianca Benea	2
(Georgia (country)) Anastasiia Spas	6
(South Korea) Kang Young-mi	15
(China) Zhu Mingye	11
(Hungary) Eszter Muhari	10
(United States) Anne Cebula	15
(Kazakhstan) Sofia Nikolaichuk	8
(Switzerland) Angeline Favre	11
(Estonia) Erika Kirpu	15
(Japan) Haruna Baba	10
(Hungary) Anna Kun	15

Round of 32
(France) Marie-Florence Candassamy	10
(China) Lin Sheng	6
(France) Coraline Vitalis	15
(South Korea) Kang Young-mi	12
(China) Zhu Mingye	12
(United States) Anne Cebula	15
(Estonia) Erika Kirpu	13
(Hungary) Anna Kun	15

Round of 16
(France) Marie-Florence Candassamy	15
(France) Coraline Vitalis	11
(United States) Anne Cebula	7
(Hungary) Anna Kun	15

Quarterfinals
(France) Marie-Florence Candassamy	14
(Hungary) Anna Kun	13

==== Section 4 ====
Round of 64
(Italy) Rossella Fiamingo	15
(Lithuania) Viktė Ažukaitė	11
(Japan) Miho Yoshimura	15
(United States) Isis Washington	12
(Georgia (country)) Maia Guchmazova	14
(South Korea) Lee Hye-in	15
(Canada) Alexanne Verret	8
(Estonia) Nelli Differt	15
(China) Sun Yiwen	15
(Paraguay) Montserrat Viveros	3
(Luxembourg) Anna Zens	8
(Belgium) Aube Vandingenen	9
(Turkey) Aleyna Ertürk	13
(Japan) Nozomi Satō	15
(Venezuela) Lizzie Asis	9
(South Korea) Song Se-ra	15

Round of 32
(Italy) Rossella Fiamingo	15
(Japan) Miho Yoshimura	9
(South Korea) Lee Hye-in	12
(Estonia) Nelli Differt	15
(China) Sun Yiwen	15
(Belgium) Aube Vandingenen	11
(Japan) Nozomi Satō	10
(South Korea) Song Se-ra	15

Round of 16
(Italy) Rossella Fiamingo	14
(Estonia) Nelli Differt	10
(China) Sun Yiwen	12
(South Korea) Song Se-ra	9

Quarterfinals
(Italy) Rossella Fiamingo	8
(China) Sun Yiwen	9
