= Women's épée at the 2025 World Fencing Championships =

- Venue: Olympic Palace
- Location: Tbilisi, Georgia
- Dates: 22 July (preliminaries); 23 July (finals)
- Competitors: 64 from 26 nations

Medalists
gold medal	Vlada Kharkova	Ukraine
silver medal	Katrina Lehis	Estonia
bronze medal	Irina Embrich	Estonia
bronze medal	Song Se-ra	South Korea

The Women's épée competition at the 2025 World Fencing Championships was held on 22 and 23 July 2025.

== Draw ==
=== Finals ===
Semifinals
(Estonia) Irina Embrich	10
(Estonia) Katrina Lehis	15
(Ukraine) Vlada Kharkova	15
(South Korea) Song Se-ra	14

Final
(Estonia) Katrina Lehis	14
(Ukraine) Vlada Kharkova	15

=== Top half ===
==== Section 1 ====
Round of 64
(Hungary) Eszter Muhari	15
Milen Khabimana	10
(Estonia) Irina Embrich	15
(Romania) Bianca Benea	8
(Poland) Alicja Klasik	15
(Poland) Gloria Klughardt	13
(Ivory Coast) Océane Tahé	10
(Kenya) Alexandra Ndolo	15
Aizanat Murtazaeva	10
(United States) Margherita Guzzi Vincenti	11
(Greece) Nefeli Rodopoulou	4
(France) Alexandra Louis-Marie	15
(Ukraine) Anna Maksymenko	15
(Egypt) Nardin Ehab	11
(Ukraine) Inna Brovko	10
(Italy) Alberta Santuccio	11

Round of 32
(Hungary) Eszter Muhari	11
(Estonia) Irina Embrich	15
(Poland) Alicja Klasik	15
(Kenya) Alexandra Ndolo	11
(United States) Margherita Guzzi Vincenti	9
(France) Alexandra Louis-Marie	8
(Ukraine) Anna Maksymenko	5
(Italy) Alberta Santuccio	5

Round of 16
(Estonia) Irina Embrich	10
(Poland) Alicja Klasik	9
(United States) Margherita Guzzi Vincenti	5
(Italy) Alberta Santuccio	15

Quarterfinals
(Estonia) Irina Embrich	15
(Italy) Alberta Santuccio	13

==== Section 2 ====
Round of 64
(Estonia) Katrina Lehis	15
(Luxembourg) Anna Zens	4
(Estonia) Julia Beljajeva	15
(Switzerland) Pauline Brunner	11
(South Korea) Lim Tae-hee	15
(Switzerland) Aurore Favre	14
(Japan) Miho Yoshimura	8
(France) Lauren Rembi	9
(Ukraine) Olena Kryvytska	10
(China) Shi Yuexin	11
(Germany) Gala Hess Sancho	10
(Italy) Rossella Fiamingo	15
Iana Bekmurzova	15
(Canada) Julia Yin	14
(Hungary) Kinga Dékány	10
(United States) Hadley Husisian	15

Round of 32
(Estonia) Katrina Lehis	13
(Estonia) Julia Beljajeva	10
(South Korea) Lim Tae-hee	12
(France) Lauren Rembi	11
(China) Shi Yuexin	9
(Italy) Rossella Fiamingo	10
Iana Bekmurzova	14
(United States) Hadley Husisian	15

Round of 16
(Estonia) Katrina Lehis	15
(South Korea) Lim Tae-hee	8
(Italy) Rossella Fiamingo	15
(United States) Hadley Husisian	11

Quarterfinals
(Estonia) Katrina Lehis	15
(Italy) Rossella Fiamingo	11

=== Bottom half ===
==== Section 3 ====
Round of 64
(Italy) Giulia Rizzi	15
(Venezuela) Lizze Asis	9
(Germany) Laura Wetzker	13
(France) Marie-Florence Candassamy	12
(France) Éloïse Vanryssel	13
(United Kingdom) Susan Maria Sica	12
(Canada) Leonora MacKinnon	13
(China) Yu Sihan	14
(Ukraine) Vlada Kharkova	15
(Switzerland) Fiona Hatz	9
(United Kingdom) Julia Caron	15
(Venezuela) Eliana Lugo	10
(United States) Tierna Oxenreider	15
(Belgium) Aube Vandingenen	7
(Hungary) Blanka Nagy	15
(Estonia) Nelli Differt	12

Round of 32
(Italy) Giulia Rizzi	13
(Germany) Laura Wetzker	14
(France) Éloïse Vanryssel	15
(China) Yu Sihan	10
(Ukraine) Vlada Kharkova	15
(United Kingdom) Julia Caron	14
(United States) Tierna Oxenreider	13
(Hungary) Blanka Nagy	15

Round of 16
(Germany) Laura Wetzker	8
(France) Éloïse Vanryssel	9
(Ukraine) Vlada Kharkova	15
(Hungary) Blanka Nagy	9

Quarterfinals
(France) Éloïse Vanryssel	14
(Ukraine) Vlada Kharkova	15

==== Section 4 ====
Round of 64
(Hong Kong) Kaylin Hsieh	15
(South Korea) Lee Hye-in	14
(Egypt) Loulwa Soliman	6
(Canada) Ruien Xiao	15
(Hungary) Tamara Gnám	9
Kristina Yasinskaya	15
(Latvia) Sofija Prošina	13
(Italy) Sara Maria Kowalczyk	15
(United States) Catherine Nixon	15
(Sweden) Elvira Mårtensson	7
(Canada) Nicole Xuan	15
(China) Tang Junyao	13
(Poland) Barbara Brych	12
(Hong Kong) Chu Ka Mong	15
(Venezuela) Clarismar Farias	6
(South Korea) Song Se-ra	15

Round of 32
(Hong Kong) Kaylin Hsieh	9
(Canada) Ruien Xiao	15
Kristina Yasinskaya	15
(Italy) Sara Maria Kowalczyk	12
(United States) Catherine Nixon	15
(Canada) Nicole Xuan	10
(Hong Kong) Chu Ka Mong	6
(South Korea) Song Se-ra	15

Round of 16
(Canada) Ruien Xiao	13
Kristina Yasinskaya	10
(United States) Catherine Nixon	11
(South Korea) Song Se-ra	13

Quarterfinals
(Canada) Ruien Xiao	11
(South Korea) Song Se-ra	15
