= Fencing at the 2020 Summer Olympics – Women's épée =

Fencing at the Olympics

Women's épée at the Games of the XXXII Olympiad
- Olympic fencing
- Venue: Makuhari Messe
- Date: 24 July 2021
- Competitors: 34 from 18 nations

Medalists
1st place, gold medalist(s)		Sun Yiwen	China
2nd place, silver medalist(s)		Ana Maria Popescu	Romania
3rd place, bronze medalist(s)		Katrina Lehis	Estonia

The women's épée event at the 2020 Summer Olympics took place on 24 July 2021 at the Makuhari Messe. 34 fencers from 18 nations competed.

The medals for the competition were presented by Giovanni Malagò, Italy; IOC Member, and the medalists' bouquets were presented by Donald Anthony Jr., United States; FIE Vice President.

== Background ==
This will be the 7th appearance of the event, which has been held at every Summer Olympics since 1996.

The reigning Olympic champion is Emese Szász of Hungary. The reigning (2019) World Champion is Nathalie Moellhausen of Brazil.

== Qualification ==
A National Olympic Committee (NOC) could enter up to 3 qualified fencers in the women's épée. Nations were limited to three fencers each from 1996 to 2004. However, the 2008 Games introduced a rotation of women's team fencing events with one weapon left off each Games; the individual event without a corresponding team event had the number of fencers per nation reduced to two. Women's épée was the first event this applied to, so each nation could enter a maximum of two fencers in the event in 2008. The 2020 Games eliminated this rotation and all weapons had team events.

There are 34 dedicated quota spots for women's épée. The first 24 spots go to the 3 members of each of the 8 qualified teams in the team épée event (China, Poland, ROC, South Korea, Hong Kong, United States, Italy, and Estonia). Next, 6 more fencers are selected from the world rankings based on continents: 2 from Europe, 1 from the Americas, 2 from Asia/Oceania, and 1 from Africa. Finally, 4 spots are allocated by continental qualifying events: 1 from Europe, 1 from the Americas, 1 from Asia/Oceania, and 1 from Africa. Each nation can earn only one spot through rankings or events.

Additionally, there are 8 host/invitational spots that can be spread throughout the various fencing events. Japan qualified one fencer through normal qualification, but used no host quota places in women's épée.

The COVID-19 pandemic delayed many of the events for qualifying for fencing, moving the close of the rankings period back to April 5, 2021 rather than the original April 4, 2020.

== Competition format ==
The 1996 tournament had vastly simplified the competition format for individual fencing competitions into a single-elimination bracket, with a bronze medal match. The 2020 tournament will continue to use that format. Fencing is done to 15 touches or to the completion of three three-minute rounds if neither fencer reaches 15 touches by then. At the end of time, the higher-scoring fencer is the winner; a tie results in an additional one-minute sudden-death time period. This sudden-death period is further modified by the selection of a draw-winner beforehand; if neither fencer scores a touch during the minute, the predetermined draw-winner wins the bout. Standard épée rules regarding target area, striking, and priority are used.

== Schedule ==
The competition is held over a single day, Saturday, 24 July. The first session runs from 9 a.m. to approximately 4:20 p.m. (when the quarterfinals are expected to conclude), after which there is a break until 6 p.m. before the semifinals and medal bouts are held. Women's épée bouts alternate with the men's sabre event bouts.

All times are Japan Standard Time (UTC+9)

Date	Time	Round
Saturday, 24 July 2021	9:00 18:00	Round of 64; Round of 32; Round of 16; Quarterfinals; Semifinals; Finals

== Results ==
=== Finals ===
Semifinals
Aizanat Murtazaeva (ROC)	8
Sun Yiwen (CHN)	12
Katrina Lehis (EST)	11
Ana Maria Popescu (ROU)	15

Final
Sun Yiwen (CHN)	11
Ana Maria Popescu (ROU)	10
Bronze medal bout
Aizanat Murtazaeva (ROC)	8
Katrina Lehis (EST)	15

=== Top half ===
==== Section 1 ====
Round of 64
Aizanat Murtazaeva (ROC)	14
Kaylin Hsieh (HKG)	7

Round of 32
Choi In-jeong (KOR)	11
Aizanat Murtazaeva (ROC)	15
Erika Kirpu (EST)	14
Kelley Hurley (USA)	15
Olena Kryvytska (UKR)	8
Renata Knapik-Miazga (POL)	15
María Luisa Doig (PER)	11
Vivian Kong (HKG)	15

Round of 16
Aizanat Murtazaeva (ROC)	12
Kelley Hurley (USA)	11
Renata Knapik-Miazga (POL)	8
Vivian Kong (HKG)	15

Quarterfinals
Aizanat Murtazaeva (ROC)	15
Vivian Kong (HKG)	10

==== Section 2 ====
Round of 64

Round of 32
Lin Sheng (CHN)	15
Ndeye Diongue (SEN)	6
Federica Isola (ITA)	14
Sarra Besbes (TUN)	12
Zhu Mingye (CHN)	15
Courtney Hurley (USA)	8
Malika Khakimova (UZB)	10
Sun Yiwen (CHN)	15

Round of 16
Lin Sheng (CHN)	9
Federica Isola (ITA)	15
Zhu Mingye (CHN)	8
Sun Yiwen (CHN)	15

Quarterfinals
Federica Isola (ITA)	10
Sun Yiwen (CHN)	11

=== Bottom half ===
==== Section 3 ====
Round of 64

Round of 32
Nathalie Moellhausen (BRA)	9
Rossella Fiamingo (ITA)	10
Aleksandra Jarecka (POL)	15
Violetta Kolobova (ROC)	11
Katrina Lehis (EST)	11
Ewa Trzebińska (POL)	10
Yulia Lichagina (ROC)	12
Mara Navarria (ITA)	15

Round of 16
Rossella Fiamingo (ITA)	15
Aleksandra Jarecka (POL)	13
Katrina Lehis (EST)	15
Mara Navarria (ITA)	10

Quarterfinals
Rossella Fiamingo (ITA)	7
Katrina Lehis (EST)	15

==== Section 4 ====
Round of 64
Coco Lin (HKG)	11
Kiria Tikanah (SGP)	15

Round of 32
Kang Young-mi (KOR)	14
Nozomi Sato (JPN)	15
Julia Beljajeva (EST)	15
Coraline Vitalis (FRA)	5
Song Se-ra (KOR)	15
Katharine Holmes (USA)	12
Kiria Tikanah (SGP)	10
Ana Maria Popescu (ROU)	15

Round of 16
Nozomi Sato (JPN)	10
Julia Beljajeva (EST)	15
Song Se-ra (KOR)	6
Ana Maria Popescu (ROU)	15

Quarterfinals
Julia Beljajeva (EST)	8
Ana Maria Popescu (ROU)	15
