= Fencing at the 2024 Summer Olympics – Women's team épée =

Women's team épée at the Games of the XXXIII Olympiad
- Olympic fencing
- Venue: Grand Palais strip
- Date: 30 July 2024
- Competitors: 32 from 8 nations
- Teams: 8

Medalists
1st place, gold medalist(s)		Rossella Fiamingo; Giulia Rizzi; Mara Navarria; Alberta Santuccio	Italy
2nd place, silver medalist(s)		Coraline Vitalis; Marie-Florence Candassamy; Alexandra Louis-Marie; Auriane Mallo	France
3rd place, bronze medalist(s)		Alicja Klasik; Renata Knapik-Miazga; Aleksandra Jarecka; Martyna Swatowska-Wenglarczyk	Poland

The women's team épée event at the 2024 Summer Olympics took place the 30th of July at the Grand Palais strip. 24 fencers (eight teams of three) from eight nations are expected to compete.

== Background ==
This was the 6th appearance of the event, which has been held at every Summer Olympics since 1996 except 2008 (during the time when team events were rotated off the schedule, with only two of the three weapons for each of the men's and women's categories).

Estonia were defending champions, but they did not qualify.

== Qualification ==
A National Olympic Committee (NOC) could enter a team of three fencers in the women's team épée. These fencers also automatically qualified for the individual event.

== Competition format ==
The tournament was a single-elimination tournament, with classification matches for all places. Each match featured the three fencers on each team competing in a round-robin, with nine three-minute bouts to five points; the winning team was the one that reaches 45 total points first or was leading after the end of the nine bouts.

== Schedule ==
The competition was held over a single day.

All times are Central European Summer Time (UTC+2)

Date	Time	Round
Tuesday, 30 July 2024	14:20; 16:40; 17:30; 17:30; 20:20; 21:20	Quarterfinals; Semifinals; Classification 7/8; Classification 5/6; Bronze medal match Gold medal match

== Results ==
Quarter-finals
Italy	39
Egypt	26
China	45
Ukraine	41
Poland	31
United States	29
France	37
South Korea	31

Semi-finals
Italy	45
China	24
Poland	39
France	45

Final
Italy	30
France	29
Bronze medal bout
Poland	32
China	31

5–8th place classification

5–8th place semifinals
Ukraine	45
Egypt	24
South Korea	45
United States	39

Fifth place bout
Ukraine	38
South Korea	45
Seventh place bout
Egypt	30
United States	44

== Final classification ==
Rank	Team	Athletes
1st place, gold medalist(s)	Italy	Mara Navarria; Giulia Rizzi; Alberta Santuccio; Rossella Fiamingo
2nd place, silver medalist(s)	France	Alexandra Louis-Marie; Auriane Mallo; Coraline Vitalis; Marie-Florence Candassamy
3rd place, bronze medalist(s)	Poland	Aleksandra Jarecka; Alicja Klasik; Renata Knapik-Miazga; Martyna Swatowska-Wenglarczyk
4	China	Sun Yiwen; Tang Junyao; Xu Nuo; Yu Sihan
5	South Korea	Kang Young-mi; Lee Hye-in; Song Se-ra; Choi In-jeong
6	Ukraine	Dzhoan Feybi Bezhura; Vlada Kharkova; Olena Kryvytska; Darya Varfolomeyeva
7	United States	Anne Cebula; Margherita Guzzi Vincenti; Hadley Husisian; Katharine Holmes
8	Egypt	Nardin Ehab; Shirwit Gaber; Aya Hussein; Loulwa Soliman
