= Fencing at the 2020 Summer Olympics – Women's team épée =

Fencing at the Olympics

Women's team épée at the Games of the XXXII Olympiad
- Olympic fencing
- Venue: Makuhari Messe
- Date: 27 July 2021
- Competitors: 32 from 8 nations

Medalists
1st place, gold medalist(s)		Julia Beljajeva; Irina Embrich; Erika Kirpu; Katrina Lehis	Estonia
2nd place, silver medalist(s)		Choi In-jeong; Kang Young-mi; Lee Hye-in; Song Se-ra	South Korea
3rd place, bronze medalist(s)		Rossella Fiamingo; Federica Isola; Mara Navarria; Alberta Santuccio	Italy

The women's team épée event at the 2020 Summer Olympics took place on 27 July 2021 at the Makuhari Messe. 24 fencers (8 teams of 3) from 8 nations competed.

== Background ==
This was the 6th appearance of the event, which has been held at every Summer Olympics since 1996 except 2008 (during the time when team events were rotated off the schedule, with only two of the three weapons for each of the men's and women's categories).

The reigning Olympic champion is Romania (Loredana Dinu, Simona Gherman, Simona Pop, and Ana Maria Popescu). The reigning World Champion is China (Lin Sheng, Sun Yiwen, Xu Anqi, and Zhu Mingye).

== Qualification ==
A National Olympic Committee (NOC) could enter a team of 3 fencers in the women's team épée. These fencers also automatically qualified for the individual event.

There are 8 dedicated quota spots for women's team épée. They are allocated as through the world team ranking list of 5 April 2021. The top 4 spots, regardless of geographic zone, qualify (China, Poland, ROC, and South Korea). The next four spots are allocated to separate geographic zones, as long as an NOC from that zone is in the top 16. These places went to Hong Kong (Asia/Oceania), the United States (Americas), and Italy (Europe); no team from Africa was in the top 16, so the place was reallocated to the next-best team regardless of zone: Estonia.

Additionally, there are 8 host/invitational spots that can be spread throughout the various fencing events. Japan qualified one women's épée fencer through normal individual qualification, but did not use host quota places to complete a women's épée team.

The COVID-19 pandemic delayed many of the events for qualifying for fencing, moving the close of the rankings period back to April 5, 2021 rather than the original April 4, 2020.

== Competition format ==
The 2020 tournament is a single-elimination tournament, with classification matches for all places. Each match features the three fencers on each team competing in a round-robin, with 9 three-minute bouts to 5 points; the winning team is the one that reaches 45 total points first or is leading after the end of the nine bouts. Standard épée rules regarding target area, striking, and priority are used.

== Schedule ==
The competition is held over a single day, Tuesday, 27 July. The first session runs from 11:25 a.m. to approximately 3:20 p.m. (when all matches except the bronze and gold medal finals are expected to conclude), after which there is a break until 6:30 p.m. before the medal bouts are held.

All times are Japan Standard Time (UTC+9)

Date	Time	Round
Tuesday, 27 July 2021	11:25 18:30	Quarterfinals; Semifinals; Classification 7/8; Classification 5/6; Bronze medal match Gold medal match

== Results ==
Quarter-finals
China	44
Hong Kong	32
United States	33
South Korea	38
ROC	31
Italy	33
Estonia	29
Poland	26

Semi-finals
China	29
South Korea	38
Italy	34
Estonia	42

Final
South Korea	32
Estonia	36
Bronze medal bout
China	21
Italy	23

5–8th place classification

5–8th place semifinals
Hong Kong	31
United States	42
ROC	25
Poland	31

Fifth place bout
United States	33
Poland	26
Seventh place bout
Hong Kong	28
ROC	27

== Final classification ==
Rank	Team	Athlete
1st place, gold medalist(s)	Estonia	Julia Beljajeva; Irina Embrich; Erika Kirpu; Katrina Lehis
2nd place, silver medalist(s)	South Korea	Choi In-jeong; Kang Young-mi; Lee Hye-in; Song Se-ra
3rd place, bronze medalist(s)	Italy	Rossella Fiamingo; Federica Isola; Mara Navarria; Alberta Santuccio
4	China	Zhu Mingye; Xu Anqi; Lin Sheng; Sun Yiwen
5	United States	Anna van Brummen; Katharine Holmes; Kelley Hurley; Courtney Hurley
6	Poland	Ewa Trzebińska; Magdalena Piekarska; Aleksandra Jarecka; Renata Knapik-Miazga
7	Hong Kong	Kaylin Hsieh; Vivian Kong; Coco Lin; Chu Ka Mong
8	ROC	Yulia Lichagina; Violetta Khrapina; Aizanat Murtazaeva; Violetta Kolobova
