= Fencing at the 2018 Asian Games – Women's team épée =

Women's team épée at the 2018 Asian Games
- Venue: Jakarta Convention Center
- Date: 24 August 2018
- Competitors: 43 from 11 nations

Medalists
gold medal	China; Lin Sheng, Sun Yiwen, Xu Chengzi, Zhu Mingye
silver medal	South Korea; Choi In-jeong, Kang Young-mi, Lee Hye-in, Shin A-lam
bronze medal	Japan; Haruna Baba, Shiori Komata, Kanna Oishi, Ayumi Yamada
bronze medal	Hong Kong; Chu Ka Mong, Kaylin Hsieh, Vivian Kong, Coco Lin

The women's team épée competition at the 2018 Asian Games in Jakarta was held on 24 August at the Jakarta Convention Center. China team emerged as the champion in this event after beat South Korea with the score 29–28 in the final. This edition, made the China team has collected five gold medals throughout the women's team épée event at the Asian Games. The silver medal captured by South Korean team, and the bronze medals goes to Hong Kong and Japan team.

== Schedule ==
All times are Western Indonesia Time (UTC+07:00)

Date	Time	Event
Friday, 24 August 2018	09:00	Round of 16
Friday, 24 August 2018	11:00	Quarterfinals
Friday, 24 August 2018	13:30	Semifinals
Friday, 24 August 2018	18:00	Gold medal match

== Seeding ==
The teams were seeded taking into account the results achieved by competitors representing each team in the individual event.

Rank	Team	Fencer		Total
Rank	Team	1	2	Total
1	South Korea (KOR)	1	3	4
2	Hong Kong (HKG)	3	5	8
3	China (CHN)	2	9	11
4	Japan (JPN)	6	8	14
5	Singapore (SGP)	10	13	23
6	India (IND)	7	22	29
7	Kazakhstan (KAZ)	14	15	29
8	Lebanon (LBN)	17	19	36
9	Vietnam (VIE)	16	21	37
10	Mongolia (MGL)	20	23	43
11	Indonesia (INA)	27	29	56

== Results ==
Round of 16
9	Vietnam	45
8	Lebanon	23
11	Indonesia	24
6	India	45
7	Kazakhstan	45
10	Mongolia	25

Quarterfinals
1	South Korea	45
9	Vietnam	28
5	Singapore	38
4	Japan	45
3	China	45
6	India	25
7	Kazakhstan	26
2	Hong Kong	45

Semifinals
1	South Korea	45
4	Japan	33
3	China	45
2	Hong Kong	34

Gold medal match
1	South Korea	28
3	China	29

== Final standing ==
Rank	Team
1st place, gold medalist(s)	China (CHN); Lin Sheng; Sun Yiwen; Xu Chengzi; Zhu Mingye
2nd place, silver medalist(s)	South Korea (KOR); Choi In-jeong; Kang Young-mi; Lee Hye-in; Shin A-lam
3rd place, bronze medalist(s)	Japan (JPN); Haruna Baba; Shiori Komata; Kanna Oishi; Ayumi Yamada
3rd place, bronze medalist(s)	Hong Kong (HKG); Chu Ka Mong; Kaylin Hsieh; Vivian Kong; Coco Lin
5	Singapore (SGP); Cheryl Lim; Elizabeth Lim; Victoria Lim; Kiria Tikanah
6	India (IND); Ena Arora; Thoudam Kabita Devi; Jyotika Dutta; Jas Seerat Singh
7	Kazakhstan (KAZ); Assel Alibekova; Ulyana Balaganskaya; Tamila Muridova; Jamilya Yunusbayeva
8	Vietnam (VIE); Nguyễn Phương Kim; Nguyễn Thị Như Hoa; Nguyễn Thị Quyên; Trần Thị Thùy Trinh
9	Lebanon (LBN); Rita Abou Jaoude; Nai Salameh; Dominique Tannous
10	Mongolia (MGL); Batsaikhany Amarzayaa; Baatarchuluuny Gerelmaa; Ganboldyn Khaliunaa; Monkhoryn Nyamjargal
11	Indonesia (INA); Aisyah Elizabeth; Megawati; Anis Rohadatul Niehlah Riyati; Sutrisni
