= Fencing at the 2018 Summer Youth Olympics – Girls' épée =

Girls' épée at the III Summer Youth Olympic Games
- Venue: Africa Pavilion
- Dates: 8 October
- Competitors: 14 from 14 nations

Medalists
1st place, gold medalist(s)		Kateryna Chorniy	Ukraine
2nd place, silver medalist(s)		Kaylin Hsieh	Hong Kong
3rd place, bronze medalist(s)		Veronika Bieleszová	Czech Republic

The girls' épée competition at the 2018 Summer Youth Olympics was held at the Africa Pavilion in Argentina on 8 October.

== Results ==
=== Pool Round ===
==== Pool 1 ====
Rank	Athlete	(Egypt)	(Czech Republic)	(Belgium)	(Ukraine)	(South Korea)	(Hong Kong)	(Costa Rica)	V#	B#	Ind.	HG	HR	Diff.
7	Mariam Amer (EGY)		1	2	1	1	1	V	1	6	0.167	11	28	−17
1	Veronika Bieleszová (CZE)	V		V	V	2	V	V	5	6	0.833	27	22	+5
3	Axelle Wasiak (BEL)	V	4		4	V	V	V	4	6	0.667	28	21	+7
2	Kateryna Chorniy (UKR)	V	4	V		V	V	3	4	6	0.667	27	18	+9
5	Lim Tae-hee (KOR)	V	V	3	1		1	3	2	6	0.333	18	20	−2
4	Kaylin Hsieh (HKG)	V	4	4	2	V2		V	3	6	0.500	22	19	+3
6	Karina Dyner (CRC)	3	4	2	V	V	2		2	6	0.333	21	26	−5

==== Pool 2 ====
Rank	Athlete	(Hungary)	(Russia)	(Canada)	(Algeria)	(United States)	(Lebanon)	(Kazakhstan)	V#	B#	Ind.	HG	HR	Diff.
3	Kinga Dékány (HUN)		V	4	V	4	V	V	4	6	0.667	28	22	+6
4	Iana Bekmurzova (RUS)	4		3	V	V	V	V	4	6	0.667	27	22	+5
2	Ariane Léonard (CAN)	V	V		4	3	V	V	4	6	0.667	27	20	+7
5	Yousra Zeboudj (ALG)	3	3	V		2	V	V	3	6	0.500	23	26	−3
1	Emily Vermeule (USA)	V	3	V	V		V	V	5	6	0.833	28	16	+12
6	Marie-Joe Abou Jaoudé (LBN)	2	2	2	3	0		V	1	6	0.167	14	28	−14
7	Tamila Muridova (KAZ)	1	4	1	4	2	3		0	6	0.000	17	30	−13

=== Bracket ===
Round of 16
1
16
9	Yousra Zeboudj (ALG)	9
8	Kaylin Hsieh (HKG)	15
5	Ariane Léonard (CAN)	15
12	Marie-Joe Abou Jaoudé (LBN)	6
13	Mariam Amer (EGY)	10
4	Axelle Wasiak (BEL)	15
3	Kateryna Chorniy (UKR)	15
14	Tamila Muridova (KAZ)	10
11	Karina Dyner (CRC)	10
6	Kinga Dékány (HUN)	15
7	Iana Bekmurzova (RUS)	8
10	Lim Tae-hee (KOR)	15
15
2

Quarterfinals
1	Emily Vermeule (USA)	14
8	Kaylin Hsieh (HKG)	15
5	Ariane Léonard (CAN)	12
4	Axelle Wasiak (BEL)	15
3	Kateryna Chorniy (UKR)	14
6	Kinga Dékány (HUN)	13
10	Lim Tae-hee (KOR)	6
2	Veronika Bieleszová (CZE)	15

Semifinals
8	Kaylin Hsieh (HKG)	15
4	Axelle Wasiak (BEL)	4
3	Kateryna Chorniy (UKR)	15
2	Veronika Bieleszová (CZE)	11

Final
8	Kaylin Hsieh (HKG)	9
3	Kateryna Chorniy (UKR)	11
Third place
4	Axelle Wasiak (BEL)	8
2	Veronika Bieleszová (CZE)	9

== Final standings ==
Rank	Athlete
1st place, gold medalist(s)	Kateryna Chorniy (UKR)
2nd place, silver medalist(s)	Kaylin Hsieh (HKG)
3rd place, bronze medalist(s)	Veronika Bieleszová (CZE)
4	Axelle Wasiak (BEL)
5	Emily Vermeule (USA)
6	Ariane Léonard (CAN)
7	Kinga Dékány (HUN)
8	Lim Tae-hee (KOR)
9	Iana Bekmurzova (RUS)
10	Yousra Zeboudj (ALG)
11	Karina Dyner (CRC)
12	Marie-Joe Abou Jaoudé (LBN)
13	Mariam Amer (EGY)
14	Tamila Muridova (KAZ)
