= Fencing at the 2023 European Games – Women's team épée =

Women's team épée at the 2023 European Games
- Venue: Tauron Arena Kraków
- Location: Kraków, Poland
- Date: 29 June
- Competitors: 73 from 19 nations
- Teams: 19

Medalists
gold medal	Marie-Florence Candassamy; Alexandra Louis-Marie; Auriane Mallo-Breton; Coraline Vitalis	France
silver medal	Lili Büki; Anna Kun; Eszter Muhari; Dorina Wimmer	Hungary
bronze medal	Rossella Fiamingo; Federica Isola; Mara Navarria; Alberta Santuccio	Italy

The women's team épée competition at the 2023 European Games in Kraków was held on 29 June 2023.

== Results ==
=== Main bracket ===
Round of 32
Lithuania	45
Belgium	35
Greece	30
Finland	45
Serbia	12
Georgia	17

Round of 16
France	45
Lithuania	17
Romania	37
Israel	45
Switzerland	45
Sweden	28
Czech Republic	19
Ukraine	45
Poland	43
Finland	28
Spain	35
Hungary	38
Estonia	31
Germany	30
Georgia	28
Italy	43

Quarterfinals
France	45
Israel	36
Switzerland	45
Ukraine	42
Poland	39
Hungary	45
Estonia	32
Italy	43

Semifinals
France	45
Switzerland	32
Hungary	38
Italy	31

Final
France	34
Hungary	33
Third place
Switzerland	33
Italy	37

=== 5–8th place bracket ===
5–8th place semifinals
Israel	34
Ukraine	45
Poland	34
Estonia	35

Fifth place
Ukraine	32
Azerbaijan	31
Seventh place
Israel	37
Poland	45

=== 9–16th place bracket ===
9–16th place quarterfinals
Lithuania	36
Romania	45
Sweden	43
Czech Republic	30
Finland	34
Spain	45
Germany	43
Georgia	45

9–12th place semifinals
Romania	45
Sweden	39
Spain	30
Georgia	45

Ninth place
Romania	39
Georgia	39
Eleventh place
Sweden	36
Spain	45

=== 13–16th place bracket ===
13–16th place semifinals
Lithuania	36
Czech Republic	45
Finland	32
Germany	45

13th place
Czech Republic	32
Germany	45
15th place
Lithuania	33
Finland	45

== Final ranking ==
Rank	Team	Rank	Team	Rank	Team	Rank	Team
1st place, gold medalist(s)	France; Marie-Florence Candassamy; Alexandra Louis-Marie; Auriane Mallo-Breton; Coraline Vitalis	6	Estonia; Julia Beljajeva; Nelli Differt; Irina Embrich; Katrina Lehis	11	Spain; Sofía Cisneros; Sara Fernández; Inés García; María Mateos	16	Lithuania; Viktė Ažukaitė; Paulina Bajorūnaitė-Stauskė; Lurdė Grabovskytė; Olivija Mašalo
2nd place, silver medalist(s)	Hungary; Lili Büki; Anna Kun; Eszter Muhari; Dorina Wimmer	7	Poland; Renata Knapik-Miazga; Magdalena Pawłowska; Kamila Pytka; Martyna Swatowska-Wenglarczyk	12	Sweden; Sophie Engdahl; Emma Fransson; Elvira Mårtensson; Emelie Mumm	17	Belgium; Solane Beken; Anne Bultynck; Aube Vandingenen
3rd place, bronze medalist(s)	Italy; Rossella Fiamingo; Federica Isola; Mara Navarria; Alberta Santuccio	8	Israel; Adele Bogdanov; Yana Botvinnik; Nicole Feygin; Sophia Vainberg	13	Germany; Alexandra Ehler; Lara Goldmann; Ricarda Multerer; Laura Wetzker	18	Serbia; Jana Grijak; Marta Grijak; Katarina Knežević; Anđela Miličić
4	Switzerland; Pauline Brunner; Angeline Favre; Aurore Favre; Noemi Moeschlin	9	Georgia; Maia Guchmazova; Arina Korneeva; Tamila Muridova; Anastasiia Spas	14	Czech Republic; Gabriela Aigermanová; Veronika Bieleszová; Patricie Prokšíková; Kateřina Saligerová	19	Greece; Nikoletta Chatzisarantou; Nefeli Rodopoulou; Andriana Theodoropoulou; Fani Varveri
5	Ukraine; Dzhoan Bezhura; Inna Brovko; Vlada Kharkova; Olena Kryvytska	10	Romania; Bianca Benea; Mihaela Leonte; Alexandra Predescu; Greta Vereș	15	Finland; Outi Jaakkola; Suvi Lehtonen; Anna Salminen; Anna Vuorinen		
