= Fencing at the 2018 Asian Games – Women's individual épée =

Women's individual épée at the 2018 Asian Games
- Venue: Jakarta Convention Center
- Date: 21 August 2018
- Competitors: 30 from 17 nations

Medalists
gold medal	Kang Young-mi	South Korea
silver medal	Sun Yiwen	China
bronze medal	Choi In-jeong	South Korea
bronze medal	Vivian Kong	Hong Kong

The women's individual épée competition at the 2018 Asian Games in Jakarta took held on 21 August at the Jakarta Convention Center.

== Schedule ==
All times are Western Indonesia Time (UTC+07:00)

Date	Time	Event
Tuesday, 21 August 2018	09:00	Preliminaries
Tuesday, 21 August 2018	12:15	Round of 32
Tuesday, 21 August 2018	14:15	Round of 16
Tuesday, 21 August 2018	16:15	Quarterfinals
Tuesday, 21 August 2018	18:00	Semifinals
Tuesday, 21 August 2018	20:00	Gold medal match

== Results ==
=== Preliminaries ===
==== Pool A ====
Athlete	CHN	SGP	KAZ	KGZ	MAS	INA
Sun Yiwen (CHN)	—	5–0	5–1	5–0	5–3	5–2
Cheryl Lim (SGP)	0–5	—	5–4	5–2	5–2	4–2
Assel Alibekova (KAZ)	1–5	4–5	—	4–5	5–3	5–1
Kamilia Abdyl-Khamitova (KGZ)	0–5	2–5	5–4	—	5–3	5–2
Goh Bee Hooi (MAS)	3–5	2–5	3–5	3–5	—	5–2
Anis Rohadatul Niehlah Riyati (INA)	2–5	2–4	1–5	2–5	2–5	—

==== Pool B ====
Athlete	KOR	JPN	VIE	IND	INA	LBN
Kang Young-mi (KOR)	—	4–3	5–2	5–2	5–4	5–2
Kanna Oishi (JPN)	3–4	—	5–2	5–1	5–2	5–4
Trần Thị Thùy Trinh (VIE)	2–5	2–5	—	4–5	5–3	5–3
Jas Seerat Singh (IND)	2–5	1–5	5–4	—	5–3	1–5
Megawati (INA)	4–5	2–5	3–5	3–5	—	4–5
Nai Salameh (LBN)	2–5	4–5	3–5	5–1	5–4	—

==== Pool C ====
Athlete	KOR	KAZ	IND	PHI	MGL	LBN
Choi In-jeong (KOR)	—	5–2	5–3	5–4	3–5	3–5
Ulyana Balaganskaya (KAZ)	2–5	—	3–5	4–5	5–2	5–4
Jyotika Dutta (IND)	3–5	5–3	—	5–1	5–3	5–2
Hanniel Abella (PHI)	4–5	5–4	1–5	—	1–5	3–5
Baatarchuluuny Gerelmaa (MGL)	5–3	2–5	3–5	5–1	—	2–5
Dominique Tannous (LBN)	5–3	4–5	2–5	5–3	5–2	—

==== Pool D ====
Athlete	HKG	JPN	VIE	THA	MGL	QAT
Vivian Kong (HKG)	—	5–2	5–1	5–3	5–2	5–0
Shiori Komata (JPN)	2–5	—	5–2	5–3	5–3	5–2
Nguyễn Thị Như Hoa (VIE)	1–5	2–5	—	4–5	5–4	5–1
Korawan Thanee (THA)	3–5	3–5	5–4	—	5–2	5–0
Ganboldyn Khaliunaa (MGL)	2–5	3–5	4–5	2–5	—	5–1
Thkrayat Al-Abdulla (QAT)	0–5	2–5	1–5	0–5	1–5	—

==== Pool E ====
Athlete	CHN	HKG	SGP	THA	QAT	UAE
Zhu Mingye (CHN)	—	2–3	5–2	5–3	5–3	5–0
Kaylin Hsieh (HKG)	3–2	—	5–2	4–5	5–1	5–1
Victoria Lim (SGP)	2–5	2–5	—	5–4	5–1	5–2
Wijitta Takhamwong (THA)	3–5	5–4	4–5	—	5–2	5–1
Wadha Al-Abdulla (QAT)	3–5	1–5	1–5	2–5	—	4–5
Reem Al-Shamma (UAE)	0–5	1–5	2–5	1–5	5–4	—

==== Summary ====
Rank	Pool	Athlete	W	L	W/M	TD	TF
1	A	Sun Yiwen (CHN)	5	0	1.000	+19	25
2	D	Vivian Kong (HKG)	5	0	1.000	+17	25
3	B	Kang Young-mi (KOR)	5	0	1.000	+11	24
4	E	Zhu Mingye (CHN)	4	1	0.800	+11	22
4	E	Kaylin Hsieh (HKG)	4	1	0.800	+11	22
6	B	Kanna Oishi (JPN)	4	1	0.800	+10	23
7	C	Jyotika Dutta (IND)	4	1	0.800	+9	23
8	D	Shiori Komata (JPN)	4	1	0.800	+7	22
9	A	Cheryl Lim (SGP)	4	1	0.800	+4	19
10	E	Wijitta Takhamwong (THA)	3	2	0.600	+5	22
11	D	Korawan Thanee (THA)	3	2	0.600	+5	21
12	C	Dominique Tannous (LBN)	3	2	0.600	+3	21
13	C	Choi In-jeong (KOR)	3	2	0.600	+2	21
14	E	Victoria Lim (SGP)	3	2	0.600	+2	19
15	A	Kamilia Abdyl-Khamitova (KGZ)	3	2	0.600	−2	17
16	A	Assel Alibekova (KAZ)	2	3	0.400	0	19
17	B	Nai Salameh (LBN)	2	3	0.400	−1	19
18	C	Ulyana Balaganskaya (KAZ)	2	3	0.400	−2	19
19	C	Baatarchuluuny Gerelmaa (MGL)	2	3	0.400	−2	17
20	B	Trần Thị Thùy Trinh (VIE)	2	3	0.400	−3	18
21	D	Nguyễn Thị Như Hoa (VIE)	2	3	0.400	−3	17
22	B	Jas Seerat Singh (IND)	2	3	0.400	−8	14
23	D	Ganboldyn Khaliunaa (MGL)	1	4	0.200	−5	16
24	A	Goh Bee Hooi (MAS)	1	4	0.200	−6	16
25	C	Hanniel Abella (PHI)	1	4	0.200	−10	14
26	E	Reem Al-Shamma (UAE)	1	4	0.200	−15	9
27	B	Megawati (INA)	0	5	0.000	−9	16
28	E	Wadha Al-Abdulla (QAT)	0	5	0.000	−14	11
29	A	Anis Rohadatul Niehlah Riyati (INA)	0	5	0.000	−15	9
30	D	Thkrayat Al-Abdulla (QAT)	0	5	0.000	−21	4

=== Knockout round ===
==== Final ====
Gold medal match
1	Sun Yiwen (CHN)	7
3	Kang Young-mi (KOR)	11

==== Top half ====
Round of 32
17	Nai Salameh (LBN)	4
16	Assel Alibekova (KAZ)	15
9	Cheryl Lim (SGP)	14
24	Goh Bee Hooi (MAS)	8
21	Nguyễn Thị Như Hoa (VIE)	15
12	Dominique Tannous (LBN)	13
13	Choi In-jeong (KOR)	15
20	Trần Thị Thùy Trinh (VIE)	7

Round of 16
1	Sun Yiwen (CHN)	15
16	Assel Alibekova (KAZ)	8
9	Cheryl Lim (SGP)	10
8	Shiori Komata (JPN)	15
5	Kaylin Hsieh (HKG)	13
21	Nguyễn Thị Như Hoa (VIE)	10
13	Choi In-jeong (KOR)	15
4	Zhu Mingye (CHN)	14

Quarterfinals
1	Sun Yiwen (CHN)	15
8	Shiori Komata (JPN)	5
5	Kaylin Hsieh (HKG)	11
13	Choi In-jeong (KOR)	12

Semifinals
1	Sun Yiwen (CHN)	11
13	Choi In-jeong (KOR)	10

==== Bottom half ====
Round of 32
19	Baatarchuluuny Gerelmaa (MGL)	9
14	Victoria Lim (SGP)	15
11	Korawan Thanee (THA)	15
22	Jas Seerat Singh (IND)	13
23	Ganboldyn Khaliunaa (MGL)	7
10	Wijitta Takhamwong (THA)	15
15	Kamilia Abdyl-Khamitova (KGZ)	9
18	Ulyana Balaganskaya (KAZ)	15

Round of 16
3	Kang Young-mi (KOR)	15
14	Victoria Lim (SGP)	8
11	Korawan Thanee (THA)	14
6	Kanna Oishi (JPN)	15
7	Jyotika Dutta (IND)	15
10	Wijitta Takhamwong (THA)	8
18	Ulyana Balaganskaya (KAZ)	5
2	Vivian Kong (HKG)	15

Quarterfinals
3	Kang Young-mi (KOR)	15
6	Kanna Oishi (JPN)	8
7	Jyotika Dutta (IND)	3
2	Vivian Kong (HKG)	15

Semifinals
3	Kang Young-mi (KOR)	13
2	Vivian Kong (HKG)	12

== Final standing ==
Rank	Athlete
1st place, gold medalist(s)	Kang Young-mi (KOR)
2nd place, silver medalist(s)	Sun Yiwen (CHN)
3rd place, bronze medalist(s)	Choi In-jeong (KOR)
3rd place, bronze medalist(s)	Vivian Kong (HKG)
5	Kaylin Hsieh (HKG)
6	Kanna Oishi (JPN)
7	Jyotika Dutta (IND)
8	Shiori Komata (JPN)
9	Zhu Mingye (CHN)
10	Cheryl Lim (SGP)
11	Wijitta Takhamwong (THA)
12	Korawan Thanee (THA)
13	Victoria Lim (SGP)
14	Assel Alibekova (KAZ)
15	Ulyana Balaganskaya (KAZ)
16	Nguyễn Thị Như Hoa (VIE)
17	Dominique Tannous (LBN)
18	Kamilia Abdyl-Khamitova (KGZ)
19	Nai Salameh (LBN)
20	Baatarchuluuny Gerelmaa (MGL)
21	Trần Thị Thùy Trinh (VIE)
22	Jas Seerat Singh (IND)
23	Ganboldyn Khaliunaa (MGL)
24	Goh Bee Hooi (MAS)
25	Hanniel Abella (PHI)
26	Reem Al-Shamma (UAE)
27	Megawati (INA)
28	Wadha Al-Abdulla (QAT)
29	Anis Rohadatul Niehlah Riyati (INA)
30	Thkrayat Al-Abdulla (QAT)
