= Fencing at the 2014 Asian Games – Women's team épée =

Women's team épée at the 2014 Asian Games
- Venue: Goyang Gymnasium
- Date: 25 September 2014
- Competitors: 31 from 8 nations

Medalists
| gold medal | China; Hao Jialu, Sun Yiwen, Sun Yujie, Xu Anqi |
| silver medal | South Korea; Choi Eun-sook, Choi In-jeong, Kim Myoung-sun, Shin A-lam |
| bronze medal | Japan; Rie Ohashi, Ayaka Shimookawa, Ayumi Yamada |
| bronze medal | Hong Kong; Chu Ka Mong, Vivian Kong, Coco Lin, Yeung Chui Ling |

The women's team épée competition at the 2014 Asian Games in Goyang was held on 25 September at the Goyang Gymnasium.

== Schedule ==
All times are Korea Standard Time (UTC+09:00)

| Date | Time | Event |
|---|---|---|
| Thursday, 25 September 2014 | 09:00 | Quarterfinals |
| Thursday, 25 September 2014 | 10:30 | Semifinals |
| Thursday, 25 September 2014 | 18:00 | Gold medal match |

== Seeding ==
The teams were seeded taking into account the results achieved by competitors representing each team in the individual event.

| Rank | Team | Fencer | | Total |
| Rank | Team | 1 | 2 | Total |
|---|---|---|---|---|
| 1 | South Korea (KOR) | 2 | 3 | 5 |
| 2 | Hong Kong (HKG) | 3 | 7 | 10 |
| 3 | China (CHN) | 1 | 12 | 13 |
| 4 | Japan (JPN) | 8 | 13 | 21 |
| 4 | Kazakhstan (KAZ) | 10 | 11 | 21 |
| 6 | Singapore (SIN) | 6 | 16 | 22 |
| 7 | Chinese Taipei (TPE) | 9 | 14 | 23 |
| 8 | Qatar (QAT) | 17 | 21 | 38 |

== Results ==
| Quarterfinals | | | Semifinals | | | Gold medal match |
| 1 | South Korea | 45 |
| 8 | Qatar | 17 | 1 | South Korea | 45 |
| 5 | Kazakhstan | 31 | 4 | Japan | 25 |
| 4 | Japan | 45 | | | | 1 | South Korea | 19 |
| 3 | China | 45 | | | | 3 | China | 43 |
| 6 | Singapore | 22 | 3 | China | 45 |
| 7 | Chinese Taipei | 43 | 2 | Hong Kong | 19 |
| 2 | Hong Kong | 45 |

== Final standing ==
| Rank | Team |
|---|---|
| 1st place, gold medalist(s) | China (CHN); Hao Jialu; Sun Yiwen; Sun Yujie; Xu Anqi |
| 2nd place, silver medalist(s) | South Korea (KOR); Choi Eun-sook; Choi In-jeong; Kim Myoung-sun; Shin A-lam |
| 3rd place, bronze medalist(s) | Japan (JPN); Rie Ohashi; Ayaka Shimookawa; Ayumi Yamada |
| 3rd place, bronze medalist(s) | Hong Kong (HKG); Chu Ka Mong; Vivian Kong; Coco Lin; Yeung Chui Ling |
| 5 | Kazakhstan (KAZ); Assel Alibekova; Ulyana Balaganskaya; Jamilya Yunusbayeva; Yanina Zakharova |
| 6 | Singapore (SIN); Goh Wan Qi; Cheryl Lim; Elizabeth Lim; Victoria Lim |
| 7 | Chinese Taipei (TPE); Chang Chia-ling; Cheng Ya-wen; Hsu Jo-ting; Tseng Hsiu-hui |
| 8 | Qatar (QAT); Wadha Al-Abdulla; Aisha Al-Musalmani; Fatma Al-Julandani; Fatima Hammad |
