= Éloïse Vanryssel =

French fencer (born 1999)

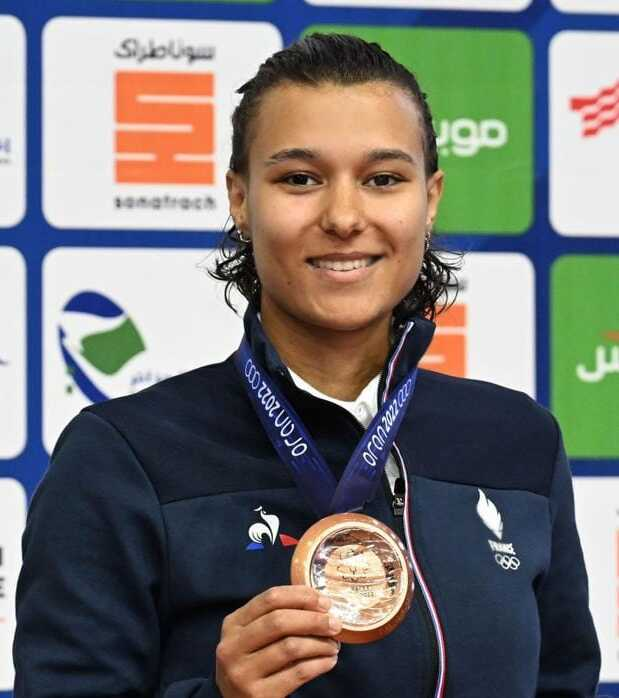
- E.Vanryssel in 2021

Personal information
- Born: 1 May 1999 (age 27)
- Weight: 63 kg (139 lb)

Fencing career
- Sport: Fencing
- Country: France
- Weapon: Épée
- Hand: Right-handed
Medal record
Representing France
World Championships
Gold medal – first place	2025 Tbilisi	Team
Mediterranean Games
Bronze medal – third place	2022 Oran	Individual
Bronze medal – third place	2026 Taranto	Individual

Éloïse Vanryssel (born 1 May 1999) is a French right-handed épée fencer. Éloïse won a gold medal in the women's team épée at the 2025 World Fencing Championships.

== Career ==
In July 2025, Vanryssel competed at the 2025 World Fencing Championships in the individual épée event and was eliminated in the quarterfinals by eventual gold medalist Vlada Kharkova. And then won a gold medal in the women's team épée.

== Personal life ==
Vanryssel attends École polytechnique universitaire de Sorbonne Université where Eloïse studied agri-food engineering.
