= Women's team épée at the 2023 World Fencing Championships =

- Venue: Milan Convention Center
- Location: Milan, Italy
- Dates: 27–28 July
- Competitors: 103 from 36 nations
- Teams: 36

Medalists
gold medal	Renata Knapik-Miazga; Magdalena Pawłowska; Martyna Swatowska-Wenglarczyk; Ewa Trzebińska	Poland
silver medal	Rossella Fiamingo; Federica Isola; Mara Navarria; Alberta Santuccio	Italy
bronze medal	Choi In-jeong; Kang Young-mi; Lee Hye-in; Song Se-ra	South Korea

The Women's team épée competition at the 2023 World Fencing Championships was held on 27 and 28 July 2023.

== Draw ==
=== Finals ===
Semifinals
South Korea	32
Poland	33
Italy	40
Switzerland	36

Final
Poland	32
Italy	28
Third place
South Korea	45
Switzerland	32

=== Top half ===
==== Section 1 ====
Round of 64
Uzbekistan	45
Costa Rica	22

Round of 32
South Korea	45
Uzbekistan	32
Romania	34
Japan	38
Hungary	41
Venezuela	25
Great Britain	36
Ukraine	40

Round of 16
South Korea	45
Japan	34
Hungary	28
Ukraine	45

Quarterfinals
South Korea	40
Ukraine	37

==== Section 2 ====
Round of 64
Georgia	45
Croatia	27

Round of 32
United States	45
Colombia	21
Argentina	26
Israel	45
Egypt	45
Brazil	36
Georgia	33
Poland	45

Round of 16
United States	38
Israel	45
Egypt	28
Poland	45

Quarterfinals
Israel	34
Poland	45

=== Bottom half ===
==== Section 3 ====
Round of 64
Australia	23
Finland	45

Round of 32
Italy	45
Finland	22
Spain	32
Canada	34
Estonia	45
Singapore	16
Morocco	19
Hong Kong	45

Round of 16
Italy	45
Canada	30
Estonia	32
Hong Kong	40

Quarterfinals
Italy	29
Hong Kong	26

==== Section 4 ====
Round of 64
Kazakhstan	45
New Zealand	24

Round of 32
China	45
India	21
Mexico	33
Switzerland	45
Germany	40
Sweden	45
Kazakhstan	29
France	34

Round of 16
China	44
Switzerland	45
Sweden	39
France	45

Quarterfinals
Switzerland	41
France	40

=== Placement rounds ===
==== 5–8th place bracket ====
5–8th place semifinals
Ukraine	45
Israel	31
Hong Kong	31
France	45

Fifth place
Ukraine	33
France	45
Seventh place
Israel	41
Hong Kong	33

==== 9–16th place bracket ====
9–16th place quarterfinals
Japan	42
Hungary	45
United States	45
Egypt	23
Canada	29
Estonia	45
China	43
Sweden	38

9–12th place semifinals
Hungary	40
United States	45
Estonia	34
China	26

Ninth place
United States	35
Estonia	36
Eleventh place
Hungary	45
China	35

==== 13–16th place bracket ====
13–16th place semifinals
Japan	44
Egypt	29
Canada	45
Sweden	40

13th place
Japan	45
Canada	31
15th place
Egypt	18
Sweden	41

== Final ranking ==
Rank	Team
1st place, gold medalist(s)	Poland
2nd place, silver medalist(s)	Italy
3rd place, bronze medalist(s)	South Korea
4	Switzerland
5	France
6	Ukraine
7	Israel
8	Hong Kong
9	Estonia
10	United States
11	Hungary
12	China
13	Japan
14	Canada
15	Sweden
16	Egypt
17	Germany
18	Romania
19	Spain
20	Brazil
21	Argentina
22	Singapore
23	Mexico
24	Venezuela
25	Great Britain
26	India
27	Morocco
28	Colombia
29	Georgia
30	Finland
31	Kazakhstan
32	Uzbekistan
33	Costa Rica
34	New Zealand
35	Australia
36	Croatia
