= Women's team épée at the 2022 World Fencing Championships =

- Venue: Cairo Stadium Indoor Halls Complex
- Location: Cairo, Egypt
- Dates: 20–21 July
- Competitors: 132 from 33 nations
- Teams: 33

Medalists
gold medal	Choi In-jeong; Kang Young-mi; Lee Hye-in; Song Se-ra	South Korea
silver medal	Rossella Fiamingo; Federica Isola; Mara Navarria; Alberta Santuccio	Italy
bronze medal	Renata Knapik-Miazga; Magdalena Pawłowska; Kamila Pytka; Martyna Swatowska-Wenglarczyk	Poland

The Women's team épée competition at the 2022 World Fencing Championships was held on 20 and 21 July 2022.

== Draw ==
=== Finals ===
Semifinals
South Korea	45
Poland	28
France	29
Italy	30

Final
South Korea	45
Italy	37
Third place
Poland	34
France	33

=== Top half ===
==== Section 1 ====
Round of 64
Nepal	23
Iran	45

Round of 32
South Korea	45
Iran	20
Spain	27
Israel	43
Hong Kong	44
Singapore	30
India	17
Germany	45

Round of 16
South Korea	45
Israel	30
Hong Kong	45
Germany	23

Quarterfinals
South Korea	45
Hong Kong	37

==== Section 2 ====
Round of 32
Poland	45
United Arab Emirates	20
Czech Republic	45
Japan	42
Egypt	45
Argentina	40
Chile	16
United States	45

Round of 16
Poland	45
Czech Republic	26
Egypt	24
United States	45

Quarterfinals
Poland	40
United States	35

=== Bottom half ===
==== Section 3 ====
Round of 32
Estonia	45
Turkey	29
Sweden	34
Ukraine	45
Hungary	45
Brazil	20
Mexico	23
France	45

Round of 16
Estonia	42
Ukraine	44
Hungary	34
France	35

Quarterfinals
Ukraine	39
France	45

==== Section 4 ====
Round of 32
China	39
Austria	24
Great Britain	28
Switzerland	45
Canada	35
Romania	45
Uzbekistan	22
Italy	45

Round of 16
China	41
Switzerland	43
Romania	28
Italy	45

Quarterfinals
Switzerland	33
Italy	45

=== Placement rounds ===
==== 5–8th place bracket ====
5–8th place semifinals
Hong Kong	36
United States	42
Ukraine	39
Switzerland	45

Fifth place
United States	45
Switzerland	38
Seventh place
Hong Kong	44
Ukraine	37

==== 9–16th place bracket ====
9–16th place quarterfinals
Israel	38
Germany	45
Czech Republic	35
Egypt	45
Estonia	45
Hungary	36
China	29
Romania	32

9–12th place semifinals
Germany	44
Egypt	42
Estonia	37
Romania	27

Ninth place
Germany	34
Estonia	45
Eleventh place
Egypt	25
Romania	45

==== 13–16th place bracket ====
13–16th place semifinals
Israel	41
Czech Republic	42
Hungary	43
China	45

13th place
Czech Republic
China	w/o
15th place
Israel	39
Hungary	45

== Final ranking ==
Rank	Team
1st place, gold medalist(s)	South Korea
2nd place, silver medalist(s)	Italy
3rd place, bronze medalist(s)	Poland
4	France
5	United States
6	Switzerland
7	Hong Kong
8	Ukraine
9	Estonia
10	Germany
11	Romania
12	Egypt
13	China
14	Czech Republic
15	Hungary
16	Israel
17	Japan
18	Canada
19	Spain
20	Sweden
21	Argentina
22	Brazil
23	Great Britain
24	Singapore
25	India
26	Austria
27	Mexico
28	United Arab Emirates
29	Chile
30	Turkey
31	Uzbekistan
32	Iran
33	Nepal
