= Lauren Rembi =

French fencer

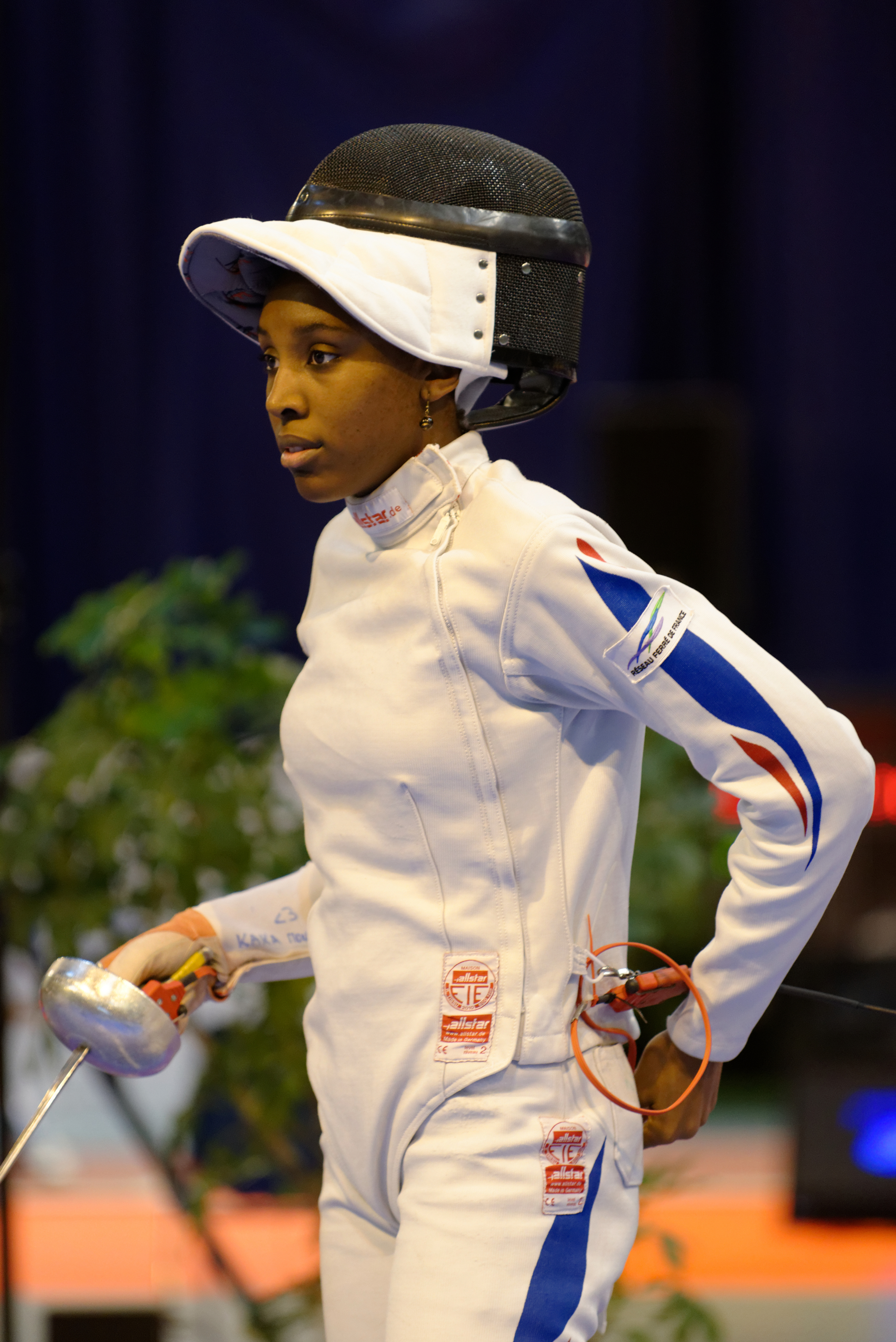
- Lauren Rembi in 2013

Personal information
- Born: 9 March 1992 (age 34) Paris, France
- Height: 1.78 m (5 ft 10 in)
- Weight: 60 kg (132 lb)

Fencing career
- Sport: Fencing
- Weapon: épée
- Hand: right-handed
- Club: AS Bondy
Medal record
Women's épée
Representing France
World Championships
Gold medal – first place	2025 Tbilisi	Team
European Championships
Gold medal – first place	2017 Tbilisi	Team
Gold medal – first place	2022 Antalya	Team
Silver medal – second place	2016 Toruń	Team
Mediterranean Games
Bronze medal – third place	2018 Tarragona	Individual
Universiade
Gold medal – first place	2011 Shenzhen	Individual
Gold medal – first place	2011 Shenzhen	Team
Gold medal – first place	2013 Kazan	Team

Lauren Rembi (born 9 March 1992) is a French right-handed épée fencer and two-time team European champion and 2016 Olympian.

== Career ==
Rembi competed in the women's individual épée and the women's team épée events at the 2016 Summer Olympics. In the individual épée, she defeated the 2016 European individual épée champion Simona Gherman in the round of 32 and lost to the current world no. 1 Emese Szász in the semi-finals. She lost the bronze medal match to Sun Yiwen 13-15.

== Personal life ==
Rembi's father is from the Democratic Republic of the Congo and her mother is from Martinique. Rembi began fencing at age six and her older sister Joséphine Jacques-André-Coquin represented France in fencing.

== Medal Record ==
=== European Championship ===
Year	Location	Event	Position
2016	Toruń, Poland	Team Women's Épée	2nd
2017	(Georgia (country)) Tbilisi, Georgia	Team Women's Épée	1st
2022	Antalya, Turkey	Team Women's Épée	1st

=== World Cup ===
Date	Location	Event	Position
2013-01-19	Doha, Qatar	Individual Women's Épée	3rd
2013-03-08	Barcelona, Spain	Individual Women's Épée	3rd
2014-05-16	Rio de Janeiro, Brazil	Individual Women's Épée	1st
2016-01-22	Barcelona, Spain	Individual Women's Épée	2nd
2017-02-10	Legnano, Italy	Individual Women's Épée	2nd
