= Women's team épée at the 2025 World Fencing Championships =

- Venue: Olympic Palace
- Location: Tbilisi, Georgia
- Dates: 25 July (preliminaries); 26 July (finals)
- Competitors: 148 from 38 nations
- Teams: 38

Medalists
gold medal	Marie-Florence Candassamy; Alexandra Louis-Marie; Lauren Rembi; Éloïse Vanryssel	France
silver medal	Milen Bavuge Khabimana; Iana Bekmurzova; Aizanat Murtazaeva; Kristina Yasinskaya
bronze medal	Kim Hyang-eun; Lee Hye-in; Lim Tae-hee; Song Se-ra	South Korea

The Women's team épée competition at the 2025 World Fencing Championships was held on 25 and 26 July 2025.

== Draw ==
=== Finals ===
Semifinals
Italy	32
France	45
South Korea	35
Individual Neutral Athletes	45

Final
France	41
Individual Neutral Athletes	32
Third place
Italy	31
South Korea	37

=== Top half ===
==== Section 1 ====
Round of 64
Netherlands	44
Costa Rica	43

Round of 32
Italy	45
Netherlands	11
Sweden	33
Hong Kong	45
Switzerland	42
Uzbekistan	29
Venezuela	23
Estonia	30

Round of 16
Italy	38
Hong Kong	23
Switzerland	34
Estonia	45

Quarterfinals
Italy	42
Estonia	27

==== Section 2 ====
Round of 64
Greece	45
South Africa	25
Great Britain	45
Georgia	38

Round of 32
Poland	38
Greece	31
Finland	39
Egypt	37
Japan	39
Kazakhstan	40
Great Britain	28
France	36

Round of 16
Poland	45
Finland	26
Kazakhstan	33
France	45

Quarterfinals
Poland	30
France	34

=== Bottom half ===
==== Section 3 ====
Round of 64
Czech Republic	45
Mexico	27
India	45
Iran	39

Round of 32
South Korea	45
Czech Republic	31
Spain	35
Germany	36
Canada	45
Singapore	20
India	26
Ukraine	45

Round of 16
South Korea	45
Germany	36
Canada	45
Ukraine	43

Quarterfinals
South Korea	45
Canada	38

==== Section 4 ====
Round of 64
Individual Neutral Athletes	45
Kuwait	20

Round of 32
United States	44
Brazil	19
Colombia	30
Hungary	45
Romania	32
Israel	45
Individual Neutral Athletes	45
China	31

Round of 16
United States	45
Hungary	43
Israel	33
Individual Neutral Athletes	44

Quarterfinals
United States	37
Individual Neutral Athletes	44

=== Placement rounds ===
==== 5–8th place bracket ====
5–8th place semifinals
Estonia	41
Poland	27
Canada	31
United States	39

Fifth place
Estonia	34
United States	45
Seventh place
Poland	36
Canada	45

==== 9–16th place bracket ====
9–16th place quarterfinals
Hong Kong	32
Switzerland	45
Finland	38
Kazakhstan	45
Germany	28
Ukraine	45
Hungary	45
Israel	40

9–12th place semifinals
Switzerland	45
Kazakhstan	34
Ukraine	45
Hungary	37

Ninth place
Switzerland	40
Ukraine	45
Eleventh place
Kazakhstan	31
Hungary	45

==== 13–16th place bracket ====
13–16th place semifinals
Hong Kong	45
Finland	23
Germany	43
Israel	45

13th place
Hong Kong	45
Israel	29
15th place
Finland	34
Germany	37

== Final ranking ==
Rank	Team
1st place, gold medalist(s)	France
2nd place, silver medalist(s)	Individual Neutral Athletes
3rd place, bronze medalist(s)	South Korea
4	Italy
5	United States
6	Estonia
7	Canada
8	Poland
9	Ukraine
10	Switzerland
11	Hungary
12	Kazakhstan
13	Hong Kong
14	Israel
15	Germany
16	Finland
17	China
18	Egypt
19	Japan
20	Romania
21	Sweden
22	Spain
23	Singapore
24	Colombia
25	Uzbekistan
26	Venezuela
27	Brazil
28	India
29	Great Britain
30	Netherlands
31	Czech Republic
32	Greece
33	South Africa
34	Mexico
35	Costa Rica
36	Kuwait
37	Georgia
38	Iran
