= Fencing at the 2014 Asian Games – Women's individual épée =

Women's individual épée at the 2014 Asian Games
- Venue: Goyang Gymnasium
- Date: 22 September 2014
- Competitors: 22 from 13 nations

Medalists
gold medal	Sun Yujie	China
silver medal	Shin A-lam	South Korea
bronze medal	Vivian Kong	Hong Kong
bronze medal	Choi In-jeong	South Korea

The women's individual épée competition at the 2014 Asian Games in Goyang was held on 22 September at the Goyang Gymnasium.

== Schedule ==
All times are Korea Standard Time (UTC+09:00)

Date	Time	Event
Monday, 22 September 2014	09:00	Preliminaries
Monday, 22 September 2014	11:00	Round of 32
Monday, 22 September 2014	12:00	Round of 16
Monday, 22 September 2014	13:30	Quarterfinals
Monday, 22 September 2014	18:00	Semifinals
Monday, 22 September 2014	20:00	Gold medal match

== Results ==
=== Preliminaries ===
==== Pool A ====
Athlete	CHN	TPE	HKG	MAC	MGL	PLE
Sun Yujie (CHN)	—	5–1	3–1	5–1	5–1	5–3
Chang Chia-ling (TPE)	1–5	—	1–0	5–2	5–3	5–2
Yeung Chui Ling (HKG)	1–3	0–1	—	5–1	5–1	5–2
Leong Sok Man (MAC)	1–5	2–5	1–5	—	4–5	5–4
Baatarchuluuny Gerelmaa (MGL)	1–5	3–5	1–5	5–4	—	5–4
Hanin Al-Zamer (PLE)	3–5	2–5	2–5	4–5	4–5	—

==== Pool B ====
Athlete	KOR	KAZ	TPE	LIB	MGL	UZB
Choi In-jeong (KOR)	—	5–1	5–4	5–4	5–3	5–0
Jamilya Yunusbayeva (KAZ)	1–5	—	5–2	3–4	5–1	4–3
Cheng Ya-wen (TPE)	4–5	2–5	—	4–5	5–0	5–3
Dominique Tannous (LIB)	4–5	4–3	5–4	—	5–1	5–1
Batkhüügiin Tsolmon (MGL)	3–5	1–5	0–5	1–5	—	3–5
Gulmira Ziyaeva (UZB)	0–5	3–4	3–5	1–5	5–3	—

==== Pool C ====
Athlete	KOR	JPN	KAZ	SIN	QAT
Shin A-lam (KOR)	—	5–2	2–5	5–3	5–0
Ayaka Shimookawa (JPN)	2–5	—	4–5	5–2	5–0
Ulyana Balaganskaya (KAZ)	5–2	5–4	—	3–5	5–4
Victoria Lim (SIN)	3–5	2–5	5–3	—	4–5
Aisha Al-Musalmani (QAT)	0–5	0–5	4–5	5–4	—

==== Pool D ====
Athlete	CHN	HKG	JPN	SIN	QAT
Xu Anqi (CHN)	—	5–3	4–5	3–5	5–0
Vivian Kong (HKG)	3–5	—	5–4	5–2	5–0
Rie Ohashi (JPN)	5–4	4–5	—	3–5	5–4
Cheryl Lim (SIN)	5–3	2–5	5–3	—	5–1
Fatima Hammad (QAT)	0–5	0–5	4–5	1–5	—

==== Summary ====
Rank	Pool	Athlete	W	L	W/M	TD	TF
1	A	Sun Yujie (CHN)	5	0	1.000	+16	23
2	B	Choi In-jeong (KOR)	5	0	1.000	+13	25
3	B	Dominique Tannous (LIB)	4	1	0.800	+9	23
4	A	Chang Chia-ling (TPE)	4	1	0.800	+5	17
5	D	Vivian Kong (HKG)	3	1	0.750	+7	18
6	C	Shin A-lam (KOR)	3	1	0.750	+7	17
7	D	Cheryl Lim (SIN)	3	1	0.750	+5	17
8	C	Ulyana Balaganskaya (KAZ)	3	1	0.750	+3	18
9	A	Yeung Chui Ling (HKG)	3	2	0.600	+8	16
10	B	Jamilya Yunusbayeva (KAZ)	3	2	0.600	+3	18
11	D	Xu Anqi (CHN)	2	2	0.500	+4	17
12	C	Ayaka Shimookawa (JPN)	2	2	0.500	+4	16
13	D	Rie Ohashi (JPN)	2	2	0.500	−1	17
14	B	Cheng Ya-wen (TPE)	2	3	0.400	+2	20
15	A	Baatarchuluuny Gerelmaa (MGL)	2	3	0.400	−8	15
16	C	Victoria Lim (SIN)	1	3	0.250	−4	14
17	C	Aisha Al-Musalmani (QAT)	1	3	0.250	−10	9
18	B	Gulmira Ziyaeva (UZB)	1	4	0.200	−10	12
19	A	Leong Sok Man (MAC)	1	4	0.200	−11	13
20	A	Hanin Al-Zamer (PLE)	0	5	0.000	−10	15
21	D	Fatima Hammad (QAT)	0	4	0.000	−15	5
22	B	Batkhüügiin Tsolmon (MGL)	0	5	0.000	−17	8

=== Knockout round ===
==== Final ====
Gold medal match
1	Sun Yujie (CHN)	6
6	Shin A-lam (KOR)	5

==== Top half ====
Round of 32
17	Aisha Al-Musalmani (QAT)	10
16	Victoria Lim (SIN)	15

Round of 16
1	Sun Yujie (CHN)	15
16	Victoria Lim (SIN)	4
9	Yeung Chui Ling (HKG)	15
8	Ulyana Balaganskaya (KAZ)	9
5	Vivian Kong (HKG)	15
12	Ayaka Shimookawa (JPN)	14
13	Rie Ohashi (JPN)	15
4	Chang Chia-ling (TPE)	13

Quarterfinals
1	Sun Yujie (CHN)	15
9	Yeung Chui Ling (HKG)	6
5	Vivian Kong (HKG)	15
13	Rie Ohashi (JPN)	13

Semifinals
1	Sun Yujie (CHN)	15
5	Vivian Kong (HKG)	9

==== Bottom half ====
Round of 32

Round of 16
3	Dominique Tannous (LIB)	15
14	Cheng Ya-wen (TPE)	14
11	Xu Anqi (CHN)	13
6	Shin A-lam (KOR)	15
7	Cheryl Lim (SIN)	12
10	Jamilya Yunusbayeva (KAZ)	11
15	Baatarchuluuny Gerelmaa (MGL)	4
2	Choi In-jeong (KOR)	15

Quarterfinals
3	Dominique Tannous (LIB)	9
6	Shin A-lam (KOR)	15
7	Cheryl Lim (SIN)	13
2	Choi In-jeong (KOR)	15

Semifinals
6	Shin A-lam (KOR)	15
2	Choi In-jeong (KOR)	10

== Final standing ==
Rank	Athlete
1st place, gold medalist(s)	Sun Yujie (CHN)
2nd place, silver medalist(s)	Shin A-lam (KOR)
3rd place, bronze medalist(s)	Vivian Kong (HKG)
3rd place, bronze medalist(s)	Choi In-jeong (KOR)
5	Dominique Tannous (LIB)
6	Cheryl Lim (SIN)
7	Yeung Chui Ling (HKG)
8	Rie Ohashi (JPN)
9	Chang Chia-ling (TPE)
10	Ulyana Balaganskaya (KAZ)
11	Jamilya Yunusbayeva (KAZ)
12	Xu Anqi (CHN)
13	Ayaka Shimookawa (JPN)
14	Cheng Ya-wen (TPE)
15	Baatarchuluuny Gerelmaa (MGL)
16	Victoria Lim (SIN)
17	Aisha Al-Musalmani (QAT)
18	Gulmira Ziyaeva (UZB)
19	Leong Sok Man (MAC)
20	Hanin Al-Zamer (PLE)
21	Fatima Hammad (QAT)
22	Batkhüügiin Tsolmon (MGL)
