= Lebanon at the 2018 Summer Youth Olympics =

- IOC code: LBN
- NOC: Lebanese Olympic Committee
- Website: http://www.lebolymp.org/

in Buenos Aires, Argentina 6 – 18 October 2018
- Competitors: 3 in 3 sports
- Medals: Gold 0 Silver 0 Bronze 0 Total 0

Summer Youth Olympics appearances
- 2010; 2014; 2018

Lebanon participated at the 2018 Summer Youth Olympics in Buenos Aires, Argentina from 6 to 18 October 2018.

== Fencing ==
Lebanon was given a quota to compete by the tripartite committee.

- Girls' Épée - 1 quota

== Rowing ==
Lebanon was given a tripartite invitation to compete.

- Girls' single sculls - 1 athlete

== Swimming ==
Boys

Athlete	Event	Heats		Semifinals		Final	
Athlete	Event	Time	Rank	Time	Rank	Time	Rank
Ramy Ghaziri	100 metre backstroke	58.27	21	did not advance			
