= Alexandra Ndolo =

German fencer (born 1986)

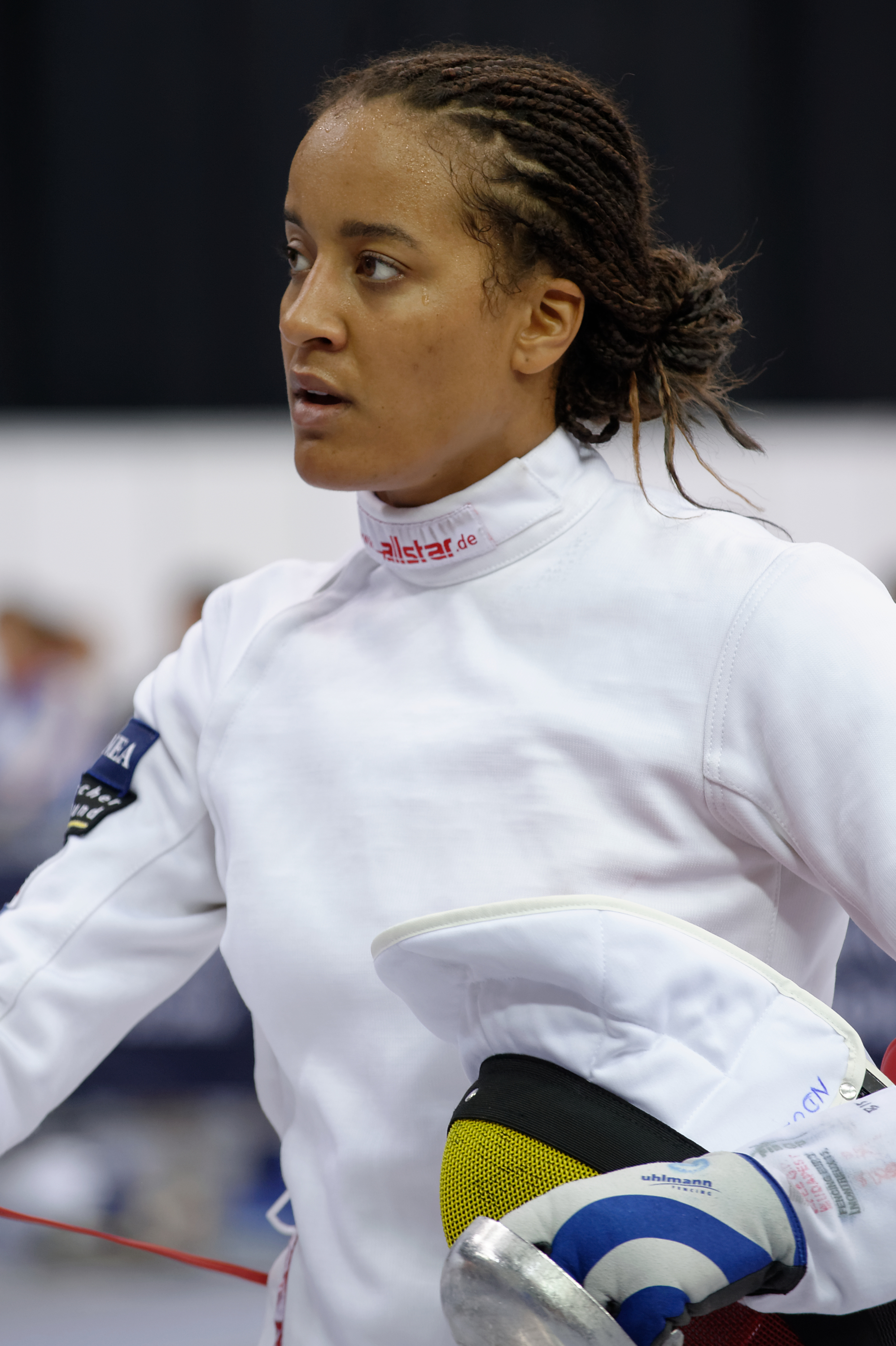

Personal information
- Born: 13 August 1986 (age 39) Bayreuth, Northern Bavaria, Germany

Fencing career
- Sport: Fencing
- Country: Kenya (from 2022 on)
- Former country: Germany
- Weapon: Épée
- Hand: Left-handed
Medal record
Women's épée
Representing Germany
World Championships
Silver medal – second place	2022 Cairo	Individual
European Championships
Silver medal – second place	2017 Tbilisi	Individual
Bronze medal – third place	2019 Düsseldorf	Individual
Representing Kenya
African Championships
Gold medal – first place	2024 Casablanca	Individual

Alexandra Ndolo (born 13 August 1986) is a German-born left-handed épée fencer who switched allegiances to fence for Kenya in 2022. She qualified to be Kenya's only fencer at the Paris Olympics in 2024.

== Life ==
Ndolo was born in Bayreuth, Northern Bavaria, Germany in 1986. Her mother was Polish and her father was from Kenya.

She represented Germany at the 2013 Summer Universiade held in Kazan, Russia. In 2014 she took an interest in Kenya when she started donating equipment. She competed in the women's épée event at the World Fencing Championships in 2015, 2017 and 2019.

Ndolo won the silver medal in the women's épée event at the 2017 European Fencing Championships held in Tbilisi, Georgia.

Ndolo won one of the bronze medals in her event at the 2019 European Fencing Championships held in Düsseldorf, Germany. This was the same year that she was one of the founders of the Kenya Fencing Association, even though many Kenyans were unaware of the sport. She also competed at the 2022 European Fencing Championships held in Antalya, Turkey.

During the COVID-19 pandemic she realised that although fencing was helping some children in Kenya, it would be sometime before the Kenya Fencing Association created a champion. Until then she would need to be that champion. She decided to change her sporting allegiance in 2022. She had won the silver medal in the women's épée event at the 2022 World Fencing Championships held in Cairo, Egypt for Germany. She still lives and trains in Cologne but she travels internationally to represent Kenya. She has twice won the African fencing championships and she is scheduled to be Kenya's only fencer at the Olympic Games.

In August 2021, Ndolo made history when she became the first black athlete to appear on the front cover of Playboy's Olympic magazine for Tokyo 2020.
