= Alberta Santuccio =

Italian fencer (born 1994)

Personal information
- Born: 22 October 1994 (age 32) Catania, Italy
- Height: 171 cm (5 ft 7 in)

Fencing career
- Sport: Fencing
- Country: Italy
- Weapon: Épée
- Hand: right-handed
- Club: GS Fiamme Oro
- FIE ranking: current ranking
Medal record
Women's épée
Representing Italy
Olympic Games
Gold medal – first place	2024 Paris	Team épée
Bronze medal – third place	2020 Tokyo	Team épée
World Championships
Gold medal – first place	2026 Hong Kong	Team
Silver medal – second place	2022 Cairo	Team
Silver medal – second place	2023 Milan	Individual
Silver medal – second place	2023 Milan	Team
European Games
Bronze medal – third place	2015 Baku	Team
Bronze medal – third place	2023 Kraków–Małopolska	Team
European Championships
Gold medal – first place	2024 Basel	Team
Silver medal – second place	2022 Antalya	Team
Bronze medal – third place	2023 Kraków	Team
Bronze medal – third place	2024 Basel	Individual
Bronze medal – third place	2025 Genoa	Individual
Bronze medal – third place	2025 Genoa	Team

Alberta Santuccio (born 22 October 1994) is an Italian right-handed épée fencer, 2024 team Olympic champion and 2021 team Olympic bronze medalist.

== Early life ==
Santuccio was born on 22 October 1994, in Catania, Italy. She began fencing at the age of seven after witnessing her brother Giorgio play the sport.

== Career ==
While competing with the CS Acireale, Santuccio won a gold medal in the individual event at the European Cadet Championship and in the international under 17 circuits. As such, she was chosen to be the flag bearer in 2010 Summer Youth Olympics. During the games, Santuccio won gold in the mixed team tournament and then silver in the girls' individual Épée. Santuccio also won two bronze medals at the 2014 and 2018 Fencing World Cup. In 2015, Santuccio came back from ninth place to beat Russia 40–36 in the 2015 European Games for a bronze medal.

Santuccio was selected to represent Team Italy at the 2020 Summer Olympics where she helped them win a bronze medal in the Team épée.

== Medal record ==
=== Olympic Games ===
Year	Location	Event	Position
2021	Tokyo, Japan	Team Women's Épée	3rd

=== World Championship ===
Year	Location	Event	Position
2022	Cairo, Egypt	Team Women's Épée	2nd

=== European Championship ===
Year	Location	Event	Position
2022	Antalya, Turkey	Team Women's Épée	2nd

=== Grand Prix ===
Date	Location	Event	Position
2017-05-26	Bogotá, Colombia	Individual Women's Épée	3rd
2022-03-05	Budapest, Hungary	Individual Women's Épée	1st

=== World Cup ===
Date	Location	Event	Position
2014-03-07	Barcelona, Spain	Individual Women's Épée	3rd
2018-11-09	Tallinn, Estonia	Individual Women's Épée	3rd
2022-05-27	Katowice, Poland	Individual Women's Épée	2nd
