= Lim Tae-hee (fencer) =

South Korean fencer (born 2002)

Personal information
- Born: 22 February 2002 (age 24)

Fencing career
- Sport: Fencing
- Country: South Korea
- Weapon: Épée
- Hand: Right-handed
Medal record
Women's épée
Representing South Korea
World Championships
Bronze medal – third place	2025 Tbilisi	Team
Bronze medal – third place	2026 Hong Kong	Team
Asian Games
Silver medal – second place	2026 Aichi-Nagoya	Team
World University Games
Bronze medal – third place	2025 Rhine-Ruhr	Team

Lim Tae-hee (Korean: 임태희; born born 22 February 2002) is a South Korean right-handed épée fencer. She is a two-time bronze medalist at the World Fencing Championships.

== Career ==
Lim competed at the 2025 Asian Fencing Championships and won a silver medal in the team épée event. In July 2025, she competed at the 2025 World Fencing Championships and won a bronze medal in the team épée event.

In June 2026, she competed at the 2026 Asian Fencing Championships and won a gold medal in the team épée event. The next month she competed at the 2026 World Fencing Championships and won a bronze medal in the team épée event.
