= Alexandra Louis-Marie =

French fencer

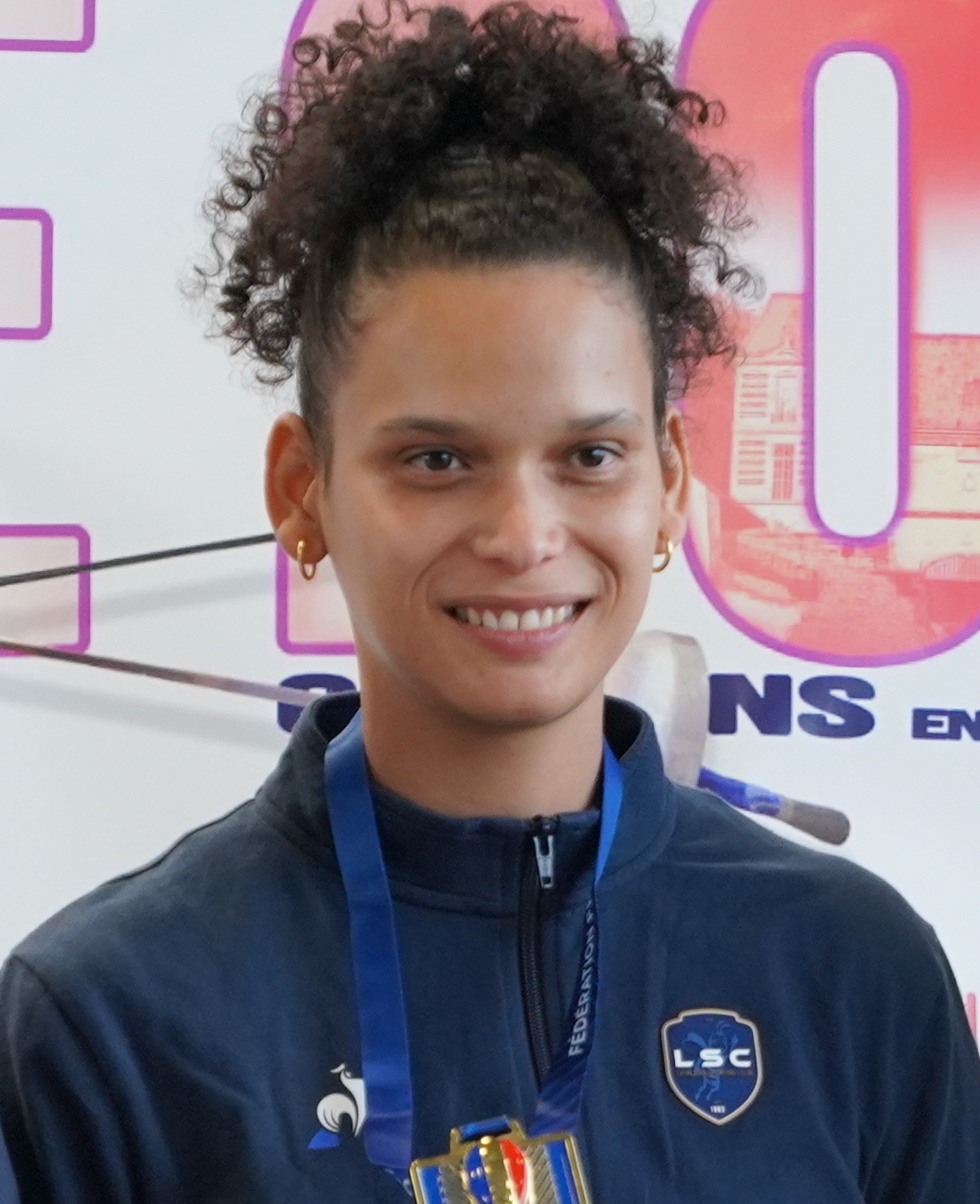
- Louis-Marie in 2023

Personal information
- Born: 3 March 1996 (age 30) Fort-de-France, Martinique, France

Fencing career
- Sport: Fencing
- Country: France
- Weapon: Épée
Medal record
Women's épée
Representing France
Olympic Games
Silver medal – second place	2024 Paris	Team
World Championships
Gold medal – first place	2025 Tbilisi	Team
European Games
Gold medal – first place	2023 Kraków–Małopolska	Team
European Championships
Gold medal – first place	2023 Plovdiv	Individual
Gold medal – first place	2023 Kraków	Team
Gold medal – first place	2026 Antony	Team
Bronze medal – third place	2024 Basel	Team
FISU World University Games
Gold medal – first place	2019 Naples	Individual

Alexandra Louis-Marie (born 3 March 1996) is a French fencer. She won a silver medal in the épée team event at the 2024 Summer Olympics.
