= Federica Isola =

Italian fencer (born 1999)

Personal information
- Born: 27 September 1999 (age 27) Milan, Italy

Fencing career
- Sport: Fencing
- Country: Italy
- Weapon: Épée
- Hand: right-handed
- Club: Centro Sportivo Aeronautica Militare
- FIE ranking: current ranking
Medal record
Women's épée
Representing Italy
Olympic Games
Bronze medal – third place	2020 Tokyo	Team épée
World Championships
Silver medal – second place	2022 Cairo	Team
Silver medal – second place	2023 Milan	Team
Bronze medal – third place	2019 Budapest	Team
European Games
Bronze medal – third place	2023 Kraków–Małopolska	Team
European Championships
Silver medal – second place	2022 Antalya	Team
Bronze medal – third place	2019 Düsseldorf	Team
Bronze medal – third place	2023 Kraków	Team

Federica Isola (born 27 September 1999) is an Italian right-handed épée fencer and 2021 team Olympic bronze medalist.

== Medal record ==
=== World Championship ===
Year	Location	Event	Position
2019	Budapest, Hungary	Team Women's Épée	3rd
2022	Cairo, Egypt	Team Women's Épée	2nd

=== European Championship ===
Year	Location	Event	Position
2019	Düsseldorf, Germany	Team Women's Épée	3rd
2022	Antalya, Turkey	Team Women's Épée	2nd

=== Grand Prix ===
Date	Location	Event	Position
2018-05-25	Cali, Colombia	Individual Women's Épée	3rd

=== World Cup ===
Date	Location	Event	Position
2021-11-19	Tallinn, Estonia	Individual Women's Épée	3rd
