= Rossella Fiamingo =

Italian fencer (born 1991)

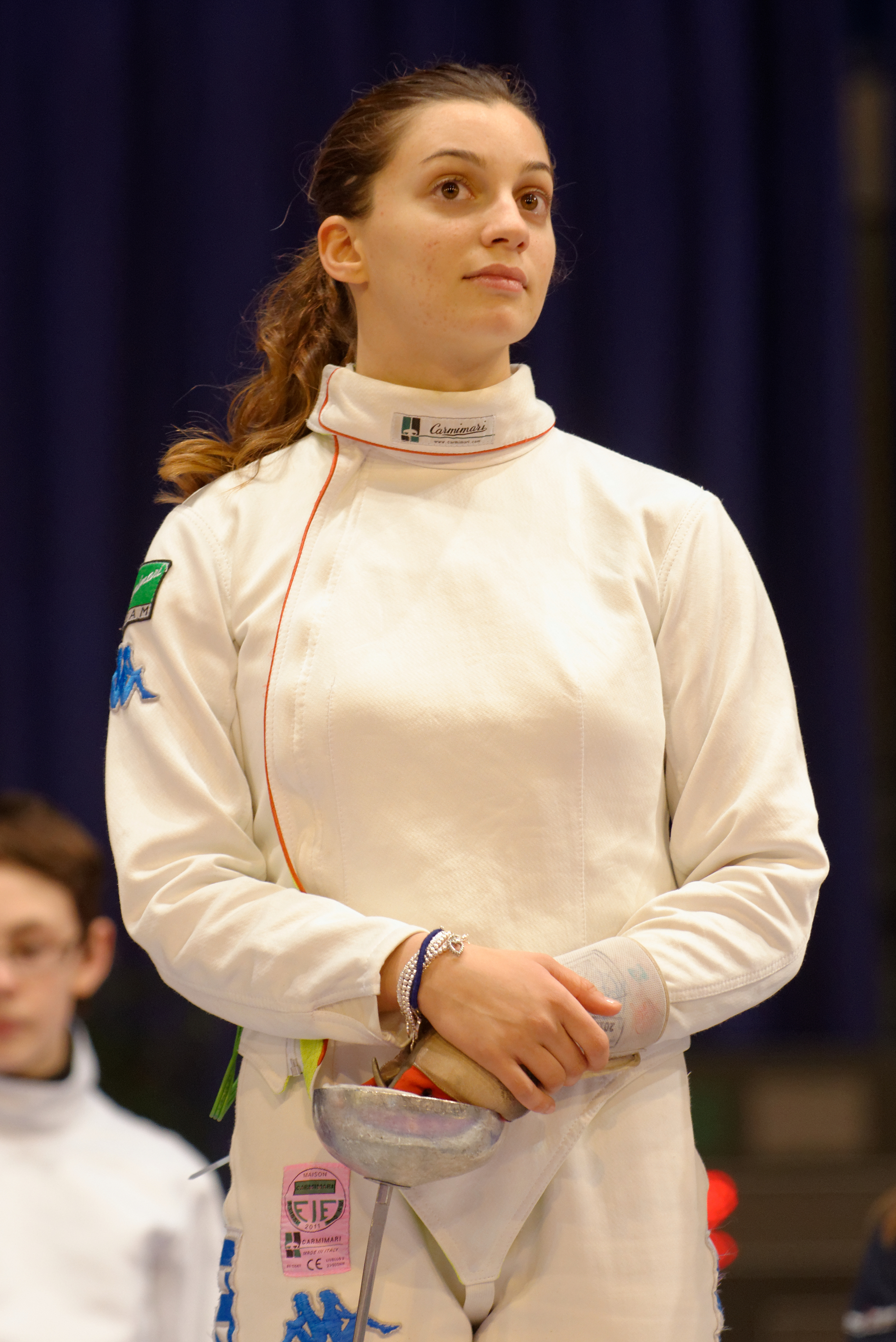
- Fiamingo in 2013

Personal information
- Born: 14 July 1991 (age 35) Catania, Italy
- Height: 1.68 m (5 ft 6 in)
- Weight: 56 kg (123 lb)

Fencing career
- Sport: Fencing
- Country: Italy
- Weapon: Épée
- Hand: left-handed
- National coach: Sandro Cuomo
- Club: AS Methodos - GS Forestale
- Personal coach: Gianni Sperlinga
- FIE ranking: current ranking
Medal record
Women's épée
Representing Italy
Olympic Games
Gold medal – first place	2024 Paris	Team
Silver medal – second place	2016 Rio de Janeiro	Individual
Bronze medal – third place	2020 Tokyo	Team
World Championships
Gold medal – first place	2014 Kazan	Individual
Gold medal – first place	2015 Moscow	Individual
Gold medal – first place	2026 Hong Kong	Team
Silver medal – second place	2022 Cairo	Team
Silver medal – second place	2023 Milan	Team
Bronze medal – third place	2011 Catania	Team
Bronze medal – third place	2014 Kazan	Team
Bronze medal – third place	2019 Budapest	Team
Bronze medal – third place	2022 Cairo	Individual
European Games
Bronze medal – third place	2023 Kraków–Małopolska	Team
European Championships
Gold medal – first place	2024 Basel	Team
Silver medal – second place	2015 Montreux	Individual
Silver medal – second place	2022 Antalya	Individual
Silver medal – second place	2022 Antalya	Team
Bronze medal – third place	2014 Strasbourg	Team
Bronze medal – third place	2015 Montreux	Team
Bronze medal – third place	2019 Düsseldorf	Team
Bronze medal – third place	2023 Kraków	Team
Bronze medal – third place	2025 Genoa	Team

Rossella Fiamingo (born 14 July 1991) is an Italian left-handed épée fencer and two-time individual world champion. A three-time Olympian, Fiamingo is a 2021 and 2024 team Olympic bronze and Gold, respectively, medalist and 2016 individual Olympic silver medalist.

She is engaged to the Olympic gold medal swimmer Gregorio Paltrinieri.

== Career ==
Fiamingo did ballet and rhythmic gymnastics as a child. She took up fencing when she was seven at the instigation of her father, who already drove her brother to a nearby fencing school, AS Methodos Catania. She was taught by Gianni Sperlinga, who remains her personal coach as of today. In 2004, she was selected into the cadet Italian national team. She won the 2007 Cadet European Championships in Novi Sad, then the 2008 Cadet World Championships at home, in Acireale. She earned both the individual and team gold medals in 2009 and 2010 at the Junior European Championships, then she won the 2010 European U23 Championships in Gdańsk.

Fiamingo joined the national senior team in the 2010–11 season. At the 2011 European Championships in Sheffield she reached the quarter-finals, where she was defeated by teammate Nathalie Moellhausen. The next season she climbed her first World Cup podium with a bronze medal in Doha, followed by a gold medal in Rio de Janeiro. Qualified to the 2012 Summer Olympics with the team, she was defeated 14–15 in the quarter-finals of the individual event by China's Sun Yujie. In the team event, Italy were defeated in the first round by the United States, then lost to Romania in the ranking matches and finished seventh.

In the 2013–14 season Fiamingo won the World Championships, defeating along the way Olympic champions Yana Shemyakina and Britta Heidemann. Rossella Fiamingo (ITA) won again women's individual épée at the 2015 world championships in Moscow to become the first woman to win back-to-back world titles in this event since Laura Flessel-Colovic (FRA) in 1998–1999. Fiamingo joined Flessel-Colovic (1998 and 1999) and Mariann Horvath (HUN, 1991 and 1992) as the only women with multiple world titles in this event. This was the third gold medal for Italy in this event, equalling France and Hungary on most wins. She in the 2014–2015 season also won the world cup. Fiamingo has a degree in pianoforte and studies nutrition at the University of Catania.

She won the silver medal in the women's épée event at the 2022 European Fencing Championships held in Antalya, Turkey. She won one of the bronze medals in the women's épée event at the 2022 World Fencing Championships held in Cairo, Egypt.

== Medal record ==
=== Olympic Games ===
Year	Location	Event	Position
2016	Rio de Janeiro, Brazil	Individual Women's Épée	2nd
2021	Tokyo, Japan	Team Women's Épée	3rd
2024	Paris, France	Team Women's Épée	1st

=== World Championship ===
Year	Location	Event	Position
2011	Catania, Italy	Team Women's Épée	3rd
2014	Kazan, Russia	Individual Women's Épée	1st
2014	Kazan, Russia	Team Women's Épée	3rd
2015	Moscow, Russia	Individual Women's Épée	1st
2019	Budapest, Hungary	Team Women's Épée	3rd
2022	Cairo, Egypt	Individual Women's Épée	3rd
2022	Cairo, Egypt	Team Women's Épée	2nd

=== European Championship ===
Year	Location	Event	Position
2014	Strasbourg, France	Team Women's Épée	3rd
2015	Montreux, Switzerland	Individual Women's Épée	2nd
2015	Montreux, Switzerland	Team Women's Épée	3rd
2019	Düsseldorf, Germany	Team Women's Épée	3rd
2022	Antalya, Turkey	Individual Women's Épée	2nd
2022	Antalya, Turkey	Team Women's Épée	2nd

=== Grand Prix ===
Date	Location	Event	Position
2012-05-19	Havana, Cuba	Individual Women's Épée	3rd
2014-02-01	Budapest, Hungary	Individual Women's Épée	3rd
2017-03-24	Budapest, Hungary	Individual Women's Épée	1st

=== World Cup ===
Date	Location	Event	Position
2011-02-12	Doha, Qatar	Individual Women's Épée	2nd
2012-02-11	Doha, Qatar	Individual Women's Épée	3rd
2012-05-04	Rio de Janeiro, Brazil	Individual Women's Épée	1st
2014-02-28	Saint-Maur-des-Fossés, France	Individual Women's Épée	2nd
2019-03-22	Chengdu, China	Individual Women's Épée	2nd
