= Sun Yiwen =

Chinese fencer (born 1992)

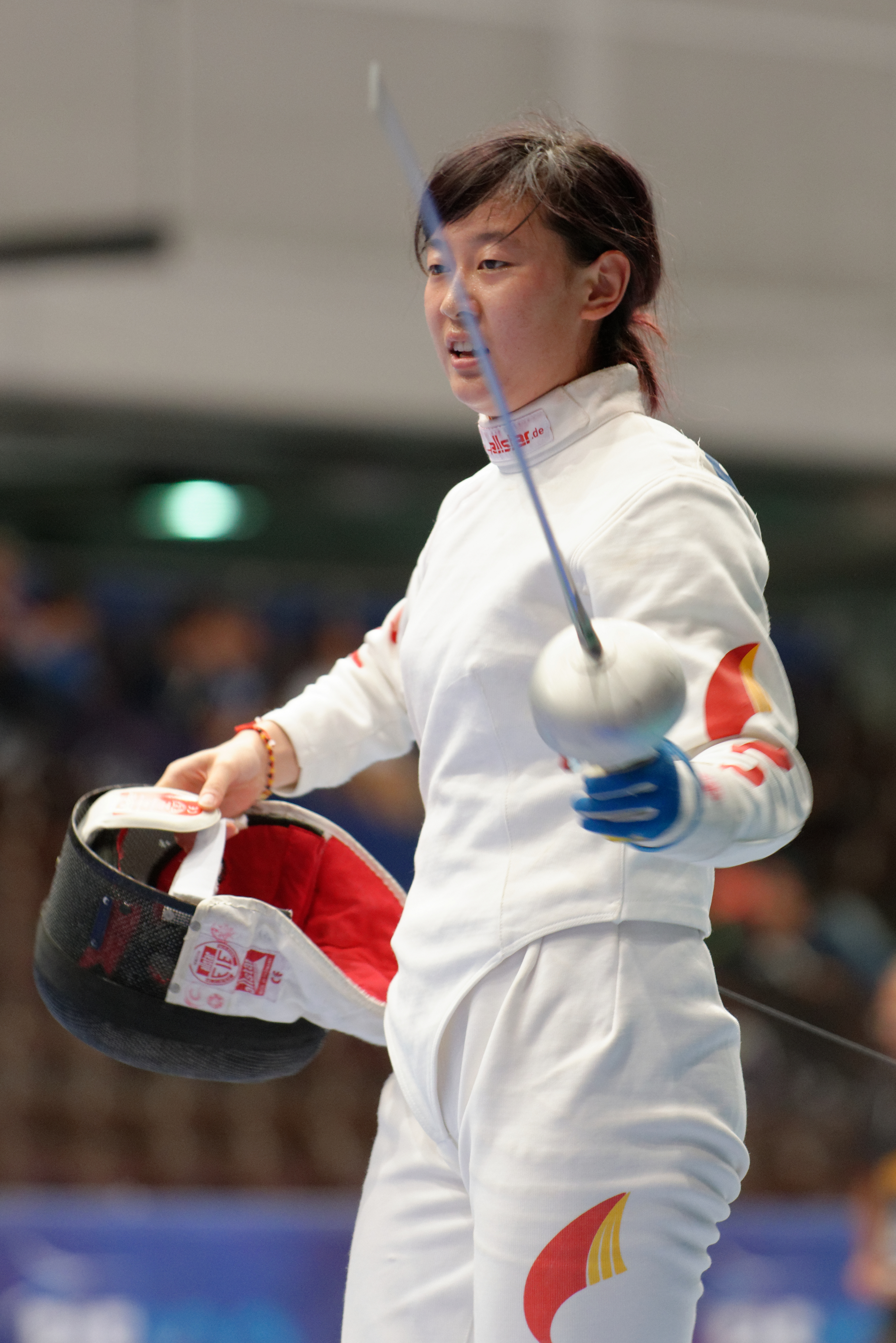
- Sun in 2013

Personal information
- Born: 17 June 1992 (age 34) Qixia, Shandong, China
- Height: 1.77 m (5 ft 10 in)
- Weight: 63 kg (139 lb)

Fencing career
- Sport: Fencing
- Country: China
- Weapon: Épée
- Hand: left-handed
- Club: Shandong
- FIE ranking: current ranking
Medal record
Women's épée
Representing China
Olympic Games
Gold medal – first place	2020 Tokyo	Individual
Silver medal – second place	2016 Rio de Janeiro	Team
Bronze medal – third place	2016 Rio de Janeiro	Individual
World Championships
Gold medal – first place	2015 Moscow	Team
Gold medal – first place	2019 Budapest	Team
Silver medal – second place	2017 Leipzig	Team
Bronze medal – third place	2018 Wuxi	Team
Bronze medal – third place	2023 Milan	Individual
Asian Games
Gold medal – first place	2014 Incheon	Team
Gold medal – first place	2018 Jakarta	Team
Silver medal – second place	2018 Jakarta	Individual
Bronze medal – third place	2022 Hangzhou	Team
Military World Games
Gold medal – first place	2019 Wuhan	Individual
Asian Championships
Silver medal – second place	2024 Kuwait City	Individual
Silver medal – second place	2024 Kuwait City	Team

Sun Yiwen (simplified Chinese: 孙一文; traditional Chinese: 孫一文; pinyin: Sūn Yīwén, born 17 June 1992) is a Chinese left-handed épée fencer. Sun is a three-time team Asian champion and two-time team world champion.

A two-time Olympian, Sun is a 2016 team Olympic silver medalist, 2016 individual Olympic bronze medalist, and 2021 individual Olympic champion.

In Tokyo, Sun became the first Chinese fencer in history to win an Olympic gold medal in individual women's épée, and only the second Chinese woman to win an Olympic gold medal in an individual fencing event, after Luan Jujie, who won a gold medal in individual women's foil at the 1984 Los Angeles Olympic Games.

During the press conference after her gold medal match, Sun revealed that some time before her departure for Tokyo, she was informed that her father had been diagnosed with cancer and was fighting for his life at a hospital in Beijing.

At the post-medals press conference, Sun stated that when she was training for the competition they were told that her father was not going to make it and "there was a high probability that I would not see him again after Tokyo... But luckily he is still alive and we remain hopeful."

== Medal record ==
=== Olympic Games ===
Year	Location	Event	Position
2016	Rio de Janeiro, Brazil	Individual Women's Épée	3rd
2016	Rio de Janeiro, Brazil	Team Women's Épée	2nd
2021	Tokyo, Japan	Individual Women's Épée	1st

=== World Championship ===
Year	Location	Event	Position
2013	Budapest, Hungary	Team Women's Épée	2nd
2015	Moscow, Russia	Team Women's Épée	1st
2017	Leipzig, Germany	Team Women's Épée	2nd
2018	Wuxi, China	Team Women's Épée	3rd
2019	Budapest, Hungary	Team Women's Épée	1st

=== Asian Championship ===
Year	Location	Event	Position
2014	Suwon, South Korea	Team Women's Épée	1st
2015	Singapore	Team Women's Épée	2nd
2016	Wuxi, China	Team Women's Épée	2nd
2017	Hong Kong, China	Individual Women's Épée	3rd
2017	Hong Kong, China	Team Women's Épée	1st
2018	Bangkok, Thailand	Team Women's Épée	1st
2019	Tokyo, Japan	Team Women's Épée	2nd

=== Grand Prix ===
Date	Location	Event	Position
2015-05-23	Rio de Janeiro, Brazil	Individual Women's Épée	3rd
2019-05-03	Cali, Colombia	Individual Women's Épée	1st

=== World Cup ===
Date	Location	Event	Position
2015-10-23	Legnano, Italy	Individual Women's Épée	1st
2017-01-20	Barcelona, Spain	Individual Women's Épée	1st
2017-11-10	Suzhou, China	Individual Women's Épée	1st
2018-01-19	Havana, Cuba	Individual Women's Épée	3rd
2018-05-04	Dubai, United Arab Emirates	Individual Women's Épée	1st
2018-11-09	Tallinn, Estonia	Individual Women's Épée	3rd
2019-11-01	Tallinn, Estonia	Individual Women's Épée	3rd
