= Kang Young-mi =

South Korean fencer (born 1985)

Personal information
- Nationality: South Korean
- Born: 1 March 1985 (age 41) Incheon, South Korea
- Height: 1.64 m (5 ft 5 in)
- Weight: 63 kg (139 lb)

Fencing career
- Sport: Fencing
- Country: South Korea
- Weapon: Épée
- FIE ranking: current ranking
Medal record
Women's épée
Representing South Korea
Olympic Games
Silver medal – second place	2020 Tokyo	Team épée
World Championships
Gold medal – first place	2022 Cairo	Team
Silver medal – second place	2018 Wuxi	Team
Bronze medal – third place	2023 Milan	Team
Asian Games
Gold medal – first place	2018 Jakarta-Palembang	Individual
Gold medal – first place	2022 Hangzhou	Team
Silver medal – second place	2018 Jakarta-Palembang	Team
Asian Championships
Gold medal – first place	2024 Kuwait City	Team
Bronze medal – third place	2024 Kuwait City	Individual

- Kang Young-mi
- Hangul: 강영미
- RR: Gang Yeongmi
- MR: Kang Yŏngmi

Kang Young-mi (Korean pronunciation: [kaŋ.jʌŋ.mi]; born 1 March 1985) is a South Korean left-handed épée fencer, four-time team Asian champion, 2017 individual Asian champion, and two-time Olympian.

== Medal record ==
=== Olympic Games ===
Year	Location	Event	Position
2021	Tokyo, Japan	Team Women's Épée	2nd

=== Asian Championship ===
Year	Location	Event	Position
2015	Singapore	Team Women's Épée	1st
2016	Wuxi, China	Team Women's Épée	1st
2016	Wuxi, China	Individual Women's Épée	3rd
2017	Hong Kong, China	Individual Women's Épée	1st
2017	Hong Kong, China	Team Women's Épée	2nd
2018	Bangkok, Thailand	Individual Women's Épée	2nd
2018	Bangkok, Thailand	Team Women's Épée	3rd
2019	Tokyo, Japan	Individual Women's Épée	3rd
2019	Tokyo, Japan	Team Women's Épée	1st
2022	Seoul, South Korea	Team Women's Épée	1st

=== Grand Prix ===
Date	Location	Event	Position
2019-03-08	Budapest, Hungary	Individual Women's Épée	2nd

=== World Cup ===
Date	Location	Event	Position
2018-02-09	Barcelona, Spain	Individual Women's Épée	3rd
2019-01-11	Havana, Cuba	Individual Women's Épée	3rd
2020-02-07	Barcelona, Spain	Individual Women's Épée	3rd
2021-03-20	Kazan, Russia	Individual Women's Épée	3rd
