= Lee Hye-in (fencer) =

South Korean fencer (born 1995)

Personal information
- Nationality: South Korean
- Born: 16 January 1995 (age 31) Ulsan, South Korea

Fencing career
- Sport: Fencing
- Weapon: Épée
- FIE ranking: current ranking
Medal record
Women's épée
Representing South Korea
Olympic Games
| Silver medal – second place | 2020 Tokyo | Team épée |
World Championships
| Gold medal – first place | 2022 Cairo | Team |
| Bronze medal – third place | 2023 Milan | Team |
| Bronze medal – third place | 2025 Tblilisi | Team |
| Bronze medal – third place | 2026 Hong Kong | Team |
Asian Games
| Gold medal – first place | 2022 Hangzhou | Team |
| Silver medal – second place | 2018 Jakarta-Palembang | Team |
| Silver medal – second place | 2026 Aichi-Nagoya | Team |
Asian Championships
| Gold medal – first place | 2024 Kuwait City | Team |

Lee Hye-in (born 16 January 1995) is a South Korean fencer. She competed in the 2020 Summer Olympics and was part of the South Korean team that won a silver medal in women's team épée fencing.
