= Choi In-jeong =

South Korean fencer (born 1990)

Choi In-Jeong
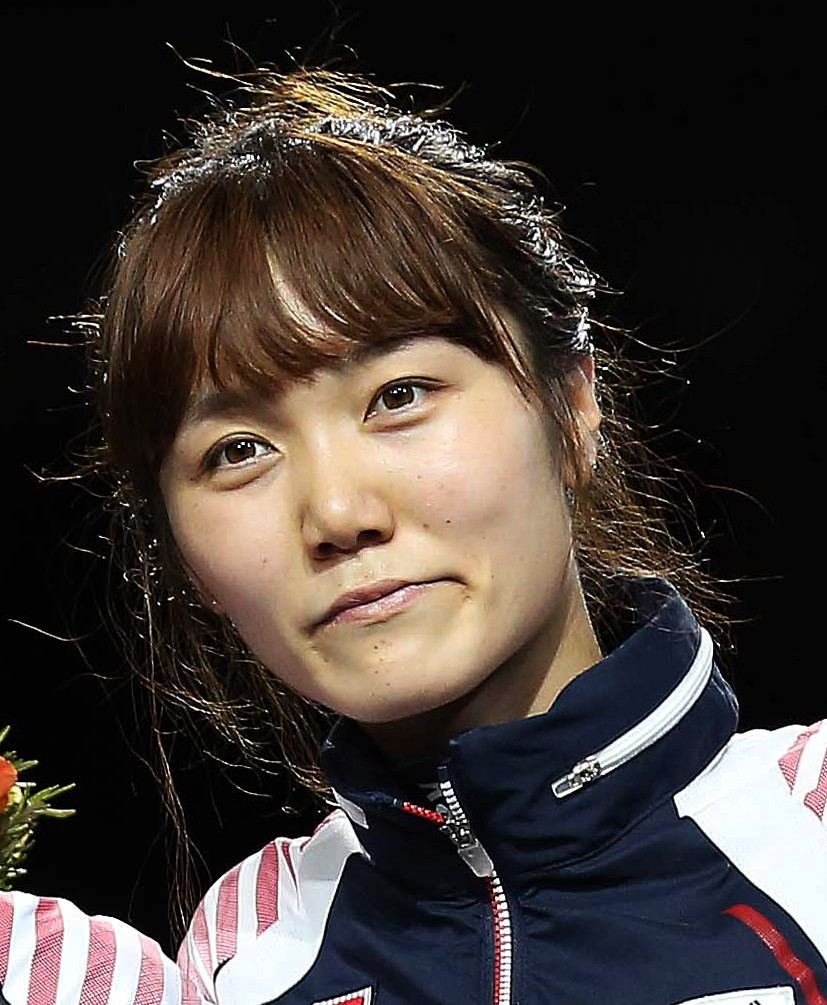
- Choi at the 2012 Summer Olympics

Personal information
- Native name: 최인정
- Nationality: South Korean
- Born: 21 May 1990 (age 36) Geumsan, South Korea

Fencing career
- Sport: Fencing
- Country: South Korea
- Weapon: Épée
- FIE ranking: current ranking
Medal record
Women's épée
Representing South Korea
Olympic Games
| Silver medal – second place | 2012 London | Team |
| Silver medal – second place | 2020 Tokyo | Team |
World Championships
| Gold medal – first place | 2022 Cairo | Team |
| Silver medal – second place | 2018 Wuxi | Team |
| Bronze medal – third place | 2023 Milan | Team |
Asian Games
| Gold medal – first place | 2022 Hangzhou | Individual |
| Gold medal – first place | 2022 Hangzhou | Team |
| Silver medal – second place | 2014 Incheon | Team |
| Silver medal – second place | 2018 Jakarta-Palembang | Team |
| Bronze medal – third place | 2014 Incheon | Individual |
| Bronze medal – third place | 2018 Jakarta-Palembang | Individual |
Asian Championships
| Gold medal – first place | 2014 Suwon City | Individual |
| Gold medal – first place | 2011 Seoul | Individual |
| Gold medal – first place | 2024 Kuwait City | Team |
| Silver medal – second place | 2011 Seoul | Team |
| Silver medal – second place | 2012 Wakayama | Team |
| Silver medal – second place | 2013 Shanghai | Team |
Universiade
| Silver medal – second place | 2013 Kazan | Team |

Choi In-Jeong (Korean: 최인정; Korean pronunciation: [tɕʰwe̞.in.dʑʌn]; born 21 May 1990) is a South Korean right-handed épée fencer, three-time team Asian champion, two-time individual Asian champion, three-time Olympian, and two-time team Olympic silver medalist.

Choi competed in the 2012 London Olympic Games, the 2016 Rio de Janeiro Olympic Games, and the 2020 Tokyo Olympic Games, winning team silver medals in 2012 and 2020.

Choi began fencing in junior high and made her international debut in 2011, at the World Cup event in Nanjing.

== Medal record ==
=== Olympic Games ===
| Year | Location | Event | Position |
|---|---|---|---|
| 2012 | London, United Kingdom | Team Women's Épée | 2nd |
| 2021 | Tokyo, Japan | Team Women's Épée | 2nd |

=== World Championship ===
| Year | Location | Event | Position |
|---|---|---|---|
| 2018 | Wuxi, China | Team Women's Épée | 2nd |

=== Asian Championship ===
| Year | Location | Event | Position |
|---|---|---|---|
| 2011 | Seoul, South Korea | Individual Women's Épée | 1st |
| 2011 | Seoul, South Korea | Team Women's Épée | 2nd |
| 2012 | Wakayama, Japan | Team Women's Épée | 2nd |
| 2013 | Shanghai, China | Team Women's Épée | 2nd |
| 2014 | Suwon, South Korea | Individual Women's Épée | 1st |
| 2014 | Suwon, South Korea | Team Women's Épée | 2nd |
| 2015 | Singapore | Individual Women's Épée | 2nd |
| 2015 | Singapore | Team Women's Épée | 1st |
| 2016 | Wuxi, China | Team Women's Épée | 1st |
| 2017 | Hong Kong, China | Team Women's Épée | 2nd |
| 2018 | Bangkok, Thailand | Team Women's Épée | 3rd |
| 2019 | Tokyo, Japan | Individual Women's Épée | 3rd |
| 2019 | Tokyo, Japan | Team Women's Épée | 1st |
| 2022 | Seoul, South Korea | Individual Women's Épée | 2nd |
| 2022 | Seoul, South Korea | Team Women's Épée | 1st |

=== Grand Prix ===
| Date | Location | Event | Position |
|---|---|---|---|
| 2013-04-27 | Xuzhou, China | Individual Women's Épée | 1st |
| 2017-03-24 | Budapest, Hungary | Individual Women's Épée | 2nd |
| 2017-12-08 | Doha, Qatar | Individual Women's Épée | 3rd |
| 2019-03-08 | Budapest, Hungary | Individual Women's Épée | 3rd |
| 2022-03-05 | Budapest, Hungary | Individual Women's Épée | 3rd |
| 2022-04-29 | Cairo, Egypt | Individual Women's Épée | 1st |

=== World Cup ===
| Date | Location | Event | Position |
|---|---|---|---|
| 2015-05-01 | Johannesburg, South Africa | Individual Women's Épée | 3rd |
| 2018-05-04 | Dubai, United Arab Emirates | Individual Women's Épée | 3rd |
| 2019-05-17 | Dubai, United Arab Emirates | Individual Women's Épée | 1st |
| 2021-03-20 | Kazan, Russia | Individual Women's Épée | 1st |
| 2022-05-27 | Katowice, Poland | Individual Women's Épée | 1st |
