= Vlada Kharkova =

Ukrainian fencer (born 1996)

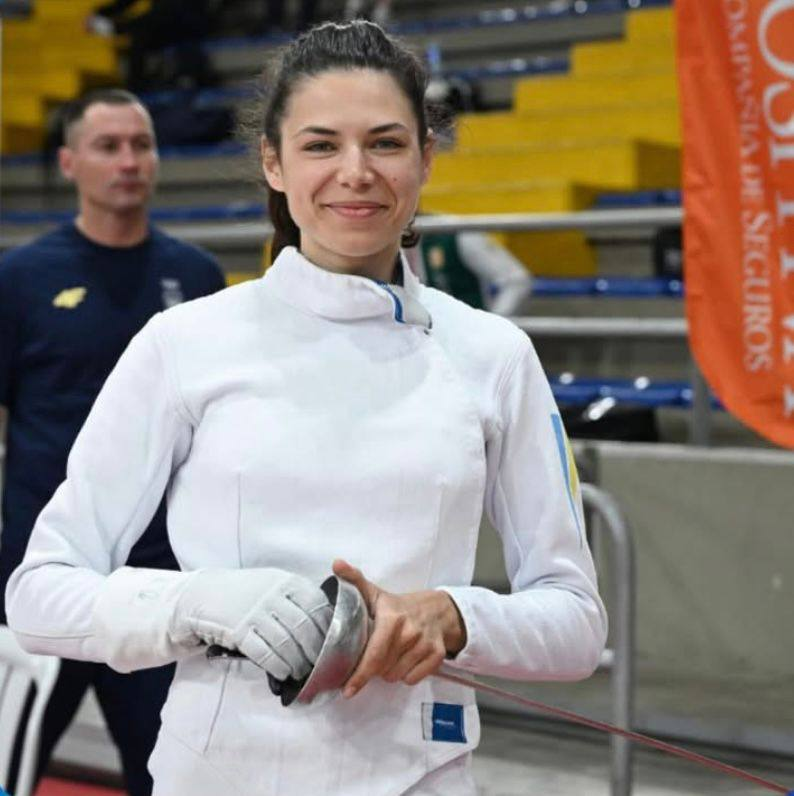
- Kharkova in 2023

Personal information
- Born: 29 September 1996 (age 30)

Fencing career
- Sport: Fencing
- Country: Ukraine
- Weapon: Épée
- Hand: Right-handed
Medal record
Representing Ukraine
World Championships
Gold medal – first place	2025 Tbilisi	Individual
World Military Championships
Gold medal – first place	2025 Seville	Individual
Silver medal – second place	2025 Seville	Team
European Championships
Gold medal – first place	2022 Antalya	Individual
Gold medal – first place	2025 Genova	Team
Bronze medal – third place	2022 Antalya	Team

Vlada Kharkova (born 29 September 1996) is a Ukrainian right-handed épée fencer and 2025 individual World champion.

== Medal Record ==
=== European Championship ===
Year	Location	Event	Position
2022	Antalya, Turkey	Individual Women's Épée	1st
2022	Antalya, Turkey	Team Women's Épée	3rd
