= Zhu Mingye =

Chinese épée fencer

Personal information
- Born: 14 January 1992 (age 34)

Fencing career
- Sport: Fencing
- Country: Chinese
- Weapon: Épée
- Hand: right-handed
- National coach: Hugues Obry
- Club: Guangdong
- FIE ranking: current ranking
Medal record
Women's épée
Representing China
World Championships
Gold medal – first place	2019 Budapest	Team
Asian Championships
Gold medal – first place	2017 Hong Kong	Team
Gold medal – first place	2019 Chiba	Individual
Silver medal – second place	2019 Chiba	Team

Zhu Mingye (simplified Chinese: 朱明叶; traditional Chinese: 朱明葉; pinyin: Zhū Míngyè; born 14 January 1992) is a Chinese épée fencer.

She participated at the 2019 World Fencing Championships, winning a medal.

== Career ==
In June 2017, Zhu Mingye won the bronze medal in the women's épée individual competition at the 2017 Asian Fencing Championships. On October 22, 2017, Zhu Mingye won the bronze medal in the team competition at the first stop of the FIE Women's Épée World Cup in the 2017–2018 season. In February 2018, Zhu Mingye won the individual championship at the FIE Women's Épée World Cup in Barcelona, Spain. On August 24, 2018, Zhu Mingye won the team championship in the women's épée team competition of the 2018 Jakarta Asian Games.

On July 22, 2019, in the women's épée team competition of the 2019 World Fencing Championships held in Budapest, Hungary, the Chinese women's épée team composed of Sun Yiwen, Xu Anqi, Zhu Mingye and Lin Sheng defeated Russia 29–28 in the final The team won the gold medal.

In 2021, Zhu Mingye was selected into the list of fencing athletes for the Chinese Sports Delegation at the 2020 Tokyo Olympics.

In June 2022, he was selected for the Chinese fencing team to participate in the 2022 Asian Fencing Championships. On June 10, 2022, she will participate in the women's épée competition of the 2022 Asian Fencing Championships. On July 15, 2022, the 2022 Fencing World Championships will be held in Cairo, the capital of Egypt. The Chinese team will be fully qualified by then. Zhu Mingye, one of the three main players from Guangdong, will compete again after participating in the Asian Championships and Olympic Games.

In February 2023, in the individual competition of the Women's Épée World Cup Spain, Zhu Mingye ranked 37th.

== Awards and honours ==
In December 2020, he won the 2020 National Sports Outstanding Contribution Award.

On September 29, 2021, the Guangdong Provincial People's Government granted individual merit awards.

In July 2022, he was selected into the list of individuals to be commended for the 2021 National Sports Outstanding Contribution Award.
