= Renata Knapik-Miazga =

Polish fencer (born 1988)

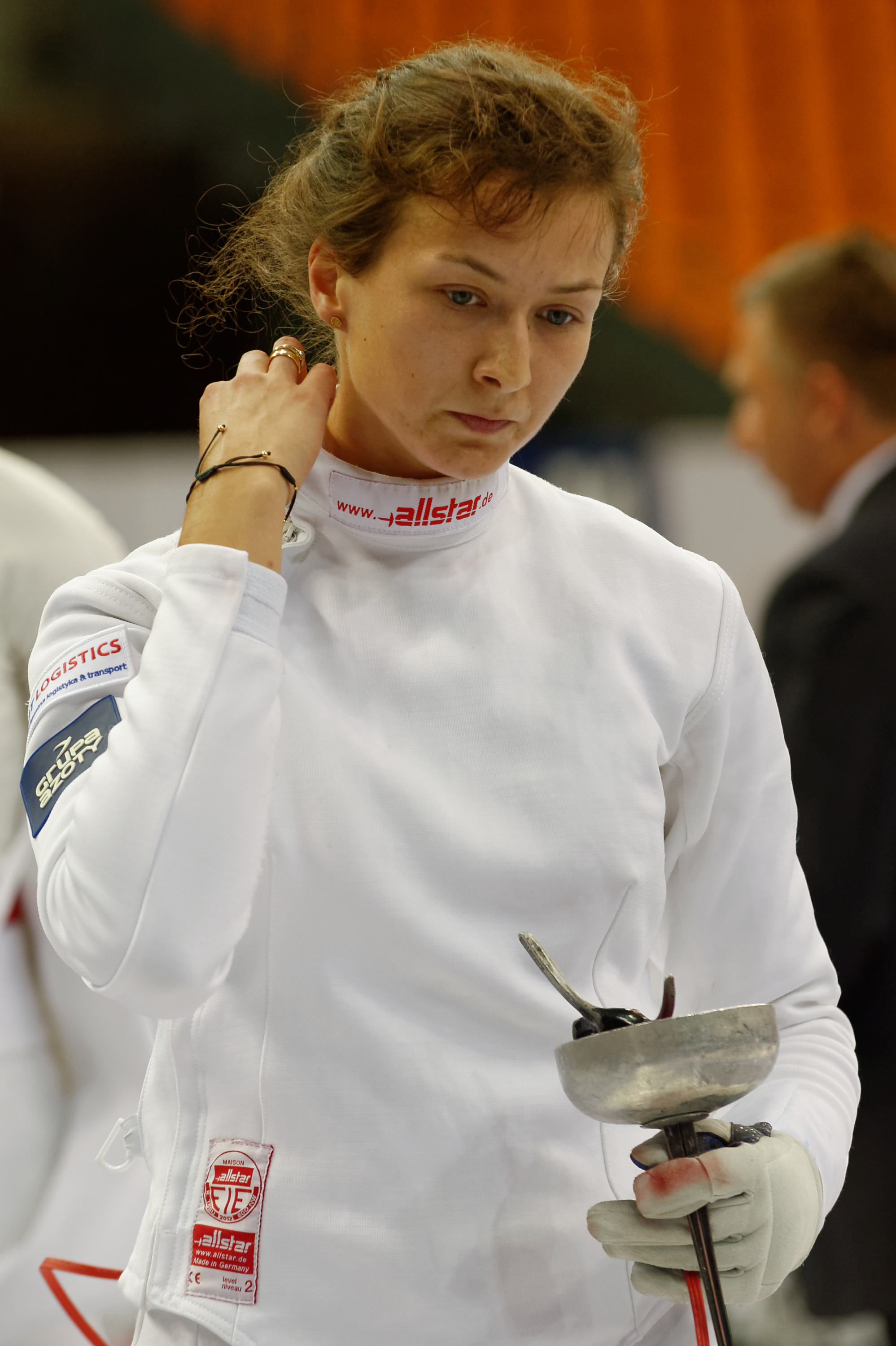
- Knapik-Miazga in 2015

Personal information
- Nationality: Polish
- Born: 15 July 1988 (age 38) Tarnów, Poland
- Height: 1.82 m (6 ft 0 in)
- Weight: 70 kg (154 lb)

Fencing career
- Sport: Fencing
- Country: Poland
- Weapon: Épée
- Hand: Left-handed
- National coach: Bartłomiej Język
- Club: AZS AWF Kraków
- Head coach: Radosław Zawrotniak
- FIE ranking: current ranking
Medal record
Women's épée
Representing Poland
Olympic Games
Bronze medal – third place	2024 Paris	Team
World Championships
Gold medal – first place	2023 Milan	Team
Bronze medal – third place	2017 Leipzig	Team
Bronze medal – third place	2022 Cairo	Team
European Championships
Gold medal – first place	2019 Düsseldorf	Team
Silver medal – second place	2018 Novi Sad	Team
Bronze medal – third place	2013 Zagreb	Individual
Bronze medal – third place	2016 Toruń	Individual

Renata Knapik-Miazga (née Knapik; born 15 July 1988) is a Polish épée fencer. She participated in the 2020 and the 2024 Summer Olympics, winning the bronze medal in the épée team competition at the latter.

== Career ==
Knapik-Miazga took up fencing at a club in Kraków after playing with sticks as a child. When she was 14, she was forbidden by her doctors to continue fencing because of problems with her right hand. She switched her weapon hand and went on. She won both an individual and team bronze medal at the 2007 Junior European Championships, then a silver medal at the 2011 U23 European Championships.

In the senior category she climbed her first World Cup podium in 2010 with a third place in Florina. She was national champion of Poland in 2012 and 2013. At the 2013 European Championships in Zagreb she reached the quarter-finals by defeating Ukraine's Anfisa Pochkalova, then lost to Romania's Ana Maria Brânză and came away with a bronze medal.

Knapik-Miazga studies civil engineering from the Tadeusz Kościuszko University of Technology.

== See also ==
- List of Pennsylvania State University Olympians
