= Kaylin Hsieh =

Hong Kong fencer (born 2001)

Kaylin Hsieh Sin-yan
Personal information
- Born: 19 May 2001 (age 25) Vancouver

Fencing career
- Sport: Fencing
- Country: Hong Kong
- Hand: Right-handed
Medal record
Women's épée fencing
Representing Hong Kong
Asian Games
Silver medal – second place	2022 Hangzhou	Team
Bronze medal – third place	2018 Jakarta	Team
Asian Championships
Silver medal – second place	2018 Bangkok	Team
Silver medal – second place	2023 Wuxi	Team
Silver medal – second place	2026 New Delhi	Individual
Bronze medal – third place	2018 Bangkok	Individual
Bronze medal – third place	2019 Chiba	Team
Bronze medal – third place	2024 Kuwait City	Team
Bronze medal – third place	2025 Bali	Individual
Bronze medal – third place	2025 Bali	Team
Silver medal – second place	2026 New Delhi	Individual
World University Games
Gold medal – first place	2021 Chengdu	Individual
Gold medal – first place	2025 Rhine-Ruhr	Individual
Summer Youth Olympics
Silver medal – second place	2018 Buenos Aires	Individual
Women's fencing
Representing (International Olympic Committee) Mixed-NOCs
Youth Olympic Games
Silver medal – second place	2018 Buenos Aires	Mixed team

Kaylin Hsieh Sin-yan (Chinese: 佘繕妡; Jyutping: se4 sin6 jan1; born 19 May 2001) is a Hong Kong fencer. She won one of the bronze medals in the women's team épée event at the 2018 Asian Games held in Jakarta, Indonesia. In 2021, she represented Hong Kong at the 2020 Summer Olympics in Tokyo, Japan.

In 2018, she also won the silver medal in the girls' épée event at the Summer Youth Olympics held in Buenos Aires, Argentina. At the opening ceremony of the 2018 Summer Youth Olympics, she carried the flag for Hong Kong.

At the 2018 Asian Fencing Championships in Bangkok, Thailand, she won one of the bronze medals in the women's individual épée event. She also won the silver medal in the women's team épée event. In 2019, she won the bronze medal in the women's team épée at the Asian Fencing Championships held in Chiba, Japan.

In 2021, she competed in the women's épée event at the 2020 Summer Olympics in Tokyo, Japan where she was eliminated in her first match by Aizanat Murtazaeva of the ROC.

== Medal record ==
=== Grand Prix ===
Date	Location	Event	Position
2025-01-24	Doha, Qatar	Individual Women's Épée	1st

=== World Cup ===
Date	Location	Event	Position
2024-11-21	Vancouver, Canada	Individual Women's Épée	3rd

=== Asian Championship ===
Year	Location	Event	Position
2018	Bangkok, Thailand	Team Women's Épée	2nd
2018	Bangkok, Thailand	Individual Women's Épée	3rd
2019	Chiba, Japan	Team Women's Épée	3rd
2023	Wuxi, China	Team Women's Épée	2nd
2024	Kuwait City, Kuwait	Team Women's Épée	3rd
2025	Bali, Indonesia	Individual Women's Épée	3rd
2025	Bali, Indonesia	Team Women's Épée	3rd
2026	New Delhi, India	Individual Women's Épée	2nd
