= Thailand at the 2026 Asian Games =

- IOC code: THA
- NOC: National Olympic Committee of Thailand
- Website: olympicthai.org/en/ (in English)

in Aichi–Nagoya, Japan September 19 – October 4, 2026
- Competitors: 694 in 51 sports
- Flag bearers: Chalermcharn Yotviriyapanit; Thatdao Nuekjang
- Medals Ranked 7th: Gold 18 Silver 13 Bronze 21 Total 52

Asian Games appearances (overview)
- 1951; 1954; 1958; 1962; 1966; 1970; 1974; 1978; 1982; 1986; 1990; 1994; 1998; 2002; 2006; 2010; 2014; 2018; 2022; 2026

Thailand competed in the 2026 Asian Games in Nagoya, Japan, from 19 September to 4 October 2026. The delegation will have 694 athletes with the total of 983 personnels including team staffs.

Equestrian Chalermcharn Yotviriyapanit and volleyball player Thatdao Nuekjang were the flagbearers of the opening ceremony.

== Medal summary ==
Medals by sport
Sport	1st place, gold medalist(s)	2nd place, silver medalist(s)	3rd place, bronze medalist(s)	Total
Athletics	3	2	1	6
Teqball	3	0	0	3
Sepak takraw	2	2	0	4
Sailing	2	1	2	5
Taekwondo	1	1	3	5
Esports	1	1	1	3
Equestrian	1	1	0	2
Ju-jitsu	1	0	2	3
Badminton	1	0	1	2
Beach volleyball	1	0	0	1
Boxing	1	0	0	1
Mixed martial arts	1	0	0	1
Weightlifting	0	2	2	4
Canoeing	0	1	1	2
Karate	0	1	1	2
Shooting	0	1	0	1
Golf	0	0	1	1
Kabaddi	0	0	1	1
Kurash	0	0	1	1
Rowing	0	0	1	1
Table tennis	0	0	1	1
Volleyball	0	0	1	1
Water polo	0	0	1	1
Total	18	13	21	52

Medals by date
Date	1st place, gold medalist(s)	2nd place, silver medalist(s)	3rd place, bronze medalist(s)	Total
19 September	Opening ceremony			
20 September	3	1	0	4
21 September	0	0	0	0
22 September	1	0	1	2
23 September	1	2	3	6
24 September	0	1	3	4
25 September	2	2	1	5
26 September	1	1	1	3
27 September	1	0	1	2
28 September	0	1	2	3
29 September	3	1	0	4
30 September	0	1	0	1
1 October	0	1	3	4
2 October	3	0	2	5
3 October	3	2	4	9
Total	18	13	21	52

Medals by gender
Gender	1st place, gold medalist(s)	2nd place, silver medalist(s)	3rd place, bronze medalist(s)	Total
Male	7	3	8	18
Female	8	6	12	26
Mixed	3	4	1	8
Total	18	13	21	52

=== Medalists ===
Medal	Name	Sport	Event	Date
Gold	Jirati Chanliang; Sorrasak Thaosiri	Teqball	Men's doubles	20 September
Gold	Jutatip Kuntatong; Suphawadi Wongkhamchan	Teqball	Women's doubles	20 September
Gold	Phakpong Dejaroen; Suphawadi Wongkhamchan	Teqball	Mixed doubles	20 September
Gold	Kanjutha Phattaraboonsorn	Mixed martial arts	Women's modern 54 kg	22 September
Gold	Supap Khaw-Ngam; Weerapat Pitakanonda; Korntawat Samran; Woraphat Sittiju	Equestrian	Team eventing	23 September
Gold	Manlika Bunthod; Wiphada Chitphuan; Masaya Duangsri; Wilaiwan Khodphom; Athikan Kongkaew; Pruksa Maneewong; Somruedee Pruepruk; Kaewjai Pumsawangkaew; Ratchaneekorn Saeheang; Nipaporn Salupphon; Usa Srikhamlue; Ratsamee Thongsod	Sepak takraw	Women's team regu	25 September
Gold	Puripol Boonson	Athletics	Men's 100 m	25 September
Gold	Joshua Atkinson	Athletics	Men's 400 m	26 September
Gold	Puripol Boonson	Athletics	Men's 200 m	27 September
Gold	Wuttinun Kamsanor; Kritsanapong Nontakote; Tanaphon Sapyen; Phutawan Sopa; Pornthep Tinbangbon	Sepak takraw	Men's regu	29 September
Gold	Nuttawut Muensa; Sathit Thanormchit; Supachai Singkaew; Pawarit Wongthonghatsachai; Phumrapee Wannalertsakul	Esports	PUBG Mobile	29 September
Gold	Kunlavut Vitidsarn	Badminton	Men's singles	29 September
Gold	Sophia Montgomery	Sailing	Women's ILCA 6	2 October
Gold	Worapeerachayakorn Kongphopsarutawadee; Taravadee Naraphornrapat	Beach volleyball	Women's tournament	2 October
Gold	Natnicha Chongprongklang	Boxing	Women's 54 kg	2 October
Gold	Pinchanok Klaysomboon	Sailing	Girls' ILCA 4	3 October
Gold	Orapa Senatham	Ju-jitsu	Women's 63 kg	3 October
Gold	Banlung Tubtimdang	Taekwondo	Men's 68 kg	3 October
Silver	Maneevan Butsuwan	Karate	Women's Kumite +68 kg	20 September
Silver	Woraphat Sittiju	Equestrian	Individual eventing	23 September
Silver	Isarapa Imprasertsuk	Shooting	Women's skeet	23 September
Silver	Wachirawut Changsoi; Jongrak Kampangkaew; Kevin Lemoine; Sahawat Phonngam; Nopparat Pidkwamlab	Esports	Naraka: Bladepoint	24 September
Silver	Wuttinun Kamsanor; Sittipong Khamchan; Kritsanapong Nontakote; Jirasak Pakbuangoen; Pichet Pansan; Marukin Phanmakon; Poottipong Pukdee; Tanaphon Sapyen; Phutawan Sopa; Kritsada Sungvung; Wichan Temkort; Pornthep Tinbangbon	Sepak takraw	Men's team regu	25 September
Silver	Suratwadee Yodsarn	Weightlifting	Women's 57 kg	25 September
Silver	Weeraphon Wichuma	Weightlifting	Men's 75 kg	26 September
Silver	Jirapat Khanonta; Sukanda Petraksa; Supanich Poolkerd; Manatsada Sanmano	Athletics	Women's 4 × 100 m relay	28 September
Silver	Chutithat Pruksorranan; Natawat Iamudom; Jirapat Khanonta; Chayut Khongprasit; Supanich Poolkerd; Puripol Boonson	Athletics	Mixed 4 × 100 m relay	29 September
Silver	Atcharaporn Duanglawa	Canoeing	Women's slalom C-1	30 September
Silver	Navin Pinthasute	Taekwondo	Men's individual poomsae	1 October
Silver	Manlika Bunthod; Wiphada Chitphuan; Masaya Duangsri; Somruedee Pruepruk; Ratchaneekorn Saeheang; Ratsamee Thongsod	Sepak takraw	Women's quadrant	3 October
Silver	Pitipoom Jaroenpon; Worrakan Saksriklom	Sailing	Youth Mixed 420	3 October
Bronze	Pornpun Guedpard; Natthanicha Jaisaen; Sasipaporn Janthawisut; Kaewkalaya Kamulthala; Kalyarat Khamwong; Pimpichaya Kokram; Ajcharaporn Kongyot; Kanyarat Kunmuang; Chatchu-on Moksri; Thatdao Nuekjang; Piyanut Pannoy; Warisara Seetaloed	Volleyball	Women's tournament	22 September
Bronze	Puritat Arree; Chaloempon Charoenkitamorn; Ruttanapak Oupthong; Dechapol Puavaranukroh; Peeratchai Sukphun; Pakkapon Teeraratsakul; Panitchaphon Teeraratsakul; Worrapol Thongsa-nga; Kunlavut Vitidsarn; Tanawat Yimjit	Badminton	Men's team	23 September
Bronze	Teerawat Kangtong	Karate	Men's Kumite +84 kg	23 September
Bronze	Surodchana Khambao	Weightlifting	Women's 53 kg	23 September
Bronze	Parisa Chaempudsa	Rowing	Women's lightweight single sculls	24 September
Bronze	Phanthila Arsayuth; Paranee Chotrotchanaanan; Nattamon Khamma; Nareenun Kittipolpuwarag; Thanita Kongchouy; Pittayaporn Kwantongtanaree; Thanidakarn Kwantongtanaree; Pimpin Ngamcharoensuktaworn; Kritsana Puangtong; Panita Pukkaman; Kanruetai Riangsuntea; Panchita Rodwattanadisakul; Raksina Rueangsappaisan; Sarocha Rueangsappaisan; Janista Thinwilai	Water polo	Women's tournament	24 September
Bronze	Theerapong Silachai	Weightlifting	Men's 60 kg	24 September
Bronze	Theeradet Chaisit; Khomkrit Jittiang; Somboon Kaewkampon; Chayaphon Kamunee; Saharat Phetchui; Nithiphat Phikhrao; Nopphadon Pontaisong; Pramot Saising; Supawit Somrat; Tanongsak Srihera; Wisat Wuttari; Rattanakon Yotsungnoen	Kabaddi	Men's tournament	25 September
Bronze	Tanarak Wongkitikun	Esports	Puyo Puyo Champions	26 September
Bronze	Kunathip Yea-on	Kurash	Men's +90 kg	27 September
Bronze	Subenrat Insaeng	Athletics	Women's discus throw	28 September
Bronze	Orawan Paranang; Suthasini Sawettabut	Table tennis	Women's doubles	28 September
Bronze	Piyanath Koetsuk	Canoeing	Men's slalom C-1	1 October
Bronze	Thitaree Kaewolanwasu	Taekwondo	Women's individual poomsae	1 October
Bronze	Miyu Suzuki	Ju-jitsu	Women's 48 kg	1 October
Bronze	Nuchanat Singchalad	Ju-jitsu	Women's 52 kg	2 October
Bronze	Patcharakan Poolkerd	Taekwondo	Women's 49 kg	2 October
Bronze	Natkamon Wassana	Taekwondo	Women's 57 kg	3 October
Bronze	William McMillan	Sailing	Men's iQFoil	3 October
Bronze	Chanatkan Charoensuk	Sailing	Girls' iQFoil	3 October
Bronze	Sadom Kaewkanjana	Golf	Men's individual	3 October

== Competitors ==
The following is the list of the number of competitors participating at the Games per sport/discipline.

Sport	Men	Women	Total
3x3 basketball	4	4	8
Archery	4	4	8
Artistic swimming	1	9	10
Athletics	19	13	32
Badminton	10	10	20
Baseball	24	0	24
Basketball	0	12	12
Beach volleyball	4	4	8
Boxing	6	5	11
Breaking	2	2	4
Canoeing	9	7	16
Cricket	0	15	15
Cycling	15	9	24
Diving	2	0	2
Equestrian	5	4	9
Esports	29	0	29
Fencing	2	8	10
Field hockey	20	20	40
Football	23	23	46
Golf	3	3	6
Gymnastics	1	7	8
Ju-jitsu	9	6	15
Judo	4	3	7
Kabaddi	12	12	24
Karate	3	5	8
Kurash	2	2	4
Mixed martial arts	1	1	2
Modern pentathlon	2	3	5
Padel	2	2	4
Rowing	9	5	14
Rugby sevens	13	13	26
Sailing	8	8	16
Sepak takraw	12	12	24
Shooting	14	10	24
Skateboarding	4	3	7
Softball	0	17	17
Soft tennis	0	5	5
Sport climbing	4	4	8
Squash	3	1	4
Surfing	2	2	4
Swimming	8	11	19
Table tennis	3	5	8
Taekwondo	5	5	10
Tennis	6	6	12
Teqball	3	2	5
Triathlon	3	3	6
Volleyball	12	12	24
Water polo	15	15	30
Weightlifting	5	5	10
Wrestling	4	0	4
Wushu	5	1	6
Total	356	338	694

== 3x3 basketball ==
Team	Event	Group Stage				Play-ins	Quarterfinal	Semifinal	Final / BM	
Team	Event	Opposition Score	Opposition Score	Opposition Score	Rank	Opposition Score	Opposition Score	Opposition Score	Opposition Score	Rank
Thailand Men's	Men's Tournament	South Korea; L 11–21	Singapore; L 10–21	Japan; L 19–21	4	Did not advance				
Thailand Women's	Women's Tournament	South Korea; L 12–13	Singapore; W 14–8	Indonesia; W 17–4	2 Q	Sri Lanka; W 21–9	Iran; W 12–11	Philippines; L 8–13	South Korea; L 8–21	4

== Archery ==
Compound

Athlete	Event	Ranking round		Round of 64	Round of 32	Round of 16	Quarter-finals	Semi-finals	Final / BM	
Athlete	Event	Score	Rank	Opposition Score	Opposition Score	Opposition Score	Opposition Score	Opposition Score	Opposition Score	Rank
Sirapop Chainak	Men's Individual	700	24	—N/a	Chen C. (TPE); L 145–147	Did not advance				
Sippakorn Kohkaew	Men's Individual	697	29	Did not advance						
Peerawat Rattanapongkiat	Men's Individual	706	12	—N/a	de la Cruz (PHI); L 147–148	Did not advance				
Sirapop Chainak; Sippakorn Kohkaew; Peerawat Rattanapongkiat	Men's Team	1929	8	—N/a		Kazakhstan; L 230–231	Did not advance			
Kanoknapus Kaewchomphu	Women's Individual	701	6	Bye	Gonzales (PHI); W 149–144	Mat Salleh (MAS); L 146–147	Did not advance			
Kanyavee Maneesombatkul	Women's Individual	696	18	Bye	Chen Y. (TPE); L 143–145	Did not advance				
Chaniddapa Thanaratpitinan	Women's Individual	651	47	Did not advance						
Kanoknapus Kaewchomphu; Kanyavee Maneesombatkul; Chaniddapa Thanaratpitinan	Women's Team	2048	11	—N/a		Iran; W 231–231	South Korea; L 230–230	Did not advance		
Peerawat Rattanapongkiat; Kanyavee Maneesombatkul	Mixed Team	1348	6	—N/a		Philippines; W 159–154	Vietnam; W 156–153	India; L 155–156	China; L 154–158	4

Recurve

Athlete	Event	Ranking round		Round of 64	Round of 32	Round of 16	Quarter-finals	Semi-finals	Final / BM	
Athlete	Event	Score	Rank	Opposition Score	Opposition Score	Opposition Score	Opposition Score	Opposition Score	Opposition Score	Rank
Tanakorn Thanaathiwat	Men's Individual	624	51	Alif (BAN); L 0–6	Did not advance					
Punika Jongkraijak	Women's Individual	559	44	Alawadhi (UAE); W 6–5	Kang (KOR); L 1–7	Did not advance				
Tanakorn Thanaathiwat; Punika Jongkraijak	Mixed Team	1183	19	—N/a	Bangladesh; L 0–6	Did not advance				

== Artistic swimming ==
Athlete	Event	Final				
Athlete	Event	Acrobatic	Technical	Free	Total	Rank
Patrawee Chayawararak; Thunyaporn Homnan	Women's Duet	—N/a	221.7158	202.2504	423.9662	7
Patrawee Chayawararak; Thunyaporn Homnan; Sasipa Kijkanokudomdesh; ฺBrazil Na Songkhla; Chanathan Pariyanupat; Natnicha Rungtananukorn; Getsarin Sawangarom; Pimyada Sinsuppharoek; Napatcha Varasai; Nichapat Wongsto	Team	152.8570	206.0995	158.5823	517.5388	5

== Athletics ==
Track events

Athlete	Event	Heat		Semi-finals		Final	
Athlete	Event	Result	Rank	Result	Rank	Result	Rank
Puripol Boonson	Men's 100 m	9.95	1 Q	9.91	1 Q	9.90	1st place, gold medalist(s)
Chutithat Pruksorranan	Men's 100 m	10.48	4 Q	10.53	8	Did not advance	
Puripol Boonson	Men's 200 m	20.97	1 Q	20.10	1 Q	19.88	1st place, gold medalist(s)
Thawatchai Himaiad	Men's 200 m	21.19	2 Q	20.97	3	Did not advance	
Joshua Atkinson	Men's 400 m	45.30	1 Q	—N/a		44.90	1st place, gold medalist(s)
Sarawut Nuansi	Men's 400 m	46.25	4	—N/a		Did not advance	
Puripol Boonson; Soraoat Dapbang; Thawatchai Himaiad; Chutithat Pruksorranan	Men's 4 × 100 m relay	38.89	2 Q	—N/a		38.49	4
Joshua Atkinson; Khunaphat Kaijan; Sarawut Nuansi; Adisak Pornsomphot	Men's 4 × 400 m relay	3:03.07	4 Q	—N/a		3:01.99	4

Athlete	Event	Heat		Semi-finals		Final	
Athlete	Event	Result	Rank	Result	Rank	Result	Rank
Jirapat Khanonta	Women's 100 m	11.45	1 Q	11.41	1 Q	11.46	5
Sukanda Petraksa	Women's 100 m	11.54	3 Q	11.47	3 Q	11.48	6
Jirapat Khanonta	Women's 200 m	23.58	2 Q	—N/a		23.65	8
Sukanda Petraksa	Women's 200 m	23.94	6	—N/a		Did not advance	
Benny Nontanam	Women's 400 m	54.35	4	—N/a		Did not advance	
Jirapat Khanonta; Sukanda Petraksa; Supanich Poolkerd; Manatsada Sanmano	Women's 4 × 100 m relay	43.65	2 Q	—N/a		43.51	2nd place, silver medalist(s)

Athlete	Event	Heat		Final	
Athlete	Event	Time	Rank	Time	Rank
Chayut Khongprasit; Chutithat Pruksorranan; Jirapat Khanonta; Supanich Poolkerd	Mixed 4 × 100 m relay	41.48	1 Q	40.87	2nd place, silver medalist(s)
Khunaphat Kaijan; Adisak Pornsomphot; Benny Nontanam; Phichayapha Sukaue	Mixed 4 × 400 m relay	3:23.94	5	Did not advance	

Field events

Athlete	Event	Final	
Athlete	Event	Result	Rank
Kittipong Boonmawan	Men's Hammer Throw	60.55	15
Tawan Kaeodam	Men's High Jump	2.18	5
Patsapong Amsam-ang	Men's Pole Vault	5.60	4

Athlete	Event	Final	
Athlete	Event	Result	Rank
Subenrat Insaeng	Women's Discus Throw	61.43	3rd place, bronze medalist(s)
Parinya Chuaimaroeng	Women's Triple Jump	12.91	12

== Badminton ==
Athlete	Event	Round of 64	Round of 32	Round of 16	Quarter-finals	Semi-finals	Final	
Athlete	Event	Opposition Score	Opposition Score	Opposition Score	Opposition Score	Opposition Score	Opposition Score	Rank
Panitchaphon Teeraratsakul	Men's Singles	Hoh (MAS); WDN	Did not advance					
Kunlavut Vitidsarn	Men's Singles	Bye	Pui (MAC); W 2–0	Nguyễn (VIE); W 2–0	Ng (HKG); W 2–1	Farhan (INA); W 2–0	Loh (SGP); W 2–0	1st place, gold medalist(s)
Chaloempon Charoenkitamorn; Worrapol Thongsa-nga	Men's Doubles	—N/a	Luangamath / Sokthavy (LAO); W 2–0	Liang / Wang (CHN); L 0–2	Did not advance			
Peeratchai Sukphun; Pakkapon Teeraratsakul	Men's Doubles	—N/a	Rankireddy / Shetty (IND); W 2–1	Carnando / Marthin (INA); L 0–2	Did not advance			
Puritat Arree; Chaloempon Charoenkitamorn; Ruttanapak Oupthong; Dechapol Puavaranukroh; Peeratchai Sukphun; Pakkapon Teeraratsakul; Panitchaphon Teeraratsakul; Worrapol Thongsa-nga; Kunlavut Vitidsarn; Tanawat Yimjit	Men's Team	—N/a		Macau; W 3–0	Chinese Taipei; W 3–1	Indonesia; L 1–3	Did not advance	3rd place, bronze medalist(s)
Pornpawee Chochuwong	Women's Singles	Bye	Lin (TPE); L 0–2	Did not advance				
Ratchanok Intanon	Women's Singles	Bye	Kim (PRK); W 2–0	Yeo (SGP); W 2–0	An (KOR); L 0–2	Did not advance		
Nuntakarn Aimsaard; Jhenicha Sudjaipraparat	Women's Doubles	—N/a	A. Abdul Razzaq / F. Abdul Razzaq (MDV); W 2–0	Yeung N. / Yeung P. (HKG); L 1–2	Did not advance			
Hathaithip Mijad; Napapakorn Tungkasatan	Women's Doubles	—N/a	Kim / Yu (PRK); W 2–0	Muralitharan / Tan (MAS); L 0–2	Did not advance			
Benyapa Aimsaard; Nuntakarn Aimsaard; Pornpawee Chochuwong; Ratchanok Intanon; Supanida Katethong; Hathaithip Mijad; Pitchamon Opatniputh; Supissara Paewsampran; Jhenicha Sudjaipraparat; Napapakorn Tungkasatan	Womens' Team	—N/a		Bye	China; L 0–3	Did not advance		
Ruttanapak Oupthong; Jhenicha Sudjaipraparat	Mixed Doubles	—N/a	Kulmatov / Zhumabek (KAZ); W 2–0	Joaquin / Ramadhanti (INA); W 2–1	Ye / Chan (TPE); L 0–2	Did not advance		
Dechapol Puavaranukroh; Supissara Paewsampran	Mixed Doubles	—N/a	Watanabe / Taguchi (JPN); L 0–2	Did not advance				

== Baseball ==
Team	Event	Preliminary round				Placement Round			Final / BM	
Team	Event	Opposition Score	Opposition Score	Opposition Score	Rank	Opposition Score	Opposition Score	Rank	Opposition Score	Rank
Thailand Men's	Men's Tournament	Hong Kong; W 10–7	Chinese Taipei; L 0–15	South Korea; L 1–18	3	Philippines; L 7–18	Palestine; W 1–0	6	Did not advance	

== Basketball ==
Team	Event	Group Stage			Quarterfinal	Semifinal	Final / BM	
Team	Event	Opposition Score	Opposition Score	Rank	Opposition Score	Opposition Score	Opposition Score	Rank
Thailand women's	Women's tournament	Indonesia; L 52–61	China; L 46–111	3 Q	Japan; L 29–86	Did not advance		

Team roster

- Pattanamon Patthanauckkaranon
- Phantira Phanbot
- Supavadee Kunchuan
- Rattika Tojaruen
- Yanisa Thankhokkruad
- Sasiporn Wongtapha
- Sarah Tuukkanen
- Worakarn Wongwisetsak
- Mathurot Dangdee
- Chosita Sakaret
- Laksamee Hewchaiyaphum
- Priscilla Jensen

Preliminary Rounds – Group A

Pos	Team	Pld	W	L	PF	PA	PD	Pts	Qualification
1	China	2	2	0	221	87	+134	4	Quarterfinals
2	Indonesia	2	1	1	102	162	−60	3	Quarterfinals
3	Thailand	2	0	2	98	172	−74	2	Quarterfinals

Source: aichi-nagoya2026.org

17 September 2026
13:00

Report
Result

Indonesia	61–52	Thailand
Scoring by quarter: 14–13, 22–13, 13–11, 12–15
Pts: Pierre-Louis 14; Rebs: Pierre-Louis 16; Asts: Pierre-Louis 6		Pts: Kunchuan 20; Rebs: Jensen 6 Asts: Kunchuan 4

Aichi International Arena, Nagoya
Attendance: 4,488
Referees: Ami Takano (JPN), Yuen Chun Yip (HKG), Yana Nikogossyan (KAZ)

19 September 2026
10:00

Report
Result

Thailand	46–111	China
Scoring by quarter: 14–33, 14–24, 10–24, 8–30
Pts: Wongtapha 18; Rebs: Jensen 5 Asts: Wongtapha 3		Pts: Luo, Chen Y.J. 16; Rebs: Chen M.L. 9 Asts: Zhang 6

Aichi International Arena, Nagoya
Attendance: 4,382
Referees: Mahsa Kargari (IRN), Mandy Ngieng (MAS), Ami Takano (JPN)

== Beach volleyball ==
Athlete	Event	Group stage				Round of 16	Quarter-finals	Semi-finals	Final / BM	
Athlete	Event	Oppositions Score	Oppositions Score	Oppositions Score	Rank	Oppositions Score	Oppositions Score	Oppositions Score	Oppositions Score	Rank
Wachirawit Muadpha; Netitorn Muneekul	Men	Al-Housni / Al-Mamari (OMA); W 2–0	Fernandes / Savio (TLS); W 2–0	Aghajanighasab / Pourasgari (IRI); L 0–2	2 Q	Taovalo / Tipjan (THA); L 0–2	Did not advance			
Poravid Taovalo; Pithak Tipjan	Men	Andibuduge / Pathirannahalage (SRI); W 2–0	Bae / Oh (KOR); W 2–0	Mou / Zainalabidin (QAT); W 2–0	1 Q	Muadpha / Muneekul (THA); W 2–0	Bogatu / Gurin (KAZ); W 2–0	Janko / Samba (QAT); L 0–2	Kurosawa / Mizumachi (JPN); L 1–2	4
Worapeerachayakorn Kongphopsarutawadee; Taravadee Naraphornrapat	Women	Kim / Shin (KOR); W 2–0	Goh R. / Goh Y. (MAS); W 2–0	—N/a	1 Q	Karimova / Ryukhova (KAZ); W 2–0	Pons / Rondina (PHI); W 2–1	Pagara / Progella (PHI); W 2–0	Xia / Yan (CHN); W 2–1	1st place, gold medalist(s)
Salinda Mungkhon; Patcharaporn Seehawong	Women	Hashim / Ismail (QAT); W 2–0	Alawaththage / Kumbure (SRI); W 2–0	Tsang / Wong (HKG); W 2–0	1 Q	Đinh / Mai (VIE); W 2–0	Cao / Dong (CHN); L 0–2	Did not advance		

== Boxing ==
Athlete	Event	Round of 32	Round of 16	Quarter-finals	Semi-finals	Final	Rank
Athlete	Event	Opposition Result	Opposition Result	Opposition Result	Opposition Result	Opposition Result	Rank
Kangpi Bokhunthod	Men's 55 kg	Rozmetov (TKM); W 5–0	Olimov (UZB); W 3–2	Kharkhuu (MGL); L 0–5	Did not advance		
Sakda Ruamtham	Men's 60 kg	Hossain (BAN); W 5–0	Shahbakhsh (IRI); W 4–1	Jang (KOR); L 2–3	Did not advance		
Bunjong Sinsiri	Men's 70 kg	Sumit (IND); L 0–5	Did not advance				
Weerapon Jongjoho	Men's 80 kg	—N/a	Wang (CHN); L 0–5	Did not advance			
Jakkapong Yomkhot	Men's 90 kg	—N/a	Nepal (NEP); W 5–0	Han (CHN); L 0–5	Did not advance		
Adthapong Saengtep	Men's +90 kg	—N/a	Bye	Narender (IND); L RSC	Did not advance		
Chuthamat Raksat	Women's 51 kg	Bye	Kazakova (UZB); L 0–5	Did not advance			
Natnicha Chongprongklang	Women's 54 kg	Bye	Pasuit (PHI); W 5–0	Uktamova (UZB); W 3–2	Namiki (JPN); W 3–2	Pang (PRK); W 4–1	1st place, gold medalist(s)
Punrawee Ruenros	Women's 60 kg	—N/a	Yang (CHN); L 2–3	Did not advance			
Janjaem Suwannapheng	Women's 65 kg	—N/a	Hoàng (VIE); W 5–0	Chen (TPE); L 0–5	Did not advance		
Porntip Buapa	Women's 75 kg	—N/a		Bao (CHN); L 0–5	Did not advance		

== Breaking ==
Athlete	Event	Pre-selection		Round of 16	Quarter-finals	Semi-finals	Final	Rank
Athlete	Event	Point	Rank	Opposition Score	Opposition Score	Opposition Score	Opposition Score	Rank
Pongsak Buntanom	B-Boys	61.13	16 Q	Nakarai S. (JPN); L 0–2	Did not advance			
Nattaphol Padkhamwong	B-Boys	67.61	14 Q	Kim (KOR); L 0–2	Did not advance			
Vacharapa Orankicharoen	B-Girls	54.34	13 Q	Nakarai A. (JPN); L 0–2	Did not advance			
Thanawadee Suthisiri	B-Girls	52.53	14 Q	Fukushima (JPN); L 0–2	Did not advance			

== Canoeing ==
Slalom

Athlete	Event	Heats		Quarter-finals		Semi-finals		Final / Final B	
Athlete	Event	Time	Rank	Time	Rank	Time	Rank	Time	Rank
Piyanath Koetsuk	Men's C-1	119.92	6 Q	—N/a		116.53	8 Q	121.68	3rd place, bronze medalist(s)
Chonlasit Phuttraksa	Men's C-1	125.58	7 Q	—N/a		126.38	9	Did not advance	
Piyanath Koetsuk	Men's K-1	109.75	7 Q	—N/a		118.51	9 Q	164.27	8
Janyawut Mangjit	Men's K-1	125.78	9 Q	—N/a		118.57	10	Did not advance	
Piyanath Koetsuk	Men's Kayak Cross	81.01	11 Q	—	2 Q	—	4 FB	—	3
Janyawut Mangjit	Men's Kayak Cross	FLT	17	Did not advance					
Atcharaporn Duanglawa	Women's C-1	140.75	5 Q	—N/a		122.51	2 Q	125.85	2nd place, silver medalist(s)
Jaruwan Niamthong	Women's C-1	DNF	– Q	—N/a		DNF	–	Did not advance	
Atcharaporn Duanglawa	Women's K-1	234.54	10 Q	—N/a		248.47	11	Did not advance	
Jaruwan Niamthong	Women's K-1	124.89	6 Q	—N/a		120.74	7 Q	164.67	6
Rungthip Kumrat	Women's Kayak Cross	83.17	8 Q	—	3	Did not advance			
Jaruwan Niamthong	Women's Kayak Cross	82.87	6 Q	—	2 Q	—	3 FB	—	4

Qualification Legend: FA=Final A (medal); FB=Final B (non-medal)

Sprint

Athlete	Event	Heats		Semi-finals		Final / Final B	
Athlete	Event	Time	Rank	Time	Rank	Time	Rank
Pitpiboon Mahawattanangkul; Mongkhonchai Sisong	Men's C-2 500 m	—N/a				1:48.584	6
Natthaphat Chaichanthuek	Men's K-1 500 m	2:02.214	7 q	1:55.033	5 FB	1:56.339	2
Aditep Srichart; Nathaworn Waenphrom	Men's K-2 500 m	1:42.920	6 q	1:43.605	6 FB	1:40.178	2
Praison Buasamrong; Natthaphat Chaichanthuek; Aditep Srichart; Nathaworn Waenphrom	Men's K-4 500 m	1:31.229	5 q	1:33.234	3 FA	1:30.599	9
Orasa Thiangkathok	Women's C-1 200 m	48.795	3 FA	Bye		48.329	6
Aphinya Sroichit; Orasa Thiangkathok	Women's C-2 500 m	2:05.101	3 FA	Bye		2:01.662	5
Pornnapphan Phuangmaiming; Panwad Thongnim	Women's K-2 500 m	2:02.383	5 q	1:55.417	2 FA	2:01.033	8
Pitpiboon Mahawattanangkul; Aphinya Sroichit	Mixed C-2 500 m	—N/a				1:55.795	6
Nathaworn Waenphrom; Panwad Thongnim	Mixed K-2 500 m	1:51.411	4 q	1:55.896	3 FA	1:47.514	8

Qualification Legend: FA=Final A (medal); FB=Final B (non-medal)

== Cricket ==
Team	Event	Quarter-final	Semi-final	Final / BM	
Team	Event	Opposition Score	Opposition Score	Opposition Score	Rank
Thailand women's	Women's tournament	Pakistan; L 91/4–92/7	Did not advance		

=== Women's tournament ===
Squad

- Naruemol Chaiwai (c, wk)
- Thanrada Seesawan
- Chanida Sutthiruang
- Nannaphat Chaihan
- Natthakan Chantham
- Phannita Maya
- Aphisara Suwanchonrathi
- Sunida Chaturongrattana
- Onnicha Kamchomphu
- Suleeporn Laomi
- Thipatcha Putthawong
- Nannapat Koncharoenkai
- Koranit Suwanchonrathi
- Pattamawadee Suriya
- Chayanisa Phengpaen

Quarter-finals

Quarter-final 2
17 September 2026
14:00
Scorecard

Thailand; 91/4 (11 overs)	v	Pakistan; 92/7 (10.4 overs)
Nannapat Koncharoenkai 49 (38); Fatima Sana 2/22 (3 overs)		Shawaal Zulfiqar 25 (14); Onnicha Kamchomphu 3/37 (3 overs)

Pakistan won by 3 wickets
Kōrogi Sports Park, Nisshin
Umpires: Shivani Mishra (Qat) and Nimali Perera (SL)

- Pakistan won the toss and elected to field.
- The match was reduced to 11 overs per side due to rain.

== Cycling ==
BMX freestyle

Athlete	Event	Qualification		Final	
Athlete	Event	Time	Rank	Time	Rank
Rungrueang Phamee	Men's Park	39.10	3 Q	54.20	7
Saithan Phetnum	Men's Park	51.90	2 Q	60.80	6

BMX racing

Athlete	Event	Motos						
Athlete	Event	Run 1	Run 2	Run 3	Result	Rank	Final	Rank
Putthaphum Nakpaen	Men's Race	30.705	DNF	31.044	11	5 Q	38.581	6
Komet Sukprasert	Men's Race	30.437	31.073	30.189	5	3 Q	DNF	8
Hathaipech Jaisawang	Women's Race	37.559	37.785	37.963	13	8 Q	36.917	7
Chutikan Kitwanitsathian	Women's Race	36.604	36.580	36.088	9	6 Q	36.269	6

Mountain biking

Athlete	Event	Final	
Athlete	Event	Time	Rank
Pongpeera Pongaryukun	Men's Cross-country	LAP	
Phunsiri Sirimongkhon	Men's Cross-country	1:34:15	10
Pinpak Chiengsuan	Women's Cross-country	LAP	
Pornpak Praphothang	Women's Cross-country	LAP	

Road

Athlete	Event	Final	
Athlete	Event	Time	Rank
Athit Poulard	Men's Individual Time Trial	43:55.98	6
Thanakhan Chaiyasombat	Men's Road Race	4:27:38	17
Peerapol Chawchiangkwang	Men's Road Race	4:32:48	22
Sarawut Sirironnachai	Men's Road Race	4:32:48	23
Phetdarin Somrat	Women's Individual Time Trial	39:50.48	8
Chaniporn Batriya	Women's Road Race	2:53:57	9
Kamonrada Khaoplot	Women's Road Race	DNF	
Phetdarin Somrat	Women's Road Race	2:59:49	24

Track
Keirin

Athlete	Event	Heats		Repechage		Semi-finals		Final	
Athlete	Event	Result	Rank	Result	Rank	Result	Rank	Result	Rank
Jai Angsuthasawit	Men's Keirin	10.284	3	10.699	5	Did not advance			
Norasetthada Bunma	Men's Keirin	11.398	6	10.690	3	10.780	6	11.140	11

Omnium

Athlete	Event	Scratch		Tempo		Elimination		Points race		Total points	Rank
Athlete	Event	Points	Rank	Points	Rank	Points	Rank	Points	Rank	Total points	Rank
Warut Paekrathok	Men's Omnium	14	14	–26	14	ABD					
Jutatip Maneephan	Women's Omnium	26	8	–22	12	24	9	–60	12	–32	12

Sprint

Athlete	Event	Qualification		1/16 finals	Repechage	1/8 finals	Quarter-finals	Semi-finals	Final	
Athlete	Event	Time	Rank	Opposition Result	Opposition Result	Opposition Result	Opposition Result	Opposition Result	Opposition Result	Rank
Jai Angsuthasawit	Men's Sprint	9.666	5	Oh (KOR); W 10.873–11.036	—N/a	Kang (TPE); W 10.552–10.564	Xie (CHN); W, L, W	Ota (JPN); L, L	Awang (MAS); DNF, L	4
Norasetthada Bunma	Men's Sprint	10.078	16	Ota (JPN); L 10.486–10.480	Sahrom (MAS); L 10.692–10.687	Did not advance				
Jai Angsuthasawit; Norasetthada Bunma; Yeaunyong Petcharat; Sirawit Saensai	Men's Team Sprint	DNF		Did not advance						

== Diving ==
Athlete	Event	Preliminary		Final	
Athlete	Event	Score	Rank	Score	Rank
Chawanwat Juntaphadawon	Men's 1 m Springboard	—N/a		270.90	8
Thitipoom Marksin	Men's 3 m Springboard	264.70	13	Did not advance	
Chawanwat Juntaphadawon; Thitipoom Marksin	Men's Synchronized 3 m Springboard	—N/a		311.25	6

== Equestrian ==
Dressage

Athlete	Horse	Event	1st Qualifier		2nd Qualifier		Freestyle	
Athlete	Horse	Event	Score (%)	Rank	Score (%)	Rank	Score (%)	Rank
Nynn Puttisomba	Rock That Tango	Dressage Individual	68.500	6	69.324	3	73.570	6
Chanjanok Ruecker	Vincent 186	Dressage Individual	66.000	23	64.059	25	—N/a	
HRH Princess Sirivannavari	Boulevard	Dressage Individual	60.265	41	60.971	37	—N/a	
Chalermcharn Yotviriyapanit	Sant Jordi 3	Dressage Individual	EL		—N/a			
Nynn Puttisomba; Chanjanok Ruecker; HRH Princess Sirivannavari; Chalermcharn Yotviriyapanit	See above	Dressage Team	194.765	8	—N/a			

Eventing

Athlete	Horse	Event	Dressage		Jumping		Cross-country		Total	Rank
Athlete	Horse	Event	Score	Rank	Score	Rank	Score	Rank	Total	Rank
Supap Khaw-Ngam	Vinetto 3	Eventing Individual	35.30	13	47.30	25	93.70	22	93.70	22
Weerapat Pitakanonda	Carnival March	Eventing Individual	36.50	17	40.50	16	40.50	8	40.50	8
Korntawat Samran	Billy Elmy	Eventing Individual	29.70	2	39.30	13	39.30	6	39.30	6
Woraphat Sittiju	Uster de Chanay	Eventing Individual	30.10	4	30.10	2	30.10	2	30.10	2nd place, silver medalist(s)
Supap Khaw-Ngam; Weerapat Pitakanonda; Korntawat Samran; Woraphat Sittiju	See above	Eventing Team	95.10	2	109.90	3	109.90	1	109.90	1st place, gold medalist(s)

== Esports ==
Athlete	Event	Group stage					Quarter-finals	Semi-finals	Final	
Athlete	Event	Opposition Score	Opposition Score	Opposition Score	Opposition Score	Rank	Opposition Score	Opposition Score	Opposition Score	Rank
Teerat Limprapat; Sirawut Rungratkasikul	eFootball	Palestine; W 2–0	Japan; D 0–0	—N/a		2 Q	Malaysia; L 0–2	Did not advance		
Akkarapon Amnuayphon; Kantinun Asawarungsaengkul; Weeravat Baolorphet; Prasitthichai Jiadchat; Piyaphong Parwthaisong; Ratchakit Wanasiriporn	Honor of Kings	Indonesia; L 0–2	Hong Kong; L 0–2	—N/a		3	Did not advance			
Wachirawut Changsoi; Jongrak Kampangkaew; Kevin Lemoine; Sahawat Phonngam; Nopparat Pidkwamlab	Naraka: Bladepoint	Malaysia; W 2–0	Indonesia; W 2–0	China; L 0–2	—N/a	2 Q	—N/a	Vietnam; W 3–2	China; L 0–3	2nd place, silver medalist(s)
Tanarak Wongkitikun	Puyo Puyo Champions	Kuo (TPE); L 0–3	Koh (SGP); W 3–0	Ganbold (MGL); W 3–2	Paritosh (IND); W 3–2	2 Q	Gonzalvo (PHI); W 5–2	Kurihara (JPN); L 1–10	Did not advance	3rd place, bronze medalist(s)
Panachai Aruntanavong; Tachin Danchoho; Anusorn Karaket; Tinnapop Malai; Natchanon Rueangwettiwong; Varit Tangpong; Chuapong Wachirametharuch	Identity V	Philippines; W 2–0	Indonesia; W 2–0	Chinese Taipei; L 1–2	—N/a	2 Q	Japan; L 0–2	Did not advance		
Sitta Chantasriviroje; Nopparut Hempamorn; Ekkarat Sumalai	Competitive Martial Arts (Note: Covers three titles: Street Fighter 6, Tekken 8, The King of Fighters XV – This is a team competition with only one medal to be awarded.)	Pakistan; W 3–1	Chinese Taipei; L 2–3	Syria; W 3–0	—N/a	1 Q	Hong Kong; L 2–3	Did not advance		

Athlete	Event	Match 1	Match 2	Match 3	Match 4	Match 5	Match 6	Match 7	Match 8	Match 9	Match 10	Match 11	Match 12	WWCD	Total	Rank
Athlete	Event	Result	Result	Result	Result	Result	Result	Result	Result	Result	Result	Result	Result	WWCD	Total	Rank
Nattawut Muensa; Supachai Singkaew; Sathit Thanormchit; Phumrapee Wannaletsakul; Pawarit Wongthonghatsachai	PUBG Mobile	5	17	3	14	13	23	8	21	0	7	14	3	3	128	1st place, gold medalist(s)

== Fencing ==
Athlete	Event	Preliminaries		Round of 32	Round of 16	Quarter-finals	Semi-finals	Final	
Athlete	Event	Opposition Score	Rank	Opposition Score	Opposition Score	Opposition Score	Opposition Score	Opposition Score	Rank
Notethakod Wangpaisit	Men's Foil	Cheung (HKG) L 4–5; Kravtsov (UZB) L 2–5; Nasser (KUW) L 1–5; Lam (MAC) W 5–4; Owaida (QAT) L 4–5	6 Q	Cheong (MAC); W 15–13	Robson (SGP); L 9–15	Did not advance			
Voragun Srinualnad	Men's Sabre	Singh (IND) W 5–2; Tsumori (JPN) W 5–4; Shen (CHN) W 5–3; Tahla (JOR) W 5–4	1 Q	Bye	Shen (CHN); L 6–15	Did not advance			
Natpapat Sangngio	Women's Épée	Lim (KOR) L 3–5; Khatri (IND) W 5–4; Damdinpurev (MGL) W 5–4; Bakaldina (KAZ) L 1–5; Alhosani (UAE) W 5–4	4 Q	Khatri (IND); L 10–15	Did not advance				
Mooktapa Thiankul	Women's Épée	Al Daghishi (OMA) L 4–5; Al-Refae (KUW) W 5–3; Yoshimura (JPN) L 3–5; Kiria (SGP) L 1–5; Hsieh (HKG) L 2–5	6	Did not advance					
Tonkhaw Phokaew	Women's Sabre	Nicanor (PHI) W 5–1; Agustina (INA) L 4–5; Jeon (KOR) L 4–5; Kaneko (JPN) L 3–5; Sit (HKG) L 4–5	4 Q	Dalmacio (PHI); L 14–15	Did not advance				
Arisara Somphao	Women's Sabre	Sazanjian (IRI) W 5–2; Kim (KOR) L 1–5; Dayibekova (UZB) L 1–5; Sarybay (KAZ) L 3–5; Bhavani (IND) L 2–5	6	Did not advance					
Chanyanuch Klaiduang; Pornchita Puengkuntod; Natpapat Sangngio; Mooktapa Thiankul	Women's Team Épée	—N/a			Hong Kong; L 27–45	Did not advance			
Tonkhaw Phokaew; Poonyanuch Pithakduangkamol; Arisara Somphao; Peempat Wongthongsri	Women's team Sabre	—N/a			Kazakhstan; L 32–45	Did not advance			

== Field hockey ==
Team	Event	Group Stage						Placement match			Semi-final	Final	
Team	Event	Opposition Score	Opposition Score	Opposition Score	Opposition Score	Opposition Score	Rank	Opposition Score	Opposition Score	Rank	Opposition Score	Opposition Score	Rank
Men's team	Men's tournament	Pakistan; L 0–9	China; L 1–8	Malaysia; L 0–10	Oman; W 1–0	Uzbekistan; W 3–1	4	Japan; L 1–9	Bangladesh; L 0–3	8	Did not advance		
Women's team	Women's tournament	Singapore; W 2–0	Uzbekistan; W 3–1	India; L 1–20	Indonesia; L 0–1	Japan; L 0–3	3	Chinese Taipei; W 2–1	Malaysia; L 0–4	6	Did not advance		

=== Men's tournament ===
Team squads

The following is the Thailand roster in the men's field hockey tournament of the 2026 Asian Games.

Head Coach: (Malaysia) Tai Beng Hai

5. Kritsada Chueamkaew
8. Narentorn Deesa
9. Udomchok Phokphun
10. Jiranat Sae-Aew
11. Nopphadon Samarng
12. Pichet Chaimanee
13. Worawut Kaeochianghwang
14. Warakorn Kiram
15. Natthawat Kuengsamrong
16. Nithikon Mongsri
19. Arfis Hayeeda-Oh
20. Borirak Harapan
22. Chanachol Rungniyom
23. Suriya Kasonbua
28. Kankawee Boonsri
29. Tanakit Juntakian (C)
31. Patinya Panseemek (GK)
32. Thawin Phomjunt (GK)
33. Kunakorn Jaitas
38. Konlawat Khammi

Preliminary round

Pos	Team	Pld	W	D	L	GF	GA	GD	Pts	Qualification
1	Malaysia	5	5	0	0	34	4	+30	15	Semi-finals
2	Pakistan	5	4	0	1	28	8	+20	12	Semi-finals
3	China	5	3	0	2	13	10	+3	9	Fifth place classification
4	Thailand	5	2	0	3	5	28	−23	6	Fifth place classification
5	Uzbekistan	5	1	0	4	6	20	−14	3	Ninth place game
6	Oman	5	0	0	5	4	20	−16	0	Eleventh place game

Source: FIH
Rules for classification: 1) points; 2) matches won; 3) goal difference; 4) goals for; 5) head-to-head result; 6) field goals for.

20 September 2026
19:00

Pakistan	9–0	Thailand
Shakeel 8'; Butt 12'; Nadeem 20', 37', 43'; Khan 22', 23'; Rana 31'; Shahid 34'	Report

Gifu Prefectural Green Stadium
Umpires:
Akalanka Ishan Kumara (SRI)
You Hyo-sik (KOR)

22 September 2026
13:00

Thailand	1–8	China
Chaimanee 53'	Report	Gao 12', 44', 56'; Chen 13'; Zhang 30'; He 40', 52'; Zhao 55'

Gifu Prefectural Green Stadium
Umpires:
Rawi Anbananthan (MAS)
Daulet Urmanov (UZB)

24 September 2026
09:00

Thailand	0–10	Malaysia
	Report	Fa. Saari 18', 35'; Abdu Rauf 20'; Azrai 21', 41'; Mohd Zain 28'; Hamsani 35'; Silverius 55'; Jali 59'; Anuar 60'

Gifu Prefectural Green Stadium
Umpires:
Khalid Hussain (HKG)
Lim Hong-Zhen (SGP)

26 September 2026
09:00

Oman	0–1	Thailand
	Report	Juntakian 57'

Gifu Prefectural Green Stadium
Umpires:
Akalanka Ishan Kumara (SRI)
Kim Yoon-seon (KOR)

28 September 2026
13:00

Uzbekistan	1–3	Thailand
Komilov 43'	Report	Chueamkaew 5'; Khammi 14'; Hayeeda-Oh 15'

Gifu Prefectural Green Stadium
Umpires:
Deepak Joshi (IND)
You Hyo-sik (KOR)

Fifth place Crossover

1 October 2026
11:30

Japan	9–1	Thailand
Fujishima 3', 29'; T. Tanaka 12', 17', 25', 41'; Kawabe 14', 52'; Yamasaki 22'	Report	Kuengsamrong 53'

Gifu Prefectural Green Stadium
Umpires:
Zhou Fuyi (CHN)
James Unkles (AUS)

Seventh place match

3 October 2026
11:30

Thailand	0–3	Bangladesh
	Report	Sarkar 3'; Am. Islam 27'; As. Islam 53'

Gifu Prefectural Green Stadium
Umpires:
Hideki Kinoshita (JPN)
Deepak Joshi (IND)

=== Women's tournament ===
Team squads

The following is the Thailand roster in the women's field hockey tournament of the 2026 Asian Games.

Head Coach: (South Korea) Young Wook Bae

3. Kaewkan Promma
4. Suwapat Konthong
6. Wananchaporn Kammoon
7. Kunjira Inpa
8. Sudarat Noo-Keaw
9. Arucha Komolwit
10. Thanaphon Khamnon
11. Trinetr Jirapitsatja
13. Supansa Samanso
14. Sawita Kakkaeo
15. Songkran Pasawat (C)
17. Nadia Smeelen
18. Siraya Yimkrajang (GK)
20. Watsana Saetan (GK)
21. Kwanruedee Saoyod
22. Kornkanok Waeojingrit
23. Pattheera Tasaeng
26. Wooju Jeong
28. Voramon Inthanaphichit
33. Ariya Mock

Preliminary round

Pos	Team	Pld	W	D	L	GF	GA	GD	Pts	Qualification
1	India	5	5	0	0	66	3	+63	15	Semi-finals
2	Japan (H)	5	4	0	1	23	4	+19	12	Semi-finals
3	Thailand	5	2	0	3	6	25	−19	6	Fifth place classification
4	Indonesia	5	2	0	3	6	27	−21	6	Fifth place classification
5	Singapore	5	1	0	4	4	18	−14	3	Ninth place game
6	Uzbekistan	5	1	0	4	5	33	−28	3	Eleventh place game

Source: FIH
Rules for classification: 1) points; 2) matches won; 3) goal difference; 4) goals for; 5) head-to-head result; 6) field goals for.
(H) Hosts

18 September 2026
15:00

Thailand	2–0	Singapore
Komolwit 50'; Inpa 57'	Report

Gifu Prefectural Green Stadium
Umpires:
Yu Tian (CHN)
Emi Yamada (JPN)

21 September 2026
15:00

Uzbekistan	1–3	Thailand
Khujaeva 17'	Report	Konthong 10'; Inpa 26'; Jirapitisatja 40'

Gifu Prefectural Green Stadium
Umpires:
Zarina Ilyassova (KAZ)
Kelly Hudson (NZL)

23 September 2026
15:00

Thailand	1–20	India
Samanso 57'	Report	Deepika 2', 8', 9', 24', 33', 36', 39', 51', 57'; Navneet 4', 29', 35', 51'; Pisal 10', 11', 47'; Neha 19'; Lalremsiami 26'; Rana 29'; Tete 45'

Gifu Prefectural Green Stadium
Umpires:
Zarina Ilyassova (KAZ)
Cookie Tan (SGP)

25 September 2026
15:00

Indonesia	1–0	Thailand
Maulani 38'	Report

Gifu Prefectural Green Stadium
Umpires:
Aleisha Neumann (AUS)
Liu Yu-Chen (TPE)

27 September 2026
17:00

Thailand	0–3	Japan
	Report	Nakagomi 10', 23'; Saito 54'

Gifu Prefectural Green Stadium
Umpires:
Liu Yu-Chen (TPE)
Cookie Tan (SGP)

Fifth place Crossover

30 September 2026
14:00

Thailand	2–1	Chinese Taipei
Smeelen 13'; Inpa 47'	Report	Huang 38'

Gifu Prefectural Green Stadium
Umpires:
Kelly Hudson (NZL)
Rama Potnis (IND)

Fifth place match

2 October 2026
14:00

Malaysia	4–0	Thailand
Mohd 14', 18'; Azhar 22'; Mazlan 53'	Report

Gifu Prefectural Green Stadium
Umpires:
Kelly Hudson (NZL)
Aleisha Neumann (AUS)

== Football ==
Team	Event	Group Stage				Quarterfinals	Semifinals	Final / BM	
Team	Event	Opposition Score	Opposition Score	Opposition Score	Rank	Opposition Score	Opposition Score	Opposition Score	Rank
Thailand men's under-23	Men's tournament	Kyrgyzstan; W 3–2	Hong Kong; W 5–1	Japan; L 0–3	2 Q	China; L 0–3	Did not advance		
Thailand Women's	Women's tournament	Japan; L 0–8	Chinese Taipei; L 0–1	Vietnam; D 0–0	4	Did not advance			

=== Men's tournament ===
Team squads

Thailand announced their final squad on 2 September.

Head coach: Thawatchai Damrong-Ongtrakul

No.	Pos.	Player	Date of birth (age)	Caps	Goals	Club
1	GK	Sorawat Phosaman	30 January 2003 (age 23)			(Football Association of Thailand) Pattani
2	DF	Chanon Tamma	19 March 2004 (age 22)			(Football Association of Thailand) BG Pathum United
3	DF	Oussama Thiangkham	4 November 2003 (age 23)			(Football Association of Thailand) PT Prachuap
4	DF	Chanapach Buaphan (captain)	22 March 2004 (age 22)			(Football Association of Thailand) BG Pathum United
5	DF	Theekawin Chansri	17 February 2004 (age 22)			(Football Association of Thailand) Muangthong United
6	MF	Sittha Boonlha	2 September 2004 (age 22)			(Football Association of Thailand) Port
7	FW	Thanawut Phochai	2 December 2005 (age 20)			(Japan Football Association) Sagamihara
8	MF	Chawanwit Saelao	12 October 2004 (age 22)			(Football Association of Thailand) Prime Bangkok
9	FW	Yotsakorn Burapha	8 June 2005 (age 21)			(Football Association of Thailand) Chonburi
10	MF	Thanakrit Chotmuangpak	6 January 2006 (age 20)			(Football Association of Thailand) Buriram United
11	MF	Siraphop Wandee	22 January 2004 (age 22)			(Football Association of Thailand) Nara
12	DF	Auttapon Sangtong	29 April 2004 (age 22)			(Football Association of Thailand) Nakhon Pathom United
13	DF	Nathan James	28 September 2004 (age 22)			(Football Association of Thailand) Mahasarakham
14	FW	Jehhanafee Mamah	24 October 2005 (age 21)			(Football Association of Thailand) PT Prachuap
15	MF	Kittapak Seangsawat	8 April 2005 (age 21)			(Football Association of Thailand) Muangthong United
16	DF	Pichitchai Sienkrathok	18 May 2003 (age 23)			(Football Association of Thailand) Ayutthaya United
17	FW	Worawut Noisri	16 February 2005 (age 21)			(Football Association of Thailand) Chiangmai United
18	MF	Patipanchai Phothep	21 July 2003 (age 23)			(Football Association of Thailand) Rayong
19	MF	Paripan Wongsa	19 March 2005 (age 21)			(Football Association of Thailand) Rasisalai United
20	GK	Sirassawut Wongruankhum	27 October 2005 (age 21)			(Football Association of Thailand) Chiangrai United
21	DF	Phon-Ek Jensen	30 March 2003 (age 23)			(Football Association of Thailand) PT Prachuap
22	DF	Wichan Inaram	20 July 2007 (age 19)			(Football Association of Thailand) Bangkok United
23	GK	Chommaphat Boonloet	17 February 2003 (age 23)			(Football Association of Thailand) Uthai Thani

Preliminary rounds – Group A

Pos	Team	Pld	W	D	L	GF	GA	GD	Pts	Qualification
1	Japan (H)	3	3	0	0	12	0	+12	9	Advance to knockout stage
2	Thailand	3	2	0	1	8	6	+2	6	Advance to knockout stage
3	Kyrgyzstan	3	1	0	2	6	10	−4	3	
4	Hong Kong	3	0	0	3	1	11	−10	0	

Source: Aichi–Nagoya 26
(H) Hosts

16 September 2026
16:00

Thailand	3–2	Kyrgyzstan
Jehhanafee 55'; Paripan 69', 73'	Report	Iskandarbekov 22'; Balbakov 47'

Toyota Stadium, Toyota
Attendance: 2,563
Referee: Abdulhadi Al-Ruaile (Qatar)

20 September 2026
16:00

Hong Kong	1–5	Thailand
Wu Chun Ming 14'	Report	Thanakrit 39'; Paripan 52'; Tsang Yi Hang 56' (o.g.); Jehhanafee 76'; Worawut 84'

Toyota Stadium, Toyota
Attendance: 10,439
Referee: Hanna Hattab (Syria)

23 September 2026
19:30

Japan	3–0	Thailand
Y. Nakajima 31'; Kosugi 47'; Ishii 48'	Report

Toyota Stadium, Toyota
Attendance: 18,408
Referee: Kim Woo-sung (South Korea)

=== Women's tournament ===
Team squads

The following players list is the Thailand squad for the 2026 Asian Games.

Head Coach: Natipong Sritong-In

No.	Pos.	Player	Date of birth (age)	Club
1	GK	Chonticha Panyarung	30 December 2008 (age 17)	(Football Association of Thailand) Khon Kaen Sports School
18	GK	Thichanan Sodchuen	1 February 2003 (age 23)	(Football Association of Thailand) BGC–College of Asian Scholars
22	GK	Chotmanee Thongmongkol	12 January 1999 (age 27)	(Chinese Taipei Football Association) Taichung Blue Whale
2	DF	U-raiporn Yongkul	17 August 1998 (age 28)	(Football Association of Thailand) BGC–College of Asian Scholars
3	DF	Phonphirun Philawan	8 April 1999 (age 27)	(Football Association of Thailand) BGC–College of Asian Scholars
4	DF	Panittha Jeeratanapavibul	15 November 2001 (age 24)	(Chinese Football Association) Guangxi Pingguo
5	DF	Natcha Kaewanta	3 December 2006 (age 19)	(Football Association of Thailand) Chonburi
6	DF	Supapron Intaraprasit	18 February 2004 (age 22)	(Football Association of Thailand) Chonburi
11	DF	Chatchawan Rodthong	22 June 2002 (age 24)	(Football Association of Thailand) Bangkok
16	DF	Krittiya Munrang	5 March 2003 (age 23)	(Football Association of Thailand) BGC–College of Asian Scholars
19	DF	Pitsamai Sornsai	19 January 1989 (age 37)	(Chinese Taipei Football Association) Taichung Blue Whale
7	MF	Khwanjira Ngok-Wong	22 December 2003 (age 22)	(Football Association of Thailand) BGC–College of Asian Scholars
8	MF	Pluemjai Sontisawat	20 July 2003 (age 23)	(Football Association of Thailand) Chonburi
12	MF	Sangrawee Meekham	27 February 1997 (age 29)	(Football Association of Thailand) BGC–College of Asian Scholars
13	MF	Achiraya Yingsakul	13 December 2007 (age 18)	(Football Association of Thailand) Bangkok
21	MF	Rinyaphat Moondong	19 June 2007 (age 19)	(Football Association of Thailand) Chonburi
9	FW	Jiraporn Mongkoldee	13 August 1998 (age 28)	(Chinese Football Association) Guangxi Pingguo
10	FW	Kanyanat Chetthabutr	24 September 1999 (age 27)	(Football Association of Thailand) BGC–College of Asian Scholars
14	FW	Saowalak Pengngam	30 November 1996 (age 29)	(Chinese Taipei Football Association) Taichung Blue Whale
15	FW	Karnjanathat Phomsri	17 January 2003 (age 23)	(Football Association of Thailand) Kasem Bundit University
17	FW	Taneekarn Dangda	15 December 1992 (age 33)	(Football Association of Thailand) Bangkok
20	FW	Wirunya Kwenkasikum	7 July 2005 (age 21)	(Football Association of Thailand) Chonburi
23	FW	Janista Jinantuya	9 September 2003 (age 23)	(Football Association of Thailand) Bangkok

Preliminary rounds – Group E

Pos	Team	Pld	W	D	L	GF	GA	GD	Pts	Qualification
1	Japan (H)	3	3	0	0	20	0	+20	9	Advance to knockout stage
2	Chinese Taipei	3	2	0	1	3	5	−2	6	Advance to knockout stage
3	Vietnam	3	0	1	2	1	10	−9	1	Advance to knockout stage
4	Thailand	3	0	1	2	0	9	−9	1	

Source: Aichi–Nagoya 26
(H) Hosts

14 September 2026
19:30

Japan	8–0	Thailand
Nakashima 3', 37', 41'; Kamiya 30'; Takarada 70', 74', 79'; Sakakibara 88'	Report

Shizuoka Stadium, Fukuroi
Attendance: 1,202
Referee: Nurul Ain Izatty Zainal (Malaysia)

17 September 2026
16:00

Thailand	0–1	Chinese Taipei
	Report	Tanaka 78'

Shizuoka Stadium, Fukuroi
Attendance: 277
Referee: Rawdha Al-Mansoori (United Arab Emirates)

21 September 2026
19:30

Vietnam	0–0	Thailand
	Report

Nagai Stadium, Osaka
Attendance: 483
Referee: Veronika Bernatskaia (Kyrgyzstan)

== Golf ==
Golfer	Event	Round 1	Round 2	Round 3	Round 4	Total		
Golfer	Event	Score	Score	Score	Score	Score	To Par	Rank
Sadom Kaewkanjana	Men's Individual	70	69	63	63	265	–15	3rd place, bronze medalist(s)
Pongsapak Laopakdee	Men's Individual	72	67	73	67	279	–1	=19
Poom Saksansin	Men's Individual	74	69	67	71	281	+1	=24
Sadom Kaewkanjana; Pongsapak Laopakdee; Poom Saksansin	Men's Team	142	136	130	130	538	–22	=4
Patcharajutar Kongkraphan	Women's Individual	69	70	74	70	283	+3	=15
Natthakritta Vongtaveelap	Women's Individual	74	70	74	74	292	+12	=23
Arpichaya Yubol	Women's Individual	67	74	66	67	274	–6	=5
Patcharajutar Kongkraphan; Natthakritta Vongtaveelap; Arpichaya Yubol	Women's Team	136	140	140	137	553	–7	=4

== Gymnastics ==
Artistic

Athlete	Event	Qualification							Final							
Athlete	Event	Apparatus						Rank	Apparatus						Total	Rank
Athlete	Event	F	PH	R	V	PB	HB	Rank	F	PH	R	V	PB	HB	Total	Rank
Suphacheep Baobenmad	Men's Floor	12.100	—N/a	—N/a	—N/a	—N/a	—N/a	26	Did not advance							
Suphacheep Baobenmad	Men's Pommel Horse	—N/a	11.966	—N/a	—N/a	—N/a	—N/a	30	Did not advance							
Suphacheep Baobenmad	Men's Rings	—N/a	—N/a	12.366	—N/a	—N/a	—N/a	24	Did not advance							
Suphacheep Baobenmad	Men's Vault	—N/a	—N/a	—N/a	12.100	—N/a	—N/a	–	Did not advance							
Suphacheep Baobenmad	Men's Parallel Bars	—N/a	—N/a	—N/a	—N/a	11.666	—N/a	29	Did not advance							
Suphacheep Baobenmad	Men's Horizontal Bar	—N/a	—N/a	—N/a	—N/a	—N/a	12.133	20	Did not advance							
Suphacheep Baobenmad	Men's All-Around	—N/a							12.100	11.966	12.366	12.100	11.666	12.133	72.331	15

Rhythmic

Athlete	Event	Qualification						Final					
Athlete	Event	Apparatus				Total	Rank	Apparatus				Total	Rank
Athlete	Event	Hoop	Ball	Clubs	Ribbon	Total	Rank	Hoop	Ball	Clubs	Ribbon	Total	Rank
Sitanan Eakbunnasing	Women's All-Around	22.150	20.200	21.600	21.950	85.900	17	Did not advance					
Sikharee Sutthiragsa	Women's All-Around	22.250	18.600	20.800	20.800	82.450	18	Did not advance					

Athletes	Event	Qualification				Final			
Athletes	Event	5 apps	3+2 apps	Total	Rank	5 apps.	3+2 apps	Total	Rank
Rakkan Chaichonich; Pornnutcha Jedthumrong; Pichayatida Ketsakul; I-aun Khoonrugsa; Puntita Thongsong	Women's Group All-Around	23.250	21.400	44.650	6	18.300	21.800	40.100	7

== Ju-jitsu ==
Athlete	Event	Round of 32	Round of 16	Quarter-finals	Semi-finals	Repechage	Final / BM	
Athlete	Event	Opposition Result	Opposition Result	Opposition Result	Opposition Result	Opposition Result	Opposition Result	Rank
Suwijak Kuntong	Men's 62 kg	Baiyshev (KGZ); L 2–2 ADV	Did not advance					
Naphat Mathupan	Men's 62 kg	Zhamankulov (KGZ); L 2–4 PTS	Did not advance					
Kunnapong Hasdee	Men's 69 kg	Bye	Rustamov (UZB); W 2–2 ADV	Huraymil (KSA); L 0–50 SUB	Did not advance			
Sarin Soonthorn	Men's 69 kg	Bye	Tianguber (KGZ); L 2–6 PTS	Did not advance				
Chanwit Aunjai	Men's 77 kg	Bye	Alhammadi (UAE); W 2–0 PTS	Park (KOR); L 0–50 SUB	Did not advance	Bolatbek (KAZ); L 0–50 SUB	Did not advance	
Kampanart Polput	Men's 77 kg	Koo (KOR); L 0–2 PTS	Did not advance					
Sukitpeerarat Jantanakha	Men's 85 kg	Utsugi (JPN); L 0–50 SUB	Did not advance					
Thanaphat Polput	Men's 85 kg	Nabas (JOR); L 0–50 SUB	Did not advance					
Rakpol Polput	Men's 94 kg	Bye	Dabyl (KAZ); L 0–50 SUB	Did not advance				
Miyu Suzuki	Women's 48 kg	Bye	Kim (KOR); W 2–0 PTS	Kulumbetova (KAZ); L 0–50 SUB	Did not advance	Hong (SGP); W 0–0 ADV	Phùng (VIE); W 6–4 PTS	3rd place, bronze medalist(s)
Pechrada Tan	Women's 48 kg	Bye	Jung (KOR); L 0–7 PTS	Did not advance				
Nuchanat Singchalad	Women's 52 kg	Bye	Ramirez (PHI); W 0–0 ADV	Altangerel (MGL); L 2–5 PTS	Did not advance	Qosimboeva (TJK); W 6–0 PTS	Ganbaatar (MGL); W 4–2 PTS	3rd place, bronze medalist(s)
Nutchaya Sugun	Women's 52 kg	Bye	Anabel (SGP); L 4–4 ADV	Did not advance				
Orapa Senatham	Women's 63 kg	Bye	Aljneibi (UAE); W 50–0 SUB	Lao (PHI); W 50–0 SUB	Ishakat (JOR); W 50–0 SUB	—N/a	Enriquez (PHI); W 0–0 ADV	1st place, gold medalist(s)
Aksarapak Sirimak	Women's 63 kg	Bye	Baasanjargal (MGL); L 0–0 ADV	Did not advance				

== Judo ==
Athlete	Event	Round of 16	Quarter-finals	Semi-finals	Repechage	Final / BM	
Athlete	Event	Opposition Result	Opposition Result	Opposition Result	Opposition Result	Opposition Result	Rank
Masayuki Terada	Men's 73 kg	Quitain (PHI); L 000–100	Did not advance				
Photchara Kanchu	Men's 81 kg	Lee (HKG); L 000–101	Did not advance				
Wei Puyang	Men's 90 kg	Han (CHN); L 000–102	Did not advance				
Kittipong Hantratin	Men's 100 kg	Sarsenbaev (UZB); L 000–110	Did not advance				
Kamolwan Akkajan	Women's 57 kg	Terbish (MGL); L 000–101	Did not advance				
Supattra Nanong	Women's 70 kg	Askhat (KAZ); L 000–010	Did not advance				
Thonthan Satjadet	Women's +78 kg	Permatasari (INA); W 010–001	Lee (KOR); L 000–100	Did not advance	Nigmatova (UZB); L 000–100	Did not advance	
Kamolwan Akkajan; Kittipong Hantratin; Photchara Kanchu; Supattra Nanong; Wei Puyang; Thonthan Satjadet; Masayuki Terada	Mixed Team	Kyrgyzstan; L 2–4	Did not advance				

== Kabaddi ==
Athlete	Event	Group stage					Semi-finals	Final	
Athlete	Event	Opposition Score	Opposition Score	Opposition Score	Opposition Score	Rank	Opposition Score	Opposition Score	Rank
Thailand Men's	Men's Tournament	Nepal; W 59–48	Malaysia; W 65–23	Pakistan; W 48–45	Iran; L 27–83	2 Q	India; L 28–66	Did not advance	3rd place, bronze medalist(s)
Thailand Women's	Women's Tournament	Sri Lanka; W 40–28	Nepal; L 43–46	Chinese Taipei; L 31–43	—N/a	3	Did not advance		

== Karate ==
Athlete	Event	Round of 16	Quarter-finals	Semi-finals	Repechage	Final / BM	
Athlete	Event	Opposition Result	Opposition Result	Opposition Result	Opposition Result	Opposition Result	Rank
Natthakrit Ingloy	Men's –55 kg	—N/a	Manandhar (NEP); L 0–9 PTS	Did not advance			
Siwakon Muekthong	Men's –60 kg	Albasher (KSA); L 5–5 PTS	Did not advance				
Teerawat Kangtong	Men's +84 kg	—N/a	Sufyani (KSA); L 0–5 PTS	Did not advance	—N/a	Hutapea (INA); W 6–3 PTS	3rd place, bronze medalist(s)
Monsicha Sakulrattanatara	Women's Individual kata	Sadeghi (IRI); L 0–5 PTS	Did not advance				
Phatcharin Plangplai; Monsicha Sakulrattanatara; Ramitar Terananon	Women's Team kata	—N/a	Iran; L 0–5	Did not advance	—N/a	Philippines; L 1–4	4
Sirikamonnate Chokprasertgul	Women's –50 kg	Alimardanova (UZB); L 5–5 PTS	Did not advance				
Maneewan Butsuwan	Women's +68 kg	—N/a	Orozalieva (KGZ); W 8–8 PTS	Lubis (INA); W 4–3 PTS	—N/a	Berultseva (KAZ); L 0–8 PTS	2nd place, silver medalist(s)

== Kurash ==
Athlete	Event	Round of 32	Round of 16	Quarter-finals	Semi-finals	Final	
Athlete	Event	Opposition Result	Opposition Result	Opposition Result	Opposition Result	Opposition Result	Rank
Rattanan Kaunsatan	Men's 81 kg	—N/a	Ahmadzadeh (IRI); L 0–10	Did not advance			
Kunathip Yea-on	Men's +90 kg	—N/a	Baek (KOR); W 5–0	Vishal (IND); W 5–0	Mirmamadov (TJK); L 0–10	Did not advance	3rd place, bronze medalist(s)
Chanyanuch Mathitano	Women's 57 kg	Lee (TPE); L 0–10	Did not advance				
Waraporn Suwanpairat	Men's +87 kg	—N/a	Yang (TPE); L 0–10	Did not advance			

== Mixed Martial Arts ==
Athlete	Event	Preliminary	Quarter-finals	Semi-finals	Final	
Athlete	Event	Opposition Result	Opposition Result	Opposition Result	Opposition Result	Rank
Saksit Janhom	Men's Modern 71 kg	Khurshedzoda (TJK); L 0–3	Did not advance			
Kanjutha Phattaraboonsorn	Women's Modern 54 kg	Bye	Araos (PHI); W 3–0	Hotmauli (INA); W 3–0	Pogosian (BRN); W 3–0	1st place, gold medalist(s)

== Modern pentathlon ==
Athlete	Event	Fencing seeding		Semi-finals										Final									
Athlete	Event	Fencing seeding		Fencing		Obstacle		Swimming		Laser-run		Total points	Final rank	Fencing		Obstacle		Swimming		Laser-run		Total points	Final rank
Athlete	Event	Won	Rank	Points	Rank	Points	Rank	Points	Rank	Points	Rank	Total points	Final rank	Points	Rank	Points	Rank	Points	Rank	Points	Rank	Total points	Final rank
Pongkrit Thatthong	Men's individual	11	29	198	17	352	9	308	11	538	13	1396	27	Did not advance									
Phurit Yohuang	Men's individual	19	19	218	9	362	12	317	4	610	5	1507	14 Q	204	16	314	17	318	8	601	17	1437	16
Parita Paisansrisin	Women's individual	14	20	214	11	314	9	249	12	491	11	1268	22	Did not advance									
Aphisaraporn Trongtorkit	Women's individual	8	31	204	16	EL		248	11	439	12	891	29	Did not advance									
Chananan Witsaphan	Women's individual	13	23	212	12	318	8	178	16	419	13	1127	26	Did not advance									
Parita Paisansrisin; Aphisaraporn Trongtorkit; Chananan Witsaphan	Women's team	See above — The individual competition's results of each team determined the results of the team classification.										3286	7	Did not advance									

== Padel ==
Athlete	Event	Round of 32	Round of 16	Quarter-finals	Semi-finals	Final	Rank
Athlete	Event	Opposition Score	Opposition Score	Opposition Score	Opposition Score	Opposition Score	Rank
Stefano Mocciola; Arnav Rawal	Men's Pairs	Bye	Hatakeyama / Tomita (JPN); L 0–2	Did not advance			
Natalie Narkprasert; Dares Srirungreang	Women's Pairs	Hasan / Sarkhoo (KUW); W 2–0	Fareh / Yamani (KSA); L 1–2	Did not advance			

== Rowing ==
Athlete	Event	Heat		Final A / Final B	
Athlete	Event	Time	Rank	Time	Rank
Narongsak Naksaeng; Premanut Wattananusith	Men's Double Sculls	6:29.42	3 FB	6:27.42	1
Siripong Chaiwichitchonkul; Nawamin Dechudomrat; Watchara Pangthong; Yutthana Tamarom	Men's Quadruple Sculls	6:34.73	5 FB	6:04.05	3
Phasin Chueatai	Men's Lightweight Single Sculls	7:28.07	3 FA	7:03.19	5
Natticha Kaewhom; Matinee Raruen	Women's Pair	8:10.40	3 FB	7:32.82	1
Parisa Chaempudsa	Women's Lightweight Single Sculls	7:41.96	1 FA	7:40.61	3rd place, bronze medalist(s)

Qualification Legend: FA=Final A (medal); FB=Final B (non-medal)

== Rugby sevens ==
Team	Event	Group Stage				Quarterfinals	Semifinals	Final / BM		Placement Round			
Team	Event	Opposition Score	Opposition Score	Opposition Score	Rank	Opposition Score	Opposition Score	Opposition Score	Rank	Opposition Score	Opposition Score	Opposition Score	Rank
Thailand Men's	Men's Tournament	South Korea; L 7–24	Kazakhstan; L 5–12	Japan; L 0–38	4	Did not advance				Singapore; W 17–12	Uzbekistan; W 17–14	Kazakhstan; W 14–5	9
Thailand Women's	Women's Tournament	Kazakhstan; W 28–5	Singapore; W 36–0	Japan; L 5–34	2 Q	—N/a	China; L 0–28	Hong Kong; L 5–7	4	—N/a			

== Sailing ==
Athlete	Event	Race												Net Points	Total Points	Final Rank
Athlete	Event	1	2	3	4	5	6	7	8	9	10	11	12	Net Points	Total Points	Final Rank
William McMillan	Men's iQFoil	(7); DNF	(5)	5	4	2	3	3	1	3	3	1	—N/a	25	37	3rd place, bronze medalist(s)
Hussaluk Srinakorn	Boys' ILCA 4	1	5	4	5	(12); UFD	5	4	(7)	5	4	2	4	39	58	5
Sarawut Panphiboon; Panudat Polpool	Boys' 29er	3	4	6	6	5	2	5	6	5	5	(7); DNF	(7); DNF	47	61	6
Wachirawit Thonup	Boys' iQFoil	4	3	6	(7); DSQ	3	4	5	6	6	6	(7); BFD	—N/a	43	57	6
Siripon Kaewduang-Ngam	Women's iQFoil	5	3	(6)	2	4	6	5	6	6	6	—N/a		43	49	6
Pinchanok Klaysomboon	Girls' ILCA 4	7	5	5	2	1	1	1	1	1	1	(8)	(10); RET	25	43	1st place, gold medalist(s)
Pichayapa Kamutatira; Patcharaphan Ongkaloy	Girls' 29er	4	3	4	4	4	3	3	4	4	3	(5); DNF	(5); DNS	36	46	4
Chanatkan Charoensuk	Girls' iQFoil	4	4	2	3	1	3	3	4	(6)	3	(5)	—N/a	27	38	3rd place, bronze medalist(s)
Navee Thamsoontorn; Nichapa Waiwai	Mixed 470	2	2	(7)	1	3	5	4	4	4	6	—N/a		31	38	4
Pitipoom Jaroenpon; Worrakan Saksriklom	Mixed 420	2	1	(6)	2	4	2	2	4	4	(5)	2	2	25	36	2nd place, silver medalist(s)

Athlete	Event	Qualification Race									Net Points	Total Points	Rank	Final Race			Net Points	Total Points	Final Rank
Athlete	Event	1	2	3	4	5	6	7	8	9	Net Points	Total Points	Rank	Recalulated Point	1	2	Net Points	Total Points	Final Rank
Chusitt Punjamala	Men's ILCA 7	4	1	9	2	4	1	8	8	(12)	37	49	5	13	4	9	26	26	6
Sophia Montgomery	Women's ILCA 6	2	2	2	(6)	5	1	3	4	2	21	27	1	0	2	3	5	5	1st place, gold medalist(s)

Keys:

- BFD: Disqualification under rule 30.4 (starting under black flag)
- DNF: Did not finish
- DNS: Did not start
- DSQ: Disqualification
- RET: Retired
- UFD: Disqualification under rule 30.3 (starting under "U" flag)

== Sepak takraw ==
Athlete	Event	Group Stage				Semifinals	Final	
Athlete	Event	Opposition Score	Opposition Score	Opposition Score	Rank	Opposition Score	Opposition Score	Rank
Wuttinun Kamsanor; Kritsanapong Nontakote; Tanaphon Sapyen; Phutawan Sopa; Pornthep Tinbangbon	Men's Regu	Philippines; W 2–0	Japan; W 2–1	—N/a	1 Q	Vietnam; W 2–0	Malaysia; W 2–0	1st place, gold medalist(s)
Wuttinun Kamsanor; Sittipong Khamchan; Kritsanapong Nontakote; Jirasak Pakbuangoen; Pichet Pansan; Marukin Phanmakon; Poottipong Pukdee; Tanaphon Sapyen; Phutawan Sopa; Kritsada Sungvung; Wichan Temkort; Pornthep Tinbangbon	Men's Team Regu	South Korea; W 3–0	Indonesia; W 3–0	Laos; W 3–0	1 Q	Japan; W 2–0	Malaysia; L 0–2	2nd place, silver medalist(s)
Manlika Bunthod; Wiphada Chitphuan; Masaya Duangsri; Somruedee Pruepruk; Ratchaneekorn Saeheang; Ratsamee Thongsod	Women's Quadrant	Vietnam; L 0–2	Philippines; W 2–0	India; W 2–0	2 Q	Indonesia; W 2–0	Vietnam; L 1–2	2nd place, silver medalist(s)
Manlika Bunthod; Wiphada Chitphuan; Masaya Duangsri; Wilaiwan Khodphom; Athikan Kongkaew; Pruksa Maneewong; Somruedee Pruepruk; Kaewjai Pumsawangkaew; Ratchaneekorn Saeheang; Nipaporn Salupphon; Usa Srikhamlue; Ratsamee Thongsod	Women's Team Regu	Japan; W 3–0	Indonesia; W 3–0	South Korea; W 3–0	1 Q	Japan; W 2–0	South Korea; W 2–0	1st place, gold medalist(s)

== Shooting ==
Men

Athlete	Event	Qualification		Final	
Athlete	Event	Points	Rank	Points	Rank
Chanon Binmad	10 m air rifle	625.3	21	Did not advance	
Patsugree Sriwichai	10 m air rifle	622.8	30	Did not advance	
Napis Tortungpanich	10 m air rifle	619.1	34	Did not advance	
Chanon Binmad; Patsugree Sriwichai; Napis Tortungpanich	10 m air rifle team	—N/a		1867.2	11
Patsugree Sriwichai	50 m rifle 3 position	567-12x	36	Did not advance	
Napis Tortungpanich	50 m rifle 3 position	582-29x	15	Did not advance	
Thongphaphum Vongsukdee	50 m rifle 3 position	575-25x	25	Did not advance	
Patsugree Sriwichai; Napis Tortungpanich; Thongphaphum Vongsukdee	50 m rifle 3 position team	—N/a		1724-66x	8
Pongpol Kulchairattana	10 m air pistol	566-13x	38	Did not advance	
Kiettikul Sudkhet	10 m air pistol	571-12x	27	Did not advance	
Daranpop Kanjanapong	25 m rapid fire pistol	574-11x	11	Did not advance	
Schwakon Triniphakorn	25 m rapid fire pistol	567-10x	21	Did not advance	
Jintapat Hongchintakul	Trap	106	35	Did not advance	
Yodchai Phachonyut	Trap	97	38	Did not advance	
Savate Sresthaporn	Trap	111	27	Did not advance	
Jintapat Hongchintakul; Yodchai Phachonyut; Savate Sresthaporn	Trap team	—N/a		314	9
Tanapat Jangpanich	Skeet	109	34	Did not advance	
Pitipoom Phasee	Skeet	104	39	Did not advance	
Ekarut Rungsarutkanchana	Skeet	112	25	Did not advance	
Tanapat Jangpanich; Pitipoom Phasee; Ekarut Rungsarutkanchana	Skeet team	—N/a		325	9

Women

Athlete	Event	Qualification		Final	
Athlete	Event	Points	Rank	Points	Rank
Thanyalak Chotphibunsin	10 m air rifle	616.3	48	Did not advance	
Ratchadaporn Plengsaengthong	10 m air rifle	619.3	45	Did not advance	
Chanittha Sastwej	10 m air rifle	623.4	32	Did not advance	
Thanyalak Chotphibunsin; Ratchadaporn Plengsaengthong; Chanittha Sastwej	10 m air rifle team	—N/a		1859.0	13
Thanyalak Chotphibunsin	50 m rifle 3 position	576-25x	32	Did not advance	
Jayden Jitrawee Mohprasit	50 m rifle 3 position	575-24x	34	Did not advance	
Ratchadaporn Plengsaengthong	50 m rifle 3 position	587-24x	11	Did not advance	
Thanyalak Chotphibunsin; Jayden Jitrawee Mohprasit; Ratchadaporn Plengsaengthong	50 m rifle 3 position team	—N/a		1738-73x	11
Surassawadee Bubphachat	10 m air pistol	557-8x	42	Did not advance	
Natsara Champalat	10 m air pistol	551-9x	46	Did not advance	
Kamonlak Saencha	10 m air pistol	567-16x	28	Did not advance	
Surassawadee Bubphachat; Natsara Champalat; Kamonlak Saencha	10 m air pistol team	—N/a		1675-33x	11
Natsara Champalat	25 m pistol	568-15x	31	Did not advance	
Nechaya Klaisuban	25 m pistol	566-15x	36	Did not advance	
Kamonlak Saencha	25 m pistol	558-14x	42	Did not advance	
Natsara Champalat; Nechaya Klaisuban; Kamonlak Saencha	25 m pistol team	—N/a		1692-44x	11
Chattaya Kitcharoen	Trap	108	14	Did not advance	
Isarapa Imprasertsuk	Skeet	114	5 Q	31	2nd place, silver medalist(s)

Mixed team

Athlete	Event	Qualification		Final	
Athlete	Event	Points	Rank	Points	Rank
Patsugree Sriwichai; Chanittha Sastwej	10 m air rifle	621.2	11	Did not advance	
Kiettikul Sudkhet; Surassawadee Bubphachat	10 m air pistol	564-10x	14	Did not advance	
Savate Sresthaporn; Chattaya Kitcharoen	Trap	130	10	Did not advance	
Tanapat Jangpanich; Isarapa Imprasertsuk	Skeet	130	8	Did not advance	

== Skateboarding ==
Athlete	Event	Preliminary		Final	
Athlete	Event	Result	Rank	Result	Rank
Konwit Ketkaeo	Men's Park	52.71	9	Did not advance	
Brian Upapong	Men's Park	47.00	11	Did not advance	
Kirin Petkiree	Men's Street	103.21	8 Q	107.39	7
Thawatchai Siangoueng	Men's Street	109.01	7 Q	112.75	6
Freya Brown	Women's Park	41.76	11	Did not advance	
Nathtiyabhorn Nawakitwong	Women's Street	82.35	10	Did not advance	
Vareeraya Sukasem	Women's Street	110.07	7 Q	102.85	7

== Softball ==
Team	Event	Group Stage								Final / BM	
Team	Event	Opposition Score	Opposition Score	Opposition Score	Opposition Score	Opposition Score	Opposition Score	Opposition Score	Rank	Opposition Score	Rank
Thailand Women's	Women's Tournament	South Korea; L 0–7	China; L 0–15	Japan; L 0–15	Philippines; L 0–7	Chinese Taipei; L 1–22	Hong Kong; L 5–6	Singapore; L 1–10	8	Did not advance	

== Soft tennis ==
Athlete	Event	Group Stage				Quarter-finals	Semi-finals	Final	Rank
Athlete	Event	Opposition Score	Opposition Score	Opposition Score	Rank	Opposition Score	Opposition Score	Opposition Score	Rank
Chatcha Klomkamol	Women's Singles	Hacnolath (LAO); W 4–1	Hwang (KOR); L 0–4	—N/a	2	Did not advance			
Alisha Ziegler	Women's Singles	Tiwari (IND); W 4–1	Shallwani (PAK); W 4–0	—N/a	1 Q	Ri (PRK); L 2–4	Did not advance		
Praewa JongJit; Chatcha Klomkamol; Buntita Phoungprapa; Thanpitcha Somsanit; Alisha Ziegler	Women's Team	Chinese Taipei; L 0–3	Philippines; L 1–2	Mongolia; W 3–0	3	—N/a	Did not advance		

== Sport climbing ==
Boulder

Athlete	Event	Semi-finals		Final	
Athlete	Event	Score	Rank	Score	Rank
Auswin Aueareechit	Men's Boulder	83.9	4 Q	20.0	7
Teeraphon Boondech	Men's Boulder	19.2	15	Did not advance	
Annabel McGinnis	Women's Boulder	10.0	14	Did not advance	
Natcha Supavorased	Women's Boulder	69.2	10	Did not advance	

Lead

Athlete	Event	Semi-finals		Final	
Athlete	Event	Score	Rank	Score	Rank
Auswin Aueareechit	Men's Lead	23	7 Q	21+	9
Teeraphon Boondech	Men's Lead	17+	15	Did not advance	
Natcha Supavorased	Women's Lead	27+	9	Did not advance	

Speed

Athlete	Event	Qualification		Quarter-finals		Semi-finals		Final	
Athlete	Event	Best	Rank	Time	Rank	Time	Rank	Time	Rank
Aphiwit Limpanichpakdee	Men's Speed	4.974	8 Q	5.14	2 Q	5.04	4	Did not advance	
Napat Disyabut	Women's Speed	7.43	10 Q	7.95	4	Did not advance			
Narada Disyabut	Women's Speed	8.18	15 Q	7.46	3	Did not advance			

== Squash ==
Athlete	Event	Round of 64	Round of 32	Round of 16	Quarter-finals	Semi-finals	Final	Rank
Athlete	Event	Opposition Score	Opposition Score	Opposition Score	Opposition Score	Opposition Score	Opposition Score	Rank
Arkaradet Arkarahirunya	Men's Singles	Bye	Singh (IND); L 0–3	Did not advance				
Thitivuth Yingcharoen	Men's Singles	Begornia (PHI); L 1–3	Did not advance					
Anantana Prasertratanakul	Women's Singles	—N/a	Bat-Erdene (MGL); W 3–0	Midorikawa (JPN); L 0–3	Did not advance			

Athlete	Event	Group stage			Quarter-finals	Semi-finals	Final	Rank
Athlete	Event	Opposition Score	Opposition Score	Rank	Opposition Score	Opposition Score	Opposition Score	Rank
Arkaradet Arkarahirunya; Ravipun Limphaiboon; Thitivuth Yingcharoen	Men's Team	Malaysia; L 0–3	Qatar; L 0–3	3	Did not advance			

== Surfing ==
Four athletes have qualified for the 2026 Asian Games through the ASF Asian Surfing Championships 2024 & 2025.

Athlete	Event	Heat		Round 2	Round 3	Quarter-finals	Semi-finals	Final	
Athlete	Event	Score	Rank	Opposition Result	Opposition Result	Opposition Result	Opposition Result	Opposition Result	Rank
Tinn Johnson	Men's Shortboard	6.63	3	Mannan (BAN); W 9.40–8.50	Ariyana (INA); L 8.50–11.50	Did not advance			
Natthakron Sae-iew	Men's Shortboard	7.54	2	Areef (MDV); W 11.20–5.67	Palmiano (KOR); L 8.74–9.80	Did not advance			
Annissa Flynn	Women's Shortboard	8.80	1	Bye	Chung (TPE); W 9.83–7.43	Ikeda (JPN); L 5.43–10.67	Did not advance		
Isabel Higgs	Women's Shortboard	9.17	1	Bye	Lee (KOR); W 12.10–7.97	Yang (CHN); L 10.84–15.80	Did not advance		

== Swimming ==
Men

Athlete	Event	Heat		Final	
Athlete	Event	Time	Rank	Time	Rank
Pongpanod Trithan	50 m Freestyle	22.83	18	Did not advance	
Surasit Thongdeang	100 m Freestyle	51.23	25	Did not advance	
Pongpanod Trithan	100 m Freestyle	49.03	8 Q	49.10	8
Wongsakorn Patsamarn	200 m Freestyle	1:53.71	25	Did not advance	
Pongpanod Trithan	200 m Freestyle	1:49.46	9 Q	1:49.46	9
Ratthawit Thammananthachote	400 m Freestyle	3:59.24	20	Did not advance	
Ratthawit Thammananthachote	800 m Freestyle	—N/a		8:15.63	16
Ratthawit Thammananthachote	1500 m Freestyle	—N/a		15:54.53	16
Tonnam Kanteemool	50 m Backstroke	25.98	15	Did not advance	
Tonnam Kanteemool	100 m Backstroke	56.26	13	Did not advance	
Tonnam Kanteemool	200 m Backstroke	2:04.20	15	Did not advance	
Pasawat Kantakom	50 m Breaststroke	28.88	27	Did not advance	
Marrich Somridhivej	50 m Breaststroke	27.73	9 Q	27.84	8
Pasawat Kantakom	100 m Breaststroke	1:03.74	24	Did not advance	
Marrich Somridhivej	100 m Breaststroke	1:01.94	17	Did not advance	
Pasawat Kantakom	200 m Breaststroke	DNS		Did not advance	
Wongsakorn Patsamarn	50 m Butterfly	25.75	28	Did not advance	
Wongsakorn Patsamarn	100 m Butterfly	55.17	19	Did not advance	
Surasit Thongdeang	100 m Butterfly	54.24	15	Did not advance	
Wongsakorn Patsamarn	200 m Butterfly	2:02.32	12	Did not advance	
Surasit Thongdeang	200 m Butterfly	2:01.05	8 Q	2:01.24	9
Pasawat Kantakom	200 m Individual Medley	2:06.72	21	Did not advance	
Skye Sharples	200 m Individual Medley	2:05.10	18	Did not advance	
Skye Sharples	400 m Individual Medley	4:29.97	15	Did not advance	
Tonnam Kanteemool; Skye Sharples; Surasit Thongdeang; Pongpanod Trithan	4 × 100 m Freestyle Relay	3:20.07	5 Q	3:18.73	6
Tonnam Kanteemool; Wongsakorn Patsamarn; Surasit Thongdeang; Pongpanod Trithan	4 × 200 m Freestyle Relay	7:23.97	7 Q	7:21.08	7
Tonnam Kanteemool; Marrich Somridhivej; Surasit Thongdeang; Pongpanod Trithan	4 × 100 m Medley Relay	3:40.51	8 Q	3:38.84	5

Mixed

Athlete	Event	Heat		Final	
Athlete	Event	Time	Rank	Time	Rank
Surasit Thongdeang; Pongpanod Trithan; Phurichaya Junyamitree; Mia Millar	4 × 100 m Medley Relay	4:02.40	9	Did not advance	

Women

Athlete	Event	Heat		Final	
Athlete	Event	Time	Rank	Time	Rank
Ploy Leelayana	50 m Freestyle	26.56	17	Did not advance	
Ploy Leelayana	100 m Freestyle	58.40	17	Did not advance	
Varissara Nopthong	100 m Freestyle	58.49	20	Did not advance	
Maria Nedelko	200 m Freestyle	2:04.21	10 Q	2:03.24	9
Jinjutha Pholjamjumrus	200 m Freestyle	2:02.64	8 Q	2:03.13	8
Kamonchanok Kwanmuang	400 m Freestyle	4:20.31	8 Q	4:21.95	9
Maria Nedelko	400 m Freestyle	4:25.29	12	Did not advance	
Kamonchanok Kwanmuang	800 m Freestyle	—N/a		DNS	
Thitirat Charoensup	1500 m Freestyle	—N/a		17:17.22	6
Mia Millar	50 m Backstroke	30.00	19	Did not advance	
Mia Millar	100 m Backstroke	1:03.51	13	Did not advance	
Mia Millar	200 m Backstroke	2:16.69	10 Q	2:16.37	10
Thitirat Inchai	50 m Breaststroke	33.22	16	Did not advance	
Phurichaya Junyamitree	50 m Breaststroke	32.70	13	Did not advance	
Thitirat Inchai	100 m Breaststroke	1:14.11	16	Did not advance	
Phurichaya Junyamitree	100 m Breaststroke	1:09.77	8	1:09.82	9
Pimchanok Chinveeraphan	200 m Breaststroke	2:29.12	5 Q	2:28.00	5
Napatsawan Jaritkla	50 m Butterfly	DNS		Did not advance	
Napatsawan Jaritkla	100 m Butterfly	1:00.76	11 R	1:01.25	10
Varissara Nopthong	100 m Butterfly	1:02.08	15	Did not advance	
Kamonchanok Kwanmuang	200 m Butterfly	2:16.09	11	Did not advance	
Jinjutha Pholjamjumrus	200 m Butterfly	2:12.02	6 Q	2:12.32	7
Kamonchanok Kwanmuang	200 m Individual Medley	2:18.09	9 Q	2:19.03	10
Varissara Nopthong	200 m Individual Medley	2:23.65	15	Did not advance	
Kamonchanok Kwanmuang	400 m Individual Medley	DNS		Did not advance	
Jinjutha Pholjamjumrus	400 m Individual Medley	4:50.69	6 Q	4:49.00	6
Ploy Leelayana; Mia Millar; Maria Nedelko; Varissara Nopthong	4 × 100 m Freestyle Relay	3:50.96	6 Q	3:49.81	5
Kamonchanok Kwanmuang; Mia Millar; Maria Nedelko; Jinjutha Pholjamjumrus	4 × 200 m Freestyle Relay	8:35.44	6 Q	8:16.55	6
Phurichaya Junyamitree; Kamonchanok Kwanmuang; Mia Millar; Maria Nedelko	4 × 100 m Medley Relay	4:12.72	7 Q	4:11.43	7

== Table tennis ==
Athlete	Event	Round of 64	Round of 32	Round of 16	Quarterfinal	Semifinal	Final / BM	
Athlete	Event	Opposition Result	Opposition Result	Opposition Result	Opposition Result	Opposition Result	Opposition Result	Rank
Thitaphat Preechayan	Men's Singles	Khan (PAK); W 4–0	Wang C. (CHN); L 2–4	Did not advance				
Sarayut Tancharoen	Men's Singles	Ismail (MDV); W 4–1	Gerassimenko (KAZ); L 3–4	Did not advance				
Thitaphat Preechayan; Phakpoom Sanguansin	Men's Doubles	Bye	Lim / Oh (KOR); L 0–3	Did not advance				
Orawan Paranang	Women's Singles	Bye	Nazim (MDV); W 4–0	Sun (CHN); L 0–4	Did not advance			
Suthasini Sawettabut	Women's Singles	Azar (LBN); W 4–0	Harimoto (JPN); L 0–4	Did not advance				
Orawan Paranang; Suthasini Sawettabut	Women's Doubles	Bye	Azar / Chiri (LBN); W 3–0	Cheng / Yeh (TPE); W 3–0	Joo / Shin (KOR); W 3–2	Kuai / Wang M. (CHN); L 0–4	Did not advance	3rd place, bronze medalist(s)
Kulapassr Vijitviriyagul; Phatsaraphon Wonglakhon	Women's Doubles	Bye	Harimoto / Hayata (JPN); L 0–3	Did not advance				
Thitaphat Preechayan; Kulapassr Vijitviriyagul	Mixed Doubles	Bye	Ridoy / Mahi (BAN); W 3–0	Wong / Doo (HKG); L 0–3	Did not advance			
Phakpoom Sanguansin; Orawan Paranang	Mixed Doubles	Ghaffari / Ashtari (IRI); W 3–1	Junindra / Nebuchadnezzar (INA); W 3–0	Lin / Kuai (CHN); L 1–3	Did not advance			

Team

Athlete	Event	Group stage				Round of 16	Quarterfinal	Semifinal	Final	
Athlete	Event	Opposition Score	Opposition Score	Opposition Score	Rank	Opposition Score	Opposition Score	Opposition Score	Opposition Score	Rank
Thitaphat Preechayan; Phakpoom Sanguansin; Sarayut Tancharoen	Men's Team	Hong Kong; L 1–3	Kyrgyzstan; W 3–0	—N/a	2 Q	Uzbekistan; W 3–0	China; L 1–3	Did not advance		
Orawan Paranang; Jinnipa Sawettabut; Suthasini Sawettabut; Kulapassr Vijitviriyagul; Phatsaraphon Wonglakhon	Women's Team	Qatar; W 3–0	Hong Kong; L 2–3	Lebanon; W 3–0	2 Q	India; L 2–3	Did not advance			

== Taekwondo ==
Kyorugi

Athlete	Event	Round of 16	Quarter-finals	Semi-finals	Final	
Athlete	Event	Opposition Score	Opposition Score	Opposition Score	Opposition Score	Rank
Sirawit Mahamad	Men's 58 kg	An (KOR); L 0–2	Did not advance			
Banlung Tubtimdang	Men's 68 kg	Hsu (TPE); W 2–0	Kosimkhojiev (UZB); W 2–1	Mun (KOR); W 2–1	Mousaei (IRI); W 2–0	1st place, gold medalist(s)
Krittayot Phrompatju	Men's 80 kg	Toleugali (KAZ); L 0–2	Did not advance			
Jack Mercer	Men's +80 kg	Saeed (PAK); W 2–0	Kang (KOR); L 0–2	Did not advance		
Patcharakan Poolkerd	Women's 49 kg	Ishak (MAS); W 2–0	Bat-Erdene (MGL); W 2–0	Ma (CHN); L 0–2	Did not advance	3rd place, bronze medalist(s)
Natkamon Wassana	Women's 57 kg	Mirabzalova (UZB); W 2–1	Aoun (LBN); W 2–1	Khirfan (JOR); L 0–2	Did not advance	3rd place, bronze medalist(s)
Sasikarn Tongchan	Women's 67 kg	Ganzorig (MGL); W 2–0	Sobirjonova (UZB); L 1–2	Did not advance		
Kannaluck Chuenchooklin	Women's +67 kg	Yadav (IND); W 2–0	Mu (CHN); L 0–2	Did not advance		
Sasikarn Tongchan	Virtual Mixed Individual	Lkhagva (MGL); W 2–0	Châu (VIE); L 0–2	Did not advance		

Poomsae

Athlete	Event	Semi-finals		Final	
Athlete	Event	Opposition Score	Rank	Opposition Score	Rank
Navin Pinthasute	Men's Individual	8.9700	1 Q	9.2800	2nd place, silver medalist(s)
Thitaree Kaewolanwasu	Women's Individual	8.7200	2 Q	9.0400	3rd place, bronze medalist(s)

== Tennis ==
Athlete	Event	Round of 64	Round of 32	Round of 16	Quarterfinals	Semifinals	Final	
Athlete	Event	Opposition Score	Opposition Score	Opposition Score	Opposition Score	Opposition Score	Opposition Score	Rank
Maximus Jones	Men's Singles	Bye	Urnukh (MGL); W 2–0 (6–0, 6–0)	Shevchenko (KAZ); L 0–2 (1–6, 4–6)	Did not advance			
Kasidit Samrej	Men's Singles	Bye	Khadka (NEP); W 2–0 (6–2, 6–2)	Skatov (KAZ); W 2–0 (6–2, 7–6^{8–6})	Wong (HKG); L 0–2 (3–6, 0–6)	Did not advance		
Pruchya Isaro; Maximus Jones	Men's Doubles	—N/a	Kong / Meng (CHN); W 2–0 (7–5, 7–6^{7–3})	Kurniawan / Trismuwantara (INA); W 2–0 (6–2, 6–4)	Nam / Park (KOR); L 0–2 (2–6, 3–6)	Did not advance		
Pawit Sornlaksup; Wishaya Trongcharoenchaikul	Men's Doubles	—N/a	Kurbonov / Sharifov (TJK); W 2–0 (6–1, 6–1)	Jiang / Zhang (CHN); L 1–2 (6–7^{1–7}, 6–3, 5–10)	Did not advance			
Patcharin Cheapchandej	Women's Singles	—N/a	Qureshi (PAK); W 2–0 (6–1, 6–1)	Eala (PHI); L 0–2 (1–6, 0–6)	Did not advance			
Mananchaya Sawangkaew	Women's Singles	—N/a	Chogsomjav (MGL); W 2–0 (6–4, 6–2)	Shek (HKG); W 2–0 (7–5, 6–3)	Putintseva (KAZ); L 0–2 (3–6, 0–6)	Did not advance		
Anchisa Chanta; Peangtarn Plipuech	Women's Doubles	—N/a	Rajabalieva / Tursunova (TJK); W 2–0 (6–0, 6–0)	Danilina / Putintseva (KAZ); L 1–2 (7–5, 3–6, 6–10)	Did not advance			
Patcharin Cheapchandej; Thasaporn Naklo	Women's Doubles	—N/a	Back / Jang (KOR); L 1–2 (4–6, 6–3, 5–10)	Did not advance				
Thanapet Chanta; Anchisa Chanta	Mixed Doubles	—N/a	Shin W. / Ku (KOR); L 0–2 (3–6, 2–6)	Did not advance				
Pruchya Isaro; Peangtarn Plipuech	Mixed Doubles	—N/a	Shin S. / Lee (KOR); L 1–2 (6–1, 1–6, 10–12)	Did not advance				

== Teqball ==
Athlete	Event	Group Stage					Quarter-finals	Semi-finals	Final / BM	Rank
Athlete	Event	Opposition Score	Opposition Score	Opposition Score	Opposition Score	Rank	Opposition Score	Opposition Score	Opposition Score	Rank
Jirati Chanliang; Sorrasak Thaosiri	Men's doubles	Montenegro / Pacis (PHI); W (12–7, 12–4)	Ardin / Uba (INA); W (12–3, 12–10)	—N/a		1 Q	Arai / Nodomi (JPN); W (12–2, 12–8)	Alelayawi / Radhi (IRQ); W (12–3, 12–11)	Arabi / Hafez (LBN); W (12–7, 12–4)	1st place, gold medalist(s)
Jutatip Kuntatong; Suphawadi Wongkhamchan	Women's doubles	Hsu Mon / Phyu Phyu (MYA); W (12–2, 12–8)	Chedid / Dandal (LBN); W (12–7, 12–4)	Mey / Yorn (CAM); W (12–2, 12–2)	—N/a	1 Q	—N/a	Mey / Yorn (CAM); W (12–5, 12–4)	Hsu Mon / Phyu Phyu (MYA); W (12–6, 12–3)	1st place, gold medalist(s)
Phakpong Dejaroen; Suphawadi Wongkhamchan	Mixed doubles	Bun / Yorn (CAM); W (12–5, 12–5)	Alebraheem / Alfailakawi (KUW); W (12–6, 12–3)	Anas / Dsouza (IND); W (12–3, 12–8)	Agustin / Abulencia (PHI); W (12–5, 12–5)	1 Q	Inthalapheth / Phonexay (LAO); W (12–2, 12–5)	Nguyễn / Trịnh (VIE); W (12–8, 12–5)	Wase / Sakamoto (JPN); W (12–4, 12–5)	1st place, gold medalist(s)

== Triathlon ==
Individual

Athlete	Event	Time						Rank
Athlete	Event	Swim (0.75 km)	Trans 1	Bike (20 km)	Trans 2	Run (5 km)	Total	Rank
Kritsanaphon Phonphai	Men	9:45	0:39	29:25	0:25	18:45	58:59	23
Pattarapoom Onsuwan	Men	10:20	0:42	31:18	0:21	20:43	1:03:24	28
Pichayanat Kittivorakij	Women	10:12	0:50	36:33	0:26	23:15	1:11:16	23
Suchaya Leenakul	Women	10:16	0:47	34:08	0:27	23:30	1:09:08	21

Relay

Athlete	Event	Time						Rank
Athlete	Event	Swim (300 m)	Trans 1	Bike (6.6 km)	Trans 2	Run (1 km)	Total	Rank
Pichayanat Kittivorakij	Mixed	4:22	0:55	12:19	0:27	8:28	26:31	—N/a
Phuwadet Rakmanusa	Mixed	4:26	0:56	10:41	0:23	7:39	24:05	—N/a
Kankamol Sangkaew	Mixed	6:00	0:51	11:34	0:25	8:43	27:33	—N/a
Kritsanaphon Phonphai	Mixed	4:21	0:48	11:02	0:24	6:49	23:24	—N/a
Total	Mixed	—N/a					1:41:33	12

== Volleyball ==
Team	Event	Group Stage				Quarterfinal	Semifinal	Classification		Final / BM	
Team	Event	Opposition Score	Opposition Score	Opposition Score	Rank	Opposition Score	Opposition Score	Opposition Score	Opposition Score	Opposition Score	Rank
Thailand men's	Men's tournament	Indonesia; W 3–2	Iran; L 0–3	Kyrgyzstan; W 3–0	2 Q	China; L 0–3	Did not advance	Qatar; W 3–1	India; W 3–2	Did not advance	5
Thailand women's	Women's tournament	Mongolia; W 3–0	Kyrgyzstan; W 3–0	Chinese Taipei; W 3–0	1 Q	Indonesia; W 3–0	China; L 2–3	—N/a		South Korea; W 3–0	3rd place, bronze medalist(s)

Men's tournament

Team roster

- Anuchit Pakdeekaew
- Chaiwat Thungkham
- Kiadtiphum Ramsin
- Napadet Bhinijdee
- Nakharin Inthanu
- Anurak Phanram
- Boonyarid Wongtorn
- Narongrit Janpirom
- Toopadit Phraput
- Thanat Bamrungphakdi
- Suwit Mahasiriyothin
- Jakkrit Thanomnoi

Group play

Pos	Team	Pld	W	L	Pts	SW	SL	SR	SPW	SPL	SPR	Qualification
1	Iran	3	3	0	8	9	2	4.500	260	203	1.281	Quarterfinals
2	Thailand	3	2	1	5	6	5	1.200	244	246	0.992	Quarterfinals
3	Indonesia	3	1	2	5	7	6	1.167	301	289	1.042	Classification 9th–16th
4	Kyrgyzstan	3	0	3	0	0	9	0.000	160	227	0.705	Classification 9th–16th

Source: asiangames2026.org
Rules for classification: Tiebreakers

Women's tournament

Team roster

- Piyanut Pannoy
- Pornpun Guedpard
- Kanyarat Kunmuang
- Thatdao Nuekjang
- Warisara Seetaloed
- Kalyarat Khamwong
- Sasipaporn Janthawisut
- Natthanicha Jaisaen
- Pimpichaya Kokram
- Ajcharaporn Kongyot
- Chatchu-on Moksri
- Kaewkalaya Kamulthala

Group play

Pos	Team	Pld	W	L	Pts	SW	SL	SR	SPW	SPL	SPR	Qualification
1	Thailand	3	3	0	9	9	0	MAX	225	139	1.619	Quarterfinals
2	Chinese Taipei	3	2	1	6	6	3	2.000	214	157	1.363	Quarterfinals
3	Mongolia	3	1	2	3	3	6	0.500	167	198	0.843	Classification 9th–12th
4	Kyrgyzstan	3	0	3	0	0	9	0.000	113	225	0.502	Classification 9th–14th

Source: asiangames2026.org
Rules for classification: Tiebreakers

== Water polo ==
Men

Team	Event	Group Stage				Quarterfinals	Semifinals	Classification		Final / BM	
Team	Event	Opposition Score	Opposition Score	Opposition Score	Rank	Opposition Score	Opposition Score	Opposition Score	Opposition Score	Opposition Score	Rank
Thailand Men's	Men's Tournament	Hong Kong; L 15–24	Japan; L 4–30	Kazakhstan; L 6–21	4 Q	China; L 4–26	Did not advance	South Korea; L 11–22	Singapore; L 14–24	Did not advance	8

Women

Team	Event	Round Robin					
Team	Event	Opposition Score	Opposition Score	Opposition Score	Opposition Score	Opposition Score	Rank
Thailand Women's	Women's Tournament	Japan; L 7–27	China; L 6–21	Kazakhstan; L 13–14 (3–4p)	Uzbekistan; W 16–10	Singapore; W 12–9	3rd place, bronze medalist(s)

== Weightlifting ==
Athlete	Event	Snatch					Clean & Jerk					Total	Rank
Athlete	Event	1	2	3	Result	Rank	1	2	3	Result	Rank	Total	Rank
Theerapong Silachai	Men's −60 kg	~~126~~	~~126~~	126	126	6	165	173	~~176~~	173	2	299	3rd place, bronze medalist(s)
Patsaphong Thongsuk	Men's −65 kg	~~130~~	~~130~~	~~130~~	—	—	—	—	—	—	—	DNF	
Teerawat Ratphet	Men's −70 kg	~~137~~	137	~~140~~	137	6	~~170~~	~~170~~	170	170	6	307	6
Weeraphon Wichuma	Men's −75 kg	155	158	160	160	2	~~200~~	200	205	205	2	365	2nd place, silver medalist(s)
Worrapot Nasuriwong	Men's −85 kg	145	~~150~~	~~150~~	145	8	185	~~190~~	~~190~~	185	8	330	8
Suthasini Kaeosingkhon	Women's −49 kg	~~75~~	75	79	79	5	93	96	99	99	5	178	5
Surodchana Khambao	Women's −53 kg	90	93	95	95	3	115	119	~~127~~	119	3	214	3rd place, bronze medalist(s)
Suratwadee Yodsarn	Women's −57 kg	92	95	97	97	2	122	—	—	122	2	219	2nd place, silver medalist(s)
Thanaporn Saetia	Women's −61 kg	~~97~~	97	99	99	5	120	124	126	126	4	225	4
Supatchanin Khamhaeng	Women's +86 kg	100	~~105~~	105	105	6	128	133	136	136	6	241	6

== Wrestling ==
Athlete	Event	Qualification	Round of 16	Quarter-finals	Semi-finals	Repechage	Final / BM	
Athlete	Event	Opposition Result	Opposition Result	Opposition Result	Opposition Result	Opposition Result	Opposition Result	Rank
Thirawat Maithong	Men's Freestyle 65 kg	Ou (CHN); L 0–10	Did not advance					
Chiranuwat Chamnanjan	Men's Freestyle 86 kg	—N/a	Lee (KOR); L 0–11	Did not advance				
Nuttapong Hinmee	Men's Greco-Roman 67 kg	—N/a	Mohammadi (QAT); L 0–9	Did not advance				
Anucha Yospanya	Men's Greco-Roman 130 kg	—N/a	Bye	Agadadaýew (TKM); L 0–9	Did not advance			

== Wushu ==
Taolu

Athlete	Event	Event 1		Event 2		Total	Rank
Athlete	Event	Result	Rank	Result	Rank	Total	Rank
Weerachat Koolsawatmongkol	Men's Changquan	9.220	17	—N/a		9.220	17
Pitaya Yangrungrawin	Men's Nanquan & Nangun	9.443	14	8.990	17	18.433	16
Wanchai Yodyinghathaikun	Men's Nanquan & Nangun	8.766	18	9.526	15	18.292	17
Katisak Goolsawadmongkol	Men's Taijiquan & Taijijian	9.273	14	9.630	13	18.903	14
Sirinapha Horchue	Women's Taijiquan & Taijijian	8.363	12	8.293	12	16.656	12

Sanda

Athlete	Event	Round of 16	Quarter-finals	Semi-finals	Final	
Athlete	Event	Opposition Score	Opposition Score	Opposition Score	Opposition Score	Rank
Chainarong Yawanophat	Men's –65 kg	Zhenishbek (KGZ); L WPD	Did not advance			
