= Sailing at the 2026 Asian Games – Girls' ILCA 4 =

Girls' ILCA 4 at the 2026 Asian Games
- Venue: Kaiyoh Yacht Harbor
- Date: 30 September – 3 October 2026
- Competitors: 9 from 9 nations

Medalists
gold medal	Pinchanok Klaysomboon	Thailand
silver medal	Huang Zixi	Hong Kong
bronze medal	Lee Song-ha	South Korea

The girls' ILCA 4 competition at the 2026 Asian Games was held from 30 September – 3 October 2026 at Kaiyoh Yacht Harbor in Gamagōri, Aichi, Japan.

Pinchanok Klaysomboon won the gold medal, Huang Zixi took silver and Lee Song-ha bronze.

== Schedule ==
All times are Japan Standard Time (UTC+09:00).

Date	Time	Event
Wednesday, 30 September 2026	11:00	Race 1–3
Thursday, 1 October 2026	13:10	Race 4–6
Friday, 2 October 2026	12:40	Race 7–10
Saturday, 3 October 2026	10:40	Race 11–12

== Results ==
Legend

- DNC — Did not come to the starting area
- DSQ — Disqualification
- RET — Retired

Rank	Athlete	Race												Total	Net
Rank	Athlete	1	2	3	4	5	6	7	8	9	10	11	12	Total	Net
1st place, gold medalist(s)	Pinchanok Klaysomboon (THA)	7	5	5	2	1	1	1	1	1	1	~~(8)~~	~~(10)~~; RET	43	25
2nd place, silver medalist(s)	Huang Zixi (HKG)	1	~~(7)~~	~~(7)~~	5	3	2	3	4	2	2	3	4	43	29
3rd place, bronze medalist(s)	Lee Song-ha (KOR)	4	2	4	3	2	3	4	2	~~(5)~~	3	4	~~(7)~~	43	31
4	Nur Hafizanah Zailan (MAS)	3	~~(8)~~	~~(6)~~	4	4	5	5	3	3	4	2	1	48	34
5	Tew Jiaxuan Mika (SGP)	6	3	~~(8)~~	1	6	4	2	5	4	~~(8)~~	1	5	53	37
6	Marwa Al-Hammadi (UAE)	2	1	2	7	7	7	7	~~(8)~~	~~(8)~~	7	7	2	65	49
7	Kurumi Iijima (JPN)	5	6	3	6	5	6	~~(8)~~	~~(7)~~	6	6	5	3	66	51
8	Mahi Verma (IND)	~~(10)~~; RET	4	1	~~(8)~~	8	8	6	6	7	5	6	6	75	57
9	Taissiya Ilina (KAZ)	8	9	9	9	9	9	9	9	9	~~(10)~~; DNC	9	~~(10)~~; DSQ	109	89
