= Judo at the 2022 Asian Games – Women's 70 kg =

Judo competition

Judo Women's 70 kg at the 2022 Asian Games
- Venue: Xiaoshan Linpu Gymnasium
- Location: Hangzhou, China
- Dates: 25 September 2023
- Nations: 15

Medalists
gold medal	Shiho Tanaka	Japan
silver medal	Mun Song-hui	North Korea
bronze medal	Gulnoza Matniyazova	Uzbekistan
bronze medal	Feng Yingying	China

Competition at external databases
- Links: IJF • JudoInside

The women's 70 kilograms (half lightweight) competition in Judo at the 2022 Asian Games in Hangzhou was held on 25 September 2023 at the Xiaoshan Linpu Gymnasium.

== Schedule ==
All times are China Standard Time (UTC+08:00)

Date	Time	Event
Monday, 25 September 2023	10:00	Elimination round of 16
Monday, 25 September 2023	10:00	Quarterfinals
Monday, 25 September 2023	10:00	Repechage
Monday, 25 September 2023	10:00	Semifinals
Monday, 25 September 2023	16:00	Finals

== Results ==
=== Main bracket ===
Round of 16
Garima Choudhary (IND)	00 (yellow card)
Ryouko Salinas (PHI)	10
Feng Yingying (CHN)	10 (yellow card)
Azhar Isaeva (KGZ)	00 (yellow card)
Liao Yu-Jung (TPE)	10 (yellow card)
Supattra Nanong (THA)	00 (yellow card)
Gulnoza Matniyazova (UZB)	10
Kuok Lai Iong (MAC)	00
Anastassiya Mayakova (KAZ)	01
Maryam Barbat (IRI)	10
Han Hee-ju (KOR)	00
Mun Song-hui (PRK)	10
Batsuuriin Nyam-Erdene (MGL)	11
Punam Shrestha (NEP)	00

Quarter-finals
Shiho Tanaka (JPN)	10
Ryouko Salinas (PHI)	00
Feng Yingying (CHN)	10
Liao Yu-Jung (TPE)	00 (yellow card)
Gulnoza Matniyazova (UZB)	10
Maryam Barbat (IRI)	00
Mun Song-hui (PRK)	10
Batsuuriin Nyam-Erdene (MGL)	00

Semi-finals
Shiho Tanaka (JPN)	01 (yellow card)
Feng Yingying (CHN)	00 (yellow card)
Gulnoza Matniyazova (UZB)	00
Mun Song-hui (PRK)	10

Gold medal contest
Shiho Tanaka (JPN)	10
Mun Song-hui (PRK)	00

=== Repechage ===
Repechage
Ryouko Salinas (PHI)	00 (yellow card)
Liao Yu-Jung (TPE)	10
Maryam Barbat (IRI)	01
Batsuuriin Nyam-Erdene (MGL)	10

Bronze medal contests
Liao Yu-Jung (TPE)	00
Gulnoza Matniyazova (UZB)	10 (yellow card)
Batsuuriin Nyam-Erdene (MGL)	00
Feng Yingying (CHN)	10
