= Rin Maeda =

Japanese judoka (born 2005)

Personal information
- Born: 8 September 2005 (age 21)
- Occupation: Judoka

Sport
- Country: Japan
- Sport: Judo
- Weight class: ‍–‍70 kg
Medal record
Women's judo
Representing Japan
World Championships
| Gold medal – first place | 2026 Baku | Mixed team |
Asian Games
| Gold medal – first place | 2026 Aichi‑Nagoya | ‍–‍70 kg |
IJF Grand Slam
| Gold medal – first place | 2025 Tashkent | ‍–‍70 kg |
| Bronze medal – third place | 2024 Tokyo | ‍–‍70 kg |
| Bronze medal – third place | 2026 Paris | ‍–‍70 kg |
World University Games
| Gold medal – first place | 2025 Rhine‑Ruhr | ‍–‍70 kg |

Profile at external databases
- IJF: 86210
- JudoInside.com: 166544
- Updated on 11 October 2026

Rin Maeda (前田凛, Maeda Rin; born 8 September 2005) is a Japanese judoka.

== Career ==
In March 2025, Maeda competed at the 2025 Tashkent Grand Slam and won her first career Grand Slam gold medal in the ‍–‍70 kg category. In July 2025, she represented Japan at the 2025 Summer World University Games and won a gold medal in the ‍–‍70 kg category.

In October 2026, she competed at the 2026 Asian Games and won a gold medal in the ‍–‍70 kg category. During the quarterfinals against Tang Jing of China, Maeda was bit and the referees declared a disqualification for Tang due to a foul just 1 minute and 12 seconds into the match. A week later she competed at the 2026 World Championships and helped Japan win a gold medal in the mixed team event. This was Japan's eighth gold medal in the event at the World Championships and first since 2024.
