= Ju-jitsu at the 2026 Asian Games – Women's 52 kg =

Women's jiu-jitsu 52 kg at the 2026 Asian Games
- Venue: Aichi Budokan
- Dates: 2 October 2026
- Competitors: 17 from 11 nations

Medalists
gold medal	Asma Al-Hosani	United Arab Emirates
silver medal	Im Eon-ju	South Korea
bronze medal	Kaila Napolis	Philippines
bronze medal	Nuchanat Singchalad	Thailand

The women's jiu-jitsu (ne-waza) 52 kilograms Ju-jitsu competition at the 2026 Asian Games in Nagoya was held on 2 October 2026 at Aichi Budokan.

== Schedule ==
All times are Japan Standard Time (UTC+09:00)

Date	Time	Event
Friday, 2 October 2026	11:48	Elimination round of 32
Friday, 2 October 2026	11:56	Elimination round of 16
Friday, 2 October 2026	13:00	Quarterfinals
Friday, 2 October 2026	13:32	Semifinals
Friday, 2 October 2026	13:48	Repechage
Friday, 2 October 2026	15:18	Contests for bronze medals
Friday, 2 October 2026	15:34	Final

== Results ==
Legend

- SU — Won by submission (50–0)
- ADV — Won by advantages
- PNT — Won by penalties
- DSQ — Won by disqualification

=== Main bracket ===
==== Final ====
Final
Asma Al-Hosani (UAE)	4
Im Eon-ju (KOR)	0

==== Top half ====
Elimination round of 32
Trần Hồng An (VIE)	0^{DSQ}
Galina Duvanova (KAZ)	0

Elimination round of 16
Asma Al-Hosani (UAE)	0^{ADV}
Trần Hồng An (VIE)	0
Park Jeong-hye (KOR)	0
Fariza Qosimboeva (TJK)	50^{SU}
Tsagaanbileg Altangerel (MGL)	0^{ADV}
Sayaka Suzuki (JPN)	0
Annie Ramirez (PHI)	0
Nuchanat Singchalad (THA)	0^{ADV}

Quarterfinals
Asma Al-Hosani (UAE)	4
Fariza Qosimboeva (TJK)	0
Tsagaanbileg Altangerel (MGL)	5
Nuchanat Singchalad (THA)	2

Semifinals
Asma Al-Hosani (UAE)	0^{ADV}
Tsagaanbileg Altangerel (MGL)	0

==== Bottom half ====
Elimination round of 32

Elimination round of 16
Im Eon-ju (KOR)	50^{SU}
Peng (LAO)	0
Nutchaya Sugun (THA)	0^{ADV}
Sofia Anabel Rivas (SGP)	0
Mongoljin Ganbaatar (MGL)	50^{SU}
Shamsa Alameri (UAE)	0
Trần Thị Thanh Hà (VIE)	0
Kaila Napolis (PHI)	2

Quarterfinals
Im Eon-ju (KOR)	50^{SU}
Sofia Anabel Rivas (SGP)	0
Mongoljin Ganbaatar (MGL)	3
Kaila Napolis (PHI)	2

Semifinals
Im Eon-ju (KOR)	5
Mongoljin Ganbaatar (MGL)	0

=== Repechage ===
Repechage round 1
Fariza Qosimboeva (TJK)	0
Nuchanat Singchalad (THA)	6
Sofia Anabel Rivas (SGP)	2
Kaila Napolis (PHI)	2^{ADV}

Contests for bronze medals
Nuchanat Singchalad (THA)	4
Mongoljin Ganbaatar (MGL)	2
Kaila Napolis (PHI)	2
Tsagaanbileg Altangerel (MGL)	0
