= Sailing at the 2026 Asian Games – Girls' iQFoil =

Girls' iQFoil at the 2026 Asian Games
- Venue: Kaiyoh Yacht Harbor
- Date: 1–3 October 2026
- Competitors: 6 from 6 nations

Medalists
| gold medal | Cheung Tsz Yuet | Hong Kong |
| silver medal | Akari Oshima | Japan |
| bronze medal | Chanatkan Charoensuk | Thailand |

The girls' iQFoil competition at the 2026 Asian Games was held from 1–3 October 2026 at Kaiyoh Yacht Harbor in Gamagōri, Aichi, Japan.

Cheung Tsz Yuet won the gold medal, Akari Oshima took silver and Chanatkan Charoensuk bronze.

== Schedule ==
All times are Japan Standard Time (UTC+09:00).

| Date | Time | Event |
|---|---|---|
| Thursday, 1 October 2026 | 10:05 | Race 1–5 |
| Friday, 2 October 2026 | 13:05 | Race 6–10 |
| Saturday, 3 October 2026 | 10:00 | Race 11 |

== Results ==
Legend

- BFD — Black flag disqualification

| Rank | Athlete | Race | | | | | | | | | | | Total | Net |
| Rank | Athlete | 1 | 2 | 3 | 4 | 5 | 6 | 7 | 8 | 9 | 10 | 11 | Total | Net |
|---|---|---|---|---|---|---|---|---|---|---|---|---|---|---|
| 1st place, gold medalist(s) | Cheung Tsz Yuet (HKG) | 1 | 1 | ~~(3)~~ | 1 | ~~(2)~~ | 1 | 1 | 1 | 1 | 1 | 1 | 14 | 9 |
| 2nd place, silver medalist(s) | Akari Oshima (JPN) | 2 | ~~(3)~~ | 1 | 2 | ~~(4)~~ | 2 | 2 | 2 | 2 | 2 | 2 | 24 | 17 |
| 3rd place, bronze medalist(s) | Chanatkan Charoensuk (THA) | 4 | 4 | 2 | 3 | 1 | 3 | 3 | 4 | ~~(6)~~ | 3 | ~~(5)~~ | 38 | 27 |
| 4 | Baek Ga-yeon (KOR) | 3 | ~~(6)~~ | 4 | 4 | 3 | 4 | 4 | 3 | 3 | 5 | ~~(7)~~; BFD | 46 | 33 |
| 5 | Angyal Chew (SGP) | 5 | 2 | ~~(6)~~ | 5 | ~~(6)~~ | 5 | 5 | 5 | 4 | 6 | 3 | 52 | 40 |
| 6 | Kelsy Loryn Moreno (PHI) | ~~(6)~~ | 5 | 5 | ~~(6)~~ | 5 | 6 | 6 | 6 | 5 | 4 | 4 | 58 | 46 |
