= Judo at the 2026 Asian Games – Women's 70 kg =

Judo competition

Judo Women's 70 kg at the 2026 Asian Games
- Venue: Aichi International Arena
- Location: Nagoya, Japan

Medalists
| gold medal | Rin Maeda | Japan |
| silver medal | Azhar Askhat | Kazakhstan |
| bronze medal | Uran-Ölziin Anujin | Mongolia |
| bronze medal | Mun Song-hui | North Korea |

The women's 70 kilograms (Middleweight) competition in Judo at the 2026 Asian Games in Nagoya was held on 1 October 2026 at the Aichi International Arena.

== Schedule ==
All times are Japan Standard Time (UTC+09:00)

| Date | Time | Event |
|---|---|---|
| Thursday, 1 October 2026 | 11:00 | Elimination round of 16 |
| Thursday, 1 October 2026 | 11:00 | Quarterfinals |
| Thursday, 1 October 2026 | 11:00 | Repechage |
| Thursday, 1 October 2026 | 11:00 | Semifinals |
| Thursday, 1 October 2026 | 17:00 | Finals |

== Results ==
=== Main bracket ===
==== Final ====
| Final |
| Rin Maeda (JPN) | 101 |
| Azhar Askhat (KAZ) | 000 |

==== Top half ====
Round of 16
Tang Jing (CHN) | 101
Alabama Namthip Slayman (LAO) | 000
Mun Song-hui (PRK) | 100 (yellow card)
Kim Hye-mi (KOR) | 000
Inunganbi Takhellambam (IND) | 100
Punam Shrestha (NEP) | 000

Quarter-finals
Rin Maeda (JPN) | 100
~~Tang Jing (CHN)~~ | 000X
Mun Song-hui (PRK) | 100 (yellow card)
Inunganbi Takhellambam (IND) | 000

Semi-finals
Rin Maeda (JPN) | 001 (yellow card)
Mun Song-hui (PRK) | 000

==== Bottom half ====
Round of 16
Azhar Askhat (KAZ) | 010
Supattra Nanong (THA) | 000 (yellow card)
Khurshida Razzokberdieva (UZB) | 002 (yellow card)
Fabiha Busra (BAN) | 000 (yellow card)
Alina Moldokulova (KGZ) | 000
Uran-Ölziin Anujin (MGL) | 100 (yellow card)

Quarter-finals
Liao Yu-jung (TPE) | 000
Azhar Askhat (KAZ) | 100
Khurshida Razzokberdieva (UZB) | 000
Uran-Ölziin Anujin (MGL) | 001 (yellow card)

Semi-finals
Azhar Askhat (KAZ) | 011
Uran-Ölziin Anujin (MGL) | 000

=== Repechage ===
Repechage
~~Tang Jing (CHN)~~ | DSQ
Inunganbi Takhellambam (IND) | w/o
Liao Yu-jung (TPE) | 000
Khurshida Razzokberdieva (UZB) | 101

Bronze medal
Inunganbi Takhellambam (IND) | 000
Uran-Ölziin Anujin (MGL) | 012
Khurshida Razzokberdieva (UZB) | 000
Mun Song-hui (PRK) | 100
