= Mun Song-hui =

North Korean judoka (born 2002)

Personal information
- Born: 9 January 2002 (age 24)
- Occupation: Judoka

Sport
- Country: North Korea
- Sport: Judo
- Weight class: ‍–‍70 kg

Achievements and titles
- Olympic Games: R32 (2024)
- World Champ.: R16 (2024)
- Asian Champ.: (gold) (2026)
Medal record
Women's judo
Representing North Korea
Asian Games
| Silver medal – second place | 2023 Hangzhou | ‍–‍70 kg |
| Bronze medal – third place | 2026 Aichi‑Nagoya | ‍–‍70 kg |
Asian Championships
| Gold medal – first place | 2026 Ordos | ‍–‍70 kg |
| Silver medal – second place | 2024 Hong Kong | ‍–‍70 kg |
| Bronze medal – third place | 2025 Bangkok | ‍–‍70 kg |
Asian Cadet Championships
| Silver medal – second place | 2019 Taipei | ‍–‍57 kg |

Profile at external databases
- IJF: 40830
- JudoInside.com: 115912
- Updated on 1 October 2026

Mun Song-hui (born 9 January 2002) is a North Korean judoka. Mun competed for North Korea at the 2022 Asian Games, which were postponed to 2023, where she earned a silver medal. Mun also competed in the 2024 Asian Championships, for which she won a silver medal in the women's 70 kg division. She also represented North Korea at the 2024 Summer Olympics in Paris.
