= Canoeing at the 2026 Asian Games – Men's slalom C-1 =

Men's C-1 at the 2026 Asian Games
- Venue: Yahagigawa Canoe Slalom Course
- Date: 29 September – 1 October 2026
- Competitors: 11 from 8 nations

Medalists
gold medal	Zhang Zhicheng	China
silver medal	Wu Jung-cheng	Chinese Taipei
bronze medal	Piyanath Koetsuk	Thailand

The men's slalom C-1 (canoe single) competition at the 2026 Asian Games was held from 29 September to 1 October 2026 at the Yahagigawa Canoe Slalom Course in Toyota, Aichi Prefecture, Japan. Zhang Zhicheng won the gold medal, Wu Jung-cheng took silver and Piyanath Koetsuk the bronze.

== Schedule ==
All times are Japan Standard Time (UTC+09:00)

Date	Time	Event
Tuesday, 29 September 2026	11:47	Heats
Thursday, 1 October 2026	10:30	Semifinal
Thursday, 1 October 2026	13:30	Final

== Results ==
=== Heats ===
Rank	Athlete	Time	Pen.	Total
1	Zhang Zhicheng (CHN)	99.10	4	103.10
2	Anvar Klevleev (UZB)	103.56	0	103.56
3	Alexandr Kulikov (KAZ)	107.25	0	107.25
4	Wu Jung-cheng (TPE)	108.96	2	110.96
5	Shota Saito (JPN)	111.57	4	115.57
6	Piyanath Koetsuk (THA)	115.92	4	119.92
7	Chonlasit Phuttraksa (THA)	121.58	4	125.58
8	Lee Jeong-sub (KOR)	152.98	8	160.98
9	Kazuya Adachi (JPN)	110.90	106	216.90
10	Chang Fu-hua (TPE)	111.91	106	217.91
11	Ade Yoan Sutanto (INA)	129.75	162	291.75

Progression system: 1 to 11 advanced to the semifinal, the rest were eliminated.

=== Semifinal ===
Rank	Athlete	Time	Pen.	Total
1	Zhang Zhicheng (CHN)	99.45	2	101.45
2	Anvar Klevleev (UZB)	103.16	0	103.16
3	Wu Jung-cheng (TPE)	103.29	2	105.29
4	Kazuya Adachi (JPN)	108.77	0	108.77
5	Alexandr Kulikov (KAZ)	106.24	4	110.24
6	Shota Saito (JPN)	108.41	4	112.41
7	Chang Fu-hua (TPE)	113.40	0	113.40
8	Piyanath Koetsuk (THA)	116.53	0	116.53
9	Chonlasit Phuttraksa (THA)	118.38	8	126.38
10	Lee Jeong-sub (KOR)	167.82	4	171.82
11	Ade Yoan Sutanto (INA)	144.55	54	198.55

Progression system: 1 to 8 advanced to the final, the rest were eliminated.

=== Final ===
Rank	Athlete	Time	Pen.	Total
1st place, gold medalist(s)	Zhang Zhicheng (CHN)	98.09	0	98.09
2nd place, silver medalist(s)	Wu Jung-cheng (TPE)	113.09	6	119.09
3rd place, bronze medalist(s)	Piyanath Koetsuk (THA)	117.68	4	121.68
4	Anvar Klevleev (UZB)	98.37	50	148.37
5	Alexandr Kulikov (KAZ)	104.52	52	156.52
6	Kazuya Adachi (JPN)	108.85	58	166.85
7	Ade Yoan Sutanto (INA)	155.70	54	209.70
8	Lee Jeong-sub (KOR)	173.18	304	477.18

== External Link ==
- Reports
