= Judo at the 2025 Summer World University Games – Women's 70 kg =

Women's 70 kg at the 2025 Summer World University Games
- Venue: Messe Essen
- Location: Essen
- Dates: 24 July
- Competitors: 28

Medalists
gold medal	Rin Maeda	Japan
silver medal	Samira Bock	Germany
bronze medal	Teophila Darbes-Takam	France
bronze medal	Taís Pina	Portugal

The women's 70 kg at the 2025 Summer World University Games in Rhine-Ruhr, Germany was held 24 July 2025. Rin Maeda of Japan captured the gold medal. Samira Bock of Germany took home the silver medal. The bronze medals were awarded to Teophila Darbes-Takam of France and Taís Pina of Portugal.

== Schedule ==
All times are Central European Time (UTC+1)

Date	Time	Event
24 July 2015	10:00	Preliminary Rounds
24 July 2015	17:00	Final Block

== Results ==
Athletes advanced through direct knockout rounds—including the round of 32, round of 16, quarterfinals, and semifinals—to determine the two finalists fighting for the gold and silver medals. Parallel to the main bracket, a repechage system allowed defeated quarterfinalists to work their way back into the tournament, culminating in two separate bronze medal matches where the repechage winners faced the losing semifinalists.

Round of 32
U Pileckaitė (LTU)	001
K Sotnikova (KAZ)	010 (yellow card)
Lee Yr (KOR)	101 (yellow card)
E Ganbayar (MGL)	000
L Schutjes (NED)	100
A Valenzuela (CHI)	000
A Salazar (ESP)	100
J Wernert (AUT)	000 (yellow card)
S Bock (GER)	100
L Zárybnická (CZE)	000
A Gardashkhanli (AZE)	100
M Tchanturia (GEO)	000
K Kulić (CRO)	100 (yellow card)
Yuan Pc (TPE)	000
M Esposito (ITA)	000
T Darbes-Takam (FRA)	011
K Hansen (DEN)	000 (yellow card)
N Nguyen (USA)	111 (yellow card)
T Khaidem (IND)	000 (yellow card)
O Tsimko (UKR)	100
S Yuldoshova (UZB)	000
J Czerlau (HUN)	100 (yellow card)
M Duishonbekova (KGZ)	100
Y Tarabay (LBN)	000

Round of 16
T Pina (POR)	100
K Sotnikova (KAZ)	000
Lee Yr (KOR)	100
L Schutjes (NED)	000
F Ögel (TUR)	101
A Salazar (ESP)	000
S Bock (GER)	100
A Gardashkhanli (AZE)	000 (yellow card)
L Carvalho (BRA)	001
K Kulić (CRO)	000
T Darbes-Takam (FRA)	011
N Nguyen (USA)	000 (yellow card)
R Maeda (JPN)	020
O Tsimko (UKR)	000
J Czerlau (HUN)	002
M Duishonbekova (KGZ)	011

Quarter-finals
T Pina (POR)	100
Lee Yr (KOR)	000 (yellow card)
F Ögel (TUR)	000 (yellow card)
S Bock (GER)	101 (yellow card)
L Carvalho (BRA)	000
T Darbes-Takam (FRA)	100
R Maeda (JPN)	110
M Duishonbekova (KGZ)	000

Semi-finals
T Pina (POR)	000
S Bock (GER)	100 (yellow card)
T Darbes-Takam (FRA)	000
R Maeda (JPN)	100

Final
S Bock (GER)	000 (yellow card)
R Maeda (JPN)	100 (yellow card)

Repechage Phases

Repechage
Lee Yr (KOR)	001
F Ögel (TUR)	002
L Carvalho (BRA)	100 (yellow card)
M Duishonbekova (KGZ)	000

Bronze medal
F Ögel (TUR)	000
T Darbes-Takam (FRA)	010 (yellow card)
L Carvalho (BRA)	000
T Pina (POR)	100
