= Sailing at the 2026 Asian Games – Men's iQFoil =

Men's iQFoil at the 2026 Asian Games
- Venue: Kaiyoh Yacht Harbor
- Date: 30 September – 2 October 2026
- Competitors: 6 from 6 nations

Medalists
gold medal	Bi Kun	China
silver medal	Lee Tae-hoon	South Korea
bronze medal	William McMillan	Thailand

The men's iQFoil competition at the 2026 Asian Games was held from 30 September – 2 October 2026 at Kaiyoh Yacht Harbor in Gamagōri, Aichi, Japan.

Bi Kun won the gold medal, Lee Tae-hoon took silver and William McMillan bronze.

== Schedule ==
All times are Japan Standard Time (UTC+09:00).

Date	Time	Event
Wednesday, 30 September 2026	11:00	Race 1
Thursday, 1 October 2026	13:00	Race 2–6
Friday, 2 October 2026	10:00	Race 7–11

== Results ==
Legend

- DNF — Did not finish

Rank	Athlete	Race											Total	Net
Rank	Athlete	1	2	3	4	5	6	7	8	9	10	11	Total	Net
1st place, gold medalist(s)	Bi Kun (CHN)	1	1	1	~~(2)~~	1	~~(5)~~	1	2	2	1	2	19	12
2nd place, silver medalist(s)	Lee Tae-hoon (KOR)	~~(4)~~	3	2	1	~~(5)~~	1	4	3	1	2	3	29	20
3rd place, bronze medalist(s)	William McMillan (THA)	~~(7)~~; DNF	~~(5)~~	5	4	2	3	3	1	3	3	1	37	25
4	Cheng Ching Yin (HKG)	2	2	~~(6)~~	~~(5)~~	3	4	2	4	4	4	4	40	29
5	Kensei Ikeda (JPN)	3	~~(6)~~	3	3	4	2	~~(5)~~	5	5	5	5	46	35
6	John Harold Madrigal (PHI)	~~(7)~~; DNF	4	4	~~(6)~~	6	6	6	6	6	6	6	63	50
