= Kamonlak Saencha =

Thai sports shooter (born 2007)

Personal information
- Native name: กมลลักษณ์ แสนชา
- Born: October 1, 2007 (age 18) Nakhon Sawan province, Thailand

Sport
- Country: Thailand
- Sport: Shooting
- Event: 10 metre air pistol
Medal record
Women's shooting
Representing Thailand
ISSF Olympic Qualification Championship
Silver medal – second place	2024 ISSF Olympic Qualification Championship	10 m air pistol
- Updated on September 13, 2026

Kamonlak Saencha (Thai: กมลลักษณ์ แสนชา; born 1 October 2007) is a Thai sports shooter. She represented for Thailand in many events such as 2024 ISSF Olympic Qualification Championship and the 2024 Summer Olympics.

In 2024, Kamonlak won a silver medal in the women's 10-meter air pistol event at the ISSF Olympic Qualification Championship in Rio de Janeiro. She scored 240.5 and finished behind Elmira Karapetyan. She got qualified to compete at the 2024 Summer Olympics. She finished 36th in the 10-meter air pistol and 33rd in the 25-meter pistol.
