= Fencing at the 2026 Asian Games – Women's team épée =

Women's team épée at the 2026 Asian Games
- Venue: Aichi Sky Expo Hall F
- Date: 25 September 2026
- Competitors: 49 from 13 nations

Medalists
gold medal	China; Liu Chang, Tang Junyao, Yang Jingwen, Yu Sihan
silver medal	South Korea; Lee Hye-in, Lim Tae-hee, Song Se-ra, Yang Seung-hye
bronze medal	Kazakhstan; Vladislava Andreyeva, Irina Bakaldina, Sofiya Nikolaichuk, Daria Samodelkina
bronze medal	Singapore; Filzah Hidayah Binte Nor Anuar, Kiria Tikanah, Elle Koh, Esther Tan

The women's team épée competition at the 2026 Asian Games in Nagoya was held on 25 September 2026 at the Aichi Sky Expo Hall F. China defeated South Korea 45–28 in the final to win the gold medal, the first fencing title for the host of the 2022 edition at these Games. Kazakhstan and Singapore shared the bronze medals.

== Schedule ==
All times are Japan Standard Time (UTC+09:00)

Date	Time	Event
Friday, 25 September 2026	10:30	Table of 16
Friday, 25 September 2026	11:50	Quarterfinals
Friday, 25 September 2026	16:20	Semifinals
Friday, 25 September 2026	19:20	Gold medal match

== Seeding ==
The teams were seeded taking into account the results achieved by competitors representing each team in the individual event.

Rank	Team	Fencer		Total
Rank	Team	1	2	Total
1	Singapore (SGP)	2	6	8
2	China (CHN)	3	8	11
3	Kazakhstan (KAZ)	5	7	12
4	South Korea (KOR)	1	13	14
5	Japan (JPN)	3	12	15
6	Hong Kong (HKG)	9	11	20
7	Vietnam (VIE)	10	24	34
8	India (IND)	15	19	34
9	Uzbekistan (UZB)	17	21	38
10	Philippines (PHI)	14	26	40
11	Thailand (THA)	18	29	47
12	Oman (OMA)	22	27	49
13	Mongolia (MGL)	23	28	51

== Results ==
Table of 16
9	Uzbekistan	45
8	India	29
5	Japan	45
12	Oman	36
13	Mongolia	20
4	South Korea	45
11	Thailand	27
6	Hong Kong	45
7	Vietnam	45
10	Philippines	29

Quarterfinals
1	Singapore	42
9	Uzbekistan	41
5	Japan	40
4	South Korea	45
3	Kazakhstan	45
6	Hong Kong	35
2	China	45
7	Vietnam	17

Semifinals
1	Singapore	35
4	South Korea	45
3	Kazakhstan	21
2	China	45

Gold medal match
4	South Korea	28
2	China	45

== Final standing ==
Rank	Team
1st place, gold medalist(s)	China (CHN); Liu Chang; Tang Junyao; Yang Jingwen; Yu Sihan
2nd place, silver medalist(s)	South Korea (KOR); Lee Hye-in; Lim Tae-hee; Song Se-ra; Yang Seung-hye
3rd place, bronze medalist(s)	Kazakhstan (KAZ); Vladislava Andreyeva; Irina Bakaldina; Sofiya Nikolaichuk; Daria Samodelkina
3rd place, bronze medalist(s)	Singapore (SGP); Filzah Hidayah Binte Nor Anuar; Kiria Tikanah; Elle Koh; Esther Tan
5	Japan (JPN); Rin Kishimoto; Sungyoun No; Tamaki Terayama; Miho Yoshimura
6	Hong Kong (HKG); Chan Wai Ling; Chu Ka Mong; Kaylin Hsieh; Wu Haidi
7	Vietnam (VIE); Nguyễn Phương Kim; Nguyễn Thị Kiều Oanh; Trần Thị Thùy Trinh
8	Uzbekistan (UZB); Malika Khakimova; Dilnaz Murzataeva; Sanam Nazarova
9	India (IND); Anupriya; Mitva Jesangbhai Chaudhari; Yashkeerat Kaur Hayer; Taniksha Khatri
10	Philippines (PHI); Janna Allysah Catantan; Samantha Kyle Catantan; Juliana Gomez; Alexa Larrazabal
11	Thailand (THA); Chanyanuch Klaiduang; Pornchita Puengkuntod; Natpapat Sangngio; Mooktapa Thiankul
12	Oman (OMA); Salma Al Dighaishi; Jana Al Sharji; Israa Al Siyabi
13	Mongolia (MGL); Myagmartseren Altangerel; Batsaikhany Amarzayaa; Mercy Damdinpurev; Undral Tsogbayar
