= Fencing at the 2026 Asian Games – Women's individual épée =

Women's individual épée at the 2026 Asian Games
- Venue: Aichi Sky Expo Hall F
- Date: 22 September 2026
- Competitors: 31 from 18 nations

Medalists
| gold medal | Song Se-ra | South Korea |
| silver medal | Kiria Tikanah | Singapore |
| bronze medal | Tamaki Terayama | Japan |
| bronze medal | Yang Jingwen | China |

The women's individual épée competition at the 2026 Asian Games in Nagoya was held on 22 September 2026 at the Aichi Sky Expo Hall F. South Korea's Song Se-ra defeated Kiria Tikanah of Singapore 15–8 in the final to win the gold medal.

== Schedule ==
All times are Japan Standard Time (UTC+09:00)

| Date | Time | Event |
|---|---|---|
| Tuesday, 22 September 2026 | 11:45 | Round of pools |
| Tuesday, 22 September 2026 | 13:50 | Table of 32 |
| Tuesday, 22 September 2026 | 14:50 | Table of 16 |
| Tuesday, 22 September 2026 | 15:30 | Quarterfinals |
| Tuesday, 22 September 2026 | 18:30 | Semifinals |
| Tuesday, 22 September 2026 | 19:30 | Gold medal bout |

== Results ==
=== Round of pools ===
==== Pool 1 ====
| Athlete | KOR | VIE | OMA | UZB | HKG | INA | MGL |
|---|---|---|---|---|---|---|---|
| Song Se-ra (KOR) | — | 5–3 | 5–2 | 4–1 | 5–2 | 5–1 | 5–1 |
| Trần Thị Thùy Trinh (VIE) | 3–5 | — | 5–3 | 5–2 | 5–4 | 5–3 | 5–4 |
| Jana Al Sharji (OMA) | 2–5 | 3–5 | — | 5–4 | 2–5 | 5–3 | 4–5 |
| Dilnaz Murzataeva (UZB) | 1–4 | 2–5 | 4–5 | — | 3–5 | 5–2 | 5–0 |
| Chan Wai Ling (HKG) | 2–5 | 4–5 | 5–2 | 5–3 | — | 5–1 | 5–3 |
| Fadilah Aprilia Budifirdausi (INA) | 1–5 | 3–5 | 3–5 | 2–5 | 1–5 | — | 2–5 |
| Batsaikhany Amarzayaa (MGL) | 1–5 | 4–5 | 5–4 | 0–5 | 3–5 | 5–2 | — |

Legend: Blue = left column team win; Red = top row team win.

==== Pool 2 ====
| Athlete | CHN | UZB | SGP | IND | VIE | PHI |
|---|---|---|---|---|---|---|
| Tang Junyao (CHN) | — | 4–5 | 3–4 | 5–4 | 5–0 | 5–2 |
| Malika Khakimova (UZB) | 5–4 | — | 4–5 | 3–5 | 5–4 | 5–3 |
| Elle Koh (SGP) | 4–3 | 5–4 | — | 5–2 | 5–4 | 5–3 |
| Mitva Jesangbhai Chaudhari (IND) | 4–5 | 5–3 | 2–5 | — | 5–4 | 3–4 |
| Nguyễn Phương Kim (VIE) | 0–5 | 4–5 | 4–5 | 4–5 | — | 5–3 |
| Alexa Larrazabal (PHI) | 2–5 | 3–5 | 3–5 | 4–3 | 3–5 | — |

Legend: Blue = left column team win; Red = top row team win.

==== Pool 3 ====
| Athlete | HKG | JPN | OMA | THA | KUW | SGP |
|---|---|---|---|---|---|---|
| Kaylin Hsieh (HKG) | — | 5–4 | 5–1 | 5–2 | 5–0 | 5–2 |
| Miho Yoshimura (JPN) | 4–5 | — | 5–2 | 5–3 | 5–3 | 4–5 |
| Salma Al Dighaishi (OMA) | 1–5 | 2–5 | — | 5–4 | 2–5 | 2–5 |
| Mooktapa Thiankul (THA) | 2–5 | 3–5 | 4–5 | — | 3–5 | 1–5 |
| Fawzia Alrefae (KUW) | 0–5 | 3–5 | 5–2 | 5–3 | — | 4–5 |
| Kiria Tikanah (SGP) | 2–5 | 5–4 | 5–2 | 5–1 | 5–4 | — |

Legend: Blue = left column team win; Red = top row team win.

==== Pool 4 ====
| Athlete | MGL | IND | UAE | KAZ | KOR | THA |
|---|---|---|---|---|---|---|
| Mercy Damdinpurev (MGL) | — | 3–5 | 4–5 | 1–5 | 2–5 | 4–5 |
| Taniksha Khatri (IND) | 5–3 | — | 5–4 | 1–5 | 5–4 | 4–5 |
| Zainab Al-Hosani (UAE) | 5–4 | 4–5 | — | 2–5 | 2–5 | 4–5 |
| Irina Bakaldina (KAZ) | 5–1 | 5–1 | 5–2 | — | 5–3 | 5–1 |
| Lim Tae-hee (KOR) | 5–2 | 4–5 | 5–2 | 3–5 | — | 5–3 |
| Natpapat Sangngio (THA) | 5–4 | 5–4 | 5–4 | 1–5 | 3–5 | — |

Legend: Blue = left column team win; Red = top row team win.

==== Pool 5 ====
| Athlete | PHI | KAZ | CHN | JPN | JOR | KGZ |
|---|---|---|---|---|---|---|
| Juliana Gomez (PHI) | — | 2–5 | 5–2 | 4–5 | 5–4 | 5–2 |
| Vladislava Andreyeva (KAZ) | 5–2 | — | 3–5 | 5–4 | 5–3 | 5–3 |
| Yang Jingwen (CHN) | 2–5 | 5–3 | — | 4–3 | 4–5 | 5–2 |
| Tamaki Terayama (JPN) | 5–4 | 4–5 | 3–4 | — | 5–2 | 5–3 |
| Dina Mansi (JOR) | 4–5 | 3–5 | 5–4 | 2–5 | — | 5–2 |
| Akak Kanatovna Keneshova (KGZ) | 2–5 | 3–5 | 2–5 | 3–5 | 2–5 | — |

Legend: Blue = left column team win; Red = top row team win.

==== Summary ====
| Rank | Pool | Athlete | W | L | W/M | TD | TF |
|---|---|---|---|---|---|---|---|
| 1 | 1 | Song Se-ra (KOR) | 6 | 0 | 1.000 | +19 | 29 |
| 2 | 4 | Irina Bakaldina (KAZ) | 5 | 0 | 1.000 | +17 | 25 |
| 3 | 3 | Kaylin Hsieh (HKG) | 5 | 0 | 1.000 | +16 | 25 |
| 4 | 2 | Elle Koh (SGP) | 5 | 0 | 1.000 | +8 | 24 |
| 5 | 1 | Trần Thị Thùy Trinh (VIE) | 5 | 1 | 0.833 | +7 | 28 |
| 6 | 5 | Vladislava Andreyeva (KAZ) | 4 | 1 | 0.800 | +6 | 23 |
| 7 | 3 | Kiria Tikanah (SGP) | 4 | 1 | 0.800 | +6 | 22 |
| 8 | 1 | Chan Wai Ling (HKG) | 4 | 2 | 0.667 | +7 | 26 |
| 9 | 2 | Tang Junyao (CHN) | 3 | 2 | 0.600 | +7 | 22 |
| 10 | 3 | Miho Yoshimura (JPN) | 3 | 2 | 0.600 | +5 | 23 |
| 11 | 4 | Lim Tae-hee (KOR) | 3 | 2 | 0.600 | +5 | 22 |
| 12 | 5 | Tamaki Terayama (JPN) | 3 | 2 | 0.600 | +4 | 22 |
| 13 | 5 | Juliana Gomez (PHI) | 3 | 2 | 0.600 | +3 | 21 |
| 14 | 5 | Yang Jingwen (CHN) | 3 | 2 | 0.600 | +2 | 20 |
| 15 | 2 | Malika Khakimova (UZB) | 3 | 2 | 0.600 | +1 | 22 |
| 16 | 4 | Taniksha Khatri (IND) | 3 | 2 | 0.600 | −1 | 20 |
| 17 | 4 | Natpapat Sangngio (THA) | 3 | 2 | 0.600 | −3 | 19 |
| 18 | 2 | Mitva Jesangbhai Chaudhari (IND) | 2 | 3 | 0.400 | −2 | 19 |
| 18 | 5 | Dina Mansi (JOR) | 2 | 3 | 0.400 | −2 | 19 |
| 20 | 3 | Fawzia Alrefae (KUW) | 2 | 3 | 0.400 | −3 | 17 |
| 21 | 1 | Dilnaz Murzataeva (UZB) | 2 | 4 | 0.333 | −1 | 20 |
| 22 | 1 | Jana Al Sharji (OMA) | 2 | 4 | 0.333 | −6 | 21 |
| 23 | 1 | Batsaikhany Amarzayaa (MGL) | 2 | 4 | 0.333 | −8 | 18 |
| 24 | 2 | Nguyễn Phương Kim (VIE) | 1 | 4 | 0.200 | −6 | 17 |
| 25 | 4 | Zainab Al-Hosani (UAE) | 1 | 4 | 0.200 | −7 | 17 |
| 26 | 2 | Alexa Larrazabal (PHI) | 1 | 4 | 0.200 | −8 | 15 |
| 27 | 3 | Salma Al Dighaishi (OMA) | 1 | 4 | 0.200 | −12 | 12 |
| 28 | 4 | Mercy Damdinpurev (MGL) | 0 | 5 | 0.000 | −11 | 14 |
| 29 | 3 | Mooktapa Thiankul (THA) | 0 | 5 | 0.000 | −12 | 13 |
| 30 | 5 | Akak Kanatovna Keneshova (KGZ) | 0 | 5 | 0.000 | −13 | 12 |
| 31 | 1 | Fadilah Aprilia Budifirdausi (INA) | 0 | 6 | 0.000 | −18 | 12 |

=== Knockout round ===
==== Final ====
| Gold medal bout |
| 1 | Song Se-ra (KOR) | 15 |
| 7 | Kiria Tikanah (SGP) | 8 |

==== Top half ====
Table of 32
17 | Natpapat Sangngio (THA) | 10
16 | Taniksha Khatri (IND) | 15
9 | Tang Junyao (CHN) | 15
24 | Nguyễn Phương Kim (VIE) | 3
25 | Zainab Al-Hosani (UAE) | 5
8 | Chan Wai Ling (HKG) | 15
21 | Dilnaz Murzataeva (UZB) | 14
12 | Tamaki Terayama (JPN) | 15
13 | Juliana Gomez (PHI) | 15
20 | Fawzia Alrefae (KUW) | 8

Table of 16
1 | Song Se-ra (KOR) | 15
16 | Taniksha Khatri (IND) | 9
9 | Tang Junyao (CHN) | 15
8 | Chan Wai Ling (HKG) | 7
5 | Trần Thị Thùy Trinh (VIE) | 11
12 | Tamaki Terayama (JPN) | 15
13 | Juliana Gomez (PHI) | 1
4 | Elle Koh (SGP) | 3

Quarterfinals
1 | Song Se-ra (KOR) | 15
9 | Tang Junyao (CHN) | 14
12 | Tamaki Terayama (JPN) | 15
4 | Elle Koh (SGP) | 11

Semifinals
1 | Song Se-ra (KOR) | 15
12 | Tamaki Terayama (JPN) | 14

==== Bottom half ====
Table of 32
19 | Mitva Jesangbhai Chaudhari (IND) | 14
14 | Yang Jingwen (CHN) | 15
11 | Lim Tae-hee (KOR) | 15
22 | Jana Al Sharji (OMA) | 9
23 | Batsaikhany Amarzayaa (MGL) | 7
10 | Miho Yoshimura (JPN) | 15
15 | Malika Khakimova (UZB) | 14
18 | Dina Mansi (JOR) | 15

Table of 16
3 | Kaylin Hsieh (HKG) | 13
14 | Yang Jingwen (CHN) | 15
11 | Lim Tae-hee (KOR) | 13
6 | Vladislava Andreyeva (KAZ) | 15
7 | Kiria Tikanah (SGP) | 14
10 | Miho Yoshimura (JPN) | 13
18 | Dina Mansi (JOR) | 7
2 | Irina Bakaldina (KAZ) | 15

Quarterfinals
14 | Yang Jingwen (CHN) | 15
6 | Vladislava Andreyeva (KAZ) | 10
7 | Kiria Tikanah (SGP) | 15
2 | Irina Bakaldina (KAZ) | 14

Semifinals
14 | Yang Jingwen (CHN) | 14
7 | Kiria Tikanah (SGP) | 15

== Final standing ==
| Rank | Athlete |
|---|---|
| 1st place, gold medalist(s) | Song Se-ra (KOR) |
| 2nd place, silver medalist(s) | Kiria Tikanah (SGP) |
| 3rd place, bronze medalist(s) | Tamaki Terayama (JPN) |
| 3rd place, bronze medalist(s) | Yang Jingwen (CHN) |
| 5 | Irina Bakaldina (KAZ) |
| 6 | Elle Koh (SGP) |
| 7 | Vladislava Andreyeva (KAZ) |
| 8 | Tang Junyao (CHN) |
| 9 | Kaylin Hsieh (HKG) |
| 10 | Trần Thị Thùy Trinh (VIE) |
| 11 | Chan Wai Ling (HKG) |
| 12 | Miho Yoshimura (JPN) |
| 13 | Lim Tae-hee (KOR) |
| 14 | Juliana Gomez (PHI) |
| 15 | Taniksha Khatri (IND) |
| 16 | Dina Mansi (JOR) |
| 17 | Malika Khakimova (UZB) |
| 18 | Natpapat Sangngio (THA) |
| 19 | Mitva Jesangbhai Chaudhari (IND) |
| 20 | Fawzia Alrefae (KUW) |
| 21 | Dilnaz Murzataeva (UZB) |
| 22 | Jana Al Sharji (OMA) |
| 23 | Batsaikhany Amarzayaa (MGL) |
| 24 | Nguyễn Phương Kim (VIE) |
| 25 | Zainab Al-Hosani (UAE) |
| 26 | Alexa Larrazabal (PHI) |
| 27 | Salma Al Dighaishi (OMA) |
| 28 | Mercy Damdinpurev (MGL) |
| 29 | Mooktapa Thiankul (THA) |
| 30 | Akak Kanatovna Keneshova (KGZ) |
| 31 | Fadilah Aprilia Budifirdausi (INA) |
