= Fencing at the 2022 Asian Games – Women's team épée =

Women's team épée at the 2022 Asian Games
- Venue: Hangzhou Dianzi University Gymnasium
- Date: 27 September 2023
- Competitors: 42 from 11 nations

Medalists
gold medal	South Korea; Choi In-jeong, Kang Young-mi, Lee Hye-in, Song Se-ra
silver medal	Hong Kong; Chan Wai Ling, Chu Ka Mong, Kaylin Hsieh, Vivian Kong
bronze medal	China; Shi Yuexin, Sun Yiwen, Tang Junyao, Xu Nuo
bronze medal	Japan; Haruna Baba, Hana Saito, Nozomi Sato, Miho Yoshimura

The women's team épée competition at the 2022 Asian Games in Hangzhou was held on 27 September 2023 at the Hangzhou Dianzi University Gymnasium.

== Schedule ==
All times are China Standard Time (UTC+08:00)

Date	Time	Event
Wednesday, 27 September 2022	13:00	Table of 16
Wednesday, 27 September 2022	14:30	Quarterfinals
Wednesday, 27 September 2022	16:00	Semifinals
Wednesday, 27 September 2022	19:05	Gold medal match

== Seeding ==
The teams were seeded taking into account the results achieved by competitors representing each team in the individual event.

Rank	Team	Fencer		Total
Rank	Team	1	2	Total
1	South Korea (KOR)	1	2	3
2	Hong Kong (HKG)	3	9	12
3	Uzbekistan (UZB)	3	11	14
4	Kazakhstan (KAZ)	5	10	15
5	China (CHN)	6	13	19
6	Japan (JPN)	8	14	22
7	Singapore (SGP)	12	15	27
8	India (IND)	7	21	28
9	Jordan (JOR)	16	19	35
10	Thailand (THA)	18	22	40
11	Mongolia (MGL)	25	27	52

== Results ==
Table of 16
9	Jordan	36
8	India	45
11	Mongolia	20
6	Japan	45
7	Singapore	45
10	Thailand	32

Quarterfinals
1	South Korea	45
8	India	25
5	China	45
4	Kazakhstan	39
3	Uzbekistan	32
6	Japan	45
7	Singapore	25
2	Hong Kong	45

Semifinals
1	South Korea	30
5	China	27
6	Japan	26
2	Hong Kong	45

Gold medal match
1	South Korea	36
2	Hong Kong	34

== Final standing ==
Rank	Team
1st place, gold medalist(s)	South Korea (KOR); Choi In-jeong; Kang Young-mi; Lee Hye-in; Song Se-ra
2nd place, silver medalist(s)	Hong Kong (HKG); Chan Wai Ling; Chu Ka Mong; Kaylin Hsieh; Vivian Kong
3rd place, bronze medalist(s)	China (CHN); Shi Yuexin; Sun Yiwen; Tang Junyao; Xu Nuo
3rd place, bronze medalist(s)	Japan (JPN); Haruna Baba; Hana Saito; Nozomi Sato; Miho Yoshimura
5	Uzbekistan (UZB); Shakhzoda Egamberdieva; Malika Khakimova; Dilnaz Murzataeva
6	Kazakhstan (KAZ); Vladislava Andreyeva; Sofiya Nikolaichuk; Ulyana Pistsova; Alexandra Tambovtseva
7	Singapore (SGP); Filzah Hidayah Nor Anuar; Elle Koh; Cheryl Lim; Kiria Tikanah
8	India (IND); Ena Arora; Jyotika Dutta; Yashkeerat Kaur Hayer; Taniksha Khatri
9	Jordan (JOR); Shahed Al-Kloub; Roaa Majali; Dina Mansi
10	Thailand (THA); Sasiporn Poonket; Korawan Thanee; Pacharaporn Vasanasomsithi; Warisa Winya
11	Mongolia (MGL); Batsaikhany Amarzayaa; Ganboldyn Khaliunaa; Altangereliin Myagmartseren; Ochirkhuyagiin Zolboo
