= Fencing at the 2022 Asian Games – Women's individual épée =

Women's individual épée at the 2022 Asian Games
- Venue: Hangzhou Dianzi University Gymnasium
- Date: 24 September 2023
- Competitors: 30 from 16 nations

Medalists
gold medal	Choi In-jeong	South Korea
silver medal	Song Se-ra	South Korea
bronze medal	Vivian Kong	Hong Kong
bronze medal	Dilnaz Murzataeva	Uzbekistan

The women's individual épée competition at the 2022 Asian Games in Hangzhou was held on 24 September 2023 at the Hangzhou Dianzi University Gymnasium.

== Schedule ==
All times are China Standard Time (UTC+08:00)

Date	Time	Event
Sunday, 24 September 2023	12:30	Round of pools
Sunday, 24 September 2023	14:45	Table of 32
Sunday, 24 September 2023	16:00	Table of 16
Sunday, 24 September 2023	17:15	Quarterfinals
Sunday, 24 September 2023	19:05	Semifinals
Sunday, 24 September 2023	20:45	Gold medal bout

== Results ==
=== Round of pools ===
==== Pool 1 ====
Athlete	HKG	KAZ	CHN	MGL	PHI	JOR
Vivian Kong (HKG)	—	4–5	3–5	5–2	5–2	5–2
Sofiya Nikolaichuk (KAZ)	5–4	—	5–1	5–3	5–3	5–4
Xu Nuo (CHN)	5–3	1–5	—	5–3	5–0	5–0
Batsaikhany Amarzayaa (MGL)	2–5	3–5	3–5	—	2–5	2–5
Juliana Gomez (PHI)	2–5	3–5	0–5	5–2	—	2–5
Shahed Al-Kloub (JOR)	2–5	4–5	0–5	5–2	5–2	—

==== Pool 2 ====
Athlete	KOR	IND	SGP	PHI	MGL	YEM
Song Se-ra (KOR)	—	5–3	5–4	5–0	5–1	5–0
Taniksha Khatri (IND)	3–5	—	1–5	5–1	5–0	5–1
Elle Koh (SGP)	4–5	5–1	—	5–3	5–0	5–0
Ivy Dinoy (PHI)	0–5	1–5	3–5	—	5–2	5–0
Ochirkhuyagiin Zolboo (MGL)	1–5	0–5	0–5	2–5	—	5–0
Samah Al-Shami (YEM)	0–5	1–5	0–5	0–5	0–5	—

==== Pool 3 ====
Athlete	CHN	SGP	THA	UZB	UAE	JOR
Sun Yiwen (CHN)	—	5–2	5–1	4–5	5–2	5–2
Kiria Tikanah (SGP)	2–5	—	5–3	3–5	5–2	5–2
Pacharaporn Vasanasomsithi (THA)	1–5	3–5	—	2–5	5–1	2–4
Shakhzoda Egamberdieva (UZB)	5–4	5–3	5–2	—	4–3	5–2
Zainab Al-Hosani (UAE)	2–5	2–5	1–5	3–4	—	2–3
Dina Mansi (JOR)	2–5	2–5	4–2	2–5	3–2	—

==== Pool 4 ====
Athlete	KOR	JPN	UZB	THA	UAE	CAM
Choi In-jeong (KOR)	—	5–2	5–4	5–3	5–0	5–2
Miho Yoshimura (JPN)	2–5	—	5–4	5–3	3–2	5–3
Dilnaz Murzataeva (UZB)	4–5	4–5	—	5–1	4–1	5–1
Korawan Thanee (THA)	3–5	3–5	1–5	—	5–3	5–3
Shaikha Al-Zaabi (UAE)	0–5	2–3	1–4	3–5	—	5–1
Men Monika (CAM)	2–5	3–5	1–5	3–5	1–5	—

==== Pool 5 ====
Athlete	HKG	JPN	KAZ	IND	KGZ	YEM
Kaylin Hsieh (HKG)	—	2–0	4–3	3–2	5–0	5–0
Nozomi Sato (JPN)	0–2	—	2–5	5–3	5–1	5–1
Ulyana Pistsova (KAZ)	3–4	5–2	—	5–2	5–2	5–0
Ena Arora (IND)	2–3	3–5	2–5	—	4–5	5–1
Kamilia Abdyl-Khamitova (KGZ)	0–5	1–5	2–5	5–4	—	5–2
Nada Al-Ahdal (YEM)	0–5	1–5	0–5	1–5	2–5	—

==== Summary ====
Rank	Pool	Athlete	W	L	W/M	TD	TF
1	2	Song Se-ra (KOR)	5	0	1.000	+17	25
2	4	Choi In-jeong (KOR)	5	0	1.000	+14	25
3	5	Kaylin Hsieh (HKG)	5	0	1.000	+14	19
4	1	Sofiya Nikolaichuk (KAZ)	5	0	1.000	+10	25
5	3	Shakhzoda Egamberdieva (UZB)	5	0	1.000	+10	24
6	2	Elle Koh (SGP)	4	1	0.800	+15	24
7	5	Ulyana Pistsova (KAZ)	4	1	0.800	+13	23
8	3	Sun Yiwen (CHN)	4	1	0.800	+12	24
9	1	Xu Nuo (CHN)	4	1	0.800	+10	21
10	4	Miho Yoshimura (JPN)	4	1	0.800	+3	20
11	4	Dilnaz Murzataeva (UZB)	3	2	0.600	+9	22
12	2	Taniksha Khatri (IND)	3	2	0.600	+7	19
13	1	Vivian Kong (HKG)	3	2	0.600	+6	22
14	5	Nozomi Sato (JPN)	3	2	0.600	+5	17
15	3	Kiria Tikanah (SGP)	3	2	0.600	+3	20
16	1	Shahed Al-Kloub (JOR)	2	3	0.400	–3	16
17	2	Ivy Dinoy (PHI)	2	3	0.400	–3	14
18	4	Korawan Thanee (THA)	2	3	0.400	–4	17
19	3	Dina Mansi (JOR)	2	3	0.400	−6	13
20	5	Kamilia Abdyl-Khamitova (KGZ)	2	3	0.400	−8	13
21	5	Ena Arora (IND)	1	4	0.200	−3	16
22	3	Pacharaporn Vasanasomsithi (THA)	1	4	0.200	−7	13
23	4	Shaikha Al-Zaabi (UAE)	1	4	0.200	−7	11
24	1	Juliana Gomez (PHI)	1	4	0.200	−10	12
25	2	Ochirkhuyagiin Zolboo (MGL)	1	4	0.200	−12	8
26	3	Zainab Al-Hosani (UAE)	0	5	0.000	−12	10
27	1	Batsaikhany Amarzayaa (MGL)	0	5	0.000	−13	12
28	4	Men Monika (CAM)	0	5	0.000	−15	10
29	5	Nada Al-Ahdal (YEM)	0	5	0.000	−21	4
30	2	Samah Al-Shami (YEM)	0	5	0.000	−24	1

=== Knockout round ===
==== Final ====
Gold medal bout
1	Song Se-ra (KOR)	8
2	Choi In-jeong (KOR)	9

==== Top half ====
Table of 32
17	Ivy Dinoy (PHI)	13
16	Shahed Al-Kloub (JOR)	15
9	Xu Nuo (CHN)	15
24	Juliana Gomez (PHI)	8
21	Ena Arora (IND)	11
12	Taniksha Khatri (IND)	15
13	Vivian Kong (HKG)	15
20	Kamilia Abdyl-Khamitova (KGZ)	2

Table of 16
1	Song Se-ra (KOR)	15
16	Shahed Al-Kloub (JOR)	8
9	Xu Nuo (CHN)	9
8	Sun Yiwen (CHN)	15
5	Shakhzoda Egamberdieva (UZB)	10
12	Taniksha Khatri (IND)	15
13	Vivian Kong (HKG)	2
4	Sofiya Nikolaichuk (KAZ)	2

Quarterfinals
1	Song Se-ra (KOR)	14
8	Sun Yiwen (CHN)	12
12	Taniksha Khatri (IND)	7
13	Vivian Kong (HKG)	15

Semifinals
1	Song Se-ra (KOR)	15
13	Vivian Kong (HKG)	11

==== Bottom half ====
Table of 32
19	Dina Mansi (JOR)	8
14	Nozomi Sato (JPN)	15
11	Dilnaz Murzataeva (UZB)	15
22	Pacharaporn Vasanasomsithi (THA)	6
23	Shaikha Al-Zaabi (UAE)	3
10	Miho Yoshimura (JPN)	15
15	Kiria Tikanah (SGP)	15
18	Korawan Thanee (THA)	7

Table of 16
3	Kaylin Hsieh (HKG)	11
14	Nozomi Sato (JPN)	13
11	Dilnaz Murzataeva (UZB)	15
6	Elle Koh (SGP)	12
7	Ulyana Pistsova (KAZ)	15
10	Miho Yoshimura (JPN)	9
15	Kiria Tikanah (SGP)	11
2	Choi In-jeong (KOR)	15

Quarterfinals
14	Nozomi Sato (JPN)	14
11	Dilnaz Murzataeva (UZB)	15
7	Ulyana Pistsova (KAZ)	7
2	Choi In-jeong (KOR)	15

Semifinals
11	Dilnaz Murzataeva (UZB)	12
2	Choi In-jeong (KOR)	15

== Final standing ==
Rank	Athlete
1st place, gold medalist(s)	Choi In-jeong (KOR)
2nd place, silver medalist(s)	Song Se-ra (KOR)
3rd place, bronze medalist(s)	Vivian Kong (HKG)
3rd place, bronze medalist(s)	Dilnaz Murzataeva (UZB)
5	Ulyana Pistsova (KAZ)
6	Sun Yiwen (CHN)
7	Taniksha Khatri (IND)
8	Nozomi Sato (JPN)
9	Kaylin Hsieh (HKG)
10	Sofiya Nikolaichuk (KAZ)
11	Shakhzoda Egamberdieva (UZB)
12	Elle Koh (SGP)
13	Xu Nuo (CHN)
14	Miho Yoshimura (JPN)
15	Kiria Tikanah (SGP)
16	Shahed Al-Kloub (JOR)
17	Ivy Dinoy (PHI)
18	Korawan Thanee (THA)
19	Dina Mansi (JOR)
20	Kamilia Abdyl-Khamitova (KGZ)
21	Ena Arora (IND)
22	Pacharaporn Vasanasomsithi (THA)
23	Shaikha Al-Zaabi (UAE)
24	Juliana Gomez (PHI)
25	Ochirkhuyagiin Zolboo (MGL)
26	Zainab Al-Hosani (UAE)
27	Batsaikhany Amarzayaa (MGL)
28	Men Monika (CAM)
29	Nada Al-Ahdal (YEM)
30	Samah Al-Shami (YEM)
