= Women's épée at the 2026 World Fencing Championships =

- Venue: AsiaWorld–Expo
- Location: Hong Kong
- Dates: 22 July (preliminaries); 25 July (finals)
- Competitors: 188 from 72 nations

Medalists
gold medal	Song Se-ra	South Korea
silver medal	Giulia Rizzi	Italy
bronze medal	Barbara Brych	Poland
bronze medal	Tang Junyao	China

The Women's épée competition at the 2026 World Fencing Championships was held on 22 and 25 July 2026.

== Draw ==
=== Finals ===
Semifinals
(Italy) Giulia Rizzi	15
(Poland) Barbara Brych	6
(South Korea) Song Se-ra	15
(China) Tang Junyao	10

Final
(Italy) Giulia Rizzi	8
(South Korea) Song Se-ra	9

=== Top half ===
==== Section 1 ====
Round of 64
(Italy) Alberta Santuccio	15
(Romania) Emma Șonț	11
(Poland) Magdalena Pawłowska	11
(Sweden) Emma Fransson	10
(United States) Tierna Oxenreider	15
(Hong Kong) Chu Ka Mong	14
(Spain) Daniela Pinyol	12
(Canada) Ruien Xiao	15
(Kenya) Alexandra Ndolo	13
(China) Yu Sihan	15
(Kazakhstan) Sofiya Nikolaichuk	10
(Canada) Julia Yin	15
(Switzerland) Aurore Favre	15
(Spain) Dana Raposo	10
(India) Prachi Lohan	14
(Italy) Giulia Rizzi	15

Round of 32
(Italy) Alberta Santuccio	14
(Poland) Magdalena Pawłowska	10
(United States) Tierna Oxenreider	11
(Canada) Ruien Xiao	15
(China) Yu Sihan	15
(Canada) Julia Yin	13
(Switzerland) Aurore Favre	11
(Italy) Giulia Rizzi	15

Round of 16
(Italy) Alberta Santuccio	15
(Canada) Ruien Xiao	13
(China) Yu Sihan	12
(Italy) Giulia Rizzi	13

Quarterfinals
(Italy) Alberta Santuccio	7
(Italy) Giulia Rizzi	15

==== Section 2 ====
Round of 64
(United States) Hadley Husisian	15
(Canada) Nicole Xuan	5
(Ukraine) Emily Conrad	13
(Kazakhstan) Irina Bakaldina	12
(Switzerland) Pauline Brunner	15
(Spain) Silvia Gómez	5
(Chinese Taipei) Hung Li-hsiang	9
(South Korea) Lim Tae-hee	15
(Italy) Rossella Fiamingo	14
(Japan) Tamaki Terayama	15
(Sweden) Liv Olsson	15
(Germany) Alexandra Ehler	13
(Austria) Luise Elmer	9
(Poland) Barbara Brych	15
(Czech Republic) Veronika Bieleszová	6
(Hungary) Eszter Muhari	15

Round of 32
(United States) Hadley Husisian	15
(Ukraine) Emily Conrad	9
(Switzerland) Pauline Brunner	15
(South Korea) Lim Tae-hee	11
(Japan) Tamaki Terayama	15
(Sweden) Liv Olsson	10
(Poland) Barbara Brych	15
(Hungary) Eszter Muhari	12

Round of 16
(United States) Hadley Husisian	15
(Switzerland) Pauline Brunner	11
(Japan) Tamaki Terayama	8
(Poland) Barbara Brych	15

Quarterfinals
(United States) Hadley Husisian	13
(Poland) Barbara Brych	14

=== Bottom half ===
==== Section 3 ====
Round of 64
(South Korea) Song Se-ra	13
(Romania) Natalia Constantin	7
(Japan) Rin Kishimoto	15
(India) Taniksha Khatri	12
(Argentina) Isabel Di Tella	9
(Germany) Fiona Müller	15
(Uzbekistan) Dilnaz Murzataeva	11
(Hong Kong) Kaylin Hsieh	15
(United States) Catherine Nixon	10
(France) Auriane Mallo-Breton	15
(Paraguay) Montserrat Viveros	13
(Russia) Kristina Yasinskaya	14
(Germany) Gala Hess Sancho	15
(Russia) Iana Bekmurzova	14
(Estonia) Veronika Zuikova	14
(France) Marie-Florence Candassamy	15

Round of 32
(South Korea) Song Se-ra	15
(Japan) Rin Kishimoto	4
(Germany) Fiona Müller	14
(Hong Kong) Kaylin Hsieh	13
(France) Auriane Mallo-Breton	15
(Russia) Kristina Yasinskaya	13
(Germany) Gala Hess Sancho	15
(France) Marie-Florence Candassamy	13

Round of 16
(South Korea) Song Se-ra	15
(Germany) Fiona Müller	7
(France) Auriane Mallo-Breton	15
(Germany) Gala Hess Sancho	9

Quarterfinals
(South Korea) Song Se-ra	11
(France) Auriane Mallo-Breton	7

==== Section 4 ====
Round of 64
(France) Alexandra Louis-Marie	11
(Hong Kong) Haidi Wu	15
(Algeria) Charline Boukhelifa	7
(China) Tang Junyao	15
(United States) Anna van Brummen	9
(Italy) Gaia Caforio	15
(Singapore) Elle Koh	11
(Ukraine) Anna Maksymenko	15
(Poland) Alicja Klasik	15
(Georgia (country)) Tamila Muridova	14
(Hungary) Blanka Nagy	15
(Estonia) Irina Embrich	8
(South Korea) Yang Seung-hye	14
(Russia) Anastasiia Rustamova	15
(Finland) Suvi Lehtonen	5
(Estonia) Katrina Lehis	15

Round of 32
(Hong Kong) Haidi Wu	11
(China) Tang Junyao	15
(Italy) Gaia Caforio	11
(Ukraine) Anna Maksymenko	10
(Poland) Alicja Klasik	13
(Hungary) Blanka Nagy	15
(Russia) Anastasiia Rustamova	15
(Estonia) Katrina Lehis	4

Round of 16
(China) Tang Junyao	15
(Italy) Gaia Caforio	14
(Hungary) Blanka Nagy	11
(Russia) Anastasiia Rustamova	15

Quarterfinals
(China) Tang Junyao	15
(Russia) Anastasiia Rustamova	14
