= Goyang Global High School =

High school in Goyang, South Korea

Coordinates: 37°41′03″N 126°48′32″E

- Korean: 고양국제고등학교; Hanja: 高陽國際高等學校
- South Korea

Information
- Type: Public Specialized High School
- Motto: "Be the Bridge to the Future"
- Established: March 2011
- Principal: Py, Young Ro (피영로)
- Staff: 72 (2026)
- Grades: 10–12
- Enrollment: 589 (2026)
- Language: Korean, English, Spanish, Japanese, Chinese

Goyang Global High School (Korean: 고양국제고등학교) is a high school in Gyeonggi Province, Goyang City, South Korea. The school opened in 2011.

Goyang Global High School offers a curriculum oriented toward Korean university admissions. The school’s published curriculum currently lists specialized international-studies courses such as international politics, macroeconomics, and social inquiry methods, but does not include Advanced Placement (AP) courses or a separate overseas university preparation track.

Goyang Global High School recorded 18 Seoul National University admits in the 2025, which is the highest number among non-Seoul foreign-language and international(global) high schools. In the 2026 early admissions results, the school ranked 12th nationally among Korean high schools, with 13 admitted students.

Goyang Global High School has participated in global exchange programs with overseas schools since its founding in 2011. In 2024, it was selected as a “United Nations Global Academy” school by the Ministry of Patriots and Veterans Affairs and hosted students and teachers from Stroud High School in the United Kingdom for regular classes, cultural activities, historical site visits, and homestays.

The school was also the setting for several episodes of JTBC’s variety program Welcome Back to School in 2015.

In 2018, students and alumni led a successful campaign to prevent two school security guards from being dismissed. Students collected signatures from 541 of the school’s 600 students, and held a press conference calling for the guards to remain employed; the Gyeonggi Provincial Office of Education conceded, stating that the renewal of the guards’ contracts was within the principal’s discretion.
