= Zuikov =

Zuikov or Zuykov (Russian: Зуйков) is a Russian masculine surname, its feminine counterpart is Zuikova or Zuykova. It may refer to

- Sergei Zuykov (born 1993), Russian football defender
- Viktor Zuikov (born 1962), Estonian fencer
- Veronika Zuikova (born 1994), Estonian fencer
