= Gaia Caforio =

Italian fencer (born 2003)

Personal information
- Born: 8 October 2003 (age 22)

Fencing career
- Sport: Fencing
- Country: Italy
- Weapon: Épée
- Hand: Right-handed
Medal record
Women's épée
Representing Italy
World Championships
Gold medal – first place	2026 Hong Kong	Team

Gaia Caforio (born 8 October 2003) is an Italian right-handed épée fencer.

== Career ==
In April 2026, Caforio competed at the U23 European Championship and won a gold medal in the individual épée event. She then made her World Fencing Championships debut at the 2026 World Fencing Championships in July 2026. She competed in the individual épée event and lost to Tang Junyao in the round of 16. She then competed in the team épée event and won a gold medal.
