= Sailing at the 2026 Asian Games – Women's iQFoil =

Women's iQFoil at the 2026 Asian Games
- Venue: Kaiyoh Yacht Harbor
- Date: 1–2 October 2026
- Competitors: 7 from 7 nations

Medalists
gold medal	Li Wenqi	China
silver medal	Ma Kwan Ching	Hong Kong
bronze medal	Rina Niijima	Japan

The women's iQFoil competition at the 2026 Asian Games was held from 1–2 October 2026 at Kaiyoh Yacht Harbor in Gamagōri, Aichi, Japan.

Li Wenqi won the gold medal, Ma Kwan Ching took silver and Rina Niijima bronze.

== Schedule ==
All times are Japan Standard Time (UTC+09:00).

Date	Time	Event
Thursday, 1 October 2026	13:05	Race 1–5
Friday, 2 October 2026	10:05	Race 6–10

== Results ==
Legend

- DNS — Did not start

Rank	Athlete	Race										Total	Net
Rank	Athlete	1	2	3	4	5	6	7	8	9	10	Total	Net
1st place, gold medalist(s)	Li Wenqi (CHN)	1	1	1	1	1	1	1	1	1	~~(3)~~	12	9
2nd place, silver medalist(s)	Ma Kwan Ching (HKG)	2	2	2	~~(3)~~	2	2	2	2	2	1	20	17
3rd place, bronze medalist(s)	Rina Niijima (JPN)	4	~~(6)~~	3	4	3	3	3	3	3	2	34	28
4	Marsha Binte Shahrin (SGP)	~~(6)~~	5	4	5	6	4	4	4	5	4	47	41
5	Arrianne Paz (PHI)	3	4	5	~~(6)~~	5	5	6	5	4	5	48	42
6	Siripon Kaewduang-ngam (THA)	5	3	~~(6)~~	2	4	6	5	6	6	6	49	43
7	Katya Ida Coelho (IND)	7	7	7	7	7	7	7	7	~~(8)~~; DNS	8 DNS	72	64
