= Barbara Brych =

Polish fencer (born 2000)

Personal information
- Born: 4 December 2000 (age 25)

Fencing career
- Sport: Fencing
- Country: Poland
- Weapon: Épée
- Hand: Right-handed
Medal record
Women's épée
Representing Poland
World Championships
Bronze medal – third place	2026 Hong Kong	Individual

Barbara Brych (born 4 December 2000) is a Polish right-handed épée fencer.

== Career ==
Brych won the 2021 Polish Epee Championship. She competed at the 2021 Summer World University Games, which were postponed until August 2023 due to the COVID-19 pandemic.

In October 2025, she won the first Polish Cup women's épée title. The next month she repeated as champion in the second Polish Cup event of the season.

In July 2026, she competed at the 2026 World Fencing Championships. She defeated Hadley Husisian in the quarterfinals to advance to the semifinals. During the semifinals she lost to Giulia Rizzi and won a bronze medal.
