= Sailing at the 2026 Asian Games – Boys' ILCA 4 =

Boys' ILCA 4 at the 2026 Asian Games
- Venue: Kaiyoh Yacht Harbor
- Date: 29 September – 3 October 2026
- Competitors: 11 from 11 nations

Medalists
gold medal	Choi Ji-un	South Korea
silver medal	Ian Goh	Singapore
bronze medal	Tiago Cheng De Villemor Salgado	Hong Kong

The boys' ILCA 4 competition at the 2026 Asian Games was held from 29 September – 3 October 2026 at Kaiyoh Yacht Harbor in Gamagōri, Aichi, Japan.

Choi Ji-un won the gold medal, Ian Goh took silver and Tiago Cheng De Villemor Salgado bronze.

== Schedule ==
All times are Japan Standard Time (UTC+09:00).

Date	Time	Event
Tuesday, 29 September 2026	11:00	Race 1
Wednesday, 30 September 2026	11:10	Race 2–4
Thursday, 1 October 2026	13:00	Race 5–7
Friday, 2 October 2026	12:30	Race 8–10
Saturday, 3 October 2026	10:30	Race 11–12

== Results ==
Legend

- DSQ — Disqualification
- RET — Retired
- UFD — U flag disqualification

Rank	Athlete	Race												Total	Net
Rank	Athlete	1	2	3	4	5	6	7	8	9	10	11	12	Total	Net
1st place, gold medalist(s)	Choi Ji-un (KOR)	~~(6)~~	1	3	1	3	3	3	4	4	~~(5)~~	1	2	36	25
2nd place, silver medalist(s)	Ian Goh (SGP)	2	4	5	~~(6)~~	1	2	2	3	1	2	3	~~(6)~~	37	25
3rd place, bronze medalist(s)	Tiago Cheng De Villemor Salgado (HKG)	4	3	6	~~(9)~~	4	1	1	1	2	1	4	~~(7)~~	43	27
4	Ikuto Mori (JPN)	3	2	2	~~(8)~~	2	4	5	2	3	3	~~(6)~~	3	43	29
5	Hussaluk Srinakorn (THA)	1	5	4	5	~~(12)~~; UFD	5	4	~~(7)~~	5	4	2	4	58	39
6	Muhammad Aiman Aqeel Mohd Firdaus (MAS)	5	6	~~(9)~~	2	6	6	6	5	6	6	~~(9)~~	5	71	53
7	Abdullah Al-Zubaidi (UAE)	~~(12)~~; DSQ	~~(12)~~; RET	1	3	5	11	10	10	11	11	5	1	92	68
8	Mai Thanh Nhat (VIE)	7	~~(12)~~; RET	~~(12)~~; DSQ	4	8	8	9	9	7	10	7	8	101	77
9	Thani Shams (QAT)	9	9	8	7	7	7	7	~~(11)~~	8	7	~~(10)~~	10	100	79
10	Daniil Kalashnikov (UZB)	8	7	10	~~(11)~~	~~(12)~~; UFD	9	8	6	9	8	8	11	107	84
11	Ilya Ivanov (KAZ)	10	8	7	10	9	10	~~(11)~~	8	10	9	~~(11)~~	9	112	90
