= Sailing at the 2026 Asian Games – Boys' iQFoil =

Boys' iQFoil at the 2026 Asian Games
- Venue: Kaiyoh Yacht Harbor
- Date: 1–3 October 2026
- Competitors: 6 from 6 nations

Medalists
| gold medal | Wong Tsz Ho | Hong Kong |
| silver medal | Masato Kozono | Japan |
| bronze medal | Wong John Tze Xiang | Singapore |

The boys' iQFoil competition at the 2026 Asian Games was held from 1–3 October 2026 at Kaiyoh Yacht Harbor in Gamagōri, Aichi, Japan.

Wong Tsz Ho won the gold medal, Masato Kozono took silver and Wong John Tze Xiang bronze.

== Schedule ==
All times are Japan Standard Time (UTC+09:00).

| Date | Time | Event |
|---|---|---|
| Thursday, 1 October 2026 | 10:00 | Race 1–5 |
| Friday, 2 October 2026 | 13:00 | Race 6–10 |
| Saturday, 3 October 2026 | 10:05 | Race 11 |

== Results ==
Legend

- BFD — Black flag disqualification
- DSQ — Disqualification
- RET — Retired

| Rank | Athlete | Race | | | | | | | | | | | Total | Net |
| Rank | Athlete | 1 | 2 | 3 | 4 | 5 | 6 | 7 | 8 | 9 | 10 | 11 | Total | Net |
|---|---|---|---|---|---|---|---|---|---|---|---|---|---|---|
| 1st place, gold medalist(s) | Wong Tsz Ho (HKG) | 1 | ~~(5)~~ | 1 | ~~(3)~~ | 1 | 2 | 1 | 1 | 3 | 1 | 2 | 21 | 13 |
| 2nd place, silver medalist(s) | Masato Kozono (JPN) | ~~(6)~~ | ~~(4)~~ | 3 | 1 | 4 | 1 | 3 | 2 | 1 | 2 | 1 | 28 | 18 |
| 3rd place, bronze medalist(s) | Wong John Tze Xiang (SGP) | 3 | 2 | 2 | ~~(4)~~ | 2 | ~~(5)~~ | 2 | 3 | 4 | 3 | 4 | 34 | 25 |
| 4 | Dhenver John Castillo (PHI) | 2 | ~~(7)~~; RET | 4 | 5 | ~~(6)~~ | 3 | 6 | 4 | 2 | 5 | 3 | 47 | 34 |
| 5 | Lee Hye-in (KOR) | ~~(5)~~ | 1 | 5 | 2 | 5 | ~~(6)~~ | 4 | 5 | 5 | 4 | 5 | 47 | 36 |
| 6 | Wachirawit Thonup (THA) | 4 | 3 | 6 | ~~(7)~~; DSQ | 3 | 4 | 5 | 6 | 6 | 6 | ~~(7)~~; BFD | 57 | 43 |
