= Women's team épée at the 2026 World Fencing Championships =

- Venue: AsiaWorld–Expo
- Location: Hong Kong
- Dates: 28 July
- Competitors: 139 from 36 nations
- Teams: 36

Medalists
gold medal	Gaia Caforio; Rossella Fiamingo; Giulia Rizzi; Alberta Santuccio	Italy
silver medal	Irina Embrich; Julia Beljajeva; Katrina Lehis; Veronika Zuikova	Estonia
bronze medal	Yang Seung-hye; Lee Hye-in; Lim Tae-hee; Song Se-ra	South Korea

The Women's team épée competition at the 2026 World Fencing Championships was held on 28 July 2026.

== Draw ==
=== Finals ===
Semifinals
South Korea	44
Italy	45
Hungary	34
Estonia	42

Final
Italy	31
Estonia	30
Third place
South Korea	45
Hungary	40

=== Top half ===
==== Section 1 ====
Round of 64
Mexico	45
United Arab Emirates	37

Round of 32
South Korea	45
Mexico	22
Kazakhstan	39
Sweden	38
Ukraine	45
Finland	28
India	30
China	45

Round of 16
South Korea	45
Kazakhstan	39
Ukraine	45
China	36

Quarterfinals
South Korea	44
Ukraine	38

==== Section 2 ====
Round of 64
Great Britain	45
New Zealand	32

Round of 32
Italy	40
Australia	14
Singapore	41
Switzerland	45
Hong Kong	31
Egypt	28
Great Britain	31
Russia	45

Round of 16
Italy	29
Switzerland	27
Hong Kong	45
Russia	40

Quarterfinals
Italy	45
Hong Kong	24

=== Bottom half ===
==== Section 3 ====
Round of 64
Thailand	32
Algeria	45

Round of 32
United States	45
Algeria	21
Spain	26
Germany	39
Poland	45
Uzbekistan	26
Colombia	30
Hungary	45

Round of 16
United States	45
Germany	20
Poland	26
Hungary	38

Quarterfinals
United States	37
Hungary	42

==== Section 4 ====
Round of 64
Chinese Taipei	42
Philippines	41

Round of 32
Estonia	36
Romania	25
Venezuela	19
Canada	34
Israel	45
Japan	40
Chinese Taipei	18
France	45

Round of 16
Estonia	45
Canada	25
Israel	39
France	45

Quarterfinals
Estonia	45
France	34

=== Placement rounds ===
==== 5–8th place bracket ====
5–8th place semifinals
Ukraine	45
Hong Kong	44
United States	32
France	43

Fifth place
Ukraine	30
France	31
Seventh place
Hong Kong	31
United States	45

==== 9–16th place bracket ====
9–16th place quarterfinals
Kazakhstan	42
China	45
Switzerland	43
Russia	44
Germany	32
Poland	36
Canada	45
Israel	35

9–12th place semifinals
China	27
Russia	35
Poland	26
Canada	27

Ninth place
Russia	40
Canada	30
Eleventh place
China	35
Poland	45

==== 13–16th place bracket ====
13–16th place semifinals
Kazakhstan	26
Switzerland	38
Germany	45
Israel	36

13th place
Switzerland	29
Germany	28
15th place
Kazakhstan	45
Israel	36

== Final ranking ==
Rank	Team
1st place, gold medalist(s)	Italy
2nd place, silver medalist(s)	Estonia
3rd place, bronze medalist(s)	South Korea
4	Hungary
5	France
6	Ukraine
7	United States
8	Hong Kong
9	Russia
10	Canada
11	Poland
12	China
13	Switzerland
14	Germany
15	Kazakhstan
16	Israel
17	Sweden
18	Japan
19	Spain
20	Egypt
21	Singapore
22	Uzbekistan
23	Venezuela
24	Finland
25	India
26	Romania
27	Colombia
28	Australia
29	Great Britain
30	Algeria
31	Chinese Taipei
32	Mexico
33	United Arab Emirates
34	Philippines
35	Thailand
36	New Zealand
