= Sailing at the 2018 Asian Games – Mixed RS:One =

Mixed RS:One at the 2018 Asian Games
- Venue: Ancol Beach Marina
- Date: 24–31 August 2018
- Competitors: 16 from 8 nations

Medalists
gold medal	Chen Hao; Tan Yue	China
silver medal	Rafeek Kikabhoy; Ma Kwan Ching	Hong Kong
bronze medal	Ilham Wahab; Nur Fatin Solehah	Malaysia

The mixed under-22 team RS:One competition at the 2018 Asian Games was held from 24 to 31 August 2018. Each team was consisted of one male sailor and one female sailor, the individual man's and woman's score was added together to give the overall Mixed Team's score for that event.

== Schedule ==
All times are Western Indonesia Time (UTC+07:00)

Date	Time	Event
Friday, 24 August 2018	14:15	Race 1
Friday, 24 August 2018	15:00	Race 2
Saturday, 25 August 2018	12:15	Race 3
Saturday, 25 August 2018	13:20	Race 4
Saturday, 25 August 2018	13:40	Race 5
Sunday, 26 August 2018	12:19	Race 6
Sunday, 26 August 2018	15:45	Race 7
Sunday, 26 August 2018	16:55	Race 8
Monday, 27 August 2018	12:10	Race 9
Monday, 27 August 2018	12:55	Race 10
Tuesday, 28 August 2018	13:40	Race 11
Wednesday, 29 August 2018	12:10	Race 12
Wednesday, 29 August 2018	12:55	Race 13
Wednesday, 29 August 2018	13:40	Race 14
Friday, 31 August 2018	14:10	Race 15

== Results ==
Legend

- DNC — Did not come to the starting area
- DSQ — Disqualification
- UFD — U flag disqualification

Rank	Team	Race															Total
Rank	Team	1	2	3	4	5	6	7	8	9	10	11	12	13	14	15	Total
1st place, gold medalist(s)	China (CHN)	2	3	~~(6)~~	3	3	3	2	4	2	2	2	3	3	2	2	36
	Chen Hao	1	1	5	2	2	2	1	2	1	1	1	2	2	1	1	
	Tan Yue	1	2	1	1	1	1	1	2	1	1	1	1	1	1	1	
2nd place, silver medalist(s)	Hong Kong (HKG)	4	5	3	3	3	3	4	2	4	4	6	~~(7)~~	6	7	5	59
	Rafeek Kikabhoy	2	4	1	1	1	1	2	1	2	2	4	5	4	4	3	
	Ma Kwan Ching	2	1	2	2	2	2	2	1	2	2	2	2	2	3	2	
3rd place, bronze medalist(s)	Malaysia (MAS)	6	6	7	~~(10)~~	7	8	10	10	6	6	6	6	8	10	7	103
	Ilham Wahab	3	3	4	4	4	5	5	5	3	3	2	1	5	5	4	
	Nur Fatin Solehah	3	3	3	6	3	3	5	5	3	3	4	5	3	5	3	
4	Indonesia (INA)	9	9	8	10	11	8	~~(18)~~	6	8	10	8	7	7	5	11	117
	Ridwan Ramadan	4	2	2	6	7	4	9 UFD	3	4	5	5	4	1	3	5	
	Nenni Marlini	5	7	6	4	4	4	9 UFD	3	4	5	3	3	6	2	6	
5	Thailand (THA)	11	9	7	10	10	11	~~(12)~~	8	10	12	8	7	7	6	10	126
	Bunyarit Sangngern	7	5	3	7	5	6	6	4	5	6	3	3	3	2	6	
	Cholchaya Junthonglang	4	4	4	3	5	5	6	4	5	6	5	4	4	4	4	
6	South Korea (KOR)	~~(16)~~	15	13	10	10	10	6	12	16	16	13	14	12	13	9	169
	Seo Young-kil	9 DSQ	9 DNC	6	3	3	3	3	6	8	8	6	8	7	7	2	
	Kim Sae-bom	7	6	7	7	7	7	3	6	8	8	7	6	5	6	7	
7	Singapore (SGP)	12	12	12	13	~~(14)~~	14	8	14	14	14	14	14	13	13	12	179
	Reynold Chan	6	7	7	8	8	8	4	7	7	7	8	7	6	6	7	
	Ynez Lim	6	5	5	5	6	6	4	7	7	7	6	7	7	7	5	
8	India (IND)	13	14	16	13	15	16	~~(18)~~	18	12	8	15	15	18	18	18	209
	Dayne Edgar Agnelo	5	6	8	5	6	7	9 DNC	9 DNC	6	4	7	6	9 DNC	9 DNC	9 DNC	
	Katya Coelho	8	8	8	8	9 DNC	9 DNC	9 DNC	9 DNC	6	4	8	9 DNC	9 DNC	9 DNC	9 DNC	
