= Sailing at the 2026 Asian Games – Boys' 29er =

Boys' 29er at the 2026 Asian Games
- Venue: Kaiyoh Yacht Harbor
- Date: 26 September – 2 October 2026
- Competitors: 12 from 6 nations

Medalists
gold medal	Ethan Kiu; Louis Polson	Hong Kong
silver medal	Sean Kum; Nigel Tan	Singapore
bronze medal	Muhammad Adam Aierell; Iqbal Nazham Musmuliadi	Malaysia

The boys' 29er competition at the 2026 Asian Games was held from 26 September – 2 October 2026 at Kaiyoh Yacht Harbor in Gamagōri, Aichi, Japan.

Ethan Kiu and Louis Polson won the gold medal, Sean Kum and Nigel Tan took silver and Muhammad Adam Aierell and Iqbal Nazham Musmuliadi bronze.

== Schedule ==
All times are Japan Standard Time (UTC+09:00).

Date	Time	Event
Saturday, 26 September 2026	11:00	Race 1–2
Wednesday, 30 September 2026	14:00	Race 3–4
Thursday, 1 October 2026	13:00	Race 5–8
Friday, 2 October 2026	10:00	Race 9–12

== Results ==
Legend

- DNF — Did not finish
- UFD — U flag disqualification

Rank	Team	Race												Total	Net
Rank	Team	1	2	3	4	5	6	7	8	9	10	11	12	Total	Net
1st place, gold medalist(s)	Hong Kong (HKG); Ethan Kiu; Louis Polson	~~(1)~~	~~(1)~~	1	1	1	1	1	1	1	1	1	1	12	10
2nd place, silver medalist(s)	Singapore (SGP); Sean Kum; Nigel Tan	~~(6)~~	~~(5)~~	4	5	2	4	3	2	3	2	2	3	41	30
3rd place, bronze medalist(s)	Malaysia (MAS); Muhammad Adam Aierell; Iqbal Nazham Musmuliadi	2	~~(6)~~	3	2	4	5	2	4	~~(6)~~	4	3	4	45	33
4	Oman (OMA); Tamim Al Balushi; Firas Al Nabhani	4	3	2	4	3	~~(6)~~	4	3	2	~~(6)~~	4	5	46	34
5	Japan (JPN); Haruto Goto; Koh Nagahori	5	2	5	3	~~(7)~~; UFD	3	~~(6)~~	5	4	3	5	2	50	37
6	Thailand (THA); Sarawut Panphiboon; Panudat Polpool	3	4	6	6	5	2	5	6	5	5	~~(7)~~; DNF	~~(7)~~; DNF	61	47
