= Katya Coelho =

Indian windsurfer (born 1999)

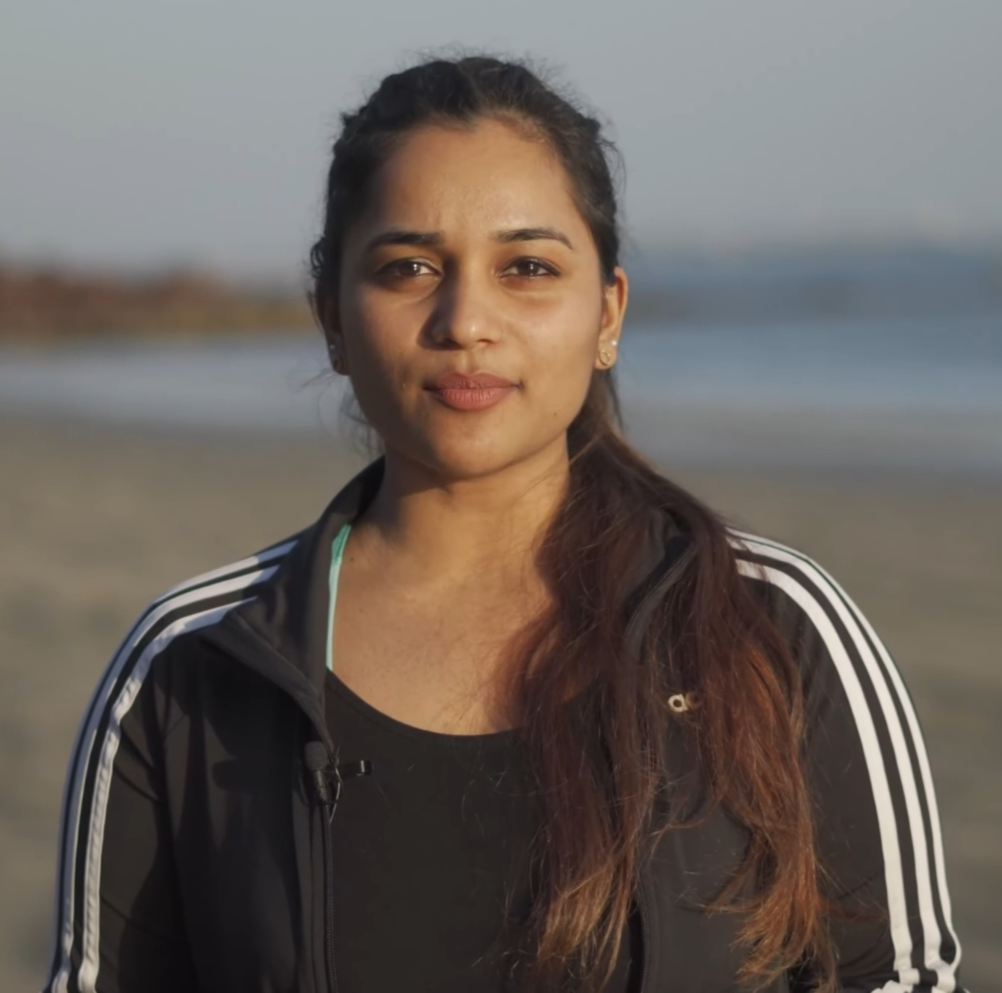
- Coelho in 2022

Personal information
- Born: Katya Ida Coelho; 13 August 1999 (age 27) Goa, India
Medal record
Women's windsurfing
Representing India
Event	1st	2nd	3rd
Asian Championship	0	0	2
International Windsurfing Cup	0	1	0

Katya Ida Coelho (born 13 August 1999) is an Indian windsurfer. She was the first Indian to win a medal in IQFoil in an international competition.

== Early and personal life ==
Katya Ida Coelho was born on 13 August 1999 in Goa, India. Her father Donald Coelho is a former national windsurfing champion of India, and coaches Katya and her brother Dayne, who is also a windsurfer.

== Career ==
Katya started windsurfing at the age of 11, and went on to compete in the 2014 Summer Youth Olympics at the age of 14. She won two bronze medals in the 2015 Asian Windsurfing Championships in Enoshima, Japan.

Katya and her brother were part of the Indian team for the 2018 Asian Games after qualifying in the trials held by the Yachting Association of India in April 2018 in Chennai. In the Asian Games at Jakarta, they competed in the mixed RS:One event. In July 2022, she became the first Indian to win an international medal in the IQFoil category after she secured second place at the International Windsurfing Cup in Pattaya, Thailand. She was part of the Indian contingent at the 2026 Asian Games.
