= Gyeonggi Provincial Office of Education =

Office of education in South Korea

District information
- Grades: Pre-K through 12
- Established: 1956

The Gyeonggi Provincial Office of Education is the office of education for Gyeonggi Province, South Korea. The current superintendent is Yim Tae-hee. It was established in 1956.

== Superintendent ==
The current superintendent is Yim Tae-hee. He took office in 2022 July.

== Private School Purchase Programs ==
The department had a program where private schools in financial distress are bought by the department, with the schools becoming public after changes in administration. The department bought 9 such kindergartens in August 2019, to open in March 2020.
