= Singapore at the 2026 Asian Games =

- IOC code: SGP
- NOC: Singapore National Olympic Council

in Aichi–Nagoya, Japan September 19 – October 4, 2026
- Competitors: 304 in 31 sports
- Flag bearers: Kiria Tikanah and Brandon Ooi
- Medals Ranked 21st: Gold 2 Silver 9 Bronze 7 Total 18

Asian Games appearances (overview)
- 1951; 1954; 1958; 1962; 1966; 1970; 1974; 1978; 1982; 1986; 1990; 1994; 1998; 2002; 2006; 2010; 2014; 2018; 2022; 2026

Singapore competed at the 2026 Asian Games in Aichi Prefecture and Nagoya, Japan from September 19 to October 4, 2026. The country participated in 27 sports with a cohort of 304 athletes.

== Medal summary ==
Medal	Name	Sport	Event	Date
Gold	Tiffany Teo	Mixed Martial Arts	Women's Traditional 60kg	22 September
Gold	Shanti Pereira	Athletics	Women's 200 metres	27 September
Silver	Gan Ching Hwee	Swimming	Women's 1500 m freestyle	20 September
Silver	Gan Ching Hwee	Swimming	Women's 400 m freestyle	22 September
Silver	Kiria Tikanah	Fencing	Women's individual Épée	22 September
Silver	Gan Ching Hwee	Swimming	Women's 800 m Freestyle	24 September
Silver	Shanti Pereira	Athletics	Women's 100 metres	25 September
Silver	Loh Kean Yew	Badminton	Men's Singles	29 September
Silver	Sean Kum; Nigel Tan	Sailing	Boys' 29er	2 October
Silver	Jania Ang	Sailing	Women's ILCA 6	2 October
Silver	Ian Goh	Sailing	Boys' ILCA 4	3 October
Bronze	Zeanne Law	Wushu	Women's taijiquan & taijijian	20 September
Bronze	Maxine Wong	Fencing	Women's Individual Foil	23 September
Bronze	Kiria Tikanah; Elle Koh; Esther Tan; Filzah Hidaya	Fencing	Women's Team Foil	25 September
Bronze	Darren Yap	Taekwondo	Men's individual	1 October
Bronze	Darren Yap	Taekwondo	Virtual Mixed Individual	2 October
Bronze	Shannon Tan	Golf	Women's Individual	3 October
Bronze	John Wong	Sailing	Boys' iQFoil	3 October

Medals by sport
Sport	1st place, gold medalist(s)	2nd place, silver medalist(s)	3rd place, bronze medalist(s)	Total
Atheletics	1	1	0	2
Badminton	0	1	0	1
Fencing	0	1	2	3
Golf	0	0	1	1
Mixed Martial Arts	1	0	0	1
Sailing	0	3	1	4
Swimming	0	3	0	3
Taekwondo	0	0	2	2
Wushu	0	0	1	1
Total	2	9	7	18

Medals by gender
Gender	1st place, gold medalist(s)	2nd place, silver medalist(s)	3rd place, bronze medalist(s)	Total
Male	0	3	3	6
Female	2	6	4	12
Total	2	9	7	18

Medals by date
Date	1st place, gold medalist(s)	2nd place, silver medalist(s)	3rd place, bronze medalist(s)	Total
20 September	0	1	1	2
22 September	1	2	0	3
23 September	0	0	1	1
24 September	0	1	0	1
25 September	0	1	1	2
27 September	1	0	0	1
29 September	0	1	0	1
1 October	0	0	1	1
2 October	0	2	1	3
3 October	0	1	2	3
Total	2	9	7	18

== Competitors ==
The following is a list of the number of competitors representing Singapore that will participate at the Asian Games:

Sport	Men	Women	Total
3x3 basketball	4	4	8
Archery	0	2	2
Artistic swimming	0	2	2
Athletics	15	8	23
Badminton	3	1	4
Canoeing	5	5	10
Cycling	0	4	4
Diving	2	4	6
Esports	8	0	8
Fencing	8	12	20
Field hockey	0	20	20
Golf	3	3	6
Gymnastics	5	12	17
Ju-jitsu	4	5	9
Karate	1	2	3
Kurash	1	0	1
Mixed Martial Arts	1	0	1
Modern pentathlon	1	0	1
Rugby sevens	13	13	26
Sailing	6	5	11
Sepak takraw	6	0	6
Shooting	1	2	3
Softball	0	17	17
Sport climbing	4	5	9
Squash	1	4	5
Surfing	0	1	1
Swimming	15	14	29
Table tennis	5	5	10
Taewondo	1	1	2
Triathlon	2	3	5
Water polo	15	15	30
Wushu	4	3	7
Total	133	171	304

== 3X3 basketball ==
Singapore men's and women's teams will debut at the games through the qualifier events.

Athlete	Event	Group Stage				Qualifications	Quarterfinal	Semifinal	Final / BM	
Athlete	Event	Opposition Score	Opposition Score	Opposition Score	Rank	Opposition Score	Opposition Score	Opposition Score	Opposition Score	Rank
Liam Blakney; Ching Zhen Yu; Michael Kesevan-Kankam; Muhamed Faizal; Muhamed Zahid	Men's tournament	Japan; L 17–21	Thailand; W 21–10	South Korea; L 14–19	3 Q	Mongolia; L 16–20	Did not advance			9
Cassandra Tay; Denise Choo; Matilda Lai; Lim Lek Ker	Women's tournament	Indonesia; W 21–13	Thailand	South Korea; L 13–21	3 Q	Kazakhstan; W 14–11	Philippines; L 12–22	Did not advance		8

== Archery ==
Two archers qualified for the games.

Archer	Event	Ranking Round		Round of 64	Round of 32	Round of 16	Quarterfinals	Semi-finals	Final / BM	
Archer	Event	Score	Seed	Opposition Score	Opposition Score	Opposition Score	Opposition Score	Opposition Score	Opposition Score	Rank
Elle Low	Women's Compound Individual	690	29	Bye	Lyan V (KAZ); L 143–144	Did not advance				
Madeline Ong	Women's Compound Individual	689	31	Bye	Ashrifah (INA); W 21–14, 21–19	Did not advance				

== Artistic Swimming ==
Two athletes will represent the country.

Athlete	Event	Technical routine		Free routine		Overall	
Athlete	Event	Points	Rank	Points	Rank	Total	Rank
Debbie Soh; Yvette Chong	Women's duet						

== Athletics ==
A total of 23 athletes (15 men and 8 women) will represent the country across all events.

Track Events

Athlete	Event	Heat		Semi-finals		Final	
Athlete	Event	Result	Rank	Result	Rank	Result	Rank
Ang Chen Xiang	Men's 110 m Hurdles	13.88	9 Q	-		13.90	7
Marc Brian Louis	Men's 100 m	10.33	11 Q	10.37	16	Did not advance	
Thiruben	Men's 800 m	1:55.76	19	Did not advance			
Elizabeth-Ann Tan	Women's 100 m	11.79	13 Q	11.72	12	Did not advance	
Elizabeth-Ann Tan	Women's 200 m	24.11	16 Q	Did not advance			
Shanti Pereira	Women's 100m	11.43	2 Q	11.29	1 Q	11.21	2nd place, silver medalist(s)
Shanti Pereira	Women's 200 m	23.10	1 Q	-		22.78	1st place, gold medalist(s)
Vanessa Lee	Women's 10000 m	-				36:00.95	10 NR
Nicole Low	Women's 10000 m	-				36:47.31	12

Relay Events

Athlete	Event	Heat		Semi-finals		Final	
Athlete	Event	Result	Rank	Result	Rank	Result	Rank
Ian Gan Xander Ho Mark Lee Tate Tan Fung	Men's 4 × 100 m	39.34	8 Q	-		39.88	8
Elizabeth-Ann Tan Amanda Loo Kerstin Ong Shanti Pereira	Women's 4 × 100 m	45.12	9	Did not advance			
Tate Tan Fung Elizabeth-Ann Tan Mark Lee Shanti Pereira	Mixed 4 × 100 m		4	-		41.66	4 NR

Field Events

Athlete	Event	Final	
Athlete	Event	Result	Rank
Gabriel Lee	Men's Triple Jump	15.71	9
Kampton Kam	Men's High Jump	210	6
Tia Louise	Women's Long Jump	12.95	15
Tia Louise	Women's Triple Jump	12.95	11

== Badminton ==
Singapore sent four players to represent the country in the games.

Athlete	Event	Round of 64	Round of 32	Round of 16	Quarterfinals	Semi-finals	Final	
Athlete	Event	Opposition Score	Opposition Score	Opposition Score	Opposition Score	Opposition Score	Opposition Score	Rank
Loh Kean Yew	Men's Singles	Bye	L Sen (IND); W 21–12, 15–21, 21–14	J Hoh (MAS); W 21–14, 21–14	J Christie (INA); W 21–14, 21–19	Yoo T B (KOR); W 21–19, 19–21, 21–14	K Vitidsarn (THA); L 12–21, 16–21	2nd place, silver medalist(s)
Yeo Jia Min	Women's Singles	Bye	Thapa / Shrestha (MDV); W 21–9, 21–13	R Itanon (THA); L 12–21, 16–21	Did not advance			17
Junsuke Kubo; Wesley Koh	Men's Doubles	Bye	Thapa / Shrestha (NEP); W 21–13, 21–16	Kang / Ki (KOR); L 14–21, 12–21	Did not advance			17

== Canoeing ==
Ten athletes will represent the country across all events.

=== Sprint ===
Athlete	Event	Heats		Semi-finals		Final	
Athlete	Event	Time	Rank	Time	Rank	Time	Rank
Tristan Loo	Men's K-1 500 m	1:49.847	4 QS	1:48.630	2 QF	1:52.570	7
Alden Ler Brandon Ooi	Men's K-2 500 m	2:05.709	6 QS	1:38.409	2 QF	1:37.514	6
Alden Ler Brandon Ooi Oliver Bowhay Sean Teo	Men's K-4 500 m	1:29.944	4 QS	1:31.952	2 QF	1:28.298	6
Stephanie Chen	Women's K-1 500 m	-				2:00.617	4
Georgia Ng Grace Ng	Women's C-2 500 m	1:59.237	4 QS	1:57.722	3 QF	1:57.834	7
Kirsten Yu Lim Kai Jing Georgia Ng Grace Ng	Women's K-4 500 m	-				1:44.294	4

Qualification legend: QS = Semi-final; QF = Final

== Cycling ==
Two athletes are having their debut for the games.

=== Madison ===
Athlete	Event	Sprint												Laps		Total	Finish order
Athlete	Event	1	2	3	4	5	6	7	8	9	10	11	12	+	−	Total	Finish order
Elizabeth Liau Velencia Tan	Women's Madison							1							20	–19	5

=== Road Race ===
Athlete	Event	Final	
Athlete	Event	Time	Rank
Elizabeth Liau	Women's road race	2:56:53	22

=== Omnium ===
Athlete	Event	Scratch race		Tempo race		Elimination race		Points race		Total points	Rank
Athlete	Event	Rank	Points	Rank	Points	Rank	Points	Rank	Points	Total points	Rank
Valencia Tan	Women's omnium		28	9	26	8	26	7	5	81	8

== Diving ==
Six athletes will represent the country across all events (2 men and 4 women).

Athlete	Event	Preliminary		Final	
Athlete	Event	Score	Rank	Score	Rank
Max Lee	Men's 1m springboard	297.4	7	Did not advance	
Max Lee	Men's 3m springboard	351.20	7 Q	355.80	8
Aislee Kwang	Women's 10 m Platform	229.60	9 Q	249.3	9
Ryenne Cham	Women's 10 m Platform	188.20	11 Q	232.25	10
Alexandra Yeo Sophia Tan	Women's Synchronized 3m springboard	203.31	6		
Ainslee Kwang Ryenne Cham	Women's Synchronised 10 m Platform	207.18	7		

== Esports ==
=== Gran Turismo 7 ===
Athlete	Event	Qualification	Semi-final	Rank	Final	Rank
Athlete	Event	Opposition Score	Opposition Score	Rank	Opposition Score	Rank
Ar Muhammad Aleef S/O Mohamed Rafik	Gran Turismo 7	2:13.210	20:40.498	3 Q	15	6

Gamer	Event	Group stage				Rank	Round of 16	Quarter-final	Semi-final	Final	Rank
Gamer	Event	Opposition Score	Opposition Score	Opposition Score	Opposition Score	Rank	Opposition Score	Opposition Score	Opposition Score	Opposition Score	Rank
Justin Koh	Puyo Puyo Champions	Paritosh (IND) -	Wongkitikun (THA) -	KUO (TPE) -	Ganbold (MGL) -		Pivovarov (KAZ) W 5–4	Yuki (JPN) L 0–5	Did not advance		
Bryan Khoo; Chuang Fu Yuan; Fong Travis; Lim Freddy; Tay Leong Jie; Wayne Chua	Pokémon Unite	Hong Kong W 2–0	Indonesia L 1–2	South Korea L 1–2	Did not advance						

== Fencing ==
Singapore sent 20 athletes to represent the country (8 men and 12 women).

Men's

Athlete	Event	Round of Pool		Round of 64	Round of 32	Round of 16	Quarterfinals	Semifinals	Final	
Athlete	Event	Result	Rank	Opposition Score	Opposition Score	Opposition Score	Opposition Score	Opposition Score	Opposition Score	Rank
Simon Lee	Individual épée		22 Q	Ng (HKG); L 11–14	Did not advance					
Si To Jian Tong	Individual épée		9 Q	Tirurov (UZB); W 15–13	Jang (KOR); L 12–15	Did not advance				
Raphael Tan	Individual Foil	Sanasam (IND); W 5–2; Cheong (MAC); W 5–4; Al Shuaibi (OMA); W 5–3; Tranquilan (PHI); W 5–1; Imura (JPN); L 1–5	Q	Bye	Semeneev (UZB); L 11–15	Did not advance				
Samuel Robson	Individual Foil	Aljaallaf (UAE); W 5–1; Chen (TPE); W 4–5; Arjoni (INA); W 5–2; Perez (PHI); W 5–1; Choi (HKG); L 5–3	Q	Bye	Mohammad (KUW); W 15–5	Wangpaisit (THA); W 15–9	Choi (HKG); L 5–3	Did not advance		
Si To Jian Tong Simon Lee Azfar Ong Cher Puah Zee	Team épée	-				Philippines (PHI); W 45–30	Kazakhstan (KAZ); L 36–45	Did not advance		
Raphael Tan; Samuel Robson; Keyon Loo; Zephaniah Kiew	Team Foil	-				Oman (OMA); W 45–19	China (CHN); L 27–45	Did not advance		

Women's

Athlete	Event	Round of Pool		Round of 64	Round of 32	Round of 16	Quarterfinals	Semifinals	Final	
Athlete	Event	Result	Rank	Opposition Score	Opposition Score	Opposition Score	Opposition Score	Opposition Score	Opposition Score	Rank
Elle Koh	Individual épée	Chaudhari (IND); W 5–2; Tang (CHN); W 4–3; Nguyen (VIE); W 5–4; Khakimova (UZB); W 5–4; Larrazabal (PHI); W 5–3	1 Q	Bye	Bye	Gomez (PHI); W 3-1 (Retired)	Terayama (JPN); L 11–15	Did not advance		
Kiria Tikanah	Individual épée	Alrefae (KUW); W 5–4; Yoshimura (JPN); W 5–4; Hsieh (HKG); W 5–4; Thiankul (THA); W 5–1; Al Dighaishi (OMA); W 5–2	Q	Bye	Bye	Yoshimura (JPN); W 14–13	Bakaldina (KAZ); W 15–14	Yang (CHN); W 15–14	Song (KOR); L 8–15	2nd place, silver medalist(s)
Amita Berthier	Individual Foil	Huang (CHN); L 0–5 Ku (MAC); W 5–3; Joys (IND); W 5–3; Israa (OMA); W 5–2; Kikuchi (JPN); W 5–3	9 Q	Bye	Volobueva (UZB); L 14–15	Did not advance				
Maxine Wong	Individual Foil	link=|alt=|border|22x22px] Lam (MAC) W 5–4 Chan (HKG) L 2–5 Aktayeva (KAZ) L 3–5 Btaddini (QAT) W 5–0 Mo (KOR) L 4–5	14 Q	Bye	Catantan (PHI); W 15–2	Huang (CHN); W 12–10	Chan (HKG); W 15–6	Ueka (JPN); W 6–15	Did not advance	3rd place, bronze medalist(s)
Jae Lim	Individual sabre	link=|alt=|border|22x22px] Gulik (KAZ) W 5–3 Perdebaeva (UZB) L 3–5 Leung (HKG) L 2–5 Tugsjargal (MGL) L 1–5 Rao (CHN) L 3–5	23	Did not advance						
Juliet Heng	Individual sabre	link=|alt=|border|22x22px] Dalmacio (PHI) W 5–4 Gupta (IND) L 4–5 Emura (JPN) L 3–5 Pan (CHN) L 3–5 Anggraini (INA) W 5–1	13 Q	Jylyn (PHI); W 15–10	Pan (CHN); L 9–15	Did not advance				
Amita Berthier Maxine Wong Cheung Kemei Stephanie Lee	Team épée	-					Hong Kong (HKG); L 35–45	Did not advance		
Kiria Tikanah; Elle Koh; Esther Tan; Filzah Hidaya	Team foil	-					Uzbekistan (UZB); W 42–41	South Korea (KOR); L 35–45	Did not advance	3rd place, bronze medalist(s)
Juliet Heng Jae Lim Christine Tan Thhivya Ashti Siva Kumar	Team sabre	-				Philippines (PHI); W 45–23	China (CHN); L 32–45	Did not advance		

== Field hockey ==
Summary

Key:

- s.o. – Match decided by penalty-shootout.

Team	Event	Group Stage						Semi-final	Pl	
Team	Event	Opposition Result	Opposition Result	Opposition Result	Opposition Result	Opposition Result	Rank	Opposition Result	Opposition Result	Rank
Women's team	Women's tournament	Thailand; L 0–2	Japan; L 0–5	Indonesia; L 1–3	Uzbekistan; W 3–1	India; L 0–7	5	Did not advance	Bangladesh; D 1–1 (1–2 s.o.)	10

Women's tournament

Team squads

The following is the Singapore roster in the women's field hockey tournament of the 2026 Asian Games.

Head Coach: (Singapore) Henry Wong

1. Taylor Liu (GK)
4. Ally Zuraiddy
5. Jolene Ng
6. Tiffany Ong
7. Xiao Qian Kwek
8. Phylicia Tanandika
9. Nadiah Kie Hwee Ong
11. Puay Ho
12. Chloe Loh
14. Li Min Toh
15. Dayana Ong
17. Cheryll Chia
18. Felissa Lai (GK)
20. Sardonna Ng (C)
21. Wei Lin Chan
22. Valerie Tay
23. Elliea Rizal
24. Ivy Chan
28. Cindy Ong
77. Valerie Sim (C)

Preliminary round

Pos	Team	Pld	W	D	L	GF	GA	GD	Pts	Qualification
1	India	5	5	0	0	66	3	+63	15	Semi-finals
2	Japan (H)	5	4	0	1	23	4	+19	12	Semi-finals
3	Thailand	5	2	0	3	6	25	−19	6	Fifth place classification
4	Indonesia	5	2	0	3	6	27	−21	6	Fifth place classification
5	Singapore	5	1	0	4	4	18	−14	3	Ninth place game
6	Uzbekistan	5	1	0	4	5	33	−28	3	Eleventh place game

Source: FIH
Rules for classification: 1) points; 2) matches won; 3) goal difference; 4) goals for; 5) head-to-head result; 6) field goals for.
(H) Hosts

18 September 2026
15:00

Thailand	2–0	Singapore
Komolwit 50'; Inpa 57'	Report

Gifu Prefectural Green Stadium
Umpires:
Yu Tian (CHN)
Emi Yamada (JPN)

21 September 2026
17:00

Japan	5–0	Singapore
Murayama 23'; Toriyama 28'; Kobayakawa 29'; Hasegawa 38'; Saito 44'	Report

Gifu Prefectural Green Stadium
Umpires:
Liu Yu-Chen (TPE)
Liu Xiaoying (CHN)

23 September 2026
11:00

Singapore	1–3	Indonesia
S. Ng 35'	Report	Lispa 26'; Maulani 29'; Naiborhu 54'

Gifu Prefectural Green Stadium
Umpires:
Laurine Delforge (BEL)
Binish Hayat (PAK)

25 September 2026
17:00

Singapore	3–1	Uzbekistan
Sim 39'; Chia 47'; J. Ng 48'	Report	Yubko 37'

Gifu Prefectural Green Stadium
Umpires:
Rinky See (HKG)
Binish Hayat (PAK)

27 September 2026
19:00

India	7–0	Singapore
Tete 17'; Toppo 22', 24'; Lalremsiami 26'; Pisal 29'; Pradhan 35'; Deepika 55'	Report

Gifu Prefectural Green Stadium
Umpires:
Laurine Delforge (BEL)
Zarina Ilyassova (KAZ)

Ninth place match

2 October 2026
09:00

Bangladesh	1–1	Singapore
Riya 10'	Report; SO Report	Toh 44'
Penalties
Khatun (penalty shoot-out missed); Riya (penalty shoot-out missed); Ratry (penalty shoot-out scored); Ema (penalty shoot-out scored)	2–1	(penalty shoot-out missed) S. Ng; (penalty shoot-out missed) Ho; (penalty shoot-out scored) S. Ng; (penalty shoot-out missed) Sim; (penalty shoot-out missed) Chia

Gifu Prefectural Green Stadium
Umpires:
Yu Tian (CHN)
Emi Yamada (JPN)

== Golf ==
The Singapore Golf Association announced 6 players (3 Men, 3 Women) to participate in both individual and Team events.

Individual

Golfer	Event	Round 1	Round 2	Round 3	Round 4	Total		
Golfer	Event	Score	Score	Score	Score	Score	To Par	Rank
Nicklaus Chiam	Men	75	75	70		220		
James Leow	Men	72	73	67	67	279	–1	19
Hiroshi Tai	Men	70	70	69	64	273	–7	11
Amanda Tan	Women	72	73	75	73	293	＋13	25
Shannon Tan	Women	63	64	71	68	266	–14	3rd place, bronze medalist(s)
Chen Xingtong	Women	69	73	78	70	290	＋10	22

Team

Golfer	Event	Round 1	Round 2	Round 3	Round 4	Total		
Golfer	Event	Score	Score	Score	Score	Score	To Par	Rank
Nicklaus Chiam; James Leow; Hiroshi Tai	Men's	142	143	136	131	552	–8	8
Shannon Tan; Amanda Tan; Chen Xingtong	Women's	132	137	146	138	553	–7	4

== Gymnastics ==
Seventeen athletes will represent the country across all events.

=== Artistic ===
==== Men's team ====
Athlete	Event	Qualification								Final							
Athlete	Event	Apparatus						Individual Final Ranking	Rank	Apparatus						Total	Rank
Athlete	Event	F	PH	R	V	PB	HB	Individual Final Ranking	Rank	F	PH	R	V	PB	HB	Total	Rank
Abdulattif Abdul Barr	Team	-			12.333	11.133	10.866	-	8 Q				9.933	10.833			8
Kenzu Kang	Team	11.266	11.566	10.100	-			-	8 Q		11.633						8
Alfonso Tan You An	Team	10.600	9.833	10.733	11.433	10.333	10.766	19	8 Q	11.033	11.266	10.500	12.033	11.266			8
Cameron Cole Pefianco	Team	10.566	9.466	11.600	11.966	11.466	11.500	18	8 Q	10.000		11.466	12.100	11.000	11.266		8
Asher Pua	Team	11.300	11.400	10.066	12.733	11.733	11.766	16	8 Q	11.266	12.300	11.300	12.933		8.800		8
Total	Team	33.166	32.799	32.433	37.032	34.332	34.132	203.894	-	32.299	35.199	33.266	37.066	32.199	30.899	200.928	8

==== Women's team ====
Athlete	Event	Qualification						Final					
Athlete	Event	Apparatus				Individual Final Ranking	Rank	Apparatus				Total	Rank
Athlete	Event	V	UB	BB	F	Individual Final Ranking	Rank	V	UB	BB	F	Total	Rank
Amanda Yap	Team	12.966	11.033	13.300	12.933	9	6 Q	12.900	9.633	12.666	12.633		8
Alena Tan	Team	12.000	11.166	11.533	11.866	-	6 Q	12.033	11.333		11.600		8
Emma Goh	Team	11.800		11.833	11.433	-	6 Q			11.666			8
Colleen Hong	Team		10.633			-	6 Q		11.866				8
Emma Yap	Team	12.400	10.466	12.066	12.500	13	6 Q	12.366		12.100	12.533		8
Total	Team	37.366	32.832	37.199	37.299	144.696	6 Q	37.299	32.832	36.432	36.766	143.329	8

===== Individual =====
Athlete	Event	Qualification				Final				Final Rank
Athlete	Event	D Score	E Score	Pen	Total	D Score	E Score	Pen	Total	Final Rank
Amanda Yap	Balance Beam	6.5	8.333		14.833 Q	5.2	7.833		13.033	6

=== Rhythmic ===
==== Women's ====
Athlete	Event	Qualification						Final					
Athlete	Event	Hoop	Ball	Clubs	Ribbon	Total	Rank	Hoop	Ball	Clubs	Ribbon	Total	Rank
Mikayla Angeline Yang	Individual All-around	25.550	22.400	25.900	23.700	97.550	12	Did not advance					
Pebbyl Jing Ya Ang	Individual All-around	22.250	21.100	22.650	21.850	87.850	16	Did not advance					
Yue Xuan Thadine Ang; Cleo Chew; Xin Yu Liew; Megan Jiahui Tan; Mirabelle Yu Chelle Yet	Team		15.400	20.250		35.650	9	Did not advance					

== Jiu-jitsu ==
Nine athletes were sent to represent the country (4 men and 5 women).

Athlete	Event	Round of 32	Round of 16	Quarter-finals	Semi-finals/ Reprecharge	Final / BM	
Athlete	Event	Opposition Result	Opposition Result	Opposition Result	Opposition Result	Opposition Result	Rank
Noah Lim	Men's 69 kg	Aldousari (KUW); W 2–0	Badjar (KSA); W 50–0	Batyrbekov (KAZ); W 7–0	Rasmi/ Putri (INA); L 0–4	Did not advance	5
Paul Lim	Men's 77 kg	Bagyshbekov (KGZ); L 0–2	Did not advance				
Jedd Tan	Men's 77 kg	Saleh (KSA); W 2–0	Bolatbek (KAZ); L0-50	Did not advance			
Aacus Ee	Men's 85 kg	link=|alt=|border|22x22px] Nguyễn Tiến Triển (VIE) W 50^{SU}-0	link=|alt=|border|22x22px] Ahmad Al-Quradaghi (QAT) W 50^{SU}-0	link=|alt=|border|22x22px] Kim Min-gyu (KOR) L 0–9	link=|alt=|border|22x22px] Go Utsugi (JPN) W 50^{SU}-0	link=|alt=|border|22x22px] Abdurahman Murtazaliev (KGZ) L 0–2	4
Kayleigh Lim	Women's 48 kg	-	Phung (VIE); L 0–1	Did not advance			
Soojin Hong	Women's 48 kg	-	Vuong (VIE); W 11–0	Alharbi (UAE); L 0-50	Suzuki (THA); L 1–2	Did not advance	
Sofia Rivas	Women's 52 kg	-	Sugun (THA) W 4-4 (advantages)	Eonju (KOR); L 0-50	Rasmi/ Putri (INA); L 2-2 (advantages)	Did not advance	
Tiffany Low	Women's 63 kg	link=|alt=|border|22x22px] Nguyễn Thị Minh Vượng (VIE) L 0–2	Did not advance				
Jaslynn Ee	Women's 63 kg	link=|alt=|border|22x22px] Shen Yu-chin (TPE) L 0–3	Did not advance				

== Karate ==
Athlete	Event	Round of 16	Quarterfinals	Semifinals	Repechage	Final / BM	
Athlete	Event	Opposition Result	Opposition Result	Opposition Result	Opposition Result	Opposition Result	Rank
Isaiah Tang	Men's –75 kg	Nurlanov (KGZ); L 3–4	Did not advance				
Shannon Leong	Women's individual kata	That (CAM); W 4–1	Chu OK (MAC); W 4–1	Ono (JPN); L 0–5	—N/a	Bùi (VIE); L 1–4	5
Marissa Hafezan	Women's –55 kg	Bye	Saeidabadi (IRI); L 1–9	Did not advance	Torvanhxai (LAO); W 2–0	Sanistyarani (INA); L 3–7	5

== Mixed Martial Arts ==
Women's

Athlete	Event	Preliminary	Quarter-finals	Semi-finals	Final	Rank
Athlete	Event	Opposition Result	Opposition Result	Opposition Result	Opposition Result	Rank
Tiffany Teo	60 kg	-	Arezou Salimighalehtaki (IRN) W 3–0	Suchika Tariyal (IND) W 2–0	Khilola Sobirova (UZB) W 3–0	1st place, gold medalist(s)

== Modern pentathlon ==
The country will debut in the event, with Tahir Ahmed Ansari qualifying for the event.

Athlete	Event		Fencing (épée one touch)			Fencing (Direct Elimination)		Obstacle run			Swimming (100 m freestyle)			Combined: shooting/running (10 m laser pistol)/(3000 m)			Total points	Final rank
Athlete	Event		V	D	Rank	Rank	MP Points	Time	Rank	MP points	Time	Rank	MP points	Time	Rank	MP points	Total points	Final rank
Tahir Ansari	Men's individual	Semifinal	6	29	35	16	204	38.32	14	331	1:50.62	18	47	14:00.66	18	460	1042	18
Tahir Ansari	Men's individual	Final	6	29	35	Did not advance												

== Rugby Sevens ==
Team	Event	Pool round				Quarterfinal	Semifinal	Final / BM		Placement Round			
Team	Event	Opposition Score	Opposition Score	Opposition Score	Rank	Opposition Score	Opposition Score	Opposition Score	Rank	Opposition Score	Opposition Score	Opposition Score	Rank
Singapore men's	Men's tournament	United Arab Emirates; L 5–33	Sri Lanka; L 17–33	Philippines; L 12–31	4	Did not advance				Thailand; L 12–17	Kazakhstan; W 22–7	Uzbekistan; W 28–12	10
Singapore women's	Women's tournament	Japan; L 5–36	Thailand; L 0–36	Kazakhstan; L 0–31	4	—N/a	5–8th place semifinals India; L 5–22	Seventh place match Malaysia; W 10–5	7	Did not advance			

== Sailing ==
Athlete	Event	Race																			Total Points	Net Points	Final Rank
Athlete	Event	1	2	3	4	5	6	7	8	9	10	11	12	13	14	15	16	17	18	MR	Total Points	Net Points	Final Rank
Ryan Lo	Men's ILCA 7		5			7				4													5
Ian Goh	Boys' ILCA 4	3			4			2			1												
Sean Kum Nigel Tan	Boys' 29er	6	6		6	4							2										2
John Wong	Boys' iQFoil					2					3												
Jania Ang	Women's ILCA 6		3			2				4													2
Marsha Shahrin	Women's iQFoil	-	-	-	-	6					4												
Mika Tew	Girls' Dinghy			7			5				5												
Angyal Chew	Girls' iQFoil	-	-	-	-	5					5												
Ashlea Tham Ethan Chia	Mixed 420			4		6			6		5												

== Sepak Takraw ==
Athlete	Event	Group Stage				Semifinals	Final	
Athlete	Event	Opposition Score	Opposition Score	Opposition Score	Rank	Opposition Score	Opposition Score	Rank
Abdul Hammirrudin Akmal Musyarraf Hairul Fizly Mohammad Fairuz Muhammad Tasman Youri Adli	Men's Quadrant	South Korea L 0–2	IndonesiaL 0–2	JapanL 0-2	4			

== Shooting ==
Men's

Athlete	Event	Qualification		Final	
Athlete	Event	Points	Rank	Points	Rank
Low Jiang Hao	Men's Skeet	104	40	Did not advance	
Teh Xiu Yi	Women's 25 m Air Pistol	577	14	Did not advance	
Teh Xiu Hong	Women's 25 m Air Pistol	577	13	Did not advance	
Teh Xiu Yi	Women's 10 m Air Pistol	566	33	Did not advance	
Teh Xiu Hong	Women's 10 m Air Pistol	567	30	Did not advance	

== Softball ==
Team	Group Stage								Final / BM	
Team	Opposition Score	Opposition Score	Opposition Score	Opposition Score	Opposition Score	Opposition Score	Opposition Score	Rank	Opposition Score	Rank
Singapore Women's	China; L 0–13	Hong Kong; L 2–5	Chinese Taipei; L 2–9	Japan; L 0–10	Philippines; L 0–10	South Korea; L 1–9	Thailand; W 10–1	7	Did not advance	

== Sports Climbing ==
=== Bouldering ===
Athlete	Event	Semi-finals		Final	
Athlete	Event	Score	Rank	Score	Rank
Luke Goh	Men's	34.7	11	Did not advance	
Gerald Verosil	Men's	48.6	8 Q	10	8
Natalie Goh	Women's	69.4	8 Q	34.8	8
Vanessa Teng	Women's	84.8	5 Q	53.8	7

=== Lead ===
Athlete	Event	Semi-finals		Final	
Athlete	Event	Score	Rank	Score	Rank
Luke Goh	Men's	18+	13	Did not advance	
Gerald Verosil	Men's	20+	11	Did not advance	
Lynette Koh	Women's	25	11	Did not advance	
Vanessa Teng	Women's	23	14	Did not advance	

=== Speed ===
Athlete	Event	Qualification		Round of 16	Quarter-finals	Semi-finals	Final / BM	
Athlete	Event	Best	Rank	Opposition Time	Opposition Time	Opposition Time	Opposition Time	Rank
Ezell Low	Men's	5.21	13 Q	Did not advance				
Andre Alfiyan	Men's	5.84	17	Did not advance				
Jeanette Koh	Women's	8.64	DNQ	Did not advance				
Eilin Tan	Women's	DNF		Did not advance				

== Squash ==
Women's

Athlete	Event	Round of 32	Round of 16	Quarter-finals	Semi-finals	Final	Rank
Au Yong Wai Lynn	Singles	Ugay (UZB); W 3–0	Anahat Singh (IND); L 0–3	Did not advance			
Au Yong Wai Yann	Singles	Ali (PAK); W 3–0	Tanvi Khanna (IND); L 1–3	Did not advance			

Mixed

thlete	Event	Round of 32	Round of 16	Quarter-finals	Semi-finals	Final	Rank
Jayanna Lim Samuel Qwek	Mixed Doubles	Purevjav/Mandahbayar (MGL); W 2–0	Toby Tse/Lai Cheuk Nam (HKG); L 0–2	Did not advance			

== Surfing ==
Singapore qualified one surfer for the games. Camille Spaccarotella makes her debut after qualifying from the Women's Shortboard Open at the Dongsha Surfing Open.

Surfer	Event	Round 1		Round 2	Round 3	Quarter-final	Semi-final	Final	
Surfer	Event	Time	Rank	Time	Time	Time	Time	Time	Rank
Camille Spaccarotella	Women's shortboard	3.26	3 Q	Prakash (IND) L 4.50-7.57	Did not advance				

== Swimming ==
=== Men ===
Event	Athlete	Heats		Final	
Event	Athlete	Time	Rank	Time	Rank
50 m backstroke	Ted Chan	24.97	4 NR	25.37	8
50 m backstroke	Julian Lee	26.51	18	Did not advance	
50m Breaststroke	Chan Junhao	28.17	17	Did not advance	
50m Breaststroke	Zavv Lee	28.52	22	Did not advance	
50m Freestyle	Jonathan Tan	22.43	10 Q	22.46	10
50m Freestyle	Mikkel Lee	22.30	8 Q	22.06	5
50 m Butterfly	Mikkel Lee	23.77	9 Q	22.40	6
50 m Butterfly	Teong Tzen Wei	23.78	10Q	22.38	5
100m Backstroke	Julian Lee	56.58	14	Did not advance	
100m Backstroke	Zackery Tay	56.85	19	Did not advance	
100m Breastroke	Chan Chun Ho	1:02.18	18	Did not advance	
100m Breastroke	Reagan Cheng	1:01.67	15	Did not advance	
100m Freestyle	Mikkel Lee			52.06	10
100m Freestyle	Jonathan Tan			50.21	9
200 m Backstroke	Reagan Cheng	2:01.71	7 Q	2:01.84	9
200 m Backstroke	Zackery Tay	2:05.63	16	Did not advance	
200 m Butterfly	Brandon Yap	2:02.03	11	Did not advance	
	Ardi Azman	2:03.40	15	Did not advance	
200 Individual Freestyle	Ardi Azman	1:49.97	15	Did not advance	
200 Individual Freestyle	Glen Lim	1:49.59	11	Did not advance	
200m Individual Medley	Russel Pang	2:04.27	16	Did not advance	
200m Individual Medley	Reagan Cheng	2:01.25	5 Q	2:02.65	10
400 m Freestyle	Russel Pang	3:55.96	11	Did not advance	
400 m Freestyle	Ian Leong	4:01.48	21	Did not advance	
400m Individual Medley	Reagan Cheng	4:28.08	11		
800 m Freestyle	Nicholas James Tan	8:19.36			
800 m Freestyle	Russel Pang	8:07.50			
1500m Freestyle	Nicholas James Tan	15:57.59	17	Did not advance	
1500m Freestyle	Russel Pang	15:22.16	10	Did not advance	
4 x 100 Freestyle	Ardi Azman; Tedd Chan; Glen Lim; Jonathan Tan	3:21.13	7		
4 x 100 Freestyle Relay	Tedd Chan; Chan Junhao; Ardi Zaman; Mikkel Lee	3:39.76	6 Q	3:40.63	7
4 × 100 m Medley					
4 x 200 Freestyle Relay	Glenn Lim; Brandon Yap; Russel Pang; Ardi Azman	7:22.73	6 Q	7:24.22	8

=== Women ===
Event	Athlete	Heats		Final	
Event	Athlete	Time	Rank	Time	Rank
50 m backstroke	Levenia Sim	29.44	13	Did not advance	
50 m backstroke	Julia Yeo	29.81	16	Did not advance	
50m Breaststroke	Mikayla Tan	31.86	7	31.76	7
50m Breaststroke	Nicole Tay	33.88	17	Did not advance	
50m Butterfly	Teo Chiok Sze	26.44	6 Q	26.36	5
50m Butterfly	Megan Yo	27.66	16	Did not advance	
100 m Freestyle	Amanda Lim				
100 m Freestyle	Yeo Chiok Sze				
100 m Backstroke	Julia Yeo	1:03.89	15	Did not advance	
100 m Backstroke	Levenia Sim	1.48.97	11	Did not advance	
100 m Butterfly	Megan Yo	1:01.68	14	Did not advance	
100m Breaststroke	Mikayla Tan			1:09.98	8
100m Freestyle	Christina Shultz	58.57	21	Did not advance	
100m Freestyle	Kayley Goh	1:01.14	24	Did not advance	
200 m Breaststroke	Mikayla Tan				
200 m Breaststroke	Joy Neo				
200m Freestyle	Christina Shultz	2:06.97	14	Did not advance	
200m Freestyle	Victoria Lim	2:03.72	9 Q	2:04.43	10
200m Individual Medley	Mikayla Tan	2:19.18	12	Did not advance	
200m Individual Medley	Megan Yo	2:20.35	13	Did not advance	
400m Freestyle	Gan Ching Hwee	4:13.05	5 Q	4.06.81 NR	2nd place, silver medalist(s)
400m Freestyle	Victoria Lim	4:20.51	9 Q	4:23.40	10
400 Individual Medley	Elle Tay	1.13.32	15	Did not advance	
400 Individual Medley	Victoria Lim	4:53.63	8 Q	4:54.32	10
800 m freestyle	Gan Ching Hwee	Bye		8:26.25; NR	2nd place, silver medalist(s)
800 m freestyle	Sarah Sim	9:13.62	DNQ		
1500m Freestyle	Gan Ching Hwee	N.A		16:00.45	2nd place, silver medalist(s)
1500m Freestyle	Sarah Sim	N.A		17:21.51	7
4 × 100 m Freestyle Relay	Victoria Lim; Megan Yo; Kayley Goh; Christina Schulz	3:54.74	7	3:51.62	6
4 × 100 m Medley	Julia Yeo Mikayla Tan Megan Yo Victoria Lim	4:11.58	6 Q	4:09.90	6
4 × 200 m Freestyle					

=== Mixed ===
Event	Athlete	Heats		Final	
Event	Athlete	Time	Rank	Time	Rank
4 × 100 m medley relay	Julian Lee; Joy Neo; Megan Yo; Ian Leong			4:01.72	8

== Taekwondo ==
Athlete	Event	Round of 16	Quarter-finals	Semi-finals		Final	
Athlete	Event	Opposition Score	Opposition Score	Opposition Score	Rank	Opposition Score	Rank
Darren Yap	Men's Poonsae Individual	-		8.8300	2 Q	9.0400	3
Darren Yap	Virtual	Asymbek Uulu (KGZ); W 2-0	Bakhitiari (IRN); W 2-0	Chau (VIE); L0-2	-	Did not advance	3
Nicole Shan	Women's Poomsae Individual	-		8.3900	5	Did not advance	

Virtual

== Table tennis ==
Men

Athlete	Event	Round of 64	Round of 32	Round of 16	Quarterfinal	Semifinal	Final / BM	
Athlete	Event	Opposition Result	Opposition Result	Opposition Result	Opposition Result	Opposition Result	Opposition Result	Rank
Izaac Quek	Singles	Bye	Abdulhussein (QAT); W 4–0	Matsushima (JPN); L 2–4	Did not advance			
Pang Koen	Singles	Hagberg (LAO); W 4–3	Alaminian (IRN); L 4–0	Did not advance				
Clarence Chew; Josh Chua	Doubles	Bye	Alaali / Mahfoodh (BRN); W 3–0	Oh/ Lim (KOR); L 0–3	Did not advance			
Izaac Quek; Pang Koen	Doubles	Bye	Dilshodov / Iskandarov (UZB); W 3–0	Wong/ Choong (MAS); W 3-0	Harimoto / Shinozuka (JPN); L 0–3	Did not advance		

Women

Athlete	Event	Round of 32	Round of 16	Quarterfinal	Semifinal	Final / BM	
Athlete	Event	Opposition Result	Opposition Result	Opposition Result	Opposition Result	Opposition Result	Rank
Ser Lin Qian	Singles	Leong (MAC); W 4–0	Kim (PRK); L 0–4	Did not advance			
Zeng Jian	Singles	Abboud (SYR); W 4–0	Joo (KOR); L 2–4	Did not advance			
Chloe Lai; Tan Zhao Yun	Doubles	Thapa / Shrestha (NEP); W WO	Lee/ Kim (KOR); L 0-3	Did not advance			
Loy Ming Ying; Ser Lin Qian	Doubles	Ser-Od / Batmunkh (MGL); W 3–0	Rasmi/ Putri (INA); W 3-0	Doo / Ng (HKG); L 3-0	Did not advance		

Mixed

Athlete	Event	Round of 32	Round of 16	Quarterfinal	Semifinal	Final / BM	
Athlete	Event	Opposition Result	Opposition Result	Opposition Result	Opposition Result	Opposition Result	Rank
Izaac Quek; Loy Ming Ying	Doubles	Feng Y-h / Yeh Y-t (TPE); L 0–3	Did not advance				
Koen Pang; Zeng Jian	Doubles	Shinozuka / Ito (JPN); L 0–3	Did not advance				

Team

Athlete	Event	Group stage				Round of 16	Quarterfinal	Semifinal	Final	
Athlete	Event	Opposition Score	Opposition Score	Opposition Score	Rank	Opposition Score	Opposition Score	Opposition Score	Opposition Score	Rank
Clarence Chew; Ellsworth Le; Izaac Quek; Josh Chua; Koen Pang	Men's	Laos; W 3–1	Kazakhstan; L 1–3	Bangladesh; W 3–0	2 Q	Iran; L 0–3	Did not advance			
Chloe Lai; Loy Ming Ying; Ser Lin Qian; Tan Zhao Yun; Zeng Jian	Women's	Pakistan; W 3–0	India; L 2–3	Indonesia; W 3–0	2 Q	Hong Kong; W 3–2	South Korea; L 0–3	Did not advance		

== Triathlon ==
Individual

Athlete	Event	Time						Rank
Athlete	Event	Swim (0.75 km)	Trans 1	Bike (20 km)	Trans 2	Run (5 km)	Total	Rank
Tey Yi Jun	Men	9:39	0:35	28:22	0:16	17:02	55:54	13
Luke Chua	Men	9:32	0:38	28:26	0:18	17:43	56:37	17
Herlene Yu	Women	10:14	0:45	31:57	0:27	21:50	1:05:13	18
Kathlyn Yeo	Women	10:21	0:44	31:51	0:25	19:51	1:03:12	15

Relay

Athlete	Event	Time						Rank
Athlete	Event	Swim (300 m)	Trans 1	Bike (6.6 km)	Trans 2	Run (1 km)	Total	Rank
Kathlyn Yeo	Mixed	4:27	0:49	11:10	0:24	7:49	24:39	—N/a
Luke Chua	Mixed	4:16	0:45	10:10	0:20	6:27	21:58	—N/a
Wan Ting Lim	Mixed	4:32	0:49	11:33	0:26	7:45	25:05	—N/a
Tey Yi Jun	Mixed	4:05	0:43	10:10	0:19	6:21	21:38	—N/a
Total	Mixed	—N/a					1:33:20	10

== Water Polo ==
Singapore's men and women teams qualified for the games based on entry allocations, continental rankings, and nomination by Singapore Aquatics.

Men's

Team	Event	Group Stage				Quarterfinal	Semifinal / Pl.	Final / BM / Pl.	
Team	Event	Opposition Score	Opposition Score	Opposition Score	Rank	Opposition Score	Opposition Score	Opposition Score	Rank
Singapore men's	Men's tournament	Iran; L 8–19	China; L 4–8	South Korea; PSW 14–14	4	Japan; L 8–32	5–8th place semifinals Hong Kong; L 11–15	Seventh place match Thailand; W 24–14	7

Women's

Team	Event	Group Stage					Rank
Team	Event	Opposition Score	Opposition Score	Opposition Score	Opposition Score	Opposition Score	Rank
Singapore women's	Women's tournament	Kazakhstan; L 7–12	Uzbekistan; L 10–13	China; L 7–28	Japan; L 7–25	Thailand; L 9–12	6

== Wushu ==
=== Taolu ===
Men

Athlete	Event	Event 1		Event 2		Total	Rank
Athlete	Event	Result	Rank	Result	Rank	Total	Rank
Chia Kai Ming	Changquan	9.716	4	—N/a		9.716	4
Jowen Lim	Daoshu & gunshu	9.503	8	9.723		19.226	6
Chan Jun Kai	Taijiquan & taijijian						
Tay Yu Xuan	Taijiquan & taijijian						5

Women

Athlete	Event	Event 1		Event 2		Total	Rank
Athlete	Event	Result	Rank	Result	Rank	Total	Rank
Zoe Tan	Changquan	9.683	9	—N/a		9.683	9
Vera Tan	Taijiquan & taijijian						
Zeanne Law	Taijiquan & taijijian	9.720		9			3rd place, bronze medalist(s)
