= Giulia Rizzi =

Italian fencer (born 1989)

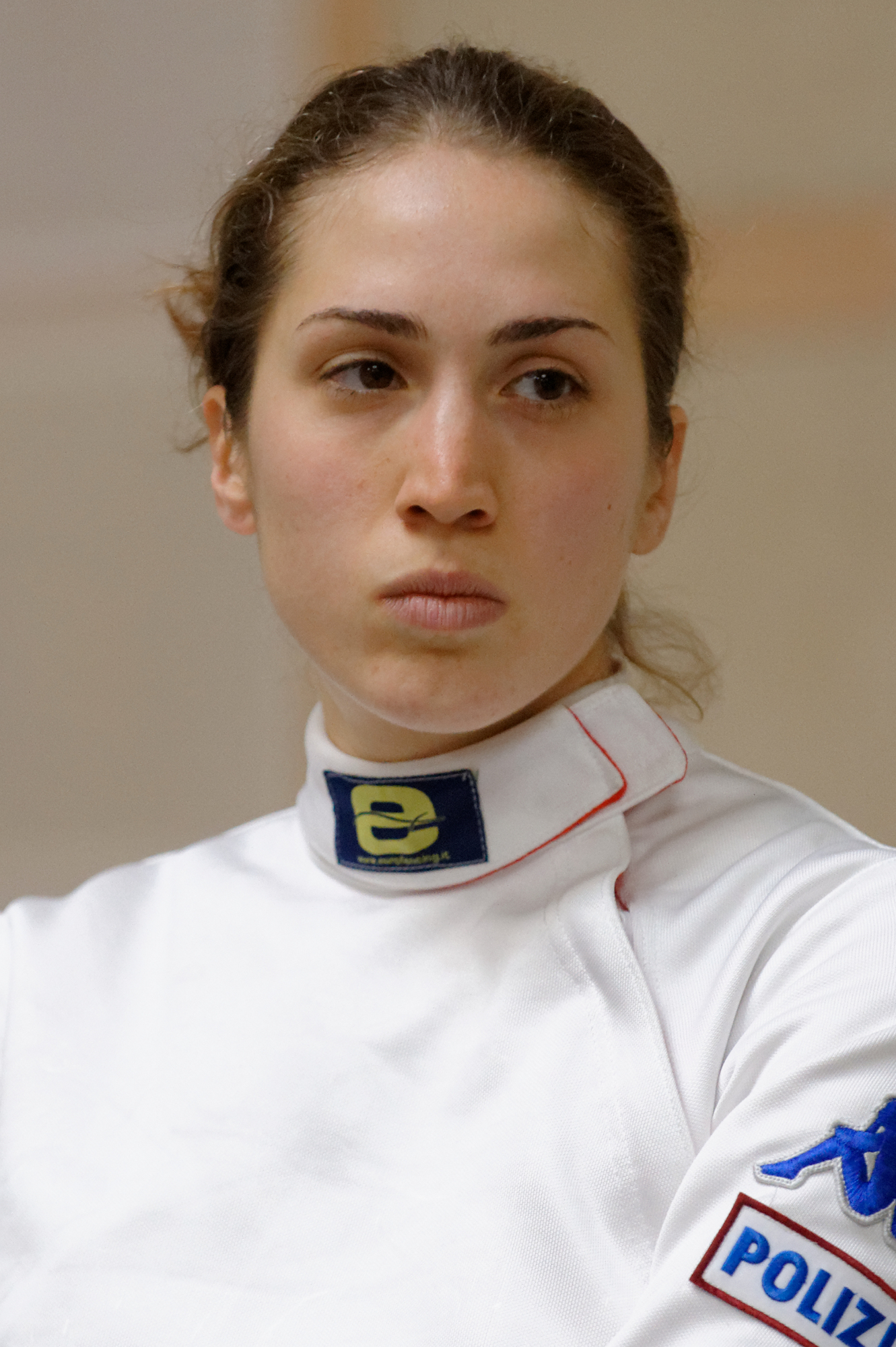
- Rizzi in 2015

Personal information
- Born: 20 June 1989 (age 37) Udine, Italy

Fencing career
- Sport: Fencing
- Country: Italy
- Weapon: Épée
Medal record
Women's épée
Representing Italy
Olympic Games
Gold medal – first place	2024 Paris	Team
World Championships
Gold medal – first place	2026 Hong Kong	Team
Silver medal – second place	2026 Hong Kong	Individual
European Games
Bronze medal – third place	2015 Baku	Team
European Championships
Gold medal – first place	2024 Basel	Team
Bronze medal – third place	2025 Genoa	Team
Mediterranean Games
Gold medal – first place	2022 Oran	Individual

Giulia Rizzi (born 20 June 1989) is an Italian fencer, gold medalist at the 2024 Summer Olympics in the team épée event.

She competed at the 2022 Mediterranean Games where she won a gold medal in the individual épée event.
