= Veronika Zuikova =

Estonian fencer (born 1994)

Personal information
- Born: 17 October 1994 (age 31)

Fencing career
- Sport: Fencing
- Country: Estonia
- Weapon: Épée
- Hand: Right-handed
Medal record
Women's épée
Representing Estonia
World Championships
| Silver medal – second place | 2026 Hong Kong | Team |

Veronika Zuikova (born 17 October 1994) is an Estonian right-handed épée fencer.

== Early life and education ==
Zuikova attended St. John's University where she was a member of the fencing team. During the 2017–18 season, in her senior year, she posted a 79–25 record, which was the second-best on the team and finished second at the NCAA fencing championships. She became a four-time All-American, and earned her first-career First Team All-American honors.

== Career ==
In July 2026, she competed at the 2026 World Fencing Championships in the individual event and qualified for the main draw, before being eliminated in the round of 64. She then competed in the team épée event and advanced to the finals. This marked the first time Estonia reached the women's épée team final since 2017. During the final Estonia lost to Italy 31–30 and won a silver medal.
