= Yim Tae-hee =

South Korean politician (born 1956)

The Honourable Lim Tae-hee
- 임태희
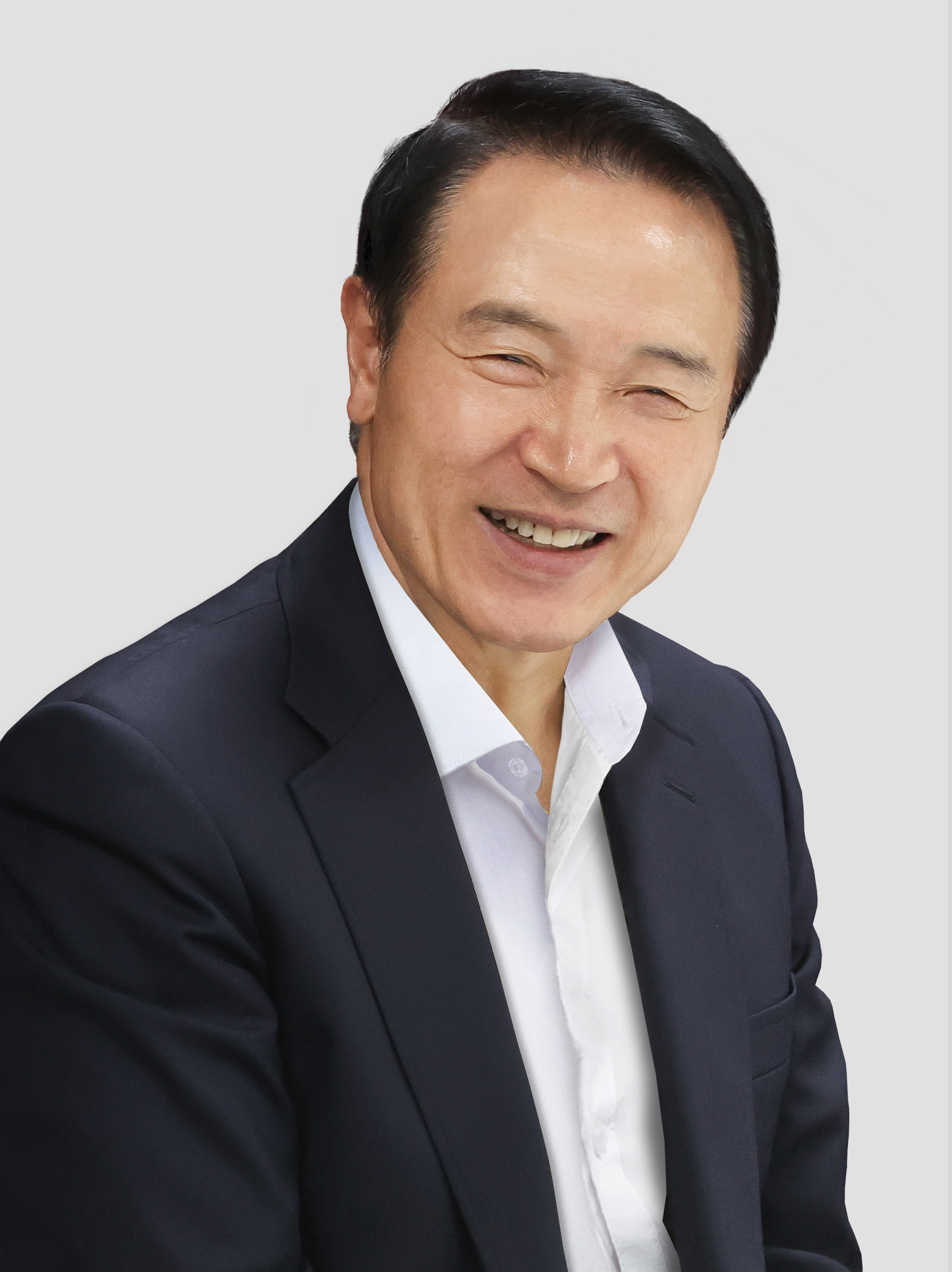
- Yim in 2024

Superintendent of Gyeonggi Provincial Office of Education
- In office 1 July 2022 – 30 June 2026
- Preceded by: Lee Jae-jeong
- Succeeded by: Ahn Min-seok

Chief of Staff to the President
- In office 16 July 2010 – 30 November 2011
- Preceded by: Jeong Jeong-gil
- Succeeded by: Ha Geum-yeol

Minister of Labor
- In office 1 October 2009 – 30 August 2010
- Preceded by: Lee Young-hee
- Succeeded by: Park Jae-wan

Personal details
- Born: 1 December 1956 (age 69) Gwangju, Gyeonggi, South Korea
- Party: Independent
- Education: Seoul National University

Korean name
- Hangul: 임태희
- Hanja: 任太熙
- RR: Im Taehui
- MR: Im T'aehŭi

Lim Tae-hee (Korean: 임태희; born 1 December 1956) is a South Korean politician, incumbent Superintendent of Gyeonggi Provincial Office of Education, and former chief presidential secretary to Lee Myung-bak.

== Election results ==
=== General elections ===
Year	Elections	Constituency	Political party	Votes (%)	Results
2000	16th National Assembly General Election	Seongnam Bundang B (Gyeonggi)	GNP	40,036 (50.86)	Won
2004	17th National Assembly General Election	Seongnam Bundang B (Gyeonggi)	GNP	55,171 (53.95%)	Won
2008	18th National Assembly General Election	Seongnam Bundang B (Gyeonggi)	GNP	52,704 (71.06%)	Won
2014	2014 By-election	Suwon D (Gyeonggi)	Saenuri	34,239 (45.70%)	Defeated (2nd)
2016	20th National Assembly General Election	Seongnam Bundang B (Gyeonggi)	Independent	23,921 (18.81%)	Defeated (3rd)

=== Local elections ===
==== Superintendent of Gyeonggi Provincial Office of Education ====
Year	Elections	Constituency	Political party	Votes (%)	Remarks
2022	8th Iocal Election	Superintendent of Gyeonggi Provincial Office of Education	Independent	3,081,100 (54.79%)	Won
2026	9th Iocal Election	Superintendent of Gyeonggi Provincial Office of Education	Independent	3,178,364 (47.18%)	Defeated (2nd)
