= Yang Seung-hye =

South Korean fencer (born 2006)

Personal information
- Born: 28 July 2006 (age 20)

Fencing career
- Sport: Fencing
- Country: South Korea
- Weapon: Épée
- Hand: Right-handed
Medal record
Women's épée
Representing South Korea
World Championships
Bronze medal – third place	2026 Hong Kong	Team
Asian Games
Silver medal – second place	2026 Aichi-Nagoya	Team

Yang Seung-hye (Korean: 양승혜; born born 28 July 2006) is a South Korean right-handed épée fencer.

== Career ==
On 24 May 2026, during the 2025–26 Fencing World Cup, Yang helped South Korea win team épée gold. In June 2026, she competed at the 2026 Asian Fencing Championships and won a gold medal in the team épée event. The next month she competed at the 2026 World Fencing Championships and won a bronze medal in the team épée event.
