= Song Se-ra =

South Korean fencer (born 1993)

Personal information
- Nationality: South Korean
- Born: 6 September 1993 (age 33) Geumsan County, Chungcheongnam-do, South Korea

Fencing career
- Sport: Fencing
- Weapon: Épée
- FIE ranking: current ranking
Medal record
Women's épée
Representing South Korea
Olympic Games
| Silver medal – second place | 2020 Tokyo | Team |
World Championships
| Gold medal – first place | 2022 Cairo | Individual |
| Gold medal – first place | 2022 Cairo | Team |
| Gold medal – first place | 2026 Hong Kong | Individual |
| Bronze medal – third place | 2023 Milan | Team |
| Bronze medal – third place | 2025 Tbilisi | Individual |
| Bronze medal – third place | 2025 Tblilisi | Team |
| Bronze medal – third place | 2026 Hong Kong | Team |
Asian Games
| Gold medal – first place | 2022 Hangzhou | Team |
| Gold medal – first place | 2026 Aichi-Nagoya | Individual |
| Silver medal – second place | 2022 Hangzhou | Individual |
| Silver medal – second place | 2026 Aichi-Nagoya | Team |
Asian Championships
| Gold medal – first place | 2024 Kuwait City | Team |
| Bronze medal – third place | 2024 Kuwait City | Individual |

Song Se-ra (born 6 September 1993) is a South Korean left-handed épée fencer, 2022 team Asian champion, 2022 individual world champion, and 2021 team Olympic silver medalist.

== Medal record ==
=== Olympic Games ===
| Year | Location | Event | Position |
|---|---|---|---|
| 2021 | Tokyo, Japan | Team Women's Épée | 2nd |

=== World Championship ===
| Year | Location | Event | Position |
|---|---|---|---|
| 2022 | Cairo, Egypt | Individual Women's Épée | 1st |

=== Asian Championship ===
| Year | Location | Event | Position |
|---|---|---|---|
| 2017 | Hong Kong, China | Team Women's Épée | 2nd |
| 2022 | Seoul, South Korea | Team Women's Épée | 1st |

=== Grand Prix ===
| Date | Location | Event | Position |
|---|---|---|---|
| 2020-03-06 | Budapest, Hungary | Individual Women's Épée | 2nd |
| 2022-04-29 | Cairo, Egypt | Individual Women's Épée | 3rd |

=== World Cup ===
| Date | Location | Event | Position |
|---|---|---|---|
| 2016-11-11 | Suzhou, China | Individual Women's Épée | 3rd |
| 2022-02-11 | Barcelona, Spain | Individual Women's Épée | 1st |
