= Malika Khakimova =

Uzbekistani fencer (born 1996)

Personal information
- Nationality: Uzbekistani
- Born: 24 January 1996 (age 29); Navoiy, Uzbekistan

Sport
- Country: Uzbekistan
- Sport: Fencing
- Event: Épée

Malika Khakimova (born 24 January 1996) is an Uzbekistani épée fencer. She competed in the 2020 Summer Olympics. Khakimova is of Tatar descent.
