= Juliana Gomez =

Filipino fencer

Personal information
- Nationality: Filipino
- Born: Juliana Marie Beatriz Torres Gomez; September 8, 2000 (age 26) Quezon City, Metro Manila, Philippines
- Parents: Richard Gomez (father); Lucy Torres (mother)

Sport
- Sport: Fencing
- Handedness: Right
- Rank: 247 (2026–27)
- Weapon: Épée
- University team: University of the Philippines

Achievements and titles
- Highest world ranking: 229 (2023–24)
Medal record
Representing Philippines
Women's fencing
SEA Games
Bronze medal – third place	2025 Thailand	Team épée

Juliana Maria Beatrice Torres Gomez is a Filipino fencer.

== Early life and education ==
Juliana Maria Beatrice Torres Gomez was born on September 8, 2000 in Quezon City, Metro Manila, Philippines. Her parents are sportsperson, actor Richard Gomez and former model Lucy Torres.

Gomez whose father was a fencer, took up fencing at an early age. By high school however, she pursued being a volleyball player.

She attended the University of the Philippines Diliman, graduating in 2024.

== Career ==
=== College ===
Gomez became part of the volleyball program of the University of the Philippines in 2019 joining the UP Fighting Maroons' B team. However the COVID-19 pandemic prompted her to represent her school in fencing.

In Season 85 of the University Athletic Association of the Philippines (UAAP), she won UP's sole gold medal in fencing in the women's epee individual event in February 2023. She defended her title in UAAP Season 86.

=== National team ===
Gomez, who specialize in the épée, placed third in the Philippine Fencing Association and Southeast Asian Qualifying Games in 2021. By 2022, she is already representing the Philippines in international fencing competitions. She won her first gold medal at the Thailand Open Fencing Championship in November 2022.

In 2023, Gomez took part at the Southeast Asian Fencing Federation Championships in Malaysia. Later that year, she fenced at the 2022 Asian Games in Hangzhou, China. She was eliminated in the Round of 32, by Xu Nuo of the host country.

Gomez earned qualification to the Philippine national team for the 2025 SEA Games in Thailand. At the regional games in December, Gomez failed to podium in the women's individual. She however won a bronze medal with the women's team event.

At the 2026 Asian Games in Aichi and Nagoya, Japan, Gomez reached the Round of 16 of the women's individual event. She got eliminated via a P-black card in her final match against Elle Meihui Koh of Singapore.
