= Tang Junyao =

Chinese fencer (born 2003)

Personal information
- Born: 10 August 2003 (age 23)

Fencing career
- Sport: Fencing
- Country: China
- Weapon: Épée
- Hand: Right-handed
Medal record
Women's épée
Representing China
World Championships
Bronze medal – third place	2026 Hong Kong	Individual
Asian Games
Bronze medal – third place	2022 Hangzhou	Team
Gold medal – first place	2026 Aichi-Nagoya	Team
World University Games
Gold medal – first place	2021 Chengdu	Team
Asian Championships
Silver medal – second place	2024 Kuwait City	Team
Bronze medal – third place	2023 Wuxi	Team

Tang Junyao (Chinese: 唐君瑶; born 10 August 2003) is a Chinese right-handed épée fencer. She represented China at the 2024 Summer Olympics.

== Career ==
Tang competed at the 2023 Asian Fencing Championships and won a bronze medal in the team event. She again competed at the 2024 Asian Fencing Championships and won a silver medal in the team event.

In March 2024, she qualified to represent China at the 2024 Summer Olympics. She competed in the team event, and lost to Poland in the bronze medal match.

In July 2026, she competed at the 2026 World Fencing Championships and won a bronze medal in the individual épée event.
