= Kiria Tikanah =

Singaporean fencer (born 2000)

Personal information
- Full name: Kiria Tikanah Abdul Rahman
- National team: Singapore
- Born: 25 June 2000 (age 26) Singapore
- Height: 1.71 m (5 ft 7 in)
- Weight: 58 kg (128 lb)

Sport
- Sport: Fencing
- Rank: 75
Medal record
Women's épée
Representing Singapore
Asian Games
Silver medal – second place	2026 Aichi Nagoya	Individual
Bronze medal – third place	2026 Aichi-Nagoya	Team
SEA Games
Gold medal – first place	2019 Philippines	Individual
Silver medal – second place	2021 Vietnam	Individual
Bronze medal – third place	2023 Cambodia	Individual
Asian Fencing Championships
Bronze medal – third place	2025 Bali	Individual
- Updated on 24 September 2026

Kiria Tikanah Abdul Rahman (born 25 June 2000) is a Singaporean épée fencer. She competed in the 2020 and 2024 Summer Olympics.

== Education ==
Kira studied chemistry at National University of Singapore

== Career ==
Kiria started her fencing career at 10 as a foil fencer but changed to épée at the age of 12.

Kiria won the gold medal for the individual épée event during the 2019 SEA Games.

In April 2021, Kiria qualified for the 2020 Summer Olympics. During the Olympics Games, Kiria won 15-11 over Hong Kong’s Coco Lin in the round of 64 but lost 10-15 to Romania’s Ana Maria Popescu in the round of 32.

During the 2021 SEA Games, Kiria lost to follow teammate Elle Koh in the finals and won the silver medal. Kiria failed to reach the finals during the 2023 SEA Games and won the joint bronze medal with Ivy Claire Dinoy of the Philippines.

In 2023, Kiria reached the round of 16 of the Asian Fencing Championships but failed to break out of it. In the same year, during the 2022 Asian Games, Kiria also lost in the round of 16.

On 28 April 2024, Kiria qualified for the 2024 Summer Olympics when she defeated India’s Taniksha Khatri at the Asia-Oceania Zonal Olympic Qualifier. During the Olympics Games, Kiria won her first match against Peru’s Maria Calderon 15-14 in the round of 64 but eventually lost to world number 3 Italy's Alberta Santuccio in the round of 32.

In the 2024 Asian Fencing Championships, Kiria failed to make it past the round of 32.

In 2025, Kiria won all her bouts in the pool stage for the 2025 Asian Fencing Championships. As a result, she received a bye and compete directly at the round of 32. She then won against Kazakhstan’s Sofiya Nikolaichuk and India's Taniksha Khatri and made it to the quarter-final stage. Kiria later beat Hong Kong's Chan Wai Ling 15-11 to set up a semi-final match against world rank number one Song Se-ra of South Korea. Kiria lost to Song 15-12 and won a joint bronze medal, her first medal for the Championships.
