= Miho Yoshimura =

Japanese fencer

Miho Yoshimura (吉村美穂, Yoshimura Miho; born 14 October 1997) is a Japanese fencer. She competed at the 2024 Summer Olympics in the Women's épée, where she defeated Sun Yiwen, the 2020 Summer Olympics gold medalist, in the second round. She was defeated by Vlada Kharkova in the round of 16.
