= Taniksha Khatri =

Indian fencer (born 2003)

Personal information
- Full name: Taniksha Khatri
- Born: 23 September 2003 (age 23) Hometown:Chatia Auliya,Sonipat Born:Karnal, Haryana, India
- Home town: Paris, France
- Height: 164 cm (5 ft 5 in)
- Weight: 57 kg (126 lb)

Fencing career
- Sport: Fencing
- Country: India
- Training location: France
- Weapon: Épée
- Hand: Right-handed
- Head coach: Mohit Ashwini; Nathalie Moellhausen
- Highest ranking: 57
- Current ranking: 140 (October 2024)
- FIE ranking: 140
- FIE profile
Medal record
Women's épée fencing
Representing India
Commonwealth Junior Championships
Silver medal – second place	2022 London	Individual
Silver medal – second place	2022 London	Team
Asian Junior Championships
Silver medal – second place	2022 Tashkent	Team

Taniksha Khatri (23 September 2003) is an Indian fencer specializing in the épée category. She's a silver medalist at the Commonwealth Junior Championships and the Asian Junior Championships.

== Early life ==
Originally from village Chatia Auliya,Sonipat District,Khatri was born on 23 September 2003 in a Jat Family of Karnal, Haryana. Her father Sonu Khatri is a policeman and former athlete who had to retire from sports due to a back surgery. Khatri's foray into fencing first happened at a summer camp in 2015 organized by DAV Police Public School.

== Career ==
Khatri started her career as a foil fencer, winning a gold medal in the U-14 division. Upon the recommendation of her coach, Mohit Ashwini, she switched to the épée category. She won a bronze medal in her first year competing in épée and became a three-time Junior National Champion.

Khatri reached the quarterfinals of the 2022 Asian Games, marking the best performance by an Indian fencer at the event. At the Doha Grand Prix, she finished 31st out of 124 fencers. Despite narrowly missing out on qualifying for the Paris 2024 Olympics, she continues to train and compete internationally, with her sights set on the Los Angeles 2028 Olympics.

== Achievements ==
=== Commonwealth Junior Championships ===
Year	Category	Opponent	Result	Ref
2022	Épée individual	(England) Julia Caron	2nd place, silver medalist(s)	
2022	Épée team	England	2nd place, silver medalist(s)	

=== Asian Junior Championships ===
Year	Category	Opponent	Result	Ref
2022	Épée team	Uzbekistan	2nd place, silver medalist(s)	

== See also ==
- Fencing in India
