= Fencing at the 2017 Summer Universiade – Men's individual épée =

Men's individual épée at the XXIX Summer Universiade
- Venues: Taipei Nangang Exhibition Center
- Dates: 21 August 2017
- Competitors: 97 from 34 nations

Medalists
| 1st place, gold medalist(s) | | Sergey Bida | Russia |
| 2nd place, silver medalist(s) | | Zsombor Bányai | Hungary |
| 3rd place, bronze medalist(s) | | Masaru Yamada | Japan |
| 3rd place, bronze medalist(s) | | Filip Broniszewski | Poland |

The men's individual épée fencing event at the 2017 Summer Universiade was held 21 August at the Taipei Nangang Exhibition Center in Taipei, Taiwan.

== Pool Results ==
| Qualified for Ranking Round |

=== Pool 1 ===
| # | Seed | Athlete | 1 | 2 | 3 | 4 | 5 | 6 | 7 | V# | M# | Ind. | TG | TR | Diff. | RP | RT |
|---|---|---|---|---|---|---|---|---|---|---|---|---|---|---|---|---|---|
| 1 | 1 | Koki Kano (JPN) | | V | D_{4} | V | V | V | V_{2} | 5 | 6 | 0.833 | 26 | 12 | 14 | 1 | 6 |
| 2 | 28 | Alexis Bayard (SUI) | D_{3} | | D_{4} | V | V | V | D_{4} | 3 | 6 | 0.500 | 26 | 23 | 3 | 4 | 46 |
| 3 | 29 | Filip Broniszewski (POL) | V | V | | V | D_{3} | V | D_{3} | 4 | 6 | 0.667 | 26 | 22 | 4 | 3 | 35 |
| 4 | 55 | Georgiy Bruev (RUS) | D_{3} | D_{3} | D_{4} | | D_{3} | V | D_{1} | 1 | 6 | 0.167 | 19 | 26 | –7 | 6 | 77 |
| 5 | 57 | Anton Kimfors (SWE) | D_{0} | D_{2} | V | V | | V | D_{3} | 3 | 6 | 0.500 | 20 | 22 | –2 | 5 | 55 |
| 6 | 84 | Tushar Ravsaheb Aher (IND) | D_{0} | D_{3} | D_{0} | D_{1} | D_{1} | | D_{1} | 0 | 6 | 0.000 | 6 | 30 | –24 | 7 | 96 |
| 7 | 86 | Valerio Cuomo (ITA) | D_{1} | V | V | V | V | V | | 5 | 6 | 0.833 | 26 | 14 | 12 | 2 | 11 |

=== Pool 2 ===
| # | Seed | Athlete | 1 | 2 | 3 | 4 | 5 | 6 | 7 | V# | M# | Ind. | TG | TR | Diff. | RP | RT |
|---|---|---|---|---|---|---|---|---|---|---|---|---|---|---|---|---|---|
| 1 | 2 | Ruslan Kurbanov (KAZ) | | D_{1} | V | D_{3} | V | V | V | 4 | 6 | 0.667 | 24 | 19 | 5 | 3 | 34 |
| 2 | 27 | Lorenzo Buzzi (ITA) | V | | D_{2} | D_{4} | V | D_{1} | V | 3 | 6 | 0.500 | 22 | 19 | 3 | 4 | 47 |
| 3 | 30 | Sergey Bida (RUS) | D_{2} | V | | D_{2} | V | V | V | 4 | 6 | 0.667 | 24 | 18 | 6 | 2 | 31 |
| 4 | 56 | Hwang Hyeon-il (KOR) | V | V | V | | D | V | V | 5 | 6 | 0.833 | 29 | 20 | 9 | 1 | 19 |
| 5 | 58 | Teemu Seeve (FIN) | D_{4} | D_{3} | D_{2} | V | | V | V | 3 | 6 | 0.500 | 24 | 24 | 0 | 5 | 51 |
| 6 | 82 | Sándor Cho Taeun (HUN) | D_{3} | V | D_{4} | D_{4} | D_{1} | | V | 2 | 6 | 0.333 | 22 | 21 | 1 | 6 | 64 |
| 7 | 85 | Vir Sangram Singh (IND) | D_{0} | D_{0} | D_{0} | D_{2} | D_{4} | D_{0} | | 0 | 6 | 0.000 | 6 | 30 | –24 | 7 | 96 |

=== Pool 3 ===
| # | Seed | Athlete | 1 | 2 | 3 | 4 | 5 | 6 | 7 | V# | M# | Ind. | TG | TR | Diff. | RP | RT |
|---|---|---|---|---|---|---|---|---|---|---|---|---|---|---|---|---|---|
| 1 | 3 | Richard Schmidt (GER) | | V | V | V | V | V | D_{2} | 5 | 6 | 0.833 | 27 | 14 | 13 | 1 | 7 |
| 2 | 26 | Daniel Berta (HUN) | D_{3} | | D_{4} | D_{2} | V | V | V | 3 | 6 | 0.500 | 24 | 19 | 5 | 4 | 40 |
| 3 | 31 | Yuval Shalom Freilich (ISR) | D_{2} | V | | V | V | V | V | 5 | 6 | 0.833 | 27 | 16 | 11 | 2 | 15 |
| 4 | 54 | Jan Wenglarczyk (POL) | D_{2} | V | D_{3} | | V_{4} | V | V | 4 | 6 | 0.667 | 24 | 18 | 6 | 3 | 33 |
| 5 | 59 | Nicolas Ferreira (BRA) | D_{2} | D_{1} | D_{1} | D_{3} | | V | V | 2 | 6 | 0.333 | 17 | 25 | –8 | 5 | 72 |
| 6 | 83 | Bat-Erdene Erdenebat (MGL) | D_{0} | D_{2} | D_{1} | D_{0} | D_{3} | | V | 1 | 6 | 0.167 | 11 | 29 | –18 | 7 | 89 |
| 7 | 87 | Akshay Manoharan Sajitha (IND) | V | D_{1} | D_{2} | D_{3} | D_{3} | D_{4} | | 1 | 6 | 0.167 | 18 | 27 | –9 | 6 | 80 |

=== Pool 4 ===
| # | Seed | Athlete | 1 | 2 | 3 | 4 | 5 | 6 | 7 | V# | M# | Ind. | TG | TR | Diff. | RP | RT |
|---|---|---|---|---|---|---|---|---|---|---|---|---|---|---|---|---|---|
| 1 | 4 | Alexandre Bardenet (FRA) | | V | D | V | V | V | V | 5 | 6 | 0.833 | 26 | 15 | 11 | 2 | 16 |
| 2 | 25 | Gabriele Cimini (ITA) | D_{3} | | D_{4} | V | D_{4} | V | V | 3 | 6 | 0.500 | 26 | 22 | 4 | 3 | 42 |
| 3 | 32 | Alexandre Pittet (SUI) | V | V | | D_{3} | V | V | V | 5 | 6 | 0.833 | 28 | 17 | 11 | 1 | 14 |
| 4 | 53 | David van Nunen (NED) | D_{2} | D_{4} | V | | V | D_{2} | V | 3 | 6 | 0.500 | 23 | 25 | –2 | 4 | 54 |
| 5 | 60 | Nikolaus Bodoczi (GER) | D_{1} | V | D_{3} | D_{3} | | D_{0} | D_{4} | 1 | 6 | 0.167 | 16 | 25 | –9 | 6 | 82 |
| 6 | 81 | Kentaro Murayama (JPN) | D_{3} | D_{1} | D_{3} | V | V_{1} | | V | 3 | 6 | 0.500 | 18 | 20 | –2 | 5 | 57 |
| 7 | 88 | José Bartissol (POR) | D_{1} | D_{2} | D_{1} | D_{4} | V | D_{3} | | 1 | 6 | 0.167 | 16 | 29 | –13 | 7 | 86 |

=== Pool 5 ===
| # | Seed | Athlete | 1 | 2 | 3 | 4 | 5 | 6 | 7 | V# | M# | Ind. | TG | TR | Diff. | RP | RT |
|---|---|---|---|---|---|---|---|---|---|---|---|---|---|---|---|---|---|
| 1 | 5 | Martin Rubes (CZE) | | V_{4} | V | V | V | V | V | 6 | 6 | 1.000 | 29 | 14 | 15 | 1 | 3 |
| 2 | 24 | Ryosuke Narita (JPN) | D_{2} | | V | V | V | V | V | 5 | 6 | 0.833 | 27 | 15 | 12 | 2 | 10 |
| 3 | 33 | Gergely Siklósi (HUN) | D_{1} | D_{2} | | V | V | D_{4} | V | 3 | 6 | 0.500 | 22 | 20 | 2 | 3 | 48 |
| 4 | 52 | Dulguun Enkhtsogt (MGL) | D_{3} | D_{2} | D_{3} | | D_{1} | D_{2} | D_{4} | 0 | 6 | 0.000 | 15 | 30 | –15 | 7 | 91 |
| 5 | 61 | Amit Parizat (ISR) | D_{1} | D_{3} | D_{2} | V | | V | V | 3 | 6 | 0.500 | 21 | 21 | 0 | 4 | 52 |
| 6 | 80 | Rafael Tulen (NED) | D_{4} | D_{2} | V | V | D_{4} | | D_{3} | 2 | 6 | 0.333 | 23 | 26 | –3 | 5 | 65 |
| 7 | 89 | Pankaj Kumar Sharma (IND) | D_{3} | D_{2} | D_{0} | V | D_{1} | V | | 2 | 6 | 0.333 | 16 | 27 | –11 | 6 | 74 |

=== Pool 6 ===
| # | Seed | Athlete | 1 | 2 | 3 | 4 | 5 | 6 | 7 | V# | M# | Ind. | TG | TR | Diff. | RP | RT |
|---|---|---|---|---|---|---|---|---|---|---|---|---|---|---|---|---|---|
| 1 | 6 | Dmitriy Alexanin (KAZ) | | V | D_{2} | D_{2} | V | V | V | 4 | 6 | 0.667 | 24 | 20 | 4 | 4 | 37 |
| 2 | 23 | Chuang Po-yu (TPE) | D_{3} | | V | D_{1} | D_{4} | D_{2} | D_{2} | 1 | 6 | 0.167 | 17 | 29 | –12 | 7 | 84 |
| 3 | 34 | Virgile Marchal (CZE) | V | D_{4} | | D_{4} | V | V | V | 4 | 6 | 0.667 | 28 | 19 | 9 | 2 | 32 |
| 4 | 51 | Roman Svichkar (UKR) | V | V | V | | V | V | D_{4} | 5 | 6 | 0.833 | 29 | 18 | 11 | 1 | 12 |
| 5 | 62 | Alexander Riedel (GER) | D_{3} | V | D_{3} | D_{3} | | D_{4} | D_{3} | 1 | 6 | 0.167 | 21 | 29 | –8 | 6 | 78 |
| 6 | 79 | Antoine El Choueiry (LBN) | D_{0} | V | D_{1} | D_{3} | V | | D_{2} | 2 | 6 | 0.333 | 16 | 26 | –10 | 5 | 73 |
| 7 | 90 | Pavel Tychler (RSA) | D_{4} | V | D_{3} | V | V | V | | 4 | 6 | 0.667 | 27 | 21 | 6 | 3 | 29 |

=== Pool 7 ===
| # | Seed | Athlete | 1 | 2 | 3 | 4 | 5 | 6 | 7 | V# | M# | Ind. | TG | TR | Diff. | RP | RT |
|---|---|---|---|---|---|---|---|---|---|---|---|---|---|---|---|---|---|
| 1 | 7 | Masaru Yamada (JPN) | | D_{3} | V | V | V | V | V | 5 | 6 | 0.833 | 28 | 16 | 12 | 1 | 8 |
| 2 | 22 | Tristan Tulen (NED) | V | | V | V | D_{4} | V | V | 5 | 6 | 0.833 | 29 | 18 | 11 | 2 | 12 |
| 3 | 35 | Jacob Hoyle (USA) | D_{3} | D_{3} | | V | V | D_{3} | V | 3 | 6 | 0.500 | 24 | 20 | 4 | 4 | 44 |
| 4 | 50 | Amarbold Batsuren (MGL) | D_{1} | D_{2} | D_{4} | | D_{1} | D_{0} | D_{1} | 0 | 6 | 0.000 | 9 | 30 | –21 | 7 | 93 |
| 5 | 65 | Ting Hong-kai (TPE) | D_{2} | V | D_{0} | V | | V | V | 4 | 6 | 0.667 | 22 | 20 | 2 | 3 | 39 |
| 6 | 78 | Kim Jae-won (KOR) | D_{2} | D_{4} | V | V | D_{3} | | V | 3 | 6 | 0.500 | 24 | 20 | 4 | 4 | 44 |
| 7 | 91 | Max Korlinge (SWE) | D_{3} | D_{1} | D_{1} | V | D_{2} | D_{2} | | 1 | 6 | 0.167 | 14 | 26 | –12 | 6 | 85 |

=== Pool 8 ===
| # | Seed | Athlete | 1 | 2 | 3 | 4 | 5 | 6 | 7 | V# | M# | Ind. | TG | TR | Diff. | RP | RT |
|---|---|---|---|---|---|---|---|---|---|---|---|---|---|---|---|---|---|
| 1 | 8 | Michele Niggeler (SUI) | | V | V | V | D_{4} | V | V | 5 | 6 | 0.833 | 29 | 19 | 10 | 2 | 17 |
| 2 | 21 | Flavio Giannotte (LUX) | D_{3} | | V | D_{1} | D_{0} | V | V | 3 | 6 | 0.500 | 19 | 23 | –4 | 5 | 60 |
| 3 | 36 | Dmitriy Gusev (RUS) | D_{3} | D_{4} | | V | D_{2} | V | V | 3 | 6 | 0.500 | 24 | 19 | 5 | 4 | 40 |
| 4 | 49 | Ariel Drizin (ISR) | D_{3} | V | D_{3} | | V | V | V | 4 | 6 | 0.667 | 26 | 18 | 8 | 3 | 27 |
| 5 | 63 | Gabriel Canaux (USA) | V | V | V | D_{3} | | V | V | 5 | 6 | 0.833 | 28 | 16 | 12 | 1 | 8 |
| 6 | 77 | Jigjidsuren Tsoggerel (MGL) | D_{2} | D_{2} | D_{0} | D_{2} | D_{1} | | D_{1} | 0 | 6 | 0.000 | 8 | 30 | –22 | 7 | 94 |
| 7 | 92 | Pak Min-woo (KOR) | D_{3} | D_{2} | D_{1} | D_{2} | D_{4} | V | | 1 | 6 | 0.167 | 17 | 26 | –9 | 6 | 81 |

=== Pool 9 ===
| # | Seed | Athlete | 1 | 2 | 3 | 4 | 5 | 6 | 7 | V# | M# | Ind. | TG | TR | Diff. | RP | RT |
|---|---|---|---|---|---|---|---|---|---|---|---|---|---|---|---|---|---|
| 1 | 9 | Mathias Biabiany (FRA) | | V_{2} | D_{4} | V_{4} | D_{1} | V | V | 4 | 6 | 0.667 | 21 | 18 | 3 | 3 | 38 |
| 2 | 19 | Volodymyr Stankevych (UKR) | D_{1} | | D_{2} | V | V | V | V | 4 | 6 | 0.667 | 23 | 11 | 12 | 2 | 24 |
| 3 | 37 | Peeter Turnau (EST) | V | V | | D_{4} | D_{2} | V | D_{4} | 3 | 6 | 0.500 | 25 | 21 | 4 | 4 | 43 |
| 4 | 48 | Troels Christian Robl (DEN) | D_{1} | D_{0} | V | | D_{4} | V | V | 3 | 6 | 0.500 | 20 | 22 | –2 | 5 | 55 |
| 5 | 64 | Justin Yoo (USA) | V | D_{0} | V | V | | V | V | 5 | 6 | 0.833 | 25 | 16 | 9 | 1 | 21 |
| 6 | 76 | Ip Yuan Chang (SGP) | D_{2} | D_{2} | D_{0} | D_{1} | D_{1} | | D_{2} | 0 | 6 | 0.000 | 8 | 30 | –22 | 7 | 94 |
| 7 | 93 | Xu Jingjing (CHN) | D_{4} | D_{2} | V | D_{3} | D_{3} | V | | 2 | 6 | 0.333 | 22 | 26 | –4 | 6 | 68 |

=== Pool 10 ===
| # | Seed | Athlete | 1 | 2 | 3 | 4 | 5 | 6 | 7 | V# | M# | Ind. | TG | TR | Diff. | RP | RT |
|---|---|---|---|---|---|---|---|---|---|---|---|---|---|---|---|---|---|
| 1 | 10 | Anatoliy Herey (UKR) | | D_{4} | V | V | V | V | D_{3} | 4 | 6 | 0.667 | 27 | 20 | 7 | 3 | 28 |
| 2 | 20 | Zsombor Bányai (HUN) | V | | D_{4} | V | V | V | V | 5 | 6 | 0.833 | 29 | 20 | 9 | 1 | 19 |
| 3 | 38 | Lewis Weiss (USA) | D_{4} | V | | V | V | V | D_{3} | 4 | 6 | 0.667 | 27 | 21 | 6 | 4 | 29 |
| 4 | 47 | Ivan Deryabin (KAZ) | D_{3} | D_{3} | D_{3} | | V | V | V | 3 | 6 | 0.500 | 24 | 25 | –1 | 5 | 53 |
| 5 | 66 | Jan Cipar (SVK) | D_{1} | D_{3} | D_{1} | D_{2} | | D_{4} | D_{1} | 0 | 6 | 0.000 | 12 | 30 | –18 | 7 | 92 |
| 6 | 75 | Wong Tsz Ho (HKG) | D_{2} | D_{1} | D_{3} | D_{4} | V | | D_{2} | 1 | 6 | 0.167 | 17 | 28 | –11 | 6 | 83 |
| 7 | 94 | Shen Zihao (CHN) | V | D_{4} | V | D_{4} | V | V_{4} | | 4 | 6 | 0.667 | 27 | 19 | 8 | 2 | 26 |

=== Pool 11 ===
| # | Seed | Athlete | 1 | 2 | 3 | 4 | 5 | 6 | 7 | V# | M# | Ind. | TG | TR | Diff. | RP | RT |
|---|---|---|---|---|---|---|---|---|---|---|---|---|---|---|---|---|---|
| 1 | 11 | Niko Vuorinen (FIN) | | D_{3} | V | V | D_{2} | V | V | 4 | 6 | 0.667 | 25 | 11 | 14 | 2 | 23 |
| 2 | 18 | Georg Kuhn (SUI) | V_{4} | | V | D_{2} | D_{1} | V | D_{3} | 3 | 6 | 0.500 | 20 | 24 | –4 | 4 | 59 |
| 3 | 39 | Bradley Johnston Leyer (CRC) | D_{1} | D_{3} | | V | D_{2} | V | V | 3 | 6 | 0.500 | 21 | 25 | –4 | 3 | 58 |
| 4 | 46 | Vadim Sharlaimov (KAZ) | D_{1} | V | D_{4} | | D_{3} | V | D_{1} | 2 | 6 | 0.333 | 19 | 24 | –5 | 5 | 69 |
| 5 | 67 | Ruslan Eskov (EST) | V_{3} | V | V | V | | V | V | 6 | 6 | 1.000 | 28 | 9 | 19 | 1 | 1 |
| 6 | 74 | Serge Mes (NED) | D_{1} | D_{3} | D_{2} | D_{2} | D_{1} | | V | 1 | 6 | 0.167 | 14 | 29 | –15 | 7 | 88 |
| 7 | 95 | Nicolas Poncin (BEL) | D_{1} | V | D_{4} | V | D_{0} | D_{4} | | 2 | 6 | 0.333 | 19 | 24 | –5 | 5 | 69 |

=== Pool 12 ===
| # | Seed | Athlete | 1 | 2 | 3 | 4 | 5 | 6 | 7 | V# | M# | Ind. | TG | TR | Diff. | RP | RT |
|---|---|---|---|---|---|---|---|---|---|---|---|---|---|---|---|---|---|
| 1 | 12 | Ido Herpe (ISR) | | V_{2} | V | V | V | V | V | 6 | 6 | 1.000 | 27 | 14 | 13 | 1 | 4 |
| 2 | 17 | Richard Pokorny (FRA) | D_{1} | | D_{4} | V | V | V_{4} | V | 4 | 6 | 0.667 | 24 | 18 | 6 | 2 | 25 |
| 3 | 40 | Wu Yu-ting (TPE) | D_{3} | V | | D_{2} | D_{4} | D_{1} | D_{3} | 1 | 6 | 0.167 | 18 | 26 | –8 | 6 | 79 |
| 4 | 45 | Yan Sych (UKR) | D_{4} | D_{4} | V | | D_{2} | V | V | 3 | 6 | 0.500 | 25 | 24 | 1 | 4 | 49 |
| 5 | 68 | Rufus Panelius (FIN) | D_{2} | D_{3} | V | V | | V | V | 4 | 6 | 0.667 | 25 | 21 | 4 | 3 | 36 |
| 6 | 73 | Henrik Jarl (SWE) | D_{1} | D_{0} | V_{2} | D_{4} | D_{3} | | D_{2} | 1 | 6 | 0.167 | 12 | 25 | –13 | 7 | 87 |
| 7 | 96 | Ye Deze (CHN) | D_{3} | D_{4} | V | D_{3} | D_{2} | V | | 2 | 6 | 0.333 | 22 | 25 | –3 | 5 | 66 |

=== Pool 13 ===
| # | Seed | Athlete | 1 | 2 | 3 | 4 | 5 | 6 | 7 | V# | M# | Ind. | TG | TR | Diff. | RP | RT |
|---|---|---|---|---|---|---|---|---|---|---|---|---|---|---|---|---|---|
| 1 | 13 | Chen Tsung-lin (TPE) | | D_{0} | D_{2} | D_{2} | V | V | V_{3} | 3 | 6 | 0.500 | 17 | 22 | –5 | 4 | 61 |
| 2 | 16 | Jonathan Bonnaire (FRA) | V | | V | V | V | V | V | 6 | 6 | 1.000 | 30 | 15 | 15 | 1 | 2 |
| 3 | 41 | Ng Ho Tin (HKG) | V_{3} | D_{4} | | V | V | V | V | 5 | 6 | 0.833 | 27 | 17 | 10 | 2 | 18 |
| 4 | 44 | Daniel Marcol (POL) | V | D_{3} | D_{2} | | D_{4} | V | D_{1} | 2 | 6 | 0.333 | 20 | 26 | –6 | 6 | 71 |
| 5 | 69 | Alexander Korlath (AUT) | D_{4} | D_{2} | D_{4} | V | | V | D_{4} | 2 | 6 | 0.333 | 24 | 28 | –4 | 5 | 67 |
| 6 | 72 | Jan Szalay (SVK) | D_{3} | D_{4} | D_{2} | D_{4} | D_{4} | | D_{2} | 0 | 6 | 0.000 | 19 | 30 | –11 | 7 | 90 |
| 7 | 97 | Jang Hyo-min (KOR) | D_{2} | D_{2} | D_{2} | V | V | V | | 3 | 6 | 0.500 | 21 | 20 | 1 | 3 | 50 |

=== Pool 14 ===
| # | Seed | Athlete | 1 | 2 | 3 | 4 | 5 | 6 | V# | M# | Ind. | TG | TR | Diff. | RP | RT |
|---|---|---|---|---|---|---|---|---|---|---|---|---|---|---|---|---|
| 1 | 14 | Alan Fardzinov (RUS) | | D_{4} | V | V | V | V | 4 | 5 | 0.800 | 24 | 13 | 11 | 2 | 22 |
| 2 | 15 | Lukas Bellmann (GER) | V | | V | V | V | V | 5 | 5 | 1.000 | 25 | 14 | 11 | 1 | 5 |
| 3 | 42 | Federico Vismara (ITA) | D_{1} | D_{1} | | V | V | D_{4} | 2 | 5 | 0.400 | 16 | 19 | –3 | 4 | 63 |
| 4 | 43 | Max Rod (POR) | D_{4} | D_{2} | D_{3} | | V_{4} | V | 2 | 5 | 0.400 | 18 | 20 | –2 | 3 | 62 |
| 5 | 70 | Maciej Bielec (POL) | D_{1} | D_{3} | D_{1} | D_{3} | | V | 1 | 5 | 0.200 | 13 | 20 | –7 | 5 | 75 |
| 6 | 71 | Gunnar Gräsbeck (FIN) | D_{2} | D_{4} | V | D_{2} | D_{1} | | 1 | 5 | 0.200 | 14 | 24 | –10 | 6 | 76 |

== Ranking Round ==
=== Section 1 ===
Round of 128
80 | Rafael Tulen (NED) | 15
82 | Sándor Cho Taeun (HUN) | 12

Round of 64
2 | Ruslan Eskov (EST) | 11
80 | Rafael Tulen (NED) | 12
54 | Jan Wenglarczyk (POL) | 10
32 | Virgile Marchal (FRA) | 15
17 | Michele Niggeler (SUI) | 7
33 | Gergely Siklósi (HUN) | 15
45 | Yan Sych (UKR) | 12
4 | Alexandre Bardenet (FRA) | 15

Round of 32
80 | Rafael Tulen (NED) | 9
32 | Virgile Marchal (FRA) | 15
33 | Gergely Siklósi (HUN) | 14
4 | Alexandre Bardenet (FRA) | 15

Round of 16
32 | Virgile Marchal (FRA) | 15
4 | Alexandre Bardenet (FRA) | 13

=== Section 2 ===
Round of 128
79 | Antoine El Choueiry (LBN) | 7
57 | Anton Kimfors (SWE) | 15
81 | Kentaro Murayama (JPN) | 10
59 | Nicolas Ferreira (BRA) | 15

Round of 64
7 | Masaru Yamada (JPN) | 15
57 | Anton Kimfors (SWE) | 8
6 | Dmitriy Gusev (RUS) | 15
19 | Volodymyr Stankevych (UKR) | 9
34 | Richard Pokorny (CZE) | 12
26 | Daniel Berta (HUN) | 15
59 | Nicolas Ferreira (BRA) | 10
63 | Gabriel Canaux (USA) | 15

Round of 32
7 | Masaru Yamada (JPN) | 15
6 | Dmitriy Gusev (RUS) | 8
26 | Daniel Berta (HUN) | 14
63 | Gabriel Canaux (USA) | 15

Round of 16
7 | Masaru Yamada (JPN) | 14
63 | Gabriel Canaux (USA) | 11

=== Section 3 ===
Round of 128
59 | Nicolas Poncin (BEL) | 15
21 | Flavio Giannotte (LUX) | 14

Round of 64
15 | Lukas Bellmann (GER) | 15
59 | Nicolas Poncin (BEL) | 9
6 | Dmitriy Alexanin (KAZ) | 12
10 | Anatoliy Herey (UKR) | 15
64 | Justin Yoo (USA) | 15
35 | Jacob Hoyle (USA) | 14
47 | Ivan Deryabin (KAZ) | 14
51 | Roman Svichkar (UKR) | 15

Round of 32
15 | Lukas Bellmann (GER) | 13
10 | Anatoliy Herey (UKR) | 15
64 | Justin Yoo (USA) | 11
51 | Roman Svichkar (UKR) | 12

Round of 16
10 | Anatoliy Herey (UKR) | 15
51 | Roman Svichkar (UKR) | 11

=== Section 4 ===
Round of 128
13 | Chen Tsung-lin (TPE) | 15
93 | Xu Jingjing (CHN) | 5

Round of 64
22 | Tristan Tulen (NED) | 15
61 | Amit Parizat (ISR) | 6
78 | Kim Jae-won (KOR) | 8
20 | Zsombor Bányai (HUN) | 15
38 | Lewis Weiss (USA) | 15
68 | Rufus Panelius (FIN) | 14
13 | Chen Tsung-lin (TPE) | 9
12 | Ido Herpe (ISR) | 15

Round of 32
22 | Tristan Tulen (NED) | 12
20 | Zsombor Bányai (HUN) | 15
38 | Lewis Weiss (USA) | 11
12 | Ido Herpe (ISR) | 15

Round of 16
20 | Zsombor Bányai (HUN) | 15
12 | Ido Herpe (ISR) | 14

=== Section 5 ===
Round of 128
62 | Alexander Korlath (AUT) | 8
43 | Max Rod (POR) | 15

Round of 64
5 | Martin Rubes (CZE) | 15
43 | Max Rod (POR) | 12
29 | Filip Broniszewski (POL) | 15
90 | Pavel Tychler (RSA) | 9
56 | Hwang Hyeon-il (KOR) | 15
28 | Alexis Bayard (SUI) | 8
58 | Teemu Seeve (FIN) | 9
4 | Alexandre Pittet (SUI) | 15

Round of 32
5 | Martin Rubes (CZE) | 13
29 | Filip Broniszewski (POL) | 15
56 | Hwang Hyeon-il (KOR) | 12
4 | Alexandre Pittet (SUI) | 15

Round of 16
29 | Filip Broniszewski (POL) | 15
4 | Alexandre Pittet (SUI) | 13

=== Section 6 ===
Round of 128
18 | Georg Kuhn (SUI) | 15
46 | Vadim Sharlaimov (KAZ) | 12

Round of 64
86 | Valerio Cuomo (ITA) | 12
53 | David van Nunen (NED) | 11
37 | Peeter Turnau (EST) | 12
14 | Alan Fardzinov (RUS) | 10
49 | Ariel Drizin (ISR) | 6
9 | Mathias Biabiany (FRA) | 15
18 | Georg Kuhn (SUI) | 15
1 | Koki Kano (JPN) | 12

Round of 32
86 | Valerio Cuomo (ITA) | 13
37 | Peeter Turnau (EST) | 15
9 | Mathias Biabiany (FRA) | 10
18 | Georg Kuhn (SUI) | 15

Round of 16
37 | Peeter Turnau (EST) | 15
18 | Georg Kuhn (SUI) | 13

=== Section 7 ===
Round of 128
44 | Daniel Marcol (POL) | 11
39 | Bradley Johnston Leyer (CRC) | 15

Round of 64
3 | Richard Schmidt (GER) | 15
39 | Bradley Johnston Leyer (CRC) | 9
40 | Ting Hong-kai (TPE) | 4
94 | Shen Zihao (CHN) | 3
11 | Niko Vuorinen (FIN) | 15
25 | Gabriele Cimini (ITA) | 12
48 | Troels Christian Robl (DEN) | 12
24 | Ryosuke Narita (JPN) | 15

Round of 32
3 | Richard Schmidt (GER) | 14
40 | Ting Hong-kai (TPE) | 15
11 | Niko Vuorinen (FIN) | 15
24 | Ryosuke Narita (JPN) | 7

Round of 16
40 | Ting Hong-kai (TPE) | 10
11 | Niko Vuorinen (FIN) | 15

=== Section 8 ===
Round of 128
41 | Federico Vismara (ITA) | 15
96 | Ye Deze (CHN) | 10

Round of 64
31 | Yuval Shalom Freilich (ISR) | 12
97 | Jang Hyo-min (KOR) | 15
27 | Lorenzo Buzzi (ITA) | 15
41 | Ng Ho Tin (HKG) | 11
30 | Sergey Bida (RUS) | 15
2 | Ruslan Kurbanov (KAZ) | 12
41 | Federico Vismara (ITA) | 9
16 | Jonathan Bonnaire (FRA) | 15

Round of 32
97 | Jang Hyo-min (KOR) | 15
27 | Lorenzo Buzzi (ITA) | 13
30 | Sergey Bida (RUS) | 15
16 | Jonathan Bonnaire (FRA) | 12

Round of 16
97 | Jang Hyo-min (KOR) | 13
30 | Sergey Bida (RUS) | 14

=== Quarterfinals ===
Quarterfinals
17 | Virgile Marchal (FRA) | 10
7 | Masaru Yamada (JPN) | 15
10 | Anatoliy Herey (UKR) | 11
20 | Zsombor Bányai (HUN) | 15
29 | Filip Broniszewski (POL) | 15
37 | Peeter Turnau (EST) | 8
11 | Niko Vuorinen (FIN) | 9
30 | Sergey Bida (RUS) | 15

Semifinals
7 | Masaru Yamada (JPN) | 11
20 | Zsombor Bányai (HUN) | 13
29 | Filip Broniszewski (POL) | 5
30 | Sergey Bida (RUS) | 15

Final
20 | Zsombor Bányai (HUN) | 11
30 | Sergey Bida (RUS) | 15

== Final ranking ==
| Rank | Athlete | Results |
|---|---|---|
| 1st place, gold medalist(s) | Sergey Bida (RUS) | Champion |
| 2nd place, silver medalist(s) | Zsombor Bányai (HUN) | Runner-up |
| 3rd place, bronze medalist(s) | Masaru Yamada (JPN) | Semifinals |
| 3rd place, bronze medalist(s) | Filip Broniszewski (POL) | Semifinals |
| 5 | Niko Vuorinen (FIN) | Quarterfinals |
| 6 | Anatoliy Herey (UKR) | Quarterfinals |
| 7 | Virgile Marchal (FRA) | Quarterfinals |
| 8 | Peeter Turnau (EST) | Quarterfinals |
| 9 | Ido Herpe (ISR) | Round of 16 |
| 10 | Gabriel Canaux (USA) | Round of 16 |
| 11 | Roman Svichkar (UKR) | Round of 16 |
| 12 | Alexandre Pittet (SUI) | Round of 16 |
| 13 | Alexandre Bardenet (FRA) | Round of 16 |
| 14 | Ting Hong-kai (TPE) | Round of 16 |
| 15 | Jang Hyo-min (KOR) | Round of 16 |
| 16 | Georg Kuhn (SUI) | Round of 16 |
| 17 | Jonathan Bonnaire (FRA) | Round of 32 |
| 18 | Martin Rubes (CZE) | Round of 32 |
| 19 | Lukas Bellmann (GER) | Round of 32 |
| 20 | Richard Schmidt (GER) | Round of 32 |
| 21 | Ryosuke Narita (JPN) | Round of 32 |
| 22 | Valerio Cuomo (ITA) | Round of 32 |
| 23 | Tristan Tulen (NED) | Round of 32 |
| 24 | Hwang Hyeon-il (KOR) | Round of 32 |
| 25 | Justin Yoo (USA) | Round of 32 |
| 26 | Lewis Weiss (USA) | Round of 32 |
| 27 | Mathias Biabiany (FRA) | Round of 32 |
| 28 | Daniel Berta (HUN) | Round of 32 |
| 28 | Dmitriy Gusev (RUS) | Round of 32 |
| 30 | Lorenzo Buzzi (ITA) | Round of 32 |
| 31 | Gergely Siklósi (HUN) | Round of 32 |
| 32 | Rafael Tulen (NED) | Round of 32 |
| 33 | Ruslan Eskov (EST) | Round of 64 |
| 34 | Koki Kano (JPN) | Round of 64 |
| 35 | Yuval Shalom Freilich (ISR) | Round of 64 |
| 36 | Michele Niggeler (SUI) | Round of 64 |
| 37 | Ng Ho Tin (HKG) | Round of 64 |
| 38 | Alan Fardzinov (RUS) | Round of 64 |
| 39 | Volodymyr Stankevych (UKR) | Round of 64 |
| 40 | Richard Pokorny (CZE) | Round of 64 |
| 41 | Shen Zihao (CHN) | Round of 64 |
| 42 | Ariel Drizin (ISR) | Round of 64 |
| 43 | Pavel Tychler (RSA) | Round of 64 |
| 44 | Jan Wenglarczyk (POL) | Round of 64 |
| 45 | Ruslan Kurbanov (KAZ) | Round of 64 |
| 46 | Rufus Panelius (FIN) | Round of 64 |
| 47 | Dmitriy Alexanin (KAZ) | Round of 64 |
| 48 | Gabriele Cimini (ITA) | Round of 64 |
| 49 | Jacob Hoyle (USA) | Round of 64 |
| 49 | Kim Jae-won (KOR) | Round of 64 |
| 51 | Alexis Bayard (SUI) | Round of 64 |
| 52 | Yan Sych (UKR) | Round of 64 |
| 53 | Teemu Seeve (FIN) | Round of 64 |
| 54 | Amit Parizat (ISR) | Round of 64 |
| 55 | Ivan Deryabin (KAZ) | Round of 64 |
| 56 | David van Nunen (NED) | Round of 64 |
| 57 | Troels Christian Robl (DEN) | Round of 64 |
| 57 | Anton Kimfors (SWE) | Round of 64 |
| 59 | Bradley Johnston Leyer (CRC) | Round of 64 |
| 60 | Chen Tsung-lin (TPE) | Round of 64 |
| 61 | Max Rod (POR) | Round of 64 |
| 62 | Federico Vismara (ITA) | Round of 64 |
| 63 | Nicolas Poncin (BEL) | Round of 64 |
| 64 | Nicolas Ferreira (BRA) | Round of 64 |
| 65 | Kentaro Murayama (JPN) | Round of 128 |
| 66 | Flavio Giannotte (LUX) | Round of 128 |
| 67 | Sándor Cho Taeun (HUN) | Round of 128 |
| 68 | Ye Deze (CHN) | Round of 128 |
| 69 | Alexander Korlath (AUT) | Round of 128 |
| 70 | Xu Jingjing (CHN) | Round of 128 |
| 71 | Vadim Sharlaimov (KAZ) | Round of 128 |
| 72 | Daniel Marcol (POL) | Round of 128 |
| 73 | Antoine El Choueiry (LBN) | Round of 128 |
| 74 | Pankaj Kumar Sharma (IND) | Round of Pools |
| 75 | Maciej Bielec (POL) | Round of Pools |
| 76 | Gunnar Gräsbeck (FIN) | Round of Pools |
| 77 | Georgiy Bruev (RUS) | Round of Pools |
| 78 | Alexander Riedel (GER) | Round of Pools |
| 79 | Wu Yu-ting (TPE) | Round of Pools |
| 80 | Akshay Manoharan Sajitha (IND) | Round of Pools |
| 81 | Pak Min-woo (KOR) | Round of Pools |
| 82 | Nikolaus Bodoczi (GER) | Round of Pools |
| 83 | Wong Tsz Ho (HKG) | Round of Pools |
| 84 | Chuang Po-yu (TPE) | Round of Pools |
| 85 | Max Korlinge (SWE) | Round of Pools |
| 86 | José Bartissol (POR) | Round of Pools |
| 87 | Henrik Jarl (SWE) | Round of Pools |
| 88 | Serge Mes (NED) | Round of Pools |
| 89 | Bat-Erdene Erdenebat (MGL) | Round of Pools |
| 90 | Jan Szalay (SVK) | Round of Pools |
| 91 | Dulguun Enkhtsogt (MGL) | Round of Pools |
| 92 | Jan Cipar (SVK) | Round of Pools |
| 93 | Amarbold Batsuren (MGL) | Round of Pools |
| 94 | Ip Yuan Chang (SGP) | Round of Pools |
| 94 | Jigjidsuren Tsoggerel (MGL) | Round of Pools |
| 96 | Vir Sangram Singh (IND) | Round of Pools |
| 96 | Tushar Ravsaheb Aher (IND) | Round of Pools |
