= 2025–26 Fencing World Cup =

International fencing competition

- Edition: 55th Fencing World Cup
- Duration: October 2025 – May 2026
- Organiser: FIE

The 55th FIE Fencing World Cup event began in October 2025 and will conclude in May 2026.

== Senior ==
=== Men's individual épée ===
Color key

- World Cup

Date	Event	Type	Gold	Silver	Bronze
5 December 2025	Coupe du Monde, Vancouver	World Cup	Mohamed El-Sayed (EGY)	Dov Ber Vilensky (ISR)	Matteo Galassi (ITA); Gergely Siklósi (HUN)
9 January 2026	Coupe du Monde, Fujairah	World Cup	Conrad Seibaek Kongstad (DEN)	Matteo Galassi (ITA)	Alexis Bayard (SUI); Mate Tamas Koch (HUN)
5 February 2026	Coupe du Monde, Heidenheim	World Cup	Ruslan Kurbanov (KAZ)	Davide Di Veroli (ITA)	Mohamed El-Sayed (EGY); Tristan Tulen (NED)
26 March 2026	Coupe du Monde, Astana	World Cup	Roman Svichkar (UKR)	Ruslan Kurbanov (KAZ)	Mohamed El-Sayed (EGY); David Nagy (HUN)
22 May 2026	Coupe du Monde, Berne	World Cup	Mohamed El-Sayed (EGY)	Tibor Andrasfi (HUN)	Alexandre Camargo (BRA); Jakub Jurka (CZE)

=== Women's individual épée ===
Color key

- World Cup

Date	Event	Type	Gold	Silver	Bronze
5 December 2025	Coupe du Monde, Vancouver	World Cup	Giulia Rizzi (ITA)	Marie-Florence Candassamy (FRA)	Lim Tae-hee [sv] (KOR); Eszter Muhari (HUN)
8 January 2026	Coupe du Monde, Fujairah	World Cup	Marie-Florence Candassamy (FRA)	Alberta Santuccio (ITA)	Hadley Husisian (USA); Lee Hye-in (KOR)
6 February 2026	Coupe du Monde, Wuxi	World Cup	Giulia Rizzi (ITA)	Alberta Santuccio (ITA)	Rossella Fiamingo (ITA); Tang Junyao (CHN)
27 March 2026	Coupe du Monde, Astana	World Cup	Song Se-ra (KOR)	Katrina Lehis (EST)	Alberta Santuccio (ITA); Diane Von Kerssenbrock (FRA)
22 May 2026	Coupe du Monde, St-Maur	World Cup	Alberta Santuccio (ITA)	Hadley Husisian (USA)	Lim Tae-hee (KOR); Yang Jingwen (CHN)

=== Men's individual foil ===
Color key

- World Cup

Date	Event	Type	Gold	Silver	Bronze
7 November 2025	Coupe du Monde, Palma de Mallorca	World Cup	Alexander Choupenitch (CZE)	Gergo Szemes (HUN)	Guillaume Bianchi (ITA); Tommaso Martini (ITA)
5 December 2025	Coupe du Monde, Fukuoka	World Cup	Choi Chun Yin Ryan (HKG)	Kirill Borodachev (AIN)	Giulio Lombardi (ITA); Alexander Massialas (USA)
9 January 2026	Coupe du Monde, Paris	World Cup	Alexander Massialas (USA)	Choi Chun Yin Ryan (HKG)	Guillaume Bianchi (ITA); Giulio Lombardi (ITA)
16 April 2026	Coupe du Monde, Cairo	World Cup	Kazuki Iimura (JPN)	Alexander Choupenitch (CZE)	Anas Anane (FRA); Nick Itkin (USA)
30 April 2026	Coupe du Monde, Istanbul	World Cup	Filippo Macchi (ITA)	Egor Barannikov (AIN)	Giuseppe Franzoni (ITA); Tommaso Marini (ITA)

=== Women's individual foil ===
Color key

- World Cup

Date	Event	Type	Gold	Silver	Bronze
6 November 2025	Coupe du Monde, Palma de Mallorca	World Cup	Martina Favaretto (ITA)	Yuka Ueno (JPN)	Eleanor Harvey (CAN); Komaki Kikuchi (JPN)
6 December 2025	Coupe du Monde, Busan	World Cup	Martina Batini (ITA)	Yuka Ueno (JPN)	Martina Favaretto (ITA); Lauren Scruggs (USA)
9 January 2026	Coupe du Monde, Hong Kong	World Cup	Lee Kiefer (USA)	Francesca Palumbo (ITA)	Marta Martyanova (AIN); Morgane Patru (FRA)
17 April 2026	Coupe du Monde, Cairo	World Cup	Martina Favaretto (ITA)	Martina Batini (ITA)	Sera Azuma (JPN); Marta Jakubowska (POL)
1 May 2026	Coupe du Monde, Istanbul	World Cup	Martina Favaretto (ITA)	Arianna Errigo (ITA)	Vladislava Peniushkina (AIN); Pauline Ranvier (FRA)

=== Men's individual sabre ===
Color key

- World Cup

Date	Event	Type	Gold	Silver	Bronze
6 November 2025	Coupe du Monde, Algiers	World Cup	Colin Heathcock (USA)	Fares Ferjani (TUN)	Oh Sang-uk (KOR); Sebastien Patrice (FRA)
23 January 2026	Coupe du Monde, Salt Lake City	World Cup	Oh Sang-uk (KOR)	Mao Kokubo (JPN)	Cosimo Bertini (ITA); Ziad Elsissy (EGY)
27 March 2026	Coupe du Monde, Budapest	World Cup	William Morrill (USA)	Matteo Neri (ITA)	Sebastien Patrice (FRA); Aron Szilagyi (HUN)
17 April 2026	Coupe du Monde, Padua	World Cup	Kamil Ibragimov (AIN)	Pavel Graudyn (AIN)	Do Gyeong-dong (KOR); Maxime Pianfetti (FRA)
22 May 2026	Coupe du Monde, Cairo	World Cup	Oh Sang-uk (KOR)	Colin Heathcock (USA)	Sandro Bazadze (GEO); Frederic Kindler (GER)

=== Women's individual sabre ===
Color key

- World Cup

Date	Event	Type	Gold	Silver	Bronze
7 November 2025	Coupe du Monde, Algiers	World Cup	Jeon Ha-young (KOR)	Sugár Katinka Battai (HUN)	Alina Mikhailova (AIN); Yoana Ilieva (BUL)
22 January 2026	Coupe du Monde, Salt Lake City	World Cup	Sarah Noutcha (FRA)	Misaki Emura (JPN)	Michela Battiston (ITA); Yana Egorian (AIN)
27 March 2026	Coupe du Monde, Tashkent	World Cup	Alina Mikhailova (AIN)	Yoana Ilieva (BUL)	Palina Kaspiarovich (AZE); Rao Xueyi (CHN)
17 April 2026	Coupe du Monde, Athènes	World Cup	Sugar Katinka Battai (HUN)	Yana Egorian (AIN)	Luca Szucs (HUN); Alina Komashchuk (UKR)
22 May 2026	Coupe du Monde, Lima	World Cup	Sarah Noutcha (FRA)	Choi Se-bin (KOR)	Sugár Katinka Battai (HUN); Yana Egorian (AIN)

=== Men's team épée ===
Color key

- World Cup

Date	Event	Type	Gold	Silver	Bronze
7 December 2025	Coupe du Monde par équipes, Vancouver	World Cup	Switzerland	France	Hungary
11 January 2026	Coupe du Monde par équipes, Fujairah	World Cup	Switzerland	Italy	Netherlands
7 February 2026	Coupe du Monde par équipes, Heidenheim	World Cup	France	South Korea	Netherlands
29 March 2026	Coupe du Monde par équipes, Astana	World Cup	France	Italy	Japan
24 May 2026	Coupe du Monde par équipes, Berne	World Cup	Switzerland	Italy	France

=== Women's team épée ===
Color key

- World Cup

Date	Event	Type	Gold	Silver	Bronze
7 December 2025	Coupe du Monde par équipes, Vancouver	World Cup	Estonia	Hungary	Italy
11 January 2026	Coupe du Monde par équipes, Fujairah	World Cup	United States	South Korea	Estonia
8 February 2026	Coupe du Monde par équipes, Wuxi	World Cup	China	South Korea	Italy
29 March 2026	Coupe du Monde par équipes, Astana	World Cup	South Korea	United States	Italy
24 May 2026	Coupe du Monde par équipes, St-Maur	World Cup	South Korea	Individual Neutral Athletes	Hungary

=== Men's team foil ===
Color key

- World Cup

Date	Event	Type	Gold	Silver	Bronze
9 November 2025	Coupe du Monde par équipes, Palma de Mallorca	World Cup	Individual Neutral Athletes	Italy	Hungary
7 December 2025	Coupe du Monde par équipes, Fukuoka	World Cup	Italy	France	Japan
11 January 2026	Coupe du Monde par équipes, Paris	World Cup	Hong Kong	United States	Japan
19 April 2026	Coupe du Monde par équipes, Cairo	World Cup	Italy	Hong Kong	United States
3 May 2026	Coupe du Monde par équipes, Istanbul	World Cup	Italy	France	Hong Kong

=== Women's team foil ===
Color key

- World Cup

Date	Event	Type	Gold	Silver	Bronze
9 November 2025	Coupe du Monde par équipes, Palma de Mallorca	World Cup	Italy	United States	France
7 December 2025	Coupe du Monde par équipes, Busan	World Cup	Italy	United States	Japan
11 January 2026	Coupe du Monde par équipes, Hong Kong	World Cup	Italy	France	United States
19 April 2026	Coupe du Monde par équipes, Cairo	World Cup	Italy	France	United States
3 May 2026	Coupe du Monde par équipes, Istanbul	World Cup	Italy	Spain	Japan

=== Men's team sabre ===
Color key

- World Cup

Date	Event	Type	Gold	Silver	Bronze
9 November 2025	Coupe du Monde par équipes, Algiers	World Cup	France	Romania	Japan
25 January 2026	Coupe du Monde par équipes, Salt Lake City	World Cup	South Korea	United States	Poland
29 March 2026	Coupe du Monde par équipes, Budapest	World Cup	France	Romania	South Korea
19 April 2026	Coupe du Monde par équipes, Padua	World Cup	South Korea	Individual Neutral Athletes	Hungary
24 May 2026	Coupe du Monde par équipes, Cairo	World Cup	France	Hungary	South Korea

=== Women's team sabre ===
Color key

- World Cup

Date	Event	Type	Gold	Silver	Bronze
9 November 2025	Coupe du Monde par équipes, Algiers	World Cup	South Korea	Hungary	France
25 January 2026	Coupe du Monde par équipes, Salt Lake City	World Cup	France	South Korea	China
29 March 2026	Coupe du Monde par équipes, Tashkent	World Cup	Individual Neutral Athletes	United States	Japan
19 April 2026	Coupe du Monde par équipes, Athènes	World Cup	France	South Korea	Japan
24 May 2026	Coupe du Monde par équipes, Lima	World Cup	Individual Neutral Athletes	France	Hungary

== Junior ==
=== Men's individual épée ===
Color key

- World Cup

Date	Event	Type	Gold	Silver	Bronze
31 October 2025	Coupe du Monde, San Salvador	World Cup	Kruz Schembri (ISV)	Alexander Bezrodnov (USA)	Jonathan Wu (USA); Simon Lioznyansky (USA)
15 November 2025	Coupe du Monde, San José	World Cup	Kruz Schembri (ISV)	Artemios Tzovanis (GRE)	Nurzhan Abzhanov (KAZ); Erick Galvan (MEX)
29 November 2025	Coupe du Monde, Hong Kong	World Cup	Szymon Wojciechowski (POL)	Christopher Chong (USA)	Chen Bing-Jyun (TPE); Mark Horvath (HUN)
13 December 2025	Coupe du Monde, Tashkent	World Cup	Kirill Prokhodov (KAZ)	Chen Bing Jyun (TPE)	Eslam Osama (EGY); Kamronbek Ismoilov (UZB)
3 January 2026	Coupe du Monde, Basel	World Cup	Bence Taivainen (HUN)	Nicholas Zhang (CAN)	Michael Bezrodnov (USA); Simon Lioznyansky (USA)
16 January 2026	Coupe du Monde, Manama	World Cup	Arkadii Kardava (RUS)	Chen Bing Jyun (TPE)	Aina Rahamefy (FRA); Roman Selyutin (RUS)
31 January 2026	Coupe du Monde, Cairo	World Cup	Odinn Bindas (FRA)	James Sennewald (USA)	Bence Balazs (HUN); Youssef Shamel (EGY)
14 February 2026	Coupe du Monde, Vrsac	World Cup	Mate Antal (HUN)	Mikolaj Adamczyk (POL)	Riccardo Gera (ITA); Stefan Popa (ROU)

=== Women's individual épée ===
Color key

- World Cup

Date	Event	Type	Gold	Silver	Bronze
31 October 2025	Coupe du Monde, San Salvador	World Cup	Julia Yin (CAN)	Hailin Chen (HKG)	Sofia Echeverry (COL); Vivienne Lee Man Wai (HKG)
15 November 2025	Coupe du Monde, San José	World Cup	Hailin Chen (HKG)	Linnea Eriksson (SWE)	Barbara Columba Ocegueda Velasco (MEX); Laura Correia (BRA)
28 November 2025	Coupe du Monde, Hong Kong	World Cup	Kyle Fallon (USA)	Elle Meihui Koh (SGP)	Hung Li-Hsiang (TPE); Rubeen Rembi (FRA)
13 December 2025	Coupe du Monde, Burgos	World Cup	Leehi Machulsky (USA)	Greta Gachalyi (HUN)	Natalya Cafasso (USA); Julia Trynova (EST)
5 January 2026	Coupe du Monde, Udine	World Cup	Regina Lee (USA)	Xinyao Li (CHN)	Natalya Cafasso (USA); Xinyi Liang (CHN)
17 January 2026	Coupe du Monde, Manama	World Cup	Elle Meihui Koh (SGP)	Farah Mahfouz (EGY)	Astasia Cheredintseva (RUS); Lilana Cherchesova (RUS)
30 January 2026	Coupe du Monde, Cairo	World Cup	Jolie Korfonta (USA)	Natalya Cafasso (USA)	Greta Gachalyi (HUN); Blanka Virag Nagy (HUN)
13 February 2026	Coupe du Monde, Hangzhou	World Cup	Zhang Anxin (CHN)	Jiang Huishuang (CHN)	Zhao Yan (CHN); Ariel Lin (TPE)

=== Men's individual foil ===
Color key

- World Cup

Date	Event	Type	Gold	Silver	Bronze
31 October 2025	Coupe du Monde, Istanbul	World Cup	Emanuele Iaquinta (ITA)	Mattia De Cristofaro (ITA)	Lin Youlong (CHN); Luao Yang (USA)
14 November 2025	Coupe du Monde, Lima	World Cup	Mattia Rubin (HUN)	Maximo Azuela (MEX)	Andor Zsogon (HUN); Zoltan Gergely (HUN)
29 November 2025	Coupe du Monde, Samorin	World Cup	Roy Graham (USA)	Emanuele Iaquinta (ITA)	Liam Bas (USA); Mattia De Cristofaro (ITA)
13 December 2025	Coupe du Monde, Bangkok	World Cup	Joseph Glasson (AUS)	Borys Budovskyi (CAN)	Dmitrii Chashchin (AIN); Samuel Elijah Robson (SGP)
3 January 2026	Coupe du Monde, Fujairah	World Cup	Abdelrahman Tolba (EGY)	Tian Gao (CHN)	Timofey Semyonov (KAZ); Joseph Glasson (AUS)
17 January 2026	Coupe du Monde, Madrid	World Cup	Takushin Tanaka (JPN)	Emanuele Iaquinta (ITA)	Riccardo Sisinni (USA); Daniel Wong Chit (HKG)
30 January 2026	Coupe du Monde, Hammamet	World Cup	Amir Fakhretdinov (RUS)	Rostislav Khamdamov (RUS)	Elia Pasin (ITA); Emanuele Iaquinta (ITA)
13 February 2026	Coupe du Monde, San José	World Cup	Sebastian R. Garcia (PUR)	Cristian Porras (GUA)	Faris Alblooshi (UAE); Alejandro Lorenzo Pereira (ESP)

=== Women's individual foil ===
Color key

- World Cup

Date	Event	Type	Gold	Silver	Bronze
1 November 2025	Coupe du Monde, Istanbul	World Cup	Jaelyn Liu (USA)	Luo Ziyue (CHN)	Katerina Lung (USA); Milana Levchuk (AIN)
15 November 2025	Coupe du Monde, Lima	World Cup	Adeline Senic (MDA)	Aileen Mi (USA)	Zhou Xinyao (HUN); Astrid Bravo (PER)
28 November 2025	Coupe du Monde, Samorin	World Cup	Adeline Senic (MDA)	Jaelyn Liu (USA)	Jazmin Papp (HUN); Alessandra Tavola (ITA)
14 December 2025	Coupe du Monde, Bangkok	World Cup	Jaelyn Liu (USA)	Stefania Chasovnikova (AIN)	Zhaoyi Liu (USA); Jiao Enqi (CHN)
2 January 2026	Coupe du Monde, Fujairah	World Cup	Stefania Chasovnikova (RUS)	Sofiya Aktayeva (KAZ)	Beini Hu (CHN); Leung Nga Wun (HKG)
17 January 2026	Coupe du Monde, Tbilisi	World Cup	Caterina Fedeli (USA)	Linlin Zhu (CHN)	Gili Kuritzky (ISR); Jazmin Papp (HUN)
31 January 2026	Coupe du Monde, Hammamet	World Cup	Greta Collini (ITA)	Keren Aye (FRA)	Irina Zorina (RUS); Greta Saloni (ITA)
14 February 2026	Coupe du Monde, San José	World Cup	Nadia Zeldin (USA)	Milena Zunic (SRB)	Charlotte Peng (TPE); Sloane Elizabeth Paulus (PHI)

=== Men's individual sabre ===
Color key

- World Cup

Date	Event	Type	Gold	Silver	Bronze
1 November 2025	Coupe du Monde, Busan	World Cup	Lee June-hee (KOR)	Kim Ji-hwan (KOR)	Osuke Kawano (JPN); Silas Choi (USA)
15 November 2025	Coupe du Monde, Tashkent	World Cup	Furkan Yaman (TUR)	Kiram Iarullin (AIN)	Emilian Strzadala (POL); Ivan Novikov (AIN)
28 November 2025	Coupe du Monde, Hammamet	World Cup	Furkan Yaman (TUR)	Leonardo Reale (ITA)	Moritz Schenkel (GER); Maximilien Tori (FRA)
13 December 2025	Coupe du Monde, Dormagen	World Cup	Ahmed Hesham (EGY)	Oszkar Vajda (HUN)	Zalan Szalai (HUN); Furkan Yaman (TUR)
3 January 2026	Coupe du Monde, Bogotá	World Cup	Furkan Yaman (TUR)	Yao Jintao (CHN)	Marcus Pinto (BRA); Oszkar Vajda (HUN)
16 January 2026	Coupe du Monde, Boston	World Cup	Leonardo Reale (ITA)	Emilio Paturzo Gonzalez (USA)	Edoardo Reale (ITA); Matteo Ottaviani (ITA)
31 January 2026	Coupe du Monde, Plovdiv	World Cup	Pavel Graudyn (RUS)	Leonardo Reale (ITA)	Tom Couderc (FRA); Aleksandre Tavartkiladze (GEO)
13 February 2026	Coupe du Monde, Dakar	World Cup	Furkan Yaman (TUR)	Nathan Munguia (MEX)	Adham Shalaby (EGY); Daniel Tiagi (CAN)

=== Women's individual sabre ===
Color key

- World Cup

Date	Event	Type	Gold	Silver	Bronze
31 October 2025	Coupe du Monde, Busan	World Cup	Xuanyi Zhang (USA)	Tsang Yuet Ching (HKG)	Martina Fernandez (USA); Mitsuki Suto (JPN)
14 November 2025	Coupe du Monde, Tashkent	World Cup	Karina Tallada (AIN)	Ayakoz Jumamuratova (UZB)	Boglarka Komjathy (HUN); Gabriela Wojcik (POL)
29 November 2025	Coupe du Monde, Hammamet	World Cup	Sophie Liu (USA)	Vittoria Mocci (ITA)	Elisabetta Borrelli (ITA); Alla Aidarova (AIN)
13 December 2025	Coupe du Monde, Budapest	World Cup	Brynnley Mckee (USA)	Csenge Konya (HUN)	Emese Domonkos (HUN); Elisabetta Borrelli (ITA)
3 January 2026	Coupe du Monde, Bogotá	World Cup	Gabriela Maria Lin Hwang (PUR)	Ana Beatriz Fraga (BRA)	Sarah Benitez Silva (VEN); Paulina Garcia (MEX)
16 January 2026	Coupe du Monde, Boston	World Cup	Emese Domonkos (HUN)	Natalie Tsui (USA)	Martina Fernandez (USA); Valentina Chiarelli (USA)
31 January 2026	Coupe du Monde, Tbilisi	World Cup	Alexandra Kuvaeva (GEO)	Amalia Covaliu (ROU)	Sofia Novikova (RUS); Carmen Wullus (FRA)
14 February 2026	Coupe du Monde, Dakar	World Cup	Khadija Aboualam (EGY)	Nagwa Nofal (EGY)	Camila Vieira (BRA); Aicha Bouajina (TUN)

=== Men's team épée ===
Color key

- World Cup

Date	Event	Type	Gold	Silver	Bronze
2 November 2025	Coupe du Monde par équipes, San Salvador	World Cup	United States	Canada	Saudi Arabia
16 November 2025	Coupe du Monde par équipes, San José	World Cup	Greece	Brazil	Panama
30 November 2025	Coupe du Monde par équipes, Hong Kong	World Cup	Egypt	China	Hungary
14 December 2025	Coupe du Monde par équipes, Tashkent	World Cup	Egypt	Greece	Uzbekistan
4 January 2026	Coupe du Monde par équipes, Basel	World Cup	Israel	Hungary	France
18 January 2026	Coupe du Monde par équipes, Manama	World Cup	France	Russia	Hong Kong
1 February 2026	Coupe du Monde par équipes, Cairo	World Cup	Hungary	Germany	United States
15 February 2026	Coupe du Monde par équipes, Vrsac	World Cup	France	Italy	Hong Kong

=== Women's team épée ===
Color key

- World Cup

Date	Event	Type	Gold	Silver	Bronze
2 November 2025	Coupe du Monde par équipes, San Salvador	World Cup	Canada	Puerto Rico	Mexico
16 November 2025	Coupe du Monde par équipes, San José	World Cup	Mexico	Chile	Colombia
30 November 2025	Coupe du Monde par équipes, Hong Kong	World Cup	France	Poland	Individual Neutral Athletes
14 December 2025	Coupe du Monde par équipes, Burgos	World Cup	Ukraine	United States	Spain
6 January 2026	Coupe du Monde par équipes, Udine	World Cup	China	United States	Ukraine
18 January 2026	Coupe du Monde par équipes, Manama	World Cup	Turkey	Hong Kong	Russia
1 February 2026	Coupe du Monde par équipes, Cairo	World Cup	Hungary	Italy	China
14 February 2026	Coupe du Monde par équipes, Hangzhou	World Cup	Japan	China	Hong Kong

=== Men's team foil ===
Color key

- World Cup

Date	Event	Type	Gold	Silver	Bronze
2 November 2025	Coupe du Monde par équipes, Istanbul	World Cup	Italy	Hong Kong	United States
16 November 2025	Coupe du Monde par équipes, Lima	World Cup	Hungary	Mexico	Egypt
30 November 2025	Coupe du Monde par équipes, Šamorín	World Cup	Italy	China	France
15 December 2025	Coupe du Monde par équipes, Bangkok	World Cup	China	Japan	France
4 January 2026	Coupe du Monde par équipes, Fujairah	World Cup	China	Egypt	Singapore
18 January 2026	Coupe du Monde par équipes, Madrid	World Cup	Hong Kong	United Kingdom	China
1 February 2026	Coupe du Monde par équipes, Hammamet	World Cup	Russia	United Kingdom	Hong Kong
15 February 2026	Coupe du Monde par équipes, San José	World Cup	Guatemala	Chile	Costa Rica

=== Women's team foil ===
Color key

- World Cup

Date	Event	Type	Gold	Silver	Bronze
2 November 2025	Coupe du Monde par équipes, Istanbul	World Cup	Italy	Hungary	United States
16 November 2025	Coupe du Monde par équipes, Lima	World Cup	Hungary	Peru	Brazil
30 November 2025	Coupe du Monde par équipes, Šamorín	World Cup	Moldova	Individual Neutral Athletes	Hungary
15 December 2025	Coupe du Monde par équipes, Bangkok	World Cup	United States	China	Israel
4 January 2026	Coupe du Monde par équipes, Fujairah	World Cup	Israel	Australia	China
18 January 2026	Coupe du Monde par équipes, Tbilisi	World Cup	Italy	United States	Russia
1 February 2026	Coupe du Monde par équipes, Hammamet	World Cup	Russia	France	Hong Kong
15 February 2026	Coupe du Monde par équipes, San José	World Cup	Mexico	Brazil	Guatemala

=== Men's team sabre ===
Color key

- World Cup

Date	Event	Type	Gold	Silver	Bronze
2 November 2025	Coupe du Monde par équipes, Busan	World Cup	South Korea	United States	Japan
16 November 2025	Coupe du Monde par équipes, Tashkent	World Cup	Hungary	Kazakhstan	Turkey
30 November 2025	Coupe du Monde par équipes, Hammamet	World Cup	Italy	Turkey	Individual Neutral Athletes
14 December 2025	Coupe du Monde par équipes, Dormagen	World Cup	Italy	Turkey	United States
4 January 2026	Coupe du Monde par équipes, Bogotá	World Cup	Brazil	China	Canada
18 January 2026	Coupe du Monde par équipes, Boston	World Cup	United States	Italy	France
1 February 2026	Coupe du Monde par équipes, Plovdiv	World Cup	Russia	Italy	Bulgaria
15 February 2026	Coupe du Monde par équipes, Dakar	World Cup	Egypt	Algeria	Iran

=== Women's team sabre ===
Color key

- World Cup

Date	Event	Type	Gold	Silver	Bronze
2 November 2025	Coupe du Monde par équipes, Busan	World Cup	United States	Uzbekistan	Japan
16 November 2025	Coupe du Monde par équipes, Tashkent	World Cup	Individual Neutral Athletes	Kazakhstan	Romania
30 November 2025	Coupe du Monde par équipes, Hammamet	World Cup	Italy	France	Romania
14 December 2025	Coupe du Monde par équipes, Budapest	World Cup	Italy	Germany	Uzbekistan
4 January 2026	Coupe du Monde par équipes, Bogotá	World Cup	Brazil	Mexico	Venezuela
18 January 2026	Coupe du Monde par équipes, Boston	World Cup	United States	France	Canada
1 February 2026	Coupe du Monde par équipes, Tbilisi	World Cup	Russia	Uzbekistan	Georgia
15 February 2026	Coupe du Monde par équipes, Dakar	World Cup	Tunisia	Senegal	Algeria
