= Men's épée at the 2018 World Fencing Championships =

- Venue: Wuxi Sports Center Indoor Stadium
- Location: Wuxi, China
- Dates: 20 July (qualification); 23 July
- Competitors: 179 from 70 nations

Medalists
gold medal	Yannick Borel	France
silver medal	Rubén Limardo	Venezuela
bronze medal	Bohdan Nikishyn	Ukraine
bronze medal	Roman Svichkar	Ukraine

The men's épée event of the 2018 World Fencing Championships was held on 23 July 2018. The qualification was held on 20 July 2018.

== Draw ==
=== Finals ===
Semifinals
(Ukraine) Bohdan Nikishyn	4
(Venezuela) Rubén Limardo	7
(France) Yannick Borel	15
(Ukraine) Roman Svichkar	11

Final
(Venezuela) Rubén Limardo	4
(France) Yannick Borel	15

=== Top half ===
==== Section 1 ====
Round of 64
(Ukraine) Bohdan Nikishyn	10
(United States) Jacob Hoyle	8
(Spain) Yulen Pereira	15
(Venezuela) Grabiel Lugo	12
(Canada) Marc-Antoine Blais-Belanger	15
(France) Aymerick Gally	8
(Hong Kong) Fong Hoi Sun	7
(South Korea) Park Kyoung-doo	15
(Hungary) András Rédli	12
(Switzerland) Alexis Bayard	15
(South Korea) Kweon Young-jun	15
(United States) Dennis Kraft	10
(Egypt) Ahmed El-Sayed	10
(Germany) Marco Brinkmann	15
(United States) Curtis McDowald	15
(Germany) Richard Schmidt	8

Round of 32
(Ukraine) Bohdan Nikishyn	15
(Spain) Yulen Pereira	8
(Canada) Marc-Antoine Blais-Belanger	8
(South Korea) Park Kyoung-doo	7
(Switzerland) Alexis Bayard	9
(South Korea) Kweon Young-jun	11
(Germany) Marco Brinkmann	6
(United States) Curtis McDowald	15

Round of 16
(Ukraine) Bohdan Nikishyn	15
(Canada) Marc-Antoine Blais-Belanger	6
(South Korea) Kweon Young-jun	6
(United States) Curtis McDowald	15

Quarterfinals
(Ukraine) Bohdan Nikishyn	15
(United States) Curtis McDowald	10

==== Section 2 ====
Round of 64
(Switzerland) Max Heinzer	11
(France) Alex Fava	12
(Poland) Mateusz Nycz	15
(Estonia) Sten Priinits	14
(Russia) Sergey Bida	9
(Kazakhstan) Elmir Alimzhanov	10
(Egypt) Ahmad El-Sokkary	8
(Venezuela) Rubén Limardo	15
(Italy) Andrea Santarelli	15
(China) Xue Yangdong	4
(Colombia) Jhon Édison Rodríguez	11
(Russia) Sergey Khodos	15
(Denmark) Frederik von der Osten	13
(Russia) Nikita Glazkov	9
(Germany) Lukas Bellmann	12
(South Korea) Park Sang-young	15

Round of 32
(France) Alex Fava	15
(Poland) Mateusz Nycz	9
(Kazakhstan) Elmir Alimzhanov	12
(Venezuela) Rubén Limardo	14
(Italy) Andrea Santarelli	8
(Russia) Sergey Khodos	9
(Denmark) Frederik von der Osten	11
(South Korea) Park Sang-young	15

Round of 16
(France) Alex Fava	8
(Venezuela) Rubén Limardo	15
(Russia) Sergey Khodos	10
(South Korea) Park Sang-young	15

Quarterfinals
(Venezuela) Rubén Limardo	13
(South Korea) Park Sang-young	10

=== Bottom half ===
==== Section 3 ====
Round of 64
(South Korea) Jung Jin-sun	13
(Spain) Álvaro Ibáñez	15
(Israel) Ido Herpe	12
(Netherlands) Tristan Tulen	11
(Kazakhstan) Dmitriy Alexanin	15
(Hungary) Zsombor Bányai	12
(Italy) Enrico Garozzo	4
(Italy) Marco Fichera	15
(Japan) Koki Kano	15
(Finland) Jaakko Paavolainen	14
(Portugal) Ricardo Candeias	15
(Kazakhstan) Ruslan Kurbanov	11
(France) Ronan Gustin
(Israel) Grigori Beskin	w/o
(Vietnam) Nguyễn Phước Đến	8
(France) Yannick Borel	15

Round of 32
(Spain) Álvaro Ibáñez	9
(Israel) Ido Herpe	15
(Kazakhstan) Dmitriy Alexanin	5
(Italy) Marco Fichera	4
(Japan) Koki Kano	15
(Portugal) Ricardo Candeias	9
(Israel) Grigori Beskin	14
(France) Yannick Borel	15

Round of 16
(Israel) Ido Herpe	14
(Kazakhstan) Dmitriy Alexanin	15
(Japan) Koki Kano	14
(France) Yannick Borel	15

Quarterfinals
(Kazakhstan) Dmitriy Alexanin	5
(France) Yannick Borel	15

==== Section 4 ====
Round of 64
(Italy) Paolo Pizzo	15
(South Africa) Pavel Tychler	6
(Ukraine) Roman Svichkar	15
(Estonia) Peeter Turnau	3
(Poland) Radosław Zawrotniak	15
(Hungary) Dániel Berta	12
(Uzbekistan) Fayzulla Alimov	15
(Argentina) Jesús Lugones	10
(Japan) Kazuyasu Minobe	3
(Israel) Yuval Freilich	4
(Spain) Manuel Bargues	15
(Poland) Mateusz Antkiewicz	14
(Venezuela) Jesús Limardo	13
(Switzerland) Benjamin Steffen	15
(Vietnam) Nguyễn Tiến Nhật	15
(Estonia) Nikolai Novosjolov	14

Round of 32
(Italy) Paolo Pizzo	14
(Ukraine) Roman Svichkar	15
(Poland) Radosław Zawrotniak	14
(Uzbekistan) Fayzulla Alimov	15
(Israel) Yuval Freilich	15
(Spain) Manuel Bargues	11
(Switzerland) Benjamin Steffen	15
(Vietnam) Nguyễn Tiến Nhật	8

Round of 16
(Ukraine) Roman Svichkar	15
(Uzbekistan) Fayzulla Alimov	14
(Israel) Yuval Freilich	10
(Switzerland) Benjamin Steffen	15

Quarterfinals
(Ukraine) Roman Svichkar	15
(Switzerland) Benjamin Steffen	12
