= Guillaume Bianchi =

Italian fencer (born 1997)

Personal information
- Born: 30 July 1997 (age 29) Rome, Italy

Sport
- Country: Italy
- Sport: Fencing
- Club: G.S. Fiamme Gialle
Medal record
Men's foil
Representing Italy
Event	1st	2nd	3rd
Olympic Games	0	1	0
World Championships	3	0	0
Universiade	1	1	1
World Cup	0	0	1
Total	4	2	2
Olympic Games
Silver medal – second place	2024 Paris	Team
World Championships
Gold medal – first place	2022 Cairo	Team
Gold medal – first place	2025 Tbilisi	Team
Gold medal – first place	2026 Hong Kong	Team
European Championships
Gold medal – first place	2022 Antalya	Team
Gold medal – first place	2025 Genoa	Individual
Gold medal – first place	2025 Genoa	Team
Gold medal – first place	2026 Antony	Team
Bronze medal – third place	2023 Plovdiv	Individual
Bronze medal – third place	2024 Basel	Team
Junior World Championships
Bronze medal – third place	2017 Plovdiv	Individual
Universiade
Gold medal – first place	2019 Naples	Team
Silver medal – second place	2019 Naples	Individual
Bronze medal – third place	2017 Taipei	Team

Guillaume Bianchi (born 30 July 1997) is an Italian fencer who won an individual silver medal and a team gold at the 2019 Summer Universiade.

His first podium at the World Cup, was in 2018 in Bonn. He also won the gold team medal at 2018 European Fencing Under 23 Championships.

== Biography ==
Born in Rome, he currently lives in Frascati where he trains at Frascati Scherma. He is studying at Sapienza University of Rome. As a junior, he won individual bronze medal at the 2017 Junior and Cadet World Fencing Championships. He competed at the 2017–18 Fencing World Cup.

== Achievements ==
Year	Competition	Venue	Position	Event	Notes
2017	Universiade	(Chinese Taipei) Taipei	3rd	Foil Team	
2018	World Cup	(Germany) Bonn	3rd	Foil	
2019	Universiade	(Italy) Naples	2nd	Foil	
2019	Universiade	(Italy) Naples	1st	Foil Team	

== See also ==
- Italy at the 2019 Summer Universiade
