= 2017 World Cup =

2017 World Cup may refer to:

- 2017 Alpine Skiing World Cup
- 2017 Canoe Slalom World Cup
- 2016–17 Fencing World Cup
- 2017 FIFA Beach Soccer World Cup
- 2017 FIFA Club World Cup
- 2017 FIFA U-17 World Cup
- 2017 FIFA U-20 World Cup
- 2017 Rugby League World Cup
- 2017 Women's Cricket World Cup
- 2017 Women's Lacrosse World Cup
- 2017 Women's Rugby League World Cup
- 2017 Women's Rugby World Cup
- 2017 World Cup (snooker)
- Chess World Cup 2017

== See also ==
- 2017 World Championship (disambiguation)
