= Andrzej Rządkowski =

Polish fencer

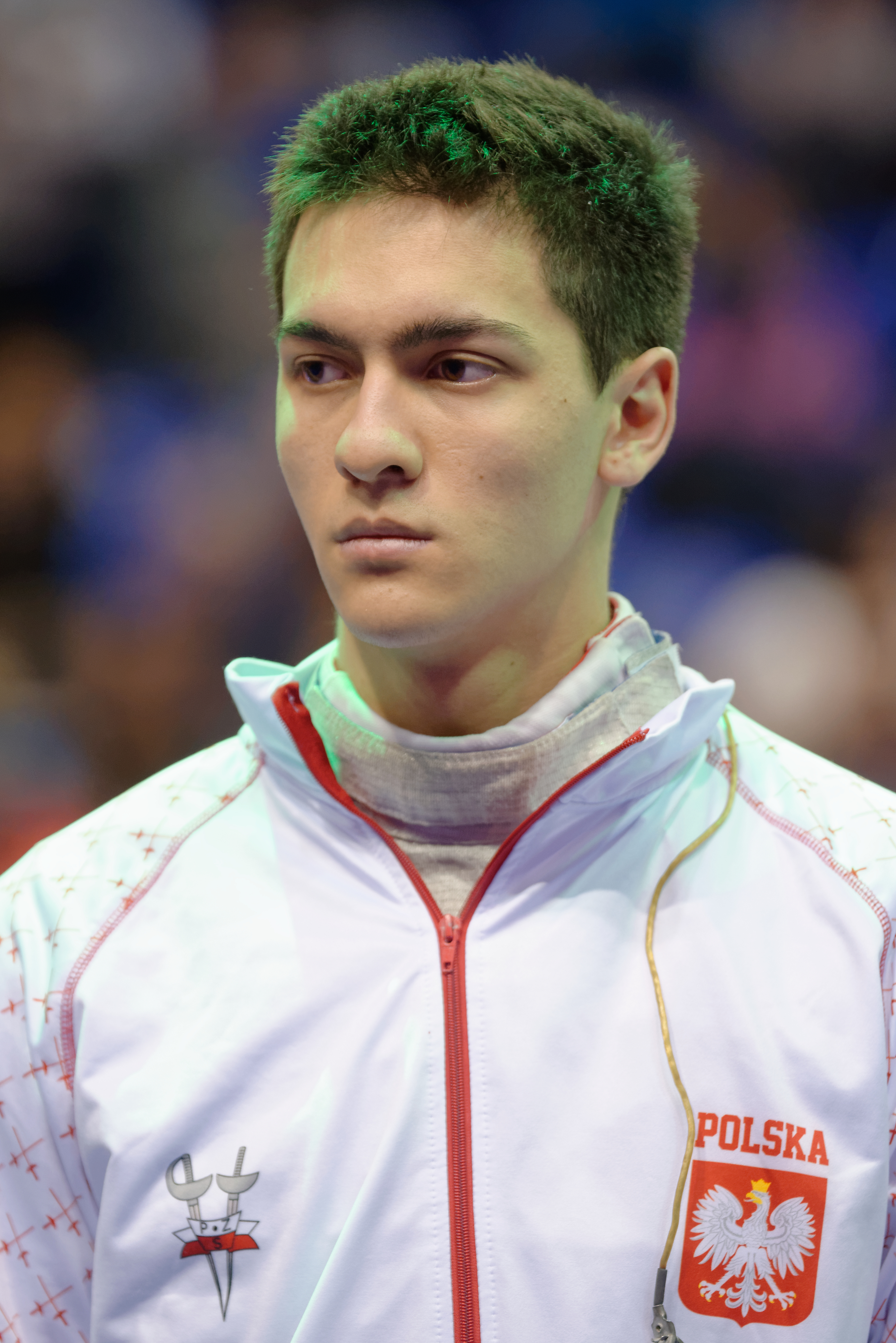
- Rządkowski in 2016

Personal information
- Nationality: Polish
- Born: 4 March 1997 (age 29) Wrocław, Poland

Sport
- Club: Klub Szermierczy Wrocławianie
Medal record
Men's foil
Representing the Poland
European Championships
Silver medal – second place	2026 Antony	Individual
Bronze medal – third place	2018 Novi Sad	Team
Bronze medal – third place	2022 Antalya	Team

Andrzej Rządkowski (born 4 March 1997) is a Polish fencer specializing in foil. He is a gold and silver medalist at the 2014 Summer Youth Olympics and a cadet world champion from the same year. He is also a medalist at the European U23, junior, and cadet championships.

== Career ==
Rządkowski is a medalist of various international championships in junior categories.

In 2014 he won bronze medals in both individual and team foil competitions at the Cadet European Championships (under 17) in Jerusalem. At the same location, he won a gold medal in the team foil event at the Junior European Championships (under 20). Additionally, in Plovdiv, he became the individual world cadet champion in foil. In 2014, he also competed in the 2014 Summer Youth Olympics, where he won a gold medal in the boys' foil event and a silver medal in the mixed team event, where he competed as part of Team Europe 1.

In 2015 he won a bronze medal in the team foil event at the U23 European Championships in Vicenza.

In 2016 he won a silver medal in the individual foil event at the Junior European Championships held in Novi Sad. At the same event, he also won a bronze medal in the team foil competition.

Rządkowski has also won medals at the Polish Fencing Championships in various age categories (under 14, 17, and 20). He is also a medalist at the Polish Senior Fencing Championships, including winning the team foil event in 2013.

== Personal life ==
His mother is Thai, and his father, Marek Rządkowski, was a boxer for Gwardia Wrocław. He started fencing thanks to a friend.
