= 2018 European Fencing Under-23 Championships =

2018 European Fencing Under 23 Championships
- Host city: (Armenia) Yerevan
- Dates: 15–19 April 2018
- Main venue: Yerevan State University indoor sports arena
- Website: www.yerevan2018.am

The 2018 European Fencing Under 23 Championships was held in Yerevan, Armenia from 15 to 19 April 2018 at the Yerevan State University indoor sports arena.

== Schedule ==
●	Opening Ceremony	●	Finals	●	Closing Ceremony

April	15	16	17	18	19	Total
Ceremonies	●				●	
Foil Individual		Women	Men			2
Épée Individual	Women	Men				2
Sabre Individual	Men		Women			2
Foil Team				Women	Men	2
Épée Team				Women	Men	2
Sabre Team				Men	Women	2
Total Gold Medals	2	2	2	3	3	12

== Medal summary ==
=== Men's events ===
Event	Gold	Silver	Bronze
Foil	Kirill Borodachev (RUS)	Wallerand Roger (FRA)	Alexandr Sirotkin (RUS)
Foil	Kirill Borodachev (RUS)	Wallerand Roger (FRA)	Uladzislau Lahunou (BLR)
Épée	Nelson Lopez-Pourtier (FRA)	Aymerick Gally (FRA)	Alexis Bayard (SUI)
Épée	Nelson Lopez-Pourtier (FRA)	Aymerick Gally (FRA)	Georgiy Bruev (RUS)
Sabre	Dario Cavaliere (ITA)	Nika Shengelia (GEO)	Dmitriy Danilenko (RUS)
Sabre	Dario Cavaliere (ITA)	Nika Shengelia (GEO)	Baptiste Dubarry (FRA)
Team Foil	Italy; Damiano Rosatelli; Francesco Ingargiola; Guillaume Bianchi; Davide Filippi	Russia; Iskander Akhmetov; Grigoriy Semenyuk; Alexandr Sirotkin; Kirill Borodachev	France; Alexandre Ediri; Wallerand Roger; Alexandre Sido; Erwan Auclin
Team Épée	Switzerland; Lucas Malcotti; Alexis Bayard; Alexandre Pittet; Elia Dagani	Spain; Álvaro Ibáñez; Yulen Pereira; Àngel Fabregat; Manuel Bargues	France; Aymerick Gally; Clément Dorigo; Nelson Lopez-Pourtier; Romain Cannone
Team Sabre	Italy; Francesco Bonsanto; Leonardo Dreossi; Dario Cavaliere; Federico Riccardi	France; Charles Colleau; Jean-Philippe Patrice; Edern Annic; Baptiste Dubarry	Belarus; Siarhei Kisel; Anton Davydzenka; Artsiom Novikau; Kiryl Kirpichou

=== Women's events ===
Event	Gold	Silver	Bronze
Foil	Martina Sinigalia (ITA)	Maria Boldor (ROU)	Eva Lacheray (FRA)
Foil	Martina Sinigalia (ITA)	Maria Boldor (ROU)	Elisabetta Bianchin (ITA)
Épée	Aleksandra Zamachowska (POL)	Roberta Marzani (ITA)	Kim Jasmin Büch (SUI)
Épée	Aleksandra Zamachowska (POL)	Roberta Marzani (ITA)	Maria Obraztsova (RUS)
Sabre	Valeriya Bolshakova (RUS)	Eloisa Passaro (ITA)	Iryna Shchukla (TUR)
Sabre	Valeriya Bolshakova (RUS)	Eloisa Passaro (ITA)	Malina Vongsavady (FRA)
Team Foil	Russia; Oksana Martines Hauregi; Kristina Samsonova; Adelya Abdrakhmanova; Regina Garifullina	Poland; Marika Chrzanowska; Julia Chrzanowska; Julia Walczyk; Katarzyna Lachman	France; Coralie Brot; Chloe Jubenot; Maéva Rancurel; Eva Lacheray
Team Épée	Italy; Nicol Foietta; Roberta Marzani; Alice Clerici; Ginevra Roato	Switzerland; Kim Jasmin Büch; Noemi Moeschlin; Aurore Favre; Manon Emmenegger	Poland; Barbara Rutz; Aleksandra Zamachowska; Karolina Mrochem; Anna Mroszczak
Team Sabre	Russia; Valeriya Bolshakova; Anastasiya Kochetova; Anastasia Bazhenova; Alina Moseyko	Italy; Eloisa Passaro; Michela Battiston; Rebecca Gargano; Camilla Schina	Ukraine; Diana Zalevska; Yevgeniia Alenina; Yuliia Bakastova; Olena Pysarenko

== Medal table ==
Rank	Nation	Gold	Silver	Bronze	Total
1	Italy (ITA)	5	3	1	9
2	Russia (RUS)	4	1	4	9
3	France (FRA)	1	3	6	10
4	Switzerland (SUI)	1	1	2	4
5	Poland (POL)	1	1	1	3
6	Georgia (GEO)	0	1	0	1
6	Romania (ROU)	0	1	0	1
6	Spain (ESP)	0	1	0	1
9	Belarus (BLR)	0	0	2	2
10	Turkey (TUR)	0	0	1	1
10	Ukraine (UKR)	0	0	1	1
Totals (11 entries)		12	12	18	42

== See also ==
- Armenian Fencing Federation
