= 2003–04 Fencing World Cup =

International fencing competition

The 32nd FIE Fencing World Cup began in October 2002 and concluded in October 2003 at the 2003 World Fencing Championships in Havana, Cuba.

== Individual Épée ==
Men
1	Alfredo Rota (ITA)	204
2	Marcel Fischer (SUI)	174
3	Christoph Marik (AUT)	166
4	Gábor Boczkó (HUN)	115
5	Zhao Gang (CHN)	114
6	Yoeri Van Laecke (BEL)	108
7	Jérôme Jeannet (FRA)	108
8	Érik Boisse (FRA)	103

Women
1	Laura Flessel-Colovic (FRA)	153
2	Britta Heidemann (GER)	144
3	Adrienn Hormay (HUN)	139
4	Maureen Nisima (FRA)	127
5	Imke Duplitzer (GER)	119
6	Li Na (CHN)	118
7	Sherraine McKay (CAN)	117
8	Claudia Bokel (GER)	111

== Individual Foil ==
Men
1	Salvatore Sanzo (ITA)	218
2	Andrea Cassarà (ITA)	214
3	Ralf Bißdorf (GER)	147
4	Cédric Gohy (BEL)	134
5	Brice Guyart (FRA)	126
6	Simone Vanni (ITA)	125
7	Wu Hanxiong (CHN)	111
8	João Gomes (POR)	109

Women
1	Valentina Vezzali (ITA)	279
2	Giovanna Trillini (ITA)	205
3	Sylwia Gruchała (POL)	178
4	Roxana Scarlat (ROU)	166
5	Aida Mohamed (HUN)	151
6	Laura Badea (ROU)	141
7	Gabriella Varga (HUN)	121
8	Adeline Wuillème (FRA)	118

== Individual Sabre ==
Men
1	Volodymyr Lukashenko (UKR)	194
2	Stanislav Pozdnyakov (RUS)	187
3	Sergey Sharikov (RUS)	160
4	Zsolt Nemcsik (HUN)	139
5	Dmitry Lapkes (BLR)	131
6	Balázs Lengyel (HUN)	129
7	Mihai Covaliu (ROU)	128
8	Gaël Touya (FRA)	124

Women
1	Sada Jacobson (USA)	184
2	Anne-Lise Touya (FRA)	171
3	Yelena Nechayeva (RUS)	151
4	Mariel Zagunis (USA)	127
5	Sofiya Velikaya (RUS)	106
6	Tan Xue (CHN)	103
7	Emily Jacobson (USA)	101
8	Léonore Perrus (FRA)	100

== Team Épée ==
Men
1	France	192
2	Hungary	156
3	Russia	140
4	Germany	130
5	Italy	128
6	Estonia	112
7	Ukraine	112
8	China	92

Women
1	France	168
2	Germany	156
3	China	156
4	Hungary	152
5	Russia	94
6	South Korea	88
7	Italy	81
8	Canada	79

== Team Foil ==
Men
1	Germany	244
2	Italy	224
3	Russia	188
4	China	172
5	France	142
6	South Korea	138
7	United States	121
8	Poland	108

Women
1	Poland	256
2	Italy	192
3	Hungary	154
4	Russia	154
5	Romania	152
6	Germany	130
7	France	96
8	Japan	77

== Team Sabre ==
Men
1	France	168
2	Italy	142
3	Russia	136
4	Ukraine	134
5	Hungary	128
6	United States	126
7	China	113
8	Germany	110

Women
1	Romania	128
2	Russia	116
3	United States	116
4	China	92
5	Azerbaijan	88
6	Hungary	76
7	Poland	72
8	France	70
