= 2022 European Fencing Championships =

- Host city: (Turkey) Antalya
- Dates: 17–22 June
- Main venue: Antalya Sports Hall
- Website: www.euroantalya2022.com

The 2022 European Fencing Championships was a fencing competition that took place from 17 to 22 June 2022 in Antalya, Turkey.

== Schedule ==
| ● | Opening Ceremony | ● | Finals | ● | Closing Ceremony |

| June | 17 | 18 | 19 | 20 | 21 | 22 | Total |
|---|---|---|---|---|---|---|---|
| Ceremonies | ● | | | | | ● | |
| Foil Individual | Women | Men | | | | | 2 |
| Épée Individual | | Women | Men | | | | 2 |
| Sabre Individual | Men | | Women | | | | 2 |
| Foil Team | | | | Women | Men | | 2 |
| Épée Team | | | | | Women | Men | 2 |
| Sabre Team | | | | Men | | Women | 2 |
| Total Gold Medals | 2 | 2 | 2 | 2 | 2 | 2 | 12 |

== Medal summary ==
=== Men's events ===
| Event | Gold | Silver | Bronze |
|---|---|---|---|
| Foil | Daniele Garozzo; Italy | Tommaso Marini; Italy | Giorgio Avola; Italy |
| Foil | Daniele Garozzo; Italy | Tommaso Marini; Italy | Maximilien Chastanet; France |
| Épée | Yannick Borel; France | Tristan Tulen; Netherlands | Alexis Bayard; Switzerland |
| Épée | Yannick Borel; France | Tristan Tulen; Netherlands | Max Heinzer; Switzerland |
| Sabre | Sandro Bazadze; Georgia | Luca Curatoli; Italy | Eliott Bibi; France |
| Sabre | Sandro Bazadze; Georgia | Luca Curatoli; Italy | Boladé Apithy; France |
| Team Foil | Italy; Guillaume Bianchi; Alessio Foconi; Daniele Garozzo; Tommaso Marini | France; Maximilien Chastanet; Alexandre Ediri; Pierre Loisel; Alexandre Sido | Poland; Leszek Rajski; Andrzej Rządkowski; Michał Siess; Adrian Wojtkowiak |
| Team Épée | Italy; Gabriele Cimini; Davide Di Veroli; Andrea Santarelli; Federico Vismara | Israel; Grigori Beskin; Yonatan Cohen; Yuval Shalom Freilich; Ido Harper | France; Alexandre Bardenet; Yannick Borel; Romain Cannone; Alex Fava |
| Team Sabre | Hungary; Tamás Decsi; Csanád Gémesi; András Szatmári; Áron Szilágyi | Ukraine; Vasyl Humen; Bogdan Platonov; Yuriy Tsap; Andriy Yahodka | Turkey; Muhammed Anasız; Tolga Aslan; Kerem Çağlayan; Enver Yıldırım |

=== Women's events ===
| Event | Gold | Silver | Bronze |
|---|---|---|---|
| Foil | Leonie Ebert; Germany | Arianna Errigo; Italy | Ysaora Thibus; France |
| Foil | Leonie Ebert; Germany | Arianna Errigo; Italy | Alice Volpi; Italy |
| Épée | Vlada Kharkova; Ukraine | Rossella Fiamingo; Italy | Mara Navarria; Italy |
| Épée | Vlada Kharkova; Ukraine | Rossella Fiamingo; Italy | Martyna Swatowska-Wenglarczyk; Poland |
| Sabre | Anna Bashta; Azerbaijan | Rossella Gregorio; Italy | Zuzanna Cieślar; Poland |
| Sabre | Anna Bashta; Azerbaijan | Rossella Gregorio; Italy | Sara Balzer; France |
| Team Foil | Italy; Arianna Errigo; Martina Favaretto; Francesca Palumbo; Alice Volpi | France; Anita Blaze; Solène Butruille; Pauline Ranvier; Ysaora Thibus | Germany; Leandra Behr; Leonie Ebert; Kim Kirschen; Anne Sauer |
| Team Épée | France; Marie-Florence Candassamy; Auriane Mallo; Lauren Rembi; Coraline Vitalis | Italy; Rossella Fiamingo; Federica Isola; Mara Navarria; Alberta Santuccio | Ukraine; Inna Brovko; Vlada Kharkova; Yana Shemyakina; Yuliya Svystil |
| Team Sabre | France; Sara Balzer; Sarah Noutcha; Caroline Queroli; Malina Vongsavady | Italy; Michela Battiston; Martina Criscio; Rossella Gregorio; Eloisa Passaro | Ukraine; Yuliia Bakastova; Olga Kharlan; Olena Kravatska; Olena Voronina |

=== Medal table ===
* Host nation (Turkey)

| Rank | Nation | Gold | Silver | Bronze | Total |
|---|---|---|---|---|---|
| 1 | Italy | 4 | 7 | 3 | 14 |
| 2 | France | 3 | 2 | 6 | 11 |
| 3 | Ukraine | 1 | 1 | 2 | 4 |
| 4 | Germany | 1 | 0 | 1 | 2 |
| 5 | Azerbaijan | 1 | 0 | 0 | 1 |
| 5 | Georgia | 1 | 0 | 0 | 1 |
| 5 | Hungary | 1 | 0 | 0 | 1 |
| 8 | Israel | 0 | 1 | 0 | 1 |
| 8 | Netherlands | 0 | 1 | 0 | 1 |
| 10 | Poland | 0 | 0 | 3 | 3 |
| 11 | Switzerland | 0 | 0 | 2 | 2 |
| 12 | Turkey* | 0 | 0 | 1 | 1 |
| Totals (12 entries) | | 12 | 12 | 18 | 42 |

== Results ==
=== Men ===
==== Foil individual ====
| Position | Name | Country |
|---|---|---|
| 1st place, gold medalist(s) | Daniele Garozzo | Italy |
| 2nd place, silver medalist(s) | Tommaso Marini | Italy |
| 3rd place, bronze medalist(s) | Giorgio Avola | Italy |
| 3rd place, bronze medalist(s) | Maximilien Chastanet | France |
| 5. | Alexander Choupenitch | Czech Republic |
| 6. | Alexandre Sido | France |
| 7. | Carlos Llavador | Spain |
| 8. | Alessio Foconi | Italy |

Round of 16
1 | (Italy) Tommaso Marini | 15
48 | (Poland) Andrzej Rządkowski | 11
24 | (France) Pierre Loisel | 14
8 | (France) Alexandre Sido | 15
5 | (Hungary) Andras Nemeth | 8
12 | (Italy) Alessio Foconi | 14
20 | (United Kingdom) Marcus Mepstead | 6
4 | (France) Maximilien Chastanet | 15
3 | (Czech Republic) Alexander Choupenitch | 15
19 | (Hungary) Gergő Szemes | 11
22 | (Austria) Maximilian Ettelt | 9
6 | (Italy) Daniele Garozzo | 15
7 | (United Kingdom) James-Andrew Davis | 12
10 | (Spain) Carlos Llavador | 15
18 | (Italy) Giorgio Avola | 15
2 | (Hungary) Dániel Dósa | 14

Quarter-finals
1 | (Italy) Tommaso Marini | 15
8 | (France) Alexandre Sido | 6
12 | (Italy) Alessio Foconi | 13
4 | (France) Maximilien Chastanet | 15
3 | (Czech Republic) Alexander Choupenitch | 6
6 | (Italy) Daniele Garozzo | 15
10 | (Spain) Carlos Llavador | 13
18 | (Italy) Giorgio Avola | 15

Semi-finals
1 | (Italy) Tommaso Marini | 15
5 | (France) Maximilien Chastanet | 6
6 | (Italy) Daniele Garozzo | 15
18 | (Italy) Giorgio Avola | 10

Final
1 | (Italy) Tommaso Marini | 9
6 | (Italy) Daniele Garozzo | 15

==== Épée individual ====
| Position | Name | Country |
|---|---|---|
| 1st place, gold medalist(s) | Yannick Borel | France |
| 2nd place, silver medalist(s) | Tristan Tulen | Netherlands |
| 3rd place, bronze medalist(s) | Alexis Bayard | Switzerland |
| 3rd place, bronze medalist(s) | Max Heinzer | Switzerland |
| 5. | Jakub Jurka | Czech Republic |
| 6. | Neisser Loyola | Belgium |
| 7. | Richard Schmidt | Germany |
| 8. | Marco Brinkmann | Germany |

Round of 16
1 | (Switzerland) Alexis Bayard | 15
16 | (Estonia) Sten Priinits | 14
41 | (Belgium) Neisser Loyola | 13
8 | (Israel) Yonatan Cohen | 12
28 | (Netherlands) Tristan Tulen | 15
21 | (France) Alex Fava | 11
52 | (Germany) Marco Brinkmann | 14
36 | (Germany) Lukas Bellmann | 10
3 | (Switzerland) Max Heinzer | 15
51 | (Estonia) Ruslan Eskov | 13
43 | (Poland) Maciej Bielec | 12
6 | (Czech Republic) Jakub Jurka | 15
7 | (Denmark) Patrick Jørgensen | 9
55 | (France) Yannick Borel | 15
47 | (Germany) Richard Schmidt | 15
2 | (Israel) Ido Harper | 14

Quarter-finals
1 | (Switzerland) Alexis Bayard | 5
41 | (Belgium) Neisser Loyola | 5
28 | (Netherlands) Tristan Tulen | 15
52 | (Germany) Marco Brinkmann | 13
3 | (Switzerland) Max Heinzer | 15
6 | (Czech Republic) Jakub Jurka | 10
55 | (France) Yannick Borel | 15
47 | (Germany) Richard Schmidt | 10

Semi-finals
1 | (Switzerland) Alexis Bayard | 14
28 | (Netherlands) Tristan Tulen | 15
3 | (Switzerland) Max Heinzer | 11
55 | (France) Yannick Borel | 15

Final
28 | (Netherlands) Tristan Tulen | 1
55 | (France) Yannick Borel | 15

==== Sabre individual ====
| Position | Name | Country |
|---|---|---|
| 1st place, gold medalist(s) | Sandro Bazadze | Georgia |
| 2nd place, silver medalist(s) | Luca Curatoli | Italy |
| 3rd place, bronze medalist(s) | Eliott Bibi | France |
| 3rd place, bronze medalist(s) | Bolade Apithy | France |
| 5. | Răzvan Ursachi | Romania |
| 6. | Iulian Teodosiu | Romania |
| 7. | Beka Bazadze | Georgia |
| 8. | Csanád Gémesi | Hungary |

Round of 16
1 | (Germany) Matyas Szabo | 13
16 | (Georgia (country)) Sandro Bazadze | 15
9 | (Italy) Giovanni Repetti | 10
8 | (Romania) Răzvan Ursachi | 15
5 | (France) Eliott Bibi | 15
12 | (Turkey) Enver Yıldırım | 14
13 | (Hungary) Csanád Gémesi | 15
4 | (Germany) Frederic Kindler | 5
3 | (Italy) Luca Curatoli | 15
14 | (United Kingdom) Jonathan Webb | 7
11 | (Georgia (country)) Beka Bazadze | 15
6 | (Ukraine) Yuriy Tsap | 11
7 | (Hungary) András Szatmári | 13
10 | (Romania) Iulian Teodosiu | 15
18 | (France) Maxime Pianfetti | 8
2 | (France) Bolade Apithy | 15

Quarter-finals
1 | (Georgia (country)) Sandro Bazadze | 15
8 | (Romania) Răzvan Ursachi | 8
5 | (France) Eliott Bibi | 15
13 | (Hungary) Csanád Gémesi | 11
3 | (Italy) Luca Curatoli | 15
11 | (Georgia (country)) Beka Bazadze | 11
10 | (Romania) Iulian Teodosiu | 10
2 | (France) Bolade Apithy | 15

Semi-finals
1 | (Georgia (country)) Sandro Bazadze | 15
5 | (France) Eliott Bibi | 4
3 | (Italy) Luca Curatoli | 15
2 | (France) Bolade Apithy | 11

Final
1 | (Georgia (country)) Sandro Bazadze | 15
3 | (Italy) Luca Curatoli | 11

==== Foil team ====
Round of 16
Belgium | 45
Hungary | 38
Ukraine | 45
Israel | 32
Austria | 29
Poland | 45
Germany | 45
Georgia | 44
Czech Republic | 42
Spain | 45
Great Britain | 45
Netherlands | 29
Turkey | 14
Italy | 45

Quarter-finals
France | 45
Belgium | 37
Ukraine | 40
Poland | 44
Germany | 38
Spain | 45
Great Britain | 33
Italy | 45

Semi-finals
France | 42
Poland | 36
Spain | 19
Italy | 45

Final
France | 38
Italy | 45
Third place
Poland | 45
Spain | 29

==== Épée team ====
Round of 32
Finland | 41
Great Britain | 45
Portugal | 40
Czech Republic | 45
Sweden | 45
Turkey | 28
Azerbaijan | 34
Netherlands | 45
Belgium | 29
Austria | 45

Round of 16
France | 45
Great Britain | 39
Poland | 32
Germany | 23
Italy | 45
Czech Republic | 34
Sweden | 34
Switzerland | 45
Hungary | 34
Netherlands | 29
Estonia | 37
Denmark | 38
Spain | 34
Israel | 45
Austria | 27
Ukraine | 33

Quarter-finals
France | 45
Poland | 29
Italy | 45
Switzerland | 41
Hungary | 43
Denmark | 45
Israel | 45
Ukraine | 33

Semi-finals
France | 44
Italy | 45
Denmark | 44
Israel | 45

Final
Italy | 45
Israel | 32
Third place
France | 45
Denmark | 41

==== Sabre team ====
Round of 16
Poland | 45
Great Britain | 42
Romania | 45
Austria | 12
Turkey | 45
Georgia | 42
Spain | 33
Ukraine | 45

Quarter-finals
Hungary | 45
Poland | 32
Romania | 42
France | 45
Italy | 37
Turkey | 45
Ukraine | 45
Germany | 44

Semi-finals
Hungary | 45
France | 35
Turkey | 43
Ukraine | 45

Final
Hungary | 45
Ukraine | 39
Third place
France | 39
Turkey | 45

=== Women ===
==== Foil individual ====
| Position | Name | Country |
|---|---|---|
| 1st place, gold medalist(s) | Leonie Ebert | Germany |
| 2nd place, silver medalist(s) | Arianna Errigo | Italy |
| 3rd place, bronze medalist(s) | Ysaora Thibus | France |
| 3rd place, bronze medalist(s) | Alice Volpi | Italy |
| 5. | Anne Sauer | Germany |
| 6. | Carolina Stutchbury | Great Britain |
| 7. | Francesca Palumbo | Italy |
| 8. | Kata Kondricz | Hungary |

Round of 16
1 | (Germany) Leonie Ebert | 15
16 | (Austria) Olivia Wohlgemuth | 6
9 | (Poland) Hanna Łyczbińska | 8
8 | (United Kingdom) Carolina Stutchbury | 15
5 | (Germany) Anne Sauer | 15
12 | (France) Pauline Ranvier | 13
20 | (Ukraine) Kateryna Chentsova | 10
4 | (Italy) Alice Volpi | 15
3 | (Turkey) İrem Karamete | 11
14 | (Hungary) Kata Kondricz | 15
22 | (Poland) Julia Walczyk | 14
6 | (France) Ysaora Thibus | 15
7 | (Italy) Martina Favaretto | 11
10 | (Italy) Francesca Palumbo | 15
15 | (Poland) Martyna Długosz | 4
2 | (Italy) Arianna Errigo | 15

Quarter-finals
1 | (Germany) Leonie Ebert | 15
8 | (United Kingdom) Carolina Stutchbury | 9
5 | (Germany) Anne Sauer | 10
4 | (Italy) Alice Volpi | 11
14 | (Hungary) Kata Kondricz | 9
6 | (France) Ysaora Thibus | 15
10 | (Italy) Francesca Palumbo | 3
2 | (Italy) Arianna Errigo | 15

Semi-finals
1 | (Germany) Leonie Ebert | 15
4 | (Italy) Alice Volpi | 9
6 | (France) Ysaora Thibus | 11
2 | (Italy) Arianna Errigo | 15

Final
1 | (Germany) Leonie Ebert | 15
2 | (Italy) Arianna Errigo | 9

==== Épée individual ====
| Position | Name | Country |
|---|---|---|
| 1st place, gold medalist(s) | Vlada Kharkova | Ukraine |
| 2nd place, silver medalist(s) | Rossella Fiamingo | Italy |
| 3rd place, bronze medalist(s) | Mara Navarria | Italy |
| 3rd place, bronze medalist(s) | Martyna Swatowska-Wenglarczyk | Poland |
| 5. | Eszter Muhari | Hungary |
| 6. | Alexandra Ndolo | Germany |
| 7. | Erika Kirpu | Estonia |
| 8. | Pauline Brunner | Switzerland |

Round of 16
33 | (France) Auriane Mallo | 14
16 | (Germany) Alexandra Ndolo | 15
9 | (Switzerland) Noemi Moeschlin | 13
8 | (Italy) Rossella Fiamingo | 15
28 | (Switzerland) Laura Stähli | 14
21 | (Switzerland) Pauline Brunner | 15
52 | (Sweden) Emma Fransson | 9
36 | (Italy) Mara Navarria | 15
3 | (Ukraine) Vlada Kharkova | 15
14 | (France) Marie-Florence Candassamy | 11
11 | (Turkey) Gökçe Günaç | 6
6 | (Hungary) Eszter Muhari | 15
7 | (Italy) Federica Isola | 8
10 | (Poland) Martyna Swatowska-Wenglarczyk | 15
18 | (Estonia) Erika Kirpu | 15
34 | (Ukraine) Yana Shemyakina | 14

Quarter-finals
16 | (Germany) Alexandra Ndolo | 12
8 | (Italy) Rossella Fiamingo | 15
21 | (Switzerland) Pauline Brunner | 7
36 | (Italy) Mara Navarria | 15
3 | (Ukraine) Vlada Kharkova | 15
6 | (Hungary) Eszter Muhari | 8
10 | (Poland) Martyna Swatowska-Wenglarczyk | 15
18 | (Estonia) Erika Kirpu | 11

Semi-finals
8 | (Italy) Rossella Fiamingo | 7
36 | (Italy) Mara Navarria | 6
3 | (Ukraine) Vlada Kharkova | 15
10 | (Poland) Martyna Swatowska-Wenglarczyk | 10

Final
8 | (Italy) Rossella Fiamingo | 10
3 | (Ukraine) Vlada Kharkova | 15

==== Sabre individual ====
| Position | Name | Country |
|---|---|---|
| 1st place, gold medalist(s) | Anna Bashta | Azerbaijan |
| 2nd place, silver medalist(s) | Rossella Gregorio | Italy |
| 3rd place, bronze medalist(s) | Sara Balzer | France |
| 3rd place, bronze medalist(s) | Zuzanna Cieślar | Poland |
| 5. | Olga Kharlan | Ukraine |
| 6. | Caroline Queroli | France |
| 7. | Larissa Eifler | Germany |
| 8. | Araceli Navarro | Spain |

Round of 16
1 | (Ukraine) Olga Kharlan | 15
16 | (France) Malina Vongsavady | 8
9 | (Azerbaijan) Palina Kaspiarovich | 14
8 | (Azerbaijan) Anna Bashta | 15
5 | (Germany) Larissa Eifler | 15
21 | (Italy) Martina Criscio | 11
13 | (Turkey) Iryna Shchukla | 10
4 | (Poland) Zuzanna Cieślar | 15
3 | (France) Caroline Queroli | 15
19 | (Azerbaijan) Sabina Karimova | 11
22 | (Bulgaria) Olga Hramova | 9
27 | (Italy) Rossella Gregorio | 15
7 | (Spain) Lucía Martín-Portugués | 12
23 | (Spain) Araceli Navarro | 15
15 | (France) Sara Balzer | 15
34 | (Greece) Despina Georgiadou | 10

Quarter-finals
1 | (Ukraine) Olga Kharlan | 14
8 | (Azerbaijan) Anna Bashta | 15
5 | (Germany) Larissa Eifler | 13
4 | (Poland) Zuzanna Cieślar | 15
3 | (France) Caroline Queroli | 9
27 | (Italy) Rossella Gregorio | 15
23 | (Spain) Araceli Navarro | 13
15 | (France) Sara Balzer | 15

Semi-finals
8 | (Azerbaijan) Anna Bashta | 15
4 | (Poland) Zuzanna Cieślar | 6
27 | (Italy) Rossella Gregorio | 15
15 | (France) Sara Balzer | 11

Final
8 | (Azerbaijan) Anna Bashta | 15
27 | (Italy) Rossella Gregorio | 9

==== Foil team ====
Round of 16
Romania | 45
Austria | 38
Turkey | 24
Poland | 45
Ukraine | 45
Great Britain | 23

Quarter-finals
Italy | 45
Romania | 20
Spain | 24
Germany | 45
Hungary | 31
Poland | 45
Ukraine | 38
France | 43

Semi-finals
Italy | 45
Germany | 23
Poland | 28
France | 45

Final
Italy | 45
France | 25
Third place
Germany | 45
Poland | 31

==== Épée team ====
Round of 32
Austria | 45
Belgium | 29
Serbia | 36
Finland | 37
Sweden | 45
Turkey | 36

Round of 16
Poland | 45
Austria | 23
Romania | 37
Ukraine | 45
Hungary | 40
Spain | 26
Great Britain | 23
France | 44
Italy | 45
Finland | 24
Czech Republic | 28
Germany | 45
Switzerland | 45
Israel | 38
Sweden | 45
Estonia | 37

Quarter-finals
Poland | 42
Ukraine | 43
Hungary | 37
France | 45
Italy | 45
Germany | 36
Switzerland | 45
Sweden | 42

Semi-finals
Ukraine | 36
France | 45
Italy | 45
Switzerland | 32

Final
France | 43
Italy | 30
Third place
Ukraine | 45
Switzerland | 42

==== Sabre team ====
Round of 16
Germany | 45
Bulgaria | 32
Poland | 37
Ukraine | 45
Greece | 45
Azerbaijan | 37
Great Britain | 28
Spain | 45
Turkey | 45
Romania | 43

Quarter-finals
France | 45
Germany | 39
Ukraine | 45
Greece | 35
Hungary | 45
Spain | 41
Turkey | 40
Italy | 45

Semi-finals
France | 45
Ukraine | 43
Hungary | 38
Italy | 45

Final
France | 45
Italy | 23
Third place
Ukraine | 45
Hungary | 41
