= Alina Mikhailova =

Russian fencer

Fencing career
- Sport: Fencing
- Country: Russia
- Weapon: Sabre
- Hand: Right-handed
Medal record
Women's sabre
Representing Individual Neutral Athletes
European Championships
Gold medal – first place	2026 Antony	Team

Alina Mikhailova (Russian: Алина Михайлова) is a Russian right-handed sabre fencer.

== Career ==
During the 2025–26 Fencing World Cup in Tashkent on 27 March 2026, she won the individual sabre event. On 27 May 2026, during the World Cup in Lima, she helped Individual Neutral Athletes win team sabre gold.

In June 2026, she competed at the 2026 European Fencing Championships and won a gold medal in the team event.
