= 2017 World Championship =

2017 World Championship may refer to:

- 2017 Men's Bandy World Championship
- 2017 UCI Road World Championships
- 2017 UCI Track Cycling World Championships
- 2017 World Aquatics Championships
- 2017 Artistic Gymnastics World Championships
- 2017 World Championships in Athletics
- 2017 World Men's Handball Championship
- 2017 World Women's Handball Championship

== Motorsports ==
- 2017 FIA Formula One World Championship
- 2017 FIA World Endurance Championship
- 2017 FIA World Rally Championship
- 2017 FIA World Rallycross Championship
- 2017 FIA World Touring Car Championship

== Winter sports ==
- 2017 Biathlon World Championship
- 2017 FIS Alpine World Ski Championships
- 2017 FIS Nordic World Ski Championships
- 2017 FIS Freestyle World Ski Championships
- 2017 Men's World Ice Hockey Championships
- 2017 Women's Ice Hockey World Championships
- 2017 World Figure Skating Championships

== See also ==
- 2017 World Cup (disambiguation)
