= Elia Dagani =

Swiss épée fencer

Personal information
- Born: 3 February 1998 (age 28) Lugano, Switzerland
- Height: 1.80 m (5 ft 11 in)
- Weight: 82 kg (181 lb)
- Website: EliaDagani.ch

Fencing career
- Sport: Fencing
- Country: Switzerland
- Weapon: Épée
- Hand: Right-handed
- Club: Lugano Scherma
- FIE ranking: current ranking
Medal record
Men's fencing
Representing Switzerland
European Under 23 Championships
Gold medal – first place	2018 Yerevan	Team épée
European Under 17 Championships
Bronze medal – third place	2015	Individual épée

Elia Dagani (born 3 February 1998) is a Swiss épée fencer. He started fencing at the age of five. Dagani studied economics and management at the University of Milan. His club is Lugano Scherma.

Dagani participated at the 2018 European Fencing Under 23 Championships, where he won a gold medal.
