= Leonie Ebert =

German fencer (born 1999)

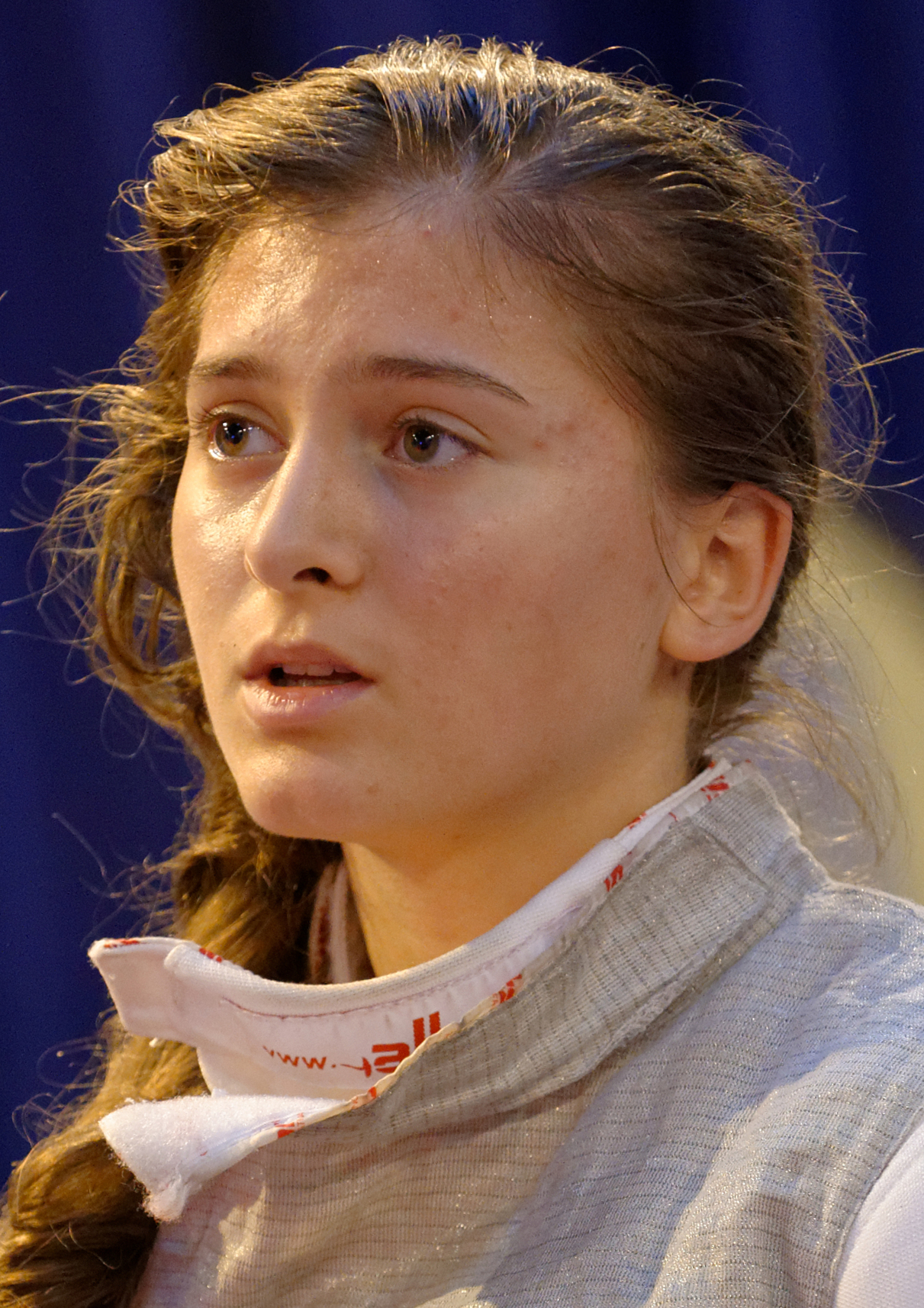
- Leonie Ebert in 2015

Personal information
- Nationality: German
- Born: 4 October 1999 (age 26)

Sport
- Sport: Fencing
Medal record
Women's foil
Representing Germany
European Games
Bronze medal – third place	2023 Kraków–Małopolska	Team
European Championships
Gold medal – first place	2022 Antalya	Individual
Bronze medal – third place	2017 Tbilisi	Team
Bronze medal – third place	2022 Antalya	Team
Bronze medal – third place	2023 Kraków	Team

Leonie Ebert (born 4 October 1999) is a German fencer. She competed in the women's foil event at the 2020 Summer Olympics.
