= 2016–17 Fencing World Cup =

International fencing competition

The 46th FIE Fencing World Cup began in October 2016 and concluded in July 2017 at the 2017 World Fencing Championships held in Leipzig.

== Individual épée ==
=== Top 8 ===
Men
1	(France) Yannick Borel	166
2	(Italy) Paolo Pizzo	159
3	(Estonia) Nikolai Novosjolov	158
4	(Italy) Marco Fichera	157
5	(South Korea) Park Kyoung-doo	157
6	(South Korea) Kweon Young-jun	122
7	(France) Daniel Jerent	118
8	(Venezuela) Rubén Limardo	117

Women
1	(Russia) Violetta Kolobova	168
2	(Estonia) Julia Beljajeva	164
3	(Poland) Ewa Nelip	162
4	(Russia) Tatiana Logunova	153
5	(Hungary) Emese Szász	132
6	(China) Sun Yiwen	129
7	(Hong Kong) Vivian Kong	119
8	(Germany) Alexandra Ndolo	116

== Individual foil ==
=== Top 8 ===
Men
1	(United States) Alexander Massialas	201
2	(Italy) Daniele Garozzo	200
3	(Russia) Timur Safin	194
4	(Italy) Alessio Foconi	174
5	(United States) Race Imboden	167
6	(United Kingdom) Richard Kruse	150
7	(Russia) Zherebchenko Dmitry	144
8	(Italy) Giorgio Avola	140

Women
1	(Russia) Inna Deriglazova	254
2	(Italy) Arianna Errigo	236
3	(United States) Lee Kiefer	230
4	(Italy) Alice Volpi	195
5	(France) Ysaora Thibus	177
6	(United States) Nicole Ross	162
7	(Italy) Martina Batini	146
8	(South Korea) Nam Hyun-hee	123

== Individual sabre ==
=== Top 8 ===
Men
1	(South Korea) Gu Bon-gil	231
2	(Italy) Luca Curatoli	189
3	(Hungary) András Szatmári	188
4	(Hungary) Áron Szilágyi	163
5	(France) Vincent Anstett	161
6	(South Korea) Kim Jung-hwan	160
7	(South Korea) Oh Sang-uk	158
8	(Germany) Max Hartung	128

Women
1	(Hungary) Anna Márton	197
2	(France) Cécilia Berder	183
3	(South Korea) Kim Ji-yeon	181
4	(France) Manon Brunet	158
5	(Russia) Yana Egorian	148
6	(Ukraine) Olga Kharlan	136
7	(Italy) Irene Vecchi	133
8	(France) Charlotte Lembach	127

== Team épée ==
=== Top 8 ===
Men
1	France	362
2	Russia	299
3	Italy	280
4	South Korea	272
5	Switzerland	268
6	Ukraine	264
7	Hungary	230
8	Czech Republic	221

Women
1	China	372
2	Estonia	368
3	South Korea	276
4	France	270
5	Russia	268
6	Ukraine	252
7	Italy	225
8	Russia	218

== Team foil ==
=== Top 8 ===
Men
1	France	388
2	Italy	364
3	United States	352
4	Russia	312
5	South Korea	242
6	Japan	230
7	Germany	209
8	Ukraine	190

Women
1	Italy	448
2	United States	332
3	Russia	312
4	France	264
5	Germany	260
6	Canada	223
7	Japan	212
8	South Korea	206

== Team sabre ==
=== Top 8 ===
Men
1	South Korea	388
2	Italy	364
3	Hungary	296
4	Iran	272
5	Russia	268
6	United States	254
7	Romania	241
8	France	210

Women
1	Italy	400
2	South Korea	317
3	France	312
4	Russia	280
5	United States	264
6	Ukraine	236
7	Japan	226
8	Hungary	223
