= Fencing World Cup =

Fencing competition

The Fencing World Cup is an international fencing competition held by the International Fencing Federation since 1968/1972 for seniors, 1987 for juniors and 2025 for cadets. In each weapon (Men's and Women's Épée, Sabre and Foil), three Grand Prix, five World Cup events and several satellite events are contested each season. The five top results as well as the Olympic Games or World Fencing Championships and zonal championships results are taken into account for each fencer's rankings. For teams, up to five World Cup events are held each year. The four top results as well as the Olympic Games or World Fencing Championships and zonal championships are taken into account for each country's rankings.

== History ==
1968/1972: Fencing World Cup

1987: Junior Fencing World Cup

2026: Cadet Fencing World Cup

== Individual World Cup ==
=== Formula ===
World Cup competitions are governed by the FIE rules for competitions. World Cups and Grand Prix are organised according to a mixed system consisting of one round of pools and a preliminary direct elimination table, followed by a main direct elimination table of 64 fencers.

The 16 top-ranked fencers in FIE rankings are exempt from the qualification phase and access directly the table of 64. All other competitors fence in pools of 7 fencers, or a mix of pools of 6 and pools of 7 if the number of fencers is not divisible by 7. The composition of the pools takes into account FIE rankings and the nationality of the fencers. Pools bouts last 3 minutes, or until a fencer has scored 5 hits. Fencers are ranked according to, successively:

- the ratio of victory per bout;
- the difference between the total number of hits scored and the total number of hits received;
- the total number of hits scored.

The 16 top-ranked fencers after the pools phase access directly the table of 64. The other fences compete in direct elimination tables until 32 fencers are selected to complete the table of 64. Direct elimination matches last three three-minute sessions with a one-minute break in between, or until a fencer has 15 hits.

Points per competition and ranking
	Gold	Silver	Bronze	4th	Table of 8	Table of 16	Table of 32	Table of 64	Tableau of 96
Olympic Games	96	78	60	54	42	24	12	6	
World Championships	80	65	50	_	35	20	10	5	2.5
Grand Prix	48	39	30	_	21	12	6	3	1.5
Zonal Championships / World Cup	32	26	20	_	14	8	4	2	1
Satellite	4	3	2	_	1	0	0	0	

=== Ranking winners ===
==== Senior ====
Edition	Men			Women		
Edition	Foil	Sabre	Épée	Foil	Sabre	Épée
1972	Witold Woyda; Poland	Viktor Sidyak; Soviet Union	Csaba Fenyvesi; Hungary	Antonella Ragno; Italy		
1973	Jenö Kamuti; Hungary	Viktor Sidyak; Soviet Union	Rolf Edling; Sweden	Valentina Nikonova; Soviet Union		
1974	Alexandr Romankov; Soviet Union	Mario Aldo Montano; Italy	Rolf Edling; Sweden	Ildikó Farkasinszky-Bóbis; Hungary		
1975	Christian Noël; France	Vladimir Nazlymov; Soviet Union	Boris Lukomsky; Soviet Union	Olga Knyazeva; Soviet Union		
1976	Alexandr Romankov; Soviet Union	Viktor Krovopuskov; Soviet Union	Alexander Pusch; West Germany	Yelena Novikova-Belova; Soviet Union		
1977	Carlo Montano; Italy	Vladimir Nazlymov; Soviet Union	Johan Harmenberg; Sweden	Valentina Sidorova; Soviet Union		
1978	Matthias Behr; West Germany	Imre Gedővári; Hungary	Aleksandr Abushakhmetov; Soviet Union	Yelena Novikova-Belova; Soviet Union		
1979	Vladimir Smirnov; Soviet Union	Viktor Krovopuskov; Soviet Union	Stefano Bellone; Italy	Valentina Sidorova; Soviet Union		
1980	Vladimir Smirnov; Soviet Union	Imre Gedővári; Hungary	Alexander Pusch; West Germany	Valentina Sidorova; Soviet Union		
1981	Andrea Borella; Italy	Gianfranco Dalla Barba; Italy	Alexander Pusch; West Germany	Dorina Vaccaroni; Italy		
1982	Mauro Numa; Italy	Imre Gedővári; Hungary	Angelo Mazzoni; Italy	Cornelia Hanisch; West Germany		
1983	Mauro Numa; Italy	Vasil Etropolski; Bulgaria	Elmar Borrmann; West Germany	Dorina Vaccaroni; Italy		
1984	Andrea Borella; Italy	Imre Gedővári; Hungary	Olivier Lenglet; France	Dorina Vaccaroni; Italy		
1985	Mauro Numa; Italy	Vasil Etropolski; Bulgaria	Robert Felisiak; Poland	Laurence Modaine; France		
1986	Federico Cervi; Italy	Vasil Etropolski; Bulgaria	Alexander Pusch; West Germany	Christiane Weber; West Germany		
1987	Andrea Borella; Italy	Janusz Olech; Poland	Arnd Schmitt; West Germany	Zsuzsanna Jánosi; Hungary		
1988	Stefano Cerioni; Italy	Imre Bujdosó; Hungary	Sandro Cuomo; Italy	Zsuzsanna Jánosi; Hungary		
1989	Andrea Borella; Italy	Vilmoș Szabo; Romania	Éric Srecki; France	Zita-Eva Funkenhauser; West Germany		Eva-Maria Ittner; West Germany
1990	Dmitry Shevchenko; Soviet Union	Grigory Kiriyenko; Soviet Union	Olivier Lenglet; France	Anja Fichtel-Mauritz; West Germany		Elisa Uga; Italy
1991	Thorsten Weidner; Germany	Péter Abay; Hungary	Arnd Schmitt; Germany	Giovanna Trillini; Italy		Mariann Horváth; Hungary
1992	Sergei Golubitsky; CIS	Vilmoș Szabo; Romania	Éric Srecki; France	Margherita Zalaffi; Italy		Mariann Horváth; Hungary
1993	Sergei Golubitsky; Ukraine	Marco Marin; Italy	Angelo Mazzoni; Italy	Diana Bianchedi; Italy		Elisabeth Knechtl; Austria
1994	Sergei Golubitsky; Ukraine	Stanislav Pozdnyakov; Russia	Angelo Mazzoni; Italy	Giovanna Trillini; Italy		Katja Nass; Germany
1995	Sergei Golubitsky; Ukraine	Stanislav Pozdnyakov; Russia	Éric Srecki; France	Giovanna Trillini; Italy		Taymi Chappé; Spain
1996	Rolando Tucker; Cuba	Stanislav Pozdnyakov; Russia	Jean-François Di Martino; France	Valentina Vezzali; Italy		Tímea Nagy; Hungary
1997	Wolfgang Wienand; Germany	Damien Touya; France	Éric Srecki; France	Valentina Vezzali; Italy		Valérie Barlois; France
1998	Elvis Gregory; Cuba	Luigi Tarantino; Italy	Sandro Cuomo; Italy	Giovanna Trillini; Italy		Claudia Bokel; Germany
1999	Sergei Golubitsky; Ukraine	Stanislav Pozdnyakov; Russia	Pavel Kolobkov; Russia	Valentina Vezzali; Italy	Yelena Jemayeva; Azerbaijan	Ildikó Mincza; Hungary
2000	Ralf Bißdorf; Germany	Stanislav Pozdnyakov; Russia	Arnd Schmitt; Germany	Valentina Vezzali; Italy	Anne-Lise Touya; France	Ildikó Mincza; Hungary
2001	Ralf Bißdorf; Germany	Mihai Covaliu; Romania	Jörg Fiedler; Germany	Valentina Vezzali; Italy	Anne-Lise Touya; France	Imke Duplitzer; Germany
2002	Ralf Bißdorf; Germany	Stanislav Pozdnyakov; Russia	Christoph Marik; Austria	Valentina Vezzali; Italy	Yelena Jemayeva; Azerbaijan	Laura Flessel; France
2003	Andre Wessels; Germany	Domonkos Ferjancsik; Hungary	Christoph Marik; Austria	Valentina Vezzali; Italy	Sada Jacobson; United States	Laura Flessel; France
2004	Salvatore Sanzo; Italy	Vladimir Lukashenko; Ukraine	Alfredo Rota; Italy	Valentina Vezzali; Italy	Sada Jacobson; United States	Laura Flessel; France
2005	Erwann Le Péchoux; France	Aleksey Yakimenko; Russia	Stefano Carozzo; Italy	Margherita Granbassi; Italy	Sada Jacobson; United States	Imke Duplitzer; Germany
2006	Andrea Cassarà; Italy	Zsolt Nemcsik; Hungary	Gábor Boczkó; Hungary	Sylwia Gruchała; Poland	Mariel Zagunis; United States	Sherraine Schalm; Canada
2007	Andrea Baldini; Italy	Aleksey Yakimenko; Russia	Érik Boisse; France	Valentina Vezzali; Italy	Tan Xue; China	Na Li; China
2008	Andrea Cassarà; Italy	Luigi Tarantino; Italy	Matteo Tagliariol; Italy	Valentina Vezzali; Italy	Rebecca Ward; United States	Ana Maria Brânză; Romania
2009	Andrea Baldini; Italy	Nicolas Limbach; Germany	Gauthier Grumier; France	Arianna Errigo; Italy	Mariel Zagunis; United States	Ana Maria Brânză; Romania
2010	Lei Sheng; China	Nicolas Limbach; Germany	Gauthier Grumier; France	Valentina Vezzali; Italy	Mariel Zagunis; United States	Emese Szász; Hungary
2011	Andrea Cassarà; Italy	Aleksey Yakimenko; Russia	Paolo Pizzo; Italy	Elisa Di Francisca; Italy	Mariel Zagunis; United States	Sun Yujie; China
2012	Andrea Cassarà; Italy	Nicolas Limbach; Germany	Nikolai Novosjolov; Estonia	Arianna Errigo; Italy	Mariel Zagunis; United States	Sun Yujie; China
2013	Andrea Cassarà; Italy	Veniamin Reshetnikov; Russia	Rubén Limardo; Venezuela	Arianna Errigo; Italy	Olha Kharlan; Ukraine	Ana Maria Brânză; Romania
2014	Ma Jianfei; China	Gu Bon-gil; South Korea	Ulrich Robeiri; France	Arianna Errigo; Italy	Olha Kharlan; Ukraine	Emese Szász; Hungary
2015	Race Imboden; United States	Gu Bon-gil; South Korea	Gauthier Grumier; France	Elisa Di Francisca; Italy	Sofiya Velikaya; Russia	Rossella Fiamingo; Italy
2016	Alexander Massialas; United States	Kim Jung-hwan; South Korea	Gauthier Grumier; France	Arianna Errigo; Italy	Sofiya Velikaya; Russia	Emese Szász; Hungary
2017	Alexander Massialas; United States	Gu Bon-gil; South Korea	Yannick Borel; France	Inna Deriglazova; Russia	Anna Márton; Hungary	Violetta Kolobova; Russia
2018	Alessio Foconi; Italy	Eli Dershwitz; United States	Yannick Borel; France	Inna Deriglazova; Russia	Olha Kharlan; Ukraine	Mara Navarria; Italy
2019	Alessio Foconi; Italy	Oh Sang-uk; South Korea	Kazuyasu Minobe; Japan	Inna Deriglazova; Russia	Olha Kharlan; Ukraine	Vivian Kong; Hong Kong
2020	Alessio Foconi; Italy	Oh Sang-uk; South Korea	Sergey Bida; Russia	Inna Deriglazova; Russia	Olha Kharlan; Ukraine	Ana Maria Popescu; Romania
2021	Alessio Foconi; Italy	Áron Szilágyi; Hungary	Ihor Reizlin; Ukraine	Inna Deriglazova; Russia	Olha Kharlan; Ukraine	Ana Maria Popescu; Romania
2022	Tommaso Marini; Italy	Áron Szilágyi; Hungary	Romain Cannone; France	Lee Kiefer; United States	Anna Bashta; Azerbaijan	Choi In-jeong; South Korea
2023	Alexander Massialas; United States	Sandro Bazadze; Georgia	Davide Di Veroli; Italy	Lee Kiefer; United States	Sara Balzer; France	Marie-Florence Candassamy; France
2024	Cheung Ka Long; Hong Kong	Oh Sang-uk; South Korea	Koki Kano; Japan	Lee Kiefer; United States	Sara Balzer; France	Kong Man Wai; Hong Kong
2025	Choi Chun Yin Ryan; Hong Kong	Jean-Philippe Patrice; France	Gergely Siklósi; Hungary	Lee Kiefer; United States	Misaki Emura; Japan	Song Se-ra; South Korea
2026	Alexander Choupenitch Czech Republic	Sébastien Patrice France	Mohamed El-Sayed Egypt	Martina Favaretto Italy	Yana Egorian Russia	Alberta Santuccio Italy

==== Junior ====
Edition	Men			Women		
Edition	Foil	Sabre	Épée	Foil	Sabre	Épée
2020	Kirill Borodachev; Authorised Neutral Athletes	Luca Fioretto; Italy	Giulio Gaetani; Italy	Martina Favaretto; Italy	Benedetta Taricco; Italy	Gaia Traditi; Italy
2021	Armand Spichiger; France	Kirill Tiuliukov; Authorised Neutral Athletes	Kendrick Jean Joseph; France	Nicole Pustilnik; Israel	Dariya Drozd; Russia	Veronika Bieleszova; Czech Republic
2022	Chase Emmer; United States	Colin Heathcock; United States	Zsombor Keszthelyi; Hungary	Lauren Scruggs; United States	Sugar Katinka Battai; Hungary	Hadley Husisian; United States
2023	Damiano Di Veroli; Italy	Colin Heathcock; United States	Mohamede Elsayed; Egypt	Aurora Grandis; Italy	Nisanur Erbil; Turkey	Hadley Husisian; United States
2024	Chase Emmer; United States	Vlad Covaliu; Romania	Samuel Imrek; United States	Vittoria Pinna; Italy	Luisa Fernanda Herrera Lara; Uzbekistan	Leehi Machulsky; United States
2025	Abdelrahman Tolba; Egypt	Vlad Covaliu; Romania	Mahmoud Elsayed; Egypt	Matilde Molinari; Italy	Gulistan Perdibaeva; Uzbekistan	Anna Maksymenko; Ukraine
2026	Emanuale Iaquinta Italy	Furkan Yaman Turkey	Chen Bing-Jyun Chinese Taipei	Jaelyn Liu United States	Pan Qimiao China	Elle Meihui Koh Singapore

== Team World Cup ==
=== Senior ===
Year	Men's foil	Women's foil	Men's épée	Women's épée	Men's sabre	Women's sabre
2000	Cuba	Germany	Italy	Hungary	Hungary	France
2001	–					
2002	Germany	Romania	Austria	Germany	Hungary	Romania
2003	Italy	Italy	France	France	Russia	United States
2004	Germany	Poland	France	France	France	Romania
2005	France	Russia	France	Russia	Italy	Russia
2006	France	Russia	France	France	France	Russia
2007	Germany	Russia	France	France	Hungary	France
2008	Italy	Russia	France	China	France	United States
2009	Italy	Italy	Hungary	Italy	Italy	Ukraine
2010	Italy	Italy	Hungary	Poland	Italy	Russia
2011	Italy	Italy	France	Romania	Russia	Russia
2012	Italy	Italy	United States	Russia	Russia	Russia
2013	United States	Italy	Hungary	China	Russia	Ukraine
2014	France	Italy	France	Russia	Russia	United States
2015	Russia	Russia	France	China	Italy	Russia
2016	United States	Russia	France	Romania	Russia	Russia
2017	France	Italy	France	China	South Korea	Italy
2018	United States	Italy	South Korea	United States	South Korea	France
2019	United States	Russia	Russia	Russia	South Korea	France
2020	United States	Russia	France	China	South Korea	Russia
2021	United States	Russia	Japan	Poland	South Korea	Russia
2022	Italy	Italy	France	South Korea	South Korea	France
2023	Japan	Italy	France	South Korea	South Korea	France
2024	Italy	Italy	Japan	Italy	South Korea	France
2025	Italy	Italy	Japan	Italy	Hungary	France
2026	Italy	Italy	Switzerland	South Korea	France	France

=== Junior ===
Year	Men's foil	Women's foil	Men's épée	Women's épée	Men's sabre	Women's sabre
2020	Italy	Russia	United States	Russia	Italy	Hungary
2021	United States	Russia	Russia	Russia	Egypt	Russia
2022	Italy	United States	Egypt	Israel	Egypt	France
2023	United States	United States	Egypt	Poland	Uzbekistan	Hungary
2024	United States	Italy	Italy	United States	United States	Uzbekistan
2025	Italy	Italy; United States	Egypt	Ukraine	United States	Uzbekistan
2026	China	China	United States	China	United States	Russia

== See also ==
- Fencing at the Summer Olympics
- World Fencing Championships
- Asian Fencing Championships
- European Fencing Championships
