= 2017–18 Fencing World Cup =

International fencing competition

2017-2018 Fencing World Cup
- Edition: 47th
- Duration: September 2017-May 2018

The 47th FIE Fencing World Cup began in October 2017 and concluded in July 2018 at the 2018 World Fencing Championships held in Wuxi. Of the 153 national federations in the International Fencing Federation (FIE), 108 were represented in Wuxi with 771 athletes participating

== Individual épée ==
=== Top 8 ===
Men
1	(France) Yannick Borel	214
2	(Ukraine) Bogdan Nikishin	211
3	(South Korea) Park Sang-young	179
4	(Venezuela) Rubén Limardo	146
5	(South Korea) Jung Jin-sun	141
6	(Switzerland) Max Heinzer	126
7	(Estonia) Nikolai Novosjolov	101
8	(Kazakhstan) Dmitriy Aleksanin	93.5

Women
1	(Italy) Mara Navarria	221
2	(Romania) Ana Maria Popescu	179
3	(Hungary) Emese Szász	158
4	(Ukraine) Olena Kryvytska	132
5	(China) Sun Yiwen	126
6	(South Korea) Kang Young-mi	124
7	(South Korea) Choi In-jeong	113
8	(Estonia) Katrina Lehis	109

== Individual foil ==
=== Top 8 ===
Men
1	(Italy) Alessio Foconi	218
2	(United Kingdom) Richard Kruse	200
3	(United States) Race Imboden	192
4	(Italy) Andrea Cassara	154
5	(Russia) Race Imboden	151
6	(Russia) Alexey Cheremisinov	147
7	(Italy) Daniele Garozzo	147
8	(United States) Alexander Massialas	143

Women
1	(Russia) Inna Deriglazova	291
2	(Italy) Alice Volpi	254
3	(United States) Lee Kiefer	203
4	(Tunisia) Ines Boubakri	159
5	(Italy) Arianna Errigo	148
6	(France) Ysaora Thibus]	134
7	(Canada) Eleanor Harvey	128
8	(Germany) Leonie Ebert	113

== Individual sabre ==
=== Top 8 ===
Men
1	(United States) Eli Dershwitz	249
2	(South Korea) Gu Bon-gil	197
3	(South Korea) Kim Jung-hwan	195
4	(Hungary) Áron Szilágyi	189
5	(South Korea) Oh Sang-uk	178
6	(Russia) Kamil Ibragimov	173
7	(Italy) Luca Curatoli	156
8	(Hungary) András Szatmári	139

Women
1	(Ukraine) Olga Kharlan	190
2	(Russia) Sofya Velikaya	175
3	(Hungary) Anna Márton	159
4	(France) Cécilia Berder	159
5	(Romania) Bianca Pascu	155
6	(Russia) Yana Egorian	140
7	(South Korea) Kim Ji-yeon	128
8	(Russia) Sofia Pozdniakova	128

== Team épée ==
=== Top 8 ===
Men
1	South Korea	360
2	Russia	322
3	France	308
4	Switzerland	290
5	Italy	270
6	Hungary	244
7	United States	224
8	China	211

Women
1	United States	346
2	South Korea	316
3	Russia	306
4	France	288
5	China	282
6	Italy	262
7	Poland	256
8	Estonia	232

== Team foil ==
=== Top 8 ===
Men
1	United States	424
2	Italy	356
3	South Korea	308
4	Russia	300
5	France	256
6	Japan	226
7	Poland	193
8	Hong Kong	192

Women
1	Italy	388
2	Russia	360
3	United States	344
4	France	284
5	South Korea	243
6	Canada	227
7	Japan	227
8	Germany	214

== Team sabre ==
=== Top 8 ===
Men
1	South Korea	424
2	Italy	364
3	Hungary	304
4	Germany	258
5	Iran	258
6	Russia	232
7	United States	228
8	France	202

Women
1	France	388
2	Russia	364
3	Italy	312
4	South Korea	304
5	United States	260
6	China	230
7	Ukraine	223
8	Hungary	204
