= Roman Svichkar =

Ukrainian fencer (born 1993)

Roman Yuliyovych Svichkar
Personal information
- Full name: Roman Yuriiovych Svichkar
- Born: 23 June 1993 (age 33)

Fencing career
- Sport: Fencing
- Country: Ukraine
- Weapon: Épée
- Hand: left-handed
Medal record
Men's épée
Representing Ukraine
World Championships
Silver medal – second place	2019 Budapest	Team
Silver medal – second place	2026 Hong Kong	Team
Bronze medal – third place	2018 Wuxi	Individual
European Championships
Gold medal – first place	2025 Genova	Individual
Bronze medal – third place	2026 Antony	Team
Military Games
Bronze medal – third place	2019 Wuhan	Team

Roman Yuliyovych Svichkar (Ukrainian: Роман Юрійович Свічкар, romanized: Roman Julijovych Svičkar; born 18 June 1993) is a Ukrainian épée fencer, bronze medallist in the 2018 World Fencing Championships.

== Career ==
Roman Svichkar represented Ukraine at the 2010 Summer Youth Olympics in Singapore, where he was 12th in individual event.

Svichkar earned a place in the national team in 2017. Since then he participates in different international senior competitions. On May 13, 2018, he won his first ever World Cup medal which was bronze in team event in Paris. At the 2018 European Fencing Championships he was 19th in individual competition and 5th in team.

He surprised at the 2018 World Fencing Championships in Wuxi, China, where he won bronze having beaten the reigning at that time World Champion Paolo Pizzo from Italy.

== Personal life ==
Svichkar is a student at the H.S. Skovoroda Kharkiv National Pedagogical University.
