= Tristan Tulen =

Dutch fencer (born 1991)

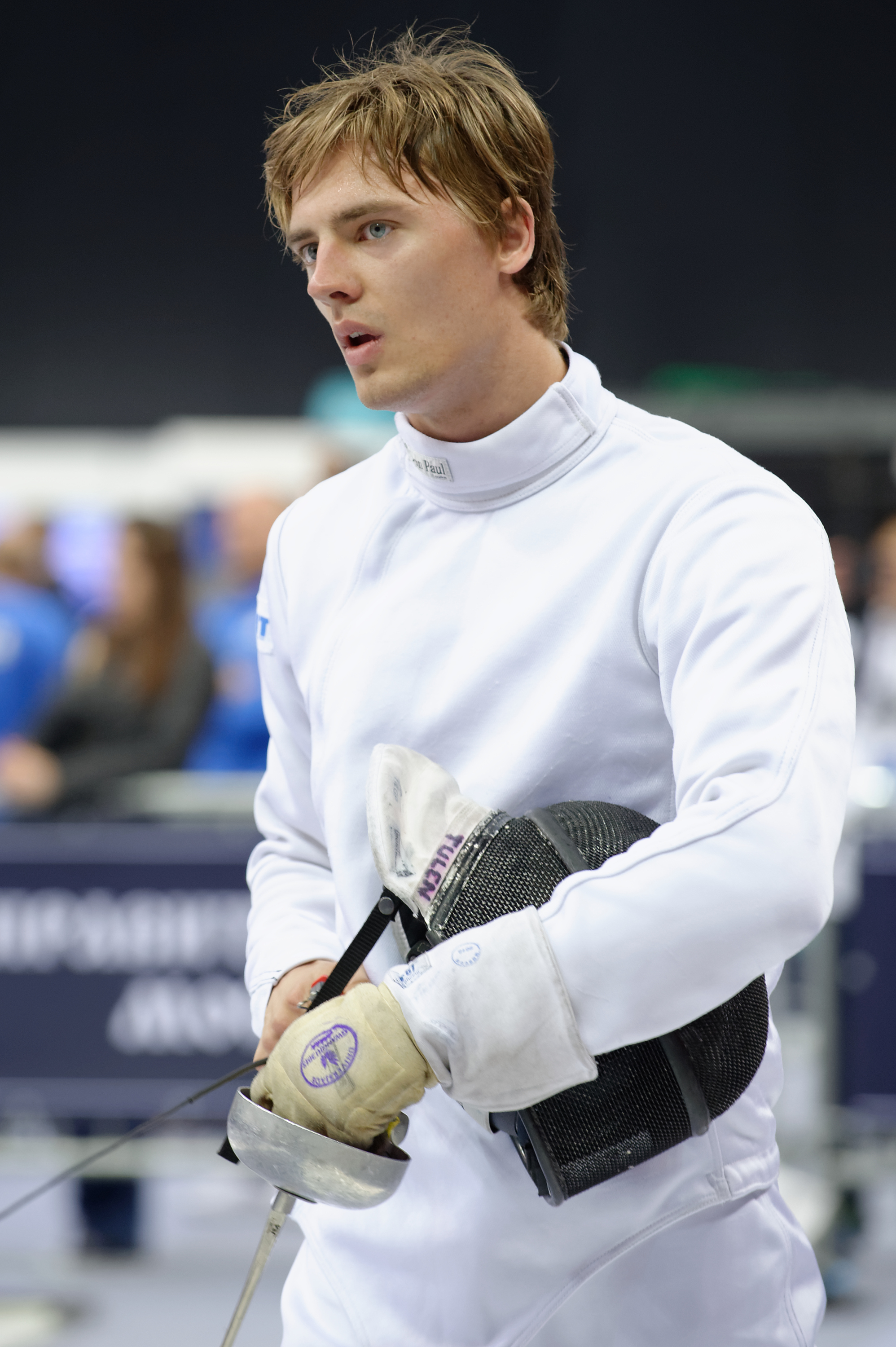
- Tulen in 2015

Personal information
- Born: 22 July 1991 (age 35)

Fencing career
- Sport: Fencing
- Country: Netherlands
- Weapon: Épée
- Hand: Left-handed
Medal record
Men's épée
Representing the Netherlands
European Games
Gold medal – first place	2023 Kraków–Małopolska	Individual
European Championships
Silver medal – second place	2022 Antalya	Individual
Silver medal – second place	2025 Genoa	Team
Summer Universiade
Bronze medal – third place	2013 Kazan	Individual

Tristan Tulen (born 22 July 1991) is a Dutch left-handed épée fencer. He won the silver medal in the men's épée event at the 2022 European Fencing Championships held in Antalya, Turkey. He also won the gold medal in his event at the 2023 European Games held in Poland.

== Career ==
Tulen won one of the bronze medals in the men's épée event at the 2013 Summer Universiade held in Kazan, Russia. He also competed in the men's individual épée and men's team épée events at the 2017 Summer Universiade held in Taipei, Taiwan.

Tulen competed in several editions of the men's épée event at the World Fencing Championships. He competed in the men's épée event at the 2011 World Fencing Championships and in the same event at the 2013 World Fencing Championships. A few years later, he also competed in the men's épée event at the 2017 World Fencing Championships and in the same event at the 2018 World Fencing Championships. At the Grand Prix of Cali, Colombia in 2019, he won a bronze medal. In 2022, he won the silver medal in the men's épée event at the European Fencing Championships held in Antalya, Turkey.

== Personal life ==
His brother Rafaël Tulen is also a competitive fencer.
