= Peeter Turnau =

Estonian fencer

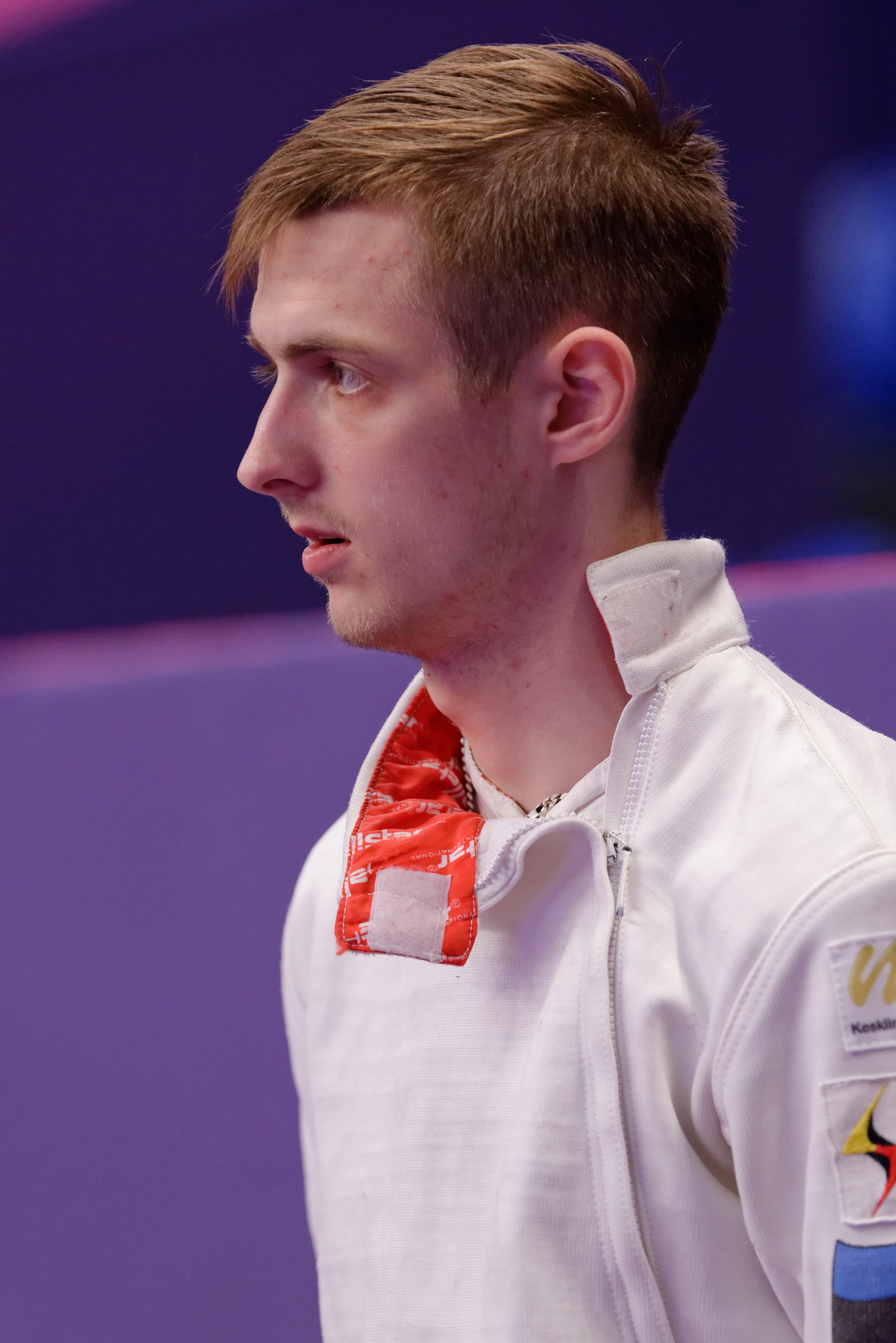
Peeter Turnau

Peeter Turnau (born 30 August 1994) is an Estonian fencer.

He was born in Haapsalu. In 2016 he graduated from Tallinn University of Technology.

He began his fencing career in 2004, coached by his father. Since 2015 his coach is also Jaanus Veske. He won silver medal at 2015 European Fencing Championships in team épée. He is 3-times Estonian champion. Since 2012 he is a member of Estonian national fencing team.
