= Jacob Hoyle =

American fencer

Personal information
- Nationality: United States
- Born: April 15, 1994 (age 32) New York City, United States

Sport
- Sport: Fencing
- Event: épée
- College team: Columbia University

Jacob Hoyle (born April 15, 1994) is an American épée fencer. He competed in the 2020 Summer Olympics.

Hoyle was born in New York City to Charlie and Suzy Hoyle, and is Jewish. He attended Strath Haven High School where he excelled in academics and music. He fenced in college for Columbia University ('16) where he earned two NCAA Mens Epee individual titles and contributed to back to back team titles for Columbia with Coach Michael Aufrictig. Jacob was honored at graduation with the Student Athlete award and was named the Connie S. Maniatty Outstanding Male Senior Student-Athlete Award winner and James Murray Memorial Trophy winner as team captain in his senior year.

Jacob worked tirelessly to qualify and compete representing the United States at the 2021 Tokyo Olympics.
