= Men's sabre at the 2022 World Fencing Championships =

Men's sabre at the Fencing championships 2022
- Venue: Cairo Stadium Indoor Halls Complex
- Location: Cairo, Egypt
- Dates: 15 July (qualification); 18 July
- Competitors: 143 from 49 nations

Medalists
| gold medal | Áron Szilágyi | Hungary |
| silver medal | Maxime Pianfetti | France |
| bronze medal | Iulian Teodosiu | Romania |
| bronze medal | Sandro Bazadze | Georgia |

The Men's sabre competition at the 2022 World Fencing Championships was held on 18 July 2022. The qualification was held on 15 July.

== Draw ==
=== Finals ===
Semifinals
(France) Maxime Pianfetti | 15
(Romania) Iulian Teodosiu | 11
(Georgia (country)) Sandro Bazadze | 11
(Hungary) Áron Szilágyi | 15

Final
(France) Maxime Pianfetti | 14
(Hungary) Áron Szilágyi | 15

=== Top half ===
==== Section 1 ====
Round of 64
(South Korea) Kim Jung-hwan | 15
(Vietnam) Nguyễn Xuân Lợi | 11
(Hong Kong) Aaron Ho | 12
(France) Maxime Pianfetti | 15
(South Korea) Kim Jun-ho | 15
(Poland) Szymon Hryciuk | 8
(Ukraine) Yuriy Tsap | 15
(Egypt) Mohamed Amer | 12
(United States) Eli Dershwitz | 15
(Iran) Mohammad Fotouhi | 6
(China) Lin Xiao | 13
(Italy) Michele Gallo | 15
(Egypt) Ziad El-Sissy | 15
(Iran) Mohammad Rahbari | 10
(Vietnam) Nguyễn Văn Quyết | 5
(Italy) Luigi Samele | 15

Round of 32
(South Korea) Kim Jung-hwan | 13
(France) Maxime Pianfetti | 15
(South Korea) Kim Jun-ho | 15
(Ukraine) Yuriy Tsap | 12
(United States) Eli Dershwitz | 12
(Italy) Michele Gallo | 15
(Egypt) Ziad El-Sissy | 14
(Italy) Luigi Samele | 15

Round of 16
(France) Maxime Pianfetti | 15
(South Korea) Kim Jun-ho | 8
(Italy) Michele Gallo | 12
(Italy) Luigi Samele | 15

Quarterfinals
(France) Maxime Pianfetti | 15
(Italy) Luigi Samele | 14

==== Section 2 ====
Round of 64
(Italy) Luca Curatoli | 15
(United States) Khalil Thompson | 8
(Ukraine) Vasyl Humen | 13
(Uzbekistan) Musa Aymuratov | 15
(Germany) Lorenz Kempf | 12
(Canada) Shaul Gordon | 15
(Kuwait) Bandar Al-Shamlan | 5
(Romania) Iulian Teodosiu | 15
(Germany) Matyas Szabo | 15
(France) Sébastien Patrice | 11
(Japan) Kento Hoshino | 15
(Japan) Kento Yoshida | 11
(Japan) Kaito Streets | 13
(Ukraine) Andriy Yahodka | 15
(India) Karan Singh | 6
(South Korea) Oh Sang-uk | 15

Round of 32
(Italy) Luca Curatoli | 15
(Uzbekistan) Musa Aymuratov | 6
(Canada) Shaul Gordon | 13
(Romania) Iulian Teodosiu | 15
(Germany) Matyas Szabo | 15
(Japan) Kento Hoshino | 9
(Ukraine) Andriy Yahodka | 2
(South Korea) Oh Sang-uk | 15

Round of 16
(Italy) Luca Curatoli | 14
(Romania) Iulian Teodosiu | 15
(Germany) Matyas Szabo | 12
(South Korea) Oh Sang-uk | 15

Quarterfinals
(Romania) Iulian Teodosiu | 15
(South Korea) Oh Sang-uk | 14

=== Bottom half ===
==== Section 3 ====
Round of 64
(Georgia (country)) Sandro Bazadze | 15
(Germany) Frederic Kindler | 8
(Hungary) Csanád Gémesi | 15
(Spain) Iñaki Bravo | 13
(Georgia (country)) Beka Bazadze | 14
(China) Shen Chenpeng | 15
(Spain) Andrés Hernández | 7
(Tunisia) Farès Ferjani | 15
(Iran) Ali Pakdaman | 15
(Spain) Óscar Fernández | 11
(Kazakhstan) Artyom Sarkissyan | 15
(Germany) Raoul Bonah | 5
(Tunisia) Ahmed Ferjani | 14
(Hungary) Tamás Decsi | 15
(France) Eliott Bibi | 6
(France) Boladé Apithy | 15

Round of 32
(Georgia (country)) Sandro Bazadze | 15
(Hungary) Csanád Gémesi | 12
(China) Shen Chenpeng | 15
(Tunisia) Farès Ferjani | 10
(Iran) Ali Pakdaman | 15
(Kazakhstan) Artyom Sarkissyan | 14
(Hungary) Tamás Decsi | 11
(France) Boladé Apithy | 15

Round of 16
(Georgia (country)) Sandro Bazadze | 15
(China) Shen Chenpeng | 5
(Iran) Ali Pakdaman | 15
(France) Boladé Apithy | 7

Quarterfinals
(Georgia (country)) Sandro Bazadze | 15
(Iran) Ali Pakdaman | 12

==== Section 4 ====
Round of 64
(South Korea) Gu Bon-gil | 15
(China) Yan Yinghui | 8
(Italy) Pietro Torre | 15
(Egypt) Adham Moataz | 7
(United States) Andrew Mackiewicz | 12
(Romania) Răzvan Ursachi | 15
(Canada) Fares Arfa | 15
(United States) Daryl Homer | 14
(Hungary) András Szatmári | 15
(Poland) Krzysztof Kaczkowski | 4
(United Kingdom) William Deary | 12
(Turkey) Enver Yıldırım | 15
(Hong Kong) Low Ho Tin | 10
(China) Xu Yingming | 15
(Kuwait) Amaar Al-Ammari | 6
(Hungary) Áron Szilágyi | 15

Round of 32
(South Korea) Gu Bon-gil | 14
(Italy) Pietro Torre | 15
(Romania) Răzvan Ursachi | 13
(Canada) Fares Arfa | 15
(Hungary) András Szatmári | 15
(Turkey) Enver Yıldırım | 7
(China) Xu Yingming | 13
(Hungary) Áron Szilágyi | 15

Round of 16
(Italy) Pietro Torre | 15
(Canada) Fares Arfa | 8
(Hungary) András Szatmári | 9
(Hungary) Áron Szilágyi | 15

Quarterfinals
(Italy) Pietro Torre | 8
(Hungary) Áron Szilágyi | 15
