= Men's sabre at the 2018 World Fencing Championships =

- Venue: Wuxi Sports Center Indoor Stadium
- Location: Wuxi, China
- Dates: 19 July (qualification); 22 July
- Competitors: 120 from 44 nations

Medalists
gold medal	Kim Jung-hwan	South Korea
silver medal	Eli Dershwitz	United States
bronze medal	Kamil Ibragimov	Russia
bronze medal	Kim Jun-ho	South Korea

The Men's sabre event of the 2018 World Fencing Championships was held on 22 July 2018. The qualification was held on 19 July 2018.

== Draw ==
=== Finals ===
Semifinals
(South Korea) Kim Jung-hwan	15
(Russia) Kamil Ibragimov	13
(United States) Eli Dershwitz	15
(South Korea) Kim Jun-ho	14

Final
(South Korea) Kim Jung-hwan	15
(United States) Eli Dershwitz	11

=== Top half ===
==== Section 1 ====
Round of 64
(South Korea) Gu Bon-gil	15
(Egypt) Mohamed Amer	6
(China) Lu Yang	12
(Canada) Shaul Gordon	15
(Germany) Richard Hübers	15
(Japan) Tomohiro Shimamura	11
(Hong Kong) Low Ho Tin	14
(Italy) Luigi Samele	15
(South Korea) Kim Jung-hwan	15
(Poland) Jakub Ociński	12
(Canada) Fares Arfa	10
(Romania) Tiberiu Dolniceanu	15
(Italy) Aldo Montano	13
(France) Maxence Lambert	15
(United Kingdom) Jonathan Webb	8
(Italy) Luca Curatoli	15

Round of 32
(South Korea) Gu Bon-gil	15
(Canada) Shaul Gordon	5
(Germany) Richard Hübers	11
(Italy) Luigi Samele	15
(South Korea) Kim Jung-hwan	15
(Romania) Tiberiu Dolniceanu	11
(France) Maxence Lambert	9
(Italy) Luca Curatoli	15

Round of 16
(South Korea) Gu Bon-gil	15
(Italy) Luigi Samele	5
(South Korea) Kim Jung-hwan	15
(Italy) Luca Curatoli	10

Quarterfinals
(South Korea) Gu Bon-gil	10
(South Korea) Kim Jung-hwan	15

==== Section 2 ====
Round of 64
(Russia) Kamil Ibragimov	15
(Belgium) Arne De Ridder	10
(Romania) Iulian Teodosiu	15
(Belarus) Kiryl Kirpichou	10
(China) Xu Yingming	15
(Argentina) Pascual Di Tella	6
(Argentina) Stefano Lucchetti	6
(Germany) Max Hartung	15
(Italy) Enrico Berrè	15
(Georgia (country)) Beka Bazadze	8
(Germany) Matyas Szabo	14
(Russia) Dmitriy Danilenko	15
(Russia) Konstantin Lokhanov	9
(Japan) Kento Yoshida	15
(Kazakhstan) Nurzhan Karim	7
(Hungary) András Szatmári	15

Round of 32
(Russia) Kamil Ibragimov	15
(Romania) Iulian Teodosiu	10
(China) Xu Yingming	14
(Germany) Max Hartung	15
(Italy) Enrico Berrè	15
(Russia) Dmitriy Danilenko	12
(Japan) Kento Yoshida	13
(Hungary) András Szatmári	15

Round of 16
(Russia) Kamil Ibragimov	15
(Germany) Max Hartung	7
(Italy) Enrico Berrè	13
(Hungary) András Szatmári	15

Quarterfinals
(Russia) Kamil Ibragimov	15
(Hungary) András Szatmári	9

=== Bottom half ===
==== Section 3 ====
Round of 64
(United States) Eli Dershwitz	15
(Ukraine) Dmytro Pundyk	4
(China) Yan Yinghui	15
(Iran) Farzad Baher	9
(Germany) Benedikt Wagner	15
(Venezuela) Eliecer Romero	9
(Ukraine) Oleksiy Statsenko	11
(Russia) Veniamin Reshetnikov	15
(France) Boladé Apithy	15
(Egypt) Mohab Samer	9
(China) Wang Shi	13
(France) Tom Seitz	15
(Georgia (country)) Sandro Bazadze	9
(Romania) Alin Badea	15
(Turkey) Enver Yıldırım	13
(Hungary) Áron Szilágyi	15

Round of 32
(United States) Eli Dershwitz	15
(China) Yan Yinghui	12
(Germany) Benedikt Wagner	15
(Russia) Veniamin Reshetnikov	13
(France) Boladé Apithy	15
(France) Tom Seitz	9
(Romania) Alin Badea	11
(Hungary) Áron Szilágyi	15

Round of 16
(United States) Eli Dershwitz	15
(Germany) Benedikt Wagner	14
(France) Boladé Apithy	10
(Hungary) Áron Szilágyi	15

Quarterfinals
(United States) Eli Dershwitz	15
(Hungary) Áron Szilágyi	11

==== Section 4 ====
Round of 64
(France) Vincent Anstett	15
(Singapore) Fong Zheng Jie	4
(South Korea) Kim Jun-ho	15
(United States) Geoffrey Loss	13
(Iran) Mojtaba Abedini	14
(Ukraine) Andriy Yahodka	15
(Hong Kong) Lam Hin Chung	13
(Iran) Ali Pakdaman	15
(United States) Daryl Homer	15
(Israel) Kostiantyn Voronov	7
(Hungary) Csanád Gémesi	15
(United Kingdom) James Honeybone	13
(Romania) George Dragomir	10
(Tunisia) Farès Ferjani	15
(Japan) Kenta Tokunan	12
(South Korea) Oh Sang-uk	15

Round of 32
(France) Vincent Anstett	12
(South Korea) Kim Jun-ho	15
(Ukraine) Andriy Yahodka	12
(Iran) Ali Pakdaman	15
(United States) Daryl Homer	15
(Hungary) Csanád Gémesi	8
(Tunisia) Farès Ferjani	15
(South Korea) Oh Sang-uk	8

Round of 16
(South Korea) Kim Jun-ho	15
(Iran) Ali Pakdaman	14
(United States) Daryl Homer	13
(Tunisia) Farès Ferjani	15

Quarterfinals
(South Korea) Kim Jun-ho	15
(Tunisia) Farès Ferjani	13
