= Men's sabre at the 2023 World Fencing Championships =

Men's sabre at the Fencing championships 2023
- Venue: Milan Convention Center
- Location: Milan, Italy
- Dates: 22 July (qualification); 25 July
- Competitors: 172 from 59 nations

Medalists
gold medal	Eli Dershwitz	United States
silver medal	Sandro Bazadze	Georgia
bronze medal	Ziad El-Sissy	Egypt
bronze medal	Áron Szilágyi	Hungary

The Men's sabre competition at the 2023 World Fencing Championships was held on 25 July 2023. The qualification was held on 22 July.

== Draw ==
=== Finals ===
Semifinals
(Georgia (country)) Sandro Bazadze	15
(Egypt) Ziad El-Sissy	14
(United States) Eli Dershwitz	15
(Hungary) Áron Szilágyi	13

Final
(Georgia (country)) Sandro Bazadze	6
(United States) Eli Dershwitz	15

=== Top half ===
==== Section 1 ====
Round of 64
(Georgia (country)) Sandro Bazadze	15
(Germany) Luis Bonah	3
(Italy) Riccardo Nuccio	11
(Tunisia) Farès Ferjani	15
(Turkey) Enver Yıldırım	15
(China) Liang Jianhao	8
(United States) Mitchell Saron	15
(France) Sébastien Patrice	11
(South Korea) Oh Sang-uk	15
(India) Karan Singh Singh	14
(Uzbekistan) Zuhriddin Kodirov	7
(Japan) Kento Yoshida	15
(China) Lin Xiao	15
(Romania) George Dragomir	13
(Ukraine) Yuriy Tsap	7
(Germany) Matyas Szabo	15

Round of 32
(Georgia (country)) Sandro Bazadze	15
(Tunisia) Farès Ferjani	13
(Turkey) Enver Yıldırım	7
(United States) Mitchell Saron	15
(South Korea) Oh Sang-uk	12
(Japan) Kento Yoshida	15
(China) Lin Xiao	14
(Germany) Matyas Szabo	15

Round of 16
(Georgia (country)) Sandro Bazadze	15
(United States) Mitchell Saron	7
(Japan) Kento Yoshida	15
(Germany) Matyas Szabo	13

Quarterfinals
(Georgia (country)) Sandro Bazadze	15
(Japan) Kento Yoshida	9

==== Section 2 ====
Round of 64
(Hungary) András Szatmári	15
(Romania) Radu Nițu	10
(Hungary) Tamás Decsi	15
(Iran) Mohammad Rahbari	9
(Hungary) Csanád Gémesi	14
(Romania) Matei Cîdu	15
(Iceland) Andri Mateev	7
(Egypt) Ziad El-Sissy	15
(Italy) Michele Gallo	15
(Egypt) Adham Moataz	11
(Canada) Olivier Desrosiers	8
(United States) Colin Heathcock	15
(Canada) Shaul Gordon	15
(Japan) Kaito Streets	12
(Poland) Olaf Stasiak	7
(France) Maxime Pianfetti	15

Round of 32
(Hungary) András Szatmári	12
(Hungary) Tamás Decsi	15
(Romania) Matei Cîdu	11
(Egypt) Ziad El-Sissy	15
(Italy) Michele Gallo	15
(United States) Colin Heathcock	12
(Canada) Shaul Gordon	15
(France) Maxime Pianfetti	8

Round of 16
(Hungary) Tamás Decsi	13
(Egypt) Ziad El-Sissy	15
(Italy) Michele Gallo	15
(Canada) Shaul Gordon	13

Quarterfinals
(Egypt) Ziad El-Sissy	15
(Italy) Michele Gallo	14

=== Bottom half ===
==== Section 3 ====
Round of 64
(Italy) Luigi Samele	15
(Spain) Iñaki Bravo	13
(Kuwait) Yousef Al-Shamlan	15
(Ukraine) Vasyl Humen	14
(South Korea) Gu Bon-gil	15
(Poland) Piotr Szczepanik	8
(Iran) Mohammad Fotouhi	12
(United States) Eli Dershwitz	15
(Romania) Iulian Teodosiu	15
(Canada) Fares Arfa	12
(Hong Kong) Aaron Ho	15
(Egypt) Mohamed Amer	9
(Germany) Raoul Bonah	15
(Poland) Krzysztof Kaczkowski	11
(South Korea) Ha Han-sol	15
(France) Boladé Apithy	12

Round of 32
(Italy) Luigi Samele	15
(Kuwait) Yousef Al-Shamlan	9
(South Korea) Gu Bon-gil	14
(United States) Eli Dershwitz	15
(Romania) Iulian Teodosiu	14
(Hong Kong) Aaron Ho	15
(Germany) Raoul Bonah	9
(South Korea) Ha Han-sol	15

Round of 16
(Italy) Luigi Samele	6
(United States) Eli Dershwitz	15
(Hong Kong) Aaron Ho	12
(South Korea) Ha Han-sol	15

Quarterfinals
(United States) Eli Dershwitz	15
(South Korea) Ha Han-sol	10

==== Section 4 ====
Round of 64
(Iran) Ali Pakdaman	14
(India) Gisho Kumaresan	8
(Kazakhstan) Nazarbay Sattarkhan	15
(China) Shen Chenpeng	13
(Egypt) Medhat Moataz	15
(United Kingdom) William Deary	11
(Poland) Szymon Hryciuk	15
(South Korea) Kim Jun-ho	7
(Italy) Luca Curatoli	15
(Germany) Frederic Kindler	9
(United States) Andrew Doddo	13
(Japan) Kento Hoshino	15
(Ukraine) Andriy Yahodka	12
(Uzbekistan) Musa Aymuratov	15
(Georgia (country)) Beka Bazadze	4
(Hungary) Áron Szilágyi	15

Round of 32
(Iran) Ali Pakdaman	15
(Kazakhstan) Nazarbay Sattarkhan	14
(Egypt) Medhat Moataz	12
(Poland) Szymon Hryciuk	15
(Italy) Luca Curatoli	15
(Japan) Kento Hoshino	5
(Uzbekistan) Musa Aymuratov	4
(Hungary) Áron Szilágyi	15

Round of 16
(Iran) Ali Pakdaman	12
(Poland) Szymon Hryciuk	15
(Italy) Luca Curatoli	12
(Hungary) Áron Szilágyi	15

Quarterfinals
(Poland) Szymon Hryciuk	8
(Hungary) Áron Szilágyi	15
