= Fencing at 2013 World Combat Games – Men's Sabre Individual =

The Men's Sabre event of the 2013 World Combat Games was held in Saint Petersburg, Russia on 24 October.

== Medalists ==
Gold	Silver	Bronze
Gu Bon-gil (KOR)	Tiberiu Dolniceanu (ROU)	Áron Szilágyi (HUN)

== Athlete list ==
- (Belarus) Aliaksandr Buikevich
- (Spain) Fernando Casares
- (Romania) Tiberiu Dolniceanu
- (Hungary) Csanád Gémesi
- (South Korea) Gu Bon-gil
- (South Korea) Kim Jung-hwan
- (Russia) Nikolay Kovalev
- (Germany) Nicolas Limbach
- (Canada) Joseph Polossifakis
- (Russia) Veniamin Reshetnikov
- (Italy) Luigi Samele
- (Tunisia) Hichem Samandi
- (Hungary) Áron Szilágyi
- (Germany) Benedikt Wagner

== Results ==
Round of 16
(Germany) Nicolas Limbach	15
(South Korea) Luigi Samele	5
(Germany) Benedikt Wagner	15
(Spain) Fernando Casares	12
(Tunisia) Hichem Samandi	5
(Romania) Tiberiu Dolniceanu	15
(South Korea) Gu Bon-gil	15
(Canada) Joseph Polossifakis	6
(Hungary) Csanád Gémesi	4
(South Korea) Nikolay Kovalev	15
(Belarus) Aliaksandr Buikevich	13
(South Korea) Kim Jung-hwan	15

Quarterfinals
(Russia) Veniamin Reshetnikov	15
(Germany) Nicolas Limbach	8
(Germany) Benedikt Wagner	3
(Romania) Tiberiu Dolniceanu	15
(South Korea) Gu Bon-gil	15
(South Korea) Nikolay Kovalev	13
(South Korea) Kim Jung-hwan	10
(Hungary) Áron Szilágyi	15

Semifinals
(Russia) Veniamin Reshetnikov	11
(Romania) Tiberiu Dolniceanu	15
(South Korea) Gu Bon-gil	15
(Hungary) Áron Szilágyi	7

Final
(Romania) Tiberiu Dolniceanu	10
(South Korea) Gu Bon-gil	15

Third place
(Russia) Veniamin Reshetnikov	13
(Hungary) Áron Szilágyi	15
