= Men's team sabre at the 2022 World Fencing Championships =

- Venue: Cairo Stadium Indoor Halls Complex
- Location: Cairo, Egypt
- Dates: 20–21 July
- Teams: 32

Medalists
gold medal	Gu Bon-gil; Kim Jung-hwan; Kim Jun-ho; Oh Sang-uk	South Korea
silver medal	Tamás Decsi; Csanád Gémesi; András Szatmári; Áron Szilágyi	Hungary
bronze medal	Luca Curatoli; Michele Gallo; Luigi Samele; Pietro Torre	Italy

The Men's team sabre competition at the 2022 World Fencing Championships was held on 20 and 21 July 2022.

== Draw ==
=== Finals ===
Semifinals
South Korea	45
Germany	39
Italy	42
Hungary	45

Final
South Korea	45
Hungary	37
Third place
Germany	42
Italy	45

=== Top half ===
==== Section 1 ====
Round of 32
South Korea	45
Nepal	7
Poland	27
Ukraine	45
France	45
Saudi Arabia	22
India	24
Japan	45

Round of 16
South Korea	45
Ukraine	30
France	45
Japan	26

Quarterfinals
South Korea	45
France	39

==== Section 2 ====
Round of 32
United States	45
Singapore	20
China	45
Georgia	31
Canada	45
Brazil	24
Uzbekistan	28
Germany	45

Round of 16
United States	38
China	45
Canada	36
Germany	45

Quarterfinals
China	40
Germany	45

=== Bottom half ===
==== Section 3 ====
Round of 32
Italy	45
Iraq	24
Great Britain	39
Hong Kong	45
Tunisia	34
Colombia	45
Chile	25
Egypt	45

Round of 16
Italy	45
Hong Kong	23
Colombia	25
Egypt	45

Quarterfinals
Italy	45
Egypt	33

==== Section 4 ====
Round of 32
Iran	45
Kuwait	30
Turkey	45
Romania	42
Spain	45
Kazakhstan	36
Vietnam	30
Hungary	45

Round of 16
Iran	38
Turkey	45
Spain	33
Hungary	45

Quarterfinals
Turkey	30
Hungary	45

=== Placement rounds ===
==== 5–8th place bracket ====
5–8th place semifinals
France	45
China	39
Egypt	45
Turkey	24

Fifth place
France	45
Egypt	38
Seventh place
China	45
Turkey	24

==== 9–16th place bracket ====
9–16th place quarterfinals
Ukraine	45
Japan	43
United States	45
Canada	41
Hong Kong	44
Colombia	45
Iran	45
Spain	37

9–12th place semifinals
Ukraine
United States
Colombia	24
Iran	45

Ninth place
United States	42
Iran	45
Eleventh place
Ukraine	45
Colombia	36

==== 13–16th place bracket ====
13–16th place semifinals
Japan	41
Canada	45
Hong Kong	44
Spain	45

13th place
Canada	45
Spain	37
15th place
Japan	45
Hong Kong	35

== Final ranking ==
Rank	Team
1st place, gold medalist(s)	South Korea
2nd place, silver medalist(s)	Hungary
3rd place, bronze medalist(s)	Italy
4	Germany
5	France
6	Egypt
7	China
8	Turkey
9	Iran
10	United States
11	Ukraine
12	Colombia
13	Canada
14	Spain
15	Japan
16	Hong Kong
17	Romania
18	Tunisia
19	Georgia
20	Poland
21	Kazakhstan
22	Great Britain
23	Brazil
24	Saudi Arabia
25	India
26	Kuwait
27	Chile
28	Singapore
29	Uzbekistan
30	Iraq
31	Vietnam
32	Nepal
