= Men's team sabre at the 2014 World Fencing Championships =

The Men's team sabre event of the 2014 World Fencing Championships was held from 20–21 July 2014.

== Medalists ==
Gold	Germany; Max Hartung; Nicolas Limbach; Matyas Szabo; Benedikt Wagner
Silver	South Korea; Gu Bon-gil; Kim Jung-hwan; Oh Eun-seok; Won Woo-young
Bronze	Hungary; Tamás Decsi; Csanád Gémesi; András Szatmári; Áron Szilágyi

== Draw ==
=== Finals ===
Final
Germany	45
South Korea	41

Third place
Russia	43
Hungary	45

=== Top half ===
Round of 32
Poland	39
Japan	45
France	45
Georgia	31
Venezuela	44
Belarus	45
Argentina	45
Hong Kong	42
China	45
Kazakhstan	31

Round of 16
Russia	45
Japan	33
France	45
Belarus	30
United States	45
Argentina	31
China	35
Germany	45

Quarterfinals
Russia	45
France	34
United States	41
Germany	45

Semifinals
Russia	40
Germany	45

=== Bottom half ===
Round of 32
Spain	45
Great Britain	44
Canada	43
Mexico	45
Brazil	19
Ukraine	45
Iran	45
Egypt	37

Round of 16
South Korea	45
Spain	42
Mexico	26
Romania	45
Hungary	45
Ukraine	39
Iran	32
Italy	45

Quarterfinals
South Korea	45
Romania	41
Hungary	45
Italy	39

Semifinals
South Korea	45
Hungary	32

=== Placement rounds ===
==== 5–8th place ====
5–8th place semifinals
France	35
United States	45
Romania	34
Italy	45

5th place
United States	36
Italy	45
7th place
France	32
Romania	45

==== 9–16th place ====
9–16th place quarterfinals
Japan	37
Belarus	45
Argentina	25
China	45
Spain	45
Mexico	26
Ukraine	35
Iran	45

9–12th place semifinals
Belarus	45
China	33
Spain	44
Iran	45

9th place
Belarus	43
Iran	45
11th place
China	45
Spain	35

==== 13–16th place ====
13–16th place semifinals
Japan	45
Argentina	38
Mexico	29
Ukraine	45

13th place
Japan	42
Ukraine	45
15th place
Argentina	40
Mexico	45

== Final classification ==
Rank	Nation
1st place, gold medalist(s)	Germany
2nd place, silver medalist(s)	South Korea
3rd place, bronze medalist(s)	Hungary
4	Russia
5	Italy
6	United States
7	Romania
8	France
9	Iran
10	Belarus
11	China
12	Spain
13	Ukraine
14	Japan
15	Mexico
16	Argentina
17	Canada
18	Hong Kong
19	Great Britain
20	Poland
21	Egypt
22	Kazakhstan
23	Brazil
24	Georgia
25	Venezuela
