= Men's team sabre at the 2017 World Fencing Championships =

- Venue: Arena Leipzig
- Location: Leipzig, Germany
- Dates: 24 July

Medalists
gold medal	Gu Bon-gil; Kim Jun-ho; Kim Jung-hwan; Oh Sang-uk	South Korea
silver medal	Tamás Decsi; Csanád Gémesi; András Szatmári; Áron Szilágyi	Hungary
bronze medal	Enrico Berrè; Dario Cavaliere; Luca Curatoli; Luigi Samele	Italy

The Women's team foil event of the 2017 World Fencing Championships was held on 24 July 2017.

== Results ==
=== Championship bracket ===
Round of 32
Hong Kong	41
Canada	45
France	45
Vietnam	38
Thailand	17
Germany	45
Iran	45
Saudi Arabia	16
Colombia	30
Great Britain	45
Belarus	45
Chile	13
Guatemala	13
Hungary	45
Kazakhstan	25
China	45
Japan	45
Venezuela	38
FIE
Romania
United States	45
India	17
Singapore	18
Georgia	45
Ukraine	45
Poland	27

Round of 16
Italy	45
Canada	35
France	45
Germany	44
Iran	45
United Kingdom	29
Belarus	43
Hungary	45
South Korea	45
China	20
Japan	24
Romania	45
United States	45
Georgia	34
Ukraine	27
Russia	45

Quarterfinals
Italy	45
France	30
Iran	42
Hungary	45
South Korea	45
Romania	32
United States	45
Russia	38

Semifinals
Italy	44
Hungary	45
South Korea	45
United States	44

Final
Hungary	22
South Korea	45
Third place
Italy	45
United States	40

=== 5–8th place bracket ===
5–8th place semifinals
France	43
Iran	45
Romania	45
Russia	38

Fifth place
Iran	45
Romania	43
Seventh place
France	45
Russia	39

=== 9–16th place bracket ===
9–16th place quarterfinals
Canada	32
Germany	45
Great Britain	39
Belarus	45
China	45
Japan	44
Georgia	38
Ukraine	45

9–12th place semifinals
Germany	45
Belarus	33
China	38
Ukraine	45

Ninth place
Germany	45
Ukraine	28
Eleventh place
Belarus	43
China	45

=== 13–16th place bracket ===
13–16th place semifinals
Canada	45
Great Britain	42
Japan	29
Georgia	45

13th place
Canada	38
Georgia	45
15th place
Great Britain	41
Japan	45

== Final ranking ==
Rank	Team
Gold medal	South Korea
Silver medal	Hungary
Bronze medal	Italy
4	United States
5	Iran
6	Romania
7	France
8	Russia
9	Germany
10	Ukraine
11	China
12	Belarus
13	Georgia
14	Canada
15	Japan
16	Great Britain
17	Hong Kong
18	Poland
19	Kazakhstan
20	Chile
21	Colombia
22	Singapore
23	Vietnam
24	Thailand
25	India
26	Fédération Internationale d'Escrime
27	Saudi Arabia
28	Guatemala
