= Enver Yıldırım =

Turkish fencer (born 1995)

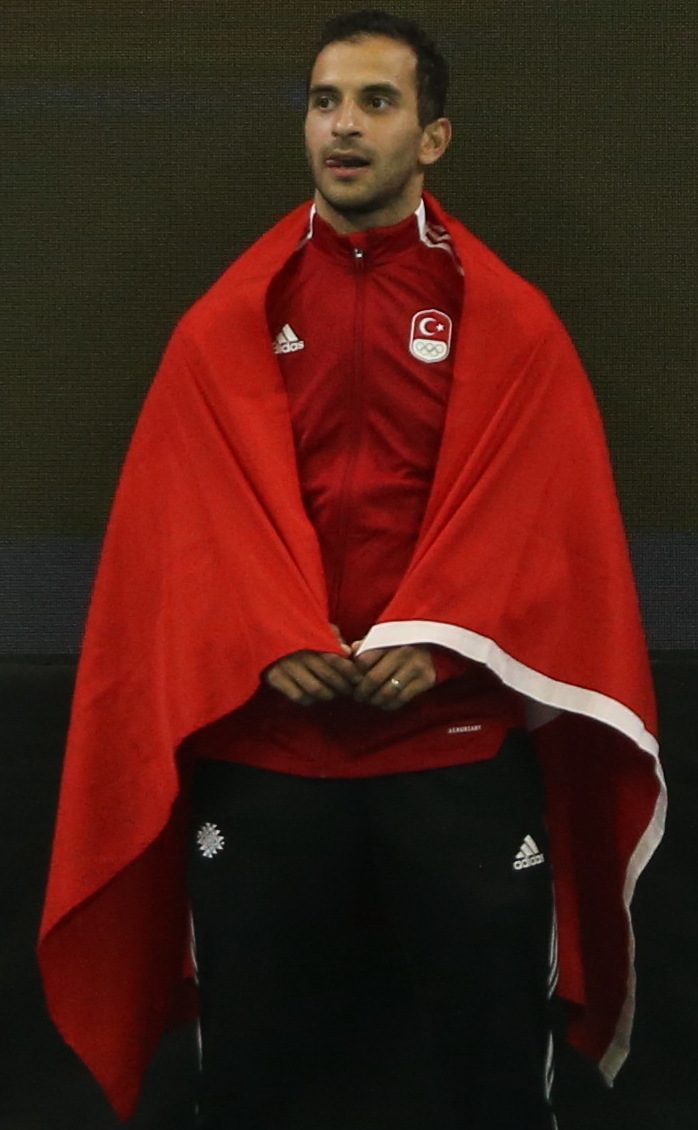
- Enver Yıldırım (2022)

Personal information
- Born: 18 October 1995 (age 30) Altındağ, Ankara, Turkey
- Education: Ankara University, Hacettepe University, Çanakkale Onsekiz Mart University
- Occupation: School teacher

Sport
- Sport: Fencing
- Event: Sabre
Medal record
Men's fencing
Representing Turkey
European Championships
Bronze medal – third place	2024 Basel	Team Sabre
Bronze medal – third place	2023 Plovdiv	Sabre
Bronze medal – third place	2022 Antalya	Team Sabre
World Cup
Gold medal – first place	2023 Ghent	Sabre
Bronze medal – third place	2024 Budapest	Sabre
Bronze medal – third place	2023 Tbilisi	Sabre
Bronze medal – third place	2021 Plovdiv	Sabre
Bronze medal – third place	2019 Plovdiv	Sabre
Islamic Solidarity Games
Gold medal – first place	2021 Konya	Sabre
Silver medal – second place	2021 Konya	Team Sabre
Mediterranean Games
Gold medal – first place	2026 Taranto	Individual Sabre
Summer Universiade
Silver medal – second place	2017 Taipei	Sabre
European U23 Championships
Bronze medal – third place	2017 Minsk	Sabre

Enver Yıldırım (born 18 October 1995) is a Turkish Olympian fencer who competes in the sabre event.

== Early years in fencing ==
Yıldırım started performing fencing in 2005. He was inspired by his older brothers who were trained by their neighbor fencing coach Mustafa Kalender.

In 2010, he was selected to the national youth team, and participated at the European Cadet Fencing Championships in Athens, Greece.

== Sport career ==
=== 2015 ===
Yıldırım took the bronze medal at the Tournoi satellite Meeting of 2014–15 Fencing World Cup in Istanbul, Turkey.

He took the bronze medal at the Normann Jørgensen Cup of the 2015–16 Fencing World Cup in Copenhagen, Denmark.

=== 2017 ===
He won the bronze medal at the 2017 European U23 Fencing Championships in Minsk, Belarus.

He received the silver medal in the individual sabre event at the 2017 Summer Universiade in Taipei, Republic of China

=== 2018 ===
He lost the Round of 64 match at the 2018 World Fencing Championships in Wuxi, China, and was eliminated.

=== 2019 ===
He competed at the 2019 World Fencing Championships in Budapest, Hungary, and was eliminated losing the match in the Round of 64.

He won the bronze medal at the Satellite Meeting of the 2019–20 Fencing World Cup in Plovdiv, Bulgaria. e

=== 2021 ===
He took the bronze medal at the Satellite Meeting of the 2021–22 Fencing World Cup in Plovdiv, Bulgaria.

=== 2022 ===
He won the bronze medal with teammates Tolga Aslan, Muhammed Anasız and Kerem Çağlayan in the Team Sabre event at the 2022 European Fencing Championships in Antalya, Turkey

Yıldırım captured the gold medal in the Individual Sabre event at the 2021 Islamic Solidarity Games in Konya, Turkey.

At the 2022 Mediterranean Games in Oran, Algeria, he lost the Round of 16 match and placed 11th.

He competed at the 2022 World Fencing Championships in Cairo, Egypt, and lost the Round of 32 match and placed 21st.

=== 2023 ===
In the Team Sabre event at the 2023 European Games in Kraków, Poland, he and his teammates Tolga Aslan, Ahmet Turgut Taflan and Furkan Yaman placed 10th.

He competed at the 2023 World Fencing Championships in Milan, Italy, and placed 21st losing the Round of 32 match.

He won the bronze medal at the 2023 European Fencing Championships in Plovdiv, Bulgaria.

Yıldırım captured the gold medal at the Tournoi satellite Meeting of the 2023–24 Fencing World Cup in Ghent, Belgium.

He took the bronze medal at the Tournoi satellite Meeting of the 2023–24 Fencing World Cup in Tbilisi, Georgia.

=== 2024 ===
He received the bronze medal at the Coupe du Monde Meeting of the 2023–24 Fencing World Cup in Budapest, Hungary.

Yıldırım won the bronze medal alongside Tolga Aslan, Muhammed Furkan Kalender and Furkan Yaman in the Team Sabre event at the 2024 European Fencing Championships in Basel, Switzerland.

Yıldırım won a quota in the Zonal Qualifying Tournament – Europe at the Fencing at the 2024 Summer Olympics – Qualification in Differdange, Luxembourg to represent his country at the 2024 Summer Olympics in Paris, France. He competed in the sabre individual event at the 2024 Paris Olympic Games, and was eliminated after losing the Round of 16 match.

He is a member of Olympia Fencing Club in Ankara. He is coached by Valeriy Shturbabin, his brother Hakan Yıldırım, Ahmet Ant and Emre Çokal. He trains at Eryaman Olympics Preparation Center in Ankara.

== Personal life ==
Enver Yıldırım was born to a Erzurum-origin mother and a Malatya-origin father in Altındağ district of Ankara, Turkey on 18 October 1995. He is the third oldest of four brothers. Yıldırım is married to Nergis Emanet.

He studied Physical Education in the Faculty of Sport Science at Ankara University, graduating in 2017. The same year, he entered Institute of Health Science at Hacettepe University for his postgraduate education in Sport Science and Technology. In 2020, he graduated as a Sport specialist. As of 2024, he is preparing a doctorate thesis in the Faculty of Sport Science at Çanakkale Onsekiz Mart University.

In 2019, he was appointed as a teacher of physical education at Ankara Adnan Menderes Anatolian İmam Hatip High School.
