= Men's team sabre at the 2019 World Fencing Championships =

Fencing Tournament

- Venue: SYMA Sports and Conference Centre
- Location: Budapest, Hungary
- Dates: 20–21 July

Medalists
gold medal	Gu Bon-gil; Ha Han-sol; Kim Jun-ho; Oh Sang-uk	South Korea
silver medal	Tamás Decsi; Csanád Gémesi; András Szatmári; Áron Szilágyi	Hungary
bronze medal	Enrico Berrè; Luca Curatoli; Aldo Montano; Luigi Samele	Italy

The Men's team sabre competition at the 2019 World Fencing Championships was held on 20 and 21 July 2019.

== Draw ==
=== Finals ===
Semifinals
South Korea	45
Germany	22
Hungary	45
Italy	38

Final
South Korea	45
Hungary	44
Third place
Germany	38
Italy	45

=== Top half ===
==== Section 1 ====
Round of 32
South Korea	45
Uzbekistan	15
Colombia	36
Great Britain	45
Romania	45
Belgium	29
Kuwait	20
United States	45

Round of 16
South Korea	45
Great Britain	32
Romania	45
United States	40

Quarterfinals
South Korea	45
Romania	34

==== Section 2 ====
Round of 32
Russia	45
Mexico	23
Thailand	42
Japan	45
Canada	45
Chile	30
Venezuela	31
Germany	45

Round of 16
Russia	45
Japan	24
Canada	42
Germany	45

Quarterfinals
Russia	43
Germany	45

=== Bottom half ===
==== Section 3 ====
Round of 32
Hungary	45
Vietnam	31
Argentina	9
Egypt	20
China	45
Kazakhstan	34
Spain	30
Iran	45

Round of 16
Hungary	45
Egypt	32
China	41
Iran	45

Quarterfinals
Hungary	45
Iran	29

==== Section 4 ====
Round of 32
France	45
Singapore	30
Australia	18
Georgia	45
Ukraine	45
Hong Kong	40
Czech Republic	14
Italy	45

Round of 16
France	42
Georgia	45
Ukraine	32
Italy	45

Quarterfinals
Georgia	33
Italy	45

=== Placement rounds ===
==== 5–8th place bracket ====
5–8th place semifinals
Romania	38
Russia	45
Iran	45
Georgia	42

Fifth place
Russia	45
Iran	33
Seventh place
Romania	33
Georgia	45

==== 9–16th place bracket ====
9–16th place quarterfinals
Great Britain	40
United States	45
Japan	45
Canada	42
Egypt	41
China	45
France	45
Ukraine	40

9–12th place semifinals
United States	40
Japan	37
China	39
France	45

Ninth place
United States	38
France	45
Eleventh place
Japan	31
China	45

==== 13–16th place bracket ====
13–16th place semifinals
Great Britain	45
Canada	32
Egypt	34
Ukraine	44

13th place
Great Britain	17
Ukraine	45
15th place
Canada	43
Egypt	45

== Final ranking ==
Rank	Team
1st place, gold medalist(s)	South Korea
2nd place, silver medalist(s)	Hungary
3rd place, bronze medalist(s)	Italy
4	Germany
5	Russia
6	Iran
7	Georgia
8	Romania
9	France
10	United States
11	China
12	Japan
13	Ukraine
14	Great Britain
15	Egypt
16	Canada
17	Colombia
18	Hong Kong
19	Argentina
20	Chile
21	Thailand
22	Kazakhstan
23	Australia
24	Belgium
25	Kuwait
26	Singapore
27	Spain
28	Mexico
29	Venezuela
30	Vietnam
31	Czech Republic
31	Uzbekistan
