= Men's team sabre at the 2015 World Fencing Championships =

The Men's team sabre event of the 2015 World Fencing Championships was held on 16–17 July 2015.

== Medalists ==
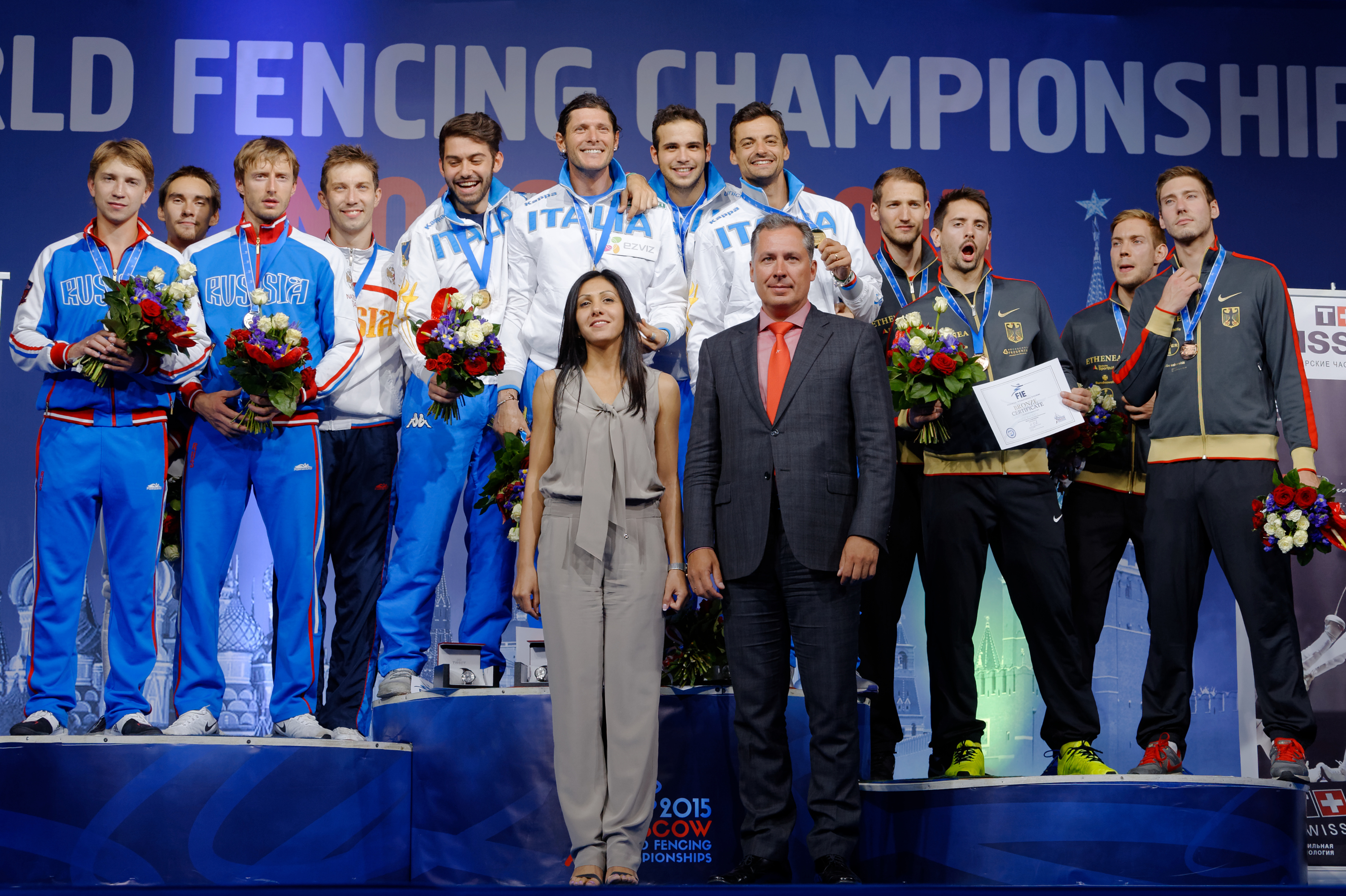
From left to right, Russia, Italy and Germany on the podium

Gold	Italy; Enrico Berrè; Luca Curatoli; Aldo Montano; Diego Occhiuzzi
Silver	Russia; Kamil Ibragimov; Nikolay Kovalev; Veniamin Reshetnikov; Aleksey Yakimenko
Bronze	Germany; Max Hartung; Nicolas Limbach; Matyas Szabo; Benedikt Wagner

== Draw ==
=== Finals ===
Final
Russia	36
Italy	45

Third place
Germany	45
France	30

=== Top half ===
Round of 32
Great Britain	45
Hong Kong	31
Iran	45
Venezuela	44
Turkey	36
United States	45
Hungary	45
Australia	16
Argentina	39
Ukraine	45
Spain	45
Kazakhstan	37
Kuwait	14
Russia	45

Round of 16
Germany	45
Great Britain	28
Iran	38
United States	45
Hungary	45
Ukraine	43
Spain	36
Russia	45

Quarterfinals
Germany	45
United States	40
Hungary	36
Russia	45

Semifinals
Germany	32
Russia	45

=== Bottom half ===
Round of 32
Italy	45
Czech Republic	10
Mexico	45
Egypt	43
Belarus	45
Georgia	31
Singapore	26
Romania	45
France	45
Vietnam	34
Poland	32
China	45
Japan	42
Canada	45

Round of 16
Italy	45
Mexico	32
Belarus	34
Romania	45
France	45
China	37
Canada	20
South Korea	45

Quarterfinals
Italy	45
Romania	32
France	45
South Korea	44

Semifinals
Italy	45
France	39

=== Placement rounds ===
==== 5–8th place ====
5–8th place semifinals
United States	45
Hungary	41
Romania	45
South Korea	39

Fifth place
United States	45
Romania	38
Seventh place
Hungary	45
South Korea	44

==== 9–16th place ====
9–16th place quarterfinals
Great Britain	33
Iran	45
Ukraine	45
Spain	41
Mexico	40
Belarus	45
China	45
Canada	39

9–12th place semifinals
Iran	42
Ukraine	45
Belarus	45
China	43

Ninth place
Ukraine	41
Belarus	45
Eleventh place
Iran	45
China	41

==== 13–16th place ====
13–16th place semifinals
Great Britain	39
Spain	45
Mexico	35
Canada	45

13th place
Spain	41
Canada	45
15th place
Great Britain	45
Mexico	40

== Final classification ==
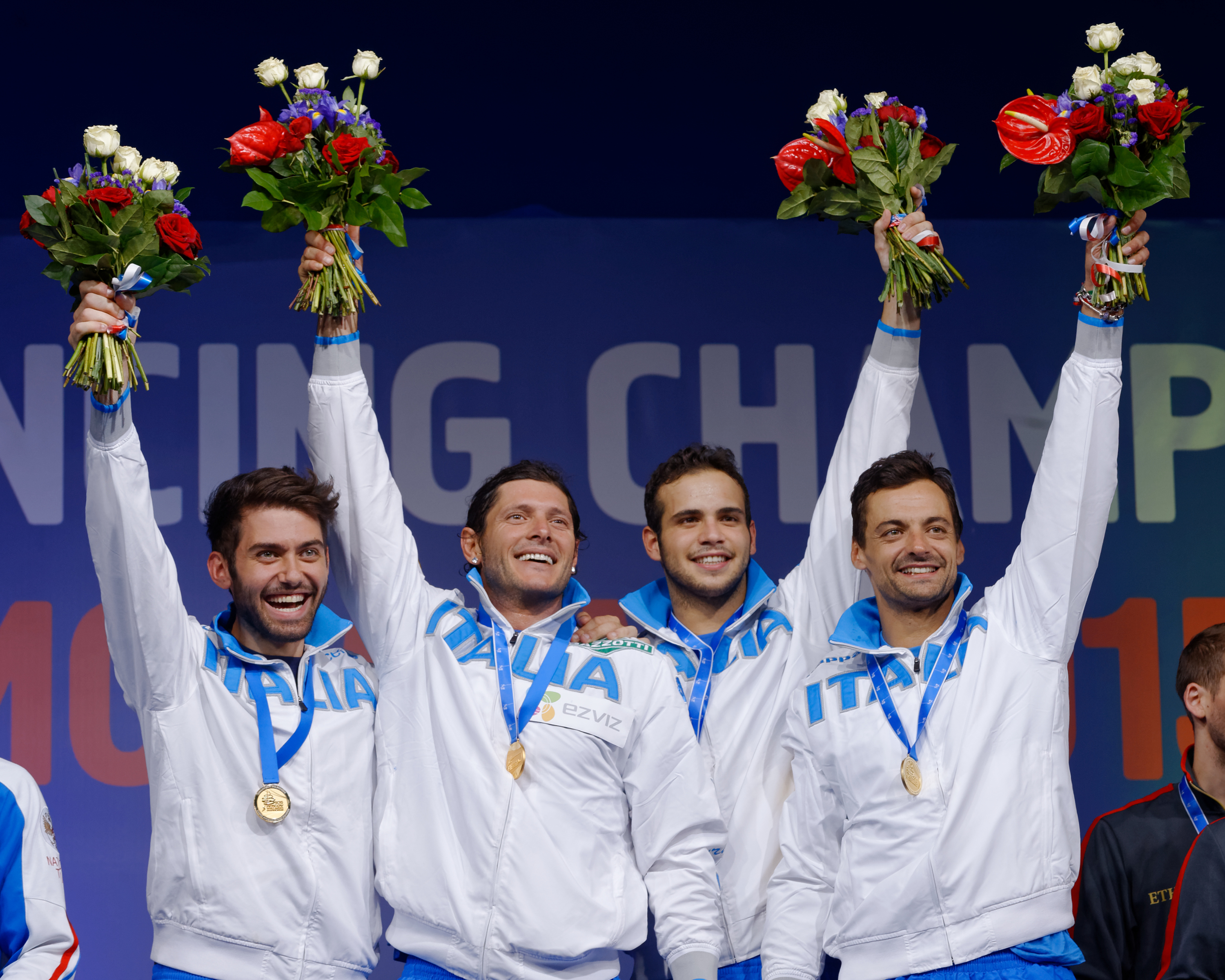
2015 World champions Italy

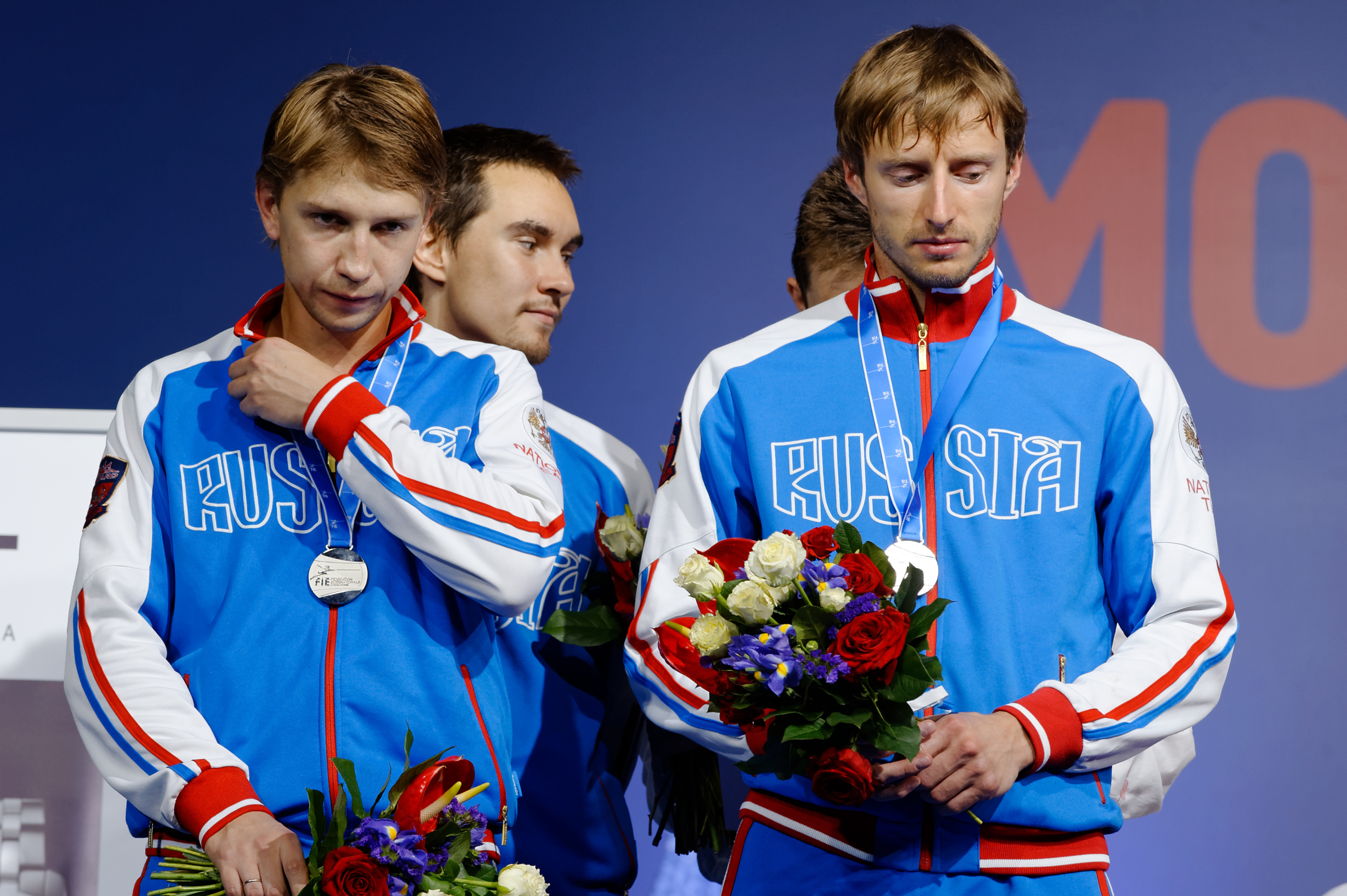
2015 silver medallists Russia

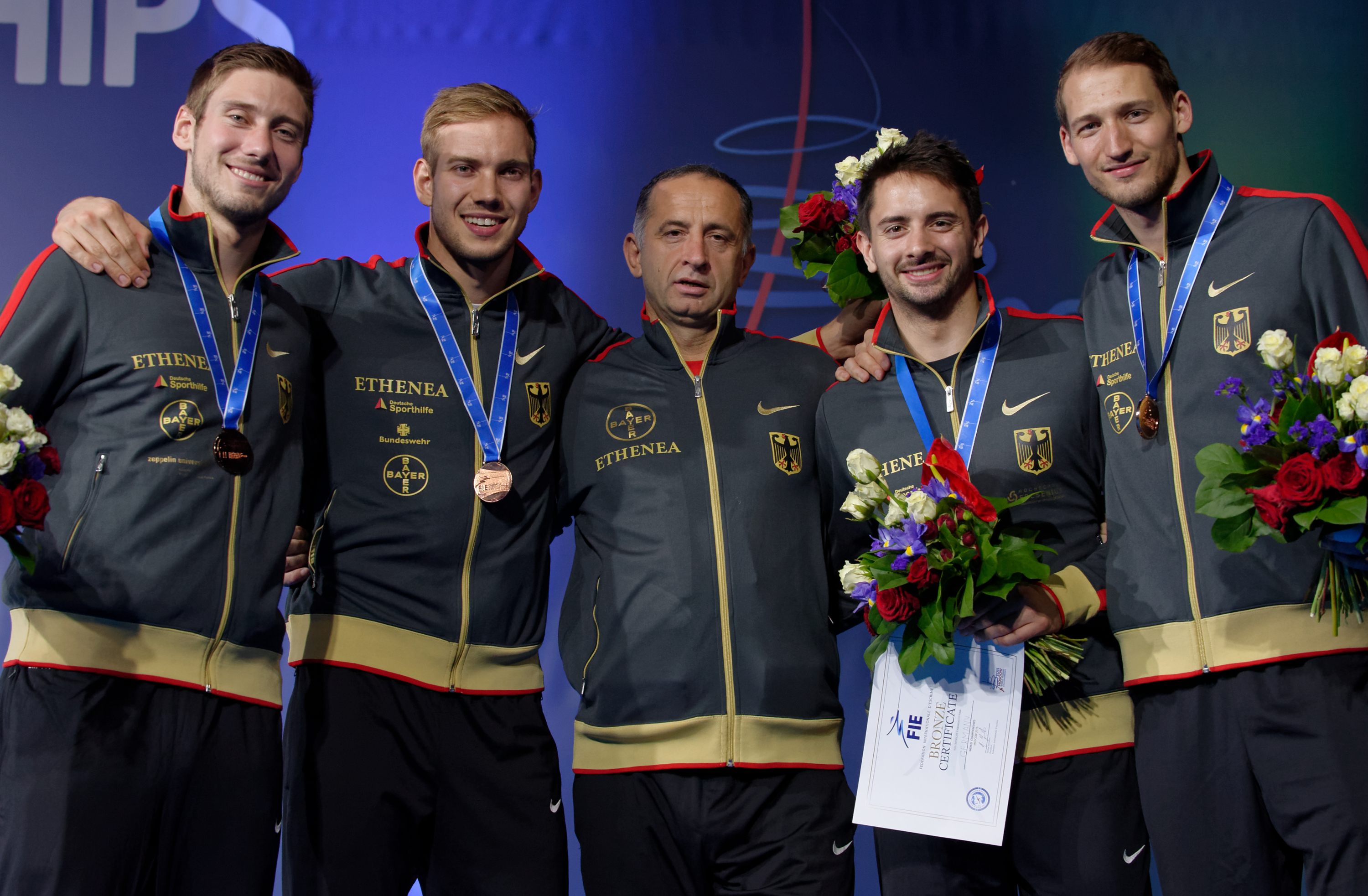
2015 bronze medallists Germany with coach Vilmoș Szabo

Rank	Nation
1st place, gold medalist(s)	Italy
2nd place, silver medalist(s)	Russia
3rd place, bronze medalist(s)	Germany
4	France
5	United States
6	Romania
7	Hungary
8	South Korea
9	Belarus
10	Ukraine
11	Iran
12	China
13	Canada
14	Spain
15	Great Britain
16	Mexico
17	Egypt
18	Japan
19	Hong Kong
20	Kazakhstan
21	Argentina
22	Georgia
23	Poland
24	Venezuela
25	Turkey
26	Vietnam
27	Singapore
28	Australia
29	Kuwait
30	Czech Republic
