= Men's team sabre at the 2023 World Fencing Championships =

- Venue: Milan Convention Center
- Location: Milan, Italy
- Dates: 27–28 July
- Competitors: 98 from 34 nations
- Teams: 34

Medalists
gold medal	Tamás Decsi; Csanád Gémesi; András Szatmári; Áron Szilágyi	Hungary
silver medal	Gu Bon-gil; Ha Han-sol; Kim Jun-ho; Oh Sang-uk	South Korea
bronze medal	Eli Dershwitz; Andrew Doddo; Colin Heathcock; Mitchell Saron	United States

The Men's team sabre competition at the 2023 World Fencing Championships was held on 27 and 28 July 2023.

== Draw ==
=== Finals ===
Semifinals
South Korea	45
United States	27
France	36
Hungary	45

Final
South Korea	42
Hungary	45
Third place
United States	45
France	44

=== Top half ===
==== Section 1 ====
Round of 64
Ireland	26
Uzbekistan	45

Round of 32
South Korea	45
Uzbekistan	28
Hong Kong	42
Georgia	45
China	45
Chile	31
Great Britain	32
Egypt	45

Round of 16
South Korea	45
Georgia	30
China	45
Egypt	39

Quarterfinals
South Korea	45
China	40

==== Section 2 ====
Round of 32
Germany	45
Singapore	23
Poland	43
Spain	45
Romania	45
Kazakhstan	38
India	22
United States	45

Round of 16
Germany	45
Spain	25
Romania	38
United States	45

Quarterfinals
Germany	38
United States	45

=== Bottom half ===
==== Section 3 ====
Round of 32
Italy	45
Bulgaria	26
Tunisia	38
Ukraine	45
Canada	45
Kuwait	31
Venezuela	29
France	45

Round of 16
Italy	45
Ukraine	25
Canada	25
France	45

Quarterfinals
Italy	43
France	45

==== Section 4 ====
Round of 64
Mexico	45
New Zealand	21

Round of 32
Iran	45
Brazil	17
Saudi Arabia	24
Japan	45
Turkey	45
Colombia	33
Hungary	45
Mexico	11

Round of 16
Iran	42
Japan	45
Turkey	41
Hungary	45

Quarterfinals
Japan	25
Hungary	45

=== Placement rounds ===
==== 5–8th place bracket ====
5–8th place semifinals
China	38
Germany	45
Italy	45
Japan	42

Fifth place
Germany	45
Italy	35
Seventh place
China	44
Japan	45

==== 9–16th place bracket ====
9–16th place quarterfinals
Georgia	45
Egypt	41
Spain	31
Romania	45
Ukraine	40
Canada	45
Iran	45
Turkey	41

9–12th place semifinals
Georgia	41
Romania	45
Canada	41
Iran	45

Ninth place
Romania	34
Iran	45
Eleventh place
Georgia	38
Canada	45

==== 13–16th place bracket ====
13–16th place semifinals
Egypt	45
Spain	40
Ukraine	37
Turkey	45

13th place
Egypt	45
Turkey	30
15th place
Spain	41
Ukraine	45

== Final ranking ==
Rank	Team
1st place, gold medalist(s)	Hungary
2nd place, silver medalist(s)	South Korea
3rd place, bronze medalist(s)	United States
4	France
5	Germany
6	Italy
7	Japan
8	China
9	Iran
10	Romania
11	Canada
12	Georgia
13	Egypt
14	Turkey
15	Ukraine
16	Spain
17	Hong Kong
18	Colombia
19	Tunisia
20	Kazakhstan
21	Poland
22	Kuwait
23	Saudi Arabia
24	Chile
25	Great Britain
26	Brazil
27	Venezuela
28	Singapore
29	India
30	Bulgaria
31	Mexico
32	Uzbekistan
33	Ireland
34	New Zealand
