= Men's team sabre at the 2018 World Fencing Championships =

- Venue: Wuxi Sports Center Indoor Stadium
- Location: Wuxi, China
- Dates: 24 July; 25 July
- Competitors: 104 from 26 nations

Medalists
gold medal	Gu Bon-gil; Kim Jung-hwan; Kim Jun-ho; Oh Sang-uk	South Korea
silver medal	Enrico Berrè; Luca Curatoli; Aldo Montano; Luigi Samele	Italy
bronze medal	Tamás Decsi; Csanád Gémesi; András Szatmári; Áron Szilágyi	Hungary

The Men's team sabre event of the 2018 World Fencing Championships was held on 24 and 25 July 2018.

== Draw ==
=== Finals ===
Semifinals
South Korea	45
Georgia	34
Hungary	42
Italy	45

Final
South Korea	45
Italy	39
Third place
Georgia	36
Hungary	45

=== Top half ===
==== Section 1 ====
Round of 32
Colombia	11
Hong Kong	45
Romania	45
Chinese Taipei	21
Iraq	18
France	45

Round of 16
South Korea	45
Hong Kong	24
Romania	43
France	45

Quarterfinals
South Korea	45
France	38

==== Section 2 ====
Round of 32
Thailand	20
Georgia	45
Ukraine	45
Argentina	37

Round of 16
United States	38
Georgia	45
Ukraine	34
Iran	45

Quarterfinals
Georgia	45
Iran	37

=== Bottom half ===
==== Section 3 ====
Round of 32
Chile	29
Japan	45
Canada	45
Singapore	22

Round of 16
Hungary	45
Japan	34
Canada	37
Germany	45

Quarterfinals
Hungary	45
Germany	43

==== Section 4 ====
Round of 32
Russia	w/o
DR Congo
Australia	28
China	45
Great Britain	45
Egypt	38

Round of 16
Russia	45
China	37
Great Britain	22
Italy	45

Quarterfinals
Russia	31
Italy	45

=== Placement rounds ===
==== 5–8th place bracket ====
5–8th place semifinals
France	44
Iran	45
Germany	45
Russia	33

Fifth place
Iran	44
Germany	45
Seventh place
France	43
Russia	45

==== 9–16th place bracket ====
9–16th place quarterfinals
Hong Kong	32
Romania	45
United States	45
Ukraine	43
Japan	38
Canada	45
China	45
Great Britain	44

9–12th place semifinals
Romania	45
United States	35
Canada	45
China	38

Ninth place
Romania	45
Canada	22
Eleventh place
United States	45
China	27

==== 13–16th place bracket ====
13–16th place semifinals
Hong Kong	31
Ukraine	45
Japan	43
Great Britain	45

13th place
Ukraine	45
Great Britain	43
15th place
Hong Kong	45
Japan	44
