= Enrico Berrè =

Italian fencer (born 1992)

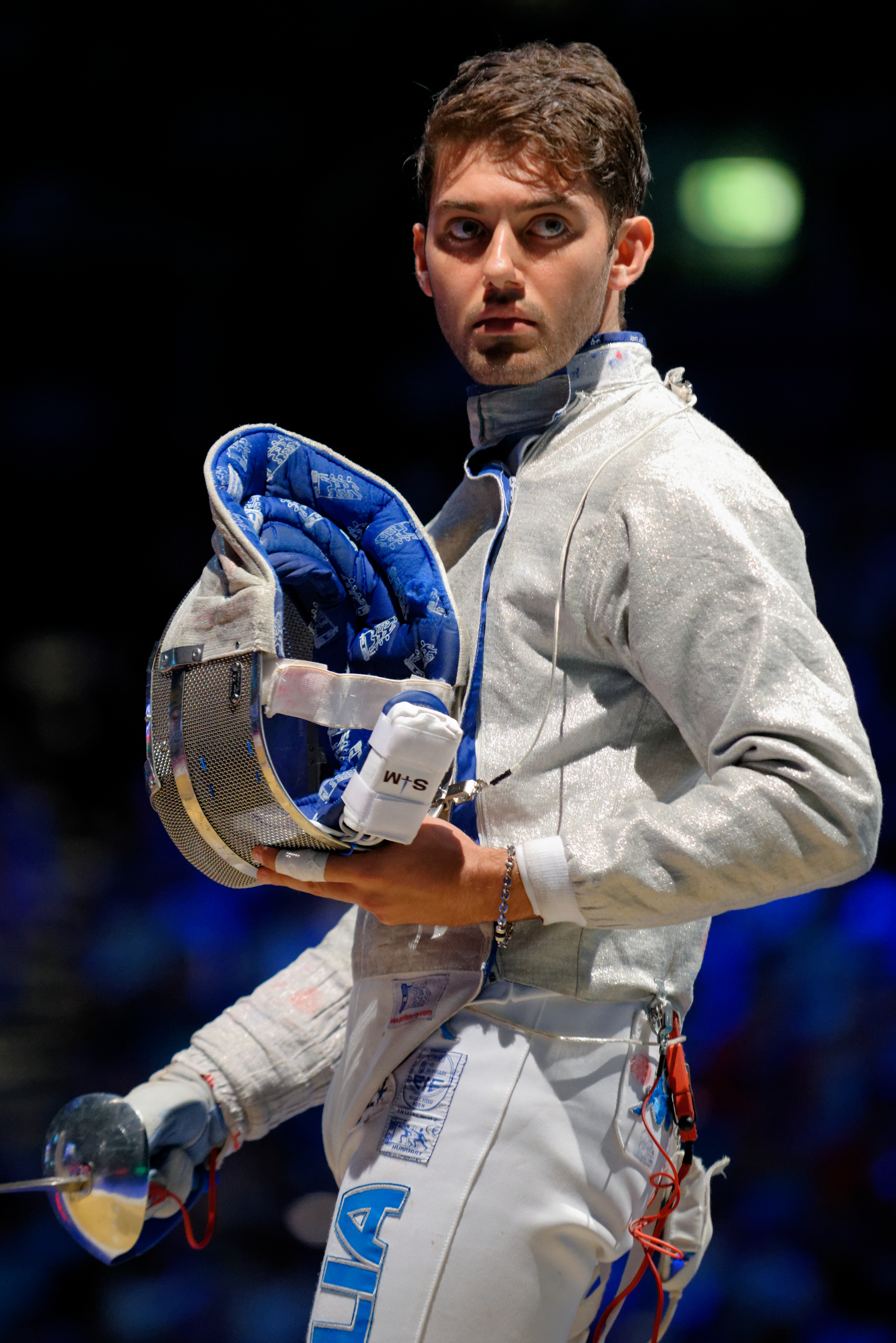
- Berrè at the 2013 World Fencing Championships

Personal information
- Born: 10 November 1992 (age 33) Rome, Italy

Fencing career
- Sport: Fencing
- Country: Italy
- Weapon: Sabre
- Hand: right-handed
- Club: GS Fiamme Gialle
- Head coach: Alessandro Di Agostino
- FIE ranking: current ranking
Medal record
Olympic Games
Silver medal – second place	2020 Tokyo	Team
World Championships
Gold medal – first place	2015 Moscow	Team
Silver medal – second place	2018 Wuxi	Team
Bronze medal – third place	2017 Leipzig	Team
Bronze medal – third place	2019 Budapest	Team
European Championships
Gold medal – first place	2013 Zagreb	Team
Gold medal – first place	2014 Strasbourg	Team
Silver medal – second place	2015 Montreux	Team
Silver medal – second place	2016 Toruń	Team
Silver medal – second place	2017 Tbilisi	Team
Silver medal – second place	2018 Novi Sad	Team
Bronze medal – third place	2013 Zagreb	Individual
Bronze medal – third place	2019 Düsseldorf	Team

Enrico Berrè (born 10 November 1992) is an Italian right-handed sabre fencer, two-time team European champion, 2015 team world champion, and 2021 team Olympic silver medalist.

== Medal record ==
=== Olympic Games ===
Year	Location	Event	Position
2021	Tokyo, Japan	Team Men's Sabre	2nd

=== World Championship ===
Year	Location	Event	Position
2015	Moscow, Russia	Team Men's Sabre	1st
2017	Leipzig, Germany	Team Men's Sabre	3rd
2018	Wuxi, China	Team Men's Sabre	2nd
2019	Budapest, Hungary	Team Men's Sabre	3rd

=== European Championship ===
Year	Location	Event	Position
2013	Zagreb, Croatia	Individual Men's Sabre	3rd
2013	Zagreb, Croatia	Team Men's Sabre	1st
2014	Strasbourg, France	Team Men's Sabre	1st
2015	Montreux, Switzerland	Team Men's Sabre	2nd
2016	Toruń, Poland	Team Men's Sabre	2nd
2017	(Georgia (country)) Tbilisi, Georgia	Team Men's Sabre	2nd
2018	Novi Sad, Serbia	Team Men's Sabre	2nd
2019	Düsseldorf, Germany	Team Men's Sabre	3rd

=== Grand Prix ===
Date	Location	Event	Position
05/24/2014	Plovdiv, Bulgaria	Individual Men's Sabre	1st

=== World Cup ===
Date	Location	Event	Position
02/14/2014	Padua, Italy	Individual Men's Sabre	3rd
05/02/2014	(United States) Chicago, Illinois	Individual Men's Sabre	3rd
11/04/2016	Dakar, Senegal	Individual Men's Sabre	2nd
11/03/2017	Algier, Algeria	Individual Men's Sabre	2nd
05/18/2018	Madrid, Spain	Individual Men's Sabre	1st
11/16/2018	Algier, Algeria	Individual Men's Sabre	3rd

== Biography ==
Berrè began fencing at SS Lazio Scherma Ariccia, first learning foil with maestra Matilde Lerro, then switching to sabre with maestro Vincenzo Castrucci. He later transferred to Club Scherma Roma ASD. He took on international competition in 2008. He won the 2010 Junior European Championships in Lobnya.

Amongst seniors, his first significant result was a bronze medal in the 2013 European Championships. He earned a team gold medal in the same competition. In the World Championships that same year, he made his way to the quarter-finals before being defeated 4–15 by Romania's Tiberiu Dolniceanu.

In the 2013–14 season, Berrè won his first World Cup podium with a bronze in Padua, followed by another bronze in the Budapest Grand Prix, and a gold medal in the Glaive d'Asparoukh at Plovdiv. He took the gold both in the individual and team event at the Italian national championships. In the European Championships he was stopped 13–15 in the quarter-finals by Russia's Aleksey Yakimenko, who eventually won the competition. He took his revenge in the team event by beating Russia 45–44 and came away with a second consecutive team gold.

Berrè studied political science at the Università degli Studi Niccolò Cusano. Since 2011 he is a member of GS Fiamme Gialle, the sports section of the Guardia di Finanza.
