= Sandro Bazadze =

Georgian fencer (born 1993)

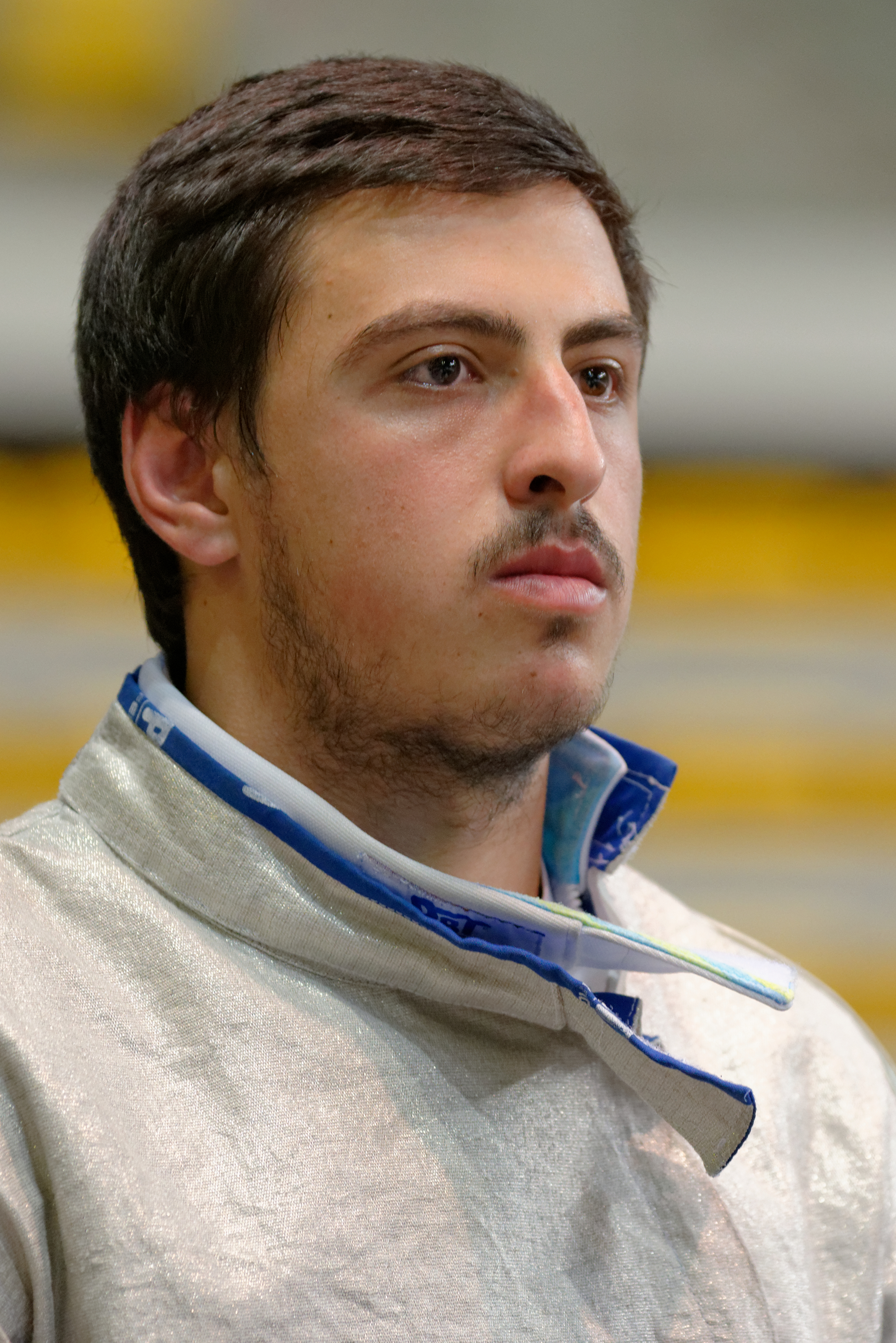

Personal information
- Nationality: Georgian
- Born: 29 July 1993 (age 33) Tbilisi, Georgia
- Height: 1.93 m (6 ft 4 in)
- Weight: 88 kg (194 lb)

Fencing career
- Sport: Fencing
- Weapon: Sabre
- Hand: right-handed
- Club: Fencing Club Kutaisi
- FIE ranking: current ranking
Medal record
Men's sabre
Representing Georgia
World Championships
| Gold medal – first place | 2025 Tbilisi | Individual |
| Silver medal – second place | 2023 Milan | Individual |
| Bronze medal – third place | 2022 Cairo | Individual |
European Games
| Gold medal – first place | 2023 Kraków–Małopolska | Individual |
European Championships
| Gold medal – first place | 2022 Antalya | Individual |
| Gold medal – first place | 2023 Plovdiv | Individual |
| Bronze medal – third place | 2017 Tbilisi | Individual |
| Bronze medal – third place | 2018 Novi Sad | Individual |
| Bronze medal – third place | 2019 Düsseldorf | Individual |

Sandro Bazadze (Georgian: სანდრო ბაზაძე; born 29 July 1993) is a Georgian right-handed sabre fencer. He is the 2023 and 2022 individual European champion, and a three-time Olympian.

Bazadze competed in the 2016 Rio de Janeiro Olympic Games, 2020 Tokyo Olympic Games and 2024 Paris Olympic Games.

== Medal record ==
=== World Championship ===
| Year | Location | Event | Position |
|---|---|---|---|
| 2022 | Cairo, Egypt | Individual Men's Sabre | 3rd |
| 2023 | Milan, Italy | Individual Men's Sabre | 2nd |
| 2025 | (Georgia (country)) Tbilisi, Georgia | Individual Men's Sabre | 1st |

=== European Championship ===
| Year | Location | Event | Position |
|---|---|---|---|
| 2017 | (Georgia (country)) Tbilisi, Georgia | Individual Men's Sabre | 3rd |
| 2018 | Novi Sad, Serbia | Individual Men's Sabre | 3rd |
| 2019 | Düsseldorf, Germany | Individual Men's Sabre | 3rd |
| 2022 | Antalya, Turkey | Individual Men's Sabre | 1st |
| 2023 | Plovdiv, Bulgaria | Individual Men's Sabre | 1st |

=== Grand Prix ===
| Date | Location | Event | Position |
|---|---|---|---|
| 2019-02-22 | Cairo, Egypt | Individual Men's Sabre | 3rd |
| 2020-01-10 | Montreal, Canada | Individual Men's Sabre | 3rd |

=== World Cup ===
| Date | Location | Event | Position |
|---|---|---|---|
| 2016-05-13 | Madrid, Spain | Individual Men's Sabre | 2nd |
| 2021-03-11 | Budapest, Hungary | Individual Men's Sabre | 3rd |
| 2022-01-15 | (Georgia (country)) Tbilisi, Georgia | Individual Men's Sabre | 1st |
| 2022-05-06 | Madrid, Spain | Individual Men's Sabre | 3rd |
| 2026-10-15 | Oran, Algeria | Individual Men's Sabre | 1st |
