= Kim Jun-ho (fencer) =

South Korean fencer (born 1994)

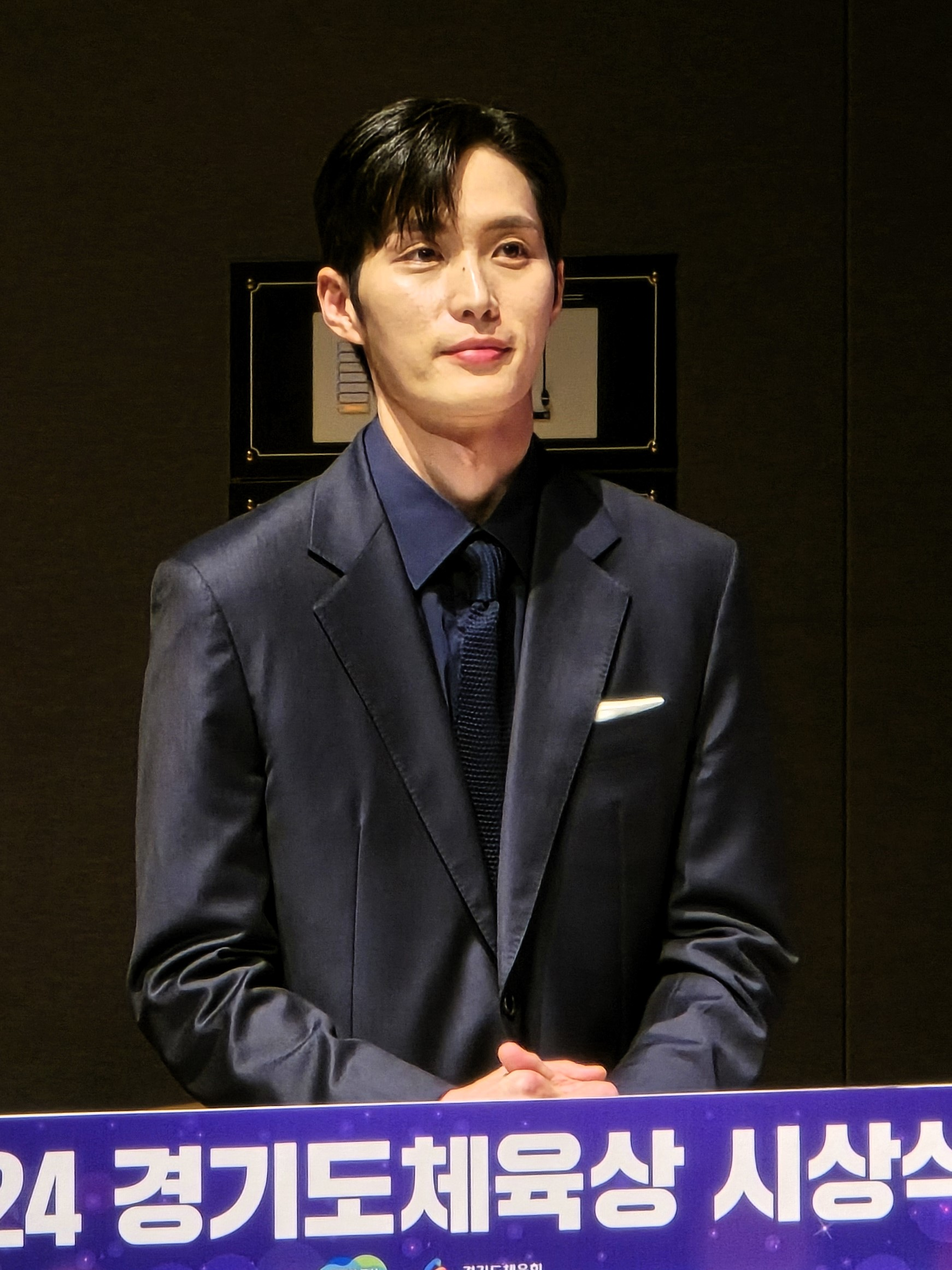
- Kim in 2024

Personal information
- Born: 26 May 1994 (age 32) Hwaseong, South Korea
- Height: 182 cm (6 ft 0 in)

Fencing career
- Sport: Fencing
- Country: South Korea
- Weapon: Sabre
- Hand: right-handed
- Club: Hwaseong City Hall
- Head coach: Yang Dal-sik
- FIE ranking: current ranking
Medal record
Men's sabre
Representing South Korea
Olympic Games
Gold medal – first place	2020 Tokyo	Team
World Championships
Gold medal – first place	2017 Leipzig	Team
Gold medal – first place	2018 Wuxi	Team
Gold medal – first place	2019 Budapest	Team
Gold medal – first place	2022 Cairo	Team
Silver medal – second place	2023 Milan	Team
Bronze medal – third place	2018 Wuxi	Individual
Asian Games
Gold medal – first place	2018 Jakarta	Team
Gold medal – first place	2022 Hangzhou	Team
Asian Championships
Gold medal – first place	2016 Wuxi	Team
Gold medal – first place	2017 Hong Kong	Team
Gold medal – first place	2019 Chiba	Team
Gold medal – first place	2022 Seoul	Team
Bronze medal – third place	2017 Hong Kong	Individual
Bronze medal – third place	2018 Bangkok	Individual
Bronze medal – third place	2018 Bangkok	Team
Universiade
Gold medal – first place	2017 Taipei	Team

- Kim Jun-ho
- Hangul: 김준호
- Hanja: 金準鎬
- RR: Gim Junho
- MR: Kim Chunho

Kim Jun-ho (born 26 May 1994) is a South Korean right-handed sabre fencer, three-time team Asian champion, three-time team world champion, and 2021 team Olympic champion.

== Early life ==
Kim had been a football player throughout elementary school and was introduced to fencing in middle school. He enrolled at Dong-Eui University as it was one of the few universities which had a fencing team.

== Career ==
Kim made the senior national team for the 2014–15 season. He took silver in the 2016 Warsaw competition of the 2015–16 Fencing World Cup, narrowly losing to compatriot Gu Bon-gil, and was also part of the team — along with Gu, Kim Jung-hwan and Oh Sang-uk — which won gold in the men's team sabre at the 2016 Asian Fencing Championships. However, there was no men's team sabre at the 2016 Summer Olympics due to the now-abolished rotation policy and he and Oh were not ranked high enough to qualify for the individual event. Unusual for professional athletes, Kim decided to enlist early rather than apply for a postponement and was assigned to the Korea Armed Forces Athletic Corps. While a member of the Corps, he led the men's sabre team to win the President's National Fencing Championships, the main domestic fencing competition, beating Korea National Sport University.

In 2018 Kim was part of the team which swept gold in the team sabre event at both the World Championships and the Asian Games. He was scheduled to be discharged in October but was granted an early discharge; participating athletes who won gold and had yet to complete their military service were granted exemptions but since Kim had already enlisted, he was discharged earlier than scheduled.

With the retirement of Kim Jung-hwan, Ha Han-sol joined the team and they won gold in the men's team sabre event at the 2019 World Fencing Championships. In the individual event, he made it to the Round of 32 where he was defeated by András Szatmári. He also won bronze at the Cairo Grand Prix, having been defeated by Oh in the quarter-final.

Kim was reunited with his teammates from the 2018 Asian Games and World Championships after Kim Jung-hwan came out of retirement and they qualified for the 2020 Summer Olympics. He was the designated substitute for the team and did not compete in the individual event as Kim Jung-hwan's higher individual FIE ranking meant that the latter entered the individual event instead. Despite the postponement of the Olympics, the quartet successfully defended the men's team sabre gold medal.

Kim was part of the team which won gold at both the 2022 Asian Championships and World Championships. He had a disappointing run in the individual events, having been knocked before the quarterfinal stages in both competitions as well as the Grand Prix competitions.

== Medal record ==
=== Olympic Games ===
Year	Location	Event	Position
2021	Tokyo, Japan	Team Men's Sabre	1st

=== World Championship ===
Year	Location	Event	Position
2017	Leipzig, Germany	Team Men's Sabre	1st
2018	Wuxi, China	Individual Men's Sabre	3rd
2018	Wuxi, China	Team Men's Sabre	1st
2019	Budapest, Hungary	Team Men's Sabre	1st
2022	Cairo, Egypt	Team Men's Sabre	1st

=== Asian Games ===
Year	Location	Event	Position
2018	Jakarta, Indonesia	Team Men's Sabre	1st

=== Asian Championship ===
Year	Location	Event	Position
2016	Wuxi, China	Team Men's Sabre	1st
2017	Hong Kong, China	Individual Men's Sabre	3rd
2017	Hong Kong, China	Team Men's Sabre	1st
2018	Bangkok, Thailand	Individual Men's Sabre	3rd
2018	Bangkok, Thailand	Team Men's Sabre	3rd
2019	Tokyo, Japan	Team Men's Sabre	1st
2022	Seoul, South Korea	Team Men's Sabre	1st

=== Grand Prix ===
Date	Location	Event	Position
22 February 2019	Cairo, Egypt	Individual Men's Sabre	3rd

=== World Cup ===
Date	Location	Event	Position
2016-02-19	Warsaw, Poland	Individual Men's Sabre	2nd
2019-10-05	Madrid, Spain	Individual Men's Sabre	3rd
2020-03-08	Luxembourg	Team Men's Sabre	1st
2022-01-17	(Georgia (country)) Tbilisi, Georgia	Team Men's Sabre	1st
2022-05-08	Madrid, Spain	Team Men's Sabre	1st
2023-03-04	Padua, Italy	Team Men's Sabre	3rd

== Personal life ==
In 2018, Kim married his girlfriend Yoo Jung-hyeon. He appeared on The Return of Superman with their son Eun-woo (born October 22, 2021). In a November 2022 episode of The Return of Superman, the couple announced that they were expecting their second child. Their younger son Jeong-woo was born on May 2, 2023.

In August 2021, Kim signed with Haewadal Entertainment.

== Filmography ==
=== Television series ===
Year	Title	Role	Notes	Ref.
2022	Twenty-Five Twenty-One	Kim Jun-ho	Cameo (Episode 13)	

=== Television shows ===
Year	Title	Role	Notes	Ref.
2021–2024	The Gentlemen's League	Cast Member	Season 2, Season 3	
2022–present	The Return of Superman	Cast Member	Ep 444–present	

== Honours ==
=== Other ===
- 2022 KBS Entertainment Awards (2022) – Popularity Award (The Return of Superman) b
- 2023 KBS Entertainment Awards - Excellence Award in Reality Shows (The Return of Superman)
