= Áron Szilágyi =

Hungarian fencer (born 1990)

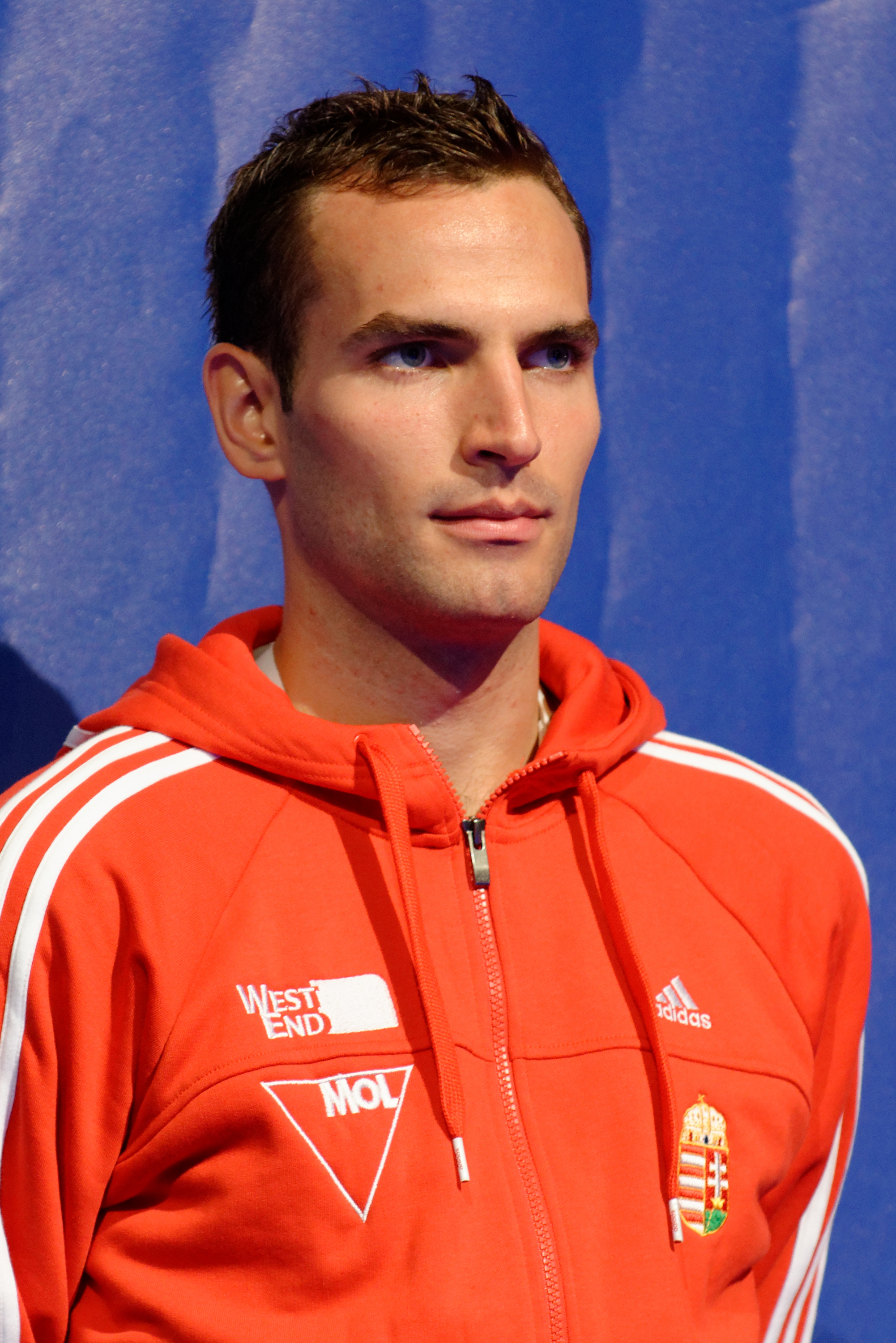
- Szilágyi at the 2013 World Championships in Budapest

Personal information
- Born: 14 January 1990 (age 36) Budapest, Hungary
- Height: 1.80 m (5 ft 11 in)
- Weight: 78 kg (172 lb)

Fencing career
- Sport: Fencing
- Country: Hungary
- Weapon: Sabre
- Hand: right-handed
- National coach: András Decsi
- Club: Vasas
- Former coach: Béla Somlai, György Gerevich
- FIE ranking: current ranking
Medal record
Men's sabre
Representing Hungary
| Event | 1st | 2nd | 3rd |
|---|---|---|---|
| Olympic Games | 3 | 1 | 1 |
| World Championships | 3 | 5 | 5 |
| European Championships | 5 | 4 | 3 |
| Total | 11 | 10 | 9 |
Olympic Games
| Gold medal – first place | 2012 London | Individual |
| Gold medal – first place | 2016 Rio de Janeiro | Individual |
| Gold medal – first place | 2020 Tokyo | Individual |
| Silver medal – second place | 2024 Paris | Team |
| Bronze medal – third place | 2020 Tokyo | Team |
World Championships
| Gold medal – first place | 2007 Saint Petersburg | Team |
| Gold medal – first place | 2022 Cairo | Individual |
| Gold medal – first place | 2023 Milan | Team |
| Silver medal – second place | 2016 Rio de Janeiro | Team |
| Silver medal – second place | 2017 Leipzig | Team |
| Silver medal – second place | 2019 Budapest | Team |
| Silver medal – second place | 2022 Cairo | Team |
| Silver medal – second place | 2025 Tbilisi | Team |
| Bronze medal – third place | 2009 Antalya | Team |
| Bronze medal – third place | 2013 Budapest | Individual |
| Bronze medal – third place | 2014 Kazan | Team |
| Bronze medal – third place | 2018 Wuxi | Team |
| Bronze medal – third place | 2023 Milan | Individual |
European Games
| Bronze medal – third place | 2023 Kraków–Małopolska | Individual |
European Championships
| Gold medal – first place | 2015 Montreux | Individual |
| Gold medal – first place | 2018 Novi Sad | Team |
| Gold medal – first place | 2022 Antalya | Team |
| Gold medal – first place | 2024 Basel | Team |
| Gold medal – first place | 2025 Genoa | Team |
| Gold medal – first place | 2026 Antony | Team |
| Silver medal – second place | 2013 Zagreb | Team |
| Silver medal – second place | 2017 Tbilisi | Individual |
| Silver medal – second place | 2019 Düsseldorf | Team |
| Silver medal – second place | 2025 Genoa | Individual |
| Bronze medal – third place | 2011 Sheffield | Individual |
| Bronze medal – third place | 2015 Montreux | Team |
| Bronze medal – third place | 2017 Tbilisi | Team |

Áron Szilágyi (Hungarian: [ˈaːron ˈsilaːɟi]; born 14 January 1990) is a Hungarian right-handed sabre fencer. A five-time Olympian, Szilágyi is a three-time individual Olympic champion, 2021 team Olympic bronze medalist, and 2024 team Olympic silver medalist.

Szilágyi competed in the 2008 Beijing Olympic Games, the 2012 London Olympic Games, the 2016 Rio de Janeiro Olympic Games, and the 2020 Tokyo Olympic Games. In Tokyo, Szilágyi became the only male fencer in history to win three individual Olympic gold medals.

Szilágyi is also a 2018 team European champion, 2015 individual European champion, 2007 team world champion, and 2022 individual world champion.

Szilágyi has served as the president of the Vasas Sport Club Fencing Division since 2020.

== Career ==
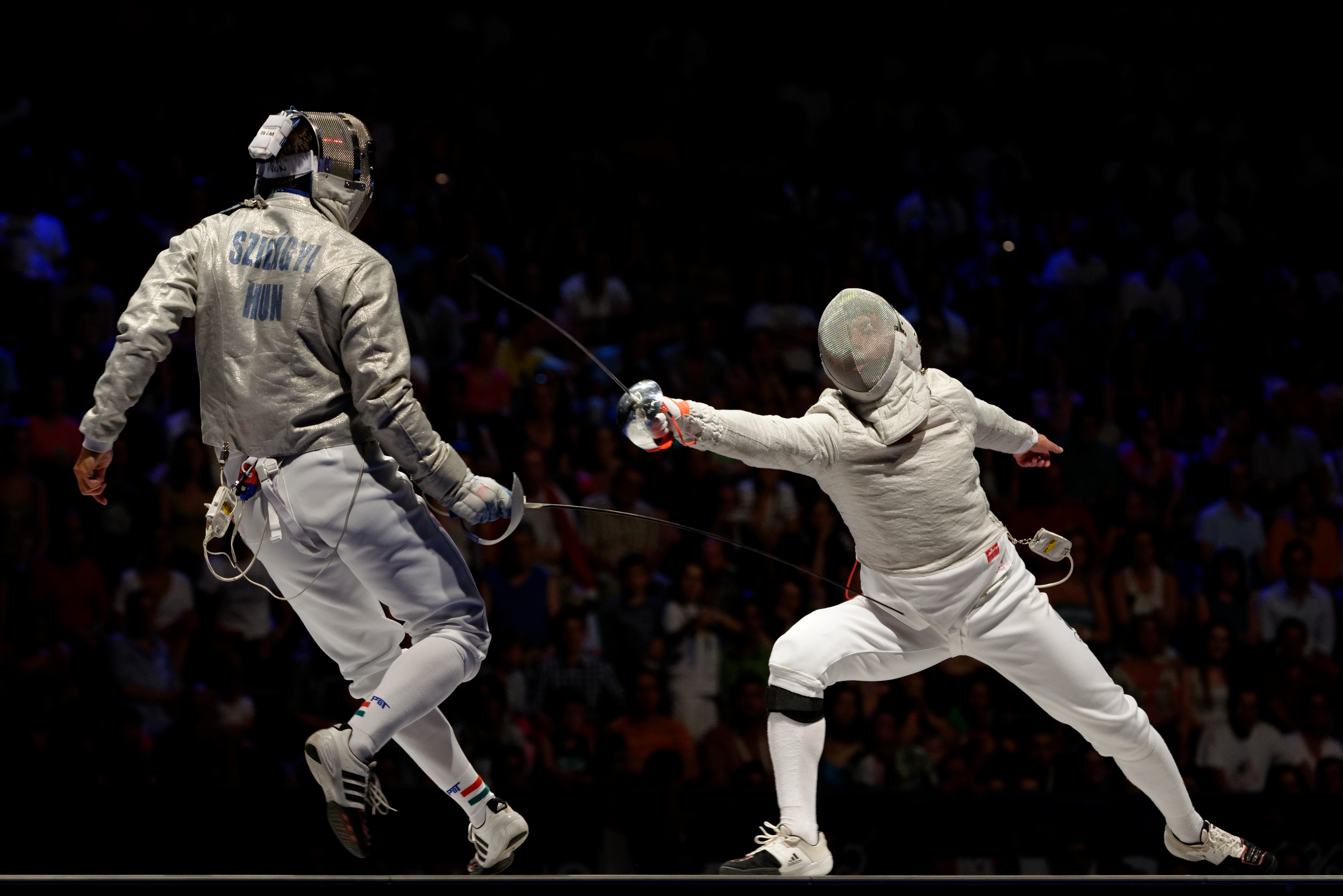
Szilágyi (L) evades Kovalev's attack in the semi-finals of the 2013 World Fencing Championships

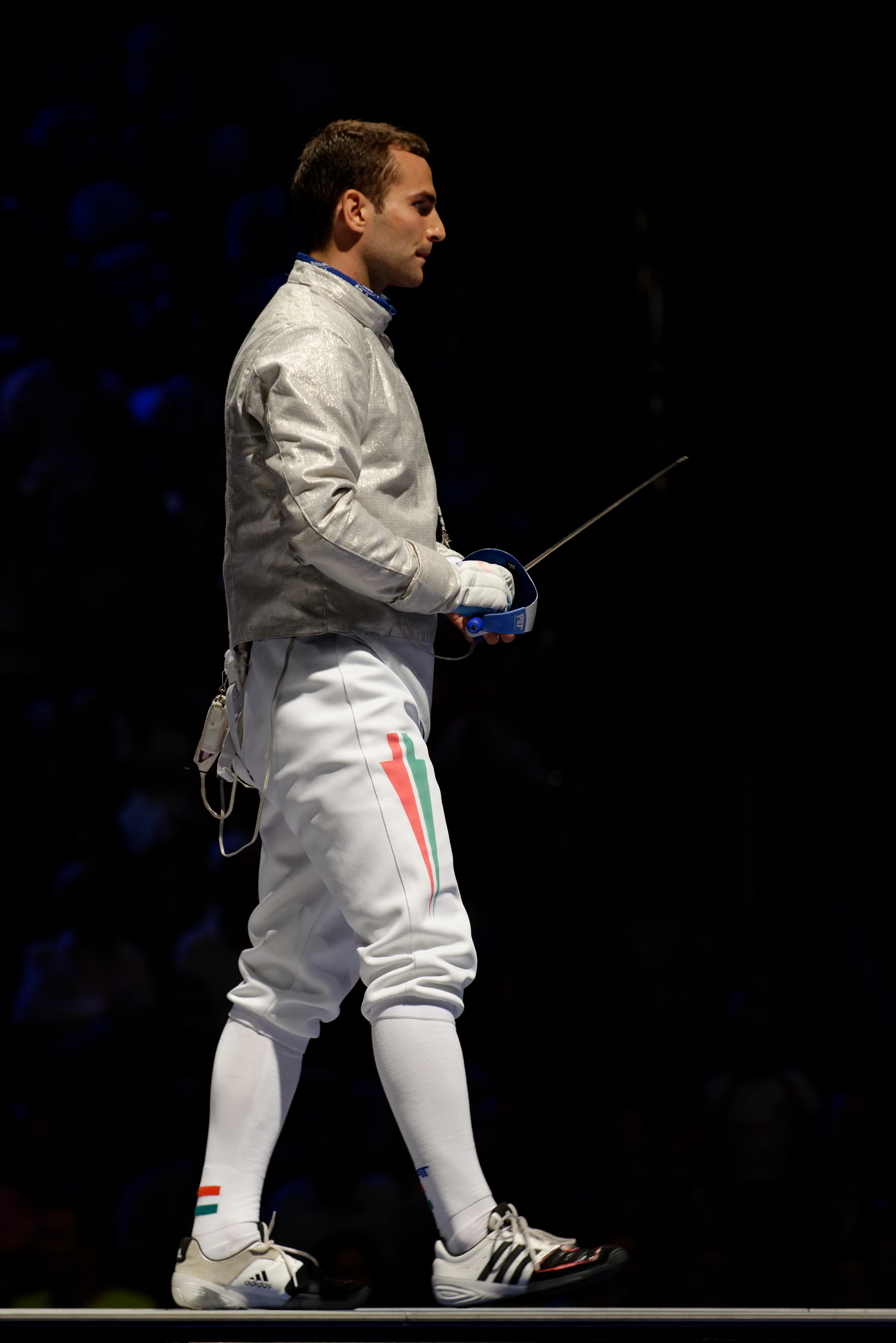
Szilágyi at the 2013 World Fencing Championships

Szilágyi began fencing at age nine at Vasas SC in Budapest, which remains his club as of 2015. His first coach was György Gerevich, whom he considers as his personal hero alongside György's father, seven-time Olympic champion Aladár Gerevich.

While he was still a cadet, Szilágyi joined the senior Hungarian team for the 2007 World Fencing Championships in Saint-Petersburg. Hungary won their first gold medal in men's sabre since 1998 after defeating France 45–43. For this performance, Tamás Decsi, Balázs Lontay, Zsolt Nemcsik and Áron Szilágyi were named Hungarian team of the year.

He competed in the 2008 Beijing Olympics, finishing 15th in the individual event and 7th in the team event. He earned team bronze in the 2009 World Fencing Championships in Antalya, and placed third in the individual event of the 2011 European Fencing Championships in Sheffield.

The only Hungarian to qualify to the men's sabre event of the 2012 Summer Olympics, he was seeded no.5. In the table of 16 he defeated 2008 Olympic champion Zhong Man of China, then overcame Germany's Max Hartung and Russia's Nikolay Kovalev to reach the final. After taking an early 7–0 lead over Italy's Diego Occhiuzzi, Szilágyi closed the match on 15–8 to win Hungary's first gold medal in the London games.

Szilágyi featured on the official poster and video campaign of the 2013 World Fencing Championships held in his home city, Budapest. He was defeated in the semi-finals by Nikolay Kovalev and took the bronze medal. In the team event, Hungary was eliminated in the table of 8 by Romania and finished 7th after the ranking matches. Szilágyi finished the season world no.2, a career best as of 2015.

In the 2014–15 season Szilágyi claimed his first continental title in Montreux, after prevailing over Max Hartung despite a right-ankle injury. Hartung took his revenge in the 2015 World Fencing Championships by defeating Szilágyi in the quarter-finals of the individual event.

After the competition Szilágyi announced that he would prepare for the 2016 Summer Olympics in Rio de Janeiro with András Decsi, Singapore's national coach and elder brother to Szilágyi's teammate Tamás. He won his second gold medal at the 2016 Olympics, defeating Daryl Homer 15–8 in the final.

At the 2020 Summer Olympics, Szilágyi won his third gold medal, defeating Luigi Samele 15–7 in the final.

He won the gold medal in the men's sabre event at the 2022 World Fencing Championships held in Cairo, Egypt.

In January 2024, he received the World Fair Play Award due to his exemplary action in the final of the Gerevich-Kovács-Kárpáti Men's Sabre World Cup in Budapest in March, 2023.

At the 2024 Summer Olympics in Paris, Szilágyi was defeated in the first round by Fares Arfa of Canada, his first Olympic defeat since 2008.

== Medal record ==
=== Olympic Games ===
| Year | Location | Event | Position |
|---|---|---|---|
| 2012 | London, United Kingdom | Individual Men's Sabre | 1st |
| 2016 | Rio de Janeiro, Brazil | Individual Men's Sabre | 1st |
| 2021 | Tokyo, Japan | Individual Men's Sabre | 1st |
| 2021 | Tokyo, Japan | Team Men's Sabre | 3rd |
| 2024 | Paris, France | Team Men's Sabre | 2nd |

=== World Championships ===
| Year | Location | Event | Position |
|---|---|---|---|
| 2007 | St. Petersburg, Russia | Team Men's Sabre | 1st |
| 2009 | Antalya, Turkey | Team Men's Sabre | 3rd |
| 2013 | Budapest, Hungary | Individual Men's Sabre | 3rd |
| 2014 | Kazan, Russia | Team Men's Sabre | 3rd |
| 2016 | Rio de Janeiro, Brazil | Team Men's Sabre | 2nd |
| 2017 | Leipzig, Germany | Team Men's Sabre | 2nd |
| 2018 | Wuxi, China | Team Men's Sabre | 3rd |
| 2019 | Budapest, Hungary | Team Men's Sabre | 2nd |
| 2022 | Cairo, Egypt | Individual Men's Sabre | 1st |
| 2022 | Cairo, Egypt | Team Men's Sabre | 2nd |
| 2023 | Milan, Italy | Individual Men's Sabre | 3rd |
| 2023 | Milan, Italy | Team Men's Sabre | 1st |
| 2025 | (Georgia (country)) Tbilisi, Georgia | Team Men's Sabre | 2nd |

=== European Championship ===
| Year | Location | Event | Position |
|---|---|---|---|
| 2011 | Sheffield, United Kingdom | Individual Men's Sabre | 3rd |
| 2013 | Zagreb, Croatia | Team Men's Sabre | 2nd |
| 2015 | Montreux, Switzerland | Individual Men's Sabre | 1st |
| 2015 | Montreux, Switzerland | Team Men's Sabre | 3rd |
| 2017 | (Georgia (country)) Tbilisi, Georgia | Individual Men's Sabre | 2nd |
| 2017 | (Georgia (country)) Tbilisi, Georgia | Team Men's Sabre | 3rd |
| 2018 | Novi Sad, Serbia | Team Men's Sabre | 1st |
| 2019 | Düsseldorf, Germany | Team Men's Sabre | 2nd |
| 2022 | Antalya, Turkey | Team Men's Sabre | 1st |
| 2024 | Basel, Switzerland | Team Men's Sabre | 1st |

=== Grand Prix ===
| Date | Location | Event | Position |
|---|---|---|---|
| 2008-06-21 | (United States) Las Vegas, Nevada | Individual Men's Sabre | 3rd |
| 2009-05-29 | Padua, Italy | Individual Men's Sabre | 3rd |
| 2010-03-21 | Tunis, Tunisia | Individual Men's Sabre | 3rd |
| 2010-05-28 | Padua, Italy | Individual Men's Sabre | 1st |
| 2012-03-03 | Budapest, Hungary | Individual Men's Sabre | 2nd |
| 2013-03-09 | Budapest, Hungary | Individual Men's Sabre | 3rd |
| 2014-03-08 | Budapest, Hungary | Individual Men's Sabre | 2nd |
| 2014-12-13 | (United States) New York, New York | Individual Men's Sabre | 3rd |
| 2015-05-29 | Moscow, Russia | Individual Men's Sabre | 3rd |
| 2015-12-12 | (United States) Boston, Massachusetts | Individual Men's Sabre | 2nd |
| 2017-06-02 | Moscow, Russia | Individual Men's Sabre | 3rd |
| 2017-12-15 | Cancún, Mexico | Individual Men's Sabre | 2nd |
| 2018-03-30 | Seoul, South Korea | Individual Men's Sabre | 1st |
| 2019-02-22 | Cairo, Egypt | Individual Men's Sabre | 2nd |
| 2019-04-26 | Seoul, South Korea | Individual Men's Sabre | 2nd |
| 2022-05-20 | Padua, Italy | Individual Men's Sabre | 1st |
| 2022-12-08 | Orléans, France | Individual Men's Sabre | 1st |
| 2023-04-27 | Seoul, South Korea | Individual Men's Sabre | 3rd |
| 2024-01-13 | Tunis, Tunisia | Individual Men's Sabre | 3rd |

=== World Cup ===
| Date | Location | Event | Position |
|---|---|---|---|
| 2008-01-19 | Istanbul, Turkey | Individual Men's Sabre | 3rd |
| 2011-04-28 | Athens, Greece | Individual Men's Sabre | 1st |
| 2012-06-22 | (United States) Chicago, Illinois | Individual Men's Sabre | 1st |
| 2013-02-08 | Madrid, Spain | Individual Men's Sabre | 3rd |
| 2013-02-15 | Padua, Italy | Individual Men's Sabre | 3rd |
| 2013-04-26 | Athens, Greece | Individual Men's Sabre | 1st |
| 2013-05-03 | (United States) Chicago, Illinois | Individual Men's Sabre | 2nd |
| 2014-02-14 | Padua, Italy | Individual Men's Sabre | 1st |
| 2014-04-25 | Athens, Greece | Individual Men's Sabre | 1st |
| 2014-11-21 | Budapest, Hungary | Individual Men's Sabre | 2nd |
| 2015-02-20 | Warsaw, Poland | Individual Men's Sabre | 3rd |
| 2016-01-29 | Padua, Italy | Individual Men's Sabre | 2nd |
| 2017-02-24 | Warsaw, Poland | Individual Men's Sabre | 2nd |
| 2017-05-19 | Madrid, Spain | Individual Men's Sabre | 3rd |
| 2018-02-02 | Padua, Italy | Individual Men's Sabre | 2nd |
| 2019-05-10 | Madrid, Spain | Individual Men's Sabre | 2nd |
| 2020-02-21 | Warsaw, Poland | Individual Men's Sabre | 1st |
| 2020-03-06 | Luxembourg | Individual Men's Sabre | 1st |
| 2021-03-11 | Budapest, Hungary | Individual Men's Sabre | 2nd |
| 2022-03-18 | Budapest, Hungary | Individual Men's Sabre | 1st |
| 2022-05-08 | Madrid, Spain | Team Men's Sabre | 2nd |
| 2023-02-12 | Warsaw, Poland | Team Men's Sabre | 2nd |
| 2023-03-04 | Padua, Italy | Team Men's Sabre | 1st |
| 2023-03-25 | Budapest, Hungary | Individual Men's Sabre | 1st |
| 2023-03-26 | Budapest, Hungary | Team Men's Sabre | 3rd |
| 2023-11-09 | Algiers, Algeria | Individual Men's Sabre | 3rd |
| 2024-02-09 | (Georgia (country)) Tbilisi, Georgia | Individual Men's Sabre | 1st |

== Personal life ==
Szilágyi studied international relations at Eötvös Loránd University in Budapest. Beside his degree in international relations, he also holds a degree in psychology from Károli Gáspár University. He speaks three languages: Hungarian, English and French. His interests include psychology, travel, coffee and fine wines.

In 2017, he married his long-time girlfriend, Betti. Their son, Leó was born in 2023.

== Societal engagement ==
On 13 February 2013, Szilágyi presented the Bálint Balassi Memorial Sword, an international literary prize founded by Hungary, to French literary translator Jean-Luc Moreau at the Gellért Hotel. In spring 2013, he became a financial education ambassador of TakarékPont, a Hungarian financial service provider.

In 2006, when the New Europe Foundation of MOL was launched, he was one of the first to win the support of the MOL Talent Support Programme. From 2013 until 2022, he was a Member of the Athletes' Commission of the International Fencing Federation, while from 2017 to 2019 he served as President of the commission. Since 2017, he has been a goodwill ambassador of the New Europe Foundation, participating in the foundation's charity programmes for young people.

In 2021, he accepted the invitation to become Social Chairman of the Forum for the Protection of Interests of Hungarian Elite Athletes.

Since 2021, he has been a Member of the Athletes' Commission of the Hungarian Olympic Committee.

== Awards ==
- Hungarian Sportsman of the Year: 2016, 2021
- Hungarian Junior fencer of the Year: 2006, 2009
- Junior Príma award (2010)
- Hungarian Fencer of the Year (7): 2011, 2012, 2016, 2018, 2020, 2021, 2022
- Honorary Citizen of Budapest (2012)
- FIE Fair Play Award: 2019

Orders and special awards

- Officer's Cross of the Hungarian Order of Merit (2012)
- Commander's Cross of the Hungarian Order of Merit (2016)
- Grand Cross of the Hungarian Order of Merit (2021)
- Hungarian Order of Saint Stephen (2023)

Awards
| Preceded by László Cseh | Hungarian Sportsman of The Year; 2016 | Succeeded by Balázs Baji |
Olympic Games
| Preceded by Péter Biros | Flagbearer for Hungary; Rio de Janeiro 2016 | Succeeded by Aida Mohamed & László Cseh |
