= Pietro Torre =

Italian fencer (born 2002)

Personal information
- Born: 6 May 2002 (age 24)
- Home town: Livorno, Italy

Fencing career
- Sport: Fencing
- Country: Italy
- Weapon: Sabre
- Hand: Right-handed
- Club: GS Fiamme Oro
- Head coach: Nicola Zanotti
Medal record
Men's sabre
Representing Italy
World Championships
Gold medal – first place	2025 Tbilisi	Team
Bronze medal – third place	2022 Cairo	Team
Junior World Championships
Gold medal – first place	2022 Dubai	Team
Silver medal – second place	2022 Dubai	Individual
European Championships
Silver medal – second place	2025 Genoa	Team

Pietro Torre (born 6 May 2002) is an Italian right-handed sabre fencer. He represented Italy at the 2024 Summer Olympics.

== Career ==
In July 2024, Torre represented Italy at the 2024 Summer Olympics and finished in fifth place in the team sabre event.

In June 2025, Torre competed at the 2025 European Fencing Championships and won a silver medal in the team event. The next month he competed at the 2025 World Fencing Championships and won a gold medal in the team sabre event.

== Medal record ==
=== World Championship ===
Year	Location	Event	Position
2025	(Georgia (country)) Tbilisi, Georgia	Team Men's Sabre	1st
