= Ha Han-sol =

South Korean fencer (born 1993)

Personal information
- Born: 24 November 1993 (age 32)

Fencing career
- Sport: Fencing
- Country: South Korea
- Weapon: Sabre
- Hand: right-handed
- National coach: You Sang-Joo
- Club: Seongnam City Hall
- Head coach: Kim Hyung-Yeol
- FIE ranking: current ranking
Medal record
Men's sabre
Representing South Korea
World Championships
Gold medal – first place	2019 Budapest	Team
Silver medal – second place	2023 Milan	Team
Asian Championships
Gold medal – first place	2019 Chiba	Team
Gold medal – first place	2024 Kuwait City	Team
Bronze medal – third place	2019 Chiba	Individual

Ha Han-sol (Korean: 하한솔, born 24 November 1993) is a South Korean sabre fencer.

He participated at the 2019 World Fencing Championships, winning a medal.
