= Benedikt Wagner =

German fencer

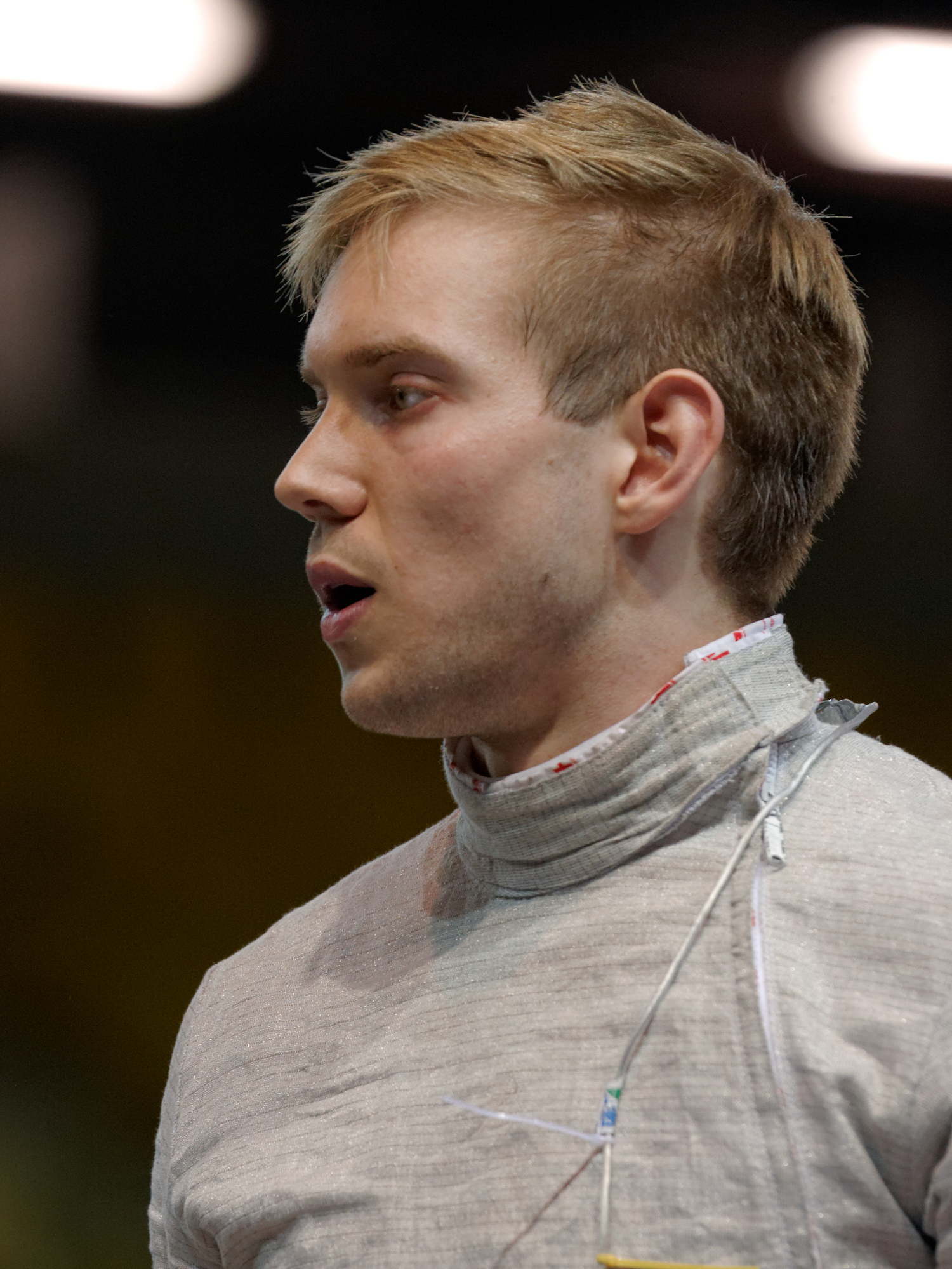

Personal information
- Nationality: German
- Born: 14 June 1990 (age 36) Bonn, West Germany
- Height: 1.90 m (6 ft 3 in)
- Weight: 85 kg (187 lb)

Fencing career
- Sport: Fencing
- Weapon: Sabre
- Hand: right-handed
- National coach: Vilmoș Szabo
- FIE ranking: current ranking
Medal record
World Championships
Gold medal – first place	2014 Kazan	Team
Bronze medal – third place	2015 Moscow	Team
European Championships
Gold medal – first place	2015 Montreux	Team
Gold medal – first place	2016 Toruń	Individual
Gold medal – first place	2019 Düsseldorf	Team
Silver medal – second place	2011 Sheffield	Team
Bronze medal – third place	2012 Legnano	Team
Bronze medal – third place	2014 Strasbourg	Team
Bronze medal – third place	2018 Novi Sad	Team

Benedikt Wagner (born 14 June 1990) is a German fencer, team World champion in 2014. At the 2012 Summer Olympics, he competed in the Men's sabre, but was defeated in the third round by his teammate Nicolas Limbach, the German team which he was a member of were knocked out in the quarterfinals. He also won the European Championship in 2016.
