= 2022 World Fencing Championships =

Fencing tournament in Cairo, Egypt

- Dates: 15–23 July
- Host city: Cairo, Egypt
- Venue: Cairo Stadium Indoor Halls Complex

The 2022 World Fencing Championships were held from 15 to 23 July 2022 in Cairo, Egypt.

== Schedule ==
Twelve events were held.

All times are local (UTC+2).

Date	Time	Round
15 July	09:00	Women's épée qualification
15 July	13:00	Men's sabre qualification
16 July	09:00	Women's foil qualification
16 July	13:00	Men's épée qualification
17 July	09:00	Women's sabre qualification
17 July	12:00	Men's foil qualification
18 July	08:30	Women's épée
18 July	10:00	Men's sabre
19 July	08:30	Women's foil
19 July	10:00	Men's épée
20 July	08:30	Women's épée team qualification
20 July	08:30	Men's sabre team qualification
20 July	10:00	Women's sabre
20 July	11:00	Men's foil
21 July	08:30	Men's épée team qualification
21 July	08:30	Women's foil team qualification
21 July	10:00	Women's épée team
21 July	11:20	Men's sabre team
22 July	08:30	Men's foil team qualification
22 July	08:30	Women's sabre team qualification
22 July	10:00	Women's foil team
22 July	11:20	Men's épée team
23 July	10:30	Women's sabre team
23 July	11:00	Men's foil team

== Medal summary ==
=== Medal table ===
Rank	Nation	Gold	Silver	Bronze	Total
1	France	4	2	2	8
2	South Korea	3	0	0	3
3	Italy	2	4	2	8
4	Hungary	2	1	0	3
5	Japan	1	1	2	4
6	United States	0	2	2	4
7	Azerbaijan	0	1	0	1
7	Germany	0	1	0	1
9	Hong Kong	0	0	2	2
9	Romania	0	0	2	2
11	Belgium	0	0	1	1
11	Georgia	0	0	1	1
11	Greece	0	0	1	1
11	Poland	0	0	1	1
11	Spain	0	0	1	1
11	Ukraine	0	0	1	1
Totals (16 entries)		12	12	18	42

=== Men ===
Event	Gold	Silver	Bronze
Individual épée	Romain Cannone; France	Kazuyasu Minobe; Japan	Neisser Loyola; Belgium
Individual épée	Romain Cannone; France	Kazuyasu Minobe; Japan	Ihor Reizlin; Ukraine
Team épée	France; Alexandre Bardenet; Yannick Borel; Romain Cannone; Alex Fava	Italy; Gabriele Cimini; Davide Di Veroli; Andrea Santarelli; Federico Vismara	Japan; Koki Kano; Ryu Matsumoto; Kazuyasu Minobe; Masaru Yamada
Individual foil	Enzo Lefort; France	Tommaso Marini; Italy	Cheung Ka Long; Hong Kong
Individual foil	Enzo Lefort; France	Tommaso Marini; Italy	Nick Itkin; United States
Team foil	Italy; Guillaume Bianchi; Alessio Foconi; Daniele Garozzo; Tommaso Marini	United States; Chase Emmer; Nick Itkin; Alexander Massialas; Gerek Meinhardt	France; Maximilien Chastanet; Enzo Lefort; Pierre Loisel; Alexandre Sido
Individual sabre	Áron Szilágyi; Hungary	Maxime Pianfetti; France	Iulian Teodosiu; Romania
Individual sabre	Áron Szilágyi; Hungary	Maxime Pianfetti; France	Sandro Bazadze; Georgia
Team sabre	South Korea; Gu Bon-gil; Kim Jun-ho; Kim Jung-hwan; Oh Sang-uk	Hungary; Tamás Decsi; Csanád Gémesi; András Szatmári; Áron Szilágyi	Italy; Luca Curatoli; Michele Gallo; Luigi Samele; Pietro Torre

=== Women ===
Event	Gold	Silver	Bronze
Individual épée	Song Se-ra; South Korea	Alexandra Ndolo; Germany	Rossella Fiamingo; Italy
Individual épée	Song Se-ra; South Korea	Alexandra Ndolo; Germany	Vivian Kong; Hong Kong
Team épée	South Korea; Choi In-jeong; Kang Young-mi; Lee Hye-in; Song Se-ra	Italy; Rossella Fiamingo; Federica Isola; Mara Navarria; Alberta Santuccio	Poland; Renata Knapik-Miazga; Magdalena Pawłowska; Kamila Pytka; Martyna Swatowska-Wenglarczyk
Individual foil	Ysaora Thibus; France	Arianna Errigo; Italy	Lee Kiefer; United States
Individual foil	Ysaora Thibus; France	Arianna Errigo; Italy	Maria Boldor; Romania
Team foil	Italy; Arianna Errigo; Martina Favaretto; Francesca Palumbo; Alice Volpi	United States; Jacqueline Dubrovich; Lee Kiefer; Zander Rhodes; Maia Weintraub	France; Anita Blaze; Solène Butruille; Pauline Ranvier; Ysaora Thibus
Individual sabre	Misaki Emura; Japan	Anna Bashta; Azerbaijan	Araceli Navarro; Spain
Individual sabre	Misaki Emura; Japan	Anna Bashta; Azerbaijan	Despina Georgiadou; Greece
Team sabre	Hungary; Sugár Katinka Battai; Renáta Katona; Liza Pusztai; Luca Szűcs	France; Sara Balzer; Sarah Noutcha; Anne Poupinet; Caroline Queroli	Japan; Misaki Emura; Shihomi Fukushima; Kanae Kobayashi; Seri Ozaki
