= Tamás Decsi =

Hungarian fencer (born 1982)

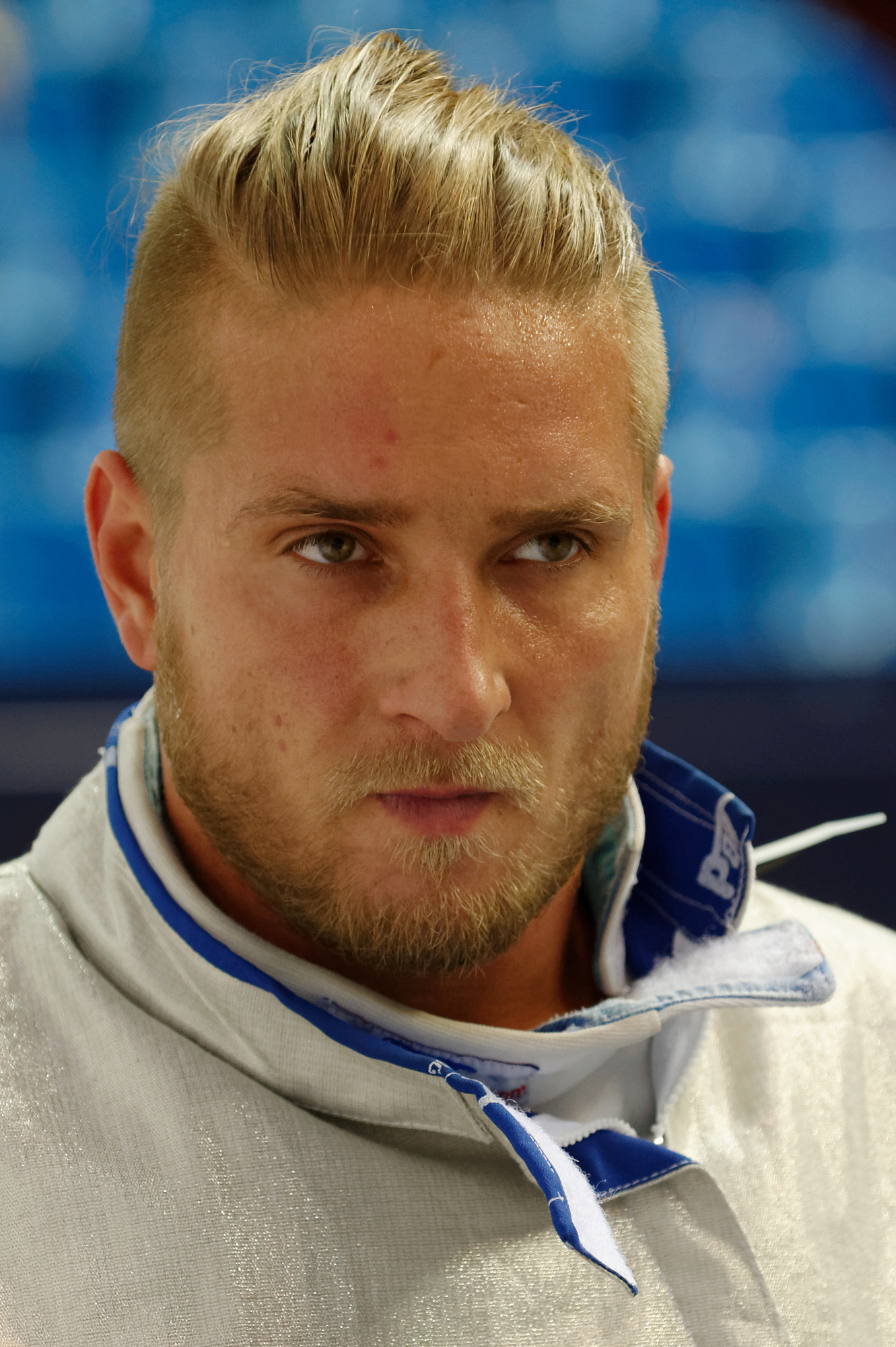
- Decsi at the 2015 World Fencing Championships

Personal information
- Born: 15 October 1982 (age 44) Kazincbarcika, Hungary
- Height: 1.80 m (5 ft 11 in)
- Weight: 84 kg (185 lb)

Fencing career
- Sport: Fencing
- Country: Hungary
- Weapon: Sabre
- Hand: right-handed
- National coach: István Decsi
- Club: Újpest (1993–1999); BSE (2000–2008); Kertvárosi VSE (2009–present)
- FIE ranking: current ranking
Medal record
Men's sabre
Representing Hungary
Event	1st	2nd	3rd
Olympic Games	0	0	1
World Championships	2	4	4
European Championships	3	2	3
Total	5	6	8
Olympic Games
Bronze medal – third place	2020 Tokyo	Team
World Championships
Gold medal – first place	2007 Saint Petersburg	Team
Gold medal – first place	2023 Milan	Team
Silver medal – second place	2016 Rio de Janeiro	Team
Silver medal – second place	2017 Leipzig	Team
Silver medal – second place	2019 Budapest	Team
Silver medal – second place	2022 Cairo	Team
Bronze medal – third place	2009 Antalya	Individual
Bronze medal – third place	2009 Antalya	Team
Bronze medal – third place	2014 Kazan	Team
Bronze medal – third place	2018 Wuxi	Team
European Championships
Gold medal – first place	2018 Novi Sad	Team
Gold medal – first place	2022 Antalya	Team
Gold medal – first place	2024 Basel	Team
Silver medal – second place	2006 İzmir	Team
Silver medal – second place	2019 Düsseldorf	Team
Bronze medal – third place	2002 Moscow	Team
Bronze medal – third place	2015 Montreux	Team
Bronze medal – third place	2017 Tbilisi	Team
Hungarian Fencing Championships
Silver medal – second place	2016 Budapest	Individual

Tamás Decsi (born 15 October 1982) is a Hungarian right-handed sabre fencer, 2018 team European champion, 2017 team world champion, three-time Olympian, and 2021 team Olympic bronze medalist. Decsi competed in the 2008 Beijing Olympic Games, the 2016 Rio de Janeiro Olympic Games, and the 2020 Tokyo Olympic Games.

== Medal record ==
=== Olympic Games ===
Year	Location	Event	Position
2021	Tokyo, Japan	Team Men's Sabre	3rd

=== World Championship ===
Year	Location	Event	Position
2007	St. Petersburg, Russia	Team Men's Sabre	1st
2009	Antalya, Turkey	Individual Men's Sabre	3rd
2009	Antalya, Turkey	Team Men's Sabre	3rd
2014	Kazan, Russia	Team Men's Sabre	3rd
2016	Rio de Janeiro, Brazil	Team Men's Sabre	2nd
2017	Leipzig, Germany	Team Men's Sabre	2nd
2018	Wuxi, China	Team Men's Sabre	3rd
2019	Budapest, Hungary	Team Men's Sabre	2nd

=== European Championship ===
Year	Location	Event	Position
2015	Montreux, Switzerland	Team Men's Sabre	3rd
2017	(Georgia (country)) Tbilisi, Georgia	Team Men's Sabre	3rd
2018	Novi Sad, Serbia	Team Men's Sabre	1st
2019	Düsseldorf, Germany	Team Men's Sabre	2nd

=== Grand Prix ===
Date	Location	Event	Position
23 May 2005	Madrid, Spain	Individual Men's Sabre	3rd
27 February 2009	Plovdiv, Bulgaria	Individual Men's Sabre	2nd
29 May 2015	Moscow, Russia	Individual Men's Sabre	3rd

=== World Cup ===
Date	Location	Event	Position
2 November 2005	Bangkok, Thailand	Individual Men's Sabre	3rd
26 May 2006	Sofia, Bulgaria	Individual Men's Sabre	2nd
1 December 2008	Kish Island, Iran	Individual Men's Sabre	3rd
5 March 2008	Bangkok, Thailand	Individual Men's Sabre	1st
30 May 2008	Padua, Italy	Individual Men's Sabre	1st
31 January 2009	Athens, Greece	Individual Men's Sabre	2nd
14 June 2009	Vargas, Venezuela	Individual Men's Sabre	1st
1 September 2010	Kish Island, Iran	Individual Men's Sabre	1st
30 January 2010	Athens, Greece	Individual Men's Sabre	3rd
13 June 2010	Margarita Island, Venezuela	Individual Men's Sabre	3rd

== Awards ==
- Hungarian Junior fencer of the Year: 2002
- Member of Hungarian fencing team of the Year: 2007
- Hungarian Fencer of the Year: 2009
