= Csanád Gémesi =

Hungarian fencer (born 1986)

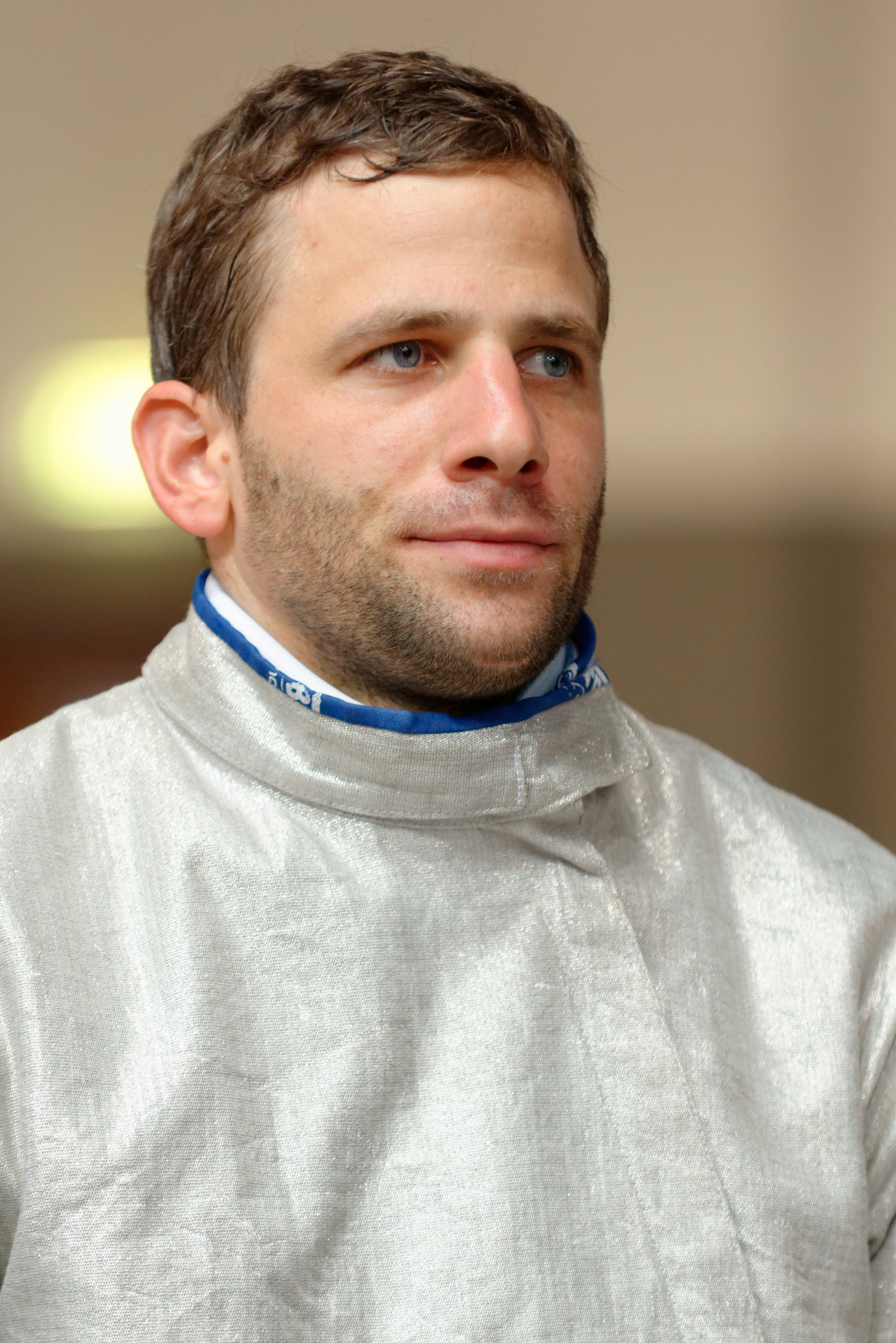
- Gémesi at the 2013 World Fencing Championships

Personal information
- Born: 13 November 1986 (age 39) Gödöllő, Hungary

Fencing career
- Sport: Fencing
- Country: Hungary
- Weapon: Sabre
- Hand: right-handed
- National coach: András Decsi
- Club: MATE-GEAC
- Head coach: József Navarrete
- Former coach: László Subert, Gergely Bokor
- FIE ranking: current ranking
Medal record
Men's sabre
Representing Hungary
Event	1st	2nd	3rd
Olympic Games	0	1	1
World Championships	1	4	2
European Championships	3	2	3
Total	4	7	6
Olympic Games
Silver medal – second place	2024 Paris	Team
Bronze medal – third place	2020 Tokyo	Team
World Championships
Gold medal – first place	2023 Milan	Team
Silver medal – second place	2017 Leipzig	Team
Silver medal – second place	2019 Budapest	Team
Silver medal – second place	2022 Cairo	Team
Silver medal – second place	2025 Tbilisi	Team
Bronze medal – third place	2014 Kazan	Team
Bronze medal – third place	2018 Wuxi	Team
European Championships
Gold medal – first place	2018 Novi Sad	Team
Gold medal – first place	2022 Antalya	Team
Gold medal – first place	2024 Basel	Team
Silver medal – second place	2013 Zagreb	Team
Silver medal – second place	2019 Düsseldorf	Team
Bronze medal – third place	2014 Strasbourg	Individual
Bronze medal – third place	2015 Montreaux	Team
Bronze medal – third place	2017 Tbilisi	Team

Csanád Gémesi (born 13 November 1986) is a Hungarian right-handed sabre fencer, 2018 team European champion, and 2021 team Olympic bronze medalist.

== Career ==
Gémesi won a bronze medal in the 2003 Cadet World Championships in Trapani. In 2013, he took part in his first World Championships, which were held that year in Hungary. He reached the quarter-finals, where he was defeated by team-mate and reigning Olympic champion Áron Szilágyi. The next season, he climbed his first World Cup podium with a silver medal in Madrid. On his first participation to European Championships, he made his way to the semi-finals. He was defeated by reigning World champion Veniamin Reshetnikov and came away with a bronze medal. In the World Championships in Kazan, he was eliminated in the first round by team Olympic champion Oh Eun-seok. In the team event, Hungary were defeated by Italy in the semi-finals, but prevailed over Russia to take the bronze medal.

== Medal record ==
=== Olympic Games ===
Year	Location	Event	Position
2021	Tokyo, Japan	Team Men's Sabre	3rd
2024	Paris, France	Team Men's Sabre	2nd

=== World Championship ===
Year	Location	Event	Position
2014	Kazan, Russia	Team Men's Sabre	3rd
2017	Leipzig, Germany	Team Men's Sabre	2nd
2018	Wuxi, China	Team Men's Sabre	3rd
2019	Budapest, Hungary	Team Men's Sabre	2nd
2025	(Georgia (country)) Tbilisi, Georgia	Team Men's Sabre	2nd

=== European Championship ===
Year	Location	Event	Position
2014	Strasbourg, France	Individual Men's Sabre	3rd
2013	Zagreb, Croatia	Team Men's Sabre	2nd
2015	Montreux, Switzerland	Team Men's Sabre	3rd
2017	(Georgia (country)) Tbilisi, Georgia	Team Men's Sabre	3rd
2018	Novi Sad, Serbia	Team Men's Sabre	1st
2019	Düsseldorf, Germany	Team Men's Sabre	2nd

=== Grand Prix ===
Date	Location	Event	Position
16 December 2016	Cancún, Mexico	Individual Men's Sabre	3rd

=== World Cup ===
Date	Location	Event	Position
2 July 2014	Madrid, Spain	Individual Men's Sabre	2nd
24 February 2017	Warsaw, Poland	Individual Men's Sabre	3rd
