= Luigi Samele (fencer) =

Italian fencer (born 1987)

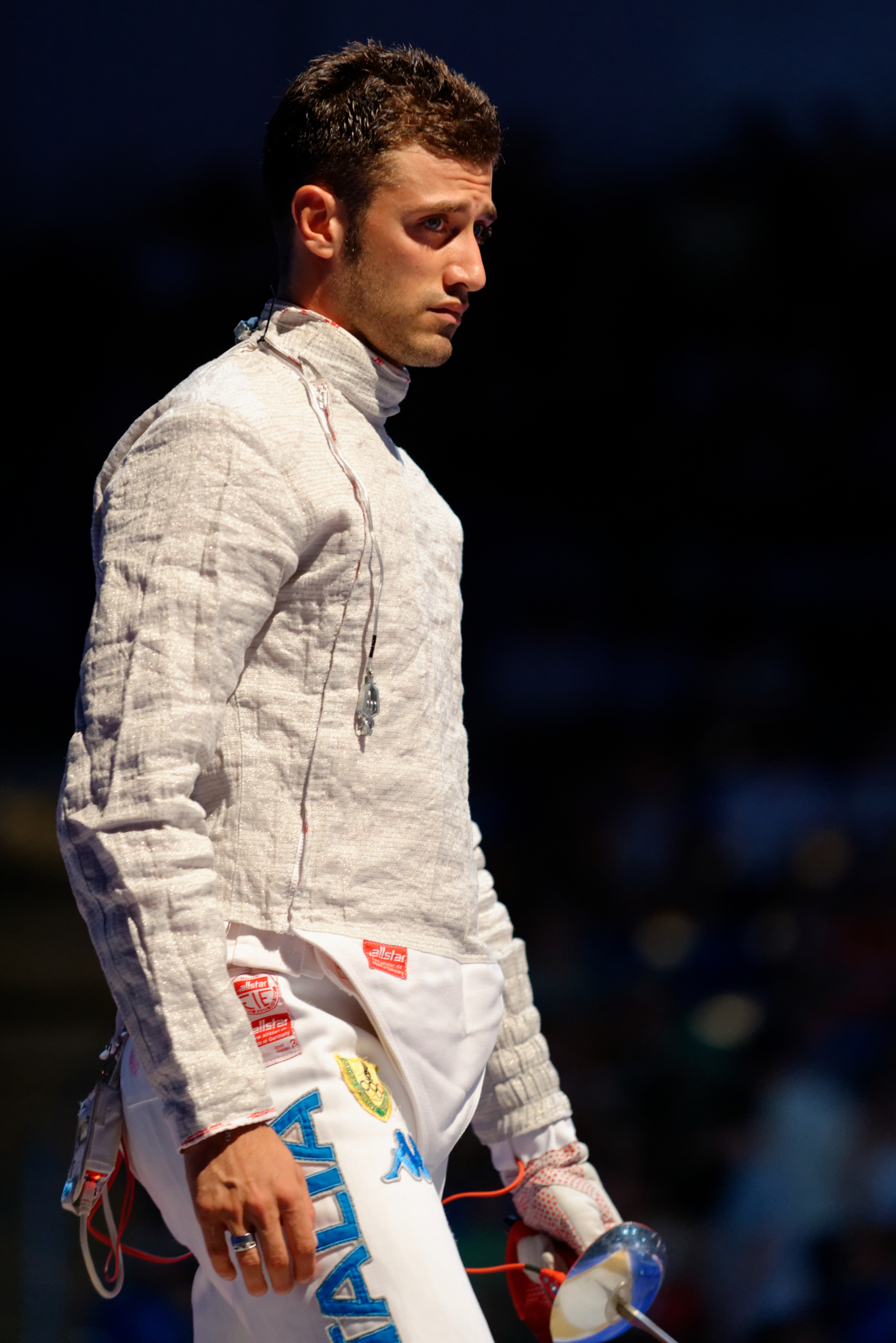
- Samele in 2013

Personal information
- Born: 25 July 1987 (age 39) Foggia, Italy
- Height: 1.90 m (6 ft 3 in)
- Weight: 73 kg (161 lb)

Fencing career
- Sport: Fencing
- Country: Italy
- Weapon: Sabre
- Hand: left-handed
- Club: Fiamme Gialle
- FIE ranking: current ranking
Medal record
Men's sabre
Representing Italy
Olympic Games
Olympic Games
Silver medal – second place	2020 Tokyo	Individual
Silver medal – second place	2020 Tokyo	Team
Bronze medal – third place	2012 London	Team
Bronze medal – third place	2024 Paris	Individual
World Championships
Silver medal – second place	2010 Paris	Team
Silver medal – second place	2018 Wuxi	Team
Bronze medal – third place	2017 Leipzig	Team
Bronze medal – third place	2019 Budapest	Team
Bronze medal – third place	2022 Cairo	Team
European Games
Silver medal – second place	2023 Kraków–Małopolska	Team
European Championships
Gold medal – first place	2010 Leipzig	Team
Gold medal – first place	2013 Zagreb	Team
Gold medal – first place	2014 Strasbourg	Team
Silver medal – second place	2016 Torun	Team
Silver medal – second place	2017 Tbilisi	Team
Silver medal – second place	2018 Novi Sad	Team
Silver medal – second place	2023 Kraków	Team
Bronze medal – third place	2019 Düsseldorf	Team
Bronze medal – third place	2024 Basel	Individual
World Cup
Gold medal – first place	2014 Chicago	Individual
Gold medal – first place	2016 Cancun	Individual

Luigi "Gigi" Samele (born 25 July 1987) is an Italian left-handed sabre fencer, three-time team European champion, two-time Olympian, and four-time Olympic medalist.

== Personal life ==
He is dating Ukrainian four-time world champion sabre fencer Olha Kharlan, and they live in Bologna, Italy.

== Medal record ==
=== Olympic Games ===
Year	Location	Event	Position
2012	London, United Kingdom	Team Men's Sabre	3rd
2021	Tokyo, Japan	Individual Men's Sabre	2nd
2021	Tokyo, Japan	Team Men's Sabre	2nd
2024	Paris, France	Individual Men's Sabre	3rd

=== World Championship ===
Year	Location	Event	Position
2010	Paris, France	Team Men's Sabre	2nd
2017	Leipzig, Germany	Team Men's Sabre	3rd
2018	Wuxi, China	Team Men's Sabre	2nd
2019	Budapest, Hungary	Team Men's Sabre	3rd

=== European Championship ===
Year	Location	Event	Position
2010	Leipzig, Germany	Team Men's Sabre	1st
2013	Zagreb, Croatia	Team Men's Sabre	1st
2014	Strasbourg, France	Team Men's Sabre	1st
2016	Toruń, Poland	Team Men's Sabre	2nd
2017	(Georgia (country)) Tbilisi, Georgia	Team Men's Sabre	2nd
2018	Novi Sad, Serbia	Team Men's Sabre	2nd
2019	Düsseldorf, Germany	Team Men's Sabre	3rd

=== Grand Prix ===
Date	Location	Event	Position
2010-02-12	Moscow, Russia	Individual Men's Sabre	3rd
2013-01-19	Plovdiv, Bulgaria	Individual Men's Sabre	3rd
2014-03-08	Budapest, Hungary	Individual Men's Sabre	3rd
2014-05-17	Warsaw, Poland	Individual Men's Sabre	3rd
2016-12-16	Cancún, Mexico	Individual Men's Sabre	1st
2020-01-10	Montreal, Canada	Individual Men's Sabre	3rd

=== World Cup ===
Date	Location	Event	Position
2009-01-31	Athens, Greece	Individual Men's Sabre	3rd
2009-06-19	(United States) Dallas, Texas	Individual Men's Sabre	3rd
2010-06-13	Margarita Island, Venezuela	Individual Men's Sabre	2nd
2013-05-03	(United States) Chicago, Illinois	Individual Men's Sabre	3rd
2014-02-14	Padua, Italy	Individual Men's Sabre	3rd
2014-05-02	(United States) Chicago, Illinois	Individual Men's Sabre	1st
2018-11-16	Algier, Algeria	Individual Men's Sabre	2nd
2019-11-15	Cairo, Egypt	Individual Men's Sabre	2nd
