= Men's sabre at the 2019 World Fencing Championships =

- Venue: SYMA Sports and Conference Centre
- Location: Budapest, Hungary
- Dates: 15–18 July

Medalists
gold medal	Oh Sang-uk	South Korea
silver medal	András Szatmári	Hungary
bronze medal	Mojtaba Abedini	Iran
bronze medal	Luca Curatoli	Italy

The Men's sabre competition at the 2019 World Fencing Championships was held on 18 July 2019. The qualification was held on 15 July.

== Draw ==
=== Finals ===
Semifinals
(Hungary) András Szatmári	15
(Iran) Mojtaba Abedini	8
(Italy) Luca Curatoli	11
(South Korea) Oh Sang-uk	15

Final
(Hungary) András Szatmári	12
(South Korea) Oh Sang-uk	15

=== Top half ===
==== Section 1 ====
Round of 64
(United States) Eli Dershwitz	15
(Singapore) Choy Yu Yong	7
(Romania) Iulian Teodosiu	13
(United Kingdom) William Deary	15
(Hungary) Csanád Gémesi	15
(Belgium) Arne De Ridder	7
(Canada) Joseph Polossifakis	13
(Italy) Aldo Montano	15
(Russia) Veniamin Reshetnikov	15
(United States) Jeff Spear	4
(Egypt) Mohamed Amer	15
(Hungary) Tamás Decsi	7
(Hungary) András Szatmári	15
(Georgia (country)) Mikheil Mardaleishvili	10
(China) Yan Yinghui	13
(South Korea) Kim Jun-ho	15

Round of 32
(United States) Eli Dershwitz	15
(United Kingdom) William Deary	13
(Hungary) Csanád Gémesi	15
(Italy) Aldo Montano	14
(Russia) Veniamin Reshetnikov	15
(Egypt) Mohamed Amer	12
(Hungary) András Szatmári	15
(South Korea) Kim Jun-ho	11

Round of 16
(United States) Eli Dershwitz	15
(Hungary) Csanád Gémesi	8
(Russia) Veniamin Reshetnikov	12
(Hungary) András Szatmári	15

Quarterfinals
(United States) Eli Dershwitz	12
(Hungary) András Szatmári	15

==== Section 2 ====
Round of 64
(Russia) Kamil Ibragimov	15
(Ukraine) Yuriy Tsap	5
(Egypt) Medhat Moataz	13
(Germany) Benedikt Wagner	15
(Iran) Mojtaba Abedini	15
(Japan) Kaito Streets	12
(China) Xu Yingming	14
(Tunisia) Farès Ferjani	15
(Italy) Enrico Berrè	15
(Germany) Björn Hübner-Fehrer	10
(United States) Khalil Thompson	14
(Romania) Tiberiu Dolniceanu	15
(China) Deng Xiaohao	15
(Romania) Florin Zalomir	12
(Canada) Fares Arfa	8
(Germany) Max Hartung	15

Round of 32
(Russia) Kamil Ibragimov	15
(Germany) Benedikt Wagner	12
(Iran) Mojtaba Abedini	15
(Tunisia) Farès Ferjani	13
(Italy) Enrico Berrè	13
(Romania) Tiberiu Dolniceanu	15
(China) Deng Xiaohao	12
(Germany) Max Hartung	15

Round of 16
(Russia) Kamil Ibragimov	9
(Iran) Mojtaba Abedini	15
(Romania) Tiberiu Dolniceanu	13
(Germany) Max Hartung	15

Quarterfinals
(Iran) Mojtaba Abedini	15
(Germany) Max Hartung	11

=== Bottom half ===
==== Section 3 ====
Round of 64
(Hungary) Áron Szilágyi	15
(Hong Kong) Low Ho Tin	11
(Japan) Kento Yoshida	15
(China) Wang Shi	6
(Iran) Ali Pakdaman	10
(Canada) Shaul Gordon	15
(South Korea) Ha Han-sol	15
(United States) Daryl Homer	12
(Georgia (country)) Sandro Bazadze	15
(Hong Kong) Aaron Ho	12
(Argentina) Pascual Di Tella	15
(France) Tom Seitz	14
(Iran) Mohammad Rahbari	15
(Turkey) Enver Yıldırım	5
(United Kingdom) Curtis Miller	7
(Italy) Luca Curatoli	15

Round of 32
(Hungary) Áron Szilágyi	14
(Japan) Kento Yoshida	15
(Canada) Shaul Gordon	15
(South Korea) Ha Han-sol	12
(Georgia (country)) Sandro Bazadze	15
(Argentina) Pascual Di Tella	7
(Iran) Mohammad Rahbari	8
(Italy) Luca Curatoli	15

Round of 16
(Japan) Kento Yoshida	12
(Canada) Shaul Gordon	15
(Georgia (country)) Sandro Bazadze	10
(Italy) Luca Curatoli	15

Quarterfinals
(Canada) Shaul Gordon	12
(Italy) Luca Curatoli	15

==== Section 4 ====
Round of 64
(France) Boladé Apithy	14
(Kazakhstan) Ilya Mokretsov	15
(Romania) Alin Badea	13
(Russia) Konstantin Lokhanov	15
(Argentina) Stefano Lucchetti	15
(Ukraine) Dmytro Pundyk	14
(Kazakhstan) Bakdaulet Kuralbekuly	8
(South Korea) Gu Bon-gil	15
(Italy) Luigi Samele	15
(Vietnam) Nguyễn Xuân Lợi	13
(Belarus) Kiryl Kirpichou	12
(Russia) Dmitriy Danilenko	15
(France) Vincent Anstett	15
(Iran) Mohammad Fotouhi	13
(Spain) Guillermo Mancheno	11
(South Korea) Oh Sang-uk	15

Round of 32
(Kazakhstan) Ilya Mokretsov	13
(Russia) Konstantin Lokhanov	15
(Argentina) Stefano Lucchetti	10
(South Korea) Gu Bon-gil	15
(Italy) Luigi Samele	15
(Russia) Dmitriy Danilenko	13
(France) Vincent Anstett	13
(South Korea) Oh Sang-uk	15

Round of 16
(Russia) Konstantin Lokhanov	15
(South Korea) Gu Bon-gil	7
(Italy) Luigi Samele	8
(South Korea) Oh Sang-uk	15

Quarterfinals
(Russia) Konstantin Lokhanov	9
(South Korea) Oh Sang-uk	15
