= Fencing at the 2024 Summer Olympics – Men's sabre =

Men's sabre at the Games of the XXXIII Olympiad
- Olympic fencing
- Venue: Grand Palais strip
- Date: 27 July 2024
- Competitors: 34 from 18 nations

Medalists
1st place, gold medalist(s)		Oh Sang-uk	South Korea
2nd place, silver medalist(s)		Farès Ferjani	Tunisia
3rd place, bronze medalist(s)		Luigi Samele	Italy

The men's sabre event at the 2024 Summer Olympics took place on 27 July 2024 at the Grand Palais strip.

== Background ==
This was the 30th appearance of the event, which was the only fencing event to have been held at every Summer Olympics. The three-time defending champion Áron Szilágyi lost in the round of 32, making his first loss since 2008.

== Competition format ==
The 1996 tournament had vastly simplified the competition format into a single-elimination bracket, with a bronze medal match. Fencing was done to 15 touches. Standard sabre rules regarding target area, striking, and priority were used.

== Schedule ==
The competition was held over a single day, Saturday, 27 July. Men's sabre bouts alternate with the women's épée event bouts.

All times use Central European Summer Time (UTC+2)

Date	Time	Round
Saturday, 27 July 2024	10:25; 12:30; 15:00; 16:15; 19:50; 21:05	Round of 64; Round of 32; Round of 16; Quarterfinals; Semifinals; Finals

== Results ==
=== Finals ===
Semifinals
Ziad El-Sissy (EGY)	11
Farès Ferjani (TUN)	15
Oh Sang-uk (KOR)	15
Luigi Samele (ITA)	5

Final
Farès Ferjani (TUN)	11
Oh Sang-uk (KOR)	15
Bronze medal bout
Ziad El-Sissy (EGY)	12
Luigi Samele (ITA)	15

=== Top half ===
==== Section 1 ====
Round of 64
François Cauchon (CAN)	13
Pascual di Tella (ARG)	15

Round of 32
Ziad El-Sissy (EGY)	15
Pascual di Tella (ARG)	11
Mitchell Saron (USA)	15
Maxime Pianfetti (FRA)	12
Matyas Szabo (GER)	15
Yousef Al-Shamlan (KUW)	6
Mohammad Rahbari (IRI)	13
Sébastien Patrice (FRA)	15

Round of 16
Ziad El-Sissy (EGY)	15
Mitchell Saron (USA)	13
Matyas Szabo (GER)	15
Sébastien Patrice (FRA)	13

Quarterfinals
Ziad El-Sissy (EGY)	15
Matyas Szabo (GER)	14

==== Section 2 ====
Round of 64

Round of 32
Colin Heathcock (USA)	10
Park Sang-won (KOR)	15
Shen Chenpeng (CHN)	15
Michele Gallo (ITA)	6
Farès Ferjani (TUN)	15
Gu Bon-gil (KOR)	8
Csanád Gémesi (HUN)	15
Eli Dershwitz (USA)	10

Round of 16
Park Sang-won (KOR)	11
Shen Chenpeng (CHN)	15
Farès Ferjani (TUN)	15
Csanád Gémesi (HUN)	14

Quarterfinals
Shen Chenpeng (CHN)	14
Farès Ferjani (TUN)	15

=== Bottom half ===
==== Section 3 ====
Round of 64

Round of 32
Oh Sang-uk (KOR)	15
Evann Girault (NIG)	8
Kento Yoshida (JPN)	11
Ali Pakdaman (IRI)	15
Boladé Apithy (FRA)	15
András Szatmári (HUN)	13
Fares Arfa (CAN)	15
Áron Szilágyi (HUN)	8

Round of 16
Oh Sang-uk (KOR)	15
Ali Pakdaman (IRI)	10
Boladé Apithy (FRA)	8
Fares Arfa (CAN)	15

Quarterfinals
Oh Sang-uk (KOR)	15
Fares Arfa (CAN)	13

==== Section 4 ====
Round of 64
Mohammad Fotouhi (IRI)	13
Gibrán Zea (MEX)	15

Round of 32
Luigi Samele (ITA)	15
Shaul Gordon (CAN)	10
Enver Yıldırım (TUR)	10
Luca Curatoli (ITA)	15
Adham Moataz (EGY)	8
Mohamed Amer (EGY)	15
Gibrán Zea (MEX)	6
Sandro Bazadze (GEO)	15

Round of 16
Luigi Samele (ITA)	15
Luca Curatoli (ITA)	12
Mohamed Amer (EGY)	15
Sandro Bazadze (GEO)	14

Quarterfinals
Luigi Samele (ITA)	15
Mohamed Amer (EGY)	13
