= Men's sabre at the 2017 World Fencing Championships =

- Venue: Arena Leipzig
- Location: Leipzig, Germany
- Dates: 21 July

Medalists
gold medal	András Szatmári	Hungary
silver medal	Gu Bon-gil	South Korea
bronze medal	Kamil Ibragimov	Russia
bronze medal	Vincent Anstett	France

The Men's sabre event of the 2017 World Fencing Championships was held on 21 July 2017. The qualification was held on 19 July 2017.

== Draw ==
=== Finals ===
Semi-finals
(Russia) Kamil Ibragimov	10
(South Korea) Gu Bon-gil	15
(France) Vincent Anstett	11
(Hungary) András Szatmári	15

Final
(South Korea) Gu Bon-gil	11
(Hungary) András Szatmári	15

=== Top half ===
==== Section 1 ====
Round of 64
1	(Hungary) Szilágyi	15
64	(Thailand) Haekerd	6
33	(United Kingdom) Honeybone	15
32	(Poland) Ociński	12
17	(Russia) Ibragimov	15
48	(Hong Kong) Lam	7
49	(United Kingdom) Deary	12
16	(Hungary) Gémesi	15
9	(South Korea) Oh	15
56	(United Kingdom) Miller	11
41	(Romania) Teodosiu	15
24	(South Korea) Kim Jun-h.	14
25	(Tunisia) Ferjani	5
40	(Russia) Danilenko	15
57	(Ukraine) Platonov	5
8	(Iran) Abedini	15

Round of 32
1	(Hungary) Szilágyi	15
33	(United Kingdom) Honeybone	10
17	(Russia) Ibragimov	15
16	(Hungary) Gémesi	10
9	(South Korea) Oh	15
41	(Romania) Teodosiu	13
40	(Russia) Danilenko	15
8	(Iran) Abedini	14

Round of 16
1	(Hungary) Szilágyi	12
17	(Russia) Ibragimov	15
9	(South Korea) Oh	15
40	(Russia) Danilenko	3

Quarterfinals
17	(Russia) Ibragimov	15
9	(South Korea) Oh	10

==== Section 2 ====
Round of 64
5	(Italy) Curatoli	15
60	(Thailand) Kitsiriboon	1
37	(Germany) Wagner	15
28	(United Kingdom) Webb	11
21	(Hungary) Decsi	15
44	(Japan) Tokunan	11
53	(Hong Kong) Low	10
12	(Italy) Samele	15
13	(Georgia (country)) S. Bazadze	15
52	(China) Qian	7
45	(Georgia (country)) B. Bazadze	11
20	(Romania) Dolniceanu	15
29	(France) Seitz	15
36	(Spain) Mancheno	12
61	(Poland) Lademann	9
4	(South Korea) Gu	15

Round of 32
5	(Italy) Curatoli	15
37	(Germany) Wagner	10
21	(Hungary) Decsi	5
12	(Italy) Samele	15
13	(Georgia (country)) S. Bazadze	15
20	(Romania) Dolniceanu	11
29	(France) Seitz	6
4	(South Korea) Gu	15

Round of 16
5	(Italy) Curatoli	15
12	(Italy) Samele	13
13	(Georgia (country)) S. Bazadze	13
4	(South Korea) Gu	15

Quarterfinals
5	(Italy) Curatoli	11
4	(South Korea) Gu	15

=== Bottom half ===
==== Section 3 ====
Round of 64
3	(United States) Homer	14
62	(Argentina) Di Tella	15
35	(Kazakhstan) Karim	11
30	(Belarus) Kirpichou	15
19	(Russia) Yakimenko	15
46	(Japan) Yoshida	4
51	(Iran) Pakdaman	15
14	(Italy) Berrè	13
11	(United States) Dershwitz	15
54	(Belarus) Shachanin	6
43	(Georgia (country)) Mardaleishvili	14
22	(France) Apithy	15
27	(Germany) Hübers	15
38	(Romania) Badea	10
59	(Japan) Fitz-Gerald	4
6	(France) Anstett	15

Round of 32
62	(Argentina) Di Tella	15
30	(Belarus) Kirpichou	5
19	(Russia) Yakimenko	14
51	(Iran) Pakdaman	15
11	(United States) Dershwitz	14
22	(France) Apithy	15
27	(Germany) Hübers	10
6	(France) Anstett	15

Round of 16
62	(Argentina) Di Tella	10
51	(Iran) Pakdaman	15
22	(France) Apithy	12
6	(France) Anstett	15

Quarterfinals
51	(Iran) Pakdaman	10
6	(France) Anstett	15

==== Section 4 ====
Round of 64
7	(Germany) Hartung	15
58	(Belgium) De Visscher	7
39	(United States) Spear	13
26	(Venezuela) Quintero	15
23	(Ukraine) Pundyk	15
42	(Ukraine) Statsenko	13
55	(Russia) Reshetnikov	11
10	(Hungary) Szatmári	15
15	(Italy) Montano	15
50	(Turkey) Yıldırım	12
47	(Kazakhstan) Mokretsov	7
18	(Germany) Szabo	15
31	(Romania) Bucur	12
34	(Israel) Voronov	15
63	(Argentina) Lucchetti	3
2	(South Korea) Kim Jung-h.	15

Round of 32
7	(Germany) Hartung	15
26	(Venezuela) Quintero	8
23	(Ukraine) Pundyk	7
10	(Hungary) Szatmári	15
15	(Italy) Montano	12
18	(Germany) Szabo	15
34	(Israel) Voronov	15
2	(South Korea) Kim Jung-h.	13

Round of 16
7	(Germany) Hartung	11
10	(Hungary) Szatmári	15
18	(Germany) Szabo	11
34	(Israel) Voronov	15

Quarterfinals
10	(Hungary) Szatmári	15
34	(Israel) Voronov	4
