= Fencing at the 2020 Summer Olympics – Men's sabre =

Fencing at the Olympics

Men's sabre at the Games of the XXXII Olympiad
- Olympic fencing
- Venue: Makuhari Messe
- Date: 24 July 2021
- Competitors: 36 from 18 nations

Medalists
1st place, gold medalist(s)		Áron Szilágyi	Hungary
2nd place, silver medalist(s)		Luigi Samele	Italy
3rd place, bronze medalist(s)		Kim Jung-hwan	South Korea

The men's sabre event at the 2020 Summer Olympics took place on 24 July 2021 at the Makuhari Messe. Thirty-six fencers from 18 nations competed. Two-time defending champion Hungary's Áron Szilágyi completed the three-peat by winning the gold medal.

== Background ==
This was the 29th appearance of the event, which is the only fencing event to have been held at every Summer Olympics.

The two-time reigning Olympic champion was Áron Szilágyi of Hungary. The reigning World Champion was Oh Sang-uk of South Korea. A preview from Olympics.com identified Szilágyi and Oh as among the strongest contenders in the event, although Oh was eliminated by Sandro Bazadze and failed to medal.

== Qualification ==
A National Olympic Committee (NOC) could enter up to 3 qualified fencers in the men's sabre. Nations were limited to three fencers each from 1928 to 2004. However, the 2008 Games introduced a rotation of men's team fencing events with one weapon left off each Games; the individual event without a corresponding team event had the number of fencers per nation reduced to two. Men's sabre was the third event this applied to, so each nation could enter a maximum of two fencers in the event in 2016. The 2020 Games eliminated this rotation and all weapons had team events.

There are 34 dedicated quota spots for men's sabre. The first 24 spots go to the 3 members of each of the 8 qualified teams in the team sabre event. Next, 6 more men are selected from the world rankings based on continents: 2 from Europe, 1 from the Americas, 2 from Asia/Oceania, and 1 from Africa. Finally, 4 spots are allocated by continental qualifying events: 1 from Europe, 1 from the Americas, 1 from Asia/Oceania, and 1 from Africa. Each nation can earn only one spot through rankings or events.

Additionally, there are 8 host/invitational spots that can be spread throughout the various fencing events. Japan used 2 host places to fill its men's sabre team (adding to the 1 place earned through general qualification).

The COVID-19 pandemic delayed many of the events for qualifying for fencing, moving the close of the rankings period back to April 5, 2021 rather than the original April 4, 2020.

== Competition format ==
The 1996 tournament had vastly simplified the competition format into a single-elimination bracket, with a bronze medal match. The 2020 tournament continued to use that format. Fencing is done to 15 touches or to the completion of three three-minute rounds if neither fencer reaches 15 touches by then. At the end of time, the higher-scoring fencer is the winner; a tie results in an additional one-minute sudden-death time period. This sudden-death period is further modified by the selection of a draw-winner beforehand; if neither fencer scores a touch during the minute, the predetermined draw-winner wins the bout. Standard sabre rules regarding target area, striking, and priority are used.

== Schedule ==
The competition was held over a single day, Saturday, 24 July. The first session was scheduled to run from 9 a.m. to approximately 4:20 p.m. (when the quarterfinals were expected to conclude), after which there was a break until 6 p.m. before the semifinals and medal bouts were held. Men's sabre bouts alternate with the women's épée event bouts.

All times are Japan Standard Time (UTC+9)

Date	Time	Round
Saturday, 24 July 2021	9:00 18:00	Round of 64; Round of 32; Round of 16; Quarterfinals; Semifinals; Finals

== Results ==
=== Finals ===
Semifinals
Sandro Bazadze (GEO)	13
Áron Szilágyi (HUN)	15
Luigi Samele (ITA)	15
Kim Jung-hwan (KOR)	12

Final
Áron Szilágyi (HUN)	15
Luigi Samele (ITA)	7
Bronze medal bout
Sandro Bazadze (GEO)	11
Kim Jung-hwan (KOR)	15

=== Top half ===
==== Section 1 ====
Round of 64
Tomohiro Shimamura (JPN)	13
Andrew Mackiewicz (USA)	15

Round of 32
Oh Sang-uk (KOR)	15
Andrew Mackiewicz (USA)	7
Mohamed Amer (EGY)	15
Daryl Homer (USA)	11
Veniamin Reshetnikov (ROC)	13
Ziad El-Sissy (EGY)	15
Mohab Samer (EGY)	10
Sandro Bazadze (GEO)	15

Round of 16
Oh Sang-uk (KOR)	15
Mohamed Amer (EGY)	9
Ziad El-Sissy (EGY)	12
Sandro Bazadze (GEO)	15

Quarterfinals
Oh Sang-uk (KOR)	13
Sandro Bazadze (GEO)	15

==== Section 2 ====
Round of 64
Kento Yoshida (JPN)	13
José Quintero (VEN)	15

Round of 32
Max Hartung (GER)	15
Tamás Decsi (HUN)	8
Ali Pakdaman (IRI)	15
András Szatmári (HUN)	12
Mojtaba Abedini (IRI)	15
Shaul Gordon (CAN)	10
José Quintero (VEN)	7
Áron Szilágyi (HUN)	15

Round of 16
Max Hartung (GER)	9
Ali Pakdaman (IRI)	15
Mojtaba Abedini (IRI)	7
Áron Szilágyi (HUN)	15

Quarterfinals
Ali Pakdaman (IRI)	6
Áron Szilágyi (HUN)	15

=== Bottom half ===
==== Section 3 ====
Round of 64
Sherzod Mamutov (UZB)	11
Iulian Teodosiu (ROU)	15

Round of 32
Luca Curatoli (ITA)	13
Iulian Teodosiu (ROU)	15
Enrico Berrè (ITA)	15
Farès Ferjani (TUN)	10
Luigi Samele (ITA)	15
Xu Yingming (CHN)	12
Mohammad Rahbari (IRI)	15
Boladé Apithy (FRA)	13

Round of 16
Iulian Teodosiu (ROU)	12
Enrico Berrè (ITA)	15
Luigi Samele (ITA)	15
Mohammad Rahbari (IRI)	7

Quarterfinals
Enrico Berrè (ITA)	10
Luigi Samele (ITA)	15

==== Section 4 ====
Round of 64
Kaito Streets (JPN)	15
Akram Bounabi (ALG)	9

Round of 32
Kamil Ibragimov (ROC)	15
Benedikt Wagner (GER)	13
Matyas Szabo (GER)	15
Gu Bon-gil (KOR)	8
Kim Jung-hwan (KOR)	15
Konstantin Lokhanov (ROC)	11
Kaito Streets (JPN)	9
Eli Dershwitz (USA)	15

Round of 16
Kamil Ibragimov (ROC)	15
Matyas Szabo (GER)	13
Kim Jung-hwan (KOR)	15
Eli Dershwitz (USA)	9

Quarterfinals
Kamil Ibragimov (ROC)	14
Kim Jung-hwan (KOR)	15
