= Men's sabre at the 2015 World Fencing Championships =

The Men's sabre event of the 2015 World Fencing Championships was held on 14 July 2015. The qualification was held on 13 July 2015.

== Medalists ==
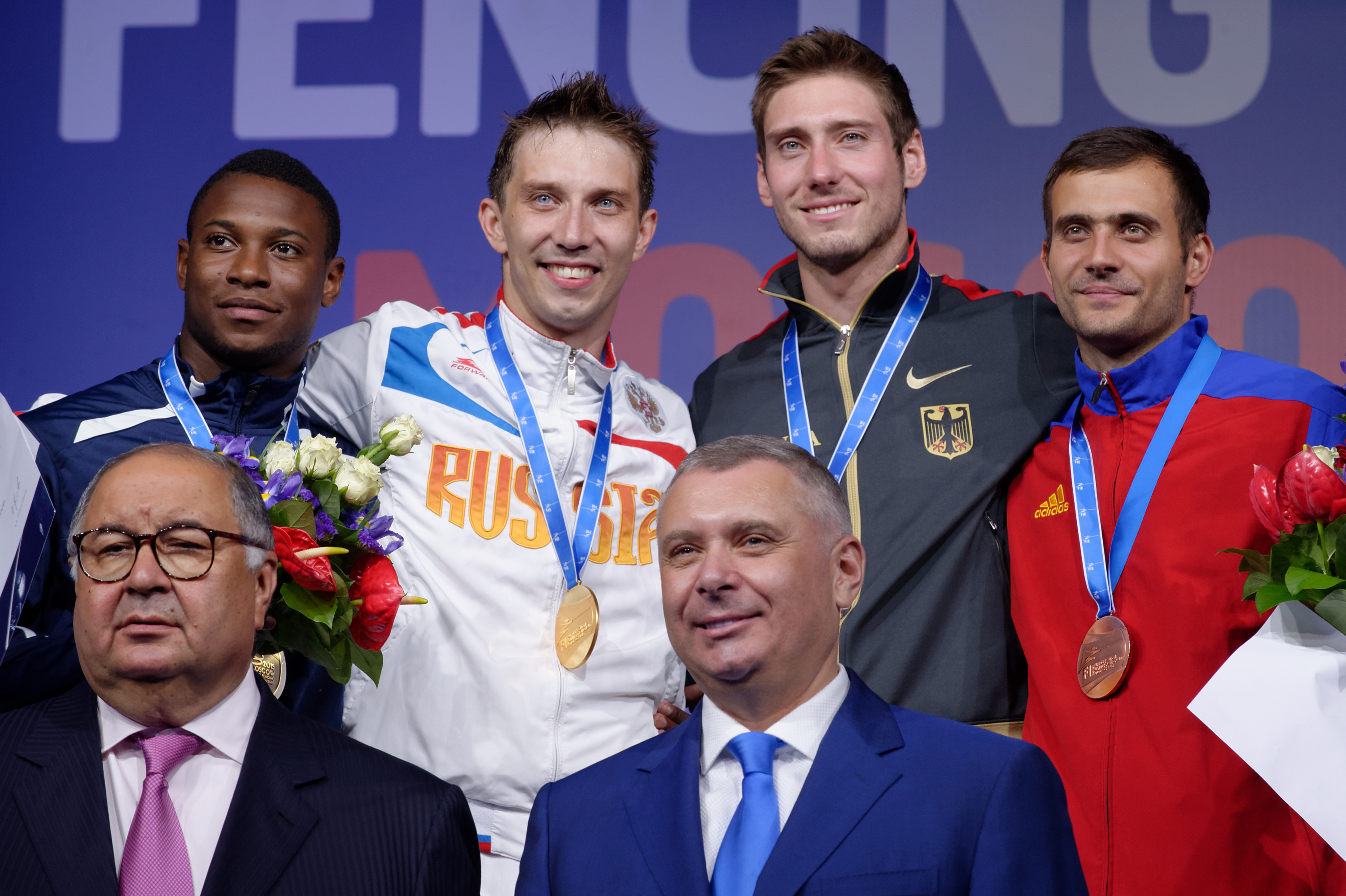
From L to R, Daryl Homer, Aleksey Yakimenko, Max Hartung and Tiberiu Dolniceanu

| Gold | (Russia) Aleksey Yakimenko |
| Silver | (United States) Daryl Homer |
| Bronze | (Romania) Tiberiu Dolniceanu |
| Bronze | (Germany) Max Hartung |

== Draw ==
=== Finals ===
Semi-finals
(United States) Daryl Homer | 15
(Romania) Tiberiu Dolniceanu | 14
(Russia) Aleksey Yakimenko | 15
(Germany) Max Hartung | 6

Final
(United States) Daryl Homer | 5
(Russia) Aleksey Yakimenko | 15

=== Top half ===
==== Section 1 ====
Round of 64
1 | (South Korea) Gu Bon-gil | 15
64 | (China) Lulu Huang | 6
33 | (Iran) Mojtaba Abedini | 15
32 | (Benin) Yémi Geoffrey Apithy | 7
17 | (Ukraine) Andriy Yagodka | 14
48 | (Brazil) Renzo Agresta | 15
49 | (Spain) Guillermo Mancheno | 12
16 | (France) Nicolas Rousset | 15
9 | (United States) Daryl Homer | 15
56 | (Egypt) Ahmed Amr | 6
41 | (Romania) Iulian Teodosiu | 12
24 | (Georgia (country)) Sandro Bazadze | 15
25 | (France) Boladé Apithy | 15
40 | (Israel) Alexandre Woog | 9
57 | (Poland) Marcin Koniusz | 10
8 | (Russia) Kamil Ibragimov | 15

Round of 32
1 | (South Korea) Gu Bon-gil | 15
33 | (Iran) Mojtaba Abedini | 7
48 | (Brazil) Renzo Agresta | 15
16 | (France) Nicolas Rousset | 14
9 | (United States) Daryl Homer | 15
24 | (Georgia (country)) Sandro Bazadze | 10
25 | (France) Boladé Apithy | 15
8 | (Russia) Kamil Ibragimov | 9

Round of 16
1 | (South Korea) Gu Bon-gil | 15
48 | (Brazil) Renzo Agresta | 13
9 | (United States) Daryl Homer | 15
25 | (France) Boladé Apithy | 14

Quarterfinals
1 | (South Korea) Gu Bon-gil | 11
9 | (United States) Daryl Homer | 15

==== Section 2 ====
Round of 64
5 | (Russia) Nikolay Kovalev | 15
60 | (Vietnam) Vu Thanh An | 8
37 | (Iran) Ali Pakdaman | 15
28 | (Hungary) Nikolasz Iliasz | 12
21 | (South Korea) Oh Eun-seok | 15
44 | (Kazakhstan) Ilya Mokretcov | 12
53 | (Austria) Mathias Willau | 7
12 | (Germany) Nicolas Limbach | 15
13 | (Italy) Diego Occhiuzzi | 15
52 | (United Kingdom) Alexander Crutchett | 11
45 | (Ukraine) Dmytro Pundyk | 2
20 | (Russia) Veniamin Reshetnikov | 15
29 | (Japan) Kenta Tokunan | 15
36 | (United States) Jeff Spear | 13
61 | (Spain) Pablo Moreno | 13
4 | (Romania) Tiberiu Dolniceanu | 15

Round of 32
5 | (Russia) Nikolay Kovalev | 15
37 | (Iran) Ali Pakdaman | 14
21 | (South Korea) Oh Eun-seok | 15
12 | (Germany) Nicolas Limbach | 11
13 | (Italy) Diego Occhiuzzi | 12
20 | (Russia) Veniamin Reshetnikov | 15
29 | (Japan) Kenta Tokunan | 9
4 | (Romania) Tiberiu Dolniceanu | 15

Round of 16
5 | (Russia) Nikolay Kovalev | 8
21 | (South Korea) Oh Eun-seok | 15
20 | (Russia) Veniamin Reshetnikov | 9
4 | (Romania) Tiberiu Dolniceanu | 15

Quarterfinals
21 | (South Korea) Oh Eun-seok | 14
4 | (Romania) Tiberiu Dolniceanu | 15

=== Bottom half ===
==== Section 3 ====
Round of 64
3 | (South Korea) Kim Jung-hwan | 15
62 | (Iran) Mohammad Fotouhi | 6
35 | (Belgium) Seppe van Holsbeke | 15
30 | (Iran) Mohammad Rahbari | 8
19 | (Belarus) Aliaksandr Buikevich | 15
46 | (China) Xu Yingming | 11
51 | (Georgia (country)) Mikheil Mardaleishvili | 13
14 | (France) Vincent Anstett | 15
11 | (South Korea) Won Woo-young | 15
54 | (United States) Eli Dershwitz | 13
43 | (France) Julien Médard | 15
22 | (Germany) Benedikt Wagner | 9
27 | (Egypt) Mohamed Amer | 13
38 | (Hungary) András Szatmári | 15
59 | (Tunisia) Hichem Samandi | 5
6 | (Russia) Aleksey Yakimenko | 15

Round of 32
3 | (South Korea) Kim Jung-hwan | 15
35 | (Belgium) Seppe van Holsbeke | 7
19 | (Belarus) Aliaksandr Buikevich | 15
14 | (France) Vincent Anstett | 14
11 | (South Korea) Won Woo-young | 15
43 | (France) Julien Médard | 14
38 | (Hungary) András Szatmári | 12
6 | (Russia) Aleksey Yakimenko | 15

Round of 16
3 | (South Korea) Kim Jung-hwan | 15
19 | (Belarus) Aliaksandr Buikevich | 8
11 | (South Korea) Won Woo-young | 9
6 | (Russia) Aleksey Yakimenko | 15

Quarterfinals
3 | (South Korea) Kim Jung-hwan | 13
6 | (Russia) Aleksey Yakimenko | 15

==== Section 4 ====
Round of 64
7 | (Italy) Aldo Montano | 15
58 | (China) Sun Wei | 9
39 | (Spain) Fernando Casares | 15
26 | (Romania) Alin Badea | 9
23 | (Canada) Joseph Polossifakis | 15
42 | (Hungary) Tamás Decsi | 9
55 | (Egypt) Ziad Elsissy | 8
10 | (Germany) Max Hartung | 15
15 | (Germany) Matyas Szabo | 15
50 | (Ukraine) Dmytro Boiko | 10
47 | (Belarus) Siarhei Shachanin | 6
18 | (Italy) Luca Curatoli | 15
31 | (Italy) Enrico Berrè | 15
34 | (Argentina) Ricardo Bustamante | 8
63 | (Mexico) Eduardo Lara | 4
2 | (Hungary) Áron Szilágyi | 15

Round of 32
7 | (Italy) Aldo Montano | 15
39 | (Spain) Fernando Casares | 8
23 | (Canada) Joseph Polossifakis | 11
10 | (Germany) Max Hartung | 15
15 | (Germany) Matyas Szabo | 13
18 | (Italy) Luca Curatoli | 15
31 | (Italy) Enrico Berrè | 13
2 | (Hungary) Áron Szilágyi | 15

Round of 16
7 | (Italy) Aldo Montano | 11
10 | (Germany) Max Hartung | 15
18 | (Italy) Luca Curatoli | 10
2 | (Hungary) Áron Szilágyi | 15

Quarterfinals
10 | (Germany) Max Hartung | 15
2 | (Hungary) Áron Szilágyi | 11
