= Fencing at the 2020 Summer Olympics – Men's team sabre =

Men's team sabre at the Games of the XXXII Olympiad
- Olympic fencing
- Venue: Makuhari Messe
- Date: 28 July 2021
- Competitors: 36 from 9 nations

Medalists
1st place, gold medalist(s)		Oh Sang-uk; Kim Jun-ho; Kim Jung-hwan; Gu Bon-gil	South Korea
2nd place, silver medalist(s)		Luca Curatoli; Luigi Samele; Enrico Berrè; Aldo Montano	Italy
3rd place, bronze medalist(s)		Áron Szilágyi; András Szatmári; Tamás Decsi; Csanád Gémesi	Hungary

The men's team sabre event at the 2020 Summer Olympics took place on 28 July 2021 at the Makuhari Messe, with 27 fencers (9 teams of 3) from 9 nations competing.

== Background ==
Officially the 25th appearance of the event, it has been held at every Summer Olympics since 1908 except 2016 (during the time when team events were rotated off the schedule, with only two of the three weapons for each of the men's and women's categories).

The reigning (2012) Olympic champion is South Korea (Gu Bon-gil, Won Woo-young, Kim Jung-hwan, and Oh Eun-seok). South Korea has also won the last three World Championships in the event, with the 2019 (reigning) team consisting of Gu, Kim Jun-ho, Oh Sang-uk and Ha Han-sol. A preview from Olympics.com identified Hungary as a historically strong nation in the event looking to continue its success, led by 2012 and 2016 individual gold medalist Áron Szilágyi. Szilágyi in the meanwhile also won the 2020 gold medal in individual sabre competition.

== Qualification ==
A National Olympic Committee (NOC) could enter a team of 3 fencers in the men's team sabre. These fencers also automatically qualified for the individual event.

There are 8 dedicated quota spots for men's team sabre. They are allocated as through the world team ranking list of 5 April 2021. The top 4 spots, regardless of geographic zone, qualify (South Korea, Hungary, Italy, and Germany). The next four spots are allocated to separate geographic zones, as long as an NOC from that zone is in the top 16. These places went to Iran (Asia/Oceania), the United States (Americas), Egypt (Africa), and ROC (Europe).

Additionally, there are 8 host/invitational spots that can be spread throughout the various fencing events. Japan qualified one men's sabre fencer through normal individual qualification and used two host quota places to complete a men's sabre team.

The COVID-19 pandemic delayed many of the events for qualifying for fencing, moving the close of the rankings period back to April 5, 2021, rather than the original April 4, 2020.

== Competition format ==
The 2020 tournament is a single-elimination tournament, with classification matches for all places. Each match features the three fencers on each team competing in a round-robin, with 9 three-minute bouts to 5 points; the winning team is the one that reaches 45 total points first or is leading after the end of the nine bouts. Standard sabre rules regarding target area, striking, and priority are used.

== Schedule ==
The competition is held over a single day, Wednesday, 28 July. The first session runs from 10 a.m. to approximately 3:20 p.m. (when all matches except the bronze and gold medal finals are expected to conclude), after which there is a break until 6:30 p.m. before the medal bouts are held.

All times are Japan Standard Time (UTC+9)

Date	Time	Round
Wednesday, 28 July 2021	10:00 18:30	Round of 16; Quarterfinals; Semifinals; Classification 7/8; Classification 5/6; Bronze medal match Gold medal match

== Results ==
Round of 16
Japan	32
Egypt	45

Quarter-finals
South Korea	45
Egypt	39
ROC	28
Germany	45
Italy	45
Iran	44
United States	36
Hungary	45

Semi-finals
South Korea	45
Germany	42
Italy	45
Hungary	43

Final
South Korea	45
Italy	26
Bronze medal bout
Germany	40
Hungary	45

5–8th place classification

5–8th place semifinals
Egypt	45
ROC	41
Iran	45
United States	36

Fifth place bout
Egypt	45
Iran	24
Seventh place bout
ROC	WO
United States

== Final classification ==
Rank	Team	Athlete
1st place, gold medalist(s)	South Korea	Oh Sang-uk; Kim Jun-ho; Kim Jung-hwan; Gu Bon-gil
2nd place, silver medalist(s)	Italy	Luca Curatoli; Luigi Samele; Enrico Berrè; Aldo Montano
3rd place, bronze medalist(s)	Hungary	Áron Szilágyi; András Szatmári; Tamás Decsi; Csanád Gémesi
4	Germany	Max Hartung; Benedikt Wagner; Richard Hübers; Matyas Szabo
5	Egypt	Mohamed Amer; Ziad El-Sissy; Medhat Moataz; Mohab Samer
6	Iran	Mojtaba Abedini; Mohammad Fotouhi; Ali Pakdaman; Mohammad Rahbari
7	ROC	Dmitriy Danilenko; Kamil Ibragimov; Konstantin Lokhanov; Veniamin Reshetnikov
8	United States	Eli Dershwitz; Daryl Homer; Andrew Mackiewicz; Khalil Thompson
9	Japan	Tomohiro Shimamura; Kaito Streets; Kenta Tokunan; Kento Yoshida
