= Fencing at the 2022 Asian Games – Men's team sabre =

Men's team sabre at the 2022 Asian Games
- Venue: Hangzhou Dianzi University Gymnasium
- Date: 28 September 2023
- Competitors: 46 from 12 nations

Medalists
gold medal	South Korea; Gu Bon-gil, Kim Jun-ho, Kim Jung-hwan, Oh Sang-uk
silver medal	China; Liang Jianhao, Lin Xiao, Shen Chenpeng, Yan Yinghui
bronze medal	Kazakhstan; Zhanat Nabiyev, Mukhamedali Rakhmanali, Artyom Sarkissyan, Nazarbay Sattarkhan
bronze medal	Iran; Farzad Baher, Mohammad Fotouhi, Ali Pakdaman, Mohammad Rahbari

The men's team sabre competition at the 2022 Asian Games in Hangzhou was held on 28 September 2023 at the Hangzhou Dianzi University Gymnasium.

== Schedule ==
All times are China Standard Time (UTC+08:00)

Date	Time	Event
Thursday, 28 September 2023	09:00	Table of 16
Thursday, 28 September 2023	10:00	Quarterfinals
Thursday, 28 September 2023	11:00	Semifinals
Thursday, 28 September 2023	18:00	Gold medal match

== Seeding ==
The teams were seeded taking into account the results achieved by competitors representing each team in the individual event.

Rank	Team	Fencer		Total
Rank	Team	1	2	Total
1	South Korea (KOR)	1	2	3
2	China (CHN)	5	7	12
3	Iran (IRI)	3	10	13
4	Kuwait (KUW)	3	16	19
5	Kazakhstan (KAZ)	8	14	22
6	Hong Kong (HKG)	9	13	22
7	Uzbekistan (UZB)	6	17	23
8	Japan (JPN)	11	12	23
9	Saudi Arabia (KSA)	15	21	36
10	Vietnam (VIE)	19	23	42
11	Thailand (THA)	20	24	44
12	Nepal (NEP)	25	26	51

== Results ==
Table of 16
9	Saudi Arabia	36
8	Japan	45
5	Kazakhstan	45
12	Nepal	15
11	Thailand	31
6	Hong Kong	45
7	Uzbekistan	45
10	Vietnam	40

Quarterfinals
1	South Korea	45
8	Japan	26
5	Kazakhstan	45
4	Kuwait	43
3	Iran	45
6	Hong Kong	39
7	Uzbekistan	31
2	China	45

Semifinals
1	South Korea	45
5	Kazakhstan	41
3	Iran	41
2	China	45

Gold medal match
1	South Korea	45
2	China	33

== Final standing ==
Rank	Team
1st place, gold medalist(s)	South Korea (KOR); Gu Bon-gil; Kim Jun-ho; Kim Jung-hwan; Oh Sang-uk
2nd place, silver medalist(s)	China (CHN); Liang Jianhao; Lin Xiao; Shen Chenpeng; Yan Yinghui
3rd place, bronze medalist(s)	Kazakhstan (KAZ); Zhanat Nabiyev; Mukhamedali Rakhmanali; Artyom Sarkissyan; Nazarbay Sattarkhan
3rd place, bronze medalist(s)	Iran (IRI); Farzad Baher; Mohammad Fotouhi; Ali Pakdaman; Mohammad Rahbari
5	Kuwait (KUW); Mohammad Abdulkareem; Mohammad Al-Fadhli; Yousef Al-Shamlan; Ali Rostom
6	Hong Kong (HKG); Royce Chan; Chow Chung Hei; Aaron Ho; Low Ho Tin
7	Uzbekistan (UZB); Islambek Abdazov; Musa Aymuratov; Zukhriddin Kodirov; Sherzod Mamutov
8	Japan (JPN); Mao Kokubo; Kaito Streets; Hayato Tsubo; Kento Yoshida
9	Saudi Arabia (KSA); Mohammed Al-Amr; Adel Al-Mutairi; Abdullah Al-Mansaf; Ahmed Al-Qudihi
10	Vietnam (VIE); Nguyễn Văn Quyết; Nguyễn Xuân Lợi; Vũ Thành An
11	Thailand (THA); Phongphipat Ngam-nuch; Kanisorn Pangmoon; Voragun Srinualnad; Panachai Wiriyatangsakul
12	Nepal (NEP); Rajendra Gajurel; Upendra Bahadur Shahi; Payas Yonjan
