= 2022 Asian Fencing Championships =

Fencing Championship

- Host city: Seoul, South Korea
- Dates: 10–15 June 2022
- Main venue: SK Olympic Handball Gymnasium

The 2022 Asian Fencing Championships were held in Seoul, South Korea from 10 to 15 June 2022 at the SK Olympic Handball Gymnasium.

== Medal summary ==
=== Men ===
Event	Gold	Silver	Bronze
Individual épée	Koki Kano; Japan	Akira Komata; Japan	Park Sang-young; South Korea
Individual épée	Koki Kano; Japan	Akira Komata; Japan	Lan Minghao; China
Team épée	South Korea; Kim Myeong-ki; Kweon Young-jun; Park Sang-young; Son Tae-jin	Uzbekistan; Roman Aleksandrov; Fayzulla Alimov; Nodirbek Muminov; Javokhirbek Nurmatov	Japan; Koki Kano; Akira Komata; Ryu Matsumoto; Masaru Yamada
Team épée	South Korea; Kim Myeong-ki; Kweon Young-jun; Park Sang-young; Son Tae-jin	Uzbekistan; Roman Aleksandrov; Fayzulla Alimov; Nodirbek Muminov; Javokhirbek Nurmatov	China; Lan Minghao; Liu Yongchuang; Wang Zijie; Yu Lefan
Individual foil	Cheung Ka Long; Hong Kong	Mo Ziwei; China	Wu Bin; China
Individual foil	Cheung Ka Long; Hong Kong	Mo Ziwei; China	Ryan Choi; Hong Kong
Team foil	Japan; Kazuki Iimura; Kyosuke Matsuyama; Takahiro Shikine; Kenta Suzumura	South Korea; Ha Tae-gyu; Heo Jun; Im Cheol-woo; Kim Dong-su	Hong Kong; Cheung Ka Long; Ryan Choi; Lawrence Ng; Yeung Chi Ka
Team foil	Japan; Kazuki Iimura; Kyosuke Matsuyama; Takahiro Shikine; Kenta Suzumura	South Korea; Ha Tae-gyu; Heo Jun; Im Cheol-woo; Kim Dong-su	Chinese Taipei; Chen Chih-chieh; Chen Yi-tung; Liu Yin-yuan; Yueh Che-hao
Individual sabre	Gu Bon-gil; South Korea	Kim Jung-hwan; South Korea	Oh Sang-uk; South Korea
Individual sabre	Gu Bon-gil; South Korea	Kim Jung-hwan; South Korea	Artyom Sarkissyan; Kazakhstan
Team sabre	South Korea; Gu Bon-gil; Kim Jung-hwan; Kim Jun-ho; Oh Sang-uk	Japan; Kento Hoshino; Mao Kokubo; Kaito Streets; Kento Yoshida	Iran; Mohammad Fotouhi; Ali Pakdaman; Mohammad Rahbari; Nima Zahedi
Team sabre	South Korea; Gu Bon-gil; Kim Jung-hwan; Kim Jun-ho; Oh Sang-uk	Japan; Kento Hoshino; Mao Kokubo; Kaito Streets; Kento Yoshida	Hong Kong; Chan Cheuk Him; Cyrus Chang; Aaron Ho; Low Ho Tin

=== Women ===
Event	Gold	Silver	Bronze
Individual épée	Vivian Kong; Hong Kong	Choi In-jeong; South Korea	Chan Wai Ling; Hong Kong
Individual épée	Vivian Kong; Hong Kong	Choi In-jeong; South Korea	Nozomi Sato; Japan
Team épée	South Korea; Choi In-jeong; Kang Young-mi; Lee Hye-in; Song Se-ra	Hong Kong; Chan Wai Ling; Chu Ka Mong; Vivian Kong; Coco Lin	Japan; Haruna Baba; Yume Kuroki; Nozomi Sato; Miho Yoshimura
Team épée	South Korea; Choi In-jeong; Kang Young-mi; Lee Hye-in; Song Se-ra	Hong Kong; Chan Wai Ling; Chu Ka Mong; Vivian Kong; Coco Lin	China; Huang Qianqian; Ma Yingjia; Song Yue; Zhu Mingye
Individual foil	Shi Yue; China	Chen Qingyuan; China	Yuka Ueno; Japan
Individual foil	Shi Yue; China	Chen Qingyuan; China	Sera Azuma; Japan
Team foil	Japan; Sera Azuma; Komaki Kikuchi; Karin Miyawaki; Yuzuha Takeyama	China; Cai Yuanting; Chen Qingyuan; Shi Yue; Wu Peilin	South Korea; Chae Song-oh; Hong Hyo-jin; Hong Seo-in; Kim Ki-yeun
Team foil	Japan; Sera Azuma; Komaki Kikuchi; Karin Miyawaki; Yuzuha Takeyama	China; Cai Yuanting; Chen Qingyuan; Shi Yue; Wu Peilin	Singapore; Amita Berthier; Denyse Chan; Cheung Kemei; Maxine Wong
Individual sabre	Choi Soo-yeon; South Korea	Misaki Emura; Japan	Fu Ying; China
Individual sabre	Choi Soo-yeon; South Korea	Misaki Emura; Japan	Yang Hengyu; China
Team sabre	South Korea; Choi Soo-yeon; Kim Jeong-mi; Kim Ji-yeon; Yoon Ji-su	Japan; Misaki Emura; Shihomi Fukushima; Kanae Kobayashi; Seri Ozaki	China; Fu Ying; Guo Yiqi; Yang Hengyu; Zhuang Chenyi
Team sabre	South Korea; Choi Soo-yeon; Kim Jeong-mi; Kim Ji-yeon; Yoon Ji-su	Japan; Misaki Emura; Shihomi Fukushima; Kanae Kobayashi; Seri Ozaki	Kazakhstan; Karina Dospay; Anastassiya Gulik; Tatyana Prikhodko; Aigerim Sarybay

== Medal table ==
Rank	Nation	Gold	Silver	Bronze	Total
1	South Korea	6	3	3	12
2	Japan	3	4	5	12
3	Hong Kong	2	1	4	7
4	China	1	3	7	11
5	Uzbekistan	0	1	0	1
6	Kazakhstan	0	0	2	2
7	Chinese Taipei	0	0	1	1
7	Iran	0	0	1	1
7	Singapore	0	0	1	1
Totals (9 entries)		12	12	24	48

== Results ==
=== Men ===
==== Individual épée ====
Quarterfinals		Semifinals		Final
Roman Aleksandrov (UZB)	6
Park Sang-young (KOR)	15	Park Sang-young (KOR)	13
Akira Komata (JPN)	15	Akira Komata (JPN)	14
Elmir Alimzhanov (KAZ)	8			Akira Komata (JPN)	10
Vadim Sharlaimov (KAZ)	9			Koki Kano (JPN)	15
Koki Kano (JPN)	15	Koki Kano (JPN)	15
Kim Myeong-ki (KOR)	13	Lan Minghao (CHN)	11
Lan Minghao (CHN)	15

==== Team épée ====
Quarterfinals
Japan	45
Australia	30
Uzbekistan	42
Kazakhstan	40
China	45
Hong Kong	43
Kyrgyzstan	37
South Korea	45

Semifinals
Japan	35
Uzbekistan	36
China	25
South Korea	29

Final
Uzbekistan	35
South Korea	38
3rd place
Japan	42
China	37

==== Individual foil ====
Quarterfinals		Semifinals		Final
Cheung Ka Long (HKG)	15
Xu Jie (CHN)	8	Cheung Ka Long (HKG)	15
Kyosuke Matsuyama (JPN)	14	Wu Bin (CHN)	13
Wu Bin (CHN)	15			Cheung Ka Long (HKG)	15
Takahiro Shikine (JPN)	11			Mo Ziwei (CHN)	6
Mo Ziwei (CHN)	15	Mo Ziwei (CHN)	15
Samuel Robson (SGP)	2	Ryan Choi (HKG)	14
Ryan Choi (HKG)	15

==== Team foil ====
Quarterfinals
Japan	45
Kuwait	15
Chinese Taipei	45
China	40
South Korea	45
Singapore	24
Australia	35
Hong Kong	45

Semifinals
Japan	45
Chinese Taipei	26
South Korea	45
Hong Kong	42

Final
Japan	45
South Korea	33
3rd place
Chinese Taipei	30
Hong Kong	45

==== Individual sabre ====
Quarterfinals		Semifinals		Final
Kim Jung-hwan (KOR)	15
Nima Zahedi (IRI)	12	Kim Jung-hwan (KOR)	15
Oh Sang-uk (KOR)	15	Oh Sang-uk (KOR)	11
Kaito Streets (JPN)	7			Kim Jung-hwan (KOR)	11
Artyom Sarkissyan (KAZ)	15			Gu Bon-gil (KOR)	15
Mao Kokubo (JPN)	14	Artyom Sarkissyan (KAZ)	10
Gu Bon-gil (KOR)	15	Gu Bon-gil (KOR)	15
Mohammad Fotouhi (IRI)	9

==== Team sabre ====
Quarterfinals
South Korea	45
Kuwait	31
Kazakhstan	39
Hong Kong	45
Japan	45
China	42
Thailand	14
Iran	45

Semifinals
South Korea	45
Hong Kong	31
Japan	45
Iran	44

Final
South Korea	45
Japan	33
3rd place
Hong Kong	33
Iran	45

=== Women ===
==== Individual épée ====
Quarterfinals		Semifinals		Final
Song Se-ra (KOR)	8
Chan Wai Ling (HKG)	9	Chan Wai Ling (HKG)	7
Vivian Kong (HKG)	15	Vivian Kong (HKG)	15
Kang Young-mi (KOR)	11			Vivian Kong (HKG)	12
Nozomi Sato (JPN)	15			Choi In-jeong (KOR)	11
Miho Yoshimura (JPN)	10	Nozomi Sato (JPN)	11
Sofiya Nikolaichuk (KAZ)	12	Choi In-jeong (KOR)	12
Choi In-jeong (KOR)	15

==== Team épée ====
Quarterfinals
South Korea	45
Thailand	24
India	29
Japan	45
Hong Kong	45
Singapore	33
Chinese Taipei	27
China	45

Semifinals
South Korea	45
Japan	35
Hong Kong	40
China	30

Final
South Korea	39
Hong Kong	27
3rd place
Japan	45
China	38

==== Individual foil ====
Quarterfinals		Semifinals		Final
Shi Yue (CHN)	15
Valerie Cheng (HKG)	9	Shi Yue (CHN)	15
Yuka Ueno (JPN)	15	Yuka Ueno (JPN)	11
Amita Berthier (SGP)	7			Shi Yue (CHN)	15
Sera Azuma (JPN)	15			Chen Qingyuan (CHN)	9
Yuzuha Takeyama (JPN)	12	Sera Azuma (JPN)	11
Cai Yuanting (CHN)	10	Chen Qingyuan (CHN)	15
Chen Qingyuan (CHN)	12

==== Team foil ====
Quarterfinals
Japan	45
Philippines	21
Singapore	45
Hong Kong	31
China	45
Chinese Taipei	23
Australia	18
South Korea	45

Semifinals
Japan	45
Singapore	31
China	43
South Korea	29

Final
Japan	45
China	33
3rd place
Singapore	35
South Korea	44

==== Individual sabre ====
Quarterfinals		Semifinals		Final
Misaki Emura (JPN)	15
Lin Kesi (CHN)	7	Misaki Emura (JPN)	15
Yoon Ji-su (KOR)	11	Fu Ying (CHN)	10
Fu Ying (CHN)	15			Misaki Emura (JPN)	9
Choi Soo-yeon (KOR)	15			Choi Soo-yeon (KOR)	15
Chu Wing Kiu (HKG)	8	Choi Soo-yeon (KOR)	15
Seri Ozaki (JPN)	13	Yang Hengyu (CHN)	12
Yang Hengyu (CHN)	15

==== Team sabre ====
Quarterfinals
South Korea	45
India	31
Hong Kong	44
Kazakhstan	45
China	45
Singapore	32
Thailand	27
Japan	45

Semifinals
South Korea	45
Kazakhstan	34
China	42
Japan	45

Final
South Korea	45
Japan	39
3rd place
Kazakhstan	35
China	45
