= Fencing at the 2022 Asian Games – Men's individual sabre =

Men's individual sabre at the 2022 Asian Games
- Venue: Hangzhou Dianzi University Gymnasium
- Date: 25 September 2023
- Competitors: 26 from 13 nations

Medalists
gold medal	Oh Sang-uk	South Korea
silver medal	Gu Bon-gil	South Korea
bronze medal	Mohammad Rahbari	Iran
bronze medal	Yousef Al-Shamlan	Kuwait

The men's individual sabre competition at the 2022 Asian Games in Hangzhou was held on 25 September 2023 at the Hangzhou Dianzi University Gymnasium.

== Schedule ==
All times are China Standard Time (UTC+08:00)

Date	Time	Event
Monday, 25 September 2023	09:00	Round of pools
Monday, 25 September 2023	10:15	Table of 32
Monday, 25 September 2023	11:10	Table of 16
Monday, 25 September 2023	12:05	Quarterfinals
Monday, 25 September 2023	18:00	Semifinals
Monday, 25 September 2023	19:50	Gold medal bout

== Results ==
=== Round of pools ===
==== Pool 1 ====
Athlete	IRI	KAZ	HKG	UZB	KSA	NEP
Ali Pakdaman (IRI)	—	5–2	5–3	5–4	2–5	5–1
Artyom Sarkissyan (KAZ)	2–5	—	2–5	5–4	5–3	5–0
Low Ho Tin (HKG)	3–5	5–2	—	5–3	5–1	5–0
Sherzod Mamutov (UZB)	4–5	4–5	3–5	—	5–2	5–1
Adel Al-Mutairi (KSA)	5–2	3–5	1–5	2–5	—	5–1
Payas Yonjan (NEP)	1–5	0–5	0–5	1–5	1–5	—

==== Pool 2 ====
Athlete	KOR	IRI	UZB	THA	VIE	JOR	KSA
Gu Bon-gil (KOR)	—	5–0	5–3	5–1	5–1	5–2	5–4
Mohammad Rahbari (IRI)	0–5	—	5–4	5–2	5–4	5–1	5–2
Musa Aymuratov (UZB)	3–5	4–5	—	5–3	5–0	5–3	5–4
Voragun Srinualnad (THA)	1–5	2–5	3–5	—	1–5	5–3	5–4
Vũ Thành An (VIE)	1–5	4–5	0–5	5–1	—	5–3	3–5
Abdallah Tahla (JOR)	2–5	1–5	3–5	3–5	3–5	—	5–4
Mohammed Al-Amr (KSA)	4–5	2–5	4–5	4–5	5–3	4–5	—

==== Pool 3 ====
Athlete	KOR	HKG	JPN	CHN	VIE	KUW	NEP
Oh Sang-uk (KOR)	—	5–0	5–4	5–2	5–0	5–2	5–0
Aaron Ho (HKG)	0–5	—	1–5	3–5	5–2	5–0	5–0
Kaito Streets (JPN)	4–5	5–1	—	3–5	5–2	5–1	5–0
Yan Yinghui (CHN)	2–5	5–3	5–3	—	5–2	5–1	5–0
Nguyễn Văn Quyết (VIE)	0–5	2–5	2–5	2–5	—	1–5	5–2
Mohammad Abdulkareem (KUW)	2–5	0–5	1–5	1–5	5–1	—	5–2
Rajendra Gajurel (NEP)	0–5	0–5	0–5	0–5	2–5	2–5	—

==== Pool 4 ====
Athlete	JPN	KUW	CHN	KAZ	JOR	THA
Kento Yoshida (JPN)	—	4–5	5–4	1–5	5–2	5–3
Yousef Al-Shamlan (KUW)	5–4	—	5–1	5–2	5–2	5–2
Shen Chenpeng (CHN)	4–5	1–5	—	5–4	5–1	5–2
Nazarbay Sattarkhan (KAZ)	5–1	2–5	4–5	—	2–5	5–1
Osama Al-Masri (JOR)	2–5	2–5	1–5	5–2	—	5–2
Panachai Wiriyatangsakul (THA)	3–5	2–5	2–5	1–5	2–5	—

==== Summary ====
Rank	Pool	Athlete	W	L	W/M	TD	TF
1	3	Oh Sang-uk (KOR)	6	0	1.000	+22	30
2	2	Gu Bon-gil (KOR)	6	0	1.000	+19	30
3	4	Yousef Al-Shamlan (KUW)	5	0	1.000	+14	25
4	3	Yan Yinghui (CHN)	5	1	0.833	+13	27
5	2	Mohammad Rahbari (IRI)	5	1	0.833	+7	25
6	1	Low Ho Tin (HKG)	4	1	0.800	+12	23
7	1	Ali Pakdaman (IRI)	4	1	0.800	+7	22
8	3	Kaito Streets (JPN)	4	2	0.667	+13	27
9	2	Musa Aymuratov (UZB)	4	2	0.667	+7	27
10	4	Shen Chenpeng (CHN)	3	2	0.600	+3	20
11	1	Artyom Sarkissyan (KAZ)	3	2	0.600	+2	19
12	4	Kento Yoshida (JPN)	3	2	0.600	+1	20
13	3	Aaron Ho (HKG)	3	3	0.500	+2	19
14	1	Sherzod Mamutov (UZB)	2	3	0.400	+3	21
15	4	Nazarbay Sattarkhan (KAZ)	2	3	0.400	+1	18
16	1	Adel Al-Mutairi (KSA)	2	3	0.400	–2	16
17	4	Osama Al-Masri (JOR)	2	3	0.400	–4	15
18	2	Vũ Thành An (VIE)	2	4	0.333	–6	18
19	3	Mohammad Abdulkareem (KUW)	2	4	0.333	−9	14
20	2	Voragun Srinualnad (THA)	2	4	0.333	−10	17
21	2	Mohammed Al-Amr (KSA)	1	5	0.167	−5	23
22	2	Abdallah Tahla (JOR)	1	5	0.167	−12	17
23	3	Nguyễn Văn Quyết (VIE)	1	5	0.167	−15	12
24	4	Panachai Wiriyatangsakul (THA)	0	5	0.000	−15	10
25	1	Payas Yonjan (NEP)	0	5	0.000	−22	3
26	3	Rajendra Gajurel (NEP)	0	6	0.000	−26	4

=== Knockout round ===
==== Final ====
Gold medal bout
1	Oh Sang-uk (KOR)	15
2	Gu Bon-gil (KOR)	7

==== Top half ====
Table of 32
17	Osama Al-Masri (JOR)	12
16	Adel Al-Mutairi (KSA)	15
21	Mohammed Al-Amr (KSA)	8
12	Kento Yoshida (JPN)	15
13	Aaron Ho (HKG)	15
20	Voragun Srinualnad (THA)	9

Table of 16
1	Oh Sang-uk (KOR)	15
16	Adel Al-Mutairi (KSA)	6
9	Musa Aymuratov (UZB)	15
8	Kaito Streets (JPN)	13
5	Mohammad Rahbari (IRI)	15
12	Kento Yoshida (JPN)	9
13	Aaron Ho (HKG)	12
4	Yan Yinghui (CHN)	15

Quarterfinals
1	Oh Sang-uk (KOR)	15
9	Musa Aymuratov (UZB)	11
5	Mohammad Rahbari (IRI)	15
4	Yan Yinghui (CHN)	12

Semifinals
1	Oh Sang-uk (KOR)	15
5	Mohammad Rahbari (IRI)	11

==== Bottom half ====
Table of 32
19	Mohammad Abdulkareem (KUW)	15
14	Sherzod Mamutov (UZB)	10
15	Nazarbay Sattarkhan (KAZ)	15
18	Vũ Thành An (VIE)	5

Table of 16
3	Yousef Al-Shamlan (KUW)	15
19	Mohammad Abdulkareem (KUW)	11
11	Artyom Sarkissyan (KAZ)	15
6	Low Ho Tin (HKG)	13
7	Ali Pakdaman (IRI)	8
10	Shen Chenpeng (CHN)	15
15	Nazarbay Sattarkhan (KAZ)	6
2	Gu Bon-gil (KOR)	15

Quarterfinals
3	Yousef Al-Shamlan (KUW)	15
11	Artyom Sarkissyan (KAZ)	10
10	Shen Chenpeng (CHN)	14
2	Gu Bon-gil (KOR)	15

Semifinals
3	Yousef Al-Shamlan (KUW)	10
2	Gu Bon-gil (KOR)	15

== Final standing ==
Rank	Athlete
1st place, gold medalist(s)	Oh Sang-uk (KOR)
2nd place, silver medalist(s)	Gu Bon-gil (KOR)
3rd place, bronze medalist(s)	Mohammad Rahbari (IRI)
3rd place, bronze medalist(s)	Yousef Al-Shamlan (KUW)
5	Yan Yinghui (CHN)
6	Musa Aymuratov (UZB)
7	Shen Chenpeng (CHN)
8	Artyom Sarkissyan (KAZ)
9	Low Ho Tin (HKG)
10	Ali Pakdaman (IRI)
11	Kaito Streets (JPN)
12	Kento Yoshida (JPN)
13	Aaron Ho (HKG)
14	Nazarbay Sattarkhan (KAZ)
15	Adel Al-Mutairi (KSA)
16	Mohammad Abdulkareem (KUW)
17	Sherzod Mamutov (UZB)
18	Osama Al-Masri (JOR)
19	Vũ Thành An (VIE)
20	Voragun Srinualnad (THA)
21	Mohammed Al-Amr (KSA)
22	Abdallah Tahla (JOR)
23	Nguyễn Văn Quyết (VIE)
24	Panachai Wiriyatangsakul (THA)
25	Payas Yonjan (NEP)
26	Rajendra Gajurel (NEP)
