= Fencing at the 2018 Asian Games – Men's individual sabre =

Men's individual sabre at the 2018 Asian Games
- Venue: Jakarta Convention Center
- Date: 20 August 2018
- Competitors: 22 from 12 nations

Medalists
gold medal	Gu Bon-gil	South Korea
silver medal	Oh Sang-uk	South Korea
bronze medal	Low Ho Tin	Hong Kong
bronze medal	Ali Pakdaman	Iran

The men's individual sabre competition at the 2018 Asian Games in Jakarta was held on 20 August at the Jakarta Convention Center.

== Schedule ==
All times are Western Indonesia Time (UTC+07:00)

Date	Time	Event
Monday, 20 August 2018	11:00	Preliminaries
Monday, 20 August 2018	12:45	Round of 32
Monday, 20 August 2018	14:05	Round of 16
Monday, 20 August 2018	15:15	Quarterfinals
Monday, 20 August 2018	19:00	Semifinals
Monday, 20 August 2018	20:10	Gold medal match

== Results ==
=== Preliminaries ===
==== Pool A ====
Athlete	KOR	JPN	KAZ	UAE	THA
Gu Bon-gil (KOR)	—	5–0	5–1	5–0	5–1
Kenta Tokunan (JPN)	0–5	—	5–2	5–0	5–4
Nurzhan Karim (KAZ)	1–5	2–5	—	5–1	3–5
Ali Al-Hammadi (UAE)	0–5	0–5	1–5	—	1–5
Soravit Kitsiriboon (THA)	1–5	4–5	5–3	5–1	—

==== Pool B ====
Athlete	KOR	CHN	KAZ	THA	INA
Oh Sang-uk (KOR)	—	5–2	5–0	5–2	5–2
Wang Shi (CHN)	2–5	—	5–3	5–2	5–1
Ilya Mokretsov (KAZ)	0–5	3–5	—	5–2	5–0
Voragun Srinualnad (THA)	2–5	2–5	2–5	—	5–4
Hendri Eko Budianto (INA)	2–5	1–5	0–5	4–5	—

==== Pool C ====
Athlete	IRI	JPN	VIE	HKG	INA	QAT
Ali Pakdaman (IRI)	—	5–2	5–4	5–2	5–3	5–0
Kento Yoshida (JPN)	2–5	—	4–5	5–0	4–5	5–1
Nguyễn Xuân Lợi (VIE)	4–5	5–4	—	1–5	5–4	5–2
Lam Hin Chung (HKG)	2–5	0–5	5–1	—	3–5	5–1
Indra Agus Setiawan (INA)	3–5	5–4	4–5	5–3	—	5–4
Ahmad Salmanpour (QAT)	0–5	1–5	2–5	1–5	4–5	—

==== Pool D ====
Athlete	IRI	CHN	VIE	HKG	QAT	MAS
Mojtaba Abedini (IRI)	—	1–5	5–2	4–5	5–0	5–4
Xu Yingming (CHN)	5–1	—	1–5	2–5	5–1	5–0
Vũ Thành An (VIE)	2–5	5–1	—	4–5	5–0	5–2
Low Ho Tin (HKG)	5–4	5–2	5–4	—	5–3	5–1
Nasr Al-Saadi (QAT)	0–5	1–5	0–5	3–5	—	5–4
Syed Adam Emir Putra (MAS)	4–5	0–5	2–5	1–5	4–5	—

==== Summary ====
Rank	Pool	Athlete	W	L	W/M	TD	TF
1	A	Gu Bon-gil (KOR)	4	0	1.000	+18	20
2	C	Ali Pakdaman (IRI)	5	0	1.000	+14	25
3	B	Oh Sang-uk (KOR)	4	0	1.000	+14	20
4	D	Low Ho Tin (HKG)	5	0	1.000	+11	25
5	B	Wang Shi (CHN)	3	1	0.750	+6	17
6	A	Kenta Tokunan (JPN)	3	1	0.750	+4	15
7	D	Vũ Thành An (VIE)	3	2	0.600	+8	21
8	D	Xu Yingming (CHN)	3	2	0.600	+6	18
9	D	Mojtaba Abedini (IRI)	3	2	0.600	+4	20
10	C	Indra Agus Setiawan (INA)	3	2	0.600	+1	22
11	C	Nguyễn Xuân Lợi (VIE)	3	2	0.600	0	20
12	A	Soravit Kitsiriboon (THA)	2	2	0.500	+1	15
13	B	Ilya Mokretsov (KAZ)	2	2	0.500	+1	13
14	C	Kento Yoshida (JPN)	2	3	0.400	+4	20
15	C	Lam Hin Chung (HKG)	2	3	0.400	−2	15
16	A	Nurzhan Karim (KAZ)	1	3	0.250	−5	11
17	B	Voragun Srinualnad (THA)	1	3	0.250	−8	11
18	D	Nasr Al-Saadi (QAT)	1	4	0.200	−15	9
19	B	Hendri Eko Budianto (INA)	0	4	0.000	−13	7
20	D	Syed Adam Emir Putra (MAS)	0	5	0.000	−14	11
21	C	Ahmad Salmanpour (QAT)	0	5	0.000	−17	8
22	A	Ali Al-Hammadi (UAE)	0	4	0.000	−18	2

=== Knockout round ===
==== Final ====
Gold medal match
1	Gu Bon-gil (KOR)	15
3	Oh Sang-uk (KOR)	14

==== Top half ====
Round of 32
17	Voragun Srinualnad (THA)	13
16	Nurzhan Karim (KAZ)	15

Round of 16
1	Gu Bon-gil (KOR)	15
16	Nurzhan Karim (KAZ)	4
9	Mojtaba Abedini (IRI)	15
8	Xu Yingming (CHN)	6
5	Wang Shi (CHN)	15
12	Soravit Kitsiriboon (THA)	7
13	Ilya Mokretsov (KAZ)	8
4	Low Ho Tin (HKG)	15

Quarterfinals
1	Gu Bon-gil (KOR)	15
9	Mojtaba Abedini (IRI)	12
5	Wang Shi (CHN)	9
4	Low Ho Tin (HKG)	15

Semifinals
1	Gu Bon-gil (KOR)	15
4	Low Ho Tin (HKG)	4

==== Bottom half ====
Round of 32

Round of 16
3	Oh Sang-uk (KOR)	15
14	Kento Yoshida (JPN)	7
11	Nguyễn Xuân Lợi (VIE)	9
6	Kenta Tokunan (JPN)	15
7	Vũ Thành An (VIE)	15
10	Indra Agus Setiawan (INA)	9
15	Lam Hin Chung (HKG)	10
2	Ali Pakdaman (IRI)	15

Quarterfinals
3	Oh Sang-uk (KOR)	15
6	Kenta Tokunan (JPN)	4
7	Vũ Thành An (VIE)	11
2	Ali Pakdaman (IRI)	15

Semifinals
3	Oh Sang-uk (KOR)	15
2	Ali Pakdaman (IRI)	14

== Final standing ==
Rank	Athlete
1st place, gold medalist(s)	Gu Bon-gil (KOR)
2nd place, silver medalist(s)	Oh Sang-uk (KOR)
3rd place, bronze medalist(s)	Low Ho Tin (HKG)
3rd place, bronze medalist(s)	Ali Pakdaman (IRI)
5	Wang Shi (CHN)
6	Kenta Tokunan (JPN)
7	Vũ Thành An (VIE)
8	Mojtaba Abedini (IRI)
9	Xu Yingming (CHN)
10	Indra Agus Setiawan (INA)
11	Nguyễn Xuân Lợi (VIE)
12	Soravit Kitsiriboon (THA)
13	Ilya Mokretsov (KAZ)
14	Kento Yoshida (JPN)
15	Lam Hin Chung (HKG)
16	Nurzhan Karim (KAZ)
17	Voragun Srinualnad (THA)
18	Nasr Al-Saadi (QAT)
19	Hendri Eko Budianto (INA)
20	Syed Adam Emir Putra (MAS)
21	Ahmad Salmanpour (QAT)
22	Ali Al-Hammadi (UAE)
