= Fencing at the 2017 Summer Universiade – Men's team sabre =

Men's team sabre at the XXIX Summer Universiade
- Venues: Taipei Nangang Exhibition Center
- Dates: 23 August 2017
- Competitors: 56 from 15 nations

Medalists
1st place, gold medalist(s)		Gu Bon-gil; Kim Jun-ho; Oh Sang-uk; Jang Tea-hoon	South Korea
2nd place, silver medalist(s)		Mohammad Fotouhi; Mohammad Rahbari; Farzad Baher; Ali Pakdaman	Iran
3rd place, bronze medalist(s)		Lorenzo Romano; Riccardo Nuccio; Dario Cavaliere; Francesco D'Armiento	Italy

The men's team sabre fencing event at the 2017 Summer Universiade was held 23 August at the Taipei Nangang Exhibition Center in Taipei, Taiwan.

== Seeds ==
Since the number of individual épée event participants were 71, 72 was the added number on those who did not participate in the individual event.

Tournament Seeding	Team	Name	RI
1 (20)	Iran	Mohammad Fotouhi	3
1 (20)	Iran	Mohammad Rahbari	3
1 (20)	Iran	Farzad Baher	14
1 (20)	Iran	Ali Pakdaman	19
2 (37)	South Korea	Gu Bon-gil	5
2 (37)	South Korea	Kim Jun-ho	8
2 (37)	South Korea	Oh Sang-uk	24
2 (37)	South Korea	Jang Tea-hoon	38
3 (38)	Italy	Lorenzo Romano	9
3 (38)	Italy	Riccardo Nuccio	11
3 (38)	Italy	Dario Cavaliere	18
3 (38)	Italy	Francesco D'Armiento	34
4 (41)	Russia	Anatoliy Kostenko	6
4 (41)	Russia	Ilya Motorin	13
4 (41)	Russia	Vasiliy Shirshov	22
4 (41)	Russia	Andrey Gladkov	32
5 (44)	France	Edward Barloy	7
5 (44)	France	Jean-Philippe Patrice	12
5 (44)	France	Remi Senegas	25
5 (44)	France	Edern Annic	26
6 (50)	Hungary	András Szatmári	1
6 (50)	Hungary	Miklós Péch	20
6 (50)	Hungary	Sebestyén Puy	29
6 (50)	Hungary	Nikolász Iliász	33
7 (55)	United States	Peter Souders	16
7 (55)	United States	Karol Metryka	17
7 (55)	United States	Benjamin Natanzon	22
7 (55)	United States	Calvin Liang	46
8 (93)	Ukraine	Yuriy Tsap	15
8 (93)	Ukraine	Bogdan Platonov	36
8 (93)	Ukraine	Oleksandr Karakai	42
8 (93)	Ukraine	Oleksiy Statsenko	43
9 (105)	Japan	Kaito Streets	10
9 (105)	Japan	Yuto Watanabe	37
9 (105)	Japan	Norihiro Shimizu	58
10 (122)	Romania	George Iancu	30
10 (122)	Romania	Mădălin Bucur	45
10 (122)	Romania	Sergiu Ciornila	47
10 (122)	Romania	Mihai Crutu	48
11 (122)	Poland	Mikołaj Grzegorek	31
11 (122)	Poland	Jakub Ocinski	39
11 (122)	Poland	Jakub Jaskot	52
11 (122)	Poland	Krzysztof Kaczkowski	63
12 (162)	Indonesia	Fauzan Novriansyah	51
12 (162)	Indonesia	Richard Henry Arfee Tarega	55
12 (162)	Indonesia	Muhammad Zuhdi	56
13 (180)	India	Dharam Singh	59
13 (180)	India	Javed Ahmed Chowdhary	60
13 (180)	India	Pravin Kumar Ganware	61
13 (180)	India	Notum Walia	66
14 (183)	China	Lu Yifeng	57
14 (183)	China	Shi Zhehao	62
14 (183)	China	Wang Zicheng	64
15 (204)	Sweden	Max Korlinge	66
15 (204)	Sweden	Johan De Jong Skierus	68
15 (204)	Sweden	Alexander Wagner	70

== Ranking Round ==
Round of 16
9	Japan	45
8	Ukraine	43
5	France	45
12	Indonesia	19
13	India	15
4	Russia	45
3	Italy	45
14	China	19
11	Poland	23
6	Hungary	45
7	United States	45
10	Romania	42
15	Sweden	13
2	South Korea	45

Quarterfinals
1	Iran	45
9	Japan	20
5	France	44
4	Russia	45
3	Italy	45
6	Hungary	34
7	United States	28
2	South Korea	45

Semifinals
1	Iran	45
4	Russia	41
3	Italy	26
2	South Korea	45

Final
1	Iran	30
2	South Korea	45
Third place
4	Russia	32
3	Italy	45

== Final ranking ==
Rank	Team	Results
1st place, gold medalist(s)	South Korea	Champion
2nd place, silver medalist(s)	Iran	Runner-up
3rd place, bronze medalist(s)	Italy	Third place
4	Russia	Semifinals
5	Hungary	Quarterfinals
6	France	Quarterfinals
7	United States	Quarterfinals
8	Japan	Quarterfinals
9	Ukraine	Round of 16
10	Poland	Round of 16
11	Romania	Round of 16
12	Indonesia	Round of 16
13	India	Round of 16
14	China	Round of 16
15	Sweden	Round of 16
