= Oh Sang-uk =

South Korean fencer (born 1996)

OH Sang-uk
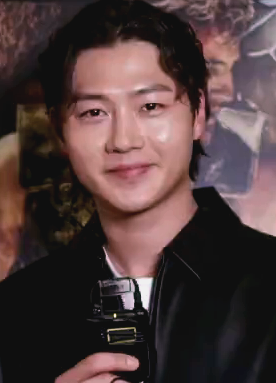
- Oh in 2024

Personal information
- Born: 30 September 1996 (age 30) Daejeon, South Korea
- Height: 1.92 m (6 ft 4 in)
- Weight: 190

Fencing career
- Sport: Fencing
- Country: South Korea
- Weapon: Sabre
- Hand: right-handed
- Club: Daejeon City
- Head coach: Kim Hyung-Yeol
- FIE ranking: current ranking
Medal record
Men's sabre
Representing South Korea
Event	1st	2nd	3rd
Olympic Games	3	0	0
World Championships	5	2	0
Asian Championships	6	0	1
Total	14	2	1
Olympic Games
Gold medal – first place	2020 Tokyo	Team
Gold medal – first place	2024 Paris	Individual
Gold medal – first place	2024 Paris	Team
World Championships
Gold medal – first place	2017 Leipzig	Team
Gold medal – first place	2018 Wuxi	Team
Gold medal – first place	2019 Budapest	Individual
Gold medal – first place	2019 Budapest	Team
Gold medal – first place	2022 Cairo	Team
Silver medal – second place	2023 Milan	Team
Silver medal – second place	2026 Hong Kong	Team
Asian Games
Gold medal – first place	2018 Jakarta	Team
Gold medal – first place	2022 Hangzhou	Team
Gold medal – first place	2022 Hangzhou	Individual
Gold medal – first place	2026 Aichi-Nagoya	Individual
Gold medal – first place	2026 Aichi-Nagoya	Team
Silver medal – second place	2018 Jakarta	Individual
Asian Championships
Gold medal – first place	2016 Wuxi	Team
Gold medal – first place	2017 Hong Kong	Team
Gold medal – first place	2019 Chiba	Individual
Gold medal – first place	2019 Chiba	Team
Gold medal – first place	2024 Kuwait City	Individual
Gold medal – first place	2024 Kuwait City	Team
Bronze medal – third place	2018 Bangkok	Team
Universiade
Gold medal – first place	2017 Taipei	Team
Gold medal – first place	2019 Naples	Individual
Gold medal – first place	2019 Naples	Team

- Oh Sang-uk
- Hangul: 오상욱
- Hanja: 吳尙旭
- RR: O Sanguk
- MR: O Sanguk

Oh Sang-uk (Korean: 오상욱; born 30 September 1996) is a South Korean right-handed sabre fencer.

Oh is a five-time team Asian champion, 2019 and 2024 individual Asian champion, three-time team world champion, and 2019 individual world champion.

A two-time Olympian, Oh is a two-time team Olympic champion in 2020 and 2024 and 2024 individual Olympic champion.

== Early life ==
OH followed his older brother into fencing and joined his middle school's fencing team. A native of Daejeon, he attended Songchon High School, known as a high school fencing powerhouse in the region, and began representing the national team in the youth categories. During his senior year, he won gold in the individual sabre event at the national high school championships and his high school team won in the team event.

== Career ==
Oh had been a stand-out in the junior and cadet categories and quickly drew attention for defeating then-ranked world number 1 and 2012 Olympic team gold medalist Gu Bon-gil in the Round of 16 of the 2015 National Championships. He was earmarked as a successor to Kim Jung-hwan, whom he idolized in high school and who was speculated to be retiring after the 2016 Olympics, due to their similar aggressive style of play and agility. While he did not make it to the final, he was ranked high enough to qualify for the senior national team, a rarity for a teenager as fencers were generally selected for the national team while in college. At that time, the men's sabre team went through a generational change with the retirements of 2012 Olympic team gold medalists Oh Eun-seok and Won Woo-young. The nineteen-year-old was added into the team with Kim Jun-ho, joining veterans Kim Jung-hwan and Gu Bon-gil for the 2016 Asian Championships. He won his first ever gold medal in a major international tournament when they won the team gold.

Due the now-abolished rotation system, there was no men's team sabre event at the 2016 Summer Olympics. Oh did not rank high enough to qualify for the individual event. He won back-to-back gold medals with the same team at the World Championships and Asian Championships, in 2017 and 2018. In the 2018 Asian Games, he reached the final of the individual event and was defeated by Gu, taking silver. However, his gold medal in the team event meant that he was exempted from mandatory military service. Kim Jung-hwan retired from the national team after the Asian Games and was replaced by Ha Han-sol.

Oh won four gold medals in 2019, winning in both the team and individual events at the World Championships and Asian Championships. Kim Jung-hwan came out of retirement and the gold medal-winning team from the 2017 and 2018 Worlds was reunited again and qualified for the 2020 Summer Olympics, which was postponed for a year. He was nearly unable to participate as he contracted COVID-19 several months prior to the Olympics and then sustained an ankle injury during pre-competition training.

Oh went into the Olympics ranked world number 1, thus earning a spot in the individual event. However, he lost to Sandro Bazadze in the quarter-finals. He won his first Olympic medal when they won gold in the team event. In the team semi-finals, he scored the last point in a narrow 45–42 win over Germany, sending the South Koreans to the final for a second consecutive time. During the final against Italy, with the score at 40–21 to South Korea, Oh nearly conceded their lead but managed to score the final five points to win 45–26, the exact same score in the final nine years prior.

== Medal record ==
=== Olympic Games ===
Year	Location	Event	Position
2021	Tokyo, Japan	Team Men's Sabre	1st
2024	Paris, France	Individual Men's Sabre	1st
2024	Paris, France	Team Men's Sabre	1st

=== World Championships ===
Year	Location	Event	Position
2017	Leipzig, Germany	Team Men's Sabre	1st
2018	Wuxi, China	Team Men's Sabre	1st
2019	Budapest, Hungary	Individual Men's Sabre	1st
2019	Budapest, Hungary	Team Men's Sabre	1st

=== Grand Prix ===
Date	Location	Event	Position
2017-12-15	Cancún, Mexico	Individual Men's Sabre	1st
2018-05-11	Moscow, Russia	Individual Men's Sabre	1st
2019-02-22	Cairo, Egypt	Individual Men's Sabre	1st
2019-04-26	Seoul, South Korea	Individual Men's Sabre	1st
2021-11-11	Orleans, France	Individual Men's Sabre	3rd
2023-04-29	Seoul, South Korea	Individual Men's Sabre	1st

=== World Cup ===
Date	Location	Event	Position
2015-01-30	Padua, Italy	Individual Men's Sabre	3rd
2016-12-02	Győr, Hungary	Individual Men's Sabre	1st
2017-02-03	Padua, Italy	Individual Men's Sabre	3rd
2017-12-01	Győr, Hungary	Individual Men's Sabre	1st
2018-05-18	Madrid, Spain	Individual Men's Sabre	3rd
2018-11-16	Algier, Algeria	Individual Men's Sabre	3rd
2019-02-01	Warsaw, Poland	Individual Men's Sabre	3rd
2019-03-22	Budapest, Hungary	Individual Men's Sabre	2nd
2019-05-10	Madrid, Spain	Individual Men's Sabre	3rd
2020-02-21	Warsaw, Poland	Individual Men's Sabre	3rd
2020-03-06	Luxembourg	Individual Men's Sabre	3rd
2020-03-08	Luxembourg	Team Men's Sabre	1st
2021-03-11	Budapest, Hungary	Individual Men's Sabre	1st
2022-03-18	Budapest, Hungary	Individual Men's Sabre	3rd
2022-05-06	Madrid, Spain	Individual Men's Sabre	1st
2022-05-08	Madrid, Spain	Team Men's Sabre	1st
2022-07-15	Cairo, Egypt	Team Men's Sabre	1st

=== Asian Championship ===
Year	Location	Event	Position
2016	Wuxi, China	Team Men's Sabre	1st
2017	Hong Kong, China	Team Men's Sabre	1st
2018	Bangkok, Thailand	Team Men's Sabre	3rd
2019	Tokyo, Japan	Individual Men's Sabre	1st
2019	Tokyo, Japan	Team Men's Sabre	1st
2022	Seoul, South Korea	Individual Men's Sabre	3rd
2022	Seoul, South Korea	Team Men's Sabre	1st
2024	Kuwait City, Kuwait	Individual Men's Sabre	1st
2024	Kuwait City, Kuwait	Team Men's Sabre	1st

== Performance timeline ==
=== National team ===
Team events	2015	2016	2017	2018	2019	2020	2021	2022	2023	2024
Olympic Games	NH						G	NH		G
World Championships	A	QF	G	G	G	NH		G	S	
Asian Games	NH			G	NH				G	
Asian Championships	A	G	G	B	G	NH		G	G	
Summer Universiade	A	NH	G	NH	G	NH				

Team Events	2015	2016	2017	2018	2019	2020	2021	2022	2023
Team Events	World Cup								
Algeria	NH		A	W	NH			W	
Egypt	NH				W	NH			
Georgia	QF	NH						W	
Hungary	QF	F	W	NH	W	NH	SF	QF	W
Italy	A	SF	W	W	W	NH			A
Luxembourg	NH					W	NH		
Poland	F	QF	SF	W	QF	F	NH		A
Senegal	NH	SF	NH						
Spain	QF	QF	A	W	SF	NH		W	R16

=== Individual ===
Team events	2015	2016	2017	2018	2019	2020	2021	2022	2023	2024
Olympic Games	NH	A	NH				QF	NH		G
World Championships	A	NH	QF	R32	G	NH		QF		
Asian Games	NH			S	NH				G	
Asian Championships	A	QF	QF	R32	G	NH		B		
Summer Universiade	A	NH	R32	NH	G	NH				

Team Events	2015	2016	2017	2018	2019	2020	2021	2022	2023
Team Events	Grand Prix								
Canada	NH					QF	NH		
Egypt	NH				W	NH			
France	NH						SF	A	
Italy	NH							R16	
Mexico	NH	R64	W	NH					
Russia	R32	R32	QF	W	R32	NH			
South Korea	R64	R32	QF	R16	W	NH			W
Tunisia	NH								A
United States	R64	NH							
	World Cup								
Algeria	NH		A	SF	NH			R64	
Egypt	NH				R32	NH			
Georgia	R16	NH						QF	
Hungary	R16	W	W	NH	F	NH	W	SF	R64
Italy	SF	QF	SF	QF	R16	NH			A
Luxembourg	NH					SF	NH		
Poland	R64	R16	R32	R16	SF	SF	NH		A
Senegal	NH	R16	NH						
Spain	R64	QF	A	SF	SF	NH		W	R16

== Personal life ==
Oh attended Daejeon University, known for its fencing team, on a scholarship and graduated in 2019.

== Filmography ==
=== Television shows ===
Year	Title	Role	Notes	Ref.
2021	Racket Boys	Club members	Episode 1–12	
