= Andrew Mackiewicz =

American fencer

Personal information
- Nationality: United States
- Born: December 12, 1995 (age 30)

Sport
- Sport: Fencing
- Event: saber
- College team: Penn State Nittany Lions
Medal record
Men's sabre
Representing the United States
Junior World Championships
Bronze medal – third place	2015 Tashkent	Team

Andrew Mackiewicz (born December 12, 1995) is an American saber fencer. He competed in the 2020 Tokyo Olympic Games.

== Biography ==
Mackiewicz lived in Westwood, Massachusetts, and later moved to New York City. His parents were immigrants. He trained at eight years of age at Zeta Fencing Club in Massachusetts, under head coach Zoran Tulum.

Mackiewicz won an individual silver medal at the 2012 Cadet World Fencing Championships. a team bronze medal at the 2014 Junior World Fencing Championships, an individual silver medal and team gold medal at the 2016 Pan American Fencing Championships, and an individual bronze medal at the 2018 Pan American Fencing Championships.

He attended Penn State ('18), where he majored in marketing. Fencing for the Penn State Nittany Lions, as a freshman and then as a sophomore Mackiewicz was the 2015 and then the 2016 NCAA Men's Sabre Champion.

Mackiewicz competed for the United States at the 2020 Tokyo Olympic Games in 2021, and came in 8th in team sabre and 31st in individual sabre.

He won a bronze medal at the 2022 Pan American Championships, and a team bronze medal at the 2023 Sabre de Wołodyjowski.

== See also ==
- List of NCAA fencing champions
- List of Pennsylvania State University Olympians
