= Dmitriy Danilenko =

Russian fencer (born 1995)

Personal information
- Nationality: Russian
- Born: 29 May 1995 (age 31) Moscow, Russia

Fencing career
- Sport: Fencing
- National coach: Christian Bauer
- Club: Dynamo-MGFSO Olympus Moscow
- Head coach: Alexander Filatov
Medal record
Men's sabre
Representing Individual Neutral Athletes
European Championships
Bronze medal – third place	2025 Genoa	Team
Representing Russia
World Championships
Gold medal – first place	2016 Rio de Janeiro	Team
European Championships
Gold medal – first place	2016 Toruń	Team
Gold medal – first place	2017 Tbilisi	Team
Bronze medal – third place	2018 Novi Sad	Individual
Junior World Championships
Silver medal – second place	2015 Tashkent	Team
Summer Universiade
Silver medal – second place	2015 Gwangju	Individual

Dmitriy Ivanovich Danilenko (Russian: Дмитрий Иванович Даниленко; born 29 May 1995) is a Russian fencer. He competed in the men's team sabre event at the 2020 Summer Olympics.
