= Matyas Szabo =

German fencer

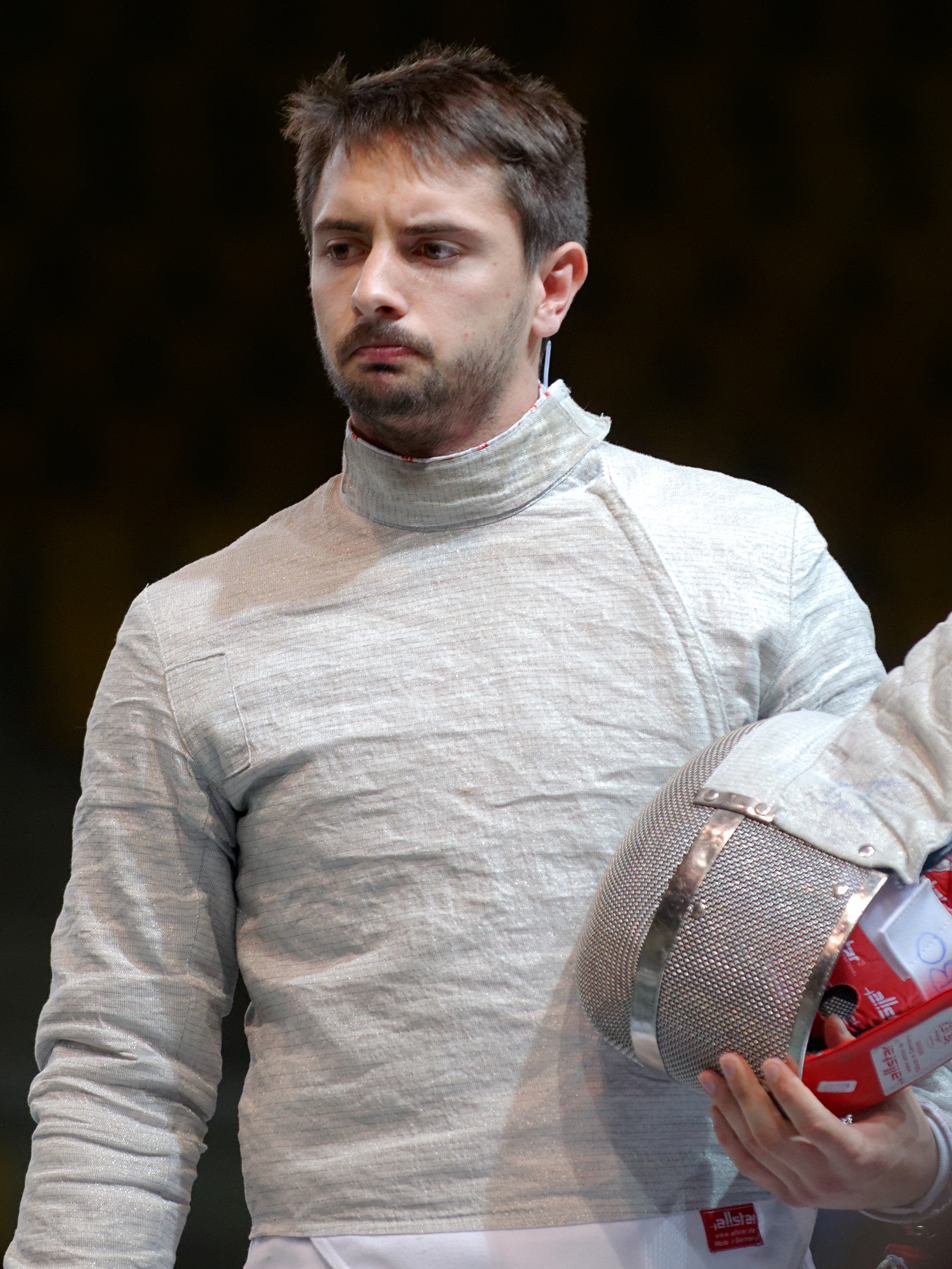
- Szabo at the 2014 European Championships

Personal information
- Born: 19 August 1991 (age 34)
- Home town: Dormagen, North Rhine-Westphalia, Germany
- Height: 183 cm (6 ft 0 in)
- Weight: 82 kg (181 lb)

Fencing career
- Sport: Fencing
- Country: Germany
- Weapon: Sabre
- Hand: Right-handed
- National coach: Vilmoș Szabo
- Club: TSV Bayer Dormagen
- Head coach: Vilmoș Szabo
- FIE ranking: current ranking
Medal record
Men's sabre
Representing Germany
World Championships
Gold medal – first place	2014 Kazan	Team
Bronze medal – third place	2015 Moscow	Team
European Games
Bronze medal – third place	2023 Kraków–Małopolska	Team
European Championships
Gold medal – first place	2015 Montreux	Team
Gold medal – first place	2019 Düsseldorf	Team
Bronze medal – third place	2012 Legnano	Team
Bronze medal – third place	2014 Strasbourg	Team
Bronze medal – third place	2018 Novi Sad	Team
Bronze medal – third place	2023 Kraków	Team

Matyas Szabo (Hungarian: Szabó Mátyás; born 19 August 1991) is a Romanian-born Hungarian-German fencer, team World champion in 2014.

== Career ==
Szabo is the eldest son of Vilmos Szabó, bronze medallist at the 1984 Summer Olympics in men's team sabre, and Réka Zsófia Lázár, bronze medallist at the 1992 Summer Olympics and silver medallist at the 1996 Summer Olympics in women's team foil, both from Brașov and members of the Hungarian minority in Romania. When he was two years old, his parents moved to Germany and became fencing coaches at TSV Bayer Dormagen.

Szabo began fencing at the age of four because his parents' occupation had him practically live on the piste. He chose sabre, his father's weapon, because the only foilists at TSV Dormagen were girls. He first competed for Romania, under whose colours he won the silver medal at the 2008 Cadets European Championship in Rovigo after being defeated in the final by Hungary's Nikolász Iliász.

When he came of age in 2009, Szabo decided to become a German citizen—he speaks German, Hungarian, and English, but not Romanian. After his Abitur he was admitted into the sports section of the Bundeswehr and joined the German national team, coached by his father. Under the German flag, Szabo won the team gold medal at the 2010 Junior European Championships in Lobnya and at the 2010 Junior World Championships in Baku. A year later he became Junior World champion both in the individual and team events at the Dead Sea. For this performance, he was named 2011 Junior Athlete of the Year by Deutsche Sporthilfe.

Szabo first competed with the senior national team at the 2012 European Fencing Championships in Legnano. Germany was defeated by Romania in the semi-final, then prevailed over Italy to take the bronze medal. Szabo climbed his first World Cup podium in the 2012–13 season with a victory in the Challenge Chicago after overcoming in the final Olympic champion Áron Szilágyi. At the 2013 European Championships, he was beaten in the second round by France's Vincent Anstett. In the team event, Germany lost against Hungary in the first round and was ranked 5th. For his first participation in World Championships, Szabo was defeated in the second round by Italy's Luigi Samele. In the team event, Germany was edged out by Russia in the quarter-finals and ended up 5th. Szabo finished the season 17th in world rankings.

In the 2012–13 season Szabo took a bronze medal in the Moscow World Cup. He ceded in the second round of the European Championships in Strasbourg against Hungary's András Szatmári. In the team event, Germany was defeated by a single hit by Italy in the semi-finals. They overcame Belarus in the small final to take the bronze medal. In the World Championships in Kazan, Szabo was stopped again in the table of 32, this time by Romania's Tiberiu Dolniceanu. In the team event, No.4 seed Germany cruised past China and the United States. They overcame Russia 40–45 to meet Olympic champions South Korea in the final. Max Hartung, Nicolas Limbach, Benedikt Wagner and Szabo prevailed 45–41 and won the World title in men's sabre for the first time in history.
