= Mohammad Rahbari =

Iranian fencer (born 1991)

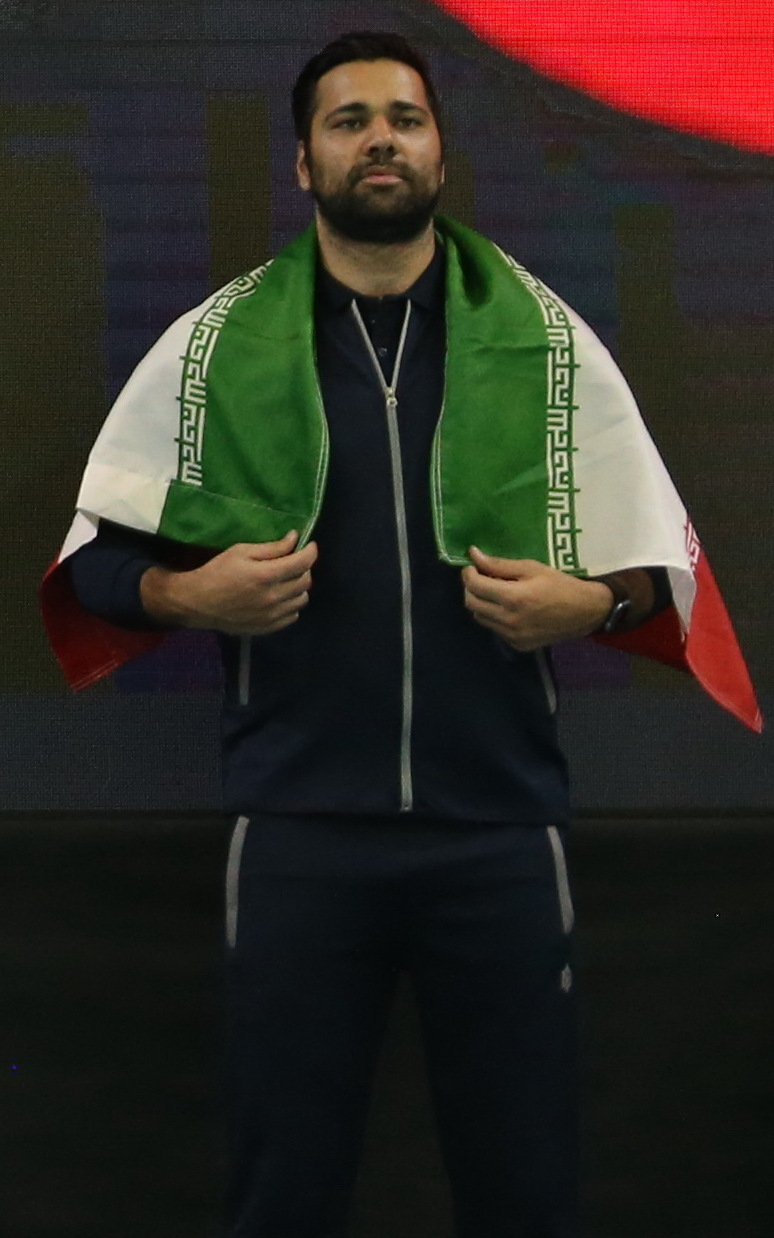

Personal information
- Born: 13 December 1991 (age 34) Rasht, Iran

Fencing career
- Sport: Fencing
- Weapon: Sabre
- Hand: right-handed
Medal record
Men's sabre fencing
Representing Iran
Asian Games
Silver medal – second place	2014 Incheon	Team
Silver medal – second place	2018 Jakarta–Palembang	Team
Bronze medal – third place	2022 Hangzhou	Individual
Bronze medal – third place	2022 Hangzhou	Team
Asian Championships
Silver medal – second place	2013 Shanghai	Team
Silver medal – second place	2015 Singapore	Team
Silver medal – second place	2017 Hong Kong	Individual
Silver medal – second place	2017 Hong Kong	Team
Silver medal – second place	2019 Chiba	Team
Silver medal – second place	2024 Kuwait City	Team
Bronze medal – third place	2014 Suwon	Team
Bronze medal – third place	2022 Seoul	Team
Bronze medal – third place	2023 Wuxi	Individual
Bronze medal – third place	2023 Wuxi	Team
Bronze medal – third place	2024 Kuwait City	Individual
Universiade
Silver medal – second place	2017 Taipei	Team sabre
Bronze medal – third place	2017 Taipei	Individual sabre
Islamic Solidarity Games
Gold medal – first place	2021 Konya	Team
Bronze medal – third place	2021 Konya	Individual

Mohammad Rahbari (Persian: محمد رهبری; born 13 December 1991) is an Iranian fencer. He competed in the men's sabre and Men's team sabre events at the 2020 Summer Olympics in Tokyo 2021.
