= Luca Curatoli =

Italian fencer (born 1994)

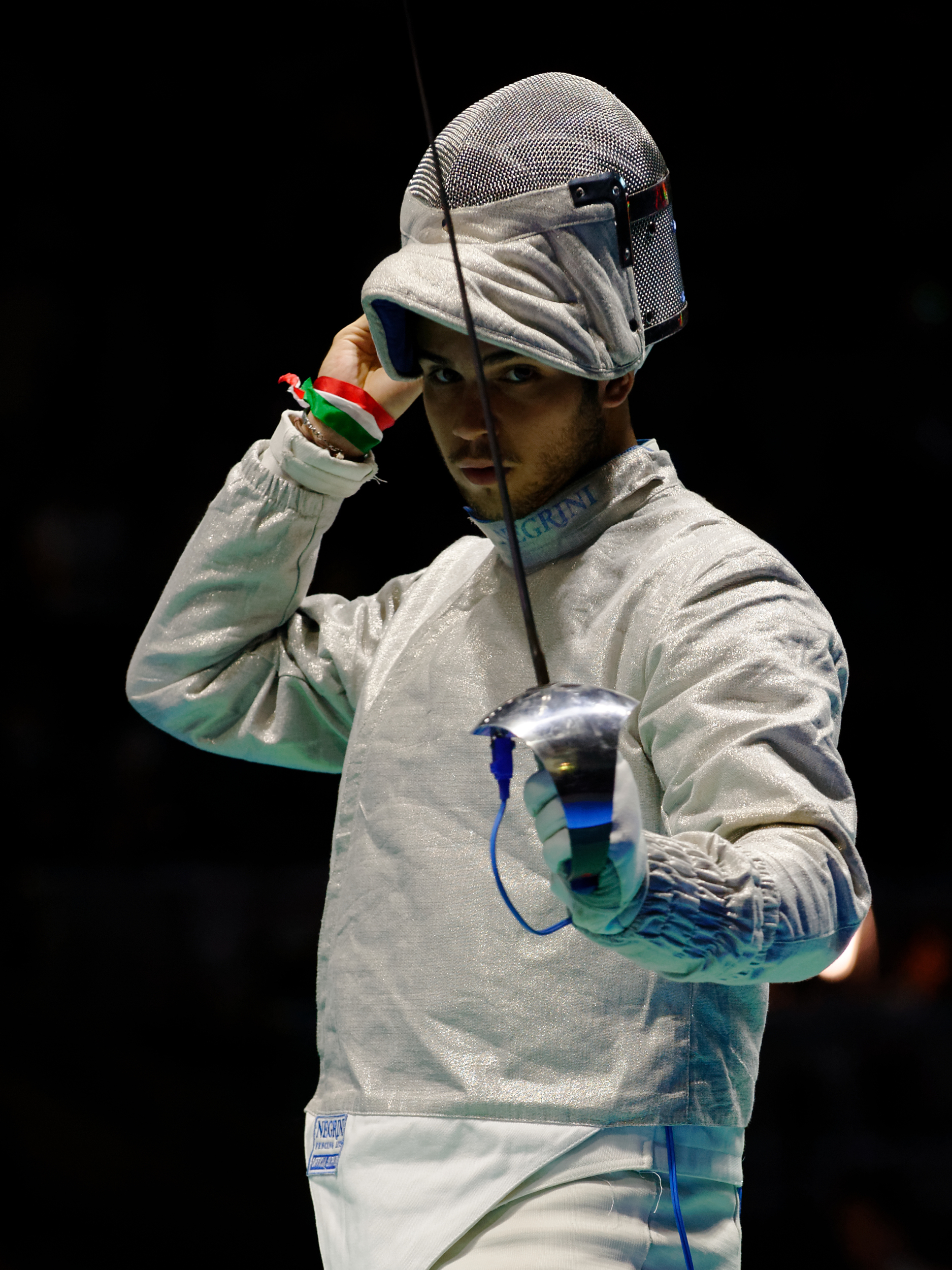
- Curatoli in 2015

Personal information
- Born: 25 July 1994 (age 32) Naples, Italy

Fencing career
- Sport: Fencing
- Country: Italy
- Weapon: Sabre
- Hand: left-handed
- National coach: Giovanni Sirovich
- Club: Fiamme Oro; Circolo Posillipo
- Head coach: Leonardo Caserta
- FIE ranking: current ranking
Medal record
Men's sabre
Representing Italy
Olympic Games
Silver medal – second place	2020 Tokyo	Team
World Championships
Gold medal – first place	2015 Moscow	Team
Gold medal – first place	2025 Tbilisi	Team
Silver medal – second place	2018 Wuxi	Team
Bronze medal – third place	2017 Leipzig	Team
Bronze medal – third place	2019 Budapest	Individual
Bronze medal – third place	2019 Budapest	Team
Bronze medal – third place	2022 Cairo	Team
Bronze medal – third place	2025 Tbilisi	Individual
European Games
Silver medal – second place	2023 Kraków–Małopolska	Team
European Championships
Silver medal – second place	2015 Montreux	Team
Silver medal – second place	2016 Toruń	Team
Silver medal – second place	2017 Tbilisi	Team
Silver medal – second place	2018 Novi Sad	Team
Silver medal – second place	2022 Antalya	Individual
Silver medal – second place	2023 Kraków	Team
Silver medal – second place	2024 Basel	Individual
Silver medal – second place	2025 Genoa	Team
Bronze medal – third place	2017 Tbilisi	Individual
Bronze medal – third place	2019 Düsseldorf	Team

Luca Curatoli (born 25 July 1994) is an Italian left-handed sabre fencer, 2015 team world champion, and 2021 team Olympic silver medalist.

== Career ==
Curatoli is the half-brother of 1995 sabre world champion Raffaello Caserta and of Leonardo Caserta, who coaches him at Circolo Posillipo. In 2014 he won the gold medal at the Junior European Championships in Jerusalem and took a double gold haul at the Junior World Championships in Plovdiv.

In the 2014-15 season he climbed his first World Cup podium with a bronze medal in Warsaw. These results had him selected into the Italian senior national team, with whom he was silver medallist at the 2015 European Championships. At the 2015 World Fencing Championships, his first participation in this type of event, he achieved the best Italian performance in men's sabre by reaching the table of 16, where he was defeated by reigning Olympic champion Áron Szilágyi. In the team event, Italy prevailed successively over the Czech Republic, Mexico, Romania and France to reach the final, where they met host Russia. Curatoli was chosen to open the match against Nikolay Kovalev and hold his stead in his following relays, helping his team to win the gold medal.

== Medal record ==
=== Olympic Games ===
Year	Location	Event	Position
2021	Tokyo, Japan	Team Men's Sabre	2nd

=== World Championship ===
Year	Location	Event	Position
2015	Moscow, Russia	Team Men's Sabre	1st
2017	Leipzig, Germany	Team Men's Sabre	3rd
2018	Wuxi, China	Team Men's Sabre	2nd
2019	Budapest, Hungary	Individual Men's Sabre	3rd
2019	Budapest, Hungary	Team Men's Sabre	3rd
2022	Cairo, Egypt	Team Men's Sabre	3rd
2025	(Georgia (country)) Tbilisi, Georgia	Individual Men's Sabre	3rd
2025	(Georgia (country)) Tbilisi, Georgia	Team Men's Sabre	1st

=== European Championship ===
Year	Location	Event	Position
2015	Montreux, Switzerland	Team Men's Sabre	2nd
2016	Toruń, Poland	Team Men's Sabre	2nd
2017	(Georgia (country)) Tbilisi, Georgia	Individual Men's Sabre	3rd
2017	(Georgia (country)) Tbilisi, Georgia	Team Men's Sabre	2nd
2018	Novi Sad, Serbia	Team Men's Sabre	2nd
2019	Düsseldorf, Germany	Team Men's Sabre	3rd
2022	Antalya, Turkey	Individual Men's Sabre	2nd
2024	Basel, Switzerland	Individual Men's Sabre	2nd
2025	Genoa, Italy	Team Men's Sabre	2nd

=== Grand Prix ===
Date	Location	Event	Position
2017-03-31	Seoul, South Korea	Individual Men's Sabre	3rd
2017-06-02	Moscow, Russia	Individual Men's Sabre	1st
2018-05-11	Moscow, Russia	Individual Men's Sabre	2nd
2019-05-24	Moscow, Russia	Individual Men's Sabre	3rd
2020-01-10	Montreal, Canada	Individual Men's Sabre	2nd
2021-11-11	Orléans, France	Individual Men's Sabre	2nd

=== World Cup ===
Date	Location	Event	Position
2015-02-20	Warsaw, Poland	Individual Men's Sabre	3rd
2016-05-13	Madrid, Spain	Individual Men's Sabre	3rd
2016-11-04	Dakar, Senegal	Individual Men's Sabre	3rd
2018-02-02	Padua, Italy	Individual Men's Sabre	3rd
2019-02-01	Warsaw, Poland	Individual Men's Sabre	2nd
2019-03-08	Padua, Italy	Individual Men's Sabre	1st
2020-02-21	Warsaw, Poland	Individual Men's Sabre	3rd
2022-03-18	Budapest, Hungary	Individual Men's Sabre	2nd
2022-05-06	Madrid, Spain	Individual Men's Sabre	2nd
