= Vincent Anstett =

French fencer

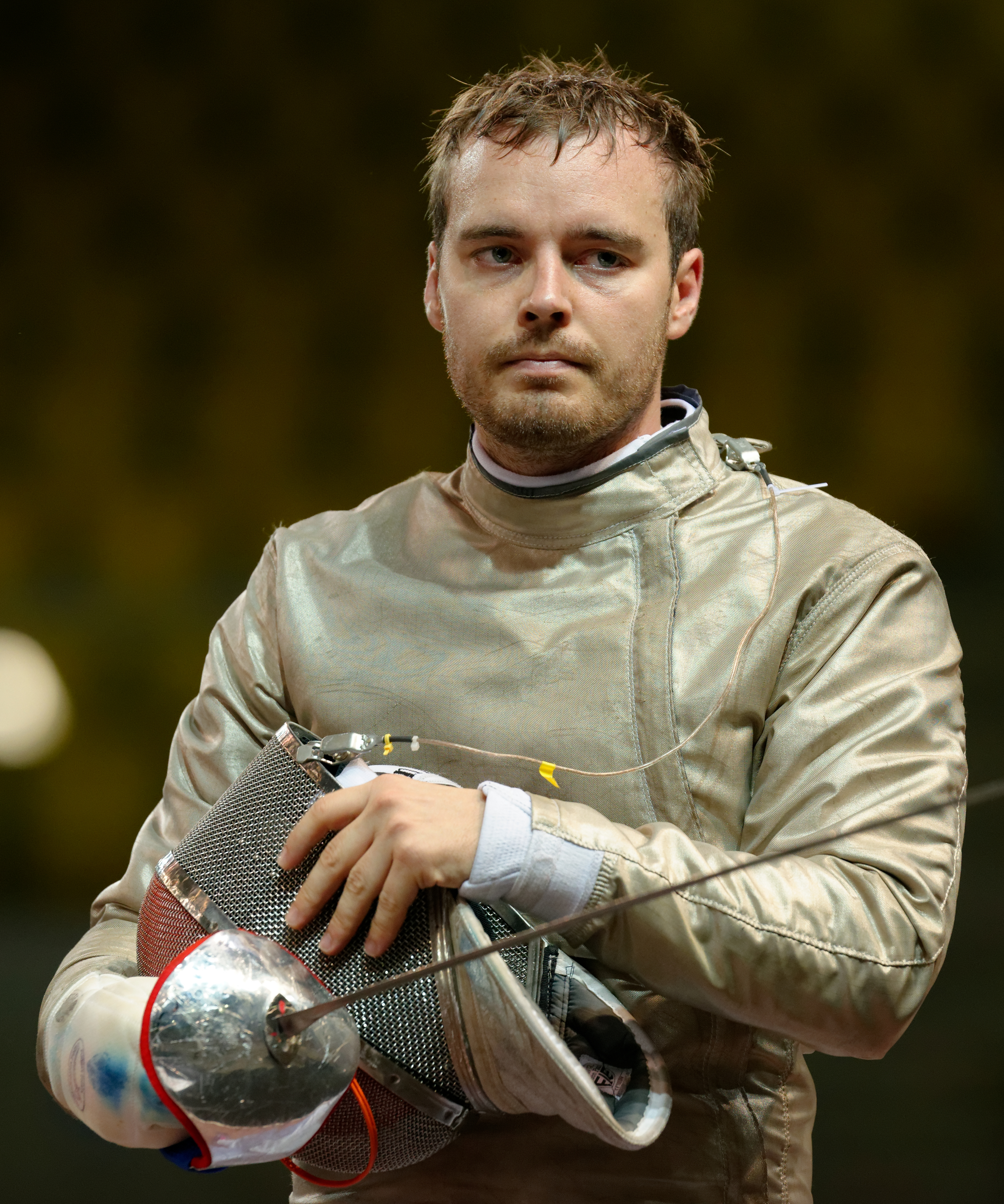
- Anstett at the 2014 European Fencing Championships

Personal information
- Born: 26 July 1982 (age 44) Strasbourg, France
- Height: 1.74 m (5 ft 9 in)
- Weight: 71 kg (157 lb)

Fencing career
- Sport: Fencing
- Country: France
- Weapon: Sabre
- Hand: right-handed
- Club: Souffel Escrime Club
- FIE ranking: current ranking
Medal record
World Championships
Gold medal – first place	2006 Turin	Team sabre
Silver medal – second place	2007 St.Petersburg	Team sabre
Bronze medal – third place	2005 Leipzig	Team sabre
Bronze medal – third place	2017 Leipzig	Individual sabre

Vincent Anstett (born 26 July 1982) is a French sabre fencer.

Anstett's greatest accomplishment is winning the gold medal in the sabre team event at the 2006 World Fencing Championships after beating Ukraine in the final. He accomplished this with his teammates Nicolas Lopez, Julien Pillet and Boris Sanson.

At the 2008 Summer Olympics, Anstett was a substitute for the same teammates that Anstett won the 2006 World Fencing Championships with, Nicolas Lopez, Julien Pillet and Boris Sanson, defeating the US in the final.

At the 2024 Paris Olympics, Anstett is the coach of the Egyptian fencing team. He was criticized for also coaching French fencers, when Egypt and France competed against each other.

== Achievements ==
2006 World Fencing Championships, team sabre
2007 World Fencing Championships, team sabre

Substitute for France's men's sabre team at the 2008 Beijing Olympics
