= Sherzod Mamutov =

Uzbekistani fencer

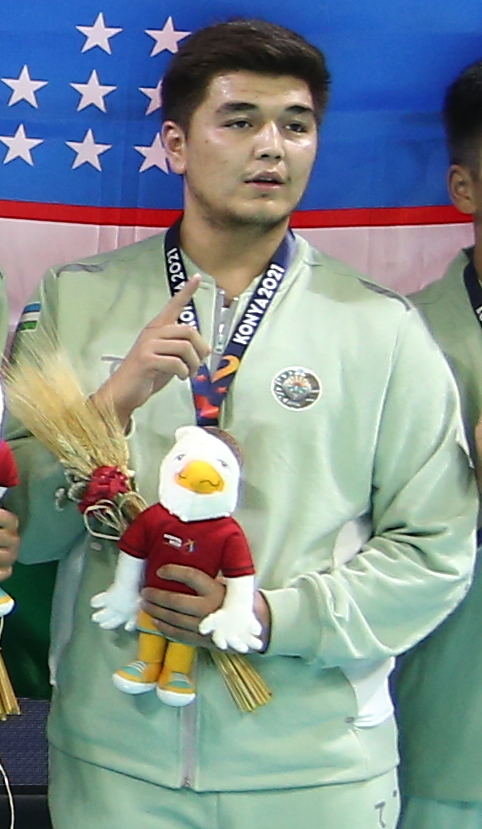

Personal information
- Nationality: Uzbekistan
- Born: 5 June 2002 (age 24)

Sport
- Sport: Fencing
Medal record
Men's fencing
Representing Uzbekistan
Islamic Solidarity Games
Bronze medal – third place	2021 Konya	Team Sabre

Sherzod Azamatovich Mamutov (born 5 June 2002) is an Uzbekistani sabre fencer. He competed in the 2020 Summer Olympics.
