= Mohamed Amer (fencer) =

Egyptian fencer (born 1997)

Personal information
- Nickname: Amer
- Born: 18 December 1997 (age 28) Cairo, Egypt

Fencing career
- Sport: Fencing
- Weapon: Sabre
- Years on national team: Egypt
- Club: Tim Morehouse Fencing Club
- FIE ranking: 20
Medal record
Men's sabre
Representing Egypt
World Championships
Bronze medal – third place	2026 Hong Kong	Individual
African Championships
Gold medal – first place	2024 Casablanca	individual
Silver medal – second place	2024 Casablanca	team

Mohamed Amer (born 18 December 1997) is an Egyptian fencer. He competed in the men's sabre event at the 2016 Summer Olympics, losing his only match. He also competed at the 2020 Summer Olympics in the men's sabre event and the men's sabre team event.
