= Mohammad Fotouhi =

Iranian fencer (born 1990)

Personal information
- Born: 5 December 1990 (age 35) Yazd, Iran

Fencing career
- Sport: Fencing
- Weapon: Sabre
- Hand: right-handed
Medal record
Men's sabre fencing
Representing Iran
Asian Games
Bronze medal – third place	2022 Hangzhou	Team
Asian Championships
Silver medal – second place	2013 Shanghai	Team
Silver medal – second place	2017 Hong Kong	Team
Silver medal – second place	2018 Bangkok	Team
Silver medal – second place	2019 Chiba	Team
Silver medal – second place	2024 Kuwait City	Team
Bronze medal – third place	2012 Wakayama	Team
Universiade
Silver medal – second place	2017 Taipei	Team
Bronze medal – third place	2017 Taipei	Individual
Islamic Solidarity Games
Gold medal – first place	2021 Konya	Team

Mohammad Fotouhi (Persian: محمد فتوحی; born 5 December 1990) is an Iranian fencer. He competed in the Men's team sabre events at the 2020 Summer Olympics in Tokyo 2021 (played against U.S. sabre team). He lost his only about in the individuals in the 2024 Paris Olympics.
