= Ilya Mokretsov =

Kazakhstani fencer

Personal information
- Full name: Ilya Vladimirovich Mokretsov
- Born: 17 April 1984 (age 42) Kazan, Tatarstan, Russian SFSR, Soviet Union
- Home town: Almaty, Kazakhstan
- Height: 1.78 m (5 ft 10 in)
- Weight: 73 kg (161 lb)

Fencing career
- Sport: Fencing
- Country: Russia; Kazakhstan
- Weapon: Sabre
- Hand: Right-handed
- National coach: Andrei Churbakov
- FIE ranking: current ranking
Medal record
Men's fencing
Representing Kazakhstan
Asian Championships
Bronze medal – third place	2013 Shanghai	Team sabre
Bronze medal – third place	2015 Singapore	Team sabre

Ilya Vladimirovich Mokretsov (sometimes spelled Mokretcov, Russian: Илья Владимирович Мокрецов; born 17 April 1984, in Kazan) is a male sabre fencer who first represented Russia then Kazakhstan.

== Career ==
Mokretsov took up fencing at age twelve after coach Lev Belusov scouted him at the ice rink. In 2000 he joined the Russian junior national team, which became team world champions in 2002. At the Junior World Championships he earned an individual silver medal in 2004. The next year, at the 2005 Summer Universiade in İzmir, he joined as a reserve a Russian team made up of experienced fencers Aleksey Frosin, Aleksey Yakimenko and Aleksey Dyachenko, who won the team gold medal.

His senior career proved less successful. He was called into the Russian national team only in 2009 and 2010, after the retirement of fencer Stanislav Pozdnyakov, but he never made it onto the podium: Russia ranked fourth both at the 2009 World Championships and the 2010 European Championships.

During the 2012–13 season, he took the Kazakhstani citizenship. Under his new colours, he won a team bronze medal at the 2013 and 2015 Asian Championships. In 2016 he qualified to the 2016 Summer Olympics with a top three finish at the Prague pre-olympic tournament.
