= Max Hartung =

German fencer

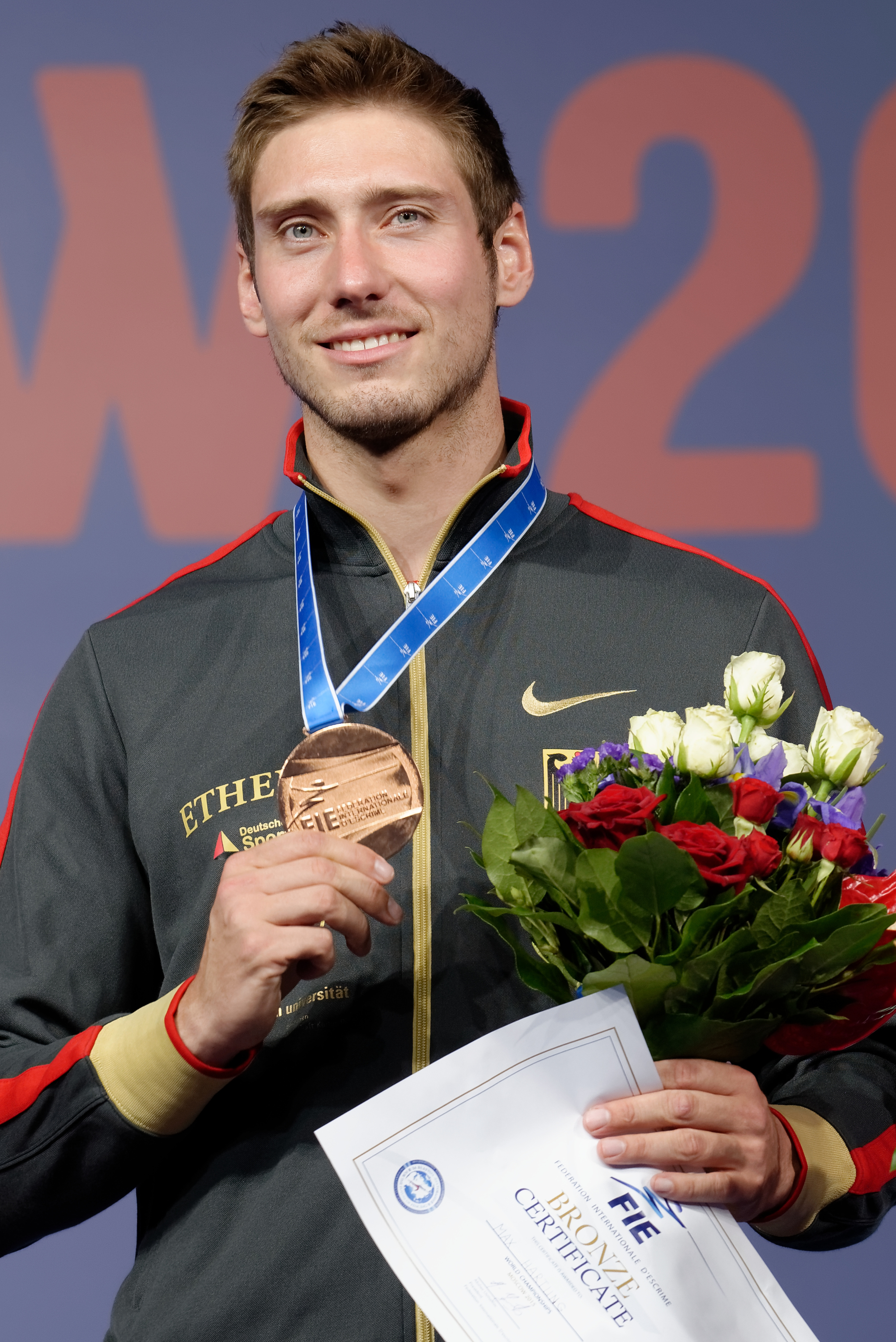

Personal information
- Full name: Maximilian Hartung
- Nationality: German
- Born: 8 October 1989 (age 37) Aachen, West Germany
- Home town: Koeln, Germany
- Height: 1.90 m (6 ft 3 in)
- Weight: 88 kg (194 lb; 13.9 st)
- Website: max-hartung.de

Fencing career
- Sport: Fencing
- Weapon: Sabre
- Hand: right-handed
- National coach: Vilmoș Szabo
- Club: TSV Bayer Dormagen
- Head coach: Vilmoș Szabo
- FIE ranking: current ranking
Medal record
World Championships
Gold medal – first place	2014 Kazan	Team
Bronze medal – third place	2015 Moscow	Individual
Bronze medal – third place	2015 Moscow	Team
European Championships
Gold medal – first place	2015 Montreaux	Team
Gold medal – first place	2017 Tbilisi	Individual
Gold medal – first place	2018 Novi Sad	Individual
Gold medal – first place	2019 Düsseldorf	Team
Silver medal – second place	2011 Sheffield	Team
Silver medal – second place	2015 Montreux	Individual
Bronze medal – third place	2010 Leipzig	Team
Bronze medal – third place	2011 Sheffield	Individual
Bronze medal – third place	2012 Legnano	Team
Bronze medal – third place	2014 Strasbourg	Team
Bronze medal – third place	2018 Novi Sad	Team
Bronze medal – third place	2019 Düsseldorf	Individual

Maximilian Hartung (born 8 October 1989) is a German right-handed sabre fencer, two-time team European champion, two-time individual European champion, 2014 team world champion, and two-time Olympian.

Hartung is chairman of the Athletes Commission of the German Olympic Sports Confederation and the founding president of Athleten Deutschland e.V. He was a member of the Sporthilfe supervisory board for four years, four years in the board of the German Fencing Federation and two years in the board of the German Olympic Committee as the voice of the athletes. He completed his studies in politics, sociology and economics at the Zeppelin University in Friedrichshafen and the Universiteit Gent.

With Athletes Germany, Hartung achieved a victory over IOC before the Federal Cartel Office. The advertising guidelines for German athletes at Olympic Games have been relaxed. Following public criticism, the German Armed Forces have changed their sports promotion program after talks between Minister of Defense Ursula von der Leyen, Silke Kassner and Max Hartung. The Athletes Germany e. V, which he co-founded, is supported by the federal government with 450,000 euros per year and is the first athlete representation worldwide that is independent of the NOK. In addition, on the initiative of Athletes Germany, the federal government introduced direct athlete support of 7 million euros for the first time and passed a pension package for athletes.

Hartung drew attention to himself around the postponement of the 2020 Summer Olympic Games in Tokyo, Japan. He was the first athlete in the world to declare, before the official decision of the IOC, that he would not compete in the Olympic Games in July 2020 due to the COVID-19 pandemic, out of consideration for the population living in Japan and global public health.

== Medal Record ==
=== World Championship ===
Year	Location	Event	Position
2014	Kazan, Russia	Team Men's Sabre	1st
2015	Moscow, Russia	Individual Men's Sabre	3rd
2015	Moscow, Russia	Team Men's Sabre	3rd

=== European Championship ===
Year	Location	Event	Position
2010	Leipzig, Germany	Team Men's Sabre	3rd
2011	Sheffield, United Kingdom	Individual Men's Sabre	3rd
2011	Sheffield, United Kingdom	Team Men's Sabre	2nd
2012	Legnano, Italy	Team Men's Sabre	3rd
2014	Strasbourg, France	Team Men's Sabre	3rd
2015	Montreux, Switzerland	Individual Men's Sabre	2nd
2015	Montreux, Switzerland	Team Men's Sabre	1st
2017	(Georgia (country)) Tbilisi, Georgia	Individual Men's Sabre	1st
2018	Novi Sad, Serbia	Individual Men's Sabre	1st
2018	Novi Sad, Serbia	Team Men's Sabre	3rd
2019	Düsseldorf, Germany	Individual Men's Sabre	3rd
2019	Düsseldorf, Germany	Team Men's Sabre	1st

=== Grand Prix ===
Date	Location	Event	Position
05/17/2014	Warsaw, Poland	Individual Men's Sabre	2nd
04/26/2019	Seoul, South Korea	Individual Men's Sabre	3rd
05/24/2019	Moscow, Russia	Individual Men's Sabre	3rd

=== World Cup ===
Date	Location	Event	Position
02/18/2011	Padua, Italy	Individual Men's Sabre	3rd
05/01/2015	Madrid, Spain	Individual Men's Sabre	3rd
05/19/2017	Madrid, Spain	Individual Men's Sabre	1st
02/01/2019	Warsaw, Poland	Individual Men's Sabre	3rd
03/22/2019	Budapest, Hungary	Individual Men's Sabre	1st
03/08/2019	Padua, Italy	Individual Men's Sabre	3rd
05/10/2019	Madrid, Spain	Individual Men's Sabre	1st

== Voluntary commitment ==
In 2013 he was elected athlete spokesman of the German Fencing Federation. Since September 2014, Hartung has also been a member of the Athletes' Commission of the DOSB, since February 2017 he has been its chairman. He is also a member of the supervisory board of the Stiftung deutsche Sporthilfe.

He is the founding president of Athleten Deutschland e.V. After the challenges of the athletes' representatives in the DOSB in the years 2014 to 2016, the Athletes' Commission decided to found an independent association, independent of the DOSB, to strengthen the athletes' interests. Decisive factors for the founding of the association were the dissatisfaction with the doping scandal in Russia, the many cases of sexualized violence in sports, the competitive sports reform with a strong medal focus and the introduction of the anti-doping law. Athletes Germany today has 450,000 Euro annually and employs five staff.

The club fights for a German sports system that offers athletes the best conditions in the world for developing their sporting and personal potential and respects them as human beings. It fights for athletes in all arenas and encourages them to shape the future of their sport themselves.

The organization aims to enable athletes to improve communication between athletes and institutions. Athletes Germany shall represent the interests of the athletes towards the federations, but also towards all other actors in sports, politics and society and develop the legal relationship and the nomination procedures between athletes and federations. The association has set itself the goal of promoting athlete support that enables athletes to embark on a competitive sports career without having to fear disadvantages or existential fears, and that promotes fair and clean sports.

== Podcast ==
With his teammate Matyas Szabo, Hartung runs the largest German-language fencing podcast. On the way to the Olympic Games in Tokyo 2020, the two of them recorded more than 40 episodes and let the audience take a look behind the mask. During the lockdown, the team also recorded training videos for children who had no access to their gyms and published them on YouTube. They have been awarded for this project by Beyond Crisis and Germany Land of Ideas.
