= Boladé Apithy =

French fencer (born 1985)

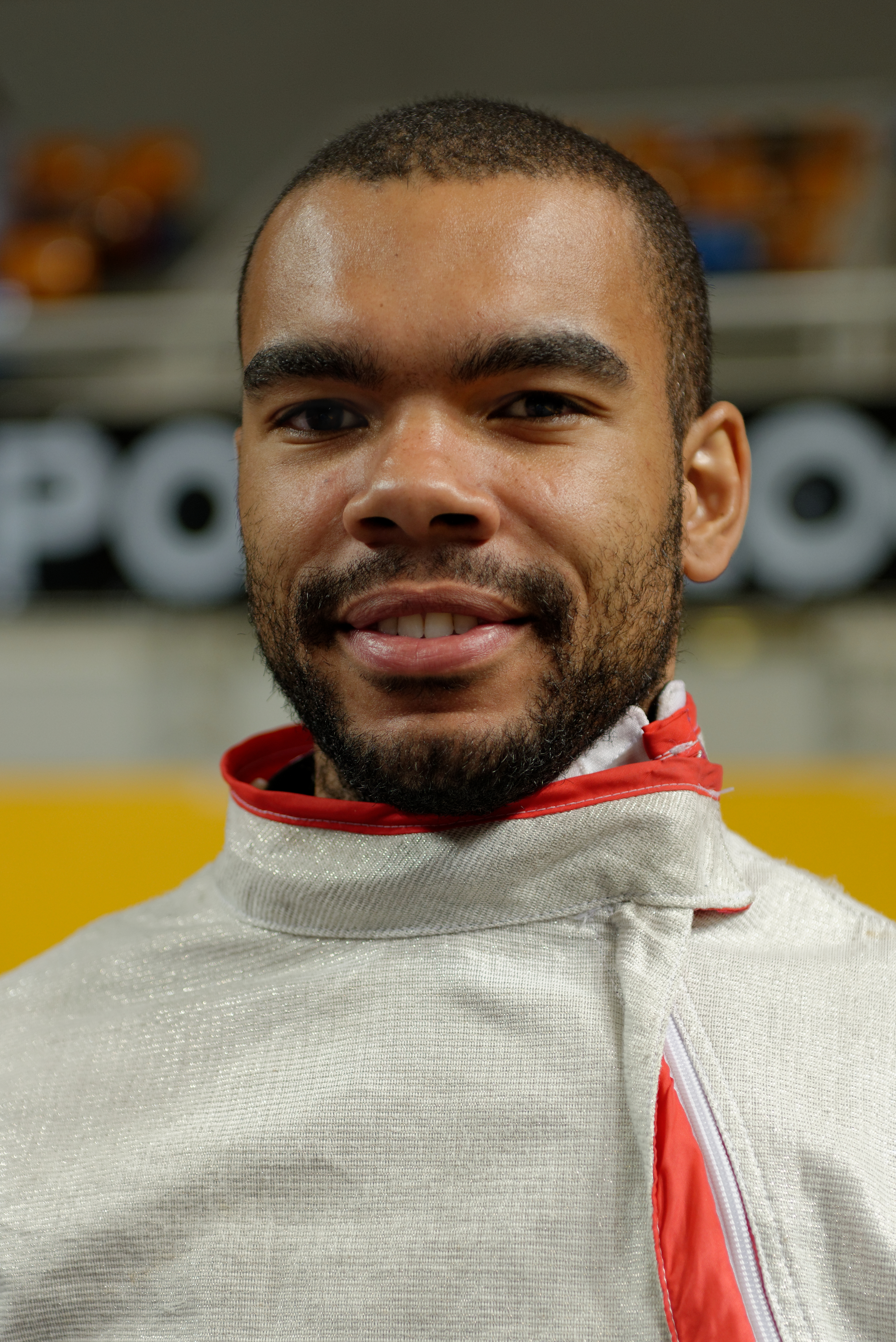
- Apithy in 2013

Personal information
- Born: 21 August 1985 (age 41) Dijon
- Height: 1.80 m (5 ft 11 in)
- Weight: 78 kg (172 lb)

Fencing career
- Sport: Fencing
- Weapon: Sabre
- Hand: right-handed
- National coach: Frédéric Baylac
- Club: ASPTT Dijon
- Head coach: Jean-Pierre Harbelot
- FIE ranking: current ranking
Medal record
Men's sabre
Representing France
Olympic Games
Bronze medal – third place	2024 Paris	Team
European Games
Gold medal – first place	2023 Kraków–Małopolska	Team
European Championships
Gold medal – first place	2023 Kraków	Team
Silver medal – second place	2008 Kyiv	Team
Silver medal – second place	2011 Sheffield	Individual
Silver medal – second place	2012 Legnano	Individual
Bronze medal – third place	2009 Plovdiv	Team
Bronze medal – third place	2010 Leipzig	Individual
Bronze medal – third place	2022 Antalya	Individual

Boladé Apithy (born August 21, 1985, in Dijon, France) is a French right-handed sabre fencer.

== Personal life ==
His brother Yémi is also a sabre fencer; he represents Benin.

== Medal record ==
=== European Championship ===
Year	Location	Event	Position
2008	Kyiv, Ukraine	Team Men's Sabre	2nd
2009	Plovdiv, Bulgaria	Team Men's Sabre	3rd
2010	Leipzig, Germany	Individual Men's Sabre	3rd
2011	Sheffield, United Kingdom	Individual Men's Sabre	2nd
2012	Legnano, Italy	Individual Men's Sabre	2nd
2022	Antalya, Turkey	Individual Men's Sabre	3rd

=== Grand Prix ===
Date	Location	Event	Position
2019-05-24	Moscow, Russia	Individual Men's Sabre	1st
2020-01-10	Montreal, Canada	Individual Men's Sabre	1st
2022-05-20	Padua, Italy	Individual Men's Sabre	3rd

=== World Cup ===
Date	Location	Event	Position
2009-05-15	Warsaw, Poland	Individual Men's Sabre	2nd
2010-06-18	(United States) New York, New York	Individual Men's Sabre	2nd
2011-04-28	Athens, Greece	Individual Men's Sabre	3rd
2012-06-22	(United States) Chicago, Illinois	Individual Men's Sabre	3rd
2016-12-02	Győr, Hungary	Individual Men's Sabre	3rd
2017-12-01	Győr, Hungary	Individual Men's Sabre	3rd
2022-01-15	(Georgia (country)) Tbilisi, Georgia	Individual Men's Sabre	3rd
