= Kaito Streets =

Japanese fencer (born 1994)

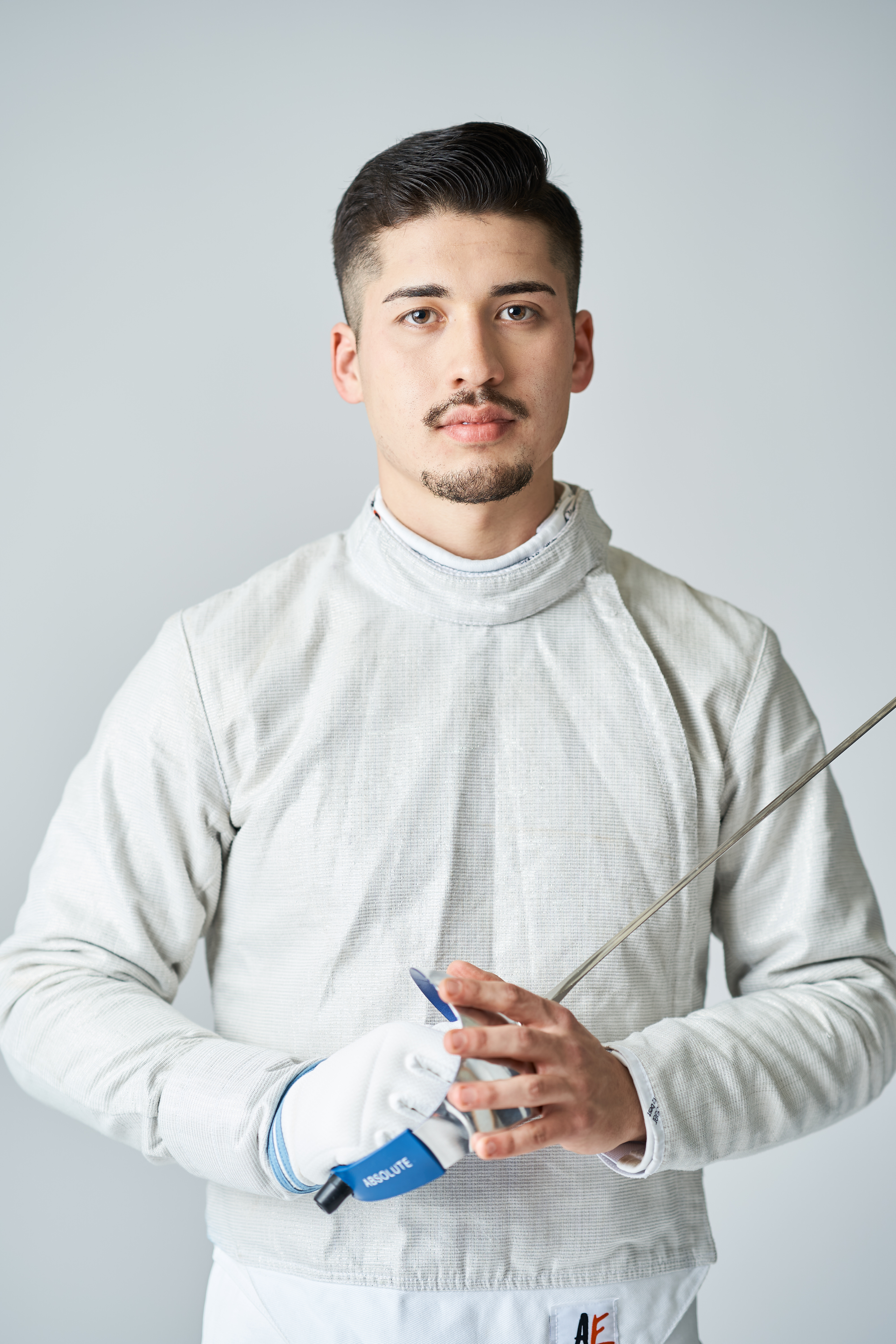

Personal information
- Full name: Kaito C Streets
- Nationality: Japan
- Born: 6 June 1994 (age 32) Yokohama, Japan
- Height: 175 cm (5 ft 9 in)
- Weight: 76 kg (168 lb)

Sport
- Sport: Fencing
- Event: Sabre
- College team: Pennsylvania State University

Kaito Streets (born 6 June 1994) is a Japanese right-handed sabre fencer and 2020 Olympian. He was born in Yokohama, Japan to a Japanese mother and English-American father. He is a two-time US National Champion and two-time Japanese National Champion. He competed in the 2020 Tokyo Olympics in the Fencing Men's Sabre Individual and Team Events.

== Early life ==
At the age of seven, he moved to Redwood City, California. A year later he began his career when he joined a recreational fencing program at Red Morton Community Center. He quickly found success, winning the Youth 10 US National Championships. By the time he was 15, he made the US National Team in the Cadet Category and began competing internationally. Following his Cadet years, he moved onto the US Junior National Team where he won the 2012 US Junior National Championships. In 2013, he made the US Junior World Championships Team and competed in Poreč, Croatia.

== College ==
Streets received a scholarship to attend Pennsylvania State University, where he graduated with a degree in Business Management. At the 2014 NCAA Championships, Streets secured first place and became the 2014 NCAA Men's Sabre Champion. He also helped lead the team to their 13th NCAA Fencing Championship title. He was also awarded First Team All-American. For his junior year, he placed sixth at the 2015 NCAA Fencing Championships and he was awarded Second Team All-American. In his last year, he placed third in the 2016 NCAA Fencing Championships and was awarded First Team All-American. While he was on the Varsity Penn State Fencing Team, he was the captain during the 2014-2015 and 2015–2016 seasons.

== Professional career ==
In 2015, Streets switched to represent his birth country of Japan and joined the Japanese National Team. He represented Japan at the 2016, 2017, 2018, 2019, 2022 Asian Championships (2020 and 2021 Asian Championships were cancelled due to COVID-19). For World Championships, he represented Japan in 2017, 2018, 2019, and 2022 (2020 World Championships were cancelled due to COVID-19, the Olympics were held in place of a 2021 World Championships event). Streets competed in the 2020 Tokyo Olympics in the Fencing Men's Sabre Individual and Team Events which were held in Tokyo, Japan in July 2021.

== Medal record ==
=== Asian Championship ===
Year	Location	Event	Position
2018	Bangkok, Thailand	Team Men's Sabre	3rd
2019	Chiba, Japan	Team Men's Sabre	3rd
2022	Seoul, South Korea	Team Men's Sabre	2nd
2025	Bali, Indonesia	Team Men's Sabre	1st
2025	Bali, Indonesia	Individual Men's Sabre	3rd

== Personal life ==
On 24 July 2021, Streets in his Olympic debut, went viral on TikTok after he posted a video of him getting hit in his groin by Eli Dershwitz. The video amassed 6.5 million views and 1.2 million likes. His TikTok account and many of his videos showcasing his experience at the Olympics were picked up by a number of news outlets including E! News, The New York Times and Nylon.

== Away from fencing ==
He joined SASUKE 39 at 28 December 2021.He has given number 83. He failed Stage 1 at Dragon Glider.

== See also ==
List of Pennsylvania State University Olympians
