= Ali Pakdaman =

Iranian fencer (born 1990)

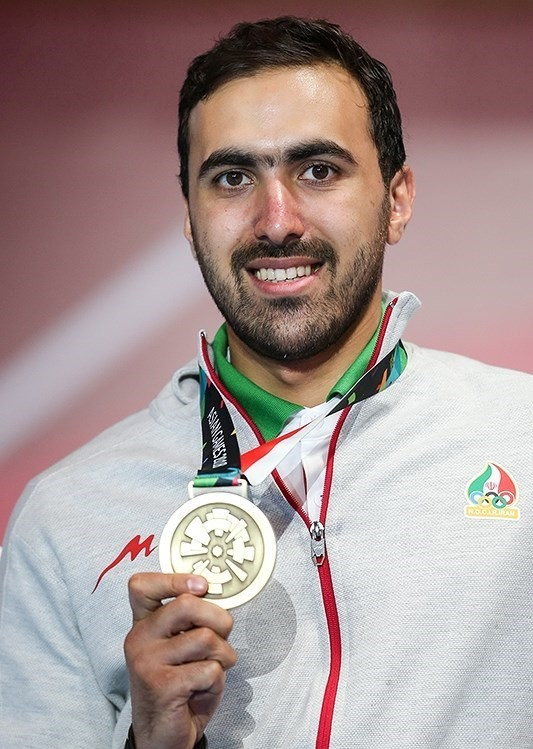

Personal information
- Full name: Seyed Ali Esmaeilzadeh Pakdaman
- Born: 23 August 1990 (age 36)

Fencing career
- Sport: Fencing
- Weapon: Sabre
- Hand: right-handed
Medal record
Men's sabre
Representing Iran
Asian Games
Silver medal – second place	2014 Incheon	Team
Silver medal – second place	2018 Jakarta–Palembang	Team
Bronze medal – third place	2018 Jakarta–Palembang	Individual
Bronze medal – third place	2022 Hangzhou	Team
Bronze medal – third place	2026 Aichi-Nagoya	Individual
Asian Championships
Gold medal – first place	2023 Wuxi	Individual
Silver medal – second place	2013 Shanghai	Team
Silver medal – second place	2015 Singapore	Team
Silver medal – second place	2016 Wuxi	Individual
Silver medal – second place	2017 Hong Kong	Team
Silver medal – second place	2018 Bangkok	Team
Silver medal – second place	2019 Chiba	Team
Silver medal – second place	2023 Wuxi	Team
Silver medal – second place	2024 Kuwait City	Team
Bronze medal – third place	2012 Wakayama	Team
Bronze medal – third place	2014 Suwon	Individual
Bronze medal – third place	2014 Suwon	Team
Bronze medal – third place	2017 Hong Kong	Individual
Bronze medal – third place	2018 Bangkok	Individual
Bronze medal – third place	2022 Seoul	Team
Universiade
Silver medal – second place	2017 Taipei	Team sabre
Islamic Solidarity Games
Gold medal – first place	2021 Konya	Team
Silver medal – second place	2021 Konya	Individual
Bronze medal – third place	2025 Riyadh	team

Seyed Ali Esmaeilzadeh Pakdaman (Persian: سید علی اسماعیل‌زاده پاکدامن; born 23 August 1990) is an Iranian fencer. He competed in the men's sabre event at the 2016 and 2020 Summer Olympics. He also competed at the 2024 Summer Olympics in both the individual and team men's sabre event. His team got 4th in the team event after beating number two seed USA 45–44, but then losing its next two matches to Hungary and France.
