= Kento Yoshida =

Japanese fencer (born 1992)

Personal information
- Nationality: Japan
- Born: 10 December 1992 (age 33) Morioka, Japan

Sport
- Sport: Fencing
Medal record
Men's fencing
Representing Japan
Asian Games
Silver medal – second place	2026 Aichi-Nagoya	Men's team sabre

Kento Yoshida (born 10 December 1992) is a Japanese right-handed sabre fencer and Olympian. He competed in the 2020 Tokyo Olympic Games.

== Medal Record ==
=== Asian Championship ===
Year	Location	Event	Position
2022	Seoul, South Korea	Team Men's Sabre	2nd

=== Grand Prix ===
Date	Location	Event	Position
2021-11-11	Orléans, France	Individual Men's Sabre	3rd
