= Fencing at the 2025 Summer World University Games – Men's individual sabre =

Men's individual sabre at the 2025 Summer World University Games
- Venue: Messe Essen
- Location: Essen
- Dates: 17 July
- Competitors: 66 from 23 nations

Medalists
gold medal	Park Sang-won	South Korea
silver medal	Gergő Horváth	Hungary
bronze medal	Hwang Hee-geun	South Korea
bronze medal	Moritz Schenkel	Germany

The men's individual sabre at the 2025 Summer World University Games in Rhine-Ruhr, Germany was held 17 July 2025. Park Sang-won of South Korea won the gold medal. Gergő Horváth from Hungary claimed the silver medal sand the bronze medals were awarded to Moritz Schenkel of Germany and Hwang Hee-geun, also representing South Korea.

== Pool Results ==
66 fencers are divided into pools of 6 or 7 competitors. Every fencer plays against everyone else in their pool. Bouts are played to 5 touches or until 3 minutes elapse. Results determine the seeding for the elimination bracket. The bottom-ranked fencers (typically 20-30%) are eliminated at this stage.

Qualified for Table of 32
Qualified for Table of 64

=== Pool 1 ===
#	Seed	Athlete	1	2	3	4	5	6	7	V#	M#	Ind.	TG	TR	Diff.	RP
1	21	Chang Hoi Chun (HKG)		V_{5}	D_{3}	D_{2}	V_{5}	V_{5}	V_{5}	4	6	0.67	25	16	9	2
2	59	Abdulaziz Al-Mansaf (KSA)	D_{1}		V_{5}	D_{1}	D_{2}	V_{5}	D_{3}	2	6	0.33	17	28	-11	7
3	62	Casper Mika (USA)	V_{5}	D_{4}		D_{0}	D_{1}	V_{5}	V_{5}	3	6	0.50	20	24	-4	3
4	1	Park Sang-won (KOR)	V_{5}	V_{5}	V_{5}		V_{5}	V_{5}	V_{5}	6	6	1.00	30	11	19	1
5	40	Magsud Huseynli (AZE)	D_{2}	V_{5}	V_{5}	D_{3}		D_{4}	D_{3}	2	6	0.33	22	23	-1	4
6	20	Marcel Broniszewski (POL)	D_{0}	D_{4}	D_{3}	D_{4}	V_{5}		V_{5}	2	6	0.33	21	27	-6	5
7	41	Jarl Kürbis (GER)	D_{3}	V_{5}	D_{3}	D_{1}	V_{5}	D_{3}		2	6	0.33	20	26	-6	6

=== Pool 2 ===
#	Seed	Athlete	1	2	3	4	5	6	7	V#	M#	Ind.	TG	TR	Diff.	RP
1	58	Dhruv Walia (IND)		D_{1}	V_{5}	D_{3}	D_{2}	D_{1}	D_{3}	1	6	0.17	15	26	-11	6
2	2	Lim Jae-yoon (KOR)	V_{5}		V_{5}	D_{4}	D_{2}	V_{5}	V_{5}	4	6	0.67	26	17	9	3
3	64	Hugo Penker (SWE)	D_{1}	D_{0}		D_{2}	D_{1}	D_{1}	D_{1}	0	6	0.00	6	30	-24	7
4	42	Konstanty Kutek (POL)	V_{5}	V_{5}	V_{5}		V_{5}	V_{5}	V_{5}	6	6	1.00	30	14	16	1
5	38	Toprak Altınçekiç (TUR)	V_{5}	V_{5}	V_{5}	D_{2}		V_{5}	V_{5}	5	6	0.83	27	17	10	2
6	22	Andreas Müller (GER)	V_{5}	D_{3}	V_{5}	D_{1}	D_{4}		D_{0}	2	6	0.33	18	22	-4	5
7	19	Joaquín González (ESP)	V_{5}	D_{3}	V_{5}	D_{2}	D_{3}	V_{5}		3	6	0.50	23	19	4	4

=== Pool 3 ===
#	Seed	Athlete	1	2	3	4	5	6	7	V#	M#	Ind.	TG	TR	Diff.	RP
1	23	Eric Seefeld (GER)		D_{4}	V_{5}	D_{2}	V_{5}	V_{5}	V_{5}	4	6	0.67	26	17	9	1
2	39	Abhay Shinde (IND)	V_{5}		V_{5}	D_{0}	V_{5}	D_{3}	V_{5}	4	6	0.67	23	21	2	3
3	43	Baptiste Baylac (FRA)	D_{1}	D_{4}		V_{5}	D_{2}	V_{5}	V_{5}	3	6	0.50	22	21	1	4
4	3	Hugo Ho (HKG)	V_{5}	V_{5}	D_{1}		V_{5}	V_{5}	D_{3}	4	6	0.67	24	16	8	2
5	60	Axel Elmfeldt (SWE)	D_{1}	D_{0}	V_{5}	D_{0}		D_{1}	D_{2}	1	6	0.17	9	27	-18	7
6	65	Jorge Rodríguez (MEX)	D_{4}	V_{5}	D_{2}	D_{4}	V_{5}		D_{4}	2	6	0.33	24	24	0	6
7	18	Enes Kalender (TUR)	D_{1}	D_{3}	D_{3}	V_{5}	V_{5}	V_{5}		3	6	0.50	22	24	-2	5

=== Pool 4 ===
#	Seed	Athlete	1	2	3	4	5	6	7	V#	M#	Ind.	TG	TR	Diff.	RP
1	24	Julio Pérez (ESP)		V_{5}	D_{2}	D_{4}	V_{5}	V_{5}	V_{5}	4	6	0.67	26	17	9	2
2	66	Jorelle See (SGP)	D_{2}		V_{5}	D_{1}	V_{5}	D_{1}	V_{5}	3	6	0.50	19	21	-2	5
3	37	Lucas Guilley (FRA)	V_{5}	D_{4}		V_{5}	V_{5}	D_{2}	V_{5}	4	6	0.67	26	19	7	3
4	44	Lukas Chiari (AUT)	V_{5}	V_{5}	D_{3}		D_{2}	D_{3}	V_{5}	3	6	0.50	23	23	0	4
5	17	Bertalan Tóth (HUN)	D_{2}	D_{1}	D_{3}	V_{5}		D_{1}	V_{5}	2	6	0.33	17	24	-7	6
6	4	Hwang Hee-geun (KOR)	D_{3}	V_{5}	V_{5}	V_{5}	V_{5}		V_{5}	5	6	0.83	28	13	15	1
7	57	Daniel Ringius (SWE)	D_{0}	D_{1}	D_{1}	D_{3}	D_{2}	D_{1}		0	6	0.00	8	30	-22	7

=== Pool 5 ===
#	Seed	Athlete	1	2	3	4	5	6	7	V#	M#	Ind.	TG	TR	Diff.	RP
1	56	Ali Al-Hashem (KSA)		D_{1}	D_{1}	V_{5}	D_{4}	D_{0}	D_{0}	1	6	0.17	11	26	-15	6
2	5	Mattia Rea (ITA)	V_{5}		V_{5}	V_{5}	V_{5}	V_{5}	D_{4}	5	6	0.83	29	10	19	1
3	46	Saleh Mammadov (AZE)	V_{5}	D_{1}		V_{5}	D_{1}	V_{5}	D_{0}	3	6	0.50	17	22	-5	5
4	63	Chirag Nain (IND)	D_{1}	D_{0}	D_{2}		D_{2}	D_{0}	D_{2}	0	6	0.00	7	30	-23	7
5	36	Kuanysh Ergashbay (KAZ)	V_{5}	D_{2}	V_{5}	V_{5}		V_{5}	V_{5}	5	6	0.83	27	20	7	2
6	25	Benedek Vigh (HUN)	V_{5}	V_{5}	D_{4}	V_{5}	D_{4}		D_{4}	3	6	0.50	27	19	8	4
7	16	Hibiki Kato (JPN)	V_{5}	D_{1}	V_{5}	V_{5}	D_{4}	V_{5}		4	6	0.67	25	16	9	3

=== Pool 6 ===
#	Seed	Athlete	1	2	3	4	5	6	7	V#	M#	Ind.	TG	TR	Diff.	RP
1	15	Ali Al-Bahrani (KSA)		V_{5}	D_{0}	D_{2}	D_{4}	V_{5}	D_{2}	2	6	0.33	18	22	-4	5
2	35	Piotr Szczepanik (POL)	D_{1}		D_{4}	V_{5}	V_{5}	V_{5}	D_{3}	3	6	0.50	23	24	-1	4
3	26	Moritz Schenkel (GER)	V_{5}	V_{5}		V_{5}	V_{5}	V_{5}	V_{5}	6	6	1.00	30	16	14	1
4	6	Arnav Raja (AUS)	V_{5}	D_{4}	D_{4}		V_{5}	V_{5}	D_{4}	3	6	0.50	27	18	9	3
5	61	Ethan Huang (USA)	V_{5}	D_{3}	D_{1}	D_{1}		V_{5}	D_{3}	2	6	0.33	18	24	-6	6
6	55	Aditya Angal (IND)	D_{1}	D_{2}	D_{3}	D_{0}	D_{0}		D_{0}	0	6	0.00	6	30	-24	7
7	45	Reo Hiwatashi (JPN)	V_{5}	V_{5}	D_{4}	V_{5}	V_{5}	V_{5}		5	6	0.83	29	17	12	2

=== Pool 7 ===
#	Seed	Athlete	1	2	3	4	5	6	V#	M#	Ind.	TG	TR	Diff.	RP
1	54	Esteban Hoarau (AUS)		D_{3}	D_{3}	D_{2}	D_{4}	D_{2}	0	5	0.00	14	25	-11	6
2	34	Murad Akbarov (AZE)	V_{5}		D_{1}	D_{2}	D_{4}	D_{0}	1	5	0.20	12	23	-11	5
3	47	Nurmukhammed Zhailybay (KAZ)	V_{5}	V_{5}		V_{5}	V_{5}	V_{5}	5	5	1.00	25	9	16	1
4	7	Edoardo Reale (ITA)	V_{5}	V_{5}	D_{2}		V_{5}	V_{5}	4	5	0.80	22	15	7	2
5	13	Hayato Tsubo (JPN)	V_{5}	V_{5}	D_{3}	D_{2}		V_{5}	3	5	0.60	20	19	1	3
6	27	Asier Olangua (ESP)	V_{5}	V_{5}	D_{0}	D_{4}	D_{1}		2	5	0.40	15	17	-2	4

=== Pool 8 ===
#	Seed	Athlete	1	2	3	4	5	6	V#	M#	Ind.	TG	TR	Diff.	RP
1	33	Cosimo Bertini (ITA)		V_{5}	V_{5}	D_{2}	V_{5}	D_{1}	3	5	0.60	18	12	6	3
2	53	Ku Long In (MAC)	D_{0}		D_{0}	D_{3}	V_{5}	D_{1}	1	5	0.20	9	23	-14	6
3	18	Muhammed Kalender (TUR)	D_{0}	V_{5}		D_{2}	V_{5}	D_{2}	2	5	0.40	14	18	-4	4
4	48	Bexultan Abzhal (KAZ)	V_{5}	V_{5}	V_{5}		D_{3}	V_{5}	4	5	0.80	23	14	9	2
5	8	Yuto Rikitake (JPN)	D_{2}	D_{3}	D_{3}	V_{5}		D_{3}	1	5	0.20	16	23	-7	5
6	14	Leung Tin Ching (HKG)	V_{5}	V_{5}	V_{5}	D_{2}	V_{5}		4	5	0.80	22	12	10	1

=== Pool 9 ===
#	Seed	Athlete	1	2	3	4	5	6	V#	M#	Ind.	TG	TR	Diff.	RP
1	49	Quentin Geoffroy (LAO)		D_{4}	V_{5}	D_{3}	D_{4}	V_{5}	2	5	0.40	21	20	1	4
2	12	Carlos Flórez (ESP)	V_{5}		V_{5}	V_{5}	V_{5}	D_{3}	4	5	0.80	23	18	5	1
3	52	Jurre Devos (BEL)	D_{2}	D_{3}		D_{3}	D_{1}	D_{4}	0	5	0.00	13	25	-12	6
4	9	Benedek Dallos (HUN)	V_{5}	D_{4}	V_{5}		D_{4}	V_{5}	3	5	0.60	23	20	3	3
5	29	François Maruelle (FRA)	V_{5}	D_{2}	V_{5}	V_{5}		V_{5}	4	5	0.80	22	18	4	2
6	32	Alex Brown (AUS)	D_{3}	V_{5}	V_{5}	D_{4}	D_{4}		2	5	0.40	21	22	-1	5

=== Pool 10 ===
#	Seed	Athlete	1	2	3	4	5	6	V#	M#	Ind.	TG	TR	Diff.	RP
1	50	Kamar Skeete (USA)		D_{0}	D_{2}	V_{5}	V_{5}	D_{3}	2	5	0.40	15	23	-8	4
2	30	Gergő Horváth (HUN)	V_{5}		D_{4}	V_{5}	V_{5}	V_{5}	4	5	0.80	24	12	12	2
3	11	Park Jung-ho (KOR)	V_{5}	V_{5}		V_{5}	V_{5}	V_{5}	5	5	1.00	25	16	9	1
4	10	Marco Mastrullo (ITA)	D_{4}	D_{3}	D_{3}		V_{5}	V_{5}	2	5	0.40	20	18	2	3
5	31	Abdullah Al-Mansaf (KSA)	D_{4}	D_{3}	D_{3}	D_{0}		V_{5}	1	5	0.20	15	21	-6	5
6	51	Kacper Nowinowski (POL)	V_{5}	D_{1}	D_{4}	D_{3}	D_{1}		1	5	0.20	14	23	-9	6

== Results bracket ==
Remaining fencers enter an Olympic-style single-elimination bracket (Table of 64, 32, 16, etc.). Elimination matches are played to 15 touches. Bouts consist of three periods of 3 minutes each, with a 1-minute break. In sabre, a break is also triggered automatically when one fencer reaches 8 touches. If time expires in a tie, a 1-minute priority minute is added to find a winner.

Table of 64
33	P Szczepanik (POL)	15
32	L Chiari (AUT)	2
17T	Lim Jy (KOR)	15
48	M Broniszewski (POL)	6
41	A Olangua (ESP)	15
24	A Shinde (IND)	13
25	C Bertini (ITA)	15
40	A Brown (AUS)	12
37	S Mammadov (AZE)	13
28	A Raja (AUS)	15
20T	H Kato (JPN)	15
44	J Rodriguez (MEX)	4
45	M Huseynli (AZE)	15
20T	Chang HC (HKG)	13
29	B Vigh (HUN)	15
36	C Mika (USA)	8
35	J See (SGP)	6
30	J González (ESP)	15
17T	J Pérez (ESP)	15
46T	A Al-Bahrani (KSA)	12
43	K Skeete (USA)	11
22	H Ho (HKG)	15
27	H Tsubo (JPN)	14
38	M Mastrullo (ITA)	15
39	Q Geoffroy (LAO)	15
26	B Dallos (HUN)	10
23	L Guilley (FRA)	11
42	M Kalender (TUR)	15
46T	A Müller (GER)	15
17T	E Seefeld (GER)	13
31	B Baylac (FRA)	15
34	E Kalender (TUR)	9

Table of 32
1	Park Sw (KOR)	15
33	P Szczepanik (POL)	13
17T	Lim Jy (KOR)	11
16	F Maruelle (FRA)	15
9	T Altınçekiç (TUR)	12
41	A Olangua (ESP)	15
25	C Bertini (ITA)	9
8	R Hiwatashi (JPN)	15
5	Park Jh (KOR)	15
28	A Raja (AUS)	10
20T	H Kato (JPN)	15
12	Leung TC (HKG)	9
13	B Abzhal (KAZ)	15
45	M Huseynli (AZE)	8
29	B Vigh (HUN)	13
4	M Schenkel (GER)	15
3	N Zhailybay (KAZ)	15
30	J González (ESP)	14
17T	J Pérez (ESP)	11
14	E Reale (ITA)	15
11	G Horváth (HUN)	15
22	H Ho (HKG)	10
38	M Mastrullo (ITA)	13
6	M Rea (ITA)	15
7	Hwang Hg (KOR)	15
39	Q Geoffroy (LAO)	7
42	M Kalender (TUR)	15
10	K Ergashbay (KAZ)	6
15	C Flórez (ESP)	15
46T	A Müller (GER)	14
31	B Baylac (FRA)	15
2	K Kutek (POL)	13

Table of 16
1	Park Sw (KOR)	15
16	F Maruelle (FRA)	9
41	A Olangua (ESP)	15
8	R Hiwatashi (JPN)	14
5	Park Jh (KOR)	15
20T	H Kato (JPN)	14
13	B Abzhal (KAZ)	12
4	M Schenkel (GER)	15
3	N Zhailybay (KAZ)	11
14	E Reale (ITA)	15
11	G Horváth (HUN)	15
6	M Rea (ITA)	10
7	Hwang Hg (KOR)	15
42	M Kalender (TUR)	6
15	C Flórez (ESP)	15
31	B Baylac (FRA)	11

Quarterfinals
1	Park Sw (KOR)	15
41	A Olangua (ESP)	8
5	Park Jh (KOR)	14
4	M Schenkel (GER)	15
14	E Reale (ITA)	12
11	G Horváth (HUN)	15
7	Hwang Hg (KOR)	15
15	C Flórez (ESP)	11

Semifinals
1	Park Sw (KOR)	15
4	M Schenkel (GER)	9
11	G Horváth (HUN)	15
7	Hwang Hg (KOR)	14

Final
1	Park Sw (KOR)	15
11	G Horváth (HUN)	8
