= Men's sabre at the 2026 World Fencing Championships =

- Venue: AsiaWorld–Expo
- Location: Hong Kong
- Dates: 24 July (preliminaries); 27 July (finals)
- Competitors: 165 from 57 nations

Medalists
gold medal	Pavel Graudyn	Russia
silver medal	Do Gyeong-dong	South Korea
bronze medal	Radu Nițu	Romania
bronze medal	Mohamed Amer	Egypt

The Men's sabre competition at the 2026 World Fencing Championships was held on 24 and 27 July 2026.

== Draw ==
=== Finals ===
Semifinals
(Russia) Pavel Graudyn	15
(Romania) Radu Nițu	8
(South Korea) Do Gyeong-dong	15
(Egypt) Mohamed Amer	12

Final
(Russia) Pavel Graudyn	15
(South Korea) Do Gyeong-dong	7

=== Top half ===
==== Section 1 ====
Round of 64
(France) Sébastien Patrice	15
(Spain) Jaime Flórez	8
(Italy) Michele Gallo	15
(Poland) Piotr Szczepanik	10
(China) Wei Zhenhao	15
(Kazakhstan) Kuanysh Ergashbay	7
(Uzbekistan) Alpamis Urakbaev	9
(Russia) Pavel Graudyn	15
(Tunisia) Farès Ferjani	15
(Azerbaijan) Abbas Hüseynov	11
(Uzbekistan) Sardor Abdukarimbekov	7
(Russia) Anatoliy Kostenko	15
(Hong Kong) Hugo Ho	15
(Hong Kong) Royce Chan	13
(Canada) Roman Norris	7
(South Korea) Oh Sang-uk	15

Round of 32
(France) Sébastien Patrice	15
(Italy) Michele Gallo	9
(China) Wei Zhenhao	7
(Russia) Pavel Graudyn	15
(Tunisia) Farès Ferjani	15
(Russia) Anatoliy Kostenko	10
(Hong Kong) Hugo Ho	15
(South Korea) Oh Sang-uk	13

Round of 16
(France) Sébastien Patrice	12
(Russia) Pavel Graudyn	15
(Tunisia) Farès Ferjani	15
(Hong Kong) Hugo Ho	9

Quarterfinals
(Russia) Pavel Graudyn	15
(Tunisia) Farès Ferjani	9

==== Section 2 ====
Round of 64
(United States) Colin Heathcock	11
(Germany) Matyas Szabo	15
(Turkey) Furkan Yaman	13
(Romania) Radu Nițu	15
(China) Shen Chenpeng	15
(Kazakhstan) Artyom Sarkissyan	8
(Uzbekistan) Islambek Abdazov	15
(Egypt) Ziad El-Sissy	9
(Germany) Frederic Kindler	14
(Spain) Jorge Casaus	15
(Spain) Santiago Madrigal	15
(Italy) Pietro Torre	10
(United States) Darii Lukashenko	15
(Italy) Cosimo Bertini	9
(United States) Antonio Heathcock	9
(France) Jean-Philippe Patrice	15

Round of 32
(Germany) Matyas Szabo	6
(Romania) Radu Nițu	15
(China) Shen Chenpeng	15
(Uzbekistan) Islambek Abdazov	12
(Spain) Jorge Casaus	12
(Spain) Santiago Madrigal	15
(United States) Darii Lukashenko	15
(France) Jean-Philippe Patrice	13

Round of 16
(Romania) Radu Nițu	15
(China) Shen Chenpeng	10
(Spain) Santiago Madrigal	10
(United States) Darii Lukashenko	15

Quarterfinals
(Romania) Radu Nițu	15
(United States) Darii Lukashenko	9

=== Bottom half ===
==== Section 3 ====
Round of 64
(Georgia (country)) Sandro Bazadze	14
(Mexico) Brandon Romo	11
(Egypt) Adham Moataz	14
(Germany) Philipp Methner	15
(Romania) Vlad Covaliu	15
(Hungary) Benedek Dallos	5
(China) Lin Xiao	9
(Japan) Mao Kokubo	15
(South Korea) Do Gyeong-dong	15
(Kazakhstan) Nazarbay Sattarkhan	9
(Uzbekistan) Musa Aymuratov	14
(South Korea) Park Sang-won	15
(China) Luo Shaotong	15
(Poland) Olaf Stasiak	6
(Hong Kong) Aaron Ho	10
(France) Maxime Pianfetti	15

Round of 32
(Georgia (country)) Sandro Bazadze	15
(Germany) Philipp Methner	11
(Romania) Vlad Covaliu	15
(Japan) Mao Kokubo	14
(South Korea) Do Gyeong-dong	15
(South Korea) Park Sang-won	13
(China) Luo Shaotong	15
(France) Maxime Pianfetti	9

Round of 16
(Georgia (country)) Sandro Bazadze	15
(Romania) Vlad Covaliu	13
(South Korea) Do Gyeong-dong	15
(China) Luo Shaotong	10

Quarterfinals
(Georgia (country)) Sandro Bazadze	11
(South Korea) Do Gyeong-dong	15

==== Section 4 ====
Round of 64
(Hungary) Krisztián Rabb	11
(Egypt) Mohamed Amer	15
(Hungary) Bertalan Tóth	5
(South Korea) Hwang Hee-geun	15
(Iran) Ali Pakdaman	15
(Italy) Matteo Neri	13
(Poland) Benedykt Denkiewicz	8
(United States) William Morrill	15
(France) Rémi Garrigue	9
(Russia) Kamil Ibragimov	15
(Japan) Hayato Tsubo	15
(Romania) George Dragomir	8
(Turkey) Enes Kalender	8
(Hungary) Áron Szilágyi	15
(Georgia (country)) Giorgi Urushadze	5
(Egypt) Ahmed Hesham	15

Round of 32
(Egypt) Mohamed Amer	15
(South Korea) Hwang Hee-geun	12
(Iran) Ali Pakdaman	15
(United States) William Morrill	13
(Russia) Kamil Ibragimov	15
(Japan) Hayato Tsubo	13
(Hungary) Áron Szilágyi	15
(Egypt) Ahmed Hesham	14

Round of 16
(Egypt) Mohamed Amer	15
(Iran) Ali Pakdaman	6
(Russia) Kamil Ibragimov
(Hungary) Áron Szilágyi	w/o

Quarterfinals
(Egypt) Mohamed Amer	15
(Hungary) Áron Szilágyi	14
