= Fencing at the 2026 Asian Games =

- Venue: Aichi International Exhibition Center
- Dates: 22–27 September 2026
- Competitors: 309 from 28 nations

The fencing competitions at the 2026 Asian Games is being held between 22 and 27 September 2026 at the Aichi International Exhibition Center.

== Schedule ==
The schedule is as follows:

Q	Elimination and quarterfinals	F	Semi-finals and final medal matches

Date	22nd Tue		23rd Wed		24th Thu		25th Fri		26th Sat		27th Sun	
Event	M	A	M	A	M	A	M	A	M	A	M	A
Men's épée					Q	F						
Men's team épée											Q	F
Men's foil	Q	F										
Men's team foil							Q	F				
Men's sabre			Q	F								
Men's team sabre									Q	F		
Women's épée	Q	F										
Women's team épée							Q	F				
Women's foil			Q	F								
Women's team foil									Q	F		
Women's sabre					Q	F						
Women's team sabre											Q	F

== Medal summary ==
=== Medal table ===
* Host nation (Japan)

Rank	Nation	Gold	Silver	Bronze	Total
1	Japan*	6	2	4	12
2	South Korea	4	4	2	10
3	China	1	1	6	8
4	Kazakhstan	1	1	3	5
5	Hong Kong	0	2	4	6
6	Singapore	0	1	2	3
6	Uzbekistan	0	1	2	3
8	Iran	0	0	1	1
Totals (8 entries)		12	12	24	48

=== Medalists ===
==== Men's events ====
Event	Gold	Silver	Bronze
Individual épée	Koki Kano; Japan	Kirill Prokhodov; Kazakhstan	Fong Hoi Sun; Hong Kong
Individual épée	Koki Kano; Japan	Kirill Prokhodov; Kazakhstan	Masaru Yamada; Japan
Team épée	Kazakhstan; Ruslan Kurbanov; Kirill Prokhodov; Yerlik Sertay; Vadim Sharlaimov	South Korea; Jang Hyo-min; Kwon O-min; Nam Yeon-ho; Park Sang-young	Japan; Seiya Asami; Koki Kano; Ryu Matsumoto; Masaru Yamada
Team épée	Kazakhstan; Ruslan Kurbanov; Kirill Prokhodov; Yerlik Sertay; Vadim Sharlaimov	South Korea; Jang Hyo-min; Kwon O-min; Nam Yeon-ho; Park Sang-young	Hong Kong; Fong Hoi Sun; Ho Wai Hang; Lau Ho Fung; Ng Ho Tin
Individual foil	Kazuki Iimura; Japan	Ryan Choi; Hong Kong	Kyosuke Matsuyama; Japan
Individual foil	Kazuki Iimura; Japan	Ryan Choi; Hong Kong	Youn Jeong-hyun; South Korea
Team foil	Japan; Toshiya Saito; Kazuki Iimura; Kyosuke Matsuyama; Shunsuke Baba	Hong Kong; Cheung Ka Long; Ryan Choi; Harris Ho; Leung Chin Yu	China; Xu Jie; Lyu Weiqiao; Zeng Zhaoran
Team foil	Japan; Toshiya Saito; Kazuki Iimura; Kyosuke Matsuyama; Shunsuke Baba	Hong Kong; Cheung Ka Long; Ryan Choi; Harris Ho; Leung Chin Yu	South Korea; Im Cheol-woo; Youn Jeong-hyun; Lee Kwang-hyun; Kim Tae-hwan
Individual sabre	Oh Sang-uk; South Korea	Shen Chenpeng; China	Artyom Sarkissyan; Kazakhstan
Individual sabre	Oh Sang-uk; South Korea	Shen Chenpeng; China	Ali Pakdaman; Iran
Team sabre	South Korea; Do Gyeong-dong; Hwang Hee-geun; Oh Sang-uk; Park Sang-won	Japan; Mao Kokubo; Hayato Tsubo; Shido Tsumori; Kento Yoshida	Kazakhstan; Kuanysh Ergashbay; Artyom Sarkissyan; Nazarbay Sattarkhan; Nurmukhammed Zhailybay
Team sabre	South Korea; Do Gyeong-dong; Hwang Hee-geun; Oh Sang-uk; Park Sang-won	Japan; Mao Kokubo; Hayato Tsubo; Shido Tsumori; Kento Yoshida	Hong Kong; Royce Chan; Hugo Ho; Aaron Ho; Leung Tin Ching

==== Women's events ====
Event	Gold	Silver	Bronze
Individual épée	Song Se-ra; South Korea	Kiria Tikanah; Singapore	Tamaki Terayama; Japan
Individual épée	Song Se-ra; South Korea	Kiria Tikanah; Singapore	Yang Jingwen; China
Team épée	China; Tang Junyao; Yu Sihan; Liu Chang; Yang Jingwen	South Korea; Yang Seung-hye; Lim Tae-hee; Song Se-ra; Lee Hye-in	Singapore; Esther Tan; Kiria Tikanah; Elle Koh; Filzah Hadiyah Nor Anuar
Team épée	China; Tang Junyao; Yu Sihan; Liu Chang; Yang Jingwen	South Korea; Yang Seung-hye; Lim Tae-hee; Song Se-ra; Lee Hye-in	Kazakhstan; Irina Bakaldina; Sofiya Nikolaichuk; Daria Samodelkina; Vladislava Andreyeva
Individual foil	Yuka Ueno; Japan	Park Ji-hee; South Korea	Polina Volobueva; Uzbekistan
Individual foil	Yuka Ueno; Japan	Park Ji-hee; South Korea	Maxine Wong; Singapore
Team foil	Japan; Sera Azuma; Komaki Kikuchi; Sumire Tsuji; Yuka Ueno	South Korea; Lee Se-joo; Mo Byeo-li; Park Ji-hee; Sim So-eun	China; Fu Yingying; Huang Qianqian; Song Yue; Zhang Siqi
Team foil	Japan; Sera Azuma; Komaki Kikuchi; Sumire Tsuji; Yuka Ueno	South Korea; Lee Se-joo; Mo Byeo-li; Park Ji-hee; Sim So-eun	Hong Kong; Daphne Chan; Valerie Cheng; Janelle Leung; Sophia Wu
Individual sabre	Misaki Emura; Japan	Zaynab Dayibekova; Uzbekistan	Pan Qimiao; China
Individual sabre	Misaki Emura; Japan	Zaynab Dayibekova; Uzbekistan	Rao Xueyi; China
Team sabre	South Korea; Choi Se-bin; Jeon Ha-young; Kim Jeong-mi; Seo Ji-yeon	Japan; Misaki Emura; Yuina Kaneko; Seri Ozaki; Yui Sano	China; Pan Qimiao; Rao Xueyi; Wei Jiayi; Zhang Xinyi
Team sabre	South Korea; Choi Se-bin; Jeon Ha-young; Kim Jeong-mi; Seo Ji-yeon	Japan; Misaki Emura; Yuina Kaneko; Seri Ozaki; Yui Sano	Uzbekistan; Zaynab Dayibekova; Fernanda Herrera; Gulistan Perdebaeva; Samira Shokirova

== Participating nations ==
- Bangladesh (3)
- China (24)
- Chinese Taipei (8)
- Hong Kong (24)
- India (20)
- Indonesia (7)
- Iran (5)
- Japan (24)
- Jordan (3)
- Kazakhstan (22)
- Kuwait (9)
- Kyrgyzstan (5)
- Laos (1)
- Lebanon (3)
- Macau (8)
- Mongolia (9)
- Oman (7)
- Pakistan (5)
- Philippines (12)
- Qatar (9)
- Saudi Arabia (8)
- Singapore (20)
- South Korea (24)
- Tajikistan (1)
- Thailand (10)
- United Arab Emirates (9)
- Uzbekistan (19)
- Vietnam (10)
