= Kabaddi in China =

Kabaddi is a minor sport in China. It is said to be most popular in the town of Guali, where China's first National Kabaddi Championship took place in 2023. The sport first started to grow in China after its inclusion in the 1990 Asian Games in Beijing, and it has been popular among spectators in subsequent appearances in China-hosted editions of the Asian Games. In Hong Kong, kabaddi has been promoted in order to create greater integration among different ethnic groups in the city.

== See also ==
- Kabaddi in South Korea
