= Pavel Graudyn =

Romanian fencer (born 2006)

Personal information
- Born: 19 November 2006 (age 19) Moscow, Russia

Fencing career
- Sport: Fencing
- Country: Russia
- Weapon: Sabre
- Hand: Right-handed
Medal record
Men's sabre
Representing Russia
World Championships
| Gold medal – first place | 2026 Hong Kong | Individual |
Representing Individual Neutral Athletes
European Championships
| Bronze medal – third place | 2025 Genoa | Team |

Pavel Vladimirovich Graudyn (Russian: Павел Владимирович Граудынь; born 19 November 2006) is a Russian right-handed sabre fencer. He won a gold medal in the individual sabre at the 2026 World Fencing Championships.

== Career ==
In June 2025, Graudyn competed at the 2025 European Fencing Championships and won a bronze medal in the team sabre event. The next month he competed at the 2025 World Fencing Championships in the individual sabre event and advanced to the round of 16.

In July 2026 he competed at the 2026 World Fencing Championships and won a gold medal in the individual sabre event. During the final he defeated 2024 Summer Olympics gold medalist Do Gyeong-dong. This was Russia's first gold medal at the World Fencing Championships since the reinstatement of the national flag and anthem, after the International Fencing Federation (FIE) lifted all restrictions on Russian athletes on 2 June 2026.
