= Sport in South Korea =

South Korea has traditional sports of its own, as well as sports imported from other cultures and countries. Football and baseball have traditionally been regarded as the most popular sports in Korea. A 2021 poll showed that 25% of South Korean sports fans identified football as their favourite sport, with baseball ranked 2nd at 18.8% of respondents.

== Korean traditional sports ==
=== Korean martial arts ===
==== Taekwondo ====
Taekwondo, a popular martial art, is said to have historical origins on the Korean peninsula as far back as the 1st century BCE. The sport rose to prominence following the end of Japanese occupation with the end of World War II. Formalized rules were established in 1961 and in 1988 the sport became an Olympic event. The name "Taekwondo" literally means way of foot and fist, although the modern sport emphasises kicking.

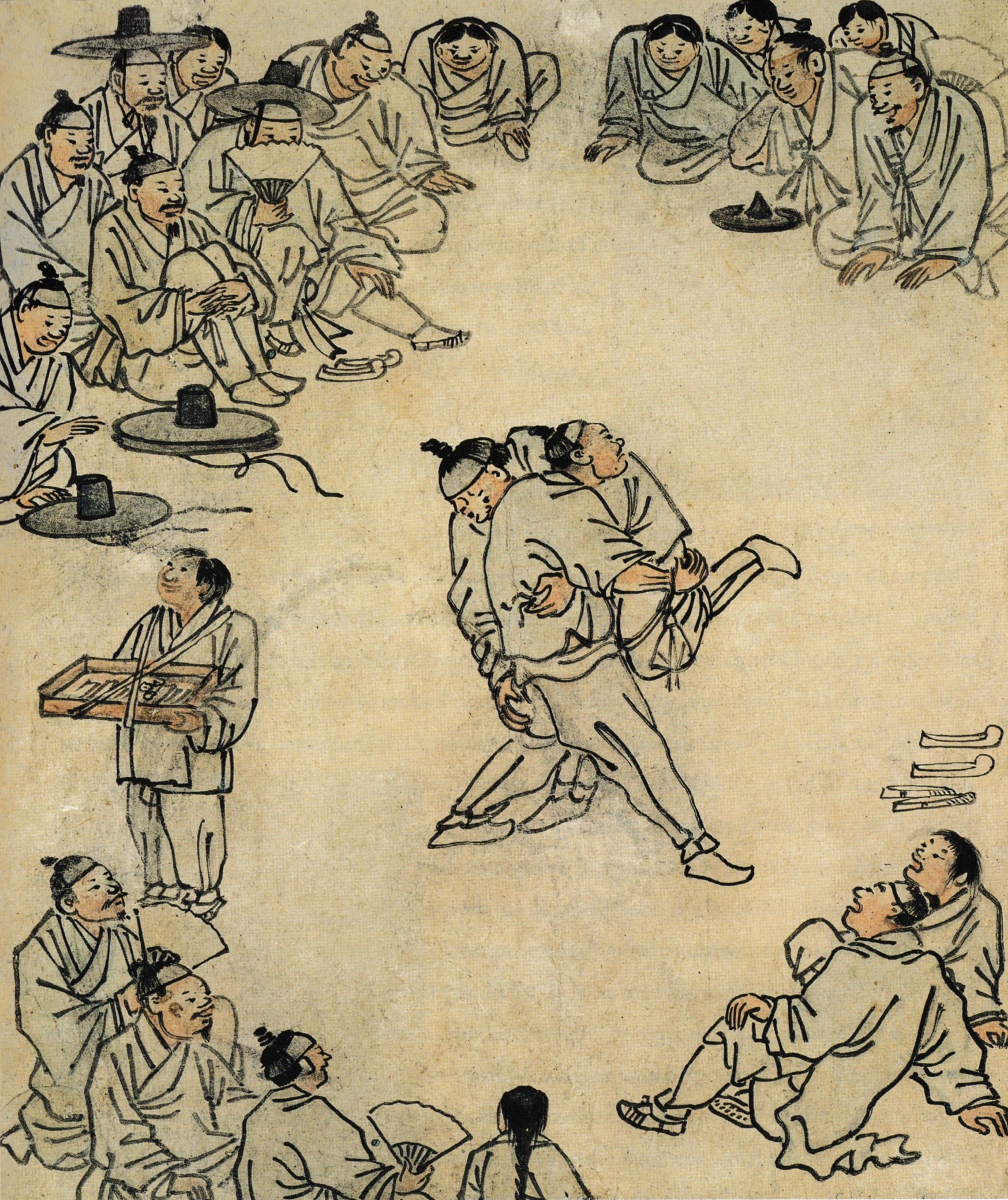
Ssireum

==== Ssireum ====
Ssireum wrestling is enlisted on UNESCO Intangible Cultural Heritage Lists and one of popular sport in South Korea. Ssireum is originated in agricultural society of Korea to celebrate Dano, Chuseok and Seolnal. Korea Ssireum Association is a governing body of Ssireum.

Kang Ho-dong and Lee Man-ki are famous Ssireum Wrestlers. Korean Ssireum Wrestlers are registered in Korea Ssireum Association and most of them are trained from Primary School to University Level.

==== Other martial arts ====
Although there is much controversy regarding the historical origins of many martial disciplines in South Korea, there is little question that, Koreanized or traditional in origin, Korean martial arts and sports have enjoyed considerable success. Styles such as Hapkido, Kuk Sool, Hwarangdo, Han Moo Do, Yudo, Kumdo, Goog-sool, and many others arose quickly out of an independent Korea and have spread to countries around the world. Although they are not as popular as Taekwondo, they each uniquely represent the Korean martial spirit which dates back to antiquity. Unlike Japanese martial arts which often use "-do" at a name's end (meaning "way"), traditional Korean martial arts were called "Mu Sool" or "Mu Yea". This could lead to some confusion since although the "do" in Taekwondo and Hapkido means "way" (as in Karate-do and Aikido), the historical meaning in Hwarangdo is different from the modern usage (also "way" like the others). When that martial art was invented in the 1960s, the name was borrowed from an ancient group (do) consisting mainly of the children of the gentry class (yangban) for learning military tactics, leadership, and fighting skills.

== Other competitive sports ==
=== Team sports ===
==== Baseball ====
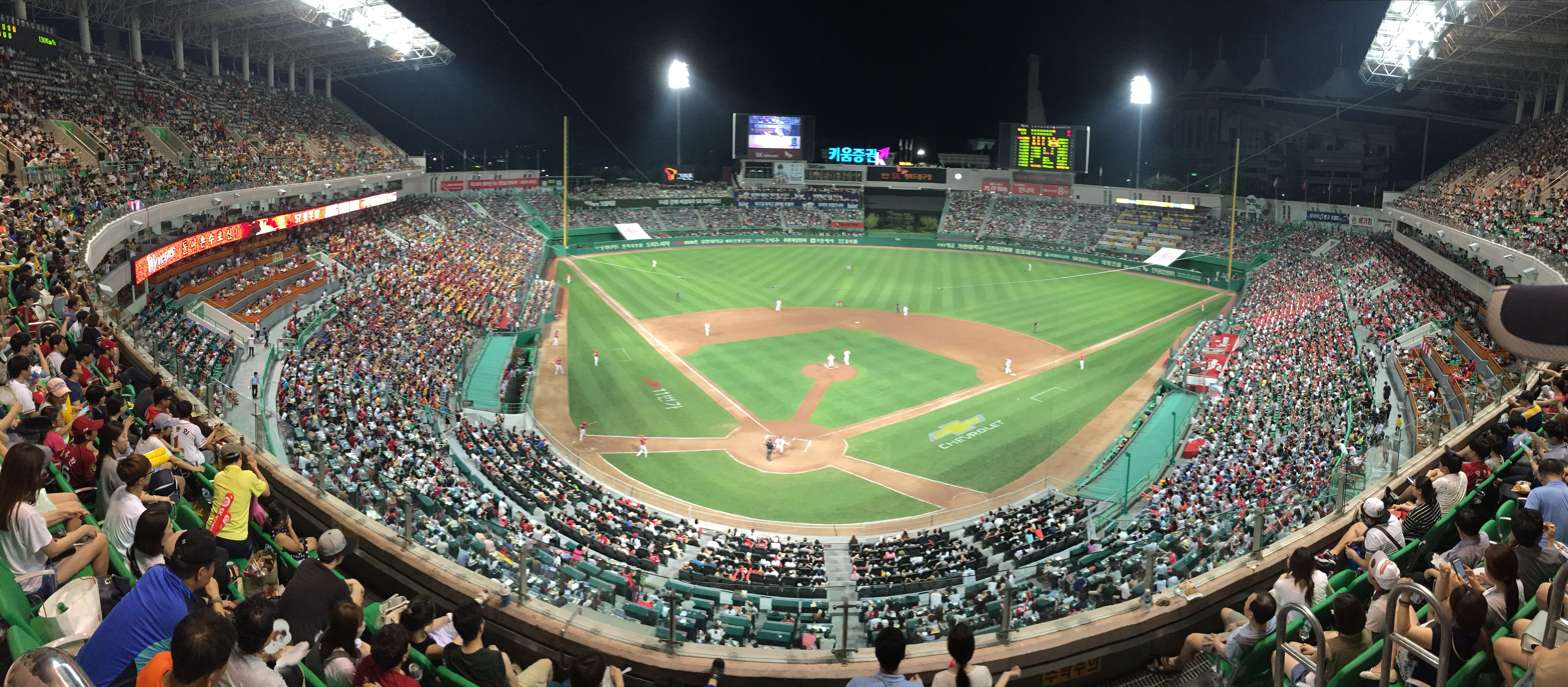
Incheon Munhak Baseball Stadium

Baseball was first introduced to Korea by American missionaries in the late 19th century. The American missionaries' goal was to use baseball to spread muscular Christianity. South Korea's professional baseball league, the KBO League started in 1982 with six teams and has since expanded to include ten teams. Korea won the Gold Medal in baseball at the 2008 Olympic Games. Korea is also a regular participant in the World Baseball Classic, finishing as runners-up in 2009 and in 3rd place in 2006. The domestic KBO League consistently draws 8 million total fans per year, averaging approximately 11,500 spectators per game, both highest among professional spectator sports in South Korea. There is also an active baseball cheering culture in South Korea, with each team having its own method of cheering. Several Korean players have gone on to play in Major League Baseball.

==== Association football ====
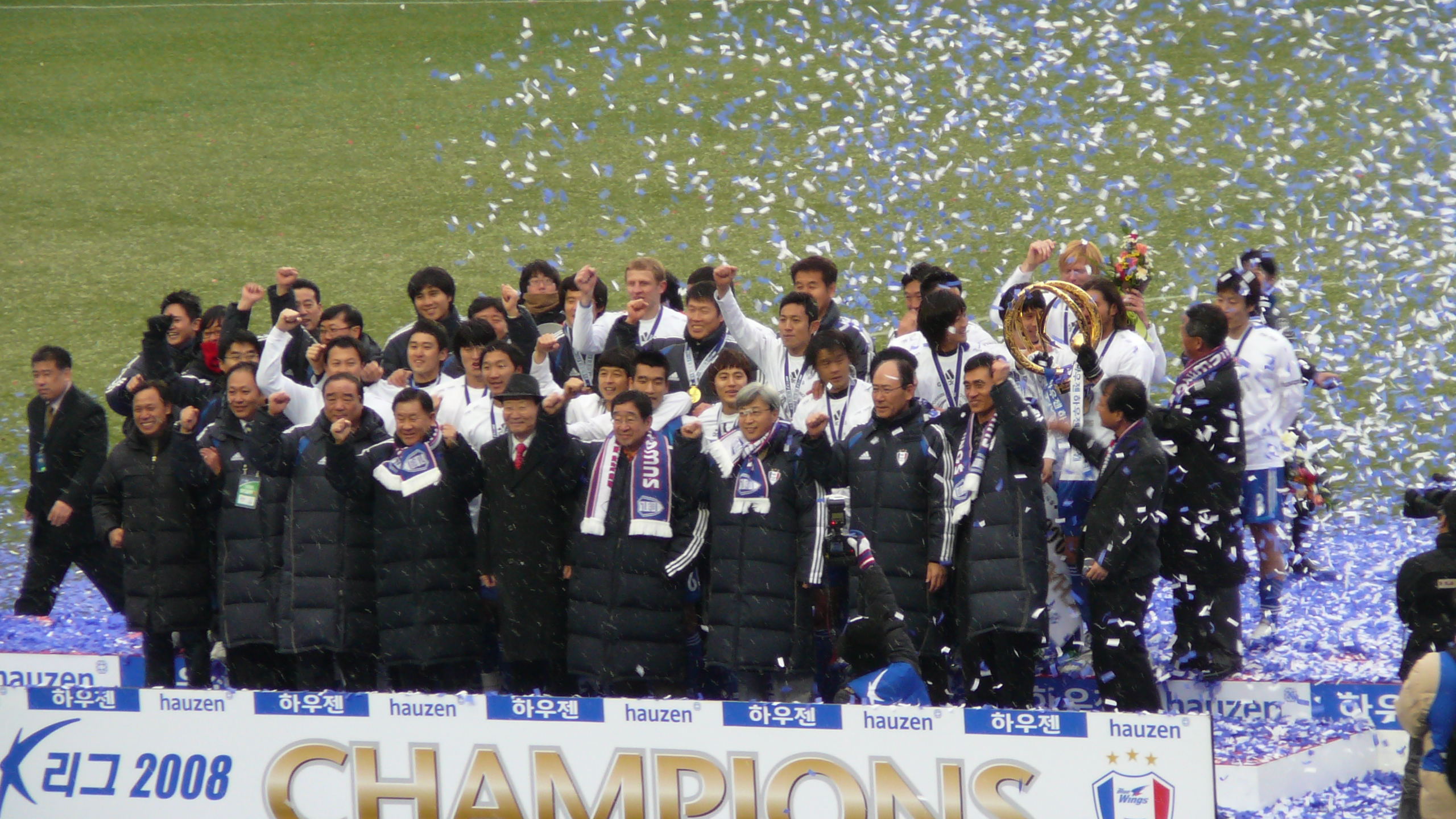
2008 K-League Winner, Suwon Samsung Bluewings

Football became popular in Korea in the early 1900s. At the time there was a major football rivalry between Pyongyang and Seoul. The Joseon Football Association was established in 1928 in order to develop the sport domestically, but was banned ten years later by the Japanese colonial government. Following the liberation of the Korea and the establishment of South Korea, the Korea Football Association (KFA) was founded in 1948.

The national football team became the first team in the Asian Football Confederation (AFC) to reach the FIFA World Cup semi-finals in the 2002 FIFA World Cup, which South Korea jointly hosted with Japan. The Korea National Football Team (as it is known) has qualified for every World Cup since Mexico 1986, and has broken out of the group stage thrice: first in 2002, then in 2010, when it was defeated by eventual semi-finalist Uruguay in the Round of 16, and in 2022, where it was defeated by eventual quarter-finalist Brazil. At the 2012 Summer Olympics, South Korea's U-23 team won the bronze medal in men's football.

South Korea, which competes internationally under the name of "Korea Republic", has qualified for twelve FIFA World Cups including the most recent 2026 tournament (Asian record), and co-hosted the 2002 World Cup, finishing in 4th place. Also in 2010, the country's under-17 women's team won the 2010 FIFA U-17 Women's World Cup in Trinidad and Tobago, claiming South Korea's first-ever title in worldwide FIFA competition.

The K League, established in 1983, is the oldest domestic professional football league in Asia. Since its foundation the league has expanded to two professional divisions, K League 1 and K League 2. There are also two semi-professional divisions and the KFA has announced plans to restructure Korean men's football into a unified pyramid by 2027.

The Korea Women's Football Federation was established in 2001 and launched the WK League in 2009 with six semi-professional teams. The league has since expanded to eight teams and the KWFF has announced plans to fully professionalise the league by 2035.

==== Basketball ====
Professional basketball teams compete in the Korean Basketball League and Women's Korean Basketball League. The South Korea national basketball team won a record number of 25 medals at the Asian Basketball Championship. The only Korean NBA player to date has been Ha Seung-Jin, who played there from 2004 to 2006. Basketball was the most popular sport in South Korea in the 1990s, along with Baseball but its popularity has declined since the 2000s. In a 2022 ESPN story on Lee Hyun-jung, at the time starring in NCAA Division I basketball at Davidson College, a writer for Korean basketball magazine Jumpball commented, "In terms of popularity in Korea, if baseball and soccer are like BTS, then basketball is like '90s hair metal."

==== Volleyball ====
Volleyball is very popular in South Korea. The professional V-League, which comprises both men's and women's competitions, was launched in 2005.

==== Field hockey ====
South Korea have achieved success on the continental level in field hockey. The country's achievements include:

- Asian Games (Men's):- South Korea has had a significant record in Asian Games, having finished 8 times on the podium of which they won the Gold Medal on 4 occasions.
- Asian Games (Women's):- Just like in Men's Competition, South Korea have excelled in the women's tournament having won 5 Gold medals and 4 Silver medals.
- Asia Cup(Men's):- South Korea are the best team in Asia Cup having won the competition 5 times and achieving the podium 9 times in total.
- Asia Cup(Women's):- Just like in Men's Competition, South Korea are the best team in Asia Cup having won the competition 3 times and achieving the podium 9 times in total.
- Asian Champions Trophy(Men's):- South Korea have won the Asian Champions Trophy once in 2021 and finished fourth twice.
- Asian Champions Trophy(Women's):- South Korea have won the Asian Champions Trophy thrice and finished on the podium 4 times in total and thus are the most successful team.

==== Lacrosse ====
Lacrosse in South Korea is governed by the Korea Lacrosse Association. In 2023, the Korea Lacrosse Association established a domestic Lacrosse sixes League.

South Korea has sent national teams to the Under-19 World Lacrosse Championships. The 2025 World Lacrosse Men's U20 Championship was held in Seogwipo, South Korea.

==== Handball ====
Handball in South Korea is governed by the Korea Handball Federation. The semi-professional H League, which comprises both men's and women's competitions, was established in 2011.

The South Korea women's national handball team was the first non-European country to win the World Championship when they beat Hungary in the final in 1995. The team has won Olympic gold twice, in 1988 and 1992. They also won silver in 1996 and 2004, and bronze at Beijing 2008, making handball South Korea's most successful Olympic team sport. South Korea have also won gold in the women's competition at the Asian Games seven times.

==== Ice hockey ====
Ice hockey is slowly emerging as a sport in South Korea. HL Anyang became the first non-Japanese club to win the Asia League Ice Hockey championship title. South Korea has four teams participating in the Asia League Ice Hockey championship.

==== Kabaddi ====
The South Korea national kabaddi team is ranked 3rd in the world. Korea's captain Jang Kun Lee is considered one of the best international players in India's Pro Kabaddi League, where he currently plays for the Bengal Warriors.

At the 2016 Kabaddi World Cup, Korea finished in 3rd place after losing to Iran in the semi-finals. Korea was the only team to beat the eventual winners and world champions, India, in the tournament. Korea was also invited to participate in the 2018 Dubai Kabaddi Masters as one of the top four kabaddi-playing nations in the world.

==== Esports ====
Esports have found a strong home in South Korea, StarCraft professional competition being the largest example of these. Major corporate sponsored teams and leagues have formed in esports, the most notable leagues being the OnGameNet Starleague, the MBCGame StarCraft League (retired), and Proleague. Some television stations are devoted to broadcasting electronic sports, such as Ongamenet, GomTV, and formerly MBCGame. The Korean e-Sports Association, an arm of the Ministry of Culture, Sports and Tourism, was founded in 2000 to promote and regulate esports in the country.

=== Individual sports ===
==== Archery ====
South Korea has dominated archery at the international level. As well as consistently strong performances in other international competitions, South Korea has achieved success in archery at the Olympic Games with South Korea winning the women's teams event in the Olympics 10 consecutive times since the event was introduced in 1988.

==== Fencing ====
In recent years, South Korea has performed well in fencing, winning many medals from recent Olympic Games and World Championships. Gu Bon-gil, Oh Eun-seok and Do Gyeong-dong are Sabre fencer who graduated Osung Middle School or Osung High School in Daegu, Gyeongbuk and taught by Lee Seung-yong.

==== Golf ====
Golf is very popular in South Korea. It is often thought that this is linked to the fact that golf is considered a status symbol. Membership in golf clubs in South Korea is considerably more expensive than in Japan or the US.

Yang Yong-eun won the 2009 PGA Championship, the first Asian player to win a men's major tournament. K. J. Choi won eight PGA Tour events, including the 2011 Players Championship, and also claimed two top 5s at the Masters Tournament. Yang and Choi were selected for the Presidents Cup international team multiple times.

South Korea is especially strong in women's golf; 47 Koreans play on the world's leading women's tour, the LPGA Tour. Notable players include Pak Se-ri, who won five major tournaments from 1998 to 2006 and 25 LPGA Tour events; Inbee Park, who has won seven major tournaments since 2008 and 21 LPGA Tour events; and Jiyai Shin, Ryu So-yeon, Chun In-gee, Park Sung-hyun and Ko Jin-young, who have won two major tournaments each.

The two professional tours are the Korean Tour for men and the LPGA of Korea Tour for women.

==== Ice skating ====
Ice skating is also a very popular sport which sees kids as young as five years old starting to compete and getting private coaching on a daily basis. National leadership deliberately focused on short-track speed skating as an area of focus to do well in the Olympics and thus encouraged a culture of skating. The sport was first introduced to the country in 1982 by a Japanese university team who competed in an exhibition event, and the South Korean national team was established three years later, in time for the 1986 Asian Winter Games. By the first half of the 1990s they had become a major power in the sport, with Kim Ki-hoon becoming the country's first Winter Olympic gold medalist at the 1992 Winter Games in the men's 1000 metres, and the team winning five golds and a silver at the 1994 Winter Olympics.

==== Table tennis ====
Table tennis enjoys significant popularity in South Korea, supported by both professional and grassroots infrastructure. The Korea Table Tennis League (KTTL), founded in 2022, is one of the most competitive table tennis leagues in the world, featuring stars such as Jang Woo-jin, Lee Sang-su, and An Jae-hyun. with teams including Mirae Asset Securities, Korea Armed Forces Athletic Corps, Hwaseong Urban Development Corporation, and SeAH competing at the highest domestic level. The Korea Table Tennis Association (KTTA) serves as the governing body for the sport, organizing competitions and events within the country and selecting and training the national team. South Korea hosts the Korea Open, an annual tournament organized by the KTTA under the authority of the International Table Tennis Federation, which is currently one of six top-tier Platinum events on the ITTF World Tour.

At the grassroots level, the sport benefits from extensive training facilities and participation across various levels of competition. Numerous local clubs operate 10–12 hours daily, allowing players to train extensively. University-level competition exists, with institutions like Seoul National University holding sports festivals that include table tennis competitions, featuring approximately 50 departmental teams from across the college's departments.

==== Motorsport ====
South Korea hosted the annual Formula One Korean Grand Prix in Yeongam from 2010 until 2013. However, South Korea has yet to have a driver on the grid.

On 30 November 2018, Formula E CEO, Alejandro Agag signed an agreement with Moon Jae-sik, chairman of JSM Holdings. South Korea was given the right to hold the Seoul ePrix from 2020 to 2025. It will be first ePrix in South Korea and fourth Asian country hosting after Hong Kong, Malaysia and China (Beijing and Sanya).

==== Other sports ====
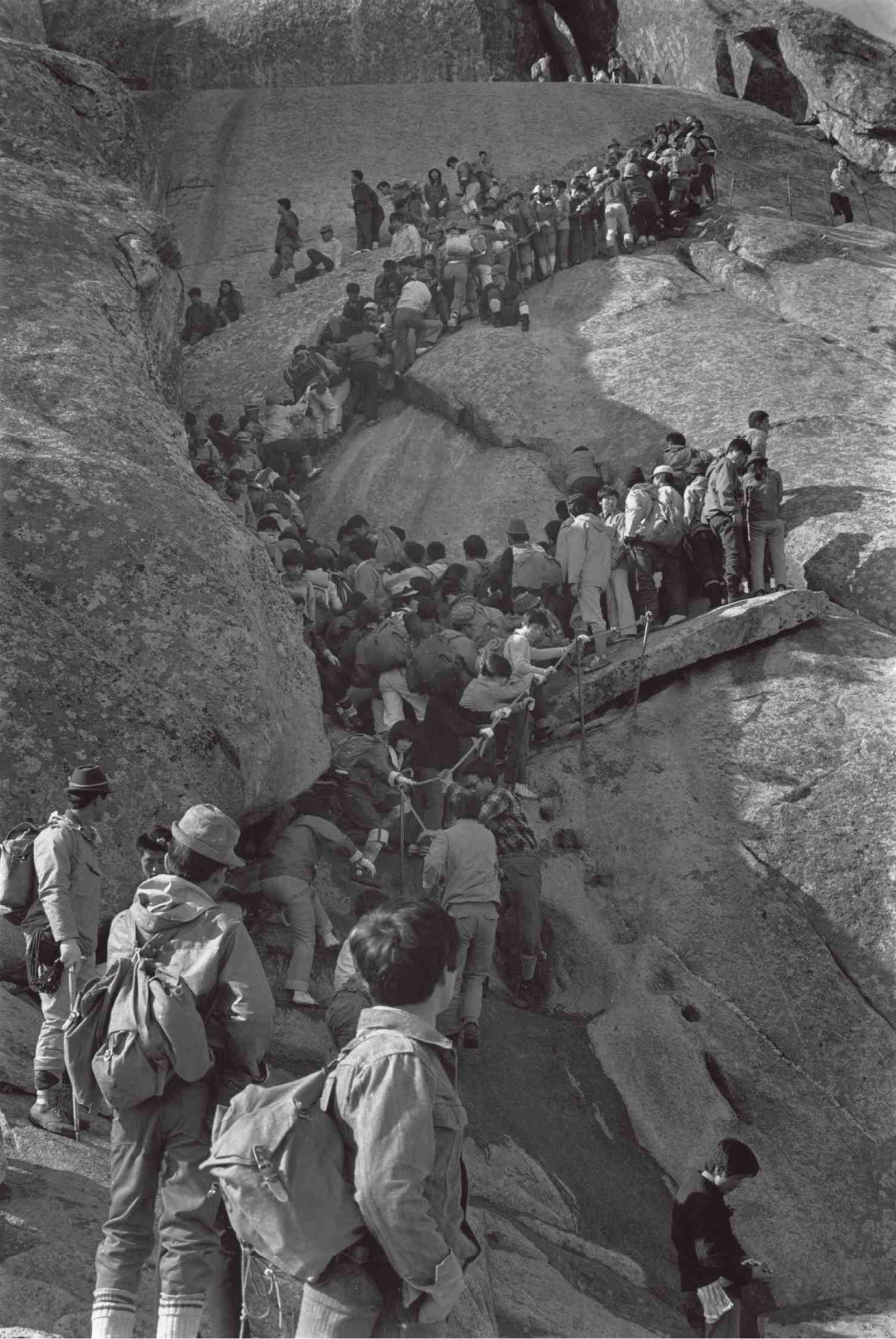
Hiking on Bukhansan (1972)

Popular throughout Asia, Badminton is played by many Koreans. Badminton nets can be found in many outdoor recreation parks. Korean players often reach the finals in regional and world championships. Bowling is a popular sport in South Korea, with many local leagues. Computerized systems are commonplace.

== Leisure sports ==
70 per cent of South Korea is mountainous and hiking is very popular, particularly among older generations. Hiking is a massive industry for clothing companies and tourism. South Korea's hiking infrastructure, and the close proximity of hiking trails to urban centres, has also made the pastime popular with travellers.

Skiing for transport and leisure began to gain popularity in the early twentieth century during the Japanese occupation of Korea. In recent years, Korea's alpine skiing slopes have received global attention thanks to the 2018 Winter Olympics and 2024 Winter Youth Olympics, both of which took place in Gangwon province. Ski resorts struggling in the face of climate change have begun marketing more towards foreign tourists, as well as asking the government for financial support.

Fishing is a popular leisure activity in South Korea. It is considered a relatively accessible activity as a license is not required to fish in public water, although the introduction of a licensing system has been proposed by the Ministry of Oceans and Fisheries. There are several popular regional fishing festivals including the world-famous Hwacheon Sancheoneo Ice Festival.

Scuba diving is popular, particularly on Jeju island.

== Major sport events ==
=== Olympic Games ===
Seoul Olympic Stadium built for the 1988 Summer Olympics.

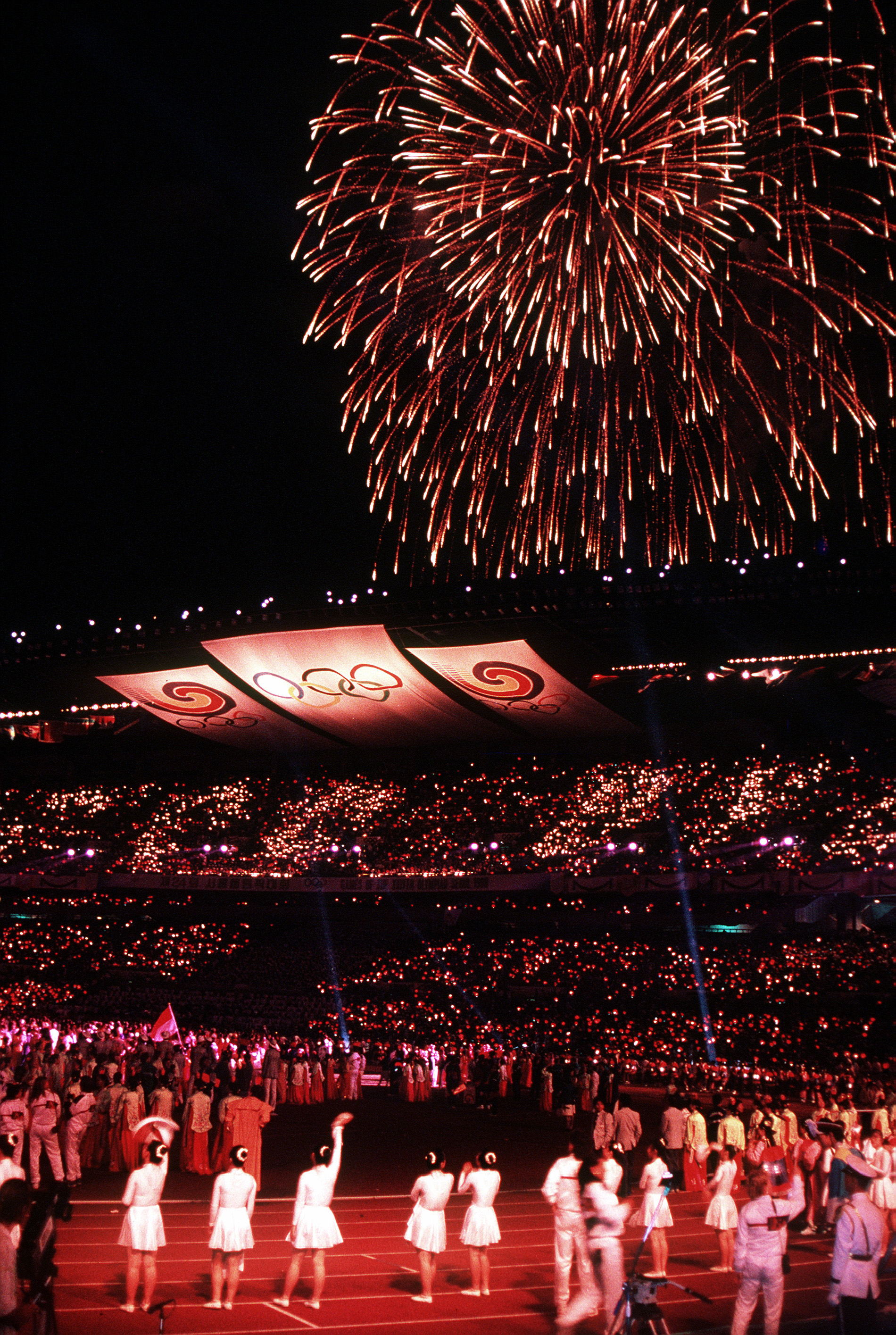
Fireworks at the closing ceremonies of the 1988 Summer Olympics in Seoul

The 1988 Summer Olympics were celebrated in Seoul from September 17 to October 2, 1988. They were the second Summer Olympic Games to be held in Asia, last hosted in Tokyo in 1964.

At the Seoul Games, 160 nations were represented by 8391 athletes: 6197 men and 2194 women. 237 events were held. 27221 volunteers helped to prepare the Olympics. 11331 media (4978 written press and 6353 broadcasters) showed the Games all over the world.

These were the last Olympic Games for two of the world's "dominating" sport powers, Soviet Union and East Germany, as both ceased to exist by the next Olympic Games.

North Korea, still officially at war with South Korea, and its allies, Albania, Cuba, Madagascar and Seychelles boycotted the games. For differing reasons, Ethiopia, Nicaragua, and Albania (who declared an Olympic-record fourth consecutive boycott) did not participate in the Games. However, the much larger boycotts seen in the previous three Summer Olympics were avoided, resulting in the largest ever number of participating nations to that date.

North Korea and South Korea marched together in the 2000 and 2004 Olympics, and were thought likely to do so in 2008, however they did not. (See Sports in North Korea.)

South Korea has the distinction amongst Asian countries of collecting more Winter Olympics medals with 45 medals: 23 gold, 14 silver, and 8 bronze. South Korea ranked second in the 2016 Winter Youth Olympics medal table with ten gold medals. But, if they lost the title they followed up with a silver medal.

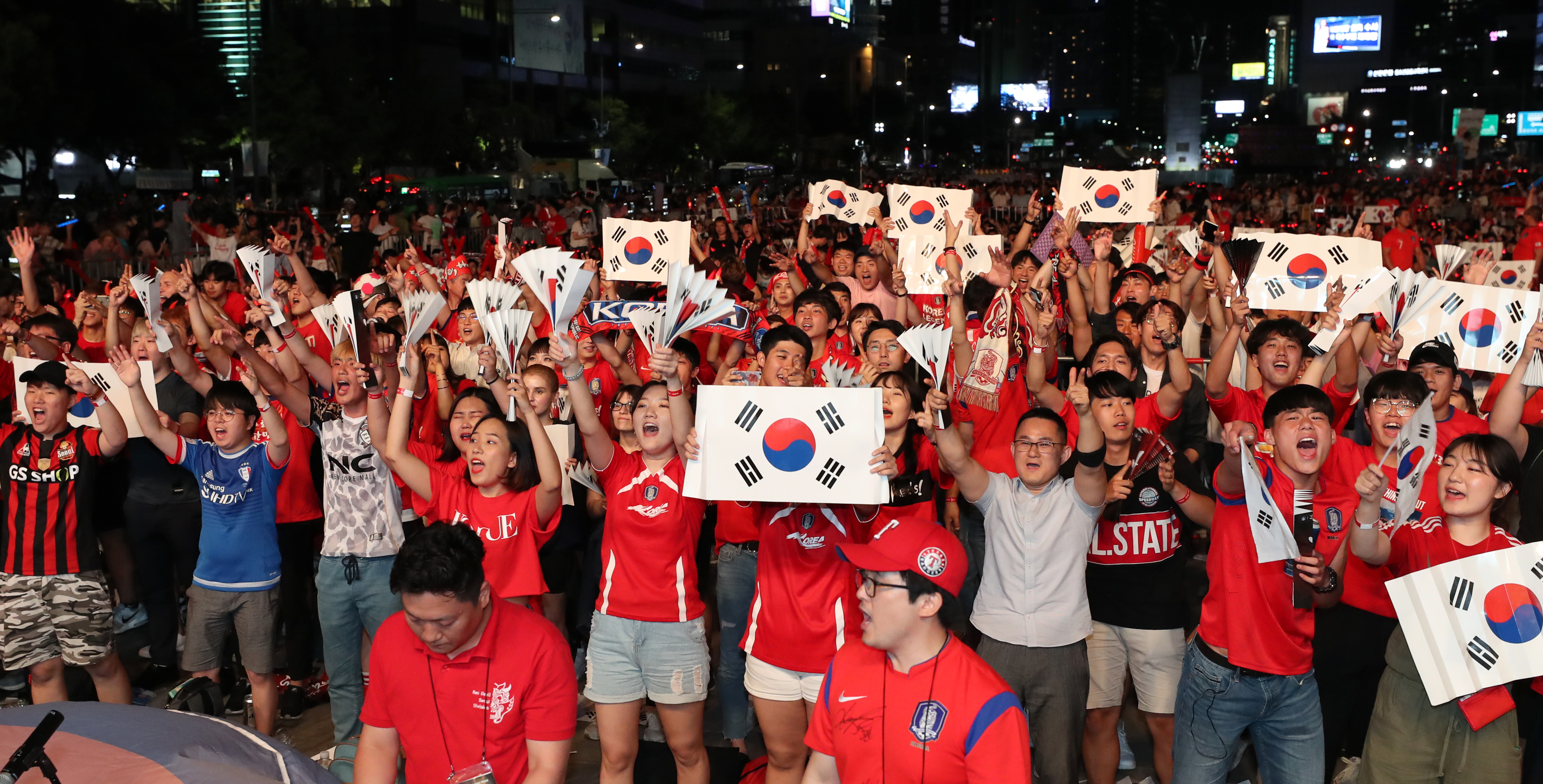
South Korean fans, the "Red Devils", watch the 2018 World Cup match

The 2018 Winter Olympics took place in Pyeongchang between 9 and 25 February 2018. Pyeongchang won on its third consecutive bid. After a series of large cities (Nagano to Sochi), for the first time since Lillehammer 1994 the Winter Olympics returned to a mountain resort. South Korea also hosted the 2024 Winter Youth Olympics.

=== FIFA World Cup ===
The 2002 FIFA World Cup was jointly hosted by South Korea and Japan. More than 10 million Koreans took to the streets to support their team in the semifinals against Germany.

== Notes ==
- "Kite Flying as a Sport". Britannica Student Encyclopedia (Online ed.). 2005.
- "Sport".
- "Korea: Education, Recreation, and Welfare". Britannica Student Encyclopedia (Online ed.). 2005.
- "Traditional Sports and Games".
- Korean Folk Village (2000). Korean Traditional Culture: Scents of Korean Traditional Culture. Lee Sang-So. ISBN 978-89-951216-2-7.
- "Martial art: Taekwondo". Encyclopædia Britannica (Online ed.). 2005.
- "Seoul 1988". www.olympic.org.
