= Fencing at the 2026 Asian Games – Men's individual sabre =

Men's individual sabre at the 2026 Asian Games
- Venue: Aichi Sky Expo Hall F
- Date: 23 September 2026
- Competitors: 29 from 17 nations

Medalists
gold medal	Oh Sang-uk	South Korea
silver medal	Shen Chenpeng	China
bronze medal	Ali Pakdaman	Iran
bronze medal	Artyom Sarkissyan	Kazakhstan

The men's individual sabre competition at the 2026 Asian Games in Nagoya was held on 23 September 2026 at the Aichi Sky Expo Hall F. South Korea's Oh Sang-uk defeated Shen Chenpeng of China 15–13 in the final to win the gold medal.

== Schedule ==
All times are Japan Standard Time (UTC+09:00)

Date	Time	Event
Wednesday, 23 September 2026	11:45	Round of pools
Wednesday, 23 September 2026	13:20	Table of 32
Wednesday, 23 September 2026	14:00	Table of 16
Wednesday, 23 September 2026	14:50	Quarterfinals
Wednesday, 23 September 2026	17:00	Semifinals
Wednesday, 23 September 2026	18:00	Gold medal bout

== Results ==
=== Round of pools ===
==== Pool 1 ====
Athlete	KAZ	KSA	KOR	PHI	UAE	UZB
Artyom Sarkissyan (KAZ)	—	4–5	5–4	5–2	5–0	5–4
Adel Al-Mutairi (KSA)	5–4	—	1–5	1–5	5–2	3–5
Do Gyeong-dong (KOR)	4–5	5–1	—	5–3	5–1	5–4
Christian Jhester Concepcion (PHI)	2–5	5–1	3–5	—	5–3	5–4
Ahmed Alhammadi (UAE)	0–5	2–5	1–5	3–5	—	0–5
Musa Aymuratov (UZB)	4–5	5–3	4–5	4–5	5–0	—

Legend: Blue = left column team win; Red = top row team win.

==== Pool 2 ====
Athlete	IRI	LAO	KUW	UZB	KOR	HKG
Mohammad Fotouhi Firozabad (IRI)	—	5–1	4–5	5–2	5–3	5–4
Quentin Saysana Geoffroy (LAO)	1–5	—	5–1	1–5	5–4	2–5
Amaar Alammari (KUW)	5–4	1–5	—	5–3	1–5	5–4
Islambek Abdazov (UZB)	2–5	5–1	3–5	—	1–5	5–0
Oh Sang-uk (KOR)	3–5	4–5	5–1	5–1	—	5–4
Ho Pak Lam Hugo (HKG)	4–5	5–2	4–5	0–5	4–5	—

Legend: Blue = left column team win; Red = top row team win.

==== Pool 3 ====
Athlete	VIE	JPN	KAZ	IND	HKG	KSA
Nguyễn Văn Quyết (VIE)	—	3–5	5–4	3–5	3–5	3–5
Mao Kokubo (JPN)	5–3	—	5–1	5–2	2–5	5–2
Nurmukhammed Zhailybay (KAZ)	4–5	1–5	—	3–5	2–5	5–1
Gisho Nidhi Kumaresan Padma (IND)	5–3	2–5	5–3	—	3–5	5–3
Chan Lok Hei Royce (HKG)	5–3	5–2	5–2	5–3	—	5–3
Fayadh Alobaid (KSA)	5–3	2–5	1–5	3–5	3–5	—

Legend: Blue = left column team win; Red = top row team win.

==== Pool 4 ====
Athlete	KUW	CHN	PAK	IRI	VIE	PHI
Mohammad Abdulkareem (KUW)	—	5–4	5–0	5–1	3–5	3–5
Luo Shaotong (CHN)	4–5	—	5–0	1–5	5–3	5–2
Muhammad Nauman Ejaz (PAK)	0–5	0–5	—	0–5	1–5	1–5
Ali Pakdaman (IRI)	1–5	5–1	5–0	—	5–4	5–0
Nguyễn Xuân Lợi (VIE)	5–3	3–5	5–1	4–5	—	3–5
Eunice Daniel Villanueva (PHI)	5–3	2–5	5–1	0–5	5–3	—

Legend: Blue = left column team win; Red = top row team win.

==== Pool 5 ====
Athlete	IND	THA	JPN	JOR	CHN
Karan Singh (IND)	—	2–5	3–5	5–2	1–5
Voragun Srinualnad (THA)	5–2	—	5–4	5–4	5–3
Shido Tsumori (JPN)	5–3	4–5	—	4–5	5–4
Abdallah Tahla (JOR)	2–5	4–5	5–4	—	2–5
Shen Chenpeng (CHN)	5–1	3–5	4–5	5–2	—

Legend: Blue = left column team win; Red = top row team win.

==== Summary ====
Rank	Pool	Athlete	W	L	W/M	TD	TF
1	3	Chan Lok Hei Royce (HKG)	5	0	1.000	+12	25
2	5	Voragun Srinualnad (THA)	4	0	1.000	+7	20
3	4	Ali Pakdaman (IRI)	4	1	0.800	+11	21
4	1	Do Gyeong-dong (KOR)	4	1	0.800	+10	24
5	2	Mohammad Fotouhi Firozabad (IRI)	4	1	0.800	+9	24
5	1	Artyom Sarkissyan (KAZ)	4	1	0.800	+9	24
7	3	Mao Kokubo (JPN)	4	1	0.800	+9	22
8	2	Oh Sang-uk (KOR)	3	2	0.600	+6	22
9	4	Mohammad Abdulkareem (KUW)	3	2	0.600	+6	21
10	4	Luo Shaotong (CHN)	3	2	0.600	+5	20
11	1	Christian Jhester Concepcion (PHI)	3	2	0.600	+2	20
12	3	Gisho Nidhi Kumaresan Padma (IND)	3	2	0.600	+1	20
13	4	Eunice Daniel Villanueva (PHI)	3	2	0.600	+0	17
14	2	Amaar Alammari (KUW)	3	2	0.600	−4	17
15	5	Shen Chenpeng (CHN)	2	2	0.500	+4	17
16	5	Shido Tsumori (JPN)	2	2	0.500	+1	18
17	1	Musa Aymuratov (UZB)	2	3	0.400	+4	22
18	4	Nguyễn Xuân Lợi (VIE)	2	3	0.400	+1	20
19	2	Islambek Abdazov (UZB)	2	3	0.400	+0	16
20	1	Adel Al-Mutairi (KSA)	2	3	0.400	−6	15
21	2	Quentin Saysana Geoffroy (LAO)	2	3	0.400	−6	14
22	5	Abdallah Tahla (JOR)	1	3	0.250	−6	13
23	5	Karan Singh (IND)	1	3	0.250	−6	11
24	2	Ho Pak Lam Hugo (HKG)	1	4	0.200	−5	17
25	3	Nurmukhammed Zhailybay (KAZ)	1	4	0.200	−6	15
26	3	Nguyễn Văn Quyết (VIE)	1	4	0.200	−7	17
27	3	Fayadh Alobaid (KSA)	1	4	0.200	−9	14
28	1	Ahmed Alhammadi (UAE)	0	5	0.000	−19	6
29	4	Muhammad Nauman Ejaz (PAK)	0	5	0.000	−23	2

=== Knockout round ===
==== Final ====
Gold medal bout
8	Oh Sang-uk (KOR)	15
15	Shen Chenpeng (CHN)	13

==== Top half ====
Table of 32
17	Musa Aymuratov (UZB)	15
16	Shido Tsumori (JPN)	5
9	Mohammad Abdulkareem (KUW)	10
24	Ho Pak Lam Hugo (HKG)	15
21	Quentin Saysana Geoffroy (LAO)	8
12	Gisho Nidhi Kumaresan Padma (IND)	15
13	Eunice Daniel Villanueva (PHI)	9
20	Adel Al-Mutairi (KSA)	15

Table of 16
1	Chan Lok Hei Royce (HKG)	15
17	Musa Aymuratov (UZB)	14
24	Ho Pak Lam Hugo (HKG)	9
8	Oh Sang-uk (KOR)	15
5	Artyom Sarkissyan (KAZ)	15
12	Gisho Nidhi Kumaresan Padma (IND)	11
20	Adel Al-Mutairi (KSA)	9
4	Do Gyeong-dong (KOR)	15

Quarterfinals
1	Chan Lok Hei Royce (HKG)	6
8	Oh Sang-uk (KOR)	15
5	Artyom Sarkissyan (KAZ)	15
4	Do Gyeong-dong (KOR)	14

Semifinals
8	Oh Sang-uk (KOR)	15
5	Artyom Sarkissyan (KAZ)	9

==== Bottom half ====
Table of 32
19	Islambek Abdazov (UZB)	15
14	Amaar Alammari (KUW)	9
11	Christian Jhester Concepcion (PHI)	15
22	Abdallah Tahla (JOR)	8
23	Karan Singh (IND)	14
10	Luo Shaotong (CHN)	15
15	Shen Chenpeng (CHN)	15
18	Nguyễn Xuân Lợi (VIE)	7

Table of 16
3	Ali Pakdaman (IRI)	15
19	Islambek Abdazov (UZB)	13
11	Christian Jhester Concepcion (PHI)	7
6	Mohammad Fotouhi Firozabad (IRI)	15
7	Mao Kokubo (JPN)	15
10	Luo Shaotong (CHN)	2
15	Shen Chenpeng (CHN)	15
2	Voragun Srinualnad (THA)	6

Quarterfinals
3	Ali Pakdaman (IRI)	15
6	Mohammad Fotouhi Firozabad (IRI)	7
7	Mao Kokubo (JPN)	9
15	Shen Chenpeng (CHN)	15

Semifinals
3	Ali Pakdaman (IRI)	9
15	Shen Chenpeng (CHN)	15

== Final standing ==
Rank	Athlete
1st place, gold medalist(s)	Oh Sang-uk (KOR)
2nd place, silver medalist(s)	Shen Chenpeng (CHN)
3rd place, bronze medalist(s)	Ali Pakdaman (IRI)
3rd place, bronze medalist(s)	Artyom Sarkissyan (KAZ)
5	Chan Lok Hei Royce (HKG)
6	Do Gyeong-dong (KOR)
7	Mohammad Fotouhi Firozabad (IRI)
8	Mao Kokubo (JPN)
9	Voragun Srinualnad (THA)
10	Luo Shaotong (CHN)
11	Christian Jhester Concepcion (PHI)
12	Gisho Nidhi Kumaresan Padma (IND)
13	Musa Aymuratov (UZB)
14	Islambek Abdazov (UZB)
15	Adel Al-Mutairi (KSA)
16	Ho Pak Lam Hugo (HKG)
17	Mohammad Abdulkareem (KUW)
18	Eunice Daniel Villanueva (PHI)
19	Amaar Alammari (KUW)
20	Shido Tsumori (JPN)
21	Nguyễn Xuân Lợi (VIE)
22	Quentin Saysana Geoffroy (LAO)
23	Abdallah Tahla (JOR)
24	Karan Singh (IND)
25	Nurmukhammed Zhailybay (KAZ)
26	Nguyễn Văn Quyết (VIE)
27	Fayadh Alobaid (KSA)
28	Ahmed Alhammadi (UAE)
29	Muhammad Nauman Ejaz (PAK)
