= Fencing at the 2026 Asian Games – Men's team sabre =

Men's team sabre at the 2026 Asian Games
- Venue: Aichi Sky Expo Hall F
- Date: 26 September 2026
- Competitors: 47 from 12 nations

Medalists
gold medal	South Korea; Do Gyeong-dong, Hwang Hee-geun, Oh Sang-uk, Park Sang-won
silver medal	Japan; Mao Kokubo, Hayato Tsubo, Shido Tsumori, Kento Yoshida
bronze medal	Hong Kong; Chan Lok Hei Royce, Ho Pak Lam Hugo, Ho Sze Long Aaron, Leung Tin Ching
bronze medal	Kazakhstan; Kuanysh Ergashbay, Artyom Sarkissyan, Nazarbay Sattarkhan, Nurmukhammed Zhailybay

The men's team sabre competition at the 2026 Asian Games in Nagoya was held on 26 September 2026 at the Aichi Sky Expo Hall F. South Korea defeated Japan 45–44 in the final to win its fourth consecutive title in the event. Hong Kong, China and Kazakhstan shared the bronze medals.

== Schedule ==
All times are Japan Standard Time (UTC+09:00)

Date	Time	Event
Saturday, 26 September 2026	10:30	Table of 16
Saturday, 26 September 2026	11:30	Quarterfinals
Saturday, 26 September 2026	16:00	Semifinals
Saturday, 26 September 2026	18:20	Gold medal match

== Seeding ==
The teams were seeded taking into account the results achieved by competitors representing each team in the individual event.

Rank	Team	Fencer		Total
Rank	Team	1	2	Total
1	South Korea (KOR)	1	1	2
2	Iran (IRI)	2	5	7
3	China (CHN)	3	9	12
4	Hong Kong (HKG)	6	16	22
5	Uzbekistan (UZB)	10	14	24
6	Kazakhstan (KAZ)	12	18	30
7	Japan (JPN)	4	26	30
8	Philippines (PHI)	20	28	48
9	India (IND)	22	32	54
10	Kuwait (KUW)	24	31	55
11	Saudi Arabia (KSA)	25	36	61
12	Vietnam (VIE)	34	42	76

== Results ==
Table of 16
9	India	45
8	Philippines	27
5	Uzbekistan	45
12	Vietnam	35
11	Saudi Arabia	32
6	Kazakhstan	45
7	Japan	45
10	Kuwait	35

Quarterfinals
1	South Korea	45
9	India	25
5	Uzbekistan	40
4	Hong Kong	45
3	China	40
6	Kazakhstan	45
7	Japan	45
2	Iran	34

Semifinals
1	South Korea	45
4	Hong Kong	24
6	Kazakhstan	34
7	Japan	45

Gold medal match
1	South Korea	45
7	Japan	44

== Final standing ==
Rank	Team
1st place, gold medalist(s)	South Korea (KOR); Do Gyeong-dong; Hwang Hee-geun; Oh Sang-uk; Park Sang-won
2nd place, silver medalist(s)	Japan (JPN); Mao Kokubo; Hayato Tsubo; Shido Tsumori; Kento Yoshida
3rd place, bronze medalist(s)	Hong Kong (HKG); Chan Lok Hei Royce; Ho Pak Lam Hugo; Ho Sze Long Aaron; Leung Tin Ching
3rd place, bronze medalist(s)	Kazakhstan (KAZ); Kuanysh Ergashbay; Artyom Sarkissyan; Nazarbay Sattarkhan; Nurmukhammed Zhailybay
5	China (CHN); Lin Xiao; Luo Shaotong; Shen Chenpeng; Wei Zhenhao
6	Uzbekistan (UZB); Islambek Abdazov; Sardor Abdukarimbekov; Musa Aymuratov; Alpamis Urakbaev
7	Iran (IRI); Mohammad Fotouhi Firozabad; Taha Kargarpoor; Ali Pakdaman; Nima Zahedi
8	Philippines (PHI); Christian Jhester Concepcion; Nathaniel Perez; Sammuel Tranquilan; Eunice Daniel Villanueva
9	India (IND); Lakshay Badser; Gisho Nidhi Kumaresan Padma; Karan Singh; Vishal Thapar
10	Kuwait (KUW); Mohammad Abdulkareem; Amaar Alammari; Yousiff Alshamlan; Abdulaziz Jomah
11	Saudi Arabia (KSA); Abdullah Almansaf; Abdulaziz Almansaf; Adel Al-Mutairi; Fayadh Alobaid
12	Vietnam (VIE); Lê Văn Bằng; Nguyễn Văn Quyết; Nguyễn Xuân Lợi
