= Tommaso Martini (fencer) =

Italian fencer (born 2002)

Personal information
- Born: 17 July 2002 (age 24)

Fencing career
- Sport: Fencing
- Country: Italy
- Weapon: Foil
- Hand: Right-handed
Medal record
Men's foil
Representing Italy
World Championships
Gold medal – first place	2026 Hong Kong	Team
European Championships
Bronze medal – third place	2026 Antony	Individual
World University Games
Gold medal – first place	2025 Rhine-Ruhr	Team
Bronze medal – third place	2021 Chengdu	Team
Bronze medal – third place	2025 Rhine-Ruhr	Individual

Tommaso Martini (born 17 July 2002) is an Italian right-handed foil fencer.

== Career ==
Martini represented Italy at the 2025 Summer World University Games in fencing and won a gold medal in the team foil event and a bronze medal in the individual event.

In June 2026, he competed at the 2026 European Fencing Championships and won a bronze medal in the individual foil event. He lost to Andrzej Rządkowski in the semifinals and was hampered by a hip flexor injury during the match. The next month he competed at the 2026 World Fencing Championships and won a gold medal in the team foil event.
