= Radu Nițu =

Romanian fencer (born 2004)

Personal information
- Born: 13 November 2004 (age 21)

Fencing career
- Sport: Fencing
- Country: Romania
- Weapon: Sabre
- Hand: Right-handed
Medal record
Men's sabre
Representing Romania
World Championships
Bronze medal – third place	2025 Tbilisi	Team
Bronze medal – third place	2026 Hong Kong	Individual
Bronze medal – third place	2026 Hong Kong	Team
European Championships
Silver medal – second place	2024 Basel	Team
Silver medal – second place	2026 Antony	Team

Radu Nițu (born 13 November 2004) is an Romanian right-handed sabre fencer. He is a two-time World Fencing Championships bronze medalist.

== Career ==
In June 2024, Nițu competed at the 2024 European Fencing Championships and won a silver medal in the team sabre event. In July 2025, he competed at the 2025 World Fencing Championships and won a bronze medal in the team sabre event.

In June 2026, he competed at the 2026 European Fencing Championships and won a silver medal in the team sabre event. The next month he competed at the 2026 World Fencing Championships and won a bronze medal in the individual sabre event.
