= Fencing at the 2025 Summer World University Games =

International fencing championship event

- Venue: Messe Essen
- Dates: 17–22 July 2025
- Nations: 50

Fencing took place at the 2025 Summer World University Games from 17 to 22 July 2025 at the Messe Essen in Essen, Germany.

== Medal table ==
* Host nation (Germany)

Rank	Nation	Gold	Silver	Bronze	Total
1	South Korea	5	1	3	9
2	Italy	3	3	4	10
3	France	1	1	1	3
4	Japan	1	0	4	5
5	Hong Kong	1	0	1	2
–	Individual Neutral Athletes	1	0	1	2
6	Hungary	0	4	1	5
7	Poland	0	2	0	2
8	Ukraine	0	1	1	2
9	Germany*	0	0	1	1
9	Switzerland	0	0	1	1
Totals (10 entries)		12	12	18	42

== Medal summary ==
=== Men's events ===
Event	Gold	Silver	Bronze
Individual épée	Dmitrii Shvelidze; Individual Neutral Athletes	Soma Somody; Hungary	Sven Vineis; Switzerland
Individual épée	Dmitrii Shvelidze; Individual Neutral Athletes	Soma Somody; Hungary	Kirill Gurov; Individual Neutral Athletes
Individual sabre	Park Sang-won; South Korea	Gergő Horváth; Hungary	Moritz Schenkel; Germany
Individual sabre	Park Sang-won; South Korea	Gergő Horváth; Hungary	Hwang Hee-geun; South Korea
Individual foil	Damiano Di Veroli; Italy	Jan Nowak; Poland	Tommaso Martini; Italy
Individual foil	Damiano Di Veroli; Italy	Jan Nowak; Poland	Choi Min-seo; South Korea
Team épée	Japan; Seiya Asami; Ryu Matsumoto; Naoshi Nakamoto; Hidemasa Sakato	Hungary; Ádám Keresztes; Gergely Kovács; Maruan Osman-Touson; Soma Somody	Italy; Fabrizio Cuomo; Nicolo' Del Contrasto; Fabrizio Di Marco; Simone Mencarelli
Team sabre	South Korea; Hwang Hee-geun; Lim Jae-yun; Park Jung-ho; Park Sang-won	Italy; Cosimo Bertini; Marco Mastrullo; Mattia Rea; Edoardo Reale	Japan; Reo Hiwatashi; Hibiki Kato; Yuto Rikitake; Hayato Tsubo
Team foil	Italy; Damiano Di Veroli; Giulio Lombardi; Tommaso Martini; Federico Pistorio	Poland; Maciej Bem; Mateusz Kwiatkowski; Jan Nowak; Szymon Pacholczyk	Japan; Ryosuke Fukuda; Shoren Hayashi; Yasutaka Nishiguchi; Hiroto Sugaya

=== Women's events ===
Event	Gold	Silver	Bronze
Individual épée	Kaylin Hsieh; Hong Kong	Anna Maksymenko; Ukraine	Emily Conrad; Ukraine
Individual épée	Kaylin Hsieh; Hong Kong	Anna Maksymenko; Ukraine	Edina Cardos; Hungary
Individual sabre	Jeon Ha-young; South Korea	Anna Spiesz; Hungary	Chirika Takahashi; Japan
Individual sabre	Jeon Ha-young; South Korea	Anna Spiesz; Hungary	Summer Fay Sit; Hong Kong
Individual foil	Aurora Grandis; Italy	Mo Byeoli; South Korea	Carlotta Ferrari; Italy
Individual foil	Aurora Grandis; Italy	Mo Byeoli; South Korea	Esther Bonny; France
Team épée	France; Alice Conrad; Océane Francillone; Emma Lauvray; Kelly Lusinier	Italy; Elena Ferracuti; Carola Maccagno; Eleonora Orso; Vittoria Siletti	South Korea; Kim Na-kyeong; Kim Tae-hee; Lim Tae-hee; Park Ha-been
Team sabre	South Korea; Choi Se-bin; Jeon Ha-young; Kim Jeong-mi; Seon Eun-bi	France; Kelly Lusinier; Mathilde Mouroux; Garance Roger; Lola Tranquille	Italy; Alessia Di Carlo; Benedetta Fusetti; Michela Landi; Claudia Rotili
Team foil	South Korea; Kim Ho-yeon; Mo Byeoli; Park Ji-hee; Sim So-eun	Italy; Giulia Amore; Irene Bertini; Carlotta Ferrari; Aurora Grandis	Japan; Ayano Iimura; Reina Iwamoto; Rino Nagase; Yuzuha Takeyama
