= Lee Seung-yong =

South Korean fencer

Personal information
- Born: 6 September 1970 (age 55)

Sport
- Sport: Fencing

- Lee Seung-yong
- Hangul: 이승용
- RR: I Seungyong
- MR: I Sŭngyong

Lee Seung-yong (born 6 September 1970) is a South Korean fencer and PE teacher at Osung High School in Daegu. He competed in the team foil events at the 1992 Summer Olympics in Barcelona, Catalonia, Spain. After his career as fencer, he is hired by Osung High School as PE teacher where is his alma matar. He taught Gu Bon-gil, Oh Eun-seok and Do Gyeong-dong when they attended Osung Middle School and Osung High School in Daegu, North Gyeongsang Province, Korea
