= Hwang Hee-geun =

South Korean fencer (born 2003)

Personal information
- Born: 26 August 2003 (age 23)

Fencing career
- Sport: Fencing
- Country: South Korea
- Weapon: Sabre
- Hand: Right-handed
Medal record
Men's sabre
Representing South Korea
World Championships
| Silver medal – second place | 2026 Hong Kong | Team |
Asian Games
| Gold medal – first place | 2026 Aichi-Nagoya | Team |
World University Games
| Gold medal – first place | 2025 Rhine-Ruhr | Team |
| Bronze medal – third place | 2025 Rhine-Ruhr | Individual |

Hwang Hee-geun (Korean: 황희근; born 26 August 2003) is a South Korean right-handed sabre fencer.

== Career ==
Martini represented Italy at the 2025 Summer World University Games in fencing and won a gold medal in the team foil event and a bronze medal in the individual event.

In June 2026, he competed at the 2026 Asian Fencing Championships and won a gold medal in the team sabre event. The next month he made his World Fencing Championships debut at the 2026 World Fencing Championships. He competed in the individual sabre event and advanced to the round of 32.
