= Shido Tsumori =

Japanese fencer

Personal information
- Nationality: Japanese
- Born: September 19, 2003 (age 23) Japan

Fencing career
- Sport: Fencing
- Weapon: Sabre
- Hand: Right-handed
- Club: Miki House
Medal record
Men's fencing
Representing Japan
Asian Games
Silver medal – second place	2026 Aichi-Nagoya	Men's team sabre

Shido Tsumori (Japanese: 津森 志道; born 19 September 2003) is a Japanese fencer who competes in sabre. He represented Japan at the 2026 Asian Games, where he won the silver medal in the men's team sabre event.

== Career ==
Tsumori studied at Hosei University and is affiliated with Miki House. He began fencing in 2011, initially competing in foil before switching to sabre in 2016.

Tsumori has competed in international senior sabre events, including the Asian Fencing Championships and the Fencing World Cup. The International Fencing Federation records medals for him at zone championships and a World Cup event.

At the 2026 Asian Games in Aichi and Nagoya, Japan, Tsumori competed in both the men's individual and team sabre events. He was eliminated in the first round of the individual competition. In the men's team sabre, he represented Japan as the team reached the final and won the silver medal.
