= Vishal Thapar =

Indian sabre (fencer)

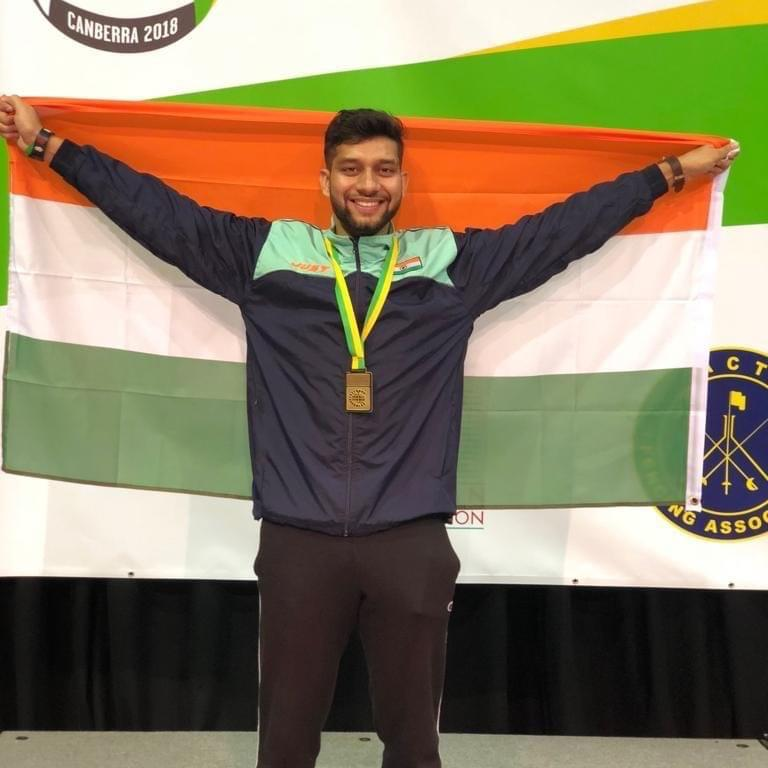

Personal information
- Nationality: Indian
- Born: 6 April 1994 (age 32) Jammu, Jammu and Kashmir, India

Fencing career
- Sport: Fencing
- Country: India
- Weapon: Sabre
Medal record
Men's fencing
Representing India
Commonwealth Championships
Gold medal – first place	2018 Canberra	Sabre Team

Vishal Thapar is an Indian sabre fencer. He won a gold medal at the Commonwealth Championships in 2018. He represented India at the Sabre World Cup.

== Tournaments and medals ==
After winning several national tournaments vishal took part in Commonwealth fencing championship held in Australia in 2018 and won a gold medal. He also took part in World Cup in Madrid, Spain, Asian Championship in Seoul, Korea, World Fencing Championship 2022 in Cairo, Egypt and Commonwealth Championship London in the year 2022.
