= Mao Kokubo =

Japanese sabre fencer

Personal information
- Nationality: Japanese
- Born: January 8, 2003 (age 23) Mie Prefecture, Japan

Fencing career
- Sport: Fencing
- Weapon: Sabre
- Hand: Right-handed
- Club: Miki House
Medal record
Men's fencing
Representing Japan
Asian Games
Silver medal – second place	2026 Aichi-Nagoya	Men's team sabre
Asian Fencing Championships
Gold medal – first place	2025 Bali	Men's team sabre
Bronze medal – third place	2025 Bali	Men's individual sabre
Silver medal – second place	2026 New Delhi	Men's team sabre
Fencing World Cup
Silver medal – second place	2026 Salt Lake City	Men's individual sabre
Bronze medal – third place	2025 Algiers	Men's team sabre
World Junior Fencing Championships
Silver medal – second place	2023 Plovdiv	Men's individual sabre
Asian Fencing Championships
Silver medal – second place	2022 Seoul	Men's team sabre

Mao Kokubo (Japanese: 小久保 真旺; born 8 January 2003) is a Japanese fencer who competes in sabre. He represents Japan in international competitions and is affiliated with Miki House. He won the silver medal in the men's team sabre at the 2026 Asian Games and has also won medals at the Asian Fencing Championships and Fencing World Cup.

== Career ==
Kokubo graduated from Seisa International High School and Hosei University before joining Miki House in 2025. He began competing in senior national fencing events while at university and won the men's individual sabre title at the 2020 All-Japan Fencing Championships.

In 2022, Kokubo represented Japan at the Asian Fencing Championships in Seoul, South Korea, where he won silver in the men's team sabre. In 2023, he won silver in the men's individual sabre at the World Junior Fencing Championships in Plovdiv, Bulgaria, and gold in the men's team sabre at a junior World Cup event.

At the 2025 Asian Fencing Championships in Bali, Indonesia, Kokubo won bronze in the men's individual sabre and gold in the men's team sabre. Japan defeated South Korea 45–41 in the team final, securing the country's first gold medal in the event at the championships. Later that year, he competed at the World Fencing Championships in Tbilisi, Georgia, finishing fourth in the men's team sabre and 31st in the individual event.

In November 2025, Kokubo was part of the Japanese men's team sabre squad that won bronze at the World Cup in Algiers, Algeria. Japan defeated the neutral-athlete team 45–32 in the bronze-medal match. It was the first World Cup team medal for Japan in men's sabre.

In January 2026, Kokubo won silver in the men's individual sabre at the Fencing World Cup in Salt Lake City, Utah, United States. He defeated South Korea's Do Gyeong-dong in the quarter-finals and Egypt's Ziad Elsissy in the semi-finals before losing to South Korea's Oh Sang-uk in the final, 15–12.

At the 2026 Asian Fencing Championships in New Delhi, India, Kokubo finished fifth in the men's individual sabre and won silver in the team event.

Kokubo competed at the 2026 Asian Games in Aichi and Nagoya, Japan. In the men's individual sabre, he reached the quarter-finals before losing to China's Shen Chenpeng, finishing among the last eight competitors. In the men's team sabre, he helped Japan reach the final against South Korea. Japan lost 45–44 and received the silver medal.

== Medal record ==
=== World Cup ===
Date	Location	Event	Position
2026-10-15	Oran, Algeria	Individual Men's Sabre	3rd
