= Park Sang-won (fencer) =

South Korean fencer (born 2000)

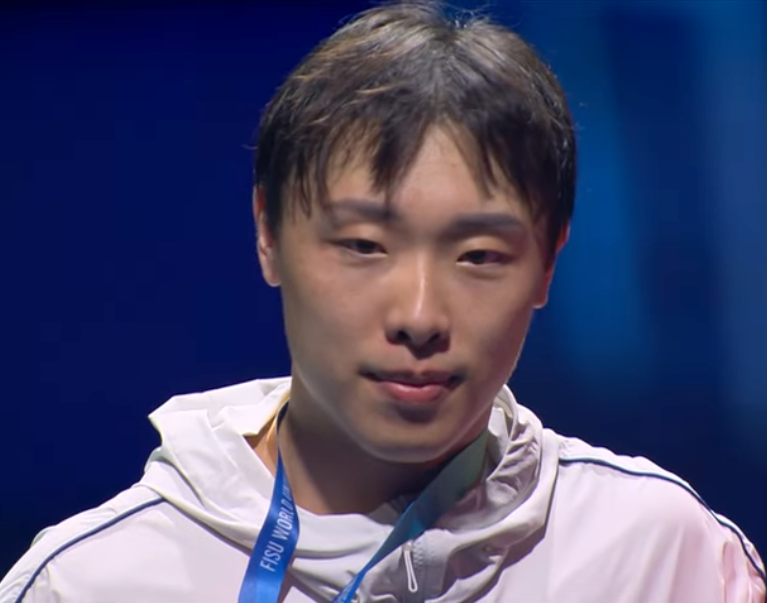
- At the 2025 Summer World University Games

Personal information
- Born: 14 September 2000 (age 26) Seoul, South Korea
- Height: 1.79 m (5 ft 10 in)

Fencing career
- Sport: Fencing
- Country: South Korea
- Weapon: Sabre
- Hand: right-handed
- Club: Daejeon City
- FIE ranking: current ranking
Medal record
Men's sabre
Representing South Korea
Olympic Games
Gold medal – first place	2024 Paris	Team
World Championships
Silver medal – second place	2026 Hong Kong	Team
Asian Games
Gold medal – first place	2026 Aichi-Nagoya	Team
Asian Championships
Gold medal – first place	2024 Kuwait City	Team
World University Games
Gold medal – first place	2021 Chengdu	Individual
Gold medal – first place	2025 Rhine-Ruhr	Individual
Silver medal – second place	2021 Chengdu	Team

Park Sang-won (Korean: 박상원; born 14 September 2000) is a South Korean fencer. He represented South Korea at the 2024 Summer Olympics.
