= Hayato Tsubo =

Japanese sabre fencer

Personal information
- Nationality: Japanese
- Born: May 21, 2003 (age 23) Mutsu, Aomori, Japan
- Education: Nippon Sport Science University

Fencing career
- Sport: Fencing
- Weapon: Sabre
- Hand: Right-handed
- Club: T.U.B Associates
Medal record
Men's fencing
Representing Japan
Asian Games
Silver medal – second place	2026 Aichi-Nagoya	Men's team sabre
FISU World University Games
Bronze medal – third place	2025 Rhine-Ruhr	Men's team sabre

Hayato Tsubo (Japanese: 坪 颯登, romanized: Tsubo Hayato; born 21 May 2003) is a Japanese sabre fencer. He represented Japan at the 2026 Asian Games, where he won the silver medal in the men's team sabre event. He has also won a bronze medal in the men's team sabre at the 2025 Summer World University Games.

== Career ==
Tsubo studied at Nippon Sport Science University and is affiliated with T.U.B Associates. He competes in sabre and has represented Japan in international fencing competitions.

In September 2023, Tsubo competed in the men's team sabre at the 2022 Asian Games, held in Hangzhou, China. Japan reached the quarter-finals before losing to South Korea and finished outside the medals.

In September 2024, Tsubo won the men's individual sabre title at the All-Japan Fencing Championships, his first national individual championship title.

In July 2025, Tsubo was part of the Japanese men's team sabre squad that won the bronze medal at the 2025 Summer World University Games in Rhine-Ruhr, Germany. Japan defeated Hungary 45–39 in the bronze-medal match after losing to South Korea in the semi-finals. His teammates were Hibiki Kato, Yuto Rikitake and Reo Hiwatashi.

Tsubo was also selected to represent Japan at the 2026 Asian Fencing Championships in New Delhi, India, and the 2026 World Fencing Championships in Hong Kong.

At the 2026 Asian Games in Aichi and Nagoya, Japan, Tsubo competed in the men's individual and team sabre events. In the team competition, Japan advanced to the final and won the silver medal.
