= Do Gyeong-dong =

South Korean fencer (born 1999)

Personal information
- Native name: 도경동
- Born: August 19, 1999 (age 27) Yeongcheon, South Korea
- Height: 188 cm (6 ft 2 in)

Fencing career
- Sport: Fencing
- Country: South Korea
- Weapon: Sabre
- Hand: right-handed
Medal record
Men's fencing
Representing South Korea
Olympic Games
| Gold medal – first place | 2024 Paris | Team |
World Championships
| Silver medal – second place | 2026 Hong Kong | Individual |
| Silver medal – second place | 2026 Hong Kong | Team |
Asian Games
| Gold medal – first place | 2026 Aichi-Nagoya | Team |

Do Gyeong-dong (Korean: 도경동; born 19 August 1999) is a South Korean sabre fencer. He competed at the 2024 Summer Olympics and won a gold medal in the men's team sabre event.

== Early life ==
Do was born on 19 August 1999. From Yeongcheon, he attended Osung Middle School and then Osung High School, where he competed in sabre fencing under coach Lee Seung-yong, who participated at the 1992 Summer Olympics. He later attended Dong-Eui University in Busan, where he studied physical education. In 2019, his second year at the university, he helped his school's team place runner-up at the national championships and was selected for the South Korean U-23 national team, competing at the Asian U-23 championships where he helped his team win the gold medal and won an individual gold medal.

== Career ==
In 2021, Do was named to the national team after reaching the semifinals of the President's Cup National Championships, later competing for the national team at the International Grand Prix in France. In 2022, he competed at the World Cup in Algeria and helped the South Korean team to first place. Do enlisted in the South Korean military in April 2023 as a member of the Korea Armed Forces Athletic Corps. Later that year, he participated in the Summer World University Games, winning a silver medal in the team event.

Do was selected to compete at the 2024 Summer Olympics in the men's team sabre event. He was an unused reserve in the quarterfinals and semifinals, before being used as a substitute in the finals against Hungary. Coming in when the score was 30–29 in favor of South Korea, he scored five consecutive points against Krisztián Rabb, which proved key in his team's 45–41 victory for the gold medal. His medal win allowed him to be discharged from the military two months early. Later in 2024, he won individual national championships at the President's Cup and the National Team Selection Tournament.
