= United States at the 2024 Summer Olympics =

United States at the Games of the XXXIII Olympiad in Paris

- Flag of the United States
- IOC code: USA
- NOC: United States Olympic & Paralympic Committee
- Website: www.teamusa.org

in Paris, France July 26, 2024 – August 11, 2024
- Competitors: 592 (278 men and 314 women) in 34 sports
- Flag bearers (opening): LeBron James & Coco Gauff
- Flag bearers (closing): Nick Mead & Katie Ledecky
- Officials: Rocky Harris, chef de mission
- Medals Ranked 1st: Gold 40 Silver 44 Bronze 42 Total 126

Summer Olympics appearances (overview)
- 1896; 1900; 1904; 1908; 1912; 1920; 1924; 1928; 1932; 1936; 1948; 1952; 1956; 1960; 1964; 1968; 1972; 1976; 1980; 1984; 1988; 1992; 1996; 2000; 2004; 2008; 2012; 2016; 2020; 2024; 2028

Other related appearances
- 1906 Intercalated Games

The United States of America (USA), represented by the United States Olympic & Paralympic Committee (USOPC), competed at the 2024 Summer Olympics in Paris from July 26 to August 11, 2024. U.S. athletes have appeared in every Summer Olympic Games of the modern era, except for the 1980 edition in Moscow, when America led a sixty-six-nation boycott in protest of the Soviet invasion of Afghanistan. As Los Angeles is hosting the 2028 Summer Olympics, the United States marched penultimately before the homebound French team entered Place du Trocadéro during the parade of nations segment of the opening ceremony. Additionally, an American segment featuring H.E.R. and Tom Cruise from Paris, and the Red Hot Chili Peppers, Billie Eilish, Snoop Dogg, and Dr. Dre from Long Beach, was performed during the closing ceremony.

The opening ceremony flag-bearers for the United States were LeBron James and Coco Gauff. James, a two-time Olympic gold medalist, is the first male basketball player to be chosen. At 20 years of age, Gauff is the youngest American athlete and the first tennis player to be so honored. The closing ceremony flag-bearers were Nick Mead and Katie Ledecky. Mead was part of the U.S. men's four rowing team that won their first gold medal since 1960, while Ledecky, a nine-time Olympic gold medalist, became the most decorated female Olympian to be chosen.

The United States competed in all sports except handball and was represented by more female than male athletes for the fourth consecutive time in the Summer Olympics (278 men and 314 women).

The team topped the medal rankings for the fourth consecutive and 19th overall time, with a total of 40 gold, 44 silver, and 42 bronze medals. Tied with China on golds (40), the U.S. placed first in the overall medal tally via a tiebreaker (44–27 in silver). The occasion marked the first time in Summer Olympic history that two countries finished with an equal number of gold medals at the top. Additionally, the Americans won 126 medals overall compared to China's 91.

Two days before the opening ceremony, the International Olympic Committee (IOC) announced Salt Lake City would host the 2034 Winter Olympics, making the fifth city ever to host the Winter Olympic Games twice.

== Medalists ==
The following U.S. competitors won medals at the games. In the discipline sections below, the medalists' names are bolded.

Medal	Name	Sport	Event	Date
Gold	Jack Alexy; Hunter Armstrong; Caeleb Dressel; Chris Guiliano; Ryan Held^{[a]} Matt King^{[a]}	Swimming	Men's 4 × 100 m freestyle relay	July 27
Gold	Lee Kiefer	Fencing	Women's foil	July 28
Gold	Torri Huske	Swimming	Women's 100 m butterfly	July 28
Gold	Simone Biles; Jade Carey; Jordan Chiles; Sunisa Lee; Hezly Rivera	Gymnastics	Women's artistic team all-around	July 30
Gold	Katie Ledecky	Swimming	Women's 1500 m freestyle	July 31
Gold	Jacqueline Dubrovich; Lee Kiefer; Lauren Scruggs; Maia Weintraub	Fencing	Women's team foil	August 1
Gold	Simone Biles	Gymnastics	Women's artistic individual all-around	August 1
Gold	Justin Best; Liam Corrigan; Michael Grady; Nick Mead	Rowing	Men's four	August 1
Gold	Kate Douglass	Swimming	Women's 200 m breaststroke	August 1
Gold	Ryan Crouser	Athletics	Men's shot put	August 3
Gold	Simone Biles	Gymnastics	Women's vault	August 3
Gold	Vincent Hancock	Shooting	Men's skeet	August 3
Gold	Katie Ledecky	Swimming	Women's 800 m freestyle	August 3
Gold	Caeleb Dressel^{[a]} Nic Fink; Torri Huske; Ryan Murphy; Regan Smith^{[a]} Charlie Swanson^{[a]} Gretchen Walsh; Abbey Weitzeil^{[a]}	Swimming	Mixed 4 × 100 m medley relay	August 3
Gold	Noah Lyles	Athletics	Men's 100 m	August 4
Gold	Kristen Faulkner	Cycling	Women's individual road race	August 4
Gold	Scottie Scheffler	Golf	Men's individual	August 4
Gold	Bobby Finke	Swimming	Men's 1500 m freestyle	August 4
Gold	Katharine Berkoff^{[a]} Kate Douglass^{[a]} Torri Huske; Lilly King; Alex Shackell^{[a]} Regan Smith; Gretchen Walsh; Emma Weber^{[a]}	Swimming	Women's 4 × 100 m medley relay	August 4
Gold	Valarie Allman	Athletics	Women's discus throw	August 5
Gold	Caroline Marks	Surfing	Women's shortboard	August 5
Gold	Cole Hocker	Athletics	Men's 1500 m	August 6
Gold	Gabby Thomas	Athletics	Women's 200 m	August 6
Gold	Amit Elor	Wrestling	Women's freestyle 68 kg	August 6
Gold	Quincy Hall	Athletics	Men's 400 m	August 7
Gold	Chloé Dygert; Kristen Faulkner; Jennifer Valente; Lily Williams	Cycling	Women's team pursuit	August 7
Gold	Sarah Hildebrandt	Wrestling	Women's freestyle 50 kg	August 7
Gold	Grant Holloway	Athletics	Men's 110 m hurdles	August 8
Gold	Sydney McLaughlin-Levrone	Athletics	Women's 400 m hurdles	August 8
Gold	Tara Davis-Woodhall	Athletics	Women's long jump	August 8
Gold	Rai Benjamin	Athletics	Men's 400 m hurdles	August 9
Gold	Melissa Jefferson; Sha'Carri Richardson; Twanisha Terry; Gabby Thomas	Athletics	Women's 4 × 100 m relay	August 9
Gold	Olivia Reeves	Weightlifting	Women's 71 kg	August 9
Gold	Christopher Bailey; Rai Benjamin; Bryce Deadmon; Vernon Norwood; Quincy Wilson^{[a]}	Athletics	Men's 4 × 400 m relay	August 10
Gold	Masai Russell	Athletics	Women's 100 m hurdles	August 10
Gold	Kaylyn Brown^{[a]} Aaliyah Butler^{[a]} Quanera Hayes^{[a]} Alexis Holmes; Shamier Little; Sydney McLaughlin-Levrone; Gabby Thomas	Athletics	Women's 4 × 400 m relay	August 10
Gold	United States men's national basketball team: Bam Adebayo; Devin Booker; Stephen Curry; Anthony Davis; Kevin Durant; Anthony Edwards; Joel Embiid; Tyrese Haliburton; Jrue Holiday; LeBron James; Jayson Tatum; Derrick White	Basketball	Men's tournament	August 10
Gold	United States women's national soccer team: Korbin Albert; Croix Bethune; Sam Coffey; Tierna Davidson; Crystal Dunn; Emily Fox; Naomi Girma; Lindsey Horan; Casey Krueger; Rose Lavelle; Casey Murphy; Alyssa Naeher; Jenna Nighswonger; Trinity Rodman; Emily Sams; Jaedyn Shaw; Sophia Smith; Emily Sonnett; Mallory Swanson; Lynn Williams	Football	Women's tournament	August 10
Gold	United States women's national basketball team: Napheesa Collier; Kahleah Copper; Chelsea Gray; Brittney Griner; Sabrina Ionescu; Jewell Loyd; Kelsey Plum; Breanna Stewart; Diana Taurasi; Alyssa Thomas; A'ja Wilson; Jackie Young	Basketball	Women's tournament	August 11
Gold	Jennifer Valente	Cycling	Women's omnium	August 11
Silver	Sarah Bacon; Kassidy Cook	Diving	Women's synchronized 3 m springboard	July 27
Silver	Erika Connolly^{[a]} Kate Douglass; Torri Huske; Simone Manuel; Gretchen Walsh; Abbey Weitzeil^{[a]}	Swimming	Women's 4 × 100 m freestyle relay	July 27
Silver	Haley Batten	Cycling	Women's cross-country	July 28
Silver	Lauren Scruggs	Fencing	Women's foil	July 28
Silver	Nic Fink	Swimming	Men's 100 m breaststroke	July 28
Silver	Gretchen Walsh	Swimming	Women's 100 m butterfly	July 28
Silver	Jagger Eaton	Skateboarding	Men's street	July 29
Silver	Katie Grimes	Swimming	Women's 400 m individual medley	July 29
Silver	Bobby Finke	Swimming	Men's 800 m freestyle	July 30
Silver	Brooks Curry^{[a]} Carson Foster; Chris Guiliano^{[a]} Luke Hobson; Drew Kibler; Blake Pieroni^{[a]} Kieran Smith	Swimming	Men's 4 × 200 m freestyle relay	July 30
Silver	Regan Smith	Swimming	Women's 100 m backstroke	July 30
Silver	Perris Benegas	Cycling	Women's BMX freestyle	July 31
Silver	Torri Huske	Swimming	Women's 100 m freestyle	July 31
Silver	Regan Smith	Swimming	Women's 200 m butterfly	August 1
Silver	Erin Gemmel; Katie Ledecky; Paige Madden; Simone Manuel^{[a]} Anna Peplowski^{[a]} Alex Shackell^{[a]} Claire Weinstein	Swimming	Women's 4 × 200 m freestyle relay	August 1
Silver	Karl Cook; Laura Kraut; McLain Ward	Equestrian	Team jumping	August 2
Silver	Sagen Maddalena	Shooting	Women's 50 m rifle three positions	August 2
Silver	Regan Smith	Swimming	Women's 200 m backstroke	August 2
Silver	Joe Kovacs	Athletics	Men's shot put	August 3
Silver	Sha'Carri Richardson	Athletics	Women's 100 m	August 3
Silver	Kaylyn Brown; Bryce Deadmon; Shamier Little; Vernon Norwood	Athletics	Mixed 4 × 400 m relay	August 3
Silver	Conner Prince	Shooting	Men's skeet	August 3
Silver	Kate Douglass	Swimming	Women's 200 m individual medley	August 3
Silver	Austin Krajicek; Rajeev Ram	Tennis	Men's doubles	August 3
Silver	Brady Ellison	Archery	Men's individual	August 4
Silver	Jack Alexy^{[a]} Hunter Armstrong; Caeleb Dressel; Nic Fink; Thomas Heilman^{[a]} Ryan Murphy; Charlie Swanson^{[a]}	Swimming	Men's 4 × 100 m medley relay	August 4
Silver	Sam Kendricks	Athletics	Men's pole vault	August 5
Silver	Simone Biles	Gymnastics	Women's floor	August 5
Silver	Vincent Hancock; Austen Smith	Shooting	Mixed skeet team	August 5
Silver	Taylor Knibb; Morgan Pearson; Seth Rider; Taylor Spivey	Triathlon	Mixed relay	August 5
Silver	Annette Echikunwoke	Athletics	Women's hammer throw	August 6
Silver	Anita Alvarez; Jamie Czarkowski; Megumi Field; Keana Hunter; Audrey Kwon; Jacklyn Luu; Daniella Ramirez; Ruby Remati	Artistic swimming	Women's Team	August 7
Silver	Katie Moon	Athletics	Women's pole vault	August 7
Silver	Kenneth Rooks	Athletics	Men's 3000 m steeplechase	August 7
Silver	Tom Schaar	Skateboarding	Men's park	August 7
Silver	Kenny Bednarek	Athletics	Men's 200 m	August 8
Silver	Daniel Roberts	Athletics	Men's 110 m hurdles	August 8
Silver	Anna Cockrell	Athletics	Women's 400 m hurdles	August 8
Silver	Spencer Lee	Wrestling	Men's freestyle 57 kg	August 9
Silver	Shelby McEwen	Athletics	Men's high jump	August 10
Silver	Nevin Harrison	Canoeing	Women's C-1 200 m	August 10
Silver	Brooke Raboutou	Sport climbing	Women's combined	August 10
Silver	United States women's national volleyball team: Lauren Carlini; Andrea Drews; Micha Hancock; Jordan Larson; Chiaka Ogbogu; Kathryn Plummer; Jordyn Poulter; Dana Rettke; Kelsey Robinson; Avery Skinner; Jordan Thompson; Haleigh Washington; Justine Wong-Orantes	Volleyball	Women's tournament	August 11
Silver	Kennedy Blades	Wrestling	Women's freestyle 76 kg	August 11
Bronze	Chloé Dygert	Cycling	Women's road time trial	July 27
Bronze	Katie Ledecky	Swimming	Women's 400 m freestyle	July 27
Bronze	Carson Foster	Swimming	Men's 400 m individual medley	July 28
Bronze	Nick Itkin	Fencing	Men's foil	July 29
Bronze	Asher Hong; Paul Juda; Brody Malone; Stephen Nedoroscik; Fred Richard	Gymnastics	Men's artistic team all-around	July 29
Bronze	Nyjah Huston	Skateboarding	Men's street	July 29
Bronze	Luke Hobson	Swimming	Men's 200 m freestyle	July 29
Bronze	Ryan Murphy	Swimming	Men's 100 m backstroke	July 29
Bronze	Emma Weyant	Swimming	Women's 400 m individual medley	July 29
Bronze	United States women's national rugby sevens team: Kayla Canett; Lauren Doyle; Alev Kelter; Kristi Kirshe; Sarah Levy; Ilona Maher; Alena Olsen; Ariana Ramsey; Stephanie Rovetti; Spiff Sedrick; Sammy Sullivan; Naya Tapper	Rugby sevens	Women's tournament	July 30
Bronze	Katharine Berkoff	Swimming	Women's 100 m backstroke	July 30
Bronze	Evy Leibfarth	Canoeing	Women's slalom C-1	July 31
Bronze	Sunisa Lee	Gymnastics	Women's artistic individual all-around	August 1
Bronze	Brady Ellison; Casey Kaufhold	Archery	Mixed team	August 2
Bronze	Grant Fisher	Athletics	Men's 10,000 m	August 2
Bronze	Ian Barrows; Hans Henken	Sailing	49er	August 2
Bronze	Melissa Jefferson	Athletics	Women's 100 m	August 3
Bronze	Jasmine Moore	Athletics	Women's triple jump	August 3
Bronze	Stephen Nedoroscik	Gymnastics	Men's pommel horse	August 3
Bronze	Jade Carey	Gymnastics	Women's vault	August 3
Bronze	Christopher Carlson; Peter Chatain; Clark Dean; Henry Hollingsworth; Rielly Milne (c); Evan Olson; Pieter Quinton; Nicholas Rusher; Christian Tabash	Rowing	Men's eight	August 3
Bronze	Paige Madden	Swimming	Women's 800 m freestyle	August 3
Bronze	Taylor Fritz; Tommy Paul	Tennis	Men's doubles	August 3
Bronze	Fred Kerley	Athletics	Men's 100 m	August 4
Bronze	Sunisa Lee	Gymnastics	Women's uneven bars	August 4
Bronze	Austen Smith	Shooting	Women's skeet	August 4
Bronze	United States women's national 3x3 team Cierra Burdick; Dearica Hamby; Rhyne Howard; Hailey Van Lith	Basketball	Women's 3x3 tournament	August 5
Bronze	Yared Nuguse	Athletics	Men's 1500 m	August 6
Bronze	Brittany Brown	Athletics	Women's 200 m	August 6
Bronze	Omari Jones	Boxing	Men's welterweight	August 6
Bronze	Hampton Morris	Weightlifting	Men's 61 kg	August 7
Bronze	Noah Lyles	Athletics	Men's 200 m	August 8
Bronze	Jasmine Moore	Athletics	Women's long jump	August 8
Bronze	Sam Watson	Sport climbing	Men's speed	August 8
Bronze	Kristina Teachout	Taekwondo	Women's 67 kg	August 9
Bronze	United States men's national volleyball team: Matt Anderson; Taylor Averill; Micah Christenson; TJ DeFalco; Maxwell Holt; Thomas Jaeschke; Jeffrey Jendryk; Micah Maʻa; Garrett Muagututia; Aaron Russell; Erik Shoji; David Smith	Volleyball	Men's tournament	August 9
Bronze	Aaron Brooks	Wrestling	Men's freestyle 86 kg	August 9
Bronze	Helen Maroulis	Wrestling	Women's freestyle 57 kg	August 9
Bronze	Grant Fisher	Athletics	Men's 5000 m	August 10
Bronze	Victor Montalvo	Breaking	B-Boys	August 10
Bronze	Kyle Dake	Wrestling	Men's freestyle 74 kg	August 10
Bronze	United States men's national water polo team: Alex Bowen; Luca Cupido; Hannes Daube; Chase Dodd; Ryder Dodd; Ben Hallock; Drew Holland; Johnny Hooper; Max Irving; Alex Obert; Marko Vavic; Adrian Weinberg; Dylan Woodhead	Water polo	Men's tournament	August 11

Medals by sport
Sport	1st place, gold medalist(s)	2nd place, silver medalist(s)	3rd place, bronze medalist(s)	Total
Athletics	14	11	9	**34**
Swimming	8	13	7	**28**
Cycling	3	2	1	**6**
Gymnastics	3	1	5	**9**
Wrestling	2	2	3	**7**
Fencing	2	1	1	**4**
Basketball	2	0	1	**3**
Shooting	1	3	1	**5**
Rowing	1	0	1	**2**
Weightlifting	1	0	1	**2**
Football	1	0	0	**1**
Golf	1	0	0	**1**
Surfing	1	0	0	**1**
Skateboarding	0	2	1	**3**
Archery	0	1	1	**2**
Canoeing	0	1	1	**2**
Sport climbing	0	1	1	**2**
Tennis	0	1	1	**2**
Volleyball	0	1	1	**2**
Artistic swimming	0	1	0	**1**
Diving	0	1	0	**1**
Equestrian	0	1	0	**1**
Triathlon	0	1	0	**1**
Boxing	0	0	1	**1**
Breaking	0	0	1	**1**
Rugby sevens	0	0	1	**1**
Sailing	0	0	1	**1**
Taekwondo	0	0	1	**1**
Water polo	0	0	1	**1**
Total	40	44	42	126

Medals by day
Day	Date	1st place, gold medalist(s)	2nd place, silver medalist(s)	3rd place, bronze medalist(s)	Total
1	July 27	1	2	2	**5**
2	July 28	2	4	1	**7**
3	July 29	0	2	6	**8**
4	July 30	1	3	2	**6**
5	July 31	1	2	1	**4**
6	August 1	4	2	1	**7**
7	August 2	0	3	3	**6**
8	August 3	5	6	7	**18**
9	August 4	5	2	3	**10**
10	August 5	2	4	1	**7**
11	August 6	3	1	3	**7**
12	August 7	3	4	1	**8**
13	August 8	3	3	3	**9**
14	August 9	3	1	4	**8**
15	August 10	5	3	3	**11**
16	August 11	2	2	1	**5**
Total		40	44	42	126

Medals by gender
Gender	1st place, gold medalist(s)	2nd place, silver medalist(s)	3rd place, bronze medalist(s)	Total
Female	26	24	18	**68**
Male	13	16	23	**52**
Mixed	1	4	1	**6**
Total	40	44	42	126

Multiple medalists
Name	Sport	1st place, gold medalist(s)	2nd place, silver medalist(s)	3rd place, bronze medalist(s)	Total
Torri Huske	Swimming	3	2	0	**5**
Regan Smith	Swimming	2	3	0	**5**
Simone Biles	Gymnastics	3	1	0	**4**
Kate Douglass	Swimming	2	2	0	**4**
Gretchen Walsh	Swimming	2	2	0	**4**
Katie Ledecky	Swimming	2	1	1	**4**
Gabby Thomas	Athletics	3	0	0	**3**
Caeleb Dressel	Swimming	2	1	0	**3**
Nic Fink	Swimming	1	2	0	**3**
Ryan Murphy	Swimming	1	1	1	**3**
Sunisa Lee	Gymnastics	1	0	2	**3**
Rai Benjamin	Athletics	2	0	0	**2**
Kristen Faulkner	Cycling	2	0	0	**2**
Lee Kiefer	Fencing	2	0	0	**2**
Sydney McLaughlin-Levrone	Athletics	2	0	0	**2**
Jennifer Valente	Cycling	2	0	0	**2**
Jack Alexy	Swimming	1	1	0	**2**
Hunter Armstrong	Swimming	1	1	0	**2**
Kaylyn Brown	Athletics	1	1	0	**2**
Bryce Deadmon	Athletics	1	1	0	**2**
Bobby Finke	Swimming	1	1	0	**2**
Chris Guiliano	Swimming	1	1	0	**2**
Vincent Hancock	Shooting	1	1	0	**2**
Shamier Little	Athletics	1	1	0	**2**
Vernon Norwood	Athletics	1	1	0	**2**
Sha'Carri Richardson	Athletics	1	1	0	**2**
Lauren Scruggs	Fencing	1	1	0	**2**
Alex Shackell	Swimming	1	1	0	**2**
Charlie Swanson	Swimming	1	1	0	**2**
Abbey Weitzeil	Swimming	1	1	0	**2**
Katharine Berkoff	Swimming	1	0	1	**2**
Jade Carey	Gymnastics	1	0	1	**2**
Chloé Dygert	Cycling	1	0	1	**2**
Melissa Jefferson	Athletics	1	0	1	**2**
Noah Lyles	Athletics	1	0	1	**2**
Simone Manuel	Swimming	0	2	0	**2**
Brady Ellison	Archery	0	1	1	**2**
Carson Foster	Swimming	0	1	1	**2**
Luke Hobson	Swimming	0	1	1	**2**
Paige Madden	Swimming	0	1	1	**2**
Austen Smith	Shooting	0	1	1	**2**
Grant Fisher	Athletics	0	0	2	**2**
Jasmine Moore	Athletics	0	0	2	**2**
Stephen Nedoroscik	Gymnastics	0	0	2	**2**

^{a} Athletes who participated in the heats only.

== Competitors ==
On July 10, 2024, the United States Olympic & Paralympic Committee announced the 592 athletes (314 women and 278 men) that had qualified for and would compete at the 2024 Paris Olympics.

The following is the list of number of competitors in the Games. Note that reserves in soccer are not counted:

Sport	Men	Women	Total
Archery	1	3	4
Artistic swimming	0	8	8
Athletics	59	61	120
Badminton	3	4	7
Basketball	16	16	32
Boxing	4	4	8
Breaking	2	2	4
Canoeing	3	2	5
Cycling	10	13	23
Diving	5	6	11
Equestrian	6	3	9
Fencing	6	9	15
Field hockey	0	16	16
Football	18	18	36
Golf	4	3	7
Gymnastics	6	7	12
Judo	2	2	4
Modern pentathlon	0	1	1
Rowing	18	24	42
Rugby sevens	12	12	24
Sailing	6	7	13
Shooting	7	9	16
Skateboarding	6	6	12
Sport climbing	4	4	8
Surfing	2	3	5
Swimming	27	21	48
Table tennis	1	3	4
Taekwondo	2	2	4
Tennis	6	5	11
Triathlon	2	3	5
Volleyball	16	16	32
Water polo	12	12	24
Weightlifting	2	3	5
Wrestling	10	6	16
Total	278	314	592

== Archery ==
Four American archers qualified for the men's and women's individual recurve by virtue of their respective result at the 2023 World Championships in Berlin, Germany; 2023 Pan American Games in Santiago, Chile; and 2024 Pan American Championships in Medellín, Colombia.

The team includes Olympic medalist Brady Ellison and women's world number one Casey Kaufhold.

Athlete	Event	Ranking round		Round of 64	Round of 32	Round of 16	Quarterfinals	Semifinals	Final / BM	
Athlete	Event	Score	Seed	Opposition Score	Opposition Score	Opposition Score	Opposition Score	Opposition Score	Opposition Score	Rank
Brady Ellison	Men's individual	677	7	Yıldırmış (TUR); W 6–2	Kao (CHN); W 6–2	Tümer (TUR); W 6–2	Kim J-d (KOR); W 6–0	Unruh (GER); W 7–3	Kim W-j (KOR); L 5–6	2nd place, silver medalist(s)
Catalina GNoriega	Women's individual	648	38	Bauer (GER); W 6–0	Choirunisa (INA); L 5–6	Did not advance				
Casey Kaufhold	Women's individual	672	4	Sylla (GUI); W 6–2	Lei (TPE); L 3–7	Did not advance				
Jennifer Mucino-Fernandez	Women's individual	625	57	Valencia (MEX); L 2–6	Did not advance					
Catalina GNoriega; Casey Kaufhold; Jennifer Mucino-Fernandez	Women's team	1945	8	—N/a		Chinese Taipei; L 1–5	Did not advance			
Brady Ellison; Casey Kaufhold	Mixed team	1349	3 Q	—N/a		Uzbekistan; W 6–0	Japan; W 5–3	Germany; L 3–5	India; W 6–2	3rd place, bronze medalist(s)

== Artistic swimming ==
The United States got the opportunity to field a full-squad of eight artistic swimmers to compete in the open team and women's duet events by topping the list of five highest-ranked nations at the 2024 World Aquatics Championships in Doha, Qatar.

The full team was announced on June 8, 2024, and featured three-time Olympian Anita Alvarez among the roster of Olympic debutants.

Athlete	Event	Technical routine		Free routine			Acrobatic routine		
Athlete	Event	Points	Rank	Points	Total (technical + free)	Rank	Points	Total (technical + free + acrobatic)	Rank
Jaime Czarkowski; Megumi Field	Duet	230.7134	11	254.0354	484.7488	10	—N/a		
Anita Alvarez; Jaime Czarkowski; Megumi Field; Keana Hunter; Audrey Kwon; Jacklyn Luu; Daniella Ramirez; Ruby Remati	Team	282.7567	4	360.2688	643.0255	2	271.3166	914.3421	2nd place, silver medalist(s)

== Athletics (track and field) ==
U.S. track and field athletes have achieved the entry standards for Paris 2024 either by passing the direct qualifying mark (or time for track and road races) or by virtue of their world ranking in the events listed in the table (a maximum of three athletes each per country). The men's head coach was Stanley Redwine and the women's head coach was LaTanya Sheffield.

To assure their selection to the team, athletes competed in the 2024 U.S. Olympic Trials on June 21–30, 2024, in Eugene, Oregon. On July 9, 2024, USA Track & Field officially announced the final roster of 120 athletes (59 men and 61 women) qualified for the 2024 U.S. Olympic track and field team.

16-year-old Quincy Wilson was selected for the 4x400-meter relay team, becoming the youngest male U.S. track athlete in history.

Key

- Note–Ranks given for track events are within the athlete's heat only
- Q = Qualified for the next round
- q = Qualified for the next round as a fastest loser or, in field events, by position without achieving the qualifying target
- R = Qualified for the repechage round
- NR = National record
- N/A = Round not applicable for the event
- Bye = Athlete not required to compete in round

Track and road events
Men

Athlete	Event	Preliminary		Heat		Repechage		Semifinal		Final	
Athlete	Event	Time	Rank	Time	Rank	Time	Rank	Time	Rank	Time	Rank
Kenneth Bednarek	100 m	Bye		9.97	1 Q	—N/a		9.93	4 q	9.88	7
Fred Kerley	100 m	Bye		9.97	1 Q	—N/a		9.84	2 Q	9.81	3rd place, bronze medalist(s)
Noah Lyles	100 m	Bye		10.04	2 Q	—N/a		9.83	2 Q	9.79 (.784)	1st place, gold medalist(s)
Kenneth Bednarek	200 m	—N/a		19.96	1 Q	Bye		20.00	1 Q	19.62	2nd place, silver medalist(s)
Erriyon Knighton	200 m	—N/a		19.99	1 Q	Bye		20.09	1 Q	19.99	4
Noah Lyles	200 m	—N/a		20.19	1 Q	Bye		20.08	2 Q	19.70	3rd place, bronze medalist(s)
Christopher Bailey	400 m	—N/a		44.89	2 Q	Bye		44.31	3 q	44.58	6
Quincy Hall	400 m	—N/a		44.28	1 Q	Bye		43.95	1 Q	43.40	1st place, gold medalist(s)
Michael Norman	400 m	—N/a		44.10	1 Q	Bye		44.26	2 Q	45.62	8
Bryce Hoppel	800 m	—N/a		1:45.24	2 Q	Bye		1:43.41	2 Q	1:41.67 NR	4
Hobbs Kessler	800 m	—N/a		1:46.15	3 Q	Bye		1:46.20	6	Did not advance	
Brandon Miller	800 m	—N/a		1:46.34	8 R	1:44.21	1 Q	1:45.79	5	Did not advance	
Cole Hocker	1500 m	—N/a		3:35.27	2 Q	Bye		3:32.54	3 Q	3:27.65 OR	1st place, gold medalist(s)
Hobbs Kessler	1500 m	—N/a		3:36.87	2 Q	Bye		3:31.97	2 Q	3:29.45	5
Yared Nuguse	1500 m	—N/a		3:36.56	5 Q	Bye		3:31.72	1 Q	3:27.80	3rd place, bronze medalist(s)
Graham Blanks	5000 m	—N/a		14:09.06	6 Q	—N/a				13:18.67	9
Grant Fisher	5000 m	—N/a		13:52.44	4 Q	—N/a				13:15.13	3rd place, bronze medalist(s)
Abdihamid Nur	5000 m	—N/a		14:15.00	19	—N/a				Did not advance	
Grant Fisher	10000 m	—N/a								26:43.46	3rd place, bronze medalist(s)
Woody Kincaid	10000 m	—N/a								27:29.40	16
Nico Young	10000 m	—N/a								26:58.11	12
Freddie Crittenden	110 m hurdles	—N/a		18.27	8 R	13.42	1 Q	13.23	2 Q	13.32	6
Grant Holloway	110 m hurdles	—N/a		13.01	1 Q	Bye		12.98	1 Q	12.99	1st place, gold medalist(s)
Daniel Roberts	110 m hurdles	—N/a		13.43	3 Q	Bye		13.10	2 Q	13.09 (.085)	2nd place, silver medalist(s)
CJ Allen	400 m hurdles	—N/a		48.64	2 Q	Bye		48.44	4	Did not advance	
Trevor Bassitt	400 m hurdles	—N/a		49.38	5 R	48.64	1 Q	48.29	4	Did not advance	
Rai Benjamin	400 m hurdles	—N/a		48.82	1 Q	Bye		47.85	1 Q	46.46	1st place, gold medalist(s)
James Corrigan	3000 m steeplechase	—N/a		8:36.67	10	—N/a				Did not advance	
Kenneth Rooks	3000 m steeplechase	—N/a		8:24.95	2 Q	—N/a				8:06.41	2nd place, silver medalist(s)
Matthew Wilkinson	3000 m steeplechase	—N/a		8:16.82	6	—N/a				Did not advance	
Kenny Bednarek; Christian Coleman; Fred Kerley; Kyree King; Courtney Lindsey^{[c]}	4 × 100 m relay	—N/a		37.47	1 Q	—N/a				DQ	
Chris Bailey; Rai Benjamin; Bryce Deadmon; Vernon Norwood; Quincy Wilson^{[c]}	4 × 400 m relay	—N/a		2:59.15	3 Q	—N/a				2:54.43 OR	1st place, gold medalist(s)
Leonard Korir	Marathon	—N/a								2:18:45	63
Conner Mantz	Marathon	—N/a								2:08:12	8
Clayton Young	Marathon	—N/a								2:08:44	9

Women

Athlete	Event	Preliminary		Heat		Repechage		Semifinal		Final	
Athlete	Event	Time	Rank	Time	Rank	Time	Rank	Time	Rank	Time	Rank
Melissa Jefferson	100 m	Bye		10.96	2 Q	—N/a		10.99	1 Q	10.92	3rd place, bronze medalist(s)
Sha'Carri Richardson	100 m	Bye		10.94	1 Q	—N/a		10.89	2 Q	10.87	2nd place, silver medalist(s)
Twanisha Terry	100 m	Bye		11.15	1 Q	—N/a		11.07	3 q	10.97	5
Brittany Brown	200 m	—N/a		22.38	1 Q	Bye		22.12	1 Q	22.20	3rd place, bronze medalist(s)
McKenzie Long	200 m	—N/a		22.55	1 Q	Bye		22.30	3 q	22.42	7
Gabrielle Thomas	200 m	—N/a		22.20	1 Q	Bye		21.86	1 Q	21.83	1st place, gold medalist(s)
Aaliyah Butler	400 m	—N/a		50.52	2 Q	Bye		51.18	6	Did not advance	
Kendall Ellis	400 m	—N/a		51.16	5 R	50.44	1 Q	50.40	4	Did not advance	
Alexis Holmes	400 m	—N/a		50.35	2 Q	Bye		50.00	2 Q	49.77	6
Nia Akins	800 m	—N/a		1:59.67	2 Q	Bye		1:58.20	3	Did not advance	
Juliette Whittaker	800 m	—N/a		2:00.45	3 Q	Bye		1:57.76	3 q	1:58.50	7
Allie Wilson	800 m	—N/a		1:59.69	6 R	1:59.73	3	Did not advance			
Nikki Hiltz	1500 m	—N/a		4:00.42	3 Q	Bye		3:56.17	3 Q	3:56.38	7
Emily Mackay	1500 m	—N/a		3:59.63	6 Q	Bye		4:02.03	13	Did not advance	
Elle St. Pierre	1500 m	—N/a		4:03.22	3 Q	Bye		3:59.74	3 Q	3:57.52	8
Elise Cranny	5000 m	—N/a		14:58.55	7 Q	—N/a				14:48.06	10
Whittni Morgan	5000 m	—N/a		15:02.14	6 Q	—N/a				14:53.57	13
Karissa Schweizer	5000 m	—N/a		14:59.64	8 Q	—N/a				14:45.57	9
Weini Kelati	10000 m	—N/a								30:49.98	8
Karissa Schweizer	10000 m	—N/a								30:51.99	9
Parker Valby	10000 m	—N/a								30:59.28	11
Alaysha Johnson	100 m hurdles	—N/a		12.61	2 Q	Bye		12.34	1 Q	12.93	7
Masai Russell	100 m hurdles	—N/a		12.53	=1 Q	Bye		12.42	2 Q	12.33	1st place, gold medalist(s)
Grace Stark	100 m hurdles	—N/a		12.72	3 Q	Bye		12.39	1 Q	12.43	5
Anna Cockrell	400 m hurdles	—N/a		53.91	1 Q	Bye		52.90	2 Q	51.87	2nd place, silver medalist(s)
Jasmine Jones	400 m hurdles	—N/a		53.60	1 Q	Bye		53.83	2 Q	52.29	4
Sydney McLaughlin-Levrone	400 m hurdles	—N/a		53.60	1 Q	Bye		52.13	1 Q	50.37 WR	1st place, gold medalist(s)
Valerie Constien	3000 m steeplechase	—N/a		9:16.33	3 Q	—N/a				9:34.08	15
Marisa Howard	3000 m steeplechase	—N/a		9:24.78	7	—N/a				Did not advance	
Courtney Wayment	3000 m steeplechase	—N/a		9:10.72	4 Q	—N/a				9:13.60	12
Melissa Jefferson; Sha'Carri Richardson; Twanisha Terry; Gabrielle Thomas	4 × 100 m relay	—N/a		41.94	1 Q	—N/a				41.78	1st place, gold medalist(s)
Kaylyn Brown^{[c]} Aaliyah Butler^{[c]} Quanera Hayes^{[c]} Alexis Holmes; Shamier Little; Sydney McLaughlin-Levrone; Gabrielle Thomas	4 × 400 m relay	—N/a		3:21.44	1 Q	—N/a				3:15.27 AM	1st place, gold medalist(s)
Dakotah Lindwurm	Marathon	—N/a								2:25:44	12
Fiona O'Keeffe	Marathon	—N/a								DNF	
Emily Sisson	Marathon	—N/a								2:29:53	23

Mixed

Athlete	Event	Heat		Final	
Athlete	Event	Time	Rank	Time	Rank
Kaylyn Brown; Bryce Deadmon; Shamier Little; Vernon Norwood	4 × 400 m relay	3:07.41 WR	1 Q	3:07.74	2nd place, silver medalist(s)

^{c} Athletes who participated in the heats only.

Field events
Men

Athlete	Event	Qualification		Final	
Athlete	Event	Result	Rank	Result	Rank
Malcolm Clemons	Long jump	7.72	21	Did not advance	
Jeremiah Davis	Long jump	7.83	15	Did not advance	
Jarrion Lawson	Long jump	NM		Did not advance	
Salif Mane	Triple jump	17.16	=3 Q	17.41	6
Russell Robinson	Triple jump	16.47	22	Did not advance	
Donald Scott	Triple jump	16.77	14	Did not advance	
JuVaughn Harrison	High jump	2.20	=19	Did not advance	
Shelby McEwen	High jump	2.27	1 q	2.36	2nd place, silver medalist(s)
Vernon Turner	High jump	2.15	28	Did not advance	
Sam Kendricks	Pole vault	5.75	8 q	5.95	2nd place, silver medalist(s)
Chris Nilsen	Pole vault	5.40	=26	Did not advance	
Jacob Wooten	Pole vault	5.60	22	Did not advance	
Ryan Crouser	Shot put	21.49	4 Q	22.90	1st place, gold medalist(s)
Joe Kovacs	Shot put	21.24	7 q	22.15	2nd place, silver medalist(s)
Payton Otterdahl	Shot put	21.52	3 Q	22.03	4
Joseph Brown	Discus throw	61.68	22	Did not advance	
Andrew Evans	Discus throw	62.25	17	Did not advance	
Sam Mattis	Discus throw	62.66	14	Did not advance	
Curtis Thompson	Javelin throw	76.79	27	Did not advance	
Daniel Haugh	Hammer throw	NM		Did not advance	
Rudy Winkler	Hammer throw	77.29	4 Q	77.92	6

Women

Athlete	Event	Qualification		Final	
Athlete	Event	Distance	Position	Distance	Position
Tara Davis-Woodhall	Long jump	6.90	1 Q	7.10	1st place, gold medalist(s)
Jasmine Moore	Long jump	6.66	6 q	6.96	3rd place, bronze medalist(s)
Monae' Nichols	Long jump	6.64	8 q	6.67	6
Tori Franklin	Triple jump	14.02	14	Did not advance	
Jasmine Moore	Triple jump	14.43	3 Q	14.67	3rd place, bronze medalist(s)
Keturah Orji	Triple jump	14.09	11 q	14.05	9
Vashti Cunningham	High jump	1.92	=12 q	1.95	5
Rachel Glenn	High jump	1.88	=15	Did not advance	
Brynn King	Pole vault	4.40	=22	Did not advance	
Katie Moon	Pole vault	4.55	=1 q	4.85	2nd place, silver medalist(s)
Bridget Williams	Pole vault	4.40	=22	Did not advance	
Chase Jackson	Shot put	17.60	17	Did not advance	
Jaida Ross	Shot put	18.58	8 q	19.28	4
Raven Saunders	Shot put	18.62	7 q	17.79	11
Valarie Allman	Discus throw	69.59	1 Q	69.50	1st place, gold medalist(s)
Veronica Fraley	Discus throw	62.54	13	Did not advance	
Jayden Ulrich	Discus throw	61.08	18	Did not advance	
Maggie Malone-Hardin	Javelin throw	58.76	24	Did not advance	
Annette Echikunwoke	Hammer throw	73.52	4 Q	75.48	2nd place, silver medalist(s)
DeAnna Price	Hammer throw	73.79	3 Q	71.00	11
Erin Reese	Hammer throw	70.23	14	Did not advance	

Combined event – Men's decathlon

Athlete	Event	100 m	LJ	SP	HJ	400 m	110H	DT	PV	JT	1500 m	Final	Rank
Heath Baldwin	Result	10.91	7.38	14.48	2.17	49.04	14.04	43.66	4.70	67.59	4:40.67	8422	10
Heath Baldwin	Points	881	905	758	963	859	969	739	819	853	676	8422	10
Harrison Williams	Result	10.62	7.42	15.66	1.96	46.71	14.28	46.91	5.10	51.17	4:19.58	8538	7
Harrison Williams	Points	947	915	830	767	973	939	806	941	606	814	8538	7
Zach Ziemek	Result	10.60	6.86	15.03	1.96	50.79	15.11	50.08	5.00	57.05	4:53.17	7983	17
Zach Ziemek	Points	952	781	792	767	779	836	872	910	694	600	7983	17

Combined event – Women's heptathlon

Athlete	Event	100H	HJ	SP	200 m	LJ	JT	800 m	Final	Rank
Taliyah Brooks	Result	13.00	1.77	13.58	24.02	6.15	38.76	2:13.95	6258	11
Taliyah Brooks	Points	1124	941	766	979	896	644	908	6258	11
Anna Hall	Result	13.36	1.89	14.11	23.89	5.93	45.99	2:04.39	6615	5
Anna Hall	Points	1071	1093	801	991	828	783	1048	6615	5
Chari Hawkins	Result	13.16	NM	13.64	24.49	5.90	44.30	2:15.76	5255	21
Chari Hawkins	Points	1100	0	770	934	819	750	882	5255	21

== Badminton ==
The United States qualified seven badminton players into the Olympic tournament based on the BWF Race to Paris Rankings.

Athlete	Event	Group stage					Elimination	Quarter-final	Semi-final	Final / BM	
Athlete	Event	Opposition Score	Opposition Score	Opposition Score	Opposition Score	Rank	Opposition Score	Opposition Score	Opposition Score	Opposition Score	Rank
Howard Shu	Men's singles	Ginting (INA); L (14–21, 8–21)	Popov (FRA); L (11–21, 12–21)	—N/a		3	Did not advance				
Vinson Chiu; Joshua Yuan	Men's doubles	Astrup / Rasmussen (DEN); L (13–21, 16–21)	Liu / Ou (CHN); L (13–21, 14–21)	Hoki / Kobayashi (JPN); L (11–21, 12–21)	Lee / Wang (TPE); L (12–21, 13–21)	5	—N/a	Did not advance			
Beiwen Zhang	Women's singles	Ho (AUS); W (21–9, 21–4)	Nguyễn (VIE); W (22–20, 22–20)	—N/a		1 Q	Marín (ESP); L (21–12, 9–21, 18–21)	Did not advance			
Annie Xu; Kerry Xu	Women's doubles	Liu / Tan (CHN); L (11–21, 14–21)	Yeung NT / Yeung PL (HKG); L (22–24, 21–17, 12–21)	G Stoeva / S Stoeva (BUL); L (18–21, 12–21)	—N/a	4	—N/a	Did not advance			
Vinson Chiu; Jennie Gai	Mixed doubles	Feng / Huang (CHN); L (11–21, 14–21)	Chen / Toh (MAS); L (15–21, 22–24)	Hee / Tan (SGP); L (17–21, 12–21)	—N/a	4	—N/a	Did not advance			

== Basketball ==
=== 5×5 basketball ===
Summary

Team	Event	Group stage				Quarterfinal	Semifinal	Final / BM	
Team	Event	Opposition Score	Opposition Score	Opposition Score	Rank	Opposition Score	Opposition Score	Opposition Score	Rank
United States men	Men's tournament	Serbia; W 110–84	South Sudan; W 103–86	Puerto Rico; W 104–83	1 Q	Brazil; W 122–87	Serbia; W 95–91	France; W 98–87	1st place, gold medalist(s)
United States women	Women's tournament	Japan; W 102–76	Belgium; W 87–74	Germany; W 87–68	1 Q	Nigeria; W 88–74	Australia; W 85–64	France; W 67–66	1st place, gold medalist(s)

==== Men's tournament ====
The U.S. men's basketball team qualified for the Olympics by virtue of being one of the two highest-ranked teams from the Americas, securing its berth at the 2023 FIBA World Cup in Indonesia-Japan-Philippines.

Team roster
On January 24, 2024, USA Basketball announced a 41 potential athletes for the 2024 Olympic team. The team is led by head coach Steve Kerr and assisted by Mark Few, Tyronn Lue, and Erik Spoelstra. The final roster was named on April 17, 2024. This would be the fourth Olympic tournament for then- three-time Olympic gold medalist Kevin Durant and then- two-time Olympic gold medalist LeBron James, while Stephen Curry would make his Olympic debut. On July 10, 2024, Kawhi Leonard withdrew from the team due to injury and was replaced by Derrick White.

United States men's national basketball team – 2024 Summer Olympics roster
Players
Coaches

Pos.	No.	Name	Age – Date of birth	Height	Club	Ctr.
PG	4	Stephen Curry	36 – 14 March 1988	1.88 m (6 ft 2 in)	Golden State Warriors	(United States)
SG	5	Anthony Edwards	22 – 5 August 2001	1.93 m (6 ft 4 in)	Minnesota Timberwolves	(United States)
F	6	LeBron James (C)	39 – 30 December 1984	2.06 m (6 ft 9 in)	Los Angeles Lakers	(United States)
F	7	Kevin Durant	35 – 29 September 1988	2.11 m (6 ft 11 in)	Phoenix Suns	(United States)
G	8	Derrick White	30 – 2 July 1994	1.93 m (6 ft 4 in)	Boston Celtics	(United States)
PG	9	Tyrese Haliburton	24 – 29 February 2000	1.96 m (6 ft 5 in)	Indiana Pacers	(United States)
F	10	Jayson Tatum	26 – 3 March 1998	2.03 m (6 ft 8 in)	Boston Celtics	(United States)
C	11	Joel Embiid	30 – 16 March 1994	2.13 m (7 ft 0 in)	Philadelphia 76ers	(United States)
G	12	Jrue Holiday	34 – 12 June 1990	1.93 m (6 ft 4 in)	Boston Celtics	(United States)
F/C	13	Bam Adebayo	27 – 18 July 1997	2.06 m (6 ft 9 in)	Miami Heat	(United States)
F/C	14	Anthony Davis	31 – 11 March 1993	2.08 m (6 ft 10 in)	Los Angeles Lakers	(United States)
SG	15	Devin Booker	27 – 30 October 1996	1.98 m (6 ft 6 in)	Phoenix Suns	(United States)

Head coach

- (United States) Steve Kerr

Assistant coach(es)

- (United States) Mark Few
- (United States) Tyronn Lue
- (United States) Erik Spoelstra

Legend

- (C) Team captain
- Club – describes last
  club before the tournament
- Age – describes age
  on 27 July 2024

Roster

Group play

Pos	Team	Pld	W	L	PF	PA	PD	Pts	Qualification
1	United States	3	3	0	317	253	+64	6	Quarterfinals
2	Serbia	3	2	1	287	261	+26	5	Quarterfinals
3	South Sudan	3	1	2	261	278	−17	4	
4	Puerto Rico	3	0	3	228	301	−73	3	

Source: FIBA
Rules for classification: 1) classification points; 2) head-to-head results; 3) head-to-head game points difference; 4) head-to-head number of game points scored.

28 July 2024
17:15

Report

Serbia	84–110	United States
Scoring by quarter: 20–25, 29–33, 16–26, 19–26
Pts: Jokić 20; Rebs: Bogdanović 6 Asts: Jokić 8		Pts: Durant 23; Rebs: Davis 8 Asts: James 9

Stade Pierre-Mauroy, Lille
Attendance: 27,328
Referees: Yohan Rosso (FRA), Julio Anaya (PAN), Mārtiņš Kozlovskis (LAT)

31 July 2024
21:00

Report

United States	103–86	South Sudan
Scoring by quarter: 26–14, 29–22, 18–21, 30–29
Pts: Adebayo 18; Rebs: three players 7 Asts: Booker 6		Pts: Omot 24; Rebs: Gabriel 10; Asts: Jones 7

Stade Pierre-Mauroy, Lille
Attendance: 27,056
Referees: Antonio Conde (ESP), Mārtiņš Kozlovskis (LAT), Takaki Kato (JPN)

3 August 2024
17:15

Report

Puerto Rico	83–104	United States
Scoring by quarter: 29–25, 16–39, 14–23, 24–17
Pts: Alvarado 18; Rebs: Romero 10; Asts: Conditt IV 5		Pts: Edwards 26; Rebs: Tatum 10; Asts: James 8

Stade Pierre-Mauroy, Lille
Attendance: 27,244
Referees: Julio Anaya (PAN), Gatis Saliņš (LAT), Martin Vulić (CRO)

Quarterfinal

6 August 2024
21:30

Report

Brazil	87–122	United States
Scoring by quarter: 21–33, 15–30, 35–31, 16–28
Pts: Caboclo 30; Rebs: Georginho 8 Asts: Meindl 7		Pts: Booker 18; Rebs: Davis 8 Asts: James 9

Accor Arena, Paris
Attendance: 12,364
Referees: Antonio Conde (ESP), Luis Castillo (ESP), Yevgeniy Mikheyev (KAZ)

Semifinal

8 August 2024
21:00

Report

United States	95–91	Serbia
Scoring by quarter: 23–31, 20–23, 20–22, 32–15
Pts: Curry 36; Rebs: James 12; Asts: James 10		Pts: Bogdanović 20; Rebs: three players 5 Asts: Jokić 11

Accor Arena, Paris
Attendance: 12,213
Referees: Ademir Zurapović (BIH), Julio Anaya (PAN), Mārtiņš Kozlovskis (LAT)

Gold medal game

10 August 2024
21:30

Report

France	87–98	United States
Scoring by quarter: 15–20, 26–29, 25–23, 21–26
Pts: Wembanyama 26; Rebs: Batum 8 Asts: Batum 4		Pts: Curry 24; Rebs: Davis 9 Asts: James 10

Accor Arena, Paris
Attendance: 12,121
Referees: Antonio Conde (ESP), Julio Anaya (PAN), Wojciech Liszka (POL)

==== Women's tournament ====
The U.S. women's basketball team qualified for the Olympics by winning the gold medal and securing an outright berth at the 2022 FIBA Women's World Cup in Sydney, Australia.

Team roster
The head coach was Cheryl Reeve. On February 14, 2024, USA Basketball that her assistant coaches would be Cheryl Reeve Mike Thibault, Kara Lawson, and Joni Taylor. The final roster was announced on June 17, 2024. Diana Taurasi became the first basketball player in history to compete at six Olympic tournaments.

United States women's national basketball team – 2024 Summer Olympics roster
Players
Coaches

Pos.	No.	Name	Age – Date of birth	Height	Club	Ctr.
G	4	Jewell Loyd	30 – 5 October 1993	1.78 m (5 ft 10 in)	Seattle Storm	(United States)
G	5	Kelsey Plum	29 – 24 August 1994	1.73 m (5 ft 8 in)	Las Vegas Aces	(United States)
G	6	Sabrina Ionescu	26 – 6 December 1997	1.80 m (5 ft 11 in)	New York Liberty	(United States)
SF	7	Kahleah Copper	29 – 28 August 1994	1.85 m (6 ft 1 in)	Phoenix Mercury	(United States)
G	8	Chelsea Gray	31 – 8 October 1992	1.80 m (5 ft 11 in)	Las Vegas Aces	(United States)
C	9	A'ja Wilson	27 – 8 August 1996	1.91 m (6 ft 3 in)	Las Vegas Aces	(United States)
PF	10	Breanna Stewart	29 – 27 August 1994	1.91 m (6 ft 3 in)	New York Liberty	(United States)
SF	11	Napheesa Collier	27 – 23 September 1996	1.86 m (6 ft 1 in)	Minnesota Lynx	(United States)
G	12	Diana Taurasi	42 – 11 June 1982	1.82 m (6 ft 0 in)	Phoenix Mercury	(United States)
G	13	Jackie Young	26 – 16 September 1997	1.83 m (6 ft 0 in)	Las Vegas Aces	(United States)
PF	14	Alyssa Thomas	32 – 12 April 1992	1.88 m (6 ft 2 in)	Connecticut Sun	(United States)
C	15	Brittney Griner	33 – 18 October 1990	2.03 m (6 ft 8 in)	Phoenix Mercury	(United States)

Head coach

- (United States) Cheryl Reeve

Assistant coach(es)

- (United States) Kara Lawson
- (United States) Joni Taylor
- (United States) Mike Thibault

Legend

- (C) Team captain
- Club – describes last
  club before the tournament
- Age – describes age
  on 28 July 2024

Group play

Pos	Team	Pld	W	L	PF	PA	PD	Pts	Qualification
1	United States	3	3	0	276	218	+58	6	Quarterfinals
2	Germany	3	2	1	226	220	+6	5	Quarterfinals
3	Belgium	3	1	2	228	228	0	4	Quarterfinals
4	Japan	3	0	3	198	262	−64	3	

Source: FIBA
Rules for classification: 1) classification points; 2) head-to-head results; 3) head-to-head game points difference; 4) head-to-head number of game points scored.

29 July 2024
21:00

Report

United States	102–76	Japan
Scoring by quarter: 22–15, 28–24, 29–18, 23–19
Pts: Wilson 24; Rebs: Wilson 13; Asts: Gray 13		Pts: Takada 24; Rebs: four players 3 Asts: Machida, Yamamoto 5

Stade Pierre-Mauroy, Lille
Attendance: 13,040
Referees: Luis Castillo (ESP), Viola Györgyi (NOR), Yevgeniy Mikheyev (KAZ)

1 August 2024
21:00

Report

Belgium	74–87	United States
Scoring by quarter: 23–23, 15–23, 15–14, 21–27
Pts: Meesseman 24; Rebs: Delaere, Linskens 5 Asts: Delaere 8		Pts: Stewart 26; Rebs: Wilson 13; Asts: Ionescu 5

Stade Pierre-Mauroy, Lille
Attendance: 25,044
Referees: Wojciech Liszka (POL), Luis Castillo (ESP), Ariadna Chueca (ESP)

4 August 2024
17:15

Report

Germany	68–87	United States
Scoring by quarter: 19–16, 10–25, 17–28, 22–18
Pts: S. Sabally 15; Rebs: Geiselsöder 8 Asts: Peterson 4		Pts: Young 19; Rebs: Collier 7 Asts: three players 5

Stade Pierre-Mauroy, Lille
Attendance: 25,844
Referees: Julio Anaya (PAN), Gatis Saliņš (LAT), Viola Györgyi (NOR)

Quarterfinal

7 August 2024
21:30

Report

Nigeria	74–88	United States
Scoring by quarter: 17–26, 16–26, 15–24, 26–12
Pts: Amukamara 19; Rebs: Kunaiyi-Akpannah 8 Asts: Kalu 7		Pts: Wilson 20; Rebs: Wilson 11; Asts: Thomas 6

Accor Arena, Paris
Attendance: 12,437
Referees: Viola Györgyi (NOR), Juan Fernández (ARG), Yann Davidson (MAD)

Semifinal

9 August 2024
17:30

Report

United States	85–64	Australia
Scoring by quarter: 20–16, 25–11, 21–13, 19–24
Pts: Young 14; Rebs: Wilson 8 Asts: three players 5		Pts: Borlase 11; Rebs: Smith 7 Asts: three players 3

Accor Arena, Paris
Attendance: 11,919
Referees: Gatis Saliņš (LAT), Viola Györgyi (NOR), Péter Praksch (HUN)

Gold medal game

11 August 2024
15:30

Report

France	66–67	United States
Scoring by quarter: 9–15, 16–10, 18–20, 23–22
Pts: Williams 19; Rebs: Williams 7 Asts: Badiane 3		Pts: Wilson 21; Rebs: Wilson 13; Asts: Gray, Plum 4

Accor Arena, Paris
Attendance: 12,126
Referees: Boris Krejić (SLO), Viola Györgyi (NOR), Martin Vulić (CRO)

=== 3×3 basketball ===
Summary

Team	Event	Group stage								Play-in game	Semifinal	Final / BM	
Team	Event	Opposition Score	Opposition Score	Opposition Score	Opposition Score	Opposition Score	Opposition Score	Opposition Score	Rank	Opposition Score	Opposition Score	Opposition Score	Rank
United States men	Men's tournament	Serbia; L 14–22	Poland; L 17–19	Lithuania; L 18–20	Latvia; L 19–21	France; W 21–19	China; W 21–17	Netherlands; L 6–21	7	Did not advance			
United States women	Women's tournament	Germany; L 13–17	Azerbaijan; L 17–20	Australia; L 15–17	Spain; W 17–11	France; W 14–13	Canada; W 18–17 (OT)	China; W 14–12	3 PI	China; W 21–13	Spain; L 16–18 (OT)	Bronze medal final Canada; W 16–13	3rd place, bronze medalist(s)

==== Men's tournament ====
The U.S. men's 3x3 team qualified for its first Olympics as one of the three highest-ranked teams in the world. On February 8, 2024, USA Basketball announced that the coach would be Joe Lewandowski and the assistant coach would be James Fraschilla.

Head coach

- Joe Lewandowski

Assistant coach

- James Fraschilla

Team roster

The final roster was revealed on March 26, 2024 and included:

- Canyon Barry
- Jimmer Fredette
- Kareem Maddox
- Dylan Travis

Group play

Pos	Team	Pld	W	L	PF	PA	PD	Qualification
1	Latvia	7	7	0	147	103	+44	Semifinals
2	Netherlands	7	5	2	133	112	+21	Semifinals
3	Lithuania	7	4 (Note: Lithuania 20–18 Serbia)	3	134	125	+9	Play-ins
4	Serbia	7	4	3	129	123	+6	Play-ins
5	France (H)	7	3	4	131	132	−1	Play-ins
6	Poland	7	2 (Note: United States 17–19 Poland)	5	116	139	−23	Play-ins
7	United States	7	2	5	116	138	−22	
8	China	7	1	6	107	141	−34	

Source: FIBA
Rules for classification: 1) Wins; 2) Head-to-head record; 3) Points scored.
(H) Hosts
Notes:

30 July 2024
22:35
v

Boxscore

Serbia	22–14	United States
Pts: Branković 8		Pts: Maddox 6

Place de la Concorde, Paris
Referees: Vlad Ghizdareanu (ROU), Edmond Ho (HKG)

31 July 2024
22:35
v

Boxscore

United States	17–19	Poland
Pts: Barry, Travis 6		Pts: Bogucki 7

Place de la Concorde, Paris
Referees: Jasmina Juras (SRB), Vlad Ghizdareanu (ROU)

1 August 2024
19:05
v

Boxscore

United States	18–20	Lithuania
Pts: Barry 9		Pts: Pukelis 7

Place de la Concorde, Paris
Referees: Edmond Ho (HKG), Najib Chajiddine (FRA)

1 August 2024
23:05
v

Boxscore

United States	19–21	Latvia
Pts: Barry 10		Pts: Miezis 10

Place de la Concorde, Paris
Referees: Najib Chajiddine (FRA), Vlad Ghizdareanu (ROU)

2 August 2024
18:35
v

Boxscore

France	19–21	United States
Pts: Seguela 7		Pts: Barry 16

Place de la Concorde, Paris
Referees: Shi Qirong (CHN), Edmond Ho (HKG)

2 August 2024
22:35
v

Boxscore

China	17–21	United States
Pts: Zhao 9		Pts: Barry 14

Place de la Concorde, Paris
Referees: Kim Ga-in (KOR), Vlad Ghizdareanu (ROU)

4 August 2024
19:05
v

Boxscore

United States	6–21	Netherlands
Pts: three players 2		Pts: De Jong 11

Place de la Concorde, Paris
Referees: Edmond Ho (HKG), Jasmina Juras (SRB)

==== Women's tournament ====
The defending champions U.S. women's 3x3 team qualified for the Olympics as one of the three highest-ranked teams in the world. On February 8, 2024, USA Basketball announced that the team's coach would be Jennifer Rizzotti, president of the Connecticut Sun, and her assistant coach would be Tammi Reiss.

Head coach

- Jennifer Rizzotti

Assistant coach

- Tammi Reiss

Team roster

The roster was revealed on June 5, 2024. Dearica Hamby replaced Cameron Brink on the roster after the latter tore her ACL during a WNBA game on June 18, 2024.

- Cierra Burdick
- Dearica Hamby*
- Rhyne Howard
- Hailey Van Lith

Group play

Pos	Team	Pld	W	L	PF	PA	PD	Qualification
1	Germany	7	6	1	117	100	+17	Semifinals
2	Spain	7	4 (Note: Spain 2–1; United States 2–1; Canada 1–2; Australia 1–2. Sorted by points scored after first tie broken.)	3	115	114	+1	Semifinals
3	United States	7	4	3	108	109	−1	Play-ins
4	Canada	7	4	3	129	112	+17	Play-ins
5	Australia	7	4	3	127	122	+5	Play-ins
6	China	7	2 (Note: China 1–1; France 1–1; Azerbaijan 1–1. Sorted by points scored.)	5	107	123	−16	Play-ins
7	Azerbaijan	7	2	5	106	123	−17	
8	France (H)	7	2	5	99	105	−6	

Source: FIBA
Rules for classification: 1) Wins; 2) Head-to-head record; 3) Points scored.
(H) Hosts
Notes:

30 July 2024
17:30

Boxscore

Germany	17–13	United States
Pts: Greinacher, Reichert 5		Pts: Van Lith 6

Place de la Concorde, Paris
Referees: Markos Michaelides (SUI), Kim Ga-in (KOR)

31 July 2024
21:30

Boxscore

United States	17–20	Azerbaijan
Pts: Hamby 7		Pts: Hayes 11

Place de la Concorde, Paris
Referees: Jasmina Juras (SRB), Kim Ga-in (KOR)

1 August 2024
13:00

Boxscore

United States	15–17	Australia
Pts: Howard 8		Pts: Wilson 8

Place de la Concorde, Paris
Referees: Brigitta Csabai-Kaskötő (HUN), Jasmina Juras (SRB)

1 August 2024
21:30

Boxscore

Spain	11–17	United States
Pts: Gimeno 5		Pts: Howard, Van Lith 5

Place de la Concorde, Paris
Referees: Shi Qirong (CHN), Marek Maliszewski (POL)

2 August 2024
13:00

Boxscore

United States	14–13	France
Pts: three players 4		Pts: Guapo 5

Place de la Concorde, Paris
Referees: Brigitta Csabai-Kaskötő (HUN), Marek Maliszewski (POL)

2 August 2024
18:00

Boxscore

United States	18–17 (OT)	Canada
Pts: Howard 7		Pts: K. Plouffe 10

Place de la Concorde, Paris
Referees: Kim Ga-in (KOR), Najib Chajiddine (FRA)

3 August 2024
19:05

Boxscore

China	12–14	United States
Pts: Wan, Zhang 4		Pts: Van Lith 6

Place de la Concorde, Paris
Referees: Markos Michaelides (SUI), Vlad Ghizdareanu (ROU)

Play-in

3 August 2024
22:05

Boxscore

United States	21–13	China
Pts: Hamby 9		Pts: Chen, Wan 4

Place de la Concorde, Paris
Referees: Markos Michaelides (SUI), Kim Ga-in (KOR)

Semifinal

5 August 2024
17:30

Boxscore

Spain	18–16 (OT)	United States
Pts: Ygueravide 9		Pts: Van Lith 8

Place de la Concorde, Paris
Referees: Shi Qirong (CHN), Marek Maliszewski (POL)

Bronze medal game

5 August 2024
21:00

Boxscore

Canada	13–16	United States
Pts: K. Plouffe 5		Pts: Van Lith 6

Place de la Concorde, Paris
Referees: Najib Chajiddine (FRA), Shi Qirong (CHN)

== Boxing ==
The U.S. qualified eight boxers into the Olympic tournament. The first qualifying event was the 2023 Pan American Games in Santiago, Chile, with American boxers earning their Olympic quotas there. Later on, one American boxer qualified via the 2024 World Olympic Qualification Tournament 1 in Busto Arsizio, Italy. Roscoe Hill (men's flyweight) and Alyssa Mendoza (women's featherweight) secured their spots, having won in the quota bouts round at the 2024 World Olympic Qualification Tournament 2 in Bangkok, Thailand. American athletes would compete in eight of the 13 available weight classes. All of them are first-time Olympians for the second consecutive Games.

Men

Athlete	Event	Round of 32	Round of 16	Quarterfinals	Semifinals	Final	
Athlete	Event	Opposition Result	Opposition Result	Opposition Result	Opposition Result	Opposition Result	Rank
Roscoe Hill	Men's 51 kg	Ahmadisafa (EOR); W 5–0	Bennama (FRA); L 2–3	Did not advance			
Jahmal Harvey	Men's 57 kg	Bye	Oliveira (BRA); W 3–2	Uulu (KGZ); L 2–3	Did not advance		
Omari Jones	Men's 71 kg	Bye	Kan (TPE); W 5–0	Kiwan (BUL); W 5–0	Myudinkhujaev (UZB); L 2–3	Did not advance	3rd place, bronze medalist(s)
Joshua Edwards	Men's +92 kg	—N/a	Lenzi (ITA); L 1–3	Did not advance			

Women

Athlete	Event	Round of 32	Round of 16	Quarterfinals	Semifinals	Final	
Athlete	Event	Opposition Result	Opposition Result	Opposition Result	Opposition Result	Opposition Result	Rank
Jennifer Lozano	Women's 50 kg	Bye	Kaivo-oja (FIN); L 0–5	Did not advance			
Alyssa Mendoza	Women's 57 kg	Samadova (TJK); W 3–2	Romeu (BRA); L 1–4	Did not advance			
Jajaira Gonzalez	Women's 60 kg	Mossely (FRA); W 4–0	Ferreira (BRA); L 0–5	Did not advance			
Morelle McCane	Women's 66 kg	Bye	Khamidova (UZB); L 2–3	Did not advance			

== Breaking ==
The United States qualified four breakdancers for the Paris Olympics. Victor Montalvo (Victor) qualified for the Games in the B-Boy dual category following his victory at the 2023 World Championships in Leuven, Belgium. Sunny Choi (Sunny) qualified in the B-Girl category following her victory at the 2023 Pan American Games in Santiago, Chile. Later on, Jeffrey Louis (Jeffro) and Logan Elanna Edra (Logistx) outlasted from the 2024 Olympic Qualifier Series in Shanghai, China and Budapest, Hungary.

Athlete	Nickname	Event	Pre-qualification	Round robin				Quarterfinal	Semifinal	Final / BM	
Athlete	Nickname	Event	Opposition Result	Opposition Result	Opposition Result	Opposition Result	Rank	Opposition Result	Opposition Result	Opposition Result	Rank
Jeffrey Louis	Jeffro	B-Boys	—N/a	Lagaet (FRA); W 2–0	Lee (NED); W 2–0	Hong10 (KOR); T 1–1	1 Q	Danny Dann (FRA); L 1–2	Did not advance		
Victor Montalvo	Victor	B-Boys	—N/a	Shigekix (JPN); T 1–1	Lithe-ing (CHN); W 2–0	Hiro10 (JPN); W 2–0	1 Q	Amir (KAZ); W 3–0	Danny Dann (FRA); L 1–2	Bronze medal match Shigekix (JPN); W 3–0	3rd place, bronze medalist(s)
Sunny Choi	Sunny	B-Girls	Bye	671 (CHN); L 0–2	India (NED); L 0–2	Vanessa (POR); W 2–0	3	Did not advance			
Logan Edra	Logistx	B-Girls	Bye	Raygun (AUS); W 2–0	Nicka (LTU); L 0–2	Syssy (FRA); T 1–1	3	Did not advance			

== Canoeing ==
=== Slalom ===
The United States qualified two boats into the slalom competition via the 2023 ICF Canoe Slalom World Championships in London, Great Britain. Evy Leibfarth competed in the women's events, and Casey Eichfeld competed in the men's.

Athlete	Event	Preliminary						Semifinal		Final	
Athlete	Event	Run 1	Rank	Run 2	Rank	Best	Rank	Time	Rank	Time	Rank
Casey Eichfeld	Men's C-1	99.84	14	94.69	4	94.69	10 Q	162.23	16	Did not advance	
Evy Leibfarth	Women's C-1	108.82	9	107.09	8	107.09	11 Q	117.58	12 Q	109.95	3rd place, bronze medalist(s)
Evy Leibfarth	Women's K-1	97.24	8	93.84	4	93.84	4 Q	109.54	15	Did not advance	

Kayak cross

Athlete	Event	Time trial		Round 1	Repechage	Heat	Quarterfinal	Semifinal	Final	
Athlete	Event	Time	Rank	Position	Position	Position	Position	Position	Position	Rank
Casey Eichfeld	Men's KX-1	81.13	33	3 R	3	Did not advance				37
Evy Leibfarth	Women's KX-1	72.66	6	1 Q	Bye	1 Q	3	Did not advance		10

=== Sprint ===
U.S. canoeists qualified one boat in each of the following distances via the 2023 ICF Canoe Sprint World Championships in Duisburg, Germany, and the 2024 Pan American Canoe Sprint Olympic Qualifiers in Sarasota. On March 22, 2024, 2020 Olympic gold medalist Nevin Harrison became the first American to qualify for the Paris Games in any canoe or kayak event.

Athlete	Event	Heats		Quarterfinals		Semifinals		Final	
Athlete	Event	Time	Rank	Time	Rank	Time	Rank	Time	Rank
Jonas Ecker	Men's K-1 1000 m	3:37.21	3 QF	3:41.77	5	Did not advance			
Aaron Small	Men's K-1 1000 m	3:40.87	6 QF	3:42.05	5	Did not advance			
Jonas Ecker; Aaron Small	Men's K-2 500 m	1:32.01	5 QF	1:28.93	3 SF	1:29.51	4 FA	1:30.02	8
Nevin Harrison	Women's C-1 200 m	45.70	1 SF	Bye		45.30	2 FA	44.13	2nd place, silver medalist(s)

Qualification Legend: FA - Qualify to final (medal); FB - Qualify to final B (non-medal); SF - Qualify to semifinal; QF - Qualify to quarterfinal

== Cycling ==
=== Road ===
The United States qualified a team of six road cyclists via the UCI Nation Ranking and 2023 World Championships in Glasgow, Scotland, United Kingdom.

Men

Athlete	Event	Time	Rank
Matteo Jorgenson	Road race	6:20:50	9
Brandon McNulty	Road race	6:21:54	24
Magnus Sheffield	Road race	6:26:57	42
Brandon McNulty	Time trial	37:16.60	5
Magnus Sheffield	Time trial	38:05.24	16

Women

Athlete	Event	Time	Rank
Chloé Dygert	Road race	4:03:03	15
Kristen Faulkner	Road race	3:59:23	1st place, gold medalist(s)
Chloé Dygert	Time trial	41:10.70	3rd place, bronze medalist(s)
Taylor Knibb	Time trial	43:03.46	19

=== Track ===
The United States qualified six track athletes via the 2022–2024 UCI Track Olympic Ranking.

Pursuit

Athlete	Event	Qualification		Semifinal	Final / BM / Cl.	
Athlete	Event	Time	Rank	Opponent Results	Opponent Results	Rank
Chloé Dygert; Kristen Faulkner; Jennifer Valente; Lily Williams	Women's team pursuit	4:05.238	2 Q	Great Britain; W 4:04.629–4:04.908 FA	New Zealand; W 4:04.306–4:04.927	1st place, gold medalist(s)

Qualification legend: Q - Qualify to semifinal for gold medal; q - Qualify to classification semifinal; FA - Gold medal final; FB - Bronze medal final; FC - Fifth place final; FD - Seventh place final

Omnium

Athlete	Event	Scratch race		Tempo race			Elimination race		Points race		Total	
Athlete	Event	Rank	OP	Points	Rank	OP	Rank	OP	Points	Rank	OP	Rank
Grant Koontz	Men's omnium	15	12	21	9	24	18	6	0	6	42	16
Jennifer Valente	Women's omnium	1	40	9	2	38	1	40	26	18	144	1st place, gold medalist(s)

Madison

Athlete	Event	Points	Rank
Jennifer Valente; Lily Williams	Women's madison	18	4

=== Mountain biking ===
U.S. mountain bikers secured two men's and two women's quota places in the Olympic cross-country race by topping the field of nations vying for qualification at the 2023 Pan American Championships in Congonhas, Brazil, and based on the points acquired throughout the biennial UCI Olympic Qualification Ranking.

Athlete	Event	Time	Rank
Riley Amos	Men's cross-country	1:28:08	7
Christopher Blevins	Men's cross-country	1:29:06	13
Haley Batten	Women's cross-country	1:28:59	2nd place, silver medalist(s)
Savilia Blunk	Women's cross-country	1:31:52	12

=== BMX ===
Freestyle
The United States received four quota spots, with American athletes finishing among the top six at the 2024 Olympic Qualifier Series.

Athlete	Event	Seeding		Final	
Athlete	Event	Points	Rank	Points	Rank
Marcus Christopher	Men's	89.48	2 Q	93.11	4
Justin Dowell	Men's	89.07	4 Q	88.35	7
Perris Benegas	Women's	85.44	4 Q	90.70	2nd place, silver medalist(s)
Hannah Roberts	Women's	91.45	1 Q	70.00	8

Race
U.S. riders received five quota places (two men's and three women's) in the BMX Race for Paris 2024 by topping the field of nations vying for qualification at the 2023 Pan American Championships in Riobamba, Ecuador, and the 2024 UCI BMX World Championships, as well as through the final Olympic BMX ranking.

Athlete	Event	Quarterfinal		LCQ		Semifinal		Final	
Athlete	Event	Points	Rank	Time	Rank	Points	Rank	Result	Rank
Kamren Larsen	Men's	7	4 Q	Bye		19	14	Did not advance	
Cameron Wood	Men's	7	5 Q	Bye		11	7 Q	32.446	5
Felicia Stancil	Women's	20	22	Did not advance					
Daleny Vaughn	Women's	8	7 Q	Bye		16	11	Did not advance	
Alise Willoughby	Women's	3	3 Q	Bye		11	5 Q	36.171	6

== Diving ==
U.S. divers secured two quota places each in the men's synchronized springboard and women's synchronized platform for Paris 2024 by attaining a top-three finish from the list of nations eligible for qualification at the 2023 World Aquatics Championships in Fukuoka, Japan. Team USA then secured a further two quota places via the 2024 World Aquatics Championships in Doha, Qatar.

The entire diving team was selected during the U.S. Olympic Trials in Knoxville, Tennessee between June 17–23, 2024. Carson Tyler became the first male diver to represent the United States in both the 3m springboard and 10m platform at the same Olympics since Mark Ruiz did so at the 2000 Sydney Olympics. On June 26, Brandon Loschiavo was added to the team for the 10m platform following a reallocation of quota places.

Sarah Bacon and Kassidy Cook won silver in the 3m synchronized springboard event on July 27, 2024, becoming the first American medalists at the Games.

Men

Athlete	Event	Preliminary		Semifinal		Final	
Athlete	Event	Points	Rank	Points	Rank	Points	Rank
Andrew Capobianco	3 m springboard	382.05	15 Q	407.65	15	Did not advance	
Carson Tyler	3 m springboard	389.80	10 Q	438.00	7 Q	429.25	4
Brandon Loschiavo	10 m platform	393.65	13 Q	372.45	17	Did not advance	
Carson Tyler	10 m platform	363.75	19	Did not advance			
Tyler Downs; Greg Duncan	3 m synchronized springboard	—N/a				346.08	8

Women

Athlete	Event	Preliminary		Semifinal		Final	
Athlete	Event	Points	Rank	Points	Rank	Points	Rank
Sarah Bacon	3 m springboard	264.40	19	Did not advance			
Alison Gibson	3 m springboard	198.30	28	Did not advance			
Delaney Schnell	10 m platform	278.15	17 Q	271.95	15	Did not advance	
Daryn Wright	10 m platform	272.25	19	Did not advance			
Sarah Bacon; Kassidy Cook	3 m synchronized springboard	—N/a				314.64	2nd place, silver medalist(s)
Jessica Parratto; Delaney Schnell	10 m synchronized platform	—N/a				287.52	6

== Equestrian ==
U.S. equestrians entered a full squad each in their respective disciplines through a top-six finish in the team dressage at the 2022 World Championships in Herning, Denmark; a top-seven finish at the Eventing Worlds of the same year in Pratoni del Vivaro, Italy; and a top-three finish at the 2023 Pan American Games in Santiago, Chile.

The eventing team was announced on June 3, 2024, the dressage team was announced on June 25, 2024, and the jumping team was revealed on July 6, 2024.

=== Dressage ===
Athlete	Horse	Event	Grand Prix		Grand Prix Special		Grand Prix Freestyle		Overall	
Athlete	Horse	Event	Score	Rank	Score	Rank	Technical	Artistic	Score	Rank
Adrienne Lyle	Helix	Individual	72.593	3	—N/a		Did not advance			
Marcus Orlob	Jane	Individual	WD		—N/a		Did not advance			
Steffen Peters	Suppenkasper	Individual	66.491	9	—N/a		Did not advance			
Adrienne Lyle; Marcus Orlob; Steffen Peters	See above	Team	WD		Did not advance		—N/a			

Qualification Legend: Q = Qualified for the final based on position in group; q = Qualified for the final based on overall position

=== Eventing ===
Athlete	Horse	Event	Dressage		Cross-country			Jumping						Total	
Athlete	Horse	Event	Dressage		Cross-country			Qualifier			Final			Total	
Athlete	Horse	Event	Penalties	Rank	Penalties	Total	Rank	Penalties	Total	Rank	Penalties	Total	Rank	Penalties	Rank
Liz Halliday-Sharp	Cooley Nutcracker	Individual	28.00	19	6.00	34.00	22	0.80	34.80	15 Q	5.20	40.00	19	40.00	19
Boyd Martin	Fedarman B	Individual	30.50	26	1.60	32.10	17	0.00	32.10	11 Q	0.00	32.10	10	32.10	10
Caroline Pamukcu	HSH Blake	Individual	30.40	25	32.00	62.40	47	4.40	66.80	37	Did not advance			66.80	37
Liz Halliday-Sharp; Boyd Martin; Caroline Pamukcu	See above	Team	88.90	6	38.00	128.50	9	5.20	133.70	7	—N/a			133.70	7

=== Jumping ===
Athlete	Horse	Event	Qualification			Final			Jump-off		
Athlete	Horse	Event	Penalties	Time	Rank	Penalties	Time	Rank	Penalties	Time	Rank
Karl Cook	Caracole de la Roque	Individual	0	76.97	16 Q	8	79.72	16	Did not advance		
Laura Kraut	Baloutinue	Individual	4	73.22	27 Q	4	81.61	8	Did not advance		
McLain Ward	Ilex	Individual	4	75.50	34	Did not advance					
Karl Cook; Laura Kraut; McLain Ward	See above	Team	6	227.57	2 Q	4	229.90	2nd place, silver medalist(s)	—N/a		

== Fencing ==
U.S. fencers qualified a full squad each in the men's and women's team foil and women's team épée for the Games at the Fencing World Cup. The women's saber and men's saber squads qualified for the Olympics via the World Cup, Zonal Championships, and World Championships, and the full roster of 20 fencers (including five alternate athletes) was announced on May 1, 2024, with women outnumbering men. Among the qualified competitors were Lee Kiefer, Alexander Massialas, Nick Itkin, Colin Heathcock, Eli Dershwitz, Gerek Meinhardt, Elizabeth Tartakovsky, Tatiana Nazlymov, Magda Skarbonkiewicz, Lauren Scruggs, Jackie Dubrovich, Anne Cebula, Hadley Husisian, Margherita Guzzi Vincenti, and Mitchell Saron.

Men

Athlete	Event	Round of 64	Round of 32	Round of 16	Quarterfinal	Semifinal	Final / BM	
Athlete	Event	Opposition Score	Opposition Score	Opposition Score	Opposition Score	Opposition Score	Opposition Score	Rank
Nick Itkin	Foil	Bye	Tofalides (CYP); W 15–10	Tolba (EGY); W 15–8	Bianchi (ITA); W 15–14	Macchi (ITA); L 11–15	Bronze medal final Iimura (JPN); W 15–12	3rd place, bronze medalist(s)
Alexander Massialas	Foil	Bye	Keryhuel (CIV); W 15–3	Iimura (JPN); L 8–15	Did not advance			
Gerek Meinhardt	Foil	Bye	Chen (CHN); W 15–7	Lefort (FRA); L 10–15	Did not advance			
Miles Chamley-Watson; Nick Itkin; Alexander Massialas; Gerek Meinhardt	Team foil	—N/a			Egypt; W 45–35	Italy; L 38–45	Bronze medal final France; L 32–45	4
Eli Dershwitz	Sabre	Bye	Gémesi (HUN); L 10–15	Did not advance				
Colin Heathcock	Sabre	Bye	Park (KOR); L 10–15	Did not advance				
Mitchell Saron	Sabre	Bye	Pianfetti (FRA); W 15–12	El-Sissy (EGY); L 13–15	Did not advance			
Eli Dershwitz; Filip Dolegiewicz; Colin Heathcock; Mitchell Saron	Team sabre	—N/a			Iran; L 44–45	Classification semifinal Italy; L 40–45	Seventh place final Canada; W 45–43	7

Women

Athlete	Event	Round of 64	Round of 32	Round of 16	Quarterfinal	Semifinal	Final / BM	
Athlete	Event	Opposition Score	Opposition Score	Opposition Score	Opposition Score	Opposition Score	Opposition Score	Rank
Anne Cebula	Épée	Bye	Fiamingo (ITA); W 15–14	Mallo (FRA); L 13–15	Did not advance			
Hadley Husisian	Épée	Bye	Brunner (SUI); W 12–11	Kong (HKG); L 12–15	Did not advance			
Margherita Guzzi Vincenti	Épée	Bye	Kharkova (UKR); L 6–15	Did not advance				
Anne Cebula; Katharine Holmes; Hadley Husisian; Margherita Guzzi Vincenti	Team épée	—N/a			Poland; L 29–31	Classification semifinal South Korea; L 39–45	Seventh place final Egypt; W 44–30	7
Jacqueline Dubrovich	Foil	Bye	Pásztor (HUN); L 12–15	Did not advance				
Lee Kiefer	Foil	Bye	Jelińska (POL); W 15–13	Huang (CHN); W 15–9	Pásztor (HUN); W 15–4	Volpi (ITA); W 15–10	Scruggs (USA); W 15–6	1st place, gold medalist(s)
Lauren Scruggs	Foil	Bye	Berthier (SGP); W 15–13	Guo (CAN); W 15–11	Errigo (ITA); W 15–14	Harvey (CAN); W 15–9	Kiefer (USA); L 6–15	2nd place, silver medalist(s)
Jacqueline Dubrovich; Lee Kiefer; Lauren Scruggs; Maia Weintraub	Team foil	—N/a			China; W 45–37	Canada; W 45–31	Italy; W 45–39	1st place, gold medalist(s)
Tatiana Nazlymov	Sabre	Bye	Choi (KOR); L 14–15	Did not advance				
Magda Skarbonkiewicz	Sabre	Bye	Erbil (TUR); L 11–15	Did not advance				
Elizabeth Tartakovsky	Sabre	Bye	Hafez (EGY); L 13–15	Did not advance				
Maia Chamberlain; Tatiana Nazlymov; Magda Skarbonkiewicz; Elizabeth Tartakovsky	Team sabre	—N/a			South Korea; L 35–45	Classification semifinal Algeria; W 45–28	Fifth place final Hungary; W 45–39	5

== Field hockey ==
Summary

Key:

- FT – After full-time.
- P – Match decided by penalty-shootout.

Team	Event	Group stage						Quarterfinal	Semifinal	Final / BM	
Team	Event	Opposition Score	Opposition Score	Opposition Score	Opposition Score	Opposition Score	Rank	Opposition Score	Opposition Score	Opposition Score	Rank
United States women	Women's tournament	Argentina; L 1–4	Spain; D 1–1	Australia; L 0–3	Great Britain; L 2–5	South Africa; W 1–0	5	Did not advance			9

=== Women's tournament ===
The United States women's national field hockey team qualified for the Olympics after securing a top-three finish at the 2024 FIH Olympic Qualifiers.

Team roster The squad was announced on 12 June 2024.

Head coach: (Republic of Ireland) David Passmore

No.	Pos.	Player	Date of birth (age)	Caps	Goals	Club
1	FW	Abigail Tamer	9 July 2003 (aged 21)	31	10	(United States) Pinnacle
2	MF	Meredith Sholder	27 February 1999 (aged 25)	49	2	(United States) Firestyx
3	FW	Ashley Sessa	23 June 2004 (aged 20)	50	13	(United States) WC Eagles
6	FW	Megan Valzonis	5 March 1999 (aged 25)	35	4	(United States) RUSH Field Hockey
8	MF	Brooke DeBerdine	19 May 1999 (aged 25)	50	1	(United States) Nook Hockey
9	DF	Madeleine Zimmer	28 September 2001 (aged 22)	53	2	(United States) Alley Cats
12	MF	Amanda Golini (Captain)	28 March 1995 (aged 29)	154	14	(United States) Rapid Fire Elite
13	DF	Ashley Hoffman (Captain)	8 November 1996 (aged 27)	123	26	(United States) X–Calibur
17	FW	Elizabeth Yeager	17 June 2003 (aged 21)	53	11	(United States) WC Eagles
20	DF	Leah Crouse	22 February 2000 (aged 24)	48	3	(United States) TCOYO
21	DF	Alexandra Hammel	16 June 1996 (aged 28)	69	1	(United States) HTC Field Hockey
23	FW	Sophia Gladieux	14 June 2002 (aged 22)	5	1	(United States) X–Calibur
24	DF	Kelee Lepage	4 October 1997 (aged 26)	42	0	(United States) X–Calibur
25	MF	Karlie Kisha	25 September 1995 (aged 28)	68	1	(United States) Highstyx
27	MF	Emma DeBerdine	14 June 2001 (aged 23)	44	0	(United States) Nook Hockey
31	GK	Kelsey Bing	14 June 2001 (aged 23)	86	0	(United States) Texas Pride

Group play

Pos	Team	Pld	W	D	L	GF	GA	GD	Pts	Qualification
1	Australia	5	4	1	0	15	5	+10	13	Quarter-finals
2	Argentina	5	4	1	0	16	7	+9	13	Quarter-finals
3	Spain	5	2	1	2	6	7	−1	7	Quarter-finals
4	Great Britain	5	2	0	3	8	12	−4	6	Quarter-finals
5	United States	5	1	1	3	5	13	−8	4	
6	South Africa	5	0	0	5	4	10	−6	0	

Source: FIH
Rules for classification: 1) points; 2) matches won; 3) goal difference; 4) goals for; 5) head-to-head result; 6) field goals scored.

27 July 2024
19:45
v

Argentina	4–1	United States
Sánchez Moccia 18'; Gorzelany 29'; Jankunas 44'; Díaz 47'	Report	Sessa 33'

Pitch 1
Umpires:
Aleisha Neumann (AUS)
Wanri Venter (RSA)

29 July 2024
13:15
v

Spain	1–1	United States
García 20'	Report	Gladieux 14'

Pitch 2
Umpires:
Cookie Tan (SGP)
Rachel Williams (GBR)

31 July 2024
13:15
v

Australia	3–0	United States
Taylor 3'; Arnott 29'; Brooks 53'	Report

Pitch 2
Umpires:
Liu Xiaoying (CHN)
Rachel Williams (GBR)

1 August 2024
17:00
v

United States	2–5	Great Britain
Tamer 7', 29'	Report	Hamilton 4'; Howard 14', 25'; French 35'; Jones 39'

Pitch 1
Umpires:
Steve Rodgers (AUS)
Ayanna McClean (TTO)

3 August 2024
13:15
v

United States	1–0	South Africa
Sholder 43'	Report

Pitch 2
Umpires:
Hannah Harrison (GBR)
Cookie Tan (SGP)

== Football (soccer) ==
Summary

Key:

- A.E.T – After extra time.
- P – Match decided by penalty-shootout.

Team	Event	Group Stage				Quarterfinal	Semifinal	Final / BM	
Team	Event	Opposition Score	Opposition Score	Opposition Score	Rank	Opposition Score	Opposition Score	Opposition Score	Rank
United States men	Men's tournament	France; L 0–3	New Zealand; W 4–1	Guinea; W 3–0	2 Q	Morocco; L 0–4	Did not advance		8
United States women	Women's tournament	Zambia; W 3–0	Germany; W 4–1	Australia; W 2–1	1 Q	Japan; W 1–0 a.e.t.	Germany; W 1–0 a.e.t.	Brazil; W 1–0	1st place, gold medalist(s)

=== Men's tournament ===
For the first time since 2008, the United States men's soccer team qualified for the Olympics by advancing to the final match at the 2022 CONCACAF U-20 Championship in Honduras.

Team roster

The United States announced their final squad on 8 July 2024.

Head coach: (Serbia) Marko Mitrović

No.	Pos.	Player	Date of birth (age)	Caps	Goals	Club
1	GK	Patrick Schulte	13 March 2001 (aged 23)	3	0	(United States Soccer Federation) Columbus Crew
2	DF	Nathan Harriel	23 April 2001 (aged 23)	7	1	(United States Soccer Federation) Philadelphia Union
3	DF	Walker Zimmerman*	19 May 1993 (aged 31)	4	0	(United States Soccer Federation) Nashville SC
4	DF	Maximilian Dietz	9 February 2002 (aged 22)	6	0	(German Football Association) Greuther Fürth
5	DF	John Tolkin	31 July 2002 (aged 21)	7	0	(United States Soccer Federation) New York Red Bulls
6	MF	Gianluca Busio	28 May 2002 (aged 22)	6	1	(Italian Football Federation) Venezia
7	FW	Kevin Paredes	7 May 2003 (aged 21)	2	0	(German Football Association) VfL Wolfsburg
8	MF	Tanner Tessmann (captain)	24 September 2001 (aged 22)	10	0	(Italian Football Federation) Venezia
9	FW	Griffin Yow	25 September 2002 (aged 21)	3	1	(Royal Belgian Football Association) Westerlo
10	FW	Taylor Booth	31 May 2001 (aged 23)	4	0	(Royal Dutch Football Association) Utrecht
11	FW	Paxten Aaronson	26 August 2003 (aged 20)	5	1	(Royal Dutch Football Association) Vitesse
12	DF	Miles Robinson*	14 March 1997 (aged 27)	3	1	(United States Soccer Federation) FC Cincinnati
13	FW	Duncan McGuire	5 February 2001 (aged 23)	5	1	(United States Soccer Federation) Orlando City
14	MF	Djordje Mihailovic*	10 November 1998 (aged 25)	9	1	(United States Soccer Federation) Colorado Rapids
15	MF	Benjamin Cremaschi	2 March 2005 (aged 19)	5	1	(United States Soccer Federation) Inter Miami
16	MF	Jack McGlynn	7 July 2003 (aged 21)	7	0	(United States Soccer Federation) Philadelphia Union
17	DF	Caleb Wiley	22 December 2004 (aged 19)	5	0	(United States Soccer Federation) Atlanta United
18	GK	Gabriel Slonina	15 April 2004 (aged 20)	0	0	(Royal Belgian Football Association) Eupen
21	MF	Josh Atencio	31 January 2002 (aged 22)	0	0	(United States Soccer Federation) Seattle Sounders

* Overage player.

Group play

Pos	Team	Pld	W	D	L	GF	GA	GD	Pts	Qualification
1	France (H)	3	3	0	0	7	0	+7	9	Advance to knockout stage
2	United States	3	2	0	1	7	4	+3	6	Advance to knockout stage
3	New Zealand	3	1	0	2	3	8	−5	3	
4	Guinea	3	0	0	3	1	6	−5	0	

Source: FIFA
Rules for classification: Group stage tiebreakers
(H) Hosts
24 July 2024
21:00

France	3–0	United States
Lacazette 61'; Olise 69'; Badé 85'	Report

Stade de Marseille, Marseille
Attendance: 48,721
Referee: Yael Falcón (Argentina)

27 July 2024
19:00

New Zealand	1–4	United States
Randall 78'	Report	Mihailovic 8' (pen.); Zimmerman 12'; Busio 30'; Aaronson 58'

Stade de Marseille, Marseille
Attendance: 9,468
Referee: Glenn Nyberg (Sweden)

30 July 2024
19:00

United States	3–0	Guinea
Mihailovic 14'; Paredes 31', 75'	Report

Stade Geoffroy-Guichard, Saint-Étienne
Attendance: 6,245
Referee: Tess Olofsson (Sweden)

Quarterfinal

2 August 2024
15:00

Morocco	4–0	United States
Rahimi 29' (pen.); Akhomach 63'; Hakimi 70'; Maouhoub 90+1' (pen.)	Report

Parc des Princes, Paris
Attendance: 42,868
Referee: Yael Falcón (Argentina)

=== Women's tournament ===
The United States women's soccer team qualified for the Olympics by winning the final match against the defending champions Canada at the 2022 CONCACAF W Championship in Mexico.

Team roster
The United States named a squad of 18 players and 4 alternates for the tournament on 26 June 2024. This their first major tournament since the 2008 Summer Olympics to not feature Alex Morgan.

The numbers were announced on 3 July. On 12 July, Catarina Macario withdrew from the squad due to injury and was replaced by Lynn Williams. Emily Sams was added to the alternate list.

Head coach: (United Kingdom) Emma Hayes

No.	Pos.	Player	Date of birth (age)	Caps	Goals	Club
1	GK	Alyssa Naeher	20 April 1988 (aged 36)	106	0	(United States Soccer Federation) Chicago Red Stars
2	DF	Emily Fox	5 July 1998 (aged 26)	51	1	(The Football Association) Arsenal
3	MF	Korbin Albert	13 October 2003 (aged 20)	13	0	(French Football Federation) Paris Saint-Germain
4	DF	Naomi Girma	14 June 2000 (aged 24)	34	0	(United States Soccer Federation) San Diego Wave
5	FW	Trinity Rodman	20 May 2002 (aged 22)	40	7	(United States Soccer Federation) Washington Spirit
6	DF	Casey Krueger	23 August 1990 (aged 33)	50	0	(United States Soccer Federation) Washington Spirit
7	FW	Crystal Dunn	3 July 1992 (aged 32)	149	25	(United States Soccer Federation) Gotham FC
8	FW	Lynn Williams	21 May 1993 (aged 31)	65	18	(United States Soccer Federation) Gotham FC
9	FW	Mallory Swanson	29 April 1998 (aged 26)	94	34	(United States Soccer Federation) Chicago Red Stars
10	MF	Lindsey Horan	26 May 1994 (aged 30)	150	35	(French Football Federation) Lyon
11	FW	Sophia Smith	10 August 2000 (aged 23)	50	20	(United States Soccer Federation) Portland Thorns
12	DF	Tierna Davidson	19 September 1998 (aged 25)	60	3	(United States Soccer Federation) Gotham FC
13	DF	Jenna Nighswonger	28 November 2000 (aged 23)	10	2	(United States Soccer Federation) Gotham FC
14	MF	Emily Sonnett	25 November 1993 (aged 30)	93	2	(United States Soccer Federation) Gotham FC
15	FW	Jaedyn Shaw	20 November 2004 (aged 19)	16	7	(United States Soccer Federation) San Diego Wave
16	MF	Rose Lavelle	14 May 1995 (aged 29)	101	24	(United States Soccer Federation) Gotham FC
17	MF	Sam Coffey	31 December 1998 (aged 25)	19	1	(United States Soccer Federation) Portland Thorns
18	GK	Casey Murphy	25 April 1996 (aged 28)	19	0	(United States Soccer Federation) North Carolina Courage
20	MF	Croix Bethune	14 March 2001 (aged 23)	2	0	(United States Soccer Federation) Washington Spirit
21	DF	Emily Sams	1 July 1999 (aged 25)	0	0	(United States Soccer Federation) Orlando Pride

Group play

Pos	Team	Pld	W	D	L	GF	GA	GD	Pts	Qualification
1	United States	3	3	0	0	9	2	+7	9	Advance to knockout stage
2	Germany	3	2	0	1	8	5	+3	6	Advance to knockout stage
3	Australia	3	1	0	2	7	10	−3	3	
4	Zambia	3	0	0	3	6	13	−7	0	

Source: FIFA
Rules for classification: Group stage tiebreakers
25 July 2024
21:00

United States	3–0	Zambia
Rodman 17'; Swanson 24', 25'	Report

Stade de Nice, Nice
Attendance: 5,550
Referee: Ramon Abatti (Brazil)

28 July 2024
21:00

United States	4–1	Germany
Smith 11', 44'; Swanson 26'; Williams 89'	Report	Gwinn 22'

Stade de Marseille, Marseille
Attendance: 12,845
Referee: Yael Falcón (Argentina)

31 July 2024
19:00

Australia	1–2	United States
Kennedy 90+2'	Report	Rodman 43'; Albert 77'

Stade de Marseille, Marseille
Attendance: 13,036
Referee: François Letexier (France)

Quarterfinal

3 August 2024
15:00

United States	1–0 (a.e.t.)	Japan
Rodman 105+2'	Report

Parc des Princes, Paris
Attendance: 43,004
Referee: Tess Olofsson (Sweden)

Semifinal

6 August 2024
18:00

United States	1–0 (a.e.t.)	Germany
Smith 95'	Report

Stade de Lyon, Décines-Charpieu
Attendance: 11,716
Referee: Bouchra Karboubi (Morocco)

Gold medal match

10 August 2024
17:00

Brazil	0–1	United States
	Report	Swanson 57'

Parc des Princes, Paris
Attendance: 43,813
Referee: Tess Olofsson (Sweden)

== Golf ==
The United States qualified seven golfers into the Olympic tournament. All of them secured their spots for the games in the individual competitions based on their performance in the IGF World Rankings.

Men

Athlete	Event	Round 1	Round 2	Round 3	Round 4	Total		
Athlete	Event	Score	Score	Score	Score	Score	Par	Rank
Wyndham Clark	Men's	75	68	65	65	273	−11	=14
Collin Morikawa	Men's	70	68	70	70	278	−6	=24
Xander Schauffele	Men's	65	66	68	73	272	−12	=9
Scottie Scheffler	Men's	67	69	67	62	265	−19	1st place, gold medalist(s)

Women

Athlete	Event	Round 1	Round 2	Round 3	Round 4	Total		
Athlete	Event	Score	Score	Score	Score	Score	Par	Rank
Nelly Korda	Women's	72	70	70	75	287	−1	=22
Lilia Vu	Women's	70	73	76	74	293	+5	=36
Rose Zhang	Women's	72	70	67	74	283	–5	=8

== Gymnastics ==
=== Artistic ===
The United States entered a full squad in artistic gymnastics. Five female gymnasts qualified for Paris after achieving a gold-medal victory in the team all-around at the 2022 World Championships in Liverpool, England. Meanwhile, five male gymnasts qualified for Paris by virtue of a top-nine finish in the team all-around at the 2023 World Artistic Gymnastics Championships in Antwerp, Belgium.

The men's team was named on June 29, 2024, and included Fred Richard, Brody Malone, Paul Juda, Asher Hong, and Stephen Nedoroscik. Shane Wiskus, a 2020 Olympian, and Khoi Young were named as traveling alternates for the men's team.

The women's team was named on June 30, 2024. The top all-around finisher, Olympic and world champion Simone Biles, was named to her third Olympic team as the winner of the Olympic Trials in the all-around. Sunisa Lee, Jordan Chiles, and Jade Carey who finished second, third, and fourth place, were named to their second Olympic team by the selection committee. 16-year-old Hezly Rivera was the fifth person named to the team by the selection committee after placing fifth in the all-around; she became the youngest athlete on the entire 2024 U.S. Olympic delegation. Joscelyn Roberson and Leanne Wong were named as traveling alternates for the women's team.

Men
Team

Athlete	Event	Qualification								Final							
Athlete	Event	Apparatus						Total	Rank	Apparatus						Total	Rank
Athlete	Event	F	PH	R	V	PB	HB	Total	Rank	F	PH	R	V	PB	HB	Total	Rank
Asher Hong	Team	14.100	—N/a	14.633	14.700	14.300	12.600	—N/a		14.133	—N/a	14.533	14.833	14.400	—N/a	—N/a	
Paul Juda	Team	13.966	13.600	~~13.400~~	14.533	~~14.033~~	13.333	82.865	13 Q	14.200	13.900	—N/a	14.666	—N/a	13.366	—N/a	
Brody Malone	Team	~~12.666~~	~~12.100~~	14.233	~~13.833~~	14.533	~~12.233~~	79.598	30	—N/a	13.700	14.166	14.533	14.433	14.166	—N/a	
Stephen Nedoroscik	Team	—N/a	15.200 Q	—N/a						—N/a	14.866	—N/a				—N/a	
Fred Richard	Team	13.833	13.633	13.500	13.933	14.433	14.166	83.498	10 Q	14.466	—N/a	14.033	—N/a	14.566	14.833	—N/a	
Total	Team	41.899	42.433	42.366	43.166	43.266	40.099	253.229	5 Q	42.799	42.466	42.732	44.032	43.399	42.365	257.793	3rd place, bronze medalist(s)

Individual finals

Athlete	Event	Qualification								Final							
Athlete	Event	Apparatus						Total	Rank	Apparatus						Total	Rank
Athlete	Event	F	PH	R	V	PB	HB	Total	Rank	F	PH	R	V	PB	HB	Total	Rank
Paul Juda	All-around	See team results above								13.533	13.866	13.433	13.733	13.866	13.766	82.197	14
Fred Richard	All-around	See team results above								13.200	12.733	13.600	14.100	14.133	14.400	82.166	15
Stephen Nedoroscik	Pommel horse	—N/a	15.200	—N/a				15.200	2 Q	—N/a	15.300	—N/a				15.300	3rd place, bronze medalist(s)

Women
Team

Athlete	Event	Qualification						Final					
Athlete	Event	Apparatus				Total	Rank	Apparatus				Total	Rank
Athlete	Event	V	UB	BB	F	Total	Rank	V	UB	BB	F	Total	Rank
Simone Biles	Team	15.800 Q	14.433	14.733 Q	14.600 Q	59.566	1 Q	14.900	14.400	14.366	14.666	—N/a	
Jade Carey	Team	14.666 Q	—N/a		~~10.633~~	—N/a		14.800	—N/a			—N/a	
Jordan Chiles	Team	14.333	14.266	13.600	13.866 Q	56.065	4	14.400	14.366	12.733	13.966	—N/a	
Sunisa Lee	Team	~~14.133~~	14.866 Q	14.033 Q	13.100	56.132	3 Q	—N/a	14.566	14.600	13.533	—N/a	
Hezly Rivera	Team	—N/a	~~13.900~~	~~12.633~~	—N/a			—N/a	—N/a			—N/a	
Total	Team	44.799	43.565	42.366	41.566	172.296	1 Q	44.100	43.332	41.699	42.165	171.296	1st place, gold medalist(s)

Individual finals

Athlete	Event	Qualification						Final					
Athlete	Event	Apparatus				Total	Rank	Apparatus				Total	Rank
Athlete	Event	V	UB	BB	F	Total	Rank	V	UB	BB	F	Total	Rank
Simone Biles	All-around	See team results above						15.766	13.733	14.566	15.066	59.131	1st place, gold medalist(s)
Sunisa Lee	All-around	See team results above						13.933	14.866	14.000	13.666	56.465	3rd place, bronze medalist(s)
Simone Biles	Vault	15.300	—N/a			15.300	1 Q	15.300	—N/a			15.300	1st place, gold medalist(s)
Jade Carey	Vault	14.433	—N/a			14.433	3 Q	14.466	—N/a			14.466	3rd place, bronze medalist(s)
Sunisa Lee	Uneven bars	—N/a	14.866	—N/a		14.866	3 Q	—N/a	14.800	—N/a		14.800	3rd place, bronze medalist(s)
Simone Biles	Balance beam	—N/a		14.733	—N/a	14.733	2 Q	—N/a		13.100	—N/a	13.100	5
Sunisa Lee	Balance beam	—N/a		14.033	—N/a	14.033	4 Q	—N/a		13.100	—N/a	13.100	6
Simone Biles	Floor	—N/a			14.600	14.600	1 Q	—N/a			14.133	14.133	2nd place, silver medalist(s)
Jordan Chiles	Floor	—N/a			13.866	13.866	3 Q	—N/a			13.666	13.666	5 (Note: Chiles was the last competitor to perform in the final, initially receiving a score of 13.666, which put her in fifth place directly behind Romanian gymnasts Ana Bărbosu and Sabrina Voinea who each received a score of 13.700 with Bărbosu winning the execution-score tie-breaker. Chiles's coach, Cécile Canqueteau-Landi, filed an inquiry on Chiles's score which resulted in a review that increased her difficulty score by a tenth (0.1) – it was adjusted to 5.9 from 5.8. Therefore the overall score was upgraded to 13.766, moving her from fifth into a bronze medal position. Further controversy arose when it was revealed that Voinea had received a 0.1 point deduction for going out of bounds. The replay showed that Voinea may not have gone out of bounds. If the deduction was not taken, Voinea would have scored 13.800, which would have put her in the bronze medal position even after Chiles's score was increased. Former Romanian Olympic gymnast, Nadia Comăneci, and Mihai Covaliu, president of the Romanian Olympic and Sports Committee, requested that Morinari Watanabe, the president of the International Gymnastics Federation (FIG), allow for Voinea's floor exercise to be re-analyzed. The Prime Minister of Romania, Marcel Ciolacu, stated that he would boycott the closing ceremony due to "the scandalous situation in the gymnastics, where [Romanian] athletes were treated in an absolutely dishonorable manner". Subsequently, Bărbosu and Voinea both appealed to the Court of Arbitration for Sport (CAS). Bărbosu appealed that Chiles's inquiry was filed twenty-four seconds after the one-minute deadline, and therefore should not have been reviewed in the first place. On August 10, five days after the final, the CAS found that Chiles' inquiry was filed beyond the 1-minute deadline specified in art. 8.5 of FIG 2024 Technical Regulations, with the official Omega system time clocking the inquiry at 1 minute and 4 seconds. The CAS therefore ruled that the "initial score of 13.666 given to Ms Jordan Chiles in the final of the women's floor exercise shall be reinstated" and ordered the FIG to determine the ranking of the final and "assign the medal(s) in accordance with the above decision." Voinea's appeal was simultaneously rejected. The FIG reinstated the original standings, which led to Bărbosu placing third, Voinea placing fourth, and Chiles placing fifth. On 11 August 2024, the International Olympic Committee formally confirmed the new rankings and ordered that Chiles return the bronze medal and it be reallocated to Bărbosu. Later that day, USA Gymnastics (USAG) submitted additional video evidence suggesting that the inquiry was made at 47 seconds as opposed to the official time of 1 minute and 4 seconds and requested reinstatement of the 13.766 score. The CAS denied USAG's appeal to reopen the case. USAG stated its intent to continue pursuing "every possible avenue and appeal process, including to the Swiss Federal Tribunal". The Romanian Federation eventually proposed that there could be three bronze medals awarded one each to Bărbosu, Voinea and Chiles, given the complicated nature of the situation, but the proposal never went ahead. On 16 August 2024, Bărbosu was officially awarded the Olympic bronze medal in her hometown of Focșani. On 16 September 2024, it was confirmed Chiles had filed an appeal in the Federal Supreme Court of Switzerland. The appeal was filed on two separate grounds, with the first being that the panel's chair is claimed to have had a conflict of interest with regards to representing Romania in International Centre for Settlement of Investment Disputes cases in a claimed violation of art. 190.2.a of the Swiss Private International Law Act and the second being that CAS is accused to have violated art. 190.2.d. of the Swiss Private International Law Act by not ensuring the right to be heard due to claims that CAS failed to properly contact the United States Olympic & Paralympic Committee until 15 hours prior to the hearing, that the CAS decision was not final until 14 August when its written decision was officially published, and that the panel supposedly did not follow procedure by failing to independently attempt to obtain the video footage that USAG obtained on 11 August. On 29 January 2026, the Swiss Federal Supreme Court ruled that the case should be re-examined by the CAS, taking the new visual-audio evidence presented by USA Gymnastics into account. The Federal Supreme Court, however, rejected Chiles' appeal concerning the alleged lack of independence and impartiality of the arbitrator on the original CAS case. Additionally they rejected Voinea's appeal. In February, it was reported that Bărbosu had missed three unannounced doping control tests. On 28 April, the president of the Romanian Gymnastics Federation announced she was suspended for two years due to a doping control whereabouts violation; later that day, it was clarified that she was not yet suspended, only accused of the whereabouts violation. She was provisionally suspended by the International Testing Agency on 7 May, and she requested that the case be taken to CAS.)

=== Rhythmic ===
The U.S. has secured the quota in the women's individual event by virtue of the nation's results at the 2023 Pan American Games in Santiago, Chile.

Athlete	Event	Qualification						Final					
Athlete	Event	Hoop	Ball	Clubs	Ribbon	Total	Rank	Hoop	Ball	Clubs	Ribbon	Total	Rank
Evita Griskenas	Individual	30.500	31.200	27.550	29.250	118.500	18	Did not advance					

=== Trampoline ===
The United States has qualified two gymnasts, one for the women's trampoline competition by finishing in the top eight at the 2023 World Championships in Birmingham, England, and one for the men's competition via the final ranking of the 2023–24 World Cup Series. Trampoline athletes were named at the 2024 U.S. Olympic Trials.

Athlete	Event	Qualification		Final	
Athlete	Event	Score	Rank	Score	Rank
Aliaksei Shostak	Men's	57.350	10	Did not advance	
Jessica Stevens	Women's	53.170	13	Did not advance	

== Judo ==
The United States has qualified four judokas via the IJF World Ranking List and continental quotas in the Americas.

Athlete	Event	Round of 32	Round of 16	Quarterfinals	Semifinals	Repechage	Final / BM	
Athlete	Event	Opposition Result	Opposition Result	Opposition Result	Opposition Result	Opposition Result	Opposition Result	Rank
Jack Yonezuka	Men's −73 kg	Osmanov (MDA); L 00–10	Did not advance					
John Jayne	Men's −90 kg	Parlati (ITA); W 10–00	Han (KOR); L 00–01	Did not advance				
Maria Laborde	Women's −48 kg	Guo (CHN); W 10–00	Scutto (ITA); L 00–10	Did not advance				
Angelica Delgado	Women's −52 kg	Mammadaliyeva (AZE); W 01–00	Giuffrida (ITA); L 00–01	Did not advance				

== Modern pentathlon ==
American modern pentathletes have qualified a single quota place for Paris 2024. Jessica Davis secured one of two available spots for North, Central and Caribbean Americas in the women's event at the 2023 Pan American Games in Santiago, Chile.

Athlete	Event	Fencing ranking round (épée one touch)			Semifinal													Final												
Athlete	Event	Fencing ranking round (épée one touch)			Fencing	Swimming (200 m freestyle)			Riding (show jumping)				Shooting / Running (10 m laser pistol / 3000 m cross-country)			Total points	Final rank	Fencing	Swimming			Riding				Shooting / Running			Total points	Final rank
Athlete	Event	V–D	Rank	MP points	BR	Time	Rank	MP points	Time	Penalties	Rank	MP points	Time	Rank	MP points	Total points	Final rank	BR	Time	Rank	MP points	Time	Penalties	Rank	MP points	Time	Rank	MP points	Total points	Final rank
Jessica Savner	Women's	16–19	21	209	4	2:27.61	18	255	54.99	7	9	293	12:27.42	15	553	1310	14	Did not advance												

== Rowing ==
U.S. rowers have qualified boats in each of the following classes through the 2023 World Rowing Championships in Belgrade, Serbia, and the 2024 Final Qualification Regatta in Lucerne, Switzerland. Five rowers earned their spots at the 2024 U.S. Olympic Trials on April 4–7, 2024, in Sarasota, Florida. In total, Team USA will have 12 boats, 42 athletes racing in the Olympic Games. The full roster was announced on June 10, 2024.

Men

Athlete	Event	Heats		Repechage		Quarterfinal		Semifinal		Final	
Athlete	Event	Time	Rank	Time	Rank	Time	Rank	Time	Rank	Time	Rank
James Plihal	Single sculls	6:54.95	2 QF	Bye		6:47.03	3 SC/D	6:56.95	1 FC	6:41.97	13
William Bender; Oliver Bub	Pair	7:02.62	5 R	6:51.32	3 SA/B	—N/a		6:46.11	6 FB	6:28.57	10
Benjamin Davison; Sorin Koszyk	Double sculls	6:16.48	3 SA/B	Bye		—N/a		6:14.19	2 FA	6:17.02	4
Justin Best; Liam Corrigan; Michael Grady; Nick Mead	Four	6:04.95	1 FA	Bye		—N/a				5:49.03	1st place, gold medalist(s)
Christopher Carlson; Peter Chatain; Clark Dean; Henry Hollingsworth; Rielly Milne (c); Evan Olson; Pieter Quinton; Nicholas Rusher; Christian Tabash	Eight	5:29.94	1 FA	Bye		—N/a				5:25.28	3rd place, bronze medalist(s)

Women

Athlete	Event	Heats		Repechage		Quarterfinal		Semifinal		Final	
Athlete	Event	Time	Rank	Time	Rank	Time	Rank	Time	Rank	Time	Rank
Kara Kohler	Single sculls	7:32.46	1 QF	Bye		7:34.96	2 SA/B	7:22.33	3 FA	7:25.07	5
Azja Czajkowski; Jessica Thoennes	Pair	7:25.52	3 SA/B	Bye		—N/a		7:15.59	2 FA	7:05.31	4
Sophia Vitas; Kristi Wagner	Double sculls	6:56.47	3 SA/B	Bye		—N/a		7:04.12	5 FB	6:50.74	9
Molly Reckford; Michelle Sechser	Lightweight double sculls	7:12.65	2 SA/B	Bye		—N/a		7:05.03	3 FA	6:55.60	6
Emily Kallfelz; Kaitlin Knifton; Mary Mazzio-Manson; Kelsey Reelick	Four	6:49.66	4 R	6:32.48	1 FA	—N/a				6:34.88	5
Teal Cohen; Emily Delleman; Grace Joyce; Lauren O'Connor	Quadruple sculls	6:27.35	4 R	6:34.04	5 FB	—N/a				6:31.71	9
Molly Bruggeman; Charlotte Buck; Cristina Castagna (c); Olivia Coffey; Claire Collins; Margaret Hedeman; Meghan Musnicki; Regina Salmons; Madeleine Wanamaker	Eight	6:19.00	2 R	6:03.93	1 FA	—N/a				6:01.73	5

Qualification Legend: FA=Final A (medal); FB=Final B (non-medal); FC=Final C (non-medal); FD=Final D (non-medal); FE=Final E (non-medal); FF=Final F (non-medal); SA/B=Semifinals A/B; SC/D=Semifinals C/D; SE/F=Semifinals E/F; QF=Quarterfinals; R=Repechage

== Rugby sevens ==
Summary

Team	Event	Pool round				Quarterfinal	Semifinal / Cl.	Final / BM / Cl.	
Team	Event	Opposition Result	Opposition Result	Opposition Result	Rank	Opposition Result	Opposition Result	Opposition Result	Rank
United States men	Men's tournament	France; D 12–12	Fiji; L 12–38	Uruguay; W 33–17	3 Q	Australia; L 0–18	Classification semifinal Ireland; L 14–17	Seventh place match Argentina; L 0–19	8
United States women	Women's tournament	Japan; W 36–7	Brazil; W 24–5	France; L 14–31	2 Q	Great Britain; W 17–7	New Zealand; L 12–24	Bronze medal final Australia; W 14–12	3rd place, bronze medalist(s)

=== Men's tournament ===
The United States men's national rugby sevens team qualified for the Olympics by winning the gold medal and securing an outright berth at the 2023 North American Championships in Langford, British Columbia.

Team roster

USA's squad of 12 players was named on 1 July 2024. Additionally, Adam Channel and Pita Vi were named as traveling reserves.

Head coach: Mike Friday

No.	Player	Date of birth (age)
1	Aaron Cummings	1 July 1997 (aged 27)
2	Maka Unufe	28 September 1991 (aged 32)
3	Orrin Bizer	13 December 2000 (aged 23)
4	Matai Leuta	20 July 1990 (aged 34)
5	Marcus Tupuola	5 October 1995 (aged 28)
6	Kevon Williams (c)	7 June 1991 (aged 33)
7	Naima Fuala'au	17 June 1998 (aged 26)
8	Malacchi Esdale	4 May 1995 (aged 29)
9	Stephen Tomasin	25 September 1994 (aged 29)
10	Madison Hughes	26 October 1992 (aged 31)
11	Perry Baker	29 June 1986 (aged 38)
12	Lucas Lacamp	4 June 2001 (aged 23)
13	Pita Vi	31 January 2002 (aged 22)
14	Adam Channel	16 January 1997 (aged 27)

Group stage

Pos	Team	Pld	W	D	L	PF	PA	PD	Pts	Qualification
1	Fiji	3	3	0	0	97	36	+61	9	Advance to Quarter-finals
2	France (H)	3	1	1	1	43	43	0	6	Advance to Quarter-finals
3	United States	3	1	1	1	57	67	−10	6	Advance to Quarter-finals
4	Uruguay	3	0	0	3	41	92	−51	3	

Source: World Rugby
Rules for classification: 1) Points; 2) Head-to-head result; 3) Point difference; 4) Points scored.
(H) Hosts

24 July 2024
16:30

France	12–12	United States
Try: Sepho 4' m Rebbadj 8' c Con: Barraque (1/2) 8'	World Rugby	Try: Lacamp 7' c Tupuola 12' m Con: Tomasin (1/1) 7'

Stade de France, Paris
Attendance: 69,000
Referee: Adam Leal (England/Great Britain)

24 July 2024
20:30

Fiji	38–12	United States
Try: Teba 2' m Rasaku 4' c Ravutaumada 5' m Raisuqe 7' m Baleiwairiki 8' m Nacuqu 10' c Con: Teba (4/5) 3', 5', 7', 9'	World Rugby	Try: Bizer 5' c Baker 11' m Con: Hughes (1/1) 12'

Stade de France, Paris
Attendance: 69,000
Referee: Jordan Way (Australia)

25 July 2024
15:00

United States	33–17	Uruguay
Try: Baker (4) 1' c, 8' c, 11' c, 14' m Lacamp 8' c Con: Tomasin (4/5) 1', 9', 9', 11'	World Rugby	Try: Amaya (2) 3' m, 13' m Basso 5' c Con: Lijtenstein (1/2) 6'

Stade de France, Paris
Attendance: 70,000
Referee: Jérémy Rozier (France)

Ranking of third-placed teams

Pos	Grp	Team	Pld	W	D	L	PF	PA	PD	Pts	Qualification
1	C	United States	3	1	1	1	57	67	−10	6	Advance to Quarter-finals
2	A	South Africa	3	1	0	2	59	32	+27	5	Advance to Quarter-finals
3	B	Samoa	3	1	0	2	52	49	+3	5	

Source: World Rugby
Rules for classification: 1) Points; 2) Point difference; 3) Points scored.

Quarterfinal

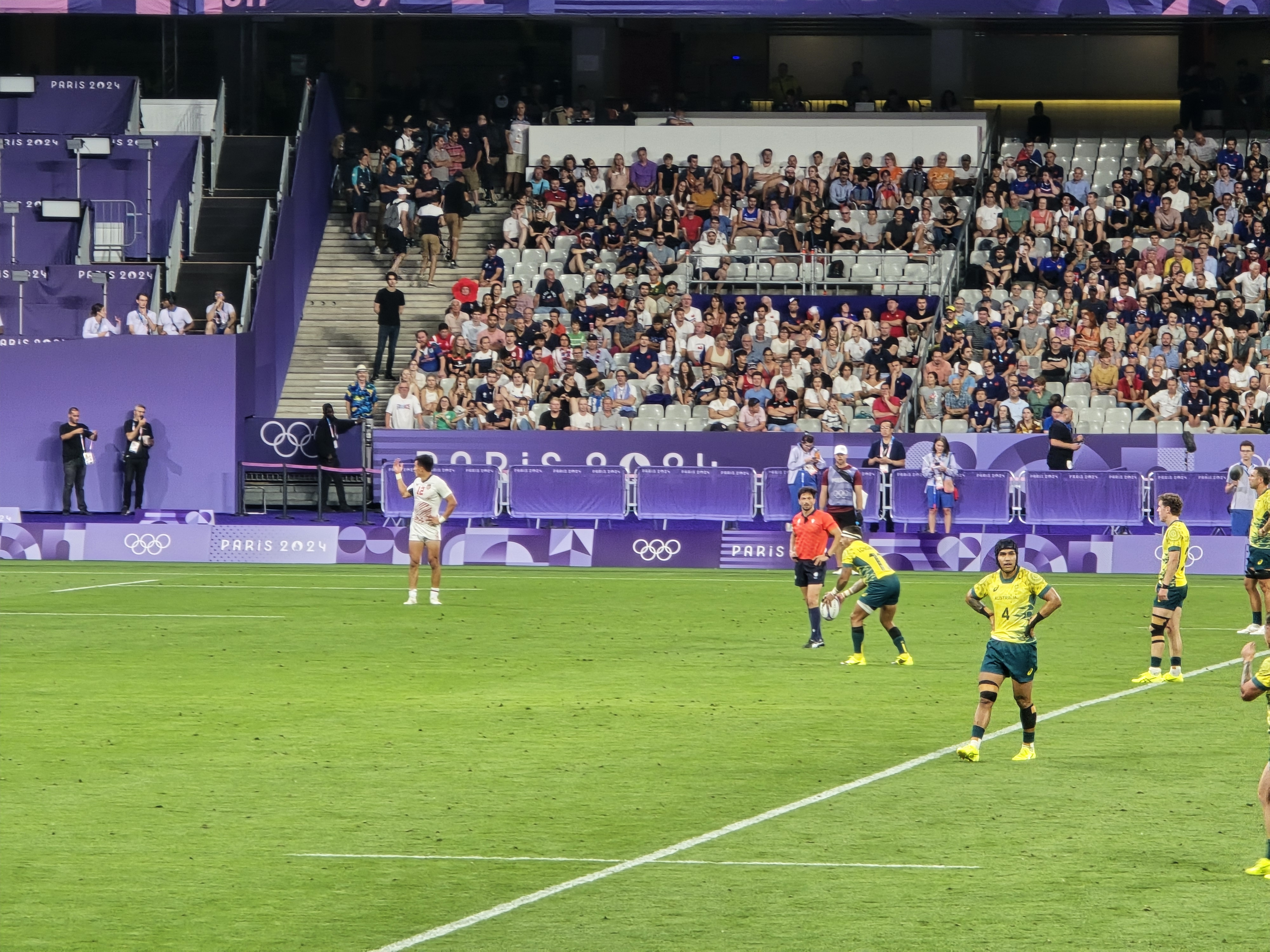
Australia take a penalty against the United States

25 July 2024
22:30

Australia	18–0	United States
Try: Turner 5' m Toole 13' m Longbottom 15' m Pen: Longbottom (1/1) 14'	World Rugby

Stade de France, Paris
Attendance: 70,000
Referee: Jérémy Rozier (France)

5–8th place classification semifinal

27 July 2024
15:00

Ireland	17–14	United States
Try: Lennox 1' c Ward 14' m Kennedy 15' m Con: Lennox (1/1) 1'	World Rugby	Try: Cummings 7' c Baker 11' c Con: Tomasin (2/2) 8', 12'

Stade de France, Paris
Referee: Fransisco Gonzalez (Uruguay)

Seventh place match

27 July 2024
18:00

Argentina	19–0	United States
Try: Osadczuk (2) 7' c, 9' c Isgro 13' m Con: Wade (2/2) 8', 9'	World Rugby

Stade de France, Paris
Referee: Nick Hogan (New Zealand)

=== Women's tournament ===
The United States women's national rugby sevens team qualified for the Olympics by advancing to the quarterfinal phase of the Hong Kong leg and securing a top-four placement at the 2022–23 World Rugby Women's Sevens Series.

Team roster

USA's squad of 12 players was named on 17 June 2024. Additionally, Nicole Heavirland and Kristen Thomas were named as traveling reserves.

Head coach: Emilie Bydwell

- Alena Olsen
- Alev Kelter
- Ariana Ramsey
- Ilona Maher
- Kayla Canett
- Kristi Kirshe
- Lauren Doyle (c)
- Naya Tapper (c)
- Sammy Sullivan
- Sarah Levy
- Spiff Sedrick
- Stephanie Rovetti

Group stage

Pos	Team	Pld	W	D	L	PF	PA	PD	Pts	Qualification
1	France (H)	3	3	0	0	106	14	+92	9	Quarter-finals
2	United States	3	2	0	1	74	43	+31	7	Quarter-finals
3	Japan	3	1	0	2	46	97	−51	5	
4	Brazil	3	0	0	3	17	89	−72	3	

Source: World Rugby
Rules for classification: 1) Points; 2) Head-to-head result; 3) Point difference; 4) Points scored.
(H) Hosts

28 July 2024
16:30

United States	36–7	Japan
Try: Levy 3' m Kirshe (2) 4' c, 6' m Sullivan 8' m Maher 9' c Sedrick 12' c Con: Canett (3/6) 5', 10', 13'	World Rugby	Try: Mizutani 2' c Con: Utsumi (1/1) 2'

Stade de France, Paris
Referee: George Selwood (England/Great Britain)

28 July 2024
20:00

United States	24–5	Brazil
Try: Kelter 1' m Sullivan 8' c Maher 11' m Sedrick 15' c Con: Kelter (2/3) 9', 15'	World Rugby	Try: Thalia Costa 6' m

Stade de France, Paris
Referee: Tyler Miller (Australia)

29 July 2024
15:30

France	31–14	United States
Try: Okemba (4) 7', 8', 9' c, 14' c Jacquet 11' c Con: Drouin (2/4) 9', 11'; Yengo (1/1) 15'	World Rugby	Try: Maher 3' c Tapper 13' c Con: Canett (1/1) 3'; Olsen (1/1) 13'

Stade de France, Paris
Referee: Craig Chan (Hong Kong)

Quarterfinal

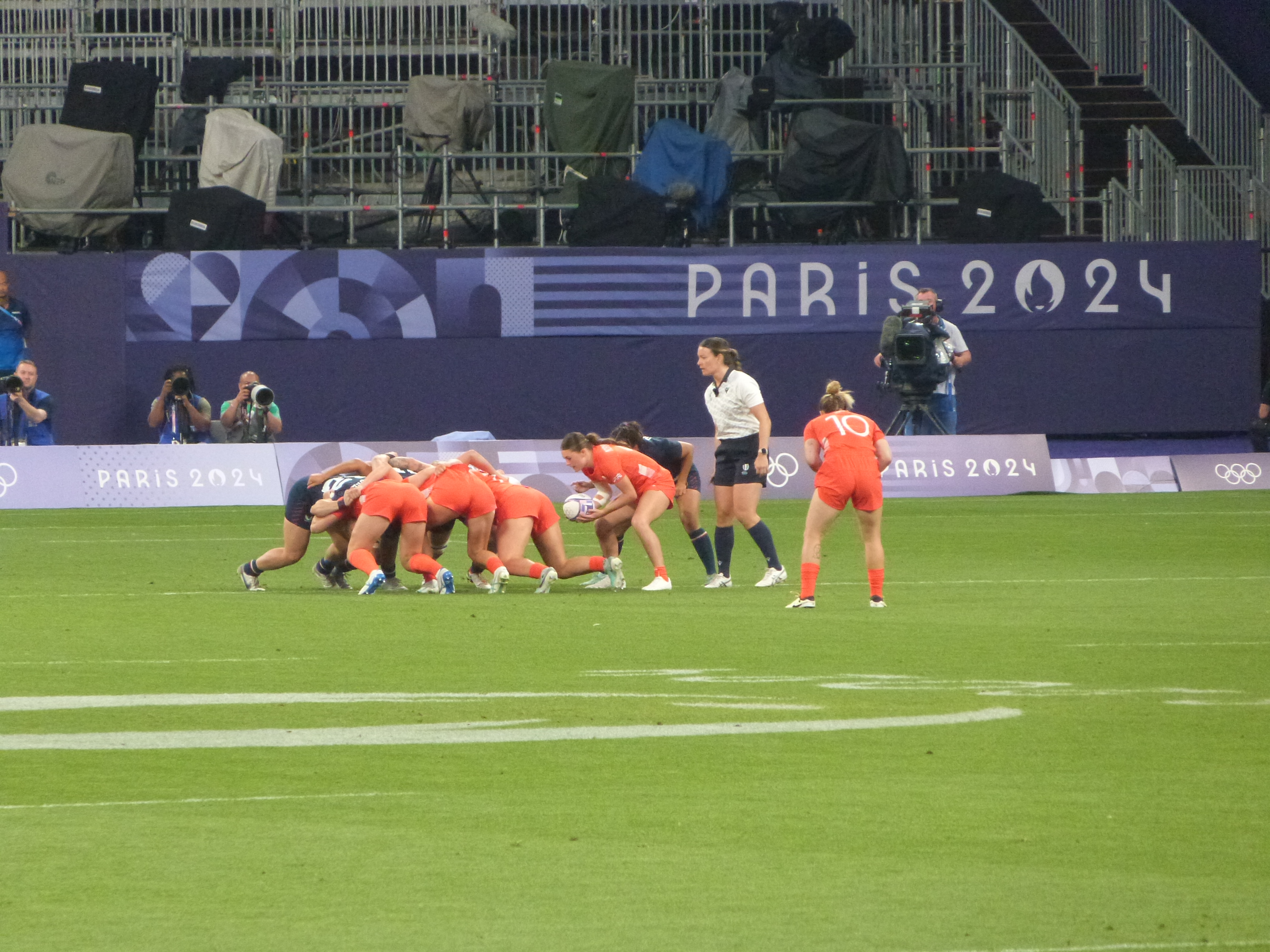
Great Britain scrum against the United States

29 July 2024
21:30

Great Britain	7–17	United States
Try: Boatman 2' c Con: Thomson (1/1) 2'	World Rugby	Try: Tapper 6' m Kirshe 8' c Sullivan 11' m Con: Canett (1/1) 8'

Stade de France, Paris
Referee: Maggie Cogger-Orr (New Zealand)

Semifinal

30 July 2024
15:30

New Zealand	24–12	United States
Try: Waaka (2) 5' c, 8' m Blyde (2) 11' c, 13' m Con: Pouri-Lane (1/1) 6'; King (1/3) 11'	World Rugby	Try: Kelter (2) 3' m Kirshe 15' c Con: Olsen (1/1) 16'

Stade de France, Paris
Referee: Craig Chan (Hong Kong)

Bronze medal final

30 July 2024
19:00

United States	14–12	Australia
Try: Kelter 6' c Sedrick 15' c Con: Kelter (1/1) 7', Sedrick (1/1) 15' c	World Rugby	Try: M. Levi (2) 2' c, 13' m Con: Hinds (1/2) 2'

Stade de France, Paris
Referee: Craig Chan (Hong Kong)

== Sailing ==
A total of 13 American sailors qualified in each of the following classes via the 2023 Sailing World Championships in The Hague, Netherlands; 2023 Pan American Games in Santiago, Chile; and 2024 470 World Championships in Palma de Mallorca, Spain.

=== Elimination races ===
Athlete	Event	Opening series																						Quarterfinal	Semifinal								Final							
Athlete	Event	1	2	3	4	5	6	7	8	9	10	11	12	13	14	15	16	17	18	19	20	Net points	Rank	Rank	1	2	3	4	5	6	Total	Rank	1	2	3	4	5	6	Total	Rank
Noah Lyons	Men's IQFoil	5	1	8	13	12	3	9	6	~~BFD~~	11	6	14	~~22~~	Cancelled							88	7 QF	5	—N/a							EL	—N/a							EL
Markus Edegran	Men's Formula Kite	13	11	7	~~16~~	6	3	3	Cancelled													31	9 SF	—N/a	4	Cancelled					4	EL	—N/a							EL
Dominique Stater	Women's IQFoil	11	~~22~~	20	6	21	16	~~DNF~~	22	20	12	18	8	20	14	Cancelled						188	22	EL	—N/a							EL	—N/a							EL
Daniela Moroz	Women's Formula Kite	~~7~~	3	4	1	2	7	Cancelled														17	3 SF	—N/a	1	Cancelled						1 F	3	4.1 SCP	Cancelled				7.1	4

Qualification legend: QF - Qualify to quarterfinal; SF - Qualify to semifinal; F - Qualify to final

=== Medal races ===
Athlete	Event	Race													Net points	Final rank
Athlete	Event	1	2	3	4	5	6	7	8	9	10	11	12	M*	Net points	Final rank
Ian Barrows; Hans Henken	49er	8	7	~~17~~	9	9	5	10	7	3	2	8	11	8	88	3rd place, bronze medalist(s)
Erika Reineke	ILCA 6	13	25	18	3	4	7	~~BFD~~	2	25	Can	—N/a		12	110	9
Stephanie Roble; Maggie Shea	49erFX	7	11	10	3	9	13	15	13	~~17~~	8	7	9	20	125	10
Lara Dallman-Weiss; Stuart McNay	470	9	17	4	13	11	6	~~18~~	12	Can		—N/a		EL	72	13
David Liebenberg; Sarah Newberry Moore	Nacra 17	10	16	18	14	13	16	11	~~UFD~~	15	3	12	13	EL	141	16

Key: M - Medal race; EL - Eliminated, did not advance into the medal race

== Shooting ==
U.S. shooters have achieved quota places for the following events based on their results at the 2022 and 2023 ISSF World Championships, 2022 and 2024 Championships of the Americas, 2023 Pan American Games, and 2024 ISSF World Olympic Qualification Tournament. The first five athletes were named in January 2024. The U.S. shooting squad will be named based on the aggregate scores obtained by the shooters at two stages of the 2023–24 Olympic Trials (fall and spring).

On March 18, 2024, Vincent Hancock received a spot. Ivan Roe, Sagen Maddalena, and Katelyn Abeln also qualified for the Olympics at the 2024 Team Trials. Additionally, five athletes qualified in smallbore events; Ada Korkhin and Henry Leverett earned their spots in May 2024.

Men

Athlete	Event	Qualification		Final	
Athlete	Event	Points	Rank	Points	Rank
Rylan Kissell	10 m air rifle	626.3	35	Did not advance	
Ivan Roe	10 m air rifle	626.3	34	Did not advance	
Rylan Kissell	50 m rifle 3 positions	579-25x	38	Did not advance	
Ivan Roe	50 m rifle 3 positions	587-32x	20	Did not advance	
Henry Leverett	25 m rapid fire pistol	573-16x	25	Did not advance	
Keith Sanderson	25 m rapid fire pistol	579-16x	19	Did not advance	
Will Hinton	Trap	116	27	Did not advance	
Derrick Mein	Trap	122 (+13)	6 Q	26	5
Vincent Hancock	Skeet	123	4 Q	58	1st place, gold medalist(s)
Conner Prince	Skeet	124 (+12)	1 Q	57	2nd place, silver medalist(s)

Women

Athlete	Event	Qualification		Final	
Athlete	Event	Points	Rank	Points	Rank
Sagen Maddalena	10 m air rifle	631.4	7 Q	207.7	4
Mary Tucker	10 m air rifle	625.2	32	Did not advance	
Sagen Maddalena	50 m rifle 3 positions	593-45x OR	1 Q	463.0	2nd place, silver medalist(s)
Mary Tucker	50 m rifle 3 positions	579-20x	25	Did not advance	
Katelyn Abeln	10 m air pistol	570-16x	24	Did not advance	
Alexis Lagan	10 m air pistol	570-15x	25	Did not advance	
Katelyn Abeln	25 m pistol	585-19x	8 Q	5	8
Ada Korkhin	25 m pistol	571-17x	32	Did not advance	
Ryann Phillips	Trap	116	16	Did not advance	
Rachel Tozier	Trap	116	18	Did not advance	
Austen Smith	Skeet	122 (+14)	1 Q	45	3rd place, bronze medalist(s)
Dania Vizzi	Skeet	118	12	Did not advance	

Mixed

Athlete	Event	Qualification		Final / BM	
Athlete	Event	Points	Rank	Opponent Result	Rank
Sagen Maddalena; Ivan Roe	10 m air rifle team	624.9	18	Did not advance	
Mary Tucker; Rylan Kissell	10 m air rifle team	626.0	13	Did not advance	
Vincent Hancock; Austen Smith	Skeet team	148	2 G	Bacosi / Rossetti (ITA); L 44–45	2nd place, silver medalist(s)
Conner Prince; Dania Vizzi	Skeet team	144	6	Did not advance	

Key: G - Qualify to gold medal match; B - Qualify to bronze medal match

== Skateboarding ==
The United States qualified twelve skateboarders (six per gender) to compete in each of the following events at the Games. The members will be decided in U.S. skateboarding team.

Men

Athlete	Event	Qualification		Final	
Athlete	Event	Score	Rank	Score	Rank
Gavin Bottger	Park	86.95	10	Did not advance	
Tate Carew	Park	90.42	4 Q	91.17	5
Tom Schaar	Park	92.05	2 Q	92.23	2nd place, silver medalist(s)
Jagger Eaton	Street	274.88	1 Q	281.04	2nd place, silver medalist(s)
Nyjah Huston	Street	272.66	2 Q	279.38	3rd place, bronze medalist(s)
Chris Joslin	Street	50.84	21	Did not advance	

Women

Athlete	Event	Qualification		Final	
Athlete	Event	Score	Rank	Score	Rank
Ruby Lilley	Park	75.07	13	Did not advance	
Minna Stess	Park	54.71	19	Did not advance	
Bryce Wettstein	Park	85.65	2 Q	88.12	6
Mariah Duran	Street	58.36	22	Did not advance	
Paige Heyn	Street	244.29	6 Q	163.23	6
Poe Pinson	Street	241.12	8 Q	222.34	5

== Sport climbing ==
The U.S. qualified eight climbers for the 2024 Summer Olympics. Colin Duffy and Emma Hunt secured their spots in the men's combined and women's speed after winning silver medals at the 2023 World Championships in Bern, Switzerland; Piper Kelly, Samuel Watson, Natalia Grossman, and Jesse Grupper qualified for Paris in the women's speed, men's speed, women's combined, and men's combined after winning gold medals at the 2023 Pan American Games in Santiago, Chile; and Brooke Raboutou and Zach Hammer qualified for the games through the 2024 Olympic Qualifier Series ranking.

=== Boulder & lead combined ===
Athlete	Event	Semifinal						Final					
Athlete	Event	Boulder		Lead		Total	Rank	Boulder		Lead		Total	Rank
Athlete	Event	Points	Rank	Points	Rank	Total	Rank	Points	Rank	Points	Rank	Total	Rank
Colin Duffy	Men's	33.8	11	54.1	6	87.9	7 Q	68.3	2	68.1	7	136.4	4
Jesse Grupper	Men's	18.9	18	21.0	17	30.9	18	Did not advance					
Natalia Grossman	Women's	69.2	5	39.1	18	108.3	11	Did not advance					
Brooke Raboutou	Women's	83.7	3	72.1	4	155.8	3 Q	84.0	2	72.0	5	156.0	2nd place, silver medalist(s)

=== Speed ===
Athlete	Event	Qualification		Round of 16	Quarterfinals	Semifinals	Final / BM	
Athlete	Event	Time	Rank	Opposition Time	Opposition Time	Opposition Time	Opposition Time	Rank
Zach Hammer	Men's	6.05	12	Watson (USA); L F–4.75	Did not advance			14
Sam Watson	Men's	4.91	3	Hammer (USA); W 4.75 WR–F	David (NZL); W 5.03–5.65	Wu (CHN); L 4.93–4.85	Bronze medal final Alipour (IRI); W 4.74 WR–4.88	3rd place, bronze medalist(s)
Emma Hunt	Women's	6.36	2	Lebon (FRA); W 6.38–7.07	Sallsabillah (INA); L 7.98–6.54	Did not advance		5
Piper Kelly	Women's	7.39	9	Dewi (INA); L 8.43–6.38	Did not advance			13

== Surfing ==
The U.S. has qualified five surfers (three female and two male) to the Olympic sailing competition in Tahiti. The first quota was awarded for the victory in the women's team event at the 2022 ISA World Surfing Games in Huntington Beach, California, and the other three quotas were awarded after finishing among the top eight (women) and top ten (men) of those eligible for qualification in the 2023 World Surf League rankings.

Athlete	Event	Round 1		Round 2	Round 3	Quarterfinal	Semifinal	Final / BM	
Athlete	Event	Score	Rank	Opposition Result	Opposition Result	Opposition Result	Opposition Result	Opposition Result	Rank
Griffin Colapinto	Men's shortboard	17.03	1 R3	Bye	Vaast (FRA); L 13.83–15.10	Did not advance			
John John Florence	Men's shortboard	17.33	1 R3	Bye	Robinson (AUS); L 9.07–13.94	Did not advance			
Caroline Marks	Women's shortboard	17.93	1 R3	Bye	Yang (CHN); W 6.93–1.63	Wright (AUS); W 7.77–5.37	Defay (FRA); W 12.17^{(7.00)}–12.17^{(6.50)}	Weston-Webb (BRA); W 10.50–10.33	1st place, gold medalist(s)
Carissa Moore	Women's shortboard	16.50	1 R3	Bye	Baum (RSA); W 8.16–3.87	Defay (FRA); L 6.50–10.34	Did not advance		
Caitlin Simmers	Women's shortboard	12.93	1 R3	Bye	Weston-Webb (BRA); L 1.93–12.34	Did not advance			

Qualification legend: R3 - Qualifies to elimination rounds; R2 - Qualifies to repechage round

== Swimming ==
Katie Grimes became the first U.S. athlete to qualify by name for the Games after placing third at the 2023 World Aquatics Championships. The U.S. swim team was decided at the 2024 United States Olympic Trials held in Indianapolis, Indiana between June 15, 2024, and June 23, 2024. The top two finishers in each event qualified for the Games. The athlete and coach roster final announced on June 24, 2024.

U.S. swimmers have achieved the entry standards in the following events for Paris 2024 (a maximum of two swimmers under the Olympic Qualifying Time (OST) and potentially the Olympic Consideration Time (OCT)):

The men's team won gold in the 4x100 meter freestyle relay on July 27, 2024, clinching the first gold medal for the United States at the Paris games. This final medal haul of the U.S. men's team in the pool was the lowest since 1956.

Men

Athlete	Event	Heat		Semifinal		Final	
Athlete	Event	Time	Rank	Time	Rank	Time	Rank
Caeleb Dressel	50 m freestyle	21.91	13 Q	21.58	5 Q	21.61	6
Chris Guiliano	50 m freestyle	21.97	17	Did not advance			
Jack Alexy	100 m freestyle	47.57	1 Q	47.68	6 Q	47.96	7
Chris Guiliano	100 m freestyle	48.25	=8 Q	47.72	7 Q	47.98	8
Chris Guiliano	200 m freestyle	1:47.60	19	Did not advance			
Luke Hobson	200 m freestyle	1:46.23	=7 Q	1:45.19	3 Q	1:44.79	3rd place, bronze medalist(s)
Aaron Shackell	400 m freestyle	3:45.45	6 Q	—N/a		3:47.00	8
Kieran Smith	400 m freestyle	3:46.47	11	—N/a		Did not advance	
Bobby Finke	800 m freestyle	7:43.00	5 Q	—N/a		7:38.75	2nd place, silver medalist(s)
Luke Whitlock	800 m freestyle	7:49.26	15	—N/a		Did not advance	
Bobby Finke	1500 m freestyle	14:45.31	6 Q	—N/a		14:30.67 WR	1st place, gold medalist(s)
David Johnston	1500 m freestyle	15:10.64	18	—N/a		Did not advance	
Hunter Armstrong	100 m backstroke	53.34	9 Q	53.11	11	Did not advance	
Ryan Murphy	100 m backstroke	53.06	4 Q	52.72	5 Q	52.39	3rd place, bronze medalist(s)
Keaton Jones	200 m backstroke	1:57.54	11 Q	1:56.39	6 Q	1:55.39	5
Ryan Murphy	200 m backstroke	1:57.03	5 Q	1:56.62	10	Did not advance	
Nic Fink	100 m breaststroke	59.66	10 Q	59.16	4 Q	59.05	= (silver)
Charlie Swanson	100 m breaststroke	59.92	14 Q	1:00.16	14	Did not advance	
Matthew Fallon	200 m breaststroke	2:10.49	11 Q	2:09.96	=10	Did not advance	
Josh Matheny	200 m breaststroke	2:10.39	10 Q	2:09.70	6 Q	2:09.52	7
Caeleb Dressel	100 m butterfly	50.83	6 Q	51.57	13	Did not advance	
Thomas Heilman	100 m butterfly	51.82	18	Did not advance			
Thomas Heilman	200 m butterfly	1:55.74	11 Q	1:54.87	10	Did not advance	
Luca Urlando	200 m butterfly	1:56.18	17	Did not advance			
Shaine Casas	200 m individual medley	1:58.04	5 Q	1:57.82	9	Did not advance	
Carson Foster	200 m individual medley	1:58.63	10 Q	1:56.37	2 Q	1:56.10	4
Carson Foster	400 m individual medley	4:11.07	4 Q	—N/a		4:08.66	3rd place, bronze medalist(s)
Chase Kalisz	400 m individual medley	4:13.36	11	—N/a		Did not advance	
Jack Alexy; Hunter Armstrong; Caeleb Dressel; Chris Guiliano; Ryan Held^{[b]} Matt King^{[b]}	4 × 100 m freestyle relay	3:12.61	4 Q	—N/a		3:09.28	1st place, gold medalist(s)
Brooks Curry^{[b]} Carson Foster; Chris Guiliano^{[b]} Luke Hobson; Drew Kibler; Blake Pieroni^{[b]} Kieran Smith	4 × 200 m freestyle relay	7:05.57	2 Q	—N/a		7:00.78	2nd place, silver medalist(s)
Jack Alexy^{[b]} Hunter Armstrong; Caeleb Dressel; Nic Fink; Thomas Heilman^{[b]} Ryan Murphy; Charlie Swanson^{[b]}	4 × 100 m medley relay	3:31.62	3 Q	—N/a		3:28.01	2nd place, silver medalist(s)
Ivan Puskovitch	10 km open water	—N/a				1:57:52.5	19

Women

Athlete	Event	Heat		Semifinal		Final	
Athlete	Event	Time	Rank	Time	Rank	Time	Rank
Simone Manuel	50 m freestyle	24.587	=18	Did not advance			
Gretchen Walsh	50 m freestyle	24.37	3 Q	24.17	2 Q	24.21	4
Torri Huske	100 m freestyle	53.53	7 Q	52.99	7 Q	52.29	2nd place, silver medalist(s)
Gretchen Walsh	100 m freestyle	53.54	8 Q	53.18	8 Q	53.04	8
Erin Gemmell	200 m freestyle	1:57.23	11 Q	1:56.46	9	Did not advance	
Claire Weinstein	200 m freestyle	1:56.48	6 Q	1:55.24	3 Q	1:56.60	8
Katie Ledecky	400 m freestyle	4:02.19	1 Q	—N/a		4:00.86	3rd place, bronze medalist(s)
Paige Madden	400 m freestyle	4:03.34	6 Q	—N/a		4:02.26	6
Katie Ledecky	800 m freestyle	8:16.62	1 Q	—N/a		8:11.04	1st place, gold medalist(s)
Paige Madden	800 m freestyle	8:18.48	2 Q	—N/a		8:13.00	3rd place, bronze medalist(s)
Katie Grimes	1500 m freestyle	16:12.11	10	—N/a		Did not advance	
Katie Ledecky	1500 m freestyle	15:47.43	1 Q	—N/a		15:30.02 OR	1st place, gold medalist(s)
Katharine Berkoff	100 m backstroke	57.99	1 Q	58.27	3 Q	57.98	3rd place, bronze medalist(s)
Regan Smith	100 m backstroke	58.45	2 Q	57.97	1 Q	57.66	2nd place, silver medalist(s)
Phoebe Bacon	200 m backstroke	2:09.00	4 Q	2:07.32	1 Q	2:05.61	4
Regan Smith	200 m backstroke	2:09.61	6 Q	2:08.14	6 Q	2:04.26	2nd place, silver medalist(s)
Lilly King	100 m breaststroke	1:06.10	5 Q	1:05.64	3 Q	1:05.60	=4
Emma Weber	100 m breaststroke	1:07.65	23	Did not advance			
Kate Douglass	200 m breaststroke	2:23.44	3 Q	2:19.74	1 Q	2:19.24 AM	1st place, gold medalist(s)
Lilly King	200 m breaststroke	2:24.91	11 Q	2:23.25	6 Q	2:25.91	8
Torri Huske	100 m butterfly	56.72	3 Q	56.00	2 Q	55.59	1st place, gold medalist(s)
Gretchen Walsh	100 m butterfly	56.75	4 Q	55.38 OR	1 Q	55.63	2nd place, silver medalist(s)
Alex Shackell	200 m butterfly	2:07.49	5 Q	2:06.46	5 Q	2:07.73	6
Regan Smith	200 m butterfly	2:06.99	2 Q	2:05.39	2 Q	2:03.84 NR	2nd place, silver medalist(s)
Kate Douglass	200 m individual medley	2:10.70	5 Q	2:08.59	3 Q	2:06.92	2nd place, silver medalist(s)
Alex Walsh	200 m individual medley	2:10.48	3 Q	2:07.45	1 Q	DSQ	
Katie Grimes	400 m individual medley	4:37.24	2 Q	—N/a		4:33.40	2nd place, silver medalist(s)
Emma Weyant	400 m individual medley	4:36.27	1 Q	—N/a		4:34.93	3rd place, bronze medalist(s)
Erika Connolly^{[b]} Kate Douglass; Torri Huske; Simone Manuel; Gretchen Walsh; Abbey Weitzeil^{[b]}	4 × 100 m freestyle relay	3:33.29	2 Q	—N/a		3:30.20 AM	2nd place, silver medalist(s)
Erin Gemmell; Katie Ledecky; Paige Madden; Simone Manuel^{[b]} Anna Peplowski^{[b]} Alex Shackell^{[b]} Claire Weinstein	4 × 200 m freestyle relay	7:52.72	4 Q	—N/a		7:40.86	2nd place, silver medalist(s)
Katharine Berkoff^{[b]} Kate Douglass^{[b]} Torri Huske; Lilly King; Alex Shackell^{[b]} Regan Smith; Gretchen Walsh; Emma Weber^{[b]}	4 × 100 m medley relay	3:56.40	4 Q	—N/a		3:49.63 WR	1st place, gold medalist(s)
Mariah Denigan	10 km open water	—N/a				2:06:42.9	16
Katie Grimes	10 km open water	—N/a				2:06:29.6	15

Mixed

Athlete	Event	Heat		Final	
Athlete	Event	Time	Rank	Time	Rank
Caeleb Dressel^{[b]} Nic Fink; Torri Huske; Ryan Murphy; Regan Smith^{[b]} Charlie Swanson^{[b]} Gretchen Walsh; Abbey Weitzeil^{[b]}	4 × 100 m medley relay	3:40.98	1 Q	3:37.43 WR	1st place, gold medalist(s)

^{b} Swimmers who participated in the heats only.

== Table tennis ==
The United States entered a full women's squad into the table tennis competition at the Games after their performance in the women's team competition at the 2023 Pan American Table Tennis Championship in Havana, Cuba.

Athlete	Event	Preliminary	Round of 64	Round of 32	Round of 16	Quarterfinals	Semifinals	Final / BM	
Athlete	Event	Opposition Result	Opposition Result	Opposition Result	Opposition Result	Opposition Result	Opposition Result	Opposition Result	Rank
Kanak Jha	Men's singles	Ursu (MDA); W 4–0	Cho (KOR); W 4–2	Gionis (GRE); W 4–2	Fan (CHN); L 0–4	Did not advance			
Amy Wang	Women's singles	Bye	Tommy (VAN); W 4–0	Díaz (PUR); L 2–4	Did not advance				
Lily Zhang	Women's singles	Bye	Sahakian (LBN); W 4–0	B Takahashi (BRA); W 4–2	Shin (KOR); L 0–4	Did not advance			
Rachel Sung; Amy Wang; Lily Zhang	Women's team	—N/a			Germany; L 2–3	Did not advance			

== Taekwondo ==
The United States has qualified four taekwondo athletes to compete at the Paris Games. CJ Nickolas secured his spot by virtue of finishing within the top five in his respective division of the Olympic rankings. Later on, Kristina Teachout, Faith Dillon, and Jonathan Healy secured their spots, each in their respective weight class, by winning the semifinal matches at the 2024 Pan American Qualification Tournament in Santo Domingo, Dominican Republic.

Athlete	Event	Qualification	Round of 16	Quarterfinals	Semifinals	Repechage	Final / BM	
Athlete	Event	Opposition Result	Opposition Result	Opposition Result	Opposition Result	Opposition Result	Opposition Result	Rank
CJ Nickolas	Men's −80 kg	Bye	Mansouri (EOR); W 2–0	Sawadogo (BUR); W 2–0	Katoussi (TUN); L 0–2	Bye	Bronze medal match Alessio (ITA); L 0–2	4
Jonathan Healy	Men's +80 kg	Bye	Song (CHN); W 2–1	Cissé (CIV); L 0–2	Did not advance			
Faith Dillon	Women's −57 kg	—N/a	Toumi (TUN); L 1–2	Did not advance				
Kristina Teachout	Women's −67 kg	—N/a	Wiet-Hénin (FRA); W 2–0	Márton (HUN); L 1–2	Did not advance	Gbagbi (CIV); W 2–1	Bronze medal match Song (CHN); W 2–0	3rd place, bronze medalist(s)

== Tennis ==
The main qualifying criterion will be the players' positions on the ATP and WTA ranking lists published on June 10, 2024.Coco Gauff and Taylor Fritz were the top qualifiers for the lead the U.S. tennis team at the 2024 Paris Olympics.

Men

Athlete	Event	Round of 64	Round of 32	Round of 16	Quarterfinals	Semifinals	Final / BM	
Athlete	Event	Opposition Score	Opposition Score	Opposition Score	Opposition Score	Opposition Score	Opposition Score	Rank
Christopher Eubanks	Singles	Hassan (LBN); L 4–6, 2–6	Did not advance					
Taylor Fritz	Singles	Bublik (KAZ); W 6–4, 6–4	Draper (GBR); W 6–7^{(3–7)}, 6–3, 6–2	Musetti (ITA); L 4–6, 5–7	Did not advance			
Marcos Giron	Singles	Auger-Aliassime (CAN); L 1–6, 4–6	Did not advance					
Tommy Paul	Singles	Darderi (ITA); W 6–3, 6–4	Menšík (CZE); W 6–3, 6–1	Moutet (FRA); W 7–6^{(7–5)}, 6–3	Alcaraz (ESP); L 3–6, 6–7^{(7–9)}	Did not advance		
Taylor Fritz; Tommy Paul	Doubles	—N/a	Auger-Aliassime / Raonic (CAN); W 7–6^{(16–14)}, 6–4	Haase / Rojer (NED); W 6–3, 6–4	Evans / Murray (GBR); W 6–2, 6–4	Ebden / Peers (AUS); L 5–7, 2–6	Bronze medal match Macháč / Pavlásek (CZE); W 6–3, 6–4	3rd place, bronze medalist(s)
Austin Krajicek; Rajeev Ram	Doubles	—N/a	de Minaur / Popyrin (AUS); W 6–2, 6–3	Monteiro / Seyboth Wild (BRA); W 6–4, 7–6^{(7–3)}	Alcaraz / Nadal (ESP); W 6–2, 6–4	Macháč / Pavlásek (CZE); W 6–2, 6–2	Ebden / Peers (AUS); L 7–6^{(8–6)}, 6–7^{(1–7)}, [8–10]	2nd place, silver medalist(s)

Women

Athlete	Event	Round of 64	Round of 32	Round of 16	Quarterfinals	Semifinals	Final / BM	
Athlete	Event	Opposition Score	Opposition Score	Opposition Score	Opposition Score	Opposition Score	Opposition Score	Rank
Danielle Collins	Singles	Siegemund (GER); W 6–3, 2–0, ret	Wozniacki (DEN); W 6–3, 3–6, 6–3	Osorio (COL); W 6–0, 4–6, 6–3	Świątek (POL); L 1–6, 6–2, 1–4 ret	Did not advance		
Coco Gauff	Singles	Tomljanović (AUS); W 6–3, 6–0	Carlé (ARG); W 6–1, 6–1	Vekić (CRO); L 6–7^{(7–9)}, 2–6	Did not advance			
Emma Navarro	Singles	Grabher (AUT); W 6–2, 6–0	Tomova (BUL); W 6–7^{(5–7)}, 6–4, 6–1	Zheng (CHN); L 7–6^{(9–7)}, 6–7^{(4–7)}, 1–6	Did not advance			
Jessica Pegula	Singles	Golubic (SUI); W 6–3, 6–4	Svitolina (UKR); L 6–4, 1–6, 3–6	Did not advance				
Danielle Collins; Desirae Krawczyk	Doubles	—N/a	Papamichail / Sakkari (GRE); W 6–1, 6–3	L Kichenok / N Kichenok (UKR); L 6–3, 4–6, [7–10]	Did not advance			
Coco Gauff; Jessica Pegula	Doubles	—N/a	Perez / Saville (AUS); W 6–3, 6–1	Muchová / Nosková (CZE); L 6–2, 4–6, [5–10]	Did not advance			

Mixed

Athlete	Event	Round of 16	Quarterfinal	Semifinal	Final / BM	
Athlete	Event	Opposition Score	Opposition Score	Opposition Score	Opposition Score	Rank
Taylor Fritz; Coco Gauff	Doubles	González / Podoroska (ARG); W 6–1, 6–7^{(6–8)}, [10–5]	Auger-Aliassime / Dabrowski (CAN); L 6–7^{(2–7)}, 6–3, [8–10]	Did not advance		

== Triathlon ==
The United States has confirmed five quota places (two men's and three women's) in the triathlon events for Paris.

Morgan Pearson and Taylor Knibb qualified for the 2024 U.S. Olympic Triathlon Team at the 2023 World Triathlon Olympic Games Test Event in Paris. Knibb also qualified in the sport of cycling, making her a rare dual-sport Olympian. The team was announced on June 5, 2024.

Individual

Athlete	Event	Time						Rank
Athlete	Event	Swim (1.5 km)	Trans 1	Bike (40 km)	Trans 2	Run (10 km)	Total	Rank
Morgan Pearson	Men's	21:30	0:47	54:35	0:30	31:04	1:48:26	31
Seth Rider	Men's	20:30	0:53	52:00	0:27	34:03	1:47:53	29
Kirsten Kasper	Women's	22:39	0:53	1:05:47	0:31	36:48	2:06:38	49
Taylor Knibb	Women's	24:08	0:56	57:45	0:31	35:17	1:58:37	19
Taylor Spivey	Women's	22:43	0:57	58:04	0:30	34:57	1:57:11	10

Relay

Athlete	Event	Time						Rank
Athlete	Event	Swim (300 m)	Trans 1	Bike (7 km)	Trans 2	Run (2 km)	Total	Rank
Taylor Knibb	Mixed relay	4:50	1:10	10:08	0:27	5:38	22:13	—N/a
Morgan Pearson	Mixed relay	4:33	0:58	9:32	0:24	5:00	20:27	—N/a
Seth Rider	Mixed relay	4:09	1:07	9:38	0:24	5:01	20:19	—N/a
Taylor Spivey	Mixed relay	5:00	1:12	10:25	0:25	5:39	22:41	—N/a
Total	Mixed relay	—N/a					1:25:40	2nd place, silver medalist(s)

== Volleyball ==
=== Beach ===
The U.S. men's and women's pairs qualified for Paris via the 2023 FIVB Beach Volleyball World Championships and based on the FIVB Beach Volleyball Olympic Ranking. The team was announced on June 10, 2024.

Former basketball player Chase Budinger became the first person to have played a regular-season game in the NBA and Olympic beach volleyball.

Athletes	Event	Preliminary round				LL	Round of 16	Quarterfinal	Semifinal	Final / BM	
Athletes	Event	Opposition Score	Opposition Score	Opposition Score	Rank	Opposition Score	Opposition Score	Opposition Score	Opposition Score	Opposition Score	Rank
Andy Benesh; Miles Partain	Men's	Alayo / Díaz (CUB); L (18–21, 18–21)	Abicha / El Graoui (MAR); W (21–12, 28–26)	Stein / Wanderley (BRA); W (21–17, 14–21, 15–8)	2 Q	Bye	Cottafava / Nicolai (ITA); W (21–17, 21–18)	Tijan / Younousse (QAT); L (14–21, 16–21)	Did not advance		5
Chase Budinger; Miles Evans	Men's	Gauthier-Rat / Krou (FRA); W (21–14, 21–11)	Boermans / De Groot (NED); L (13–21, 15–21)	Gavira / Herrera (ESP); L (18–21, 11–21)	3 LL	Hodges / Schubert (AUS); W (21–19, 21–17)	Mol / Sørum (NOR); L (16–21, 14–21)	Did not advance			9
Kelly Cheng; Sara Hughes	Women's	Hermannová / Štochlová (CZE); W (21–16, 21–11)	Chamereau / Vieira (FRA); W (21–16, 23–21)	Müller / Tillmann (GER); W (21–18, 21–18)	1 Q	Bye	Gottardi / Menegatti (ITA); W (21–18, 17–21, 15–12)	Brunner / Hüberli (SUI); L (18–21, 19–21)	Did not advance		5
Taryn Kloth; Kristen Nuss	Women's	Bansley / Bukovec (CAN); W (21–17, 21–14)	Artacho / Clancy (AUS); W (21–16, 21–16)	Xia / Xue (CHN); W (15–21, 21–16, 15–12)	1 Q	Bye	Humana-Paredes / Wilkerson (CAN); L (19–21, 18–21)	Did not advance			9

=== Indoor ===
Summary

Team	Event	Group stage				Quarterfinal	Semifinal	Final / BM	
Team	Event	Opposition Score	Opposition Score	Opposition Score	Rank	Opposition Score	Opposition Score	Opposition Score	Rank
United States men	Men's tournament	Argentina; W 3–0	Germany; W 3–2	Japan; W 3–1	1 Q	Brazil; W 3–1	Poland; L 2–3	Bronze medal match Italy; W 3–0	3rd place, bronze medalist(s)
United States women	Women's tournament	China; L 2–3	Serbia; W 3–2	France; W 3–0	2 Q	Poland; W 3–0	Brazil; W 3–2	Italy; L 0–3	2nd place, silver medalist(s)

==== Men's tournament ====
The United States men's volleyball team qualified for Paris by securing an outright berth as one of the two highest-ranked nations at the 2023 Olympic Qualification Tournament in Tokyo, Japan.

Team roster
The roster was announced on 10 May 2024.

Head coach: John Speraw

- 1 Matt Anderson OP
- 2 Aaron Russell OH
- 4 Jeffrey Jendryk MB
- 8 Torey DeFalco OH
- 11 Micah Christenson (c) S
- 12 Maxwell Holt MB
- 14 Micah Maʻa S
- 17 Thomas Jaeschke OH
- 18 Garrett Muagututia OH
- 19 Taylor Averill MB
- 20 David Smith MB
- 22 Erik Shoji L

Group play

Pos	Team	Pld	W	L	Pts	SW	SL	SR	SPW	SPL	SPR	Qualification
1	United States	3	3	0	8	9	3	3.000	270	232	1.164	Quarterfinals
2	Germany	3	2	1	6	8	5	1.600	287	264	1.087	Quarterfinals
3	Japan	3	1	2	4	6	7	0.857	278	292	0.952	Quarterfinals
4	Argentina	3	0	3	0	1	9	0.111	196	243	0.807	

Source: Olympics
Rules for classification: Tiebreakers

27 July 2024; 21:00	United States	3–0	Argentina	South Paris Arena 1, Paris; Attendance: 9,464; Referees: Stefano Cesare (ITA), Wojciech Maroszek (POL)
27 July 2024; 21:00	(25–20, 25–19, 25–16); P2 Report			South Paris Arena 1, Paris; Attendance: 9,464; Referees: Stefano Cesare (ITA), Wojciech Maroszek (POL)

30 July 2024; 13:00	United States	3–2	Germany	South Paris Arena 1, Paris; Attendance: 9,275; Referees: Scott Dziewirz (CAN), Vladimir Simonović (SUI)
30 July 2024; 13:00	(25–21, 25–17, 17–25, 20–25, 15–11); P2 Report			South Paris Arena 1, Paris; Attendance: 9,275; Referees: Scott Dziewirz (CAN), Vladimir Simonović (SUI)

2 August 2024; 21:00	Japan	1–3	United States	South Paris Arena 1, Paris; Attendance: 9,369; Referees: Ivaylo Ivanov (BUL), Juraj Mokrý (SVK)
2 August 2024; 21:00	(16–25, 18–25, 25–18, 19–25); P2 Report			South Paris Arena 1, Paris; Attendance: 9,369; Referees: Ivaylo Ivanov (BUL), Juraj Mokrý (SVK)

Quarterfinal

5 August 2024; 21:00	United States	3–1	Brazil	South Paris Arena 1, Paris; Attendance: 9,346; Referees: Vladimir Simonović (SUI), Fabrice Collados (FRA)
5 August 2024; 21:00	(26–24, 28–30, 25–19, 25–19); P2 Report			South Paris Arena 1, Paris; Attendance: 9,346; Referees: Vladimir Simonović (SUI), Fabrice Collados (FRA)

Semifinal

7 August 2024; 16:00	Poland	3–2	United States	South Paris Arena 1, Paris; Attendance: 9,333; Referees: Stefano Cesare (ITA), Fabrice Collados (FRA)
7 August 2024; 16:00	(25–23, 25–27, 14–25, 25–23, 15–13); P2 Report			South Paris Arena 1, Paris; Attendance: 9,333; Referees: Stefano Cesare (ITA), Fabrice Collados (FRA)

Bronze medal match

9 August 2024; 16:00	Italy	0–3	United States	South Paris Arena 1, Paris; Attendance: 9,376; Referees: Ivaylo Ivanov (BUL), Epaminondas Gerothodoros (GRE)
9 August 2024; 16:00	(23–25, 28–30, 24–26); P2 Report			South Paris Arena 1, Paris; Attendance: 9,376; Referees: Ivaylo Ivanov (BUL), Epaminondas Gerothodoros (GRE)

==== Women's tournament ====
The United States women's volleyball team qualified for the Games by securing an outright berth as the one of two highest-ranked nations at the 2023 Olympic Qualification Tournament in Łódź, Poland.

Team roster
The roster was announced on 5 June 2024.

Head coach: Karch Kiraly

- 2 Jordyn Poulter S
- 3 Avery Skinner OH
- 4 Justine Wong-Orantes L
- 7 Lauren Carlini S
- 10 Jordan Larson (c) OH
- 11 Annie Drews OP
- 12 Jordan Thompson OP
- 15 Haleigh Washington MB
- 16 Dana Rettke MB
- 22 Kathryn Plummer OH
- 23 Kelsey Robinson Cook OH
- 24 Chiaka Ogbogu MB

Group play

Pos	Team	Pld	W	L	Pts	SW	SL	SR	SPW	SPL	SPR	Qualification
1	China	3	3	0	8	9	3	3.000	277	249	1.112	Quarter-finals
2	United States	3	2	1	6	8	5	1.600	286	278	1.029	Quarter-finals
3	Serbia	3	1	2	4	6	6	1.000	271	257	1.054	Quarter-finals
4	France (H)	3	0	3	0	0	9	0.000	183	233	0.785	

Source: Olympics
Rules for classification: Tiebreakers
(H) Host

29 July 2024; 17:00	United States	2–3	China	South Paris Arena 1, Paris; Attendance: 9,434; Referees: Sumie Myoi (JPN), Karina Rene (ARG)
29 July 2024; 17:00	(20–25, 19–25, 25–17, 25–20, 13–15); P2 Report			South Paris Arena 1, Paris; Attendance: 9,434; Referees: Sumie Myoi (JPN), Karina Rene (ARG)

31 July 2024; 17:00	United States	3–2	Serbia	South Paris Arena 1, Paris; Attendance: 9,384; Referees: Juraj Mokrý (SVK), Karina Rene (ARG)
31 July 2024; 17:00	(25–17, 25–20, 20–25, 14–25, 17–15); P2 Report			South Paris Arena 1, Paris; Attendance: 9,384; Referees: Juraj Mokrý (SVK), Karina Rene (ARG)

4 August 2024; 13:00	France	0–3	United States	South Paris Arena 1, Paris; Attendance: 9,402; Referees: Ivaylo Ivanov (BUL), Scott Dziewirz (CAN)
4 August 2024; 13:00	(27–29, 27–29, 20–25); P2 Report			South Paris Arena 1, Paris; Attendance: 9,402; Referees: Ivaylo Ivanov (BUL), Scott Dziewirz (CAN)

Quarterfinal

6 August 2024; 17:00	United States	3–0	Poland	South Paris Arena 1, Paris; Attendance: 9,244; Referees: Karina Rene (ARG), Vladimir Simonović (SUI)
6 August 2024; 17:00	(25–22, 25–14, 25–20); P2 Report			South Paris Arena 1, Paris; Attendance: 9,244; Referees: Karina Rene (ARG), Vladimir Simonović (SUI)

Semifinal

8 August 2024; 16:00	Brazil	2–3	United States	South Paris Arena 1, Paris; Attendance: 9,253; Referees: Juraj Mokrý (SVK), Karina Rene (ARG)
8 August 2024; 16:00	(23–25, 25–18, 15–25, 25–23, 11–15); P2 Report			South Paris Arena 1, Paris; Attendance: 9,253; Referees: Juraj Mokrý (SVK), Karina Rene (ARG)

Gold medal game

11 August 2024; 13:00	United States	0–3	Italy	South Paris Arena 1, Paris; Attendance: 9,340; Referees: Fabrice Collados (FRA), Wojciech Maroszek (POL)
11 August 2024; 13:00	(18–25, 20–25, 17–25); P2 Report			South Paris Arena 1, Paris; Attendance: 9,340; Referees: Fabrice Collados (FRA), Wojciech Maroszek (POL)

== Water polo ==
Summary

Key:
- FT – After full time.
- P – Match decided by penalty-shootout.

Team	Event	Group stage						Quarterfinal	Semifinal	Final / BM	
Team	Event	Opposition Score	Opposition Score	Opposition Score	Opposition Score	Opposition Score	Rank	Opposition Score	Opposition Score	Opposition Score	Rank
United States men	Men's tournament	Italy; L 8–12	Romania; W 14–8	Greece; L 11–13	Montenegro; W 12–7	Croatia; W 14–11	3 Q	Australia; W 11–10	Serbia; L 6–10	Bronze medal match Hungary; W 11–8	3rd place, bronze medalist(s)
United States women	Women's tournament	Greece; W 15–6	Spain; L 11–13	Italy; W 10–3	France; W 17–5	—N/a	2 Q	Hungary; W 5–4	Australia; L 13–14	Bronze medal match Netherlands; L 10–11	4

=== Men's tournament ===
The United States men's water polo team qualified for the Olympics after winning the gold medal at the 2023 Pan American Games in Santiago, Chile.

Team roster
The roster was announced on 18 June 2024.

Head coach: Dejan Udovičić

No.	Player	Pos.	L/R	Height	Weight	Date of birth (age)	Apps	OG/ Goals	Club	Ref
1	Adrian Weinberg	GK	R	1.96 m (6 ft 5 in)	95 kg (209 lb)	25 November 2001 (aged 22)			(United States) Pride WP	
2	Johnny Hooper	AT	R	1.88 m (6 ft 2 in)	88 kg (194 lb)	24 June 1997 (aged 27)			(Italy) Telimar Palermo	
3	Marko Vavic	AT	R	1.98 m (6 ft 6 in)	103 kg (227 lb)	25 April 1999 (aged 25)			(Italy) RN Savona	
4	Alex Obert	CF	R	1.96 m (6 ft 5 in)	105 kg (231 lb)	18 December 1991 (aged 32)			(United States) NYAC	
5	Hannes Daube	AT	R	1.98 m (6 ft 6 in)	106 kg (234 lb)	5 January 2000 (aged 24)			(Croatia) Jug Dubrovnik	
6	Luca Cupido	AT	R	1.91 m (6 ft 3 in)	97 kg (214 lb)	9 November 1995 (aged 28)			(Italy) CC Ortigia	
7	Ben Hallock (c)	CF	R	1.98 m (6 ft 6 in)	115 kg (254 lb)	22 November 1997 (aged 26)			(Italy) Pro Recco	
8	Dylan Woodhead	AT	R	2.01 m (6 ft 7 in)	100 kg (220 lb)	25 September 1998 (aged 25)			(Greece) NC Vouliagmeni	
9	Alex Bowen	AT	R	1.96 m (6 ft 5 in)	106 kg (234 lb)	4 September 1993 (aged 30)			(France) CN Noisy-le-Sec	
10	Chase Dodd	FP	R	1.94 m (6 ft 4 in)	104 kg (229 lb)	5 April 2003 (aged 21)			(United States) Vanguard	
11	Ryder Dodd	FP	R	1.83 m (6 ft 0 in)	93 kg (205 lb)	19 January 2006 (aged 18)			(United States) Mission WPC	
12	Max Irving	AT	R	1.85 m (6 ft 1 in)	81 kg (179 lb)	21 May 1995 (aged 29)			(Italy) AN Brescia	
13	Drew Holland	GK	R	1.96 m (6 ft 5 in)	83 kg (183 lb)	11 April 1995 (aged 29)			(Greece) G.S. Peristeri	

Group play

Pos	Team	Pld	W	PSW	PSL	L	GF	GA	GD	Pts	Qualification
1	Greece	5	3	1	0	1	61	52	+9	11 (Note: Greece 9–8 Italy)	Quarterfinals
2	Italy	5	3	1	0	1	60	43	+17	11	Quarterfinals
3	United States	5	3	0	0	2	59	51	+8	9 (Note: Croatia 11–14 United States)	Quarterfinals
4	Croatia	5	3	0	0	2	58	57	+1	9	Quarterfinals
5	Montenegro	5	1	0	2	2	45	50	−5	5	
6	Romania	5	0	0	0	5	37	67	−30	0	

Source: Olympics
Rules for classification: 1) Points; 2) Head-to-head points; 3) Head-to-head goal difference; 4) Head-to-head goals scored; 5) Goal difference.
Notes:

28 July 2024; 15:00 v	Report	Italy	12–8	United States	Paris Aquatic Centre, Paris; Referees: Tamás Kovács (HUN), Vojin Putniković (SRB)
28 July 2024; 15:00 v	Report	Score by quarters: 4–2, 1–1, 4–1, 3–4			Paris Aquatic Centre, Paris; Referees: Tamás Kovács (HUN), Vojin Putniković (SRB)
28 July 2024; 15:00 v	Report	three players 2	Goals	Daube 3	Paris Aquatic Centre, Paris; Referees: Tamás Kovács (HUN), Vojin Putniković (SRB)

30 July 2024; 16:35 v	Report	United States	14–8	Romania	Paris Aquatic Centre, Paris; Referees: David Gómez (ESP), Nicholas Hodgers (AUS)
30 July 2024; 16:35 v	Report	Score by quarters: 3–3, 3–0, 4–1, 4–4			Paris Aquatic Centre, Paris; Referees: David Gómez (ESP), Nicholas Hodgers (AUS)
30 July 2024; 16:35 v	Report	Bowen, Daube 3	Goals	Colodrovschi, Georgescu 3	Paris Aquatic Centre, Paris; Referees: David Gómez (ESP), Nicholas Hodgers (AUS)

1 August 2024; 10:30 v	Report	Greece	13–11	United States	Paris Aquatic Centre, Paris; Referees: David Gómez (ESP), Sébastien Dervieux (FRA)
1 August 2024; 10:30 v	Report	Score by quarters: 4–4, 3–2, 4–3, 2–2			Paris Aquatic Centre, Paris; Referees: David Gómez (ESP), Sébastien Dervieux (FRA)
1 August 2024; 10:30 v	Report	Argyropoulos 4	Goals	Bowen, Irving 2	Paris Aquatic Centre, Paris; Referees: David Gómez (ESP), Sébastien Dervieux (FRA)

3 August 2024; 16:35 v	Report	Montenegro	7–12	United States	Paris Aquatic Centre, Paris; Referees: Frank Ohme (GER), Zhang Liang (CHN)
3 August 2024; 16:35 v	Report	Score by quarters: 1–4, 1–3, 4–3, 1–2			Paris Aquatic Centre, Paris; Referees: Frank Ohme (GER), Zhang Liang (CHN)
3 August 2024; 16:35 v	Report	Đurđić 3	Goals	Daube 5	Paris Aquatic Centre, Paris; Referees: Frank Ohme (GER), Zhang Liang (CHN)

5 August 2024; 18:30 v	Report	Croatia	11–14	United States	Paris La Défense Arena, Paris; Referees: Sébastien Dervieux (FRA), Frank Ohme (GER)
5 August 2024; 18:30 v	Report	Score by quarters: 2–5, 3–5, 2–1, 4–3			Paris La Défense Arena, Paris; Referees: Sébastien Dervieux (FRA), Frank Ohme (GER)
5 August 2024; 18:30 v	Report	Kharkov 5	Goals	Daube, Irving 3	Paris La Défense Arena, Paris; Referees: Sébastien Dervieux (FRA), Frank Ohme (GER)

Quarterfinal

7 August 2024; 19:00 v	Report	United States	11–10 (PSO)	Australia	Paris La Défense Arena, Paris; Referees: Rafaele Colombo (ITA), Sébastien Dervieux (FRA)
7 August 2024; 19:00 v	Report	Score by quarters: 1–3, 2–2, 2–0, 2–2 PSO: 4–3			Paris La Défense Arena, Paris; Referees: Rafaele Colombo (ITA), Sébastien Dervieux (FRA)
7 August 2024; 19:00 v	Report	Bowen, Daube 2	Goals	Pavillard 4	Paris La Défense Arena, Paris; Referees: Rafaele Colombo (ITA), Sébastien Dervieux (FRA)

Semifinal

9 August 2024; 14:35 v	Report	Serbia	10–6	United States	Paris La Défense Arena, Paris; Referees: Georgios Stavridis (GRE), Rafaele Colombo (ITA)
9 August 2024; 14:35 v	Report	Score by quarters: 2–2, 4–2, 2–2, 2–0			Paris La Défense Arena, Paris; Referees: Georgios Stavridis (GRE), Rafaele Colombo (ITA)
9 August 2024; 14:35 v	Report	Dedović 4	Goals	Vavic 2	Paris La Défense Arena, Paris; Referees: Georgios Stavridis (GRE), Rafaele Colombo (ITA)

Bronze medal game

11 August 2024; 10:35 v	Report	United States	11–8 (PSO)	Hungary	Paris La Défense Arena, Paris; Referees: Sébastien Dervieux (FRA), David Gómez (ESP)
11 August 2024; 10:35 v	Report	Score by quarters: 3–2, 1–1, 2–2, 2–3 PSO: 3–0			Paris La Défense Arena, Paris; Referees: Sébastien Dervieux (FRA), David Gómez (ESP)
11 August 2024; 10:35 v	Report	Hallock 2	Goals	Varga, Zalánki 2	Paris La Défense Arena, Paris; Referees: Sébastien Dervieux (FRA), David Gómez (ESP)

=== Women's tournament ===
The United States women's water polo team qualified for the Olympics after winning the gold medal at the 2023 Pan American Games in Santiago, Chile.

Team roster

The squad was announced on 30 May 2024.

Head coach: Adam Krikorian

No.	Player	Pos.	L/R	Height	Weight	Date of birth (age)	Apps	OG/ Goals	Club	Ref
1	Ashleigh Johnson	GK	R	1.85 m (6 ft 1 in)	81 kg (179 lb)	12 September 1994 (aged 29)			(United States) NYAC	
2	Maddie Musselman	AT	R	1.80 m (5 ft 11 in)	65 kg (143 lb)	16 June 1998 (aged 26)			(United States) NYAC	
3	Tara Prentice	CF	R	1.83 m (6 ft 0 in)		20 December 1997 (aged 26)			(United States) NYAC	
4	Rachel Fattal	AT	R	1.73 m (5 ft 8 in)	65 kg (143 lb)	10 December 1993 (aged 30)			(United States) NYAC	
5	Jenna Flynn	D	R	1.73 m (5 ft 8 in)		11 June 2004 (aged 20)			(United States) NYAC	
6	Maggie Steffens (C)	AT	R	1.73 m (5 ft 8 in)	74 kg (163 lb)	4 June 1993 (aged 31)			(United States) NYAC	
7	Jordan Raney	DF	R	1.78 m (5 ft 10 in)		2 June 1996 (aged 28)			(United States) NYAC	
8	Ryann Neushul	AT	R	1.71 m (5 ft 7 in)		30 December 1999 (aged 24)			(United States) NYAC	
9	Jewel Roemer	D	R	1.67 m (5 ft 6 in)		8 February 2002 (aged 22)			(United States) 680 Water Polo	
10	Kaleigh Gilchrist	AT	R	1.75 m (5 ft 9 in)	77 kg (170 lb)	16 May 1992 (aged 32)			(United States) NYAC	
11	Emily Ausmus	AT	R	1.75 m (5 ft 9 in)		12 December 2005 (aged 18)			(United States) NYAC	
12	Jovana Sekulic	CF	R	1.83 m (6 ft 0 in)		7 November 2002 (aged 21)			(United States) NYAC	
13	Amanda Longan	GK	R	1.88 m (6 ft 2 in)		16 January 1997 (aged 27)			(United States) NYAC	

Group play

Pos	Team	Pld	W	PSW	PSL	L	GF	GA	GD	Pts	Qualification
1	Spain	4	4	0	0	0	51	36	+15	12	Quarterfinals
2	United States	4	3	0	0	1	53	27	+26	9	Quarterfinals
3	Italy	4	1	0	0	3	34	40	−6	3 (Note: Greece 3 Pts, +3 GD; Italy 3 Pts, +3 GD; France 3 Pts, −6 GD. Italy ranked above Greece due to more goals scored.)	Quarterfinals
4	Greece	4	1	0	0	3	33	41	−8	3	Quarterfinals
5	France (H)	4	1	0	0	3	24	51	−27	3	

Source: Olympics
Rules for classification: 1) Points; 2) Head-to-head points; 3) Head-to-head goal difference; 4) Head-to-head goals scored; 5) Goal difference.
(H) Host
Notes:

27 July 2024; 15:35 v	Report	Greece	6–15	United States	Paris Aquatic Centre, Paris; Referees: Nóra Debreceni (HUN), Frank Ohme (GER)
27 July 2024; 15:35 v	Report	Score by quarters: 0–3, 2–6, 2–3, 2–3			Paris Aquatic Centre, Paris; Referees: Nóra Debreceni (HUN), Frank Ohme (GER)
27 July 2024; 15:35 v	Report	six players 1	Goals	Flynn 4	Paris Aquatic Centre, Paris; Referees: Nóra Debreceni (HUN), Frank Ohme (GER)

29 July 2024; 15:35 v	Report	United States	11–13	Spain	Paris Aquatic Centre, Paris; Referees: Adrian Alexandrescu (ROU), Andrej Franulović (CRO)
29 July 2024; 15:35 v	Report	Score by quarters: 3–2, 2–4, 4–5, 2–2			Paris Aquatic Centre, Paris; Referees: Adrian Alexandrescu (ROU), Andrej Franulović (CRO)
29 July 2024; 15:35 v	Report	Raney 2	Goals	Ortiz 5	Paris Aquatic Centre, Paris; Referees: Adrian Alexandrescu (ROU), Andrej Franulović (CRO)

31 July 2024; 18:30 v	Report	Italy	3–10	United States	Paris Aquatic Centre, Paris; Referees: Hélène Painchaud (CAN), Vojin Putniković (SRB)
31 July 2024; 18:30 v	Report	Score by quarters: 1–3, 1–3, 0–2, 1–2			Paris Aquatic Centre, Paris; Referees: Hélène Painchaud (CAN), Vojin Putniković (SRB)
31 July 2024; 18:30 v	Report	Marletta 2	Goals	Musselman 3	Paris Aquatic Centre, Paris; Referees: Hélène Painchaud (CAN), Vojin Putniković (SRB)

2 August 2024; 18:30 v	Report	United States	17–5	France	Paris Aquatic Centre, Paris; Referees: Veselin Mišković (MNE), Nicholas Hodgers (AUS)
2 August 2024; 18:30 v	Report	Score by quarters: 3–1, 4–2, 6–2, 4–0			Paris Aquatic Centre, Paris; Referees: Veselin Mišković (MNE), Nicholas Hodgers (AUS)
2 August 2024; 18:30 v	Report	Musselman 4	Goals	Hertzka 2	Paris Aquatic Centre, Paris; Referees: Veselin Mišković (MNE), Nicholas Hodgers (AUS)

Quarterfinal

6 August 2024; 20:35 v	Report	Hungary	4–5	United States	Paris La Défense Arena, Paris; Referees: Vojin Putniković (SRB), Zhang Liang (CHN)
6 August 2024; 20:35 v	Report	Score by quarters: 2–1, 0–2, 2–1, 0–1			Paris La Défense Arena, Paris; Referees: Vojin Putniković (SRB), Zhang Liang (CHN)
6 August 2024; 20:35 v	Report	four players 1	Goals	Steffens 2	Paris La Défense Arena, Paris; Referees: Vojin Putniković (SRB), Zhang Liang (CHN)

Semifinal

8 August 2024; 19:35 v	Report	Australia	14–13 (PSO)	United States	Paris La Défense Arena, Paris; Referees: Georgios Stavridis (GRE), Tamás Kovács (HUN)
8 August 2024; 19:35 v	Report	Score by quarters: 1–2, 1–3, 4–2, 2–1 PSO: 6–5			Paris La Défense Arena, Paris; Referees: Georgios Stavridis (GRE), Tamás Kovács (HUN)
8 August 2024; 19:35 v	Report	Andrews 4	Goals	Flynn, Musselman 2	Paris La Défense Arena, Paris; Referees: Georgios Stavridis (GRE), Tamás Kovács (HUN)

Bronze medal game

10 August 2024; 10:35 v	Report	United States	10–11	Netherlands	Paris La Défense Arena, Paris; Referees: Marta Cabañas (ESP), Rafaele Colombo (ITA)
10 August 2024; 10:35 v	Report	Score by quarters: 3–2, 4–1, 2–3, 1–5			Paris La Défense Arena, Paris; Referees: Marta Cabañas (ESP), Rafaele Colombo (ITA)
10 August 2024; 10:35 v	Report	three players 2	Goals	Van der Sloot 6	Paris La Défense Arena, Paris; Referees: Marta Cabañas (ESP), Rafaele Colombo (ITA)

== Weightlifting ==
The United States qualified five weightlifters into the Olympic competition. Hampton Morris (men's 61 kg), Wesley Kitts (men's 102 kg), Jourdan Delacruz (women's 49 kg), Olivia Reeves (women's 71 kg), and Mary Theisen-Lappen (women's +81 kg) secured one of the top ten slots, each in their respective weight division based on the IWF Olympic Qualification Rankings.

Athlete	Event	Snatch		Clean & Jerk		Total	Rank
Athlete	Event	Result	Rank	Result	Rank	Total	Rank
Hampton Morris	Men's –61 kg	126	5	172	1	298	3rd place, bronze medalist(s)
Wesley Kitts	Men's −102 kg	172	9	202	8	374	8
Jourdan Delacruz	Women's −49 kg	84	7	111	5	195	5
Olivia Reeves	Women's −71 kg	117 OR	1	145	1	262	1st place, gold medalist(s)
Mary Theisen-Lappen	Women's +81 kg	119	6	155	5	274	5

== Wrestling ==
The United States qualified fifteen wrestlers for each of the following classes into the Olympic competition. Seven of them qualified for the Games by virtue of top five results in their respective division at the 2023 World Championships in Belgrade, Serbia. Meanwhile, six other athletes later qualified by advancing to the final round at the 2024 Pan American Olympic Qualification Tournament in Acapulco, Mexico. The final two wrestlers punched their tickets to Paris by placing in the top three at the 2024 World Wrestling Olympic Qualification Tournament in Istanbul, Turkey.

The final roster was named on April 20, 2024, based on the results of the Olympic Trials, held at the Bryce Jordan Center at Penn State in State College, Pennsylvania on April 19–20, 2024. The team features 2016 Olympic champion Kyle Snyder and two-time World Champion 20-year-old Amit Elor.

Key:

- VT (ranking points: 5–0 or 0–5) – Victory by fall.
- VB (ranking points: 5–0 or 0–5) – Victory by injury (VF for forfeit, VA for withdrawal or disqualification)
- PP (ranking points: 3–1 or 1–3) – Decision by points – the loser with technical points.
- PO (ranking points: 3–0 or 0–3) – Decision by points – the loser without technical points.
- ST (ranking points: 4–0 or 0–4) – Great superiority – the loser without technical points and a margin of victory of at least 8 (Greco-Roman) or 10 (freestyle) points.
- SP (ranking points: 4–1 or 1–4) – Technical superiority – the loser with technical points and a margin of victory of at least 8 (Greco-Roman) or 10 (freestyle) points.

Men

Athlete	Event	Round of 16	Quarterfinal	Semifinal	Repechage	Final / BM	
Athlete	Event	Opposition Result	Opposition Result	Opposition Result	Opposition Result	Opposition Result	Rank
Spencer Lee	Freestyle 57 kg	Zou (CHN); W 3–1^{PP}	Almaz Uulu (KGZ); W 4–1^{SP}	Abdullaev (UZB); W 4–1^{SP}	Bye	Higuchi (JPN); L 1–3^{PP}	2nd place, silver medalist(s)
Zain Retherford	Freestyle 65 kg	Amouzad (IRI); L 0–3^{PO}	Did not advance		Dudaev (ALB); L 0–5^{VB}	Did not advance	8
Kyle Dake	Freestyle 74 kg	Montero (VEN); W 4–0ST	Emami (IRI); W 5–0^{VT}	Takatani (JPN); L 1–3^{PP}	Bye	Bronze medal match Tsabolov (SRB); W 10–4^{PO}	3rd place, bronze medalist(s)
Aaron Brooks	Freestyle 86 kg	Dauletbekov (KAZ); W 3–1^{PP}	Ishiguro (JPN); W 4–1^{SP}	Ramazanov (BUL); L 1–3^{PP}	Bye	Bronze medal match Shapiev (UZB); W 3–0^{PO}	3rd place, bronze medalist(s)
Kyle Snyder	Freestyle 97 kg	Awusayiman (CHN); W 3–1^{PP}	Silot (CUB); W 5–0^{VT}	Tazhudinov (BRN); L 1–3^{PP}	Bye	Bronze medal match Azarpira (IRI); L 1–3^{PP}	T5
Mason Parris	Freestyle 125 kg	Mönkhtöriin (MGL); L 1–3^{PP}	Did not advance				10
Kamal Bey	Greco-Roman 77 kg	Makhmudov (KGZ); L 1–3^{PP}	Did not advance				11
Payton Jacobson	Greco-Roman 87 kg	Komarov (SRB); L 0–4ST	Did not advance				16
Josef Rau	Greco-Roman 97 kg	Saravi (IRI); L 1–4^{SP}	Did not advance		Dzhuzupbekov (KGZ); L 1–3^{PP}	Did not advance	9
Adam Coon	Greco-Roman 130 kg	Mirzazadeh (IRI); L 1–3^{PP}	Did not advance				12

Women

Athlete	Event	Round of 16	Quarterfinal	Semifinal	Repechage	Final / BM	
Athlete	Event	Opposition Result	Opposition Result	Opposition Result	Opposition Result	Opposition Result	Rank
Sarah Hildebrandt	50 kg	Doudou (ALG); W 4–0ST	Feng (CHN); W 3–1^{PP}	Otgonjargal (MGL); W 3–0^{PO}	Bye	Guzmán (CUB); W 3–0^{PO}	1st place, gold medalist(s)
Dominique Parrish	53 kg	Fujinami (JPN); L 0–5^{VT}	Did not advance		Khulan (MGL); L 0–5^{VT}	Did not advance	11
Helen Maroulis	57 kg	Malik (IND); W 3–1^{PP}	Akobiia (UKR); W 3–1^{PP}	Sakurai (JPN); L 1–3^{PP}	Bye	Bronze medal match Taylor (CAN); W 5–0^{VT}	3rd place, bronze medalist(s)
Kayla Miracle	62 kg	Bas (TUR); W 4–1^{SP}	Tynybekova (KGZ); L 1–3^{PP}	Did not advance			7
Amit Elor	68 kg	Tosun (TUR); W 3–1^{PP}	Chołuj (POL); W 3–0^{PO}	Pak (PRK); W 4–0ST	Bye	Zhumanazarova (KGZ); W 3–0^{PO}	1st place, gold medalist(s)
Kennedy Blades	76 kg	Axente (ROM); W 4–0ST	Marín (CUB); W 4–3^{PP}	Medet Kyzy (KGZ); W 3–1^{PP}	Bye	Kagami (JPN); L 1–3^{PP}	2nd place, silver medalist(s)

== See also ==
- United States at the 2023 Pan American Games
- United States at the 2024 Winter Youth Olympics
- United States at the 2024 Summer Paralympics
