= Women's sabre at the 2018 World Fencing Championships =

- Venue: Wuxi Sports Center Indoor Stadium
- Location: Wuxi, China
- Dates: 21 July (qualification); 24 July
- Competitors: 101 from 38 nations

Medalists
| gold medal | Sofia Pozdniakova | Russia |
| silver medal | Sofya Velikaya | Russia |
| bronze medal | Anne-Elizabeth Stone | United States |
| bronze medal | Yana Egorian | Russia |

The Women's sabre event of the 2018 World Fencing Championships was held on 24 July 2018. The qualification was held on 21 July 2018.

== Draw ==
=== Finals ===
Semifinals
(Russia) Sofia Pozdniakova | 15
(United States) Anne-Elizabeth Stone | 6
(Russia) Yana Egorian | 14
(Russia) Sofya Velikaya | 15

Final
(Russia) Sofia Pozdniakova | 15
(Russia) Sofya Velikaya | 13

=== Top half ===
==== Section 1 ====
Round of 64
(Ukraine) Olha Kharlan | 15
(Canada) Marissa Ponich | 7
(Belarus) Darya Andreyeva | 14
(China) Shao Yaqi | 15
(Japan) Norika Tamura | 15
(Argentina) María Belén Pérez Maurice | 9
(Germany) Julika Funke | 13
(Italy) Martina Criscio | 15
(Italy) Irene Vecchi | 15
(Ukraine) Yuliya Bakastova | 7
(Hong Kong) Lam Hin Wai | 7
(Ukraine) Alina Komashchuk | 15
(Singapore) Lau Ywen | 3
(Russia) Sofia Pozdniakova | 15
(United States) Chloe Fox-Gitomer | 8
(United States) Dagmara Wozniak | 15

Round of 32
(Ukraine) Olha Kharlan | 13
(China) Shao Yaqi | 15
(Japan) Norika Tamura | 13
(Italy) Martina Criscio | 15
(Italy) Irene Vecchi | 15
(Ukraine) Alina Komashchuk | 12
(Russia) Sofia Pozdniakova | 15
(United States) Dagmara Wozniak | 10

Round of 16
(China) Shao Yaqi | 15
(Italy) Martina Criscio | 13
(Italy) Irene Vecchi | 12
(Russia) Sofia Pozdniakova | 15

Quarterfinals
(China) Shao Yaqi | 12
(Russia) Sofia Pozdniakova | 15

==== Section 2 ====
Round of 64
(Italy) Rossella Gregorio | 11
(Hong Kong) Chang Karen Ngai Hing | 15
(Hungary) Renáta Katona | 6
(United States) Anne-Elizabeth Stone | 15
(Mexico) Natalia Botello | 10
(Russia) Svetlana Sheveleva | 15
(China) Ma Yingjia | 14
(Germany) Anna Limbach | 15
(Japan) Shihomi Fukushima | 11
(Greece) Theodora Goudoura | 15
(South Korea) Yoon Ji-su | 14
(Poland) Małgorzata Kozaczuk | 15
(Spain) Araceli Nvarro | 13
(Spain) Lucía Martín-Portugués | 15
(Iran) Faezeh Rafiei | 13
(Hungary) Anna Márton | 15

Round of 32
(Hong Kong) Chang Karen Ngai Hing | 12
(United States) Anne-Elizabeth Stone | 15
(Russia) Svetlana Sheveleva | 15
(Germany) Anna Limbach | 8
(Greece) Theodora Goudoura | 15
(Poland) Małgorzata Kozaczuk | 10
(Spain) Lucía Martín-Portugués | 13
(Hungary) Anna Márton | 15

Round of 16
(United States) Anne-Elizabeth Stone | 15
(Russia) Svetlana Sheveleva | 13
(Greece) Theodora Goudoura | 15
(Hungary) Anna Márton | 12

Quarterfinals
(United States) Anne-Elizabeth Stone | 15
(Greece) Theodora Goudoura | 14

=== Bottom half ===
==== Section 3 ====
Round of 64
(Romania) Bianca Pascu | 15
(Canada) Gabriella Page | 12
(Spain) Sandra Marcos | 9
(Bulgaria) Yoana Ilieva | 15
(China) Qian Jiarui | 15
(South Korea) Hwang Seo-na | 10
(India) C. A. Bhavani Devi | 6
(France) Charlotte Lembach | 15
(Russia) Yana Egorian | 15
(Egypt) Nada Hafez | 6
(Georgia (country)) Lika Jijieishvili | 10
(China) Yang Hengyu | 15
(South Korea) Choi Soo-yeon | 15
(Venezuela) Shia Rodríguez | 10
(Turkey) Iryna Shchukla | 15
(South Korea) Kim Ji-yeon | 12

Round of 32
(Romania) Bianca Pascu | 15
(Bulgaria) Yoana Ilieva | 5
(China) Qian Jiarui | 15
(France) Charlotte Lembach | 11
(Russia) Yana Egorian | 15
(China) Yang Hengyu | 14
(South Korea) Choi Soo-yeon | 14
(Turkey) Iryna Shchukla | 15

Round of 16
(Romania) Bianca Pascu | 14
(China) Qian Jiarui | 15
(Russia) Yana Egorian | 15
(Turkey) Iryna Shchukla | 14

Quarterfinals
(China) Qian Jiarui | 12
(Russia) Yana Egorian | 15

==== Section 4 ====
Round of 64
(France) Manon Brunet | 12
(Japan) Risa Takashima | 15
(Italy) Loreta Gulotta | 13
(Poland) Aleksandra Shelton | 15
(United States) Monica Aksamit | 6
(Japan) Chika Aoki | 15
(Indonesia) Diah Permatasari | 6
(Russia) Sofya Velikaya | 15
(Hungary) Liza Pusztai | 15
(Hong Kong) Au Sin Ying | 14
(Iran) Kiana Bagherzadeh | 9
(Greece) Despina Georgiadou | 15
(Poland) Angelika Wątor | 11
(Spain) Laia Vila | 15
(Poland) Marta Puda | 12
(France) Cécilia Berder | 15

Round of 32
(Japan) Risa Takashima | 10
(Poland) Aleksandra Shelton | 15
(Japan) Chika Aoki | 13
(Russia) Sofya Velikaya | 15
(Hungary) Liza Pusztai | 13
(Greece) Despina Georgiadou | 15
(Spain) Laia Vila | 13
(France) Cécilia Berder | 15

Round of 16
(Poland) Aleksandra Shelton | 7
(Russia) Sofya Velikaya | 15
(Greece) Despina Georgiadou | 14
(France) Cécilia Berder | 15

Quarterfinals
(Russia) Sofya Velikaya | 15
(France) Cécilia Berder | 13
