= Women's sabre at the 2019 World Fencing Championships =

- Venue: SYMA Sports and Conference Centre
- Location: Budapest, Hungary
- Dates: 17–20 July

Medalists
gold medal	Olha Kharlan	Ukraine
silver medal	Sofya Velikaya	Russia
bronze medal	Theodora Gkountoura	Greece
bronze medal	Bianca Pascu	Romania

The Women's sabre competition at the 2019 World Fencing Championships was held on 20 July 2019. The qualification was held on 17 July.

== Draw ==
=== Finals ===
Semifinals
(Russia) Sofya Velikaya	15
(Greece) Theodora Gkountoura	11
(Romania) Bianca Pascu	5
(Ukraine) Olha Kharlan	15

Final
(Russia) Sofya Velikaya	14
(Ukraine) Olha Kharlan	15

=== Top half ===
==== Section 1 ====
Round of 64
(Russia) Sofya Velikaya	15
(Japan) Chika Aoki	10
(Hong Kong) Chan Yin Fei	15
(Hungary) Júlia Mikulik	13
(Cuba) Leidis Veranes	15
(Mexico) Natalia Botello	12
(United Kingdom) Caitlin Maxwell	8
(Spain) Araceli Navarro	15
(China) Qian Jiarui	15
(Hong Kong) Lam Hin Wai	7
(Azerbaijan) Valeriya Bolshakova	10
(Italy) Rossella Gregorio	15
(Romania) Andreea Lupu	4
(Turkey) Fatma Köse	15
(Poland) Małgorzata Kozaczuk	12
(Hungary) Anna Márton	15

Round of 32
(Russia) Sofya Velikaya	15
(Hong Kong) Chan Yin Fei	13
(Cuba) Leidis Veranes	14
(Spain) Araceli Navarro	15
(China) Qian Jiarui	10
(Italy) Rossella Gregorio	15
(Turkey) Fatma Köse	4
(Hungary) Anna Márton	15

Round of 16
(Russia) Sofya Velikaya	15
(Spain) Araceli Navarro	9
(Italy) Rossella Gregorio	8
(Hungary) Anna Márton	15

Quarterfinals
(Russia) Sofya Velikaya	15
(Hungary) Anna Márton	7

==== Section 2 ====
Round of 64
(France) Cécilia Berder	15
(Spain) Celia Pérez	10
(South Korea) Yoon Ji-su	11
(Germany) Anna Limbach	15
(Azerbaijan) Anna Bashta	15
(Germany) Lea Krüger	10
(Venezuela) Milagros Pastran	10
(Italy) Irene Vecchi	15
(Greece) Theodora Gkountoura	15
(Venezuela) Jornellys Velásquez	12
(Bulgaria) Yoana Ilieva	12
(Italy) Martina Criscio	15
(Hungary) Renáta Katona	15
(Hong Kong) Au Sin Ying	12
(Turkey) Deniz Ünlüdağ	12
(France) Manon Brunet	15

Round of 32
(France) Cécilia Berder	15
(Germany) Anna Limbach	14
(Azerbaijan) Anna Bashta	15
(Italy) Irene Vecchi	7
(Greece) Theodora Gkountoura	15
(Italy) Martina Criscio	14
(Hungary) Renáta Katona	10
(France) Manon Brunet	15

Round of 16
(France) Cécilia Berder	15
(Azerbaijan) Anna Bashta	11
(Greece) Theodora Gkountoura	15
(France) Manon Brunet	6

Quarterfinals
(France) Cécilia Berder	13
(Greece) Theodora Gkountoura	15

=== Bottom half ===
==== Section 3 ====
Round of 64
(Russia) Sofia Pozdniakova	9
(Canada) Gabriella Page	15
(India) C. A. Bhavani Devi	15
(Tunisia) Azza Besbes	10
(Russia) Olga Nikitina	15
(France) Caroline Queroli	13
(Romania) Bianca Pascu	15
(Russia) Yana Egorian	13
(Hungary) Liza Pusztai	15
(Venezuela) Alejandra Benítez	12
(Turkey) Iryna Shchukla	9
(United States) Mariel Zagunis	15
(France) Charlotte Lembach	15
(Germany) Julika Funke	8
(United States) Aleksandra Shelton	9
(United States) Anne-Elizabeth Stone	15

Round of 32
(Canada) Gabriella Page	14
(India) C. A. Bhavani Devi	15
(Russia) Olga Nikitina	7
(Romania) Bianca Pascu	15
(Hungary) Liza Pusztai	12
(United States) Mariel Zagunis	15
(France) Charlotte Lembach	10
(United States) Anne-Elizabeth Stone	15

Round of 16
(India) C. A. Bhavani Devi	14
(Romania) Bianca Pascu	15
(United States) Mariel Zagunis	14
(United States) Anne-Elizabeth Stone	15

Quarterfinals
(Romania) Bianca Pascu	15
(United States) Anne-Elizabeth Stone	13

==== Section 4 ====
Round of 64
(South Korea) Kim Ji-yeon	15
(Spain) Lucía Martín-Portugués	13
(Poland) Sylwia Matuszak	10
(Ukraine) Alina Komashchuk	15
(Belarus) Palina Kaspiarovich	5
(Georgia (country)) Teodora Kakhiani	15
(Azerbaijan) Sabina Karimova	6
(China) Shao Yaqi	15
(South Korea) Choi Soo-yeon	15
(Japan) Norika Tamura	9
(Spain) Laia Vila	15
(Greece) Despina Georgiadou	14
(China) Jia Xiaoye	12
(Georgia (country)) Lika Jijieishvili	15
(Vietnam) Phùng Thị Khánh Linh	2
(Ukraine) Olha Kharlan	15

Round of 32
(South Korea) Kim Ji-yeon	14
(Ukraine) Alina Komashchuk	15
(Georgia (country)) Teodora Kakhiani	12
(China) Shao Yaqi	15
(South Korea) Choi Soo-yeon	DNF
(Spain) Laia Vila
(Georgia (country)) Lika Jijieishvili	9
(Ukraine) Olha Kharlan	15

Round of 16
(Ukraine) Alina Komashchuk	15
(China) Shao Yaqi	14
(South Korea) Choi Soo-yeon	12
(Ukraine) Olha Kharlan	15

Quarterfinals
(Ukraine) Alina Komashchuk	14
(Ukraine) Olha Kharlan	15
