= Fencing at the 2020 Summer Olympics – Women's sabre =

Fencing at the Olympics

Women's sabre at the Games of the XXXII Olympiad
- Olympic fencing
- Venue: Makuhari Messe
- Date: 26 July 2021
- Competitors: 36 from 18 nations

Medalists
1st place, gold medalist(s)		Sofia Pozdniakova	ROC
2nd place, silver medalist(s)		Sofya Velikaya	ROC
3rd place, bronze medalist(s)		Manon Brunet	France

The women's sabre event at the 2020 Summer Olympics took place on 26 July 2021 at the Makuhari Messe. 36 fencers from 18 nations competed.

== Background ==
This was the 5th appearance of the event, which has been held at every Summer Olympics since being introduced in 2004.

The reigning Olympic champion was Yana Egorian of Russia. The reigning World Champion was Olha Kharlan of Ukraine (also the 2016 Olympic bronze medalist). The 2018 World Champion was Sofia Pozdniakova of Russia. A preview from Olympics.com identified Kharlan as a fencer to watch in 2020.

== Qualification ==
A National Olympic Committee (NOC) could enter up to 3 qualified fencers in the women's sabre. Nations were limited to three fencers each from 1928 to 2004. However, the 2008 Games introduced a rotation of women's team fencing events with one weapon left off each Games; the individual event without a corresponding team event had the number of fencers per nation reduced to two. Women's sabre was the second event this applied to, so each nation could enter a maximum of two fencers in the event in 2012. The 2020 Games eliminated this rotation and all weapons had team events.

There are 34 dedicated quota spots for women's sabre. The first 24 spots go to the 3 members of each of the 8 qualified teams in the team sabre event. Next, 6 more fencers are selected from the world rankings based on continents: 2 from Europe, 1 from the Americas, 2 from Asia/Oceania, and 1 from Africa. Finally, 4 spots are allocated by continental qualifying events: 1 from Europe, 1 from the Americas, 1 from Asia/Oceania, and 1 from Africa. Each nation can earn only one spot through rankings or events.

Additionally, there are 8 host/invitational spots that can be spread throughout the various fencing events. Japan used 2 host places to fill its women's sabre team (adding to the 1 place earned through general qualification).

The COVID-19 pandemic delayed many of the events for qualifying for fencing, moving the close of the rankings period back to April 5, 2021 rather than the original April 4, 2020.

== Competition format ==
The 1996 tournament had vastly simplified the competition format into a single-elimination bracket, with a bronze medal match. The 2020 tournament will continue to use that format. Fencing is done to 15 touches or to the completion of three three-minute rounds if neither fencer reaches 15 touches by then. At the end of time, the higher-scoring fencer is the winner; a tie results in an additional one-minute sudden-death time period. This sudden-death period is further modified by the selection of a draw-winner beforehand; if neither fencer scores a touch during the minute, the predetermined draw-winner wins the bout. Standard sabre rules regarding target area, striking, and priority are used.

== Schedule ==
The competition was held over a single day, Monday, 26 July. The first session ran from 9 a.m. to approximately 4:20 p.m. (when the quarterfinals were expected to conclude), after which there was a break until 6 p.m. before the semifinals and medal bouts were held. Women's sabre bouts alternated with the men's foil event bouts.

All times are Japan Standard Time (UTC+9)

Date	Time	Round
Monday, 26 July 2021	9:00 18:00	Round of 64; Round of 32; Round of 16; Quarterfinals; Semifinals; Finals

== Results ==
=== Finals ===
Semifinals
Sofia Pozdniakova (ROC)	15
Manon Brunet (FRA)	10
Anna Márton (HUN)	8
Sofya Velikaya (ROC)	15

Final
Sofia Pozdniakova (ROC)	15
Sofya Velikaya (ROC)	11
Bronze medal bout
Manon Brunet (FRA)	15
Anna Márton (HUN)	6

=== Top half ===
==== Section 1 ====
Round of 64
Kaouther Mohamed Belkebir (ALG)	1
Yang Hengyu (CHN)	15

Round of 32
Olha Kharlan (UKR)	12
Yang Hengyu (CHN)	15
Rossella Gregorio (ITA)	12
Sofia Pozdniakova (ROC)	15
Qian Jiarui (CHN)	15
Norika Tamura (JPN)	8
Amira Ben Chaabane (TUN)	12
Liza Pusztai (HUN)	15

Round of 16
Yang Hengyu (CHN)	8
Sofia Pozdniakova (ROC)	15
Qian Jiarui (CHN)	15
Liza Pusztai (HUN)	10

Quarterfinals
Sofia Pozdniakova (ROC)	15
Qian Jiarui (CHN)	12

==== Section 2 ====
Round of 64
C. A. Bhavani Devi (IND)	15
Nadia Ben Azizi (TUN)	3

Round of 32
Anne-Elizabeth Stone (USA)	9
Anna Bashta (AZE)	15
Dagmara Wozniak (USA)	14
Olga Nikitina (ROC)	15
Theodora Gkountoura (GRE)	8
Misaki Emura (JPN)	15
C. A. Bhavani Devi (IND)	7
Manon Brunet (FRA)	15

Round of 16
Anna Bashta (AZE)	13
Olga Nikitina (ROC)	15
Misaki Emura (JPN)	12
Manon Brunet (FRA)	15

Quarterfinals
Olga Nikitina (ROC)	5
Manon Brunet (FRA)	15

=== Bottom half ===
==== Section 3 ====
Round of 64
Zaynab Dayibekova (UZB)	15
Chika Aoki (JPN)	9

Round of 32
Shao Yaqi (CHN)	10
Zaynab Dayibekova (UZB)	15
Martina Criscio (ITA)	11
Yoon Ji-su (KOR)	15
Cécilia Berder (FRA)	11
Choi Soo-yeon (KOR)	15
María Belén Pérez Maurice (ARG)	12
Anna Márton (HUN)	15

Round of 16
Zaynab Dayibekova (UZB)	15
Yoon Ji-su (KOR)	12
Choi Soo-yeon (KOR)	12
Anna Márton (HUN)	15

Quarterfinals
Zaynab Dayibekova (UZB)	11
Anna Márton (HUN)	15

==== Section 4 ====
Round of 64
Renáta Katona (HUN)	15
Yasmine Daghfous (TUN)	6

Round of 32
Kim Ji-yeon (KOR)	15
Nada Hafez (EGY)	4
Gabriella Page (CAN)	3
Mariel Zagunis (USA)	15
Charlotte Lembach (FRA)	11
Irene Vecchi (ITA)	15
Renáta Katona (HUN)	4
Sofya Velikaya (ROC)	15

Round of 16
Kim Ji-yeon (KOR)	12
Mariel Zagunis (USA)	15
Irene Vecchi (ITA)	12
Sofya Velikaya (ROC)	15

Quarterfinals
Mariel Zagunis (USA)	8
Sofya Velikaya (ROC)	15
