= Fencing at the 2017 Summer Universiade – Women's individual sabre =

Women's individual sabre at the XXIX Summer Universiade
- Venues: Taipei Nangang Exhibition Center
- Dates: 22 August 2017
- Competitors: 61 from 22 nations

Medalists
1st place, gold medalist(s)		Anna Márton	Hungary
2nd place, silver medalist(s)		Hwang Seon-a	South Korea
3rd place, bronze medalist(s)		Chiara Mormile	Italy
3rd place, bronze medalist(s)		Misaki Emura	Japan

The women's individual sabre fencing event at the 2017 Summer Universiade was held 22 August at the Taipei Nangang Exhibition Center in Taipei, Taiwan.

== Pool Results ==
Qualified for Ranking Round

=== Pool 1 ===
#	Seed	Athlete	1	2	3	4	5	6	7	V#	M#	Ind.	TG	TR	Diff.	RP	RT
1	1	Anna Márton (HUN)		D_{4}	D_{4}	V	V	V	V	4	6	0.667	28	12	16	3	17
2	18	Yana Obvintseva (RUS)	V		D_{2}	V	V	V	V	5	6	0.833	27	18	9	2	15
3	20	Darya Andreyeva (BLR)	V	V		V	V	V	V	6	6	1.000	30	12	18	1	1
4	36	Leanne Singleton-Comfort (USA)	D_{0}	D_{3}	D_{1}		D_{4}	V	V	2	6	0.333	18	20	–2	5	41
5	37	Pang Hui-yi (TPE)	D_{0}	D_{3}	D_{1}	V		V	V	3	6	0.500	19	19	0	4	34
6	55	Onwipha Innurak (THA)	D_{2}	D_{2}	D_{3}	D_{0}	D_{0}		V	1	6	0.167	12	27	–15	6	54
7	56	Shivani Shivani (IND)	D_{0}	D_{1}	D_{1}	D_{0}	D_{0}	D_{2}		0	6	0.000	4	30	–26	7	61

=== Pool 2 ===
#	Seed	Athlete	1	2	3	4	5	6	7	V#	M#	Ind.	TG	TR	Diff.	RP	RT
1	2	Misaki Emura (JPN)		V	V	V	D_{3}	V	V	5	6	0.833	28	12	16	1	4
2	17	Iryna Shchukla (TUR)	D_{3}		V	V	V	V	V	5	6	0.833	28	16	12	2	9
3	19	Petra Zahonyi (HUN)	D_{1}	D_{3}		V	V	V	V	4	6	0.667	24	16	8	3	19
4	35	Angelika Wator (POL)	D_{1}	D_{2}	D_{4}		V	V	V	3	6	0.500	22	19	3	4	30
5	38	Kiana Bagherzadeh (IRI)	V	D_{1}	D_{2}	D_{2}		V	D_{1}	2	6	0.333	16	24	–8	5	45
6	53	Anamarija Šušteršič (SLO)	D_{1}	D_{4}	D_{0}	D_{2}	D_{1}		D_{1}	0	6	0.000	9	30	–21	7	59
7	54	Wu Ya-shiuan (TPE)	D_{1}	D_{1}	D_{0}	D_{0}	V	V		2	6	0.333	12	22	–10	6	47

=== Pool 3 ===
#	Seed	Athlete	1	2	3	4	5	6	7	V#	M#	Ind.	TG	TR	Diff.	RP	RT
1	3	Anna Limbach (GER)		D_{3}	V	D_{3}	D_{1}	V	V	3	6	0.500	22	20	2	3	31
2	16	Renata Katona (HUN)	V		D_{2}	D_{3}	D_{1}	V	D_{0}	2	6	0.333	16	25	–9	6	46
3	21	Sage Palmedo (USA)	D_{2}	V		D_{1}	V	D_{3}	V	3	6	0.500	21	22	–1	4	35
4	33	Risa Takashima (JPN)	V	V	V		D_{4}	V	V	5	6	0.833	29	17	12	2	8
5	39	Najmeh Sazanjian (IRI)	V	V	D_{3}	V		V	V	5	6	0.833	28	14	14	1	7
6	52	Alisa Utlik (BLR)	D_{2}	D_{2}	V	D_{3}	D_{1}		V	2	6	0.333	18	26	–8	5	44
7	57	Yin Panpan (CHN)	D_{1}	V	D_{2}	D_{2}	D_{2}	D_{3}		1	6	0.167	15	25	–10	7	51

=== Pool 4 ===
#	Seed	Athlete	1	2	3	4	5	6	7	V#	M#	Ind.	TG	TR	Diff.	RP	RT
1	4	Shihomi Fukushima (JPN)		V	V	V	V	V	D_{1}	5	6	0.833	26	15	11	1	12
2	15	Caterina Navarria (ITA)	D_{4}		D_{4}	V	D_{4}	V	D_{4}	2	6	0.333	26	24	2	5	40
3	23	Margaux Gimalac (FRA)	D_{3}	V		V	V	V	V	5	6	0.833	28	18	10	2	13
4	34	Aigerim Sarybay (KAZ)	D_{0}	D_{1}	D_{4}		D_{0}	V	D_{1}	1	6	0.167	11	27	–16	6	55
5	40	Katarzyna Kędziora (POL)	D_{3}	V	D_{1}	V		V	D_{4}	3	6	0.500	23	20	3	4	29
6	51	Josna Christy Jose (IND)	D_{0}	D_{3}	D_{1}	D_{2}	D_{1}		D_{4}	0	6	0.000	11	30	–19	7	58
7	59	Park Da-eun (KOR)	V	V	D_{3}	V	V	V		5	6	0.833	28	19	9	3	14

=== Pool 5 ===
#	Seed	Athlete	1	2	3	4	5	6	7	V#	M#	Ind.	TG	TR	Diff.	RP	RT
1	5	Yoon Ji-su (KOR)		D_{4}	D_{4}	D_{4}	V	V	V	3	6	0.500	27	21	6	4	27
2	14	Charleine Taillandier (FRA)	V		D_{3}	V	V	V	V	5	6	0.833	28	17	11	3	11
3	22	Rebecca Gargano (ITA)	V	V		D_{0}	V	V	V	5	6	0.833	25	13	12	2	10
4	32	Olga Nikitina (RUS)	V	D_{2}	V		V	V	V	5	6	0.833	27	11	16	1	5
5	41	Bandhita Srinualad (THA)	D_{1}	D_{2}	D_{0}	D_{0}		D_{3}	V	1	6	0.167	11	25	–14	6	52
6	50	Karina Trois (BRA)	D_{2}	D_{4}	D_{1}	D_{0}	V		V	2	6	0.333	17	24	–7	5	43
7	58	Sowmiya Sundara Raj (IND)	D_{3}	D_{0}	D_{0}	D_{2}	D_{0}	D_{1}		0	6	0.000	6	30	–24	7	60

=== Pool 6 ===
#	Seed	Athlete	1	2	3	4	5	6	7	V#	M#	Ind.	TG	TR	Diff.	RP	RT
1	6	Margaux Rifkiss (FRA)		D_{2}	V	V	V	V	D_{3}	4	6	0.667	25	22	3	3	22
2	13	Tamara Pochekutova (KAZ)	V		D_{4}	V	D_{3}	V	V	4	6	0.667	27	22	5	2	20
3	24	Martyna Komisarczyk (POL)	D_{4}	V		V	V	V	V	5	6	0.833	29	15	14	1	6
4	31	Patsara Manunya (THA)	D_{1}	D_{2}	D_{1}		V	V	V	3	6	0.500	19	22	–3	5	36
5	42	Maia Chamberlain (USA)	D_{3}	V	D_{2}	D_{2}		V	V	3	6	0.500	22	18	4	4	28
6	49	Kin Escamilla (MEX)	D_{4}	D_{4}	D_{2}	D_{3}	D_{0}		V	1	6	0.167	18	26	–8	6	50
7	60	Antonella Pantanali (ARG)	V	D_{4}	D_{1}	D_{2}	D_{0}	D_{1}		1	6	0.167	13	28	–15	7	53

=== Pool 7 ===
#	Seed	Athlete	1	2	3	4	5	6	7	V#	M#	Ind.	TG	TR	Diff.	RP	RT
1	7	C. A. Bhavani Devi (IND)		D_{0}	D_{2}	V	V	D_{4}	V	3	6	0.500	21	19	2	4	32
2	12	Caroline Quéroli (FRA)	V		V	V	D_{4}	V	D_{0}	4	6	0.667	24	19	5	3	21
3	25	Palina Kaspiarovich (BLR)	V	D_{4}		V	V	D_{2}	V	4	6	0.667	26	17	9	2	18
4	30	Aibike Khabibullina (KAZ)	D_{1}	D_{3}	D_{1}		D_{2}	D_{3}	D_{2}	0	6	0.000	12	30	–18	7	57
5	43	Ayaka Mukae (JPN)	D_{3}	V	D_{1}	V		D_{4}	V	3	6	0.500	23	22	1	5	33
6	48	Violet Michel (USA)	V	D_{2}	V	V	V		V	5	6	0.833	27	22	5	1	16
7	61	Wu Yi-chin (TPE)	D_{0}	V	D_{3}	V	D_{1}	D_{4}		2	6	0.333	18	22	–4	6	42

=== Pool 8 ===
#	Seed	Athlete	1	2	3	4	5	6	V#	M#	Ind.	TG	TR	Diff.	RP	RT
1	8	Hwang Seon-a (KOR)		D_{4}	V	D_{3}	V	V	3	5	0.600	22	17	5	2	23
2	11	Anastasia Bazhenova (RUS)	V		V	D_{2}	V	D_{4}	3	5	0.600	21	21	0	3	26
3	26	Au Sin Ying (HKG)	D_{4}	D_{4}		D_{1}	V	V	2	5	0.400	19	21	–2	4	37
4	27	Chiara Mormile (ITA)	V	V	V		V	V	5	5	1.000	25	10	15	1	3
5	45	Hanna Ivanishchanka (BLR)	D_{2}	D_{3}	D_{3}	D_{3}		D_{4}	0	5	0.000	15	25	–10	6	56
6	47	Parimah Barzegar (IRI)	D_{1}	V	D_{3}	D_{1}	V		2	5	0.400	15	23	–8	5	39

=== Pool 9 ===
#	Seed	Athlete	1	2	3	4	5	6	V#	M#	Ind.	TG	TR	Diff.	RP	RT
1	9	Marta Puda (POL)		D_{2}	D_{2}	V	V	V	3	5	0.600	19	15	4	3	25
2	10	Sofia Ciaraglia (ITA)	V		V	V	V	V	5	5	1.000	25	9	16	1	2
3	28	Julia Mikulik (HUN)	V	D_{3}		V	V	D_{3}	3	5	0.600	21	16	5	2	24
4	29	Choi Shin-hui (KOR)	D_{3}	D_{0}	D_{3}		D_{2}	V	1	5	0.200	13	20	–7	5	48
5	44	Svetlana Sheveleva (RUS)	D_{2}	D_{2}	D_{1}	V		V	2	5	0.400	15	21	–6	4	38
6	46	Ye Yi-shan (TPE)	D_{0}	D_{2}	V	D_{0}	D_{4}		1	5	0.200	11	23	–12	6	49

== Ranking Round ==
=== Section 1 ===
Round of 64
43	Ayaka Mukae (JPN)	11
7	C. A. Bhavani Devi (IND)	15
36	Leanne Singleton-Comfort (USA)	14
28	Julia Mikulik (HUN)	15
9	Marta Puda (POL)	13
15	Caterina Navarria (ITA)	15

Round of 32
20	Darya Andreyeva (BLR)	15
7	C. A. Bhavani Devi (IND)	9
1	Anna Márton (HUN)	15
48	Violet Michel (USA)	2
17	Iryna Shchukla (TUR)	15
28	Julia Mikulik (HUN)	9
15	Caterina Navarria (ITA)	10
33	Risa Takashima (JPN)	15

Round of 16
20	Darya Andreyeva (BLR)	11
1	Anna Márton (HUN)	15
17	Iryna Shchukla (TUR)	8
33	Risa Takashima (JPN)	15

Quarterfinal
1	Anna Márton (HUN)	15
33	Risa Takashima (JPN)	6

=== Section 2 ===
Round of 64
26	Au Sin Ying (HKG)	13
42	Maia Chamberlain (USA)	15
12	Caroline Quéroli (FRA)	15
52	Alisa Utlik (BLR)	7
40	Katarzyna Kędziora (POL)	15
31	Patsara Manunya (THA)	10

Round of 32
32	Olga Nikitina (RUS)	15
42	Maia Chamberlain (USA)	13
12	Caroline Quéroli (FRA)	11
4	Shihomi Fukushima (JPN)	15
23	Margaux Gimalac (FRA)	15
13	Tamara Pochekutova (KAZ)	10
40	Katarzyna Kędziora (POL)	11
2	Misaki Emura (JPN)	15

Round of 16
32	Olga Nikitina (RUS)	15
4	Shihomi Fukushima (JPN)	8
23	Margaux Gimalac (FRA)	6
2	Misaki Emura (JPN)	15

Quarterfinal
32	Olga Nikitina (RUS)	10
2	Misaki Emura (JPN)	15

=== Section 3 ===
Round of 64
21	Sage Palmedo (USA)	8
35	Angelika Wator (POL)	15
50	Karina Trois (BRA)	9
6	Margaux Rifkiss (FRA)	15
5	Yoon Ji-su (KOR)	15
44	Svetlana Sheveleva (RUS)	13

Round of 32
27	Chiara Mormile (ITA)	15
35	Angelika Wator (POL)	11
19	Petra Zahonyi (HUN)	8
59	Park Da-eun (KOR)	15
14	Charleine Taillandier (FRA)	7
6	Margaux Rifkiss (FRA)	15
5	Yoon Ji-su (KOR)	14
24	Martyna Komisarczyk (POL)	15

Round of 16
27	Chiara Mormile (ITA)	15
59	Park Da-eun (KOR)	8
6	Margaux Rifkiss (FRA)	15
24	Martyna Komisarczyk (POL)	11

Quarterfinal
27	Chiara Mormile (ITA)	15
6	Margaux Rifkiss (FRA)	11

=== Section 4 ===
Round of 64
47	Parimah Barzegar (IRI)	10
11	Anastasia Bazhenova (RUS)	15
8	Hwang Seon-a (KOR)	15
61	Wu Yi-chin (TPE)	6
3	Anna Limbach (GER)	15
37	Pang Hui-yi (TPE)	9

Round of 32
39	Najmeh Sazanjian (IRI)	14
11	Anastasia Bazhenova (RUS)	15
8	Hwang Seon-a (KOR)	15
22	Rebecca Gargano (ITA)	10
18	Yana Obvintseva (RUS)	15
25	Palina Kaspiarovich (BLR)	9
3	Anna Limbach (GER)	14
10	Sofia Ciaraglia (ITA)	15

Round of 16
11	Anastasia Bazhenova (RUS)	6
8	Hwang Seon-a (KOR)	15
18	Yana Obvintseva (RUS)	11
10	Sofia Ciaraglia (ITA)	15

Quarterfinal
8	Hwang Seon-a (KOR)	15
10	Sofia Ciaraglia (ITA)	5

=== Quarterfinal ===
Quarterfinals
1	Anna Márton (HUN)	15
33	Risa Takashima (JPN)	6
32	Olga Nikitina (RUS)	10
2	Misaki Emura (JPN)	15
27	Chiara Mormile (ITA)	15
6	Margaux Rifkiss (FRA)	11
8	Hwang Seon-a (KOR)	15
10	Sofia Ciaraglia (ITA)	5

Semifinals
1	Anna Márton (HUN)	15
2	Misaki Emura (JPN)	8
27	Chiara Mormile (ITA)	13
8	Hwang Seon-a (KOR)	15

Final
1	Anna Márton (HUN)	15
8	Hwang Seon-a (KOR)	12

== Final ranking ==
Rank	Athlete	Results
1st place, gold medalist(s)	Anna Márton (HUN)	Champion
2nd place, silver medalist(s)	Hwang Seon-a (KOR)	Runner-up
3rd place, bronze medalist(s)	Chiara Mormile (ITA)	Semifinals
3rd place, bronze medalist(s)	Misaki Emura (JPN)	Semifinals
5	Sofia Ciaraglia (ITA)	Quarterfinals
6	Olga Nikitina (RUS)	Quarterfinals
7	Risa Takashima (JPN)	Quarterfinals
8	Margaux Rifkiss (FRA)	Quarterfinals
9	Darya Andreyeva (BLR)	Round of 16
10	Martyna Komisarczyk (POL)	Round of 16
11	Iryna Shchukla (TUR)	Round of 16
12	Shihomi Fukushima (JPN)	Round of 16
13	Margaux Gimalac (FRA)	Round of 16
14	Park Da-eun (KOR)	Round of 16
15	Yana Obvintseva (RUS)	Round of 16
16	Anastasia Bazhenova (RUS)	Round of 16
17	Najmeh Sazanjian (IRI)	Round of 32
18	Rebecca Gargano (ITA)	Round of 32
19	Charleine Taillandier (FRA)	Round of 32
20	Violet Michel (USA)	Round of 32
21	Palina Kaspiarovich (BLR)	Round of 32
22	Petra Zahonyi (HUN)	Round of 32
23	Tamara Pochekutova (KAZ)	Round of 32
24	Caroline Quéroli (FRA)	Round of 32
25	Julia Mikulik (HUN)	Round of 32
26	Yoon Ji-su (KOR)	Round of 32
27	Maia Chamberlain (USA)	Round of 32
28	Katarzyna Kędziora (POL)	Round of 32
29	Angelika Wator (POL)	Round of 32
30	Anna Limbach (GER)	Round of 32
31	C. A. Bhavani Devi (IND)	Round of 32
32	Caterina Navarria (ITA)	Round of 32
33	Marta Puda (POL)	Round of 64
34	Ayaka Mukae (JPN)	Round of 64
35	Pang Hui-yi (TPE)	Round of 64
36	Sage Palmedo (USA)	Round of 64
37	Patsara Manunya (THA)	Round of 64
38	Au Sin Ying (HKG)	Round of 64
39	Svetlana Sheveleva (RUS)	Round of 64
40	Parimah Barzegar (IRI)	Round of 64
41	Leanne Singleton-Comfort (USA)	Round of 64
42	Wu Yi-chin (TPE)	Round of 64
43	Karina Trois (BRA)	Round of 64
44	Alisa Utlik (BLR)	Round of 64
45	Kiana Bagherzadeh (IRI)	Round of Pools
46	Renata Katona (HUN)	Round of Pools
47	Wu Ya-shiuan (TPE)	Round of Pools
48	Choi Shin-hui (KOR)	Round of Pools
49	Ye Yi-shan (TPE)	Round of Pools
50	Kin Escamilla (MEX)	Round of Pools
51	Yin Panpan (CHN)	Round of Pools
52	Bandhita Srinualad (THA)	Round of Pools
53	Antonella Pantanali (ARG)	Round of Pools
54	Onwipha Innurak (THA)	Round of Pools
55	Aigerim Sarybay (KAZ)	Round of Pools
56	Hanna Ivanishchanka (BLR)	Round of Pools
57	Aibike Khabibullina (KAZ)	Round of Pools
58	Josna Christy Jose (IND)	Round of Pools
59	Anamarija Šušteršič (SLO)	Round of Pools
60	Sowmiya Sundara Raj (IND)	Round of Pools
61	Shivani Shivani (IND)	Round of Pools
