= Women's sabre at the 2017 World Fencing Championships =

- Venue: Arena Leipzig
- Location: Leipzig, Germany
- Dates: 22 July

Medalists
gold medal	Olha Kharlan	Ukraine
silver medal	Azza Besbes	Tunisia
bronze medal	Irene Vecchi	Italy
bronze medal	Cécilia Berder	France

The Women's sabre event of the 2017 World Fencing Championships was held on 22 July 2017. The qualification was held on 20 July 2017.

== Draw ==
=== Finals ===
Semi-finals
(Tunisia) Azza Besbes	15
(Italy) Irene Vecchi	14
(France) Cécilia Berder	10
(Ukraine) Olha Kharlan	15

Final
(Tunisia) Azza Besbes	5
(Ukraine) Olha Kharlan	15

=== Top half ===
==== Section 1 ====
Round of 64
1	(Hungary) Márton	15
64	(Hungary) Garam	10
33	(Mexico) González	4
32	(Japan) Fukushima	15
17	(United States) Muhammad	12
48	(Germany) Kindler	15
49	(Mexico) Pliego	9
16	(Poland) Kozaczuk	15
9	(Tunisia) Besbes	15
56	(United Kingdom) Eifler	11
41	(Ukraine) Bakastova	15
24	(Belarus) Kaspiarovich	14
25	(Spain) Vila	12
40	(South Korea) Yoon	15
57	(Argentina) Pérez	11
8	(Italy) Gulotta	15

Round of 32
1	(Hungary) Márton	8
32	(Japan) Fukushima	15
48	(Germany) Kindler	15
16	(Poland) Kozaczuk	14
9	(Tunisia) Besbes	15
41	(Ukraine) Bakastova	13
40	(South Korea) Yoon	15
8	(Italy) Gulotta	14

Round of 16
32	(Japan) Fukushima	15
48	(Germany) Kindler	12
9	(Tunisia) Besbes	15
40	(South Korea) Yoon	14

Quarterfinals
32	(Japan) Fukushima	9
9	(Tunisia) Besbes	15

==== Section 2 ====
Round of 64
5	(France) Lembach	15
60	(Mexico) Botello	11
37	(Venezuela) Rodríguez	8
28	(France) Balzer	15
21	(Greece) Gkountoura	10
44	(Russia) Bolshakova	15
53	(United Kingdom) Itzkowitz	8
12	(Italy) Vecchi	15
13	(Japan) Aoki	14
52	(Hong Kong) Chang	15
45	(Kazakhstan) Pochekutova	12
20	(Germany) Limbach	15
29	(Hungary) Pusztai	15
36	(Azerbaijan) Bunyatova	11
61	(Turkey) Schukla	7
4	(France) Brunet	15

Round of 32
5	(France) Lembach	14
28	(France) Balzer	15
44	(Russia) Bolshakova	6
12	(Italy) Vecchi	15
52	(Hong Kong) Chang	11
20	(Germany) Limbach	15
29	(Hungary) Pusztai	12
4	(France) Brunet	15

Round of 16
28	(France) Balzer
12	(Italy) Vecchi	w/o
20	(Germany) Limbach	15
4	(France) Brunet	10

Quarterfinals
12	(Italy) Vecchi	15
20	(Germany) Limbach	11

=== Bottom half ===
==== Section 3 ====
Round of 64
3	(South Korea) Kim	15
62	(Spain) Pérez	14
35	(United States) Stone	14
30	(Japan) Emura	15
19	(United States) Wozniak	15
46	(China) Jia	9
51	(Russia) Pozdniakova	15
14	(Romania) Pascu	6
11	(Italy) Criscio	15
54	(China) Fu	7
43	(Venezuela) Benítez	15
22	(Mexico) Toledo	7
27	(China) Yang	8
38	(South Korea) Hwang	15
59	(India) Chadalavada	14
6	(France) Berder	15

Round of 32
3	(South Korea) Kim	8
30	(Japan) Emura	15
19	(United States) Wozniak	14
51	(Russia) Pozdniakova	15
11	(Italy) Criscio	14
43	(Venezuela) Benítez	15
38	(South Korea) Hwang	11
6	(France) Berder	15

Round of 16
30	(Japan) Emura	15
51	(Russia) Pozdniakova	12
43	(Venezuela) Benítez	14
6	(France) Berder	15

Quarterfinals
30	(Japan) Emura	10
6	(France) Berder	15

==== Section 4 ====
Round of 64
7	(Italy) Gregorio	15
58	(Poland) Komisarczyk	11
39	(Belarus) Andreyeva	10
26	(Poland) Puda	15
23	(Russia) Bashta	10
42	(Poland) Jóźwiak	15
55	(Ukraine) Zhovnir	7
10	(Ukraine) Kharlan	15
15	(South Korea) Seo	12
50	(Japan) Tamura	15
47	(Hong Kong) Chan	9
18	(United States) Aksamit	15
31	(Spain) Martín-Portugues	15
34	(Ukraine) Prokuda	7
63	(Canada) Thurgood	5
2	(Russia) Egorian	15

Round of 32
7	(Italy) Gregorio	15
26	(Poland) Puda	9
42	(Poland) Jóźwiak	9
10	(Ukraine) Kharlan	15
50	(Japan) Tamura	15
18	(United States) Aksamit	11
31	(Spain) Martín-Portugues	15
2	(Russia) Egorian	13

Round of 16
7	(Italy) Gregorio	12
10	(Ukraine) Kharlan	15
50	(Japan) Tamura	15
31	(Spain) Martín-Portugues	13

Quarterfinals
10	(Ukraine) Kharlan	15
50	(Japan) Tamura	9
