= Fencing at the 2020 Summer Olympics – Women's team sabre =

Fencing at the Olympics

Women's team sabre at the Games of the XXXII Olympiad
- Olympic fencing
- Venue: Makuhari Messe
- Date: 31 July 2021
- Competitors: 35 from 9 nations

Medalists
1st place, gold medalist(s)		Olga Nikitina; Sofia Pozdniakova; Sofya Velikaya	ROC
2nd place, silver medalist(s)		Sara Balzer; Cécilia Berder; Manon Brunet; Charlotte Lembach	France
3rd place, bronze medalist(s)		Choi Soo-yeon; Kim Ji-yeon; Seo Ji-yeon; Yoon Ji-su	South Korea

The women's team sabre event at the 2020 Summer Olympics took place on 31 July 2021 at the Makuhari Messe. 27 fencers (9 teams of 3) from 9 nations are expected to compete.

== Background ==
This will be the 3rd appearance of the event. It was introduced in 2008, at which point the team events began to be rotated off the schedule, with only two of the three weapons for each of the men's and women's categories. The women's team sabre rotated off in 2012 and back on in 2016. The 2020 Games ended the rotation system, with all weapons having team events.

The reigning Olympic champion is Russia (Yekaterina Dyachenko, Yuliya Gavrilova, Yana Egorian, and Sofya Velikaya). Russia is also the reigning World Champion (Egorian, Olga Nikitina, Sofia Pozdniakova, and Velikaya). A preview from Olympics.com identified Russia as a recently powerful contender, joining historically strong nations Italy, France, and Hungary.

== Qualification ==
A National Olympic Committee (NOC) could enter a team of 3 fencers in the women's team sabre. These fencers also automatically qualified for the individual event.

There are 8 dedicated quota spots for women's team sabre. They are allocated as through the world team ranking list of 5 April 2021. The top 4 spots, regardless of geographic zone, qualify (ROC, Italy, France, and South Korea). The next four spots are allocated to separate geographic zones, as long as an NOC from that zone is in the top 16. These places went to China (Asia/Oceania), the United States (Americas), Tunisia (Africa), and Hungary (Europe).

Additionally, there are 8 host/invitational spots that can be spread throughout the various fencing events. Japan qualified one women's sabre fencer through normal individual qualification and used two host quota places to complete a women's sabre team.

The COVID-19 pandemic delayed many of the events for qualifying for fencing, moving the close of the rankings period back to April 5, 2021 rather than the original April 4, 2020.

== Competition format ==
The 2020 tournament is a single-elimination tournament, with classification matches for all places. Each match features the three fencers on each team competing in a round-robin, with 9 three-minute bouts to 5 points; the winning team is the one that reaches 45 total points first or is leading after the end of the nine bouts. Standard sabre rules regarding target area, striking, and priority are used.

== Schedule ==
The competition is held over a single day, Saturday, 31 July. The first session runs from 10 a.m. to approximately 3:20 p.m. (when all matches except the bronze and gold medal finals are expected to conclude), after which there is a break until 6:30 p.m. before the medal bouts are held.

All times are Japan Standard Time (UTC+9)

Date	Time	Round
Saturday, 31 July 2021	10:00 18:30	Round of 16; Quarterfinals; Semifinals; Classification 7/8; Classification 5/6; Bronze medal match Gold medal match

== Results ==
Round of 16
Tunisia	29
Japan	45

Quarter-finals
ROC	45
Japan	34
Hungary	40
South Korea	45
France	45
United States	30
China	41
Italy	45

Semi-finals
ROC	45
South Korea	26
France	45
Italy	39

Final
ROC	45
France	41
Bronze medal bout
South Korea	45
Italy	42

5–8th place classification

5–8th place semifinals
Japan	45
Hungary	42
United States	45
China	35

Fifth place bout
Japan	45
United States	43
Seventh place bout
Hungary	30
China	45

== Final classification ==
Rank	Team	Athlete
1st place, gold medalist(s)	ROC	Olga Nikitina; Sofia Pozdniakova; Sofya Velikaya
2nd place, silver medalist(s)	France	Sara Balzer; Cécilia Berder; Manon Brunet; Charlotte Lembach
3rd place, bronze medalist(s)	South Korea	Choi Soo-yeon; Kim Ji-yeon; Seo Ji-yeon; Yoon Ji-su
4	Italy	Michela Battiston; Martina Criscio; Rossella Gregorio; Irene Vecchi
5	Japan	Chika Aoki; Misaki Emura; Shihomi Fukushima; Noriko Tamura
6	United States	Francesca Russo; Anne-Elizabeth Stone; Dagmara Wozniak; Mariel Zagunis
7	China	Guo Yiqi; Qian Jiarui; Shao Yaqi; Yang Hengyu
8	Hungary	Sugár Katinka Battai; Renáta Katona; Anna Márton; Liza Pusztai
9	Tunisia	Nadia Ben Azizi; Amira Ben Chaabane; Yasmine Daghfous; Olfa Hezami
