= Fencing at the 2017 Summer Universiade – Women's team sabre =

Women's team sabre at the XXIX Summer Universiade
- Venues: Taipei Nangang Exhibition Center
- Dates: 25 August 2017
- Competitors: 53 from 14 nations

Medalists
1st place, gold medalist(s)		Misaki Emura; Risa Takashima; Shihomi Fukushima; Ayaka Mukae	Japan
2nd place, silver medalist(s)		Anna Márton; Petra Zahonyi; Julia Mikulik; Renata Katona	Hungary
3rd place, bronze medalist(s)		Margaux Gimalac; Margaux Rifkiss; Charleine Taillandier; Caroline Quéroli	France

The women's team sabre fencing event at the 2017 Summer Universiade was held 25 August at the Taipei Nangang Exhibition Center in Taipei, Taiwan.

== Seeds ==
Since the number of individual épée event participants were 61, 62 was the added number on those who did not participate in the individual event.

Tournament Seeding	Team	Name	RI
1 (22)	Japan	Misaki Emura	3
1 (22)	Japan	Risa Takashima	7
1 (22)	Japan	Shihomi Fukushima	12
1 (22)	Japan	Ayaka Mukae	34
2 (26)	Italy	Chiara Mormile	3
2 (26)	Italy	Sofia Ciaraglia	5
2 (26)	Italy	Rebecca Gargano	18
2 (26)	Italy	Caterina Navarria	32
3 (37)	Russia	Olga Nikitina	6
3 (37)	Russia	Yana Obvintseva	15
3 (37)	Russia	Anastasia Bazhenova	16
3 (37)	Russia	Svetlana Sheveleva	39
4 (40)	France	Margaux Rifkiss	8
4 (40)	France	Margaux Gimalac	13
4 (40)	France	Charleine Taillandier	19
4 (40)	France	Caroline Quéroli	24
5 (42)	South Korea	Hwang Seon-a	2
5 (42)	South Korea	Park Da-eun	14
5 (42)	South Korea	Yoon Ji-su	26
5 (42)	South Korea	Choi Shin-hui	48
6 (48)	Hungary	Anna Márton	1
6 (48)	Hungary	Petra Zahonyi	22
6 (48)	Hungary	Julia Mikulik	25
6 (48)	Hungary	Renata Katona	46
7 (67)	Poland	Martyna Komisarczyk	10
7 (67)	Poland	Katarzyna Kędziora	28
7 (67)	Poland	Angelika Wator	29
7 (67)	Poland	Marta Puda	33
8 (74)	Belarus	Darya Andreyeva	9
8 (74)	Belarus	Palina Kaspiarovich	21
8 (74)	Belarus	Alisa Utlik	44
8 (74)	Belarus	Hanna Ivanishchanka	56
9 (83)	United States	Violet Michel	20
9 (83)	United States	Maia Chamberlain	27
9 (83)	United States	Sage Palmedo	36
9 (83)	United States	Leanne Singleton-Comfort	41
10 (102)	Iran	Najmeh Sazanjian	17
10 (102)	Iran	Parimah Barzegar	40
10 (102)	Iran	Kiana Bagherzadeh	45
11 (124)	Chinese Taipei	Pang Hui-yi	35
11 (124)	Chinese Taipei	Wu Yi-chin	42
11 (124)	Chinese Taipei	Wu Ya-shiuan	47
11 (124)	Chinese Taipei	Ye Yi-shan	49
12 (135)	Kazakhstan	Tamara Pochekutova	23
12 (135)	Kazakhstan	Aigerim Sarybay	55
12 (135)	Kazakhstan	Aibike Khabibullina	57
13 (143)	Thailand	Patsara Manunya	37
13 (143)	Thailand	Bandhita Srinualad	52
13 (143)	Thailand	Onwipha Innurak	54
14 (149)	India	C. A. Bhavani Devi	31
14 (149)	India	Josna Christy Jose	58
14 (149)	India	Sowmiya Sundara Raj	60
14 (149)	India	Shivani Shivani	61

== Ranking Round ==
Round of 16
9	United States	45
8	Belarus	29
5	South Korea	45
12	Kazakhstan	29
13	Thailand	19
4	France	45
3	Russia	45
14	India	30
11	Chinese Taipei	26
6	Hungary	45
7	Poland	45
10	Iran	44

Quarterfinals
1	Japan	45
9	United States	34
5	South Korea	41
4	France	45
3	Russia	32
6	Hungary	45
7	Poland	45
2	Italy	40

Semifinals
1	Japan	45
4	France	39
6	Hungary	45
7	Poland	36

Final
1	Japan	45
6	Hungary	38
Third place
4	France	45
7	Poland	44

== Final ranking ==
Rank	Team	Results
1st place, gold medalist(s)	Japan	Champion
2nd place, silver medalist(s)	Hungary	Runner-up
3rd place, bronze medalist(s)	France	Third place
4	Poland	Semifinals
5	Italy	Quarterfinals
6	South Korea	Quarterfinals
7	Russia	Quarterfinals
8	United States	Quarterfinals
9	Belarus	Round of 16
10	Iran	Round of 16
11	Kazakhstan	Round of 16
12	India	Round of 16
13	Chinese Taipei	Round of 16
14	Thailand	Round of 16
