= Fencing at the 2018 Asian Games – Women's team sabre =

Women's team sabre at the 2018 Asian Games
- Venue: Jakarta Convention Center
- Date: 22 August 2018
- Competitors: 36 from 9 nations

Medalists
| gold medal | South Korea; Choi Soo-yeon, Hwang Seon-a, Kim Ji-yeon, Yoon Ji-su |
| silver medal | China; Ma Yingjia, Qian Jiarui, Shao Yaqi, Yang Hengyu |
| bronze medal | Kazakhstan; Aibike Khabibullina, Tamara Pochekutova, Tatyana Prikhodko, Aigerim Sarybay |
| bronze medal | Japan; Chika Aoki, Shihomi Fukushima, Risa Takashima, Norika Tamura |

The women's team sabre competition at the 2018 Asian Games in Jakarta was held on 22 August at the Jakarta Convention Center.

== Schedule ==
All times are Western Indonesia Time (UTC+07:00)

| Date | Time | Event |
|---|---|---|
| Wednesday, 22 August 2018 | 09:00 | Round of 16 |
| Wednesday, 22 August 2018 | 10:30 | Quarterfinals |
| Wednesday, 22 August 2018 | 12:00 | Semifinals |
| Wednesday, 22 August 2018 | 18:00 | Gold medal match |

== Seeding ==
The teams were seeded taking into account the results achieved by competitors representing each team in the individual event.

| Rank | Team | Fencer | | Total |
| Rank | Team | 1 | 2 | Total |
|---|---|---|---|---|
| 1 | China (CHN) | 1 | 2 | 3 |
| 2 | Japan (JPN) | 3 | 5 | 8 |
| 3 | South Korea (KOR) | 3 | 6 | 9 |
| 4 | Hong Kong (HKG) | 7 | 14 | 21 |
| 5 | Kazakhstan (KAZ) | 11 | 12 | 23 |
| 6 | Iran (IRI) | 10 | 15 | 25 |
| 7 | Indonesia (INA) | 8 | 18 | 26 |
| 8 | Thailand (THA) | 16 | 17 | 33 |
| 9 | Nepal (NEP) | 20 | 22 | 42 |

== Results ==
Round of 16
9 | Nepal | 10
8 | Thailand | 45

Quarterfinals
1 | China | 45
8 | Thailand | 32
5 | Kazakhstan | 45
4 | Hong Kong | 40
3 | South Korea | 45
6 | Iran | 23
7 | Indonesia | 22
2 | Japan | 45

Semifinals
1 | China | 45
5 | Kazakhstan | 25
3 | South Korea | 45
2 | Japan | 25

Gold medal match
1 | China | 36
3 | South Korea | 45

== Final standing ==
| Rank | Team |
|---|---|
| 1st place, gold medalist(s) | South Korea (KOR); Choi Soo-yeon; Hwang Seon-a; Kim Ji-yeon; Yoon Ji-su |
| 2nd place, silver medalist(s) | China (CHN); Ma Yingjia; Qian Jiarui; Shao Yaqi; Yang Hengyu |
| 3rd place, bronze medalist(s) | Kazakhstan (KAZ); Aibike Khabibullina; Tamara Pochekutova; Tatyana Prikhodko; Aigerim Sarybay |
| 3rd place, bronze medalist(s) | Japan (JPN); Chika Aoki; Shihomi Fukushima; Risa Takashima; Norika Tamura |
| 5 | Hong Kong (HKG); Au Sin Ying; Chan Yin Fei; Karen Chang; Lam Hin Wai |
| 6 | Iran (IRI); Kiana Bagherzadeh; Parimah Barzegar; Faezeh Rafiei; Najmeh Sazanjian |
| 7 | Indonesia (INA); Agustin Dwi Damayanti; Gebhy Novitha; Diah Permatasari; Ima Sapitri |
| 8 | Thailand (THA); Patsara Manunya; Pornsawan Ngernrungruangroj; Tonkhaw Phokaew; Tonpan Pokeaw |
| 9 | Nepal (NEP); Asmita Basnet; Meena Devi Poudel; Kamala Shrestha; Rabina Thapa |
