= Fencing at the 2022 Asian Games – Women's individual sabre =

Women's individual sabre at the 2022 Asian Games
- Venue: Hangzhou Dianzi University Gymnasium
- Date: 26 September 2023
- Competitors: 22 from 12 nations

Medalists
gold medal	Yoon Ji-su	South Korea
silver medal	Shao Yaqi	China
bronze medal	Seri Ozaki	Japan
bronze medal	Zaynab Dayibekova	Uzbekistan

The women's individual sabre competition at the 2022 Asian Games in Hangzhou was held on 26 September 2023 at the Hangzhou Dianzi University Gymnasium.

== Schedule ==
All times are China Standard Time (UTC+08:00)

Date	Time	Event
Tuesday, 26 September 2023	09:00	Round of pools
Tuesday, 26 September 2023	10:00	Table of 32
Tuesday, 26 September 2023	10:35	Table of 16
Tuesday, 26 September 2023	11:30	Quarterfinals
Tuesday, 26 September 2023	18:30	Semifinals
Tuesday, 26 September 2023	20:20	Gold medal bout

== Results ==
=== Round of pools ===
==== Pool 1 ====
Athlete	CHN	JPN	KAZ	PHI	THA
Shao Yaqi (CHN)	—	3–5	5–2	5–2	5–4
Seri Ozaki (JPN)	5–3	—	4–5	5–3	5–2
Aigerim Sarybay (KAZ)	2–5	5–4	—	1–5	5–2
Jylyn Nicanor (PHI)	2–5	3–5	5–1	—	4–5
Tonkhaw Phokaew (THA)	4–5	2–5	2–5	5–4	—

==== Pool 2 ====
Athlete	KOR	JPN	UZB	HKG	KSA
Yoon Ji-su (KOR)	—	5–3	5–4	3–5	5–0
Shihomi Fukushima (JPN)	3–5	—	5–2	5–4	5–1
Paola Pliego (UZB)	4–5	2–5	—	5–1	5–1
Laren Leung (HKG)	5–3	4–5	1–5	—	5–3
Ruba Al-Masri (KSA)	0–5	1–5	1–5	3–5	—

==== Pool 3 ====
Athlete	CHN	KOR	HKG	SGP	THA	BAN
Yang Hengyu (CHN)	—	5–4	5–1	5–4	5–3	5–1
Jeon Eun-hye (KOR)	4–5	—	5–2	1–5	5–4	5–1
Au Sin Ying (HKG)	1–5	2–5	—	3–5	4–5	5–0
Jessica Ong (SGP)	4–5	5–1	5–3	—	5–1	5–0
Bandhita Srinualnad (THA)	3–5	4–5	5–4	1–5	—	5–4
Fatema Mujib (BAN)	1–5	1–5	0–5	0–5	4–5	—

==== Pool 4 ====
Athlete	UZB	IND	KAZ	SGP	BAN	KSA
Zaynab Dayibekova (UZB)	—	1–5	2–5	5–3	5–1	5–2
Bhavani Devi (IND)	5–1	—	5–3	5–2	5–1	5–1
Karina Dospay (KAZ)	5–2	3–5	—	5–4	5–2	5–2
Juliet Heng (SGP)	3–5	2–5	4–5	—	5–0	5–2
Roksana Khatun (BAN)	1–5	1–5	2–5	0–5	—	4–5
Al-Hasna Al-Hammad (KSA)	2–5	1–5	2–5	2–5	5–4	—

==== Summary ====
Rank	Pool	Athlete	W	L	W/M	TD	TF
1	4	Bhavani Devi (IND)	5	0	1.000	+17	25
2	3	Yang Hengyu (CHN)	5	0	1.000	+12	25
3	3	Jessica Ong (SGP)	4	1	0.800	+14	24
4	4	Karina Dospay (KAZ)	4	1	0.800	+8	23
5	1	Seri Ozaki (JPN)	3	1	0.750	+6	19
6	2	Shihomi Fukushima (JPN)	3	1	0.750	+6	18
6	2	Yoon Ji-su (KOR)	3	1	0.750	+6	18
8	1	Shao Yaqi (CHN)	3	1	0.750	+5	18
9	3	Jeon Eun-hye (KOR)	3	2	0.600	+3	20
10	4	Zaynab Dayibekova (UZB)	3	2	0.600	+2	18
11	2	Paola Pliego (UZB)	2	2	0.500	+4	16
12	2	Laren Leung (HKG)	2	2	0.500	–1	15
13	1	Aigerim Sarybay (KAZ)	2	2	0.500	–3	13
14	4	Juliet Heng (SGP)	2	3	0.400	+2	19
15	3	Bandhita Srinualnad (THA)	2	3	0.400	–5	18
16	1	Jylyn Nicanor (PHI)	1	3	0.250	–2	14
17	1	Tonkhaw Phokaew (THA)	1	3	0.250	–6	13
18	3	Au Sin Ying (HKG)	1	4	0.200	–5	15
19	4	Al-Hasna Al-Hammad (KSA)	1	4	0.200	−12	12
20	2	Ruba Al-Masri (KSA)	0	4	0.000	−15	5
21	4	Roksana Khatun (BAN)	0	5	0.000	−17	8
22	3	Fatema Mujib (BAN)	0	5	0.000	−19	6

=== Knockout round ===
==== Final ====
Gold medal bout
8	Shao Yaqi (CHN)	10
6	Yoon Ji-su (KOR)	15

==== Top half ====
Table of 32
17	Tonkhaw Phokaew (THA)	15
16	Jylyn Nicanor (PHI)	7

Table of 16
1	Bhavani Devi (IND)	15
17	Tonkhaw Phokaew (THA)	9
9	Jeon Eun-hye (KOR)	9
8	Shao Yaqi (CHN)	15
5	Seri Ozaki (JPN)	15
12	Laren Leung (HKG)	13
13	Aigerim Sarybay (KAZ)	14
4	Karina Dospay (KAZ)	15

Quarterfinals
1	Bhavani Devi (IND)	7
8	Shao Yaqi (CHN)	15
5	Seri Ozaki (JPN)	15
4	Karina Dospay (KAZ)	13

Semifinals
8	Shao Yaqi (CHN)	15
5	Seri Ozaki (JPN)	10

==== Bottom half ====
Table of 32

Table of 16
3	Jessica Ong (SGP)	5
14	Juliet Heng (SGP)	15
11	Paola Pliego (UZB)	14
6	Yoon Ji-su (KOR)	15
7	Shihomi Fukushima (JPN)	12
10	Zaynab Dayibekova (UZB)	15
15	Bandhita Srinualnad (THA)	10
2	Yang Hengyu (CHN)	15

Quarterfinals
14	Juliet Heng (SGP)	6
6	Yoon Ji-su (KOR)	15
10	Zaynab Dayibekova (UZB)	15
2	Yang Hengyu (CHN)	12

Semifinals
6	Yoon Ji-su (KOR)	15
10	Zaynab Dayibekova (UZB)	14

== Final standing ==
Rank	Athlete
1st place, gold medalist(s)	Yoon Ji-su (KOR)
2nd place, silver medalist(s)	Shao Yaqi (CHN)
3rd place, bronze medalist(s)	Seri Ozaki (JPN)
3rd place, bronze medalist(s)	Zaynab Dayibekova (UZB)
5	Bhavani Devi (IND)
6	Yang Hengyu (CHN)
7	Karina Dospay (KAZ)
8	Juliet Heng (SGP)
9	Jessica Ong (SGP)
10	Shihomi Fukushima (JPN)
11	Jeon Eun-hye (KOR)
12	Paola Pliego (UZB)
13	Laren Leung (HKG)
14	Aigerim Sarybay (KAZ)
15	Bandhita Srinualnad (THA)
16	Tonkhaw Phokaew (THA)
17	Jylyn Nicanor (PHI)
18	Au Sin Ying (HKG)
19	Al-Hasna Al-Hammad (KSA)
20	Ruba Al-Masri (KSA)
21	Roksana Khatun (BAN)
22	Fatema Mujib (BAN)
