= Fencing at the 2022 Asian Games – Women's team sabre =

Women's team sabre at the 2022 Asian Games
- Venue: Hangzhou Dianzi University Gymnasium
- Date: 29 September 2023
- Competitors: 39 from 10 nations

Medalists
gold medal	Uzbekistan; Zaynab Dayibekova, Fernanda Herrera, Gulistan Perdebaeva, Paola Pliego
silver medal	Japan; Misaki Emura, Shihomi Fukushima, Kanae Kobayashi, Seri Ozaki
bronze medal	China; Lin Kesi, Shao Yaqi, Yang Hengyu, Zhang Xinyi
bronze medal	South Korea; Choi Se-bin, Hong Ha-eun, Jeon Eun-hye, Yoon Ji-su

The women's team sabre competition at the 2022 Asian Games in Hangzhou was held on 29 September 2023 at the Hangzhou Dianzi University Gymnasium.

== Schedule ==
All times are China Standard Time (UTC+08:00)

Date	Time	Event
Friday, 29 September 2023	09:00	Table of 16
Friday, 29 September 2023	10:00	Quarterfinals
Friday, 29 September 2023	11:00	Semifinals
Friday, 29 September 2023	18:00	Gold medal match

== Seeding ==
The teams were seeded taking into account the results achieved by competitors representing each team in the individual event.

Rank	Team	Fencer		Total
Rank	Team	1	2	Total
1	China (CHN)	2	6	8
2	South Korea (KOR)	1	11	12
3	Japan (JPN)	3	10	13
4	Uzbekistan (UZB)	3	12	15
5	Singapore (SGP)	8	9	17
6	Kazakhstan (KAZ)	7	14	21
7	Hong Kong (HKG)	13	18	31
8	Thailand (THA)	15	16	31
9	Saudi Arabia (KSA)	19	20	39
10	Bangladesh (BAN)	21	22	43

== Results ==
Table of 16
9	Saudi Arabia	27
8	Thailand	45
7	Hong Kong	45
10	Bangladesh	17

Quarterfinals
1	China	45
8	Thailand	26
5	Singapore	32
4	Uzbekistan	45
3	Japan	45
6	Kazakhstan	20
7	Hong Kong	25
2	South Korea	45

Semifinals
1	China	43
4	Uzbekistan	45
3	Japan	45
2	South Korea	42

Gold medal match
4	Uzbekistan	45
3	Japan	42

== Final standing ==
Rank	Team
1st place, gold medalist(s)	Uzbekistan (UZB); Zaynab Dayibekova; Fernanda Herrera; Gulistan Perdebaeva; Paola Pliego
2nd place, silver medalist(s)	Japan (JPN); Misaki Emura; Shihomi Fukushima; Kanae Kobayashi; Seri Ozaki
3rd place, bronze medalist(s)	China (CHN); Lin Kesi; Shao Yaqi; Yang Hengyu; Zhang Xinyi
3rd place, bronze medalist(s)	South Korea (KOR); Choi Se-bin; Hong Ha-eun; Jeon Eun-hye; Yoon Ji-su
5	Singapore (SGP); Juliet Heng; Jessica Ong; Jolie Lee; Nicole Wee
6	Kazakhstan (KAZ); Karina Dospay; Anastassiya Gulik; Tatyana Prikhodko; Aigerim Sarybay
7	Hong Kong (HKG); Au Sin Ying; Chu Wing Kiu; Laren Leung; Summer Fay Sit
8	Thailand (THA); Onwipha Innurak; Tonkhaw Phokaew; Poonyanuch Pithakduangkamol; Bandhita Srinualnad
9	Saudi Arabia (KSA); Al-Hasna Al-Hammad; Talene Al-Kudmani; Ruba Al-Masri; Danah Al-Qahtani
10	Bangladesh (BAN); Roksana Khatun; Fatema Mujib; Farjana Easmin Nipa
