= Fencing at the 2018 Asian Games – Women's individual sabre =

Women's individual sabre at the 2018 Asian Games
- Venue: Jakarta Convention Center
- Date: 19 August 2018
- Competitors: 22 from 13 nations

Medalists
| gold medal | Qian Jiarui | China |
| silver medal | Shao Yaqi | China |
| bronze medal | Norika Tamura | Japan |
| bronze medal | Kim Ji-yeon | South Korea |

The women's individual sabre competition at the 2018 Asian Games in Jakarta, Indonesia was held on 19 August at the Jakarta Convention Center.

== Schedule ==
All times are Western Indonesia Time (UTC+07:00)

| Date | Time | Event |
|---|---|---|
| Sunday, 19 August 2018 | 09:00 | Preliminaries |
| Sunday, 19 August 2018 | 12:30 | Round of 32 |
| Sunday, 19 August 2018 | 13:55 | Round of 16 |
| Sunday, 19 August 2018 | 15:35 | Quarterfinals |
| Sunday, 19 August 2018 | 18:00 | Semifinals |
| Sunday, 19 August 2018 | 19:40 | Gold medal match |

== Results ==
=== Preliminaries ===
==== Pool A ====
| Athlete | KOR | IRI | KAZ | THA | INA |
|---|---|---|---|---|---|
| Kim Ji-yeon (KOR) | — | 5–4 | 5–3 | 5–2 | 5–3 |
| Najmeh Sazanjian (IRI) | 4–5 | — | 5–2 | 5–1 | 3–5 |
| Tamara Pochekutova (KAZ) | 3–5 | 2–5 | — | 5–3 | 5–1 |
| Tonpan Pokeaw (THA) | 2–5 | 1–5 | 3–5 | — | 5–0 |
| Gebhy Novitha (INA) | 3–5 | 5–3 | 1–5 | 0–5 | — |

==== Pool B ====
| Athlete | CHN | HKG | SGP | KAZ | THA |
|---|---|---|---|---|---|
| Shao Yaqi (CHN) | — | 3–5 | 5–1 | 4–5 | 5–1 |
| Karen Chang (HKG) | 5–3 | — | 5–2 | 0–5 | 5–2 |
| Lau Ywen (SGP) | 1–5 | 2–5 | — | 5–4 | 5–3 |
| Aigerim Sarybay (KAZ) | 5–4 | 5–0 | 4–5 | — | 1–5 |
| Pornsawan Ngernrungruangroj (THA) | 1–5 | 2–5 | 3–5 | 5–1 | — |

==== Pool C ====
| Athlete | CHN | JPN | HKG | VIE | NEP | MGL |
|---|---|---|---|---|---|---|
| Qian Jiarui (CHN) | — | 5–3 | 5–4 | 5–2 | 5–1 | 5–1 |
| Norika Tamura (JPN) | 3–5 | — | 5–3 | 5–2 | 5–0 | 5–1 |
| Au Sin Ying (HKG) | 4–5 | 3–5 | — | 4–5 | 5–0 | 5–1 |
| Bùi Thị Thu Hà (VIE) | 2–5 | 2–5 | 5–4 | — | 5–4 | 5–1 |
| Kamala Shrestha (NEP) | 1–5 | 0–5 | 0–5 | 4–5 | — | 5–0 |
| Yundendorjiin Ariunzayaa (MGL) | 1–5 | 1–5 | 1–5 | 1–5 | 0–5 | — |

==== Pool D ====
| Athlete | JPN | KOR | IRI | INA | CAM | NEP |
|---|---|---|---|---|---|---|
| Shihomi Fukushima (JPN) | — | 5–1 | 5–3 | 5–3 | 5–3 | 5–0 |
| Yoon Ji-su (KOR) | 1–5 | — | 5–1 | 5–3 | 5–0 | 5–0 |
| Faezeh Rafiei (IRI) | 3–5 | 1–5 | — | 3–5 | 5–3 | 5–0 |
| Diah Permatasari (INA) | 3–5 | 3–5 | 5–3 | — | 5–4 | 5–0 |
| Chhay Linly (CAM) | 3–5 | 0–5 | 3–5 | 4–5 | — | 5–1 |
| Rabina Thapa (NEP) | 0–5 | 0–5 | 0–5 | 0–5 | 1–5 | — |

==== Summary ====
| Rank | Pool | Athlete | W | L | W/M | TD | TF |
|---|---|---|---|---|---|---|---|
| 1 | D | Shihomi Fukushima (JPN) | 5 | 0 | 1.000 | +15 | 25 |
| 2 | C | Qian Jiarui (CHN) | 5 | 0 | 1.000 | +14 | 25 |
| 3 | A | Kim Ji-yeon (KOR) | 4 | 0 | 1.000 | +8 | 20 |
| 4 | C | Norika Tamura (JPN) | 4 | 1 | 0.800 | +12 | 23 |
| 5 | D | Yoon Ji-su (KOR) | 4 | 1 | 0.800 | +12 | 21 |
| 6 | B | Karen Chang (HKG) | 3 | 1 | 0.750 | +3 | 15 |
| 7 | D | Diah Permatasari (INA) | 3 | 2 | 0.600 | +4 | 21 |
| 8 | C | Bùi Thị Thu Hà (VIE) | 3 | 2 | 0.600 | 0 | 19 |
| 9 | B | Shao Yaqi (CHN) | 2 | 2 | 0.500 | +5 | 17 |
| 10 | A | Najmeh Sazanjian (IRI) | 2 | 2 | 0.500 | +4 | 17 |
| 11 | A | Tamara Pochekutova (KAZ) | 2 | 2 | 0.500 | +1 | 15 |
| 11 | B | Aigerim Sarybay (KAZ) | 2 | 2 | 0.500 | +1 | 15 |
| 13 | B | Lau Ywen (SGP) | 2 | 2 | 0.500 | −4 | 13 |
| 14 | C | Au Sin Ying (HKG) | 2 | 3 | 0.400 | +5 | 21 |
| 15 | D | Faezeh Rafiei (IRI) | 2 | 3 | 0.400 | −1 | 17 |
| 16 | A | Tonpan Pokeaw (THA) | 1 | 3 | 0.250 | −4 | 11 |
| 17 | B | Pornsawan Ngernrungruangroj (THA) | 1 | 3 | 0.250 | −5 | 11 |
| 18 | A | Gebhy Novitha (INA) | 1 | 3 | 0.250 | −9 | 9 |
| 19 | D | Chhay Linly (CAM) | 1 | 4 | 0.200 | −6 | 15 |
| 20 | C | Kamala Shrestha (NEP) | 1 | 4 | 0.200 | −10 | 10 |
| 21 | C | Yundendorjiin Ariunzayaa (MGL) | 0 | 5 | 0.000 | −21 | 4 |
| 22 | D | Rabina Thapa (NEP) | 0 | 5 | 0.000 | −24 | 1 |

=== Knockout round ===
==== Final ====
| Gold medal match |
| 9 | Shao Yaqi (CHN) | 9 |
| 2 | Qian Jiarui (CHN) | 15 |

==== Top half ====
Round of 32
17 | Pornsawan Ngernrungruangroj (THA) | 10
16 | Tonpan Pokeaw (THA) | 15

Round of 16
1 | Shihomi Fukushima (JPN) | 15
16 | Tonpan Pokeaw (THA) | 3
9 | Shao Yaqi (CHN) | 15
8 | Bùi Thị Thu Hà (VIE) | 14
5 | Yoon Ji-su (KOR) | 15
12 | Aigerim Sarybay (KAZ) | 10
13 | Lau Ywen (SGP) | 7
4 | Norika Tamura (JPN) | 15

Quarterfinals
1 | Shihomi Fukushima (JPN) | 12
9 | Shao Yaqi (CHN) | 15
5 | Yoon Ji-su (KOR) | 13
4 | Norika Tamura (JPN) | 15

Semifinals
9 | Shao Yaqi (CHN) | 15
4 | Norika Tamura (JPN) | 14

==== Bottom half ====
Round of 32

Round of 16
3 | Kim Ji-yeon (KOR) | 15
14 | Au Sin Ying (HKG) | 10
11 | Tamara Pochekutova (KAZ) | 9
6 | Karen Chang (HKG) | 15
7 | Diah Permatasari (INA) | 15
10 | Najmeh Sazanjian (IRI) | 11
15 | Faezeh Rafiei (IRI) | 13
2 | Qian Jiarui (CHN) | 15

Quarterfinals
3 | Kim Ji-yeon (KOR) | 15
6 | Karen Chang (HKG) | 4
7 | Diah Permatasari (INA) | 11
2 | Qian Jiarui (CHN) | 15

Semifinals
3 | Kim Ji-yeon (KOR) | 13
2 | Qian Jiarui (CHN) | 15

== Final standings ==
| Rank | Athlete |
|---|---|
| 1st place, gold medalist(s) | Qian Jiarui (CHN) |
| 2nd place, silver medalist(s) | Shao Yaqi (CHN) |
| 3rd place, bronze medalist(s) | Norika Tamura (JPN) |
| 3rd place, bronze medalist(s) | Kim Ji-yeon (KOR) |
| 5 | Shihomi Fukushima (JPN) |
| 6 | Yoon Ji-su (KOR) |
| 7 | Karen Chang (HKG) |
| 8 | Diah Permatasari (INA) |
| 9 | Bùi Thị Thu Hà (VIE) |
| 10 | Najmeh Sazanjian (IRI) |
| 11 | Tamara Pochekutova (KAZ) |
| 12 | Aigerim Sarybay (KAZ) |
| 13 | Lau Ywen (SGP) |
| 14 | Au Sin Ying (HKG) |
| 15 | Faezeh Rafiei (IRI) |
| 16 | Tonpan Pokeaw (THA) |
| 17 | Pornsawan Ngernrungruangroj (THA) |
| 18 | Gebhy Novitha (INA) |
| 19 | Chhay Linly (CAM) |
| 20 | Kamala Shrestha (NEP) |
| 21 | Yundendorjiin Ariunzayaa (MGL) |
| 22 | Rabina Thapa (NEP) |
