= Women's team sabre at the 2018 World Fencing Championships =

- Venue: Wuxi Sports Center Indoor Stadium
- Location: Wuxi, China
- Dates: 26 July; 27 July
- Competitors: 19 from 76 nations

Medalists
gold medal	Cécilia Berder; Manon Brunet; Charlotte Lembach; Caroline Quéroli	France
silver medal	Yana Egorian; Sofia Pozdniakova; Svetlana Sheveleva; Sofya Velikaya	Russia
bronze medal	Choi Soo-yeon; Hwang Seo-na; Kim Ji-yeon; Yoon Ji-su	South Korea

The Women's team sabre event of the 2018 World Fencing Championships was held on 26 and 27 July 2018.

== Draw ==
=== Finals ===
Semifinals
Italy	44
Russia	45
South Korea	42
France	45

Final
Russia	35
France	45
Third place
Italy	40
South Korea	45

=== Top half ===
==== Section 1 ====
Round of 32

Team 1	Score	Team 2
Thailand	37–45	Azerbaijan

Round of 16
Italy	45
Azerbaijan	34
Hungary	45
Japan	33

Quarterfinals
Italy	45
Hungary	44

==== Section 2 ====
Round of 16
United States	45
Hong Kong	33
Canada	27
Russia	45

Quarterfinals
United States	42
Russia	45

=== Bottom half ===
==== Section 3 ====
Round of 32

Team 1	Score	Team 2
Singapore	37–45	Germany

Round of 16
South Korea	45
Germany	33
Poland	23
Ukraine	45

Quarterfinals
South Korea	45
Ukraine	37

==== Section 4 ====
Round of 32

Team 1	Score	Team 2
Kazakhstan	39–45	Iran

Round of 16
China	45
Spain	44
Iran	31
France	45

Quarterfinals
China	42
France	45

=== Placement rounds ===
==== 5–8th place bracket ====
5–8th place semifinals
Hungary	41
United States	45
Ukraine	45
China	44

Fifth place
United States	45
Ukraine	34
Seventh place
Hungary	45
China	27

==== 9–16th place bracket ====
9–16th place quarterfinals
Azerbaijan	34
Japan	45
Hong Kong	35
Canada	45
Germany	45
Poland	43
Spain	45
Iran	34

9–12th place semifinals
Japan	45
Canada	29
Germany	35
Spain	45

Ninth place
Japan	45
Spain	39
Eleventh place
Canada	36
Germany	45

==== 13–16th place bracket ====
13–16th place semifinals
Azerbaijan	45
Hong Kong	29
Poland	43
Iran	45

13th place
Azerbaijan	45
Iran	36
15th place
Hong Kong	22
Poland	45
