= Fencing at the 2024 Summer Olympics – Women's team sabre =

Women's team sabre at the Games of the XXXIII Olympiad
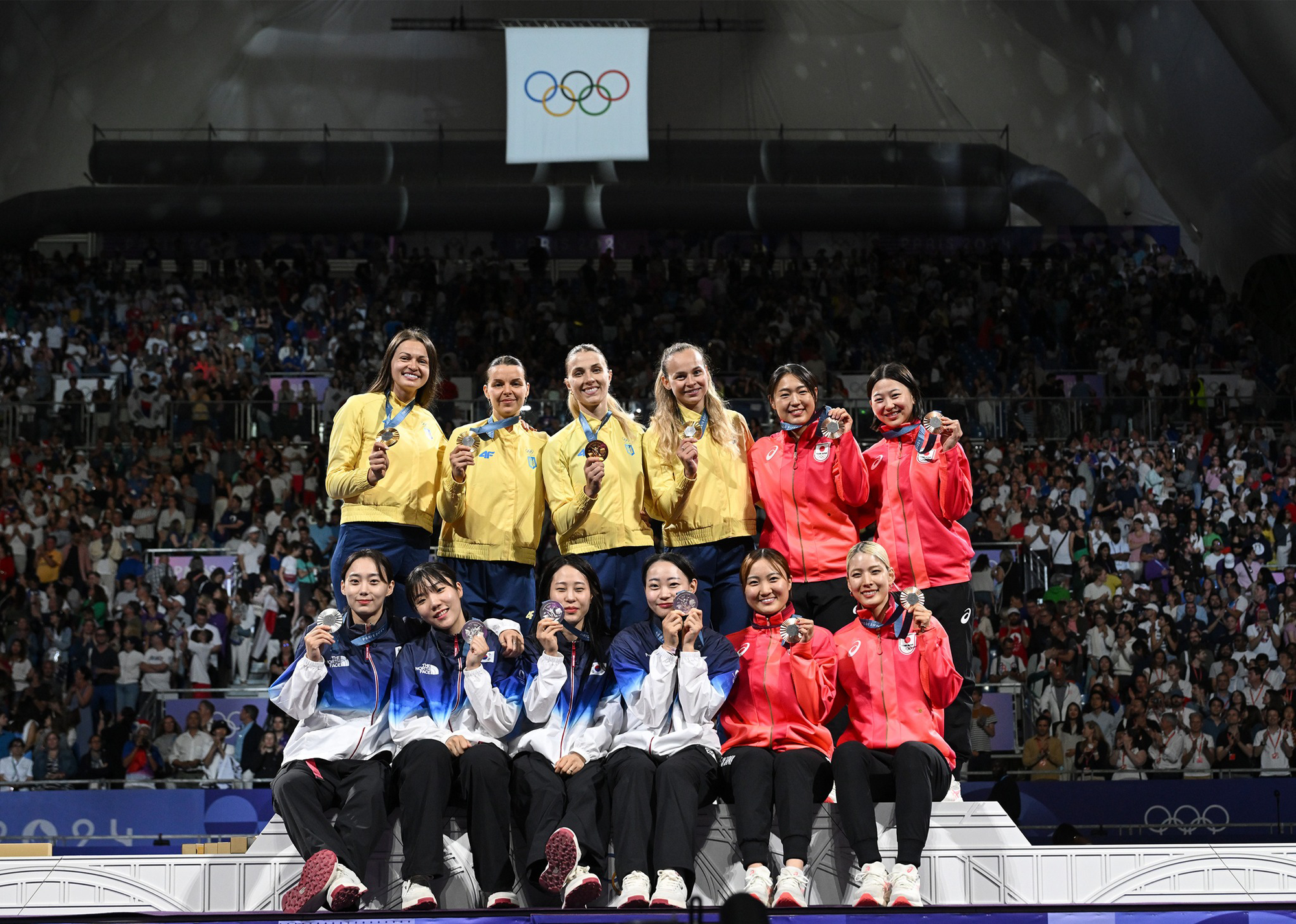
- Venue: Grand Palais strip
- Date: 3 August 2024
- Competitors: 24 from 8 nations
- Teams: 8

Medalists
1st place, gold medalist(s)		Yuliya Bakastova; Alina Komashchuk; Olga Kharlan; Olena Kravatska	Ukraine
2nd place, silver medalist(s)		Choi Se-bin; Jeon Ha-young; Jeon Eun-hye; Yoon Ji-su	South Korea
3rd place, bronze medalist(s)		Risa Takashima; Seri Ozaki; Misaki Emura; Shihomi Fukushima	Japan

The women's team sabre event at the 2024 Summer Olympics took place on 3 August 2024 at the Grand Palais strip. 24 fencers (eight teams of three) from eight nations competed.

== Qualification ==
A National Olympic Committee (NOC) could enter a team of three fencers in the women's team sabre. These fencers also automatically qualified for the individual event.

== Competition format ==
The tournament was a single-elimination tournament, with classification matches for all places. Each match featured the three fencers on each team competing in a round-robin, with nine three-minute bouts to five points; the winning team was the one that reaches 45 total points first or was leading after the end of the nine bouts.

== Schedule ==
The competition was held over a single day.

All times are Central European Summer Time (UTC+2)

Date	Time	Round
Saturday, 3 August 2024	13:50; 16:10; 17:00; 17:00; 19:50; 20:50	Quarterfinals; Semifinals; Classification 7/8; Classification 5/6; Bronze medal match Gold medal match

== Results ==
Quarter-finals
France	45
Algeria	32
United States	35
South Korea	45
Ukraine	45
Italy	37
Japan	45
Hungary	37

Semi-finals
France	36
South Korea	45
Ukraine	45
Japan	32

Final
South Korea	42
Ukraine	45
Bronze medal bout
France	40
Japan	45

5–8th place classification

5–8th place semifinals
Algeria	28
United States	45
Italy	35
Hungary	45

Fifth place bout
United States	45
Hungary	39
Seventh place bout
Algeria	27
Italy	45

== Final classification ==
Rank	Team	Athletes
1st place, gold medalist(s)	Ukraine	Yuliya Bakastova; Alina Komashchuk; Olga Kharlan; Olena Kravatska
2nd place, silver medalist(s)	South Korea	Choi Se-bin; Jeon Ha-young; Jeon Eun-hye; Yoon Ji-su
3rd place, bronze medalist(s)	Japan	Risa Takashima; Seri Ozaki; Misaki Emura; Shihomi Fukushima
4	France	Sarah Noutcha; Sara Balzer; Manon Brunet; Cécilia Berder
5	United States	Elizabeth Tartakovsky; Maia Chamberlain; Magda Skarbonkiewicz; Tatiana Nazlymov
6	Hungary	Luca Szűcs; Anna Márton; Sugár Katinka Battai; Liza Pusztai
7	Italy	Irene Vecchi; Martina Criscio; Michela Battiston; Chiara Mormile
8	Algeria	Kaouther Mohamed Belkebir; Zohra Nora Kehli; Saoussen Boudiaf; Chaima Benadouda
