= 2016 Asian Fencing Championships =

Fencing competition in Wuxi, China

- Host city: Wuxi, China
- Dates: 13–18 April 2016
- Main venue: Wuxi Sports Center

The 2016 Asian Fencing Championships were held in Wuxi, China from 13 to 18 April 2016 at the Wuxi Sports Center.

== Medal summary ==
=== Men ===
Event	Gold	Silver	Bronze
Individual épée	Park Kyoung-doo; South Korea	Park Sang-young; South Korea	Kazuyasu Minobe; Japan
Individual épée	Park Kyoung-doo; South Korea	Park Sang-young; South Korea	Shi Gaofeng; China
Team épée	Japan; Inochi Ito; Kazuyasu Minobe; Satoru Uyama; Masaru Yamada	South Korea; Jung Jin-sun; Jung Seung-hwa; Park Kyoung-doo; Park Sang-young	Kazakhstan; Dmitriy Alexanin; Elmir Alimzhanov; Ivan Deryabin; Ruslan Kurbanov
Team épée	Japan; Inochi Ito; Kazuyasu Minobe; Satoru Uyama; Masaru Yamada	South Korea; Jung Jin-sun; Jung Seung-hwa; Park Kyoung-doo; Park Sang-young	China; Dong Chao; Jiao Yunlong; Li Zhen; Shi Gaofeng
Individual foil	Cheung Ka Long; Hong Kong	Takahiro Shikine; Japan	Kwon Young-ho; South Korea
Individual foil	Cheung Ka Long; Hong Kong	Takahiro Shikine; Japan	Lei Sheng; China
Team foil	South Korea; Heo Jun; Kwon Young-ho; Lee Kwang-hyun; Son Young-ki	China; Chen Haiwei; Lei Sheng; Ma Jianfei; Shi Jialuo	Japan; Kyosuke Matsuyama; Toshiya Saito; Takahiro Shikine; Kenta Suzumura
Team foil	South Korea; Heo Jun; Kwon Young-ho; Lee Kwang-hyun; Son Young-ki	China; Chen Haiwei; Lei Sheng; Ma Jianfei; Shi Jialuo	Hong Kong; Cheung Ka Long; Cheung Siu Lun; Nicholas Choi; Yeung Chi Ka
Individual sabre	Kim Jung-hwan; South Korea	Ali Pakdaman; Iran	Vũ Thành An; Vietnam
Individual sabre	Kim Jung-hwan; South Korea	Ali Pakdaman; Iran	Xu Yingming; China
Team sabre	South Korea; Gu Bon-gil; Kim Jung-hwan; Kim Jun-ho; Oh Sang-uk	China; Fang Xin; Sun Wei; Wang Shi; Xu Yingming	Vietnam; Nguyễn Xuân Lợi; Tô Đức Anh; Vũ Thành An; Vũ Văn Hùng
Team sabre	South Korea; Gu Bon-gil; Kim Jung-hwan; Kim Jun-ho; Oh Sang-uk	China; Fang Xin; Sun Wei; Wang Shi; Xu Yingming	Hong Kong; Cyrus Chang; Aaron Ho; Lam Hin Chung; Low Ho Tin

=== Women ===
Event	Gold	Silver	Bronze
Individual épée	Sun Yujie; China	Xu Anqi; China	Kang Young-mi; South Korea
Individual épée	Sun Yujie; China	Xu Anqi; China	Shin A-lam; South Korea
Team épée	South Korea; Choi Eun-sook; Choi In-jeong; Kang Young-mi; Shin A-lam	China; Hao Jialu; Sun Yiwen; Sun Yujie; Xu Anqi	Hong Kong; Chu Ka Mong; Debbie Ho; Vivian Kong; Coco Lin
Team épée	South Korea; Choi Eun-sook; Choi In-jeong; Kang Young-mi; Shin A-lam	China; Hao Jialu; Sun Yiwen; Sun Yujie; Xu Anqi	Japan; Shiori Komata; Ayumu Saito; Nozomi Sato; Ayaka Shimookawa
Individual foil	Nam Hyun-hee; South Korea	Le Huilin; China	Minami Kano; Japan
Individual foil	Nam Hyun-hee; South Korea	Le Huilin; China	Kim Mi-na; South Korea
Team foil	China; Gong Yu; Le Huilin; Liu Yongshi; Wu Peilin	South Korea; Hong Seo-in; Kim Mi-na; Lim Seung-min; Nam Hyun-hee	Japan; Minami Kano; Karin Miyawaki; Shiho Nishioka; Haruka Yanaoka
Team foil	China; Gong Yu; Le Huilin; Liu Yongshi; Wu Peilin	South Korea; Hong Seo-in; Kim Mi-na; Lim Seung-min; Nam Hyun-hee	Hong Kong; Kimberley Cheung; Lau Cheuk Yu; Lin Po Heung; Liu Yan Wai
Individual sabre	Hwang Seon-a; South Korea	Shao Yaqi; China	Kim Ji-yeon; South Korea
Individual sabre	Hwang Seon-a; South Korea	Shao Yaqi; China	Yoon Ji-su; South Korea
Team sabre	China; Shao Yaqi; Shen Chen; Zhang Xueqian; Zhang Xin	South Korea; Hwang Seon-a; Kim Ji-yeon; Lee Ra-jin; Yoon Ji-su	Japan; Chika Aoki; Misaki Emura; Risa Takashima; Norika Tamura
Team sabre	China; Shao Yaqi; Shen Chen; Zhang Xueqian; Zhang Xin	South Korea; Hwang Seon-a; Kim Ji-yeon; Lee Ra-jin; Yoon Ji-su	Kazakhstan; Aibike Khabibullina; Diana Pamansha; Tamara Pochekutova; Yuliya Savitskaya

== Medal table ==
Rank	Nation	Gold	Silver	Bronze	Total
1	South Korea	7	4	6	17
2	China	3	6	4	13
3	Japan	1	1	6	8
4	Hong Kong	1	0	4	5
5	Iran	0	1	0	1
6	Kazakhstan	0	0	2	2
6	Vietnam	0	0	2	2
Totals (7 entries)		12	12	24	48
