= Zaynab Dayibekova =

Uzbekistani fencer (born 2002)

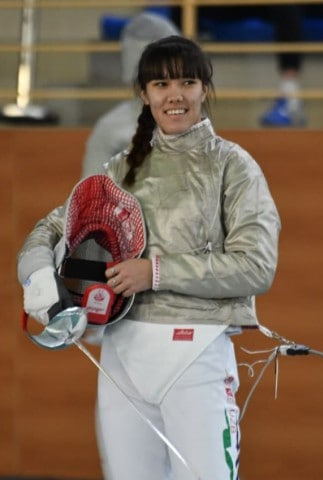

Personal information
- Full name: Dayibekova Zaynab Kazbekovna
- Born: 19 November 2002 (age 23) Nukus, Uzbekistan

Fencing career
- Sport: Fencing
- Country: Uzbekistan
- Weapon: Sabre
- Hand: Right
- Years on national team: 2016–present
- Former coach: Daurbek Jiermuratov
- Highest ranking: 4th (2021–20220)
- FIE ranking: current ranking
Medal record
Women's sabre
Representing Uzbekistan
Asian Games
Gold medal – first place	2022 Hangzhou	Team
Silver medal – second place	2026 Aichi–Nagoya	Individual
Bronze medal – third place	2022 Hangzhou	Individual
Bronze medal – third place	2026 Aichi–Nagoya	Team
Islamic Solidarity Games
Silver medal – second place	2021 Konya	Team
Silver medal – second place	2025 Riyadh	Team
World University Games
Bronze medal – third place	2021 Chengdu	Team
World Juniors Championships
Bronze medal – third place	2022 Dubai	Individual
World Cup
Gold medal – first place	2019 Tashkent	Individual
Gold medal – first place	2021 Tashkent	Individual
Gold medal – first place	2021 Tashkent	Team
Silver medal – second place	2022–23 Fencing World Cup	2021 Algiers
Bronze medal – third place	2023 Chengdu	Team
Asian Championships
Gold medal – first place	2023 Wuxi	Team
Silver medal – second place	2022 Tashkent	Team
Bronze medal – third place	2018 Duabi	Team

Zaynab Kazbekovna Dayibekova (born 19 November 2002) is an Uzbek fencer. She competed in the women's sabre event at the 2020 Summer Olympics in Tokyo, Japan, reaching the quarterfinals.

== Early life and education ==
Dayibekova was born on 19 November 2002, in the Republic of Karakalpakstan, Nukus region. She has been practicing fencing since 2015 and she is left-handed sabre fencer. Her first coach is Daurbek Jiermuratov. She was a student of the Nukus branch of the Uzbekistan State University of Physical Education and Sports.

== Career ==
In 2018, at the Asian Junior Fencing Championship in the UAE, she won a bronze medal. In 2019, at the Junior Women's Sabre World Cup in Tashkent, Uzbekistan, she won a gold medal by defeating Nisonur Erbil of Turkey in the final with a score of 15:12. In 2021, at the Asia-Oceania Fencing Qualification Tournament, Zaynab Dayibekova secured a spot in the Summer Olympic Games in Tokyo, Japan. In the final match for the qualification, she defeated Aigerim Saribay from Kazakhstan with a score of 15:6. On 30 June 2021, in honor of Youth Day, the President of Uzbekistan, Shavkat Mirziyoyev, awarded Zaynab the "Shuhrat" medal. In the same year, she finished seventh at the Junior World Fencing Championship in Cairo, Egypt.

At the XXXII Summer Olympics, Zaynab began her performance with a victory over Japanese fencer Tika Aoki with a score of 15:9. In the second stage, she defeated the Asian silver medalist, Chinese fencer Shao Yaci, with a score of 15:10. In the round of 16, she once again secured a victory, this time over Korean fencer Yun Ji Soo with a score of 15:12. In the quarter-finals, she faced Hungarian fencer Anna Marton, a medalist at world and European championships, but lost with a score of 11:15. In 2021, the President of Uzbekistan, Shavkat Mirziyoyev, awarded Zaynab the "Jasorat" medal for her outstanding contribution to the development of the Olympic movement. In 2023, she won a gold medal at the Asian Senior Fencing Championship in Wuxi, China.

== Medals ==
=== World Junior Championship ===
Year	Location	Event	Position
2022	Dubai, United Arab Emirates	Individual Women's Sabre	3rd

=== World Cup ===
Year	Location	Event	Position
2019	Tashkent, Uzbekistan	Individual Women's Sabre	1st
2020	Algiers, Algeria	Team Women's Sabre	2nd
2021	Tashkent, Uzbekistan	Individual Women's Sabre	1st

=== Asian Championship ===
Year	Location	Event	Position
2018	Dubai, United Arab Emirates	Team Women's Sabre	3rd
2022	Tashkent, Uzbekistan	Team Women's Sabre	2nd
2023	Wuxi, China	Individual Women's Sabre	1st
