= Kaouther Mohamed Belkebir =

Algerian fencer

Kaouther Mohamed Belkebir (born 5 August 2003) is an Algerian fencer. She is ranked 310th internationally, and represented her country at the 2020 Olympics.

== Career ==
She was a bronze medalist at the 2019 African Fencing Championships in Bamako.

In April 2021, she won the African Olympic Qualification Tournament in Cairo, thus qualifying for the Tokyo Olympic Games.

== 2020 Tokyo Summer Olympics ==
Belkebir represented Algeria at the 2020 Tokyo Summer Olympics, losing 15–1 to China's Yang Hengyu at the Women's Sabre Individual event. She ranked 35th.
