= Seri Ozaki =

Japanese fencer (born 2002)

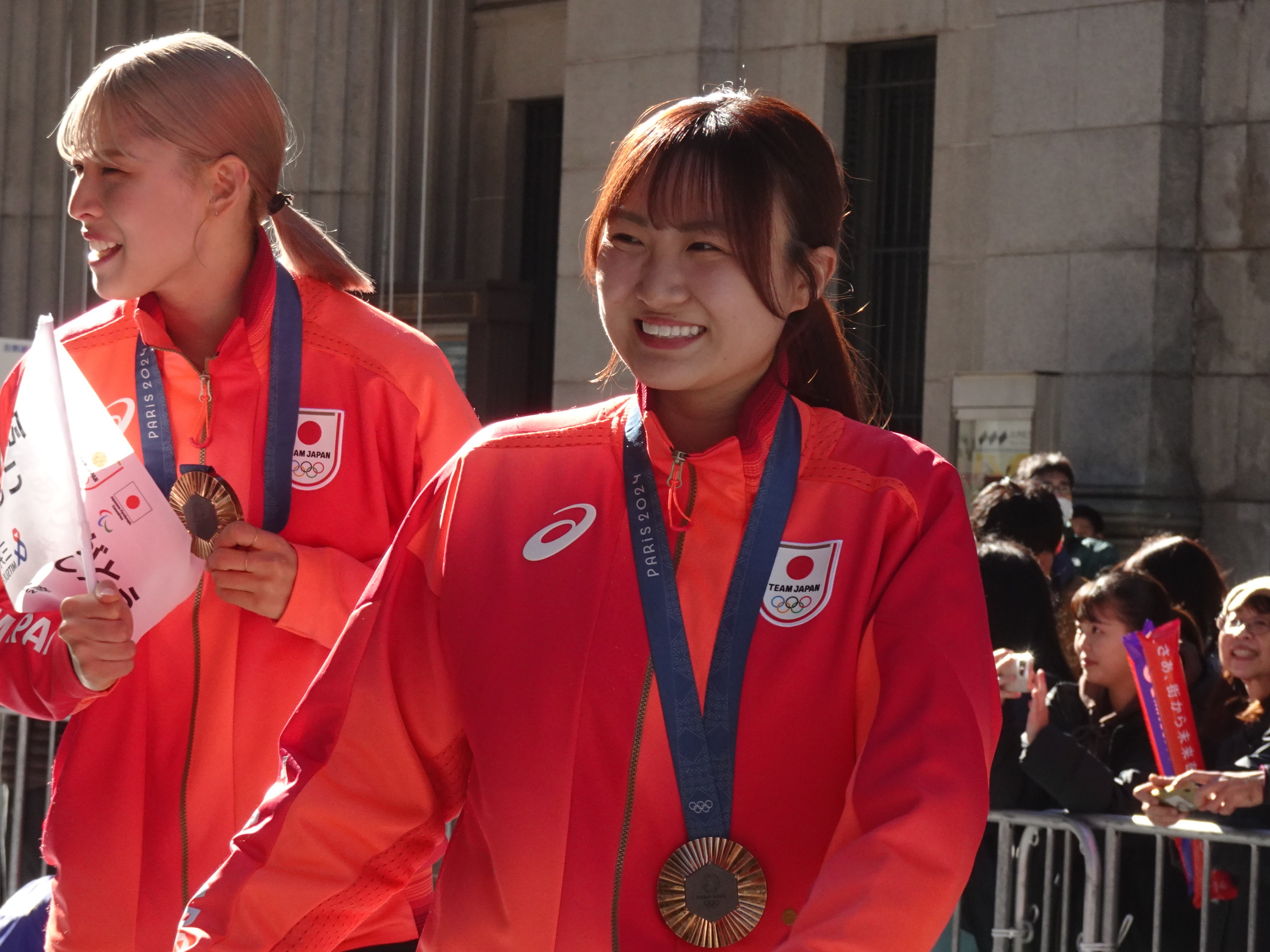
- Ozaki at Paris 2024 Summer Olympians and Paralympians Japan National Team parade event on November 30th, 2024

Personal information
- Native name: 尾﨑世梨
- Born: 22 September 2002 (age 24) Sapporo, Hokkaido, Japan

Fencing career
- Sport: Fencing
- Country: Japan
Medal record
Women's sabre
Representing Japan
Olympic Games
Bronze medal – third place	2024 Paris	Team
World Championships
Bronze medal – third place	2022 Cairo	Team
Asian Games
Bronze medal – third place	2022 Hangzhou	Individual
Silver medal – second place	2022 Hangzhou	Team
Silver medal – second place	2026 Aichi–Nagoya	Team
Asian Championships
Silver medal – second place	2022 Seoul	Team
Bronze medal – third place	2023 Wuxi	Team
Bronze medal – third place	2024 Kuwait City	Individual

Seri Ozaki (born 22 September 2002) is a Japanese fencer. She competed at the 2024 Summer Olympics, winning the bronze medal in the women's team sabre event.
