= Misaki Emura =

Japanese fencer (born 1998)

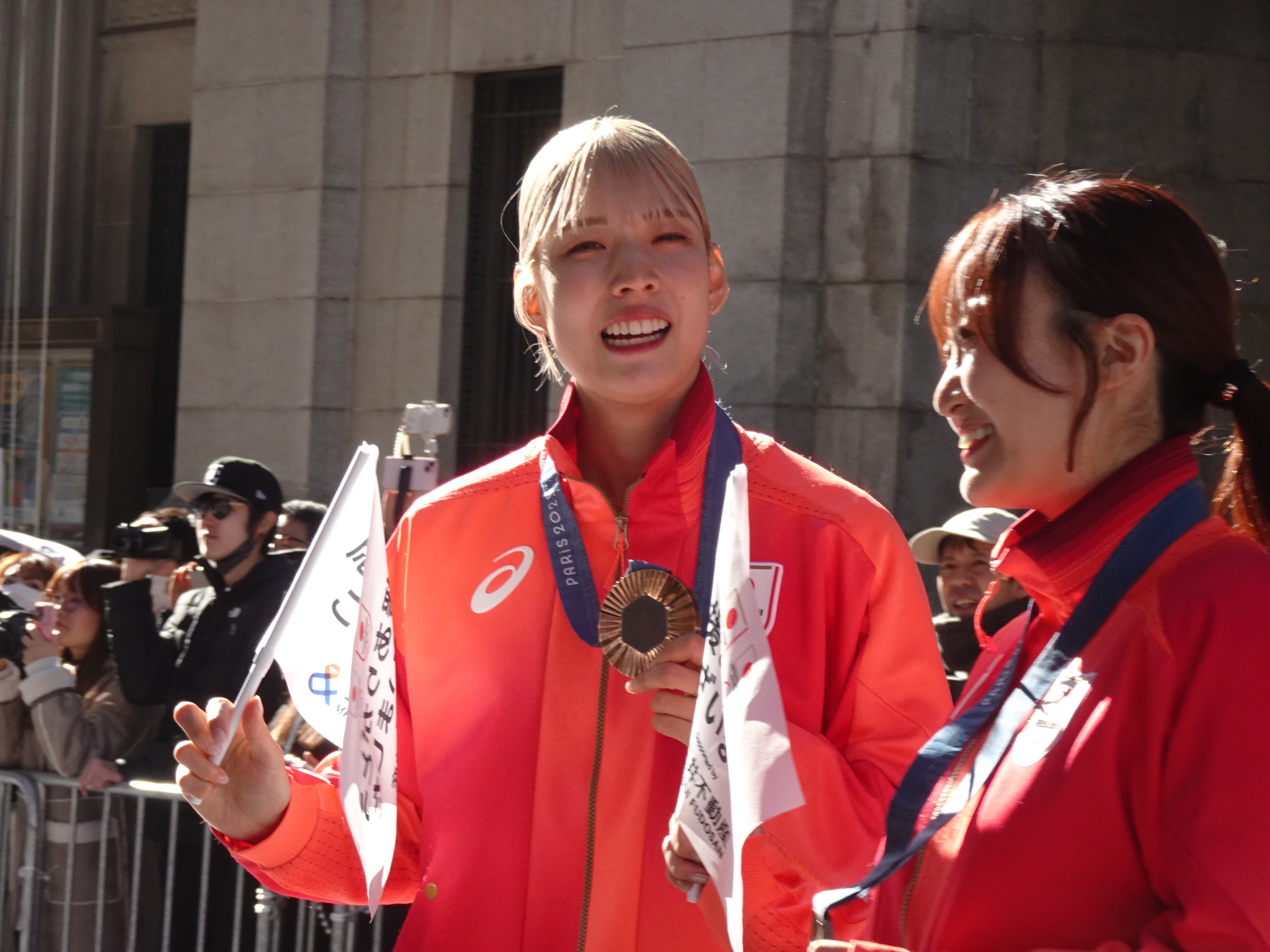
- Emura at Paris 2024 Summer Olympians and Paralympians Japan National Team parade event on November 30th, 2024

Personal information
- Born: 20 November 1998 (age 27) Ōita, Japan
- Height: 170 cm (5 ft 7 in)
- Weight: 56 kg (123 lb)

Fencing career
- Sport: Fencing
- Country: Japan
- Hand: Right-handed
- FIE ranking: current ranking
Medal record
Women's sabre
Representing Japan
Olympic Games
Bronze medal – third place	2024 Paris	Team
World Championships
Gold medal – first place	2022 Cairo	Individual
Gold medal – first place	2023 Milan	Individual
Bronze medal – third place	2022 Cairo	Team
Asian Games
Gold medal – first place	2026 Aichi–Nagoya	Individual
Silver medal – second place	2022 Hangzhou	Team
Silver medal – second place	026 Aichi–Nagoya	Team
Asian Fencing Championships
Gold medal – first place	2024 Kuwait City	Individual
Silver medal – second place	2014 Suwon	Individual
Silver medal – second place	2022 Seoul	Individual
Silver medal – second place	2022 Seoul	Team
Bronze medal – third place	2015 Singapore	Individual
Bronze medal – third place	2017 Hong Kong	Individual
Bronze medal – third place	2015 Singapore	Team
Bronze medal – third place	2016 Wuxi	Team
Bronze medal – third place	2017 Hong Kong	Team
Bronze medal – third place	2019 Chiba	Team
Bronze medal – third place	2024 Kuwait City	Team
Summer Universiade
Gold medal – first place	2017 Taipei	Team
Bronze medal – third place	2017 Taipei	Individual

Misaki Emura (Japanese: 江村美咲, born 20 November 1998) is a Japanese fencer. She is a two-time gold medalist in the women's sabre event at the World Fencing Championships (2022 and 2023). She also won the gold medal in her event at the 2024 Asian Fencing Championships held in Kuwait City, Kuwait.

== Career ==
In 2014, she won the gold medal in the mixed team event at the Summer Youth Olympics held in Nanjing, China. A month later, she competed in the women's individual sabre and women's team sabre events at the 2014 Asian Games held in Incheon, South Korea. In 2017, she competed in the women's sabre event at the World Fencing Championships held in Leipzig, Germany. She won one of the bronze medals in the women's individual sabre event at the 2017 Summer Universiade held in Taipei, Taiwan. She also won the gold medal in the women's team sabre event.

In 2021, she competed in the women's sabre event at the 2020 Summer Olympics held in Tokyo, Japan. She also competed in the women's team sabre event.

She won the silver medal in both the women's individual and team sabre events at the 2022 Asian Fencing Championships held in Seoul, South Korea. She won the gold medal in the women's sabre event at the 2022 World Fencing Championships held in Cairo, Egypt.

For the Paris 2024 Olympic Games, the Japanese Olympic Committee designated Emura and breakdancer Shigekix as the national delegation's flag bearers. In the individual sabre event, Emura lost to South Korean fencer Choi Se-Bin in the round of 16. In the team sabre event, Emura defeated France's Sara Balzer in the final bout to secure the bronze medal.

Olympic Games
Preceded by Rui Hachimura; Yui Susaki	Flagbearer for Japan; Paris 2024; With: Shigekix	Succeeded by Incumbent
