= Nadia Ben Azizi =

Tunisian fencer (born 2002)

Personal information
- Born: 9 July 2002 (age 24)

Fencing career
- Sport: Fencing
- Country: Tunisia

Nadia Ben Azizi (born 9 July 2002) is a Tunisian fencer. She competed in the women's sabre event at the 2020 Summer Olympics in Tokyo, Japan. She also competed in the women's team sabre event.
