= Jeon Eun-hye =

South Korean fencer (born 1997)

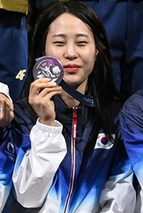
- Jeon at the 2024 Summer Olympics

Personal information
- Born: 1 August 1997 (age 28) Daejeon, South Korea
- Height: 1.65 m (5 ft 5 in)
Medal record
Women's fencing
Representing South Korea
Olympic Games
Silver medal – second place	2024 Paris	Team sabre
World Championships
Bronze medal – third place	2023 Milan	Team sabre
Asian Games
Bronze medal – third place	2022 Hangzhou	Team sabre

Jeon Eun-hye (Korean: 전은혜; born 1 August 1997) is a South Korean fencer. She competed in the 2024 Summer Olympics.
