= Caroline Queroli =

French sabre fencer

Personal information
- Born: 6 May 1998 (age 28)

Fencing career
- Sport: Fencing
- Country: French
- Weapon: Sabre
- Hand: right-handed
- National coach: Jean-Philippe Daurelle
- Club: Racing Club de France
- FIE ranking: current ranking
Medal record
Women's sabre
Representing France
World Championships
Gold medal – first place	2018 Wuxi	Team
Silver medal – second place	2019 Budapest	Team
Silver medal – second place	2022 Cairo	Team
Silver medal – second place	2023 Milan	Team
Bronze medal – third place	2017 Leipzig	Team
European Championships
Gold medal – first place	2022 Antalya	Team
Gold medal – first place	2024 Basel	Team
Bronze medal – third place	2018 Novi Sad	Team
Bronze medal – third place	2019 Düsseldorf	Team

Caroline Queroli (born 5 June 1998) is a French sabre fencer.

She participated at the 2019 World Fencing Championships, winning a medal.
