= Olga Nikitina =

Russian sabre fencer

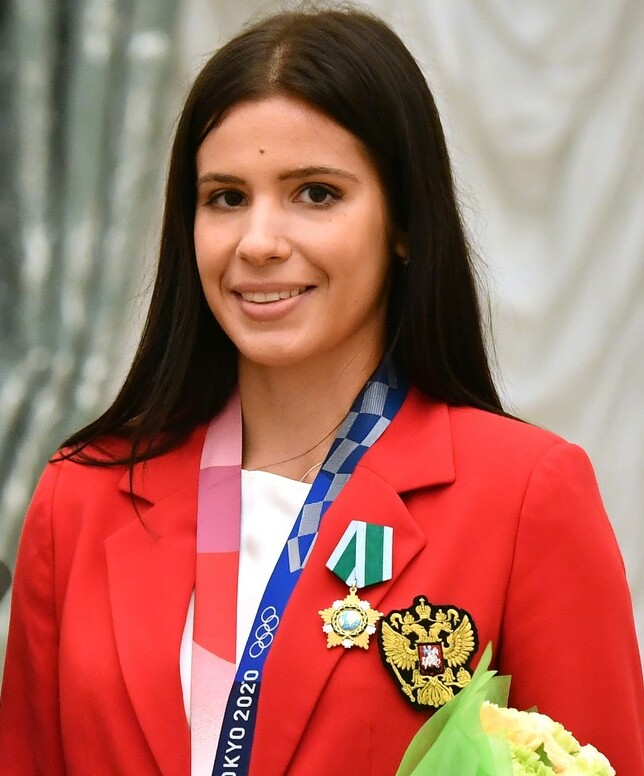
- Nikitina in September 2021

Personal information
- Full name: Olga Alekseyevna Nikitina
- Born: November 26, 1998 (age 27) Lipetsk, Russia

Fencing career
- Sport: Fencing
- Country: Russia
- Weapon: Sabre
- Hand: right-handed
- Club: CSKA Moscow (Central Sports Army Club) [RUS]; Moscow Sports School of Olympic Reserve No.42 [RUS].
- Head coach: Anzor Gagulashvili
- FIE ranking: current ranking
Medal record
Representing (Russia) ROC
| Gold medal – first place | 2020 Tokyo | Team sabre |
Representing Russia
World Championships
| Gold medal – first place | 2019 Budapest | Team sabre |
European Championships
| Gold medal – first place | 2019 Düsseldorf | Team sabre |
Military World Games
| Gold medal – first place | 2019 Wuhan | Team foil |
| Gold medal – first place | 2019 Wuhan | Team sabre |

Olga Alekseyevna Nikitina (Russian: Ольга Алексеевна Никитина, IPA: [ˈolʲɡə nʲɪˈkʲitʲɪnə]; born 26 November 1998) is a Russian right-handed sabre fencer, 2019 team European champion, 2019 team world champion, and 2021 team Olympic champion. Nikitina was part of the gold medal-winning Russian team at the 2019 World Fencing Championships held in Budapest, Hungary. She is a Russian Armed Forces athlete, and her clubs are the Russian Central Sports Army Club, and Moscow Sports School of Olympic Reserve No.42.

== Medal record ==
=== Olympic Games ===
| Year | Location | Event | Position |
|---|---|---|---|
| 2021 | Tokyo, Japan | Team Women's Sabre | 1st |

=== World Championship ===
| Year | Location | Event | Position |
|---|---|---|---|
| 2019 | Budapest, Hungary | Team Women's Sabre | 1st |

=== European Championship ===
| Year | Location | Event | Position |
|---|---|---|---|
| 2019 | Düsseldorf, Germany | Team Women's Sabre | 1st |

=== Grand Prix ===
| Date | Location | Event | Position |
|---|---|---|---|
| 01/10/2020 | Montreal, Canada | Individual Women's Sabre | 2nd |

=== World Cup ===
| Date | Location | Event | Position |
|---|---|---|---|
| 03/22/2019 | Sint-Niklaas, Belgium | Individual Women's Sabre | 2nd |
| 11/22/2019 | Orléans, France | Individual Women's Sabre | 2nd |
