= Renáta Katona =

Hungarian fencer (born 1994)

Personal information
- Born: 17 November 1994 (age 31)

Fencing career
- Sport: Fencing
- Country: Hungary
- Weapon: Sabre
- Hand: Right-handed
- FIE ranking: current ranking
Medal record
Women's sabre
Representing Hungary
World Championships
Gold medal – first place	2022 Cairo	Team
Gold medal – first place	2026 Hong Kong	Team
Bronze medal – third place	2025 Tbilisi	Team
European Games
Bronze medal – third place	2023 Kraków–Małopolska	Team
European Championships
Silver medal – second place	2019 Düsseldorf	Team
Bronze medal – third place	2023 Kraków	Team

Renáta Katona (born 17 November 1994) is a Hungarian sabre fencer. She is a world champion and won the gold medal in the women's team sabre event at the 2022 World Championships. Katona is also a European Championships silver and bronze medallist, and a Universiade silver medallist in the women's team sabre. She competed in the women's sabre and team sabre event at the 2020 Summer Olympics in Tokyo.

== Medal record ==
=== World Championship ===
Date	Location	Event	Position
2025	(Georgia (country)) Tbilisi, Georgia	Team Women's Sabre	3rd
