= Charlotte Lembach =

French fencer (born 1988)

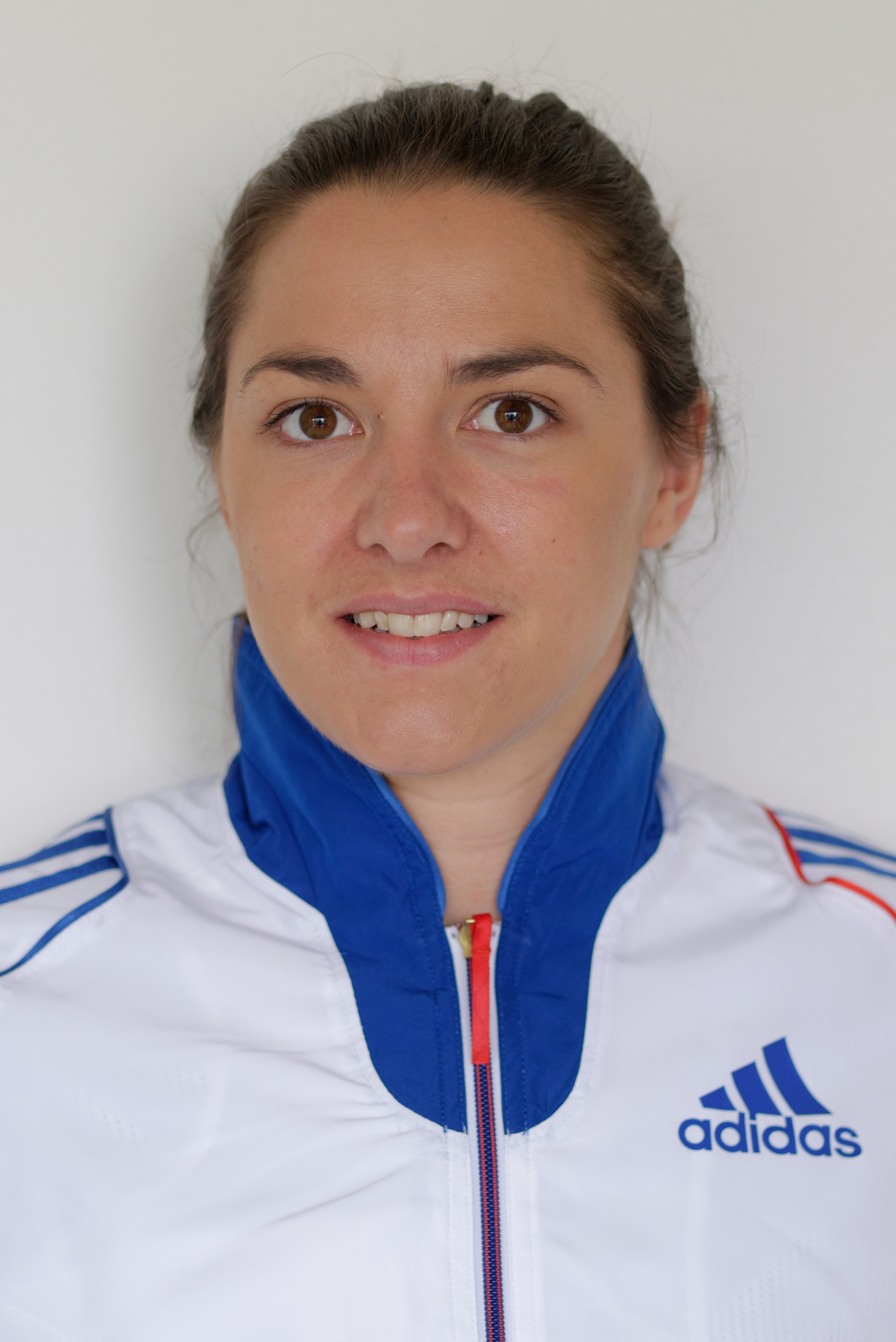
- Lembach in 2013

Personal information
- Nickname: Chacha
- Born: 1 April 1988 (age 38) Strasbourg, France
- Height: 1.64 m (5 ft 5 in)
- Weight: 69 kg (152 lb)

Fencing career
- Sport: Fencing
- Country: France
- Weapon: Sabre
- Hand: right-handed
- National coach: Jean-Philippe Daurelle
- Club: Strasbourg Université Club
- FIE ranking: current ranking
Medal record
Olympic Games
Silver medal – second place	2020 Tokyo	Team
World Championships
Gold medal – first place	2018 Wuxi	Team
Silver medal – second place	2014 Kazan	Team
Silver medal – second place	2019 Budapest	Team
Bronze medal – third place	2017 Leipzig	Team
European Championships
Silver medal – second place	2014 Strasbourg	Team
Silver medal – second place	2015 Montreux	Individual
Silver medal – second place	2015 Montreux	Team
Silver medal – second place	2016 Toruń	Team
Bronze medal – third place	2016 Toruń	Individual
Bronze medal – third place	2017 Tbilisi	Team
Bronze medal – third place	2018 Novi Sad	Team
Bronze medal – third place	2019 Düsseldorf	Team

Charlotte Lembach (born 1 April 1988) is a French right-handed sabre fencer, 2018 team world champion, two-time Olympian, and 2021 team Olympic silver medalist.

Lembach competed in the 2016 Rio de Janeiro Olympic Games and the 2020 Tokyo Olympic Games.

== Career ==
Lembach was first called into the French national team for the 2009 European Championships in Plovdiv, but a hamstring injury prevented her from attending the competition. She was selected again for the 2012 European Championships in Kyiv, but did not earn a qualification for the 2012 Summer Olympics in London.

After the Games, three members of the French team retired, leaving Lembach as team elder: at the age of 24 she acquired the nickname “Mamie” (“Granny”). The 2012–13 season saw her breakthrough: at Tianjin she climbed on the podium of a World Cup event, which no other French sportswomen had accomplished in two years and a half. She however failed to earn a medal in the 2013 European Championships and the 2013 World Championships.

In the 2013–14 season Jean-Philippe Daurelle replaced Cyril Tahon as coach of the French women's sabre team, which Lembach described as “a breath of fresh air”. Under his coaching Lembach won a silver medal in the Dakar World Cup and climbed to the podium in Chicago and Beijing. In the European Championships held in her native Strasbourg, Lembach defeated teammate Cécilia Berder, but failed in the second round against No.1 seed Vassiliki Vougiouka and finished 13th. In the team event, France defeated Germany, but were overcome in the semi-finals by reigning champions Russia. They prevailed over Poland to come away with a bronze medal. In the World Championships at Kazan, she fell in the second round again, this time at the hands of Małgorzata Kozaczuk of Poland. In the team event France defeated Hungary, then created an upset by beating Russia in the quarter-finals and Italy in the semi-finals. Their winning streak was snapped in the final by the United States led by twice-Olympic champion Mariel Zagunis and France came away with a silver medal.

Lembach is a student at EDHEC Business School.

== Medal record ==
=== Olympic Games ===
Year	Location	Event	Position
2021	Tokyo, Japan	Team Women's Sabre	2nd

=== World Championship ===
Year	Location	Event	Position
2014	Kazan, Russia	Team Women's Sabre	2nd
2017	Leipzig, Germany	Team Women's Sabre	3rd
2018	Wuxi, China	Team Women's Sabre	1st
2019	Budapest, Hungary	Team Women's Sabre	2nd

=== European Championship ===
Year	Location	Event	Position
2014	Strasbourg, France	Team Women's Sabre	2nd
2015	Montreux, Switzerland	Individual Women's Sabre	2nd
2015	Montreux, Switzerland	Team Women's Sabre	2nd
2016	Toruń, Poland	Individual Women's Sabre	3rd
2016	Toruń, Poland	Team Women's Sabre	2nd
2017	(Georgia (country)) Tbilisi, Georgia	Team Women's Sabre	3rd
2018	Novi Sad, Serbia	Team Women's Sabre	3rd
2019	Düsseldorf, Germany	Team Women's Sabre	3rd

=== Grand Prix ===
Date	Location	Event	Position
05/25/2013	Tianjin, China	Individual Women's Sabre	3rd
05/24/2014	Beijing, China	Individual Women's Sabre	3rd
06/02/2017	Moscow, Russia	Individual Women's Sabre	1st
01/10/2020	Montreal, Canada	Individual Women's Sabre	3rd

=== World Cup ===
Date	Location	Event	Position
02/07/2014	Dakar, Senegal	Individual Women's Sabre	2nd
05/02/2014	(United States) Chicago, Illinois	Individual Women's Sabre	3rd
11/01/2014	Margarita Island, Venezuela	Individual Women's Sabre	2nd
02/17/2017	Athens, Greece	Individual Women's Sabre	3rd
01/26/2018	(United States) Baltimore, Maryland	Individual Women's Sabre	3rd
05/10/2019	Tunis, Tunisia	Individual Women's Sabre	3rd
