= Shihomi Fukushima =

Japanese fencer (born 1995)

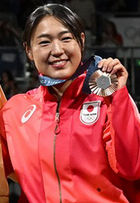
- Fukushima at the 2024 Summer Olympics

Personal information
- Native name: 福島史帆実
- Born: 19 June 1995 (age 31) Munakata, Fukuoka, Japan

Fencing career
- Sport: Fencing
- Country: Japan
- Weapon: Sabre
- Hand: Right-handed
Medal record
Women's sabre
Representing Japan
Olympic Games
| Bronze medal – third place | 2024 Paris | Team |
World Championships
| Bronze medal – third place | 2022 Cairo | Team |
Asian Games
| Silver medal – second place | 2022 Hangzhou | Team |
| Bronze medal – third place | 2018 Jakarta | Team |
Asian Fencing Championships
| Silver medal – second place | 2022 Seoul | Team |
| Bronze medal – third place | 2019 Chiba | Individual |
| Bronze medal – third place | 2017 Hong Kong | Team |
| Bronze medal – third place | 2019 Chiba | Team |
| Bronze medal – third place | 2024 Kuwait City | Team |
Summer Universiade
| Gold medal – first place | 2017 Taipei | Team |

Shihomi Fukushima (born 19 June 1995) is a Japanese fencer. She won one of the bronze medals in the women's team sabre event at the 2018 Asian Games held in Jakarta, Indonesia.

== Career ==
In 2017, she won one of the bronze medals in the women's team sabre event at the Asian Fencing Championships held in Hong Kong. In that same year, she won the gold medal in the women's team sabre event at the 2017 Summer Universiade in Taipei, Taiwan. In 2019, she won one of the bronze medals in the women's sabre event at the Asian Fencing Championships held in Chiba, Japan. She also won the bronze medal in the women's team sabre event.

In 2021, she competed in the women's team sabre event at the 2020 Summer Olympics held in Tokyo, Japan. The Japanese team finished in 5th place.
