= Norika Tamura =

Japanese fencer (born 1991)

Personal information
- Nationality: Japanese
- Born: 20 June 1991 (age 35)

Sport
- Sport: Fencing
Medal record
Women's fencing
Representing Japan
Asian Games
Bronze medal – third place	2018 Jakarta-Palembang	Individual sabre
Bronze medal – third place	2018 Jakarta-Palembang	team sabre
Asian Fencing Championships
Silver medal – second place	2019 Chiba	Individual sabre
Bronze medal – third place	2015 Singapore	Team Sabre
Bronze medal – third place	2016 Wuxi	Team Sabre
Bronze medal – third place	2017 Hong Kong	Team Sabre
Bronze medal – third place	2019 Chiba	Team Sabre

Norika Tamura (born 20 June 1991) is a Japanese fencer. She competed in the women's individual sabre event at the 2018 Asian Games, winning the bronze medal.
