= Chika Aoki =

Japanese fencer (born 1990)

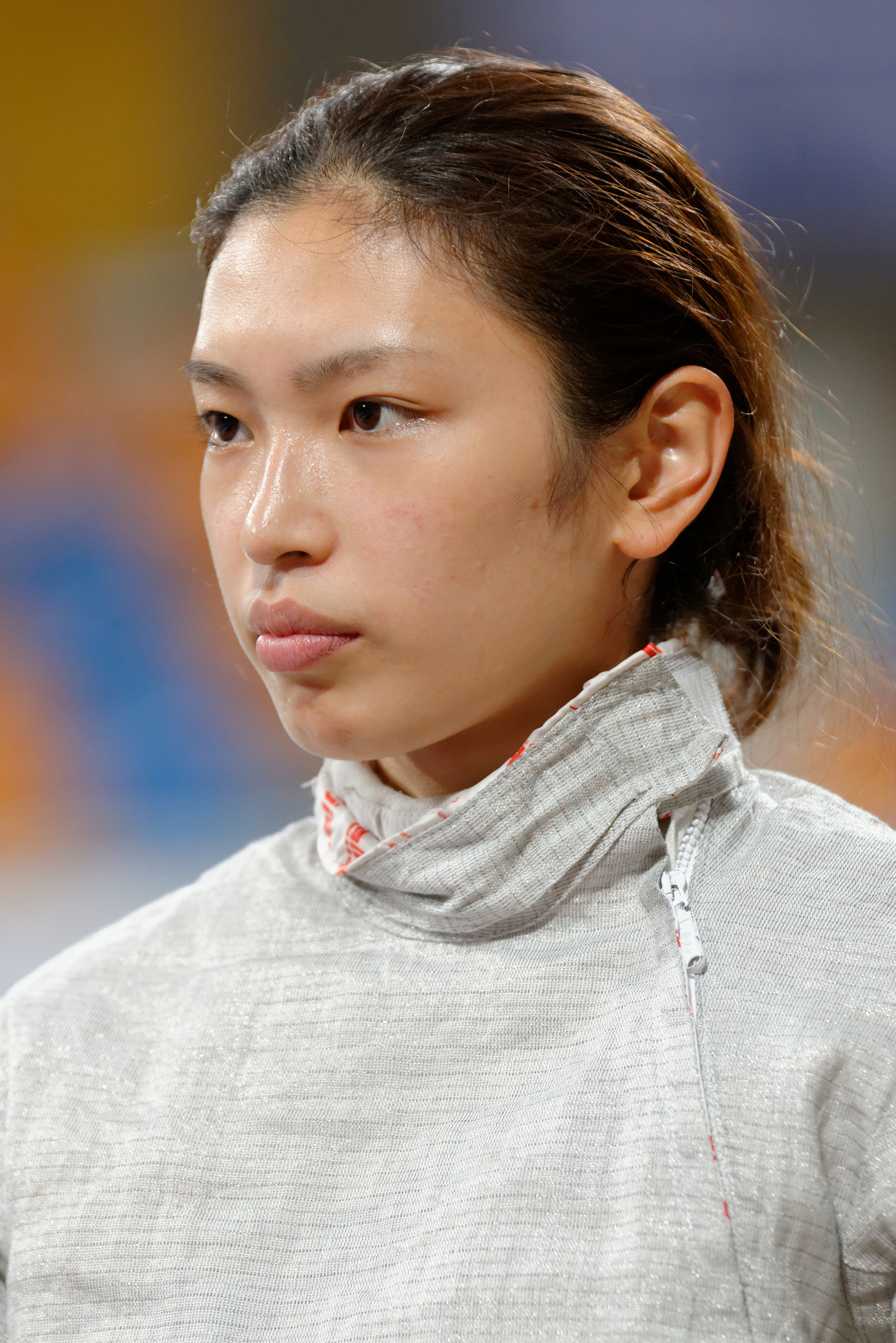
- Aoki in 2014

Personal information
- Nickname: あおちゃん
- Born: 21 February 1990 (age 36)
- Height: 1.58 m (5 ft 2 in)
- Weight: 54 kg (119 lb)

Fencing career
- Sport: Fencing
- Country: Japan
- Weapon: Sabre
- Hand: Right-handed
Medal record
Asian Games
Bronze medal – third place	2018 Jakarta-Palembang	team sabre
Asian Fencing Championships
Silver medal – second place	2015 Singapore	Individual sabre
Bronze medal – third place	2011 Seoul	Team sabre
Bronze medal – third place	2015 Singapore	Team sabre
Bronze medal – third place	2016 Wuxi	Team sabre
Bronze medal – third place	2017 Hong Kong	Team sabre
Bronze medal – third place	2019 Chiba	Team sabre

Chika Aoki (青木 千佳, Aoki Chika; born February 21, 1990) is a Japanese fencer who participated in the women's sabre individual fencing event at the 2016 Summer Olympics.

== Achievements ==
Ranking at the World Cup

Year	2011	2012	2013	2014	2015
Place	119	286	85	152	31
