= Qian Jiarui =

Chinese fencer (born 1992)

Personal information
- Nationality: Chinese
- Born: 30 May 1992 (age 34)

Sport
- Sport: Fencing
Medal record
Women's fencing
Representing China
Asian Games
Gold medal – first place	2018 Jakarta-Palembang	Individual sabre
Military World Games
Silver medal – second place	2019 Wuhan	Individual sabre

Qian Jiarui (simplified Chinese: 钱佳睿; traditional Chinese: 錢佳睿; pinyin: Qián Jiāruì; born 30 May 1992) is a Chinese fencer. She competed in the women's individual sabre event at the 2018 Asian Games, winning the gold medal.
