= Yang Hengyu =

Chinese fencer (born 1996)

Personal information
- Nationality: Chinese
- Born: 22 July 1996 (age 29)
- Height: 1.79 m (5 ft 10 in)

Sport
- Rank: 27
- Coached by: Zhang Aimin, Frederic Baylac
Medal record
Women's sabre
Representing China
Asian Games
Silver medal – second place	2018 Jakarta	Team
Bronze medal – third place	2022 Hangzhou	Team
Asian Championships
Gold medal – first place	2024 Kuwait City	Team

Yang Hengyu (born 22 July 1996) is a Chinese fencer.

Hengyu began fencing her third year of primary school. She is right-handed, and a sabreuse.

== 2020 Tokyo Olympics ==
She was one of 406 Chinese athletes chosen to compete in the 2020 Tokyo Summer Olympics. She finished 16th in the Women's Sabre Individual event after being defeated by Sofia Pozdniakova 7th competing as part of the Women's Sabre Team.
