= Hwang Seon-a =

South Korean fencer (born 1989)

Personal information
- Born: 16 September 1989 (age 36) Uljin, South Korea
- Height: 1.63 m (5 ft 4 in)
- Weight: 55 kg (121 lb)

Fencing career
- Sport: Fencing
- Country: South Korea
- Weapon: Sabre
- Hand: right-handed
- National coach: Han Joo-Yeol
- Club: Iksan City Hall
- Head coach: Lee Su-Geun
- FIE ranking: current ranking
Medal record
World Championships
Silver medal – second place	2017 Leipzig	Team
Bronze medal – third place	2019 Budapest	Team
Asian Championships
Gold medal – first place	2016 Singapore	Team
Gold medal – first place	2016 Wuxi	Individual
Silver medal – second place	2014 Suwon	Team
Silver medal – second place	2016 Wuxi	Team
Silver medal – second place	2017 Hong Kong	Team
Silver medal – second place	2018 Bangkok	Team
Silver medal – second place	2019 Chiba	Team

- Hwang Seon-a
- Hangul: 황선아
- Hanja: 黃仙妸
- RR: Hwang Seona
- MR: Hwang Sŏna

Hwang Seon-a (Korean: 황선아;Korean pronunciation: [hwaŋ.sʌ.na]; born 16 September 1989) is a South Korean fencer. She earned a gold medal for South Korea in women's team sabre at the 2014 Asian Games along with teammates Kim Ji-yeon, Lee Ra-jin, and Yoon Ji-su. She participated in the women's sabre solo fencing event and the women's sabre team fencing event at the 2016 Summer Olympics.
