= Shao Yaqi =

Chinese fencer (born 1996)

Personal information
- Nationality: Chinese
- Born: 28 November 1996 (age 29)

Sport
- Sport: Fencing
Medal record
Women's fencing
Representing China
Asian Games
Silver medal – second place	2018 Jakarta-Palembang	Individual
Silver medal – second place	2018 Jakarta-Palembang	Team
Silver medal – second place	2022 Hangzhou	Individual
Bronze medal – third place	2022 Hangzhou	Team

Shao Yaqi (Chinese: 邵雅琦; pinyin: Shào Yǎqí; born 28 November 1996) is a Chinese fencer. She competed in the women's individual sabre event at the 2018 Asian Games, winning the silver medal.
