= Au Sin Ying =

Hong Kong fencer (born 1989)

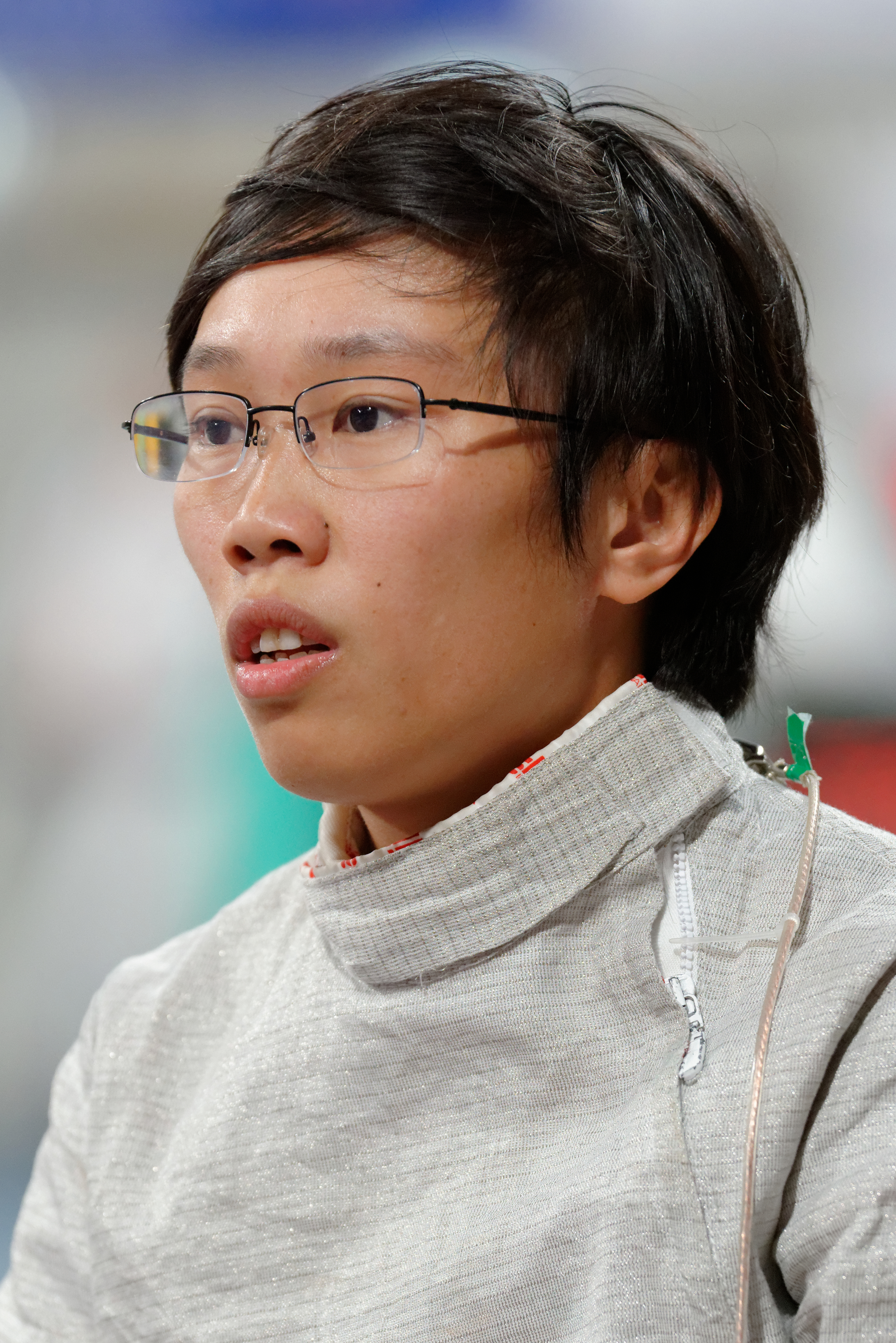

Personal information
- Nickname: Glasses Swordsman
- Nationality: Hong Kong
- Born: 8 January 1989 (age 37) Hong Kong, Hong Kong
- Height: 1.67 m (5 ft 5 1/2 in)
- Weight: 66 kg (146 lb)

Fencing career
- Sport: Fencing
- Weapon: sabre
- Hand: right-handed
- National coach: Wong Yuet Kei
- Club: Hong Kong Fencing; Association
- FIE ranking: current ranking
Medal record
Women's sabre
Representing Hong Kong
World Cup
Bronze medal – third place	2010 Pattaya City	Individual
Asian Games
Silver medal – second place	2010 Guangzhou	Individual
Bronze medal – third place	2010 Guangzhou	Team
Bronze medal – third place	2014 Incheon	Team
Asian Championships
Bronze medal – third place	2007 Nantong	Team
Bronze medal – third place	2009 Doha	Team
Bronze medal – third place	2010 Seoul	Team
Bronze medal – third place	2013 Shanghai	Team
Bronze medal – third place	2014 Suwon	Team
Bronze medal – third place	2015 Singapore	Team
Bronze medal – third place	2017 Hong Kong	Team
Bronze medal – third place	2018 Bangkok	Team
Bronze medal – third place	2024 Kuwait City	Team
East Asian Games
Bronze medal – third place	2013 Tianjin	Team

Au Sin Ying
- Traditional Chinese: 歐倩瑩
Transcriptions
Standard Mandarin
- Hanyu Pinyin: Qū Xianyǐng
Yue: Cantonese
- Yale Romanization: Āu Sin yìhng
- Jyutping: Au^{1} Sin^{3} jing^{4}

Au Sin Ying (Chinese: 歐倩瑩; born 8 January 1989 in Hong Kong) is a Hong Kong sabre fencer.

Au earned a bronze medal in the Pattaya City World Cup in 2010. The same year, she won an individual silver medal and a team bronze medal at the Asian Games in Guangzhou, China.

She was one of the torchbearers for the 2011 University Games.

Au represented Hong Kong at the 2012 Summer Olympics in London, where she competed in the women's individual sabre event. She lost in the first round to Tunisian fencer and two-time Olympian Azza Besbes, with a final score of 13–15. She reached the table of 32 at the 2014 World Championships in Kazan after defeating Venezuela's Alejandra Benítez, but lost to eventual bronze medallist Vassiliki Vougiouka of Greece.

Au is a resident athlete of the Hong Kong Fencing Association, and is coached and trained by Wong Yuet Kei.
