= Yoon Ji-su =

South Korean fencer (born 1993)

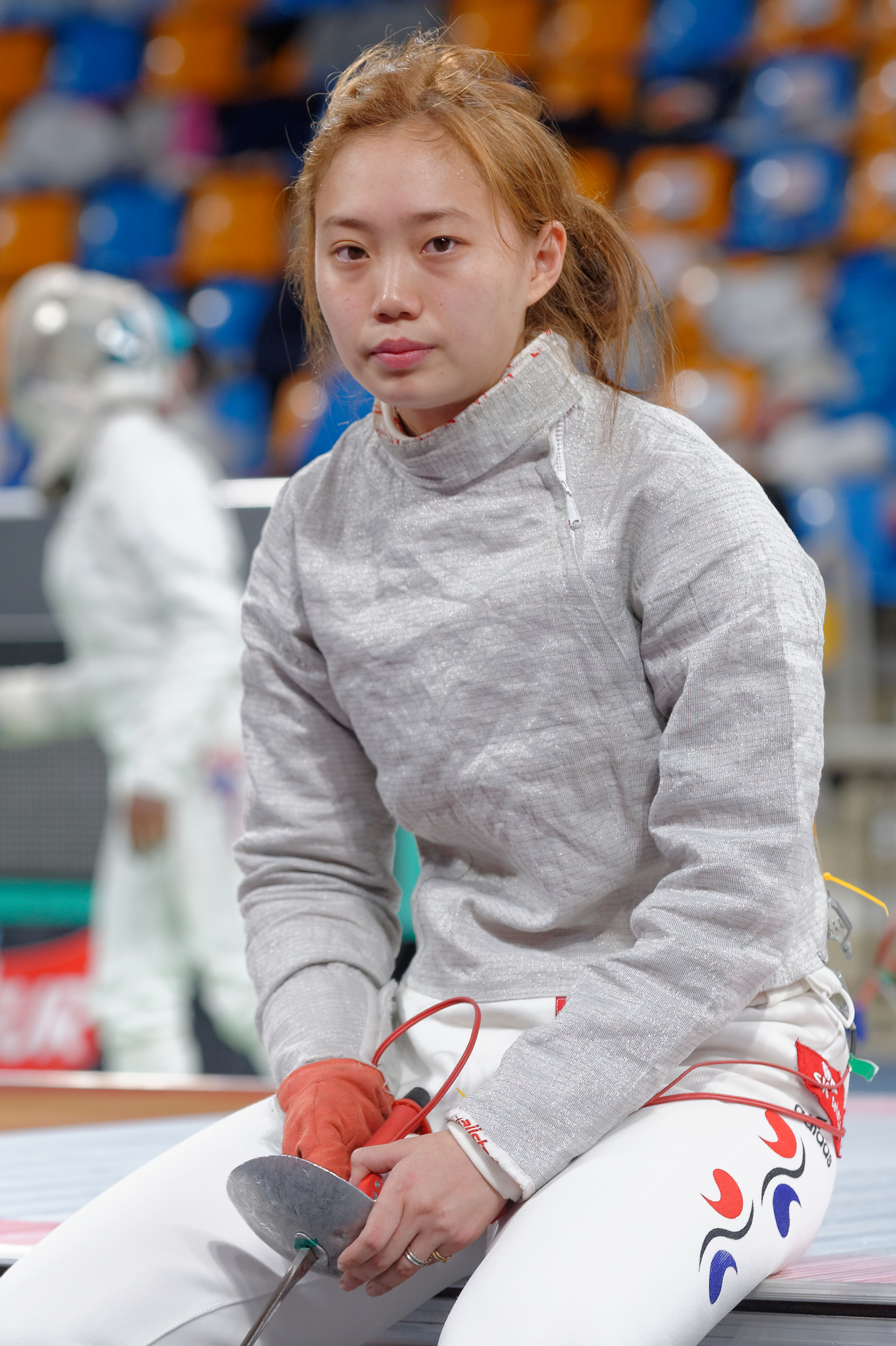
- Yoon in 2014

Personal information
- Born: 24 January 1993 (age 33) Busan, South Korea
- Height: 1.70 m (5 ft 7 in)
- Weight: 60 kg (132 lb)

Fencing career
- Sport: Fencing
- Country: South Korea
- Weapon: Sabre
- Hand: right-handed
- National coach: Han Joo-yeol
- Club: Seoul Metropolitan Government
- Head coach: Cho Jong-hyung
- FIE ranking: current ranking
Medal record
Women's sabre
Representing South Korea
Olympic Games
Silver medal – second place	2024 Paris	Team
Bronze medal – third place	2020 Tokyo	Team
World Championships
Silver medal – second place	2017 Leipzig	Team
Bronze medal – third place	2018 Wuxi	Team
Bronze medal – third place	2019 Budapest	Team
Bronze medal – third place	2023 Milan	Team
Asian Games
Gold medal – first place	2014 Incheon	Team
Gold medal – first place	2018 Jakarta–Palembang	Team
Gold medal – first place	2022 Hangzhou	Individual
Bronze medal – third place	2022 Hangzhou	Team
Asian Championships
Gold medal – first place	2012 Wakayama	Individual
Gold medal – first place	2019 Chiba	Individual
Gold medal – first place	2012 Wakayama	Team
Gold medal – first place	2013 Shanghai	Team
Gold medal – first place	2015 Singapore	Team
Silver medal – second place	2014 Suwon	Team
Silver medal – second place	2016 Wuxi	Team
Silver medal – second place	2017 Hong Kong	Team
Silver medal – second place	2018 Bangkok	Team
Silver medal – second place	2019 Chiba	Team
Silver medal – second place	2024 Kuwait City	Individual
Bronze medal – third place	2016 Wuxi	Individual
Bronze medal – third place	2024 Kuwait City	Team

Yoon Ji-su (Korean: 윤지수; Korean pronunciation: [jun.dʑi.su] or [jun] [tɕi.su]; born 24 January 1993) is a South Korean right-handed sabre fencer.

Yoon is a four-time team Asian champion and a two-time individual Asian champion.

A two-time Olympian, Yoon is a 2021 team Olympic bronze medalist.

== Early life ==
Yoon is the youngest of two children and only daughter of retired baseball player and coach Yoon Hak-kil. She was born and raised in Busan as her father was a "one-team man" who spent his entire playing career and part of his coaching career with Lotte Giants. Her father had been initially opposed to her becoming a professional athlete but relented after much persuasion.

Yoon was initially a taekwondo athlete in elementary school before switching to fencing in middle school. As a high school student, she participated in the 2010 Junior World Fencing Championships.

== Career ==
Yoon was first selected for the senior national team in 2011 and won individual gold at the 2012 Asian Championships. She did not participate in the 2012 Summer Olympics as the women's team sabre was not in rotation and she was not ranked high enough to be selected for the individual event. In 2014, she was part of the team along with Kim Ji-yeon, Hwang Seon-a and Lee Ra-jin and they won silver at the Asian Championships and gold at the Asian Games.

Yoon won her first ever Fencing World Cup medal in October 2015, at the Orléans competition. She was joint bronze medalist with Ibtihaj Muhammad. At the 2016 Summer Olympics, she only participated in the team event but they failed to win a medal after losing to Ukraine at the first stage. She won her first World Championships medal when they won silver in the team event at the 2017 World Championships.

== Medal record ==
=== Olympic Games ===
Year	Location	Event	Position
2021	Tokyo, Japan	Team Women's Sabre	3rd

=== World Championship ===
Year	Location	Event	Position
2017	Leipzig, Germany	Team Women's Sabre	2nd
2018	Wuxi, China	Team Women's Sabre	3rd
2019	Budapest, Hungary	Team Women's Sabre	3rd

=== Asian Championship ===
Year	Location	Event	Position
2012	Wakayama, Japan	Individual Women's Sabre	1st
2012	Wakayama, Japan	Team Women's Sabre	1st
2013	Shanghai, China	Team Women's Sabre	1st
2014	Suwon, South Korea	Team Women's Sabre	2nd
2015	Singapore	Team Women's Sabre	1st
2016	Wuxi, China	Individual Women's Sabre	3rd
2016	Wuxi, China	Team Women's Sabre	2nd
2017	Hong Kong, China	Team Women's Sabre	2nd
2018	Bangkok, Thailand	Team Women's Sabre	2nd
2019	Tokyo, Japan	Individual Women's Sabre	1st
2019	Tokyo, Japan	Team Women's Sabre	2nd
2022	Seoul, South Korea	Team Women's Sabre	1st

=== Grand Prix ===
Date	Location	Event	Position
2021-11-12	Orléans, France	Individual Women's Sabre	3rd

=== World Cup ===
Date	Location	Event	Position
2015-10-30	Orléans, France	Individual Women's Sabre	3rd
2021-03-12	Budapest, Hungary	Individual Women's Sabre	3rd

== Personal life ==
Yoon attended Dong-Eui University, one of the few universities with a fencing team, and was contemporaries with fellow sabre fencer Kim Jun-ho. She is enrolled as a graduate student at Kookmin University, studying sports psychology.
