= Fencing at the 2024 Summer Olympics – Qualification =

This article details the qualifying phase for fencing at the 2024 Summer Olympics. The competition would comprise a total of 212 fencers, with an equal distribution between men and women, coming from the different National Olympic Committees (NOCs), similar to the Tokyo 2020 roster size. Qualified NOCs could enter a maximum of eighteen fencers (nine per gender), with each consisting of a trio, whether men's or women's, across all weapon-based team events (foil, épée, and sabre).

About two-thirds of the total quota would be attributed to the world's top fencers based on the points accrued in the Fédération Internationale d'Escrime (FIE) Official Ranking between April 3, 2023 and April 1, 2024, with further individual places available at each of the four zonal qualifying tournaments (Africa, Asia & Oceania, Europe, and the Americas).

The team events will offer eight to nine spots for all registered NOCs competing in each weapon. Each team must be composed of three fencers (or a fencing trio). The top four teams in each weapon will qualify directly for the Games, with the next set of places assigned to the highest-ranked nation from each of the continental zones (Africa, Asia & Oceania, Europe, and the Americas) between fifth and sixteenth position. If a zone does not have any teams within the specified ranking (from fifth to sixteenth place), the top-ranked team eligible for qualification will secure a spot irrespective of the continent.

For the individual events, quota places vary from a minimum of 34 to a maximum of 37. With the team members directly entered into their respective individual competitions, six more places will be awarded to the eligible fencers based on the FIE Adjusted Official Ranking list by the continental zone of April 1, 2024: the top two fencers each from Europe and Asia & Oceania; and the highest-ranked fencer each from the Americas and Africa. The zonal qualifying tournaments will offer four available spots with one each to the NOCs without a qualified fencer, male or female, in one or more weapons by the two previous pathways.

Host nation France reserves six fencing spots to be distributed between the team and individual events apart from the qualified fencers through the pathways mentioned above, respecting the maximum quota of athletes per NOC (three per weapon). If the French fencers qualified directly for the team event, they can use two quota places if the NOC contains a single qualified fencer in a corresponding individual event; or three if none of them compete in a corresponding individual event. Two further spots, along with those unused by the host country, will be attributed to the eligible NOCs interested to have their fencers compete in Paris under the Universality rules, respecting the 37-fencer limit for each weapon-based individual event.

== Timeline ==
Section	Date	Venue
FIE Official Ranking (start)	April 3, 2023	—
FIE Official Ranking (end)	April 1, 2024	—
Zonal Qualifying Tournament – America	April 6–7, 2024	(Costa Rica) San Jose
Zonal Qualifying Tournament – Europe	April 26–28, 2024	(Luxembourg) Differdange
Zonal Qualifying Tournament – Africa	April 27, 2024	(Algeria) Algiers
Zonal Qualifying Tournament – Asia & Oceania	April 27–28, 2024	(United Arab Emirates) Dubai

== Qualification summary ==
Nation	Men						Women						Total
Nation	Individual			Team			Individual			Team			Total
Nation	Épée	Foil	Sabre	Épée	Foil	Sabre	Épée	Foil	Sabre	Épée	Foil	Sabre	Total
Algeria		1							3			Yes	4
Argentina			1										1
Azerbaijan									1				1
Belgium	1												1
Brazil		1					1	1					3
Bulgaria									1				1
Canada	1	3	3		Yes	Yes	1	3	1		Yes		12
Cape Verde		1											1
Chile								1					1
China	1	3	1		Yes		3	3	1	Yes	Yes		12
Chinese Taipei		1											1
Colombia	1												1
Cyprus		1											1
Czech Republic	3	1		Yes									4
Egypt	3	3	3	Yes	Yes	Yes	3	3	1	Yes	Yes		16
Estonia							1						1
France	3	3	3	Yes	Yes	Yes	3	3	3	Yes	Yes	Yes	18
Georgia			1										1
Germany			1					1					2
Greece									1				1
Hong Kong	1	1					1	1					4
Hungary	3	1	3	Yes		Yes	1	1	3			Yes	12
Iran			3			Yes							3
Israel	1												1
Italy	3	3	3	Yes	Yes	Yes	3	3	3	Yes	Yes	Yes	18
Ivory Coast		1						1					2
Japan	3	3	1	Yes	Yes		1	3	3		Yes	Yes	14
Kazakhstan	3			Yes					1				4
Kenya							1						1
Kuwait			1										1
Lebanon		1											1
Mexico			1										1
Morocco	1							1					2
Netherlands	1												1
Niger			1										1
Peru							1						1
Philippines								1					1
Poland		3			Yes		3	3		Yes	Yes		9
Romania								1					1
Rwanda							1						1
Senegal							1						1
Singapore							1	1					2
South Africa	1												1
South Korea	1	1	3			Yes	3		3	Yes		Yes	11
Spain		1							1				2
Switzerland	1						1						2
Tunisia			1						1				2
Turkey			1						1				2
Ukraine							3		3	Yes		Yes	6
United States		3	3		Yes	Yes	3	3	3	Yes	Yes	Yes	15
Uzbekistan									1				1
Venezuela	3			Yes					1				4
Virgin Islands		1											1
Total: 52 NOCs	35	37	34	8	8	8	36	34	36	8	8	8	212

== Men's events ==
=== Men's épée ===
Standard	Places	Qualified fencer
Qualified team members	24	Yannick Borel (FRA); Romain Cannone (FRA); Luidgi Midleton (FRA); Davide Di Veroli (ITA); Andrea Santarelli (ITA); Federico Vismara (ITA); Koki Kano (JPN); Kazuyasu Minobe (JPN); Masaru Yamada (JPN); Tibor Andrásfi (HUN); Máté Koch (HUN); Gergely Siklósi (HUN); Ruslan Kurbanov (KAZ); Elmir Alimzhanov (KAZ); Vadim Sharlaimov (KAZ); Rubén Limardo (VEN); Francisco Limardo (VEN); Grabiel Lugo (VEN); Jiří Beran (CZE); Jakub Jurka (CZE); Martin Rubeš (CZE); Mohamed El-Sayed (EGY); Mohamed Yasseen (EGY); Mahmoud Mohsen (EGY)
Top 2 individual AOR: Asia & Oceania	2	Wang Zijie (CHN); Kim Jae-won (KOR)
Top individual AOR: Africa	1	Houssam El Kord (MAR)
Top individual AOR: America	1	Jhon Édison Rodríguez (COL)
Top 2 individual AOR: Europe	2	Yuval Freilich (ISR); Neisser Loyola (BEL)
Zonal tournament: Asia & Oceania	1	Ho Wai Hang (HKG)
Zonal tournament: Africa	1	Harry Saner (RSA)
Zonal tournament: America	1	Nicholas Zhang (CAN)
Zonal tournament: Europe	1	Tristan Tulen (NED)
Re-allocation of unused quota	1	Alexis Bayard (SUI)
Total	35	

=== Men's team épée ===
Standard	Places	Qualified teams
Top four in FIE Official Team Ranking	4	France; Italy; Japan; Hungary
Top team from Africa in positions 5–16	1	Egypt
Top team from Asia & Oceania in positions 5–16	1	Kazakhstan
Top team from America in positions 5–16	1	Venezuela
Top team from Europe in positions 5–16	1	Czech Republic
Host country option	0	—
Total	8	

=== Men's foil ===
Standard	Places	Qualified fencer
Qualified team members	24	Kazuki Iimura (JPN); Kyosuke Matsuyama (JPN); Takahiro Shikine (JPN); Guillaume Bianchi (ITA); Filippo Macchi (ITA); Tommaso Marini (ITA); Nick Itkin (USA); Alexander Massialas (USA); Gerek Meinhardt (USA); Enzo Lefort (FRA); Julien Mertine (FRA); Maxime Pauty (FRA); Chen Haiwei (CHN); Mo Zhiwei (CHN); Xu Jie (CHN); Alaaeldin Abouelkassem (EGY); Mohamed Hamza (EGY); Abdelrahman Tolba (EGY); Jan Jurkiewicz (POL); Michał Siess (POL); Adrian Wojtkowiak (POL); Blake Broszus (CAN); Daniel Gu (CAN); Maximilien Van Haaster (CAN)
Top 2 individual AOR: Asia & Oceania	2	Cheung Ka Long (HKG); Ha Tae-gyu (KOR)
Top individual AOR: Africa	1	Salim Heroui (ALG)
Top individual AOR: America	1	Guilherme Toldo (BRA)
Top 2 individual AOR: Europe	2	Dániel Dósa (HUN); Alexander Choupenitch (CZE)
Zonal tournament: Asia & Oceania	1	Chen Yi-tung (TPE)
Zonal tournament: Africa	1	Jérémy Keryhuel (CIV)
Zonal tournament: America	1	Kruz Schembri (ISV)
Zonal tournament: Europe	1	Alex Tofalides (CYP)
Tripartite Invitation	2	Victor Alvares (CPV); Philippe Wakim (LBN)
Reallocation of unused quota	1	Carlos Llavador (ESP)
Total	37	

=== Men's team foil ===
Standard	Places	Qualified teams
Top four in FIE Official Team Ranking	4	Japan; Italy; United States; France
Top team from Africa in positions 5–16	1	Egypt
Top team from Asia & Oceania in positions 5–16	1	China
Top team from America in positions 5–16	1	Canada
Top team from Europe in positions 5–16	1	Poland
Host country option	0	—
Total	8	

=== Men's sabre ===
Standard	Places	Qualified fencer
Qualified team members	24	Gu Bon-gil (KOR); Oh Sang-uk (KOR); Park Sang-won (KOR); Eli Dershwitz (USA); Colin Heathcock (USA); Mitchell Saron (USA); Csanád Gémesi (HUN); András Szatmári (HUN); Áron Szilágyi (HUN); Boladé Apithy (FRA); Sébastien Patrice (FRA); Maxime Pianfetti (FRA); Luca Curatoli (ITA); Luigi Samele (ITA); Michele Gallo (ITA); Ali Pakdaman (IRI); Mohammad Rahbari (IRI); Mohammad Fotouhi (IRI); Ziad El-Sissy (EGY); Adham Moataz (EGY); Mohamed Amer (EGY); François Cauchon (CAN); Shaul Gordon (CAN); Fares Arfa (CAN)
Top 2 individual AOR: Asia & Oceania	2	Kento Yoshida (JPN); Yousef Al-Shamlan (KUW)
Top individual AOR: Africa	1	Farès Ferjani (TUN)
Top individual AOR: America	1	Pascual di Tella (ARG)
Top 2 individual AOR: Europe	2	Sandro Bazadze (GEO); Matyas Szabo (GER)
Zonal tournament: Asia & Oceania	1	Shen Chenpeng (CHN)
Zonal tournament: Africa	1	Evann Girault (NIG)
Zonal tournament: America	1	Gibrán Zea (MEX)
Zonal tournament: Europe	1	Enver Yıldırım (TUR)
Total	34	

=== Men's team sabre ===
Standard	Places	Qualified teams
Top four in FIE Official Team Ranking	4	South Korea; United States; Hungary; France
Top team from Africa in positions 5–16	1	Egypt
Top team from Asia & Oceania in positions 5–16	1	Iran
Top team from America in positions 5–16	1	Canada
Top team from Europe in positions 5–16	1	Italy
Host country option	0	—
Total	8	

== Women's events ==
=== Women's épée ===
Standard	Places	Qualified fencer
Qualified team members	24	Rossella Fiamingo (ITA); Giulia Rizzi (ITA); Alberta Santuccio (ITA); Lee Hye-in (KOR); Kang Young-mi (KOR); Song Se-ra (KOR); Alicja Klasik (POL); Renata Knapik-Miazga (POL); Martyna Swatowska-Wenglarczyk (POL); Marie-Florence Candassamy (FRA); Auriane Mallo (FRA); Coraline Vitalis (FRA); Vlada Kharkova (UKR); Olena Kryvytska (UKR); Dzhoan Feybi Bezhura (UKR); Anne Cebula (USA); Hadley Husisian (USA); Margherita Guzzi Vincenti (USA); Sun Yiwen (CHN); Yu Sihan (CHN); Tang Junyao (CHN); Nardin Ehab (EGY); Aya Hussein (EGY); Shirwit Gaber (EGY)
Top 2 individual AOR: Asia & Oceania	2	Vivian Kong (HKG); Miho Yoshimura (JPN)
Top individual AOR: Africa	1	Alexandra Ndolo (KEN)
Top individual AOR: America	1	Nathalie Moellhausen (BRA)
Top 2 individual AOR: Europe	2	Eszter Muhari (HUN); Nelli Differt (EST)
Zonal tournament: Asia & Oceania	1	Kiria Tikanah (SGP)
Zonal tournament: Africa	1	Ndèye Binta Diongue (SEN)
Zonal tournament: America	1	María Luisa Doig (PER)
Zonal tournament: Europe	1	Pauline Brunner (SUI)
Tripartite Invitation	1	Uwihoreye Tufaha (RWA)
Reallocation of unused quota	1	Ruien Xiao (CAN)
Total	36	

=== Women's team épée ===
Standard	Places	Qualified teams
Top four in FIE Official Team Ranking	4	Italy; South Korea; Poland; France
Top team from Africa in positions 5–16	1	Egypt
Top team from Asia & Oceania in positions 5–16	1	China
Top team from America in positions 5–16	1	United States
Top team from Europe in positions 5–16	1	Ukraine
Host country option	0	—
Total	8	

=== Women's foil ===
Standard	Places	Qualified fencer
Qualified team members	24	Arianna Errigo (ITA); Martina Favaretto (ITA); Alice Volpi (ITA); Jackie Dubrovich (USA); Lee Kiefer (USA); Lauren Scruggs (USA); Ysaora Thibus (FRA); Pauline Ranvier (FRA); Eva Lacheray (FRA); Sera Azuma (JPN); Yuka Ueno (JPN); Karin Miyawaki (JPN); Jessica Guo (CAN); Eleanor Harvey (CAN); Yunjia Zhang (CAN); Chen Qingyuan (CHN); Huang Qianqian (CHN); Wang Yuting (CHN); Martyna Jelińska (POL); Hanna Łyczbińska (POL); Julia Walczyk-Klimaszyk (POL); Yara El-Sharkawy (EGY); Sara Amr Hossny (EGY); Malak Hamza (EGY)
Top 2 individual AOR: Asia & Oceania	2	Amita Berthier (SGP); Daphne Chan (HKG)
Top individual AOR: Africa	1	Maxine Esteban (CIV)
Top individual AOR: America	1	Arantxa Inostroza (CHI)
Top 2 individual AOR: Europe	2	Anne Sauer (GER); Flóra Pásztor (HUN)
Zonal tournament: Asia & Oceania	1	Samantha Catantan (PHI)
Zonal tournament: Africa	1	Youssra Zekrani (MAR)
Zonal tournament: America	1	Mariana Pistoia (BRA)
Zonal tournament: Europe	1	Mălina Călugăreanu (ROU)
Total	34	

=== Women's team foil ===
Standard	Places	Qualified teams
Top four in FIE Official Team Ranking	4	Italy; United States; France; Japan
Top team from Africa in positions 5–16	1	Egypt
Top team from Asia & Oceania in positions 5–16	1	China
Top team from America in positions 5–16	1	Canada
Top team from Europe in positions 5–16	1	Poland
Host country option	0	—
Total	8	

=== Women's sabre ===
Standard	Places	Qualified fencer
Qualified team members	24	Sara Balzer (FRA); Cécilia Berder (FRA); Manon Brunet (FRA); Anna Márton (HUN); Liza Pusztai (HUN); Luca Szűcs (HUN); Choi Se-bin (KOR); Jeon Ha-young (KOR); Yoon Ji-su (KOR); Olga Kharlan (UKR); Alina Komashchuk (UKR); Olena Kravatska (UKR); Tatiana Nazlymov (USA); Magda Skarbonkiewicz (USA); Elizabeth Tartakovsky (USA); Michela Battiston (ITA); Martina Criscio (ITA); Chiara Mormile (ITA); Misaki Emura (JPN); Risa Takashima (JPN); Shihomi Fukushima (JPN); Kaouther Mohamed Belkebir (ALG); Saoussen Boudiaf (ALG); Zohra Nora Kehli (ALG)
Top 2 individual AOR: Asia & Oceania	2	Yang Hengyu (CHN); Zaynab Dayibekova (UZB)
Top individual AOR: Africa	1	Nada Hafez (EGY)
Top individual AOR: America	1	Pamela Brind'Amour (CAN)
Top 2 individual AOR: Europe	2	Theodora Gkountoura (GRE); Lucía Martín-Portugués (ESP)
Zonal tournament: Asia & Oceania	1	Aigerim Sarybay (KAZ)
Zonal tournament: Africa	1	Yasmine Daghfous (TUN)
Zonal tournament: America	1	Katherine Paredes (VEN)
Zonal tournament: Europe	1	Yoana Ilieva (BUL)
Re-allocation of unused quota	2	Anna Bashta (AZE); Nisanur Erbil (TUR)
Total	36	

=== Women's team sabre ===
Standard	Places	Qualified teams
Top four in FIE Official Team Ranking	4	France; Hungary; South Korea; Ukraine
Top team from Africa in positions 5–16	1	Algeria
Top team from Asia & Oceania in positions 5–16	1	Japan
Top team from America in positions 5–16	1	United States
Top team from Europe in positions 5–16	1	Italy
Host country option	0	—
Total	8	

== Olga Kharlan qualification in women's sabre ==
Since July 1, 2020 (and reconfirmed by Fédération Internationale d'Escrime (FIE) public notice in September 2020 and in January 2021), by public written notice the FIE had replaced its previous handshake requirement with a "salute" by the opposing fencers, and written in its public notice that handshakes were "suspended until further notice." Nevertheless, in July 2023 Ukrainian four-time world fencing individual sabre champion Olga Kharlan was disqualified at the World Fencing Championships by the Fédération Internationale d'Escrime for not shaking the hand of her defeated Russian opponent, though Kharlan instead offered a tapping of blades in acknowledgement. Thomas Bach stepped in the next day. As President of the International Olympic Committee (IOC), he sent a letter to Kharlan in which he expressed empathy for her, and wrote that in light of the situation she was being guaranteed a spot in the 2024 Summer Olympics. He wrote further: "as a fellow fencer, it is impossible for me to imagine how you feel at this moment. The war against your country, the suffering of the people in Ukraine, the uncertainty around your participation at the Fencing World Championships ... and then the events which unfolded yesterday – all this is a roller coaster of emotions and feelings. It is admirable how you are managing this incredibly difficult situation, and I would like to express my full support to you. Rest assured that the IOC will continue to stand in full solidarity with the Ukrainian athletes and the Olympic community of Ukraine."
