= Women's sabre at the 2023 World Fencing Championships =

- Venue: Milan Convention Center
- Location: Milan, Italy
- Dates: 24 July (qualification); 27 July (final)

Medalists
gold medal	Misaki Emura	Japan
silver medal	Despina Georgiadou	Greece
bronze medal	Theodora Gkountoura	Greece
bronze medal	Yoana Ilieva	Bulgaria

The Women's sabre competition at the 2023 World Fencing Championships was held on 27 July 2023. The qualification was held on 24 July.

== Draw ==
=== Finals ===
Semifinals
(Japan) Misaki Emura	15
(Greece) Theodora Gkountoura	14
(Greece) Despina Georgiadou	15
(Bulgaria) Yoana Ilieva	8

Final
(Japan) Misaki Emura	15
(Greece) Despina Georgiadou	11

=== Top half ===
==== Section 1 ====
Round of 64
(Japan) Misaki Emura	15
(Uzbekistan) Gulistan Perdibaeva	9
(Italy) Chiara Mormile	12
(Japan) Risa Takashima	15
(Poland) Sylwia Matuszak	15
(Bulgaria) Olga Hramova	10
(Japan) Shihomi Fukushima	9
(France) Caroline Queroli	15
(Spain) Araceli Navarro	15
(Singapore) Juliet Heng	8
(United Kingdom) Caitlin Maxwell	15
(Canada) Tamar Gordon	12
(Mexico) Julieta Todleo	11
(Turkey) Nisanur Erbil	15
(Spain) Celia Pérez	12
(Italy) Martina Criscio	15

Round of 32
(Japan) Misaki Emura	15
(Japan) Risa Takashima	7
(Poland) Sylwia Matuszak	15
(France) Caroline Queroli	11
(Spain) Araceli Navarro	14
(United Kingdom) Caitlin Maxwell	15
(Turkey) Nisanur Erbil	13
(Italy) Martina Criscio	15

Round of 16
(Japan) Misaki Emura	15
(Poland) Sylwia Matuszak	5
(United Kingdom) Caitlin Maxwell	12
(Italy) Martina Criscio	15

Quarterfinals
(Japan) Misaki Emura	15
(Italy) Martina Criscio	8

==== Section 2 ====
Round of 64
(France) Manon Brunet	15
(Georgia (country)) Alexandra Kuvaeva	6
(Poland) Zuzanna Cieślar	10
(Hungary) Liza Pusztai	15
(Italy) Rossella Gregorio	15
(Hong Kong) Laren Leung	10
(Greece) Marina Paizi	13
(United States) Elizabeth Tartakovsky	15
(United States) Magda Skarbonkiewicz	15
(Hong Kong) Chu Wing Kiu	7
(Hong Kong) Au Sin Ying	10
(Germany) Larissa Eifler	15
(China) Zhang Xinyi	14
(Georgia (country)) Lika Jijieishvili	15
(Brazil) Luana Pekelman	6
(Greece) Theodora Gkountoura	15

Round of 32
(France) Manon Brunet	15
(Hungary) Liza Pusztai	8
(Italy) Rossella Gregorio	15
(United States) Elizabeth Tartakovsky	10
(United States) Magda Skarbonkiewicz	12
(Germany) Larissa Eifler	15
(Georgia (country)) Lika Jijieishvili	4
(Greece) Theodora Gkountoura	15

Round of 16
(France) Manon Brunet	15
(Italy) Rossella Gregorio	10
(Germany) Larissa Eifler	6
(Greece) Theodora Gkountoura	15

Quarterfinals
(France) Manon Brunet	11
(Greece) Theodora Gkountoura	15

=== Bottom half ===
==== Section 3 ====
Round of 64
(Greece) Despina Georgiadou	15
(Turkey) Deniz Selin Ünlüdağ	13
(Hungary) Sugár Katinka Battai	9
(Germany) Julika Funke	15
(Poland) Małgorzata Kozaczuk	12
(South Korea) Yoon Ji-su	15
(Germany) Lisa Gette	15
(Hungary) Anna Márton	13
(Italy) Michela Battiston	15
(Kazakhstan) Anastassiya Gulik	5
(Japan) Seri Ozaki	14
(China) Yang Hengyu	15
(South Korea) Jeon Ha-young	15
(United States) Tatiana Nazlymov	10
(Bulgaria) Kalina Atanasova	14
(Spain) Lucía Martín-Portugués	15

Round of 32
(Greece) Despina Georgiadou	15
(Germany) Julika Funke	10
(South Korea) Yoon Ji-su	15
(Germany) Lisa Gette	12
(Italy) Michela Battiston	14
(China) Yang Hengyu	15
(South Korea) Jeon Ha-young	15
(Spain) Lucía Martín-Portugués	9

Round of 16
(Greece) Despina Georgiadou	15
(South Korea) Yoon Ji-su	7
(China) Yang Hengyu	15
(South Korea) Jeon Ha-young	13

Quarterfinals
(Greece) Despina Georgiadou	15
(China) Yang Hengyu	9

==== Section 4 ====
Round of 64
(Azerbaijan) Anna Bashta	15
(India) C. A. Bhavani Devi	13
(South Korea) Jeon Eun-hye	12
(United States) Maia Chamberlain	15
(Bulgaria) Yoana Ilieva	15
(Romania) Sabina Martiș	12
Anna Smirnova	7
(Ukraine) Olha Kharlan	15
(China) Shao Yaqi	15
(Hungary) Luca Szűcs	14
(Kazakhstan) Tatyana Prikhodko	9
(Kazakhstan) Aigerim Sarybay	15
(South Korea) Choi Se-bin	15
(United Kingdom) Maria Chart	10
(Australia) Veronika Vasileva	4
(France) Sara Balzer	15

Round of 32
(Azerbaijan) Anna Bashta	15
(United States) Maia Chamberlain	6
(Bulgaria) Yoana Ilieva	w/o
(Ukraine) Olha Kharlan	DSQ
(China) Shao Yaqi	15
(Kazakhstan) Aigerim Sarybay	7
(South Korea) Choi Se-bin	11
(France) Sara Balzer	15

Round of 16
(Azerbaijan) Anna Bashta	8
(Bulgaria) Yoana Ilieva	15
(China) Shao Yaqi	9
(France) Sara Balzer	15

Quarterfinals
(Bulgaria) Yoana Ilieva	15
(France) Sara Balzer	9
