= 2023–24 Fencing World Cup =

International fencing competition

- Edition: 53rd Fencing World Cup
- Duration: September 2023 – August 2024
- Organiser: FIE

The 53rd FIE Fencing World Cup events began in September 2023 and concluded in August 2024 at the 2024 Summer Olympics held in Paris.

== Individual épée ==
=== Men's épée ===
Color key

- Olympics
- Zone Championships
- Grand Prix
- World Cup
- Satellite

Date	Event	Type	Gold	Silver	Bronze
24 September 2023	Tournoi satellite, Belgrade	Satellite	Tristan Tulen (NED)	Rafael Tulen (NED)	Yordan Galabov (BUL); Georgii Javakhishvili (GEO)
30 September 2023	Tournoi satellite, Geneve	Satellite	Lucas Malcotti (SUI)	Max Heinzer (SUI)	Ian Hauri (SUI); Patrick Jørgensen (DEN)
7 October 2023	Tournoi satellite, Lima	Satellite	Arturo Isaac Dorati Ameglio (PAN)	Pablo Florido (MEX)	Julian Spier (USA); Sanil Sharma (ISV)
14 October 2023	Tournoi satellite, Split	Satellite	Daniel De Mola (ITA)	Maksym Perchuk (UKR)	Francisco Limardo (VEN); Andrea Vallosio (ITA)
11 November 2023	Coupe du Monde, Bern	World Cup	Lucas Malcotti (SUI)	Alexis Bayard (SUI)	Máté Tamás Koch (HUN); Masaru Yamada (JPN)
9 December 2023	Coupe du Monde, Vancouver	World Cup	Luidgi Midelton (FRA)	Wang Zijie (CHN)	Giulio Gaetani (ITA); Koki Kano (JPN)
31 January 2024	Grand Prix du Qatar, Doha	Grand Prix	Yuval Freilich (ISR)	Federico Vismara (ITA)	Samuel Imrek (USA); Yeisser Ramirez (USA)
23 February 2024	Coupe du Monde, Heidenheim an der Brenz	World Cup	Masaru Yamada (JPN)	Enrico Piatti (ITA)	Paul Allegre (FRA); Federico Vismara (ITA)
10 March 2024	WESTEND Grand Prix, Budapest	Grand Prix	Yannick Borel (FRA)	Gergely Siklósi (HUN)	Máté Tamás Koch (HUN); Kweon Young-jun (KOR)
23 March 2024	Coupe du Monde, Tbilisi	World Cup	Romain Cannone (FRA)	Neisser Loyola (BEL)	Alexandre Bardenet (FRA); Dávid Nagy (HUN)
5 May 2024	Epee Grand Prix, Cali	Grand Prix	Koki Kano (JPN)	Gergely Siklósi (HUN)	Máté Tamás Koch (HUN); Mohamed Nada Saleh (EGY)
18 May 2024	Challenge MONAL, Saint-Maur-des-Fossés	World Cup	Gergely Siklósi (HUN)	Masaru Yamada (JPN)	Davide Di Veroli (ITA); Wang Zijie (CHN)
6 June 2024	African Championships, Casablanca	Zone Championships	Mohamed, Elsayed (EGY)	Elkord, Houssam (MAR)	Yasseen, Mohamed (EGY) Beugre, Bedi Paul Alex (CIV)
18 June 2024	European Championships, Basel	Zone Championships	Midelton, Luidgi (FRA)	Siklosi, Gergely (HUN)	Hauri, Ian (SUI) Andrasfi, Tibor (HUN)
22 June 2024	Asian Championships Kuwait	Zone Championships	Ho Wai, Hang (HKG)	Ng Ho, Tin (HKG)	Komata, Akira (JPN) Sertay, Yerlik (KAZ)
26 June 2024	Pan American Championships, Lima	Zone Championships	Samuel Imrek (USA)	Kruz Schembri (ISV)	Fynn Fafard (CAN); Jesus Limardo (VEN)
27 July 2024	Olympic Games, Paris	Olympics	Koki Kano (JPN)	Yannick Borel (FRA)	Mohamed El-Sayed (EGY)

=== Women's épée ===
Color key

- Olympics
- Zone Championships
- Grand Prix
- World Cup
- Satellite

Date	Event	Type	Gold	Silver	Bronze
24 September 2023	Tournoi satellite, Belgrade	Satellite	María Luisa Doig Calderón (PER)	Emma Fransson (SWE)	Alexandra Predescu (ROU); Alexandra Powell (GBR)
1 October 2023	Tournoi satellite, Geneve	Satellite	Vlada Kharkova (UKR)	Olena Kryvytska (UKR)	Katrina Lehis (EST); Leonora MacKinnon (CAN)
8 October 2023	Tournoi satellite, Lima	Satellite	Margherita Guzzi Vincenti (USA)	Sheila Liliana Tejeda (MEX)	Yana Botvinnik (ISR); María Luisa Doig Calderón (PER)
15 October 2023	Tournoi satellite, Split	Satellite	Katrina Lehis (EST)	Nelli Differt (EST)	Haruna Baba (JPN); Irina Embrich (EST)
11 November 2023	Coupe du Monde, Legnano	World Cup	Margherita Guzzi Vincenti (USA)	Pauline Brunner (SUI)	Aleksandra Jarecka (POL); Katrina Lehis (EST)
9 December 2023	Coupe du Monde, Vancouver	World Cup	Coraline Vitalis (FRA)	Isabel Di Tella (ARG)	Camille Nabeth (FRA); Xiao Ruien (CAN)
31 January 2024	Grand Prix du Qatar, Doha	Grand Prix	Vivian Kong (HKG)	Giulia Rizzi (ITA)	Hadley Husisian (USA); Darja Varfolomyeyeva (UKR)
10 February 2024	Coupe du Monde, Barcelona	World Cup	Vivian Kong (HKG)	Song Sera (KOR)	Renata Knapik-Miazga (POL); Eszter Muhari (HUN)
10 March 2024	WESTEND Grand Prix, Budapest	Grand Prix	Anna Kun (HUN)	Eszter Muhari (HUN)	Marie-Florence Candassamy (FRA); Nathalie Moellhausen (BRA)
23 March 2024	Coupe du Monde, Nanjing	World Cup	Giulia Rizzi (ITA)	Song Se-ra (KOR)	Alberta Santuccio (ITA); Martyna Swatowska-Wenglarczyk (POL)
5 May 2024	Epee Grand Prix, Cali	Grand Prix	Auriane Mallo (FRA)	Giulia Rizzi (ITA)	Federica Isola (ITA); Nathalie Moellhausen (BRA)
18 May 2024	Coupe du Monde, Fujairah	World Cup	Kong, Man Wai Vivian (HKG)	Brunner, Pauliine (SUI)	Mallo-Breton, Auriane (FRA) Santuccio, Alberta (ITA)
6 June 2024	African Championships, Casablanca	Zone Championships	Ndolo, Alexandra (KEN)	El Kord, Camilia (MAR)	Gaber, Shirwit (EGY) Hussein, Aya (EGY)
18 June 2024	European Championships, Basel	Zone Championships	Embrich, Irina (EST)	Mallo-Breton, Auriane (FRA)	Santuiccio, Alberta (ITA) Favre, Angeline (SUI)
22 June 2024	Asian Championships, Kuwait	Zone Championships	Yu, Sihan (CHN)	Sun, Yiwen (CHN)	Kang, Young Mi (KOR) Song, Sera (KOR)
25 June 2024	Pan American Championships, Lima	Zone Championships	Margherita Guzzi Vincenti (USA)	Hadley Husisian (USA)	Montserrat Viveros (PAR); Anne Cebula (USA)
27 July 2024	Olympic Games, Paris	Olympics	Vivian Kong (HK)	Auriane Mallo-Breton (FRA)	Eszter Muhari (HUN)

== Individual foil ==
=== Men's foil ===
Color key

- Olympics
- Zone Championships
- Grand Prix
- World Cup
- Satellite

Date	Event	Type	Gold	Silver	Bronze
2 September 2023	Tournoi satellite, São Paulo	Satellite	Leopoldo Alarcon (CHI)	Guilherme Toldo (BRA)	Kamal Minott (GBR); Lorenzo Mion (BRA)
9 September 2023	Tournoi satellite, Singapore	Satellite	Yeung Chi Ka (HKG)	Alexander Kahl (GER)	Chen Chih-chieh (TPE); Lam Ho Long (HKG)
17 September 2023	Tournoi satellite, Monterrey	Satellite	Diego Cervantes (MEX)	Tommaso Archilei (MEX)	Klod Yunes (UKR); Guilherme Toldo (BRA)
23 September 2023	Tournoi satellite, Timișoara	Satellite	Veljko Cuk (SRB)	Carlos Llavador (ESP)	David Sosnov (GBR); Petar Files (CRO)
30 September 2023	Tournoi satellite, Amsterdam	Satellite	Chase Emmer (USA)	Alessandro Stella (ITA)	Ethan Gassner (USA); Damiano Rosatelli (ITA)
14 October 2023	Tournoi satellite, Tashkent	Satellite	Borna Spoljar (CRO)	Kamal Minott (GBR)	Remi Brunner (SUI); Salim Heroui (ALG)
21 October 2023	Tournoi satellite, Zagreb	Satellite	Alexander Choupenitch (CZE)	Andrzej Rządkowski (POL)	Lorenzo Nista (ITA); Leszek Rajski (POL)
28 October 2023	Tournoi satellite, Barcelona	Satellite	Carlos Llavador (ESP)	Kristjan Archer (GBR)	Petar Files (CRO); Gergő Szemes (HUN)
10 November 2023	Coupe du Monde, Istanbul	World Cup	Alexander Massialas (USA)	Cheung Ka Long (HKG)	Giorgio Avola (ITA); Giulio Lombardi (ITA)
9 December 2023	Coupe du Monde, Tokoname	World Cup	Alexander Massialas (USA)	Mohamed Hamza (EGY)	Ryan Choi (HKG); Edoardo Luperi (ITA)
11 January 2024	Coupe du Monde, Paris	World Cup	Tommaso Marini (ITA)	Alessio Foconi (ITA)	Guillaume Bianchi (ITA); Filippo Macchi (ITA)
10 February 2024	Grand Prix, Turin	Grand Prix	Cheung Ka Long (HKG)	Alexander Choupenitch (CZE)	Nick Itkin (USA); Enzo Lefort (FRA)
24 February 2024	Coupe du Monde, Cairo	World Cup	Tommaso Marini (ITA)	Edoardo Luperi (ITA)	Dániel Dósa (HUN); Mo Ziwei (CHN)
17 March 2024	Grand Prix, Washington, D.C.	Grand Prix	Nick Itkin (USA)	Enzo Lefort (FRA)	Filippo Macchi (ITA); Kyosuke Matsuyama (JPN)
2 May 2024	Coupe du Monde, Hong Kong	World Cup	Guillaume Bianchi (ITA)	Takahiro Shikine (JPN)	Carlos Llavador (ESP); Tommaso Marini (ITA)
18 May 2024	Grand Prix, Shanghai	Grand Prix	Cheung Ka Long (HKG)	Gerek Meinhardt (USA)	Mohamed Hamza (EGY); Kazuki Iimura (JPN)
6 June 2024	African Championships, Casablanca	Zone Championships	Hamza, Mohamed (EGY)	Tolba, Abdelrahman (EGY)	Abouelkassem, AlaaEldin (EGY) Keryhuel, Jeremy Fafa (CIV)
18 June 2024	European Championships, Basel	Zone Championships	Marini, Tommaso (ITA)	Foconi, Alessio (ITA)	Pauty, Maxime (FRA) Choupenitch, Alexander (CZE)
22 June 2024	Asian Championships, Kuwait	Zone Championships	Matsuyama, Kyosuke (JPN)	Imura, Kazuki (JPN)	Mo, Ziwei (CHN) Shikine, takahiro (JPN)
25 June 2024	Pan American Championships, Lima	Zone Championships	Nick Itkin (USA)	Gerek Meinhardt (USA)	Guilherme Toldo (BRA); Alexander Massialas (USA)
27 July 2024	Olympic Games, Paris	Olympics	Cheung Ka Long (HKG)	Filippo Macchi (ITA)	Nick Itkin (USA)

=== Women's foil ===
Color key

- Olympics
- Zone Championships
- Grand Prix
- World Cup
- Satellite

Date	Event	Type	Gold	Silver	Bronze
3 September 2023	Tournoi satellite, São Paulo	Satellite	Maia Mei Weintraub (USA)	Mariana Pistoia (BRA)	Ana Beatriz Bulcão (BRA); Alely Hernandez (MEX)
10 September 2023	Tournoi satellite, Singapore	Satellite	Valerie Cheng Hiu Wai (HKG)	Umida Ilyosova (UZB)	Maxine Wong Jie Xin (SGP); Sophia Wu (HKG)
24 September 2023	Tournoi satellite, Timișoara	Satellite	Zander Rhodes (USA)	Carlotta Ferrari (ITA)	Alina Poloziuk (UKR); Emilia Corbu (ROU)
1 October 2023	Tournoi satellite, Amsterdam	Satellite	Coralie Brot (FRA)	Maia Mei Weintraub (USA)	Arantza Inostroza (CHI); Olga Sopit (UKR)
15 October 2023	Tournoi satellite, Tashkent	Satellite	Carolina Stutchbury (GBR)	Nok Sze Daphne Chan (HKG)	Lilli Maria Brugger (AUT); Sofiya Aktayeva (KAZ)
22 October 2023	Tournoi satellite, Istanbul	Satellite	Alina Poloziuk (UKR)	Marta Cammilletti (ITA)	Emilia Corbu (ROU); Carolina Stutchbury (GBR)
28 October 2023	Tournoi satellite, Barcelona	Satellite	Kata Kondricz (HUN)	Elisabetta Bianchin (ITA)	Emilia Corbu (ROU); Benedetta Pantanetti (ITA)
9 December 2023	Coupe du Monde, Novi Sad	World Cup	Alice Volpi (ITA)	Lee Kiefer (USA)	Leonie Ebert (GER); Jessica Guo (CAN)
11 January 2024	Coupe du Monde, Paris	World Cup	Chen Qingyuan (CHN)	Elena Tangherlini (ITA)	Martina Favaretto (ITA); Jessica Guo (CAN)
10 February 2024	Grand Prix, Turin	Grand Prix	Lee Kiefer (USA)	Martina Favaretto (ITA)	Arianna Errigo (ITA); Anne Sauer (GER)
24 February 2024	Coupe du Monde, Cairo	World Cup	Martina Favaretto (ITA)	Lee Kiefer (USA)	Jacqueline Dubrovich (USA); Martina Sinigalia (ITA)
17 March 2024	Grand Prix, Washington, D.C.	Grand Prix	Lee Kiefer (USA)	Arianna Errigo (ITA)	Anne Sauer (GER); Lauren Scruggs (USA)
20 April 2024	Coupe du Monde, Tbilisi	World Cup	Alice Volpi (ITA)	Arianna Errigo (ITA)	Anna Cristino (ITA); Martina Favaretto (ITA)
2 May 2024	Coupe du Monde, Hong Kong	World Cup	Maia Mei Weintraub (USA)	Elena Tangherlini (ITA)	Jacqueline Dubrovich (USA); Arianna Errigo (ITA)
18 May 2024	Grand Prix, Shanghai	Grand Prix	Martina Favaretto (ITA)	Julia Klimaszyk (POL)	Lee Kiefer (USA); Pauline Ranvier (FRA)
6 June 2024	African Championships, Casablanca	Zone Championships	Elsharkawy, Yara (EGY)	Esteban, Maxine Isabel (CIV)	Hamza, Malak (EGY) Hany, Noha (EGY)
18 June 2024	European Championships, Basel	Zone Championships	Errigo, Arianna (ITA)	Myroniuk, Dariia (UKR)	Walczyk-Klimaszyk, Julia (POL) Strutchbury, Carolina (GBR)
22 June 2024	Asian Championships, Kuwait	Zone Championships	Yu, sihan (CHN)	Sun, Yiwen (CHN)	Kang, Young Mi (KOR) Song, Sera (KOR)
27 June 2024	Pan American Championships, Lima	Zone Championships	Lee Kiefer (USA)	Eleanor Harvey (CAN)	Jacqueline Dubrovich (USA); Jessica Guo (CAN)
27 July 2024	Olympic Games, Paris	Olympics	Lee Kiefer (USA)	Lauren Scruggs (USA)	Eleanor Harvey (CAN)

== Individual sabre ==
=== Men's sabre ===
Color key

- Olympics
- Zone Championships
- Grand Prix
- World Cup
- Satellite

Date	Event	Type	Gold	Silver	Bronze
10 September 2023	Tournoi satellite, Isfahan	Satellite	Mohammad Rahbari (IRI)	Farzad Baher (IRI)	Mohammad Fotouhi (IRI); Ali Pakdaman (IRI)
23 September 2023	Tournoi satellite, Sofia	Satellite	Krisztián Rabb (HUN)	Tolga Aslan (TUR)	Eliecer Romero (VEN); Francesco D'Armiento (ITA)
1 October 2023	Tournoi satellite, Ghent	Satellite	Enver Yildirim (TUR)	Leonaro Dreossi (ITA)	Francesco D'Armiento (ITA); Ahmed Ferjani (TUN)
7 October 2023	Tournoi satellite, Kuwait City	Satellite	Yousef Alshamlan (KUW)	Giorgio Marciano (ITA)	Sardor Abdukarimbekov (UZB); Ivan Mandov (BUL)
15 October 2023	Tournoi satellite, Tbilisi	Satellite	Krzysztof Kaczkowski (POL)	Thomas Martine (FRA)	Enver Yildirim (TUR); Sherzod Mamutov (UZB)
21 October 2023	Tournoi satellite, Istanbul	Satellite	Krisztián Rabb (HUN)	Colin Heathcock (USA)	Pietro Torre (ITA); Furkan Yaman (TUR)
29 October 2023	Tournoi satellite, Baghdad	Satellite	Artyom Sarkissyan (KAZ)	Ivan Mandov (BUL)	Todor Stoychev (BUL); Osama Almasri (JOR)
10 November 2023	Coupe du Monde, Algiers	World Cup	Boladé Apithy (FRA)	Oh Sang-uk (KOR)	Áron Szilágyi (HUN); Pietro Torre (ITA)
9 December 2023	GRAND PRIX NUOMA, Orléans	Grand Prix	Matyas Szabo (GER)	Maxime Pianfetti (FRA)	Sebastien Patrice (FRA); Pietro Torre (ITA)
14 January 2024	Grand Prix, Tunis	Grand Prix	Colin Heathcock (USA)	Fares Ferjani (TUN)	Sandro Bazadze (GEO); Áron Szilágyi (HUN)
10 February 2024	Coupe du Monde, Tbilisi	World Cup	Áron Szilágyi (HUN)	Ali Pakdaman (IRI)	Sandro Bazadze (GEO); Luigi Samele (ITA)
2 March 2024	Trophée Luxardo, Padua	World Cup	Colin Heathcock (USA)	Luigi Samele (ITA)	Santiago Madrigal (ESP); Ziad Elsissy (EGY)
23 March 2024	Coupe du Monde, Budapest	World Cup	András Szatmári (HUN)	Luca Curatoli (ITA)	Ali Pakdaman (IRN); Enver Yıldırım (TUR)
6 May 2024	Grand Prix, Seoul	Grand Prix	Ziad Elsissy (EGY)	Sandro Bazadze (GEO)	Filip Dolegiewicz (USA); Colin Heathcock (USA)
18 May 2024	Villa de Madrid, Madrid	World Cup	Sebastien Patrice (FRA)	Ha Han-sol (KOR)	William Morrill (USA); Matteo Neri (ITA)
6 June 2024	African Championships, Casablanca	Zone Championships	Amer, Mohamed (EGY)	Moataz, Adham (EGY)	Elissy, Ziad (EGY) Girault, Evann Jean Abba (NIG)
18 June 2024	European Championships, Basel	Zone Championships	Gallo, Michele (ITA)	Curatoli, Luca (ITA)	Samele, Luigi (ITA) Patrice, Jean-Philippe (FRA)
22 June 2024	Asian Championships, Kuwait	Zone Championships	Oh, Sanguk (KOR)	Shen, Chenpeng (CHN)	Alshamlan, Yousef (KUW) Rahbari, Mohammad (IRI)
27 June 2024	Pan American Championships, Lima	Zone Championships	Eli Dershwitz (USA)	Mitchell Saron (USA)	Fares Arfa (CAN); Olivier Desrosiers (CAN)
27 July 2024	Olympic Games, Paris	Olympics	Oh Sang-uk (KOR)	Farès Ferjani (TUN)	Luigi Samele (ITA)

=== Women's sabre ===
Color key

- Olympics
- Zone Championships
- Grand Prix
- World Cup
- Satellite

Date	Event	Type	Gold	Silver	Bronze
24 September 2023	Tournoi satellite, Sofia	Satellite	Anna Bashta (AZE)	Yoana Ilieva (BUL)	Palina Kaspiarovich (AZE); Olga A. Hramova (BUL)
1 October 2023	Tournoi satellite, Ghent	Satellite	Anna Bashta (AZE)	Despina Georgiadou (GRE)	Manon Brunet (FRA); Caitlin Maxwell (GBR)
15 October 2023	Tournoi satellite, Tbilisi	Satellite	Despina Georgiadou (GRE)	Lika Jijieishvili (GEO)	Palina Kaspiarovich (AZE); C. A. Bhavani Devi (IND)
21 October 2023	Tournoi satellite, Istanbul	Satellite	Olga Kharlan (UKR)	Alina Komashchuk (UKR)	Lika Jijieishvili (GEO); Anna Bashta (AZE)
11 November 2023	Coupe du Monde, Algiers	World Cup	Sara Balzer (FRA)	Olga Kharlan (UKR)	Despina Georgiadou (GRE); Theodora Gkountoura (GRE)
9 December 2023	GRAND PRIX NUOMA, Orléans	Grand Prix	Manon Brunet (FRA)	Olga Kharlan (UKR)	Sara Balzer (FRA); Cecilia Berder (FRA)
14 January 2024	Grand Prix, Tunis	Grand Prix	Lucia Martin-Portugues (ESP)	Nisanur Erbil (TUR)	Choi Se-bin (KOR); Chiara Mormile (ITA)
10 February 2024	Coupe du Monde, Lima	World Cup	Olga Kharlan (UKR)	Sugár Katinka Battai (HUN)	Zaynab Dayibekova (UZB); Elizabeth Tartakovsky (USA)
2 March 2024	Coupe du Monde, Athens	World Cup	Sara Balzer (FRA)	Lucía Martín-Portugués (ESP)	Manon Brunet (FRA); Olga Kharlan (UKR)
16 March 2024	Coupe du Monde, Sint-Niklaas	World Cup	Sara Balzer (FRA)	Misaki Emura (JPN)	Martina Criscio (ITA); Theodora Gkountoura (GRE)
6 May 2024	Grand Prix, Seoul	Grand Prix	Navarro, Araceli (ESP)	Noutcha, Sara (FRA)	Balzer, Sara (FRA) Martin-Portugues, Lucia (ESP)
18 May 2024	Coupe du Monde, Plovdiv	World Cup	Balzer, Sara (FRA)	Kharlan, Olga (UKR)	Emura, MIsaki (JPN) Georgiadou, Despina (JPN)
6 June 2024	African Championships, Casablanca	Zone Championships	Essomba, Lorina (CMR)	Nofal, Nagwa (EGY)	Eldoksh, Renad (EGY) Hafez, Nada (EGY)
18 June 2024	European Championships, Basel	Zone Championships	Perez Cuenca, Celia (ESP)	Pusztai, Liza (HUN)	Navarro, Araceli (ESP) Cieslar, Zuzanna (POL)
22 June 2024	Asian Championships, Kuwait	Zone Championships	Emura, Misaki (JPN)	Yoon, Jisu (KOR)	Ozaki, Seri (JPN) Jeon, Hayoung (KOR)
26 June 2024	Pan American Championships, Lima	Zone Championships	Elizabeth Tartakovsky (USA)	Maia Chamberlain (USA)	Pamela Brind'amour (CAN); Tatiana Nazlymov (USA)
27 July 2024	Olympic Games, Paris	Olympics	Manon Apithy-Brunet (FRA)	Sara Balzer (FRA)	Olga Kharlan (UKR)
