= Fencing at the 2024 Summer Olympics – Women's sabre =

Women's sabre at the Games of the XXXIII Olympiad
- Olympic fencing
- Venue: Grand Palais strip
- Date: 29 July 2024
- Competitors: 36 from 20 nations

Medalists
1st place, gold medalist(s)		Manon Brunet	France
2nd place, silver medalist(s)		Sara Balzer	France
3rd place, bronze medalist(s)		Olga Kharlan	Ukraine

The women's sabre event at the 2024 Summer Olympics took place on 29 July 2024 at the Grand Palais strip.

== Background ==
This was the sixth appearance of the event, which has been held at every Summer Olympics since being introduced in 2004.

== Competition format ==
The 1996 tournament had vastly simplified the competition format into a single-elimination bracket, with a bronze medal match. The 2024 tournament continued to use that format. Fencing was done to 15 touches or to the completion of three three-minute rounds if neither fencer reaches 15 touches by then. At the end of time, the higher-scoring fencer was the winner; a tie resulted in an additional one-minute sudden-death time period. This sudden-death period was further modified by the selection of a draw-winner beforehand; if neither fencer scored a touch during the minute, the predetermined draw-winner won the bout. Standard sabre rules regarding target area, striking, and priority were used.

== Schedule ==
The competition was held over a single day, Monday, 29 July. Men's sabre bouts alternate with the men's foil event bouts.

All times use Central European Summer Time (UTC+2)

Date	Time	Round
Monday, 29 July 2024	09:00; 10:25; 14:05; 15:55; 19:00; 20:50	Round of 64; Round of 32; Round of 16; Quarterfinals; Semifinals; Finals

== Results ==
=== Finals ===
Semifinals
Sara Balzer (FRA)	15
Olga Kharlan (UKR)	7
Manon Brunet (FRA)	15
Choi Se-bin (KOR)	12

Final
Sara Balzer (FRA)	12
Manon Brunet (FRA)	15
Bronze medal bout
Olga Kharlan (UKR)	15
Choi Se-bin (KOR)	14

=== Top half ===
==== Section 1 ====
Round of 64
Zohra Nora Kehli (ALG)	12
Yasmine Daghfous (TUN)	15

Round of 32
Sara Balzer (FRA)	15
Yasmine Daghfous (TUN)	9
Magda Skarbonkiewicz (USA)	11
Nisanur Erbil (TUR)	15
Martina Criscio (ITA)	10
Luca Szűcs (HUN)	15
Risa Takashima (JPN)	10
Yoana Ilieva (BUL)	15

Round of 16
Sara Balzer (FRA)	15
Nisanur Erbil (TUR)	5
Luca Szűcs (HUN)	15
Yoana Ilieva (BUL)	10

Quarterfinals
Sara Balzer (FRA)	15
Luca Szűcs (HUN)	12

==== Section 2 ====
Round of 64
Anna Márton (HUN)	15
Khaterine Paredes (VEN)	10

Round of 32
Olga Kharlan (UKR)	15
Shihomi Fukushima (JPN)	9
Anna Bashta (AZE)	15
Yang Hengyu (CHN)	9
Liza Pusztai (HUN)	15
Michela Battiston (ITA)	12
Anna Márton (HUN)	15
Lucía Martín-Portugués (ESP)	8

Round of 16
Olga Kharlan (UKR)	15
Anna Bashta (AZE)	6
Liza Pusztai (HUN)	7
Anna Márton (HUN)	15

Quarterfinals
Olga Kharlan (UKR)	15
Anna Márton (HUN)	7

=== Bottom half ===
==== Section 3 ====
Round of 64
Chaima Benadouda (ALG)	9
Aigerim Sarybay (KAZ)	15

Round of 32
Manon Brunet (FRA)	15
Aigerim Sarybay (KAZ)	12
Zaynab Dayibekova (UZB)	11
Yoon Ji-su (KOR)	15
Cécilia Berder (FRA)	15
Chiara Mormile (ITA)	10
Pamela Brind'Amour (CAN)	3
Theodora Gkountoura (GRE)	15

Round of 16
Manon Brunet (FRA)	15
Yoon Ji-su (KOR)	9
Cécilia Berder (FRA)	7
Theodora Gkountoura (GRE)	15

Quarterfinals
Manon Brunet (FRA)	15
Theodora Gkountoura (GRE)	13

==== Section 4 ====
Round of 64
Saoussen Boudiaf (ALG)	8
Olena Kravatska (UKR)	15

Round of 32
Elizabeth Tartakovsky (USA)	13
Nada Hafez (EGY)	15
Alina Komashchuk (UKR)	8
Jeon Ha-young (KOR)	15
Tatiana Nazlymov (USA)	14
Choi Se-bin (KOR)	15
Olena Kravatska (UKR)	14
Misaki Emura (JPN)	15

Round of 16
Nada Hafez (EGY)	7
Jeon Ha-young (KOR)	15
Choi Se-bin (KOR)	15
Misaki Emura (JPN)	7

Quarterfinals
Jeon Ha-young (KOR)	14
Choi Se-bin (KOR)	15
