= Women's sabre at the 2022 World Fencing Championships =

- Venue: Cairo Stadium Indoor Halls Complex
- Location: Cairo, Egypt
- Dates: 17 July (qualification); 20 July
- Competitors: 133 from 46 nations

Medalists
| gold medal | Misaki Emura | Japan |
| silver medal | Anna Bashta | Azerbaijan |
| bronze medal | Araceli Navarro | Spain |
| bronze medal | Despina Georgiadou | Greece |

The Women's sabre competition at the 2022 World Fencing Championships was held on 20 July 2022. The qualification was held on 17 July.

== Draw ==
=== Finals ===
Semifinals
(Japan) Misaki Emura | 15
(Spain) Araceli Navarro | 5
(Greece) Despina Georgiadou | 9
(Azerbaijan) Anna Bashta | 15

Final
(Japan) Misaki Emura | 15
(Azerbaijan) Anna Bashta | 10

=== Top half ===
==== Section 1 ====
Round of 64
(Japan) Misaki Emura | 15
(Germany) Julika Funke | 8
(Romania) Sabina Martiş | 15
(Cuba) Leidis Veranes | 7
(Bulgaria) Yoana Ilieva | 15
(United Kingdom) Caitlin Maxwell | 9
(Brazil) Luana Pekelman | 15
(China) Yang Hengyu | 7
(France) Sara Balzer | 15
(Japan) Kanae Kobayashi | 9
(Romania) Ilinca Pantiş | 14
(Mexico) Julieta Toledo | 15
(India) C. A. Bhavani Devi | 15
(Canada) Gabriella Page | 14
(Germany) Larissa Eifler | 15
(Hungary) Liza Pusztai | 10

Round of 32
(Japan) Misaki Emura | 15
(Romania) Sabina Martiş | 11
(Bulgaria) Yoana Ilieva | 15
(Brazil) Luana Pekelman | 6
(France) Sara Balzer | 15
(Mexico) Julieta Toledo | 8
(India) C. A. Bhavani Devi | 12
(Germany) Larissa Eifler | 15

Round of 16
(Japan) Misaki Emura | 15
(Bulgaria) Yoana Ilieva | 12
(France) Sara Balzer | 10
(Germany) Larissa Eifler | 15

Quarterfinals
(Japan) Misaki Emura | 15
(Germany) Larissa Eifler | 10

==== Section 2 ====
Round of 64
(France) Caroline Queroli | 15
(Hong Kong) Chu Wing Kiu | 9
(France) Anne Poupinet | 14
(Hungary) Sugár Katinka Battai | 15
(Spain) Araceli Navarro | 15
(Georgia (country)) Teodora Kakhiani-Meckling | 11
(Azerbaijan) Sabina Karimova | 12
(South Korea) Kim Ji-yeon | 15
(France) Sarah Noutcha | 15
(Spain) Elena Hernández | 14
(Hong Kong) Summer Sit | 2
(Ukraine) Yuliia Bakastova | 15
(United States) Honor Johnson | 15
(Canada) Tamar Gordon | 13
(Kazakhstan) Aigerim Sarybay | 7
(Italy) Rossella Gregorio | 15

Round of 32
(France) Caroline Queroli | 15
(Hungary) Sugár Katinka Battai | 10
(Spain) Araceli Navarro | 15
(South Korea) Kim Ji-yeon | 14
(France) Sarah Noutcha | 15
(Ukraine) Yuliia Bakastova | 5
(United States) Honor Johnson | 12
(Italy) Rossella Gregorio | 15

Round of 16
(France) Caroline Queroli | 9
(Spain) Araceli Navarro | 15
(France) Sarah Noutcha | 15
(Italy) Rossella Gregorio | 14

Quarterfinals
(Spain) Araceli Navarro | 15
(France) Sarah Noutcha | 5

=== Bottom half ===
==== Section 3 ====
Round of 64
(Greece) Despina Georgiadou | 15
(Singapore) Nicole Wee | 1
(Uzbekistan) Zaynab Dayibekova | 14
(Italy) Michela Battiston | 15
(Poland) Sylwia Matuszak | 10
(Bulgaria) Olga Hramova | 15
(Uzbekistan) Paola Pliego | 14
(United States) Anne-Elizabeth Stone | 15
(Spain) Lucía Martín-Portugués | 15
(Hungary) Renáta Katona | 13
(Algeria) Saoussen Boudiaf | 10
(Japan) Shihomi Fukushima | 15
(Algeria) Zohra Nora Kehli | 13
(Poland) Malgorzata Kozaczuk | 15
(Germany) Elisabeth Gette | 12
(South Korea) Choi Soo-yeon | 15

Round of 32
(Greece) Despina Georgiadou | 15
(Italy) Michela Battiston | 5
(Bulgaria) Olga Hramova | 14
(United States) Anne-Elizabeth Stone | 15
(Spain) Lucía Martín-Portugués | 15
(Japan) Shihomi Fukushima | 8
(Poland) Malgorzata Kozaczuk | 13
(South Korea) Choi Soo-yeon | 15

Round of 16
(Greece) Despina Georgiadou | 15
(United States) Anne-Elizabeth Stone | 9
(Spain) Lucía Martín-Portugués | 15
(South Korea) Choi Soo-yeon | 10

Quarterfinals
(Greece) Despina Georgiadou | 15
(Spain) Lucía Martín-Portugués | 12

==== Section 4 ====
Round of 64
(Greece) Theodora Gkountoura | 15
(Bulgaria) Ana Mihailova | 6
(Bulgaria) Emma Neikova | 14
(Poland) Zuzanna Cieślar | 15
(Italy) Eloisa Passaro | 15
(Azerbaijan) Sevil Bunyatova | 12
(Singapore) Juliet Heng | 15
(South Korea) Yoon Ji-su | 13
(Italy) Martina Criscio | 15
(Ukraine) Olena Kravatska | 10
(United States) Tatiana Nazlymov | 6
(Ukraine) Olha Kharlan | 15
(Canada) Madison Thurgood | 15
(Iran) Faezeh Rafiei | 9
(Dominican Republic) Heyddys Valentín | 9
(Azerbaijan) Anna Bashta | 15

Round of 32
(Greece) Theodora Gkountoura | 15
(Poland) Zuzanna Cieślar | 14
(Italy) Eloisa Passaro | 15
(Singapore) Juliet Heng | 9
(Italy) Martina Criscio | 15
(Ukraine) Olha Kharlan | 14
(Canada) Madison Thurgood | 8
(Azerbaijan) Anna Bashta | 15

Round of 16
(Greece) Theodora Gkountoura | 15
(Italy) Eloisa Passaro | 13
(Italy) Martina Criscio | 6
(Azerbaijan) Anna Bashta | 15

Quarterfinals
(Greece) Theodora Gkountoura | 11
(Azerbaijan) Anna Bashta | 15
