= Tartakovsky (surname) =

Tartakovsky (masculine), Tartakovskaya (feminine) is a Russian-language toponymic surname derived from one of the places named Tartakov or Tartak.

Notable people with the surname include:

- Elizabeth Tartakovsky (born 2000), American Olympic saber fencer
- Genndy Tartakovsky (born 1970), American animator, writer, producer, and director
- Joseph Tartakovsky (born 1981), American lawyer, writer, and historian

== Fictional character ==
- Ruvim Tartakovsky, from Odessa Stories by Isaac Babel

== See also ==
- Tartakover, Jewish surname of the same toponymic origin
