= Leoforos Alexandras Stadium =

Football stadium

- Leoforos Alexandras
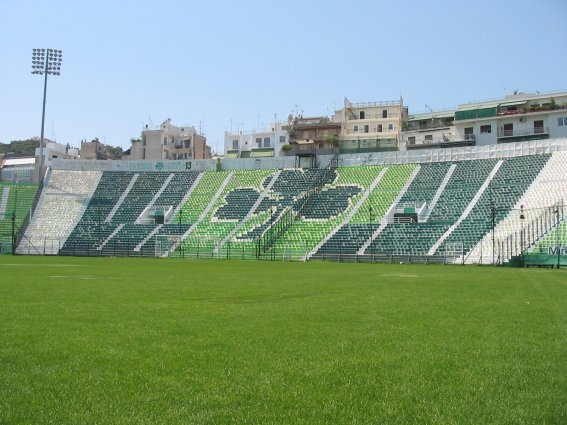
- Interactive map of Leoforos Alexandras Stadium
- Location: 160 Alexandras Avenue, Ampelokipoi, Athens, Greece
- Coordinates: 37°59′14″N 23°45′15″E
- Owner: Panathinaikos AC
- Operator: Panathinaikos AC and Panathinaikos F.C.
- Capacity: 16,003
- Surface: Grass
- Scoreboard: Yes
- Record attendance: 29,667 (Panathinaikos vs Bayern Munich, 18 October 1967)
- Public transit: Ambelokipi metro station

Construction
- Opened: 8 March 1922; 104 years ago
- Renovated: 2001, 2007, 2013
- Cost: €7 million (2001 renovation) €800,000 (2007 renovation) €2 million (2013 renovation)

Tenants
- Panathinaikos WFC (selected matches): Boxing department; Wrestling department; Weightlifting department; Kickboxing department; Shooting department; Archery department; Academies; Other departments occasionally; Kifisia (2026–present); Greece U21 (selected matches); Former tenants: Panathinaikos FC (1922–1984, 2000–2005, 2007–2008, 2013–2018, 2020–2024, 2025–2026): Fencing department; Greece (1929–1970, 1977–1980, 2002–2004); Athinaikos (1990–1994) Athens Kallithea (2024–2025)

Leoforos Alexandras Stadium (Greek: Γήπεδο Λεωφόρου Αλεξάνδρας), also known as Leoforos Stadium or Apostolos Nikolaidis Stadium, is a football stadium and multi-sport center in Athens, Greece. It was inaugurated in 1922 and is the oldest currently active football stadium in Greece. It is the traditional athletic center of Panathinaikos AC and was the home ground of its football department for the most part of the club's existence.

The stadium is named after the historic club's president, official and athlete Apostolos Nikolaidis. It is situated in the Ampelokipoi district of Athens, east of the Lycabettus Hill and on Alexandras Avenue 160, by which name it is most commonly known (Leoforos Alexandras or simply Leoforos, Leoforos meaning Avenue). The stadium's record attendance was recorded in 1967, when 29,665 spectators watched the Cup Winners' Cup game between Panathinaikos and Bayern Munich.

It also houses several other facilities under its stands, including an indoor hall, a small swimming pool, a boxing ring, an indoor shooting range, the club's offices as well as various other facilities.

== History ==
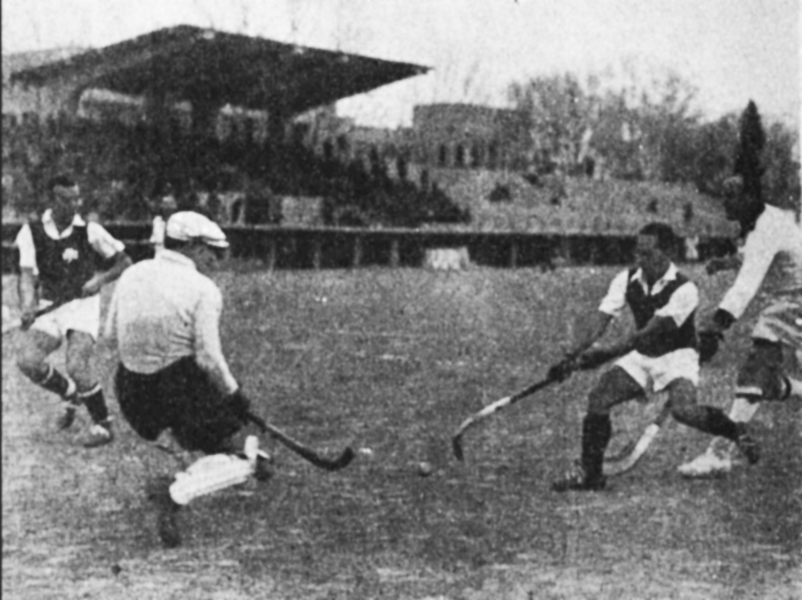
Field hockey in Leoforos, 1927

The construction of the first concrete stand in the Apostolos Nikolaidis Stadium (Leoforos Alexandras) in 1931

Apostolos Nikolaidis Stadium holds a very important place in the history of Greek football. The first stand was built in 1928, during tensions between Panathinaikos fans and refugees from the Greco-Turkish war who had settled in the area (and finally were housed in the neighboring Prosfygika). For almost 50 years the Stadium hosted the majority of big matches in domestic and international competitions. It was the first to have floodlights installed (1938) and the first with a grass pitch (1958). It was the home of Greece for many years.

Panathinaikos left Leoforos in 1984 and moved to the Olympic Stadium. The club returned to their home ground in 2001, following an upgrading that cost €7 million.

In 2007, Panathinaikos decided to reuse Leoforos Alexandras Stadium for the 2007–08 Super League Greece season.

Due to the stadium's old construction, dearth of space and dense urbanization of the area, the club sought to move. Negotiations were under way between the Greek government, the Municipality of Athens, and the football, basketball, volleyball and amateur divisions of the club in order to facilitate the building of a new, comprehensive sports complex to house all of the 21 departments of Panathinaikos elsewhere. Eventually, the industrial Votanikos district was selected among others to house the complex and there were plans for construction to begin in 2008. Athens Mayor Dora Bakoyianni stated that such a project would revitalise the area as well as benefit the club.

In 2012, bureaucracy problems, such as Panathinaikos' and the country's bad financial situation due to the economic crisis, didn’t allow the construction of the new stadium. President Giannis Alafouzos decided to move the team back from the Athens Olympic Stadium to the historical Leoforos Alexandras for the 2013–14 season.

For the 2024–25 season the stadium was used by Athens Kallithea.

== Pavlos and Thanasis Giannakopoulos Indoor Hall ==
Pavlos and Thanasis Giannakopoulos Indoor Hall
- The Indian's Tomb
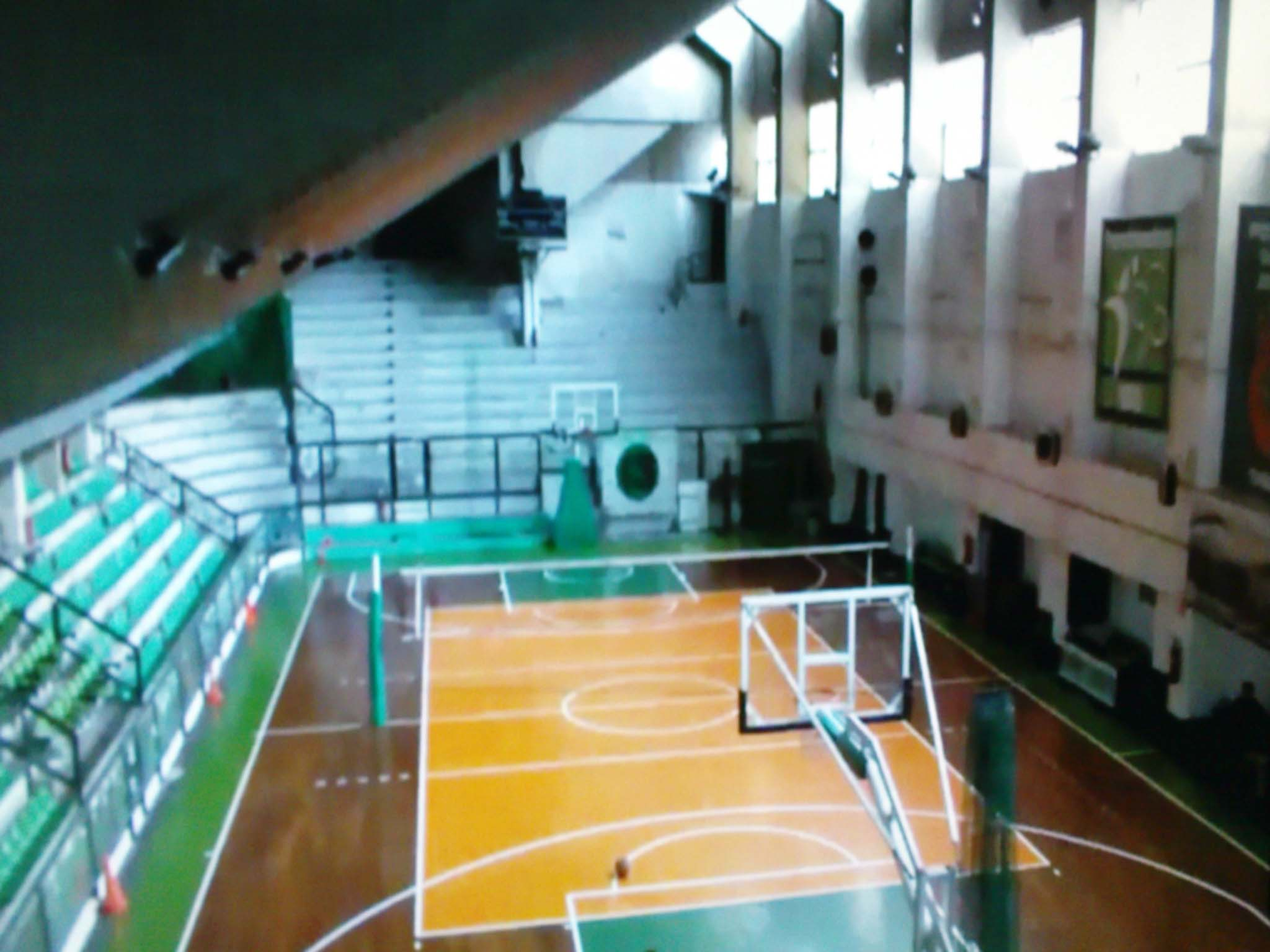
- Interactive map of Pavlos and Thanasis Giannakopoulos Indoor Hall
- Full name: Pavlos and Thanasis Giannakopoulos Indoor Hall
- Location: Ampelokipoi, Athens, Greece
- Owner: Panathinaikos AC
- Capacity: 1,500
- Surface: Parquet

Construction
- Opened: 1960

Tenants
- Panathinaikos women's basketball; Former tenants: Panathinaikos B.C.; Panathinaikos V.C.; Panathinaikos women's volleyball

An indoor hall is located under the East curve of the stadium, below Gates 6 and 7. When it was constructed in 1959, it was the first indoor hall in Greece. It has a capacity of 1,500 and it is famous for the hot atmosphere Panathinaikos fans create in it. During its inauguration ceremony, Tasos Stefanou who was the curator of the Panathinaikos basketball department at the time, mentioned that the gym would create a claustrophobic feeling for the opponents, something that reminded him of the "Indian tomb" pictured on the namesake film by Fritz Lang, that was featured in cinemas during the same time. The comparison was so successful that the nickname "The Indian's Tomb" (pronounced "Tafos tou Indou" in Greek) was immediately adopted and is used until today to informally distinguish the indoor hall from the other facilities of the stadium.

In 2015, the official name of the indoor hall became "Pavlos Giannakopoulos", in honor of the historic former President of Panathinaikos B.C. In 2017, the hall's name was changed to "Pavlos and Thanasis Giannakopoulos", paying tribute to both of the former Presidents of Panathinaikos B.C. and Panathinaikos A.O.

== Other facilities ==
Apart from the football field and the indoor hall, the stadium is also the home ground of the most sport departments of Panathinaikos, such as the rugby, boxing, fencing, archery, table-tennis, wrestling, weightlifting and shooting departments. There are training rooms, boxing ring, swimming pool, such as an official shop of the football team, pressroom and various cafés.

== Gate 13 ==
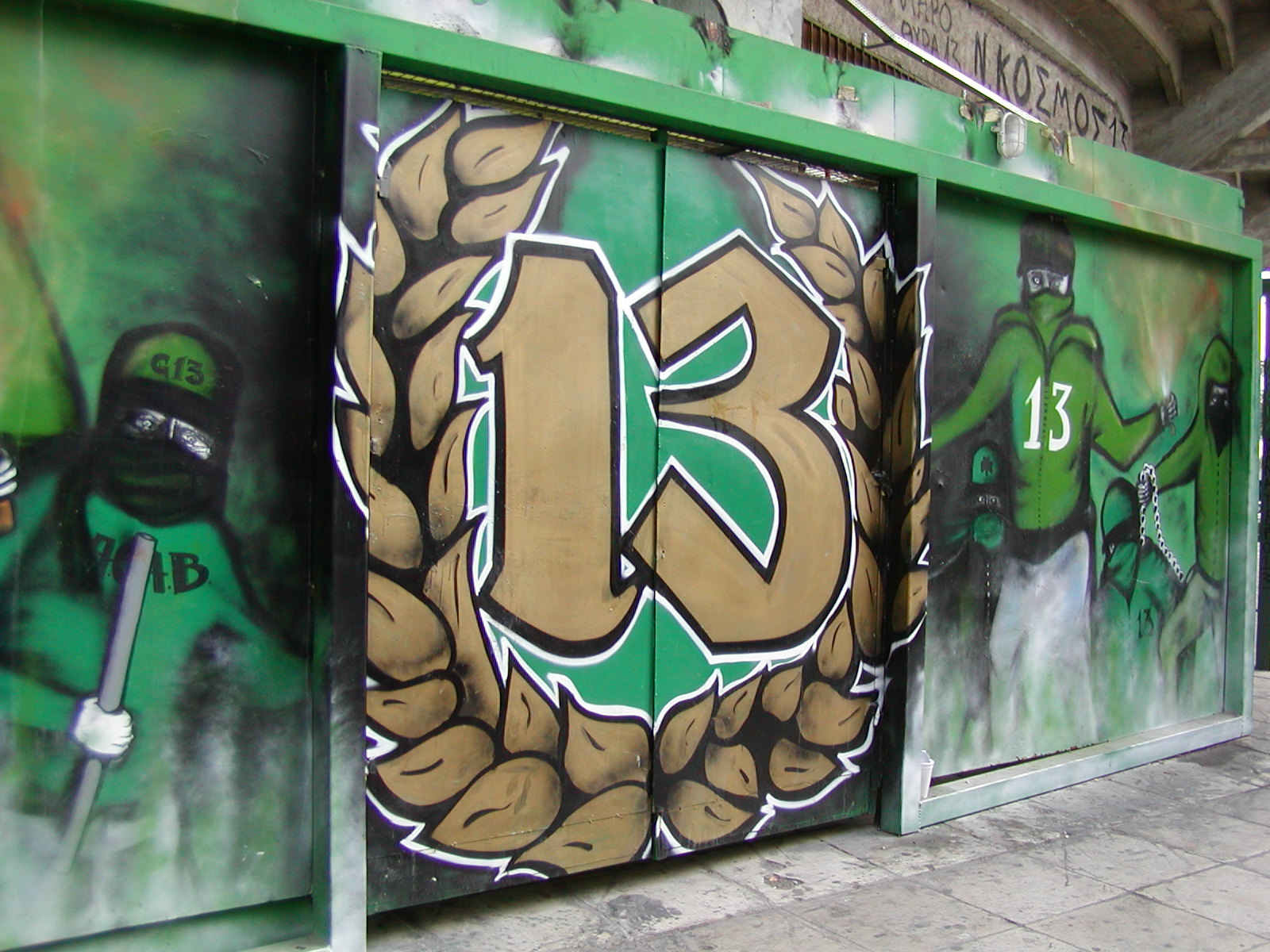
A graffiti of Gate 13

Fan seating in Greece is segregated by team allegiance. Gate 13, the subject of much graffiti in Athens, is where the most enthusiastic supporters of Panathinaikos sit in the stadium.

== Images ==
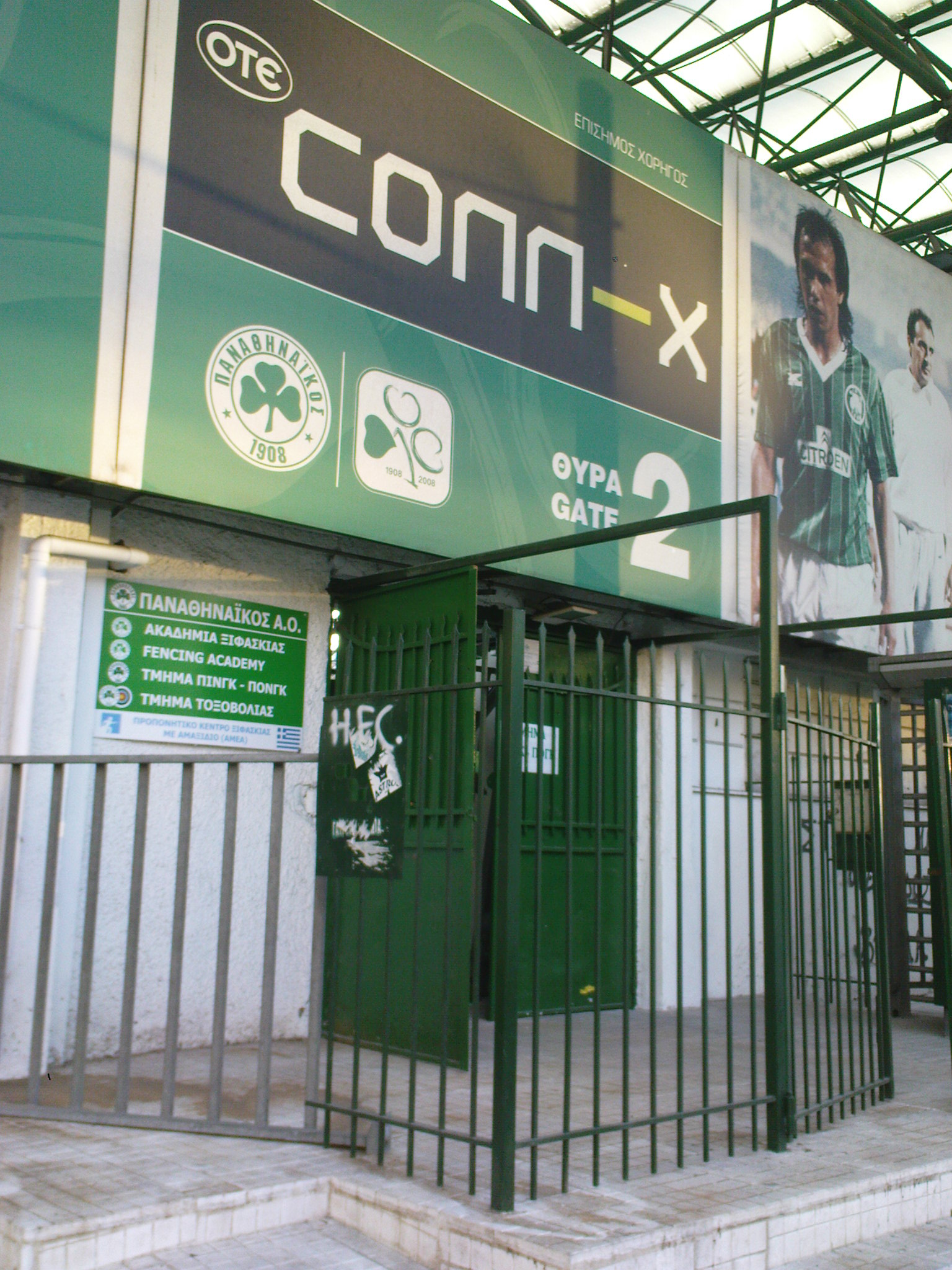
Entrance to the archery, fencing and table-tennis departments

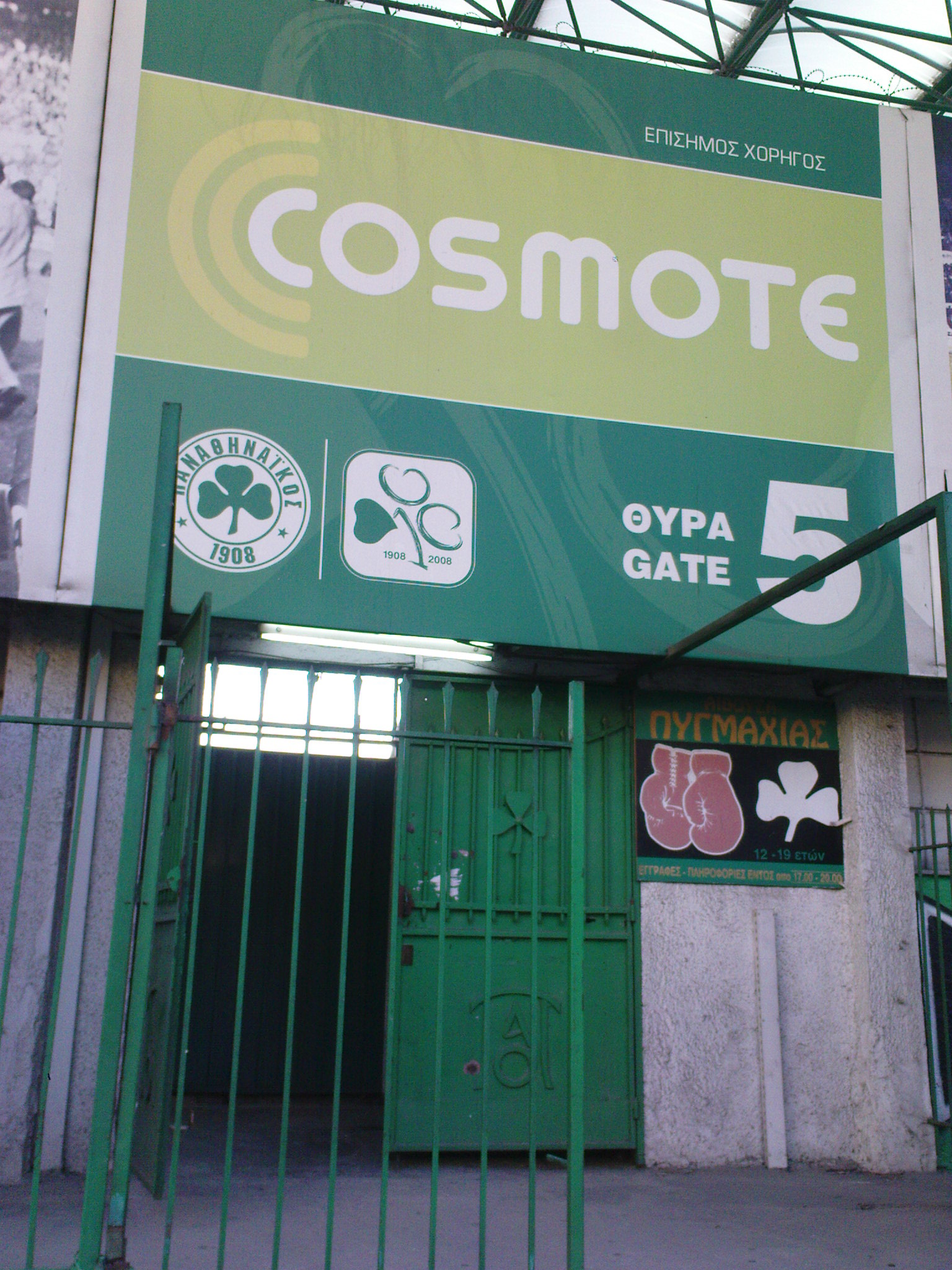
Entrance to the boxing department

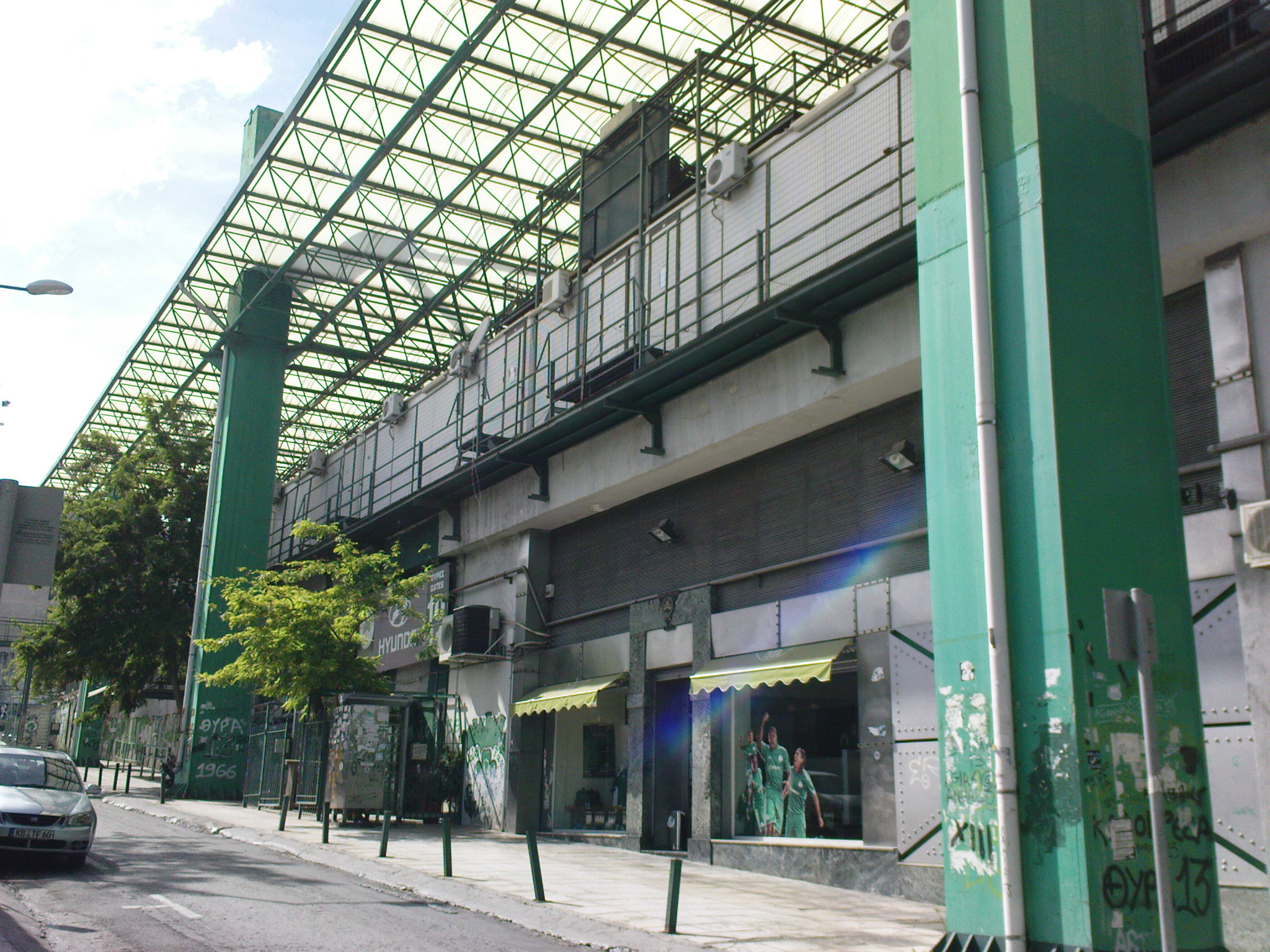
Panathinaikos shop

== See also ==
- Lists of stadiums
