= Tartakover =

Tartakover or Tartakower is a gender-neutral Jewish surname. It is related to the surname Tartakovsky, both meaning "from Tartakov".

People with the surname include:

- Aryeh Tartakower (1897–1982), Polish-born Israeli political activist, historian and sociologist
- David Tartakover (1944–2025), Israeli graphic designer and political activist
- Savielly Tartakower (1887–1956), Polish and French chess grandmaster
- Theo Tartakover (1887–1977), Australian swimmer
