= Andreas Vgenopoulos =

Andreas Vgenopoulos Ανδρέας Βγενόπουλος
- Born: 10 December 1953; Athens, Greece
- Died: 5 November 2016 (aged 62); Athens, Greece
- Education: National and Kapodistrian University of Athens
- Occupations: Shipowner; Businessperson; Business Law; Fencer
- Years active: 1990–2016
- Board member of: Marfin Investment Group; Superfast Ferries

Andreas Vgenopoulos (10 December 1953 − 5 November 2016) was the chairman of Marfin Investment Group and was a major shareholder of Panathinaikos. Vgenopoulos resigned from Panathinaikos in June 2010 citing differences with Giannis Vardinogiannis. His departure disappointed the fans of Panathinaikos. Vgenopoulos owned 1% of Marfin Popular Bank and 1.5% of the Marfin Investment Group. He had also been a Greek champion of Panathinaikos' Fencing department.

== Education and business career ==
Vgenopoulos graduated from University of Athens with a degree in Law and from Long Island University (U.S.) with an MBA.

Vgenopoulos was a shareholder of Panathinaikos F.C. until June 2010, owning 20% of the club's shares. He was also a member of the board of directors of the club alongside Giannis Vardinogiannis and Pavlos Giannakopoulos. Panathinaikos is now owned by "Panathinaiki Symmahia" (Panthenaic Alliance) with Giannis Alafouzos as president.

Vgenopoulos was also the chairman of Olympic Air, the oldest Greek airline. Marfin Investment Group (MIG) bought the company from the Greek government on 1 October 2009. During the last three years, Mr. Vgenopoulos' MIG fund has seen the wealth deteriorate, it is reported that it has lost 95% of its value. Mr. Vgenopoulos is in the process of selling Olympic to Aegean.

On 12 July 2016 the Board of Directors of MIG decided on broad changes in the management of the group with the replacement of Andreas Vgenopoulos as Chairman. Andreas Vgenopoulos remained a simple – non-executive – member. On 14 July 2016 he was appointed Chairman – non-executive member – of the Board of Directors of Hygeia Hospital.

In January 2008 he proceeded to the creation of the Panathinaikos Union Movement (PEK), with the aim of multi-shareholding or the acquisition of Panathinaikos F.C. and the strengthening of amateur Panathinaikos.

He died on Saturday 5 November 2016, at 03:30, from cardiac arrest, according to a statement issued by Hygeia Hospital of which he was president.
