= Panathinaikos Fencing =

Panathinaikos Fencing Club
- Nicknames: The Trifolium; The Great Club
- Founded: 1912, 1960 (refoundation)
- Based in: Athens, Greece
- Stadium: Leoforos Alexandras Stadium
- President: Dimitris Vranopoulos
- Website: pao1908.com

Panathinaikos Fencing Club is the fencing department of Panathinaikos A.O., the Greek multi-sport club based in Athens and is one of the most successful departments of the club. The home ground of the team is in the Leoforos Alexandras Stadium.

The department was founded in 1912 by John Cyril Campbell and was refounded in 1960 after World War II.

== History ==
The first fencing lessons at Panathinaikos A.O. were taught by John Cyril Campbell in 1912, while the department was officially recognized in 1926.

In 1960, it was re-established under Xenophon Chatzisarandos, and the team went on to win the Greek Championship in 1963 and 1965, and then from 1967 to 1974, Panathinaikos dominated by winning the national championship every year.

It is worth noting that Panathinaikos fencers earned 46 medals in the Balkan Games between 1969 and 1986. The most recent success came with Despina Georgiadou’s bronze medal in the sabre event.

== Notable fencers ==
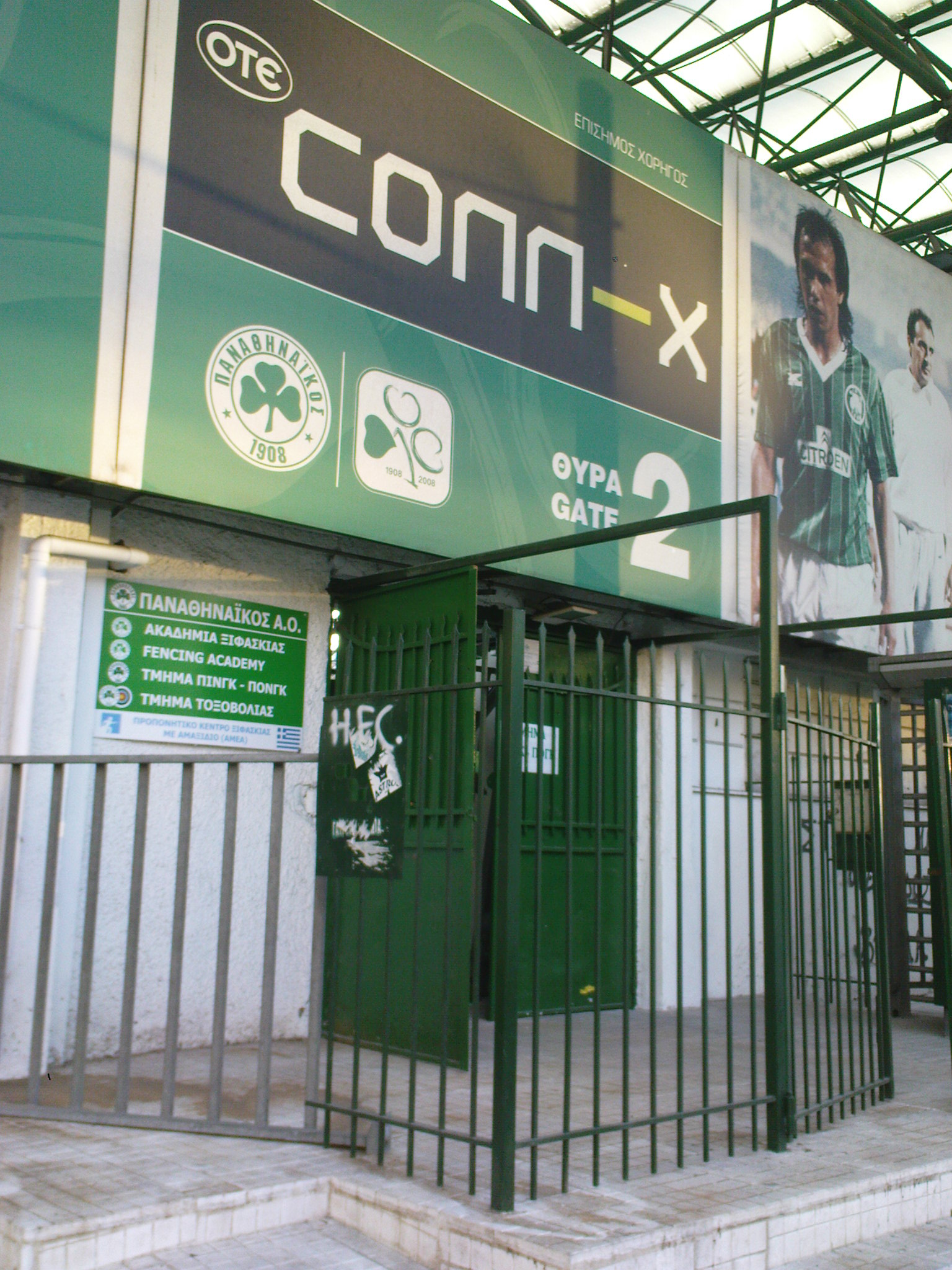
Entrance to the fencing department's facilities.

- Anna Bourdakou
- Dimitris Chatzisarantos
- Ioannis Hatzisarantos
- Markos Chatzisarantos
- Panagiotis Dourakos
- Giannis Ioannidis
- Savvas Kavadias
- Vasiliki Koumbani
- Giannis Merkatatis
- Andreas Vgenopoulos
- Despina Georgiadou

== Notable coaches ==
- John Cyril Campbell
- Xenophon Chatzisarantos
- Dimitris Kazaglis

== Honours ==
- Greek Championship, Overall Standings: (13): 1963, 1964, 1965, 1966, 1967, 1968, 1969, 1970, 1971, 1972, 1973, 1974, 1975

Greek Foil team Championship, Men: (12): 1965, 1966, 1967, 1968, 1969, 1970, 1971, 1972, 1973, 1975, 1977, 1978
Greek Épée team Championship, Men: (14): 1964, 1965, 1966, 1967, 1969, 1970, 1971, 1972, 1973, 1974, 1975, 1976, 1977, 1980
Greek Sabre team Championship, Men: (8): 1962, 1964, 1966, 1970, 1971, 1972, 1973, 1974

== Sources ==
- 100 years Panathinaikos, Liveri, 2008
- Official website (in Greek)
- fencing federation website, (Hellenic Fencing Federation)
