= Tartak =

Tartak (Polish for sawmill) may refer to:

== Places ==
=== Poland ===
- Tartak, Greater Poland Voivodeship
- Tartak, Lublin Voivodeship
- Tartak, Augustów County
- Tartak, Siemiatycze County
- Tartak, Sokółka County
- Tartak, Suwałki County
- Tartak, Mińsk County
- Tartak, Ostrołęka County

=== Belarus ===
- Tartak, Bykhaw District
- Tartak, Grodno District
- Tartak Lake, Belarus

== Other uses ==
- Tartak (band) is a Ukrainian rock group.
- Tartak (Hebrew: תַּרְתָּק), a god mentioned in 2 Kings 17:31; see Succoth-benoth

== See also ==
- Tartaks, a river in Latvia
