= Despina Georgiadou =

Greek fencer

Personal information
- Nationality: Greek
- Born: 22 June 1991 (age 35)
- Height: 1.72 m (5 ft 8 in)
- Weight: 67 kg (148 lb)

Fencing career
- Sport: Fencing
- Country: Greece
- Weapon: Sabre
- Club: Panathinaikos
- Highest ranking: 2nd (sabre, 2023)
- FIE ranking: current ranking
Medal record
Women's sabre
Representing Greece
World Championships
Silver medal – second place	2023 Milan	Individual
Bronze medal – third place	2022 Cairo	Individual
Mediterranean Games
Bronze medal – third place	2018 Tarragona	Individual

Despina Georgiadou (gr. Δέσποινα Γεωργιάδου) is a Greek sabre fencer. She won the silver medal in the women's sabre event at the 2023 World Fencing Championships held in Milan, Italy. Previously, she had won one of the bronze medals in the women's sabre event at the 2022 World Fencing Championships held in Cairo, Egypt. She won a silver medal in World Cup 2022 in Hammamet, Tunisia, a gold medal in World Cup 2023 in Tashkent, Uzbekistan, and a bronze medal in World Cup 2023 in Algiers, Algeria. She has also won the gold medal in the Grand Prix of Orléans, France, 2021, the bronze medal in the Grand Prix of Orléans, France, 2022, and the gold medal in the Grand Prix of Tunis, Tunisia, 2023. She has reached a highest end-of-season ranking No 3 in sabre in 2021/2022 season and a highest ranking No 2 in March 2023. The latter is the highest ranking ever reached by a Greek fencer.

In 2018, she won a bronze medal for Greece, at the 2018 Mediterranean Games.

She is a fencing athlete of the Greek club Panathinaikos and she was named Female Athlete of the Year of this multi-sport club in 2021. In 2016, she came first at the national championship. In total, she has won 1 gold, 2 silver and 1 bronze medals in national championships.

== Medal record ==
=== World Championship ===
Year	Location	Event	Position
2022	Cairo, Egypt	Individual Women's Sabre	3rd
2023	Milan, Italy	Individual Women's Sabre	2nd

=== Grand Prix ===
Year	Location	Event	Position
2021	Orléans, France	Individual Women's Sabre	1st
2022	Orléans, France	Individual Women's Sabre	3rd
2023	Tunis, Tunisia	Individual Women's Sabre	1st
2024	Orléans, France	Individual Women's Sabre	3rd

=== World Cup ===
Year	Location	Event	Position
2022	Hammamet, Tunisia	Individual Women's Sabre	2nd
2023	Tashkent, Uzbekistan	Individual Women's Sabre	1st
2023	Algiers, Algeria	Individual Women's Sabre	3rd
2024	Plovdiv, Bulgaria	Individual Women's Sabre	3rd
2025	Plovdiv, Bulgaria	Individual Women's Sabre	3rd
2025	Cairo, Egypt	Individual Women's Sabre	1st

=== Mediterranean Games ===
Year	Location	Event	Position
2018	Tarragona, Catalonia, Spain	Individual Women's Sabre	3rd

=== Satellite ===
Year	Location	Event	Position
2019	Tbilisi, Georgia	Individual Women's Sabre	3rd
2023	Gand, Belgium	Individual Women's Sabre	2nd
2023	Tbilisi, Georgia	Individual Women's Sabre	1st
2025	Istanbul, Türkiye	Individual Women's Sabre	3rd

=== National Championship ===
Year	Location	Event	Position
2016	OAKA, Athens	Individual Women's Sabre	1st
2018	OAKA, Athens	Individual Women's Sabre	2nd
2019	OAKA, Athens	Individual Women's Sabre	3rd
2020	OAKA, Athens	Individual Women's Sabre	2nd
