= Zohra Nora Kehli =

Algerian fencer (born 2001)

Personal information
- Nationality: Algerian
- Born: 17 January 2001 (age 25) Paris, France

Fencing career
- Sport: Fencing
- Country: Algeria
- Weapon: sabre

Zohra Nora Kehli (born 17 January 2001) is a fencer. Born in France, she represents Algeria internationally. At the 2024 Summer Olympics, she competed in the women's individual sabre event, where she lost in the Round of 64 to Yasmine Daghfous, and the women's team sabre event, where the Algerian team finished 8th overall.
