= Araceli Navarro =

Spanish fencer

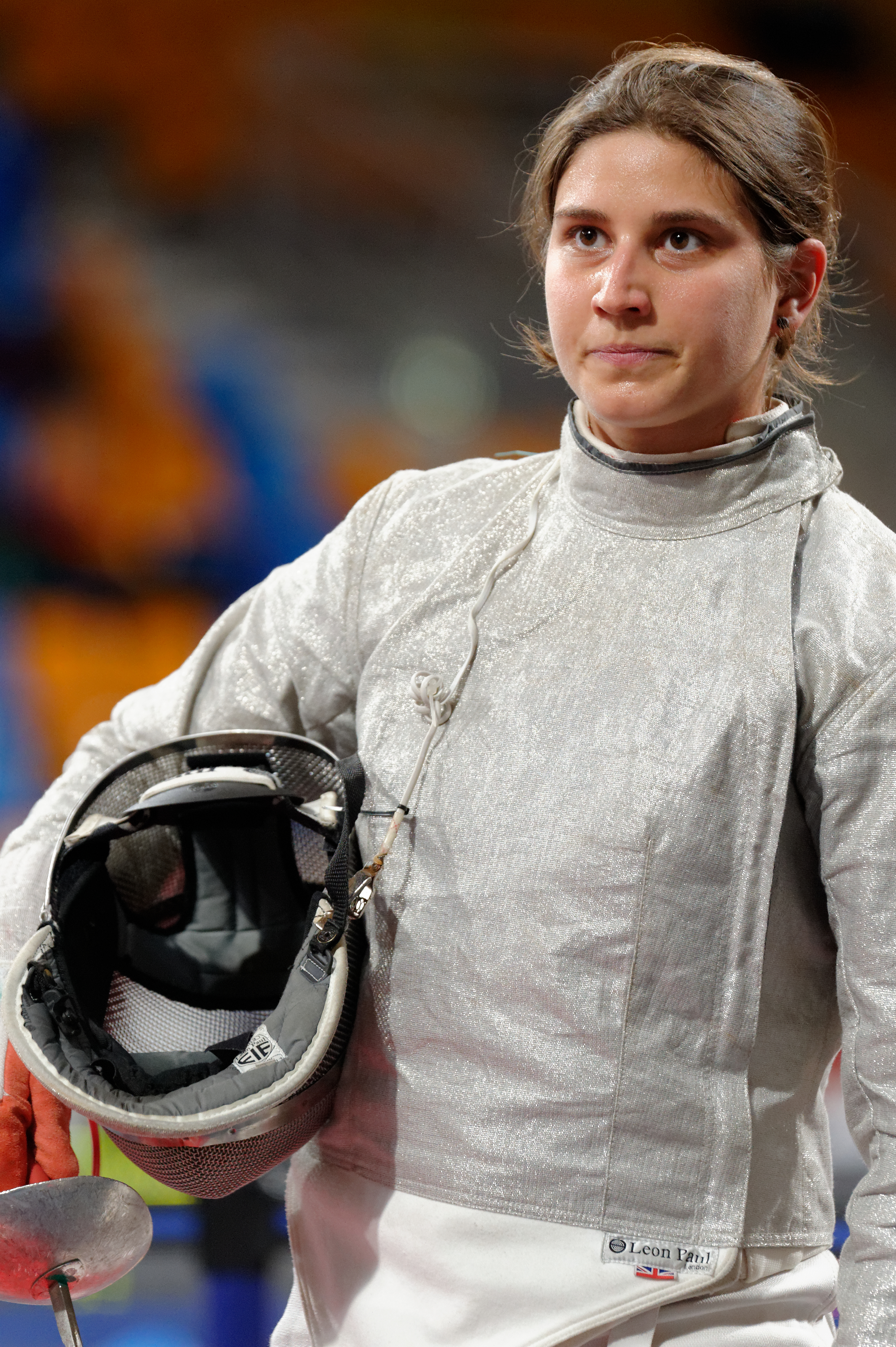

Personal information
- Full name: Araceli Navarro Laso
- Nationality: Spain
- Born: 9 August 1989 (age 37) Madrid, Spain
- Height: 1.65 m (5 ft 5 in)
- Weight: 64 kg (141 lb)

Fencing career
- Sport: Fencing
- Weapon: sabre
- Hand: right-handed
- Club: Club de Esgrima de Madrid
- FIE ranking: current ranking
Medal record
Women's sabre
Representing Spain
World Championships
Bronze medal – third place	2022 Cairo	Individual
European Championships
Bronze medal – third place	2024 Basel	Individual
Bronze medal – third place	2024 Basel	Team
Mediterranean Games
Bronze medal – third place	2026 Taranto	Individual

Araceli Navarro Laso (born August 9, 1989) is a Spanish sabre fencer. She won one of the bronze medals in the women's sabre event at the 2022 World Fencing Championships held in Cairo, Egypt. Navarro represented Spain at the 2008 Summer Olympics in Beijing, where she competed in the women's individual sabre event.

At the Olympics, she defeated Mexico's Angélica Larios in the preliminary round of sixty-four, before she was forced to retire in her next match against United States' Rebecca Ward, because of a dislocated left shoulder injury, with a score of 7–12.
