= Manon Brunet =

French fencer (born 1996)

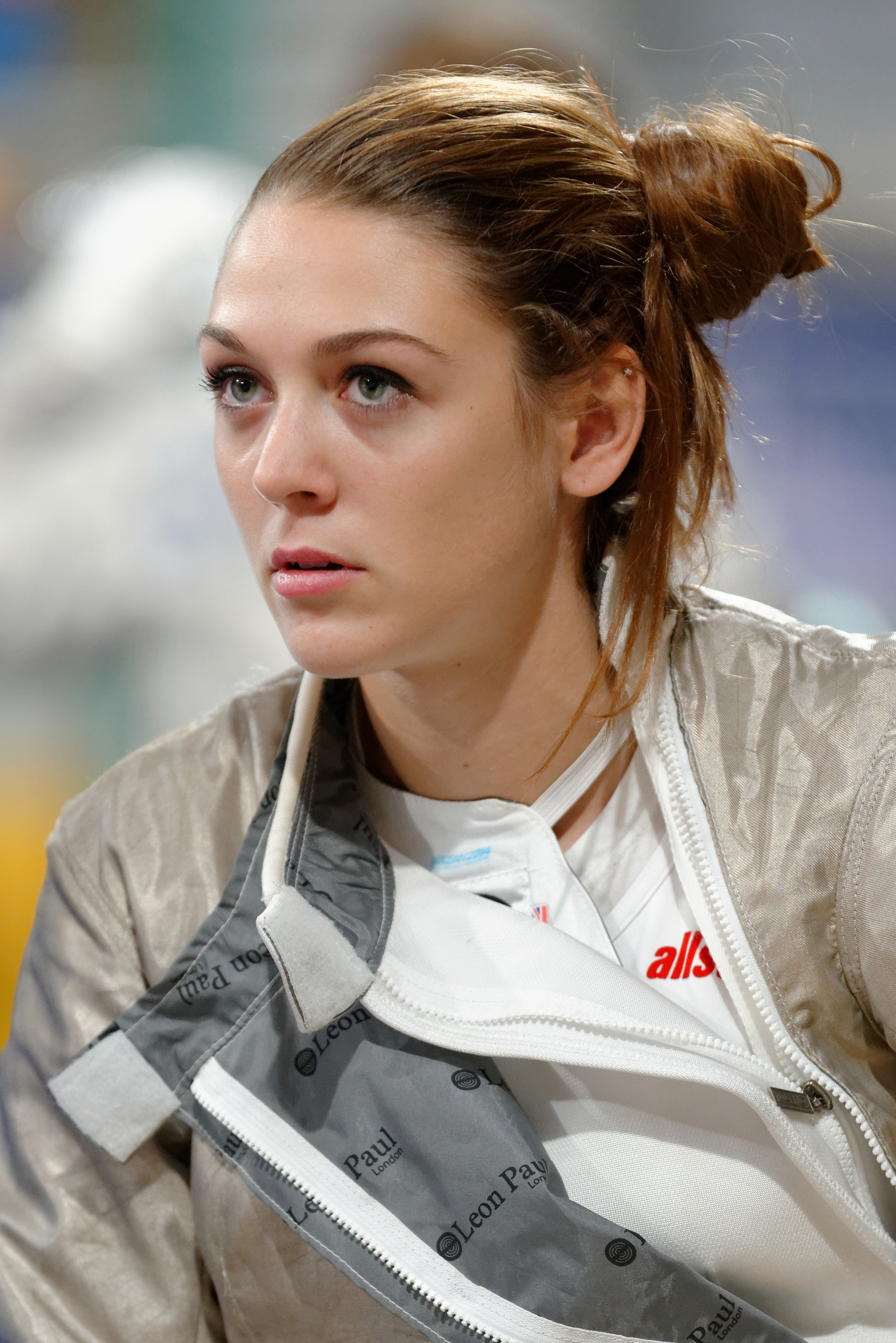
- Brunet in November 2014

Personal information
- Nickname: Brunette
- Born: 7 February 1996 (age 30) Lyon, France
- Height: 1.70 m (5 ft 7 in)
- Weight: 55 kg (121 lb)

Fencing career
- Sport: Fencing
- Country: France
- Weapon: Sabre
- Hand: right-handed
- National coach: Mathieu Gourdain
- Club: Cercle d'escrime orléanais
- Personal coach: Christian Bauer
- FIE ranking: current ranking
Medal record
Women's sabre
Representing France
Olympic Games
| Gold medal – first place | 2024 Paris | Individual |
| Silver medal – second place | 2020 Tokyo | Team |
| Bronze medal – third place | 2020 Tokyo | Individual |
World Championships
| Gold medal – first place | 2018 Wuxi | Team |
| Silver medal – second place | 2014 Kazan | Team |
| Silver medal – second place | 2019 Budapest | Team |
| Silver medal – second place | 2023 Milan | Team |
| Bronze medal – third place | 2017 Leipzig | Team |
| Bronze medal – third place | 2026 Hong Kong | Team |
European Games
| Gold medal – first place | 2023 Kraków–Małopolska | Team |
European Championships
| Gold medal – first place | 2023 Plovdiv | Individual |
| Gold medal – first place | 2023 Kraków | Team |
| Gold medal – first place | 2024 Basel | Team |
| Silver medal – second place | 2014 Strasbourg | Team |
| Silver medal – second place | 2015 Montreux | Team |
| Silver medal – second place | 2016 Toruń | Team |
| Silver medal – second place | 2019 Düsseldorf | Individual |
| Silver medal – second place | 2026 Antony | Team |
| Bronze medal – third place | 2017 Tbilisi | Team |
| Bronze medal – third place | 2018 Novi Sad | Team |
| Bronze medal – third place | 2019 Düsseldorf | Team |

Manon Apithy-Brunet (born 7 February 1996) is a French right-handed sabre fencer, 2018 team world champion, two-time Olympian, 2021 team Olympic silver medalist, and 2021 individual Olympic bronze medalist. She won the individual event in 2024 at her home Olympics in Paris by beating her fellow countrywoman, Sara Balzer in the all-French gold medal bout.

== Personal life ==
Brunet was born in Lyon, France. She is the only child of her parents. Her father, Philippe Brunet, played football for French Ligue 1 club Olympique Lyonnais. She began fencing at age seven at the Sabre au Clair club in Lyon, France. Her potential was soon noticed by the national training hub [Pole Espoir] in Orleans, France, which led to her joining the Cercle d'Escrime Orleanais club at the age of 15 and eventually the National Institute for Sport, Expertise and Performance [INSEP] in Paris, France.

Brunet started off with taekwondo and dancing but did not enjoy either of them. A friend of hers suggested that she try fencing. She was attracted to fencing at first because it was kind of funny. The idea of wearing some sort of disguise amused her. Brunet loved the idea of herself being the only girl at her fencing club.

Brunet obtained a degree in marketing from EDHEC Business School. Brunet married fellow French sabre fencer Boladé Apithy in 2021.

== Medal record ==
=== Olympic Games ===
| Year | Location | Event | Position |
|---|---|---|---|
| 2021 | Tokyo, Japan | Individual Women's Sabre | 3rd |
| 2021 | Tokyo, Japan | Team Women's Sabre | 2nd |
| 2024 | Paris, France | Individual Women's Sabre | 1st |

=== World Championship ===
| Year | Location | Event | Position |
|---|---|---|---|
| 2014 | Kazan, Russia | Team Women's Sabre | 2nd |
| 2017 | Leipzig, Germany | Team Women's Sabre | 3rd |
| 2018 | Wuxi, China | Team Women's Sabre | 1st |
| 2019 | Budapest, Hungary | Team Women's Sabre | 2nd |

=== European Championship ===
| Year | Location | Event | Position |
|---|---|---|---|
| 2014 | Strasbourg, France | Team Women's Sabre | 2nd |
| 2015 | Montreux, Switzerland | Team Women's Sabre | 2nd |
| 2016 | Toruń, Poland | Team Women's Sabre | 2nd |
| 2017 | (Georgia (country)) Tbilisi, Georgia | Team Women's Sabre | 3rd |
| 2018 | Novi Sad, Serbia | Team Women's Sabre | 3rd |
| 2019 | Düsseldorf, Germany | Individual Women's Sabre | 2nd |
| 2019 | Düsseldorf, Germany | Team Women's Sabre | 3rd |

=== Grand Prix ===
| Date | Location | Event | Position |
|---|---|---|---|
| 2019-04-26 | Seoul, South Korea | Individual Women's Sabre | 3rd |
| 2023-12-09 | Orleans, France | Individual Women's Sabre | 1st |

=== World Cup ===
| Date | Location | Event | Position |
|---|---|---|---|
| 2015-10-09 | Caracas, Venezuela | Individual Women's Sabre | 3rd |
| 2016-11-18 | Orléans, France | Individual Women's Sabre | 1st |
| 2017-02-17 | Athens, Greece | Individual Women's Sabre | 2nd |
| 2017-03-24 | Yangzhou, China | Individual Women's Sabre | 1st |
| 2017-05-12 | Tunis, Tunisia | Individual Women's Sabre | 3rd |
| 2017-10-27 | Orléans, France | Individual Women's Sabre | 3rd |
| 2018-03-16 | Athens, Greece | Individual Women's Sabre | 3rd |
| 2018-06-01 | Tunis, Tunisia | Individual Women's Sabre | 1st |
| 2019-03-22 | Sint-Niklaas, Belgium | Individual Women's Sabre | 1st |
| 2019-11-22 | Orléans, France | Individual Women's Sabre | 1st |
| 2019-12-13 | (United States) Salt Lake City, Utah | Individual Women's Sabre | 3rd |
| 2022-01-28 | Plovdiv, Bulgaria | Individual Women's Sabre | 2nd |
| 2022-03-18 | Istanbul, Turkey | Individual Women's Sabre | 1st |
| 2022-05-06 | Hammamet, Tunisia | Individual Women's Sabre | 3rd |
| 2024-03-04 | Acropolis, Greece | Individual Women's Sabre | 3rd |

== Awards and honours ==
Orders

- Knight of the Legion of Honour: 2024
