= 2023 World Fencing Championships =

Fencing event in Milan, Italy

- Dates: 22–30 July
- Host city: Milan, Italy
- Venue: Milan Convention Center
- Website: www.milano2023.com

The 2023 World Fencing Championships were held from 22 to 30 July 2023 in Milan, Italy.

After the Olga Kharlan handshaking incident at the championships, in which she tapped blades as an alternative to shaking the hand of a defeated Russian opponent and was subsequently disqualified, the International Fencing Federation changed its rules so that the previously required handshakes between fencers at the end of a bout would become optional, with a distance greeting permitted instead.

== Schedule ==
Twelve events were held.

All times are local (UTC+2).

Date	Time	Round
22 July	09:00	Women's épée qualification
22 July	09:00	Men's sabre qualification
23 July	09:00	Women's foil qualification
23 July	09:00	Men's épée qualification
24 July	09:00	Women's sabre qualification
24 July	09:00	Men's foil qualification
25 July	08:30	Women's épée
25 July	08:30	Men's sabre
26 July	08:30	Women's foil
26 July	08:30	Men's épée
27 July	10:00	Women's épée team
27 July	10:00	Men's sabre team
27 July	10:00	Women's sabre
27 July	10:00	Men's foil
28 July	09:00	Men's épée team
28 July	09:00	Women's foil team
28 July	10:00	Women's épée team
28 July	10:00	Men's sabre team
29 July	09:00	Men's foil team
29 July	09:00	Women's sabre team
29 July	10:00	Women's foil team
29 July	10:00	Men's épée team
30 July	10:30	Women's sabre team
30 July	10:30	Men's foil team

== Medal summary ==
=== Medal table ===
* Host nation (Italy)

Rank	Nation	Gold	Silver	Bronze	Total
1	Italy*	4	4	2	10
2	Hungary	3	0	1	4
3	Japan	2	0	2	4
4	France	1	3	2	6
5	United States	1	1	2	4
6	Poland	1	0	0	1
7	South Korea	0	1	2	3
8	China	0	1	1	2
8	Greece	0	1	1	2
10	Georgia	0	1	0	1
11	Bulgaria	0	0	1	1
11	Egypt	0	0	1	1
11	Hong Kong	0	0	1	1
11	Kazakhstan	0	0	1	1
11	Venezuela	0	0	1	1
Totals (15 entries)		12	12	18	42

=== Men ===
Event	Gold	Silver	Bronze
Individual épée	Máté Tamás Koch; Hungary	Davide Di Veroli; Italy	Romain Cannone; France
Individual épée	Máté Tamás Koch; Hungary	Davide Di Veroli; Italy	Ruslan Kurbanov; Kazakhstan
Team épée	Italy; Gabriele Cimini; Davide Di Veroli; Andrea Santarelli; Federico Vismara	France; Alexandre Bardenet; Gaétan Billa; Yannick Borel; Romain Cannone	Venezuela; Francisco Limardo; Jesús Limardo; Rubén Limardo; Grabiel Lugo
Individual foil	Tommaso Marini; Italy	Nick Itkin; United States	Kyosuke Matsuyama; Japan
Individual foil	Tommaso Marini; Italy	Nick Itkin; United States	Enzo Lefort; France
Team foil	Japan; Kazuki Iimura; Kyosuke Matsuyama; Takahiro Shikine; Kenta Suzumura	China; Chen Haiwei; Mo Ziwei; Wu Bin; Xu Jie	Hong Kong; Cheung Ka Long; Ryan Choi; Leung Chin Yu; Yeung Chi Ka
Individual sabre	Eli Dershwitz; United States	Sandro Bazadze; Georgia	Ziad El-Sissy; Egypt
Individual sabre	Eli Dershwitz; United States	Sandro Bazadze; Georgia	Áron Szilágyi; Hungary
Team sabre	Hungary; Tamás Decsi; Csanád Gémesi; András Szatmári; Áron Szilágyi	South Korea; Gu Bon-gil; Ha Han-sol; Kim Jun-ho; Oh Sang-uk	United States; Eli Dershwitz; Andrew Doddo; Colin Heathcock; Mitchell Saron

=== Women ===
Event	Gold	Silver	Bronze
Individual épée	Marie-Florence Candassamy; France	Alberta Santuccio; Italy	Mara Navarria; Italy
Individual épée	Marie-Florence Candassamy; France	Alberta Santuccio; Italy	Sun Yiwen; China
Team épée	Poland; Renata Knapik-Miazga; Magdalena Pawłowska; Martyna Swatowska-Wenglarczyk; Ewa Trzebińska	Italy; Rossella Fiamingo; Federica Isola; Mara Navarria; Alberta Santuccio	South Korea; Choi In-jeong; Kang Young-mi; Lee Hye-in; Song Se-ra
Individual foil	Alice Volpi; Italy	Arianna Errigo; Italy	Martina Favaretto; Italy
Individual foil	Alice Volpi; Italy	Arianna Errigo; Italy	Lee Kiefer; United States
Team foil	Italy; Arianna Errigo; Martina Favaretto; Francesca Palumbo; Alice Volpi	France; Solène Butruille; Morgane Patru; Pauline Ranvier; Ysaora Thibus	Japan; Sera Azuma; Komaki Kikuchi; Karin Miyawaki; Yuka Ueno
Individual sabre	Misaki Emura; Japan	Despina Georgiadou; Greece	Theodora Gkountoura; Greece
Individual sabre	Misaki Emura; Japan	Despina Georgiadou; Greece	Yoana Ilieva; Bulgaria
Team sabre	Hungary; Sugár Katinka Battai; Anna Márton; Liza Pusztai; Luca Szűcs	France; Sara Balzer; Manon Brunet; Caroline Queroli; Margaux Rifkiss	South Korea; Choi Se-bin; Jeon Eun-hye; Jeon Ha-young; Yoon Ji-su
