= Nisanur Erbil =

Turkish fencer (born 2003)

Personal information
- Born: 22 April 2003 (age 23) Samsun, Turkey

Sport
- Sport: Fencing
- Event: Sabre
Medal record
Women's fencing
Representing Turkey
Olympics Qualification
Silver medal – second place	2024 Differdange	Individual
Grand Prix - Sabre
Silver medal – second place	2024 Tunis	Individual
Mediterranean Games
Silver medal – second place	2026 Taranto	Individual Sabre
World Cup
Silver medal – second place	2020 Segovia	J Individual
World Cadets and Juniors Championships
Bronze medal – third place	2023 Plovdiv	J Individual
Silver medal – second place	2021 Cairo	J Individual
Junior Women Sabre World Cup
Bronze medal – third place	2023 Segovia	J Individual
Women’s Sabre World Cup
Silver medal – second place	2019 Tashkent	C Individual
European Cadets and Juniors Championships
Silver medal – second place	2022 Novi Sad	J Individual
Gold medal – first place	2019 Foggia	C Individual
Bronze medal – third place	2018 Sochi	C Individual
Bronze medal – third place	2018 Sochi	C Team

Nisanur Erbil (born 22 April 2003) is a Turkish fencer competing in the sabre event. She qualified for the 2024 Summer Olympics.

== Early years ==
In the beginning, Erbil was interested in playing volleyball. She was discovered for fencing by a talent scout at age 13 in the school in Samsun. She switched over to fencing because she wanted to perform a sport for individuals. At her age of 14, she went alone to Ankara, and was admitted to the national fencing team three months later.

=== 2018 ===
In 2018, Erbil participated at the Youth Olympics held in Buenos Aires, Argentina. She lost the first match in the Round of 16.

She competed at the 2018 Mediterranean Games in Tarragona, Spain, did not advance, however, to the quarter-finals.

She won the bronze medal with her teammates in the cadet category and another bronze medal in the cadet individual event at the 2018 European Cadets and Juniors Fencing Championships in Sochi, Russia.

=== 2019 ===
She won the silver medal at the 2019 FIE Junior Women’s Sabre World Cup in Tashkent, Uzbekistan.

At the 2019 European Cadets and Juniors Fencing Championships in Foggia, Italy, she captured the gold medal in the cadet category.

=== 2020 ===
At the 2020 FIE World Cup in Segovia, Spain, she won the silver medal.

=== 2021 ===
She captured the silver medal at the 2021 World Cadets and Juniors Fencing Championships in Cairo, Egypt.

=== 2022 ===
She won the silver medal at the 2022 European Cadets and Juniors Fencing Championships in Novis Sad, Serbia.

=== 2023 ===
At the 2023 Junior and Cadet Fencing World Championships in Plovdiv, Bulgaria, she took the bronze medal.

She received the bronze medal at the 2023 Junior Women Sabre World Cup in Segovia, Spain.

== Career ==
=== 2023 ===
She competed unsuccessfully at the 2023 European Games in Kraków, Poland.

At the 2023 World Fencing Championships in Milan, Italy, she did not advance further from the Round of 32.

=== 2024 ===
She won the silver medal at the 2024 Fencing Grand Prix - Sabre in Tunis, Tunisia. She became so the first ever Turkish fencer to win a World Cup medal, and rose to number 21 in the world ranking list for senior women.

She took the silver medal at the European Fencing Olympic Qualification Tournament in Differdange, Luxembourg. She qualified to represent Turkey in the 2024 Olympics in Paris, France.

== Personal life ==
Nisanur Erbil was born as the youngest of three children in Samsun, Turkey on 22 April 2003.

She was schooled in Samsun, but completed the high school in Ankara after she moved there at age 14. She is a student at Başkent University in Ankara.
