= Yasmine Daghfous =

Tunisian fencer (born 2000)

Personal information
- Born: 1 January 2000 (age 26)

Fencing career
- Sport: Fencing
- Country: Tunisia
Medal record
Representing Tunisia
African Championships
Silver medal – second place	2024 Casablanca	Team foil

Yasmine Daghfous (born 1 January 2000) is a Tunisian fencer. She competed in the women's sabre event at the 2020 Summer Olympics in Tokyo, Japan. She also competed in the women's team sabre event.

She competed at the 2022 Mediterranean Games held in Oran, Algeria.
