= Caitlin Maxwell =

British fencer

Personal information
- Nationality: British (English)
- Born: 2 May 1999 (age 27)

Fencing career
- Sport: Fencing
- Weapon: Sabre
- Hand: left-handed
- Head coach: Jon Salfield
Medal record
Women's Sabre
Representing England
British Championships
| Gold medal – first place | 2016 | sabre |
| Gold medal – first place | 2017 | sabre |
| Gold medal – first place | 2018 | sabre |
| Gold medal – first place | 2019 | sabre |
| Gold medal – first place | 2021 | sabre |
| Gold medal – first place | 2022 | sabre |

Caitlin Maxwell (born 2 May 1999) is an English sabre fencer and is a seven-time British champion.

== Biography ==
Maxwell began fencing at the age of 8, at school and at her local club in Truro.

She has won the British sabre national title on six occasions at the British Fencing Championships from 2016 to 2022 and 2025.
