= Risa Takashima =

Japanese fencer (born 1999)

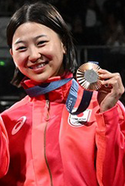
- Takashima, after receiving her medal at the 2024 Olympic Games

Personal information
- Native name: 髙嶋理紗
- Nationality: Japan
- Born: 8 February 1999 (age 27) Ōmuta, Fukuoka, Japan
Medal record
Women's fencing
Representing Japan
Olympic Games
Bronze medal – third place	2024 Paris	Team
Asian Games
Bronze medal – third place	2018 Jakarta-Palembang	Team
Asian Championships
Bronze medal – third place	2016 Wuxi	Team
Bronze medal – third place	2023 Wuxi	Team
Bronze medal – third place	2024 Kuwait City	Team

Risa Takashima (born 8 February 1999) is a Japanese fencer. She won the bronze medal in the women's team sabre event at the 2024 Summer Olympics.
