= Yoana Ilieva =

Bulgarian fencer (born 2001)

Personal information
- Nationality: Bulgaria
- Born: 20 June 2001 (age 25) Sofia, Bulgaria

Fencing career
- Sport: Fencing
- Weapon: Sabre
- Hand: left-handed
- Club: Team Vasil Etropolski Fencing Academy / Svechnikov Fencing Club
- Head coach: Ivailo Vodenov
- FIE ranking: current ranking
Medal record
Women's sabre
Representing Bulgaria
World Championships
Bronze medal – third place	2023 Milan	Women's sabre

Yoana Ilieva (Bulgarian: Йоана Илиева) (born 20 June 2001) is a Bulgarian fencer, specializing in sabre, who competed at the 2024 Paris Olympics. She won the bronze medal at 2023 World Fencing Championships in women's sabre alongside Theodora Gkountoura from Greece. She became the first Bulgarian woman to win a World Cup tournament in 2025 after winning in Plovdiv.
