= Anna Bashta =

Russian-born Azerbaijani fencer

- Bashta in 2019

Personal information
- Full name: Anna Vitalievna Bashta
- Nationality: Russian (until 2018); Azerbaijani (from 2018)
- Born: 10 July 1996 (age 29) Togliatti, Russia
- Height: 1.68 m (5 ft 6 in)

Sport
- Country: Azerbaijan
- Sport: Fencing
Medal record
Women's sabre
Representing Azerbaijan
World Championships
Silver medal – second place	2022 Cairo	Individual
European Championships
Gold medal – first place	2022 Antalya	Sabre
Islamic Solidarity Games
Gold medal – first place	2021 Konya	Sabre team
Representing Russia
European Championships
Silver medal – second place	2017 Tbilisi	Sabre team
Universiade
Gold medal – first place	2015 Gwangju	Sabre individual
Silver medal – second place	2015 Gwangju	Sabre team

Anna Vitalievna Bashta (Anna Vitalyevna Başta, Анна Витальевна Башта, born 10 July 1996 in Togliatti) is a Russian-born Azerbaijani fencer. She won the silver medal in the women's sabre event at the 2022 World Fencing Championships held in Cairo, Egypt. She competed at the 2020 Summer Olympics, in Women's sabre. She has been ranked #1 in the world in women's sabre in 2022.

== Career ==
She won one gold medal and one silver at the 2015 Summer Universiade. She represented Russia until 2018; in 2019 she switched nationality and began competing for Azerbaijan.

Bashta claimed a spot in the sabre events as the winner of Zonal Qualifier – Europe which was held in Madrid, Spain. She beat Anna Limbach of Germany in the final 15-13 to qualify for the 2020 Olympics in Tokyo, Japan.

She won the gold medal in the women's sabre event at the 2022 European Fencing Championships held in Antalya, Turkey.

== See also ==
- Russia at the 2015 Summer Universiade
- Azerbaijan at the 2020 Summer Olympics
- Azerbaijan at the 2023 European Games
