= Michela Battiston =

Italian fencer (born 1997)

Personal information
- Nationality: Italian
- Born: 15 September 1997 (age 29) Palmanova, Italy

Sport
- Sport: Fencing
Medal record
Women's sabre
Representing Italy
European Championships
Silver medal – second place	2022 Antalya	Team
Bronze medal – third place	2025 Genoa	Team
Bronze medal – third place	2026 Antony	Team
Universiade
Gold medal – first place	2019 Naples	Team
Bronze medal – third place	2019 Naples	Individual

Michela Battiston (born 15 September 1997) is an Italian fencer. She competed in the women's team sabre event at the 2020 Summer Olympics.
