= Sara Balzer =

French fencer (born 1995)

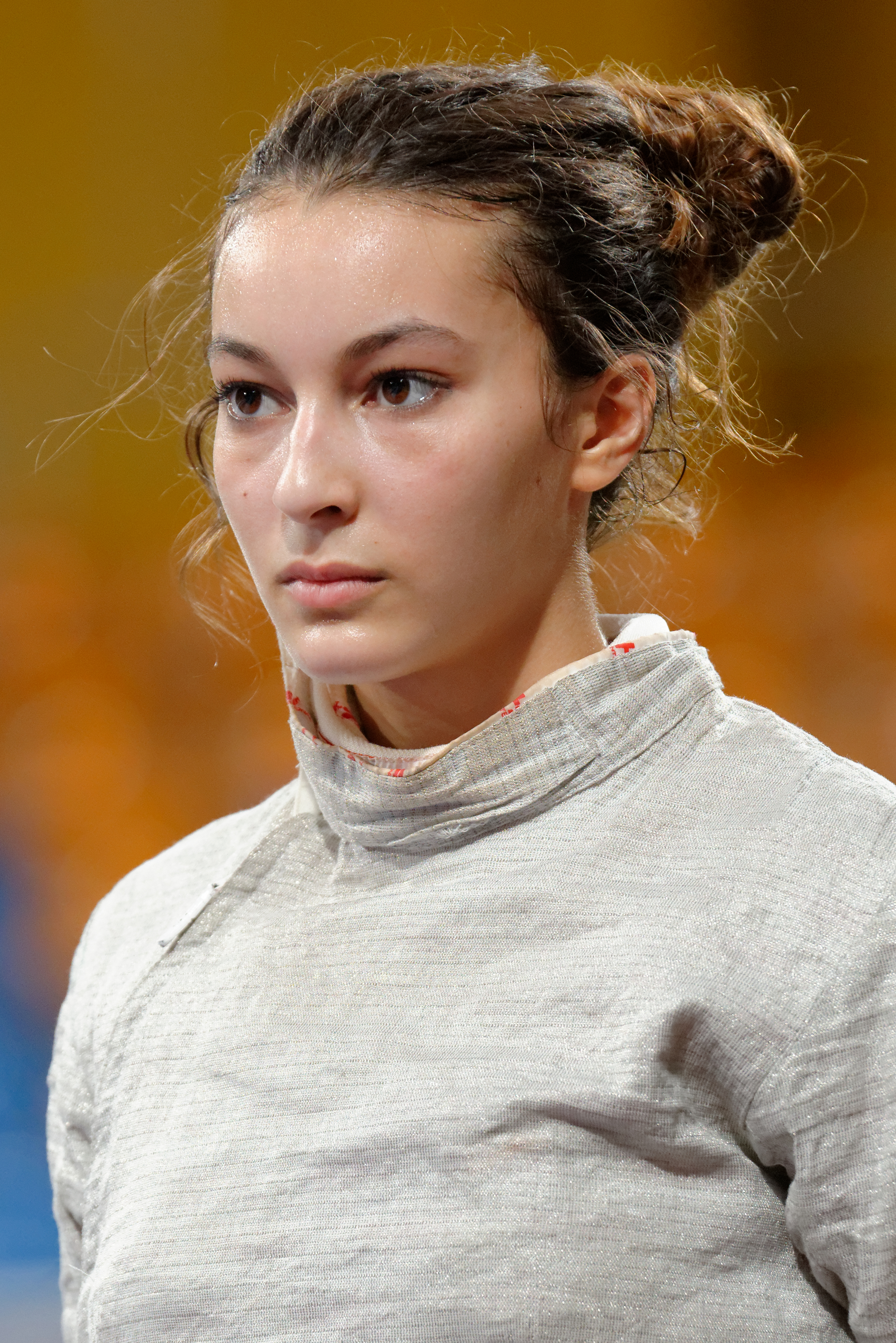
- Balzer in 2014

Personal information
- Born: 3 April 1995 (age 31) Strasbourg, France
- Height: 1.77 m (5 ft 10 in)
- Weight: 66 kg (146 lb)

Fencing career
- Sport: Fencing
- Country: France
- Weapon: Sabre
- Hand: left-handed
- National coach: Mathieu Gourdain
- Club: Strasbourg Université Club
- FIE ranking: current ranking
Medal record
Women's sabre
Representing France
Olympic Games
Silver medal – second place	2020 Tokyo	Team
Silver medal – second place	2024 Paris	Individual
World Championships
Gold medal – first place	2025 Tbilisi	Team
Silver medal – second place	2022 Cairo	Team
Silver medal – second place	2023 Milan	Team
Silver medal – second place	2026 Hong Kong	Individual
Bronze medal – third place	2026 Hong Kong	Team
European Games
Gold medal – first place	2023 Kraków–Małopolska	Team
European Championships
Gold medal – first place	2022 Antalya	Team
Gold medal – first place	2023 Kraków	Team
Gold medal – first place	2025 Genoa	Team
Silver medal – second place	2023 Plovdiv	Individual
Silver medal – second place	2026 Antony	Team
Bronze medal – third place	2017 Tbilisi	Team
Bronze medal – third place	2022 Antalya	Individual
Universiade
Gold medal – first place	2019 Naples	Individual
Silver medal – second place	2019 Naples	Team
Bronze medal – third place	2015 Gwangju	Team

Sara Balzer (born 3 April 1995) is a French left-handed sabre fencer. She won two Olympic silver medals, the first at the 2021 team event, and the second on home soil at the 2024 individual event. She has been ranked #1 in the world in women's sabre in 2022–2023 and 2023–2024.

== Personal life ==
Balzer was born in Strasbourg to a French father and a mother of Algerian descent. Her maternal grandfather was a spahi in the French Army.

== Medal record ==
=== Olympic Games ===
Year	Location	Event	Position
2021	Tokyo, Japan	Team Women's Sabre	2nd
2024	Paris, France	Individual Women's Sabre	2nd

=== World Championship ===
Year	Location	Event	Position
2017	Leipzig, Germany	Team Women's Sabre	3rd
2022	Cairo, Egypt	Team Women's Sabre	2nd
2023	Milan, Italy	Team Women's Sabre	2nd
2025	(Georgia (country)) Tbilisi, Georgia	Team Women's Sabre	1st

=== European Championship ===
Year	Location	Event	Position
2017	(Georgia (country)) Tbilisi, Georgia	Team Women's Sabre	3rd
2022	Antalya, Turkey	Individual Women's Sabre	3rd
2023	Plovdiv, Bulgaria	Individual Women's Sabre	2nd

=== World Cup ===
Date	Location	Event	Position
2017-03-24	Yangzhou, China	Individual Women's Sabre	2nd
2022-03-03	Athens, Greece	Individual Women's Sabre	3rd
2023-03-17	Sint-Niklaas, Belgium	Individual Women's Sabre	1st
2023-05-12	(Georgia (country)) Batumi, Georgia	Individual Women's Sabre	1st
2023-11-09	Algiers, Algeria	Individual Women's Sabre	1st
2024-03-01	Acropolis, Greece	Individual Women's Sabre	1st
2024-03-15	Sint-Niklaas, Belgium	Individual Women's Sabre	1st
2024-05-17	Plovdiv, Bulgaria	Individual Women's Sabre	1st

=== Grand Prix ===
Year	Location	Event	Position
2023-04-28	Seoul, South Korea	Individual Women's Sabre	2nd
2023-12-08	Orleans, France	Individual Women's Sabre	3rd
2024-05-05	Seoul, South Korea	Individual Women's Sabre	3rd

== See also ==
- France at the 2019 Summer Universiade
