= Elizabeth Tartakovsky =

American fencer (born 2000)

Personal information
- Born: May 24, 2000 (age 26) Livingston, New Jersey, U.S.

Fencing career
- Sport: Fencing
- Country: United States
- Weapon: Saber
- Hand: Right
- Club: Manhattan Fencing Center
- Head coach: Yury Gelman
- FIE ranking: current ranking
Medal record
Women's sabre
Representing the United States
Pan American Championships
Gold medal – first place	2024 Lima	Individual
Gold medal – first place	2024 Lima	Team
Gold medal – first place	2023 Lima	Team
Gold medal – first place	2022 Asunción	Team
Bronze medal – third place	2023 Lima	Individual

Elizabeth Tartakovsky (born May 24, 2000) is an American saber fencer. She represented the United States at the 2024 Summer Olympics in Paris, France, in the Women's sabre and Women's team sabre on July 29 and August 3, 2024.

== Early and personal life ==
Tartakovsky was born on May 24, 2000, in Livingston, New Jersey, and is Jewish. Her parents are from Kyiv, Ukraine, and immigrated to the United States in the early 1990s. Her great-uncle, and coach, is Ukrainian-born Jewish American seven-time Olympic fencing coach Yury Gelman, and her sister Gabrielle fenced for Harvard. Before fencing, she was a ballet skater. Tartakovsky speaks English, Russian, and Spanish.

She graduated Livingston High School in 2018, after being a four-year varsity fencer and named First Team All-State in 2017. Tartakovsky then graduated Harvard University in 2023 with a degree in economics; while at the school she was named the 2019 Ivy League Individual Champion. In 2022 she was the Women's Sabre NCAA National Champion, NCAA Northeast Regional Women's Sabre Champion, All-America First Team, Women's Sabre Northeast Regional Champion, and USFCA National Collegiate Women's Sabre Athlete of the Year.

== Fencing career ==
In 2017, Tartakovsky was the bronze medalist in the World Cadets Fencing Championship. She was the Individual Ivy League Champion, and bronze medalist at the NCAA Championships in sabre in 2019.

Tartakovsky tied for bronze at the 2022 US Nationals in sabre. She was the women's sabre NCAA National Champion in 2022, and the silver medalist in 2023. At the 2023 Pan American Fencing Championship, she tied for third. At the 2024 Coupe de Monde, she again took third.

She will represent the United States at the 2024 Summer Olympics in Paris, France, at the Grand Palais in the Women's sabre and Women's team sabre on July 29 and August 3, 2024.

== See also ==
- List of Jewish fencers
- NCAA fencing champions
