= Theodora Gkountoura =

Greek fencer (born 1997)

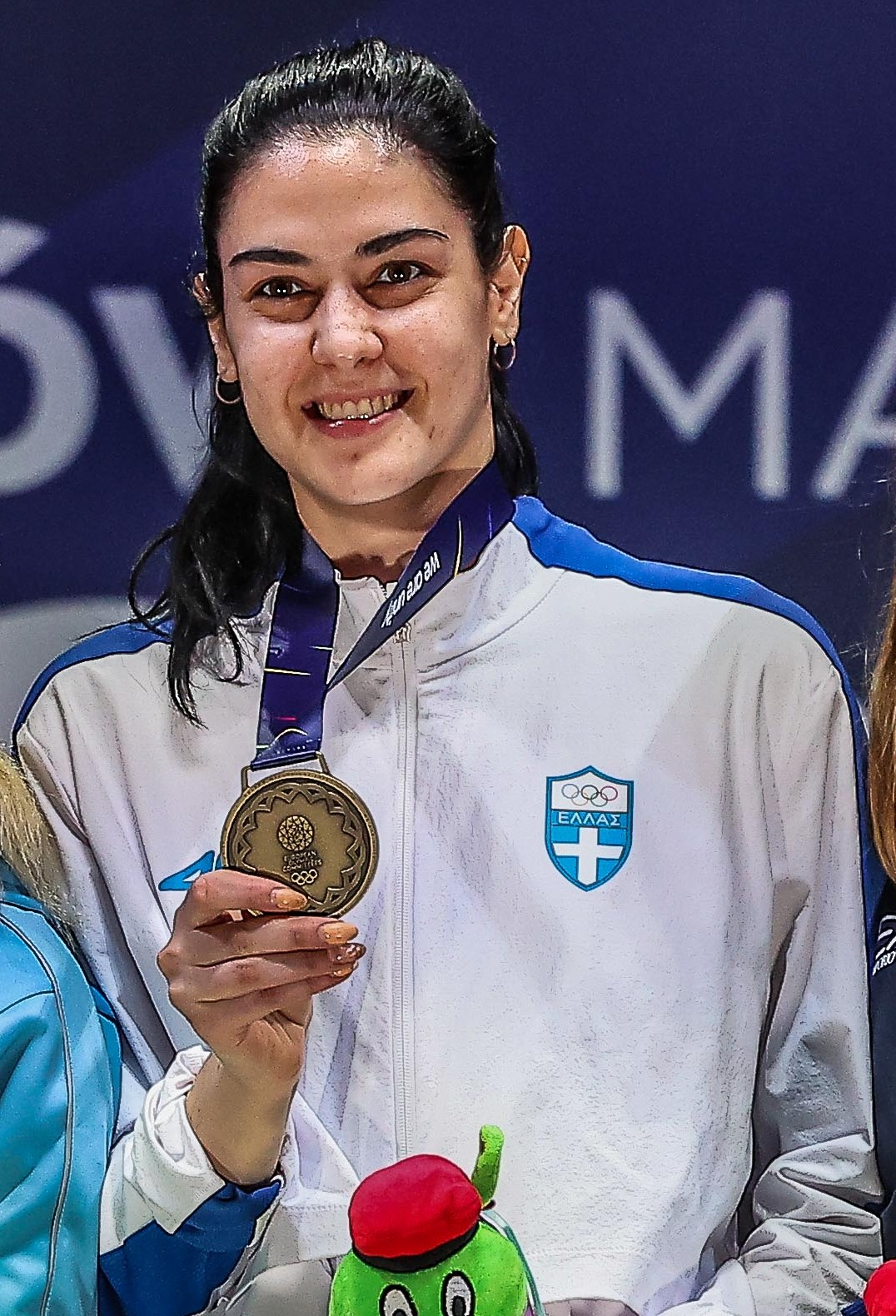
- Gkountoura at the 2023 European Games

Personal information
- Born: 14 March 1997 (age 29) Athens, Greece
- Height: 184 cm (6 ft 0 in)

Fencing career
- Sport: Fencing
- Country: Greece
- Weapon: Sabre
- Hand: right-handed
- Club: A.O. Ariston Paianias
- Highest ranking: 3rd (sabre, 2023)
- Current ranking: current ranking
Medal record
Women's sabre
Representing Greece
World Championships
Bronze medal – third place	2019 Budapest	Individual
Bronze medal – third place	2023 Milan	Individual
European Games
Bronze medal – third place	2023 Kraków	Individual
European Championships
Bronze medal – third place	2023 Plovdiv	Individual

Theodora Gkountoura (Greek: Θεοδώρα Γκουντούρα; born 14 March 1997) is a Greek sabre fencer.

She participated at the 2019 World Fencing Championships, winning a bronze medal. She won again the bronze medal at the 2023 World Fencing Championships, defeated in the semi-final by the world champion Misaki Emura by 15–14.

She has won the silver medal in the Orléans Grand Prix 2021 and the gold medal in the Grand Prix of Seoul in 2023.

As for the World Cup, she has won the bronze medal in Athens in 2020, the silver medal in Tbilisi in 2022, the bronze medal in Algiers in 2022, the silver medal in Tashkent in 2023, the bronze medal in Athens in 2023, the bronze medal in Sint-Niklaas in 2023, the bronze medal in Algiers in 2023 and the bronze medal in Sint-Niklaas in 2024.

She has also won the bronze medal at the individual women's sabre event of the 2023 European Games

So far, she has reached a career highest ranking of 3rd place in the 2021–2022 season.

She has been a fencing athlete of AEK multi-sport club, but she's currently an athlete of A.O. Ariston Paianias. She has been 4 times champion in sabre in Greece.

== Medal record ==
=== World Championship ===
Year	Location	Event	Position
2019	Budapest, Hungary	Individual Women's Sabre	3rd
2023	Milan, Italy	Individual Women's Sabre	3rd

=== Grand Prix ===
Year	Location	Event	Position
2021	Orléans, France	Individual Women's Sabre	2nd
2023	Seoul, South Korea	Individual Women's Sabre	1st

=== World Cup ===
Year	Location	Event	Position
2020	Athens, Greece	Individual Women's Sabre	3rd
2022	Tbilisi, Georgia	Individual Women's Sabre	2nd
2022	Algiers, Algeria	Individual Women's Sabre	3rd
2023	Tashkent, Uzbekistan	Individual Women's Sabre	2nd
2023	Athens, Greece	Individual Women's Sabre	3rd
2023	Sint-Niklaas, Belgium	Individual Women's Sabre	3rd
2023	Algiers, Algeria	Individual Women's Sabre	3rd
2024	Sint-Niklaas, Belgium	Individual Women's Sabre	3rd

=== European Games ===
Year	Location	Event	Position
2023	Kraków, Poland	Individual Women's Sabre	3rd

=== European Championship ===
Year	Location	Event	Position
2023	Plovdiv, Bulgaria	Individual Women's Sabre	3rd

=== National Championship ===
Year	Location	Event	Position
2016	OAKA, Athens	Individual Women's Sabre	2nd
2017	OAKA, Athens	Individual Women's Sabre	3rd
2018	OAKA, Athens	Individual Women's Sabre	1st
2019	OAKA, Athens	Individual Women's Sabre	1st
2020	OAKA, Athens	Individual Women's Sabre	1st
2021	OAKA, Athens	Individual Women's Sabre	1st

== Personal ==
Her paternal origin is from Krania, Elassona and her maternal hails from Garazo, Rethymno
