= 2018 European Fencing Championships =

- Host city: (Serbia) Novi Sad
- Dates: 16–21 June 2018
- Main venue: SPC Vojvodina
- Website: www.eurofencingns2018.com

The 2018 European Fencing Championships was held in Novi Sad, Serbia from 16 to 21 June 2018 at the SPC Vojvodina.

== Schedule ==
●	Opening Ceremony	●	Finals	●	Closing Ceremony

June	16	17	18	19	20	21	Total
Ceremonies	●					●	
Foil Individual	Men	Women					2
Épée Individual		Men	Women				2
Sabre Individual	Women		Men				2
Foil Team				Men	Women		2
Épée Team					Men	Women	2
Sabre Team				Women		Men	2
Total Gold Medals	2	2	2	2	2	2	12

== Medal summary ==
=== Men's events ===
Event	Gold	Silver	Bronze
Foil	Aleksey Cheremisinov; Russia	Daniele Garozzo; Italy	Alexander Choupenitch; Czech Republic
Foil	Aleksey Cheremisinov; Russia	Daniele Garozzo; Italy	Giorgio Avola; Italy
Épée	Yannick Borel; France	Nikolai Novosjolov; Estonia	Bohdan Nikishyn; Ukraine
Épée	Yannick Borel; France	Nikolai Novosjolov; Estonia	Richard Schmidt; Germany
Sabre	Max Hartung; Germany	Kamil Ibragimov; Russia	Dmitriy Danilenko; Russia
Sabre	Max Hartung; Germany	Kamil Ibragimov; Russia	Sandro Bazadze; Georgia
Team Foil	Russia; Timur Arslanov; Aleksey Cheremisinov; Timur Safin; Dmitry Zherebchenko	Italy; Giorgio Avola; Andrea Cassarà; Alessio Foconi; Daniele Garozzo	Poland; Krystian Gryglewski; Leszek Rajski; Andrzej Rządkowski; Michał Siess
Team Épée	Russia; Sergey Bida; Nikita Glazkov; Sergey Khodos; Pavel Sukhov	France; Yannick Borel; Alex Fava; Aymerick Gally; Ronan Gustin	Italy; Gabriele Cimini; Marco Fichera; Enrico Garozzo; Andrea Santarelli
Team Sabre	Hungary; Tamás Decsi; Csanád Gémesi; András Szatmári; Áron Szilágyi	Italy; Enrico Berrè; Luca Curatoli; Aldo Montano; Luigi Samele	Germany; Max Hartung; Richard Hübers; Matyas Szabo; Benedikt Wagner

=== Women's events ===
Event	Gold	Silver	Bronze
Foil	Inna Deriglazova; Russia	Arianna Errigo; Italy	Martyna Synoradzka; Poland
Foil	Inna Deriglazova; Russia	Arianna Errigo; Italy	Alice Volpi; Italy
Épée	Katrina Lehis; Estonia	Kristina Kuusk; Estonia	Violetta Kolobova; Russia
Épée	Katrina Lehis; Estonia	Kristina Kuusk; Estonia	Julia Beljajeva; Estonia
Sabre	Sofya Velikaya; Russia	Cécilia Berder; France	Marta Puda; Poland
Sabre	Sofya Velikaya; Russia	Cécilia Berder; France	Svetlana Sheveleva; Russia
Team Foil	Italy; Chiara Cini; Arianna Errigo; Camilla Mancini; Alice Volpi	Russia; Inna Deriglazova; Anastasia Ivanova; Marta Martyanova; Svetlana Tripapina	France; Anita Blaze; Astrid Guyart; Pauline Ranvier; Ysaora Thibus
Team Épée	France; Marie-Florence Candassamy; Laurence Épée; Auriane Mallo; Coraline Vitalis	Poland; Renata Knapik-Miazga; Ewa Nelip; Barbara Rutz; Aleksandra Zamachowska	Estonia; Julia Beljajeva; Irina Embrich; Erika Kirpu; Kristina Kuusk
Team Sabre	Russia; Yana Egorian; Sofia Pozdniakova; Svetlana Sheveleva; Sofya Velikaya	Ukraine; Yuliya Bakastova; Olga Kharlan; Alina Komashchuk; Olena Voronina	France; Cécilia Berder; Manon Brunet; Charlotte Lembach; Caroline Quéroli

== Medal table ==
Rank	Nation	Gold	Silver	Bronze	Total
1	Russia (RUS)	6	2	3	11
2	France (FRA)	2	2	2	6
3	Italy (ITA)	1	4	3	8
4	Estonia (EST)	1	2	2	5
5	Germany (GER)	1	0	2	3
6	Hungary (HUN)	1	0	0	1
7	Poland (POL)	0	1	3	4
8	Ukraine (UKR)	0	1	1	2
9	Czech Republic (CZE)	0	0	1	1
9	Georgia (GEO)	0	0	1	1
Totals (10 entries)		12	12	18	42

== Results ==
=== Men ===
==== Foil individual ====
Position	Name	Country
1st place, gold medalist(s)	Aleksey Cheremisinov	Russia
2nd place, silver medalist(s)	Daniele Garozzo	Italy
3rd place, bronze medalist(s)	Alexander Choupenitch	Czech Republic
3rd place, bronze medalist(s)	Giorgio Avola	Italy
5.	Dmitry Zherebchenko	Russia
5.	Andrea Cassarà	Italy
7.	Maxime Pauty	France
8.	Jérémy Cadot	France

Quarter-finals
(France) Jérémy Cadot	6
(Czech Republic) Alexander Choupenitch	15
(Russia) Dmitry Zherebchenko	7
(Italy) Daniele Garozzo	15
(Italy) Andrea Cassarà	12
(Russia) Aleksey Cheremisinov	15
(France) Maxime Pauty	14
(Italy) Giorgio Avola	15

Semi-finals
(Czech Republic) Alexander Choupenitch	11
(Italy) Daniele Garozzo	15
(Russia) Aleksey Cheremisinov	15
(Italy) Giorgio Avola	12

Final
(Italy) Daniele Garozzo	14
(Russia) Aleksey Cheremisinov	15

==== Épée individual ====
Position	Name	Country
1st place, gold medalist(s)	Yannick Borel	France
2nd place, silver medalist(s)	Nikolai Novosjolov	Estonia
3rd place, bronze medalist(s)	Bohdan Nikishyn	Ukraine
3rd place, bronze medalist(s)	Richard Schmidt	Germany
5.	Gabriele Cimini	Italy
6.	Niko Vuorinen	Finland
7.	Lukas Bellmann	Germany
8.	Patrick Jørgensen	Denmark

Quarter-finals
(Denmark) Patrick Jørgensen	14
(Estonia) Nikolai Novosjolov	15
(Germany) Lukas Bellmann	12
(Ukraine) Bohdan Nikishyn	15
(Finland) Niko Vuorinen	12
(Germany) Richard Schmidt	15
(France) Yannick Borel	15
(Italy) Gabriele Cimini	6

Semi-finals
(Estonia) Nikolai Novosjolov	10
(Ukraine) Bohdan Nikishyn	9
(Germany) Richard Schmidt	10
(France) Yannick Borel	15

Final
(Estonia) Nikolai Novosjolov	14
(France) Yannick Borel	15

==== Sabre individual ====
Position	Name	Country
1st place, gold medalist(s)	Max Hartung	Germany
2nd place, silver medalist(s)	Kamil Ibragimov	Russia
3rd place, bronze medalist(s)	Dmitriy Danilenko	Russia
3rd place, bronze medalist(s)	Sandro Bazadze	Georgia
5.	Áron Szilágyi	Hungary
5.	Tom Seitz	France
7.	Oleksiy Statsenko	Ukraine
8.	Luca Curatoli	Italy

Quarter-finals
(Germany) Max Hartung	15
(Hungary) Áron Szilágyi	14
(Georgia (country)) Sandro Bazadze	15
(Italy) Luca Curatoli	14
(Russia) Kamil Ibragimov	15
(Ukraine) Oleksiy Statsenko	13
(France) Tom Seitz	11
(Russia) Dmitriy Danilenko	15

Semi-finals
(Germany) Max Hartung	15
(Georgia (country)) Sandro Bazadze	14
(Russia) Kamil Ibragimov	15
(Russia) Dmitriy Danilenko	9

Final
(Germany) Max Hartung	15
(Russia) Kamil Ibragimov	12

==== Foil team ====
Position	Name	Country
1st place, gold medalist(s)	Timur Arslanov; Alexey Cheremisinov; Timur Safin; Dmitry Zherebchenko	Russia
2nd place, silver medalist(s)	Giorgio Avola; Andrea Cassara; Alessio Foconi; Daniele Garozzo	Italy
3rd place, bronze medalist(s)	Krystian Gryglewski; Leszek Rajski; Andrzej Rządkowski; Michał Siess	Poland
4.	Jeremy Cadot; Erwann Le Pechoux; Enzo Lefort; Maxime Pauty	France
5.	Peter Joppich; Alexander Kahl; Benjamin Kleibrink; Andre Sanita	Germany
6.	Dmytro Chuchukalo; Rostyslav Hertsyk; Andrii Pogrebniak; Klod Yunes	Ukraine
7.	Keith Cook; James-Andrew Davis; Marcus Mepstead; Ben Peggs	Great Britain
8.	Uladzislau Kurylovich; Uladzislau Lahunou; Pavel Prokharau; Artur Tsvetan	Belarus

Round of 16
Hungary	43
Great Britain	44
Poland	45
Belgium	27
Ireland	20
Germany	45
Russia	45
Serbia	25
Sweden	14
Ukraine	45
Denmark	40
Belarus	45

Quarter-finals
Italy	45
Great Britain	27
Poland	45
Germany	44
Russia	45
Ukraine	31
Belarus	23
France	45

Semi-finals
Italy	45
Poland	30
Russia	45
France	10

Final
Italy	38
Russia	45
Third place
Poland	45
France	39

==== Épée team ====
Position	Name	Country
1st place, gold medalist(s)	Sergey Bida; Nikita Glazkov; Sergey Khodos; Pavel Sukhov	Russia
2nd place, silver medalist(s)	Yannick Borel; Alex Fava; Aymerick Gally; Ronan Gustin	France
3rd place, bronze medalist(s)	Gabriele Cimini; Marco Fichera; Enrico Garozzo; Andrea Santarelli	Italy
4.	Max Heinzer; Lucas Malcotti; Michele Niggeler; Benjamin Steffen	Switzerland
5.	Bohdan Nikishyn; Ihor Reizlin; Volodymyr Stankevych; Roman Svichkar	Ukraine
6.	Nikolai Novosjolov; Sten Priinits; Jüri Salm; Peeter Turnau	Estonia
7.	Zsombor Bányai; Dániel Berta; András Peterdi; András Rédli	Hungary
8.	Grigori Beskin; Yuval Shalom Freilich; Ido Herpe; Daniel Lis	Israel

Round of 16
France	45
Finland	41
Estonia	45
Germany	41
Switzerland	45
Denmark	33
Sweden	29
Hungary	45
Italy	20
Poland	18
Spain	39
Ukraine	45
Czech Republic	39
Israel	42
Belgium	22
Russia	45

Quarter-finals
France	45
Estonia	29
Switzerland	42
Hungary	34
Italy	16
Ukraine	15
Israel	36
Russia	45

Semi-finals
France	45
Switzerland	27
Italy	40
Russia	45

Final
France	34
Russia	45
Third place
Switzerland	29
Italy	45

==== Sabre team ====
Position	Name	Country
1st place, gold medalist(s)	Tamás Decsi; Csanád Gémesi; András Szatmári; Áron Szilágyi	Hungary
2nd place, silver medalist(s)	Enrico Berrè; Luca Curatoli; Aldo Montano; Luigi Samele	Italy
3rd place, bronze medalist(s)	Max Hartung; Richard Hübers; Matyas Szabo; Benedikt Wagner	Germany
4.	Alin Badea; Tiberiu Dolniceanu; George Dragomir; Iulian Teodosiu	Romania
5.	Dmitry Danilenko; Kamil Ibragimov; Konstantin Lokhanov; Veniamin Reshetnikov	Russia
6.	Vincent Anstett; Bolade Apithy; Maxence Lambert; Tom Seitz	France
7.	Dmytro Pundyk; Oleksiy Statsenko; Yuriy Tsap; Andriy Yagodka	Ukraine
8.	Beka Bazadze; Sandro Bazadze; Mikheil Mardaleishvili; Nika Shengelia	Georgia

Round of 16
Belarus	36
Georgia	45
France	45
Poland	37
Serbia	5
Romania	45
Ukraine	45
Great Britain	40

Quarter-finals
Italy	45
Georgia	41
France	38
Germany	45
Russia	42
Romania	45
Ukraine	25
Hungary	45

Semi-finals
Italy	45
Germany	44
Romania	37
Hungary	45

Final
Italy	33
Hungary	45
Third place
Germany	45
Romania	43

=== Women ===
==== Foil individual ====
Position	Name	Country
1st place, gold medalist(s)	Inna Deriglazova	Russia
2nd place, silver medalist(s)	Arianna Errigo	Italy
3rd place, bronze medalist(s)	Martyna Synoradzka	Poland
3rd place, bronze medalist(s)	Alice Volpi	Italy
5.	Anne Sauer	Germany
6.	Marta Martyanova	Russia
7.	Fanny Kreiss	Hungary
8.	Astrid Guyart	France

Quarter-finals
(Russia) Marta Martyanova	14
(Poland) Martyna Synoradzka	15
(France) Astrid Guyart	8
(Russia) Inna Deriglazova	15
(Italy) Arianna Errigo	15
(Germany) Anne Sauer	8
(Italy) Alice Volpi	15
(Hungary) Fanny Kreiss	4

Semi-finals
(Poland) Martyna Synoradzka	4
(Russia) Inna Deriglazova	10
(Italy) Arianna Errigo	15
(Italy) Alice Volpi	8

Final
(Russia) Inna Deriglazova	15
(Italy) Arianna Errigo	9

==== Épée individual ====
Position	Name	Country
1st place, gold medalist(s)	Katrina Lehis	Estonia
2nd place, silver medalist(s)	Kristina Kuusk	Estonia
3rd place, bronze medalist(s)	Julia Beljajeva	Estonia
3rd place, bronze medalist(s)	Violetta Kolobova	Russia
5.	Olena Kryvytska	Ukraine
6.	Ana Maria Popescu	Romania
7.	Ewa Nelip	Poland
8.	Renata Knapik-Miazga	Poland

Quarter-finals
(Ukraine) Olena Kryvytska	14
(Estonia) Kristina Kuusk	15
(Estonia) Julia Beljajeva	15
(Romania) Ana Maria Popescu	9
(Poland) Renata Knapik-Miazga	13
(Estonia) Katrina Lehis	15
(Russia) Violetta Kolobova	15
(Poland) Ewa Nelip	9

Semi-finals
(Estonia) Kristina Kuusk	15
(Estonia) Julia Beljajeva	7
(Estonia) Katrina Lehis	14
(Russia) Violetta Kolobova	13

Final
(Estonia) Kristina Kuusk	14
(Estonia) Katrina Lehis	15

==== Sabre individual ====
Position	Name	Country
1st place, gold medalist(s)	Sofya Velikaya	Russia
2nd place, silver medalist(s)	Cécilia Berder	France
3rd place, bronze medalist(s)	Marta Puda	Poland
3rd place, bronze medalist(s)	Svetlana Sheveleva	Russia
5.	Araceli Navarro	Spain
6.	Bianca Pascu	Romania
7.	Theodora Goudoura	Greece
8.	Alina Komashchuk	Ukraine

Quarter-finals
(Russia) Sofya Velikaya	15
(Spain) Araceli Navarro	6
(Poland) Marta Puda	15
(Greece) Theodora Goudoura	12
(Russia) Svetlana Sheveleva	15
(Romania) Bianca Pascu	12
(Ukraine) Alina Komashchuk	8
(France) Cécilia Berder	15

Semi-finals
(Russia) Sofya Velikaya	15
(Poland) Marta Puda	6
(Russia) Svetlana Sheveleva	9
(France) Cécilia Berder	15

Final
(Russia) Sofya Velikaya	15
(France) Cécilia Berder	10

==== Foil team ====
Position	Name	Country
1st place, gold medalist(s)	Chiara Cini; Arianna Errigo; Camilla Mancini; Alice Volpi	Italy
2nd place, silver medalist(s)	Inna Deriglazova; Anastasia Ivanova; Marta Martyanova; Svetlana Tripapina	Russia
3rd place, bronze medalist(s)	Anita Blaze; Astrid Guyart; Pauline Ranvier; Ysaora Thibus	France
4.	Leandra Behr; Leonie Ebert; Eva Hampel; Anne Sauer	Germany
5.	Martyna Jelińska; Hanna Łyczbińska; Martyna Synoradzka; Julia Walczyk	Poland
6.	Fanni Kreiss; Dóra Lupkovics; Aida Mohamed; Szonja Szalai	Hungary
7.	Kateryna Chentsova; Anastasiya Moskovska; Alexandra Senyuta; Anna Taranenko	Ukraine
8.	Andrea Breteau; María Teresa Díaz; María Mariño; Bárbara Ojeda	Spain

Round of 16
Ukraine	45
Sweden	21
Hungary	45
Serbia	20
Great Britain	30
Poland	45
Spain	45
Romania	38

Quarter-finals
Italy	45
Ukraine	26
Hungary	41
Germany	45
France	45
Poland	36
Spain	21
Russia	42

Semi-finals
Italy	45
Germany	26
France	31
Russia	45

Final
Italy	41
Russia	40
Third place
Germany	26
France	45

==== Épée team ====
Position	Name	Country
1st place, gold medalist(s)	Marie-Florence Candassamy; Laurence Épée; Auriane Mallo; Coraline Vitalis	France
2nd place, silver medalist(s)	Renata Knapik-Miazga; Ewa Nelip; Barbara Rutz; Aleksandra Zamachowska	Poland
3rd place, bronze medalist(s)	Julia Beljajeva; Irina Embrich; Erika Kirpu; Kristina Kuusk	Estonia
4.	Dzhoan Feybi Bezhura; Olena Kryvytska; Kseniya Pantelyeyeva; Anfisa Pochkalova	Ukraine
5.	Rossella Fiamingo; Mara Navarria; Giulia Rizzi; Alberta Santuccio	Italy
6.	Tatyana Andryushina; Tatyana Gudkova; Violetta Kolobova; Aizanat Murtazaeva	Russia
7.	Beate Christmann; Alexandra Ehler; Alexandra Ndolo; Monika Sozanska	Germany
8.	Ana Maria Popescu; Raluca Cristina Sbarcia; Amalia Tătăran; Maria Udrea	Romania

Round of 16
Russia	45
Serbia	19
Hungary	31
Ukraine	34
Germany	45
Sweden	40
Finland	34
Poland	45
France	45
Switzerland	38
Israel	29
Italy	45
Romania	45
Spain	27
Great Britain	26
Estonia	45

Quarter-finals
Russia	42
Ukraine	43
Germany	36
Poland	45
France	45
Italy	35
Romania	23
Estonia	24

Semi-finals
Ukraine	37
Poland	45
France	45
Estonia	36

Final
Poland	40
France	41
Third place
Ukraine	37
Estonia	42

==== Sabre team ====
Position	Name	Country
1st place, gold medalist(s)	Yana Egorian; Sofia Pozdniakova; Svetlana Sheveleva; Sofya Velikaya	Russia
2nd place, silver medalist(s)	Yuliia Bakastova; Olga Kharlan; Alina Komashchuk; Olena Voronina	Ukraine
3rd place, bronze medalist(s)	Cécilia Berder; Manon Brunet; Charlotte Lembach; Caroline Quéroli	France
4.	Martina Criscio; Rossella Gregorio; Loreta Gulotta; Irene Vecchi	Italy
5.	Sandra Marcos; Lucía Martin-Portugués; Araceli Navarro; Laia Vila	Spain
6.	Martyna Komisarczyk; Małgorzata Kozaczuk; Aleksandra Shelton; Angelika Wątor	Poland
7.	Renata Katona; Luca László; Anna Márton; Liza Pusztai	Hungary
8.	Julika Funke; Lisa Gette; Lea Krüger; Anna Limbach	Germany

Round of 16
Turkey	34
Poland	45
Ukraine	45
Great Britain	27
Serbia	12
Hungary	45
Bulgaria	42
Spain	45
Belarus	37
Germany	45

Quarter-finals
Italy	45
Poland	41
Ukraine	45
Hungary	41
Russia	45
Spain	36
Germany	30
France	45

Semi-finals
Italy	42
Ukraine	45
Russia	45
France	42

Final
Ukraine	30
Russia	45
Third place
Italy	44
France	45
