= 2017 World Cadets and Juniors Fencing Championships =

2017 Junior World Fencing Championships
- Dates: 1–10 April 2017
- Host city: Plovdiv, Bulgaria
- Venue: International Fair Plovdiv
- Events: 19

The 2017 Junior World Fencing Championships were held in Plovdiv, Bulgaria at the International Fair Plovdiv from 1 to 10 April.

== Medal summary ==
=== Junior events ===
==== Men's events ====
Event	Gold	Silver	Bronze
Épée	Egor Guzhiev (RUS)	Valerio Cuomo (ITA)	Gergely Siklósi (HUN); Cosimo Martini (ITA)
Foil	Cheung Ka Long (HKG)	Toshiya Saito (JPN)	Iskander Akhmetov (RUS); Guillaume Bianchi (ITA)
Sabre	Konstantin Lokhanov (RUS)	Yang Lu (CHN)	Dario Cavaliere (ITA); Karol Metryka (USA)
Team Épée	Italy; Gianpaolo Buzzacchino; Valerio Cuomo; Cosimo Martini; Federico Vismara	Poland; Maciej Bielec; Wojciech Lubieniecki; Damian Michalak; Bartosz Staszulonek	Hungary; Tibor Andrásfi; Patrik Esztergályos; Máté Tamás Koch; Gergely Siklósi
Team Foil	United States; Nick Itkin; Sidarth Kumbla; Samuel Moelis; Geoffrey Tourette	Japan; Takuma Ito; Toshiya Saito; Takahiro Shikine; Kenta Suzumura	Russia; Iskander Akhmetov; Kirill Borodachev; Grigoriy Semenyuk; Alexander Sirotkin
Team Sabre	Russia; Andrey Gladkov; Anatoliy Kostenko; Konstantin Lokhanov; Vladislav Pozdnyakov	Italy; Gherardo Caranti; Dario Cavaliere; Leonardo Dreossi; Matteo Neri	Germany; Raoul Bonah; Luis Bonah; Lorenz Kempf; Frederic Kindler

==== Women's events ====
Event	Gold	Silver	Bronze
Épée	Aliya Bayram (FRA)	Catherine Nixon (USA)	Federica Isola (ITA); Xu Nuo (CHN)
Foil	Komaki Kikuchi (JPN)	Serena Rossini (ITA)	Iman Blow (USA); Ali Huang (CHN)
Sabre	Natalia Botello (MEX)	Theodora Gkountoura (GRE)	Liza Pusztai (HUN); Olga Nikitina (RUS)
Team Épée	France; Aliya Bayram; Camille Nabeth; Oceane Tahe; Diane von Kerssenbrock	Italy; Alessandra Bozza; Beatrice Cagnin; Eleonora De Marchi; Federica Isola	United States; Greta Candreva; Ariana Mangano; Catherine Nixon; Giana Vierheller
Team Foil	Poland; Julia Chrzanowska; Renata Tomczak; Julia Walczyk; Beata Zurowska	United States; Sylvia Binder; Iman Blow; Elyssa Kleiner; Sabrina Massialas	Hungary; Csilla Kókai; Kata Kondricz; Flóra Pásztor; Janka Tóth
Team Sabre	Russia; Olga Nikitina; Evgenia Podpaskova; Sofia Pozdniakova; Svetlana Sheveleva	Italy; Michela Battiston; Chiara Crovari; Lucia Lucarini; Eloisa Passaro	Mexico; Natalia Botello; Kin Escamilla; Julieta Toledo; Abigail Valdez Andrade

=== Cadet events ===
==== Men's events ====
Event	Gold	Silver	Bronze
Épée	Davide Di Veroli (ITA)	Ryan Griffiths (USA)	Rafael Zagitov (RUS); Jonathan Piskovatskov (USA)
Foil	Kirill Borodachev (RUS)	Vladilav Mylnikov (RUS)	Ivan Troshin (RUS); Alessio Di Tommaso (ITA)
Sabre	Ibrahim Ahmed Acar (TUR)	Christopher Walker (USA)	Nikita Presnov (RUS); Lim Jaeyoon (KOR)

==== Women's events ====
Event	Gold	Silver	Bronze
Épée	Aizanat Murtazaeva (RUS)	Tamara Gnám (HUN)	Anna Voufalova (CZE); Renáta Petri (HUN)
Foil	Adelina Bikbulatova (RUS)	Nóra Hajas (HUN)	Amita Berthier (SGP); Natalie Minarik (USA)
Sabre	Liza Pusztai (HUN)	Alina Klyuchnikova (RUS)	Natalia Botello (MEX); Elizabeth Tartakovsky (USA)

==== Mixed events ====
Event	Gold	Silver	Bronze
Team Mixed 3-Weapon	Russia; Adelina Bikbulatova; Kirill Borodachev; Igor Korovin; Anna Kudryaeva; Aizanat Murtazaeva; Prokhor Svitich; Rafael Zagitov	Canada; Blake Broszus; François Cauchon; Jane Caulfield; Fynn Fafard; Marina Guintchitskaia; Seraphim Hsieh Jarov; Ariane Leonard	South Korea; An Taeyeong; Choi Yumin; Jeon Hayoung; Kim Gaeun; Kim Munkwan; Kim Tae Hwan; Lim Jaeyoon

== Medal table ==
Rank	Nation	Gold	Silver	Bronze	Total
1	Russia	8	2	6	16
2	Italy	2	5	5	12
3	France	2	0	0	2
4	United States	1	4	6	11
5	Hungary	1	2	3	6
6	Japan	1	2	0	3
7	Poland	1	1	0	2
8	Mexico	1	0	2	3
9	Hong Kong	1	0	0	1
9	Turkey	1	0	0	1
11	China	0	1	2	3
12	Canada	0	1	0	1
12	Greece	0	1	0	1
14	South Korea	0	0	2	2
15	Czech Republic	0	0	1	1
15	Germany	0	0	1	1
15	Singapore	0	0	1	1
Totals (17 entries)		19	19	29	67
