= Men's foil at the 2017 World Fencing Championships =

- Venue: Arena Leipzig
- Location: Leipzig, Germany
- Dates: 23 July

Medalists
gold medal	Dmitry Zherebchenko	Russia
silver medal	Toshiya Saito	Japan
bronze medal	Daniele Garozzo	Italy
bronze medal	Takahiro Shikine	Japan

The Men's foil event of the 2017 World Fencing Championships was held on 23 July 2017. The qualification was held on 20 July 2017.

== Draw ==
=== Finals ===
Semi-finals
(Italy) Daniele Garozzo	12
(Japan) Toshiya Saito	15
(Japan) Takahiro Shikine	12
(Russia) Dmitry Zherebchenko	15

Final
(Japan) Toshiya Saito	12
(Russia) Dmitry Zherebchenko	15

=== Top half ===
==== Section 1 ====
Round of 64
1	(Italy) Daniele Garozzo	15
64	(Austria) Tobias Reichetzer	3
33	(Poland) Piotr Janda	7
32	(Japan) Kenta Suzumura	15
17	(Brazil) Guilherme Toldo	14
48	(Hong Kong) Cheung Siu Lun	15
49	(Germany) Alexander Kahl	10
16	(South Korea) Ha Tae-gyu	15
9	(France) Erwann Le Péchoux	7
56	(Japan) Kyosuke Matsuyama	15
41	(Denmark) Kolja Dahlin	8
24	(Germany) André Sanita	15
25	(Egypt) Mohamed Essam	15
40	(Netherlands) Sebastiaan Borst	14
57	(France) Jérémy Cadot	2
8	(United States) Race Imboden	15

Round of 32
1	(Italy) Daniele Garozzo	15
32	(Japan) Kenta Suzumura	8
48	(Hong Kong) Cheung Siu Lun	14
16	(South Korea) Ha Tae-gyu	15
56	(Japan) Kyosuke Matsuyama	10
24	(Germany) André Sanita	15
25	(Egypt) Mohamed Essam	5
8	(United States) Race Imboden	15

Round of 16
1	(Italy) Daniele Garozzo	15
16	(South Korea) Ha Tae-gyu	6
24	(Germany) André Sanita	14
8	(United States) Race Imboden	15

Quarterfinals
1	(Italy) Daniele Garozzo	15
8	(United States) Race Imboden	14

==== Section 2 ====
Round of 64
5	(United Kingdom) Richard Kruse	15
60	(Hong Kong) Nicholas E. Choi	4
37	(Turkey) Martino Minuto	15
28	(Czech Republic) Alexander Choupenitch	12
21	(Australia) Sholto Douglas	15
44	(Netherlands) Daniel Giacon	11
53	(United Kingdom) Marcus Mepstead	12
12	(United States) Gerek Meinhardt	15
13	(Germany) Peter Joppich	15
52	(Cyprus) Alex Tofalides	12
45	(Croatia) Petar Fileš	7
20	(Japan) Toshiya Saito	15
29	(Mexico) Daniel Gómez	15
36	(Ukraine) Andrii Pogrebniak	13
61	(Georgia (country)) Luka Gaganidze	8
4	(Russia) Timur Safin	15

Round of 32
5	(United Kingdom) Richard Kruse	15
37	(Turkey) Martino Minuto	5
21	(Australia) Sholto Douglas	7
12	(United States) Gerek Meinhardt	15
13	(Germany) Peter Joppich	5
20	(Japan) Toshiya Saito	15
29	(Mexico) Daniel Gómez	6
4	(Russia) Timur Safin	15

Round of 16
5	(United Kingdom) Richard Kruse	15
12	(United States) Gerek Meinhardt	7
20	(Japan) Toshiya Saito	15
4	(Russia) Timur Safin	14

Quarterfinals
5	(United Kingdom) Richard Kruse	11
20	(Japan) Toshiya Saito	15

=== Bottom half ===
==== Section 3 ====
Round of 64
3	(Italy) Giorgio Avola	15
62	(Canada) Marc-Antoine Brodeur	4
35	(Japan) Takahiro Shikine	15
30	(Spain) Carlos Llavador	13
19	(Russia) Timur Arslanov	15
46	(Ivory Coast) Jérémy Keryhuel	5
51	(Greece) Nikolaos Kontochristopoulos	3
14	(Egypt) Alaaeldin Abouelkassem	15
11	(Italy) Andrea Cassarà	15
54	(Slovakia) Cedrik Serri	8
43	(France) Julien Mertine	12
22	(Hungary) Dániel Dósa	15
27	(Germany) Benjamin Kleibrink	14
38	(South Korea) Heo Jun	13
59	(China) Huang Mengkai	5
6	(Italy) Alessio Foconi	15

Round of 32
3	(Italy) Giorgio Avola	14
35	(Japan) Takahiro Shikine	15
19	(Russia) Timur Arslanov	15
14	(Egypt) Alaaeldin Abouelkassem	7
11	(Italy) Andrea Cassarà	15
22	(Hungary) Dániel Dósa	8
27	(Germany) Benjamin Kleibrink	6
6	(Italy) Alessio Foconi	15

Round of 16
35	(Japan) Takahiro Shikine	15
19	(Russia) Timur Arslanov	3
11	(Italy) Andrea Cassarà	14
6	(Italy) Alessio Foconi	15

Quarterfinals
35	(Japan) Takahiro Shikine	15
6	(Italy) Alessio Foconi	13

==== Section 4 ====
Round of 64
7	(United States) Miles Chamley-Watson	15
58	(Ukraine) Dmytro Chuchukalo	14
39	(United Kingdom) James-Andrew Davis	11
26	(Russia) Aleksey Cheremisinov	15
23	(Hong Kong) Choi Chun Yin Ryan	15
42	(Denmark) Thomas Berg	14
55	(Russia) Dmitry Zherebchenko	15
10	(Hong Kong) Cheung Ka Long	10
15	(France) Enzo Lefort	15
50	(Poland) Leszek Rajski	12
47	(Denmark) Alexander Tsoronis	15
18	(South Korea) Son Young-ki	6
31	(Austria) René Pranz	7
34	(China) Li Chen	15
63	(Belgium) Stef Van Campenhout	3
2	(United States) Alex Massialas	15

Round of 32
7	(United States) Miles Chamley-Watson	13
26	(Russia) Aleksey Cheremisinov	15
23	(Hong Kong) Choi Chun Yin Ryan	11
55	(Russia) Dmitry Zherebchenko	15
15	(France) Enzo Lefort	15
47	(Denmark) Alexander Tsoronis	11
34	(China) Li Chen	9
2	(United States) Alex Massialas	15

Round of 16
26	(Russia) Aleksey Cheremisinov	11
55	(Russia) Dmitry Zherebchenko	15
15	(France) Enzo Lefort	5
2	(United States) Alex Massialas	15

Quarterfinals
55	(Russia) Dmitry Zherebchenko	15
2	(United States) Alex Massialas	8
