= Toshiya Saito =

Japanese fencer (born 1997)

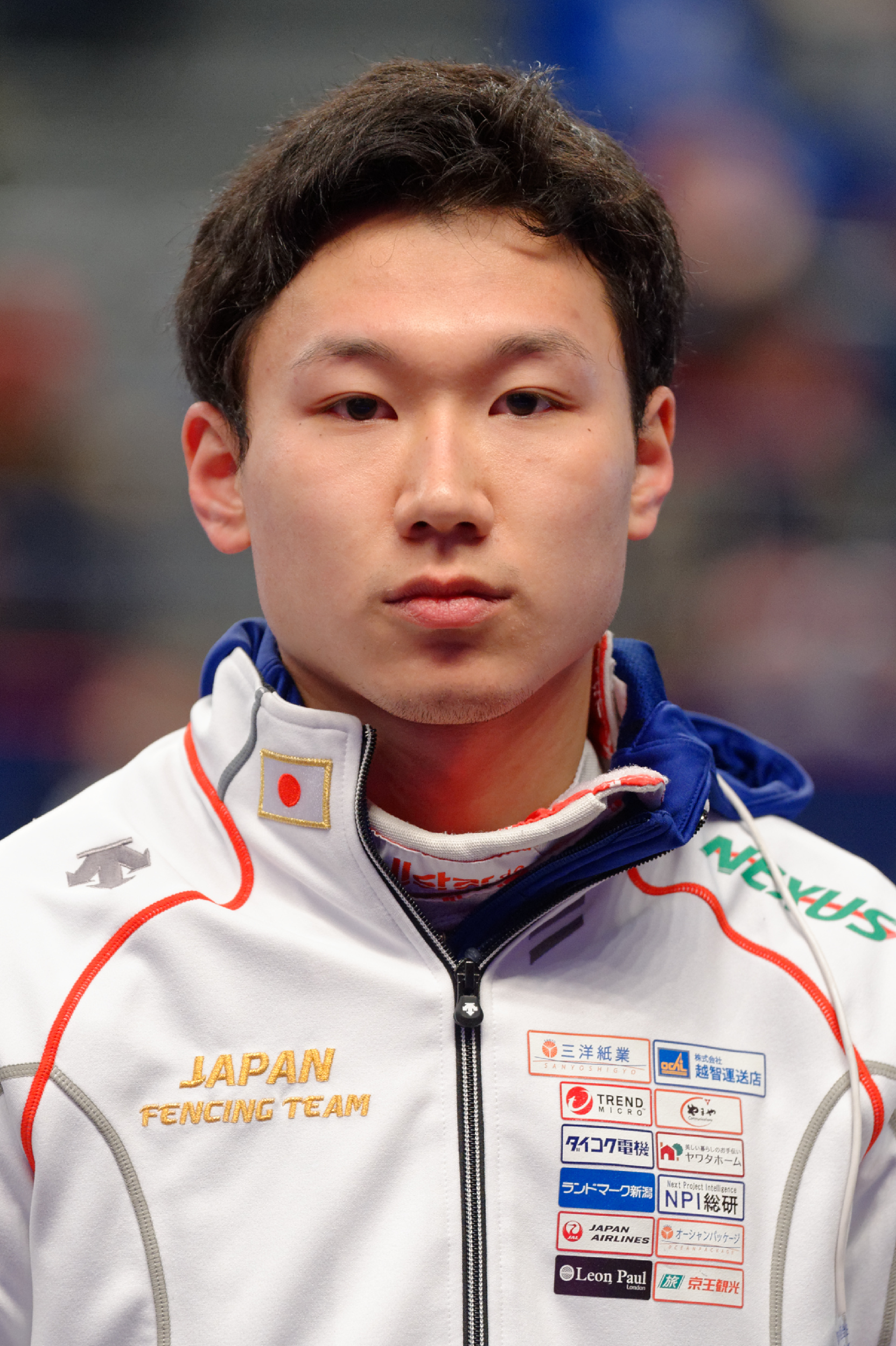

Personal information
- Born: 29 May 1997 (age 29)

Fencing career
- Sport: Fencing
- Country: Japan
- Hand: Right-handed
Medal record
Men's foil fencing
Representing Japan
World Championships
Silver medal – second place	2017 Leipzig	Individual
Asian Games
Gold medal – first place	2026 Aichi-Nagoya	Team
Bronze medal – third place	2018 Jakarta	Team
Junior World Championships
Silver medal – second place	2017 Plovdiv	Individual
Silver medal – second place	2017 Plovdiv	Team
Summer Universiade
Gold medal – first place	2017 Taipei	Team

Toshiya Saito (西藤俊哉, Saitō Toshiya; born 29 May 1997) is a Japanese foil fencer.

He won the individual silver medal at World Championships in 2017.
