= Dmitry Zherebchenko =

Russian fencer (born 1989)

Personal information
- Full name: Dmitry Anatolyevich Zherebchenko
- Born: 27 June 1989 (age 37) Kurchatov, Soviet Union
- Height: 1.85 m (6 ft 1 in)
- Weight: 77 kg (170 lb)

Fencing career
- Sport: Fencing
- Country: Russia
- Weapon: Foil
- Hand: Left-handed
- Club: CSKA (Central Sports Army Club) [RUS]; Khimki Fencing Sports School of Olympic Reserve [RUS]
- Head coach: Lidia Safiullina (first coach); Ildar Mavlyutov, Ilgar Mamedov
- FIE ranking: current ranking
Medal record
Men's fencing
Representing Russia
World Championships
Gold medal – first place	2017 Leipzig	Individual foil
Bronze medal – third place	2018 Wuxi	Team foil
Bronze medal – third place	2019 Budapest	Individual foil
European Games
Bronze medal – third place	2015 Baku	Team foil
European Championships
Gold medal – first place	2018 Novi Sad	Team foil
Silver medal – second place	2017 Tbilisi	Team foil
Summer Universiade
Gold medal – first place	2009 Belgrad	Team foil
Military World Games
Gold medal – first place	2019 Wuhan	Team foil

Dmitry Anatolyevich Zherebchenko (Russian: Дмитрий Анатольевич Жеребченко; born 27 June 1989) is a Russian foil fencer, gold medallist in the 2017 World Championships. Zherebchenko was a substitute for Russia's foil team which took gold at the 2016 Summer Olympics in Rio de Janeiro, but as he did not fence in the competition he was not deemed an Olympian and did not receive a medal. His clubs are the Central Sports Army Club [RUS], and the Khimki Fencing Sports School of Olympic Reserve [RUS].
