= Women's team sabre at the 2019 World Fencing Championships =

- Venue: SYMA Sports and Conference Centre
- Location: Budapest, Hungary
- Dates: 22–23 July

Medalists
gold medal	Yana Egorian; Olga Nikitina; Sofia Pozdniakova; Sofya Velikaya	Russia
silver medal	Cécilia Berder; Manon Brunet; Charlotte Lembach; Caroline Queroli	France
bronze medal	Choi Soo-yeon; Hwang Seon-a; Kim Ji-yeon; Yoon Ji-su	South Korea

The Women's team sabre competition at the 2019 World Fencing Championships was held on 22 and 23 July 2019.

== Draw ==
=== Finals ===
Semifinals
France	45
South Korea	43
Italy	37
Russia	45

Final
France	40
Russia	45
Third place
South Korea	45
Italy	35

=== Top half ===
==== Section 1 ====
Round of 32
Turkey	45
Venezuela	36
Japan	45
Singapore	28
Thailand	22
Ukraine	45

Round of 16
France	45
Turkey	24
Japan	34
Ukraine	45

Quarterfinals
France	45
Ukraine	34

==== Section 2 ====
Round of 32
South Korea	45
Bulgaria	24
Iran	38
Germany	45
Canada	45
Tunisia	28
Uzbekistan	39
United States	45

Round of 16
South Korea	45
Germany	39
Canada	32
United States	45

Quarterfinals
South Korea	45
United States	39

=== Bottom half ===
==== Section 3 ====
Round of 32
Italy	45
Vietnam	27
Kazakhstan	44
Hong Kong	45
Poland	45
Colombia	42
Romania	21
Hungary	45

Round of 16
Italy	45
Hong Kong	28
Poland	41
Hungary	45

Quarterfinals
Italy	45
Hungary	38

==== Section 4 ====
Round of 32
China	45
Mexico	37
Egypt	43
Spain	45
Azerbaijan	45
Great Britain	38
Georgia	34
Russia	45

Round of 16
China	45
Spain	42
Azerbaijan	38
Russia	45

Quarterfinals
China	28
Russia	45

=== Placement rounds ===
==== 5–8th place bracket ====
5–8th place semifinals
Ukraine	45
United States	38
Hungary	45
China	41

Fifth place
Ukraine	40
Hungary	45
Seventh place
United States	45
China	32

==== 9–16th place bracket ====
9–16th place quarterfinals
Turkey	26
Japan	45
Germany	45
Canada	42
Hong Kong	24
Poland	45
Spain	45
Azerbaijan	37

9–12th place semifinals
Japan	45
Germany	31
Poland	45
Spain	39

Ninth place
Japan	45
Poland	34
Eleventh place
Germany	45
Spain	43

==== 13–16th place bracket ====
13–16th place semifinals
Turkey	45
Canada	27
Hong Kong	31
Azerbaijan	45

13th place
Turkey	45
Azerbaijan	38
15th place
Canada	45
Hong Kong	41

== Final ranking ==
Rank	Team
1st place, gold medalist(s)	Russia
2nd place, silver medalist(s)	France
3rd place, bronze medalist(s)	South Korea
4	Italy
5	Hungary
6	Ukraine
7	United States
8	China
9	Japan
10	Poland
11	Germany
12	Spain
13	Turkey
14	Azerbaijan
15	Canada
16	Hong Kong
17	Venezuela
18	Great Britain
19	Kazakhstan
20	Tunisia
21	Iran
22	Colombia
23	Egypt
24	Singapore
25	Thailand
26	Mexico
27	Romania
28	Bulgaria
29	Uzbekistan
30	Vietnam
31	Georgia
