= Men's team foil at the 2018 World Fencing Championships =

- Venue: Wuxi Sports Center Indoor Stadium
- Location: Wuxi, China
- Dates: 26 July; 27 July
- Competitors: 88 from 22 nations

Medalists
gold medal	Giorgio Avola; Andrea Cassarà; Alessio Foconi; Daniele Garozzo	Italy
silver medal	Miles Chamley-Watson; Race Imboden; Alexander Massialas; Gerek Meinhardt	United States
bronze medal	Timur Arslanov; Aleksey Cheremisinov; Timur Safin; Dmitry Zherebchenko	Russia

The Men's team foil event of the 2018 World Fencing Championships was held on 26 and 27 July 2018.

== Draw ==
=== Finals ===
Semifinals
United States	45
Russia	29
South Korea	30
Italy	45

Final
United States	34
Italy	45
Third place
Russia	45
South Korea	35

=== Top half ===
==== Section 1 ====
Round of 32
Brazil	43
Hungary	45
China	45
FIE	22
Chinese Taipei	23
Germany	45

Round of 16
United States	45
Hungary	26
China	45
Germany	44

Quarterfinals
United States	45
China	19

==== Section 2 ====
Round of 32
Singapore	29
Great Britain	45
Hong Kong	45
Belgium	34

Round of 16
France	45
Great Britain	26
Hong Kong	28
Russia	45

Quarterfinals
France	36
Russia	45

=== Bottom half ===
==== Section 3 ====
Round of 32
Canada	41
Denmark	45
Egypt
Algeria	w/o
Iraq	14
Japan	45

Round of 16
South Korea	45
Denmark	28
Egypt	32
Japan	45

Quarterfinals
South Korea	45
Japan	35

==== Section 4 ====
Round of 32
Ukraine	45
Philippines	22
Colombia	3
Poland	45
Australia	45
Chile	37

Round of 16
Ukraine	43
Poland	45
Australia	34
Italy	45

Quarterfinals
Poland	23
Italy	45

=== Placement rounds ===
==== 5–8th place bracket ====
5–8th place semifinals
China	31
France	45
Japan	39
Poland	45

Fifth place
France	45
Poland	4ß
Seventh place
China	30
Japan	45

==== 9–16th place bracket ====
9–16th place quarterfinals
Hungary	45
Germany	40
Great Britain	45
Hong Kong	35
Denmark	41
Egypt	45
Ukraine	41
Australia	45

9–12th place semifinals
Hungary	38
Great Britain	45
Egypt	45
Australia	28

Ninth place
Great Britain	40
Egypt	41
Eleventh place
Hungary	45
Australia	44

==== 13–16th place bracket ====
13–16th place semifinals
Germany	42
Hong Kong	45
Denmark	45
Ukraine	35

13th place
Hong Kong	45
Denmark	26
15th place
Germany	45
Ukraine	32
