= Marta Martyanova =

Russian foil fencer

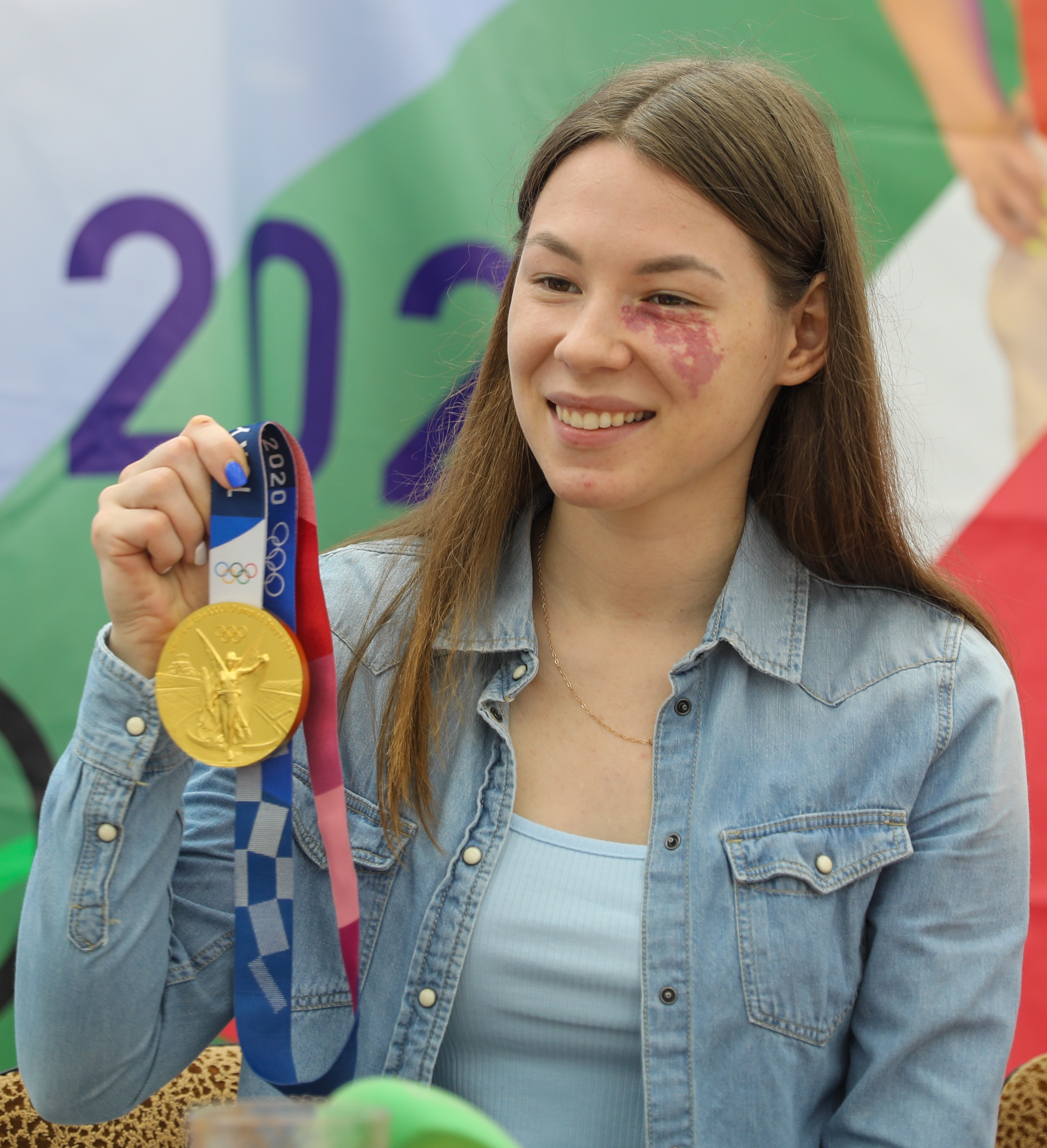
- Martyanova showing off her medal in 2021

Personal information
- Full name: Marta Valeryevna Martyanova
- Nationality: (Russia) Russian
- Born: 1 December 1998 (age 27) Kazan, Tatarstan, Russia
- Home town: Moscow, Russia
- Height: 1.74 m (5 ft 9 in)
- Weight: 62 kg (137 lb)

Fencing career
- Sport: Fencing
- Country: Russia
- Weapon: Foil
- Hand: Right-handed
- National coach: Artur Akhmatkhuzin, Elena Prokhorova
- Club: Dynamo Tatarstan
- Head coach: Ildar Mavlyutov
- FIE ranking: current ranking
Medal record
Women's fencing
Representing (Russia) ROC
Olympic Games
Gold medal – first place	2020 Tokyo	Team foil
Representing Russia
European Championships
Silver medal – second place	2017 Tbilisi	Team foil
Silver medal – second place	2018 Novi Sad	Team foil

Marta Valeryevna Martyanova (Russian: Марта Валерьевна Мартьянова, IPA: [ˈmartə mɐrˈtʲjanəvə]; born 1 December 1998) is a Russian right-handed foil fencer and 2021 team Olympic team champion.

== Career ==
Martyanova began fencing in 2006 and became a member of the Russian national team in 2015. She participated in the team women's foil event at the 2020 Tokyo Olympic Games as a replacement athlete instead of underperforming Adelina Zagidullina, who struggled in the semifinal match against American Lee Kiefer. In the third period of the gold medal match against France, Martyanova was fencing Pauline Ranvier when she fell and injured her left ankle; however, she continued fencing and eventually helped the team to win gold.

== Medal record ==
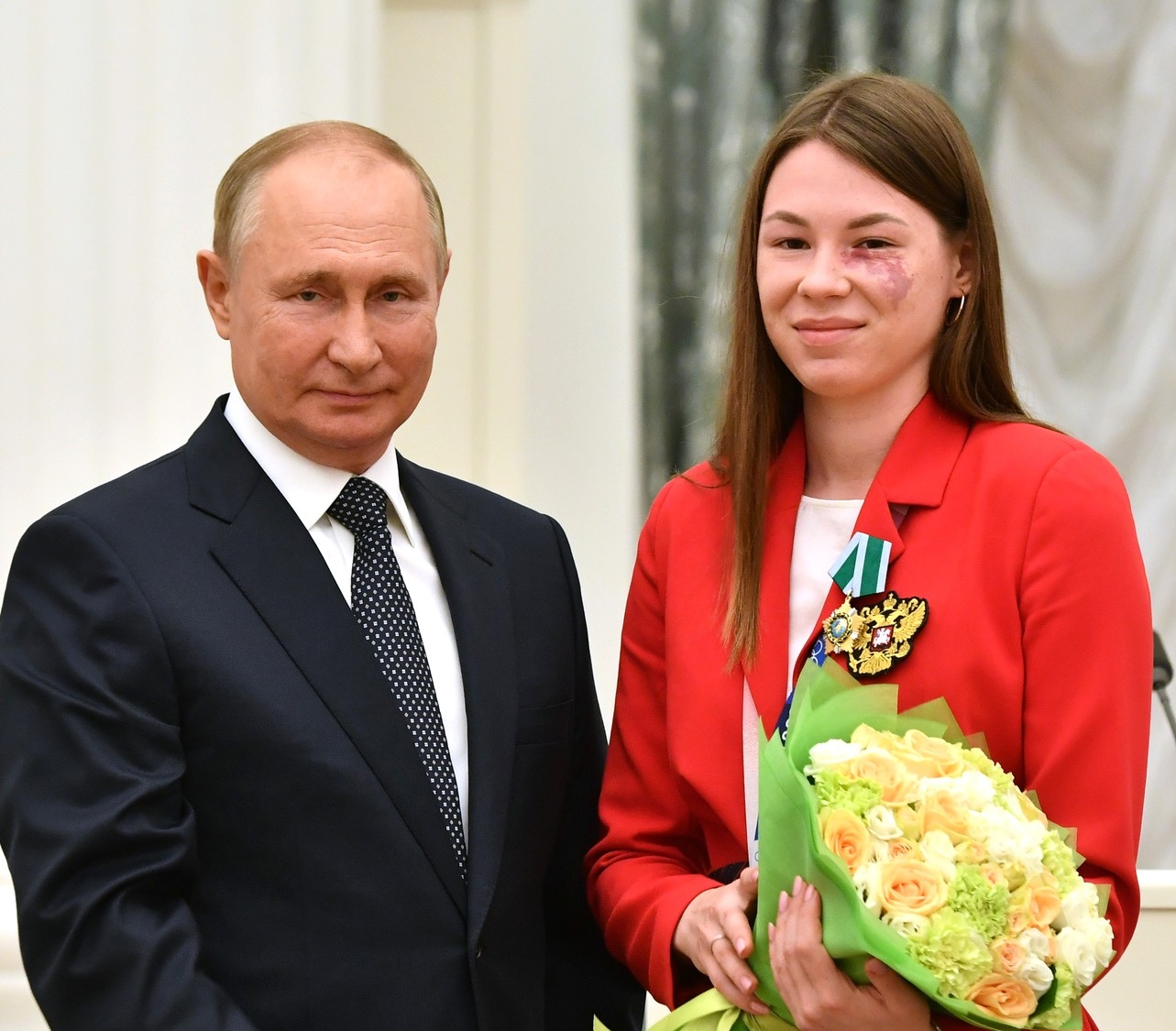
Vladimir Putin and Martynanova in 2021

=== Olympic Games ===
Year	Location	Event	Position
2021	Tokyo, Japan	Team Women's Foil	1st

=== World Championship ===
Year	Location	Event	Position
2017	Leipzig, Germany	Team Women's Foil	3rd

=== European Championship ===
Year	Location	Event	Position
2017	(Georgia (country)) Tbilisi, Georgia	Team Women's Foil	2nd
2018	Novi Sad, Serbia	Team Women's Foil	2nd

=== Grand Prix ===
Date	Location	Event	Position
03/17/2017	(United States) Long Beach, California	Individual Women's Foil	2nd
03/26/2021	Doha, Qatar	Individual Women's Foil	3rd
05/17/2026	Shanghai, China	Individual Women's Foil	3rd
