= Yuliya Bakastova =

Ukrainian sabre fencer (born 1996)

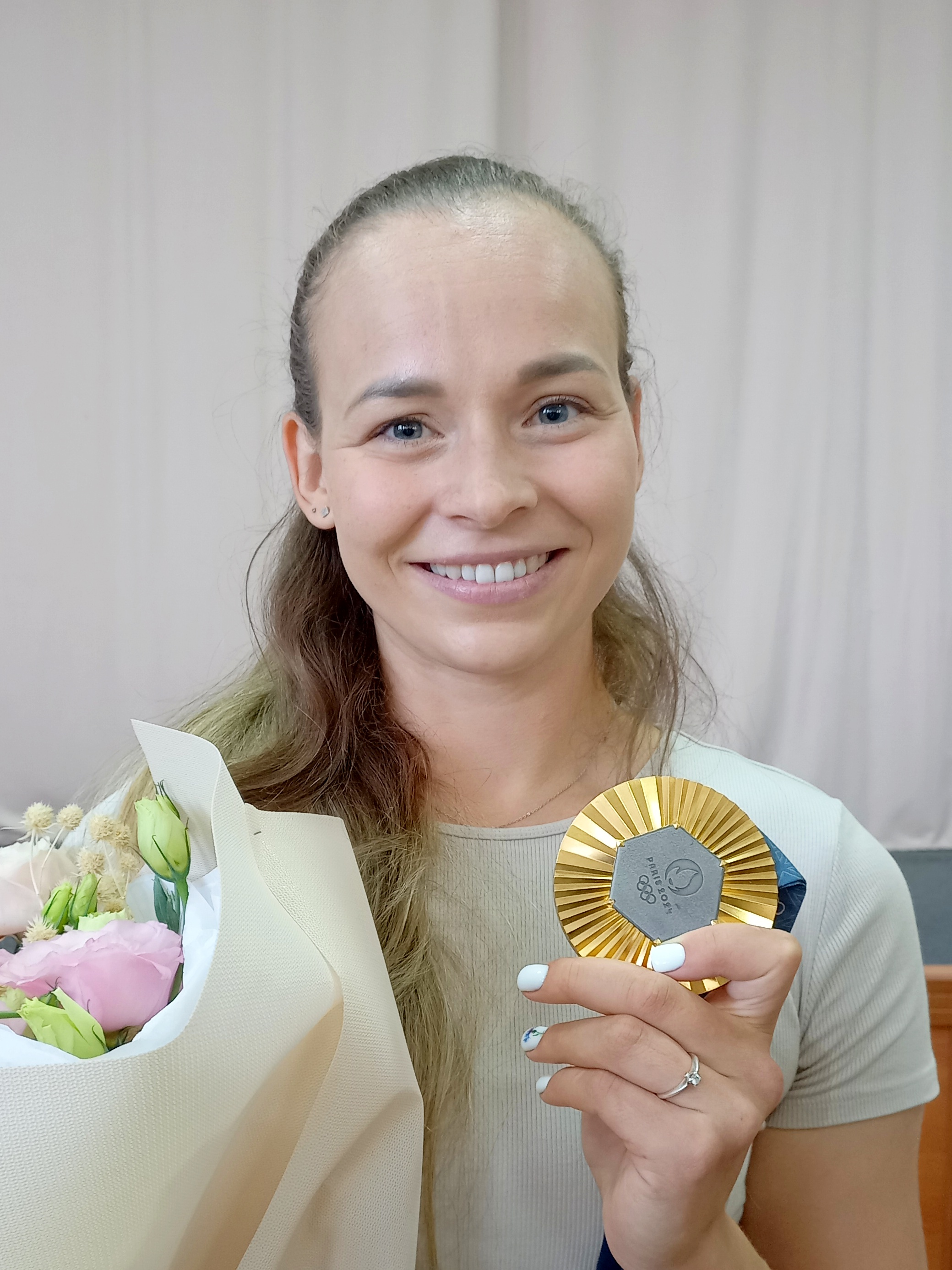
- Bakastova at the 2024 Summer Olympics

Personal information
- Native name: Бакастова Юлія Олександрівна
- Nationality: Ukrainian
- Born: 26 June 1996 (age 30) Kyiv, Ukraine
- Home town: Kyiv, Ukraine

Sport
- Country: Ukraine
- Sport: Fencing
- Event: Sabre
Medal record
Women's sabre
Representing Ukraine
Olympic Games
Gold medal – first place	2024 Paris	Team
European Championships
Silver medal – second place	2018 Novi Sad	Team
Silver medal – second place	2024 Basel	Team
Bronze medal – third place	2022 Antalya	Team
Military Games
Bronze medal – third place	2019 Wuhan	Team

Yuliya Bakastova (Ukrainian: Юлія Олександрівна Бакастова; born 26 June 1996) is a Ukrainian sabre fencer. She is an Olympic champion and won the gold medal in the women's team sabre event at the 2024 Summer Olympics in Paris. Bakastova is also a three-time European Championships team medallist, and won silver medals at the 2018 and 2024 championships, and the bronze medal at the 2022 championships.

== Career ==
She started competing for Ukraine in season 2016/17. Since then she represents Ukraine at various international competitions. At the 2018 European Fencing Championships in Novi Sad, Serbia, she won her first international medal.
