= Takahiro Shikine =

Japanese fencer (born 1997)

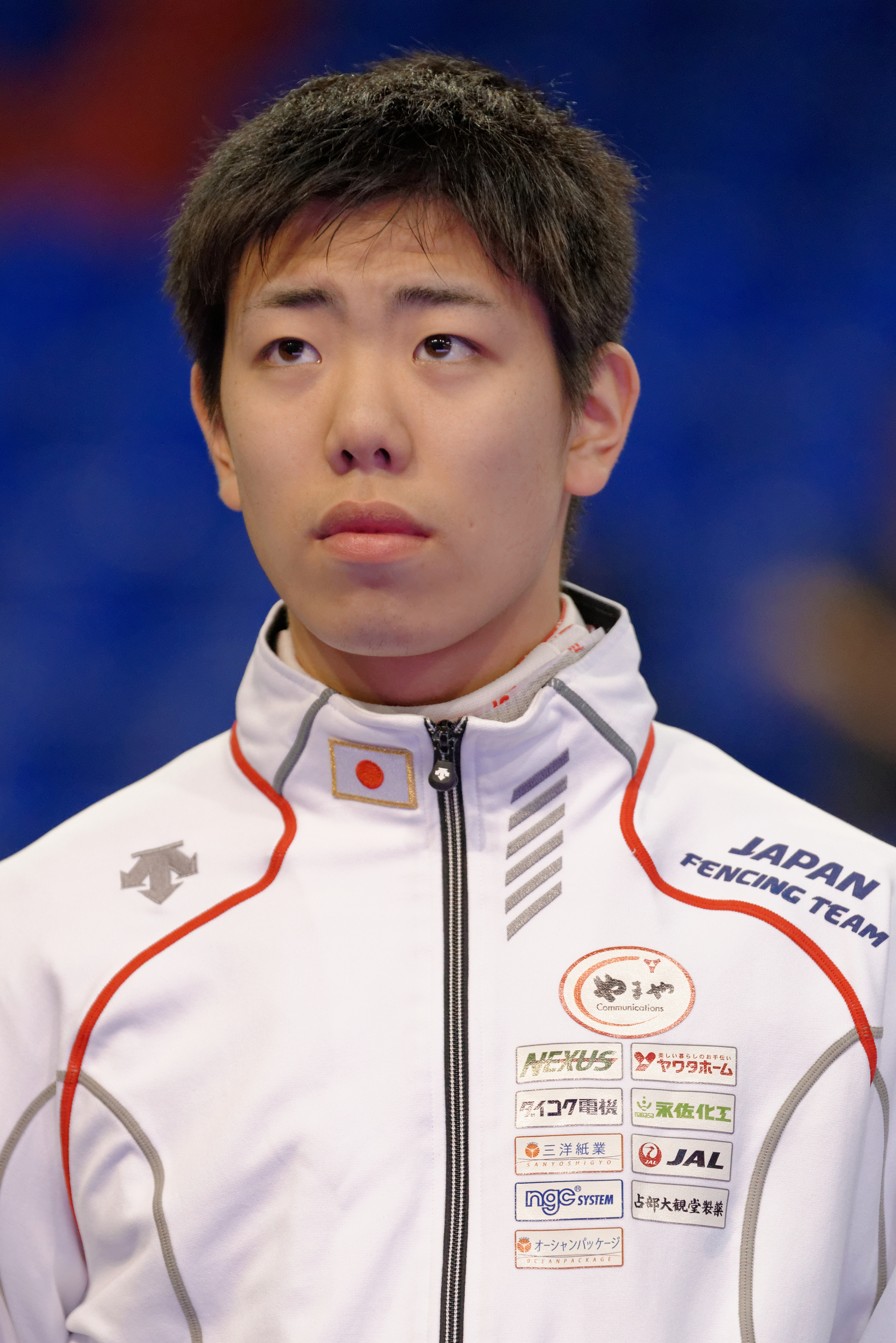
- Shikine in 2015

Personal information
- Born: 7 December 1997 (age 28) Oita, Oita, Japan

Fencing career
- Sport: Fencing
- Country: Japan
- Weapon: Foil
- Hand: Right-handed
- National coach: Erwann Le Pechoux
- FIE ranking: current ranking
Medal record
Men's foil
Representing Japan
Olympic Games
Gold medal – first place	2024 Paris	Team
World Championships
Gold medal – first place	2023 Milan	Team
Bronze medal – third place	2017 Leipzig	Individual
Asian Games
Bronze medal – third place	2018 Jakarta	Team
Bronze medal – third place	2022 Hangzhou	Individual
Bronze medal – third place	2022 Hangzhou	Team
Junior World Championships
Silver medal – second place	2017 Plovdiv	Team
Asian Championships
Gold medal – first place	2023 Wuxi	Team
Gold medal – first place	2022 Seoul	Team
Gold medal – first place	2019 Chiba	Team
Gold medal – first place	2019 Chiba	Individual
Silver medal – second place	2016 Wuxi	Individual
Bronze medal – third place	2024 Kuwait City	Individual
Bronze medal – third place	2024 Kuwait City	Team
Bronze medal – third place	2018 Bangkok	Team
Bronze medal – third place	2016 Wuxi	Team
Summer Universiade
Gold medal – first place	2017 Taipei	Team

Takahiro Shikine (敷根 崇裕, Shikine Takahiro; born 7 December 1997) is a Japanese right-handed foil fencer, 2019 team Asian champion, 2019 individual Asian champion, and 2021 Olympian.

Shikine competed in the 2020 Tokyo Olympic Games.

== Medal record ==
=== World Championship ===
Year	Location	Event	Position
2017	Leipzig, Germany	Individual Men's Foil	3rd

=== Asian Championship ===
Year	Location	Event	Position
2016	Wuxi, China	Individual Men's Foil	2nd
2016	Wuxi, China	Team Men's Foil	3rd
2018	Bangkok, Thailand	Team Men's Foil	3rd
2019	Tokyo, Japan	Individual Men's Foil	1st
2019	Tokyo, Japan	Team Men's Foil	1st

=== Grand Prix ===
Date	Location	Event	Position
2021-03-26	Doha, Qatar	Individual Men's Foil	2nd

=== World Cup ===
Date	Location	Event	Position
2022-02-25	Cairo, Egypt	Individual Men's Foil	3rd
