= Konstantin Lokhanov =

Russian fencer

Personal information
- Native name: Константин Игоревич Лоханов
- Nickname: Kostya
- Nationality: Russian
- Born: November 10, 1998 (age 27) Aktobe, Kazakhstan
- Education: Saratov State Academy of Law
- Height: 199.4 cm (6 ft 7 in)
- Spouse: Sofia Pozdniakova (m. 2020; div. 2022)
- Relative: Stanislav Pozdniakov (former father-in-law)

Sport
- Sport: Fencing
- Event: sabre
- Club: La Jolla Fencing Academy, San Diego, California, United States

Achievements and titles
- Highest world ranking: # 1 in the world in cadet sabre (2014 and 2015); # 1 in the world in junior sabre (2017 and 2018)
Medal record
Men's fencing
Representing Russia
World Junior Fencing Championships
| Gold medal – first place | 2018 Verona | Individual sabre |
| Gold medal – first place | 2017 Plovdiv | Individual sabre |
| Gold medal – first place | 2017 Plovdiv | Team sabre |
| Gold medal – first place | 2016 Bourges | Team sabre |
| Silver medal – second place | 2018 Verona | Team |

Konstantin Lokhanov (Russian: Константин Игоревич Лоханов; born 10 November 1998; nicknamed Kostya) is a Russian sabre fencer living in San Diego, California, in the United States. Lokhanov was ranked # 1 in the world in cadet sabre in both 2014 and 2015. He was then a two-time World Junior Sabre Individual Champion (in 2017 and 2018), and ranked # 1 in the world for both those years. In 2021, he competed in sabre at the 2020 Tokyo Olympics. The following year, appalled by the Russian invasion of Ukraine, he defected to the United States. He said: "I decided I could no longer live in a country that kills innocent Ukrainians." He is a now member of USA Fencing.

== Early years ==
Lokhanov was born in Aktobe, Kazakhstan. He does not consider himself truly Russian, noting "I don’t even drink vodka." He and his parents moved to Saratov, Russia, when he was a child. His mother worked in government procurement in the Saratov Ministry of Health, his father worked as a signalman, and the family was not wealthy. His mother often had to borrow money to send him to competitions.

He studied at the Saratov State Academy of Law in the Russian Federation. His mother, with whom Lokhanov was very close, died of COVID-19 at the end of 2021 during the pandemic, at 43 years of age. His father moved to Kazakhstan after Russia's invasion of Ukraine.

== Fencing career ==
=== Russia; Four-time world junior champion, and Olympian (2014–21) ===
Lokhanov began fencing when he was eight years old, inspired by watching the Soviet Musketeers and Star Wars to ask his mother to take him to learn to fence.

He was ranked #1 in the world in cadet sabre in both 2014 and 2015. He is also a two-time world junior sabre champion (2017, in Plovdiv, Bulgaria; 2018 in Verona, Italy), and was ranked #1 in the world those years in junior sabre.

In 2014 he won a bronze medal at the European Cadet Championships in Jerusalem, Israel, and a bronze medal in the 2014 World Cadets Fencing Championships in Plovdiv, Bulgaria. In 2015 Lokhanov won a gold medal at the European Cadet Championships in Maribor, Slovenia, and a silver medal in the 2015 World Cadets Championships in Tashkent, Uzbekistan.

Lokhanov won a bronze medal at the January 2016 Phoenix Fencing World Cup in Arizona, in the United States. He won silver medals at the October 2016 Plovidv World Cup in Bulgaria, and the November 2016 Sochi World Cup in Russia.

Lokhanov also won a gold medal in team sabre at the 2016 World Junior Fencing Championships. That year he received the title of Master of Sport of International Class in the Russian Federation.

Lokhanov won the 2017 World Junior Fencing Championship in individual sabre, as well as in team sabre. In March 2017 he won a bronze medal in the European Junior Championships. Lokhanov won a gold medal at the October 2017 Sosnowiec World Cup in Poland, and won a bronze medal at the 2017 Plovidv World Cup in Bulgaria. He won a gold medal at the November 2017 Sochi World Cup in Russia. In 2017, he was ranked the #1 junior sabre fencer in the world.

Lokhanov repeated, and won the 2018 World Junior Fencing Championship in individual sabre, giving him a total of four junior world championships. In March 2018, at the European Junior Championships is Sochi, Russia, he won a silver medal in sabre team and a bronze medal in individual sabre. In 2018, he was ranked the #1 junior sabre fencer in the world for the second year in a row.

At the 2019 World Fencing Championships in Budapest, Hungary, Lokhanov was defeated in the quarter-finals by gold medal winner Oh Sang-uk of South Korea.

In 2021, Lokhanov competed in sabre at the Tokyo Olympics. He came in 7th in team sabre, and 24th in individual sabre (losing to 2018 world champion Kim Jung-hwan of South Korea).

Used to winning gold medals, Lokhanov was devastated that he had not performed better at the Olympics, and upon arriving home he "lay in bed for a month, ordering food delivery." Describing what his Olympic experience had been like, he said:

The Olympic Village is an island of broken dreams. Everyone comes there joyful and inspired, although, naturally, they are nervous. And then there are competitions every day. And every day there are more and more sad people. Several thousand people take part in the Olympics, and hundreds of them win medals. And the rest simply remain in the shadows, go home with nothing, as happened to us.

=== United States; US Summer National Champion (2022–present) ===
==== 2022–23; US championship ====
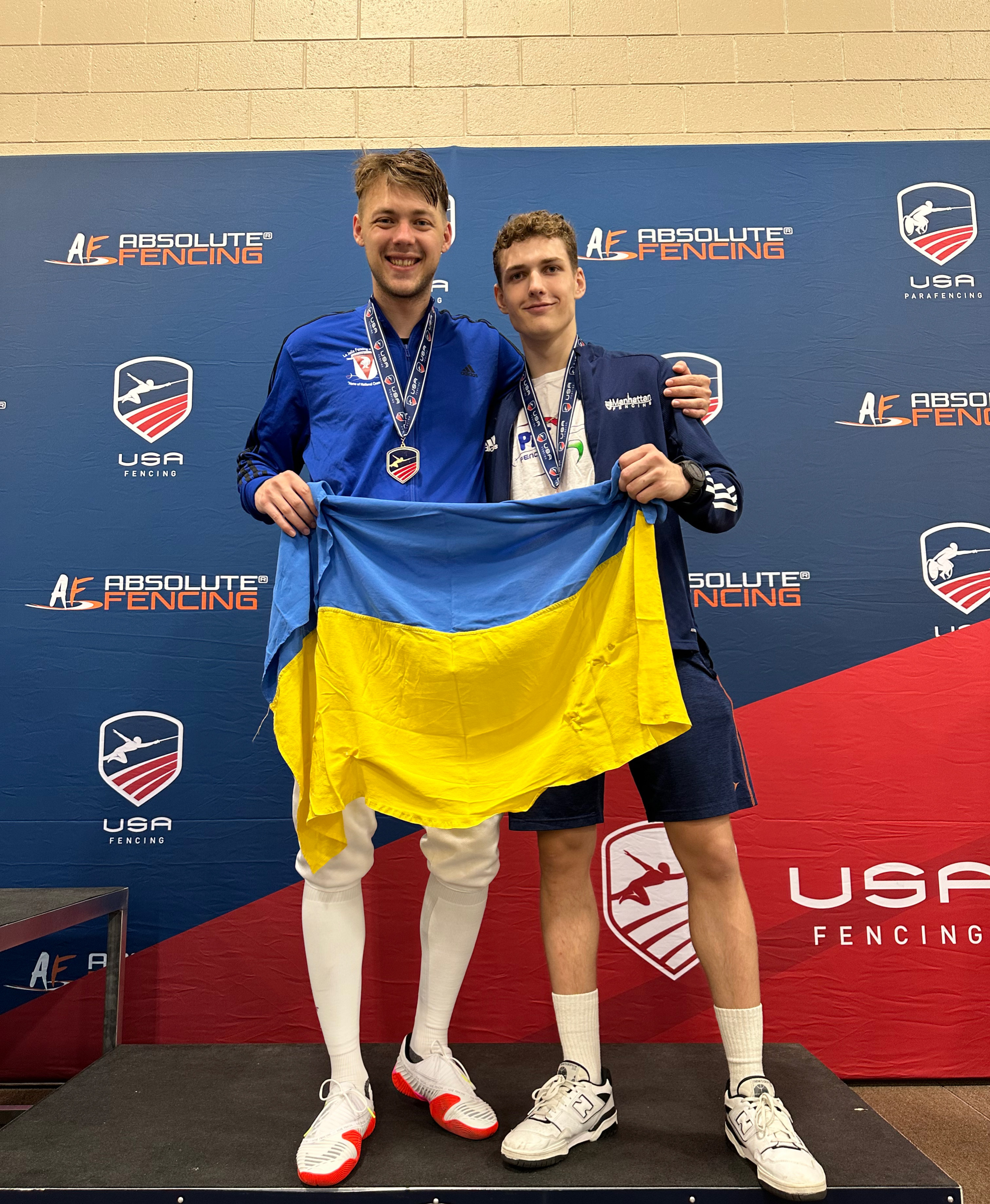
Lokhanov at the 2023 US Summer National Championships, with a Ukrainian fencer

Lokhanov went into surgery in Germany for a hip injury the day before Russia's invasion of Ukraine in February 2022, and woke up to the news of the attack. Shocked and troubled by Russia's invasion, Lokhanov decided, there and then, not to return to Russia; he says his decision took him 10 seconds. Lokhanov has no desire to fence for Russia again. He said: "You need to leave something behind to move forward."

He then rehabbed in Germany, and emigrated to the United States in May 2022. He said: "I decided I could no longer live in a country that kills innocent Ukrainians." He also said "Fencing is a very small part of the life. Being human is way more." Lokhanov had the word “Liberty” tattooed on his right forearm, shortly after he emigrated to the United States. In December 2022 he posted on Instagram: "I’m against this war .... I express my support to all Ukrainians, as well as to the fencers and other athletes from Ukraine. Unfortunately, I couldn’t publicly speak about this earlier."

Lokhanov does not think of himself as having been brave. Rather, he believes he simply made a natural decision, and it is a decision that he does not regret. In order for one to remain in Russia, he said: “You need to forget that killing other people is bad.” When Russia launched its invasion of Ukraine, he said, for him: "everything split into black and white. When I hear that everything is not clear, what is not clear? It's as clear as possible. To kill other people is bad.”

In 2023, USA Fencing granted Russians living in the United States the right to compete in American competitions as neutral athletes, if they sign a public declaration denouncing the Russian invasion of Ukraine. On the Fourth of July weekend, Lokhanov won the gold medal in the individual men's saber competition at the United States Summer National Championships, in which 155 competitors competed. After a Ukrainian fencer won the bronze medal, Lokhanov posed together with him, while the two of them held a Ukrainian flag.

In July 2023, Ukrainian four-time world individual sabre champion Olga Kharlan was initially disqualified at the World Fencing Championships by the Fédération Internationale d'Escrime for not shaking the hand of her defeated Russian opponent—though Kharlan instead offered a tapping of blades in acknowledgement of her opponent. Lokhanov said in a New York Times interview that he thought the Russian fencer might have set a trap for Kharlan, to seek the Ukrainian's disqualification. He said that on the one hand, the FIE had rules about shaking hands. On the other hand, he noted, the tapping of weapon blades—in lieu of a handshake—was the accepted acknowledgment of an opponent during the pandemic, and was still considered suitable by many fencers. Lokhanov said: "I support Olha. In my opinion she made the right decision. I understand why she made it. But I don't see any reason why this Russian woman had to make that drama. She could have just touched blades; the bout was over.” After a public uproar and the intervention of the IOC, the black card was reversed the next day. Author Charlie Pierce wrote: "Both Olga Kharlan and Konstantin Lokhanov were warmly applauded for their stands in defense of Ukraine, and there certainly will be more of this as the 2024 Olympics approach."

Through 2023, he was among the few Russian athletes world-wide who had come out as staunchly against Russia’s invasion; while other Russian athletes have spoken about their general desire for peace, most stopped short of criticizing Russia's war. American writer Charlie Pierce described him as "living his own personal Chekhov short story for over a year."

==== 2024–present; US Olympic Committee support for US citizenship ====
The United States Olympic & Paralympic Committee (USOPC) and USA Fencing both wrote letters in support of Lokhanov and two other defecting Russian Olympic fencers, Sergey Bida and his wife Violetta Bida, being granted U.S. citizenship. USOPC CEO Sarah Hirshland wrote as to the fencers, in a January 4, 2024, letter: "Our intention in endorsing their cause is to enable them to proudly represent our remarkable nation in the upcoming 2024 Olympic Games and other forthcoming international competitions." Phil Andrews, the CEO of USA Fencing, wrote in a January 5, 2024, letter to the U.S. Congress: "All 3 of these individuals have made sacrifices at great personal cost, and put their lives at risk to be able to represent our nation, and we ask you to make every effort to support them in the extraordinary circumstance."

Shortly after the support of the USOPC and USA Fencing for the defecting fencers to obtain U.S. citizenship was made public, Sergey Malinkovich, the Chairman of the Central Committee of the Communists of Russia party, crudely threatened the fencers by sending them a portrait of Leon Trotsky. Trotsky had also emigrated decades earlier, and was assassinated by a Soviet agent in Mexico in 1940. Malinkovich noted: "everyone knows how it ended." Russian State Duma deputy Vitaly Milonov called the fencers "cowards, traitors, and defectors" and "political rags." Russian Olympic Committee President Stanislav Pozdnyakov said: "they were promised to be treated with some sweet cookies. The most important thing is that they don’t choke on them." Soviet-Russian former four-time Olympic champion biathlete Alexander Tikhonov called the Bidas traitors to Russia. Yelena Välbe, the head of the Russian Cross-Country Skiing Federation, said about the three fencers: "It's shameful to run ... We have to be patriots." Other Russian officials also pledged that there would be consequences. Pravda shed light on the Russian officials' reaction, writing: "It is difficult to overestimate the propaganda value of sports, but "defectors" influence public opinion no less."

As of 2024, Lokhanov is a sabre fencing coach teaching and training at La Jolla Fencing Academy in San Diego, California, in the United States, with head coach and founder Dmitriy Guy (a former Soviet sabre champion, Maccabiah Games champion, and US Open champion who emigrated to the United States in the early 1990s). He says there are two main advantages to living in the United States, with one being the warm weather in San Diego. The other, he says, is "freedom." Lokhanov is a member of USA Fencing. His aspiration and goal is to compete and win a medal in the Olympics for Team USA.

Unless extraordinary United States government intervention is undertaken, The New York Times reported, it is unlikely that he will gain American citizenship before the 2024 Paris Olympics. Other possible alternatives are for him to find another country that will grant him citizenship in time for him to compete for the country in the 2024 Olympics, or for him to explore the possibility of competing in the 2024 Olympics for the Refugee Olympic Team. Longer-term would be the possibility of him competing in the 2028 Los Angeles Olympics that will be held up the highway that runs from San Diego, where he now lives, to Los Angeles. He said: "I dream about to go for the Olympics, driving my own car."

== Personal life ==
=== Views on Russian invasion of Ukraine ===
Speaking about Russia's invasion of Ukraine, Lokhanov said:

Before the start of the war, political issues were not so pressing for me. Again, everyone will say that the war began in 2014, which is true. But I was 15 years old then. What policy? I had no time for this. There was a question about where to get chips and Coca-Cola.

As an adult, I always had critical thinking, especially with regard to social issues..... Why didn't I publicly speak out against it? Because if you, for example, support Navalny, then you will not become a high-level athlete. In Russia it works like this. But with the beginning of a full-scale invasion, my worldview seemed to sharpen, everything became black and white. For me this war is unacceptable. You can't kill innocent people.

Lokhanov said that people could stay in Russia, even if they did not support the war. But that: ""you need to stay quiet. You cannot even talk to your friends because you never know. Maybe they're pro-war and they might report you. It's the feeling that you're not free."

=== Marriage, divorce, and grousing father-in-law ===
In September 2020, six years after they met and two years after they began dating, Lokhanov married fellow Olympic sabre fencer Sofia Pozdniakova. She is a 2018 individual sabre world champion, 2019 team sabre world champion, and 2021 both individual sabre and team sabre Olympic champion. She is also a Russian Armed Forces athlete.

Lokhanov had two surgeries in Germany to address a right thigh/hip problem, the first in September 2021, two months after the Tokyo Olympics. His second surgery was on February 23, 2022—as it turned out, the day before Russia invaded Ukraine. His surgery led to him spending the next six weeks on crutches. When he came out of his surgery, he saw for the first time the news of the launch of Russia's invasion. A few minutes after waking up from his surgery, upon hearing the news of the attack he decided never to return to Russia.

Lokhanov emigrated to the United States in 2022, after the outbreak of the Russian invasion of Ukraine, strongly opposed to Russia's war. He said of the Russian government: "They started the war, killing the peoples and thinking it’s normal."

Lokhanov invited his wife to join him in America. She later said: "As for feelings, love, there was a moment when we did not understand where to go. I got up in the morning and thought: “That’s it, I’m going to the States.” I was figuring out how I would communicate with my parents, how to explain all this to my dad... He would simply erase me from his life. Then the next day such thoughts: “So, I’m staying here, my parents, my family - this is important to me." After many hours of telephone conversations in which she struggled with her decision, she declined and ultimately filed for divorce; they divorced in 2022. Her father called his daughter’s decision "the most important gift for Father’s Day." She said she was grateful to Lokhanov for many things, but that the two of them had gone in "different directions."

Lokhanov's father-in-law was Stanislav Pozdniakov, himself a former Olympic sabre fencer, who won four Olympic fencing gold medals and was a 10-time sabre world champion. He has served as the president of the Russian Olympic Committee since 2018. As The New York Times later put it, "Lokhanov ... had married into the first family of Russian fencing and seemed embedded in a life of athletic royalty." His father-in-law had also been European Fencing Confederation (EFC) President, but in June 2022 he was removed from that position at an Extraordinary Congress following a unanimous vote of no confidence in him due to his conduct in the wake of the Russian invasion of Ukraine.

After Lokhanov moved to the United States, his father-in-law—in what The New York Times called an apparent swipe at Western frivolousness—referred to him obliquely as having "the sad fate of frightened lovers of raspberry frappé and yellow scooters." When asked about his ex-father-in-law's comment, Lokhanov said he found it both funny and unsurprising, while at the same time was not quite sure why it had been made. He then added with a smile: "I never had a scooter. I'm a big coffee lover, but not frappé."

== See also ==
- Sergey Bida, Russian Olympic silver medalist fencer who left Russia to go to the United States after the 2022 Russian invasion of Ukraine
- Violetta Khrapina Bida, Russian Olympic fencer who left Russia to go to the United States after the 2022 Russian invasion of Ukraine
