= Bianca Pascu =

Romanian fencer (born 1988)

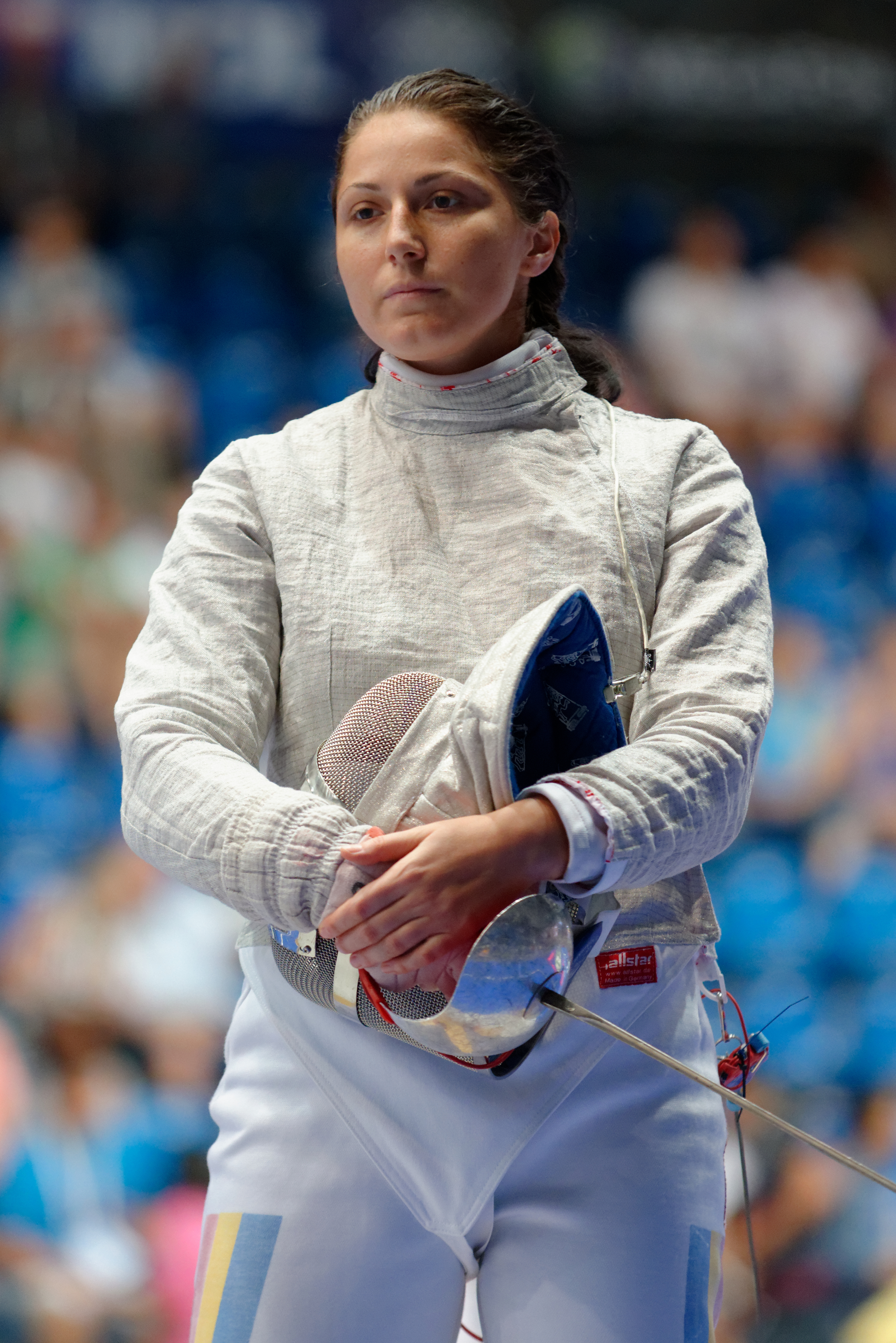
- Pascu at the 2013 World Fencing Championships

Personal information
- Full name: Bianca Alexandru Pascu
- Born: 13 June 1988 (age 38) Brașov, Romania
- Height: 1.75 m (5 ft 9 in)
- Weight: 68 kg (150 lb)

Fencing career
- Sport: Fencing
- Country: Romania
- Weapon: Sabre
- Hand: right-handed
- Club: CS Dinamo București
- Head coach: Alexandru Chiculiță
- FIE ranking: current ranking
Medal record
World Championships
Bronze medal – third place	2019 Budapest	Individual
European Championships
Bronze medal – third place	2017 Tbilisi	Individual

Bianca Alexandru Pascu (born 13 June 1988) is a Romanian sabre fencer. She represented Romania at the 2012 Summer Olympics in London, where she competed in the women's individual sabre event.

== Career ==
Pascu's first sport was handball. She took to fencing at age 10 after a fencing coach from CSM Brașov went to her school and noticed the sport would suit her well. In 2007, she transferred to CS Dinamo Bucharest, where she was trained by Alexandru Chiculiță.

In 2008, Pascu won the silver medal both in the individual and the team events of the Junior European Championships in Ghent. She also earned silver at the 2011 Summer Universiade in Shenzhen, after being defeated in the final by Ukraine's Olha Kharlan. In the World Championships at Catania that same year, she had to forfeit her bout against Germany's Stefanie Kubissa in the table of 64 after she ruptured her knee ligament. After three operations in a row, she qualified for the 2012 Summer Olympics, but lost the first preliminary round bout to China's Zhu Min, with a score of 10–15. In the 2013 World Championships at Budapest, she defeated Julieta Toledo of Mexico in the table of 64, but stumbled against Ukraine's Halyna Pundyk.

She won bronze at the 2017 European Championships.

She now works as a mentor at two Romanian fencing clubs,Dinamo and CSO Voluntari.
