= Sofia Pozdniakova =

Russian sabre fencer

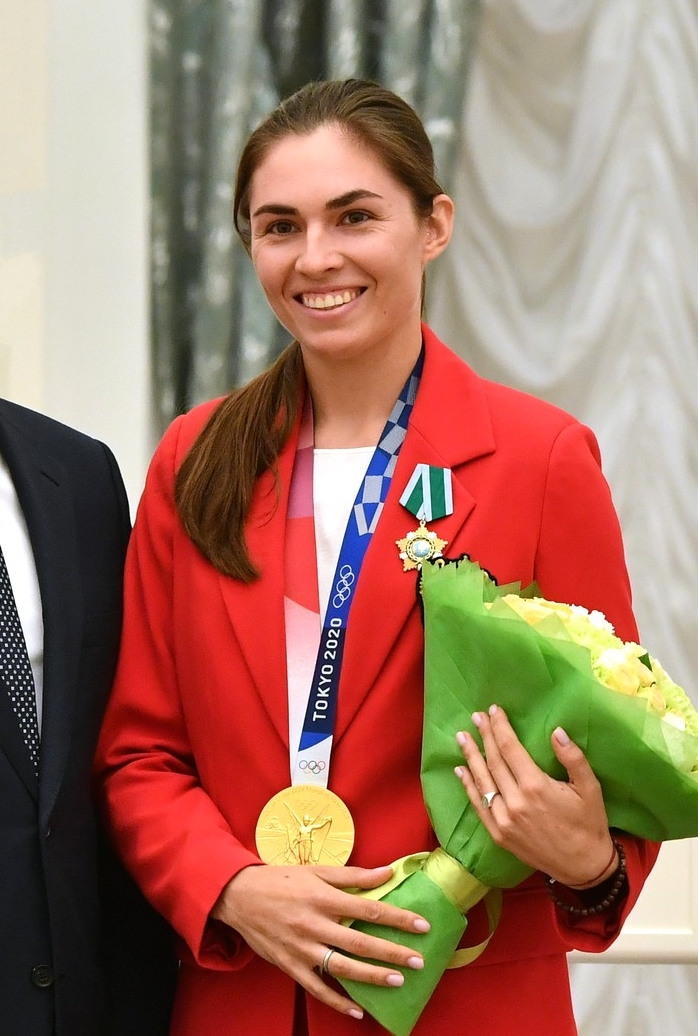
- Pozdniakova in 2021

Personal information
- Full name: Sofia Stanislavovna Pozdniakova
- Nicknames: Sonya, Pozdni
- Nationality: (Russia) Russian
- Born: 17 June 1997 (age 29) Novosibirsk, Russia

Fencing career
- Sport: Fencing
- Country: Russia
- Weapon: Sabre
- Hand: right-handed
- National coach: Christian Bauer
- Club: CSKA Moscow (Central Sports Army Club); Novosibirsk Regional Fencing Sports School of Olympic Reserve
- Head coach: Aleksandr Shirshov, Sergey Stepankin
- FIE ranking: current ranking
Medal record
Representing (Russia) ROC
Olympic Games
Gold medal – first place	2020 Tokyo	Individual sabre
Gold medal – first place	2020 Tokyo	Team sabre
Representing Russia
World Championships
Gold medal – first place	2018 Wuxi	Individual sabre
Gold medal – first place	2019 Budapest	Team sabre
Silver medal – second place	2018 Wuxi	Team sabre
European Championships
Gold medal – first place	2018 Novi Sad	Team sabre
Gold medal – first place	2019 Düsseldorf	Team sabre
Silver medal – second place	2017 Tbilisi	Team sabre

Sofia Stanislavovna Pozdniakova (Russian: София Станиславовна Позднякова, IPA: [sɐˈfʲijə pəzʲnʲɪˈkovə]; formerly Sofia Lokhanova; born 17 June 1997) is a Russian right-handed sabre fencer, 2018 individual world champion, 2019 team world champion, 2021 individual Olympic champion, and 2021 team Olympic champion. She is a Russian Armed Forces athlete, and her clubs are the Russian Central Sports Army Club and the Novosibirsk Regional Fencing Sports School of Olympic Reserve. In January 2024, she was included in the list of proxies of presidential candidate Vladimir Putin in the 2024 Russian presidential election.

== Early life ==
Pozdniakova was born in Novosibirsk, where she was coached by Sergey Stepankin at the Fencing Center. Both of her parents were fencers: her father, Stanislav Pozdnyakov, is a 4-time Olympic champion, 10-time world champion, and 13-time European champion in individual and team sabre, as well as the President of the Russian Olympic Committee since 2018. Her mother, Anastasia, is Master of Sports and secretary at the Fencing Federation of the Novosibirsk Oblast. She decided to follow in her parents' footsteps at the age of 10, and abandoned swimming and acrobatic gymnastics.

== Fencing career ==
Pozdniakova made her international debut in 2017. is the 2018 individual women's sabre world champion, a 2019 team world champion, the 2021 individual Olympic champion, and a 2021 team Olympic champion. She is a Russian Armed Forces athlete, and her clubs are the Russian Central Sports Army Club and the Novosibirsk Regional Fencing Sports School of Olympic Reserve.

== Personal life ==
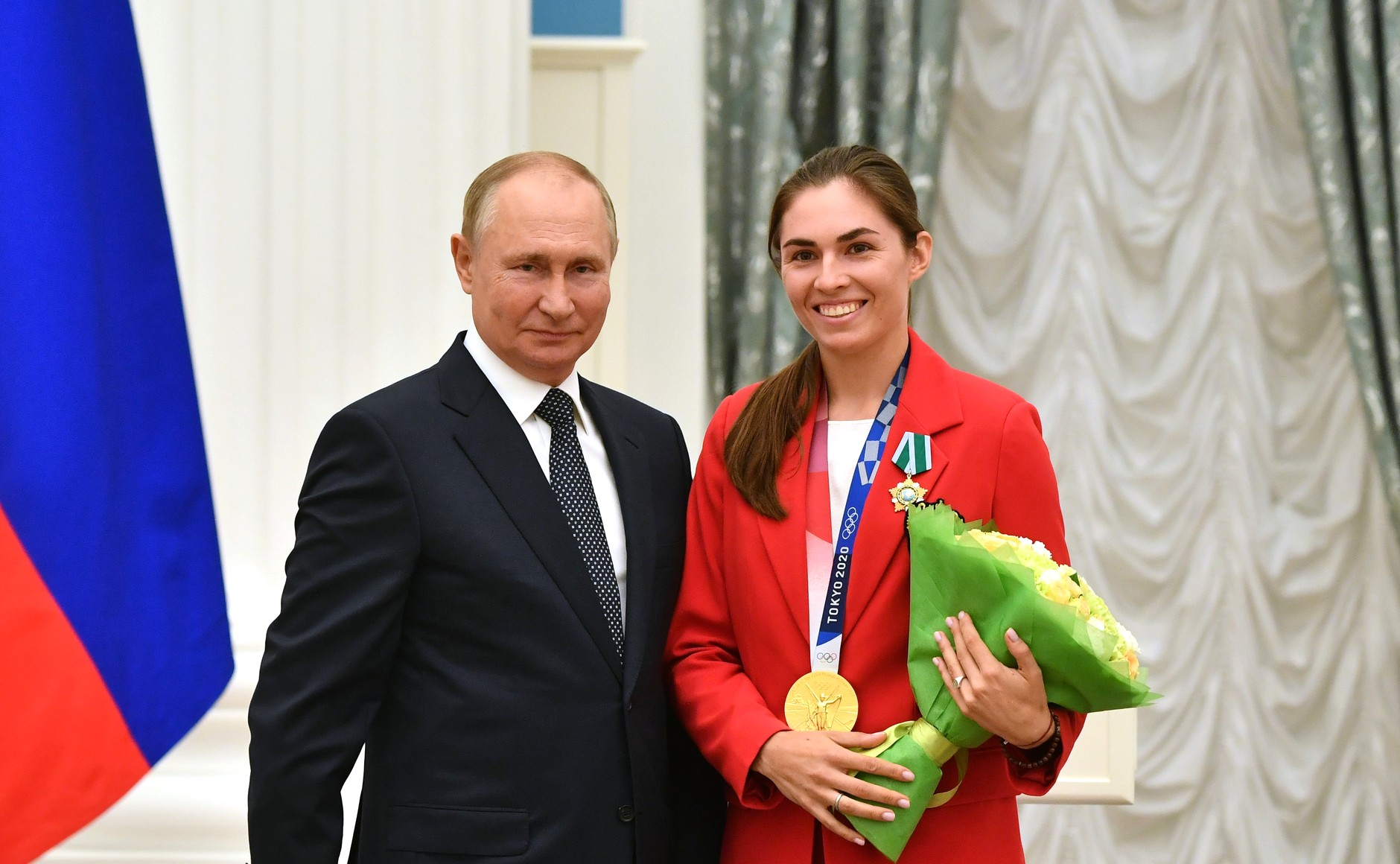
Pozdniakova with Vladimir Putin in 2021

Pozdiakova studied Sport and Tourism at the Smolensk State Academy of Physical Culture, Sports and Tourism, and as of 2018 she planned to become a sports journalist in the future. She moved to Moscow in 2015. Since 2016, she has competed for CSKA Moscow.

In September 2020, Pozdiakova married Saratov-based two-time world individual junior sabre champion and Olympic fencer Konstantin Lokhanov. He emigrated to the United States in 2022 in the wake of the Russian invasion of Ukraine, however, strongly opposed to Russia's war.

Lokhanov invited his wife to join him in America. She later said: "As for feelings, love, there was a moment when we did not understand where to go. I got up in the morning and thought: 'That’s it, I’m going to the States.' I was figuring out how I would communicate with my parents, how to explain all this to my dad... He would simply erase me from his life. Then the next day such thoughts: 'So, I’m staying here, my parents, my family - this is important to me.'" After many hours of telephone conversations in which she struggled with her decision, she declined and ultimately filed for divorce; they divorced in 2022. Her father called his daughter's decision "the most important gift for Father’s Day." She said she was grateful to Lokhanov for many things, but that the two of them had gone in "different directions."

In January 2024, the Russian state-owned new agency TASS reported that she was included in the list of proxies of presidential candidate Vladimir Putin in the 2024 Russian presidential election. By law, self-nominated candidates such as Putin are allowed to have proxies who campaign in their favor. Proxies were expected to be people with high levels of public recognition who publicly supported Putin and Russia's war in Ukraine, and who were willing to spend time campaigning.

== Medal record ==
=== Olympic Games ===
Year	Location	Event	Position
2021	Tokyo, Japan	Individual Women's Sabre	1st
2021	Tokyo, Japan	Team Women's Sabre	1st

=== World Championship ===
Year	Location	Event	Position
2018	Wuxi, China	Individual Women's Sabre	1st
2018	Wuxi, China	Team Women's Sabre	2nd
2019	Budapest, Hungary	Team Women's Sabre	1st

=== European Championship ===
Year	Location	Event	Position
2017	(Georgia (country)) Tbilisi, Georgia	Team Women's Sabre	2nd
2018	Novi Sad, Serbia	Team Women's Sabre	1st
2019	Düsseldorf, Germany	Team Women's Sabre	1st

=== Grand Prix ===
Date	Location	Event	Position
05/24/2019	Moscow, Russia	Individual Women's Sabre	3rd

=== World Cup ===
Date	Location	Event	Position
03/08/2019	Athens, Greece	Individual Women's Sabre	1st
