= Svetlana Sheveleva =

Russian fencer

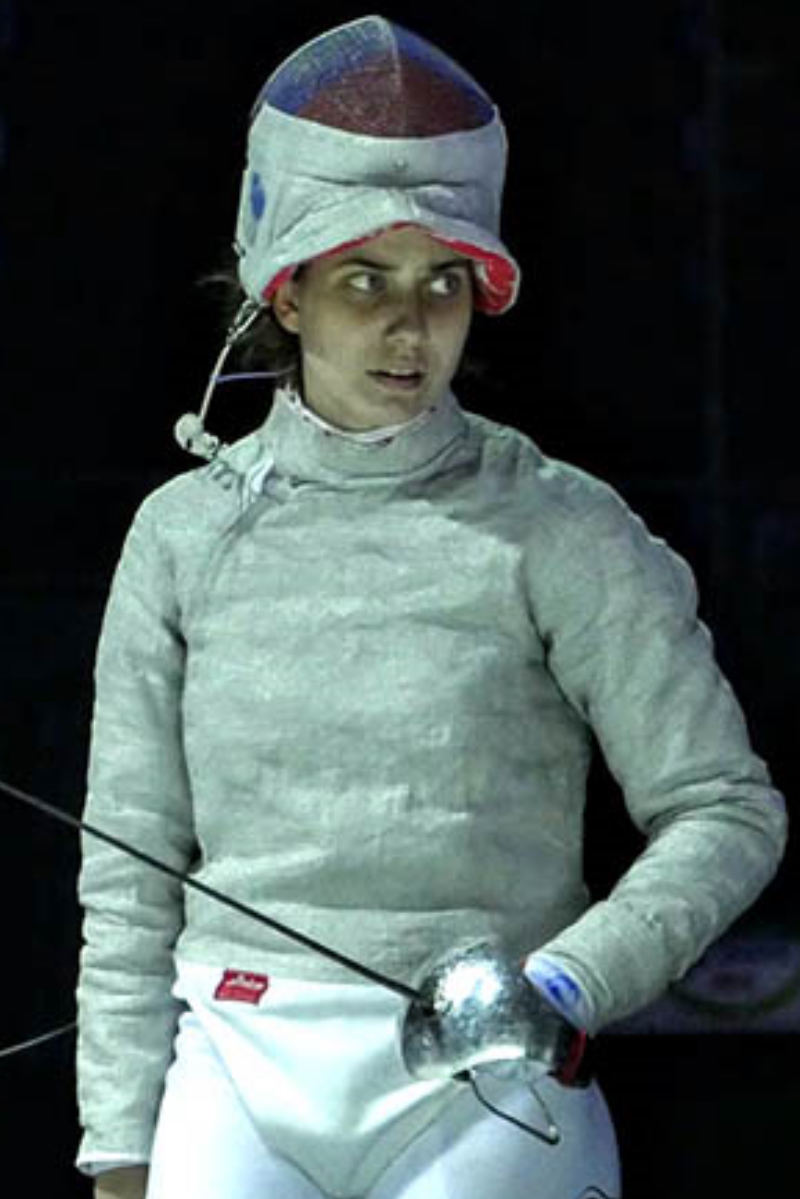
- Born: 26 January 1997 (age 29); Moscow
- Known for: sabre fencing

Svetlana Sheveleva (born 26 January 1997) is a left-handed Russian fencer. She won the Russian women's sabre championship final in 2018.

== Life ==
Sheveleva was born in Moscow in 1997. She tried several sports but they did not appeal. At the suggestion of her mother she took up fencing at the age of ten.

In 2016 she travelled to Bourges in France where she was the best at individual sabre in the World Junior Championships. In 2018 she took a shared bronze medal again in the individual sabre in the 2018 European Championships at Novi Sad in Serbia.

She was coached by Rustam Mansurovich Karimov and national coach Christian Bauer In 2017 she was recognised as a "Master of Sport of International Class" by the Russian Federation.

In 2018 she met Alina Mikhailova in the Russian sabre championship final where Sheveleva won with a score of 15:10. She surprised commentators who had expected Sofya Velikaya, Yulia Gavrilova or Yana Yegoryan to be in the final. After the victory she was ranked 3rd in Russia.
