= André Sanita =

German fencer

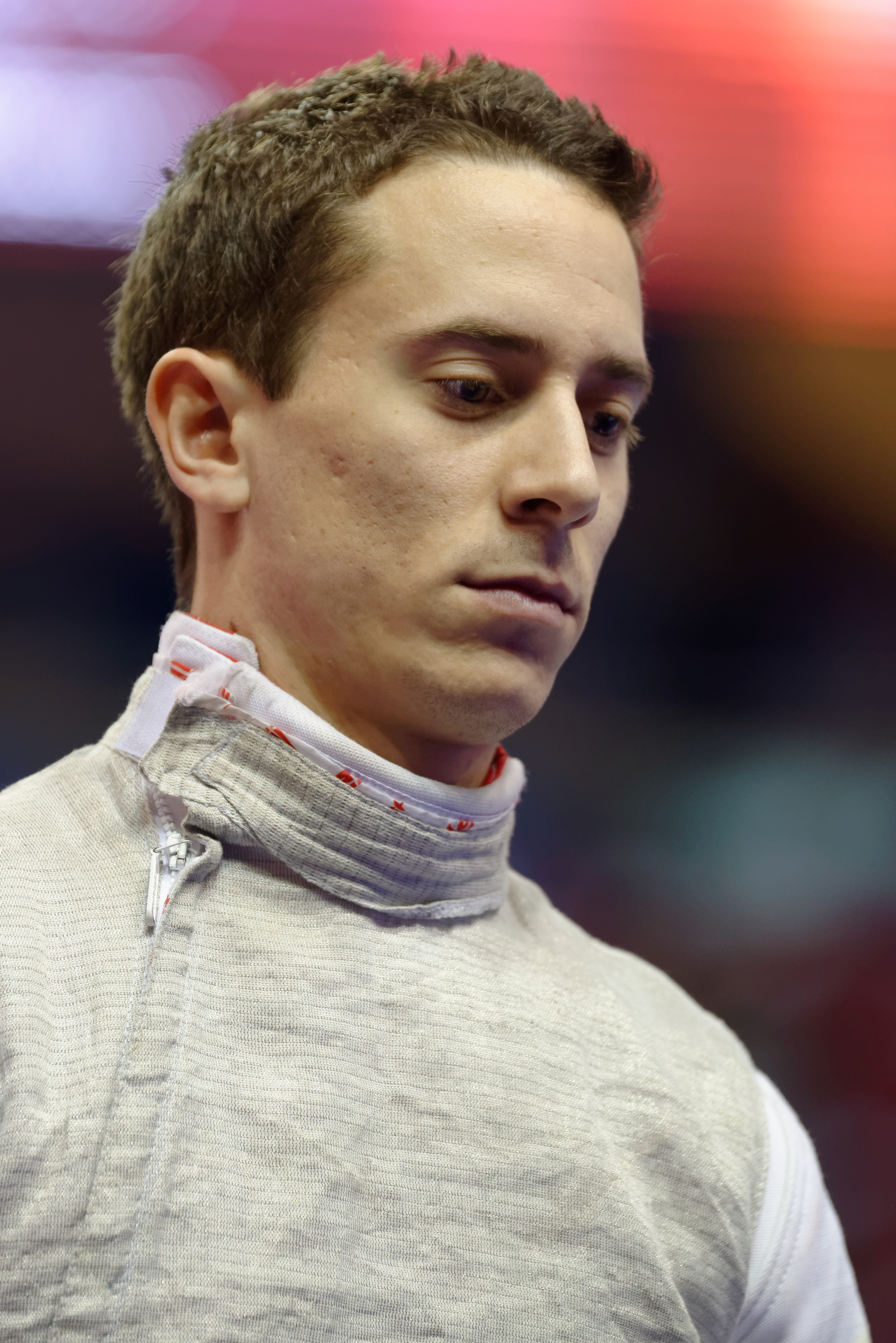

Personal information
- Nationality: German
- Born: 28 March 1992 (age 32); Solingen, Germany

Sport
- Sport: Fencing

André Sanita (born 28 March 1992) is a German fencer. He competed in the men's team foil event at the 2020 Summer Olympics.
