= Women's sabre at the 2010 World Fencing Championships =

- Venue: Grand Palais
- Location: Paris, France
- Dates: 6 November

Medalists
| gold medal | Mariel Zagunis | United States |
| silver medal | Olha Kharlan | Ukraine |
| bronze medal | Olena Khomrova | Ukraine |
| bronze medal | Sofya Velikaya | Russia |

The Women's sabre event took place on November 6, 2010, at Grand Palais.

== Draw ==
=== Finals ===
Semi-finals
(United States) Mariel Zagunis | 15
(Ukraine) Olena Khomrova | 6
(Russia) Sofya Velikaya | 9
(Ukraine) Olha Kharlan | 15

Final
(United States) Mariel Zagunis | 15
(Ukraine) Olha Kharlan | 11

=== Top half ===
==== Section 1 ====
Round of 64
(United States) Mariel Zagunis | 15
(Bulgaria) Margarita Tschomakova | 10
(Poland) Małgorzata Kozaczuk | 7
(Italy) Irene Di Transo | 15
(Japan) Seira Nakayama | 12
(Canada) Olga Ovtchinnikova | 15
(Romania) Mihaela Bulică | 15
(China) Bao Yingying | 11
(Russia) Svetlana Kormilitsyna | 9
(France) Carole Vergne | 15
(South Korea) Kim Keum-hwa | 15
(Canada) Sandra Sassine | 6
(Germany) Alexandra Bujdoso | 15
(South Korea) Lee Woo-ree | 11
(Germany) Katherine Kempe | 8
(Russia) Yuliya Gavrilova | 15

Round of 32
(United States) Mariel Zagunis | 15
(Italy) Irene Di Transo | 6
(Canada) Olga Ovtchinnikova | 15
(Romania) Mihaela Bulică | 13
(France) Carole Vergne | 15
(South Korea) Kim Keum-hwa | 9
(Germany) Alexandra Bujdoso | 8
(Russia) Yuliya Gavrilova | 15

Round of 16
(United States) Mariel Zagunis | 15
(Canada) Olga Ovtchinnikova | 9
(France) Carole Vergne | 15
(Russia) Yuliya Gavrilova | 12

Quarterfinals
(United States) Mariel Zagunis | 15
(France) Carole Vergne | 14

==== Section 2 ====
Round of 64
(Poland) Aleksandra Socha | 15
(Venezuela) Grisel Daly | 4
(United States) Daria Schneider | 12
(Tunisia) Azza Besbes | 15
(United Kingdom) Chrystall Nicoll | 15
(Spain) Laia Vila | 3
(South Korea) Kim Hye-lim | 15
(China) Zhu Min | 14
(United States) Dagmara Wozniak | 15
(Hungary) Anna Várhelyi | 12
(South Korea) Lee Ra-jin | 7
(Ukraine) Olena Khomrova | 15
(Hungary) Réka Benkó | 12
(United States) Ibtihaj Muhammad | 15
(Azerbaijan) Sevil Bunyatova | 11
(Russia) Ekaterina Dyachenko | 15

Round of 32
(Poland) Aleksandra Socha | 8
(Tunisia) Azza Besbes | 15
(United Kingdom) Chrystall Nicoll | 14
(South Korea) Kim Hye-lim | 15
(United States) Dagmara Wozniak | 8
(Ukraine) Olena Khomrova | 15
(United States) Ibtihaj Muhammad | 15
(Russia) Ekaterina Dyachenko | 10

Round of 16
(Tunisia) Azza Besbes | 15
(South Korea) Kim Hye-lim | 10
(Ukraine) Olena Khomrova | 15
(United States) Ibtihaj Muhammad | 14

Quarterfinals
(Tunisia) Azza Besbes | 14
(Ukraine) Olena Khomrova | 15

=== Bottom half ===
==== Section 3 ====
Round of 64
(Russia) Sofya Velikaya | 15
(Brazil) Karina Lakerbai | 6
(Hungary) Réka Pető | 11
(Belarus) Volha Kisialiova | 15
(Ukraine) Olga Zhovnir | 15
(Greece) Marina Piazi | 8
(China) Tan Xue | 13
(Poland) Bogna Jóźwiak | 15
(Germany) Stefanie Kubissa | 15
(Germany) Sibylle Klemm | 13
(United Kingdom) Louise Bond-Williams | 9
(Romania) Elena Munteanu | 15
(Kazakhstan) Yulia Zhivitsa | 10
(Spain) Lucia Martin-Portugues | 15
(Iceland) Thorbjörg Ágústsdóttir | 11
(Italy) Ilaria Bianco | 15

Round of 32
(Russia) Sofya Velikaya | 15
(Belarus) Volha Kisialiova | 7
(Ukraine) Olga Zhovnir | 10
(Poland) Bogna Jóźwiak | 15
(Germany) Stefanie Kubissa | 15
(Romania) Elena Munteanu | 5
(Spain) Lucia Martin-Portugues | 13
(Italy) Ilaria Bianco | 15

Round of 16
(Russia) Sofya Velikaya | 15
(Poland) Bogna Jóźwiak | 10
(Germany) Stefanie Kubissa | 15
(Italy) Ilaria Bianco | 13

Quarterfinals
(Russia) Sofya Velikaya | 15
(Germany) Stefanie Kubissa | 9

==== Section 4 ====
Round of 64
(France) Léonore Perrus | 13
(United Kingdom) Joanna Hutchison | 15
(Romania) Bianca Pascu | 11
(Hungary) Orsolya Nagy | 15
(France) Cécilia Berder | 15
(Thailand) Sirawalai Starrat | 13
(Spain) Araceli Navarro | 9
(Italy) Irene Vecchi | 15
(Italy) Gioia Marzocca | 15
(Poland) Irena Więckowska | 9
(France) Solenne Mary | 10
(Greece) Vassiliki Vougiouka | 15
(China) Ni Hong | 15
(Romania) Andreea Pelei | 11
(Japan) Chizuru Oginezawa | 0
(Ukraine) Olha Kharlan | 15

Round of 32
(United Kingdom) Joanna Hutchison | 14
(Hungary) Orsolya Nagy | 15
(France) Cécilia Berder | 10
(Italy) Irene Vecchi | 15
(Italy) Gioia Marzocca | 15
(Greece) Vassiliki Vougiouka | 10
(China) Ni Hong | 4
(Ukraine) Olha Kharlan | 15

Round of 16
(Hungary) Orsolya Nagy | 10
(Italy) Irene Vecchi | 15
(Italy) Gioia Marzocca | 10
(Ukraine) Olha Kharlan | 15

Quarterfinals
(Italy) Irene Vecchi | 6
(Ukraine) Olha Kharlan | 15
