= Women's team sabre at the 2010 World Fencing Championships =

The Women's team sabre event took place on November 9, 2010 at Grand Palais.

== Sabre team ==
Position	Country	Name
1.	Russia	Dina Galiakbarova; Yuliya Gavrilova; Svetlana Kormilitsyna; Sofiya Velikaya
2.	Ukraine	Olha Kharlan; Olena Khomrova; Halyna Pundyk; Olha Zhovnir
3.	France	Cécilia Berder; Solenne Mary; Léonore Perrus; Carole Vergne
4.	United States	Daria Schneider; Ibtihaj Muhammad; Dagmara Wozniak; Mariel Zagunis
5.	China	Ni Hong; Zhu Min; Bao Yingying; Tan Xue
6.	Poland	Aleksandra Socha; Małgorzata Kozaczuk; Bogna Jóźwiak; Irena Więckowska
7.	Italy	Ilaria Bianco; Gioia Marzocca; Irene Vecchi; Alessandra Lucchino
8.	Hungary	Orsolya Nagy; Réka Pető; Réka Benkó; Anna Várhelyi

Quarter-finals
Russia	45
Hungary	37
China	42
United States	45
France	45
Poland	36
Italy	38
Ukraine	45

Semi-finals
Russia	45
United States	32
France	34
Ukraine	45

Final
Russia	45
Ukraine	33
Third place
United States	35
France	45
