= Fencing at the 2008 Summer Olympics – Women's sabre =

Women's sabre at the Games of the XXIX Olympiad
- Venue: Olympic Green Convention Centre
- Date: 9 August 2008
- Competitors: 39 from 20 nations

Medalists
1st place, gold medalist(s)		Mariel Zagunis	United States
2nd place, silver medalist(s)		Sada Jacobson	United States
3rd place, bronze medalist(s)		Rebecca Ward	United States

The women's sabre fencing competition at the 2008 Summer Olympics in Beijing took place on August 9 at the Olympic Green Convention Centre.

The sabre competition consisted of a five-round single-elimination bracket with a bronze medal match between the two semifinal losers. Fencing was done to 15 touches or to the completion of three three-minute rounds if neither fencer reached 15 touches by then. At the end of time, the higher-scoring fencer was the winner; a tie resulted in an additional one-minute sudden-death time period. This sudden-death period was further modified by the selection of a draw-winner beforehand; if neither fencer scored a touch during the minute, the predetermined draw-winner won the bout.

== Draw ==
=== Finals ===
Semifinals
Sada Jacobson (USA)	15
Sofiya Velikaya (RUS)	11
Mariel Zagunis (USA)	15
Rebecca Ward (USA)	11

Final
Sada Jacobson (USA)	8
Mariel Zagunis (USA)	15
Bronze medal match
Sofiya Velikaya (RUS)	14
Rebecca Ward (USA)	15

=== Section 1 ===
First Round
33	Nafi Toure (SEN)	7
32	Mailyn González (CUB)	15

Second Round
1	Sada Jacobson (USA)	15
32	Mailyn González (CUB)	11
17	Gioia Marzocca (ITA)	8
16	Olga Kharlan (UKR)	15
9	Ekaterina Dyachenko (RUS)	15
24	Madoka Hisagae (JPN)	10
25	Olena Khomrova (UKR)	15
8	Aleksandra Socha (POL)	11

Third Round
1	Sada Jacobson (USA)	15
16	Olga Kharlan (UKR)	13
9	Ekaterina Dyachenko (RUS)	14
25	Olena Khomrova (UKR)	15

Quarterfinals
1	Sada Jacobson (USA)	15
25	Olena Khomrova (UKR)	11

=== Section 2 ===
First Round
37	Adele du Plooy (RSA)	7
28	Halyna Pundyk (UKR)	15
29	Alexandra Bujdoso (GER)	15
36	Julie Cloutier (CAN)	2

Second Round
5	Sofiya Velikaya (RUS)	15
28	Halyna Pundyk (UKR)	7
21	Huang Haiyang (CHN)	12
12	Ilaria Bianco (ITA)	15
13	Kim Keum-Hwa (KOR)	15
20	Carole Vergne (FRA)	14
29	Alexandra Bujdoso (GER)	6
4	Xue Tan (CHN)	15

Third Round
5	Sofiya Velikaya (RUS)	15
12	Ilaria Bianco (ITA)	6
13	Kim Keum-Hwa (KOR)	8
4	Xue Tan (CHN)	15

Quarterfinals
5	Sofiya Velikaya (RUS)	15
4	Xue Tan (CHN)	9

=== Section 3 ===
First Round
35	Siobhan Claire Byrne (IRL)	8
30	Irena Więckowska (POL)	15
27	Sandra Sassine (CAN)	15
38	Elvira Wood (RSA)	2

Second Round
3	Elena Nechaeva (RUS)	12
30	Irena Więckowska (POL)	15
19	Chow Tsz Ki (HKG)	5
14	Bao Yingying (CHN)	15
11	Bogna Jóźwiak (POL)	15
22	Alejandra Benítez (VEN)	11
27	Sandra Sassine (CAN)	10
6	Mariel Zagunis (USA)	15

Third Round
30	Irena Więckowska (POL)	6
14	Bao Yingying (CHN)	15
11	Bogna Jóźwiak (POL)	13
6	Mariel Zagunis (USA)	15

Quarterfinals
14	Bao Yingying (CHN)	9
6	Mariel Zagunis (USA)	15

=== Section 4 ===
First Round
39	Jyoti Chetty (RSA)	2
26	Azza Besbes (TUN)	15
31	Angélica Larios (MEX)	4
34	Araceli Navarro (ESP)	15

Second Round
7	Léonore Perrus (FRA)	11
26	Azza Besbes (TUN)	15
23	Olga Ovtchinnikova (CAN)	15
10	Lee Shin-Mi (KOR)	13
15	Anne-Lise Touya (FRA)	13
18	Orsolya Nagy (HUN)	15
34	Araceli Navarro (ESP)	7(WD)
2	Rebecca Ward (USA)	12

Third Round
26	Azza Besbes (TUN)	15
23	Olga Ovtchinnikova (CAN)	12
18	Orsolya Nagy (HUN)	5
2	Rebecca Ward (USA)	15

Quarterfinals
26	Azza Besbes (TUN)	14
2	Rebecca Ward (USA)	15

== Final classification ==
Rank	Athlete	Nation
1st place, gold medalist(s)	Mariel Zagunis	United States
2nd place, silver medalist(s)	Sada Jacobson	United States
3rd place, bronze medalist(s)	Rebecca Ward	United States
4	Sofiya Velikaya	Russia
5	Xue Tan	China
6	Yingying Bao	China
7	Azza Besbes	Tunisia
8	Olena Khomrova	Ukraine
9	Ekaterina Dyachenko	Russia
10	Bogna Jóźwiak	Poland
11	Ilaria Bianco	Italy
12	Keum-Hwa Kim	South Korea
13	Olga Kharlan	Ukraine
14	Orsolya Nagy	Hungary
15	Olga Ovtchinnikova	Canada
16	Irena Więckowska	Poland
17	Elena Nechaeva	Russia
18	Aleksandra Socha	Poland
19	Léonore Perrus	France
20	Shin-Mi Lee	South Korea
21	Anne-Lise Touya	France
22	Gioia Marzocca	Italy
23	Tsz Ki Chow	Hong Kong
24	Carole Vergne	France
25	Haiyang Huang	China
26	Alejandra Benítez	Venezuela
27	Madoka Hisagae	Japan
28	Sandra Sassine	Canada
29	Halyna Pundyk	Ukraine
30	Alexandra Bujdoso	Germany
31	Mailyn González	Cuba
32	Araceli Navarro	Spain
33	Angélica Larios	Mexico
34	Nafi Toure	Senegal
35	Julie Cloutier	Canada
36	Siobhan Claire Byrne	Ireland
37	Adele du Plooy	South Africa
38	Elvira Wood	South Africa
39	Jyoti Chetty	South Africa
