= Poland at the 2008 Summer Olympics =

- IOC code: POL
- NOC: Polish Olympic Committee
- Website: www.pkol.pl (in Polish)

in Beijing
- Competitors: 268 in 22 sports
- Flag bearers: Marek Twardowski (opening); Tomasz Majewski (closing)
- Medals Ranked 16th: Gold 4 Silver 5 Bronze 2 Total 11

Summer Olympics appearances (overview)
- 1924; 1928; 1932; 1936; 1948; 1952; 1956; 1960; 1964; 1968; 1972; 1976; 1980; 1984; 1988; 1992; 1996; 2000; 2004; 2008; 2012; 2016; 2020; 2024

Other related appearances
- Russian Empire (1900, 1912); Austria (1908–1912)

Poland competed at the Beijing 2008 Summer Olympics. The country's delegation included 268 athletes.

Natalia Partyka, in table tennis, is one of only two athletes competing at both the Beijing Olympics and the Beijing Paralympics – the other being South Africa's Natalie du Toit in swimming.

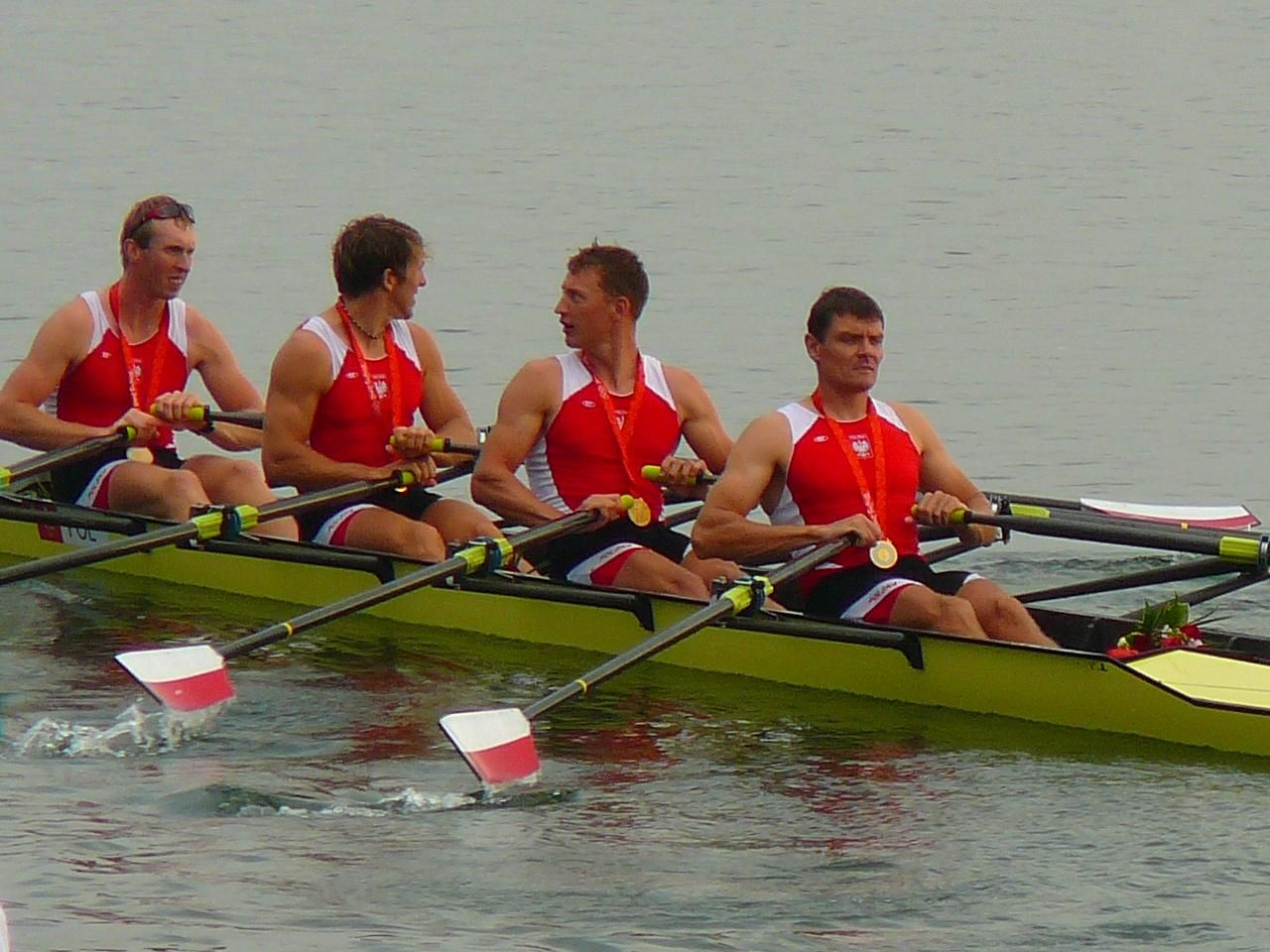
Polish men's quadruple sculls: gold medalists

== Medalists ==
Medal	Name	Sport	Event
Gold	Tomasz Majewski	Athletics	Men's shot put
Gold	Michał Jeliński; Marek Kolbowicz; Adam Korol; Konrad Wasielewski	Rowing	Men's quadruple sculls
Gold	Leszek Blanik	Gymnastics	Men's vault
Gold	Szymon Kołecki	Weightlifting	Men's 94 kg
Silver	Tomasz Motyka; Adam Wiercioch; Radosław Zawrotniak; Robert Andrzejuk	Fencing	Men's team épée
Silver	Łukasz Pawłowski; Bartłomiej Pawełczak; Miłosz Bernatajtys; Paweł Rańda	Rowing	Men's lightweight coxless four
Silver	Piotr Małachowski	Athletics	Men's discus throw
Silver	Maja Włoszczowska	Cycling	Women's cross-country
Silver	Aneta Konieczna; Beata Mikołajczyk	Canoeing	Women's K-2 500 m
Bronze	Agnieszka Wieszczek	Wrestling	Women's freestyle 72 kg
Bronze	Marcin Dołęga	Weightlifting	Men's 105 kg

== Archery ==
Men

Athlete	Event	Ranking round		Round of 64	Round of 32	Round of 16	Quarterfinals	Semifinals	Final / BM	
Athlete	Event	Score	Seed	Opposition Score	Opposition Score	Opposition Score	Opposition Score	Opposition Score	Opposition Score	Rank
Rafał Dobrowolski	Individual	667	13	Myo Aung (MYA) (52); W 110–106	Serdyuk (UKR) (20); W 111 (9)–111 (8)	Park K-M (KOR) (4); L 105–113	Did not advance			
Piotr Piątek	Individual	649	43	Moriya (JPN) (22); L 109 (9)–109 (10)	Did not advance					
Jacek Proć	Individual	661	19	Li Wq (CHN) (46); W 116–111 OR	Kim (AUS) (14); W 111–110	Ruban (UKR) (3); L 108–114	Did not advance			
Rafał Dobrowolski; Piotr Piątek; Jacek Proć	Team	1977	8	—N/a		Australia (9); W 223–218	South Korea (1); L 222–224	Did not advance		

Women

Athlete	Event	Ranking round		Round of 64	Round of 32	Round of 16	Quarterfinals	Semifinals	Final / BM	
Athlete	Event	Score	Seed	Opposition Score	Opposition Score	Opposition Score	Opposition Score	Opposition Score	Opposition Score	Rank
Małgorzata Ćwienczek	Individual	645	13	Laursen (DEN) (52); W 113–100	Avitia (MEX) (20); L 100–109	Did not advance				
Iwona Marcinkiewicz	Individual	620	43	Devi (IND) (22); W 103–101	Erdyniyeva (RUS) (11); L 103–104	Did not advance				
Justyna Mospinek	Individual	643	19	Kitabatake (JPN) (46); L 101–103	Did not advance					
Małgorzata Ćwienczek; Iwona Marcinkiewicz; Justyna Mospinek	Team	1908	4	—N/a		Bye	France (5); L 211–218	Did not advance		

== Athletics ==
Key

- Note–Ranks given for track events are within the athlete's heat only
- Q = Qualified for the next round
- q = Qualified for the next round as a fastest loser or, in field events, by position without achieving the qualifying target
- NR = National record
- N/A = Round not applicable for the event
- Bye = Athlete not required to compete in round

Men
Track & road events

Athlete	Event	Heat		Quarterfinal		Semifinal		Final	
Athlete	Event	Result	Rank	Result	Rank	Result	Rank	Result	Rank
Rafał Augustyn	20 km walk	—N/a						1:24:25	29
Artur Brzozowski	50 km walk	—N/a						DSQ	
Paweł Czapiewski	800 m	1:47.66	3	—N/a		Did not advance			
Daniel Dąbrowski	400 m	47.83	8	—N/a		Did not advance			
Rafał Fedaczyński	50 km walk	—N/a						3:46:51 PB	8
Marcin Jędrusiński	200 m	20.64	2 Q	20.58 SB	4	Did not advance			
Jakub Jelonek	20 km walk	—N/a						1:30:37	46
Dariusz Kuć	100 m	10.44	5 q	10.46	7	Did not advance			
Marcin Lewandowski	800 m	1:45.89 SB	4 q	—N/a		1:47.24	7	Did not advance	
Artur Noga	110 m hurdles	13.53	1 Q	13.36	2 Q	13.34 PB	2 Q	13.36	5
Marek Plawgo	400 m hurdles	49.17	3 Q	—N/a		48.75	4 Q	48.52	6
Arkadiusz Sowa	Marathon	—N/a						2:24:48	54
Grzegorz Sudoł	50 km walk	—N/a						3:47:18	9
Tomasz Szymkowiak	3000 m steeplechase	8:29.37	7	—N/a				Did not advance	
Henryk Szost	Marathon	—N/a						2:19:43	34
Łukasz Chyła; Marcin Jędrusiński; Robert Kubaczyk; Dariusz Kuć; Kamil Masztak; Marcin Nowak	4 × 100 m relay	DNF		—N/a				Did not advance	
Daniel Dąbrowski; Piotr Kędzia; Piotr Klimczak; Marek Plawgo; Piotr Wiaderek; Rafał Wieruszewski	4 × 400 m relay	3:00.74 SB	5 q	—N/a				3:00.32 SB	7

Field events

Athlete	Event	Qualification		Final	
Athlete	Event	Distance	Position	Distance	Position
Michał Bieniek	High jump	2.20	=24	Did not advance	
Przemysław Czerwiński	Pole vault	5.65	=7 q	5.45	10
Igor Janik	Javelin throw	77.63	16	Did not advance	
Tomasz Majewski	Shot put	21.04 PB	1 Q	21.51 PB	1st place, gold medalist(s)
Piotr Małachowski	Discus throw	65.94	1 Q	67.82	2nd place, silver medalist(s)
Marcin Starzak	Long jump	7.62	33	Did not advance	
Szymon Ziółkowski	Hammer throw	79.55 SB	2 Q	79.22	7

Women
Track & road events

Athlete	Event	Heat		Quarterfinal		Semifinal		Final	
Athlete	Event	Result	Rank	Result	Rank	Result	Rank	Result	Rank
Monika Bejnar	400 m	52.80	6	—N/a		Did not advance			
Lidia Chojecka	1500 m	4:19.57	10	—N/a				Did not advance	
Monika Drybulska	Marathon	—N/a						2:32:39 SB	24
Sylwia Ejdys	1500 m	4:08.37	6	—N/a				Did not advance	
Wioletta Frankiewicz	3000 m steeplechase	9:21.88 SB	3 Q	—N/a				9:21.76 SB	7
Dorota Gruca	Marathon	—N/a						2:33:32	30
Anna Jakubczak	1500 m	4:07.33	7	—N/a				Did not advance	
Marta Jeschke	200 m	23.59	7	Did not advance					
Anna Jesień	400 m hurdles	55.35	2 Q	—N/a		54.36	3 Q	54.29 SB	5
Daria Korczyńska	100 m	11.22	3 Q	11.41	5	Did not advance			
Sylwia Korzeniowska	20 km walk	—N/a						1:31:19	21
Katarzyna Kowalska	3000 m steeplechase	9:47.02	11	—N/a				Did not advance	
Anna Rostkowska	800 m	2:02.11	3 Q	—N/a		1:58.84	5	Did not advance	
Aurelia Trywiańska-Kollasch	100 m hurdles	12.98	4 q	—N/a		12.96	6	Did not advance	
Dorota Jędrusińska; Marta Jeschke; Ewelina Klocek; Joanna Kocielnik; Daria Korczyńska	4 × 100 m relay	43.47	5 q	—N/a				DSQ	
Monika Bejnar; Anna Jesień; Agnieszka Karpiesiuk; Grażyna Prokopek-Janáček; Jolanta Wójcik	4 × 400 m relay	3:28.23	6	—N/a				Did not advance	

Field events

Athlete	Event	Qualification		Final	
Athlete	Event	Distance	Position	Distance	Position
Żaneta Glanc	Discus throw	NM	—	Did not advance	
Urszula Jasińska	Javelin throw	59.28	13	Did not advance	
Barbara Madejczyk	Javelin throw	62.81 SB	5 Q	62.02	6
Joanna Piwowarska	Pole vault	4.30	19	Did not advance	
Wioletta Potępa	Discus throw	59.44	16	Did not advance	
Monika Pyrek	Pole vault	4.50	8 q	4.70	5
Anna Rogowska	Pole vault	4.50	8 q	4.45	10
Kamila Skolimowska	Hammer throw	69.79	9 q	NM	—
Joanna Wiśniewska	Discus throw	59.40	17	Did not advance	
Anita Włodarczyk	Hammer throw	71.76	5 Q	71.56	4
Krystyna Zabawska	Shot put	NM	—	Did not advance	
Małgorzata Zadura	Hammer throw	64.13	36	Did not advance	

Combined events – Heptathlon

Athlete	Event	100H	HJ	SP	200 m	LJ	JT	800 m	Final	Rank
Kamila Chudzik	Result	13.79	1.77	14.34	25.36	5.97	52.05	2:21.97	6157	15*
Kamila Chudzik	Points	1008	941	817	854	840	900	797	6157	15*
Karolina Tymińska	Result	13.62	1.77	14.08	23.39	6.53	35.97	2:07.08	6428 PB	7*
Karolina Tymińska	Points	1033	941	799	1040	1017	590	1008	6428 PB	7*

* The athlete who finished in second place, Lyudmila Blonska of Ukraine, tested positive for a banned substance. Both the A and the B tests were positive, therefore Blonska was stripped of her silver medal, and both Polish heptathletes moved up a position.

== Badminton ==
Athlete	Event	Round of 64	Round of 32	Round of 16	Quarterfinal	Semifinal	Final / BM	
Athlete	Event	Opposition Score	Opposition Score	Opposition Score	Opposition Score	Opposition Score	Opposition Score	Rank
Przemysław Wacha	Men's singles	Must (EST); W 21–14, 21–15	Bösiger (SUI); W 21–12, 11–21, 21–19	Bao Cl (CHN); L 11–21, 21–19, 13–21	Did not advance			
Michał Łogosz; Robert Mateusiak	Men's doubles	—N/a		Smith / Warfe (AUS); W 21–13, 21–16	Paaske / Rasmussen (DEN); L 21–17, 11–21, 15–21	Did not advance		
Kamila Augustyn	Women's singles	Jun J-y (KOR); L 15–21, 5–21	Did not advance					
Robert Mateusiak; Nadieżda Kostiuczyk	Mixed doubles	—N/a		Cupidon / Ah-Wan (SEY); W 21–8, 21–19	He Hb / Yu Y (CHN); L 20–22, 21–23	Did not advance		

== Boxing ==
Athlete	Event	Round of 32	Round of 16	Quarterfinals	Semifinals	Final	
Athlete	Event	Opposition Result	Opposition Result	Opposition Result	Opposition Result	Opposition Result	Rank
Łukasz Maszczyk	Light flyweight	Kargbo (SLE); W RSC	Uutoni (NAM); W 5^{+}–5	Barnes (IRL); L 5–11	Did not advance		
Rafał Kaczor	Flyweight	Sarsembayev (KAZ); L 5–14	Did not advance				

== Canoeing ==
=== Slalom ===
Athlete	Event	Preliminary						Semifinal		Final			
Athlete	Event	Run 1	Rank	Run 2	Rank	Total	Rank	Time	Rank	Time	Rank	Total	Rank
Krzysztof Bieryt	Men's C-1	95.39	14	87.90	10	183.29	12 Q	90.08	3 Q	110.13	8	200.21	8
Dariusz Popiela	Men's K-1	85.51	7	85.51	6	171.02	5 Q	88.49	7 Q	88.49	7	179.68	8
Marcin Pochwała; Paweł Sarna	Men's C-2	98.38	6	100.37	8	198.75	7 Q	105.32	8	Did not advance			
Agnieszka Stanuch	Women's K-1	101.16	8	101.76	10	202.92	8 Q	116.46	9 Q	104.62	4	221.08	5

=== Sprint ===
Men

Athlete	Event	Heats		Semifinals		Final	
Athlete	Event	Time	Rank	Time	Rank	Time	Rank
Paweł Baraszkiewicz	C-1 500 m	1:50.463	3 QS	1:51.744	3 Q	1:50.048	8
Marcin Grzybowski	C-1 1000 m	4:02.010	3 QS	4:00.226	4	Did not advance	
Marek Twardowski	K-1 500 m	1:39.436	4 QS	1:43.733	5	Did not advance	
Paweł Baraszkiewicz; Wojciech Tyszyński	C-2 1000 m	3:42.177	5 QS	3:42.435	1 QF	3:42.845	7
Daniel Jędraszko; Roman Rynkiewicz	C-2 500 m	1:42.309	3 QF	Bye		1:44.389	9
Mariusz Kujawski; Adam Seroczyński	K-2 1000 m	3:18.282	2 QF	Bye		~~3:14.828~~	DSQ
Marek Twardowski; Adam Wysocki	K-2 500 m	1:32.107	6 QS	1:31.481	2 Q	1:31.869	8
Paweł Baumann; Tomasz Mendelski; Marek Twardowski; Adam Wysocki	K-4 1000 m	2:59.290	3 QF	Bye		2:59.505	6

Women

Athlete	Event	Heats		Semifinals		Final	
Athlete	Event	Time	Rank	Time	Rank	Time	Rank
Małgorzata Chojnacka	K-1 500 m	1:53.635	6 QS	1:55.619	8	Did not advance	
Aneta Konieczna; Beata Mikołajczyk	K-2 500 m	1:44.631	2 QF	Bye		1:42.092	2nd place, silver medalist(s)
Edyta Dzieniszewska; Aneta Konieczna; Dorota Kuczkowska; Beata Mikołajczyk	K-4 500 m	1:36.497	2 QF	Bye		1:34.752	4

Qualification Legend: QS = Qualify to semi-final; QF = Qualify directly to final

== Cycling ==
=== Road ===
Athlete	Event	Time	Rank
Tomasz Marczyński	Men's road race	6:49:59	84
Jacek Morajko	Men's road race	6:34:26	55
Przemysław Niemiec	Men's road race	6:24:11	16
Przemysław Niemiec	Men's time trial	1:08:43	34
Paulina Brzeźna	Women's road race	3:18:46	8

=== Track ===
Sprint

Athlete	Event	Qualification		Round 1	Repechage 1	Round 2	Quarterfinals	Semifinals	Final	
Athlete	Event	Time Speed (km/h)	Rank	Opposition Time Speed (km/h)	Opposition Time Speed (km/h)	Opposition Time Speed (km/h)	Opposition Time Speed (km/h)	Opposition Time Speed (km/h)	Opposition Time Speed (km/h)	Rank
Łukasz Kwiatkowski	Men's sprint	10.504; 68.545	17 Q	Kenny (GBR); L	Awang (MAS); Kitatsuru (JPN); L	Did not advance				
Maciej Bielecki; Kamil Kuczyński; Łukasz Kwiatkowski	Men's team sprint	45.266; 59.647	13	Did not advance						

Keirin

Athlete	Event	1st round	Repechage	2nd round	Finals
Athlete	Event	Rank	Rank	Rank	Rank
Kamil Kuczyński	Men's keirin	5 R	1 Q	6	11

Points race

Athlete	Event	Points	Laps	Rank
Rafał Ratajczyk	Men's points race	10	0	11

=== Mountain biking ===
Athlete	Event	Time	Rank
Marek Galiński	Men's cross-country	2:01:29	13
Aleksandra Dawidowicz	Women's cross-country	1:51:21	10
Maja Włoszczowska	Women's cross-country	1:45:52	2nd place, silver medalist(s)

== Equestrian ==
=== Dressage ===
Athlete	Horse	Event	Grand Prix		Grand Prix Special		Grand Prix Freestyle		Overall	
Athlete	Horse	Event	Score	Rank	Score	Rank	Score	Rank	Score	Rank
Michał Rapcewicz	Randon	Individual	67.500	16 Q	65.120	23	Did not advance			

=== Eventing ===
Athlete	Horse	Event	Dressage		Cross-country			Jumping						Total	
Athlete	Horse	Event	Dressage		Cross-country			Qualifier			Final			Total	
Athlete	Horse	Event	Penalties	Rank	Penalties	Total	Rank	Penalties	Total	Rank	Penalties	Total	Rank	Penalties	Rank
Paweł Spisak	Weriusz	Individual	48.70	27	34.00	82.70	38	0.00	82.70	24	0.00	82.70	19	82.70	19
Artur Społowicz	Wag	Individual	57.00	54	74.40	131.40	52	23.00	154.40	52	Did not advance			154.40	52

== Fencing ==
Men

Athlete	Event	Round of 64	Round of 32	Round of 16	Quarterfinal	Semifinal	Final / BM	
Athlete	Event	Opposition Score	Opposition Score	Opposition Score	Opposition Score	Opposition Score	Opposition Score	Rank
Tomasz Motyka	Individual épée	Rami (MAR); W 15–11	Confalonieri (ITA); L 10–15	Did not advance				
Adam Wiercioch	Individual épée	Li Gj (CHN); L 11–15	Did not advance					
Radosław Zawrotniak	Individual épée	Bye	Videira (POR); W 15–9	Yin Lc (CHN); L 13–15	Did not advance			
Robert Andrzejuk; Tomasz Motyka; Adam Wiercioch; Radosław Zawrotniak	Team épée	—N/a		Bye	Ukraine; W 45–37	China; W 45–44	France; L 29–45	2nd place, silver medalist(s)
Sławomir Mocek	Individual foil	—N/a	Panchan (THA); W 15–7	Lei S (CHN); L 8–15	Did not advance			
Marcin Koniusz	Individual sabre	Bravo (VEN); W 15–10	Limbach (GER); L 7–15	Did not advance				

Women

Athlete	Event	Round of 64	Round of 32	Round of 16	Quarterfinal	Semifinal	Final / BM	
Athlete	Event	Opposition Score	Opposition Score	Opposition Score	Opposition Score	Opposition Score	Opposition Score	Rank
Sylwia Gruchała	Individual foil	Bye	Chanaeva (RUS); L 11–12	Did not advance				
Magdalena Mroczkiewicz	Individual foil	Leleyko (UKR); W 15–9	Vezzali (ITA); L 3–15	Did not advance				
Małgorzata Wojtkowiak	Individual foil	Bye	Zhang L (CHN); L 8–15	Did not advance				
Sylwia Gruchała; Magdalena Mroczkiewicz; Małgorzata Wojtkowiak	Team foil	—N/a			United States; L 30–31	Classification semi-final Germany; L 27–32	7th place final Egypt; W 45–14	7
Bogna Jóźwiak	Individual sabre	Bye	Benítez (VEN); W 15–11	Zagunis (USA); L 13–15	Did not advance			
Aleksandra Socha	Individual sabre	Bye	Khomrova (UKR); L 11–15	Did not advance				
Irena Więckowska	Individual sabre	Byrne (IRL); W 15–8	Nechaeva (RUS); W 15–12	Bao Yy (CHN); L 6–15	Did not advance			
Bogna Jóźwiak; Aleksandra Socha; Irena Więckowska	Team sabre	—N/a			China; L 25–45	Classification semi-final Canada; W 45–44	5th place final Russia; W 36–45	6

== Gymnastics ==
=== Artistic ===
Men

Athlete	Event	Qualification								Final							
Athlete	Event	Apparatus						Total	Rank	Apparatus						Total	Rank
Athlete	Event	F	PH	R	V	PB	HB	Total	Rank	F	PH	R	V	PB	HB	Total	Rank
Leszek Blanik	Vault	—N/a			16.587	—N/a		16.587	3 Q	—N/a			16.537	—N/a		16.537	1st place, gold medalist(s)

Women

Athlete	Event	Qualification						Final					
Athlete	Event	Apparatus				Total	Rank	Apparatus				Total	Rank
Athlete	Event	F	V	UB	BB	Total	Rank	F	V	UB	BB	Total	Rank
Marta Pihan	All-around	14.125	13.625	14.375	13.525	55.650	46	Did not advance					

=== Rhythmic ===
Athlete	Event	Qualification						Final					
Athlete	Event	Rope	Hoop	Clubs	Ribbon	Total	Rank	Rope	Hoop	Clubs	Ribbon	Total	Rank
Joanna Mitrosz	Individual	15.950	16.250	16.025	16.000	64.225	16	Did not advance					

== Handball ==
=== Men's tournament ===
Roster

The following is the Poland roster in the men's handball tournament of the 2008 Summer Olympics.

Head coach: Bogdan Wenta

No.	Pos.	Name	Date of birth (age)	Height	App.	Goals	Club
1	GK	Sławomir Szmal	2 October 1978 (aged 29)	1.90 m	140	1	(Germany) Rhein-Neckar Löwen
2	CB	Bartłomiej Jaszka	16 June 1983 (aged 25)	1.84 m	45	49	(Germany) Füchse Berlin
3	RB	Krzysztof Lijewski	7 July 1983 (aged 25)	1.98 m	62	100	(Germany) HSV Handball
5	LW	Mateusz Jachlewski	27 December 1984 (aged 23)	1.82 m	62	152	(Poland) Vive Targi Kielce
6	CB	Grzegorz Tkaczyk	22 December 1980 (aged 27)	1.94 m	115	435	(Germany) Rhein-Neckar Löwen
8	LB	Karol Bielecki	23 January 1982 (aged 26)	2.02 m	106	510	(Germany) Rhein-Neckar Löwen
9	P	Artur Siódmiak	7 October 1975 (aged 32)	1.92 m	75	74	(Germany) TuS Nettelstedt
13	P	Bartosz Jurecki	31 January 1979 (aged 29)	1.93 m	83	273	(Germany) SC Magdeburg
14	RW	Mariusz Jurasik	4 May 1976 (aged 32)	1.92 m	151	551	(Germany) Rhein-Neckar Löwen
15	LB	Michał Jurecki	24 October 1984 (aged 23)	2.02 m	59	103	(Germany) TuS Nettelstedt
16	GK	Marcin Wichary	17 February 1980 (aged 28)	1.93 m	60	0	(Poland) Wisła Płock
19	LW	Tomasz Tłuczyński	19 April 1979 (aged 29)	1.82 m	49	179	(Germany) TSV Hannover-Burgdorf
22	RB	Marcin Lijewski	21 September 1977 (aged 30)	1.97 m	183	558	(Germany) SG Flensburg-Handewitt
28	RW	Paweł Piwko	7 October 1982 (aged 25)	1.88 m	0	0	(Poland) Chrobry Głogów

Group play

Team	Pld	W	D	L	GF	GA	GD	Pts	Qualification
France	5	4	1	0	148	115	+33	9	Qualified for the quarterfinals
Poland	5	3	1	1	147	128	+19	7	Qualified for the quarterfinals
Croatia	5	3	0	2	140	115	+25	6	Qualified for the quarterfinals
Spain	5	3	0	2	152	145	+7	6	Qualified for the quarterfinals
Brazil	5	1	0	4	129	153	−24	2	
China	5	0	0	5	104	164	−60	0	

10 August 2008; 19:00	Poland	33 – 19	China	Olympic Sports Centre Gymnasium; Referees: Karbaschi, Kolahdouzan (IRI)
10 August 2008; 19:00	Jurasik 8	(21–10)	five players 3	Olympic Sports Centre Gymnasium; Referees: Karbaschi, Kolahdouzan (IRI)
10 August 2008; 19:00	3× (yellow card) 3× (suspension)	Report	3× (yellow card) 3× (suspension)	Olympic Sports Centre Gymnasium; Referees: Karbaschi, Kolahdouzan (IRI)

12 August 2008; 15:45	Spain	30 – 29	Poland	Olympic Sports Centre Gymnasium; Referees: Chernega, Poladenko (RUS)
12 August 2008; 15:45	Rocas 7	(16–17)	Jurasik, Lijewski 4	Olympic Sports Centre Gymnasium; Referees: Chernega, Poladenko (RUS)
12 August 2008; 15:45	3× (yellow card) 1× (suspension)	Report	4× (yellow card) 5× (suspension)	Olympic Sports Centre Gymnasium; Referees: Chernega, Poladenko (RUS)

14 August 2008; 10:45	Poland	28 – 25	Brazil	Olympic Sports Centre Gymnasium; Referees: Karbaschi, Kolahdouzan (IRI)
14 August 2008; 10:45	Jurecki, Tłuczyński 6	(14–15)	Ribeiro 7	Olympic Sports Centre Gymnasium; Referees: Karbaschi, Kolahdouzan (IRI)
14 August 2008; 10:45	3× (yellow card) 2× (suspension)	Report	3× (yellow card) 5× (suspension)	Olympic Sports Centre Gymnasium; Referees: Karbaschi, Kolahdouzan (IRI)

16 August 2008; 19:00	Croatia	24 – 27	Poland	Olympic Sports Centre Gymnasium; Referees: Gjeding, Hansen (DEN)
16 August 2008; 19:00	Džomba 7	(12–13)	Tłuczyński 7	Olympic Sports Centre Gymnasium; Referees: Gjeding, Hansen (DEN)
16 August 2008; 19:00	3× (yellow card) 2× (suspension)	Report	2× (yellow card) 2× (suspension)	Olympic Sports Centre Gymnasium; Referees: Gjeding, Hansen (DEN)

18 August 2008; 20:45	Poland	30 – 30	France	Olympic Sports Centre Gymnasium; Referees: Liudowyk, Vakula (UKR)
18 August 2008; 20:45	Jurecki 7	(16–13)	Karabatić 8	Olympic Sports Centre Gymnasium; Referees: Liudowyk, Vakula (UKR)
18 August 2008; 20:45	2× (yellow card) 2× (suspension)	Report	3× (yellow card) 3× (suspension)	Olympic Sports Centre Gymnasium; Referees: Liudowyk, Vakula (UKR)

Quarterfinal

20 August 2008; 14:15	Poland	30 – 32	Iceland	Olympic Sports Centre Gymnasium; Referees: Bord, Buy (FRA)
20 August 2008; 14:15	Jachlewski, Tkaczyk 6	(19–14)	Petersson 6	Olympic Sports Centre Gymnasium; Referees: Bord, Buy (FRA)
20 August 2008; 14:15	3× (yellow card) 8× (suspension) 1× (red card)	Report	2× (yellow card) 3× (suspension)	Olympic Sports Centre Gymnasium; Referees: Bord, Buy (FRA)

Classification semifinal

22 August 2008; 14:15	Poland	29 – 26	South Korea	Beijing National Indoor Stadium; Referees: Canbro, Claesson (SWE)
22 August 2008; 14:15	Jurasik 7	(15–14)	Yoon Kyung-shin 6	Beijing National Indoor Stadium; Referees: Canbro, Claesson (SWE)
22 August 2008; 14:15	3× (yellow card) 3× (suspension)	Report	3× (yellow card) 5× (suspension)	Beijing National Indoor Stadium; Referees: Canbro, Claesson (SWE)

5th–6th place

24 August 2008; 10:15	Russia	28 – 29	Poland	Beijing National Indoor Stadium; Referees: Karbaschi, Kolahdouzan (IRI)
24 August 2008; 10:15	Kokcharov 10	(15–14)	Jurasik 6	Beijing National Indoor Stadium; Referees: Karbaschi, Kolahdouzan (IRI)
24 August 2008; 10:15	4× (yellow card) 5× (suspension)	Report	4× (yellow card) 4× (suspension)	Beijing National Indoor Stadium; Referees: Karbaschi, Kolahdouzan (IRI)

== Judo ==
Men

Athlete	Event	Preliminary	Round of 32	Round of 16	Quarterfinals	Semifinals	Repechage 1	Repechage 2	Repechage 3	Final / BM	
Athlete	Event	Opposition Result	Opposition Result	Opposition Result	Opposition Result	Opposition Result	Opposition Result	Opposition Result	Opposition Result	Opposition Result	Rank
Tomasz Adamiec	−66 kg	Bye	Miresmaeili (IRI); L 0000–0001	Did not advance							
Krzysztof Wiłkomirski	−73 kg	—N/a	Zeļonijs (LAT); W 0020–0010	Dashdavaa (MGL); L 0010–0012	Did not advance						
Robert Krawczyk	−81 kg	Bye	Jago (RSA); W 0120–0000	Kim J-B (KOR); L 0001–1100	Did not advance		Shundzikau (BLR); W 0011–0010	Neto (POR); W 1000–0000	Nyamkhüü (MGL); L 0001–1010	Did not advance	
Przemysław Matyjaszek	−100 kg	—N/a	Shao N (CHN); W 1101–0000	Costa (ARG); W 1001–0000	Grol (NED); L 0000–1000	Did not advance	Bye	Corrêa (BRA); W 1000–0000	Hadfi (HUN); W 0011–0010	Miraliyev (AZE); L 0001–0110	5
Janusz Wojnarowicz	+100 kg	Bye	Makhgal (MGL); W 1000–0000	Tangriev (UZB); L 0000–0010	Did not advance		Tölzer (GER); L 0010–0100	Did not advance			

Women

Athlete	Event	Round of 32	Round of 16	Quarterfinals	Semifinals	Repechage 1	Repechage 2	Repechage 3	Final / BM	
Athlete	Event	Opposition Result	Opposition Result	Opposition Result	Opposition Result	Opposition Result	Opposition Result	Opposition Result	Opposition Result	Rank
Katarzyna Piłocik	−70 kg	Bye	Rousey (USA); L 0000–1000	Did not advance						
Urszula Sadkowska	+78 kg	Issanova (KAZ); L 0010–0101	Did not advance							

== Modern pentathlon ==
Athlete	Event	Shooting (10 m air pistol)			Fencing (épée one touch)			Swimming (200 m freestyle)			Riding (show jumping)			Running (3000 m)			Total points	Final rank
Athlete	Event	Points	Rank	MP Points	Results	Rank	MP points	Time	Rank	MP points	Penalties	Rank	MP points	Time	Rank	MP Points	Total points	Final rank
Marcin Horbacz	Men's	185	8	1156	14–21	29	736	2:03.52	10	1320	112	11	1088	9:49.27	28	1044	5344	13
Bartosz Majewski	Men's	176	28	1048	18–17	13	832	2:09.14	26	1252	300	24	900	9:15.71	4	1180	5212	22
Paulina Boenisz	Women's	183	10	1132	21–14	=9	904	2:24.08	27	1192	104	20	1096	10:20.95	6	1240	5564	6
Sylwia Czwojdzińska	Women's	174	26	1024	21–14	=9	904	2:18.76	16	1256	160	27	1040	10:52.41	20	1112	5336	17

== Rowing ==
Men

Athlete	Event	Heats		Repechage		Semifinals		Final	
Athlete	Event	Time	Rank	Time	Rank	Time	Rank	Time	Rank
Jarosław Godek; Piotr Hojka	Pair	7:01.90	4 R	6:44.19	5 FC	Bye		6:53.68	14
Michał Jeliński; Marek Kolbowicz; Adam Korol; Konrad Wasielewski	Quadruple sculls	5:38.76	1 SA/B	Bye		5:51.29	1 FA	5:41.33	1st place, gold medalist(s)
Miłosz Bernatajtys; Bartłomiej Pawełczak; Łukasz Pawłowski; Paweł Rańda	Lightweight four	5:52.06	3 SA/B	Bye		6:06.60	1 FA	5:49.39	2nd place, silver medalist(s)
Patryk Brzeziński; Piotr Buchalski; Mikołaj Burda; Wojciech Gutorski; Rafał Hejmej; Sebastian Kosiorek; Sławomir Kruszkowski; Michał Stawowski; Daniel Trojanowski	Eight	5:34.95	2 R	5:42.92	4 FA	—N/a		5:31.42	5

Women

Athlete	Event	Heats		Quarterfinals		Semifinals		Final	
Athlete	Event	Time	Rank	Time	Rank	Time	Rank	Time	Rank
Julia Michalska	Single sculls	7:41.16	2 QF	7:31.90	2 SA/B	7:38.04	3 FA	7:43.44	6

Qualification Legend: FA=Final A (medal); FB=Final B (non-medal); FC=Final C (non-medal); FD=Final D (non-medal); FE=Final E (non-medal); FF=Final F (non-medal); SA/B=Semifinals A/B; SC/D=Semifinals C/D; SE/F=Semifinals E/F; QF=Quarterfinals; R=Repechage

== Sailing ==
Men

Athlete	Event	Race											Net points	Final rank
Athlete	Event	1	2	3	4	5	6	7	8	9	10	M*	Net points	Final rank
Przemysław Miarczyński	RS:X	17	21	~~27~~	20	15	2	7	1	15	18	EL	116	16
Maciej Grabowski	Laser	9	19	22	18	16	23	~~32~~	20	4	CAN	EL	131	16
Patryk Piasecki; Kacper Ziemiński	470	20	9	20	23	17	16	8	~~24~~	23	15	EL	151	19
Mateusz Kusznierewicz; Dominik Życki	Star	5	6	8	2	10	9	3	5	9	~~13~~	2	59	4

Women

Athlete	Event	Race											Net points	Final rank
Athlete	Event	1	2	3	4	5	6	7	8	9	10	M*	Net points	Final rank
Zofia Klepacka	RS:X	~~17~~	16	17	5	4	2	1	1	3	17	16	82	7
Katarzyna Szotyńska	Laser Radial	5	21	11	~~24~~	21	5	2	20	12	CAN	12	109	9

Open

Athlete	Event	Race																Net points	Final rank
Athlete	Event	1	2	3	4	5	6	7	8	9	10	11	12	13	14	15	M*	Net points	Final rank
Rafał Szukiel	Finn	3	2	19	12	10	14	~~22~~	12	CAN	CAN	—N/a					10	82	10
Marcin Czajkowski; Krzysztof Kierkowski	49er	19	15	6	12	15	14	18	18	16	9	~~19~~	6	CAN	CAN	CAN	EL	147	16

M = Medal race; EL = Eliminated – did not advance into the medal race; CAN = Race cancelled

== Shooting ==
Men

Athlete	Event	Qualification		Final	
Athlete	Event	Points	Rank	Points	Rank
Wojciech Knapik	10 m air pistol	577	24	Did not advance	
Wojciech Knapik	50 m pistol	543	39	Did not advance	
Robert Kraskowski	10 m air rifle	589	33	Did not advance	
Robert Kraskowski	50 m rifle prone	591	25	Did not advance	
Robert Kraskowski	50 m rifle 3 positions	1156	33	Did not advance	

Women

Athlete	Event	Qualification		Final	
Athlete	Event	Points	Rank	Points	Rank
Sylwia Bogacka	10 m air rifle	397	7 Q	495.7	8
Sylwia Bogacka	50 m rifle 3 positions	582	10	Did not advance	
Mirosława Sagun-Lewandowska	10 m air pistol	384	7 Q	481.3	5
Mirosława Sagun-Lewandowska	25 m pistol	574	30	Did not advance	
Agnieszka Staroń	10 m air rifle	393	25	Did not advance	
Agnieszka Staroń	50 m rifle 3 positions	581	11	Did not advance	
Sławomira Szpek	10 m air pistol	378	30	Did not advance	
Sławomira Szpek	25 m pistol	575	27	Did not advance	

== Swimming ==
Men

Athlete	Event	Heat		Semifinal		Final	
Athlete	Event	Time	Rank	Time	Rank	Time	Rank
Łukasz Gąsior	200 m freestyle	1:49.25	34	Did not advance			
Maciej Hreniak	1500 m freestyle	15:16.16	24	—N/a		Did not advance	
Bartosz Kizierowski	50 m freestyle	22.15	15 Q	22.12	15	Did not advance	
Paweł Korzeniowski	400 m freestyle	3:48.78	22	—N/a		Did not advance	
Paweł Korzeniowski	200 m butterfly	1:55.21	5 Q	1:55.35	8 Q	1:54.60	6
Mateusz Sawrymowicz	1500 m freestyle	14:50.30	9	—N/a		Did not advance	
Przemysław Stańczyk	400 m freestyle	3:48.11	19	—N/a		Did not advance	
Łukasz Wójt	200 m individual medley	2:01.54	26	Did not advance			
Łukasz Gąsior; Michał Rokicki; Przemysław Stańczyk; Łukasz Wójt	4 × 200 m freestyle relay	7:18.09	14	—N/a		Did not advance	

Women

Athlete	Event	Heat		Semifinal		Final	
Athlete	Event	Time	Rank	Time	Rank	Time	Rank
Katarzyna Baranowska	200 m individual medley	2:12.47	9 Q	2:12.13 NR	7 Q	2:13.36	8
Katarzyna Baranowska	400 m individual medley	4:36.95 NR	9	—N/a		Did not advance	
Paulina Barzycka	200 m freestyle	2:00.92	32	Did not advance			
Otylia Jędrzejczak	400 m freestyle	4:05.50	9	—N/a		Did not advance	
Otylia Jędrzejczak	100 m butterfly	58.53	17	Did not advance			
Otylia Jędrzejczak	200 m butterfly	2:06.91	5 Q	2:06.78	4 Q	2:07.02	4
Agata Ewa Korc	50 m freestyle	25.14 NR	17	Did not advance			
Agata Ewa Korc	100 m freestyle	55.14 NR	20	Did not advance			
Zuzanna Mazurek	100 m backstroke	1:02.77 NR	36	Did not advance			
Zuzanna Mazurek	200 m backstroke	2:12.46 NR	21	Did not advance			
Karolina Szczepaniak	800 m freestyle	9:08.87	35	—N/a		Did not advance	
Katarzyna Baranowska; Paulina Barzycka; Katarzyna Wilk; Karolina Szczepaniak	4 × 200 m freestyle relay	8:07.40	15	—N/a		Did not advance	

== Table tennis ==
Singles

Athlete	Event	Preliminary round	Round 1	Round 2	Round 3	Round 4	Quarterfinals	Semifinals	Final / BM	
Athlete	Event	Opposition Result	Opposition Result	Opposition Result	Opposition Result	Opposition Result	Opposition Result	Opposition Result	Opposition Result	Rank
Lucjan Błaszczyk	Men's singles	Bye	Saka (CGO); W 4–0	Korbel (CZE); W 4–2	Wang Lq (CHN); L 0–4	Did not advance				
Xu Jie	Women's singles	Bye	Xian Y F (FRA); L 3–4	Did not advance						
Li Qian	Women's singles	Bye		Kostromina (BLR); L 2–4	Did not advance					

Team

Athlete	Event	Group round		Semifinals	Bronze playoff 1	Bronze playoff 2	Bronze medal	Final	
Athlete	Event	Opposition Result	Rank	Opposition Result	Opposition Result	Opposition Result	Opposition Result	Opposition Result	Rank
Xu Jie; Li Qian; Natalia Partyka	Women's team	Group C Hong Kong; L 0–3; Romania; L 2–3; Germany; W 3–1	3	Did not advance					

== Tennis ==
Athlete	Event	Round of 64	Round of 32	Round of 16	Quarterfinals	Semifinals	Final / BM	
Athlete	Event	Opposition Score	Opposition Score	Opposition Score	Opposition Score	Opposition Score	Opposition Score	Rank
Mariusz Fyrstenberg; Marcin Matkowski	Men's doubles	—N/a	Yu Xy / Zeng Sx (CHN); W 6–3, 6–4	Damm / Vízner (CZE); W 1–6, 7–6^{(7–3)}, 7–5	Aspelin / Johansson (SWE); L 6–7^{(5–7)}, 4–6	Did not advance		
Marta Domachowska	Women's singles	Pironkova (BUL); L 3–6, 4–6	Did not advance					
Agnieszka Radwańska	Women's singles	Chan Y-J (TPE); W 6–1, 7–6^{(8–6)}	Schiavone (ITA); L 3–6, 6–7^{(6–8)}	Did not advance				
Marta Domachowska; Agnieszka Radwańska	Women's doubles	—N/a	A Bondarenko / K Bondarenko (UKR); L 3–6, 2–6	Did not advance				
Klaudia Jans; Alicja Rosolska	Women's doubles	—N/a	Davenport / Huber (USA); L 2–6, 1–6	Did not advance				

== Triathlon ==
Athlete	Event	Swim (1.5 km)	Trans 1	Bike (40 km)	Trans 2	Run (10 km)	Total Time	Rank
Marek Jaskółka	Men's	18:55	0:29	Lapped				
Maria Cześnik	Women's	20:02	0:30	1:06:58	0:37	38:05	2:06:12.02	35
Ewa Dederko	Women's	21:02	0:29	1:05:24	0:32	37:42	2:05:09.85	30

== Volleyball ==
=== Indoor ===
Poland entered a team in both the men's and the women's tournament. The men's team won four out of five matches in the group play, finishing third in the group, and advancing to the quarterfinals, where they lost over five sets to Italy. Their final ranking was tied for 5th place. The women's team managed to win only one match in the group play, finishing fifth in the group, and failing to advance further in the tournament. Their final ranking was tied for 9th place.

==== Men's tournament ====
Roster

The following is the Polish roster in the men's volleyball tournament of the 2008 Summer Olympics.

Head Coach: (Argentina) Raúl Lozano

№	Name	Date of birth	Height	Weight	Spike	Block	2008 club
2	Michał Winiarski	28 September 1983	2.00 m (6 ft 7 in)	82 kg (181 lb)	355 cm (140 in)	335 cm (132 in)	(Italy) Itas Diatec Trentino
3	Piotr Gruszka (c)	8 March 1977	2.06 m (6 ft 9 in)	102 kg (225 lb)	355 cm (140 in)	330 cm (130 in)	(Turkey) Arkas Izmir
4	Daniel Pliński	10 December 1978	2.05 m (6 ft 9 in)	99 kg (218 lb)	350 cm (140 in)	330 cm (130 in)	(Poland) Skra Bełchatów
5	Paweł Zagumny	18 October 1977	2.00 m (6 ft 7 in)	88 kg (194 lb)	336 cm (132 in)	317 cm (125 in)	(Poland) AZS Olsztyn
8	Marcin Wika	9 November 1983	1.94 m (6 ft 4 in)	86 kg (190 lb)	335 cm (132 in)	310 cm (120 in)	(Poland) Asseco Resovia
10	Mariusz Wlazły	4 August 1983	1.97 m (6 ft 6 in)	75 kg (165 lb)	362 cm (143 in)	343 cm (135 in)	(Poland) Skra Bełchatów
11	Łukasz Kadziewicz	20 September 1980	2.06 m (6 ft 9 in)	84 kg (185 lb)	360 cm (140 in)	335 cm (132 in)	(Poland) Trefl Gdańsk
12	Paweł Woicki	29 June 1983	1.82 m (6 ft 0 in)	75 kg (165 lb)	315 cm (124 in)	300 cm (120 in)	(Poland) Asseco Resovia
13	Sebastian Świderski	26 June 1977	1.93 m (6 ft 4 in)	88 kg (194 lb)	354 cm (139 in)	325 cm (128 in)	(Italy) Lube Banca Marche
14	Krzysztof Gierczyński	23 January 1976	1.93 m (6 ft 4 in)	81 kg (179 lb)	337 cm (133 in)	324 cm (128 in)	(Poland) Asseco Resovia
16	Krzysztof Ignaczak (L)	15 May 1978	1.88 m (6 ft 2 in)	86 kg (190 lb)	330 cm (130 in)	315 cm (124 in)	(Poland) Asseco Resovia
18	Marcin Możdżonek	9 February 1985	2.11 m (6 ft 11 in)	93 kg (205 lb)	355 cm (140 in)	335 cm (132 in)	(Poland) AZS Olsztyn

Group play

Pos	Team	Pld	W	L	Pts	SPW	SPL	SPR	SW	SL	SR	Qualification
1	Brazil	5	4	1	9	427	373	1.145	13	4	3.250	Quarterfinals
2	Russia	5	4	1	9	496	447	1.110	14	7	2.000	Quarterfinals
3	Poland	5	4	1	9	434	404	1.074	12	6	2.000	Quarterfinals
4	Serbia	5	2	3	7	440	439	1.002	9	10	0.900	Quarterfinals
5	Germany	5	1	4	6	418	440	0.950	6	12	0.500	
6	Egypt	5	0	5	5	267	379	0.704	0	15	0.000	

10 August 2008; 22:20	Poland	3–0	Germany	Capital Indoor Stadium, Beijing; Attendance: 5,700; Referees: Frans Loderus (NED), Massimo Menghini (ITA)
10 August 2008; 22:20	(25–17, 33–31, 25–20) result statistics			Capital Indoor Stadium, Beijing; Attendance: 5,700; Referees: Frans Loderus (NED), Massimo Menghini (ITA)

12 August 2008; 13:00	Egypt	0–3	Poland	Beijing Institute of Technology Gymnasium, Beijing; Attendance: 3,000; Referees: Mohammad Shahmiri (IRI), Patricia Salvatore (USA)
12 August 2008; 13:00	(21–25, 18–25, 10–25) result statistics			Beijing Institute of Technology Gymnasium, Beijing; Attendance: 3,000; Referees: Mohammad Shahmiri (IRI), Patricia Salvatore (USA)

14 August 2008; 15:05	Poland	3–1	Serbia	Capital Indoor Stadium, Beijing; Attendance: 7,000; Referees: Umit Sokullu (TUR), Patrick Deregnaucourt (FRA)
14 August 2008; 15:05	(31–29, 22–25, 25–22, 25–21) result statistics			Capital Indoor Stadium, Beijing; Attendance: 7,000; Referees: Umit Sokullu (TUR), Patrick Deregnaucourt (FRA)

16 August 2008; 20:00	Brazil	3–0	Poland	Capital Indoor Stadium, Beijing; Attendance: 12,500; Referees: Kun-Tae Kim (KOR), Osamu Sakaide (JPN)
16 August 2008; 20:00	(30–28, 25–19, 25–19) result statistics			Capital Indoor Stadium, Beijing; Attendance: 12,500; Referees: Kun-Tae Kim (KOR), Osamu Sakaide (JPN)

18 August 2008; 12:30	Poland	3–2	Russia	Capital Indoor Stadium, Beijing; Attendance: 12,000; Referees: Frans Loderus (NED), Frank Leuthauser (GER)
18 August 2008; 12:30	(17–25, 26–24, 24–26, 25–23, 15–12) result statistics			Capital Indoor Stadium, Beijing; Attendance: 12,000; Referees: Frans Loderus (NED), Frank Leuthauser (GER)

Quarterfinal

20 August 2008; 12:15	Italy	3–2	Poland	Capital Indoor Stadium, Beijing; Attendance: 8,000; Referees: Umit Sokullu (TUR), Patrick Deregnaucourt (FRA)
20 August 2008; 12:15	(25–19, 25–22, 18–25, 26–28, 17–15) result statistics			Capital Indoor Stadium, Beijing; Attendance: 8,000; Referees: Umit Sokullu (TUR), Patrick Deregnaucourt (FRA)

==== Women's tournament ====
Roster

The following is the Polish roster in the women's volleyball tournament of the 2008 Summer Olympics.

Head Coach: (Italy) Marco Bonitta

№	Name	Date of birth	Height	Weight	Spike	Block	2008 club
1	Katarzyna Skowrońska	30 June 1983	1.89 m (6 ft 2 in)	75 kg (165 lb)	314 cm (124 in)	296 cm (117 in)	(Italy) Asystel Novara
2	Mariola Zenik (L)	3 July 1982	1.74 m (5 ft 9 in)	64 kg (141 lb)	300 cm (120 in)	290 cm (110 in)	(Poland) Muszynianka Muszyna
4	Katarzyna Gajgał	21 September 1981	1.90 m (6 ft 3 in)	85 kg (187 lb)	300 cm (120 in)	287 cm (113 in)	(Poland) BKS Bielsko-Biała
6	Anna Podolec	30 October 1985	1.95 m (6 ft 5 in)	71 kg (157 lb)	318 cm (125 in)	305 cm (120 in)	(Russia) Balakovskaia AES Balakovo
7	Małgorzata Glinka	30 September 1978	1.93 m (6 ft 4 in)	84 kg (185 lb)	314 cm (124 in)	303 cm (119 in)	(Spain) Grupo 2002 Murcia
9	Agnieszka Bednarek	20 February 1986	1.85 m (6 ft 1 in)	70 kg (150 lb)	309 cm (122 in)	292 cm (115 in)	(Poland) PTPS Nafta Gaz Piła
11	Anna Barańska	15 May 1984	1.79 m (5 ft 10 in)	66 kg (146 lb)	308 cm (121 in)	292 cm (115 in)	(Poland) Winiary Kalisz
12	Milena Sadurek	18 October 1984	1.77 m (5 ft 10 in)	65 kg (143 lb)	302 cm (119 in)	295 cm (116 in)	(Poland) BKS Bielsko-Biała
13	Milena Rosner (c)	4 January 1980	1.79 m (5 ft 10 in)	67 kg (148 lb)	307 cm (121 in)	292 cm (115 in)	(Italy) Foppapedretti Bergamo
14	Maria Liktoras	20 February 1975	1.92 m (6 ft 4 in)	73 kg (161 lb)	312 cm (123 in)	302 cm (119 in)	(Russia) Dynamo Moscow
17	Joanna Kaczor	16 September 1984	1.93 m (6 ft 4 in)	64 kg (141 lb)	305 cm (120 in)	290 cm (110 in)	(Poland) Impel Gwardia
18	Katarzyna Skorupa	16 September 1984	1.84 m (6 ft 0 in)	69 kg (152 lb)	302 cm (119 in)	296 cm (117 in)	(Poland) PTPS Piła

Group play

Pos	Team	Pld	W	L	Pts	SPW	SPL	SPR	SW	SL	SR	Qualification
1	Cuba	5	5	0	10	426	371	1.148	15	3	5.000	Quarterfinals
2	United States	5	4	1	9	459	441	1.041	12	9	1.333	Quarterfinals
3	China	5	3	2	8	467	395	1.182	13	7	1.857	Quarterfinals
4	Japan	5	2	3	7	381	389	0.979	7	11	0.636	Quarterfinals
5	Poland	5	1	4	6	441	445	0.991	9	12	0.750	
6	Venezuela	5	0	5	5	262	395	0.663	1	15	0.067	

9 August 2008; 14:30	Poland	1–3	Cuba	Capital Indoor Stadium; Attendance: 14,000; Referees: Kim Kun-Tae (South Korea), Janpen Jirakakul (Thailand)
9 August 2008; 14:30	(25–21, 17–25, 20–25, 17–25) result statistics			Capital Indoor Stadium; Attendance: 14,000; Referees: Kim Kun-Tae (South Korea), Janpen Jirakakul (Thailand)

11 August 2008; 20:00	China	3–1	Poland	Capital Indoor Stadium; Attendance: 12,000; Referees: Victor Manuel Rodriguez (Puerto Rico), Francisco de Souza (Brazil)
11 August 2008; 20:00	(22–25, 25–15, 25–20, 25–22) result statistics			Capital Indoor Stadium; Attendance: 12,000; Referees: Victor Manuel Rodriguez (Puerto Rico), Francisco de Souza (Brazil)

13 August 2008; 22:30	Poland	2–3	Japan	Capital Indoor Stadium; Attendance: 5,400; Referees: Humberto Salas (Mexico), Francisco de Souza (Brazil)
13 August 2008; 22:30	(21–25, 20–25, 25–18, 25–23, 11–15) result statistics			Capital Indoor Stadium; Attendance: 5,400; Referees: Humberto Salas (Mexico), Francisco de Souza (Brazil)

15 August 2008; 12:30	Venezuela	0–3	Poland	Capital Indoor Stadium; Attendance: 11,000; Referees: Janpen Jirakakul (Thailand), Humberto Salas (Mexico)
15 August 2008; 12:30	(12–25, 12–25, 20–25) result statistics			Capital Indoor Stadium; Attendance: 11,000; Referees: Janpen Jirakakul (Thailand), Humberto Salas (Mexico)

17 August 2008; 12:30	Poland	2–3	United States	Capital Indoor Stadium; Attendance: 11,000; Referees: Ibrahim al-Naama (Qatar), Francisco de Souza (Brazil)
17 August 2008; 12:30	(25–18, 21–25, 25–19, 19–25, 13–15) result statistics			Capital Indoor Stadium; Attendance: 11,000; Referees: Ibrahim al-Naama (Qatar), Francisco de Souza (Brazil)

== Weightlifting ==
Men

Athlete	Event	Snatch		Clean & Jerk		Total	Rank
Athlete	Event	Result	Rank	Result	Rank	Total	Rank
Krzysztof Szramiak	−77 kg	161	6	191	9	352	8
Bartłomiej Bonk	−94 kg	175	8	~~211~~	DNF	175	DNF
Szymon Kołecki	−94 kg	179	2	224	1	403	1st place, gold medalist(s)
Marcin Dołęga	−105 kg	195	2	225	6	420	3rd place, bronze medalist(s)
Robert Dołęga	−105 kg	184	5	221	8	405	7
Grzegorz Kleszcz	+105 kg	185	8	234	5	419	7

Women

Athlete	Event	Snatch		Clean & Jerk		Total	Rank
Athlete	Event	Result	Rank	Result	Rank	Total	Rank
Marzena Karpińska	−48 kg	79	7	92	7	171	7
Marieta Gotfryd	−58 kg	90	9	110	9	200	9
Aleksandra Klejnowska	−58 kg	95	6	120	5	215	6
Dominika Misterska	−63 kg	94	10	117	10	211	10

== Wrestling ==
Key:

- VT – Victory by Fall.
- PP – Decision by Points – the loser with technical points.
- PO – Decision by Points – the loser without technical points.

Men's freestyle

Athlete	Event	Qualification	Round of 16	Quarterfinal	Semifinal	Repechage 1	Repechage 2	Final / BM	
Athlete	Event	Opposition Result	Opposition Result	Opposition Result	Opposition Result	Opposition Result	Opposition Result	Opposition Result	Rank
Krystian Brzozowski	−74 kg	Gitinov (KGZ); L 1–3 ^{PP}	Did not advance						16
Radosław Horbik	−84 kg	Yazdani (IRI); L 0–3 ^{PO}	Did not advance						16
Mateusz Gucman	−96 kg	Gazyumov (AZE); L 0–3 ^{PO}	Did not advance						17
Bartłomiej Bartnicki	−120 kg	Liang L (CHN); L 0–3 ^{PO}	Did not advance						12

Men's Greco-Roman

Athlete	Event	Qualification	Round of 16	Quarterfinal	Semifinal	Repechage 1	Repechage 2	Final / BM	
Athlete	Event	Opposition Result	Opposition Result	Opposition Result	Opposition Result	Opposition Result	Opposition Result	Opposition Result	Rank
Julian Kwit	−74 kg	Bye	Mikhalovich (BLR); L 1–3 ^{PP}	Did not advance					13
Artur Michalkiewicz	−84 kg	Abrahamian (SWE); L 1–3 ^{PP}	Did not advance						16
Marek Mikulski	−120 kg	Sjöberg (SWE); L 1–3 ^{PP}	Did not advance						12

Women's freestyle

Athlete	Event	Qualification	Round of 16	Quarterfinal	Semifinal	Repechage 1	Repechage 2	Final / BM	
Athlete	Event	Opposition Result	Opposition Result	Opposition Result	Opposition Result	Opposition Result	Opposition Result	Opposition Result	Rank
Monika Michalik	−63 kg	Bye	Khilko (BLR); W 5–0 ^{VT}	Legrand (FRA); L 1–3 ^{PP}	Did not advance				8
Agnieszka Wieszczek	−72 kg	—N/a	Ali (CMR); W 3–0 ^{PO}	Schätzle (GER); W 3–1 ^{PP}	Zlateva (BUL); L 0–3 ^{PO}	Bye		Unda (ESP); W 3–1 ^{PP}	3rd place, bronze medalist(s)

== See also ==
- Poland at the 2008 Summer Paralympics
