= Fencing at the 2008 Summer Olympics – Women's team sabre =

Women's team sabre at the Games of the XXIX Olympiad
- Venue: Olympic Green Convention Centre
- Date: 14 August 2008
- Competitors: 30 from 8 nations

Medalists
1st place, gold medalist(s)		Olha Zhovnir; Olga Kharlan; Halyna Pundyk; Olena Khomrova	Ukraine
2nd place, silver medalist(s)		Bao Yingying; Huang Haiyang; Ni Hong; Tan Xue	China
3rd place, bronze medalist(s)		Sada Jacobson; Rebecca Ward; Mariel Zagunis	United States

The women's team sabre fencing competition at the Beijing 2008 Summer Olympics took place on August 14 at the Olympic Green Convention Centre.

The team sabre competition consisted of a three-round single-elimination bracket with a bronze medal match between the two semifinal losers and classification semifinals and finals for 5th to 8th places. Teams consist of three members each, and a substitute. Matches consist of nine bouts, with every fencer on one team facing each fencer on the other team. Scoring carried over between bouts with a total of 45 touches being the team goal. Bouts lasted until one team reached the target multiple of 5 touches. For example, if the first bout ended with a score of 5–3, that score would remain into the next bout and the second bout would last until one team reached 10 touches. Bouts also had a maximum time of three minutes each; if the final bout ended before either team reached 45 touches, the team leading at that point won. A tie at that point would result in an additional one-minute sudden-death time period. This sudden-death period was further modified by the selection of a draw-winner beforehand; if neither fencer scored a touch during the minute, the predetermined draw-winner won the bout.

== Draw ==
=== Finals ===
Quarterfinals
1	United States	45
8	South Africa	8
5	Ukraine	45
4	Russia	34
3	China	45
6	Poland	25
7	Canada	22
2	France	45

Semifinals
1	United States	39
5	Ukraine	45
3	China	45
2	France	38

Finals
5	Ukraine	45
3	China	44
Third place
1	United States	45
2	France	38

=== Classification 5- 8 ===
Placement 5-8
8	South Africa	13
5	Russia	45
6	Poland	45
7	Canada	44

Placement 5-6
5	Russia	45
6	Poland	36
Placement 7-8
8	South Africa	16
7	Canada	45

== Final classification ==
Rank	Team	Athlete
1st place, gold medalist(s)	Ukraine	Olha Zhovnir; Olga Kharlan; Halyna Pundyk; Olena Khomrova
2nd place, silver medalist(s)	China	Bao Yingying; Huang Haiyang; Ni Hong; Tan Xue
3rd place, bronze medalist(s)	United States	Sada Jacobson; Becca Ward; Mariel Zagunis
4	France	Anne-Lise Touya; Léonore Perrus; Carole Vergne; Solenn Mary
5	Russia	Ekaterina Fedorkina; Elena Nechaeva; Ekaterina Dyachenko; Sofiya Velikaya
6	Poland	Aleksandra Socha; Bogna Jóźwiak; Irena Więckowska
7	Canada	Olga Ovtchinnikova; Sandra Sassine; Julie Cloutier; Wendy Saschenbrecker
8	South Africa	Elvira Wood; Jyoti Chetty; Adele du Plooy; Shelley Gosher
