= South Africa at the 2008 Summer Olympics =

- IOC code: RSA
- NOC: South African Sports Confederation and Olympic Committee
- Website: www.sascoc.co.za

in Beijing
- Competitors: 136 in 19 sports
- Flag bearers: Natalie du Toit (opening); Sifiso Nhlapo (closing)
- Medals Ranked 70th: Gold 0 Silver 1 Bronze 0 Total 1

Summer Olympics appearances (overview)
- 1904; 1908; 1912; 1920; 1924; 1928; 1932; 1936; 1948; 1952; 1956; 1960; 1964–1988; 1992; 1996; 2000; 2004; 2008; 2012; 2016; 2020; 2024; 2028

South Africa competed at the 2008 Summer Olympics in Beijing, People's Republic of China. The team included 136 athletes, as of 10 July 2008. South Africa had its worst medals performance at an Olympics since 1994 (winter games), and tied its performance in the 1936 Games.

== Medalists ==
Medal	Name	Sport	Event
Silver	Godfrey Khotso Mokoena	Athletics	Men's long jump

== Archery ==
South Africa sent archers to the Olympics for the fifth time, seeking the nation's first Olympic medal in the sport. Calvin Hartley earned the country its only qualifying spot, in the men's competition, by placing first in the 2008 African championship.

Athlete	Event	Ranking round		Round of 64	Round of 32	Round of 16	Quarterfinals	Semifinals	Final / BM	
Athlete	Event	Score	Seed	Opposition Score	Opposition Score	Opposition Score	Opposition Score	Opposition Score	Opposition Score	Rank
Calvin Hartley	Men's individual	654	37	Stevens (CUB) (28); L 107 (18)–107 (19)	Did not advance					

== Athletics ==
Key

- Note–Ranks given for track events are within the athlete's heat only
- Q = Qualified for the next round
- q = Qualified for the next round as a fastest loser or, in field events, by position without achieving the qualifying target
- NR = National record
- N/A = Round not applicable for the event
- Bye = Athlete not required to compete in round

Men
Track & road events

Athlete	Event	Heat		Quarterfinal		Semifinal		Final	
Athlete	Event	Result	Rank	Result	Rank	Result	Rank	Result	Rank
Pieter de Villiers	400 m hurdles	49.24	2 Q	—N/a		49.44	7	Did not advance	
Norman Dlomo	Marathon	—N/a						2:24:28	53
Thuso Mpuang	200 m	20.87	6 Q	21.04	7	Did not advance			
Mbulaeni Mulaudzi	800 m	1:47.64	2 Q	—N/a		1:46.24	6	Did not advance	
Alwyn Myburgh	400 m hurdles	48.92 SB	3 Q	—N/a		49.16	5	Did not advance	
Samson Ngoepe	800 m	1:47.42	5	—N/a		Did not advance			
Hendrick Ramaala	Marathon	—N/a						2:22:43	44
Ruben Ramolefi	3000 m steeplechase	8:19.86 PB	1 Q	—N/a				8:34.58	14
Juan van Deventer	1500 m	3:36.32	1 Q	—N/a		3:37.75	6 Q	3:34.77	6
Louis van Zyl	400 m hurdles	48.86	2 Q	—N/a		48.57	3 Q	48.42	5
Hannes Dreyer; Gert du Plessis; Leigh Julius; Ishmael Kumbane; Thuso Mpuang; Sergio Mullins; Sibusiso Sishi	4 × 100 m relay	DNF		—N/a				Did not advance	
Ofentse Mogawane; Alwyn Myburgh; Pieter Smith; Louis van Zyl	4 × 400 m relay	3:01.26 SB	6	—N/a				Did not advance	

Field events

Athlete	Event	Qualification		Final	
Athlete	Event	Distance	Position	Distance	Position
Godfrey Khotso Mokoena	Long jump	8.14	4 Q	8.24	2nd place, silver medalist(s)
John Robert Oosthuizen	Javelin throw	76.16	19	Did not advance	

Women
Track & road events

Athlete	Event	Heat		Quarterfinal		Semifinal		Final	
Athlete	Event	Result	Rank	Result	Rank	Result	Rank	Result	Rank
René Kalmer	1500 m	4:08.41	7	—N/a				Did not advance	
Isabel Le Roux	200 m	23.67	7	Did not advance					
Tsholofelo Thipe	400 m	54.11	6	—N/a		Did not advance			

Field events

Athlete	Event	Qualification		Final	
Athlete	Event	Distance	Position	Distance	Position
Elizna Naudé	Discus throw	58.75	20	Did not advance	
Justine Robbeson	Javelin throw	59.63	13	Did not advance	
Sunette Viljoen	Javelin throw	55.58	33	Did not advance	

== Badminton ==
Athlete	Event	Round of 64	Round of 32	Round of 16	Quarterfinal	Semifinal	Final / BM	
Athlete	Event	Opposition Score	Opposition Score	Opposition Score	Opposition Score	Opposition Score	Opposition Score	Rank
Chris Dednam; Roelof Dednam	Men's doubles	—N/a		Bach / Malaythong (USA); L 10–21, 16–21	Did not advance			
Kerry-Lee Harrington	Women's singles	Bye	Wong M C (MAS); L 4–21, 4–21	Did not advance				
Chantal Botts; Michelle Edwards	Women's doubles	—N/a		Chien Y-C / Cheng W-H (TPE); L 6–21, 12–21	Did not advance			

== Boxing ==
South Africa qualified one boxer for the Olympic boxing tournament. Jackson Chauke earned a spot in the flyweight competition at the second African continental qualifying tournament.

Athlete	Event	Round of 32	Round of 16	Quarterfinals	Semifinals	Final	
Athlete	Event	Opposition Result	Opposition Result	Opposition Result	Opposition Result	Opposition Result	Rank
Jackson Chauke	Flyweight	Yunusov (TJK); L 1–9	Did not advance				

== Canoeing ==
=== Slalom ===
Athlete	Event	Preliminary						Semifinal		Final			
Athlete	Event	Run 1	Rank	Run 2	Rank	Total	Rank	Time	Rank	Time	Rank	Total	Rank
Siboniso Cele	Men's C-1	162.51	16	100.42	16	262.93	16	Did not advance					
Cameron McIntosh; Cyprian Ngidi	Men's C-2	119.83	12	157.37	12	277.20	12	Did not advance					

=== Sprint ===
Men

Athlete	Event	Heats		Semifinals		Final	
Athlete	Event	Time	Rank	Time	Rank	Time	Rank
Calvin Mokoto	C-1 500 m	2:03.372	7 QS	2:12.226	9	Did not advance	
Calvin Mokoto	C-1 1000 m	4:33.887	7 QS	4:26.650	7	Did not advance	
Shaun Rubenstein	K-1 500 m	1:37.686	5 QS	1:44.154	4	Did not advance	
Shaun Rubenstein	K-1 1000 m	3:36.134	5 QS	3:36.969	4	Did not advance	

Women

Athlete	Event	Heats		Semifinals		Final	
Athlete	Event	Time	Rank	Time	Rank	Time	Rank
Jennifer Hodson	K-1 500 m	1:51.655	3 QS	1:53.209	3 Q	1:53.353	8
Michele Eray; Bridgitte Hartley	K-2 500 m	1:43.341	8 QS	1:47.018	8	Did not advance	
Michele Eray; Jennifer Hodson; Carol Joyce; Nicola Mocke	K-4 500 m	1:37.399	3 QF	Bye		1:36.724	7

Qualification Legend: QS = Qualify to semi-final; QF = Qualify directly to final

== Cycling ==
=== Road ===
Athlete	Event	Time	Rank
John-Lee Augustyn	Men's road race	6:26:17	27
David George	Men's road race	6:39:42	80
David George	Men's time trial	1:07:55	31
Robert Hunter	Men's road race	Did not finish	
Cherise Taylor	Women's road race	3:48:33	59
Marissa van der Merwe	Women's road race	3:33:17	34

=== Mountain biking ===
Athlete	Event	Time	Rank
Burry Stander	Men's cross-country	2:01:58	15
Yolande Speedy	Women's cross-country	LAP (2 laps)	22

=== BMX ===
Athlete	Event	Seeding		Quarterfinals		Semifinals		Final	
Athlete	Event	Result	Rank	Points	Rank	Points	Rank	Result	Rank
Sifiso Nhlapo	Men's BMX	36.428	13	6	1 Q	8	2 Q	DNF	7

== Diving ==
Women

Athlete	Events	Preliminaries		Semifinals		Final	
Athlete	Events	Points	Rank	Points	Rank	Points	Rank
Jenna Dreyer	3 m springboard	210.90	28	Did not advance			

== Fencing ==
Men

Athlete	Event	Round of 64	Round of 32	Round of 16	Quarterfinal	Semifinal	Final / BM	
Athlete	Event	Opposition Score	Opposition Score	Opposition Score	Opposition Score	Opposition Score	Opposition Score	Rank
Sello Maduma	Individual épée	Kim S-G (KOR); L 12–15	Did not advance					
Dario Torrente	Individual épée	Videira (POR); L 10–15	Did not advance					
Mike Wood	Individual épée	Nikishyn (UKR); L 7–15	Did not advance					
Sello Maduma; Dario Torrente; Mike Wood; George Harrop-Allin	Team épée	—N/a		China; L 28–45	Did not advance			

Women

Athlete	Event	Round of 64	Round of 32	Round of 16	Quarterfinal	Semifinal	Final / BM	
Athlete	Event	Opposition Score	Opposition Score	Opposition Score	Opposition Score	Opposition Score	Opposition Score	Rank
Jyoti Chetty	Individual sabre	Besbes (TUN); L 2–15	Did not advance					
Adele du Plooy	Individual sabre	Pundyk (UKR); L 7–15	Did not advance					
Elvira Wood	Individual sabre	Sassine (CAN); L 2–15	Did not advance					
Jyoti Chetty; Adele du Plooy; Shelley Gosher; Elvira Wood	Team sabre	—N/a			United States; L 8–45	Classification semi-final Russia; L 13–45	7th place final Canada; L 16–45	8

== Field hockey ==
=== Men's tournament ===
Team roster

The following is the South African roster in the men's field hockey tournament of the 2008 Summer Olympics.

Head Coach: Gregg Clark

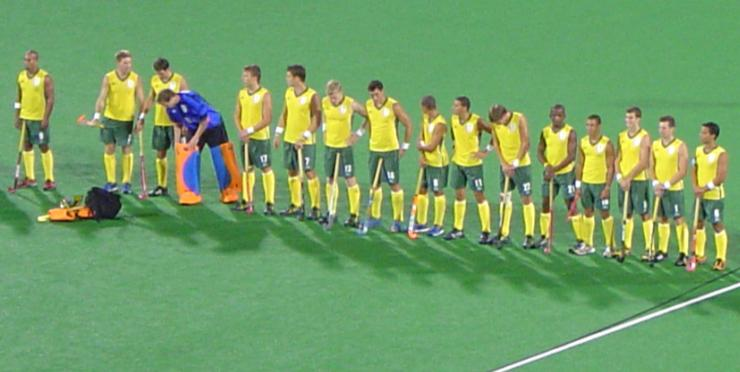
South Africa's team just before the group stage match against Great Britain. From the left: E. Smith, Symons, McDade, Hibbert, Abbott, Gallagher, Blake, Rose-Innes, Harper, Abrahams, Hammond, Tsolekile, Bam, A. Smith, Cronje, Jacobs

1. Andrew Cronje
2. Ian Symons
5. Austin Smith
6. Bruce Jacobs (c)
7. Darryn Gallagher
8. Marvin Harper
9. Emile Smith
11. Clyde Abrahams
13. Paul Blake
14. Eric Rose-Innes
16. Marvin Bam
17. Geoffrey Abbott
18. Thornton McDade
19. Chris Hibbert (GK)
21. Lungile Tsolekile
22. Thomas Hammond

Reserve:

20. Shanyl Balwanth
23. Erasmus Pieterse (GK)

Group play

Pos	Team	Pld	W	D	L	GF	GA	GD	Pts	Qualification
1	Netherlands	5	4	1	0	16	6	+10	13	Semi-finals
2	Australia	5	3	2	0	24	7	+17	11	Semi-finals
3	Great Britain	5	2	2	1	10	7	+3	8	Fifth place game
4	Pakistan	5	2	0	3	11	13	−2	6	Seventh place game
5	Canada	5	1	1	3	10	17	−7	4	Ninth place game
6	South Africa	5	0	0	5	4	25	−21	0	Eleventh place game

11 August 2008
21:00

Netherlands	5–0	South Africa
Taekema 4', 35'; Docherty 44'; Hertzberger 47'; M. Brouwer 66'	Report

Umpires:
Henrik Ehlers (DEN)
Xavier Adell (ESP)

13 August 2008
08:30

South Africa	0–10	Australia
	Report	Dwyer 2', 42'; Matheson 14', 29', 57'; Schubert 27'; Guest 35+', 38'; Kavanagh 47'; Abbott 67'

Umpires:
Andy Mair (GBR)
Roel van Eert (NED)

15 August 2008
21:00

South Africa	0–2	Great Britain
	Report	Tindall 20'; Daly 66'

Umpires:
Christian Blasch (GER)
Rob ten Cate (NED)

17 August 2008
18:00

Pakistan	3–1	South Africa
Javed 9'; Abbasi 44'; Saqlain 60'	Report	Smith 31'

Umpires:
Amarjit Singh (MAS)
Kim Hong-lae (KOR)

19 August 2008
18:00

Canada	5–3	South Africa
R. Short 15'; Fernandes 31', 46'; Grimes 38', 70'	Report	Smith 4', 51'; Tsolekile 28'

Umpires:
Roel van Eert (NED)
Satinder Kumar (IND)

Classification match for 11th/12th place

23 August 2008
08:30

China	4–3 (a.e.t.)	South Africa
Na Yubo 32'; Song Yi 53', 58', 85'	Report	Tsolekile 3'; Symons 63'; Smith 70'

Umpires:
Rob ten Cate (NED)
Satinder Kumar (IND)

=== Women's tournament ===
Team roster

The following is the South African roster in the women's field hockey tournament of the 2008 Summer Olympics.

Head Coach: Jennifer King

1. Mariette Rix (GK)
2. Vuyisanani Mangisa (GK)
3. Kate Hector
5. Taryn Hosking
7. Cindy Brown
8. Marsha Marescia (c)
10. Shelley Russell
13. Lisa-Marie Deetlefs
16. Jenny Wilson
17. Lesle-Ann George
18. Vida Ryan
19. Vidette Ryan
21. Lenise Marais
22. Kathleen Taylor
27. Fiona Butler
29. Tarryn Bright

Reserve:

20. Henriette du Buisson
23. Farrah Fredericks

Group play

Team	Pld	W	D	L	GF	GA	GD	Pts	Qualification
Netherlands	5	5	0	0	14	3	+11	15	Advanced to semifinals
China	5	3	1	1	14	4	+10	10	Advanced to semifinals
Australia	5	3	1	1	17	9	+8	10	
Spain	5	2	0	3	4	12	−8	6	
South Korea	5	1	0	4	13	18	−5	3	
South Africa	5	0	0	5	2	18	−16	0	

10 August 2008
20:30

Netherlands	6–0	South Africa
Mulder 5'; Agliotti 27'; Paumen 46', 58'; Booij 56'; Dijkstra 66'	Report

Umpires:
Lisa Roach (AUS)
Carolina de la Fuente (ARG)

12 August 2008
18:30

China	3–0	South Africa
Tang Chunling 6'; Fu Baorong 33'; Zhao Yudiao 40'	Report

Umpires:
Gina Spitaleri (ITA)
Minka Woolley (AUS)

14 August 2008
20:30

South Africa	0–3	Australia
	Report	Hudson 10'; Lambert 44'; Eastham 62'

Umpires:
Carol Metchette (IRL)
Ute Conen (GER)

16 August 2008
21:00

Spain	1–0	South Africa
Romagosa 31'	Report

Umpires:
Lee Keum-ju (KOR)
Gina Spitaleri (ITA)

18 August 2008
10:30

South Korea	5–2	South Africa
Gim Sung-hee 6'; Lee Seon-ok 23', 29'; Park Mi-hyun 32'; Kim Eun-sil 58'	Report	Hector 51'; Vida Ryan 66'

Umpires:
Stella Bartlema (NED)
Carol Metchette (IRL)

Classification match for 11th/12th place

22 August 2008
08:30

South Africa	4–1	New Zealand
Marescia 14'; Wilson 34'; Vida Ryan 51'; Brown 59'	Report	Flynn 17'

Umpires:
Lee Keum-ju (KOR)
Carol Metchette (IRL)

== Gymnastics ==
=== Rhythmic ===
Athlete	Event	Qualification						Final					
Athlete	Event	Rope	Hoop	Clubs	Ribbon	Total	Rank	Rope	Hoop	Clubs	Ribbon	Total	Rank
Odette Richard	Individual	13.975	13.950	13.800	13.775	55.500	23	Did not advance					

== Judo ==
Athlete	Event	Preliminary	Round of 32	Round of 16	Quarterfinals	Semifinals	Repechage 1	Repechage 2	Repechage 3	Final / BM	
Athlete	Event	Opposition Result	Opposition Result	Opposition Result	Opposition Result	Opposition Result	Opposition Result	Opposition Result	Opposition Result	Opposition Result	Rank
Marlon August	Men's −73 kg	—N/a	Al Qubaisi (UAE); W 1000–0000	Guilheiro (BRA); L 0000–1001	Did not advance						
Matthew Jago	Men's −81 kg	Bye	Krawczyk (POL); L 0000–0120	Did not advance							
Patrick Trezise	Men's −90 kg	—N/a	Pershin (RUS); L 0000–1000	Did not advance			Rosati (ARG); L 0000–1000	Did not advance			

== Rowing ==
Men

Athlete	Event	Heats		Repechage		Semifinals		Final	
Athlete	Event	Time	Rank	Time	Rank	Time	Rank	Time	Rank
Ramon di Clemente; Shaun Keeling	Pair	6:45.26	3 SA/B	Bye		6:37.18	3 FA	6:47.83	5

Women

Athlete	Event	Heats		Repechage		Quarterfinals		Semifinals		Final	
Athlete	Event	Time	Rank	Time	Rank	Time	Rank	Time	Rank	Time	Rank
Hendrika Geyser	Single sculls	8:20.26	4 QF	—N/a		7:44.14	4 SC/D	7:59.67	1 FC	7:35.06	13
Kirsten McCann; Alexandra White	Lightweight double sculls	7:20.51	6 R	7:48.04	4 FC	—N/a		Bye		7:20.49	14

Qualification Legend: FA=Final A (medal); FB=Final B (non-medal); FC=Final C (non-medal); FD=Final D (non-medal); FE=Final E (non-medal); FF=Final F (non-medal); SA/B=Semifinals A/B; SC/D=Semifinals C/D; SE/F=Semifinals E/F; QF=Quarterfinals; R=Repechage

== Sailing ==
Women

Athlete	Event	Race											Net points	Final rank
Athlete	Event	1	2	3	4	5	6	7	8	9	10	M*	Net points	Final rank
Penny Alison; Dominique Provoyeur; Kim Rew	Yngling	~~13~~	10	11	2	12	8	13	7	CAN	CAN	EL	63	12

M = Medal race; EL = Eliminated – did not advance into the medal race; CAN = Race cancelled

Men

Athlete	Event	Race											Net points	Final rank
Athlete	Event	1	2	3	4	5	6	7	8	9	10	M*	Net points	Final rank
Dallyn McLean	DuelRace Class	~~18~~	8	3	2	1	8	4	3	6	7	EL	36	5th

M = Medal race; EL = Eliminated – advanced into the medal race; CAN = Final Race cancelled

== Shooting ==
Women

Athlete	Event	Qualification		Final	
Athlete	Event	Points	Rank	Points	Rank
Esmari van Reenen	50 m rifle 3 positions	578	16	Did not advance	
Diane Swanton	Trap	57	17	Did not advance	

== Swimming ==
Men

Athlete	Event	Heat		Semifinal		Final	
Athlete	Event	Result	Rank	Result	Rank	Result	Rank
Jean Basson	200 m freestyle	1:46.31	2 Q	1:46.13	3 Q	1:45.97	4
Jean Basson	400 m freestyle	3:52.90	30	—N/a		Did not advance	
William Diering	200 m breaststroke	2:10.39 AF	8 Q	2:10.21	12	Did not advance	
George du Rand	100 m backstroke	54.90	22	Did not advance			
George du Rand	200 m backstroke	1:58.62 AF	13 Q	1:58.61 AF	13	Did not advance	
Lyndon Ferns	100 m freestyle	48.26	9 Q	48.00	7 Q	48.04	6
Lyndon Ferns	100 m butterfly	52.04	15 Q	52.18	14	Did not advance	
Chad Ho	10 km open water	—N/a				1:52:13.1	9
Gideon Louw	50 m freestyle	22.17	16 Q	21.97	12	Did not advance	
Ryk Neethling	100 m freestyle	49.28	30	Did not advance			
Hercules Troyden Prinsloo	1500 m freestyle	15:12.64	22	—N/a		Did not advance	
Riaan Schoeman	400 m individual medley	4:14.09	12	—N/a		Did not advance	
Roland Mark Schoeman	50 m freestyle	21.76	5 Q	21.74	5 Q	21.67 AF	7
Darian Townsend	200 m freestyle	1:48.08	21	Did not advance			
Darian Townsend	200 m individual medley	1:59.22	10 Q	1:59.65	11	Did not advance	
Cameron van der Burgh	100 m breaststroke	59.96 AF	5 Q	1:00.57	10	Did not advance	
Neil Versfeld	200 m breaststroke	2:10.50	9 Q	2:10.06 AF	9	Did not advance	
Gerhard Zandberg	100 m backstroke	53.75 AF	5 Q	53.98	10	Did not advance	
Lyndon Ferns; Ryk Neethling; Roland Schoeman; Darian Townsend	4 × 100 m freestyle relay	3:13.06 AF	6 Q	—N/a		3:12.66 AF	7
Jean Basson; Sebastien Rousseau; Darian Townsend; Jan Venter	4 × 200 m freestyle relay	7:10.91 AF	8 Q	—N/a		7:13.02	8
Lyndon Ferns; Darian Townsend; Cameron van der Burgh; Gerhard Zandberg	4 × 100 m medley relay	3:34.16 AF	7 Q	—N/a		3:33.70 AF	7

Women

Natalie du Toit, five time gold medallist at the Athens Paralympics in 2004, has qualified to compete, becoming the first amputee ever to qualify for the Olympic Games in the 10 kilometre open water race. She finished in 16th place.

Athlete	Event	Heat		Semifinal		Final	
Athlete	Event	Result	Rank	Result	Rank	Result	Rank
Melissa Corfe	200 m freestyle	2:00.95	33	Did not advance			
Melissa Corfe	400 m freestyle	4:10.54	17	—N/a		Did not advance	
Melissa Corfe	200 m backstroke	2:12.64	22	Did not advance			
Natalie du Toit	10 km open water	—N/a				2:00:49.9	16
Mandy Loots	100 m butterfly	58.61 AF	18	Did not advance			
Kathryn Meaklim	200 m butterfly	2:09.41	16 Q	2:11.74	16	Did not advance	
Kathryn Meaklim	400 m individual medley	4:37.11	10	—N/a		Did not advance	
Jessica Pengelly	200 m individual medley	2:15.80	26	Did not advance			
Jessica Pengelly	400 m individual medley	4:41.04	21	—N/a		Did not advance	
Lize-Mari Retief	50 m freestyle	25.44	26	Did not advance			
Lize-Mari Retief	100 m freestyle	55.17	21	Did not advance			
Lize-Mari Retief	100 m butterfly	58.20 AF	8 Q	58.63	12	Did not advance	
Wendy Trott	400 m freestyle	4:08.38 AF	12	—N/a		Did not advance	
Wendy Trott	800 m freestyle	8:26.21 AF	9	—N/a		Did not advance	
Suzaan van Biljon	100 m breaststroke	1:07.55	5 Q	1:09.56	16	Did not advance	
Suzaan van Biljon	200 m breaststroke	2:25.51	9 Q	2:28.45	15	Did not advance	
Melissa Corfe; Mandy Loots; Kathryn Meaklim; Wendy Trott	4 × 100 m freestyle relay	3:51.14	15	—N/a		Did not advance	
Melissa Corfe; Mandy Loots; Lize-Mari Retief; Suzaan van Biljon	4 × 100 m medley relay	4:04.20	12	—N/a		Did not advance	

== Tennis ==
Athlete	Event	Round of 64	Round of 32	Round of 16	Quarterfinals	Semifinals	Final / BM	
Athlete	Event	Opposition Score	Opposition Score	Opposition Score	Opposition Score	Opposition Score	Opposition Score	Rank
Kevin Anderson	Men's singles	Loglo (TOG); W 6–3, 6–2	Kiefer (GER); L 4–6, 7–6^{(7–4)}, 4–6	Did not advance				
Kevin Anderson; Jeff Coetzee	Men's doubles	—N/a	Almagro / Ferrer (ESP); L 6–3, 3–6, 4–6	Did not advance				

== Triathlon ==
Athlete	Event	Swim (1.5 km)	Trans 1	Bike (40 km)	Trans 2	Run (10 km)	Total Time	Rank
Mari Rabie	Women's	19:54	0:29	1:06:30	0:34	42:01	2:09:28.02	43
Kate Roberts	Women's	19:58	0:30	1:06:26	0:37	38:02	2:05:33.24	32

== Volleyball ==
=== Beach ===
Athlete	Event	Preliminary round	Standing	Round of 16	Quarterfinals	Semifinals	Final / BM	
Athlete	Event	Opposition Score	Standing	Opposition Score	Opposition Score	Opposition Score	Opposition Score	Rank
Judith Augoustides; Vita Nel	Women's	Pool D Goller – Ludwig (GER); L 0 – 2 (12–21, 14–21); Koutroumanidou – Tsiartsiani (GRE); L 0 – 2 (12–21, 8–21); Chen X – Zhang X (CHN); L 0 – 2 (13–21, 9–21)	4	Did not advance				

== Weightlifting ==
Athlete	Event	Snatch		Clean & Jerk		Total	Rank
Athlete	Event	Result	Rank	Result	Rank	Total	Rank
Darryn Anthony	Men's −77 kg	135	24	160	22	295	22

== Wrestling ==
Key:

- VT - Victory by Fall.
- PP - Decision by Points - the loser with technical points.
- PO - Decision by Points - the loser without technical points.

Men's freestyle

Athlete	Event	Qualification	Round of 16	Quarterfinal	Semifinal	Repechage 1	Repechage 2	Final / BM	
Athlete	Event	Opposition Result	Opposition Result	Opposition Result	Opposition Result	Opposition Result	Opposition Result	Opposition Result	Rank
Heinrich Barnes	−66 kg	Buyanjav (MGL); L 1–3 ^{PP}	Did not advance						19
