= Rebecca Ward =

American fencer

Personal information
- Born: February 7, 1990 (age 36) Grand Junction, Colorado, U.S.
Medal record
Women's fencing
Representing the United States
Olympic Games
Bronze medal – third place	2008 Beijing	Individual sabre
Bronze medal – third place	2008 Beijing	Team sabre
World Championships
Gold medal – first place	2006 Turin	Individual sabre
Silver medal – second place	2006 Turin	Team sabre

Rebecca Ward (born February 7, 1990) is an American sabre fencer. She won the gold medal at the sabre 2006 World Fencing Championships after beating Mariel Zagunis 15–11 in the final, and took bronze in both individual and team sabre events at the 2008 Beijing Olympics. She also won the women's NCAA national individual sabre championship three times (2009, 2011, 2012), the first in history to do so in sabre. In 2015, she was inducted into the USA Fencing Hall of Fame.

== Personal ==
Ward was born in Grand Junction, Colorado, to Bill and Beth Ward. She has a brother by the name of Wiliam Ward. Ward was home schooled. She was the senior director at the Clean Energy Leadership Institute until April 2021, and is currently the head of the Saber Program Director for the Arlington Fencers' Club in Arlington, Virginia. She has lived in Cedar Mill, a suburb of Portland, Oregon.

== History ==
A member of the Oregon Fencing Alliance (OFA), she trained with Ed Korfanty Charles Randall and Jacek Huchwajda and has won a record number of world titles for a female sabre fencer in 2006; Cadet (U17), Junior (U20), Junior Team and Senior. As of June 2007, Ward was ranked first in the world in both Official and World Cup rankings for senior women sabre fencers. She was also a member of the US Senior World Team that won the gold medal at the 2005 World Fencing Championships in Leipzig, Germany.

As of July 2007, Ward was the number-one-ranked senior women's sabre fencer in the United States and on the FIE Rankings. Ward won the Grand Prix in Las Vegas and gave up only 30 points of a possible 90 (an average of only five points in each 15-point bout).

== College career ==
Ward fenced for Duke University under Maître Alex Beguinet while working towards majors in Public Policy and Psychology, as well as a Certificate in Energy and the Environment. On Sunday March 22, 2009, she won the women's NCAA national individual sabre title. She failed to defend her title in 2010, losing the final match to Caroline Vloka of Harvard. On March 27, 2011, Ward defeated Vloka in the women's sabre NCAA semifinal, and went on to reclaim her title by defeating Princeton's Eliza Stone 15–12 in the gold-medal match. In 2012, she captured her third NCAA championship by defeating Penn State's Monica Aksamit, becoming the first three-time individual sabre winner in NCAA history.

Ward graduated Duke with a 272–7 (.975) record, making her the school's all-time wins leader.

== 2008 Beijing Olympics ==
Ward was one of the top seeds for the individual sabre competition. She won her first bout, against Spain's Araceli Navarro, when her opponent was forced to withdraw due to a shoulder injury (Ward was winning 12–7 at the time). She then defeated Orsolya Nagy of Hungary in the round of 16, 15–5. In the quarterfinals, she beat Tunisia's Azza Besbes, 15–14, in a match decided by one final touch.

In the semifinals, Ward faced defending Olympic champion Mariel Zagunis, with whom she trained regularly at the Oregon Fencing Alliance. She lost the bout 15–11 to Zagunis, who would go on to win the gold medal. Shortly after, Ward fenced in the bronze medal bout, where she defeated Russia's Sofia Velikaya 15–14. This assured that American fencers would sweep all three medals prior to the actual final bout, in which Sada Jacobson faced Mariel Zagunis for the gold.

In the women's sabre team event, the US was heavily favored to win the team event. Ward teamed up with Jacobson and Zagunis to defeat the South African team in the quarterfinals, 45–8.

In the semifinals, they fenced Ukraine. The Ukrainians, seeded fifth in the tournament, defeated the favored US team 45–39, denying them a gold medal, and placing them in the bronze medal bout against France.

The USA team rebounded from their semifinal loss by defeating the French team 45–38, with Ward making the final touch of the bout, and Ward earned her second bronze medal of the Olympics.

== See also ==
- List of USFA Division I National Champions
- List of NCAA fencing champions
- List of USFA Hall of Fame members
