= Carole Vergne =

French fencer

Personal information
- Born: 7 August 1985 (age 40) Saint-Malo, Ille-et-Vilaine, France
- Height: 1.69 m (5 ft 6 1/2 in)
- Weight: 55 kg (121 lb)

Sport
- Sport: Fencing
- Event: Sabre
- Club: Lagardère Paris Racing
- Coached by: Pierre Guichot (national); Morgan Fraboulet (personal)
Medal record
Women's fencing
Representing France
World Championships
Gold medal – first place	2007 Saint Petersburg	Team sabre
Silver medal – second place	2009 Antalya	Team sabre
Bronze medal – third place	2009 Antalya	Sabre
Bronze medal – third place	2010 Paris	Team sabre

Carole Vergne (born August 7, 1985, in Saint-Malo, Ille-et-Vilaine) is a French sabre fencer. She won two medals, silver and bronze, in the same weapon at the 2009 World Fencing Championships in Antalya, Turkey.

Vergne represented France at the 2008 Summer Olympics in Beijing, where she competed in two sabre events. For her first event, the women's individual sabre, Vergne received a bye for the preliminary round of thirty-two, before losing out to South Korea's Kim Keum-Hwa, with a sudden death score of 14–15. Few days later, she joined with her fellow fencers and teammates Solenn Mary, Léonore Perrus, and Anne-Lise Touya for the women's team sabre. Vergne and her team, however, lost the bronze medal match to the U.S. team (led by Mariel Zagunis), with a total score of 38 touches.
