= Arkady Burdan =

American fencing coach of Soviet descent

- Born: April 7, 1944 (age 80)
- Occupation(s): Fencing coach, Nellya Fencers
- Known for: Founding Nellya Fencers
- Awards: Olympic Coach

Maestro Arkady Burdan (born April 7, 1944) is a USSR-born American fencing coach of Soviet descent. He is a former two-time Olympic Fencing Coach for the United States (Athens 2004, Beijing 2008). Maestro Burdan was the United States Fencing Association's Elite Coach of the Year (2002), and was inducted into the US Fencing Hall of Fame in 2009.

He is also the founder of the Arkady Burdan Foundation, a non-profit centered on enriching the physical, academic, and character development of children in need through the sport of fencing.

Arkady Burdan is a founder of Nellya Fencers, a fencing club in Atlanta, Georgia. He has trained many fencers, including US National Champions at every age group and competitive level, Junior Olympic Champions, NCAA Champions, Junior and Senior Pan American Champions, Junior and Senior World Champions, and three Olympians. He is the coach of three-time Olympic Medalist, Sada Jacobson. His early distinctions include being named USSR Master of Sports and Honored Coach of the Ukrainian Republic. He was the principal fencing coach of the Ukrainian Olympic Training Center. His students have earned more than 40 gold medals in Soviet National Championships and in international competitions.

Maestro Burdan's college-bound fencers have been recruited for varsity teams such as Columbia, Ohio State, Penn State, St. John's, University of Pennsylvania, Stanford, Harvard, and Yale.

== See also ==
- List of USFA Hall of Fame members
