= Jyoti Chetty =

South African sabre fencer

Personal information
- Nationality: South Africa
- Born: 26 January 1982 (age 44) Pretoria, South Africa
- Height: 1.57 m (5 ft 2 in)
- Weight: 57 kg (126 lb)

Sport
- Sport: Fencing
- Event: Sabre
- Club: Tyshler Fencing School

Jyoti Chetty (born January 26, 1982, in Pretoria) is a South African sabre fencer. Chetty represented South Africa at the 2008 Summer Olympics in Beijing, where she competed in two sabre events.

For her first event, the women's individual sabre, Chetty lost the first preliminary match to Tunisia's Azza Besbes, with a score of 2–15. Few days later, she joined with her fellow fencers and teammates Shelley Gosher, Elvira Wood and Adele du Plooy, for the women's team sabre. Chetty and her team, however, lost the seventh place match to the Canadian team (led by Sandra Sassine), with a total score of 16 touches.
