= Adele du Plooy =

South African fencer

Personal information
- Nationality: South Africa
- Born: 11 October 1980 (age 45) Johannesburg, South Africa
- Height: 1.68 m (5 ft 6 in)
- Weight: 68 kg (150 lb)

Sport
- Sport: Fencing
- Event: Sabre
- Club: Tyshler Fencing School

Adele du Plooy (born 11 October 1980) is a South African sabre fencer. Du Plooy represented South Africa at the 2008 Summer Olympics in Beijing, where she competed in two sabre events.

For her first event, the women's individual sabre, du Plooy lost the first preliminary match to Ukraine's Halyna Pundyk, with a score of 7–15. Few days later, she joined with her fellow fencers and teammates Shelley Gosher, Elvira Wood and Jyoti Chetty, for the women's team sabre. Du Plooy and her team, however, lost the seventh place match to the Canadian team (led by Sandra Sassine), with a total score of 16 touches.
