= Siobhan Byrne =

German-born Irish sabre fencer (born 1984)

Personal information
- Full name: Siobhan Claire Byrne
- Nationality: Ireland
- Born: 13 August 1984 (age 41) Ostfildern, Baden-Württemberg, West Germany
- Height: 1.74 m (5 ft 8 1/2 in)
- Weight: 69 kg (152 lb)

Sport
- Sport: Fencing
- Event: Sabre
- College team: Ohio State Buckeyes (USA)

Siobhan Claire Byrne (born August 13, 1984) is a German-born Irish sabre fencer. She is a four-time All-American (2005–2008), a three-time Academic All-Big Ten honoree, and a two-time medalist at the Junior World Cup Fencing Series. She also won a bronze medal for her category at the 2007 Junior European Championships in Conegliano, Italy, and was ranked as the no. 1 Irish fencer.

Byrne represented Ireland at the 2008 Summer Olympics where she competed in the women's individual sabre event. She lost the first preliminary round match to Poland's Irena Więckowska, with a score of 8–15.

Byrne was also a member of the Ohio State Buckeyes fencing team (under coach Vladimir Nazlymov), and a summa cum laude graduate, with a degree in health information management and systems, at Ohio State University in Columbus, Ohio.
