= Mariel Zagunis =

American fencer (born 1985)

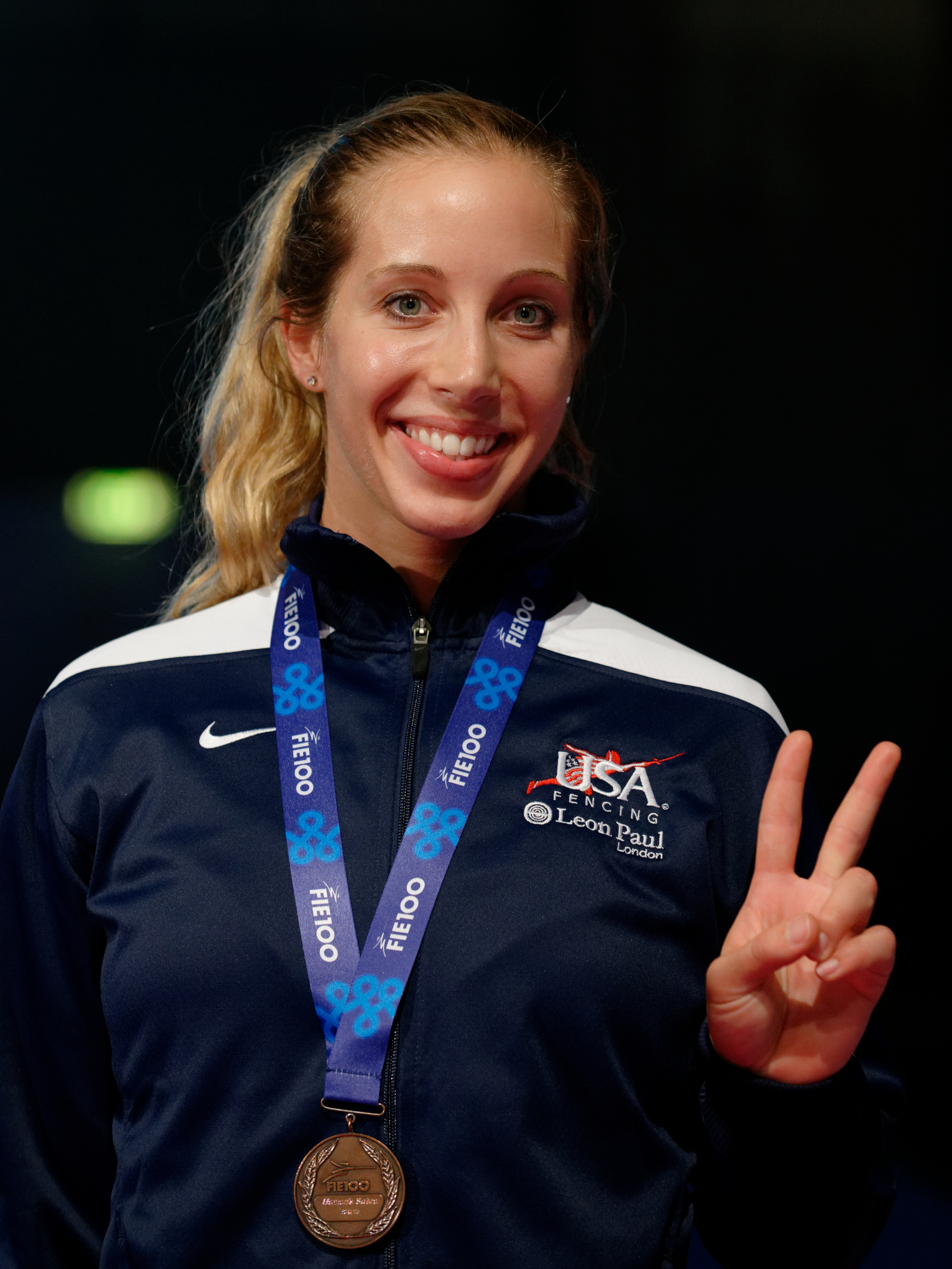

Personal information
- Full name: Mariel Leigh Zagunis
- Born: March 3, 1985 (age 41) Portland, Oregon, United States
- Height: 5 ft 8 in (173 cm)
- Weight: 160 lb (73 kg)

Fencing career
- Sport: Fencing
- Country: United States
- Weapon: Sabre
- Hand: Left
- Years on national team: 2000–present
- Club: Oregon Fencing Alliance
- Head coach: Ed Korfanty
- FIE ranking: Current ranking
Medal record
Women's fencing
Representing the United States
Olympic Games
Gold medal – first place	2004 Athens	Individual
Gold medal – first place	2008 Beijing	Individual
Bronze medal – third place	2008 Beijing	Team
Bronze medal – third place	2016 Rio de Janeiro	Team
World Championships
Gold medal – first place	2005 Leipzig	Team
Gold medal – first place	2009 Antalya	Individual
Gold medal – first place	2010 Paris	Individual
Gold medal – first place	2014 Kazan	Team
Silver medal – second place	2004 New York	Team
Silver medal – second place	2006 Turin	Individual
Silver medal – second place	2006 Turin	Team
Silver medal – second place	2011 Catania	Individual
Silver medal – second place	2014 Kazan	Individual
Bronze medal – third place	2011 Catania	Team
Bronze medal – third place	2012 Kyiv	Team
Bronze medal – third place	2013 Budapest	Team
Bronze medal – third place	2015 Moscow	Team

Mariel Leigh Zagunis (born March 3, 1985) is an American sabre fencer. She is a two-time Olympic champion in the individual sabre (2004 and 2008) and the first American woman to win a gold medal in fencing at the Olympics (which happened in 2004). She was Team USA flag bearer in the 2012 Summer Olympics Parade of Nations. She has two Olympic bronze team medals (in 2008 and 2016) and is a five-time Olympian (2004, 2008, 2012, 2016 and 2020).

== Biography ==
Zagunis' parents, Robert and Cathy (née Menges) Zagunis, were collegiate rowers at Oregon State University and Connecticut College, respectively. They both competed with the U.S. rowing team at the 1976 Summer Olympics in Montreal. Her older brother Marten and younger brother Merrick also fence sabre. She grew up in Oregon and attended Valley Catholic from kindergarten to 12th grade, and the University of Notre Dame where she majored in anthropology.

Zagunis is of Lithuanian descent on her paternal side and was raised in the Catholic faith.

== Early career ==
Zagunis was the first American fencer to hold the Jr. World Cup Champion title (2002), and she did so three years in a row (2002, 2003, 2004). She is the youngest fencer ever to win the Fédération Internationale d'Escrime (FIE) World Championship gold, and the youngest fencer to win three FIE medals in one season. Zagunis won the FIE over-all medal three years in a row. She was the first fencer in the history of the sport to hold more than two World Champion titles in one season (2001: Cadet Jr. and Jr. Team titles). She entered the University of Notre Dame in 2004 on an athletic scholarship.

In October 2005, Zagunis won her seventh World Champion title at the Leipzig, Germany World Championships, in the women's team event. A year later at the 2006 World Fencing Championships she won the silver, after losing the final to Rebecca Ward. She is the second U.S. fencer in history to have won the World Cup total-points Title from the FIE.

In 2009 Zagunis captured the last individual World title to have eluded her when she won the World Championships in Antalya, Turkey, defeating Ukrainian Olga Kharlan 15–6 in the final. She repeated as World Champion one year later, again winning the individual sabre title, defeating the Ukraine's Olga Khomrova 15–11 in the final.

== 2004 Athens Olympics ==
The Women's Sabre event was being contested for the first time at the 2004 Summer Olympics. Zagunis did not directly qualify to fence in the tournament. However, Nigeria decided not to send their qualifying fencer to the tournament, and as the next highest seeded fencer in the world, Zagunis was selected to represent the United States at the 2004 Summer Olympics.

She received one of eight byes offered in the first round, entering the tournament in the Round of 16, where she defeated Japanese fencer Madoka Hisagae, 15–13. In the quarterfinals, she defeated Elena Jemayeva of Azerbaijan, 15–11. In the semifinals, Zagunis clinched at least a silver medal by defeating Romania's Cătălina Gheorghițoaia, 15–10.

Zagunis faced Chinese fencer Xue Tan in the finals, defeating her 15–9 and becoming the first American to win an Olympic fencing gold medal in 100 years. Previously the only American Olympic fencing gold medalist was Albertson Van Zo Post. In the 1904 Summer Olympics he had been the gold medalist in the individual singlestick event and in the team foil event, where he had joined two Cuban fencers to make up a combined Cuba/U.S. team.

Because fellow American Sada Jacobson had become the first U.S. woman to be ranked #1 in the world in women's sabre (in 2003), she was considered a favorite. Zagunis' win as the underdog surprised the elite in the fencing world. (Jacobson earned the bronze medal at the 2004 Olympics.)

== 2008 Beijing Olympics ==
=== Individual event ===
Zagunis entered the 2008 Summer Olympics seeded sixth. She received a bye in the first round, entering the tournament when there were 32 fencers remaining. She trailed at the break in her round of 32 match against Sandra Sassine 8–7, but scored eight of the last ten touches to win 15–10. She then defeated Bogna Jozwiak 15–13 in the Round of 16.

She beat Bao Yingying in the quarterfinals, 15–9. Zagunis then faced her training partner from the Oregon Fencing Alliance, Rebecca Ward, in the semifinals and defeated her 15–11.

In the gold medal match, Zagunis faced the other top seed in the tournament, Sada Jacobson, and won, 15–8. With Ward's victory in the bronze medal match, American fencers had won all three medals in the individual event for the first time in history.

=== Team event ===
In the women's sabre team event, the U.S. was heavily favored to win. Zagunis teamed up with Jacobson and Ward to defeat the South African team in the quarterfinals, 45–8.

In the semifinals, they fenced the team from Ukraine. The Ukrainian side, seeded fifth in the tournament, defeated the U.S. team 45–39, denying them a gold medal, and placing them in the bronze medal bout against France. The U.S. team rebounded from their semifinal loss by defeating the French team 45–38 for the bronze medal.

== 2012 London Olympics ==
On July 25, 2012, Zagunis was elected by Team USA to be the national flag bearer in the Summer Olympics Parade of Nations.

Zagunis failed to win a medal at these games. She lost to South Korea's Kim Ji-yeon, 15–13; then lost to Ukraine's Olga Kharlan in the bronze medal match, 15–10.

== 2020 Tokyo Olympics (in 2021) ==
She was one of three female saber fencers to represent the United States in fencing at the 2020 Olympics in Tokyo in 2021. Zagunis entered the 2021 Summer Olympics seeded tenth. She jumped out to a 7 to 0 lead in her round of 32 match against Canadian Gabriella Page (seeded 23) and scored the last five touches to win 15–3. She then defeated Korea's Ji-yeon Kim (seeded 7) 15–12 in the Round of 16. In her quarterfinal match, she fell to two-time champion Sofya Velikaya (seeded 1) of the Russian Olympic Committee, 15–8, as the Russian reeled off 7 straight points to advance to the semifinals.

== Outside the fencing arena ==
On March 3, 2017, Zagunis was announced as one of 16 celebrities participating in a cooking competition on the Food Network TV series Chopped. She was featured in the "Star Power: Culinary Muscle" episode, alongside former NFL player LaMarr Woodley, former gold medalist figure skater Dorothy Hamill, and current female UFC fighter Paige VanZant. Zagunis was the second contestant eliminated from the competition in her heat.

== See also ==
- List of USFA Division I National Champions
- List of NCAA fencing champions

Olympic Games
Preceded by Mark Grimmette	Flagbearer for United States; London 2012	Succeeded by Todd Lodwick
