= Elvira Wood (fencer) =

South African fencer

Personal information
- Nationality: South Africa
- Born: 21 September 1973 (age 52) Pongola, KwaZulu-Natal, South Africa
- Height: 1.62 m (5 ft 4 in)
- Weight: 60 kg (132 lb)

Sport
- Sport: Fencing
- Event: Sabre
- Club: IKSAFA Fencing Club

Elvira Wood (born 21 September 1973 in Pongola, KwaZulu-Natal) is a South African sabre fencer. At age thirty-four, Wood made her official debut for the 2008 Summer Olympics in Beijing, where she competed in two sabre events. She is also the wife of Mike Wood, who qualified for the men's épée at these Olympic games.

For her first event, the women's individual sabre, Wood lost the first preliminary match to Canada's Sandra Sassine, with a score of 2–15. Few days later, she joined with her fellow fencers and teammates Shelley Gosher, Jyoti Chetty and Adele du Plooy, for the women's team sabre. Wood and her team, however, lost the seventh place match to the Canadian team (led by Sassine), with a total score of 16 touches.
