= Mihaela Bulică =

Romanian fencer

Personal information
- Born: 10 February 1990 (age 36) Slobozia, Romania
- Height: 1.64 m (5 ft 5 in)
- Weight: 60 kg (130 lb)

Fencing career
- Sport: Fencing
- Weapon: sabre
- Hand: left-handed
- National coach: Alexandru Chiculița
- Club: CSA Steaua București
- FIE ranking: current ranking

Mihaela Bulică (born 10 February 1990) is a Romanian sabre fencer.

== Career ==
Bulică took up fencing when she was eight under the coaching of Marin Mihăiță at CSS Slobozia. She won the bronze medal at the 2008 U23 European Championships in Monza, then a silver medal at the 2009 Junior European Championships in Odense and another silver at the 2012 U23 European Championships in Bratislava.

She joined the senior national team in 2007. Their best result was a 10th place at the 2009 World Fencing Championships in Antalya. Bulică took part in the 2011 and the 2013 Summer Universiade, where she finished respectively 7th and 30th. She also won the Romanian national championship in 2012 and 2013.

Bulică graduated from the UNEFS Bucharest.
