= Julie Cloutier =

Canadian fencer (born 1986)

Personal information
- Born: April 24, 1986 (age 40) Montreal, Quebec, Canada
Medal record
Women's Fencing
Representing Canada
Pan American Games
Bronze medal – third place	2007 Rio de Janeiro	Team sabre

Julie Cloutier (born April 24, 1986) is a Canadian fencer. She competed in the individual and team sabre events at the 2008 Summer Olympics. She was a member of the Canadian team that finished in 7th place in the team sabre event. She was born in Montreal, Quebec.
