= Ni Hong (fencer) =

Chinese fencer (born 1986)

Personal information
- Born: 8 February 1986 (age 40) Beijing, China
Medal record
Women's Fencing
Olympic Games
Silver medal – second place	2008 Beijing	Team sabre
World Championships
Bronze medal – third place	2009 Antalya	Team Sabre

Ni Hong (simplified Chinese: 倪红; traditional Chinese: 倪紅; pinyin: Ní Hóng; born 8 February 1986 in Beijing) is a female Chinese sabre fencer, who competed at the 2008 Summer Olympics.

== Major performances ==
- 2008 World Cup Grand Prix Tianjin – 1st team

== See also ==
- China at the 2008 Summer Olympics
