= Olena Khomrova =

Ukrainian fencer (born 1987)

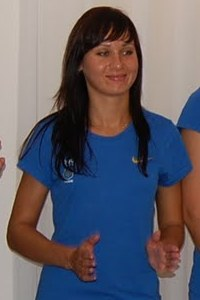

Personal information
- Born: May 16, 1987 (age 39) Mykolaiv, Ukrainian SSR, Soviet Union

Sport
- Club: Dynamo
Medal record
Women's fencing
Olympic Games
Gold medal – first place	2008 Beijing	Team sabre
World Championships
Gold medal – first place	2009 Antalya	Team sabre
Silver medal – second place	2007 St. Petersburg	Team sabre
Silver medal – second place	2010 Paris	Team sabre
Silver medal – second place	2011 Catania	Team sabre
Silver medal – second place	2012 Kyiv	Team sabre
Bronze medal – third place	2010 Paris	Individual sabre
European Championships
Gold medal – first place	Plovdiv 2009	Team sabre
Gold medal – first place	Leipzig 2010	Team sabre
Silver medal – second place	2007 Gand	Team sabre
Silver medal – second place	2008 Kyiv	Team sabre
Silver medal – second place	2011 Sheffield	Team sabre
Silver medal – second place	2012 Legnano	Team sabre
Bronze medal – third place	2005 Zalaegerszeg	Team sabre
Bronze medal – third place	2007 Gand	Sabre
Universiade
Silver medal – second place	2007 Bangkok	Team sabre
Silver medal – second place	2011 Shenzhen	Team sabre

Olena Khomrova (Ukrainian: Олена Хомрова; born May 16, 1987 in Mykolaiv) is a Ukrainian fencer and member of the team which won the gold medal in sabre at the 2008 Summer Olympics.

== Career ==
The Ukrainian team (she has stayed a member of) won gold in the Sabre final beating Russia during the 2009 and 2010 European Fencing Championships. At the 2009 World Fencing Championships Khomrova and her teammates beat France to win gold.

The team won the title "Team of the Year" at the (Ukrainian) "Heroes of Sports Year 2009" ceremony in April 2010.

== Personal life ==
Olena Khomrova is married to Sergiy Gladyr, a Ukrainian basketball player. They have a daughter.

On March 29, 2022, her father died during a Russian missile strike on the building of the Mykolaiv regional state administration, where he worked.
