= Sada Jacobson =

American fencer (born 1983)

Personal information
- Born: February 14, 1983 (age 43) Rochester, Minnesota, U.S.
- Height: 5 ft 7 in (170 cm)

Fencing career
- Sport: Fencing
- Weapon: sabre
- Hand: left-handed
- Club: Nellya Fencers
- Head coach: Arkady Burdan
- Retired: 2008
- FIE ranking: rankings (archive)
Medal record
Women's sabre
Representing United States
Olympic Games
| Silver medal – second place | 2008 Beijing | Individual sabre |
| Bronze medal – third place | 2004 Athens | Individual sabre |
| Bronze medal – third place | 2008 Beijing | Team sabre |
World Championships
| Gold medal – first place | 2000 Budapest | Team sabre |
| Gold medal – first place | 2005 Leipzig | Team sabre |
| Silver medal – second place | 2004 New York | Team sabre |
| Silver medal – second place | 2006 Turin | Team sabre |
| Bronze medal – third place | 2006 Turin | Individual sabre |
Pan American Games
| Gold medal – first place | 2003 Santo Domingo | Individual sabre |

Sada Molly Jacobson (born February 14, 1983) is an American Olympic fencer. She is the 2008 Olympic Individual Sabre silver medalist in women's sabre (one of three Olympic medals), the 2004 Olympic Individual Sabre bronze medalist in women's sabre, and the 2003 Pan American Games champion in women's sabre. In 2016, she was inducted into the United States Fencing Hall of Fame.

== Background ==
Jacobson was born in Rochester, Minnesota, and is Jewish. Her parents are David Jacobson, a member of the 1974 U.S. National fencing team in saber who was an All-American fencer at Yale University and now an endocrinologist, and Tina Jacobson, who also fenced competitively. She is the sister of fellow U.S. Olympic team fencer and Junior World Champion Emily Jacobson, and fencer Jackie Jacobson.

Jacobson swam competitively for two years in high school. She postponed her college career to train full-time for the 2004 Summer Olympics.

Her hometown is Dunwoody, Georgia, and she has lived in Atlanta, Georgia. She graduated from The Westminster Schools in Atlanta, Georgia, in 2000. She graduated with a history degree from Morse College, Yale University. She studied history at Yale University.

== Fencing career ==
She trained at Nellya Fencers from a young age. She has been coached by Arkady Burdan of Nellya Fencers, and Henry Hartunian at Yale.

=== College & Under-19 career ===
Jacobson was a 2-time NCAA sabre champion for Yale University (2001 and 2002). She won an NCAA Championship and earned 1st-team All-America honors as a freshman at Yale, after a 30–0 regular season. Jacobson was 29–1 as a sophomore, and repeated as NCAA champion. In addition, she was the 2001 Under-19 National Champion. In 2003, she won the World Junior Fencing Championships in women's saber.

=== Senior World Championships ===
Jacobson is a 4-time Senior World Championships team member (2000–03). She was a member of the gold-medal 2000 Women's Sabre World Championship team at the age of 17. She won another bronze medal at the 2006 World Fencing Championships sabre competition.

In her first individual World Championships in 2001, Jacobson placed 12th. She placed 5th in 2002 and 2003.

=== Pan American Games ===
Jacobson won the gold medal in sabre at the 2003 Pan American Games.

=== National Championships ===
Jacobson won the US women's sabre championship in 2004 (beating her sister in the final) and 2006.

She was ranked # 1 in the US from June 2003 through October 2005.

=== Number 1 World Ranking ===
In 2004, at 19 years of age she became the first U.S. woman to be ranked No. 1 in the world in sabre, and only the second U.S. athlete to claim the title, after male fencer Keeth Smart.

=== Olympic medals ===
Jacobson won the bronze medal in women's sabre at the 2004 Summer Olympics, the first year that event was hosted at the Olympics. Her match took place before the gold-silver match, and therefore Jacobson became the first women's sabre Olympic medalist. She won the silver medal in individual sabre and bronze in the team sabre event at the 2008 Summer Olympics.

== Post-fencing career ==
Jacobson indicated that she intended to retire from competitive fencing after the 2008 Olympic competitions concluded, and focus on law school, and starting life with her fiancé. She graduated with a J.D. degree from the University of Michigan Law School in 2011. She and Brendan Brunelle Bâby, who graduated from Pennsylvania State University where he competed in épée and was a member of three NCAA championship teams, were married in May 2009 in Atlanta at the Nellya Fencers Club, where she had trained for both the 2004 and 2008 Summer Olympics. As of 2015, she practiced commercial litigation for McKenna Long & Aldridge.

== Awards ==
- Jacobson, who is Jewish, received the Marty Glickman Award for the Outstanding Jewish Scholastic Athlete of the Year in both 2002 and 2005.
- She was named Academic All-Ivy League for 2002.
- In 2003 Jacobson was named the U.S. Fencer of the Year.
- Also in 2003, she was inducted in the U.S. National Jewish Sports Hall of Fame, which recognizes outstanding Jewish athletes.
- In 2012, she was inducted into the International Jewish Sports Hall of Fame.
- In 2016, she was inducted into the United States Fencing Hall of Fame.

== See also ==
- List of select Jewish fencers
- List of Jewish Olympic medalists
- List of NCAA fencing champions
- List of USFA Division I National Champions
- List of USFA Hall of Fame members
