= Bogna Jóźwiak =

Polish sabre fencer (born 1983)

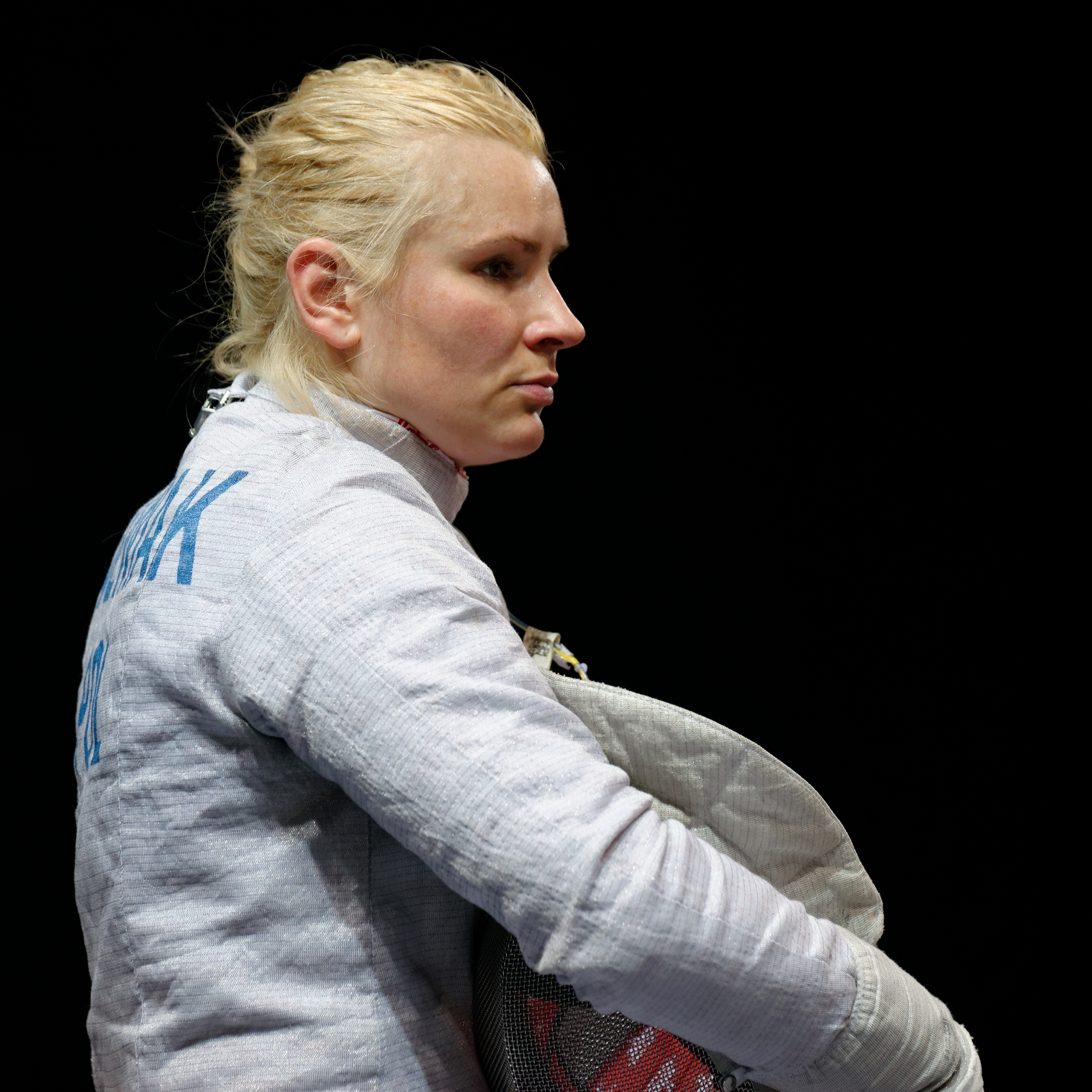
- At the 2014 European Fencing Championships

Personal information
- Nationality: Poland
- Born: 25 April 1983 (age 43) Poznań, Poland
- Height: 1.81 m (5 ft 11 in)
- Weight: 80 kg (176 lb)

Fencing career
- Sport: Fencing
- Country: Poland
- Weapon: sabre
- Hand: Right-handed
- Club: AZS Poznań
- Personal coach: Norbert Jaskot
- FIE ranking: current ranking
Medal record
Military World Games
Bronze medal – third place	2019 Wuhan	Team

Bogna Jóźwiak (born 15 April 1983 in Poznań) is a Polish sabre fencer. Jozwiak represented Poland at the 2008 Summer Olympics in Beijing, where she competed in two sabre events.

For her first event, the women's individual sabre, Jozwiak first defeated Venezuela's Alejandra Benítez in the preliminary round of thirty-two, before losing out her next match to U.S. fencer Mariel Zagunis, with a score of 13–15. Few days later, she joined with her fellow fencers and teammates Irena Więckowska and Aleksandra Socha for the women's team sabre. Jozwiak and her team, however, lost the fifth place match to the Russian team (led by Sofiya Velikaya), with a total score of 36 touches.
