= Olya Ovtchinnikova =

Canadian fencer (born 1987)

Olya Ovtchinnikova OLY
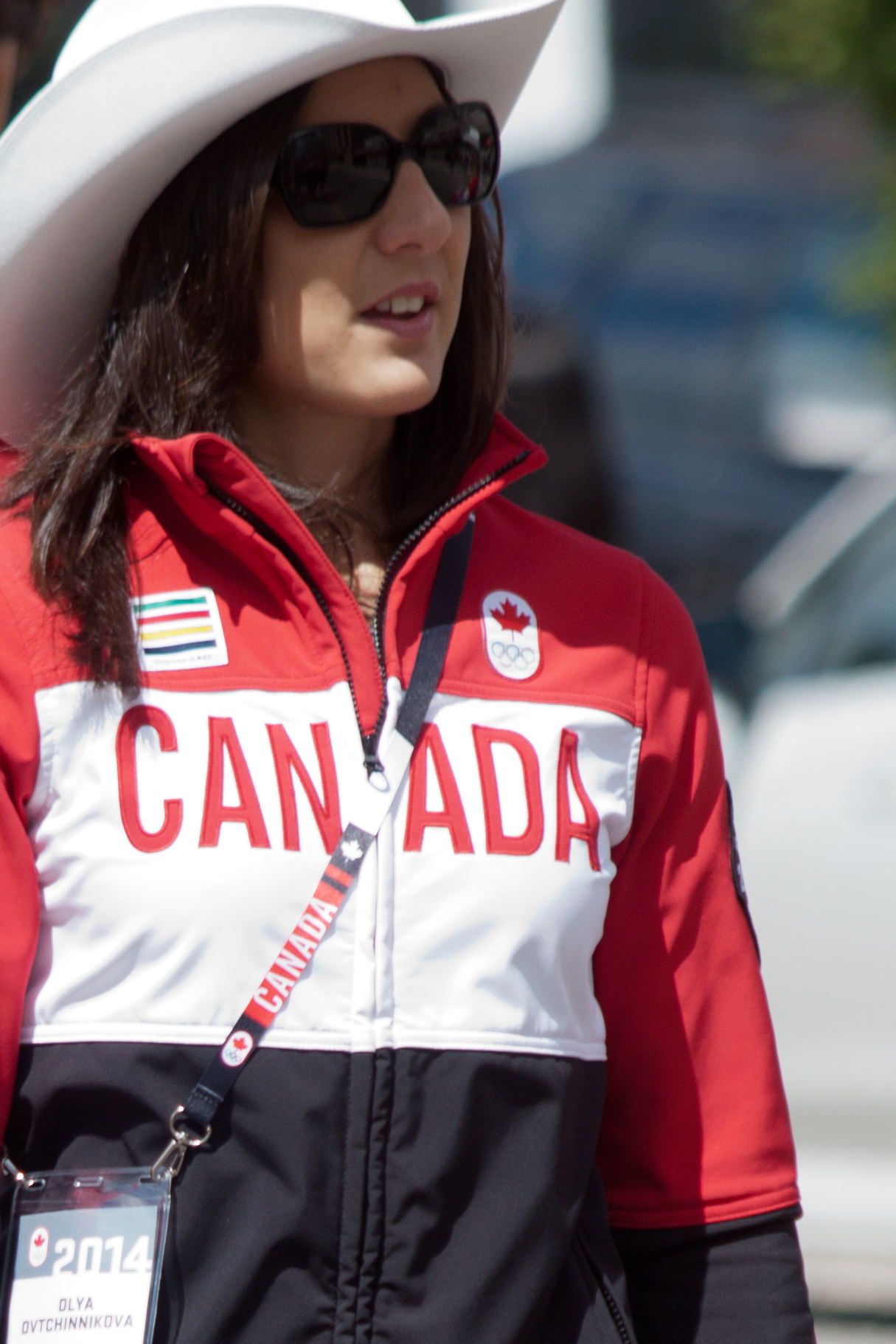
- Ovtchinnikova in Calgary (2014)

Personal information
- Born: February 6, 1987 (age 39)
Medal record
Women's Fencing
Representing Canada
Pan American Games
Bronze medal – third place	2007 Rio de Janeiro	Team sabre

Olya Ovtchinnikova (born February 6, 1987) is a Canadian fencer. Ovtchinnikova started fencing for recreation in Moscow, Russia, where she participated in local competitions. In 2000, her family moved to Toronto, Ontario, Canada, where she began to train more seriously. She speaks both Russian and English.

She competed in the individual and team sabre events at the 2008 Summer Olympics, but did not win a medal. She was a member of the Canadian team that finished in seventh place.
