= Irena Więckowska =

Polish fencer (born 1982)

Personal information
- Nationality: Poland
- Born: 17 February 1982 (age 44) Gdańsk, Poland
- Height: 1.60 m (5 ft 3 in)
- Weight: 54 kg (119 lb)

Sport
- Sport: Fencing
- Event: Sabre
- Club: AZS Warszawa

Irena Więckowska (born 17 February 1982 in Gdańsk) is a Polish sabre fencer. Wieckowska represented Poland at the 2008 Summer Olympics in Beijing, where she competed in two sabre events.

For her first event, the women's individual sabre, Wieckowska defeated Ireland's Siobhan Byrne and Russia's Elena Nechaeva in the preliminaries, before losing out the preliminary round of sixteen to Chinese fencer Bao Yingying, with a score of 6–15. A few days later, she joined with her fellow fencers and teammates Bogna Jóźwiak and Aleksandra Socha for the women's team sabre. Wieckowska and her team, however, lost the fifth place match to the Russian team (led by Sofiya Velikaya), with a total score of 36 touches.
