= Orsolya Nagy =

Hungarian fencer (born 1977)

Personal information
- Nationality: Hungarian
- Born: 17 November 1977 (age 48) Budapest, Hungary
- Height: 1.62 m (5 ft 4 in)

Sport
- Sport: Fencing

Orsolya Nagy (Hungarian pronunciation: [ˈnɒɟ ˈorʃojɒ], born 17 November 1977) is a Hungarian fencer who competed in the women's individual sabre events at the 2004 and 2008 Summer Olympics. She won a bronze medal in the individual sabre event at the 2009 World Fencing Championships.
