= Léonore Perrus =

French fencer (born 1984)

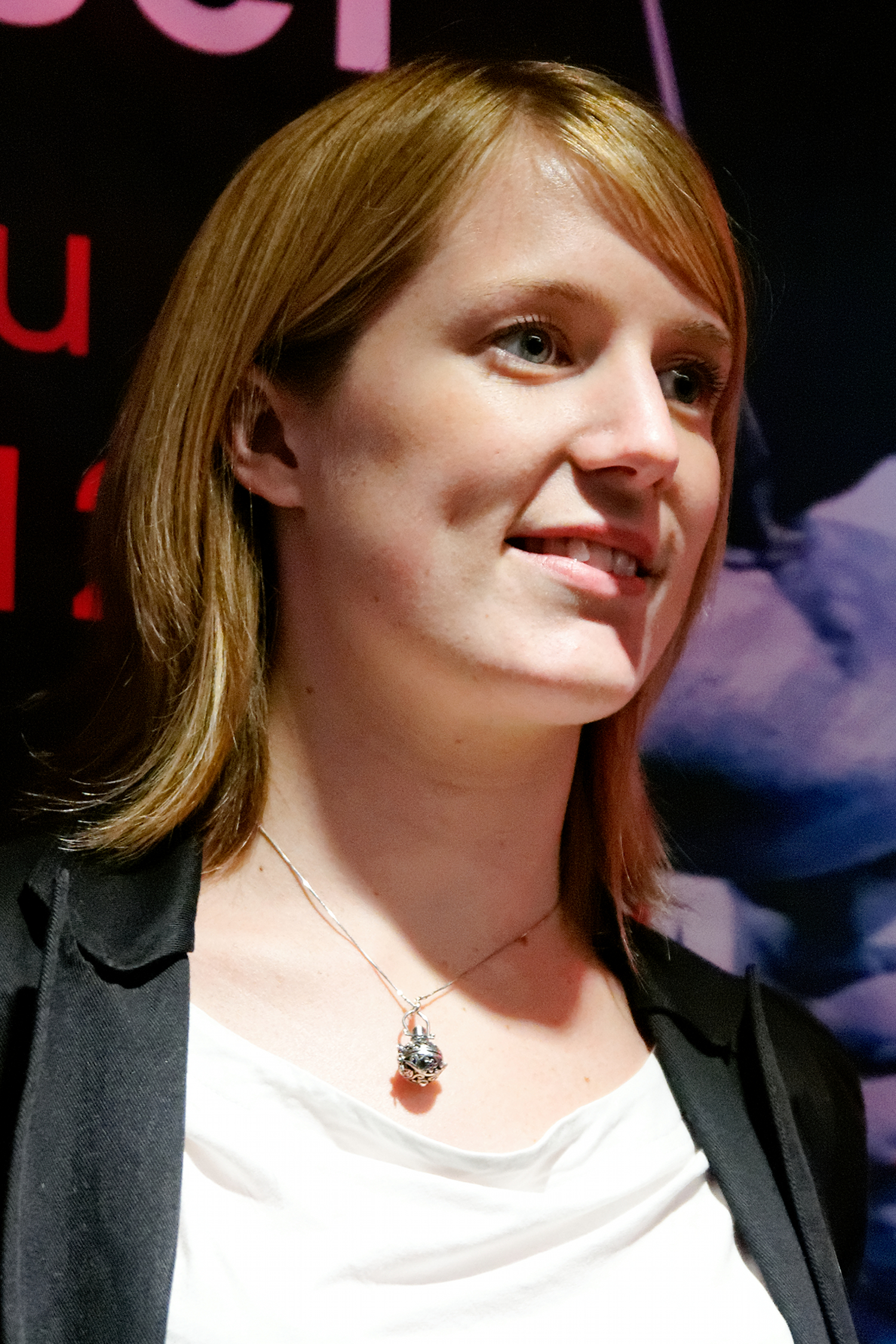
- Perrus in 2012

Personal information
- Full name: Léonore Simone Yvonne Perrus
- Born: 22 April 1984 (age 42) Paris, France

Sport
- Sport: Fencing

Léonore Simone Yvonne Perrus (born 22 April 1984) is a French fencer. She competed in the sabre events at the 2004, 2008 and 2012 Summer Olympics.

== Honours ==
Orders

- Knight of the National Order of Merit: 2014
