= Sandra Sassine =

Canadian fencer (born 1979)

Sandra Sassine OLY
Personal information
- Nationality: Canadian
- Born: 28 September 1979 (age 46) Chibougamau, Quebec
- Height: 5 ft 7 in (1.70 m)
- Weight: 123 lb (56 kg)

Sport
- Sport: Fencing
Medal record
Representing Canada
Pan American Games
Bronze medal – third place	2007 Rio de Janeiro	Sabre
Bronze medal – third place	2007 Rio de Janeiro	Sabre Team
Silver medal – second place	2011 Guadalajara	Epee Team
Silver medal – second place	2011 Guadalajara	Foil Team
- Updated on July 2012

Sandra Sassine (born September 28, 1979) is a Canadian fencer. She was born in Chibougamau, Quebec. She competed in the individual and team sabre events at the 2008 Summer Olympics. In the women's sabre in 2008, she competed in section 3, beating Elvira Wood in the first round, but was eliminated in the second round by gold medalist Mariel Zagunis. She placed 28th overall. She was a member of the Canadian team that finished in 7th place in the team sabre event.

She competed in the women's individual sabre event at the 2012 Summer Olympics where she lost to Aleksandra Socha in the first round.
