= Bao Yingying =

Chinese fencer (born 1983)

Personal information
- Born: 6 November 1983 (age 42) Qidong, Nantong, Jiangsu, China
Medal record
Representing China
Women's Fencing
Olympic Games
Silver medal – second place	2008 Beijing	Team sabre
World Championships
Bronze medal – third place	2009 Antalya	Team Sabre

Bao Yingying (Chinese: 包盈盈; pinyin: Bāo Yíngyíng; born 6 November 1983 in Qidong, Nantong, Jiangsu) is a female Chinese sabre fencer, who competed at the 2008 Summer Olympics.

== Major performances ==
Year	Competition	Individual	Team
2001	World University Games	Bronze	Silver
2002	World Junior Championships	Gold	
2002	Asian Games		Gold
2002	World Cup		Gold
2003	World University Games	Gold	Bronze
2003	World Championships		Silver
2008	World Cup	Gold	
2009	World Championships		Bronze
2009	World University Games	Silver	
2019	Asian Championships		Gold

== See also ==
- China at the 2008 Summer Olympics
