= Fencing at the 2010 Asian Games =

- Venue: Guangda Gymnasium
- Dates: 18–23 November 2010
- Competitors: 221 from 23 nations

Fencing at the 2010 Asian Games was held in Guangda Gymnasium, Guangzhou, China from November 18 to 23, 2010.

== Schedule ==
P	Pools	F	Finals

Event↓/Date →	18th Thu		19th Fri		20th Sat		21st Sun	22nd Mon	23rd Tue
Men's individual épée	P	F							
Men's team épée							F		
Men's individual foil					P	F			
Men's team foil									F
Men's individual sabre			P	F					
Men's team sabre								F	
Women's individual épée					P	F			
Women's team épée									F
Women's individual foil			P	F					
Women's team foil								F	
Women's individual sabre	P	F							
Women's team sabre							F		

== Medalists ==
=== Men ===
Event	Gold	Silver	Bronze
Individual épée	Kim Won-jin; South Korea	Li Guojie; China	Yin Lianchi; China
Individual épée	Kim Won-jin; South Korea	Li Guojie; China	Shogo Nishida; Japan
Team épée	South Korea; Jung Jin-sun; Jung Seung-hwa; Kim Won-jin; Park Kyoung-doo	Kazakhstan; Elmir Alimzhanov; Alexandr Axenov; Dmitriy Gryaznov; Sergey Shabalin	China; Dong Chao; Li Guojie; Wang Sen; Yin Lianchi
Team épée	South Korea; Jung Jin-sun; Jung Seung-hwa; Kim Won-jin; Park Kyoung-doo	Kazakhstan; Elmir Alimzhanov; Alexandr Axenov; Dmitriy Gryaznov; Sergey Shabalin	Japan; Kazuyasu Minobe; Shogo Nishida; Keisuke Sakamoto
Individual foil	Choi Byung-chul; South Korea	Cheung Siu Lun; Hong Kong	Yuki Ota; Japan
Individual foil	Choi Byung-chul; South Korea	Cheung Siu Lun; Hong Kong	Lei Sheng; China
Team foil	China; Huang Liangcai; Lei Sheng; Zhang Liangliang; Zhu Jun	Japan; Suguru Awaji; Kenta Chida; Yusuke Fukuda; Yuki Ota	South Korea; Choi Byung-chul; Ha Tae-gyu; Heo Jun; Kwon Young-ho
Team foil	China; Huang Liangcai; Lei Sheng; Zhang Liangliang; Zhu Jun	Japan; Suguru Awaji; Kenta Chida; Yusuke Fukuda; Yuki Ota	Hong Kong; Cheung Siu Lun; Chu Wing Hong; Lau Kwok Kin; Kevin Ngan
Individual sabre	Gu Bon-gil; South Korea	Zhong Man; China	Oh Eun-seok; South Korea
Individual sabre	Gu Bon-gil; South Korea	Zhong Man; China	Wang Jingzhi; China
Team sabre	China; Jiang Kelü; Liu Xiao; Wang Jingzhi; Zhong Man	South Korea; Gu Bon-gil; Kim Jung-hwan; Oh Eun-seok; Won Woo-young	Kazakhstan; Yevgeniy Frolov; Yerali Tilenshiyev; Zhanserik Turlybekov
Team sabre	China; Jiang Kelü; Liu Xiao; Wang Jingzhi; Zhong Man	South Korea; Gu Bon-gil; Kim Jung-hwan; Oh Eun-seok; Won Woo-young	Japan; Shinya Kudo; Satoshi Ogawa; Koji Yamamoto

=== Women ===
Event	Gold	Silver	Bronze
Individual épée	Luo Xiaojuan; China	Nozomi Nakano; Japan	Xu Anqi; China
Individual épée	Luo Xiaojuan; China	Nozomi Nakano; Japan	Yeung Chui Ling; Hong Kong
Team épée	Japan; Megumi Ikeda; Nozomi Nakano; Ayaka Shimookawa	China; Luo Xiaojuan; Sun Yujie; Xu Anqi; Yin Mingfang	South Korea; Jung Hyo-jung; Oh Yun-hee; Park Se-ra; Shin A-lam
Team épée	Japan; Megumi Ikeda; Nozomi Nakano; Ayaka Shimookawa	China; Luo Xiaojuan; Sun Yujie; Xu Anqi; Yin Mingfang	Hong Kong; Bjork Cheng; Cheung Sik Lui; Sabrina Lui; Yeung Chui Ling
Individual foil	Nam Hyun-hee; South Korea	Chen Jinyan; China	Jeon Hee-sook; South Korea
Individual foil	Nam Hyun-hee; South Korea	Chen Jinyan; China	Dai Huili; China
Team foil	South Korea; Jeon Hee-sook; Nam Hyun-hee; Oh Ha-na; Seo Mi-jung	Japan; Kanae Ikehata; Shiho Nishioka; Chie Yoshizawa	Hong Kong; Valerie Cheng; Cheung Ho King; Lau Hiu Wai; Lin Po Heung
Team foil	South Korea; Jeon Hee-sook; Nam Hyun-hee; Oh Ha-na; Seo Mi-jung	Japan; Kanae Ikehata; Shiho Nishioka; Chie Yoshizawa	China; Chen Jinyan; Dai Huili; Le Huilin; Shi Yun
Individual sabre	Kim Hye-lim; South Korea	Au Sin Ying; Hong Kong	Kim Keum-hwa; South Korea
Individual sabre	Kim Hye-lim; South Korea	Au Sin Ying; Hong Kong	Tan Xue; China
Team sabre	China; Bao Yingying; Chen Xiaodong; Tan Xue; Zhu Min	South Korea; Kim Hye-lim; Kim Keum-hwa; Lee Ra-jin; Lee Woo-ree	Kazakhstan; Aliya Bekturganova; Anastassiya Gimatdinova; Tamara Pochekutova; Yuliya Zhivitsa
Team sabre	China; Bao Yingying; Chen Xiaodong; Tan Xue; Zhu Min	South Korea; Kim Hye-lim; Kim Keum-hwa; Lee Ra-jin; Lee Woo-ree	Hong Kong; Au Sin Ying; Au Yeung Wai Sum; Fong Yi Tak; Lam Hin Wai

== Medal table ==
Rank	Nation	Gold	Silver	Bronze	Total
1	South Korea (KOR)	7	2	5	14
2	China (CHN)	4	4	8	16
3	Japan (JPN)	1	3	4	8
4	Hong Kong (HKG)	0	2	5	7
5	Kazakhstan (KAZ)	0	1	2	3
Totals (5 entries)		12	12	24	48

== Participating nations ==
A total of 221 athletes from 23 nations competed in fencing at the 2010 Asian Games:

- Athletes from Kuwait (11)
- Brunei (1)
- China (24)
- Chinese Taipei (4)
- Hong Kong (21)
- India (19)
- Indonesia (2)
- Iran (11)
- Japan (19)
- Jordan (1)
- Kazakhstan (14)
- Kyrgyzstan (8)
- Lebanon (3)
- Malaysia (3)
- Philippines (2)
- Qatar (12)
- Saudi Arabia (9)
- Singapore (8)
- South Korea (24)
- Thailand (7)
- United Arab Emirates (3)
- Uzbekistan (4)
- Vietnam (11)
