= Fencing at the 2010 Asian Games – Women's team sabre =

Women's team sabre at the 2010 Asian Games
- Venue: Guangda Gymnasium
- Date: 21 November 2010
- Competitors: 26 from 7 nations

Medalists
gold medal	China; Bao Yingying, Chen Xiaodong, Tan Xue, Zhu Min
silver medal	South Korea; Kim Hye-lim, Kim Keum-hwa, Lee Ra-jin, Lee Woo-ree
bronze medal	Kazakhstan; Aliya Bekturganova, Anastassiya Gimatdinova, Tamara Pochekutova, Yuliya Zhivitsa
bronze medal	Hong Kong; Au Sin Ying, Au Yeung Wai Sum, Fong Yi Tak, Lam Hin Wai

The women's team sabre competition at the 2010 Asian Games in Guangzhou was held on 21 November at the Guangda Gymnasium.

== Schedule ==
All times are China Standard Time (UTC+08:00)

Date	Time	Event
Sunday, 21 November 2010	09:00	Quarterfinals
Sunday, 21 November 2010	10:30	Semifinals
Sunday, 21 November 2010	18:00	Gold medal match

== Seeding ==
The teams were seeded taking into account the results achieved by competitors representing each team in the individual event.

Rank	Team	Fencer		Total
Rank	Team	1	2	Total
1	South Korea (KOR)	1	3	4
2	China (CHN)	3	6	9
3	Hong Kong (HKG)	2	8	10
4	Kazakhstan (KAZ)	7	9	16
5	Singapore (SIN)	5	13	18
6	Japan (JPN)	10	11	21
7	India (IND)	15	18	33

== Results ==
Quarterfinals
5	Singapore	35
4	Kazakhstan	45
3	Hong Kong	45
6	Japan	33
7	India	16
2	China	45

Semifinals
1	South Korea	45
4	Kazakhstan	29
3	Hong Kong	29
2	China	45

Gold medal match
1	South Korea	40
2	China	45

== Final standing ==
Rank	Team
1st place, gold medalist(s)	China (CHN); Bao Yingying; Chen Xiaodong; Tan Xue; Zhu Min
2nd place, silver medalist(s)	South Korea (KOR); Kim Hye-lim; Kim Keum-hwa; Lee Ra-jin; Lee Woo-ree
3rd place, bronze medalist(s)	Kazakhstan (KAZ); Aliya Bekturganova; Anastassiya Gimatdinova; Tamara Pochekutova; Yuliya Zhivitsa
3rd place, bronze medalist(s)	Hong Kong (HKG); Au Sin Ying; Au Yeung Wai Sum; Fong Yi Tak; Lam Hin Wai
5	Singapore (SIN); Ann Lee; Lewina Lee; Nona Lim; Nelicia Low
6	Japan (JPN); Maho Hamada; Seira Nakayama; Chizuru Oginezawa
7	India (IND); Bhavani Devi; Reesha Puthussery; Komalpreet Shukla
