= Fencing at the 2010 Asian Games – Women's individual sabre =

Women's individual sabre at the 2010 Asian Games
- Venue: Guangda Gymnasium
- Date: 18 November 2010
- Competitors: 18 from 13 nations

Medalists
gold medal	Kim Hye-lim	South Korea
silver medal	Au Sin Ying	Hong Kong
bronze medal	Kim Keum-hwa	South Korea
bronze medal	Tan Xue	China

The women's individual sabre competition at the 2010 Asian Games in Guangzhou was held on 18 November at the Guangda Gymnasium.

== Schedule ==
All times are China Standard Time (UTC+08:00)

Date	Time	Event
Thursday, 18 November 2010	09:00	Round of pools
Thursday, 18 November 2010	10:30	Round of 16
Thursday, 18 November 2010	11:20	Quarterfinals
Thursday, 18 November 2010	18:00	Semifinals
Thursday, 18 November 2010	19:40	Gold medal match

== Results ==
=== Round of pools ===
==== Pool 1 ====
Athlete	CHN	JPN	HKG	IND	SIN	LIB
Zhu Min (CHN)	—	5–0	3–5	5–0	4–5	5–2
Seira Nakayama (JPN)	0–5	—	4–5	5–4	4–5	5–4
Au Sin Ying (HKG)	5–3	5–4	—	5–3	5–2	5–3
Bhavani Devi (IND)	0–5	4–5	3–5	—	1–5	5–3
Ann Lee (SIN)	5–4	5–4	2–5	5–1	—	5–3
Alexandra Tannous (LIB)	2–5	4–5	3–5	3–5	3–5	—

==== Pool 2 ====
Athlete	KOR	HKG	THA	KAZ	JPN	VIE
Kim Keum-hwa (KOR)	—	5–2	5–0	5–1	5–1	5–3
Au Yeung Wai Sum (HKG)	2–5	—	5–2	3–5	5–4	5–0
Sirawalai Starrat (THA)	0–5	2–5	—	0–5	5–4	1–5
Yuliya Zhivitsa (KAZ)	1–5	5–3	5–0	—	3–5	5–4
Chizuru Oginezawa (JPN)	1–5	4–5	4–5	5–3	—	5–1
Nguyễn Thị Thanh Loan (VIE)	3–5	0–5	5–1	4–5	1–5	—

==== Pool 3 ====
Athlete	KOR	CHN	KAZ	SIN	IND	INA
Kim Hye-lim (KOR)	—	2–5	5–2	5–2	5–3	5–3
Tan Xue (CHN)	5–2	—	5–4	5–1	5–4	5–0
Tamara Pochekutova (KAZ)	2–5	4–5	—	5–3	5–1	5–2
Nona Lim (SIN)	2–5	1–5	3–5	—	5–0	4–5
Reesha Puthussery (IND)	3–5	4–5	1–5	0–5	—	3–5
Diah Permatasari (INA)	3–5	0–5	2–5	5–4	5–3	—

==== Summary ====
Rank	Pool	Athlete	W	L	W/M	TD	TF
1	2	Kim Keum-hwa (KOR)	5	0	1.000	+18	25
2	3	Tan Xue (CHN)	5	0	1.000	+14	25
3	1	Au Sin Ying (HKG)	5	0	1.000	+10	25
4	3	Kim Hye-lim (KOR)	4	1	0.800	+7	22
5	1	Ann Lee (SIN)	4	1	0.800	+5	22
6	1	Zhu Min (CHN)	3	2	0.600	+10	22
7	3	Tamara Pochekutova (KAZ)	3	2	0.600	+5	21
8	2	Au Yeung Wai Sum (HKG)	3	2	0.600	+4	20
9	2	Yuliya Zhivitsa (KAZ)	3	2	0.600	+2	19
10	2	Chizuru Oginezawa (JPN)	2	3	0.400	0	19
11	1	Seira Nakayama (JPN)	2	3	0.400	–5	18
12	3	Diah Permatasari (INA)	2	3	0.400	–7	15
13	3	Nona Lim (SIN)	1	4	0.200	–5	15
14	2	Nguyễn Thị Thanh Loan (VIE)	1	4	0.200	–8	13
15	1	Bhavani Devi (IND)	1	4	0.200	–10	13
16	2	Sirawalai Starrat (THA)	1	4	0.200	–16	8
17	1	Alexandra Tannous (LIB)	0	5	0.000	–10	15
18	3	Reesha Puthussery (IND)	0	5	0.000	–14	11

=== Knockout round ===
Round of 16
9	Yuliya Zhivitsa (KAZ)	14
8	Au Yeung Wai Sum (HKG)	15
5	Ann Lee (SIN)	15
12	Diah Permatasari (INA)	11
13	Nona Lim (SIN)	3
4	Kim Hye-lim (KOR)	15
3	Au Sin Ying (HKG)	15
14	Nguyễn Thị Thanh Loan (VIE)	8
11	Seira Nakayama (JPN)	9
6	Zhu Min (CHN)	15
7	Tamara Pochekutova (KAZ)	15
10	Chizuru Oginezawa (JPN)	14

Quarterfinals
1	Kim Keum-hwa (KOR)	15
8	Au Yeung Wai Sum (HKG)	3
5	Ann Lee (SIN)	8
4	Kim Hye-lim (KOR)	15
3	Au Sin Ying (HKG)	15
6	Zhu Min (CHN)	11
7	Tamara Pochekutova (KAZ)	6
2	Tan Xue (CHN)	15

Semifinals
1	Kim Keum-hwa (KOR)	11
4	Kim Hye-lim (KOR)	15
3	Au Sin Ying (HKG)	15
2	Tan Xue (CHN)	8

Gold medal match
4	Kim Hye-lim (KOR)	15
3	Au Sin Ying (HKG)	7

== Final standing ==
Rank	Athlete
1st place, gold medalist(s)	Kim Hye-lim (KOR)
2nd place, silver medalist(s)	Au Sin Ying (HKG)
3rd place, bronze medalist(s)	Kim Keum-hwa (KOR)
3rd place, bronze medalist(s)	Tan Xue (CHN)
5	Ann Lee (SIN)
6	Zhu Min (CHN)
7	Tamara Pochekutova (KAZ)
8	Au Yeung Wai Sum (HKG)
9	Yuliya Zhivitsa (KAZ)
10	Chizuru Oginezawa (JPN)
11	Seira Nakayama (JPN)
12	Diah Permatasari (INA)
13	Nona Lim (SIN)
14	Nguyễn Thị Thanh Loan (VIE)
15	Bhavani Devi (IND)
16	Sirawalai Starrat (THA)
17	Alexandra Tannous (LIB)
18	Reesha Puthussery (IND)
