= Fencing at the 2010 Asian Games – Women's team foil =

Women's team foil at the 2010 Asian Games
- Venue: Guangda Gymnasium
- Date: 22 November 2010
- Competitors: 28 from 8 nations

Medalists
gold medal	South Korea; Jeon Hee-sook, Nam Hyun-hee, Oh Ha-na, Seo Mi-jung
silver medal	Japan; Kanae Ikehata, Shiho Nishioka, Chie Yoshizawa
bronze medal	Hong Kong; Valerie Cheng, Cheung Ho King, Lau Hiu Wai, Lin Po Heung
bronze medal	China; Chen Jinyan, Dai Huili, Le Huilin, Shi Yun

The women's team foil competition at the 2010 Asian Games in Guangzhou was held on 22 November at the Guangda Gymnasium.

== Schedule ==
All times are China Standard Time (UTC+08:00)

Date	Time	Event
Monday, 22 November 2010	12:00	Quarterfinals
Monday, 22 November 2010	13:30	Semifinals
Monday, 22 November 2010	19:00	Gold medal match

== Seeding ==
The teams were seeded taking into account the results achieved by competitors representing each team in the individual event.

Rank	Team	Fencer		Total
Rank	Team	1	2	Total
1	South Korea (KOR)	1	3	4
2	China (CHN)	2	3	5
3	Japan (JPN)	5	8	13
4	Singapore (SIN)	6	7	13
5	Hong Kong (HKG)	9	11	20
6	Vietnam (VIE)	10	15	25
7	India (IND)	12	13	25
8	Qatar (QAT)	16	17	33

== Results ==
Quarterfinals			Semifinals			Gold medal match
1	South Korea	45
8	Qatar	4	1	South Korea	45
5	Hong Kong	45	5	Hong Kong	13
4	Singapore	36				1	South Korea	45
3	Japan	45				3	Japan	27
6	Vietnam	22	3	Japan	28
7	India	7	2	China	26
2	China	45

== Final standing ==
Rank	Team
1st place, gold medalist(s)	South Korea (KOR); Jeon Hee-sook; Nam Hyun-hee; Oh Ha-na; Seo Mi-jung
2nd place, silver medalist(s)	Japan (JPN); Kanae Ikehata; Shiho Nishioka; Chie Yoshizawa
3rd place, bronze medalist(s)	Hong Kong (HKG); Valerie Cheng; Cheung Ho King; Lau Hiu Wai; Lin Po Heung
3rd place, bronze medalist(s)	China (CHN); Chen Jinyan; Dai Huili; Le Huilin; Shi Yun
5	Singapore (SIN); Ruth Ng; Tay Yu Ling; Wang Wenying; Cheryl Wong
6	Vietnam (VIE); Lê Thị Bích; Nguyễn Thị Nguyệt; Nguyễn Thị Tươi
7	India (IND); S. Bindu Devi; W. Roji Devi; Athira Ramachandran
8	Qatar (QAT); Maryam Al-Khelaifi; Noora Al-Kuwari; Ghareeba Hammad
