= Swimming at the 2010 Asian Games – Women's 200 metre backstroke =

Women's 200 metre backstroke at the 2010 Asian Games
- Venue: Aoti Aquatics Centre
- Date: 14 November 2010
- Competitors: 14 from 10 nations

Medalists
gold medal	Zhao Jing	China
silver medal	Shiho Sakai	Japan
bronze medal	Aya Terakawa	Japan

The women's 200 metre backstroke event at the 2010 Asian Games took place on 14 November 2010 at Guangzhou Aoti Aquatics Centre.

There were 14 competitors from 10 countries who took part in this event. Two heats were held, the heat in which a swimmer competed did not formally matter for advancement, as the swimmers with the top eight times from the both field qualified for the finals.

Zhao Jing from China won the gold medal, two Japanese swimmers Shiho Sakai and Aya Terakawa won the silver and bronze medal respectively.

== Schedule ==
All times are China Standard Time (UTC+08:00)

Date	Time	Event
Sunday, 14 November 2010	09:50	Heats
Sunday, 14 November 2010	18:42	Final

== Records ==
Prior to this competition, the existing world, Asian and Games records were as follows.

World Record	Kirsty Coventry (ZIM)	2:04.81	Rome, Italy	1 August 2009
Asian Record	Reiko Nakamura (JPN)	2:07.13	Beijing, China	16 August 2008
Games Record	He Cihong (CHN)	2:09.46	Hiroshima, Japan	8 October 1994

== Results ==
=== Heats ===
Rank	Heat	Athlete	Time	Notes
1	2	Shiho Sakai (JPN)	2:09.68	
2	2	Zhou Yanxin (CHN)	2:10.83	
3	1	Zhao Jing (CHN)	2:13.66	
4	1	Aya Terakawa (JPN)	2:14.28	
5	2	Ham Chan-mi (KOR)	2:16.20	
6	1	Claudia Lau (HKG)	2:16.23	
7	2	Chen Ting (TPE)	2:18.61	
7	2	Yulduz Kuchkarova (UZB)	2:18.61	
9	2	Chavisa Thaveesupsoonthorn (THA)	2:23.14	
10	1	Yekaterina Rudenko (KAZ)	2:24.83	
11	1	Lee Joo-hyung (KOR)	2:26.71	
12	2	Kuan Weng I (MAC)	2:27.79	
13	1	Nguyễn Thị Kim Tuyến (VIE)	2:30.87	
14	1	Erica Vong (MAC)	2:35.46	

=== Final ===
Rank	Athlete	Time	Notes
1st place, gold medalist(s)	Zhao Jing (CHN)	2:06.46	AR
2nd place, silver medalist(s)	Shiho Sakai (JPN)	2:07.81	
3rd place, bronze medalist(s)	Aya Terakawa (JPN)	2:09.72	
4	Zhou Yanxin (CHN)	2:10.16	
5	Ham Chan-mi (KOR)	2:13.78	
6	Claudia Lau (HKG)	2:14.86	
7	Yulduz Kuchkarova (UZB)	2:17.59	
8	Chen Ting (TPE)	2:18.86	
