= Swimming at the 2010 Asian Games – Women's 100 metre backstroke =

2010 sports event

Women's 100 metre backstroke at the 2010 Asian Games
- Venue: Aoti Aquatics Centre
- Date: 17 November 2010
- Competitors: 17 from 13 nations

Medalists
gold medal	Zhao Jing	China
silver medal	Shiho Sakai	Japan
bronze medal	Gao Chang	China

The women's 100 metre backstroke event at the 2010 Asian Games took place on 17 November 2010 at Guangzhou Aoti Aquatics Centre.

There were 17 competitors from 13 countries who took part in this event. Three heats were held, the heat in which a swimmer competed did not formally matter for advancement, as the swimmers with the top eight times from the entire field qualified for the finals.

Zhao Jing and Gao Chang from China won the gold and bronze medal respectively, Japanese swimmer Shiho Sakai won the silver medal.

== Schedule ==
All times are China Standard Time (UTC+08:00)

Date	Time	Event
Wednesday, 17 November 2010	10:01	Heats
Wednesday, 17 November 2010	18:58	Final

== Records ==
Prior to this competition, the existing world, Asian and Games records were as follows.

World Record	Gemma Spofforth (GBR)	58.12	Rome, Italy	28 July 2009
Asian Record	Zhao Jing (CHN)	58.94	Guangzhou, China	13 November 2010
Games Record	Zhao Jing (CHN)	58.94	Guangzhou, China	13 November 2010

== Results ==
=== Heats ===
Rank	Heat	Athlete	Time	Notes
1	3	Shiho Sakai (JPN)	1:00.42	
2	3	Aya Terakawa (JPN)	1:01.58	
3	1	Gao Chang (CHN)	1:02.49	
4	2	Zhao Jing (CHN)	1:03.05	
5	3	Claudia Lau (HKG)	1:03.49	
6	3	Shana Lim (SIN)	1:03.73	
7	1	Yulduz Kuchkarova (UZB)	1:04.01	
8	2	Ham Chan-mi (KOR)	1:04.29	
9	2	Lee Joo-hyung (KOR)	1:05.01	
10	1	Chan Kah Yan (MAS)	1:05.27	
11	2	Chen Ting (TPE)	1:05.50	
12	1	Yekaterina Rudenko (KAZ)	1:05.63	
13	3	Kuan Weng I (MAC)	1:08.93	
14	3	Chavisa Thaveesupsoonthorn (THA)	1:09.08	
15	1	Erica Vong (MAC)	1:09.34	
16	2	Nguyễn Thị Kim Tuyến (VIE)	1:09.87	
17	2	Enegül Meredowa (TKM)	1:34.68	

=== Final ===
Rank	Athlete	Time	Notes
1st place, gold medalist(s)	Zhao Jing (CHN)	59.20	
2nd place, silver medalist(s)	Shiho Sakai (JPN)	59.87	
3rd place, bronze medalist(s)	Gao Chang (CHN)	59.90	
4	Aya Terakawa (JPN)	59.92	
5	Claudia Lau (HKG)	1:02.60	
6	Shana Lim (SIN)	1:03.10	
7	Yulduz Kuchkarova (UZB)	1:03.18	
8	Ham Chan-mi (KOR)	1:03.56	
