= Hong Kong at the 2010 Asian Games =

- IOC code: HKG
- NOC: Sports Federation and Olympic Committee of Hong Kong, China

in Guangzhou
- Competitors: 401 in 37 sports
- Officials: 152
- Medals Ranked 11th: Gold 8 Silver 15 Bronze 17 Total 40

Asian Games appearances (overview)
- 1954; 1958; 1962; 1966; 1970; 1974; 1978; 1982; 1986; 1990; 1994; 1998; 2002; 2006; 2010; 2014; 2018; 2022; 2026

Hong Kong participated in the 16th Asian Games in Guangzhou, China, from 12 to 27 November.

== Medal summary ==
=== Medal table ===
Sport	Gold	Silver	Bronze	Total
Badminton	0	0	1	1
Bowling	0	0	1	1
Cue Sports	2	0	1	3
Cycling - BMX	1	0	0	1
Cycling - Mountain Bike	1	0	0	1
Cycling - Road	1	0	0	1
Cycling - Track	1	4	1	6
Equestrian	0	0	1	1
Fencing	0	2	5	7
Karate	0	0	2	2
Rowing	0	1	1	2
Rugby union	0	1	0	1
Sailing	1	2	0	3
Squash	0	2	2	4
Swimming	0	0	2	2
Table Tennis	0	1	0	1
Wushu	1	2	0	3
Total	8	15	17	40

=== Medalists ===
Medal	Name	Sport	Event	Date
Gold	Wong Kam-po	Cycling	Men's road race	22 November
Gold	Marco Fu	Cue sports	Men's Snooker Singles	20 November
Gold	Chan King Yin	Sailing	Men's Mistral	20 November
Gold	Steven Wong	Cycling	Men's BMX	19 November
Gold	Chan Chun Hing	Cycling	Men's Cross-country	18 November
Gold	Geng Xiaoling	Wushu	Women's Changquan	16 November
Gold	Ip Wan In Jaique; Ng On-Yee; So Man Yan	Cue Sports	Women's 6-Red Snooker Team	14 November
Gold	Lee Wai Sze	Cycling	Women's 500 metre time trial	13 November

Medal	Name	Sport	Event	Date
Silver	Cheung King Lok	Cycling	Men's Individual Pursuit	14 November
Silver	Wong Wan Yiu	Cycling	Women's Points Race	16 November
Silver	Cheung King Wai; Choi Ki Ho; Cheung King Lok; Kwok Ho Ting	Cycling	Men's Team Pursuit	16 November
Silver	Zheng Tianhui	Wushu	Women's Jianshu\Qiangshu All-Round	14 November
Silver	He Jingde	Wushu	Men's Nanquan\Nangun All-Round	15 November
Silver	Kam Po Wong	Cycling	Men's Points Race	17 November
Silver	Kwong Wing Chow; Sau Wah So	Rowing	Lightweight Men's Double Sculls	18 November
Silver	Siu Lun Cheung	Fencing	Men's Individual Foil	20 November
Silver	Sin Ying Au	Fencing	Women's Individual Sabre	18 November
Silver	Hong Kong	Rugby	Men's	23 November
Silver	Hong Kong	Sailing	Women's Mistral	20 November
Silver	Hong Kong	Sailing	Women's RS:X	20 November
Silver	Annie Au	Squash	Women's Individual	21 November
Silver	Hong Kong	Squash	Women's Team	25 November
Silver	Yuk Cheung; Huajun Jiang	Table Tennis	Mixed Doubles	19 November

Medal	Name	Sport	Event	Date
Bronze	Ng On-Yee	Cue sports	Women's 6-Red Snooker Singles	16 November
Bronze	Yin Yan Claudia Lau; Fiona Ma; Hang Yu Sze; Hannah Jane Arnett Wilson	Swimming	Woman 4×100 m medley relay	13 November
Bronze	Hang Yu Sze; Wai Ting Yu; Hoi Shun Stephanie Au; Hannah Jane Arnett Wilson	Swimming	Woman 4×100 m freestyle relay	14 November
Bronze	Pui Yin Yip	Badminton	Women's Singles	19 November
Bronze	Hong Kong	Bowling	Men's Team of Five	22 November
Bronze	Wai Sze Lee	Cycling Track	Women's Sprint	17 November
Bronze	Hong Kong	Equestrian	Jumping Team	22 November
Bronze	Chui Ling Yeung	Fencing	Women's Individual Épée	20 November
Bronze	Hong Kong	Fencing	Men's Team Foil	23 November
Bronze	Hong Kong	Fencing	Women's Team Foil	22 November
Bronze	Hong Kong	Fencing	Women's Team Épée	23 November
Bronze	Hong Kong	Fencing	Women's Team Sabre	21 November
Bronze	Ka Man Chan	Karate	Women's -61 kg	26 November
Bronze	Ka Wai Lee	Karate	Men's -75 kg	26 November
Bronze	Hong Kong	Karate	Lightweight Men's Four	18 November
Bronze	Hong Kong	Squash	Men's Team	24 November
Bronze	Ho Ling Chan	Squash	Women's Individual	20 November

== Athletics ==
=== Men ===
Track events

Event	Athletes	Heat Round 1		Semifinal		Final	
Event	Athletes	Result	Rank	Result	Rank	Result	Rank
100 m	Lai Chun Ho	10.43 SB	2nd Q	10.42 SB	3rd Q	10.32 PB	4th
100 m	Tsui Chi Ho	10.43	3rd Q	10.32	2nd Q	12.26	8th
200 m	Leung Ki Ho	21.25	3rd			did not advance	
200 m	Tang Yik Chun	21.67	5th			did not advance	
4x100 m relay	Tang Yik Chun; Lai Chun Ho; Yip Siu Keung; Tsui Chi Ho	39.87	3rd Q			39.62	5th

Field events

Event	Athletes	Qualification		Final	
Event	Athletes	Result	Rank	Result	Rank
High jump	Lui Tsz Hin Daniel	2.10	5th Q	2.10	10th

Road events

Event	Athletes		
Event	Athletes	Final	
Event	Athletes	Result	Rank
Marathon	Lai Hok Yan Jonny	2:36:21	14th

=== Women ===
Track events

Event	Athletes	Heat Round 1		Semifinal		Final	
Event	Athletes	Result	Rank	Result	Rank	Result	Rank
100 m	Lam On Ki	12.09	5th	did not advance			
100 m	Leung Hau Sze	12.12	6th	did not advance			
4x100 m relay	Lam On Ki; Chan Ho Yee; Leung Hau Sze; Wan Kin Yee; Hui Man Ling	47.23	4th q			46.40 SB	7th

== Badminton ==
=== Men ===
Athlete	Event	Round of 32	Round of 16	Quarterfinals	Semifinals	Final
Athlete	Event	Opposition Score	Opposition Score	Opposition Score	Opposition Score	Opposition Score
Chan Yan Kit	Singles	Mohamed Sharim (MDV); W 2-0 (21-4, 21-7)	Lee Chong Wei (MAS); L 1-2 (21-17, 9-21, 6-21)	did not advance		
Hu Yun	Singles	Yara Azad (IRQ); W 2-0 (21-18, 21-9)	Lin Dan (CHN); L 0-2 (6-21, 13-21)	did not advance		
Leung Chun Yiu; Vincent Wong	Doubles	Hirokatsu Hashimoto and Noriyasu Hirata (JPN); L 0-2 (10-21, 9-21)	did not advance			
Yohan Hadikusumo Wiratama; Wong Wai Hong	Doubles	Ratna Jit Tamang and Sajan Krishna Tamrakar (NEP); W 2-0 (21-5, 21-10)	Cai Yun and Fu Haifeng (CHN); L 0-2 (14-21, 17-21)	did not advance		
Chan Yan Kit; Hu Yun; Leung Chun Yiu; Vincent Wong; Yohan Hadikusumo Wiratama; Wong Wai Hong	Team		Bye	China; L 0-3 (0-2, 0-2, 0-2)	did not advance	

=== Women ===
Athlete	Event	Round of 32	Round of 16	Quarterfinals	Semifinals	Final
Athlete	Event	Opposition Score	Opposition Score	Opposition Score	Opposition Score	Opposition Score
Chan Tsz Ka	Singles	Sara Devi Tamang (NEP); W 2-0 (21-12, 21-5)	Bae Youn-Joo (KOR); L 0-2 (14-21, 14-21)	did not advance		
Yip Pui Yin	Singles	BYE	Pai Hsiao-ma (TPE); W 2-0 (21-17, 21-12)	Saina Nehwal (IND); W 2-1 (21-8, 8-21, 21-19)	Wang Shixian (CHN); L 0-2 (14-21, 14-21) (bronze)	did not advance
Chan Tsz Ka; Chau Hoi Wah	Doubles	Hsieh Pei-chen and Wang Pei-rong (TPE); L 0-2 (14-21, 15-21)	did not advance			
Poon Lok Yan; Tse Ying Suet	Doubles	Shendy Puspa Irawati and Nitya Krishinda Maheswari (INA); L 1-2 (16-21, 21-15, 18-21)	did not advance			
Chan Tsz Ka; Chau Hoi Wah; Mong Kwan Yi; Poon Lok Yan; Tse Ying Suet; Yip Pui Yin	Team		Malaysia; L 1-3 (1-2, 2-1, 1-2, 1-2)	did not advance		

=== Mixed ===
Athlete	Event	Round of 32	Round of 16	Quarterfinals	Semifinals	Final
Athlete	Event	Opposition Score	Opposition Score	Opposition Score	Opposition Score	Opposition Score
Wong Wai Hong; Chau Hoi Wah	Doubles	He Hanbin and Ma Jin (CHN); L 0-2 (18-21, 14-21)	did not advance			
Yohan Hadikusumo Wiratama; Tse Ying Suet	Doubles	BYE	Sudket Prapakamol and Saralee Thungthongkam (THA); L 0-2 (16-21, 13-21)	did not advance		

== Baseball ==
=== Men ===
Team

Au Colina Gabriel Chiho
Au Wing Leung
Chan Chun Wah
Chan Kei Wa
Chau Chun Shing Duncan
Chiu Chi Kam Kenneth
Chiu Yan Nok Enroy
Chu Ho Yuen
Ip Kam Tao Colin
Leung Ho Nam
Leung Yu Chung
Li Wing Sing
Nau Ching Nam
Ng Yuk Ming
Tang Shu Nin
Tsang Kai Kong
Tsang Kin Chung
Wu Chun Yeung
Wu Tsz Fung
Wu Tsz Fung
Yeung Kun Hin
Yung Tsun Wai

Pool B

Team	Pld	W	L	RF	RA
South Korea	3	3	0	38	1
Chinese Taipei	3	2	1	28	7
Pakistan	3	1	2	6	31
Hong Kong	3	0	3	3	36

November 13 13:00 at Aoti Baseball Field, Guangzhou
Team	1	2	3	4	5	6	7	8	9	R	H	E
Pakistan	0	0	0	0	0	1	1	0	3	5	11	1
Hong Kong	0	0	1	0	2	0	0	0	0	3	5	4
WP: Ihsan Ullah LP: Leung Yu Chung; Attendance: 450

November 14 18:00 at Aoti Baseball Field, Guangzhou
Team	1	2	3	4	5	6	7	8	9	R	H	E
Hong Kong	0	0	0	0	0	0	X	X	X	0	3	2
South Korea	0	3	0	2	4	6	X	X	X	15	12	0
WP: Im Tae-Hoon LP: Duncan Chau; Home runs: HKG: None; KOR: Kang Jung-Ho (1); Attendance: 400

November 15 12:00 at Aoti Baseball Field, Guangzhou
Team	1	2	3	4	5	6	7	8	9	R	H	E
Hong Kong	0	0	0	0	0	X	X	X	X	0	4	1
Chinese Taipei	3	3	4	6	X	X	X	X	X	16	11	0
WP: Lin Ying-chieh LP: Kenneth Chiu; Home runs: HKG: None; TPE: Lin Yi-chuan (1); Attendance: 420

== Basketball ==
=== Men ===
Team

Chan Yik Lun
Cheung Wai Hong
Chow Ka Kui
Chow Kin Wan
Fong Shing Yee
Heung Chun Keung Mike
Lau Hoi To
Liang Man Hung
Poon Chi Ho
Szeto Wai Kit
Tsoi Lung Tak
Wong Chun Wai

- In the qualifying round, Hong Kong lose to DPR Korea 71–78

Team	Pld	W	L	PF	PA	PD	Pts
North Korea	1	1	0	78	71	+7	2
Hong Kong	1	0	1	71	78	−7	1

November 13
19:15

Hong Kong	71–78	North Korea
Scoring by quarter: 21–16, 16–20, 10–20, 24–22
Pts: Liang M.H. 12; Rebs: Fong S.Y. 9 Asts: Wong C.W. 3		Pts: Pak U.C. 19; Rebs: Kye H.U. 13; Asts: Kye H.U. 5

Huangpu Gymnasium, Guangzhou
Referees: Eddie Viator (FRA), Teerapong Yodsint (THA), Ramesh Kumar (IND)

== Beach volleyball ==
=== Men ===
Athlete	Event	Preliminary Round			Round of 16	Quarterfinals	Semifinals	Finals
Athlete	Event	Opposition Score	Opposition Score	Opposition Score	Opposition Score	Opposition Score	Opposition Score	Opposition Score
Wong Chun Wai; Wong Kwun Pong	Men's beach volleyball	An Tae-Young (KOR) and Kwon Yong-Seok (KOR); W 2-0 (21-18, 21-16)	Alexandr Dyachenko (KAZ) and Alexey Sidorenko (KAZ); L 0-2 (11-21, 8-21)		Andy Ardiyansah (INA) and Koko Prasetyo Darkuncoro (INA); L 0-2 (19-21, 16-21)	did not advance		

=== Women ===
Athlete	Event	Preliminary Round			Round of 16	Quarterfinals	Semifinals	Finals
Athlete	Event	Opposition Score	Opposition Score	Opposition Score	Opposition Score	Opposition Score	Opposition Score	Opposition Score
Tse Wing Hung; Kong Cheuk Yee	Women's beach volleyball	Lee Hyun-Jung (KOR) and Lee Eun-A (KOR); W 2-0 (19-21, 21-17, 15-10)	Lyudmila Issayeva (KAZ) and Inna Rakhmatulina (KAZ); L 0-2 (19-21, 12-21)	Xue Chen (CHN) and Zhang Xi (CHN); L 0-2 (6-21, 10-21)	Shinako Tanaka (JPN) and Sayaka Mizoe (JPN); L 0-2 (17-21, 14-21)	did not advance		

== Board games ==
=== Weiqi ===
Athlete	Event	Win	Lost	Points	Rank	Semifinals		Finals	
Athlete	Event	Win	Lost	Points	Rank	Opposition	Result	Opposition	Result
Yang Shi Hai; Kan Ying	Mixed doubles	4	2	8	7th	did not advance			
Chan Nai San; Wong Lok Ying	Mixed doubles	2	4	4	12th	did not advance			

=== Xiangqi ===
Athlete	Event	Round 1	Round 2	Round 3	Round 4	Round 5	Round 6	Round 7	Win	Draw	Lost	Points	Rank
Athlete	Event	Opposition Result	Opposition Result	Opposition Result	Opposition Result	Opposition Result	Opposition Result	Opposition Result	Win	Draw	Lost	Points	Rank
Chiu Yu Kuen	Men's individual	Lu Qin (CHN); L	Lay Chhay (CAM); W	Ma Chung-wei (TPE); D	Lai Ly Huynh (VIE); D	Wong Wan Heng (MAS); W	Lay Kam Hock (MAS); W	Nguyen Thanh Bao (VIE); L	3	2	2	8	6th
Chan Chun Kit	Men's individual	Sandy Chua (PHI); W	Kazuharu Shoshi (JPN); W	Hong Zhi (CHN); L	Wu Kui Lin (TPE); L	Lei Kam Fun (MAC); D	Ma Chung-wei (TPE); D	Lay Kam Hock (MAS); D	2	2	3	7	10th
Lam Ka Yan	Women's individual	Gao Yi-ping (TPE); L	Ayaka Ikeda (JPN); W	Tang Dan (CHN); L	Wang Linna (CHN); L	Hoang Thi Hai Binh (VIE); D	Ngo Lan Huong (VIE); L	Peng Jou-an (TPE); W	2	1	4	5	5th

== Bowling ==
=== Men ===
Athlete	Event	Games 1–6						Total	Average	Grand Total	Rank
Athlete	Event	1	2	3	4	5	6	Total	Average	Grand Total	Rank
Cheuk Yin Mak	Men's singles	229	258	204	225	203	226	1345	224.2		11th
Tak Hin Tseng	Men's singles	214	215	247	289	188	185	1328	221.3		16th
Chun Chung Cheung	Men's singles	203	213	224	182	204	223	1249	208.2		36th
Wai Ki Yeung	Men's singles	206	227	171	203	200	214	1221	203.5		45th
Pak Kei Tsang	Men's singles	144	210	187	213	191	268	1213	202.2		49th
Wu Siu Hong	Men's singles	200	205	192	184	157	248	1186	197.7		67th
Wai Ki Yeung; Pak Kei Tsang	Men's doubles	228	210	185	199	190	251	1263	210.5	2570	11th
Wai Ki Yeung; Pak Kei Tsang	Men's doubles	227	224	277	173	222	214	1307	217.8	2570	11th
Wu Siu Hong; Cheuk Yin Mak	Men's doubles	208	224	174	211	255	192	1264	210.7	2498	19th
Wu Siu Hong; Cheuk Yin Mak	Men's doubles	203	217	222	224	192	176	1234	205.7	2498	19th
Chun Chung Cheung; Tak Hin Tseng	Men's doubles	245	190	201	158	210	188	1192	198.7	2457	25th
Chun Chung Cheung; Tak Hin Tseng	Men's doubles	265	195	208	199	234	164	1265	210.8	2457	25th
Wu Siu Hong; Cheuk Yin Mak; Tak Hin Tseng	Men's trios	216	176	211	196	168	171	1138	189.7	3849	5th
Wu Siu Hong; Cheuk Yin Mak; Tak Hin Tseng	Men's trios	250	204	227	237	180	239	1337	222.8	3849	5th
Wu Siu Hong; Cheuk Yin Mak; Tak Hin Tseng	Men's trios	275	210	194	226	256	213	1374	229.0	3849	5th
Chun Chung Cheung; Wai Ki Yeung; Pak Kei Tsang	Men's trios	197	175	198	184	192	212	1158	193.0	3603	21st
Chun Chung Cheung; Wai Ki Yeung; Pak Kei Tsang	Men's trios	178	188	222	223	206	174	1191	198.5	3603	21st
Chun Chung Cheung; Wai Ki Yeung; Pak Kei Tsang	Men's trios	229	213	208	169	214	221	1254	209.0	3603	21st
Wu Siu Hong; Tak Hin Tseng; Cheuk Yin Mak; Wai Ki Yeung; Pak Kei Tsang	Men's team of five	209	237	209	226	254	224	1359	226.5	6475	3rd place, bronze medalist(s)
Wu Siu Hong; Tak Hin Tseng; Cheuk Yin Mak; Wai Ki Yeung; Pak Kei Tsang	Men's team of five	197	221	198	254	190	203	1263	210.5	6475	3rd place, bronze medalist(s)
Wu Siu Hong; Tak Hin Tseng; Cheuk Yin Mak; Wai Ki Yeung; Pak Kei Tsang	Men's team of five	182	214	200	222	206	221	1245	207.5	6475	3rd place, bronze medalist(s)
Wu Siu Hong; Tak Hin Tseng; Cheuk Yin Mak; Wai Ki Yeung; Pak Kei Tsang	Men's team of five	169	251	215	172	254	163	1224	204.0	6475	3rd place, bronze medalist(s)
Wu Siu Hong; Tak Hin Tseng; Cheuk Yin Mak; Wai Ki Yeung; Pak Kei Tsang	Men's team of five	216	228	268	249	206	217	1384	230.7	6475	3rd place, bronze medalist(s)
Chun Chung Cheung	Men's team of five booster	213	248	227	197	172	194	1251	208.5		

All events

Athlete	Event	Singles	Doubles	Trío	Team	Total	Average	Rank
Tak Hin Tseng	Men's all events	1328	1265	1374	1263	5230	217.92	9th
Cheuk Yin Mak	Men's all events	1345	1234	1337	1245	5161	215.04	18th
Pak Kei Tsang	Men's all events	1213	1307	1254	1384	5158	214.92	20th
Wu Siu Hong	Men's all events	1186	1264	1138	1359	4947	206.13	45th
Wai Ki Yeung	Men's all events	1221	1263	1191	1224	4899	204.13	52nd
Chun Chung Cheung	Men's all events	1249	1192	1158	1251	4850	202.08	59th

Masters

Athlete	Event	Block 1 (Games 1–8)								Block 2 (Games 1–8)								Grand Total	Average	Rank	Stepladder 2nd - 3rd place	Stepladder 1st - 2nd place
Athlete	Event	1	2	3	4	5	6	7	8	1	2	3	4	5	6	7	8	Grand Total	Average	Rank	Opposition Score	Opposition Score
Tak Hin Tseng	Men's masters	223; 10	186; 0	242; 10	207; 10	212; 10	201; 0	206; 10	212; 0	215; 0	159; 0	204; 0	144; 0	247; 10	197; 0	224; 10	161; 0	3310	202.5	15th		
Cheuk Yin Mak	Men's masters	207; 0	218; 0	213; 10	237; 0	227; 10	157; 0	178; 0	170; 0	235; 10	169; 0	195; 10	210; 0	203; 0	162; 0	241; 10	165; 0	3237	199.2	16th		

=== Women ===
Athlete	Event	Games 1–6						Total	Average	Grand Total	Rank
Athlete	Event	1	2	3	4	5	6	Total	Average	Grand Total	Rank
Shuk Han Chan	Women's singles	180	218	150	225	200	179	1152	192.0		29th
Tsz Yin Ng	Women's singles	164	164	177	166	218	227	1116	186.0		41st
Suet Yee Vanessa Fung	Women's singles	191	186	138	191	215	164	1085	180.8		47th
Shun Yee Tam	Women's singles	181	158	147	227	172	156	1041	173.5		56th
Sze Yui Ho	Women's singles	156	194	144	190	156	152	992	165.3		64th
Shuk Han Chan; Suet Yee Vanessa Fung	Women's doubles	185	211	196	191	188	191	1162	193.7	2305	24th
Shuk Han Chan; Suet Yee Vanessa Fung	Women's doubles	197	210	175	183	185	193	1143	190.5	2305	24th
Tsz Yin Ng; Shun Yee Tam	Women's doubles	238	212	213	216	170	190	1239	206.5	2290	25th
Tsz Yin Ng; Shun Yee Tam	Women's doubles	167	189	180	195	175	145	1051	175.2	2290	25th
Sze Yui Ho	Women's doubles booster	201	162	199	203	139	164	1068	178.0		
Shuk Han Chan; Suet Yee Vanessa Fung; Tsz Yin Ng	Women's trios	180	170	207	203	226	198	1184	197.3	3493	12th
Shuk Han Chan; Suet Yee Vanessa Fung; Tsz Yin Ng	Women's trios	191	216	201	205	177	198	1188	198.0	3493	12th
Shuk Han Chan; Suet Yee Vanessa Fung; Tsz Yin Ng	Women's trios	205	155	165	213	181	202	1121	186.8	3493	12th
Shun Yee Tam	Women's trios booster	185	217	215	176	188	181	1162	193.7		
Sze Yui Ho	Women's trios booster	184	155	171	145	181	169	1005	167.5		
Shuk Han Chan; Suet Yee Vanessa Fung; Tsz Yin Ng; Shun Yee Tam; Sze Yui Ho	Women's team of five	210	195	204	205	210	183	1207	201.2	5897	7th
Shuk Han Chan; Suet Yee Vanessa Fung; Tsz Yin Ng; Shun Yee Tam; Sze Yui Ho	Women's team of five	192	195	217	202	208	211	1225	204.2	5897	7th
Shuk Han Chan; Suet Yee Vanessa Fung; Tsz Yin Ng; Shun Yee Tam; Sze Yui Ho	Women's team of five	170	206	224	248	217	197	1262	210.3	5897	7th
Shuk Han Chan; Suet Yee Vanessa Fung; Tsz Yin Ng; Shun Yee Tam; Sze Yui Ho	Women's team of five	181	183	173	178	212	210	1137	189.5	5897	7th
Shuk Han Chan; Suet Yee Vanessa Fung; Tsz Yin Ng; Shun Yee Tam; Sze Yui Ho	Women's team of five	181	166	160	226	151	182	1066	177.7	5897	7th

All events

Athlete	Event	Singles	Doubles	Trío	Team	Total	Average	Rank
Tsz Yin Ng	Women's all events	1116	1239	1121	1262	4738	197.42	35th
Shuk Han Chan	Women's all events	1152	1162	1184	1207	4705	196.04	38th
Suet Yee Vanessa Fung	Women's all events	1085	1143	1188	1225	4641	193.38	41st
Shun Yee Tam	Women's all events	1041	1051	1162	1137	4391	182.96	57th
Sze Yui Ho	Women's all events	992	1068	1005	1066	4131	172.13	63rd

== Canoeing ==
=== Canoe-Kayak Slalom ===
Men

Athlete	Event	Preliminary				Semifinal		Final	
Athlete	Event	Run 1	Run 2	Total	Rank	Time	Rank	Time	Rank
Sze Lui	K-1	274.41	170.83	445.24	8th	187.28	8th	165.72	7th

== Cricket ==
=== Men ===
- In men, Hong Kong team is in group B and the competitors are Nepal and Maldives.

Team

Irfan Ahmed
Nadeem Ahmed
Zafaran Ali
Najeeb Amar
James Atkinson
Waqas Barkatt
Ilyas Gul
Aizaz Khan
Asif Khan
Roy Lamsam
Nicholas Lau
Kaiming Li
Ali-Niaz
Farooq Saeed
Shakeel

Group round

- Best 4 teams (three of the four ICC Full Members in Asia, Bangladesh, Pakistan and Sri Lanka as well as Afghanistan who played in the 2010 ICC World Twenty20) directly entered the quarterfinals.

Pool C

Team	Seed	Pld	W	L	NR	NRR	Pts
Hong Kong		2	2	0	0	+1.500	4
Nepal		2	1	1	0	+1.125	2
Maldives		2	0	2	0	–3.750	0

21 November
13:30
Scorecard

Hong Kong; 115/7 (20 overs)	v	Nepal; 85/9 (20 overs)
Roy Lamsam 47 (61); Amrit Bhattarai 3/16 (4 overs)		Sharad Vesawkar 16 (27); Nadeem Ahmed 3/12 (4 overs)

Hong Kong won by 30 runs
Guangdong International Cricket Stadium, Guangdong
Umpires: Viswanaoan Kalidas (Mas) and Sarika Prasad (Sin)

- Hong Kong won the toss and elected to bat.
- Points: Hong Kong 2, Nepal 0.

23 November
13:30
Scorecard

Hong Kong; 88/3 (14.1 Overs)	v	Maldives; 84/9 (20 Overs)
Jamie Atkinson 44 (30) 5X4, 2X6; Moosa Kaleem 1/12 (2.1 Overs)		Ahmed Nasir 21 (37) 1X4; Najeeb Amar 2/10 (4 Overs)

Hong Kong won by 7 wickets
Guangdong International Cricket Stadium, Guangdong

- Maldives won the toss and elected to bat.
- Points: Hong Kong 2, Maldives 0

Quarterfinals

24 November
09:30
Scorecard

Hong Kong; 63 (17.4 overs)	v	Afghanistan; 66/2 (13.2 overs)
Nadeem Ahmed 17 (29); Mirwais Ashraf 3/8 (4 overs)		Nawroz Mangal 20* (14); Nadeem Ahmed 1/13 (4 overs)

Afghanistan won by 8 wickets
Guangdong International Cricket Stadium, Guangdong
Umpires: Viswanaoan Kalidas (Mas) and Sarika Prasad (Sin)

- Hong Kong won the toss and elected to bat.

=== Women ===
- In woman, Hong Kong team will meet Bangladesh and Nepal in pool B.

Team

Mariko Hill
Ka Man Chan
Wun Ting Cheung
Yasmin Daswani
Ishitaa Gidwani
Keenu Gill
Hung Ying Ho
Manpreet Kaur
Kai Ling Li
Dominique McCusker
Alvina Tam
Connie Wong
Kristine Wong
Sze Wan Yip

Group round

Pool A

14 November
13:30
scorecard

Bangladesh; 26/0 (3.4 Overs)	v	Hong Kong; 25/10 (17.1 Overs)
PINKY Fargana Hoque 17* (17); 5/0 WONG Connie Ar Yan (1 overs)		GILL Kanwardeep Keenu 11 (39); 4/2 KHATUN Chamely (3 overs)

Bangladesh won by 10 wickets
Guangdong International Cricket Stadium, Guangdong
Umpires: SARIKA Sivaprasad (Sin), MOSUR Ramesh (Sin)

- Hong Kong won the toss and elected to bat first

16 November
13:30
scorecard

Hong Kong; 72/9 (20 overs)	v	Nepal; 73/3 (15.2 overs)
Connie Wong 47 (55); Nary Thapa 6/1 (4 overs)		Nary Thapa 28 (25); Connie Wong 7/1 (3.2 overs)

Nepal won by 7 wickets
Guangdong International Cricket Stadium, Guangdong
Umpires: Liu Jingmin (Chi) and V Kalidas (Mas)

- Hong Kong won the toss and elected to bat

== Cue Sports ==
Athlete	Event	Round of 64	Round of 32	Round of 16	Quarterfinals	Semifinals	Final
Athlete	Event	Opposition Result	Opposition Result	Opposition Result	Opposition Result	Opposition Result	Opposition Result
Kwok Chi Ho	Men's Eight-ball singles	Surathep Phoochalam (THA); L 4-7	did not advance				
Lee Chen Man	Men's Eight-ball singles	Nader Khan Sultani (AFG); L 6-7	did not advance				
Kwok Chi Ho	Men's Nine-ball singles	BYE	Fu Jianbo (CHN); L 3-9	did not advance			
Lee Chen Man	Men's Nine-ball singles	BYE	Bashar Hussein (QAT); L 2-9	did not advance			
Marco Fu	Men's Snooker singles	Marlon Manalo (PHI); W 4-1	Soheil Vahedi (IRI); W 4-0	Muhammad Sajjad (PAK); W 4-0	Liang Wenbo (CHN); W 4-1	Aditya Mehta (IND); W 4-1	Ding Junhui (CHN); W 4-2 (gold)
Fung Kwok Wai	Men's Snooker singles	Firas Kamel (IRQ); W 4-2	Lim Chun Kiat (SIN); W 4-0	Khurram Hussain Agha (PAK); W 4-0	Ding Junhui (CHN); L 0-4	did not advance	
Marco Fu; Fung Kwok Wai; Chan Kwok Ming	Men's Snooker team		BYE	Pakistan; L 1-3	did not advance		
Ng On Yee	Women's Six-red snooker singles		BYE	Maliwan Sangklar (THA); W 4-0	Lim Yun-Mi (KOR); W 4-1	Chen Siming (CHN); L 3-4 (bronze)	did not advance
So Man Yan	Women's Six-red snooker singles		BYE	Nicha Pathom-Ekmongkhon (THA); W 4-1	Lai Hui-shan (TPE); L 2-4	did not advance	
Chen Xue; Bi Zhuqing; Chen Siming	Women's Six-red snooker team			BYE	Vietnam; W 3-0	Chinese Taipei; W 3-0	China; W 3-1 (gold)

== Cycling ==
=== BMX ===
Men

Athlete	Event	Qualifying				Final	
Athlete	Event	Run 1	Run 2	Run 3	Points	Time	Rank
Steven Wong	Individual	30.582	31.118	30.739	3 Q	30.337	1st place, gold medalist(s)
Alex John Hunter	Individual	40.673	32.852	32.623	6 Q	32.889	5th

=== Mountain Bike ===
Men

Athlete	Event	Time	Rank
Chan Chun Hing	Cross-country	2:11:33	1st place, gold medalist(s)

=== Road ===
Men

Athlete	Event	Time	Rank
Wong Kam Po	Road race	4:14:54	1st place, gold medalist(s)
Kwok Ho Ting	Road race	4:15:01	20th
Cheung King Lok	Time trial	1:09:23.66	5th

Women

Athlete	Event	Time	Rank
Jamie Wong	Road race	2:47:46	15th
Diao Xiao Juan	Road race	DNF	
Jamie Wong	Time trial	54:40.79	8th

=== Track ===
Sprints

Athlete	Event	Qualifying		1/16 Finals (Repechage)	1/8 Finals (Repechage)	Quarterfinals	Semifinals	Finals/ Classification races	
Athlete	Event	Time Speed	Rank	Opposition Time	Opposition Time	Opposition Time	Opposition Time	Opposition Time	Rank
Lee Wai Sze	Women's sprint	11.418	3rd Q		Jutatip Maneephan (THA); W 12.301	Huang Ting-ying (TPE); W 11.948, W 11.651	Lin Junhong (CHN); L, L	Bronze Medal match: Kim Won-Gyeong (KOR); W 11.808, W 11.804	3rd place, bronze medalist(s)
Meng Zhao Juan	Women's sprint	11.730	8th Q		Kim Won-Gyeong (KOR); L Repechage race: Jutatip Maneephan (THA); Kayono Maeda (JPN); 1st Q 12.417	Guo Shuang (CHN); L, L		Race 5th–8th: Lee Eun-Ji (KOR); Fatehah Mustapa (MAS); Huang Ting-ying (TPE); 3rd	7th

Pursuits

Athlete	Event	Qualifying		1st round		Finals	
Athlete	Event	Time	Rank	Opposition Time	Rank	Opposition Time	Rank
Cheung King Lok	Men's individual pursuit	4:30.858	2nd Q	Wang Mingwei (CHN); W 4:30.931	2nd Q	Jang Sun-Jae (KOR); L 4:37.543	2nd place, silver medalist(s)
Cheung King Wai	Men's individual pursuit	4:44.974	15th	did not advance			
Jamie Wong	Women's individual pursuit	3:50.109	6th	Lee Min-Hye (KOR); L Overlapped	---	did not advance	
Cheung King Lok; Cheung King Wai; Choi Ki Ho; Ko Siu Wai; Kwok Ho Ting; Yeung Ying Hon	Men's team pursuit	4:12.834	1st Q	Kazakhstan; W 4:08.835	2nd	South Korea; L 4:10.859	2nd place, silver medalist(s)

Keirin

Athlete	Event	1st round	Repechage	2nd round	Finals
Athlete	Event	Rank	Rank	Rank	Rank
Yuen Chi Ho	Men's keirin	3rd R	1st Q	6th QB	10th B

Time Trial

Athlete	Event	Time	Rank
Lee Wai Sze	Women's 500 m time trial	33.945	1st place, gold medalist(s)

Points races

Athlete	Event	Qualifying		Final	
Athlete	Event	Points	Rank	Points	Rank
Kwok Ho Ting	Men's points race	26	5th	21	12th
Wong Kam Po	Men's points race	5	7th	60	2nd place, silver medalist(s)
Jamie Wong	Women's points race			27	2nd place, silver medalist(s)
Diao Xiao Juan	Women's points race			DNF	

== Dance Sports ==
Latin

Athlete	Event	Quarterfinal		Semifinal		Final	
Athlete	Event	Points	Rank	Points	Rank	Points	Rank
Lam Wai Yi; Ng Sum Chun	Jive	6.00	5th Q	2.00	8th	did not advance	
Lam Wai Yi; Ng Sum Chun	Cha-cha-cha	8.00	3rd Q	5.00	4th Q	35.57	5th

== Diving ==
=== Men ===
Athlete	Events	Preliminary		Final	
Athlete	Events	Points	Rank	Points	Rank
Jason Poon	Men's 1 m Individual Springboard			324.60	8th
Jason Poon	Men's 3 m Individual Springboard	345.25	11th Q	325.10	11th
Foo Chuen Li	Men's 3 m Individual Springboard	310.25	14th	did not advance	
Jason Poon; Foo Chuen Li	Men's 3 m Synchronised Springboard			325.23	7th

== Dragon boat ==
Men

Team	Event	Heat		Repechage		Final	
Team	Event	Time	Rank	Time	Rank	Time	Rank
Chan Chung Lun Jacky; Chan Wai Ping; Cheung Kwok Pan; Chu Wai Ho; Chung Wai Kit; Fan Koon Shing; Fan Tsz Ho; Fung Wan Him; Ho Chi Shing Chris; Lau Chin Ho; Lau Kin; Leung Chun Kit Alfred; Leung Sau Ching; Leung Tsan; Li Ka Moon; Li Yun Kuen; Lui Kam Chi; Mok Hoi Pang; So Man Kat; Tang Kai Yin; Tsang Sze Ho Sam; Wong Wai Keung; Wong Yiu Cheong; Wu Yiu Chun	250 m	56.451	5th	58.230	4th	did not advance	
Chan Chung Lun Jacky; Chan Wai Ping; Cheung Kwok Pan; Chu Wai Ho; Chung Wai Kit; Fan Koon Shing; Fan Tsz Ho; Fung Wan Him; Ho Chi Shing Chris; Lau Chin Ho; Lau Kin; Leung Chun Kit Alfred; Leung Sau Ching; Leung Tsan; Li Ka Moon; Li Yun Kuen; Lui Kam Chi; Mok Hoi Pang; So Man Kat; Tang Kai Yin; Tsang Sze Ho Sam; Wong Wai Keung; Wong Yiu Cheong; Wu Yiu Chun	500 m	2:05.565	5th	1:58.223	4th	did not advance	

== Equestrian ==
=== Dressage ===
Athlete	Horse	Event	Qualifier		Round A		Round B		Total Round A+B	
Athlete	Horse	Event	Score	Rank	Score	Rank	Score	Rank	Score	Rank
Aram Gregory	Exhilaro	Individual	60.667	19th	62.316	11th	61.200	10th	61.758	11th
Jacqueline Siu	Rocco	Individual	57.056	22nd	60.526	15th	62.550	8th	61.538	12th

=== Eventing ===
Athlete	Horse	Event	Dressage		Cross-country			Jumping					
Athlete	Horse	Event	Dressage		Cross-country			Qualifier			Final		
Athlete	Horse	Event	Penalties	Rank	Penalties	Total	Rank	Penalties	Total	Rank	Penalties	Total	Rank
Nicole Fardel	The Navigator	Individual	53.30	14th	0.00	53.30	12th	0.00	53.30	10th	14.00	67.30	10th
Annie Ho	Undulette	Individual	54.40	17th	0.00	54.40	14th	0.00	54.40	12th	8.00	62.40	8th
Chan Sai Kin	Castell 4	Individual	57.50	19th	0.00	57.50	17th	0.00	57.50	15th	did not advance		
Jennifer Lee	Strong Scotch	Individual	61.90	26th	0.00	61.90	22nd	4.00	65.90	22nd	did not advance		
Nicole Fardel; Annie Ho; Chan Sai Kin; Jennifer Lee	as above	Team	165.20	5th	0.00	165.20	5th	0.00	165.20	4th			

=== Jumping ===
Athlete	Horse	Event	Round 1		Round 2			Individual Final						Jump off	
Athlete	Horse	Event	Round 1		Round 2			Round A		Round B		Total		Jump off	
Athlete	Horse	Event	Penalties	Rank	Penalties	Total	Rank	Penalties	Rank	Penalties	Rank	Penalties	Rank	Jump Time	Rank
Cheng Man Kit	JC Can Do	Individual	0.00	=1st	0.00	0.00	=1st	9.00	=16th	8.00	=12th	17.00	=12th		
Jacqueline Lai	Capone 22	Individual	2.00	=15th	8.00	10.00	19th	19.00	22nd	0.00	=1st	19.00	14th		
Patrick Lam	JC Tilburg	Individual	4.00	=18th	1.00	5.00	12th	did not advance							
Samantha Lam	JC Crunship	Individual	17.00	28th	4.00	21.00	27th	did not advance							
Cheng Man Kit; Jacqueline Lai; Patrick Lam; Samantha Lam	as above	Team	6.00	4th	5.00	11.00	=2nd							24; 137.85	3rd place, bronze medalist(s)

== Fencing ==
=== Men ===
Event	Athlete	Round of Poules		Round of 32	Round of 16	Quarterfinals	Semifinals	Final
Event	Athlete	Result	Seed	Opposition Score	Opposition Score	Opposition Score	Opposition Score	Opposition Score
Tsui Yiu Chung	Individual épée	4 W - 1 L	7th Q	BYE	Shogo Nishida (JPN); L 4-6	did not advance		
Lau Kam Tan	Individual épée	1 W - 4 L	25th	did not advance				
Lau Kam Tan; Leung Ka Ming; Tsui Yiu Chung; Wu Siu Cheung	Team épée				Saudi Arabia; W 45-33	China; L 20-45	did not advance	
Kevin Ngan	Individual foil	4 W - 2 L	9th Q	BYE	Kenta Chida (JPN); W 15-8	Choi Byung-Chul (KOR); L 6-15	did not advance	
Cheung Siu Lun	Individual foil	6 W - 0 L	2nd Q	BYE	Phatthanapong Srisawat (THA); W 15-8	Kwon Young-Ho (KOR); W 15-7	Lei Sheng (CHN); W 15-14	Choi Byung-Chul (KOR); L 14-15 (silver)
Cheung Siu Lun; Chu Wing Hong; Lau Kwok Kin; Kevin Ngan	Team épée				BYE	Kuwait; W 45-27	China; L 21-45 (bronze)	did not advance
Lam Hin Chung	Individual sabre	4 W - 1 L	5th Q	BYE	Wiradech Kothny (THA); W 15-8	Oh Eun-Seok (KOR); L 6-15	did not advance	

=== Women ===
Event	Athlete	Round of Poules		Round of 16	Quarterfinals	Semifinals	Final
Event	Athlete	Result	Seed	Opposition Score	Opposition Score	Opposition Score	Opposition Score
Sabrina Lui	Individual épée	2 W - 4 L	13th Q	Megumi Ikeda (JPN); W 15-6	Luo Xiaojuan (CHN); L 9-15	did not advance	
Yeung Chui Ling	Individual épée	4 W - 1 L	7th Q	Larisa Andreeva (KGZ); W 7-6	Hsu Jo-ting (TPE); W 15-13	Nozomi Nakano (JPN); L 5-6 (bronze)	did not advance
Bjork Cheng; Cheung Sik Lui; Sabrina Lui; Yeung Chui Ling	Team épée			BYE	Kazakhstan; W 25-22	Japan; L 32-36 (bronze)	did not advance
Lin Po Heung	Individual foil	3 W - 2 L	8th Q	Kanae Ikehata (JPN); L 5-15	did not advance		
Cheung Ho King	Individual foil	2 W - 3 L	11th Q	Ruth Ng (SIN); L 3-15	did not advance		
Valerie Cheng; Cheung Ho King; Lau Hiu Wai; Lin Po Heung	Team foil				Singapore; W 45-36	South Korea; L 13-45 (bronze)	did not advance
Au Sin Ying	Individual sabre	5 W - 0 L	3rd Q	Nguyen Thi Thanh Loan (VIE); W 15-8	Zhu Min (CHN); W 15-11	Tan Xue (CHN); W 15-8	Kim Hye-Lim (KOR); L 7-15 (silver)
Au Yeung Wai Sum	Individual sabre	3 W - 2 L	3rd Q	Yuliya Zhivitsa (KAZ); W 15-14	Kim Keum-Hwa (KOR); L 3-15	did not advance	
Au Sin Ying; Au Yeung Wai Sum; Fong Yi Tak; Lam Hin Wai	Team sabre				Japan; W 45-33	China; L 29-45 (bronze)	did not advance

== Football ==
Team

Au Yeung Yiu Chung
Chak Ting Hung
Chan Man Fai
Chan Siu Yuen
Chan Wai Ho
Chao Pengfei
Ju Ying Zhi
Kwok Kin Pong
Lai Man Fei
Lai Yiu Cheong
Lam Hok Hei
Lee Chi Ho
Leung Hing Kit
Lo Kwan Yee
Pak Wing Chak
So Wai Chuen
Tsang Kam To
Xu Deshuai
Yapp Hung Fai
Yuen Kin Man

Pool matches

Group E

Pos	Team	Pld	W	D	L	GF	GA	GD	Pts
1	United Arab Emirates	3	2	1	0	7	1	+6	7
2	Hong Kong	3	2	1	0	6	2	+4	7
3	Uzbekistan	3	1	0	2	3	4	−1	3
4	Bangladesh	3	0	0	3	1	10	−9	0

Source: RSSSF
November 7
19:00

United Arab Emirates	1 – 1	Hong Kong
Mousa 37'	Report	Chan Man Fai 81'

Huadu Stadium, Guangzhou
Referee: Choi Myung-Yong (South Korea)

November 9
19:00

Uzbekistan	0 – 1	Hong Kong
	Report	Chan Wai Ho 60'

Huadu Stadium, Guangzhou
Referee: Kadhum Auda (Iraq)

November 11
16:00

Hong Kong	4 – 1	Bangladesh
Au Yeung Yiu Chung 2', 33'; Ju Yingzhi 41'; Chan Man Fai 87'	Report	E. Hoque 24'

Huadu Stadium, Guangzhou
Referee: Saeid Mozaffarizadeh (Iran)

1/8 finals

November 15
16:00

Oman	3 – 0	Hong Kong
Al-Hadhri 30', 61'; Younis 68'	Report

Huangpu Sports Center, Guangzhou
Referee: Choi Myung-Yong (South Korea)

== Golf ==
Men

Athlete	Event	Round 1	Round 2	Round 3	Round 4	Total	Par	Rank
Hak Shun Yat	Individual	74	67	75	81	297	+9	17th
Chan Chun Hung	Individual	75	80	78	71	304	+16	32nd
Konstantin Liu	Individual	84	73	76	71	304	+16	32nd
Steven Lam	Individual	77	80	84	83	324	+36	50th
Hak Shun Yat; Chan Chun Hung; Konstantin Liu; Steven Lam	Team	226	220	229	223	898	+34	9th

Women

Athlete	Event	Round 1	Round 2	Round 3	Round 4	Total	Par	Rank
Chan Tsz Ching	Individual	78	76	77	79	310	+22	19th
Michelle Cheung	Individual	88	82	78	78	326	+38	25th
Stephanie Ho	Individual	83	80	82	82	327	+39	26th
Chan Tsz Ching; Michelle Cheung; Stephanie Ho	Team	161	156	155	157	629	+53	8th

== Gymnastics ==
=== Artistic gymnastics ===
Men
Individual Qualification & Team all-around Final

Athlete	Apparatus						Individual All-around	
Athlete	Floor	Pommel horse	Rings	Vault	Parallel bars	Horizontal bar	Total	Rank
Ng Kiu Chung	12.400	10.100	13.500	15.650	12.450	10.800	74.900 Q	32nd
Shek Wai Hung	13.450	12.200	13.050	16.050 Q	14.450	14.250	83.450 Q	11th
Zhong Jian								

Individual

Athlete	Event	Final							
Athlete	Event	Floor	Pommel Horse	Rings	Vault	Parallel Bars	Horizontal Bar	Total	Rank
Shek Wai Hung	Individual all-around	14.150	13.100	13.050	16.000	14.800	13.350	84.450	8th
Shek Wai Hung	Vault				15.425			15.425	6th
Ng Kiu Chung	Individual all-around	13.150	11.450	14.250	14.400	11.950	10.450	75.650	20th

Women
Individual Qualification & Team all-around Final

Athlete	Apparatus				Individual All-around	
Athlete	Vault	Uneven bars	Balance beam	Floor	Total	Rank
Angel Wong	13.400 Q	10.600	12.450	11.050	47.500 Q	19th

Individual

Athlete	Event	Final					
Athlete	Event	Vault	Uneven bars	Balance beam	Floor	Total	Rank
Angel Wong	Individual all-around	14.050	10.800	11.150	12.700	48.700	11th
Angel Wong	Vault	13.712				13.712	6th

== Handball ==
Team

Chan Wan Man
Cheng Chun Wing
Ho Wai Kit
Hui Man Pong
Ip Kwun Ying Addy
Ip Shi Yan
Jia Dongjin
Koon Lap Kei
Leung Chi Sai
Leung Hoi Yip
Lin Ming Fai
Ng Yue Kiu
Tse Wai Hei
Wong Ka Yu
Wong Shing Yip
Yiu Tai Wai

Preliminary round

- In men, Hong Kong team is in group B. Its competitors are South Korea, Iran, Bahrain and Bahrain.

Pos	Team	Pld	W	D	L	GF	GA	GD	Pts	Qualification
1	South Korea	4	4	0	0	149	98	+51	8	Semifinals
2	Iran	4	3	0	1	127	95	+32	6	Semifinals
3	Bahrain	4	2	0	2	118	111	+7	4	Placement 5th–6th
4	Athletes from Kuwait	4	1	0	3	126	111	+15	2	Placement 7th–8th
5	Hong Kong	4	0	0	4	67	172	−105	0	Placement 9th–10th

Source: Results

November 13; 15:45	South Korea	52 – 13	Hong Kong	Guanggong Gymnasium, Guangzhou; Referees: Liu, Chang (TPE)
November 13; 15:45	Jeong Y.K., Kim T.W. 7	(22–5)	Lin M.F. 4	Guanggong Gymnasium, Guangzhou; Referees: Liu, Chang (TPE)
November 13; 15:45	1× (yellow card)	Report	2× (yellow card) 1× (suspension)	Guanggong Gymnasium, Guangzhou; Referees: Liu, Chang (TPE)

November 14; 14:00	Iran	35 – 13	Hong Kong	Guanggong Gymnasium, Guangzhou; Referees: Fukushima, Ienaga (JPN)
November 14; 14:00	4 Players 5	(15–7)	Yiu T.W., Hui M.P., Ip S.Y. 2	Guanggong Gymnasium, Guangzhou; Referees: Fukushima, Ienaga (JPN)
November 14; 14:00	2× (yellow card)	Report	1× (yellow card) 3× (suspension)	Guanggong Gymnasium, Guangzhou; Referees: Fukushima, Ienaga (JPN)

November 17; 14:00	Kuwait	45 – 21	Hong Kong	Guanggong Gymnasium, Guangzhou; Referees: Fukushima, Ienaga (JPN)
November 17; 14:00	Jafar, Al-Haidari 7	(25–9)	Ip S.Y. 7	Guanggong Gymnasium, Guangzhou; Referees: Fukushima, Ienaga (JPN)
November 17; 14:00	2× (yellow card) 1× (suspension)	Report	3× (yellow card) 2× (suspension)	Guanggong Gymnasium, Guangzhou; Referees: Fukushima, Ienaga (JPN)

November 19; 14:00	Bahrain	40 – 20	Hong Kong	Guanggong Gymnasium, Guangzhou; Referees: Hizaki, Ikebuchi (JPN)
November 19; 14:00	Al-Wanna 8	(18–9)	Hui M.P. 5	Guanggong Gymnasium, Guangzhou; Referees: Hizaki, Ikebuchi (JPN)
November 19; 14:00	2× (yellow card) 1× (suspension)	Report	2× (yellow card) 2× (suspension)	Guanggong Gymnasium, Guangzhou; Referees: Hizaki, Ikebuchi (JPN)

Placement 9th–10th

November 22; 18:00	India	34 – 29	Hong Kong	Huashi Gymnasium, Guangzhou; Referees: Chang, Liu (TPE)
November 22; 18:00	N. Singh 13	(17–16)	Ip S.Y. 7	Huashi Gymnasium, Guangzhou; Referees: Chang, Liu (TPE)
November 22; 18:00	1× (yellow card) 4× (suspension)	Report	3× (yellow card) 7× (suspension)	Huashi Gymnasium, Guangzhou; Referees: Chang, Liu (TPE)

== Hockey ==
Team

Akbar Ali
Ali Asif
Arifali
Ashgar Ali
Bal Harinder Singh
Chan Ka Ho
Chhina Jasbir Singh
Dillon Aman Singh
Dillon Dev Singh
Inderpal Singh
Leung Hong Wang Howard
Mohammed Mustafa
Mohammed Swalikh
Rashid Mehmood Raja
Kieran Thomas Sturrock Smith
Zakir Muhammad Noman

Preliminary

- In men, Hong Kong team is in pool B.

Team	Pld	W	D	L	GF	GA	GD	Pts
India	4	4	0	0	22	4	+18	12
Pakistan	4	3	0	1	28	6	+22	9
Japan	4	2	0	2	13	13	0	6
Bangladesh	4	1	0	3	9	21	–12	3
Hong Kong	4	0	0	4	4	32	–28	0

15 November 2010
14:30

India	7 – 0	Hong Kong
Chikara 2'; Sandeep 4' 18'; Sarvanjit 22'; Khandker 37'; Halappa 38'; Shivendra 49'	Report

Umpires:
Jang Jung-Min (KOR)
Lim Hong Zhen (SIN)

17 November 2010
15:00

Pakistan	12 – 0	Hong Kong
Butt 2' 58'; Abbas 8' 29'; Ahmed 22'; Waqas 24' 50' 53'; Haseem Khan 31' 55'; Imran 35' 61'	Report

Umpires:
Thani Saheen Al Wahabi (OMA)
John Hrytsak (CAN)

18 November 2010
15:30

Bangladesh	7 – 3	Hong Kong
Mahamud 16' 54'; Chayan 21' 35' 38' 46'; Alam 52'	Report	Asghar 14'; Arifali 27' 69'

Umpires:
Simon Taylor (NZL)
Thani Saheen Al Wahabi (MAS)

20 November 2010
13:00

Hong Kong	1 – 6	Japan
Arifali 46'	Report	Kitazato 18' 61' 70'; Mitani 33'; Sakamoto 44'; Yamabori 63'

Umpires:
John Hrytsak (CAN)
Jang Jung-Min (KOR)

Ninth and tenth place

25 November 2010
09:00

Singapore	1 – 2 (a.e.t.)	Hong Kong
Enrico 51'	Report	Arifali 35' 81'

Umpires:
Virender Singh (IND)
Ilanggo Kanabathu (MAS)

== Judo ==
=== Men ===
Athlete	Event	Preliminary	Round of 16	Quarterfinals	Final of table	Final
Athlete	Event	Opposition Result	Opposition Result	Opposition Result	Opposition Result	Opposition Result
Yu Kin Ting	-60 kg	Navjot Chana (IND); L 000-120	did not advance			
Cheung Chi Yip	-73 kg	Khalifa Al-Qubaisi (UAE); L 000-002	did not advance			

== Karate ==
=== Men ===
Athlete	Event	1/16 Finals	1/8 Finals	Quarterfinals	Semifinals	Finals
Athlete	Event	Opposition Result	Opposition Result	Opposition Result	Opposition Result	Opposition Result
Chris Cheng	Individual Kata		Ku Jin Keat (MAS); L 0-5	Did not advance	Repechage 1 match: Dmitrii Kazanov (KGZ); W 5-0	Bronze medal match: Faisal Zainuddin (INA); L 1-4
Cheung Kwan Lok	Kumite -60kg	Bashar Al-Najjar (JOR); L 2-5	Did not advance	Repechage 1 match: Donny Dharmawan (INA); L 3-4	did not advance	
Yuen Siu Lun	Kumite -67kg	Sufian Al-Malayeen (JOR); L Hantei	did not advance			
Lee Ka Wai	Kumite -75kg	BYE	Naowras Al-Hamwi (SYR); W 4-0	Mainuddin Hj Mohammad (BRU); W WO	Hamad Al-Nweam (KUW); L 3-4	Bronze medal match: Saman Faiq (IRQ); W 7-2 (bronze)

=== Women ===
Athlete	Event	1/8 Finals	Quarterfinals	Semifinals	Finals
Athlete	Event	Opposition Result	Opposition Result	Opposition Result	Opposition Result
Li Pui Ki	Individual Kata	Ramilia Eshmambetova (KGZ); W 5-0	Huang Yu-chi (TPE); L 0-5	Repechage 1 match: Thaviphone Salichanh (LAO); W 5-0	Bronze medal match: Cheung Pui Si (MAC); L 0-5
Chan Ka Man	Kumite -61kg	Nahid Behrooz (AFG); W 5-0	Yamini Gopalasamy (MAS); L 0-2	Repechage 1 match: BYE	Bronze medal match: Chang Ting (TPE); W 3-0 (bronze)

== Rowing ==
Men

Athlete	Event	Heats		Repechage		Final	
Athlete	Event	Time	Rank	Time	Rank	Time	Rank
Law Hiu Fung	Single Sculls	7:09.19	3rd R	7:12.56	1st F	7:13.95	5th
Law Hiu Fung; Lok Kwan Hoi	Double Sculls	6:59.22	6th F	auto advancement		6:36.06	4th
Lok Kwan Hoi	Lightweight Single Sculls	7:15.33	2nd R	7:17.09	1st F	7:07.44	4th
Chow Kwong Wing; So Sau Wah	Lightweight Double Sculls	6:35.33	1st F	auto advancement		6:34.50	2nd place, silver medalist(s)
Kwan Ki Cheong; Leung Chun Shek; Liao Shun Yin; Tang Chiu Mang	Lightweight Coxless Four	6:19.00	4th F	auto advancement		6:14.84	3rd place, bronze medalist(s)

Women

Athlete	Event	Heats		Repechage		Final	
Athlete	Event	Time	Rank	Time	Rank	Time	Rank
Lee Ka Man	Lightweight Single Sculls	7:55.19	1st F	auto advancement		7:58.65	5th
Chan Tsz Wai; Cheung Lai Yin; Lee Yuen Yin; Tong Siu Man	Lightweight Quadruple Sculls	6:59.53	4th F	auto advancement		7:02.02	5th

== Rugby Union ==
=== Men ===
Team

Simon Leung
Kwok Ka Chun
Mark Wright
Anthony Haynes
Tsang Hing Hung
Jamie Hood
Fan Shun Kei
Edward Haynes
Rowan Varty
Keith Robertson
Sebastian Perkins
Yiu Kam Shing

- In men, Hong Kong is in pool A.

Team	Pld	W	D	L	PF	PA	+/-	Pts
Japan	4	4	0	0	136	12	+124	12
Hong Kong	4	3	0	1	128	39	+89	10
Malaysia	4	2	0	2	68	76	−8	8
Thailand	4	1	0	3	76	86	−10	6
Mongolia	4	0	0	4	0	195	−195	4

November 21
15:44

Hong Kong	38 – 10	Malaysia

Guangzhou University City Stadium, Guangzhou

November 22
09:23

Hong Kong	24 – 5	Thailand

Guangzhou University City Stadium, Guangzhou

November 22
13:00

Hong Kong	59 – 0	Mongolia

Guangzhou University City Stadium, Guangzhou

November 22
16:09

Japan	24 – 7	Hong Kong

Guangzhou University City Stadium, Guangzhou

Quarterfinals

November 23
11:46

Hong Kong	19 – 14	Sri Lanka

Guangzhou University City Stadium, Guangzhou

Semifinals

November 23
14:55

China	14 – 19	Hong Kong

Guangzhou University City Stadium, Guangzhou

Final

November 23
18:18

Japan	28 – 21	Hong Kong

Guangzhou University City Stadium, Guangzhou

Final standing

Rank	Team
Silver medal	Hong Kong

=== Women ===
Team

Chan Ho Ting
Chan Ho Ting
Chan Leong Sze
Cheng Ka Chi
Cheng Tsz Ting
Stephanie Cuvelier
Lai Pou Fan
Lau Sin Tung
Poon Pak Yan
Samantha Scott
Sham Wai Sum
Lindsay Varty

- In woman, Hong Kong is in pool A.

Team	Pld	W	D	L	PF	PA	+/-	Pts
China	3	3	0	0	116	0	+116	9
Thailand	3	2	0	1	65	50	+15	7
Hong Kong	3	1	0	2	50	46	−4	5
South Korea	3	0	0	3	0	135	−135	3

November 21
14:53

Thailand	17 – 14	Hong Kong

Guangzhou University City Stadium, Guangzhou

November 22
11:46

China	29 – 0	Hong Kong

Guangzhou University City Stadium, Guangzhou

November 22
15:00

Hong Kong	36 – 0	South Korea

Guangzhou University City Stadium, Guangzhou

Quarterfinals

November 23
09:23

Japan	14 – 19	Hong Kong

Guangzhou University City Stadium, Guangzhou

Semifinals

November 23
12:55

China	34 – 0	Hong Kong

Guangzhou University City Stadium, Guangzhou

Bronze medal match

November 23
16:55

Hong Kong	12 – 17	Thailand

Guangzhou University City Stadium, Guangzhou

Final standing

Rank	Team
4	Hong Kong

== Sailing ==
=== Men ===
Athlete	Event	Race												Net Points	Final Rank
Athlete	Event	1	2	3	4	5	6	7	8	9	10	11	12	Net Points	Final Rank
Chan King Yin	Mistral One Design Class	1	(5)	2	3	3	2	1	2	2	1	1	1	19	1st place, gold medalist(s)
Cheng Kwok Fai	RS:X	4	4	(5)	5	4	3	3	4	3	1	4	4	39	5th
Kwan Wing Ho; Bernard Kay	Double Handed Dinghy 420	5	(9)	4	5	6	6	7	4	5	7	7	7	63	7th

=== Women ===
Athlete	Event	Race												Net Points	Final Rank
Athlete	Event	1	2	3	4	5	6	7	8	9	10	11	12	Net Points	Final Rank
Hayley Chan	Mistral One Design Class	1	(3)	2	2	2	2	3	1	2	3	2	1	21	2nd place, silver medalist(s)
Chan Wai Kei	RS:X	(2)	2	2	2	1	2	2	2	2	1	2	1	19	2nd place, silver medalist(s)

=== Open ===
Athlete	Event	Race												Net Points	Final Rank
Athlete	Event	1	2	3	4	5	6	7	8	9	10	11	12	Net Points	Final Rank
Tong Yui Shing; Tong Kit Fong	Hobie-16	5	6	4	4	4	4	5	4	(8)	5	4	5	50	5th

== Shooting ==
Men

Event	Athlete	Qualification		Final	
Event	Athlete	Score	Rank	Score	Rank
Men's 10 m air pistol	Wong Fai	580-21x	6th Q	678.1	7th
Men's 25 m standard pistol	Wong Fai			559-14x	17th
Men's 25 m standard pistol	Yang Joe Tsi			544- 7x	31st
Men's 25 m standard pistol	Li Hao Jian			543- 9x	32nd
Men's 25 m standard pistol team	Wong Fai; Yang Joe Tsi; Li Hao Jian			1646-30x	9th
Men's 25 m center fire pistol	Wong Fai			567-12x	30th
Men's 25 m center fire pistol	Li Hao Jian			573-16x	22nd
Men's 25 m center fire pistol	Yang Joe Tsi			561- 8x	33rd
Men's 25 m center fire pistol team	Wong Fai; Li Hao Jian; Yang Joe Tsi			1701-36x	10th
Men's 25 m rapid fire pistol	Wong Fai	571-12x	13th	did not advance	
Men's 25 m rapid fire pistol	Li Hao Jian	571-10x	14th	did not advance	

Women

Event	Athlete	Qualification		Final	
Event	Athlete	Score	Rank	Score	Rank
Women's 10 m air pistol	Li Mei Wun	365- 8x	42nd	did not advance	

== Squash ==
Athlete	Event	1st Round	2nd Round	Quarterfinals	Semifinals	Final
Athlete	Event	Opposition Result	Opposition Result	Opposition Result	Opposition Result	Opposition Result
Dick Lau	Men's singles	Niyf Abu-Reqah (KSA); W 3-0 (11-2, 11-1, 11-6)	Siddharth Suchde (IND); L 1-3 (11-9, 4-11, 6-11, 4-11)	did not advance		
Lee Ho Yin	Men's singles	BYE	Meng Xiaomin (CHN); W 3-0 (11-3, 11-3, 11-3)	Mohd Azlan Iskandar (MAS); L 1-3 (11-3, 5-11, 4-11, 6-11)	did not advance	
Joey Chan	Women's singles		Saima Shaukat (PAK); W 3-0 (11-2, 11-3, 11-3)	Song Sun-mi (KOR); W 3-0 (11-6, 11-5, 11-2)	Annie Au (HKG); L 1-3 (7-11, 11-2, 9-11, 9-11) (bronze)	did not advance
Annie Au	Women's singles		Maria Toor Pakay (PAK); W 3-0 (11-7, 11-8, 11-3)	Misaki Kobayashi (JPN); W 3-1 (11-3, 11-8, 10-12, 11-6)	Joey Chan (HKG); W 3-1 (11-7, 2-11, 11-9, 11-9)	Nicol David (MAS); L 1-3 (8-11, 11-8, 6-11, 7-11) (silver)

Athlete	Event	Pool Summary				Semifinals	Final
Athlete	Event	Contest 1	Contest 2	Contest 3	Contest 4	Semifinals	Final
Athlete	Event	Opposition Result	Opposition Result	Opposition Result	Opposition Result	Opposition Result	Opposition Result
Au Chun Ming; Kwong Yu Shun; Dick Lau; Lee Ho Yin	Men's Team	Sri Lanka (SRI); W 3-0 (3-0, 3-0, 3-0)	Kuwait (KUW); W 2-1 (3-0, 0-3, 3-0)	China (CHN); W 3-0 (3-0, 3-0, 3-0)	Pakistan (PAK); L 0-3 (0-3, 1-3, 1-3)	Malaysia (MAS); L 0-2 (2-3, 0-3) (bronze)	did not advance
Annie Au; Joey Chan; Chiu Wing Yin; Liu Tsz Ling	Women's Team	Pakistan (PAK); W 3-0 (3-0, 3-0, 3-0)	China (CHN); W 3-0 (3-0, 3-0, 3-0)	India (IND); W 3-0 (3-1, 3-0, 3-1)		South Korea (KOR); W 2-0 (3-0, 3-0)	Malaysia (MAS); L 0-2 (1-3, 0-3) (silver)

== Swimming ==
Men

Event	Athletes	Heat		Final	
Event	Athletes	Time	Rank	Time	Rank
50 m freestyle	Lum Ching Tat	23.16	7th Q	23.15	7th
50 m freestyle	Yan Ho Chun	23.74	15th	did not advance	
100 m freestyle	Wong Kai Wai David	50.91	8th Q	50.89	8th
100 m freestyle	Lum Ching Tat	51.27	14th	did not advance	
200 m freestyle	Cheung Kin Tat Kent	1:55.03	18th	did not advance	
200 m freestyle	Kong Chun Yin	1:56.51	21st	did not advance	
400 m freestyle	Cheung Kin Tat Kent	4:17.72	22nd	did not advance	
400 m freestyle	Cheung Siu Hang	4:19.36	23rd	did not advance	
50 m backstroke	Chung Lai Yeung	26.84	12th	did not advance	
100 m backstroke	Chung Lai Yeung	58.10	13th	did not advance	
100 m backstroke	Chu Kevin Kam Yin	1:00.04	20th	did not advance	
200 m backstroke	Chu Kevin Kam Yin	2:09.31	16th	did not advance	
50 m breaststroke	Wong Chun Yan	28.50	6th Q	28.53	7th
50 m breaststroke	Chan Wing Lim Eric	29.92	21st	did not advance	
100 m breaststroke	Wong Chun Yan	1:04.41	14th	did not advance	
100 m breaststroke	Chan Wing Lim Eric	1:05.54	22nd	did not advance	
50 m butterfly	Yan Ho Chun	25.81	16th	did not advance	
50 m butterfly	Ng Chun Nam Derick	26.02	19th	did not advance	
100 m butterfly	Wong Kai Wai David	54.76	10th	did not advance	
100 m butterfly	Ng Chun Nam Derick	56.35	15th	did not advance	
200 m individual medley	Chu Kevin Kam Yin	2:11.70	18th	did not advance	
200 m individual medley	Cheung Siu Hang	2:13.26	21st	did not advance	
400 m individual medley	Chu Kevin Kam Yin	4:36.64	12th	did not advance	
4×100 m freestyle	Wong Kai Wai David; Ng Chun Nam Derick; Cheung Kin Tat Kent; Lum Ching Tat	3:25.27	5th Q	3:24.55	5th
4×200 m freestyle	Wong Kai Wai David; Ng Chun Nam Derick; Cheung Kin Tat Kent; Kong Chun Yin	7:35.68	6th Q	7:31.44	5th
4×100 m medley	Chung Lai Yeung; Wong Kai Wai David; Wong Chun Yan; Kong Chun Yin	3:50.09	10th	did not advance	

Women

Event	Athletes	Heat		Final	
Event	Athletes	Time	Rank	Time	Rank
50 m freestyle	Hannah Wilson	25.84	4th Q	25.73	4th
50 m freestyle	Sze Hang Yu	26.15	6th Q	26.06	6th
100 m freestyle	Hannah Wilson	55.59	3rd Q	55.33	4th
100 m freestyle	Yu Wai Ting	57.84	10th	did not advance	
200 m freestyle	Au Hoishun Stephanie	2:05.05	11th	did not advance	
200 m freestyle	Town Jennifer Ka Hang	2:06.46	12th	did not advance	
400 m freestyle	Natasha Tang	4:22.63	9th	did not advance	
400 m freestyle	Au Hoishun Stephanie	4:24.33	11th	did not advance	
800 m freestyle	Nam Carmen			9:01.93	9th
800 m freestyle	Natasha Tang			9:05.37	11th
50 m backstroke	Lau Yin Yan Claudia	29.53	7th Q	29.33	8th
100 m backstroke	Lau Yin Yan Claudia	1:03.49	5th Q	1:02.60	5th
200 m backstroke	Lau Yin Yan Claudia	2:16.23	6th Q	2:14.86	6th
50 m breaststroke	Kong Yvette Man Yi	32.92	6th Q	32.68	6th
50 m breaststroke	Fiona Ma	33.17	9th	did not advance	
100 m breaststroke	Kong Yvette Man Yi	1:12.12	8th Q	1:12.41	8th
100 m breaststroke	Fiona Ma	1:13.00	10th	did not advance	
200 m breaststroke	Kong Yvette Man Yi	2:36.75	7th Q	2:35.73	7th
200 m breaststroke	Fiona Ma	2:39.08	11th	did not advance	
50 m butterfly	Sze Hang Yu	27.19	5th Q	26.91	5th
50 m butterfly	Hannah Wilson	27.25	6th Q	26.97	6th
100 m butterfly	Sze Hang Yu	59.52	6th Q	1:05.27	8th
100 m butterfly	Hannah Wilson	59.40	3rd Q	59.26	4th
200 m butterfly	Nam Carmen	2:18.48	11th	did not advance	
200 m butterfly	Town Jennifer Ka Hang	2:20.97	12th	did not advance	
200 m individual medley	Kong Yvette Man Yi	2:26.52	12th	did not advance	
400 m individual medley	Nam Carmen	5:05.27	10th	did not advance	
4×100 m freestyle	Sze Hang Yu; Yu Wai Ting; Au Hoishun Stephanie; Hannah Wilson			3:43.17	3rd place, bronze medalist(s)
4×200 m freestyle	Sze Hang Yu; Yu Wai Ting; Town Jennifer Ka Hang; Hannah Wilson			8:08.11	4th
4×100 m medley	Lau Yin Yan Claudia; Fiona Ma; Sze Hang Yu; Hannah Wilson			4:06.83	3rd place, bronze medalist(s)

== Table Tennis ==
Athlete	Event	Round of 64	Round of 32	Round of 16	Quarterfinals	Semifinals	Final
Athlete	Event	Opposition Result	Opposition Result	Opposition Result	Opposition Result	Opposition Result	Opposition Result
Tang Peng	Men's singles	BYE	Rachid El-Boubou (LIB); W WO	Kim Hyok-Bong (PRK); W 4-3 (10-12, 15-13, 9-11, 11-9, 7-11, 11-8, 11-4)	Joo Se-Hyuk (KOR); L 0-4 (3-11, 5-11, 9-11, 3-11)	did not advance	
Li Ching	Men's singles	BYE	Ahmed Al-Mohannadi (QAT); W 4-0 (11-3, 11-9, 11-9, 11-4)	Jun Mizutani (JPN); L 2-4 (7-11, 5-11, 11-7, 4-11, 11-6, 8-11)	did not advance		
Cheung Yuk; Li Ching	Men's Doubles		Amalraj Anthony (IND) and Soumyadeep Roy (IND); W 3-0 (11-5, 11-5, 11-7)	Kim Nam-Chol (PRK) and Ri Chol-Guk (PRK); W 3-0 (11-8, 13-11, 11-5)	Wang Hao (CHN) and Zhang Jike (CHN); L 0-3 (7-11, 7-11, 7-11)	did not advance	
Jiang Tianyi; Tang Peng	Men's Doubles		Purshottam Bajracharya (NEP) and Ranjit Singh Rayamajhi (NEP); W 3-0 (11-4, 11-7, 11-8)	Kenta Matsudaira (JPN) and Koki Niwa (JPN); L 0-3 (10-12, 6-11, 8-11)	did not advance		
Tie Ya Na	Women's singles	BYE	Souha Annos (SYR); W 4-0 (11-4, 11-6, 11-7, 11-1)	Sayaka Hirano (JPN); L 0-4 (8-11, 5-11, 6-11, 10-12)	did not advance		
Jiang Huajun	Women's singles	BYE	Ishara Madurangi (SRI); W 4-0 (11-2, 11-3, 11-5, 11-2)	Beh Lee Wei (MAS); W 4-0 (11-7, 11-3, 11-6, 11-8)	Guo Yue (CHN); L 0-4 (10-12, 11-13, 8-11, 8-11)	did not advance	
Lin Ling; Zhang Rui	Women's Doubles		Nodira Burkhankhodjaeva (UZB) and Olga Kim (UZB); W WO	Kim Kyung-Ah (KOR) and Park Mi-Young (KOR); L 2-3 (8-11, 11-9, 7-11, 11-8, 1-11)	did not advance		
Tie Ya Na; Jiang Huajun	Women's Doubles		Hiroko Fujii (JPN) and Misako Wakamiya (JPN); L 2-3 (11-4, 9-11, 9-11, 11-6, 11-13)	did not advance			
Tang Peng; Tie Ya Na	Mixed Doubles		Yang Zi (SIN) and Wang Yuegu (SIN); W 3-2 (8-11, 11-6, 5-11, 11-9, 11-7)	Yahya Mossly (SYR) and Souha Annos (SYR); W 3-0 (11-5, 11-3, 11-5)	Xu Xin (CHN) and Guo Yan (CHN); L 1-3 (13-11, 7-11, 4-11, 12-14)	did not advance	
Cheung Yuk; Jiang Huajun	Mixed Doubles		Inom Saidov (TJK) and Sumayai Amiri (TJK); W 3-0 (11-4, 11-4, 11-5)	Mohd Shakirin Ibrahim (MAS) and Beh Lee Wei (MAS); W 3-0 (11-5, 11-6, 11-7)	Zhang Jike (CHN) and Ding Ning (CHN); W 3-2 (6-11, 12-10, 11-7, 7-11, 11-7)	Seiya Kishikawa (JPN) and Ai Fukuhara (JPN); W 4-3 (11-6, 11-5, 5-11, 11-3, 2-11, 12-14, 11-9)	Xu Xin (CHN) and Guo Yan (CHN); L 1-4 (13-15, 8-11, 11-7, 8-11, 3-11) (silver)

Athlete	Event	Pool Summary			Quarterfinals	Semifinals	Final
Athlete	Event	Contest 1	Contest 2	Contest 3	Quarterfinals	Semifinals	Final
Athlete	Event	Opposition Result	Opposition Result	Opposition Result	Opposition Result	Opposition Result	
Cheung Yuk; Li Ching; Jiang Tianyi; Tang Peng; Ko Lai Chak	Men's Team	Iran (IRI); W 3-0 (3-0, 3-2, 3-0)	Japan (JPN); L 2-3 (3-1, 0-3, 3-1, 2-3, 2-3)	Nepal (NEP); W 3-0 (3-0, 3-2, 3-2)	South Korea (KOR); L 0-3 (2-3, 1-3, 2-3)	did not advance	
Lin Ling; Zhang Rui; Tie Ya Na; Jiang Huajun; April Yu	Women's Team	Qatar (QAT); W 3-0 (3-0, 3-0, 3-0)	South Korea (KOR); L 2-3 (3-2, 1-3, 0-3, 3-1, 1-3)	Malaysia (MAS); W 3-0 (3-0, 3-0, 3-0)	North Korea (PRK); L 1-3 (1-3, 2-3, 3-1, 1-3)	did not advance	

== Taekwondo ==
=== Men ===
Athlete	Event	Round of 32	Round of 16	Quarterfinals	Semifinals	Final
Athlete	Event	Opposition Result	Opposition Result	Opposition Result	Opposition Result	Opposition Result
Poon Chun Ho	Bantamweight (-63kg)	Orazgeldy Orazgeldiyev (TKM); W PTS 13-0	Darkhan Kassymkulov (KAZ); L PTS 0-3	did not advance		

== Tennis ==
Athlete	Event	Round of 64	Round of 32	Round of 16	Quarterfinals	Semifinals	Final
Athlete	Event	Opposition Result	Opposition Result	Opposition Result	Opposition Result	Opposition Result	Opposition Result
Martin Sayer	Men's singles	BYE	Cecil Mamiit (PHI); L 5-7, 5-7	did not advance			
Yu Hiu-tung	Men's singles	BYE	Danai Udomchoke (THA); L 3-6, 2-6	did not advance			
Jack Hui; Michael Lai	Men's doubles		Karan Rastogi (IND) and Vishnu Vardhan (IND); L 1-6, 3-6	did not advance			
Jack Hui; Michael Lai; Yu Hiu-tung; Martin Sayer	Men's team		BYE	Japan (JPN); L 0-3 (1-2, 0-2, 0-2)	did not advance		
Zhang Ling	Women's singles		Anastasiya Prenko (TKM); W 6-1, 6-2	Kimiko Date-Krumm (JPN); L 3-6, 3-6	did not advance		
Venise Chan	Women's singles		Sania Mirza (IND); L 1-6, 0-6	did not advance			
Zhang Ling; Venise Chan	Women's team			BYE	Kyrgyzstan (KGZ); L 1-2 (1-2, 2-0, 1-2)	did not advance	
Zhang Ling; Martin Sayer	Mixed doubles		BYE	Misaki Doi (JPN) and Takao Suzuki (JPN); L 4-6, 4-6	did not advance		
Venise Chan; Jack Hui	Mixed doubles		Ksenia Palkina (KGZ) and Daniiar Duldaebv (KGZ); L 6-3, 2-6, [4-10]	did not advance			

== Triathlon ==
Athlete	Event	Swim (1.5 km)	Trans 1	Bike (40 km)	Trans 2	Run (10 km)	Total	Rank
Andrew James Wright	Men's Individual	19:06; 6th	1:06; 9th	1:00:02; 5th	0:42; 9th	33:46; 8th	1:54:45.47	7th
Daniel Lee	Men's Individual	19:16; 11th	1:01; 1st	59:57; 3rd	0:41; 7th	33:49; 9th	1:54:46.29	8th

== Volleyball ==
=== Men ===
Team

Chan Chi Wai
Chan Kam Yin
Cheng Chun Man
Chung Wai Wing
Fok Shu Wing
Hui Pui Tak
Keung Chun Keung
Ko Yiu Hung
Kwok Chung Kan
Kwong Ngai Shing
Wong Ka Wai
Yu Hing Lung

Preliminary

- In boys' team, Hong Kong is in group D.

Group D

Pos	Team	Pld	W	L	Pts	SPW	SPL	SPR	SW	SL	SR
1	Japan	4	4	0	8	307	186	1.651	12	0	MAX
2	Qatar	4	3	1	7	323	277	1.166	9	5	1.800
3	Athletes from Kuwait	4	2	2	6	314	312	1.006	8	7	1.143
4	Myanmar	4	1	3	5	238	299	0.796	4	9	0.444
5	Hong Kong	4	0	4	4	192	300	0.640	0	12	0.000

Source: Results

Date		Score		Set 1	Set 2	Set 3	Set 4	Set 5	Total
13 Nov	Myanmar	3–0	Hong Kong	25–21	25–17	25–13			75–51
14 Nov	Hong Kong	0–3	Kuwait	17–25	18–25	16–25			51–75
15 Nov	Qatar	3–0	Hong Kong	25–17	25–19	25–15			75–51
17 Nov	Hong Kong	0–3	Japan	11–25	16–25	12–25			39–75

== Water polo ==
=== Men ===
Team

Chan Sze Ho
Kelvin Cheng
Cheng Ka Long
Cheung Hok Him
Michael Cheung
Chung Kwok Leung
Fong Ho Cheung
Koo Yu Fat
Ku Yat Wa
Lee Kwan Shing
Po Yue Kai
Toby To
Zhao Jinwen

Preliminary

Group A

- In men's tournament, Hong Kong team is in group A.

Pos	Team	Pld	W	D	L	GF	GA	GD	Pts	Qualification
1	Japan	4	4	0	0	72	16	+56	8	Quarterfinals
2	China	4	3	0	1	72	16	+56	6	Quarterfinals
3	South Korea	4	2	0	2	54	33	+21	4	Quarterfinals
4	Hong Kong	4	1	0	3	33	73	−40	2	Quarterfinals
5	Qatar	4	0	0	4	5	98	−93	0	

Source: Results

November 18; 14:30	Report	South Korea	18–5	Hong Kong	Tianhe Natatorium, Tianhe; Referees: Tan (SIN), Al Saad (KUW)
November 18; 14:30	Report	Score by quarters: 4–2, 3–0, 6–2, 5–1			Tianhe Natatorium, Tianhe; Referees: Tan (SIN), Al Saad (KUW)
November 18; 14:30	Report	Kang Junwon 4	Goals	Zhao Jinwen 2	Tianhe Natatorium, Tianhe; Referees: Tan (SIN), Al Saad (KUW)

November 19; 15:55	Report	Hong Kong	6–24	China	Tianhe Natatorium, Tianhe; Referees: Tan (SIN), Al Saad (KUW)
November 19; 15:55	Report	Score by quarters: 1–8, 1–6, 3–5, 1–5			Tianhe Natatorium, Tianhe; Referees: Tan (SIN), Al Saad (KUW)
November 19; 15:55	Report	Cheng Ka Ki Kelvin 2	Goals	Jiang Bin 5	Tianhe Natatorium, Tianhe; Referees: Tan (SIN), Al Saad (KUW)

November 20; 09:00	Report	Japan	30–1	Hong Kong	Tianhe Natatorium, Tianhe; Referees: Salnichenko (KAZ), Bock (GER)
November 20; 09:00	Report	Score by quarters: 5–1, 10–0, 7–0, 8–0			Tianhe Natatorium, Tianhe; Referees: Salnichenko (KAZ), Bock (GER)
November 20; 09:00	Report	Aoyagi 5	Goals	Chung Kwok Leung 1	Tianhe Natatorium, Tianhe; Referees: Salnichenko (KAZ), Bock (GER)

November 22; 14:30	Report	Qatar	1–21	Hong Kong	Tianhe Natatorium, Tianhe; Referees: Margeta (SLO), Bock (GER)
November 22; 14:30	Report	Score by quarters: 1–5, 0–3, 0–7, 0–6			Tianhe Natatorium, Tianhe; Referees: Margeta (SLO), Bock (GER)
November 22; 14:30	Report	Al Sulaiti 1	Goals	Zhao Jinwen 6	Tianhe Natatorium, Tianhe; Referees: Margeta (SLO), Bock (GER)

Quarterfinals

November 23; 20:55	Report	Hong Kong	1–25	Kazakhstan	Tianhe Natatorium, Tianhe; Referees: Al Saad (KUW), Al Sheaifi (KSA)
November 23; 20:55	Report	Score by quarters: 0–8, 0–5, 1–8, 0–4			Tianhe Natatorium, Tianhe; Referees: Al Saad (KUW), Al Sheaifi (KSA)
November 23; 20:55	Report	To To Toby 1	Goals	Ruday 6	Tianhe Natatorium, Tianhe; Referees: Al Saad (KUW), Al Sheaifi (KSA)

Classification 5th–8th

November 24; 15:55	Report	Singapore	14–6	Hong Kong	Tianhe Natatorium, Tianhe; Referees: Ni (CHN), Lee (KOR)
November 24; 15:55	Report	Score by quarters: 3–0, 2–2, 4–2, 5–2			Tianhe Natatorium, Tianhe; Referees: Ni (CHN), Lee (KOR)
November 24; 15:55	Report	Teo Zhen Wei 4	Goals	Ku Yat Wa 3	Tianhe Natatorium, Tianhe; Referees: Ni (CHN), Lee (KOR)

7th place match

November 25; 14:30	Report	Saudi Arabia	20–11	Hong Kong	Tianhe Natatorium, Tianhe; Referees: Tan (SIN), Al Saad (KUW)
November 25; 14:30	Report	Score by quarters: 7–3, 3–1, 3–4, 7–3			Tianhe Natatorium, Tianhe; Referees: Tan (SIN), Al Saad (KUW)
November 25; 14:30	Report	Al Dughather 6	Goals	Zhao Jinwen 4	Tianhe Natatorium, Tianhe; Referees: Tan (SIN), Al Saad (KUW)

== Weightlifting ==
Athlete	Event	Snatch			Clean & Jerk			Total	Rank
Athlete	Event	Attempt 1	Attempt 2	Attempt 3	Attempt 1	Attempt 2	Attempt 3	Total	Rank
Yu Weili	Women's 53 kg	85	~~90~~	90	107	~~112~~	~~112~~	197	5th

== Wushu ==
=== Men ===
Changquan

Athlete	Event	Changquan		Total	
Athlete	Event	Result	Rank	Result	Rank
Leung Man Chun	Changquan	9.53	8th		

Nanquan\Nangun

Athlete	Event	Nanquan		Nangun		Total	
Athlete	Event	Result	Rank	Result	Rank	Result	Rank
He Jing De	Nanquan\Nangun All-Round	9.66	2nd	9.74	2nd	19.40	2nd place, silver medalist(s)

Taijiquan\Taijijian

Athlete	Event	Taijijian		Taijiquan		Total	
Athlete	Event	Result	Rank	Result	Rank	Result	Rank
Hei Zhi Hong	Taijiquan\Taijijian All-Round	9.62	5th	9.64	4th	19.26	5th

Daoshu\Gunshu

Athlete	Event	Daoshu		Gunshu		Total	
Athlete	Event	Result	Rank	Result	Rank	Result	Rank
Cheng Chung Hang	Daoshu\Gunshu All-Round	9.43	6th	9.18	7th	18.61	7th

Sanshou

Athlete	Event	Round of 16	Quarterfinals	Semifinals	Final
Athlete	Event	Opposition Result	Opposition Result	Opposition Result	Opposition Result
Wong Ting Hong	56 kg	Li Xinjie (CHN); L PTS 0-2	did not advance		

=== Women ===
Changquan

Athlete	Event	Changquan		Total	
Athlete	Event	Result	Rank	Result	Rank
Geng Xiao Ling	Changquan	9.75	1st place, gold medalist(s)		

Nanquan\Nangun

Athlete	Event	Nanquan		Nangun		Total	
Athlete	Event	Result	Rank	Result	Rank	Result	Rank
Yuen Ka Ying	Nanquan\Nangun All-Round	9.54	2nd	9.26	5th	18.80	4th

Jianshu\Qiangshu

Athlete	Event	Jianshu		Qiangshu		Total	
Athlete	Event	Result	Rank	Result	Rank	Result	Rank
Zheng Tian Hui	Jianshu\Qiangshu All-Round	9.73	2nd	9.72	2nd	19.45	2nd place, silver medalist(s)
