= Fencing at the 2010 Asian Games – Women's individual foil =

Women's individual foil at the 2010 Asian Games
- Venue: Guangda Gymnasium
- Date: 19 November 2010
- Competitors: 17 from 9 nations

Medalists
gold medal	Nam Hyun-hee	South Korea
silver medal	Chen Jinyan	China
bronze medal	Jeon Hee-sook	South Korea
bronze medal	Dai Huili	China

The women's individual foil competition at the 2010 Asian Games in Guangzhou was held on 19 November at the Guangda Gymnasium.

== Schedule ==
All times are China Standard Time (UTC+08:00)

Date	Time	Event
Friday, 19 November 2010	12:30	Round of pools
Friday, 19 November 2010	15:00	Round of 16
Friday, 19 November 2010	16:20	Quarterfinals
Friday, 19 November 2010	18:40	Semifinals
Friday, 19 November 2010	20:00	Gold medal match

== Results ==
=== Round of pools ===
==== Pool 1 ====
Athlete	KOR	JPN	SIN	PHI	HKG	QAT
Nam Hyun-hee (KOR)	—	5–1	5–0	5–0	5–1	5–1
Shiho Nishioka (JPN)	1–5	—	5–3	5–0	4–3	5–1
Wang Wenying (SIN)	0–5	3–5	—	5–1	5–1	5–1
Jaime Nicanor (PHI)	0–5	0–5	1–5	—	1–5	5–1
Cheung Ho King (HKG)	1–5	3–4	1–5	5–1	—	5–3
Noora Al-Kuwari (QAT)	1–5	1–5	1–5	1–5	3–5	—

==== Pool 2 ====
Athlete	KOR	CHN	HKG	VIE	QAT	IND
Jeon Hee-sook (KOR)	—	3–5	4–2	5–0	5–0	5–0
Chen Jinyan (CHN)	5–3	—	5–2	3–0	5–0	5–2
Lin Po Heung (HKG)	2–4	2–5	—	5–2	5–1	5–4
Nguyễn Thị Tươi (VIE)	0–5	0–3	2–5	—	5–0	5–0
Ghareeba Hammad (QAT)	0–5	0–5	1–5	0–5	—	2–5
S. Bindu Devi (IND)	0–5	2–5	4–5	0–5	5–2	—

==== Pool 3 ====
Athlete	JPN	CHN	SIN	IND	VIE
Kanae Ikehata (JPN)	—	0–1	2–5	5–1	5–0
Dai Huili (CHN)	1–0	—	3–2	5–2	5–1
Ruth Ng (SIN)	5–2	2–3	—	4–1	5–0
W. Roji Devi (IND)	1–5	2–5	1–4	—	5–3
Nguyễn Thị Nguyệt (VIE)	0–5	1–5	0–5	3–5	—

==== Summary ====
Rank	Pool	Athlete	W	L	W/M	TD	TF
1	1	Nam Hyun-hee (KOR)	5	0	1.000	+22	25
2	2	Chen Jinyan (CHN)	5	0	1.000	+16	23
3	3	Dai Huili (CHN)	4	0	1.000	+9	14
4	2	Jeon Hee-sook (KOR)	4	1	0.800	+15	22
5	1	Shiho Nishioka (JPN)	4	1	0.800	+8	20
6	3	Ruth Ng (SIN)	3	1	0.750	+10	16
7	1	Wang Wenying (SIN)	3	2	0.600	+5	18
8	2	Lin Po Heung (HKG)	3	2	0.600	+3	19
9	3	Kanae Ikehata (JPN)	2	2	0.500	+5	12
10	2	Nguyễn Thị Tươi (VIE)	2	3	0.400	–1	12
11	1	Cheung Ho King (HKG)	2	3	0.400	–3	15
12	3	W. Roji Devi (IND)	1	3	0.250	–8	9
13	2	S. Bindu Devi (IND)	1	4	0.200	–11	11
14	1	Jaime Nicanor (PHI)	1	4	0.200	–14	7
15	3	Nguyễn Thị Nguyệt (VIE)	0	4	0.000	–16	4
16	1	Noora Al-Kuwari (QAT)	0	5	0.000	–18	7
17	2	Ghareeba Hammad (QAT)	0	5	0.000	–22	3

=== Knockout round ===
Round of 16
9	Kanae Ikehata (JPN)	15
8	Lin Po Heung (HKG)	5
5	Shiho Nishioka (JPN)	15
12	W. Roji Devi (IND)	7
13	S. Bindu Devi (IND)	3
4	Jeon Hee-sook (KOR)	15
11	Cheung Ho King (HKG)	3
6	Ruth Ng (SIN)	15
7	Wang Wenying (SIN)	15
10	Nguyễn Thị Tươi (VIE)	6

Quarterfinals
1	Nam Hyun-hee (KOR)	11
9	Kanae Ikehata (JPN)	8
5	Shiho Nishioka (JPN)	6
4	Jeon Hee-sook (KOR)	15
3	Dai Huili (CHN)	9
6	Ruth Ng (SIN)	8
7	Wang Wenying (SIN)	7
2	Chen Jinyan (CHN)	15

Semifinals
1	Nam Hyun-hee (KOR)	15
4	Jeon Hee-sook (KOR)	14
3	Dai Huili (CHN)	11
2	Chen Jinyan (CHN)	14

Gold medal match
1	Nam Hyun-hee (KOR)	15
2	Chen Jinyan (CHN)	3

== Final standing ==
Rank	Athlete
1st place, gold medalist(s)	Nam Hyun-hee (KOR)
2nd place, silver medalist(s)	Chen Jinyan (CHN)
3rd place, bronze medalist(s)	Jeon Hee-sook (KOR)
3rd place, bronze medalist(s)	Dai Huili (CHN)
5	Shiho Nishioka (JPN)
6	Ruth Ng (SIN)
7	Wang Wenying (SIN)
8	Kanae Ikehata (JPN)
9	Lin Po Heung (HKG)
10	Nguyễn Thị Tươi (VIE)
11	Cheung Ho King (HKG)
12	W. Roji Devi (IND)
13	S. Bindu Devi (IND)
14	Jaime Nicanor (PHI)
15	Nguyễn Thị Nguyệt (VIE)
16	Noora Al-Kuwari (QAT)
17	Ghareeba Hammad (QAT)
