= Fencing at the 2009 Summer Universiade =

The Fencing competition in the 2009 Summer Universiade were held in Belgrade, Serbia.

== Medal overview ==
=== Men's events ===
Event	Gold	Silver	Bronze
Individual Épée	Benjamin Steffen (SUI)	Paolo Pizzo (ITA)	Fabian Kauter (SUI)
Individual Épée	Benjamin Steffen (SUI)	Paolo Pizzo (ITA)	Péter Szényi (HUN)
Individual Foil	Son Young-ki (KOR)	Tobia Biondo (ITA)	Huang Liangcai (CHN)
Individual Foil	Son Young-ki (KOR)	Tobia Biondo (ITA)	Thibault Sarda (FRA)
Individual Sabre	Wang Jingzhi (CHN)	Aliaksandr Buikevich (BLR)	Luigi Samele (ITA)
Individual Sabre	Wang Jingzhi (CHN)	Aliaksandr Buikevich (BLR)	Zhong Man (CHN)
Team Épée	Switzerland (SUI); Max Heinzer; Fabian Kauter; Valentin Marmillod; Benjamin Steffen	Italy (ITA); Matthew Trager; Enrico Garozzo; Roberto Bertinetti; Paolo Pizzo	Ukraine (UKR); Anatoliy Herey; Igor Reyzlin; Vitaly Medvedev; Maksym Khvorost
Team Foil	Russia (RUS); Dmitry Zherebchenko; Igor Gridnev; Artur Akhmatkhuzin; Dmitry Rigin	France (FRA); Thibault Sarda; Pierrick Saint Bonnet; Benoît Journet; Ghislain Perrier	China (CHN); Ma Jianfei; Li Hua; Li Bingwei; Huang Liangcai
Team Sabre	China (CHN); He Wei; Liu Xiao; Wang Jingzhi; Zhong Man	Italy (ITA); Marco Ciari; Massimiliano Murolo; Luigi Samele; Marco Tricarico	Hungary (HUN); Csanád Gémesi; Balázs Hamar; Pál Nagy; Zsolt Nagy

=== Women's events ===
Event	Gold	Silver	Bronze
Individual Épée	Ewa Nelip (POL)	Simona Deac (ROU)	Olga Kochneva (RUS)
Individual Épée	Ewa Nelip (POL)	Simona Deac (ROU)	Nozomi Nakano (JPN)
Individual Foil	Claudia Pigliapoco (ITA)	Julia Rashidova (RUS)	Victoria Kozyreva (RUS)
Individual Foil	Claudia Pigliapoco (ITA)	Julia Rashidova (RUS)	Martina Zacke (GER)
Individual Sabre	Kim Hye-lim (KOR)	Bao Yingying (CHN)	Ni Hong (CHN)
Individual Sabre	Kim Hye-lim (KOR)	Bao Yingying (CHN)	Tan Xue (CHN)
Team Épée	Ukraine (UKR); Olena Kryvytska; Olga Petriuk; Anfisa Pochkalova; Yana Shemyakina	Russia (RUS); Olga Kochneva; Elena Shasharina; Vlada Vlasova; Yana Zvereva	Italy (ITA); Francesca Boscarelli; Marzia Muroni; Mara Navarria; Giulia Rizzi
Team Foil	Italy (ITA); Benedetta Durando; Valentina Cipriani; Martina Batini; Claudia Pigliapoco	Russia (RUS); Diana Yakovleva; Victoria Kozyreva; Julia Rashidova; Larisa Korobeynikova	South Korea (KOR); Jeon Hee-sook; Lee Hye-sun; Oh Hye-mi
Team Sabre	Ukraine (UKR); Olga Kiseleva; Olena Voronina; Iryna Kravchuk; Nina Kozlova	Russia (RUS); Anna Illarionova; Alina Ozolina; Dina Galiakbarova; Viktoriya Kovaleva	South Korea (KOR); Kim Hye-lim; Lee Hee-ra; Kim Hyea-rim

== Medal table ==
Rank	Nation	Gold	Silver	Bronze	Total
1	Italy (ITA)	2	4	2	8
2	China (CHN)	2	1	5	8
3	South Korea (KOR)	2	0	2	4
4	Switzerland (SUI)	2	0	1	3
4	Ukraine (UKR)	2	0	1	3
6	Russia (RUS)	1	4	2	7
7	Poland (POL)	1	0	0	1
8	France (FRA)	0	1	1	2
9	Belarus (BLR)	0	1	0	1
9	Romania (ROU)	0	1	0	1
11	Hungary (HUN)	0	0	2	2
12	Germany (GER)	0	0	1	1
12	Japan (JPN)	0	0	1	1
Totals (13 entries)		12	12	18	42
