= Swimming at the 2010 Asian Games – Women's 800 metre freestyle =

Women's 800 metre freestyle at the 2010 Asian Games
- Venue: Aoti Aquatics Centre
- Date: 17 November 2010
- Competitors: 12 from 8 nations

Medalists
gold medal	Li Xuanxu	China
silver medal	Shao Yiwen	China
bronze medal	Maiko Fujino	Japan

The women's 800 metre freestyle event at the 2010 Asian Games took place on 17 November 2010 at Guangzhou Aoti Aquatics Centre.

There were 12 competitors from 8 countries who took part in this event. 8 swimmers with the fast qualifying time were in the fast heat, the others were in the slow heat. The final ranking was arranged by the times from both heats.

Li Xuanxu and Shao Yiwen from China won the gold and silver medal respectively, Japanese swimmer Maiko Fujino won the bronze medal.

== Schedule ==
All times are China Standard Time (UTC+08:00)

Date	Time	Event
Wednesday, 17 November 2010	10:13	Slow heat
Wednesday, 17 November 2010	19:14	Fast heat

== Records ==
Prior to this competition, the existing world, Asian and Games records were as follows.

World Record	Rebecca Adlington (GBR)	8:14.10	Beijing, China	16 August 2008
Asian Record	Chen Qian (CHN)	8:20.36	Jinan, China	23 October 2009
Games Record	Chen Hua (CHN)	8:25.36	Busan, South Korea	5 October 2002

== Results ==
Rank	Heat	Athlete	Time	Notes
1st place, gold medalist(s)	2	Li Xuanxu (CHN)	8:23.55	GR
2nd place, silver medalist(s)	2	Shao Yiwen (CHN)	8:24.14	
3rd place, bronze medalist(s)	2	Maiko Fujino (JPN)	8:33.55	
4	1	Seo Youn-jeong (KOR)	8:48.74	
5	1	Benjaporn Sriphanomthorn (THA)	8:52.94	
6	1	Erica Totten (PHI)	8:54.11	
7	2	Khoo Cai Lin (MAS)	8:54.34	
8	2	Rutai Santadvatana (THA)	8:55.93	
9	1	Carmen Nam (HKG)	9:01.93	
10	2	Lynette Lim (SIN)	9:02.60	
11	2	Natasha Tang (HKG)	9:05.37	
12	2	Kim Ga-eul (KOR)	9:13.16	
