= Shao Yiwen =

Chinese swimmer

Personal information
- Born: Hangzhou, China

Sport
- Sport: Swimming
Medal record
World Championships (LC)
| Bronze medal – third place | 2015 Kazan | 4×200 m freestyle |
Asian Games
| Gold medal – first place | 2010 Hangzhou | 400m freestyle |
| Silver medal – second place | 2010 Hangzhou | 800m freestyle |

Shao Yiwen 邵依雯 is a Chinese swimmer. She is a gold (Women's 400 metre freestyle) and silver (Women's 800 metre freestyle) 2010 Asian Games medalist, she competed at the 2012 Summer Olympics in the Women's 400 metre freestyle, finishing 14th in the heats, failing to qualify for the final. She finished 9th in the heats of the Women's 800 metre freestyle.
