= Swimming at the 2010 Asian Games – Women's 400 metre freestyle =

Women's 400 metre freestyle at the 2010 Asian Games
- Venue: Aoti Aquatics Centre
- Date: 15 November 2010
- Competitors: 12 from 8 nations

Medalists
gold medal	Shao Yiwen	China
silver medal	Liu Jing	China
bronze medal	Seo Youn-jeong	South Korea

The women's 400 metre freestyle event at the 2010 Asian Games took place on 15 November 2010 at Guangzhou Aoti Aquatics Centre, China.

There were 12 competitors from 8 countries who took part in this event. Two heats were held, the heat in which a swimmer competed did not formally matter for advancement, as the swimmers with the top eight times from the entire field qualified for the finals.

Shao Yiwen and Liu Jing from China won the gold and silver medal respectively, South Korean swimmer Seo Youn-jeong won the bronze medal.

== Schedule ==
All times are China Standard Time (UTC+08:00)

Date	Time	Event
Monday, 15 November 2010	09:27	Heats
Monday, 15 November 2010	18:22	Final

== Records ==
Prior to this competition, the existing world, Asian and Games records were as follows.

World Record	Federica Pellegrini (ITA)	3:59.15	Rome, Italy	26 July 2009
Asian Record	Chen Qian (CHN)	4:02.35	Jinan, China	18 October 2009
Games Record	Sachiko Yamada (JPN)	4:07.23	Busan, South Korea	3 October 2002

== Results ==
=== Heats ===
Rank	Heat	Athlete	Time	Notes
1	2	Shao Yiwen (CHN)	4:15.91	
2	1	Liu Jing (CHN)	4:16.97	
3	2	Seo Youn-jeong (KOR)	4:18.63	
4	1	Maiko Fujino (JPN)	4:19.44	
5	2	Rutai Santadvatana (THA)	4:20.61	
6	1	Lynette Lim (SIN)	4:22.28	
7	2	Khoo Cai Lin (MAS)	4:22.29	
8	1	Ranohon Amanova (UZB)	4:22.35	
9	1	Natasha Tang (HKG)	4:22.63	
10	2	Benjaporn Sriphanomthorn (THA)	4:23.55	
11	2	Stephanie Au (HKG)	4:24.33	
12	1	Ha Eun-ju (KOR)	4:24.58	

=== Final ===
Rank	Athlete	Time	Notes
1st place, gold medalist(s)	Shao Yiwen (CHN)	4:05.58	GR
2nd place, silver medalist(s)	Liu Jing (CHN)	4:08.89	
3rd place, bronze medalist(s)	Seo Youn-jeong (KOR)	4:14.50	
4	Maiko Fujino (JPN)	4:15.17	
5	Khoo Cai Lin (MAS)	4:18.71	
6	Rutai Santadvatana (THA)	4:21.01	
7	Ranohon Amanova (UZB)	4:21.51	
8	Lynette Lim (SIN)	4:21.52	
