= Lee Ra-jin =

South Korean fencer (born 1990)

Lee Ra-Jin
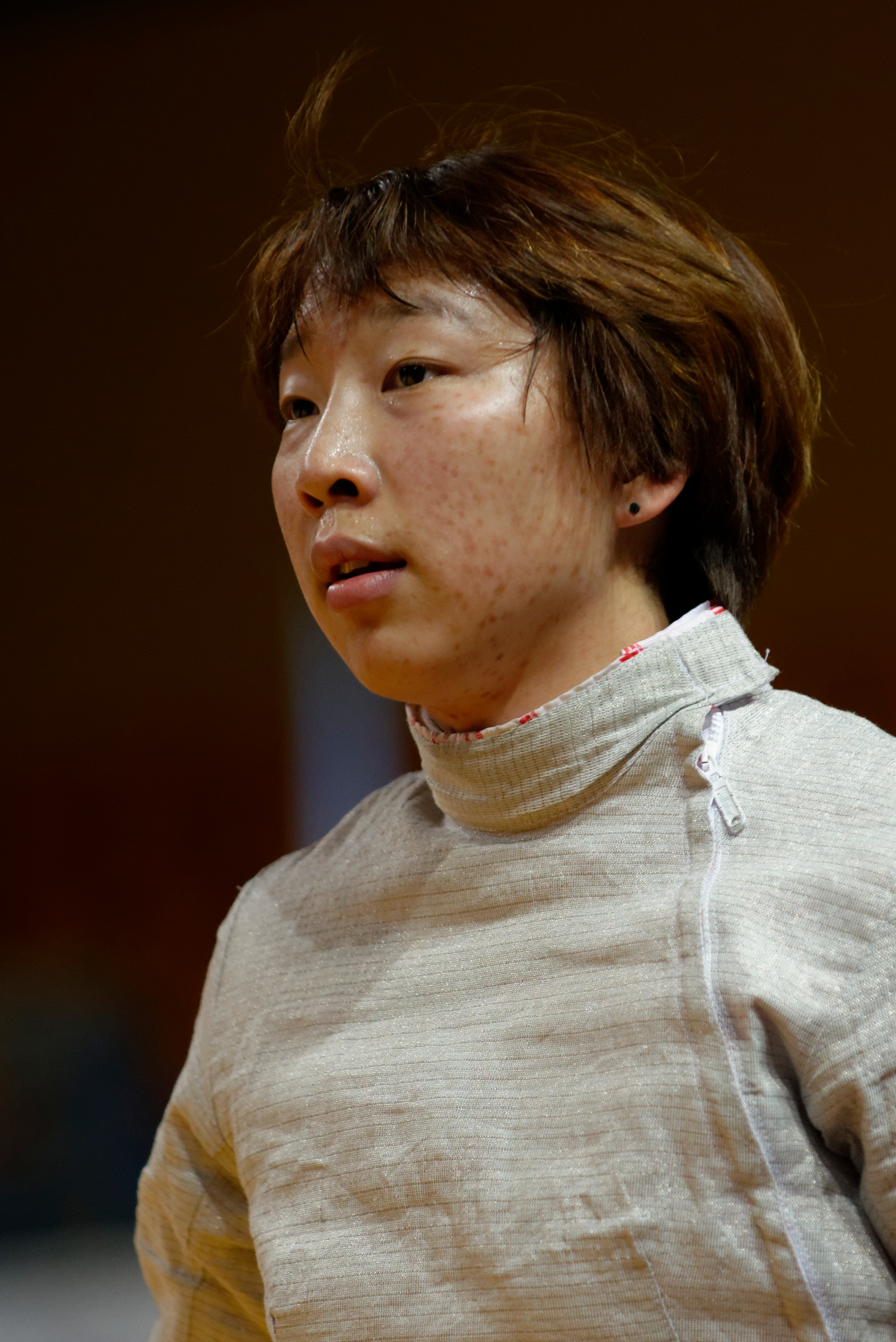
- At the 2014 Orléans Grand Prix

Personal information
- Nationality: South Korea
- Born: 10 January 1990 (age 36) Seoul, South Korea
- Height: 1.66 m (5 ft 5 in)
- Weight: 68 kg (150 lb)

Fencing career
- Sport: Fencing
- Weapon: Sabre
- Hand: right-handed
- Club: Incheon Jung-gu
- FIE ranking: current ranking
Medal record
Women's fencing
Representing South Korea
Asian Games
Gold medal – first place	2014 Incheon	Individual
Gold medal – first place	2014 Incheon	Team sabre
Silver medal – second place	2010 Guangzhou	Team sabre
Asian Championships
Gold medal – first place	2011 Seoul	Team sabre
Gold medal – first place	2012 Wakayama	Team sabre
Gold medal – first place	2013 Shanghai	Team sabre
Gold medal – first place	2015 Singapore	Team sabre
Silver medal – second place	2010 Seoul	Team sabre
Silver medal – second place	2011 Seoul	Sabre
Silver medal – second place	2013 Shanghai	Sabre
Silver medal – second place	2014 Suwon	Team Sabre
Silver medal – second place	2016 Wuxi	Team sabre
Bronze medal – third place	2012 Wakayama	Sabre
Bronze medal – third place	2014 Suwon	Sabre
Universiade
Gold medal – first place	2013 Kazan	Team sabre
Bronze medal – third place	2011 Shenzhen	Team sabre

Lee Ra-Jin (Korean: 이라진; born January 10, 1990, in Seoul) is a South Korean sabre fencer. She won a silver medal, as a member of the South Korean fencing team, in the same weapon at the 2010 Asian Games in Guangzhou, China.

Lee represented South Korea at the 2012 Summer Olympics in London, where she competed in the women's individual sabre event, along with her teammate Kim Ji-yeon, who eventually won the gold medal in the final. However, she lost the first preliminary round match to Venezuela's Alejandra Benítez, with a final score of 9–15.
