= Shiho Nishioka =

Japanese fencer

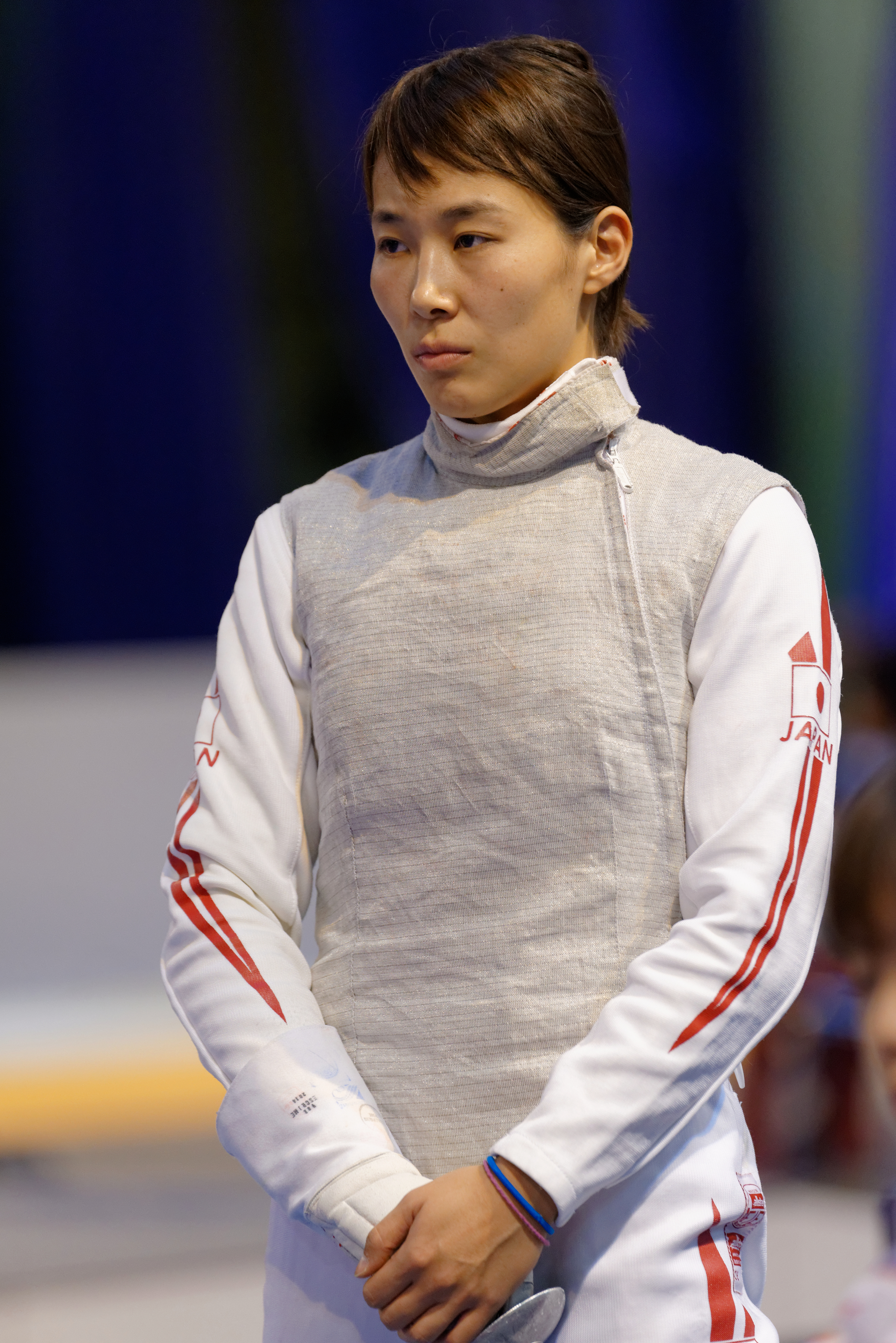

Personal information
- Born: 23 February 1989 (age 37) Wakayama, Wakayama, Japan
- Height: 1.69 m (5 ft 7 in)
- Weight: 60 kg (132 lb)

Fencing career
- Sport: Fencing
- Weapon: foil
- Hand: right-handed
- National coach: Bernát Zoltán
- Club: Nexus Fencing
- FIE ranking: current ranking

Shiho Nishioka (西岡 詩穂, Nishioka Shiho; born 23 February 1989) is a Japanese female foil fencer.

She qualified to the 2012 Summer Olympics as a member of the top-ranked Asian team. In the individual event, she defeated Hong Kong's Lin Po Heung in the first round, then lost 8–14 to five-time Olympic champion Valentina Vezzali of Italy. In the team event Japan was crushed 17–45 by Russia in the first round and placed 7th after the ranking matches. Nishioka fenced only against Russia.

At the 2016 Summer Olympics, she competed in the individual foil only, as there was no women's team event.

She took up fencing at the age of 12.
