= Kim Keum-hwa =

South Korean fencer (born 1982)

Personal information
- Nationality: South Korea
- Born: 21 June 1982 (age 44)
- Height: 1.68 m (5 ft 6 in)
- Weight: 60 kg (132 lb)

Korean name
- Hangul: 김금화
- RR: Gim Geumhwa
- MR: Kim Kŭmhwa

Sport
- Sport: Fencing
- Event: Sabre
Medal record
Women's fencing
Representing South Korea
Asian Games
| Silver medal – second place | 2006 Doha | Team sabre |
| Silver medal – second place | 2010 Guangzhou | Team sabre |
| Bronze medal – third place | 2006 Doha | Sabre |
| Bronze medal – third place | 2010 Guangzhou | Sabre |

Kim Keum-hwa (Korean: 김금화; Born June 21, 1982) is a South Korean sabre fencer. She won a total of four medals (two silver and two bronze), as a member of the South Korean fencing team, at the 2006 Asian Games in Doha, Qatar, and at the 2010 Asian Games in Guangzhou, China.

Kim represented South Korea at the 2008 Summer Olympics in Beijing, where she competed in the women's individual sabre event, along with her teammate Lee Shin-Mi. She defeated France's Carole Vergne in the preliminary round of thirty-two, before losing her next match to China's Tan Xue, with a score of 8–15.
