= Ham Chan-mi =

South Korean swimmer (born 1994)

Ham Chan-Mi
Personal information
- Nationality: South Korea
- Born: 2 May 1994 (age 32) Gangwon Province, South Korea
- Height: 1.72 m (5 ft 7 1/2 in)
- Weight: 59 kg (130 lb)

Sport
- Sport: Swimming
- Strokes: Backstroke
- Club: Bukwon Women's High School

Ham Chan-mi (Korean: 함찬미; born May 2, 1994, in Gangwon Province) is a South Korean swimmer, who specialized in backstroke events. Ham is a two-time finalist in both 100 and 200 m backstroke at the 2010 Asian Games in Guangzhou, China.

Ham qualified for the women's 200 m backstroke at the 2012 Summer Olympics in London, by eclipsing a FINA B-standard entry time of 2:14.88 from the FINA World Championships in Shanghai, China. Ham challenged four other swimmers on the first heat, including two-time Olympian Carolina Colorado of Colombia. She raced to third place by more than a second behind Colorado, outside her entry time of 2:15.30. Ham failed to advance into the semifinals, as she placed thirty-first overall in the preliminary heats.
