= Kim Hye-lim =

South Korean fencer (born 1985)

Personal information
- Nationality: South Korean
- Born: 6 December 1985 (age 40)

Sport
- Sport: Sabre fencing

Korean name
- Hangul: 김혜림
- RR: Gim Hyerim
- MR: Kim Hyerim
Medal record
World Championships
Bronze medal – third place	2006 Turin	Sabre
Asian Games
Gold medal – first place	2010 Guangzhou	Sabre
Silver medal – second place	2006 Doha	Team sabre
Silver medal – second place	2010 Guangzhou	Team sabre
Universiade
Gold medal – first place	2009 Belgrade	Sabre
Bronze medal – third place	2009 Belgrade	Team sabre

Kim Hye-lim (born 6 December 1985) is a South Korean sabre fencer.

Kim won the bronze medal at the sabre 2006 World Fencing Championships after she lost 15-14 to Rebecca Ward in the semi-final.

== Achievements ==
2006 World Fencing Championships, sabre
