= Yuliya Zhivitsa =

Kazakhstani fencer (born 1990)

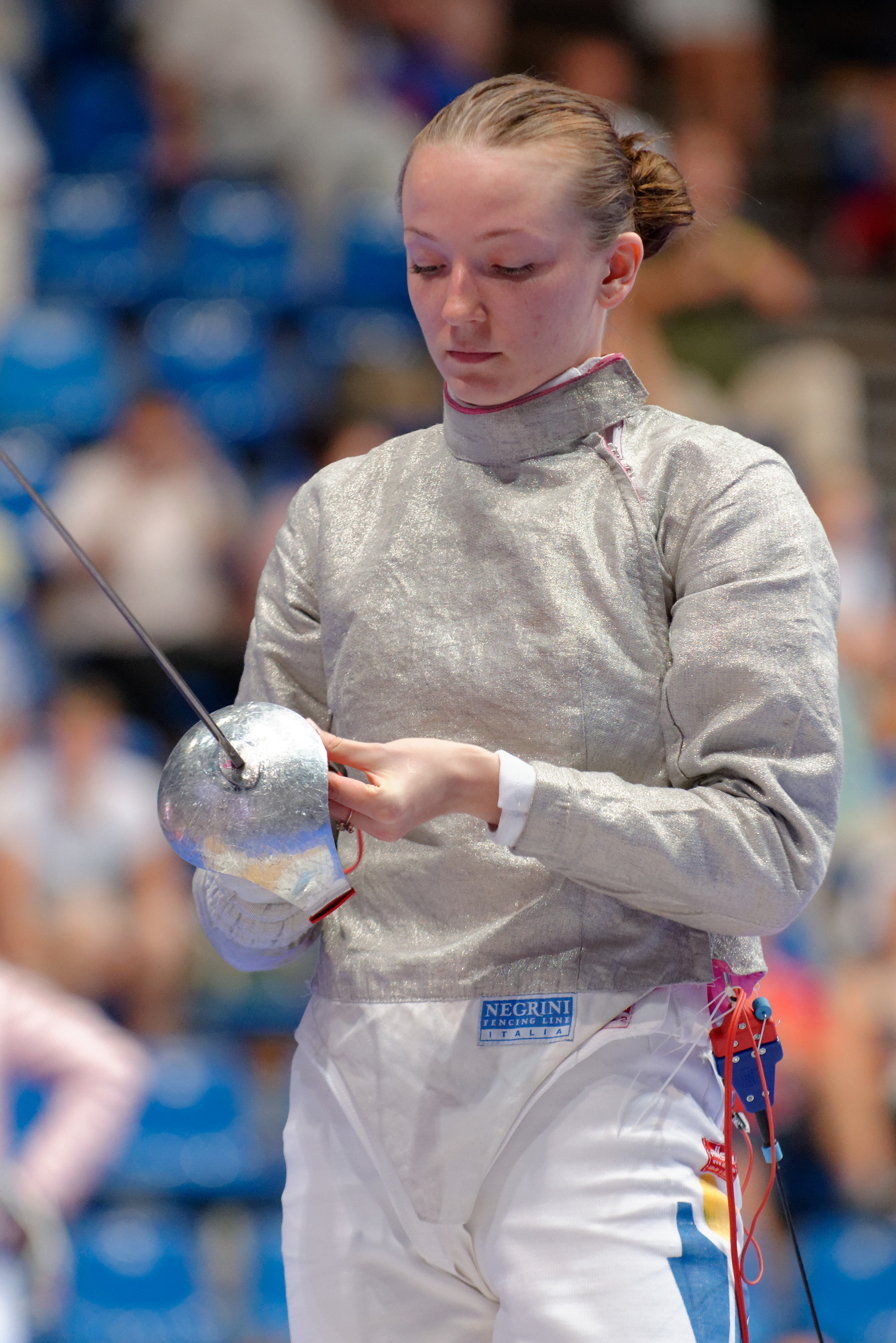
- Zhivitsa at the 2013 World Championships

Personal information
- Nationality: Kazakhstani
- Born: 14 May 1990 (age 36) Alma-Ata, Kazakh SSR, Soviet Union
- Height: 1.70 m (5 ft 7 in)
- Weight: 51 kg (112 lb)

Fencing career
- Sport: Fencing
- Weapon: sabre
- Hand: right-handed
- National coach: Evgeny Dyaokokin
- FIE ranking: current ranking
Medal record
Women's sabre
Representing Kazakhstan
Asian Games
Bronze medal – third place	2010 Guangzhou	Team sabre
Bronze medal – third place	2014 Incheon	Team sabre

Yuliya Zhivitsa (Kazakh: Юлия Живица; born May 14, 1990, in Alma-Ata) is a Kazakhstani sabre fencer, team bronze medallist at the 2010 Asian Games in Guangzhou, China and at the 2014 Asian Games in Incheon.

Zhivitsa represented Kazakhstan at the 2012 Summer Olympics in London, where she competed in the women's individual sabre event. She lost the first preliminary round match to Russia's Yuliya Gavrilova, with a final score of 7–15.
