= Lin Po Heung =

Hong Kong fencer

Personal information
- Born: May 2, 1985 (age 41) Hong Kong
- Height: 163 cm (5 ft 4 in)
- Weight: 62 kg (137 lb)

Fencing career
- Sport: Fencing
- Country: Hong Kong
- Hand: Right-handed
- Head coach: Lui Tan Tak
- FIE ranking: current ranking

Lin Po Heung (Chinese: 連寶香; Jyutping: lin^{4} bou^{2} hoeng^{1}) is a Hong Kong female fencer. At the 2012 Summer Olympics she competed in the Women's foil, defeated 10–13 in the first round.
