= Tan Xue =

Chinese fencer (born 1984)

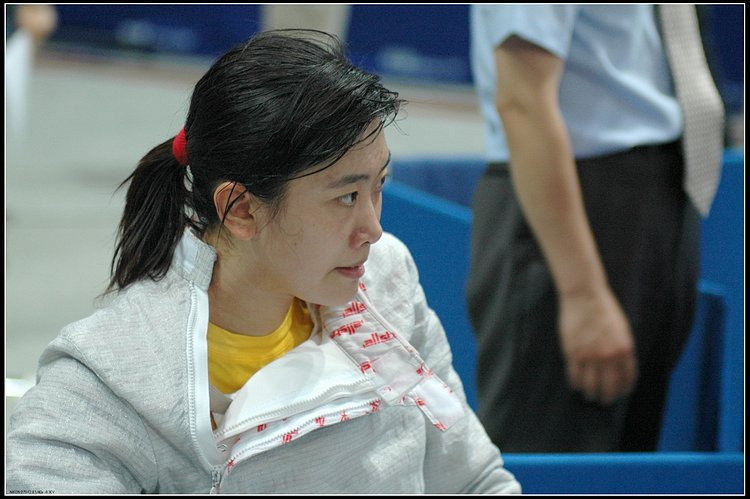

Personal information
- Born: 30 January 1984 (age 42) Tianjin
- Height: 1.75 m (5 ft 9 in)
- Weight: 66 kg (146 lb)

Fencing career
- Sport: Fencing
- Weapon: sabre
- Hand: left-handed
- Retired: 2011
- FIE ranking: ranking (archive)
Medal record
Women's fencing
Representing China
Olympic Games
Silver medal – second place	2004 Athens	Sabre
Silver medal – second place	2008 Beijing	Team sabre
World Championships
Gold medal – first place	2002 Lisbon	Sabre
Silver medal – second place	2003 Lisbon	Sabre
Silver medal – second place	2003 Lisbon	Team sabre
Silver medal – second place	2007 St Petersburg	Sabre

Tan Xue (simplified Chinese: 谭雪; traditional Chinese: 譚雪; pinyin: Tán Xuě; born January 30, 1984, in Tianjin) is a female Chinese fencer who won silver medals in the Sabre Individual at the 2004 Summer Olympics and in the Team Sabre at the 2008 Summer Olympics.

She became world champion in 2002, defeating the former double world champion Yelena Jemayeva in the final, and won silver medals in both Individual and Team Sabre at the 2003 World Championship. She won the Fencing World Cup in the 2001–02 and the 2006–07 seasons.

She married fencer Wang Jingzhi in 2009.

== Early life ==
On January 30, 1984, Tan Xue was born in an ordinary family in Tanggu District, Tianjin. When she was in elementary school, Tan Xue loved jumping around and was particularly fond of sports. In 1994, because Tan Xue was lively and active, coach Zhang Bo took a fancy to Tan Xue's athletic talent and was selected into the Tianjin Tanggu Amateur Sports School and began hurdle training. In 1994, Tan Xue won second place in the Tianjin municipal hurdle race.

In 1998, the Tianjin Sports School Sports and Work Brigade came to Tan Xue's track and field team to select fencing members. Because Tan Xue was infatuated with the swordsman Zorro, he signed up and eventually entered the Tianjin Sports School Sports and Work Brigade branch, and changed to the Tianjin Fencing Team. Practiced fencing and started her career in women's saber sports.

== Career ==
On July 11, 2006, the 2006 National Fencing Championship finals were held at the Tianjin Gymnasium. In the women's individual saber finals, Tan Xue lost to Zhao Yuanyuan with a sword difference of 14 to 15 and won the runner-up.

== Personal life ==
Tan Xue's husband Wang Jingzhi is a fencer. The relationship between Tan Xue and Wang Jingzhi began in the 2002 World Youth Championship in Turkey. At that time, Tan Xue failed to qualify for the semi-finals and could not hold back her tears. When the coach and other teammates did not notice, Wang Jingzhi appeared in front of Tan Xue, and the two fell into each other. love river. In March 2009, the two of them registered their marriage, but due to preparations for the 11th National Games, they postponed the wedding until May 1, 2010.On July 11, 2012, Tan Xue gave birth to a daughter in Tianjin. The baby weighed 7 pounds and 4 taels. Tan Xue and his wife were very happy.
