= Women's sabre at the 2014 World Fencing Championships =

The women's sabre event of the 2014 World Fencing Championships was held on 18 July 2014. A qualification was held on 15 July.

== Medalists ==
Gold	Olha Kharlan (UKR)
Silver	Mariel Zagunis (USA)
Bronze	Yana Egorian (RUS)
Bronze	Yekaterina Dyachenko (RUS)

== Draw ==
=== Finals ===
Semi-finals
(United States) Mariel Zagunis	15
(Russia) Yana Egorian	12
(Russia) Yekaterina Dyachenko	7
(Ukraine) Olha Kharlan	15

Final
(United States) Mariel Zagunis	12
(Ukraine) Olha Kharlan	15

=== Top half ===
==== Section 1 ====
Round of 64
1	(United States) Mariel Zagunis	15
64	(Hong Kong) Lam Hin Wai	4
33	(Hungary) Kata Várhelyi	15
32	(India) Bhavani Chadalavada	4
17	(China) Yu Xinting	15
48	(Azerbaijan) Sevinj Bunyatova	11
49	(Poland) Marta Puda	7
16	(France) Cécilia Berder	15
9	(Poland) Aleksandra Socha	15
56	(Mexico) Úrsula González	8
41	(Russia) Dina Galiakbarova	15
24	(Ukraine) Olha Zhovnir	11
25	(Spain) Laia Vila	11
40	(Dominican Republic) Rossy Félix	15
57	(Azerbaijan) Sabina Mikina	12
8	(United States) Anne-Elizabeth Stone	15

Round of 32
1	(United States) Mariel Zagunis	15
33	(Hungary) Kata Várhelyi	7
17	(China) Yu Xinting	13
16	(France) Cécilia Berder	15
9	(Poland) Aleksandra Socha	15
41	(Russia) Dina Galiakbarova	10
40	(Dominican Republic) Rossy Félix	10
8	(United States) Anne-Elizabeth Stone	15

Round of 16
1	(United States) Mariel Zagunis	15
16	(France) Cécilia Berder	12
9	(Poland) Aleksandra Socha	15
8	(United States) Anne-Elizabeth Stone	11

Quarterfinals
1	(United States) Mariel Zagunis	15
9	(Poland) Aleksandra Socha	11

==== Section 2 ====
Round of 64
5	(Greece) Vassiliki Vougiouka	15
60	(Canada) Marissa Ponich	7
37	(Venezuela) Alejandra Benítez	13
28	(Hong Kong) Au Sin Ying	15
21	(Kazakhstan) Yuliya Zhivitsa	13
44	(Panama) Eileen Grench	15
53	(Italy) Ilaria Bianco	15
12	(China) Shen Chen	8
13	(Italy) Rossella Gregorio	9
52	(Germany) Anna Limbach	15
45	(Russia) Yana Egorian	15
20	(France) Manon Brunet	8
29	(Georgia (country)) Teodora Kakhiani	13
36	(Japan) Mika Kikuchi	15
61	(Italy) Lucrezia Sinigaglia	15
4	(South Korea) Kim Ji-yeon	14

Round of 32
5	(Greece) Vassiliki Vougiouka	15
28	(Hong Kong) Au Sin Ying	6
44	(Panama) Eileen Grench	12
53	(Italy) Ilaria Bianco	15
52	(Germany) Anna Limbach	9
45	(Russia) Yana Egorian	15
36	(Japan) Mika Kikuchi	15
61	(Italy) Lucrezia Sinigaglia	13

Round of 16
5	(Greece) Vassiliki Vougiouka	15
53	(Italy) Ilaria Bianco	10
45	(Russia) Yana Egorian	15
36	(Japan) Mika Kikuchi	4

Quarterfinals
5	(Greece) Vassiliki Vougiouka	14
45	(Russia) Yana Egorian	15

=== Bottom half ===
==== Section 3 ====
Round of 64
3	(Russia) Yekaterina Dyachenko	15
62	(China) Zhang Xueqian	10
35	(Hungary) Nora Garam	15
30	(Ukraine) Olena Voronina	8
19	(Hungary) Anna Márton	15
46	(Indonesia) Diah Permatasari	5
51	(Hong Kong) Chang Karen Ngai Hing	15
14	(United States) Ibtihaj Muhammad	7
11	(France) Charlotte Lembach	15
54	(Poland) Bogna Jóźwiak	10
43	(Tunisia) Amira Ben Chaabane	8
22	(Poland) Małgorzata Kozaczuk	15
27	(Germany) Stefanie Kubissa	15
38	(Canada) Gabriella Page	9
59	(China) Li Fei	8
6	(United States) Dagmara Wozniak	15

Round of 32
3	(Russia) Yekaterina Dyachenko	15
35	(Hungary) Nora Garam	7
19	(Hungary) Anna Márton	15
51	(Hong Kong) Chang Karen Ngai Hing	6
11	(France) Charlotte Lembach	13
22	(Poland) Małgorzata Kozaczuk	15
27	(Germany) Stefanie Kubissa	5
6	(United States) Dagmara Wozniak	15

Round of 16
3	(Russia) Yekaterina Dyachenko	15
19	(Hungary) Anna Márton	14
22	(Poland) Małgorzata Kozaczuk	9
6	(United States) Dagmara Wozniak	15

Quarterfinals
3	(Russia) Yekaterina Dyachenko	15
6	(United States) Dagmara Wozniak	13

==== Section 4 ====
Round of 64
7	(Italy) Irene Vecchi	15
58	(Japan) Maho Hamada	5
39	(South Korea) Hwang Seo-na	15
26	(Hungary) Anna Várhelyi	12
23	(Ukraine) Olena Kravatska	11
42	(Russia) Sofiya Velikaya	15
55	(Dominican Republic) Heyddys Valentin	11
10	(South Korea) Lee Ra-jin	15
15	(Tunisia) Azza Besbes	15
50	(Kazakhstan) Aibike Khabibullina	12
47	(Mexico) Paola Pliego	15
18	(Spain) Araceli Navarro	9
31	(South Korea) Yoon Ji-su	15
34	(Kazakhstan) Tamara Pochekutova	10
63	(Japan) Mami Itoh	9
2	(Ukraine) Olha Kharlan	15

Round of 32
7	(Italy) Irene Vecchi	15
39	(South Korea) Hwang Seo-na	14
42	(Russia) Sofiya Velikaya	15
15	(South Korea) Lee Ra-jin	12
15	(Tunisia) Azza Besbes	15
47	(Mexico) Paola Pliego	8
31	(South Korea) Yoon Ji-su	10
2	(Ukraine) Olha Kharlan	15

Round of 16
7	(Italy) Irene Vecchi	13
42	(Russia) Sofiya Velikaya	15
15	(Tunisia) Azza Besbes	7
2	(Ukraine) Olha Kharlan	15

Quarterfinals
42	(Russia) Sofiya Velikaya	9
2	(Ukraine) Olha Kharlan	15

== Final classification ==
Rank	Athlete	Nation
1st place, gold medalist(s)	Olha Kharlan	Ukraine
2nd place, silver medalist(s)	Mariel Zagunis	United States
3rd place, bronze medalist(s)	Yekaterina Dyachenko	Russia
3rd place, bronze medalist(s)	Yana Egorian	Russia
5	Vassiliki Vougiouka	Greece
6	Dagmara Wozniak	United States
7	Aleksandra Socha	Poland
8	Sofiya Velikaya	Russia
9	Irene Vecchi	Italy
10	Anne-Elizabeth Stone	United States
11	Azza Besbes	Tunisia
12	Cécilia Berder	France
13	Anna Márton	Hungary
14	Małgorzata Kozaczuk	Poland
15	Kikuchi Mika	Japan
16	Ilaria Bianco	Italy
17	Lee Ra-jin	South Korea
18	Charlotte Lembach	France
19	Yu Xinting	China
20	Stefanie Kubissa	Germany
21	Au Sin Ying	Hong Kong
22	Yoon Ji-su	South Korea
23	Kata Várhelyi	Hungary
24	Nora Garam	Hungary
25	Hwang Seona	South Korea
26	Rossy Félix	Dominican Republic
27	Dina Galiakbarova	Russia
28	Eileen Grench	Panama
29	Paola Pliego	Mexico
30	Chang Karen Ngai Hing	Hong Kong
31	Anna Limbach	Germany
32	Lucrezia Sinigaglia	Italy
33	Kim Ji-yeon	South Korea
34	Shen Chen	China
35	Ibtihaj Muhammad	United States
36	Rossella Gregorio	Italy
37	Araceli Navarro	Spain
38	Manon Brunet	France
39	Yuliya Zhivitsa	Kazakhstan
40	Olena Kravatska	Ukraine
41	Olga Zhovnir	Ukraine
42	Laia Vila	Spain
43	Anna Várhelyi	Hungary
44	Teodora Kakhiani	Georgia
45	Olena Voronina	Ukraine
46	Bhavani Devi Chadalavada Anandha Sundhararaman	India
47	Tamara Pochekutova	Kazakhstan
48	Alejandra Benítez	Venezuela
49	Gabriella Page	Canada
50	Amira Ben Chaabane	Tunisia
51	Diah Permatasari	Indonesia
52	Sevinj Bunyatova	Azerbaijan
53	Marta Puda	Poland
54	Aibike Khabibullina	Kazakhstan
55	Bogna Jóźwiak	Poland
56	Heyddys Valentin	Dominican Republic
57	Úrsula González	Mexico
58	Sabina Mikina	Azerbaijan
59	Hamada Maho	Japan
60	Li Fei	China
61	Marissa Ponich	Canada
62	Xueqian Zhang	China
63	Itoh Mami	Japan
64	Lam Hin Wai	Hong Kong
