= Fencing at the 2016 Summer Olympics – Women's team sabre =

Women's team sabre at the Games of the XXXI Olympiad
- Venue: Carioca Arena 3
- Date: 13 August 2016
- Competitors: 30 from 8 nations

Medalists
1st place, gold medalist(s)		Yekaterina Dyachenko; Yuliya Gavrilova; Yana Egorian; Sofya Velikaya	Russia
2nd place, silver medalist(s)		Olha Kharlan; Alina Komashchuk; Olena Kravatska; Olena Voronina	Ukraine
3rd place, bronze medalist(s)		Monica Aksamit; Ibtihaj Muhammad; Dagmara Wozniak; Mariel Zagunis	United States

The women's team sabre competition in fencing at the 2016 Summer Olympics in Rio de Janeiro was held on 13 August at the Carioca Arena 3.

== Schedule ==
All times are Brasília time (UTC−3)

Date	Time	Round
Saturday, 13 August 2016	09:00	Quarter-finals
Saturday, 13 August 2016	10:15	Placement 5–8
Saturday, 13 August 2016	11:30	Semi-finals
Saturday, 13 August 2016	12:45	Placement 5–6
Saturday, 13 August 2016	12:45	Placement 7–8
Saturday, 13 August 2016	17:00	Bronze medal match
Saturday, 13 August 2016	18:15	Final

== Draw ==
=== Finals ===
Quarter-finals
1	Russia	45
8	Mexico	31
5	Poland	43
4	United States	45
3	France	36
6	Italy	45
7	South Korea	40
2	Ukraine	45

Semi-finals
1	Russia	45
4	United States	42
6	Italy	42
2	Ukraine	45

Finals
1	Russia	45
2	Ukraine	30
Third place
6	Italy	30
4	United States	45

=== Classification 5–8 ===
Placement 5-8
Mexico	23
Poland	45
France	40
South Korea	45

Placement 5-6
Poland	41
South Korea	45
Placement 7-8
Mexico	45
France	38

== Final classification ==
Rank	Team	Athlete
1st place, gold medalist(s)	Russia	Yekaterina Dyachenko; Yuliya Gavrilova; Yana Egorian; Sofya Velikaya
2nd place, silver medalist(s)	Ukraine	Olha Kharlan; Alina Komashchuk; Olena Kravatska; Olena Voronina
3rd place, bronze medalist(s)	United States	Monica Aksamit; Ibtihaj Muhammad; Dagmara Wozniak; Mariel Zagunis
4	Italy	Ilaria Bianco; Rossella Gregorio; Loreta Gulotta; Irene Vecchi
5	South Korea	Kim Ji-yeon; Seo Ji-yeon; Yoon Ji-su; Hwang Seon-a
6	Poland	Malgorzata Kozaczuk; Bogna Jóźwiak; Marta Puda; Aleksandra Socha
7	Mexico	Tania Arrayales; Úrsula González; Julieta Toledo; Nataly Michel Silva
8	France	Saoussen Boudiaf; Cécilia Berder; Manon Brunet; Charlotte Lembach
