= Women's team sabre at the 2012 World Fencing Championships =

The Women's team sabre event of the 2012 World Fencing Championships took place in Kyiv.

== Medalists ==
1st place, gold medalist(s)	Russia; Sofiya Velikaya; Yuliya Gavrilova; Ekaterina Dyachenko; Dina Galiakbarova
2nd place, silver medalist(s)	Ukraine; Olha Kharlan; Olha Zhovnir; Olena Khomrova; Halyna Pundyk
3rd place, bronze medalist(s)	United States; Mariel Zagunis; Dagmara Wozniak; Daria Schneider; Ibtihaj Muhammad

== Draw ==
=== Finals ===
Semifinals
Russia	45
Italy	38
United States	41
Ukraine	45

Final
Russia	45
Ukraine	44
Third place
United States	45
Italy	36

=== Top half ===
Round of 16
Russia
bye
Germany	45
Hungary	40
China	45
Hong Kong	31
Kazakhstan	37
Italy	45

Quarterfinals
Russia	45
Germany	32
China	21
Italy	45

Semifinals
Russia	45
Italy	38

=== Bottom half ===
Round of 16
United States	45
Belarus	31
United Kingdom	34
France	45
Poland	45
Azerbaijan	37
Bye
Ukraine

Quarterfinals
United States	45
France	42
Poland	40
Ukraine	45

Semifinals
United States	41
Ukraine	45

=== Placement matches ===
==== 5–8th place ====
5–8th place semifinals
Germany	45
China	32
France	42
Poland	45

Fifth place
Germany	42
Poland	45
Seventh place
China	44
France	45

==== 9–12th place ====
9–16th place quarterfinals
Hungary
Bye
Hong Kong	43
Kazakhstan	45
Belarus	44
United Kingdom	45
Bye
Azerbaijan

9–12th place semifinals
Hungary	45
Kazakhstan	40
United Kingdom	37
Azerbaijan	45

Ninth place
Hungary	45
Azerbaijan	39
11th place
Kazakhstan	45
United Kingdom	32

==== 13–16th place ====
13–16th place semifinals
Belarus
Bye
Bye
Hong Kong

13th place
Belarus	36
Hong Kong	45

== Final classification ==
Rank	Team
1st place, gold medalist(s)	Russia
2nd place, silver medalist(s)	Ukraine
3rd place, bronze medalist(s)	United States
4	Italy
5	Poland
6	Germany
7	France
8	China
9	Hungary
10	Azerbaijan
11	Kazakhstan
12	United Kingdom
13	Hong Kong
14	Belarus
