= Olena Voronina =

Ukrainian sabre fencer (born 1990)

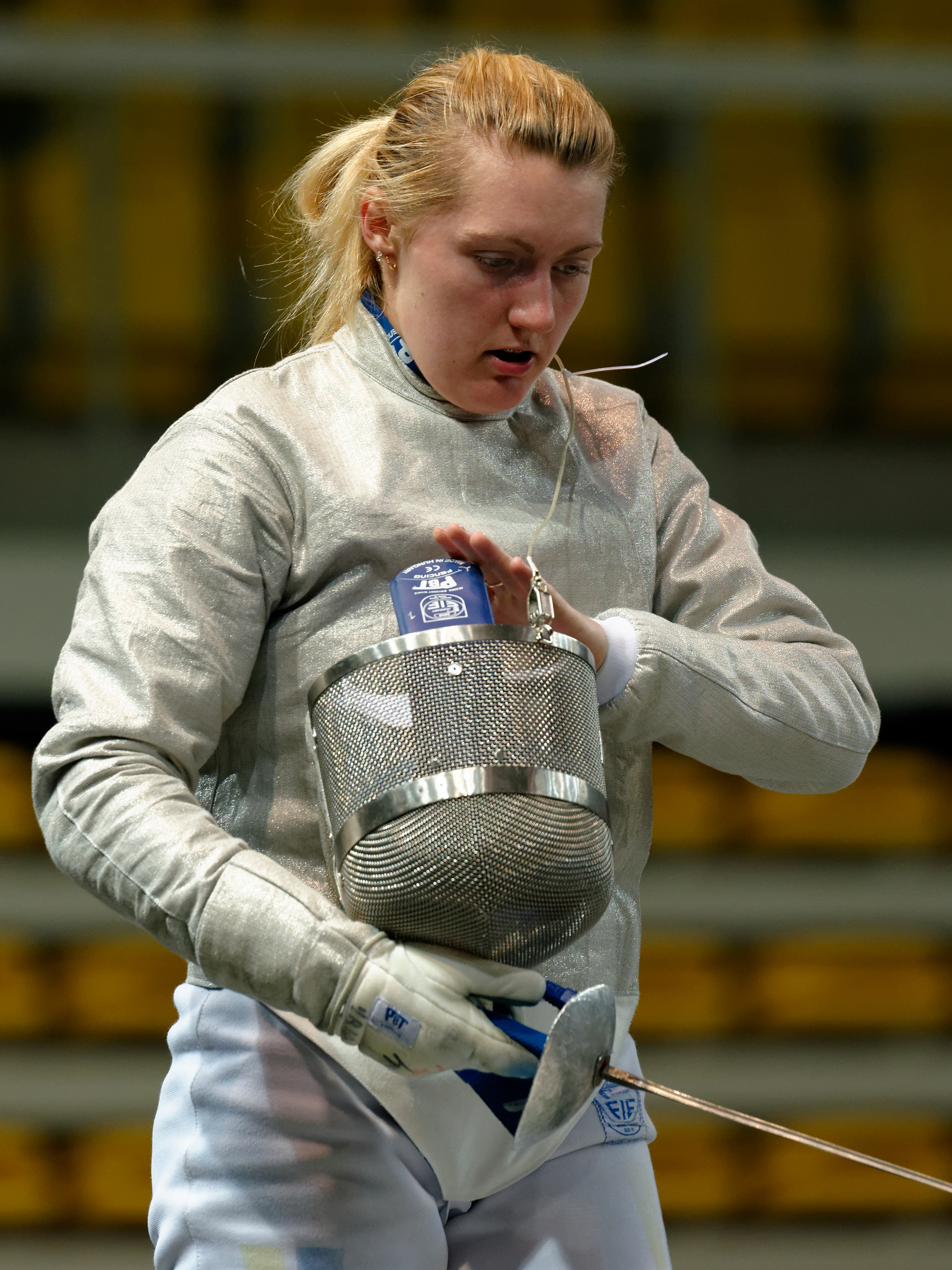
- Voronina at the 2014 European Championships

Personal information
- Native name: Олена Олександрівна Вороніна
- Nationality: Ukrainian
- Born: 5 May 1990 (age 36)
- Height: 1.69 m (5 ft 7 in)

Sport
- Country: Ukraine
- Sport: Fencing
- Event: Sabre
Medal record
Women's sabre
Representing Ukraine
Olympic Games
Silver medal – second place	2016 Rio de Janeiro	Team
World Championships
Gold medal – first place	2013 Budapest	Team
Silver medal – second place	2015 Moscow	Team
Bronze medal – third place	2014 Kazan	Team
European Championships
Silver medal – second place	2013 Zagreb	Team
Silver medal – second place	2018 Novi Sad	Team
Bronze medal – third place	2014 Strasbourg	Team
Bronze medal – third place	2015 Montreux	Individual
Bronze medal – third place	2015 Montreux	Team
Bronze medal – third place	2022 Antalya	Team
Summer Universiade
Gold medal – first place	2009 Belgrade	Team
Military World Games
Bronze medal – third place	2019 Wuhan	Team

Olena Oleksandrivna Voronina (Ukrainian: Олена Олександрівна Вороніна; born 5 May 1990) is a Ukrainian sabre fencer. She is the 2013 World team champion, 2015 European individual bronze medalist, and 2016 Olympic team silver medalist.

== Life and career ==
Voronina won a gold medal in the women's team sabre at the 2013 World Fencing Championships. She and the Ukrainian team won bronze in 2014 and silver in 2015.

At the 2016 Summer Olympics in Rio, Voronina won the silver medal with team members Olha Kharlan, Alina Komashchuk, and Olena Kravatska.

Voronina lives in Kharkiv, Ukraine. She is a student at the Kharkiv Polytechnic Institute.
