= Alina Komashchuk =

Ukrainian sabre fencer (born 1993)

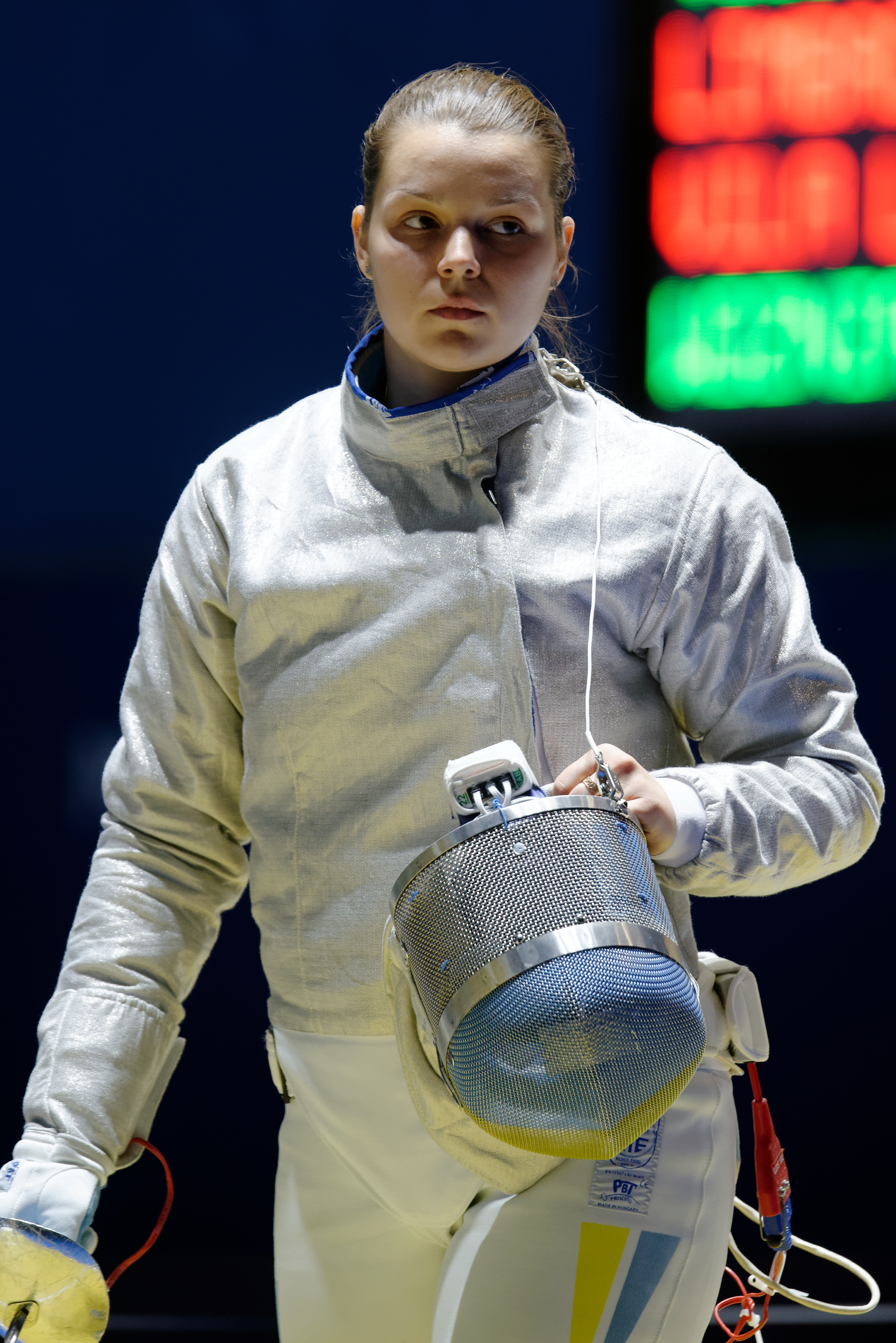
- Komashchuk at the 2015 World Championships

Personal information
- Native name: Аліна Іванівна Комащук
- Full name: Alina Ivanivna Komashchuk
- Nationality: Ukrainian
- Born: 24 April 1993 (age 33) Netishyn, Ukraine
- Height: 1.69 m (5 ft 7 in)

Sport
- Country: Ukraine
- Sport: Fencing
- Event: Sabre
- Club: CSKA
Medal record
Women's sabre
Representing Ukraine
Olympic Games
| Gold medal – first place | 2024 Paris | Team sabre |
| Silver medal – second place | 2016 Rio de Janeiro | Team sabre |
World Championships
| Gold medal – first place | 2013 Budapest | Team sabre |
| Silver medal – second place | 2015 Moscow | Team sabre |
| Bronze medal – third place | 2025 Tbilisi | Individual sabre |
European Games
| Gold medal – first place | 2015 Baku | Team sabre |
European Championships
| Silver medal – second place | 2013 Zagreb | Team sabre |
| Silver medal – second place | 2018 Novi Sad | Team sabre |
| Silver medal – second place | 2024 Basel | Team sabre |
| Silver medal – second place | 2025 Genova | Individual sabre |
| Bronze medal – third place | 2015 Montreux | Team sabre |
| Bronze medal – third place | 2026 Antony | Individual sabre |
Summer Universiade
| Silver medal – second place | 2011 Shenzhen | Team sabre |
Military World Games
| Silver medal – second place | 2019 Wuhan | Team épée |
| Bronze medal – third place | 2019 Wuhan | Individual sabre |
| Bronze medal – third place | 2019 Wuhan | Team sabre |
World Juniors Championships
| Gold medal – first place | 2009 Belfast | Team sabre |
| Gold medal – first place | 2010 Baku | Team sabre |
| Gold medal – first place | 2013 Poreč | Individual sabre |
| Bronze medal – third place | 2013 Poreč | Team sabre |
European Junior Championships
| Silver medal – second place | 2012 Poreč | Team sabre |
| Bronze medal – third place | 2009 Odense | Team sabre |
| Bronze medal – third place | 2012 Poreč | Individual sabre |
World Cadets Championships
| Gold medal – first place | 2010 Baku | Individual sabre |
European Cadets Championships
| Bronze medal – third place | 2010 Athens | Team sabre |
| Bronze medal – third place | 2010 Athens | Individual sabre |

Alina Ivanivna Komashchuk (Ukrainian: Аліна Іванівна Комащук; born 24 April 1993) is a Ukrainian sabre fencer. She is an Olympic champion and silver medallist in the team sabre event. Komashchuk won the gold medal in the team sabre event at the 2024 Summer Olympics and the silver medal in the team sabre event at the 2016 Summer Olympics. She is also a World Championships gold and silver medallist, European Games champion and European Championships silver and bronze medallist in the team sabre.

== Career ==
In April 2013, Komashchuk won the gold medal in the Women's Sabre at the 2013 Junior and Cadet World Championship, held in the Croatian town of Poreč. On 12 August 2013 she won the Gold medal (with Olha Kharlan, Halyna Pundyk and Olena Voronina) at the Women's team sabre at the 2013 World Fencing Championships in Budapest, Hungary.

During the 2012–13 season Komashchuk was ranked 4th in the World in the Women's Junior Individual Sabre classement by the Federation Internationale d'Escrime (FIE).

== Personal life ==
Komashchuk was born in Netishyn, Ukraine. As of 2013, was a student at the Kamyanets-Podilsky Ivan Ohienko National University.
