= Women's team sabre at the 2015 World Fencing Championships =

The Women's team sabre event of the 2015 World Fencing Championships was held on 16–17 July 2015.

== Medalists ==
Gold	Russia; Yekaterina Dyachenko; Yana Egorian; Yuliya Gavrilova; Sofiya Velikaya
Silver	Ukraine; Olha Kharlan; Alina Komashchuk; Olena Kravatska; Olena Voronina
Bronze	United States; Ibtihaj Muhammad; Anne-Elizabeth Stone; Dagmara Wozniak; Mariel Zagunis

== Draw ==
=== Finals ===
Final
Ukraine	41
Russia	45

Third place
United States	45
Poland	33

=== Top half ===
Round of 32
Venezuela	44
Hong Kong	45
Dominican Republic	35
Hungary	45
Germany	45
Tunisia	31

Round of 16
United States	45
Hong Kong	24
Japan	29
China	45
Italy	45
Hungary	25
Germany	21
Ukraine	45

Quarterfinals
United States	45
China	39
Italy	40
Ukraine	45

Semifinals
United States	39
Ukraine	45

=== Bottom half ===
Round of 32
Belarus	36
Azerbaijan	45
Spain	45
Egypt	36
Vietnam	38
Mexico	45
Canada	36
Kazakhstan	45

Round of 16
Russia	45
Azerbaijan	26
Spain	41
South Korea	45
Poland	45
Mexico	34
Kazakhstan	29
France	45

Quarterfinals
Russia	45
South Korea	38
Poland	45
France	44

Semifinals
Russia	45
Poland	26

=== Placement rounds ===
==== 5–8th place ====
5–8th place semifinals
China	29
Italy	45
South Korea	43
France	45

Fifth place
Italy	45
France	43
Seventh place
China	31
South Korea	45

==== 9–16th place ====
9–16th place quarterfinals
Hong Kong	45
Japan	40
Hungary	45
Germany	43
Azerbaijan	45
Spain	40
Mexico	45
Kazakhstan	38

9–12th place semifinals
Hong Kong	28
Hungary	45
Azerbaijan	45
Mexico	38

Ninth place
Hungary	42
Azerbaijan	45
Eleventh place
Hong Kong	45
Mexico	39

==== 13–16th place ====
13–16th place semifinals
Japan	45
Germany	44
Spain	45
Kazakhstan	33

13th place
Japan	45
Spain	40
15th place
Germany	45
Kazakhstan	35

== Final classification ==
Rank	Nation
1st place, gold medalist(s)	Russia
2nd place, silver medalist(s)	Ukraine
3rd place, bronze medalist(s)	United States
4	Poland
5	Italy
6	France
7	South Korea
8	China
9	Azerbaijan
10	Hungary
11	Hong Kong
12	Mexico
13	Japan
14	Spain
15	Germany
16	Kazakhstan
17	Canada
18	Venezuela
19	Belarus
20	Tunisia
21	Dominican Republic
22	Egypt
