= Anna Várhelyi =

Hungarian fencer

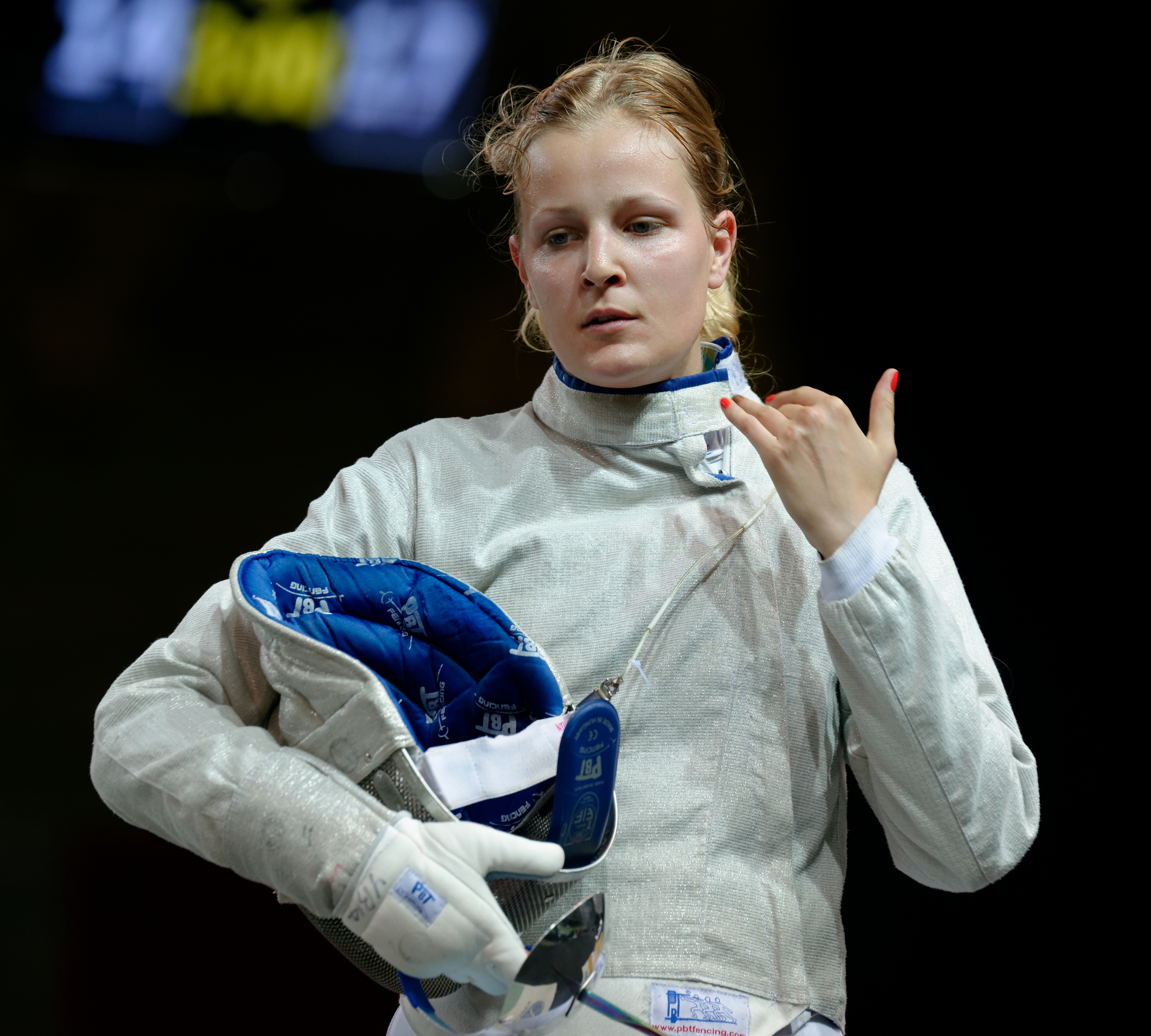
- At the 2014 European Championships

Personal information
- Nickname: Nusi
- Born: 4 May 1991 (age 35) Budapest, Hungary
- Height: 1.80 m (5 ft 11 in)
- Weight: 62 kg (137 lb)

Fencing career
- Sport: Fencing
- Weapon: sabre
- Hand: Right-handed
- National coach: Gábor Gárdos
- Club: BVSC
- Head coach: Gábor Fehér
- FIE ranking: current ranking

Anna Várhelyi (born 4 May 1991) is a Hungarian sabre fencer, and a member of the Hungarian national team.

== Career ==
Várhelyi took up fencing at the age of seven after a coach did a presentation at her school. She earned a bronze medal in the 2007 and 2008 Cadet European Championships held respectively in Novi Sad and Rovigo and a silver medal in the 2010 Junior World Championships in Baku.

Várhelyi joined the senior national team at the age of eighteen. Her first competition with them was the 2009 European Championships in which Hungary took the fourth place. At the 2013 World Fencing Championships at home in Budapest 110th-ranked Várhelyi fenced Germany's Sibylle Klemm in the first round; she reversed a 6–9 lead and won 15–13. She then edged out Spain's Sandra Marcos and prevailed over France's Béline Boulay to reach the quarter-finals, a career best as of 2014. She was stopped by World No.1 Olha Kharlan, who eventually won the gold medal. She finished the season No.28, her best ranking as of 2014.

Várhelyi's sister Kata is also a sabre fencer and a member of the Hungarian national team.
