= Yana Egorian =

Russian fencer

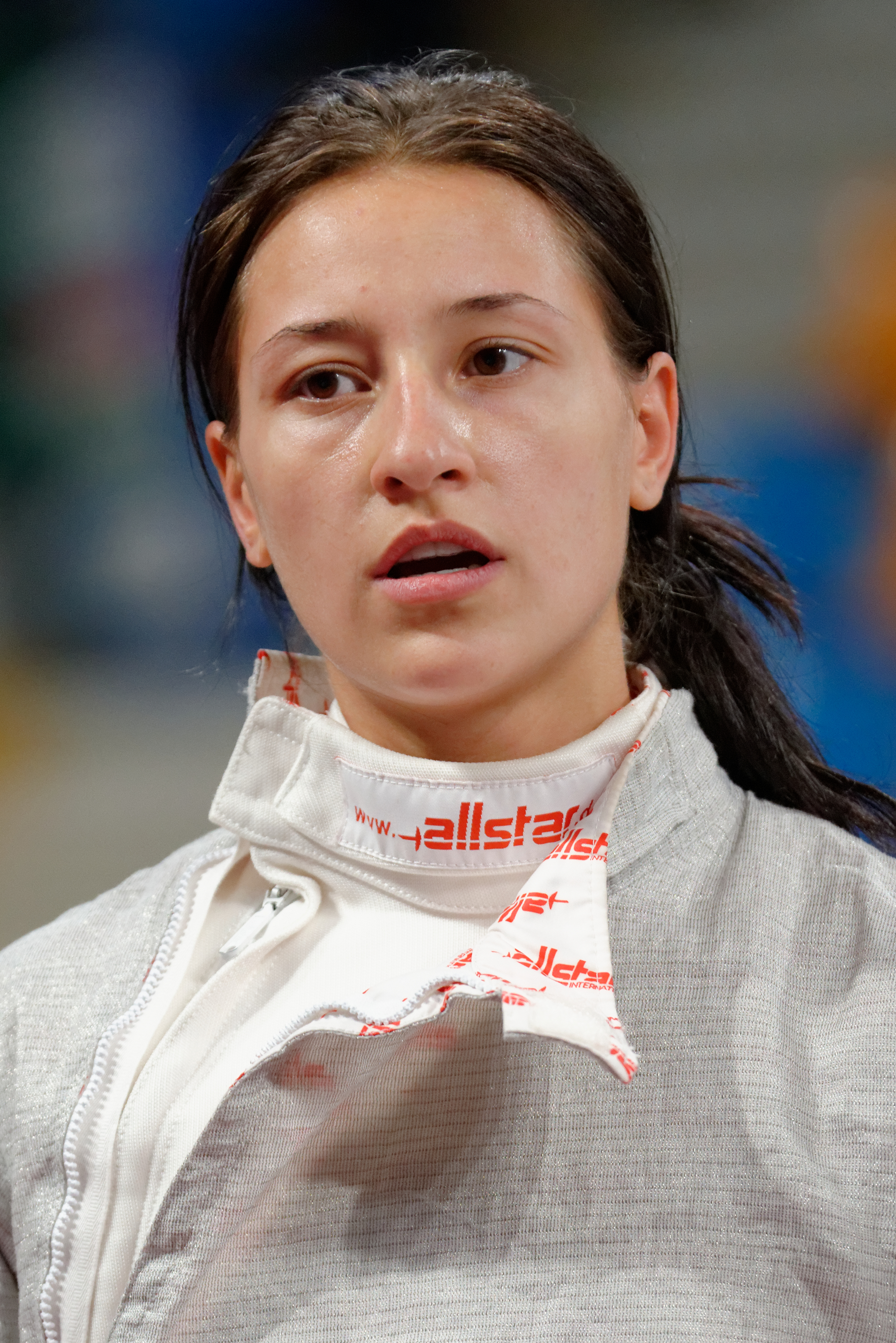
- Egorian in 2014

Personal information
- Full name: Yana Karapetovna Egorian
- Born: 20 December 1993 (age 32) Yerevan, Armenia
- Height: 175 cm (5 ft 9 in)
- Weight: 64 kg (141 lb)

Fencing career
- Sport: Fencing
- Country: Russia
- Weapon: Sabre
- Hand: Left-handed
- Club: CSKA Moscow (Central Sports Army Club) [RUS]; Khimki Fencing Sports School of Olympic Reserve [RUS]
- Head coach: Christian Bauer (national); Sergei Semin (personal)
- Assistant coach: Yelena Jemayeva
- FIE ranking: Current ranking
- Domestic ranking: 2009/2010 SWS Ranking
Medal record
Women's fencing
Representing Russia and Individual Neutral Athletes
Olympic Games
Gold medal – first place	2016 Rio de Janeiro	Individual
Gold medal – first place	2016 Rio de Janeiro	Team
World Championships
Gold medal – first place	2015 Moscow	Team
Gold medal – first place	2019 Budapest	Team
Gold medal – first place	2025 Tbilisi	Individual
Silver medal – second place	2013 Budapest	Team
Silver medal – second place	2018 Wuxi	Team
Bronze medal – third place	2014 Kazan	Individual
Bronze medal – third place	2018 Wuxi	Individual
European Championships
Gold medal – first place	2013 Zagreb	Team
Gold medal – first place	2014 Strasbourg	Team
Gold medal – first place	2015 Montreux	Team
Gold medal – first place	2016 Toruń	Team
Gold medal – first place	2018 Novi Sad	Team
Gold medal – first place	2019 Düsseldorf	Team
Gold medal – first place	2026 Antony	Team
Silver medal – second place	2017 Tbilisi	Team
Silver medal – second place	2026 Antony	Individual
Summer Universiade
Bronze medal – third place	2013 Kazan	Team
Military World Games
Gold medal – first place	2019 Wuhan	Individual
Gold medal – first place	2019 Wuhan	Team sabre
Youth Olympic Games
Gold medal – first place	2010 Singapore	Individual
Representing Mixed-NOCs team
Gold medal – first place	2010 Singapore	Mixed team

Yana Karapetovna Egorian (Russian: Яна Карапетовна Егорян, Armenian: Յանա Կարապետովնա Եգորեան; also spelled Yegoryan, born 20 December 1993) is a Russian left-handed sabre fencer, six-time team European champion, two-time team world champion, 2016 individual Olympic champion, and 2016 team Olympic champion.

== Biography ==
Egorian was born in Yerevan, Armenia. When she was 6 years old, she moved to Khimki, Moscow Oblast. She is a Russian Armed Forces athlete, and her clubs are the Russian Central Sports Army Club, and the Khimki Fencing Sports School of Olympic Reserve.

== Achievements ==
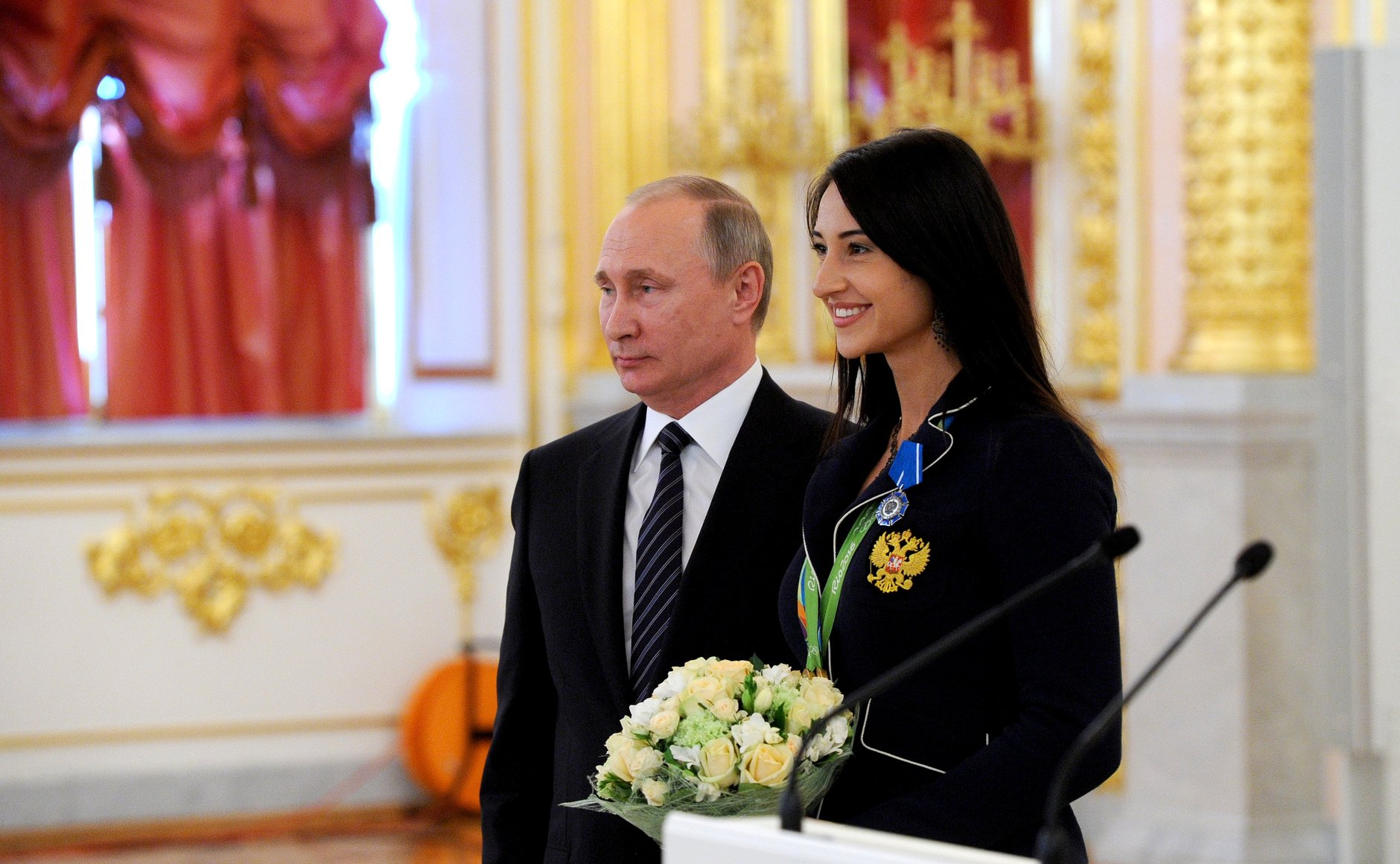
Yana Egorian and Putin

Egorian won two silver medals at the European Cadet Championships (2009 and 2010). At the Inaugural 2010 Youth Olympics in Singapore, she won two gold medals. She finished fifth at the 2010 Cadet World Championships in Baku. On 8 August 2016, Egorian won the individual gold medal in the 2016 Summer Olympics held in Rio de Janeiro. On 13 August, she won her second Olympic gold medal in the team event. The Russian team, composed of Egorian, Sofya Velikaya, Yuliya Gavrilova and Ekaterina Dyachenko, came away with the gold medal, defeating Team Ukraine (the 2008 Olympic women's team sabre champion) in the final 45–30.

She finished 2016 as Nr. 1 in the FIE women's sabre rating.

Egorian was named The Athlete of the Year by the Ministry of Sport of the Russian Federation.

Yegorian was not among the Russian athletes reinstated by the FIE in May 2023 due to her ties with the Russian Army.

== Medal record ==
=== Olympic Games ===
Year	Location	Event	Position
2016	Rio de Janeiro, Brazil	Individual Women's Sabre	1st
2016	Rio de Janeiro, Brazil	Team Women's Sabre	1st

=== World Championship ===
Year	Location	Event	Position
2013	Budapest, Hungary	Team Women's Sabre	2nd
2014	Kazan, Russia	Individual Women's Sabre	3rd
2015	Moscow, Russia	Team Women's Sabre	1st
2018	Wuxi, China	Individual Women's Sabre	3rd
2018	Wuxi, China	Team Women's Sabre	2nd
2019	Budapest, Hungary	Team Women's Sabre	1st

=== European Championship ===
Year	Location	Event	Position
2013	Zagreb, Croatia	Team Women's Sabre	1st
2014	Strasbourg, France	Team Women's Sabre	1st
2015	Montreux, Switzerland	Team Women's Sabre	1st
2016	Toruń, Poland	Team Women's Sabre	1st
2017	Tallinn, Estonia	Team Women's Sabre	2nd
2018	Novi Sad, Serbia	Team Women's Sabre	1st
2019	Düsseldorf, Germany	Team Women's Sabre	1st

=== Grand Prix ===
Date	Location	Event	Position
2015-05-29	Moscow, Russia	Individual Women's Sabre	2nd
2016-03-25	Seoul, South Korea	Individual Women's Sabre	1st
2016-12-16	Cancún, Mexico	Individual Women's Sabre	1st
2017-03-31	Seoul, South Korea	Individual Women's Sabre	1st
2017-12-15	Cancún, Mexico	Individual Women's Sabre	3rd

=== World Cup ===
Date	Location	Event	Position
2011-03-11	Istanbul, Turkey	Individual Women's Sabre	3rd
2013-05-03	(United States) Chicago, Illinois	Individual Women's Sabre	3rd
2015-10-30	Orléans, France	Individual Women's Sabre	1st
2016-02-19	Sint-Niklaas, Belgium	Individual Women's Sabre	2nd
2017-05-12	Tunis, Tunisia	Individual Women's Sabre	3rd
2017-11-17	Sint-Niklaas, Belgium	Individual Women's Sabre	3rd
2019-03-22	Sint-Niklaas, Belgium	Individual Women's Sabre	3rd
2022-01-14	(Georgia (country)) Tbilisi, Georgia	Individual Women's Sabre	3rd

== Honours and awards ==
- Order of Honour (25 August 2016) – for high achievements at the 31st Olympic Games in Rio de Janeiro, Brazil, the will to win and goal-oriented approach.
- Medal "For Strengthening of Brotherhood in Arms" (2016).

== See also ==
- List of Olympic medalists in fencing (women)
- List of Youth Olympic Games gold medalists who won Olympic gold medals
