= Anne-Elizabeth Stone =

American fencer (born 1990)

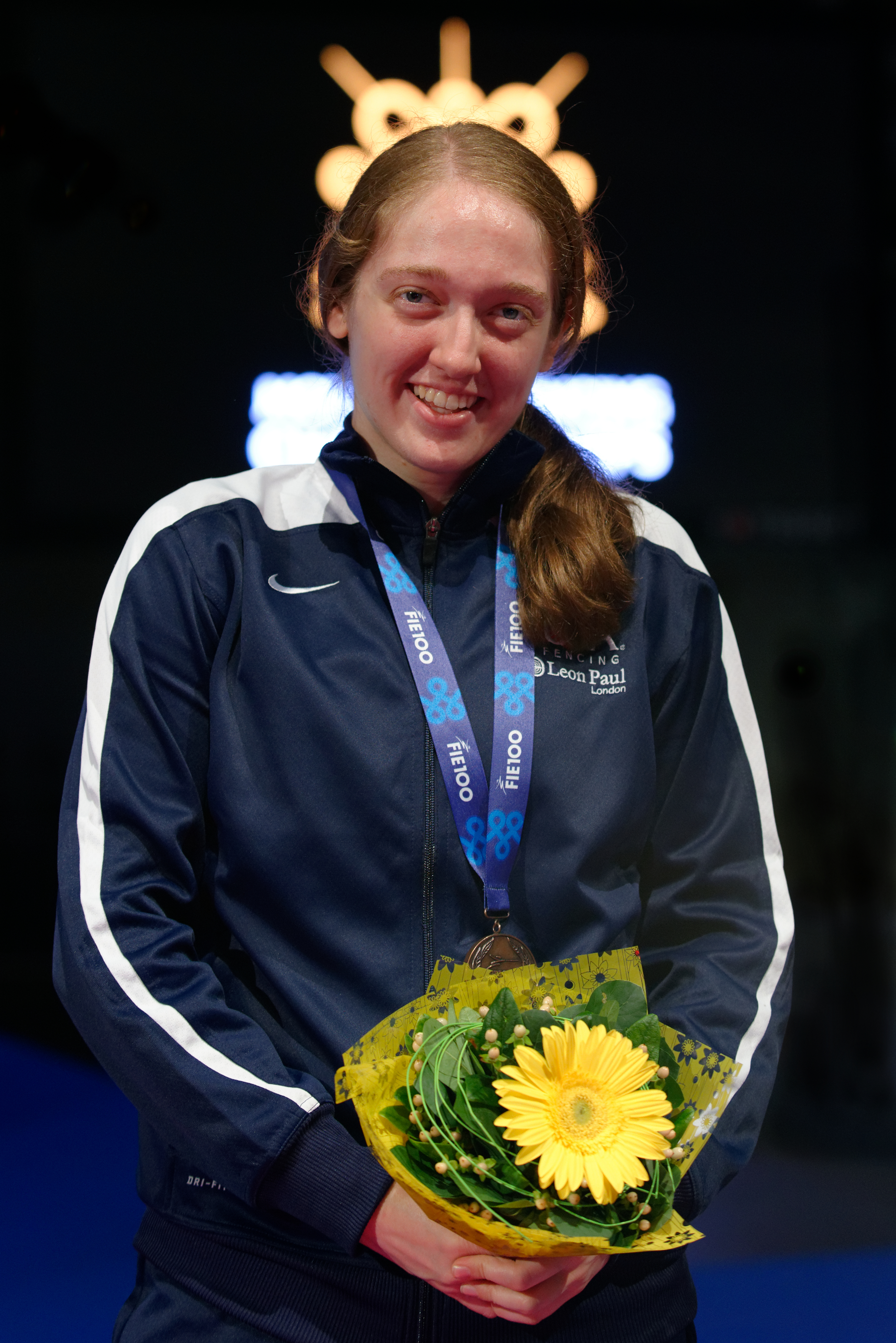
- Stone at the 2013 World Fencing Championships

Personal information
- Full name: Anne-Elizabeth Leigh Stone
- Born: December 31, 1990 (age 35) Oklahoma City, Oklahoma, United States
- Height: 5 ft 9 in (175 cm)
- Weight: 165 lb (75 kg)

Fencing career
- Sport: Fencing
- Weapon: Sabre
- Hand: right-handed
- National coach: Ed Korfanty
- Club: Princeton University
- Head coach: Oleg Stetsiv
- FIE ranking: current ranking
Medal record
World Championships
Gold medal – first place	2014 Kazan	Team
Bronze medal – third place	2013 Budapest	Team
Bronze medal – third place	2015 Moscow	Team
Bronze medal – third place	2018 Wuxi	Individual
Pan American Games
Gold medal – first place	2019 Lima	Individual
Gold medal – first place	2019 Lima	Team
Pan American Championships
Silver medal – second place	2013 Cartagena	Individual

Anne-Elizabeth Stone, commonly known as Eliza Stone, (born December 31, 1990) is an American sabre fencer. Her results include an individual bronze medal at the 2018 World Fencing Championships and a team gold medal in the 2014 World Championships.

== Career ==
Stone grew up fencing with her younger brother and sister in Chicago. She first took ballet lessons. She switched to fencing at the age of ten after her father saw a flier for a fencing club at a pizza parlor and thought it would be a good sport for his children. All three ended up fencing for Princeton University.

Stone joined the US national team in the 2012–13 season, during which she took the silver medal in the Pan American Championships after being defeated in the final by two-time Olympic champion Mariel Zagunis. In the 2013 World Championships at Budapest, she was stopped in the second round by Matylda Ostojska of Poland. In the team event, the United States defeated Belarus and Azerbaijan before being stopped in the semi-finals by Russia. They then topped Italy to earn the bronze medal.

The next season, Stone climbed her first World Cup podium in Dakar. A second bronze followed in the Moscow Grand Prix. In the 2014 World Championships at Kazan, Stone was stopped in the third round by Poland's Aleksandra Socha. In the team event, the United States prevailed over Kazakhstan, China, then Ukraine and met France in the final. They won 45–39 to take the gold medal.

At the 2018 World Fencing Championships in Wuxi, Stone finished with a bronze medal for her best individual result to date, falling in the semi-finals to eventual champion Sofia Pozdniakova. In January 2019, she achieved the No. 1 individual ranking in the United States for Women's Saber. In June 2019 she won her first gold medal at the Pan-American Games, and as a result achieved a career high ranking of 5th in the world.

Stone completed a BA (political science, 2013) at Princeton University.

She competed individually and in the team events at the United States in fencing at the 2020 Olympics in Tokyo. Teammates, included: Mariel Zagunis, Dagmara Wozniak, and Francesca Russo.

Stone commissioned as an officer in the US Navy Medical Corps in 2022 and is currently earning her medical doctorate from the Uniformed Services University of the Health Sciences.
