= Women's team sabre at the 2013 World Fencing Championships =

The Women's team sabre event of the 2013 World Fencing Championships was held on August 12, 2013.

== Medalists ==
Gold	Ukraine; Olha Kharlan; Alina Komashchuk; Halyna Pundyk; Olena Voronina
Silver	Russia; Yekaterina Dyachenko; Yana Egorian; Dina Galiakbarova; Yuliya Gavrilova
Bronze	United States; Ibtihaj Muhammad; Anne-Elizabeth Stone; Dagmara Wozniak; Mariel Zagunis

== Draw ==
=== Finals ===
Final
1	Ukraine	45
2	Russia	44

Third place
1	Italy	30
2	United States	45

=== Top half ===
Round of 32
Argentina	33
Kazakhstan	45
France	45
Australia	20
Chinese Taipei	45
Hong Kong	43
Mexico	45
Japan	30

Round of 16
Ukraine	45
Kazakhstan	20
France	42
China	45
Poland	45
Chinese Taipei	10
Mexico	27
Italy	45

Quarterfinals
Ukraine	45
China	31
Poland	41
Italy	45

Semifinals
Ukraine	45
Italy	34

=== Bottom half ===
Round of 32
Canada	39
Belarus	45
Azerbaijan	45
Brazil	25
Singapore	28
Germany	45
Spain	45
Venezuela	36

Round of 16
United States	45
Belarus	20
Azerbaijan	45
Hungary	38
South Korea	45
Germany	35
Spain	27
Russia	45

Quarterfinals
United States	45
Azerbaijan	33
South Korea	44
Russia	45

Semifinals
United States	33
Russia	45

=== Placement rounds ===
==== 5–8th place ====
5–8th place semifinals
China	44
Poland	45
Azerbaijan	39
South Korea	45

5th place
Poland	45
South Korea	34
7th place
China	40
Azerbaijan	45

==== 9–16th place ====
9–16th place quarterfinals
Kazakhstan	40
France	45
Chinese Taipei	36
Mexico	45
Belarus	25
Hungary	45
Germany	45
Spain	37

9–13th place semifinals
France	45
Mexico	38
Hungary	45
Germany	43

9th place
France	45
Hungary	22
11th place
Mexico	37
Germany	45

==== 13–16th place ====
13–16th place semifinals
Kazakhstan	45
Chinese Taipei	39
Belarus	35
Spain	45

13th place
Kazakhstan	41
Spain	45
15th place
Chinese Taipei	40
Belarus	45

== Final classification ==
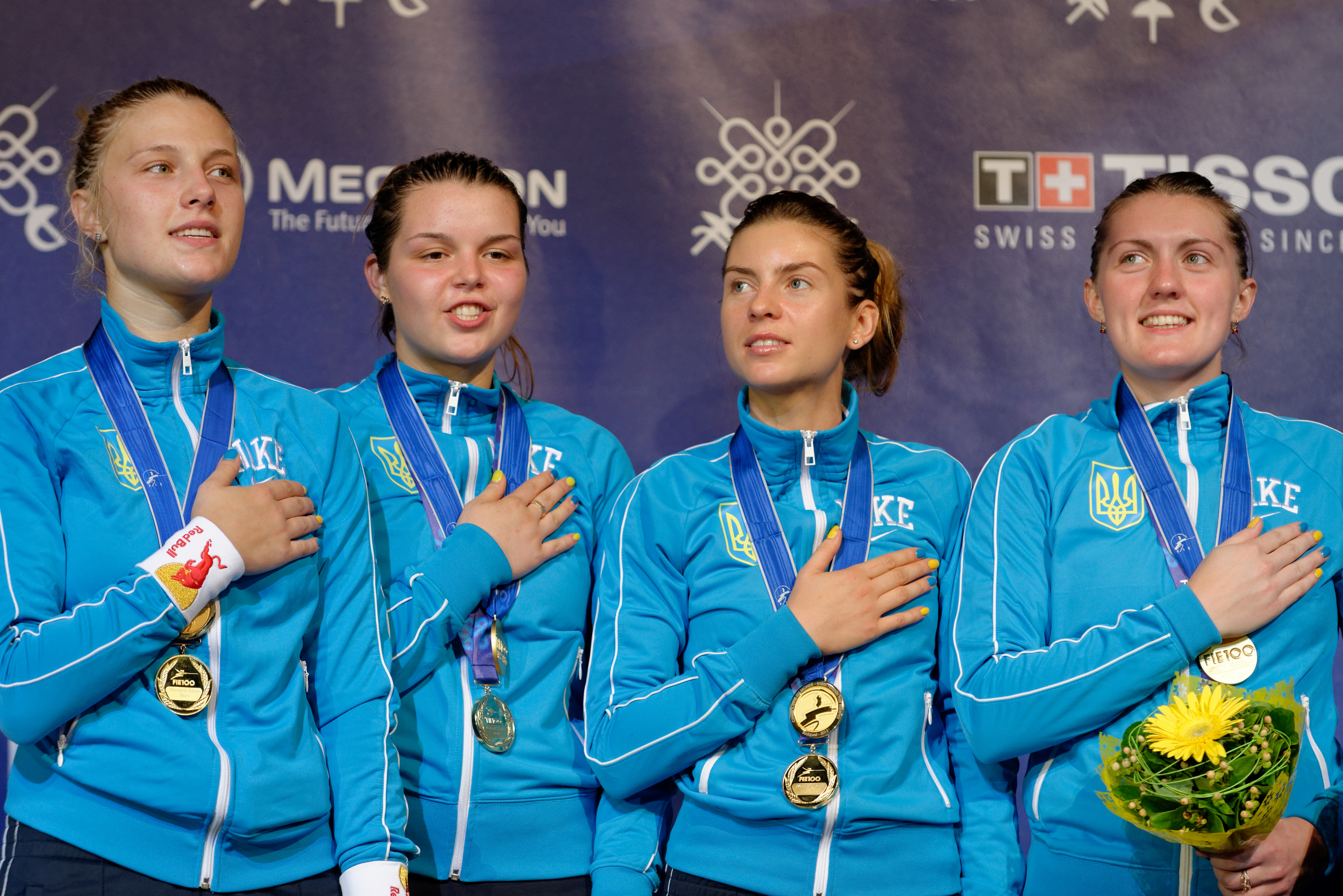
World team champion Ukraine sing their national anthem on the podium

Rank	Nation
1st place, gold medalist(s)	Ukraine
2nd place, silver medalist(s)	Russia
3rd place, bronze medalist(s)	United States
4	Italy
5	Poland
6	South Korea
7	Azerbaijan
8	China
9	France
10	Hungary
11	Germany
12	Mexico
13	Spain
14	Kazakhstan
15	Belarus
16	Chinese Taipei
17	Hong Kong
18	Argentina
19	Venezuela
20	Canada
21	Japan
22	Brazil
23	Singapore
24	Australia
