= Ibtihaj Muhammad =

American fencer

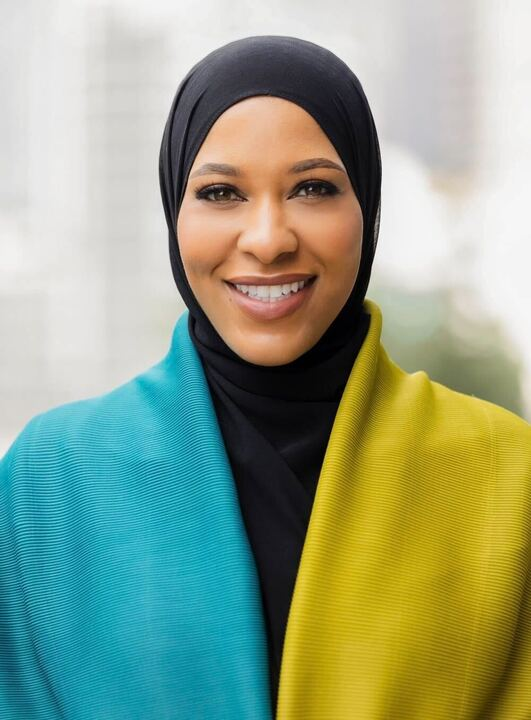

Personal information
- Born: December 4, 1985 (age 40) Maplewood, New Jersey, US
- Home town: Los Angeles, California, US
- Height: 1.70 m (5 ft 7 in)
- Weight: 68 kg (150 lb)

Fencing career
- Sport: Fencing
- Country: United States
- Weapon: Sabre
- Hand: Right
- Years on national team: 8
- National coach: Ed Korfanty
- Club: Peter Westbrook Foundation
- FIE ranking: Current ranking
Medal record
Olympic Games
Bronze medal – third place	2016 Rio de Janeiro	Team
World Championships
Gold medal – first place	2014 Kazan	Team
Bronze medal – third place	2011 Catania	Team
Bronze medal – third place	2012 Kyiv	Team
Bronze medal – third place	2013 Budapest	Team
Bronze medal – third place	2015 Moscow	Team
Pan American Games
Gold medal – first place	2011 Guadalajara	Team foil
Gold medal – first place	2011 Guadalajara	Team sabre
Gold medal – first place	2015 Toronto	Team sabre

Ibtihaj Muhammad (born December 4, 1985) is an American sabre fencer, author, entrepreneur and Olympic medalist. At the 2016 Summer Olympics, she became the first American woman to compete in the Olympics in hijab, the first American Muslim woman to win an Olympic medal, and the first Black woman to win an Olympic medal in the sabre event, when she won bronze in the women's saber team event.

Muhammad is a five-time World medalist (2011, 2012, 2013, 2015) and at the 2014 World Fencing Championships, won gold with the United States women's sabre team.

Muhammad was named one of Time 100's Most Influential People in the World (2016), is a sports ambassador for the United States Department of State and is a New York Times Bestselling author.

== Early life ==
Muhammad was born on December 4, 1985, in New Jersey and raised in Maplewood, New Jersey. She has two older siblings, Brandilyn and Qareeb, and two younger siblings, Asiya and Faizah. Her parents are of African American descent. Muhammad began fencing at age 13 at Columbia High School (New Jersey).

== Career ==
=== Fencing ===
In 2002, Muhammad joined the Peter Westbrook Foundation in New York City. After graduating from Columbia High School in 2003, Muhammad attended Duke University in Durham, North Carolina, where she was a three-time All-American. She graduated in 2007 with an International Relations and African & African-American Studies double major.

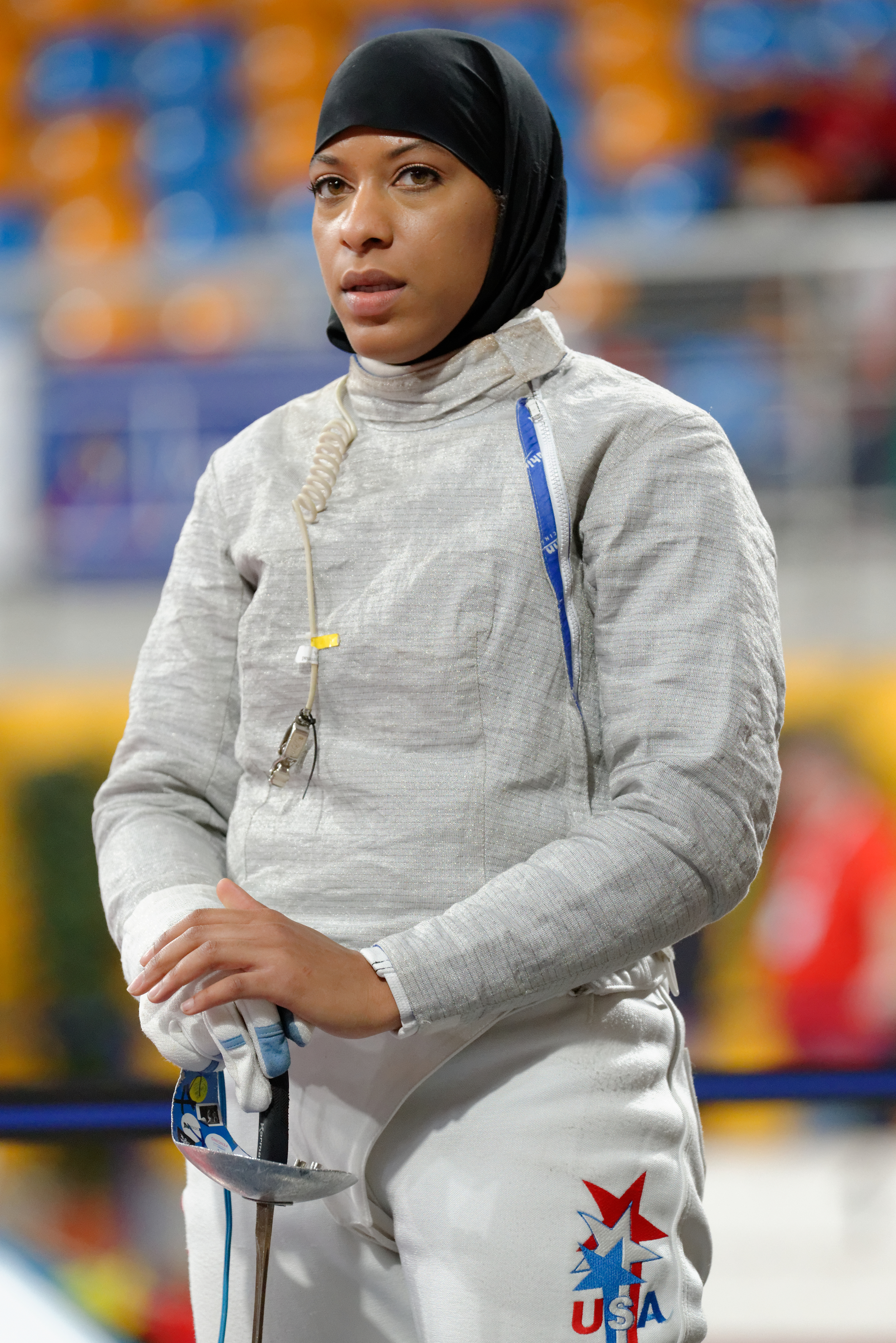
Muhammad in 2014

Muhammad qualified for her first United States National Fencing Team in 2010, becoming the first woman of color on the women's sabre team. She was a member of the United States National Team from 2010 to 2017. As of 2017, she is a two-time National Champion (2009, 2017), a 19-time World Cup medalist, and has ranked as high as No. 7 in the World. She is a five-time Senior World medalist (2011, 2012, 2013, 2015) and at the 2014 Fencing World Championships, won gold with the United States sabre team.

=== 2016 Summer Olympics ===
At the 2016 Summer Olympics, she became the first American woman to compete in the Olympics in hijab, the first Muslim-American woman to win an Olympic medal, and the first Black woman to win an Olympic medal in the sabre event, when she won bronze in the women's saber team event. The team defeated Italy 45–30 in the bronze medal match.

Visibly Muslim (due to her hijab), Muhammad became "one of the best symbols against intolerance America can ever have", according to The Guardian in 2016.

== Other activities ==
In 2014, Muhammad and her siblings launched a clothing company, Louella by Ibtihaj, which aims to bring modest fashionable clothing to the United States market. Muhammad is also a sports ambassador, serving on the U.S. Department of State’s Empowering Women and Girls Through Sport Initiative. She has traveled to various countries to engage in dialogue on the importance of sports and education.

In 2017, Mattel honored Muhammad as a Barbie “Shero,” a woman who has broken boundaries to inspire the next generation of girls, modeling the first hijabi and fencer Barbie in her likeness.

In 2019, Muhammad was recognized as a Global Ambassador for Special Olympics. She continues to support people with intellectual disabilities, including working with Special Olympics athletes during the 2025 Global Week of Inclusion to create designs as part of the unified Athlete Design Co_Lab.

=== Books ===
Muhammad released her debut memoir in 2018 titled Proud: My Fight for an Unlikely American Dream. She is also the author of a series of children's books— instant New York Times’ Best-seller The Proudest Blue: A Story of Hijab & Family (originally published in 2019), The Kindest Red: A Story of Hijab and Friendship (2023), and The Boldest White: A Story of Hijab & Community (2024). Her children's books have been finalists for the Forest of Reading's Blue Spruce Award twice, for The Proudest Blue in 2021 and The Kindest Red in 2024.

- Muhammad, Ibtihaj. (2018) Proud: My Fight for an Unlikely American Dream. New York: Hachette Books. ISBN 9780316518963
- Muhammad, Ibtihaj. (2018) (Young Readers Edition) Proud: Living My American Dream. New York: Little, Brown and Company. ISBN 9780316477000
- Muhammad, Ibtihaj. (2018) The Proudest Blue: A Story of Hijab and Family. New York: Little, Brown and Company. ISBN 9780316519007
- Muhammad, Ibtihaj. (2023) The Kindest Red: A Story of Hijab and Friendship. New York: Little, Brown and Company. ISBN 9780759555709
- Muhammad, Ibtihaj. (2024) The Boldest White: A Story of Hijab and Community. New York: Little, Brown and Company. ISBN 9780759555716

== See also ==
- Muslim women in sport
- List of USFA Division I National Champions
