= Małgorzata Kozaczuk =

Polish sabre fencer (born 1988)

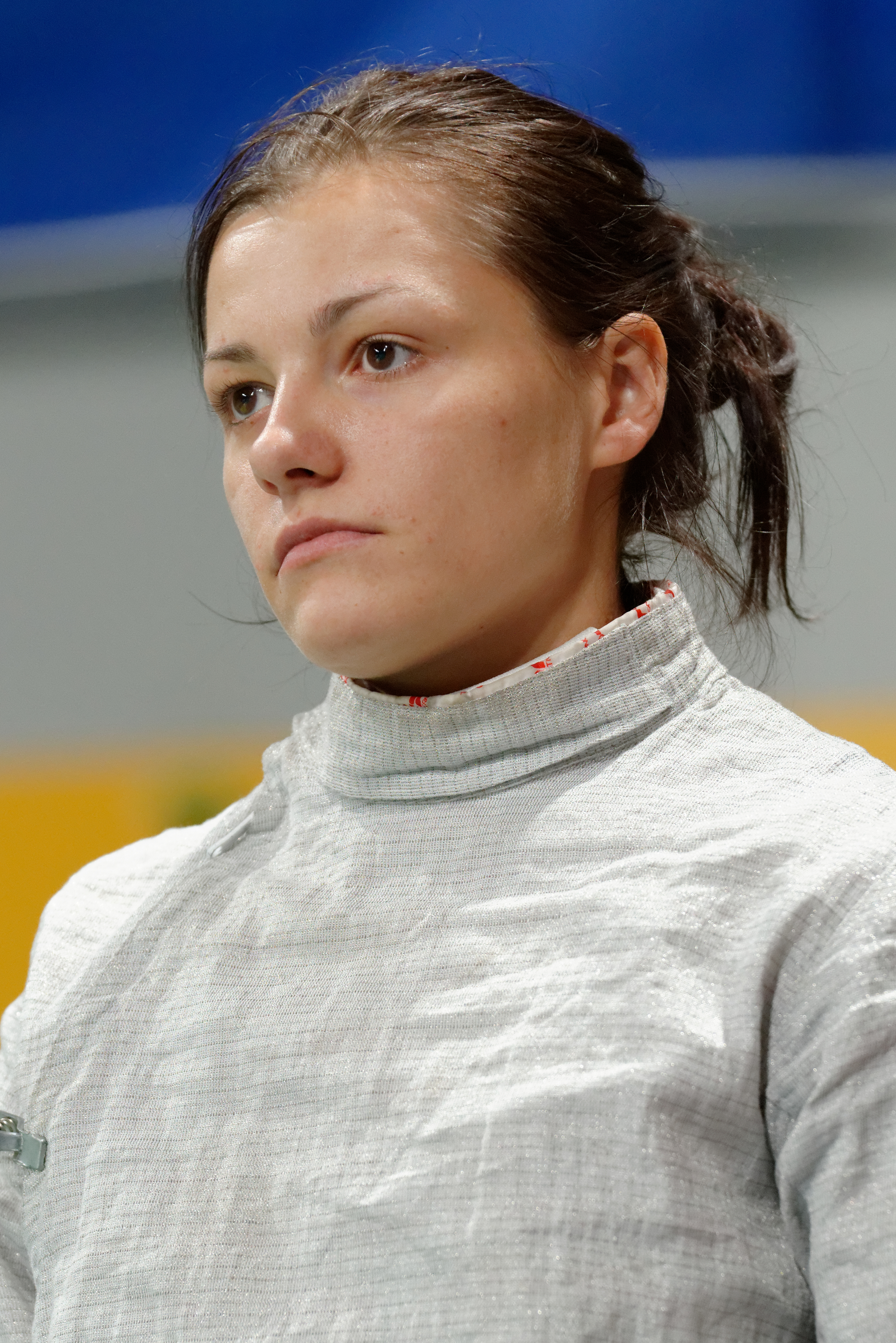

Personal information
- Born: 6 June 1988 (age 38) Warsaw, Poland
- Height: 1.70 m (5 ft 7 in)
- Weight: 60 kg (132 lb)

Fencing career
- Sport: Fencing
- Country: Poland
- Weapon: sabre
- Hand: left-handed
- FIE ranking: current ranking
Medal record
Military World Games
Bronze medal – third place	2019 Wuhan	Individual sabre

Małgorzata Kozaczuk (born 6 June 1988) is a Polish sabre fencer.

== Life ==
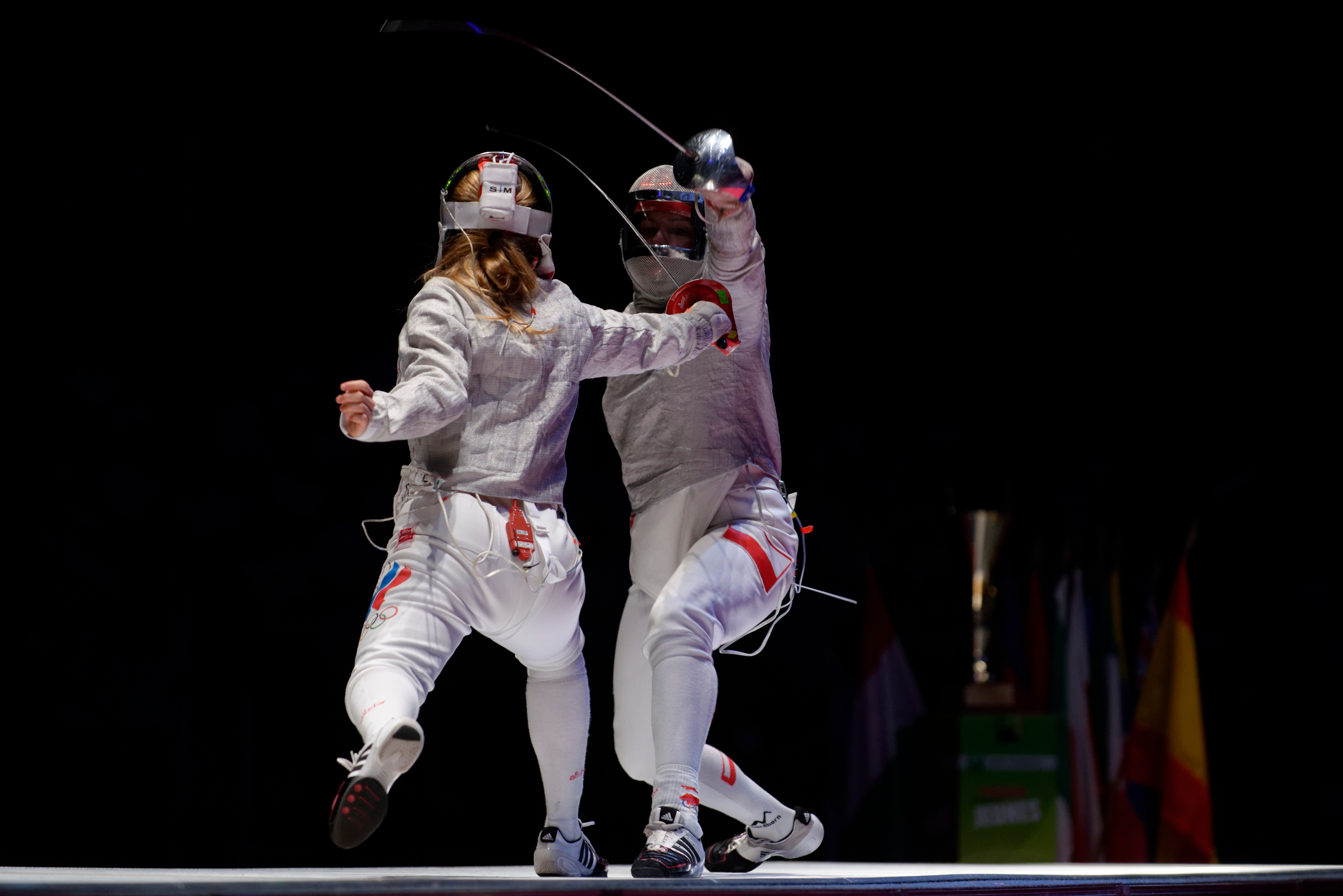
Kozaczuk at the 2014 Orleans Sabre Grand Prix

Kozaczuk was born in Warsaw in 1988. She represented her country at the 2016 Summer Olympics. She was also scheduled to complete in the sabre fencing team with Marta Puda, Alexsandra Socha and Bogna Jóźwiak.
