= Women's team sabre at the 2014 World Fencing Championships =

The Women's team sabre event of the 2014 World Fencing Championships was held on 20–21 July 2014.

== Medalists ==
Gold	United States; Ibtihaj Muhammad; Anne-Elizabeth Stone; Dagmara Wozniak; Mariel Zagunis
Silver	France; Cecilia Berder; Saoussen Boudiaf; Manon Brunet; Charlotte Lembach
Bronze	Ukraine; Olha Kharlan; Olena Kravatska; Olena Voronina; Olha Zhovnir

== Draw ==
=== Finals ===
Final
France	39
United States	45

Third place
Italy	42
Ukraine	45

=== Top half ===
Round of 32
Venezuela	44
Canada	45
Dominican Republic	31
Azerbaijan	45
Germany	45
Australia	23

Round of 16
Russia	45
Canada	28
Hungary	39
France	45
South Korea	45
Azerbaijan	33
Germany	35
Italy	45

Quarterfinals
Russia	41
France	45
South Korea	25
Italy	45

Semifinals
France	45
Italy	42

=== Bottom half ===
Round of 32
Argentina	39
Kazakhstan	45
Spain	45
Indonesia	27
Hong Kong	43
Japan	45

Round of 16
United States	45
Kazakhstan	22
Spain	42
China	45
Poland	45
Mexico	19
Japan	20
Ukraine	45

Quarterfinals
United States	45
China	43
Poland	39
Ukraine	45

Semifinals
United States	45
Ukraine	44

=== Placement rounds ===
==== 5–8th place ====
5–8th place semifinals
Russia	45
South Korea	44
China	43
Poland	45

5th place
Russia	45
Poland	27
7th place
South Korea	45
China	25

==== 9–16th place ====
9–16th place quarterfinals
Canada	18
Hungary	45
Azerbaijan	38
Germany	45
Kazakhstan	32
Spain	45
Mexico	30
Japan	45

9–12th place semifinals
Hungary	45
Germany	39
Spain	45
Japan	28

9th place
Hungary	45
Spain	38
11th place
Germany	45
Japan	41

==== 13–16th place ====
13–16th place semifinals
Canada	35
Azerbaijan	45
Kazakhstan	45
Mexico	44

13th place
Azerbaijan	33
Kazakhstan	45
15th place
Canada	41
Mexico	45

== Final classification ==
Rank	Nation
1st place, gold medalist(s)	United States
2nd place, silver medalist(s)	France
3rd place, bronze medalist(s)	Ukraine
4	Italy
5	Russia
6	Poland
7	South Korea
8	China
9	Hungary
10	Spain
11	Germany
12	Japan
13	Kazakhstan
14	Azerbaijan
15	Mexico
16	Canada
17	Hong Kong
18	Venezuela
19	Argentina
20	Australia
21	Dominican Republic
22	Indonesia
