= Dina Galiakbarova =

Russian fencer

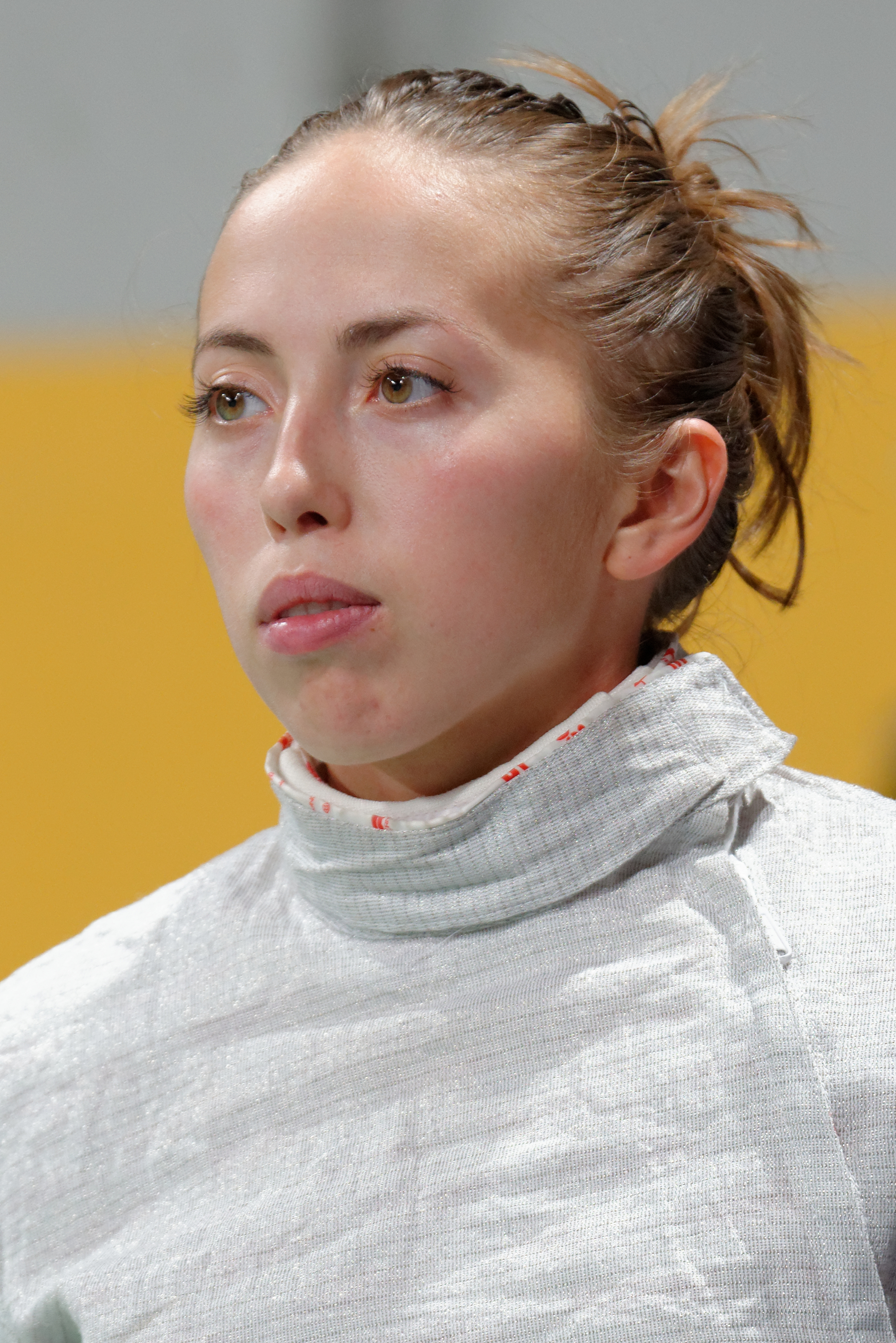

Personal information
- Full name: Dina Eduardovna Galiakbarova
- Born: 2 November 1991 (age 34) Bishkek, Kyrgyz Republic
- Height: 1.73 m (5 ft 8 in)
- Weight: 58 kg (128 lb)

Fencing career
- Sport: Fencing
- Weapon: Sabre
- Hand: Right-handed
- National coach: Christian Bauer
- FIE ranking: current ranking
Medal record
Representing Russia
World Championships
Gold medal – first place	2010 Paris	Team sabre
Gold medal – first place	2011 Catania	Team sabre
Gold medal – first place	2012 Kiev	Team sabre
Silver medal – second place	2013 Budapest	Team sabre
European Championships
Gold medal – first place	2012 Legnano	Team sabre
Gold medal – first place	2014 Strasbourg	Team sabre
Bronze medal – third place	2011 Sheffield	Team sabre

Dina Eduardovna Galiakbarova (Russian: Дина Эдуардовна Галиакбарова; born 2 November 1991) is a Russian sabre fencer, three-time world team champion (2010, 2011, and 2012) and twice European team champion (2010, 2011).

She was Junior European champion in 2010 at Lobnya, European U23 champion in 2011 at Kazan and Junior world champion the same year at the Dead Sea.

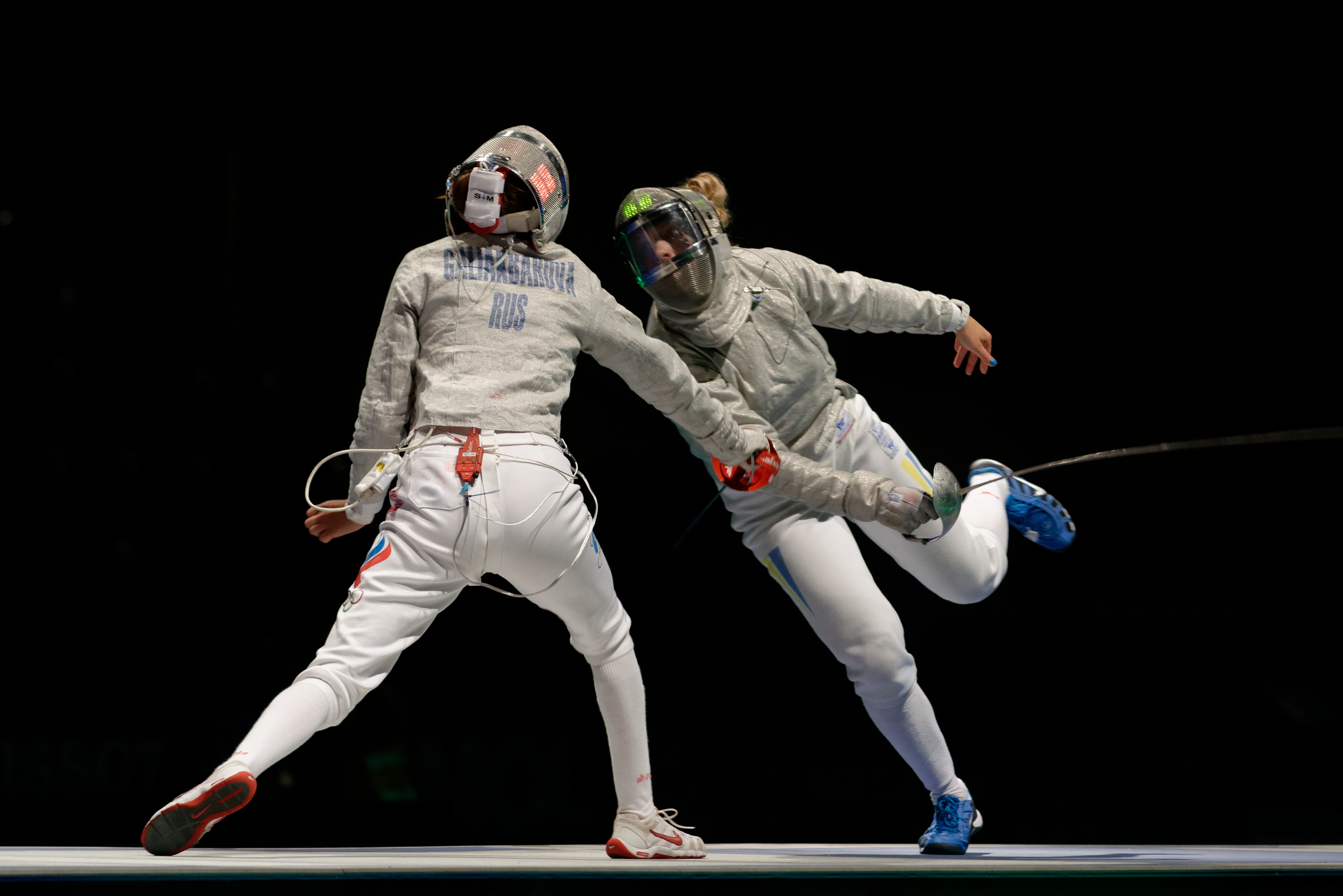
Ukrainian Olga Kharlan (R) scores against Galiakbarova in the women's team sabre final of the 2013 World Championships
