= Olena Kravatska =

Ukrainian fencer (born 1992)

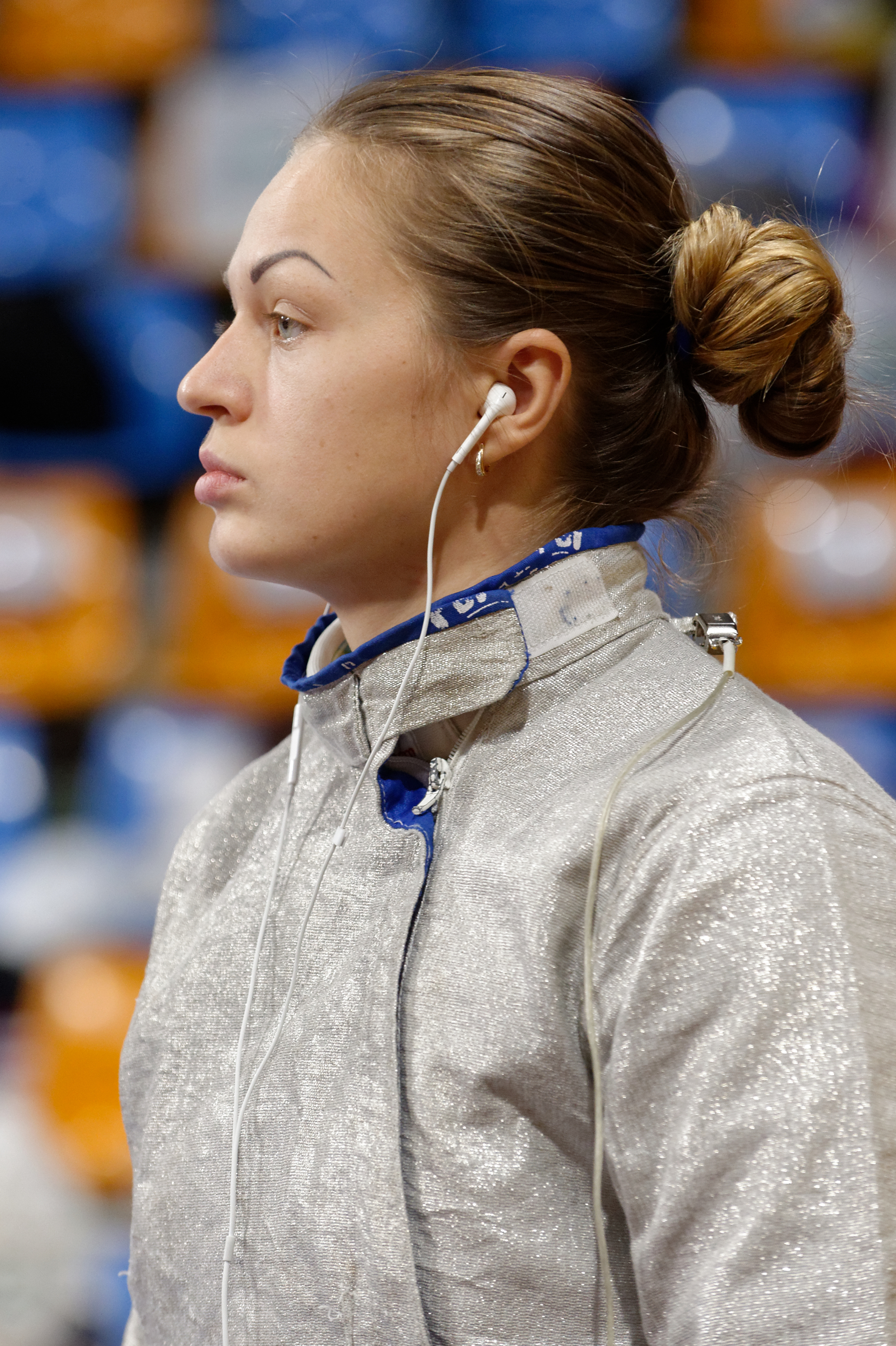
- Kravatska in 2015

Personal information
- Born: 22 June 1992 (age 34) Chernivtsi, Ukraine
- Height: 1.75 m (5 ft 9 in)
- Weight: 67 kg (148 lb)

Fencing career
- Sport: Fencing
- Weapon: Sabre
- Hand: right-handed
- National coach: Artem Skorokhod, Harnik Davydian
- Club: Central Sports Club of the Armed Forces
- Head coach: Oleksandr Vasyutin
- FIE ranking: current ranking
Medal record
Women's sabre
Representing Ukraine
Olympic Games
Gold medal – first place	2024 Paris	Team
Silver medal – second place	2016 Rio de Janeiro	Team
World Championships
Silver medal – second place	2015 Moscow	Team
Bronze medal – third place	2014 Kazan	Team
European Games
Gold medal – first place	2015 Baku	Team
European Championships
Silver medal – second place	2024 Basel	Team
Bronze medal – third place	2015 Montreux	Team
Bronze medal – third place	2022 Antalya	Team
Military World Games
Silver medal – second place	2019 Wuhan	Team

Olena Vitaliyivna Kravatska (Ukrainian: Олена Віталіївна Краватська; born 22 June 1992) is a Ukrainian sabre fencer. She is an Olympic champion and silver medallist in the team sabre event. Kravatska won the gold medal in the team sabre event at the 2024 Summer Olympics and the silver medal in the team sabre event at the 2016 Summer Olympics. She is also a World Championships silver and bronze medallist, European Games champion, and European Championships silver and two-time bronze medallist in the team sabre.

== Career ==
Kravatska won a silver medal in the 2010 Junior European Championships and a team gold medal that same year at the Junior World Championships.

In the 2013–14 season she took part in her first major senior competitions. At the 2014 European Championships in Strasbourg, she ranked 2nd after the pools and received a bye. She was then defeated in the table of 32 by Germany's Sibylle Klemm and finished 17th. At the 2014 World Championships in Kazan, she was defeated in the table of 64 by Olympic silver medalist Sofiya Velikaya. In the team event, she was selected as reserve into the Ukrainian team. The team first defeated Japan, then South Korea before falling 44–45 to the United States. Ukraine overcame Italy in the small final to earn a bronze medal.

In the 2014–15 season Kravatska climbed her first World Cup with a bronze medal in the Orléans World Cup.
