= Marta Puda =

Polish sabre fencer (born 1991)

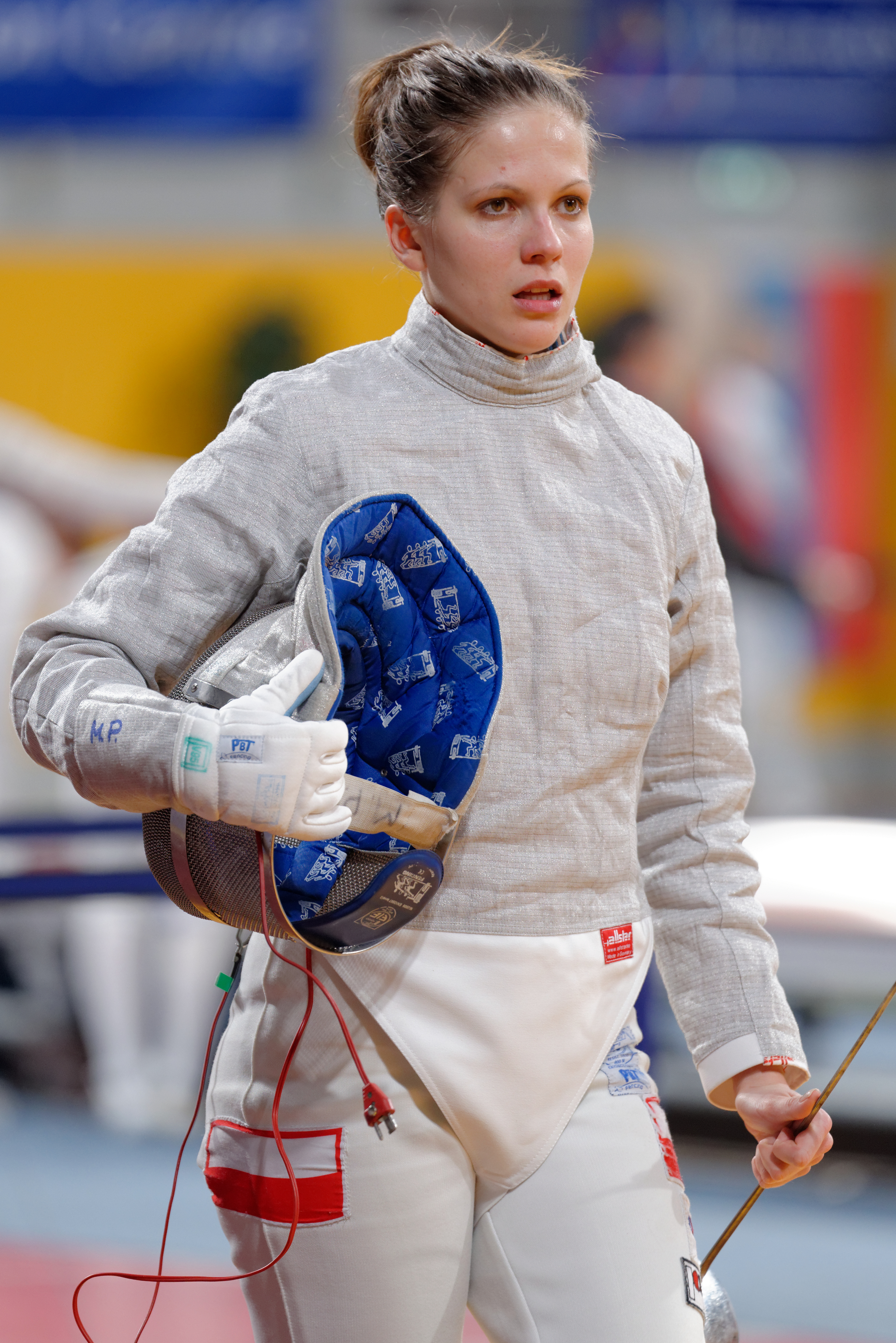

Personal information
- Born: 13 January 1991 (age 35) Będzin, Poland
- Height: 1.72 m (5 ft 8 in)
- Weight: 59 kg (130 lb)

Fencing career
- Sport: Fencing
- Country: Poland
- Weapon: sabre
- Hand: right-handed
- FIE ranking: current ranking
Medal record
European Championships
Bronze medal – third place	2018 Novi Sad	Individual

Marta Puda (born 13 January 1991) is a Polish sabre fencer who has competed at the international level, representing Poland in major fencing tournaments. She has participated in European and World Championships, showcasing her skills in the sport.
