= Dagmara Wozniak =

American fencer

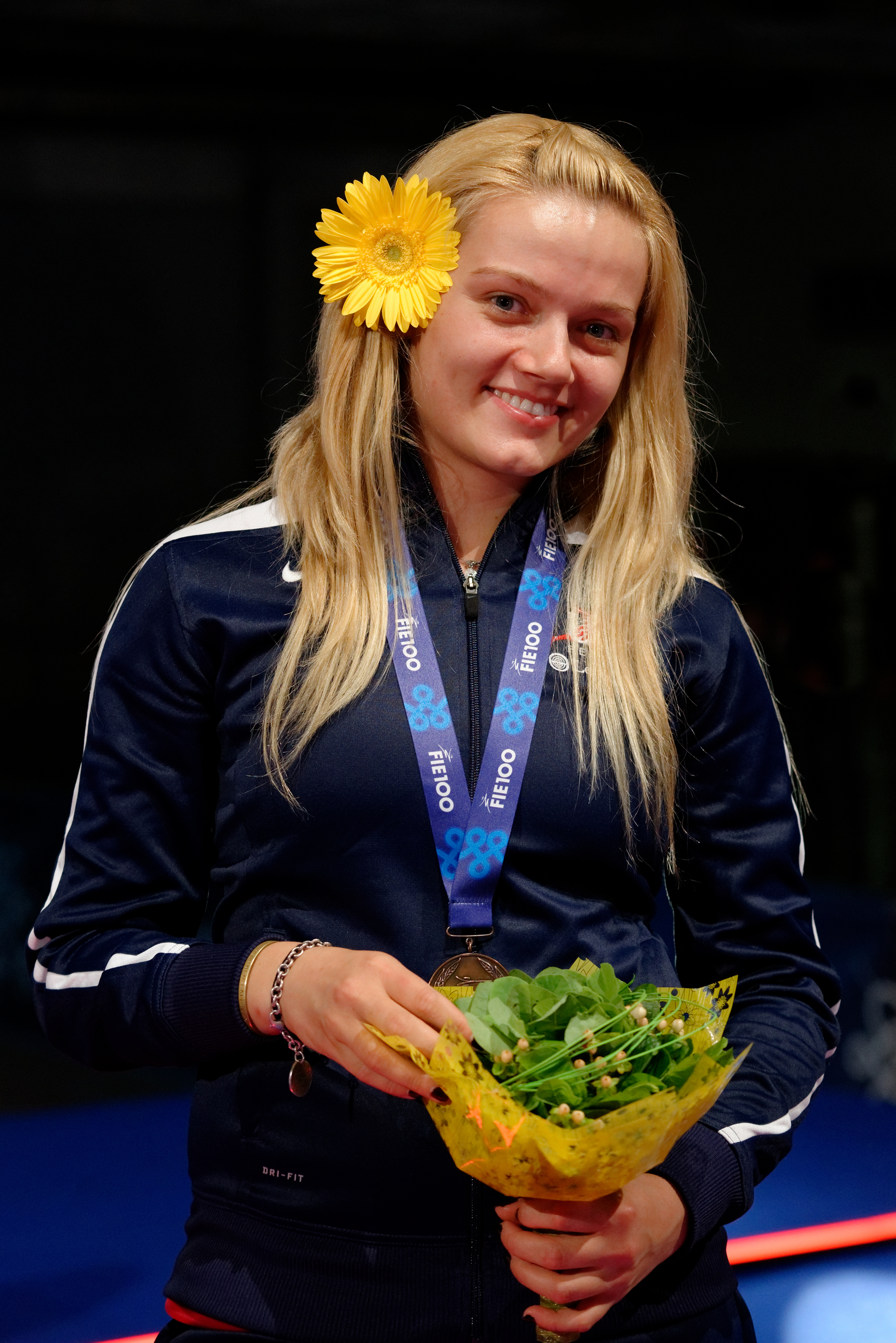
- Wozniak at the 2013 World Fencing Championships

Personal information
- Nickname: Daga
- Born: July 1, 1988 (age 38) Wrocław, Poland
- Height: 5 ft 8 in (173 cm)
- Weight: 180 lb (82 kg)

Fencing career
- Sport: Fencing
- Country: United States
- Weapon: Saber
- Club: Manhattan Fencing Center
- Head coach: Yury Gelman
- FIE ranking: Current ranking
Medal record
Women's fencing
Representing the United States
Olympic Games
Bronze medal – third place	2016 Rio de Janeiro	Team
World Championships
Gold medal – first place	2014 Kazan	Team
Bronze medal – third place	2011 Catania	Team
Bronze medal – third place	2013 Budapest	Team
Bronze medal – third place	2015 Moscow	Team

Dagmara "Daga" Wozniak (Polish: Woźniak; born July 1, 1988) is an American saber fencer. Wozniak was named to the U.S. Olympic team at the 2008 Summer Olympics in women's saber competition as a substitute, and as a competitor at the 2012 and 2016 Summer Olympics. As of the summer of 2016, she was ranked as one of the top 10 saber fencers in the world.

== Early life and education ==
Her parents are Gregory and Irena Wozniak and she has an older sister, Zuzanna. She was born in Wrocław, Poland. When Wozniak was one year old, she immigrated to the United States with her parents. The family settled in Avenel, New Jersey, Wozniak's hometown.

Wozniak graduated from Colonia High School in Woodbridge Township, New Jersey in 2006. She was the New Jersey high school sabre champion in 2005. She went on to attend St. John's University, where she majored in biology.

== Fencing career ==
Wozniak began fencing at age 9 at the Polish American Fencing School (PAFS) in Linden, New Jersey. She has trained at the Manhattan Fencing Center since high school, and her coach is Yury Gelman. She won three team medals at the Junior World Fencing Championships.

Wozniak was an Olympic alternate in the 2008 Olympic Games in Beijing but did not compete. She became a full member of the U.S. team at the 2012 Olympic Games and placed eighth, losing to Sofiya Velikaya of Russia in the quarterfinals by the score of 15–13. It was later revealed that she had fenced with a partially torn Achilles tendon.

After winning bronze medals in the team competition at the 2011 World Fencing Championships, and the 2012 and 2013 Senior World Championships, Wozniak won a gold medal with Team USA in 2014.

As of the summer of 2016, she was ranked among the top 10 saber fencers in the world. She represented the United States at the 2016 Summer Olympics in Rio de Janeiro. The team won a bronze medal.

She has qualified to represent the United States in fencing at the 2020 Olympics in Tokyo in 2021.
