= Women's sabre at the 2015 World Fencing Championships =

The Women's sabre event of the 2015 World Fencing Championships was held on 14 July 2015. The qualification was held on 13 July 2015.

== Medalists ==
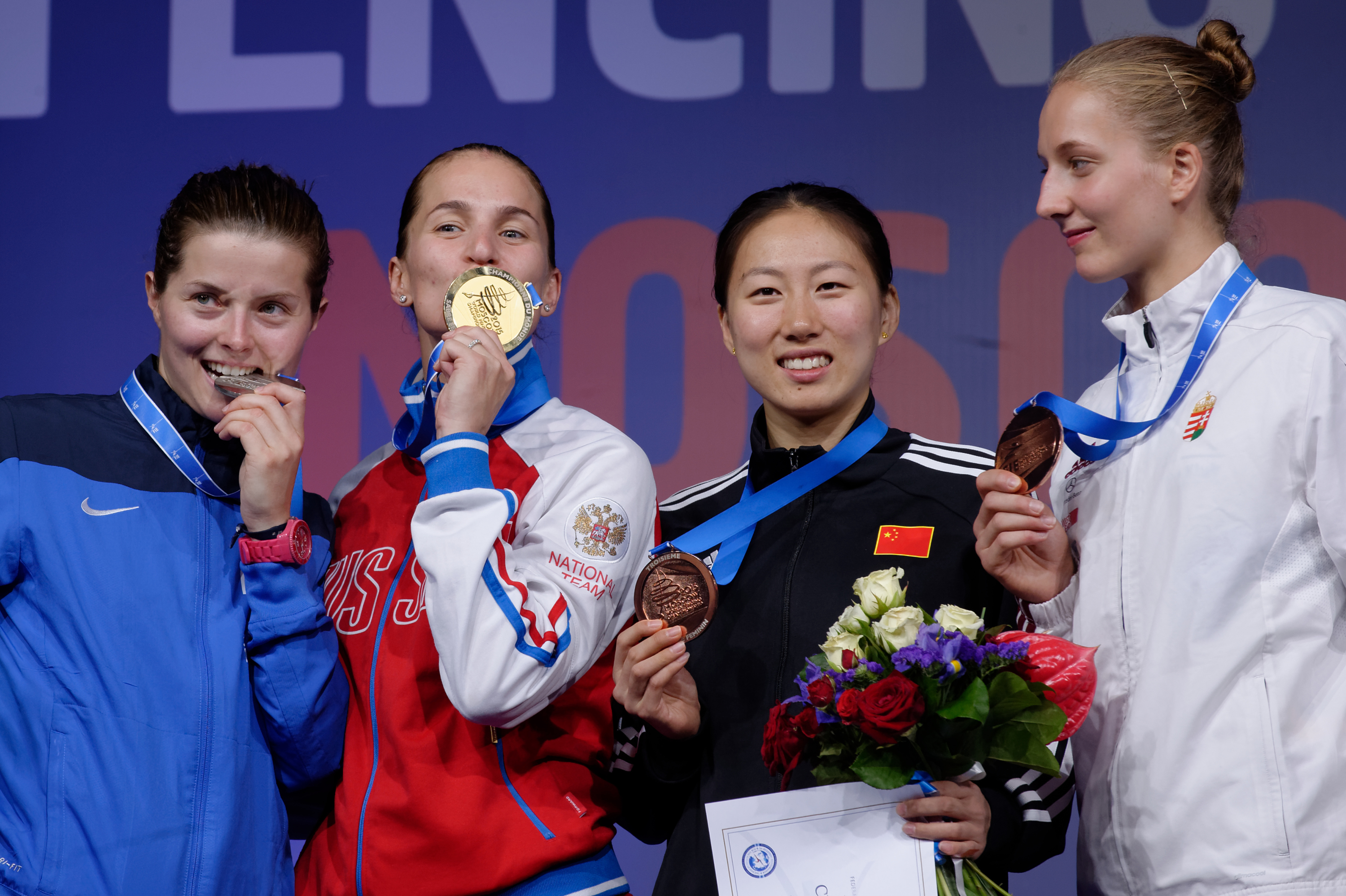
From left to right, Cécilia Berder, Sofiya Velikaya, Shen Chen and Anna Márton

Gold	(Russia) Sofiya Velikaya
Silver	(France) Cécilia Berder
Bronze	(China) Shen Chen
Bronze	(Hungary) Anna Márton

== Draw ==
=== Finals ===
Semi-finals
(France) Cécilia Berder	15
(China) Shen Chen	10
(Hungary) Anna Márton	8
(Russia) Sofiya Velikaya	15

Final
(France) Cécilia Berder	12
(Russia) Sofiya Velikaya	15

=== Top half ===
==== Section 1 ====
Round of 64
1	(Ukraine) Olha Kharlan	15
64	(Kazakhstan) Aibike Khabibullina	7
33	(Poland) Małgorzata Kozaczuk	15
32	(Japan) Norika Tamura	13
17	(Italy) Irene Vecchi	15
48	(Ukraine) Olena Voronina	12
49	(Mexico) Tania Arrayales	10
16	(France) Cécilia Berder	15
9	(South Korea) Kim Ji-yeon	15
56	(Bulgaria) Olga Hramova	4
41	(Dominican Republic) Rossy Félix Lara	10
24	(Vietnam) Nguyễn Thị Lệ Dung	15
25	(China) Yin Haiyun	13
40	(South Korea) Hwang Seo-na	15
57	(Mexico) Paola Pliego	15
8	(France) Charlotte Lembach	13

Round of 32
1	(Ukraine) Olha Kharlan	15
33	(Poland) Małgorzata Kozaczuk	9
17	(Italy) Irene Vecchi	11
16	(France) Cécilia Berder	15
9	(South Korea) Kim Ji-yeon	12
24	(Vietnam) Nguyễn Thị Lệ Dung	15
40	(South Korea) Hwang Seo-na	15
57	(Mexico) Paola Pliego	14

Round of 16
1	(Ukraine) Olha Kharlan	10
16	(France) Cécilia Berder	15
24	(Vietnam) Nguyễn Thị Lệ Dung	10
40	(South Korea) Hwang Seo-na	15

Quarterfinals
16	(France) Cécilia Berder	15
40	(South Korea) Hwang Seo-na	8

==== Section 2 ====
Round of 64
5	(Russia) Yekaterina Dyachenko	15
60	(Japan) Mika Kikuchi	10
37	(Russia) Yuliya Gavrilova	15
28	(Georgia (country)) Teodora Kakhiani	2
21	(Azerbaijan) Sevil Bunyatova	15
44	(Hong Kong) Au Sin Ying	11
53	(Germany) Alexandra Bujdoso	11
12	(Tunisia) Azza Besbes	15
13	(China) Shen Chen	15
52	(Hungary) Nora Garam	1
45	(Venezuela) Alejandra Benítez	6
20	(Italy) Ilaria Bianco	15
29	(United States) Anne-Elizabeth Stone	15
36	(Italy) Loreta Gulotta	9
61	(Hong Kong) Jenny Ho Siu In	12
4	(Russia) Yana Egorian	15

Round of 32
5	(Russia) Yekaterina Dyachenko	12
37	(Russia) Yuliya Gavrilova	15
21	(Azerbaijan) Sevil Bunyatova	11
12	(Tunisia) Azza Besbes	15
13	(China) Shen Chen	15
20	(Italy) Ilaria Bianco	10
29	(United States) Anne-Elizabeth Stone	8
4	(Russia) Yana Egorian	15

Round of 16
37	(Russia) Yuliya Gavrilova	13
12	(Tunisia) Azza Besbes	15
13	(China) Shen Chen	15
4	(Russia) Yana Egorian	10

Quarterfinals
12	(Tunisia) Azza Besbes	12
13	(China) Shen Chen	15

=== Bottom half ===
==== Section 3 ====
Round of 64
3	(United States) Mariel Zagunis	15
62	(Hungary) Anna Várhelyi	6
35	(Canada) Gabriella Page	15
30	(Mexico) Úrsula González	14
19	(Azerbaijan) Sabina Mikina	6
46	(China) Shao Yaqi	15
51	(Belarus) Palina Kaspiarovich	8
14	(Hungary) Anna Márton	15
11	(Greece) Vassiliki Vougiouka	15
54	(France) Manon Brunet	9
43	(Germany) Anna Limbach	15
22	(France) Saoussen Boudiaf	7
27	(Venezuela) Milagros Pastran	14
38	(Spain) Laia Vila	15
59	(Kazakhstan) Tamara Pochekutova	13
6	(United States) Dagmara Wozniak	15

Round of 32
3	(United States) Mariel Zagunis	15
35	(Canada) Gabriella Page	7
46	(China) Shao Yaqi	13
14	(Hungary) Anna Márton	15
11	(Greece) Vassiliki Vougiouka	15
43	(Germany) Anna Limbach	10
38	(Spain) Laia Vila	12
6	(United States) Dagmara Wozniak	15

Round of 16
3	(United States) Mariel Zagunis	9
14	(Hungary) Anna Márton	15
11	(Greece) Vassiliki Vougiouka	15
6	(United States) Dagmara Wozniak	14

Quarterfinals
14	(Hungary) Anna Márton	15
11	(Greece) Vassiliki Vougiouka	12

==== Section 4 ====
Round of 64
7	(Italy) Rossella Gregorio	15
58	(Hong Kong) Chang Karen Ngai Hing	10
39	(Poland) Bogna Jóźwiak	13
26	(Ukraine) Alina Komashchuk	15
23	(Spain) Araceli Navarro	15
42	(Romania) Bianca Pascu	13
55	(China) Qian Jiarui	13
10	(Poland) Aleksandra Socha	15
15	(United States) Ibtihaj Muhammad	15
50	(Poland) Angelika Wątor	11
47	(Greece) Marina Paizi	8
18	(South Korea) Yoon Ji-su	15
31	(Argentina) Belén Pérez Maurice	7
34	(Ukraine) Olena Kravatska	15
63	(South Korea) Lee Ra-jin	4
2	(Russia) Sofiya Velikaya	15

Round of 32
7	(Italy) Rossella Gregorio	14
26	(Ukraine) Alina Komashchuk	15
23	(Spain) Araceli Navarro	8
10	(Poland) Aleksandra Socha	15
15	(United States) Ibtihaj Muhammad	15
18	(South Korea) Yoon Ji-su	14
34	(Ukraine) Olena Kravatska	7
2	(Russia) Sofiya Velikaya	15

Round of 16
26	(Ukraine) Alina Komashchuk	11
10	(Poland) Aleksandra Socha	15
15	(United States) Ibtihaj Muhammad	8
2	(Russia) Sofiya Velikaya	15

Quarterfinals
10	(Poland) Aleksandra Socha	4
2	(Russia) Sofiya Velikaya	15
