= Women's sabre at the 2011 World Fencing Championships =

The Women's sabre event of the 2011 World Fencing Championships took place on October 12, 2011.

== Medalists ==
Gold	Sofiya Velikaya (RUS)
Silver	Mariel Zagunis (USA)
Bronze	Yuliya Gavrilova (RUS)
Bronze	Olha Kharlan (UKR)

== Draw ==
=== Finals ===
Semi-finals
(United States) Mariel Zagunis	15
(Russia) Yuliya Gavrilova	8
(Russia) Sofiya Velikaya	15
(Ukraine) Olha Kharlan	7

Final
(United States) Mariel Zagunis	14
(Russia) Sofiya Velikaya	15

=== Top half ===
==== Section 1 ====
Round of 64
(United States) Mariel Zagunis	15
(Romania) Elena Munteanu	11
(United Kingdom) Louise Bond-Williams	14
(Brazil) Karina Lakerbai	15
(China) Chen Xiaodong	10
(Japan) Seira Nakayama	15
(Italy) Paola Guarneri	15
(United States) Daria Schneider	10
(Italy) Irene Vecchi	15
(Belarus) Volha Kisialiova	8
(Romania) Bianca Pascu	0
(Germany) Stefanie Kubissa	0
(Hungary) Réka Benkó	15
(Dominican Republic) Rossy Félix	9
(Vietnam) Nguyễn Thị Lệ Dung	15
(Poland) Aleksandra Socha	12

Round of 32
(United States) Mariel Zagunis	15
(Brazil) Karina Lakerbai	7
(Japan) Seira Nakayama	15
(Italy) Paola Guarneri	8
(Italy) Irene Vecchi	15
(Germany) Stefanie Kubissa	10
(Hungary) Réka Benkó	13
(Vietnam) Nguyễn Thị Lệ Dung	15

Round of 16
(United States) Mariel Zagunis	15
(Japan) Seira Nakayama	9
(Italy) Irene Vecchi	15
(Vietnam) Nguyễn Thị Lệ Dung	3

Quarterfinals
(United States) Mariel Zagunis	15
(Italy) Irene Vecchi	7

==== Section 2 ====
Round of 64
(Russia) Yekaterina Dyachenko	15
(Azerbaijan) Sevil Bunyatova	4
(Germany) Anna Limbach	15
(Greece) Marina Paizi	7
(France) Léonore Perrus	15
(Hong Kong) Fong Yi Tak	7
(Israel) Petra Palffy	4
(Italy) Gioia Marzocca	15
(United States) Ibtihaj Muhammad	12
(Spain) Sandra Marcos	15
(Canada) Gabriella Page	8
(France) Marion Stoltz	15
(Hong Kong) Au Sin Ying	12
(China) Liu Shan	15
(Iceland) Gudrun Jóhannsdóttir	10
(Russia) Yuliya Gavrilova	15

Round of 32
(Russia) Yekaterina Dyachenko	15
(Germany) Anna Limbach	9
(France) Léonore Perrus	12
(Italy) Gioia Marzocca	15
(Spain) Sandra Marcos	5
(France) Marion Stoltz	15
(China) Liu Shan	11
(Russia) Yuliya Gavrilova	15

Round of 16
(Russia) Yekaterina Dyachenko	15
(Italy) Gioia Marzocca	9
(France) Marion Stoltz	9
(Russia) Yuliya Gavrilova	15

Quarterfinals
(Russia) Yekaterina Dyachenko	9
(Russia) Yuliya Gavrilova	15

=== Bottom half ===
==== Section 3 ====
Round of 64
(Russia) Sofiya Velikaya	15
(South Korea) Kim Seon-hee	10
(Ukraine) Halyna Pundyk	15
(Venezuela) Alejandra Benítez	12
(Azerbaijan) Aida Alasgarova	15
(Turkey) Iryna Kravchuk	10
(United Kingdom) Chrystall Nicoll	10
(Poland) Bogna Jóźwiak	15
(South Korea) Kim Ji-yeon	15
(Germany) Alexandra Bujdoso	10
(South Korea) Lee Ra-jin	12
(Greece) Vassiliki Vougiouka	15
(Azerbaijan) Sabina Mikina	15
(Panama) Eileen Grench	8
(Poland) Irena Więckowska	15
(Ukraine) Olena Khomrova	8

Round of 32
(Russia) Sofiya Velikaya	15
(Ukraine) Halyna Pundyk	10
(Azerbaijan) Aida Alasgarova	5
(Poland) Bogna Jóźwiak	15
(South Korea) Kim Ji-yeon	10
(Greece) Vassiliki Vougiouka	15
(Azerbaijan) Sabina Mikina	15
(Poland) Irena Więckowska	10

Round of 16
(Russia) Sofiya Velikaya	15
(Poland) Bogna Jóźwiak	12
(Greece) Vassiliki Vougiouka	13
(Azerbaijan) Sabina Mikina	15

Quarterfinals
(Russia) Sofiya Velikaya	15
(Azerbaijan) Sabina Mikina	9

==== Section 4 ====
Round of 64
(Tunisia) Azza Besbes	15
(United Kingdom) Sophie Williams	7
(Ukraine) Olha Zhovnir	15
(France) Carole Vergne	13
(United Kingdom) Joanna Hutchison	9
(Spain) Araceli Navarro	15
(Venezuela) Patricia Contreras	8
(China) Zhu Min	15
(United States) Dagmara Wozniak	15
(Bulgaria) Margarita Tschomakova	9
(Argentina) Belén Pérez Maurice	8
(Russia) Dina Galiakbarova	15
(Kazakhstan) Yuliya Zhivitsa	10
(South Korea) Kim Keum-hwa	15
(Spain) Laia Vila	4
(Ukraine) Olha Kharlan	15

Round of 32
(Tunisia) Azza Besbes	15
(Ukraine) Olha Zhovnir	9
(Spain) Araceli Navarro	10
(China) Zhu Min	15
(United States) Dagmara Wozniak	15
(Russia) Dina Galiakbarova	13
(South Korea) Kim Keum-hwa	11
(Ukraine) Olha Kharlan	15

Round of 16
(Tunisia) Azza Besbes	14
(China) Zhu Min	15
(United States) Dagmara Wozniak	10
(Ukraine) Olha Kharlan	15

Quarterfinals
(China) Zhu Min	7
(Ukraine) Olha Kharlan	15
