= Women's sabre at the 2013 World Fencing Championships =

International sporting competition

The Women's sabre event of the 2013 World Fencing Championships was held on August 9, 2013, while its qualification round, was held on August 6, 2013.

== Medalists ==
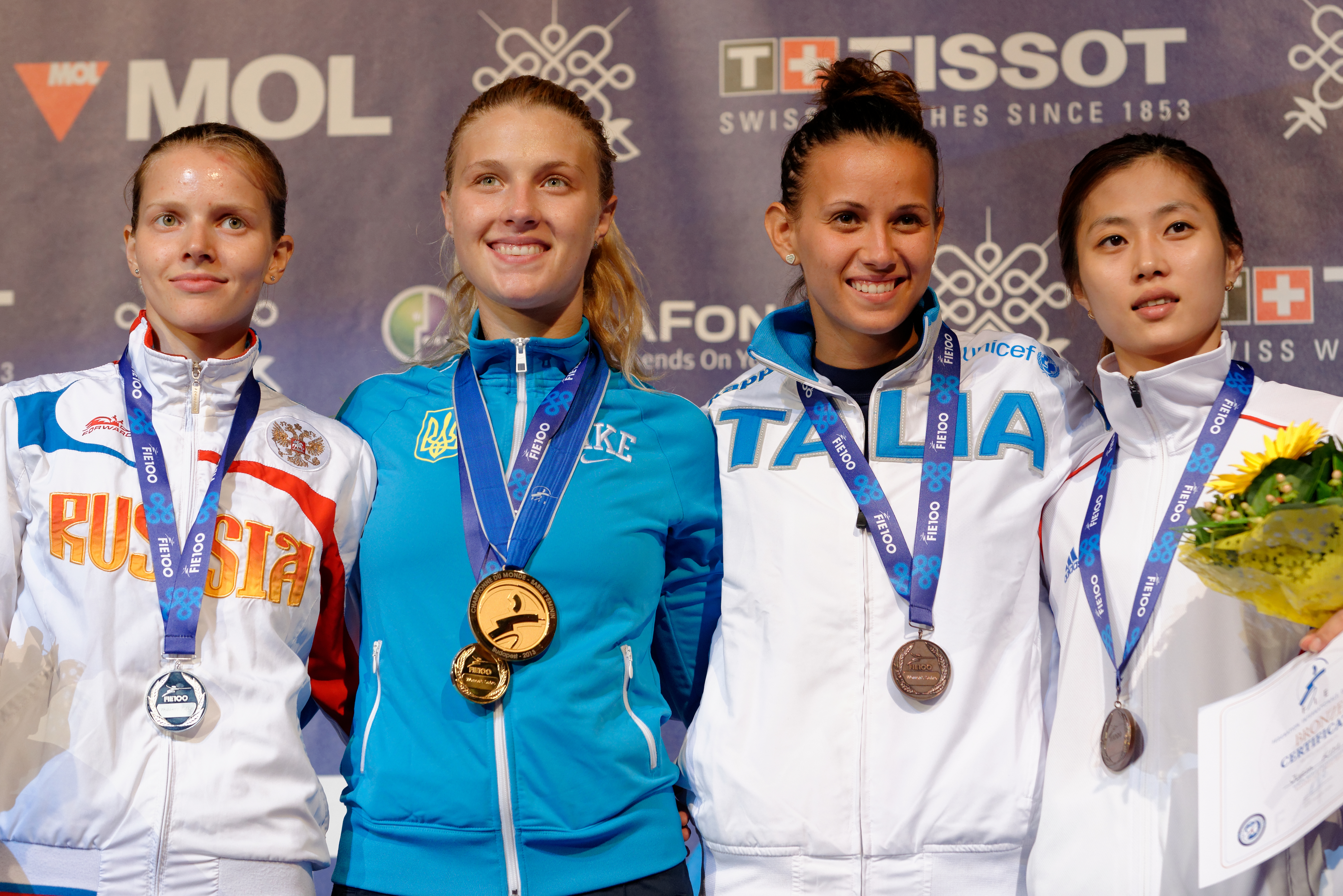
On the podium: from left to right, Yekaterina Dyachenko, Olha Kharlan, Irene Vecchi, and Kim Ji-yeon

Gold	Olha Kharlan (UKR)
Silver	Yekaterina Dyachenko (RUS)
Bronze	Kim Ji-yeon (KOR)
Bronze	Irene Vecchi (ITA)

== Draw ==
=== Finals ===
Semi-finals
19:20
(Ukraine) Olha Kharlan	15
(South Korea) Kim Ji-yeon	14
19:40
(Italy) Irene Vecchi	12
(Russia) Yekaterina Dyachenko	15

Final
20:55
(Ukraine) Olha Kharlan	15
(Russia) Yekaterina Dyachenko	12

=== Top half ===
==== Section 1 ====
Round of 64
1	(Ukraine) Olha Kharlan	15
64	(Pakistan) Hareem Ahmad	2
33	(Poland) Marta Puda	15
32	(Spain) Laia Vila	8
17	(Ukraine) Alina Komashchuk	9
48	(China) Qian Jianmei	15
49	(Italy) Livia Stagni	12
16	(Venezuela) Alejandra Benítez	15
9	(Russia) Dina Galiakbarova	7
56	(Spain) Sandra Marcos	15
41	(Hungary) Anna Várhelyi	15
24	(Germany) Sibylle Klemm	13
25	(France) Charlotte Lembach	8
40	(France) Béline Boulay	15
57	(Romania) Mihaela Bulică	10
8	(United States) Dagmara Wozniak	15

Round of 32
1	(Ukraine) Olha Kharlan	15
33	(Poland) Marta Puda	7
48	(China) Qian Jianmei	7
16	(Venezuela) Alejandra Benítez	15
56	(Spain) Sandra Marcos	14
41	(Hungary) Anna Várhelyi	15
40	(France) Béline Boulay	15
8	(United States) Dagmara Wozniak	12

Round of 16
1	(Ukraine) Olha Kharlan	15
16	(Venezuela) Alejandra Benítez	3
41	(Hungary) Anna Várhelyi	15
40	(France) Béline Boulay	7

Quarterfinals
1	(Ukraine) Olha Kharlan	15
41	(Hungary) Anna Várhelyi	11

==== Section 2 ====
Round of 64
5	(Poland) Aleksandra Socha	15
60	(China) Zhang Xueqian	4
37	(South Korea) Kim Ara	4
28	(Spain) Araceli Navarro	15
21	(Romania) Bianca Pascu	15
44	(Mexico) Julieta Toledo	12
53	(Ukraine) Halyna Pundyk	15
12	(Tunisia) Azza Besbes	11
13	(United States) Ibtihaj Muhammad	15
52	(Azerbaijan) Sevil Bunyatova	14
45	(Kazakhstan) Yuliya Zhivitsa	8
20	(South Korea) Yoon Ji-su	15
29	(France) Cécilia Berder	15
36	(Italy) Rossella Gregorio	13
61	(Brazil) Elora Ugo	6
4	(South Korea) Kim Ji-yeon	15

Round of 32
5	(Poland) Aleksandra Socha	15
28	(Spain) Araceli Navarro	11
21	(Romania) Bianca Pascu	13
53	(Ukraine) Halyna Pundyk	15
13	(United States) Ibtihaj Muhammad	13
20	(South Korea) Yoon Ji-su	15
29	(France) Cécilia Berder	13
4	(South Korea) Kim Ji-yeon	15

Round of 16
5	(Poland) Aleksandra Socha	15
53	(Ukraine) Halyna Pundyk	12
20	(South Korea) Yoon Ji-su	9
4	(South Korea) Kim Ji-yeon	15

Quarterfinals
5	(Poland) Aleksandra Socha	11
4	(South Korea) Kim Ji-yeon	15

=== Bottom half ===
==== Section 3 ====
Round of 64
3	(Italy) Irene Vecchi	15
62	(Japan) Mami Itoh	6
35	(Belarus) Volha Kisialiova	13
30	(Poland) Katarzyna Kedziora	15
19	(Hungary) Anna Márton	15
46	(Azerbaijan) Sabina Mikina	14
51	(Germany) Alexandra Bujdoso	8
14	(China) Zhu Min	15
11	(South Korea) Lee Ra-jin	15
54	(Germany) Stefanie Kubissa	9
43	(Panama) Eileen Grench	15
22	(Canada) Sandra Sassine	9
27	(Germany) Anna Limbach	12
38	(Russia) Yana Egorian	15
59	(Hong Kong) Lam Hin Wai	2
6	(Greece) Vassiliki Vougiouka	15

Round of 32
3	(Italy) Irene Vecchi	15
30	(Poland) Katarzyna Kedziora	11
19	(Hungary) Anna Márton	9
14	(China) Zhu Min	15
11	(South Korea) Lee Ra-jin	15
43	(Panama) Eileen Grench	13
38	(Russia) Yana Egorian	8
6	(Greece) Vassiliki Vougiouka	15

Round of 16
3	(Italy) Irene Vecchi	15
14	(China) Zhu Min	12
11	(South Korea) Lee Ra-jin	14
6	(Greece) Vassiliki Vougiouka	15

Quarterfinals
3	(Italy) Irene Vecchi	15
6	(Greece) Vassiliki Vougiouka	13

==== Section 4 ====
Round of 64
7	(Russia) Yekaterina Dyachenko	15
58	(Japan) Erika Hirose	6
39	(Hungary) Réka Benkó	12
26	(Argentina) María Belén Pérez Maurice	15
23	(Mexico) Paola Pliego	15
42	(Azerbaijan) Sevinj Bunyatova	13
55	(Italy) Ilaria Bianco	2
10	(Russia) Yuliya Gavrilova	15
15	(United States) Anne-Elizabeth Stone	15
50	(Ukraine) Olena Voronina	9
47	(Hong Kong) Ho Siu In Jenny	6
18	(Poland) Matylda Ostojska	15
31	(France) Saoussen Boudiaf	15
34	(Mexico) Ursula Gonzalez Garate	9
63	(Canada) Marissa Ponich	4
2	(United States) Mariel Zagunis	15

Round of 32
7	(Russia) Yekaterina Dyachenko	15
26	(Argentina) María Belén Pérez Maurice	9
23	(Mexico) Paola Pliego	6
10	(Russia) Yuliya Gavrilova	15
15	(United States) Anne-Elizabeth Stone	11
18	(Poland) Matylda Ostojska	15
31	(France) Saoussen Boudiaf	5
2	(United States) Mariel Zagunis	15

Round of 16
7	(Russia) Yekaterina Dyachenko	15
10	(Russia) Yuliya Gavrilova	12
18	(Poland) Matylda Ostojska	8
2	(United States) Mariel Zagunis	15

Quarterfinals
7	(Russia) Yekaterina Dyachenko	15
2	(United States) Mariel Zagunis	14

== Final classification ==
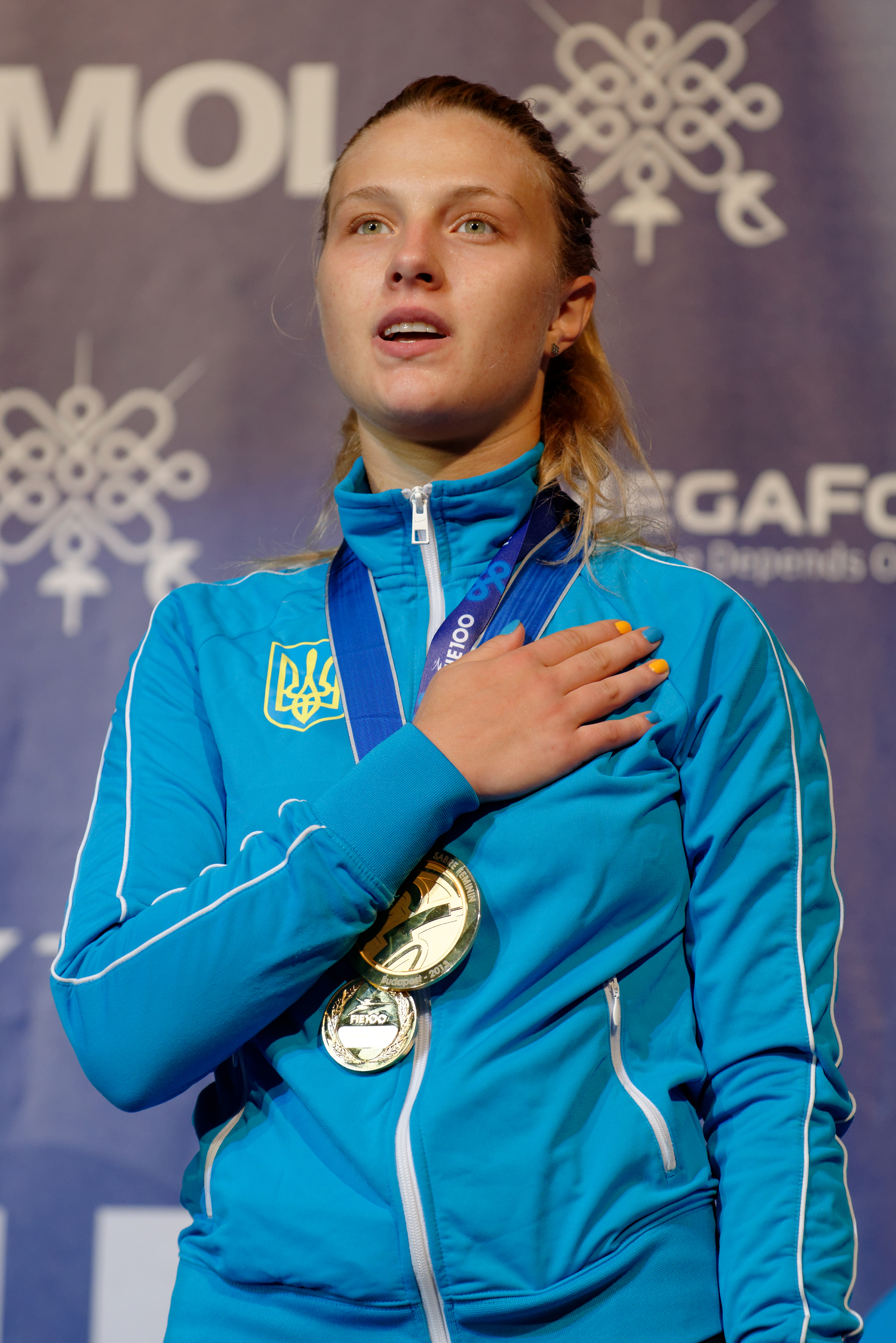
2013 World Champion Olha Kharlan sings her national anthem on the podium

Rank	Athlete	Nation
1st place, gold medalist(s)	Olha Kharlan	Ukraine
2nd place, silver medalist(s)	Yekaterina Dyachenko	Russia
3rd place, bronze medalist(s)	Kim Ji-yeon	South Korea
3rd place, bronze medalist(s)	Irene Vecchi	Italy
5	Mariel Zagunis	United States
6	Vassiliki Vougiouka	Greece
7	Aleksandra Socha	Poland
8	Anna Várhelyi	Hungary
9	Yuliya Gavrilova	Russia
10	Lee Ra-jin	South Korea
11	Zhu Min	China
12	Alejandra Benítez	Venezuela
13	Matylda Ostojska	Poland
14	Yoon Ji-su	South Korea
15	Béline Boulay	France
16	Halyna Pundyk	Ukraine
17	Dagmara Wozniak	United States
18	Ibtihaj Muhammad	United States
19	Anne-Elizabeth Stone	United States
20	Anna Márton	Hungary
21	Bianca Pascu	Romania
22	Paola Pliego	Mexico
23	María Belén Pérez Maurice	Argentina
24	Araceli Navarro	Spain
25	Cecilia Berder	France
25	Katarzyna Kedziora	Poland
27	Saoussen Boudiaf	France
28	Marta Puda	Poland
29	Yana Egorian	Russia
30	Eileen Grench	Panama
31	Qian Jianmei	China
32	Sandra Marcos	Spain
33	Dina Galiakbarova	Russia
34	Azza Besbes	Tunisia
35	Alina Komashchuk	Ukraine
36	Sandra Sassine	Canada
37	Sibylle Klemm	Germany
38	Charlotte Lembach	France
39	Anna Limbach	Germany
40	Laia Vila	Spain
41	Ursula González Garate	Mexico
42	Rossella Gregorio	Italy
42	Volha Kisialhova	Belarus
44	Kim Ara	South Korea
45	Réka Benkó	Hungary
46	Sevinj Bunyatova	Azerbaijan
47	Julieta Toledo	Mexico
48	Yuliya Zhivitsa	Kazakhstan
49	Sabina Mikina	Azerbaijan
50	Ho Siu In Jenny	Hong Kong
51	Livia Stagni	Italy
52	Olena Voronina	Ukraine
53	Alexandra Bujdoso	Germany
54	Sevil Bunyatova	Azerbaijan
55	Stefanie Kubissa	Germany
56	Ilaria Bianco	Italy
57	Mihaela Bulică	Romania
58	Erika Hirose	Japan
59	Lam Hin Wai	Hong Kong
59	Zhang Xueqian	China
61	Elora Ugo	Brazil
62	Mami Itoh	Japan
63	Marissa Ponich	Canada
64	Hareem Ahmad	Pakistan
65	Au Yeung Wai Sum	Hong Kong
66	Vanessa Infante	Mexico
67	Tatyana Prikhodko	Kazakhstan
68	Darya Andreyeva	Belarus
69	Dóra Varga	Hungary
70	Lee Ann Huimin	Singapore
71	Caitlin Taylor	Australia
72	Fatima Tobar	El Salvador
73	Chika Aoki	Japan
74	Gabriella Page	Canada
75	Marta Baeza Centurión	Brazil
76	Aida Alasgarova	Azerbaijan
77	Maho Hamada	Japan
78	Hanna Ivanishchanka	Belarus
78	Tamara Pochekutova	Kazakhstan
80	Chen Yu-Ling	Chinese Taipei
81	Lin Yi-Chun	Chinese Taipei
82	Olga Hramova	Bulgaria
83	Thorbjörg Ágústsdóttir	Iceland
84	Patricia Contreras	Venezuela
85	Chantel Helwer	Canada
86	Tuğçe Simay Koç	Turkey
87	Marina Paizi	Greece
88	Palina Kaspiarovich	Belarus
89	Lucia Martín-Portugues	Spain
90	Aibike Khabibullina	Kazakhstan
91	Estefania Emilse Berninsone	Argentina
92	Zoi Vahlas	Greece
93	Chelsea Taylor	Australia
94	Bhavani Devi Chadalavada Anandha Sundhararaman	India
95	Klára Hanzlíková	Czech Republic
96	Au Sin Ying	Hong Kong
96	Mariliz Herrera	Venezuela
98	Petra Pálffy	Israel
99	Giulia Gasparin	Brazil
100	Adriana Attar Cohen	Argentina
101	Wu Kuei-Chih	Chinese Taipei
102	Ariunzara Yundendorj	Mongolia
103	Cheung Sharmaine En-Qi	Singapore
104	Iryna Ayşe Kravchuk	Turkey
105	Yam Felicia Hui Tse	Singapore
106	Begümhan Bilgin	Turkey
106	Milagros Pastran	Venezuela
108	Cheryl Chan	Australia
