= Fencing at the 2016 Summer Olympics – Women's sabre =

Women's sabre at the Games of the XXXI Olympiad
- Venue: Carioca Arena 3
- Date: 8 August 2016
- Competitors: 36 from 20 nations

Medalists
1st place, gold medalist(s)		Yana Egorian	Russia
2nd place, silver medalist(s)		Sofiya Velikaya	Russia
3rd place, bronze medalist(s)		Olha Kharlan	Ukraine

The women's sabre competition in fencing at the 2016 Summer Olympics in Rio de Janeiro was held on 8 August at the Carioca Arena 3. Russia's Yana Egorian won the gold medal over compatriot Sofiya Velikaya, and Ukraine's Olha Kharlan won the bronze medal.

The medals were presented by Irena Szewińska, IOC member, Poland and Stanislav Pozdnyakov, President of the European Fencing Confederation and Russian Olympic Committee.

== Results ==
=== Finals ===
Semi-finals
Sofiya Velikaya (RUS)	15
Manon Brunet (FRA)	14
Yana Egorian (RUS)	15
Olha Kharlan (UKR)	9

Final
Sofiya Velikaya (RUS)	14
Yana Egorian (RUS)	15
Bronze medal match
Manon Brunet (FRA)	10
Olha Kharlan (UKR)	15

=== Top half ===
==== Section 1 ====
Round of 64
Marta Baeza (BRA) (retired)	2
Bogna Jóźwiak (POL)	4

Round of 32
Sofiya Velikaya (RUS)	15
Bogna Jóźwiak (POL)	5
Charlotte Lembach (FRA)	15
Irene Vecchi (ITA)	11
Cécilia Berder (FRA)	15
María Belén Pérez Maurice (ARG)	6
Olena Kravatska (UKR)	13
Ibtihaj Muhammad (USA)	15

Round of 16
Sofiya Velikaya (RUS)	15
Charlotte Lembach (FRA)	14
Cécilia Berder (FRA)	15
Ibtihaj Muhammad (USA)	12

Quarter-finals
Sofiya Velikaya (RUS)	15
Cécilia Berder (FRA)	10

==== Section 2 ====
Round of 64
Alejandra Benítez (VEN)	15
Nada Hafez (EGY)	11

Round of 32
Shen Chen (CHN)	9
Małgorzata Kozaczuk (POL)	15
Sabina Mikina (AZE)	12
Azza Besbes (TUN)	15
Hwang Seon-a (KOR)	11
Manon Brunet (FRA)	15
Alejandra Benítez (VEN)	14
Anna Márton (HUN)	15

Round of 16
Małgorzata Kozaczuk (POL)	12
Azza Besbes (TUN)	15
Manon Brunet (FRA)	15
Anna Márton (HUN)	12

Quarter-finals
Azza Besbes (TUN)	14
Manon Brunet (FRA)	15

=== Bottom half ===
==== Section 3 ====
Round of 64
Chika Aoki (JPN)	5
Eileen Grench (PAN)	15

Round of 32
Mariel Zagunis (USA)	15
Eileen Grench (PAN)	4
Yekaterina Dyachenko (RUS)	15
Seo Ji-yeon (KOR)	12
Vassiliki Vougiouka (GRE)	15
Dagmara Wozniak (USA)	8
Tania Arrayales (MEX)	7
Yana Egorian (RUS)	15

Round of 16
Mariel Zagunis (USA)	12
Yekaterina Dyachenko (RUS)	15
Vassiliki Vougiouka (GRE)	11
Yana Egorian (RUS)	15

Quarter-finals
Yekaterina Dyachenko (RUS)	10
Yana Egorian (RUS)	15

==== Section 4 ====
Round of 64
Úrsula González (MEX)	15
Julieta Toledo (MEX)	11

Round of 32
Kim Ji-yeon (KOR)	15
Nguyễn Thị Lệ Dung (VIE)	3
Loreta Gulotta (ITA)	15
Aleksandra Socha (POL)	10
Rossella Gregorio (ITA)	14
Alina Komashchuk (UKR)	15
Úrsula González (MEX)	8
Olha Kharlan (UKR)	15

Round of 16
Kim Ji-yeon (KOR)	13
Loreta Gulotta (ITA)	15
Alina Komashchuk (UKR)	8
Olha Kharlan (UKR)	15

Quarter-finals
Loreta Gulotta (ITA)	4
Olha Kharlan (UKR)	15

== Final classification ==
Rank	Fencer	Country
1st place, gold medalist(s)	Yana Egorian	Russia
2nd place, silver medalist(s)	Sofya Velikaya	Russia
3rd place, bronze medalist(s)	Olga Kharlan	Ukraine
4	Manon Brunet	France
5	Cecilia Berder	France
6	Azza Besbes	Tunisia
7	Ekaterina Dyachenko	Russia
8	Loreta Gulotta	Italy
9	Mariel Zagunis	United States
10	Anna Marton	Hungary
11	Kim Ji-yeon	South Korea
12	Ibtihaj Muhammad	United States
13	Vassiliki Vougiouka	Greece
14	Charlotte Lembach	France
15	Alina Komashchuk	Ukraine
16	Malgorzata Kozaczuk	Poland
17	Shen Chen	China
18	Aleksandra Socha	Poland
19	Hwang Seon-a	South Korea
20	Seo Ji-yeon	South Korea
21	Rossella Gregorio	Italy
22	Irene Vecchi	Italy
23	Sabina Mikina	Azerbaijan
24	Dagmara Wozniak	United States
25	María Belén Pérez Maurice	Argentina
26	Olena Kravatska	Ukraine
27	Nguyễn Thị Lệ Dung	Vietnam
28	Tania Arrayales	Mexico
29	Alejandra Benítez	Venezuela
30	Eileen Grench	Panama
31	Úrsula González	Mexico
32	Bogna Jozwiak	Poland
33	Marta Baeza	Brazil
34	Julieta Toledo	Mexico
35	Chika Aoki	Japan
36	Nada Hafez	Egypt
