= Fencing at 2013 World Combat Games – Women's Sabre Individual =

The Women's Sabre event at the 2013 World Combat Games was held in Saint Petersburg, Russia on 25 October.

== Medalists ==
Gold	Silver	Bronze
Kim Ji-yeon (KOR)	Lee Ra-jin (KOR)	Yekaterina Dyachenko (RUS)

== Athlete list ==
- (Egypt) Mennatalla Ahmed
- (Venezuela) Alejandra Benítez
- (France) Cécilia Berder
- (Italy) Ilaria Bianco
- (Russia) Yekaterina Dyachenko
- (Russia) Dina Galiakbarova
- (South Korea) Kim Ji-yeon
- (South Korea) Lee Ra-jin
- (France) Charlotte Lembach
- (United States) Ibtihaj Muhammad
- (Argentina) María Belén Pérez Maurice
- (Poland) Aleksandra Socha
- (Italy) Irene Vecchi
- (Greece) Vassiliki Vougiouka
- (United States) Mariel Zagunis
- (China) Min Zhu

== Results ==
Round of 16
(Egypt) Mennatalla Ahmed	4
(South Korea) Kim Ji-yeon	15
(Russia) Dina Galiakbarova	15
(Venezuela) Alejandra Benítez	7
(China) Min Zhu	11
(Greece) Vassiliki Vougiouka	15
(Italy) Irene Vecchi	13
(France) Charlotte Lembach	15
(France) Cécilia Berder	9
(Russia) Yekaterina Dyachenko	15
(United States) Ibtihaj Muhammad	13
(South Korea) Lee Ra-jin	15
(Poland) Aleksandra Socha	15
(Italy) Ilaria Bianco	13
(United States) Mariel Zagunis	15
(Argentina) María Belén Pérez Maurice	5

Quarterfinals
(South Korea) Kim Ji-yeon	15
(Russia) Dina Galiakbarova	4
(Greece) Vassiliki Vougiouka	15
(France) Charlotte Lembach	5
(South Korea) Lee Ra-jin	15
(United States) Mariel Zagunis	14
(Russia) Yekaterina Dyachenko	15
(Poland) Aleksandra Socha	14

Semifinals
(South Korea) Kim Ji-yeon	15
(Greece) Vassiliki Vougiouka	10
(Russia) Yekaterina Dyachenko	13
(South Korea) Lee Ra-jin	15

Final
(South Korea) Kim Ji-yeon	15
(South Korea) Lee Ra-jin	11

Third place
(Greece) Vassiliki Vougiouka	11
(Russia) Yekaterina Dyachenko	15
