= Fencing at the 2012 Summer Olympics – Women's sabre =

Women's sabre at the Games of the XXX Olympiad
- Venue: ExCeL Exhibition Centre
- Date: 1 August
- Competitors: 32 from 24 nations

Medalists
1st place, gold medalist(s)		Kim Ji-yeon	South Korea
2nd place, silver medalist(s)		Sofiya Velikaya	Russia
3rd place, bronze medalist(s)		Olha Kharlan	Ukraine

The women's individual sabre competition in fencing at the 2012 Olympic Games in London was held on 1 August at the ExCeL Exhibition Centre.

South Korea's Kim Ji-yeon won the gold medal. Thirty-two fencers from 24 countries competed.

== Competition format ==
The competition was a single-elimination tournament with a bronze medal final for semifinal losers.

== Schedule ==
All times are British Summer Time (UTC+1)

Date	Time	Round
Wednesday, 1 August 2012	09:00	Qualifications and finals

== Results ==
=== Finals ===
Semi-finals
Mariel Zagunis (USA)	13
Kim Ji-yeon (KOR)	15
Olha Kharlan (UKR)	12
Sofiya Velikaya (RUS)	15

Final
Kim Ji-yeon (KOR)	15
Sofiya Velikaya (RUS)	9
Bronze medal match
Mariel Zagunis (USA)	10
Olha Kharlan (UKR)	15

==== Top half ====
Round of 32
Mariel Zagunis (USA)	15
Diah Permatasari (INA)	7
Seira Nakayama (JPN)	15
Léonore Perrus (FRA)	12
Yuliya Gavrilova (RUS)	15
Yuliya Zhivitsa (KAZ)	7
Bianca Pascu (ROU)	10
Zhu Min (CHN)	15
Kim Ji-yeon (KOR)	15
Ursula González (MEX)	3
María Belén Pérez Maurice (ARG)	10
Gioia Marzocca (ITA)	15
Aleksandra Socha (POL)	15
Sandra Sassine (CAN)	7
Louise Bond-Williams (GBR)	8
Vassiliki Vougiouka (GRE)	15

Round of 16
Mariel Zagunis (USA)	15
Seira Nakayama (JPN)	9
Yuliya Gavrilova (RUS)	11
Zhu Min (CHN)	15
Kim Ji-yeon (KOR)	15
Gioia Marzocca (ITA)	7
Aleksandra Socha (POL)	7
Vassiliki Vougiouka (GRE)	15

Quarter-finals
Mariel Zagunis (USA)	15
Zhu Min (CHN)	6
Kim Ji-yeon (KOR)	15
Vassiliki Vougiouka (GRE)	12

Semi-finals
Mariel Zagunis (USA)	13
Kim Ji-yeon (KOR)	15

==== Bottom half ====
Round of 32
Olha Kharlan (UKR)	15
Margarita Tschomakova (BUL)	8
Alexandra Bujdoso (GER)	13
Sabina Mikina (AZE)	15
Chen Xiaodong (CHN)	15
Amira Ben Chaabane (TUN)	12
Sophie Williams (GBR)	6
Irene Vecchi (ITA)	15
Azza Besbes (TUN)	15
Au Sin Ying (HKG)	13
Salma Mahran (EGY)	6
Dagmara Wozniak (USA)	15
Lee Ra-Jin (KOR)	9
Alejandra Benítez (VEN)	15
Lea Moutoussamy (ALG)	6
Sofiya Velikaya (RUS)	15

Round of 16
Olha Kharlan (UKR)	15
Sabina Mikina (AZE)	10
Chen Xiaodong (CHN)	10
Irene Vecchi (ITA)	15
Azza Besbes (TUN)	13
Dagmara Wozniak (USA)	15
Alejandra Benítez (VEN)	10
Sofya Velikaya (RUS)	15

Quarter-finals
Olha Kharlan (UKR)	15
Irene Vecchi (ITA)	9
Dagmara Wozniak (USA)	13
Sofiya Velikaya (RUS)	15

Semi-finals
Olha Kharlan (UKR)	12
Sofiya Velikaya (RUS)	15

== Results ==
Rank	Fencer	Country
1st place, gold medalist(s)	Kim Ji-yeon	South Korea
2nd place, silver medalist(s)	Sofiya Velikaya	Russia
3rd place, bronze medalist(s)	Olha Kharlan	Ukraine
4	Mariel Zagunis	United States
5	Vassiliki Vougiouka	Greece
6	Irene Vecchi	Italy
7	Zhu Min	China
8	Dagmara Wozniak	United States
9	Azza Besbes	Tunisia
10	Yuliya Gavrilova	Russia
11	Chen Xiaodong	China
12	Gioia Marzocca	Italy
13	Aleksandra Socha	Poland
14	Sabina Mikina	Azerbaijan
15	Alejandra Benítez	Venezuela
16	Seira Nakayama	Japan
17	Léonore Perrus	France
18	Lee Ra-Jin	South Korea
19	Sandra Sassine	Canada
20	Alexandra Bujdoso	Germany
21	María Belén Pérez Maurice	Argentina
22	Amira Ben Chaabane	Tunisia
23	Yuliya Zhivitsa	Kazakhstan
24	Salma Mahran	Egypt
25	Bianca Pascu	Romania
26	Au Sin Ying	Hong Kong
27	Sophie Williams	Great Britain
28	Ursula González	Mexico
29	Louise Bond-Williams	Great Britain
30	Margarita Tschomakova	Bulgaria
31	Diah Permatasari	Indonesia
32	Lea Moutoussamy	Algeria
