= Anna Márton =

Hungarian fencer

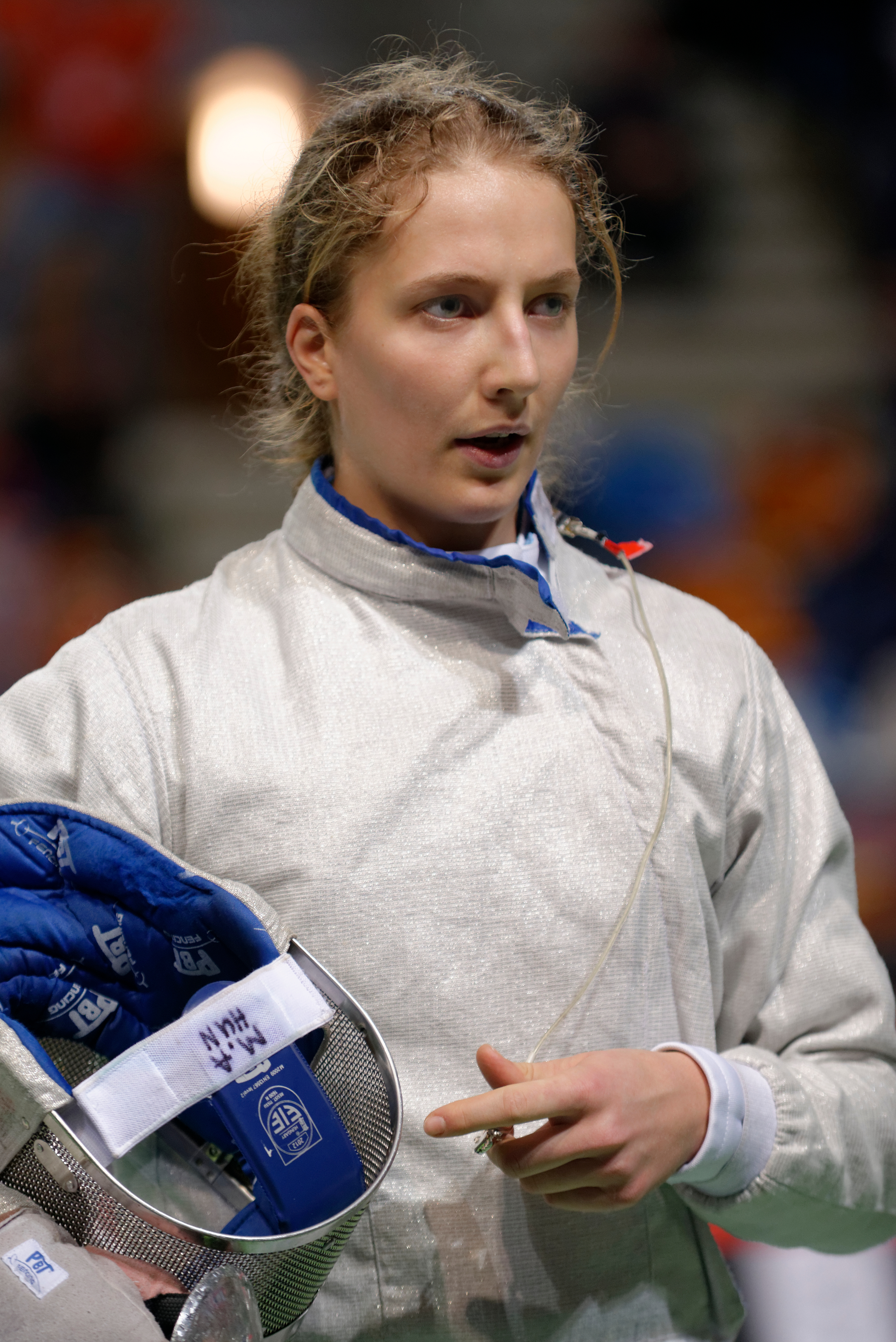
- Márton at the 2014 Orléans Grand Prix

Personal information
- Nationality: Hungarian
- Born: 31 March 1995 (age 31) Budapest, Hungary
- Height: 1.80 m (5 ft 11 in)
- Weight: 70 kg (154 lb)

Fencing career
- Sport: Fencing
- Country: Hungary
- Weapon: Sabre
- Hand: Right-handed
- Club: BSE ( –2013); MTK Budapest (2014– )
- Head coach: Gábor Gárdos, Pézsa Tibor
- FIE ranking: current ranking
Medal record
Women's sabre
Representing Hungary
World Championships
| Gold medal – first place | 2023 Milan | Team |
| Bronze medal – third place | 2015 Moscow | Individual |
European Championships
| Silver medal – second place | 2016 Toruń | Individual |
| Silver medal – second place | 2019 Düsseldorf | Team |
| Bronze medal – third place | 2019 Düsseldorf | Individual |
World Juniors Championships
| Gold medal – first place | 2014 Plovdiv | Individual |
| Bronze medal – third place | 2015 Tashkent | Team |

Anna Márton (born 31 March 1995) is a Hungarian sabre fencer. She is a World Championships gold and bronze medalist, three-time European Championships medalist and three-time Olympian. Márton represented Hungary at the 2016 Summer Olympics, the 2020 Summer Olympics and the 2024 Summer Olympics. At junior level, she became world and European champion in 2014.

== Career ==
Márton began fencing at the age of nine. She has been coached by Gábor Gárdos since she was ten. Márton won the 2010 Cadet European Championships in Athens and earned a bronze medal at the World Juniors Championships in Baku that same year.

In 2011, Márton joined the senior Hungarian national team at the age of sixteen and took part in the World Championships in Catania. She did not advance past the qualification phase in the individual event, while in the team event, Hungary defeated Canada and South Korea before losing to top-seed Russia, who eventually won the gold medal.

In the 2011–12 season, Márton won a double gold medal in the cadet category and an individual gold medal in the junior category at the European Championships in Poreč. She took part in the senior European Championships in Legnano, but lost in the first round to World No.1 Olha Kharlan. The following year, she reached the quarter-finals at the European Championships in Zagreb, ceding to Kharlan again. She was stopped by Zhu Min in the round of 32 at the 2013 World Championships in Budapest.

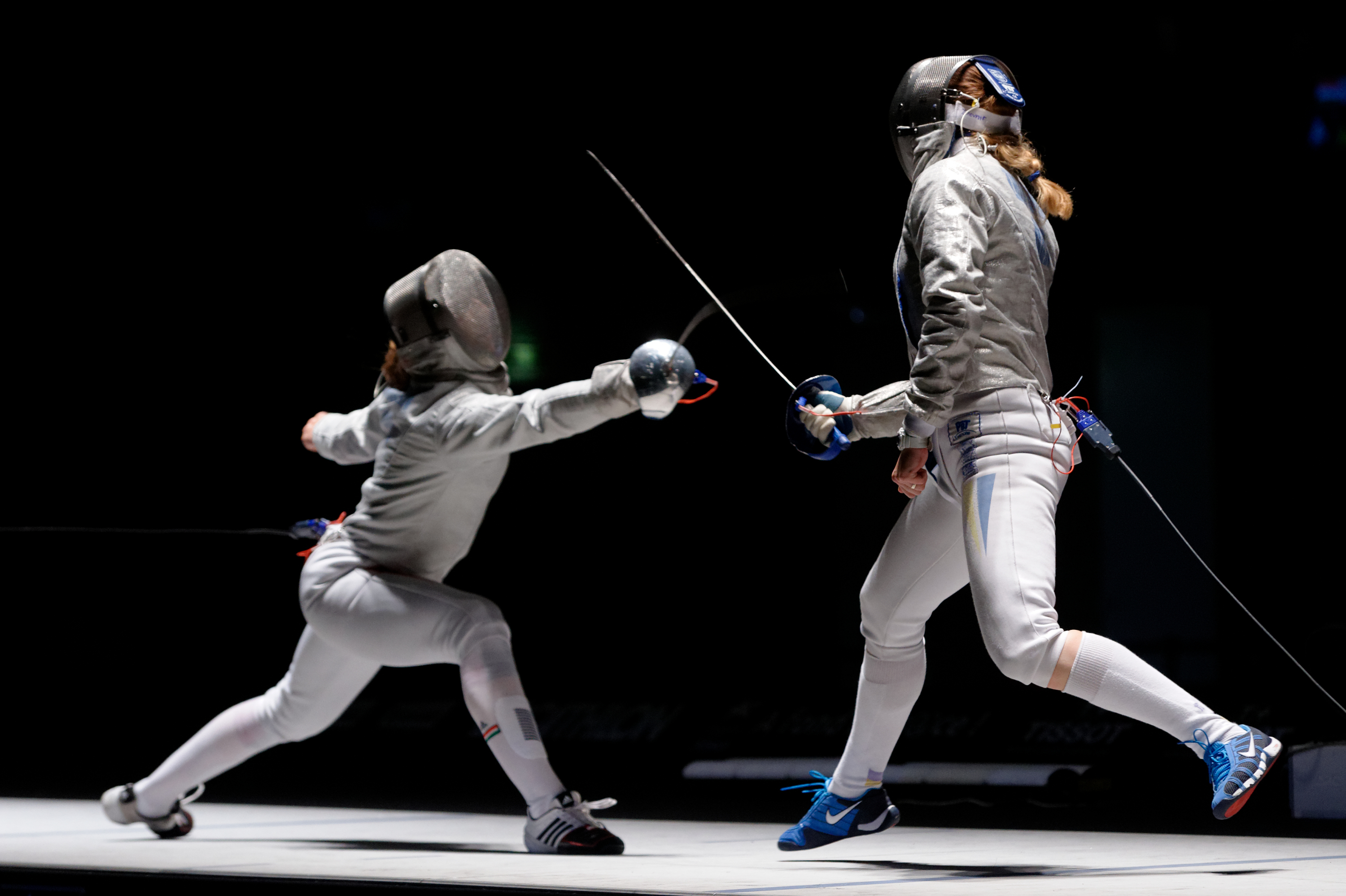
Márton (L) fences Ukraine's Olha Zhovnir at the 2014 European Championships

In the 2013–14 season, Márton became junior European and world champion in Jerusalem and Plovdiv respectively. She also reached the round of 16 in four stages of the Fencing World Cup. She was stopped in the second round by Yana Egorian at the 2014 European Championships in Strasbourg and reached the round of 16 at the 2014 World Championships in Kazan, where she was edged out by Yekaterina Dyachenko. Márton won the bronze medal in the women's sabre event at the 2015 World Championships in Moscow. She won the silver medal in the women's individual event at the 2016 European Championships in Toruń. Márton represented Hungary in the women's sabre event at the 2016 Summer Olympics in Rio de Janeiro, reaching the round of 16. At the 2019 European Championships in Düsseldorf, she won the silver medal in the women's team event and the bronze medal in the women's individual event.

Márton competed in the women's sabre event and women's team sabre event at the 2020 Summer Olympics in Tokyo, losing the bronze medal match to Manon Brunet and placing eight with the Hungarian national team respectively. She won the gold medal in the women's team event at the 2023 World Championships in Milan. Márton competed in the 2024 Summer Olympics in Paris, reaching the quarterfinals in the women's sabre event and placing sixth in the women's team sabre event.

== Education ==
Márton studied biology at Eötvös Loránd University.

== Awards ==
- Hungarian Fencer of the Year (4): 2015, 2017, 2019, 2021
