= 2011–12 Fencing World Cup =

International fencing competition

The 41st FIE Fencing World Cup began in October 2011 and concluded in August 2012 at the 2012 Summer Olympics held in London.

== Individual Épée ==
Men
1	Nikolai Novosjolov (EST)	195
2	Max Heinzer (SUI)	164
3	Rubén Limardo (VEN)	163
4	Fabian Kauter (SUI)	149
5	Jung Jin-sun (KOR)	148
6	Elmir Alimzhanov (KAZ)	142
7	Silvio Fernández (VEN)	142
8	Paolo Pizzo (ITA)	124
9	Géza Imre (HUN)	112
10	Jean-Michel Lucenay (FRA)	112

Women
1	Sun Yujie (CHN)	209
2	Yana Shemyakina (UKR)	183
3	Britta Heidemann (GER)	165
4	Rossella Fiamingo (ITA)	161
5	Simona Gherman (ROU)	155
6	Anca Măroiu (ROU)	149
7	Luo Xiaojuan (CHN)	125
8	Monika Sozanska (GER)	125
9	Shin A-lam (KOR)	124
10	Li Na (CHN)	120

== Individual Foil ==
Men
1	Andrea Cassarà (ITA)	219
2	Lei Sheng (CHN)	199
3	Ma Jianfei (CHN)	189
4	Alaaeldin Abouelkassem (EGY)	171
5	Choi Byung-chul (KOR)	169
6	Andrea Baldini (ITA)	151
7	Aleksey Cheremisinov (RUS)	150
8	Valerio Aspromonte (ITA)	143
9	Race Imboden (USA)	134
10	Alexander Massialas (USA)	121

Women
1	Arianna Errigo (ITA)	243
2	Elisa Di Francisca (ITA)	237
3	Nam Hyun-hee (KOR)	229
4	Valentina Vezzali (ITA)	228
5	Astrid Guyart (FRA)	156
6	Lee Kiefer (USA)	150
7	Corinne Maîtrejean (FRA)	133
8	Inès Boubakri (TUN)	132
9	Sylwia Gruchała (POL)	120
10	Kamilla Gafurzianova (RUS)	116

== Individual Sabre ==
Men
1	Nicolas Limbach (GER)	243
2	Aleksey Yakimenko (RUS)	232
3	Áron Szilágyi (HUN)	210
4	Gu Bon-gil (KOR)	167
5	Rareș Dumitrescu (ROU)	164
6	Nikolay Kovalev (RUS)	153
7	Diego Occhiuzzi (ITA)	149
8	Won Woo-young (KOR)	137
9	Veniamin Reshetnikov (RUS)	127
10	Boladé Apithy (FRA)	113

Women
1	Mariel Zagunis (USA)	274
2	Sofya Velikaya (RUS)	249
3	Olha Kharlan (UKR)	248
4	Kim Ji-yeon (KOR)	235
5	Vassiliki Vougiouka (GRE)	190
6	Dagmara Wozniak (USA)	141
7	Irene Vecchi (ITA)	140
8	Zhu Min (CHN)	139
9	Azza Besbes (TUN)	134
10	Chen Xiaodong (CHN)	133

== Team Épée ==
Men
1	United States	344
2	France	324
3	Switzerland	300
4	Hungary	281
5	Italy	261
6	South Korea	233
7	China	214
8	Russia	214
9	Venezuela	211
10	Canada	194

Women
1	Russia	368
2	China	342
3	Romania	286
4	United States	283
5	South Korea	265
6	Italy	246
7	Ukraine	224
8	Germany	224
9	Estonia	176
10	Poland	171

== Team Foil ==
Men
1	Italy	436
2	Germany	340
3	China	284
4	United States	262
5	Japan	261
6	France	254
7	Russia	234
8	Egypt	220
9	Great Britain	200
10	South Korea	160

Women
1	Italy	448
2	Russia	364
3	South Korea	308
4	France	276
5	United States	242
6	Poland	242
7	Japan	215
8	Great Britain	172
9	Hungary	145
10	Canada	144

== Team Sabre ==
Men
1	Russia	344
2	South Korea	330
3	Romania	328
4	Germany	284
5	China	280
6	Belarus	258
7	Italy	242
8	United States	232
9	France	160
10	Hungary	133

Women
1	Russia	408
2	United States	376
3	Ukraine	324
4	Italy	304
5	China	236
6	Poland	218
7	France	210
8	Azerbaijan	195
9	Germany	180
10	Hungary	167
