= Sophie Williams (disambiguation) =

Sophie Williams is a fencer.

Sophie Williams may also refer to:

- Sophie-May Williams, singer
- Sophie Williams, character in Post Captain (novel)
