= Moutoussamy =

Moutoussamy is a surname. Notable people with the surname include:

- Ernest Moutoussamy (born 1941), French politician
- John Moutoussamy (1922-1995), African-American architect
- Lea Moutoussamy, Algerian fencer
- Samuel Moutoussamy (born 1996), French footballer
- Thierry Moutoussamy (born 1972), French musician, known as Lord Kossity
