= Marta Baeza =

Brazilian fencer

Personal information
- Full name: Marta Baeza Centurion
- Born: 2 March 1992 (age 34) Rio de Janeiro, Brazil
- Height: 1.64 m (5 ft 5 in)
- Weight: 52 kg (115 lb)

Fencing career
- Sport: Fencing
- Country: Brazil
- Weapon: sabre
- Hand: right-handed

Marta Baeza Centurion (born March 2, 1992, in Rio de Janeiro, Brazil) is a Brazilian fencer who participated in the women's sabre fencing event at the 2016 Summer Olympics.

== 2016 Summer Olympics ==
In the 2016 Summer Olympics, Marta went down with an injury when she played against Bogna Jozwiak.

== 2022 Fencing Peace Caravan ==
In response to the 2022 Russian invasion of Ukraine, Marta co-organised the Fencing Peace Caravan, a project to take 21 underage Ukrainian fencers between the ages of 9 and 17 to Madrid, allowing them to study, train, and have a routine as close as possible to what they had before the war.
