= Salma Mahran =

Egyptian sabre fencer

Personal information
- Full name: Salma Zain Muhammad; Al-Abidin Mahran
- Nationality: Egypt
- Born: 14 April 1990 (age 36) Alexandria, Egypt
- Height: 1.70 m (5 ft 7 in)
- Weight: 60 kg (132 lb)

Sport
- Sport: Fencing
- Event: Sabre

Salma Zain Muhammad Al-Abidin Mahran (Arabic: سلمي زين العابدين محمد مهران; born 14 April 1990 in Alexandria) is an Egyptian sabre fencer. Mahran represented Egypt at the 2012 Summer Olympics in London, where she competed in the women's individual sabre event. She lost the first preliminary round match to Polish-born U.S. fencer Dagmara Wozniak, with a final score of 6–15.
