= Women's team sabre at the 2017 World Fencing Championships =

- Venue: Arena Leipzig
- Location: Leipzig, Germany
- Dates: 25 July

Medalists
gold medal	Martina Criscio; Rossella Gregorio; Loreta Gulotta; Irene Vecchi	Italy
silver medal	Hwang Seon-a; Kim Ji-yeon; Seo Ji-yeon; Yoon Ji-su	South Korea
bronze medal	Cécilia Berder; Manon Brunet; Charlotte Lembach; Caroline Queroli	France

The Women's team sabre event of the 2017 World Fencing Championships was held on 25 July 2017.

== Draw ==
=== Championship bracket ===
Round of 32
Azerbaijan	36
Belarus	45
Thailand	37
Spain	45
Germany	45
Turkey	42
Venezuela	42
Hong Kong	45
China	45
Georgia	34
Dominican Republic	25
Japan	45
Canada	45
Kazakhstan	38

Round of 16
Italy	45
Belarus	34
Mexico	45
Hungary	35
Ukraine	45
Spain	23
Germany	17
France	45
United States	45
Hong Kong	33
China	27
South Korea	45
Poland	34
Japan	45
Canada	25
Russia	45

Quarterfinals
Italy	45
Mexico	30
Ukraine	33
France	45
United States	41
South Korea	45
Japan	45
Russia	43

Semifinals
Italy	45
France	42
South Korea	45
Japan	32

Final
Italy	45
South Korea	27
Third place
France	45
Japan	39

=== 5–8th place bracket ===
5–8th place semifinals
Mexico	43
Ukraine	45
United States	42
Russia	45

Fifth place
Ukraine	43
Russia	45
Seventh place
Mexico	38
United States	45

=== 9–16th place bracket ===
9–16th place quarterfinals
Belarus	34
Hungary	45
Spain	45
Germany	22
Hong Kong	45
China	42
Poland	45
Canada	20

9–12th place semifinals
Hungary	45
Spain	41
Hong Kong	43
Poland	45

Ninth place
Hungary	45
Poland	39
Eleventh place
Spain	45
Hong Kong	41

=== 13–16th place bracket ===
13–16th place semifinals
Belarus
Germany
China	45
Canada	27

13th place
Belarus	45
China	37
15th place
Germany
Canada

== Final ranking ==
Rank	Team
Gold medal	Italy
Silver medal	South Korea
Bronze medal	France
4	Japan
5	Russia
6	Ukraine
7	Mexico
8	United States
9	Hungary
10	Poland
11	Spain
12	Hong Kong
13	Belarus
14	China
15	Canada
16	Germany
17	Azerbaijan
18	Kazakhstan
19	Venezuela
20	Turkey
21	Thailand
22	Georgia
23	Dominican Republic
