= Sophie Williams =

British fencer (born 1991)

Personal information
- Born: 21 March 1991 (age 35)

Sport
- Sport: Fencing
- College team: UCLU women's 1st

Sophie Williams (born 21 March 1991) is a British fencer. At the 2012 Summer Olympics she competed in the Women's individual sabre event, where she lost in the first round to the Italian Irene Vecchi. She is currently studying for a degree in Neuroscience at University College London.
