= Chen Xiaodong (fencer) =

Chinese fencer (born 1988)

Personal information
- Nationality: China
- Born: 11 January 1988 (age 38) Shanghai, China
- Height: 1.79 m (5 ft 10 1/2 in)
- Weight: 69 kg (152 lb)

Sport
- Sport: Fencing
- Event: Sabre
Medal record
Women's fencing
Representing China
Asian Games
Gold medal – first place	2010 Guangzhou	Team sabre

Chen Xiaodong (simplified Chinese: 陈晓东; traditional Chinese: 陳曉東; pinyin: Chén Xiǎodōng; born January 11, 1988, in Shanghai) is a Chinese sabre fencer. She won a gold medal, as a member of the host nation's fencing team, in the same weapon at the 2010 Asian Games in Guangzhou.

Chen represented China at the 2012 Summer Olympics in London, where she competed in the women's individual sabre event, along with her teammate Zhu Min. She defeated Tunisia's Amira Ben Chaabane in the first preliminary round, before losing her next match to Italy's Irene Vecchi, with a final score of 10–15.
