= Seo Ji-yeon =

South Korean fencer

Personal information
- Born: 3 March 1993 (age 33) Seoul, South Korea
- Height: 1.68 m (5 ft 6 in)
- Weight: 56 kg (123 lb)

Fencing career
- Sport: Fencing
- Country: South Korea
- Weapon: Sabre
- Hand: right-handed
Medal record
Women's sabre
Representing South Korea
Olympic Games
| Bronze medal – third place | 2020 Tokyo | Team |
World Championships
| Silver medal – second place | 2017 Leipzig | Team |
| Silver medal – second place | 2025 Tbilisi | Team |
Asian Games
| Gold medal – first place | 2026 Aichi–Nagoya | Team |

Seo Ji-yeon (Korean pronunciation: [sʌ.dʑi.jʌn] or [sʌ] [tɕi.jʌn]; born 3 March 1993) is a South Korean right-handed sabre fencer, two-time Olympian, and a 2021 team Olympic bronze medalist.

== Medal Record ==
=== Olympic Games ===
| Year | Location | Event | Position |
|---|---|---|---|
| 2021 | Tokyo, Japan | Team Women's Sabre | 3rd |

=== World Championship ===
| Year | Location | Event | Position |
|---|---|---|---|
| 2017 | Leipzig, Germany | Team Women's Sabre | 2nd |
| 2025 | (Georgia (country)) Tbilisi, Georgia | Team Women's Sabre | 2nd |

=== Asian Championship ===
| Year | Location | Event | Position |
|---|---|---|---|
| 2017 | Hong Kong, China | Individual Women's Sabre | 2nd |
| 2017 | Hong Kong, China | Team Women's Sabre | 2nd |

=== Grand Prix ===
| Date | Location | Event | Position |
|---|---|---|---|
| 03/25/2016 | Seoul, South Korea | Individual Women's Sabre | 2nd |
| 04/26/2019 | Seoul, South Korea | Individual Women's Sabre | 3rd |

=== World Cup ===
| Date | Location | Event | Position |
|---|---|---|---|
| 10/09/2015 | Caracas, Venezuela | Individual Women's Sabre | 2nd |
| 12/13/2019 | (United States) Salt Lake City, Utah | Individual Women's Sabre | 3rd |
