= Lea Moutoussamy =

Algerian fencer

Personal information
- Born: 18 October 1997 (age 27); Paris, France

Sport
- Country: Algeria
- Sport: Fencing

Lea Melissa Moutoussamy (ليا ميليسا موتوسامي) is a right-handed Algerian sabre fencer. At the 2012 Summer Olympics she competed in the Women's sabre, losing in the first round to Russian Sofiya Velikaya by a score of 15–6. When she competed in 2012, she was the youngest fencer to ever have participated in the Olympics; she was 14 years and 288 days old.

Moutoussamy was born on 18 October 1997, in Paris, France. She fences with the club US Metro, in Paris.
