= Women's team sabre at the 2011 World Fencing Championships =

The Women's team sabre event of the 2011 World Fencing Championships took place on October 15, 2011.

== Medalists ==
1st place, gold medalist(s)	Russia; Ekaterina Diatchenko; Sofiya Velikaya; Julia Gavrilova; Dina Galiakbarova
2nd place, silver medalist(s)	Ukraine; Olena Khomrova; Halyna Pundyk; Olha Kharlan; Olha Zhovnir
3rd place, bronze medalist(s)	United States; Ibtihaj Muhammad; Mariel Zagunis; Dagmara Wozniak; Daria Schneider

== Draw ==
=== Finals ===
Semifinals
Russia	45
United States	33
Azerbaijan	25
Ukraine	45

Final
Russia	45
Ukraine	43
Third place
United States	45
Azerbaijan	40

=== Top half ===
Round of 32
Russia
Bye
Hong Kong	45
Mexico	44
Hungary	45
Canada	31
Bye
South Korea
Italy
Bye
Australia	33
United Kingdom	45
Tunisia	45
Iceland	43
Bye
United States

Round of 16
Russia	45
Hong Kong	17
Hungary	45
South Korea	39
Italy	45
United Kingdom	25
Tunisia	35
United States	45

Quarterfinals
Russia	45
Hungary	29
Italy	43
United States	45

Semifinals
Russia	45
United States	33

=== Bottom half ===
Round of 32
China
Bye
Venezuela	45
Kazakhstan	39
Japan	40
Azerbaijan	45
Bye
France
Poland
Bye
Brazil	16
Germany	45
Spain	45
Argentina	33
Bye
Ukraine

Round of 16
China	45
Venezuela	43
Azerbaijan	45
France	44
Poland	45
Germany	27
Spain	26
Ukraine	45

Quarterfinals
China	43
Azerbaijan	45
Poland	36
Ukraine	45

Semifinals
Azerbaijan	25
Ukraine	45

=== Placement matches ===
==== 5–8th place ====
5–8th place semifinals
Hungary	45
Italy	40
China	33
Poland	45

Fifth place
Hungary	26
Poland	45
Seventh place
Italy	45
China	40

==== 9–12th place ====
9–16th place quarterfinals
Hong Kong	22
South Korea	45
United Kingdom	45
Tunisia	26
Venezuela	34
France	45
Germany	42
Spain	45

9–12th place semifinals
South Korea	45
United Kingdom	41
France	45
Spain	43

Ninth place
South Korea	43
France	45
11th place
United Kingdom	45
Spain	35

==== 13–16th place ====
13–16th place semifinals
Hong Kong	45
Tunisia	30
Venezuela	37
Germany	45

13th place
Hong Kong	26
Germany	45
15th place
Tunisia	34
Venezuela	45
