= Margarita Tschomakova =

Bulgarian fencer

Personal information
- Nationality: Bulgaria
- Born: 27 November 1988 (age 37) Sofia, Bulgaria
- Height: 1.70 m (5 ft 7 in)
- Weight: 55 kg (121 lb)

Sport
- Sport: Fencing
- Event: Sabre
- College team: Ohio State Buckeyes
- Coached by: Vladimir Nazlymov

Margarita Tschomakova (also Margarita Chomakova, Bulgarian: Маргарита Чомакова; born 27 November 1988 in Sofia) is a Bulgarian sabre fencer. Tschomakova is the daughter of Georgi Chomakov, who competed in the same weapon at the 1980 Summer Olympics in Moscow, and at the 1988 Summer Olympics in Seoul.

Tschomakova represented Bulgaria at the 2012 Summer Olympics in London, where she competed as the nation's lone fencer in the women's individual sabre event. Unfortunately, she lost the first preliminary round match to Ukrainian fencer and top medal contender Olga Kharlan, with a final score of 8–15.

Tschomakova is also a member of the fencing team for Ohio State Buckeyes, and a graduate of international business at the Ohio State University in Columbus, Ohio.
