= Yuliya Gavrilova =

Russian sabre fencer

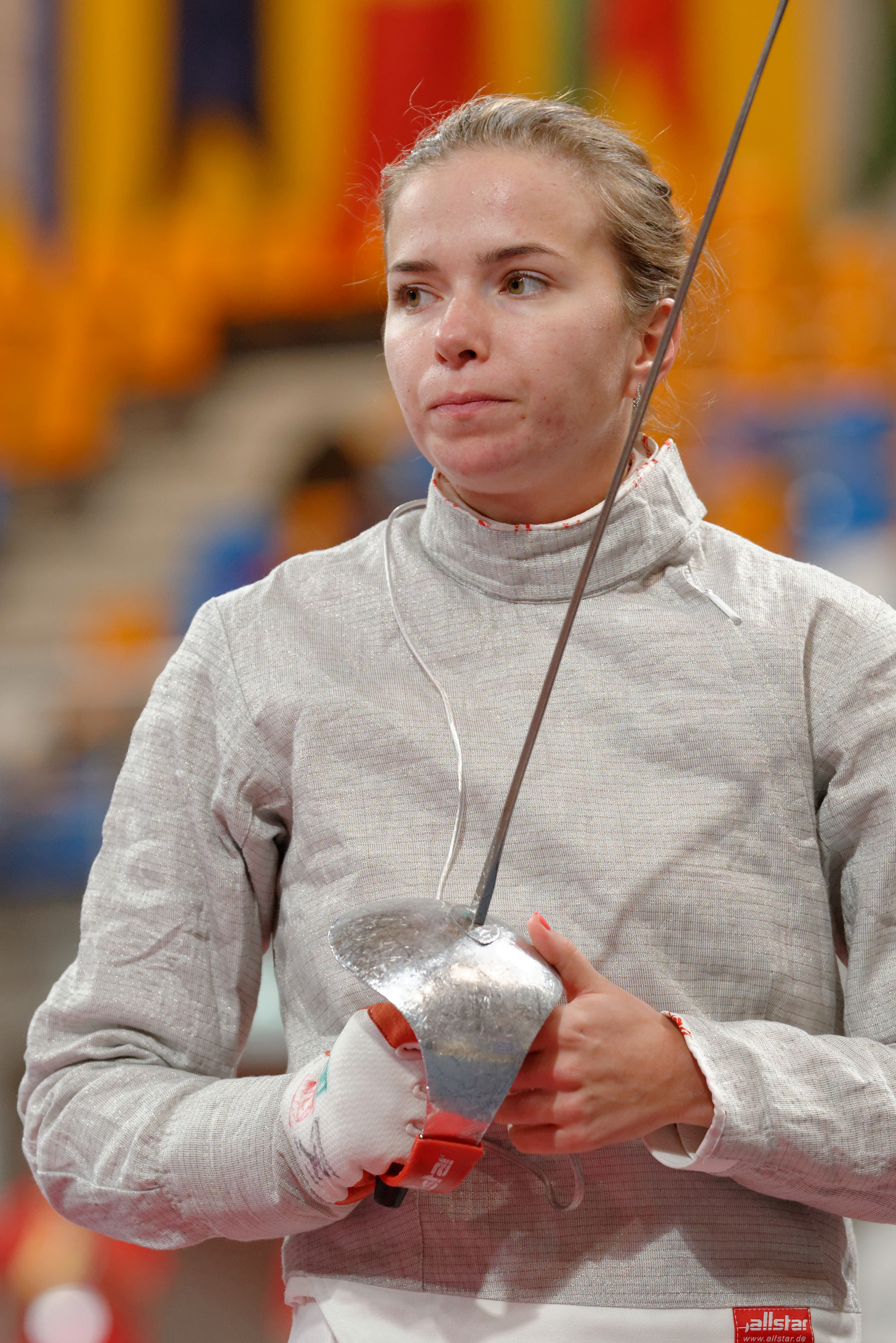
- Gavrilova in 2014

Personal information
- Full name: Yuliya Petrovna Gavrilova
- Nationality: Russian
- Born: 20 July 1989 (age 36) Novosibirsk, Russian SFSR, Soviet Union
- Height: 1.68 m (5 ft 6 in)
- Weight: 60 kg (132 lb)

Fencing career
- Sport: Fencing
- Country: Russia
- Weapon: Sabre
- Hand: Right-handed
- National coach: Christian Bauer
- Club: SDYuShOR
- Head coach: Yegor Yuzhakov
- FIE ranking: ranking
Medal record
Olympic Games
Gold medal – first place	2016 Rio de Janeiro	Team sabre
World Championships
Gold medal – first place	2010 Paris	Team sabre
Gold medal – first place	2011 Catania	Team sabre
Gold medal – first place	2012 Kyiv	Team sabre
Gold medal – first place	2015 Moscow	Team sabre
Silver medal – second place	2013 Budapest	Team sabre
Bronze medal – third place	2011 Catania	Individual sabre
European Championships
Gold medal – first place	2012 Legnano	Team sabre
Gold medal – first place	2013 Zagreb	Team sabre
Gold medal – first place	2015 Monteaux	Team sabre
Gold medal – first place	2016 Toruń	Team sabre
Silver medal – second place	2009 Plovdiv	Team sabre
Silver medal – second place	2010 Leipzig	Team sabre
Bronze medal – third place	2011 Sheffield	Individual sabre
Bronze medal – third place	2011 Sheffield	Team sabre

Yuliya Petrovna Gavrilova (Russian: Юлия Петровна Гаврилова; born 20 July 1989) is a Russian sabre fencer. She won two medals (gold in the team event and bronze in the individual), as a member of the Russian team, in sabre at the 2011 World Fencing Championships in Catania, Italy.

== Career ==
She began fencing in 1999, when a fencing coach came to her school, looking for children who wanted to try fencing.

Gavrilova represented Russia at the 2012 Summer Olympics in London, where she competed in the women's individual sabre event, along with her teammate Sofiya Velikaya, who eventually won a silver medal in the final. She defeated Kazakhstan's Yuliya Zhivitsa in the first preliminary round, before losing out her next match to China's Zhu Min, with a final score of 11–15.

At the 2016 Summer Olympics, she was part of the Russian team that won gold in the women's team sabre event.
