= Rossella Gregorio =

Italian fencer (born 1990)

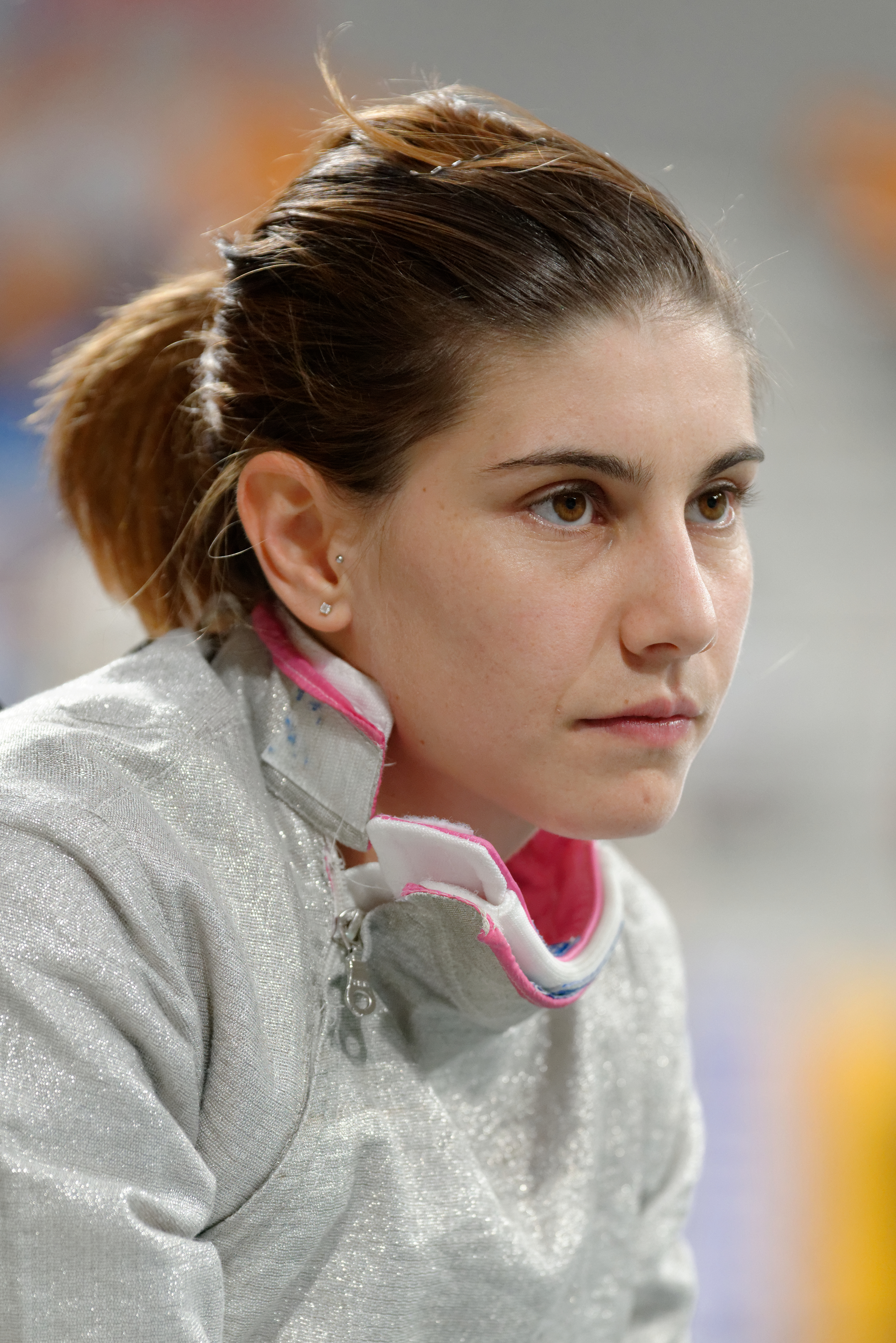

Personal information
- Nationality: Italian
- Born: 30 August 1990 (age 35) Salerno, Campania

Fencing career
- Sport: Fencing
- Weapon: Sabre
- Hand: left-handed
- National coach: Giovanni Sirovich
- Club: CS Carabinieri
- Head coach: Lucio Landi
- FIE ranking: current ranking
Medal record
Women's sabre
Representing Italy
World Championships
Gold medal – first place	2017 Leipzig	Team
European Games
Silver medal – second place	2023 Kraków–Małopolska	Team
European Championships
Gold medal – first place	2017 Tbilisi	Team
Silver medal – second place	2017 Tbilisi	Individual
Silver medal – second place	2022 Antalya	Individual
Silver medal – second place	2022 Antalya	Team
Silver medal – second place	2023 Kraków	Team
Bronze medal – third place	2013 Zagreb	Team
Bronze medal – third place	2014 Strasbourg	Individual
Bronze medal – third place	2015 Montreux	Individual

Rossella Gregorio (born 30 August 1990) is an Italian sabre fencer, bronze medallist in the 2014 European Fencing Championships. She competed at the 2020 Summer Olympics, in sabre.

== Career ==
Gregorio discovered fencing thanks to family friends who encouraged her parents to let her try the sport. She first trained at CS Salerno, where she was coached by Antonio Serra, before joining Frascati Scherma.

Gregorio won the 2009 Junior European Championship in Odense. A year later she became Junior Italian champion. She joined the national team for the 2013 European Championships in Zagreb. She was eliminated in the first round by Germany's Alexandra Bujdoso. In the team event, Italy defeated France but lost to Russia in the semi-finals. They edged out Poland in the small final to take the bronze medal, Gregorio's first medal in a senior international event.

In the 2013–14 season Gregorio climbed her first World Cup podium with a bronze medal in Bolzano, followed by another bronze in Antalya. At the European Championships in Strasburg, she reached the semi-finals, where she was stopped by World No.1 Olga Kharlan, and came away with a bronze medal.

In the 2014–15 season Gregorio reached the quarter-finals in the first World Cup event held in Cancún and proceeded to earn a silver medal in Orléans after being defeated by Sofiya Velikaya in the final.

She won the silver medal in the women's sabre event at the 2022 European Fencing Championships held in Antalya, Turkey.
