= Vassiliki Vougiouka =

Greek fencer (born 1986)

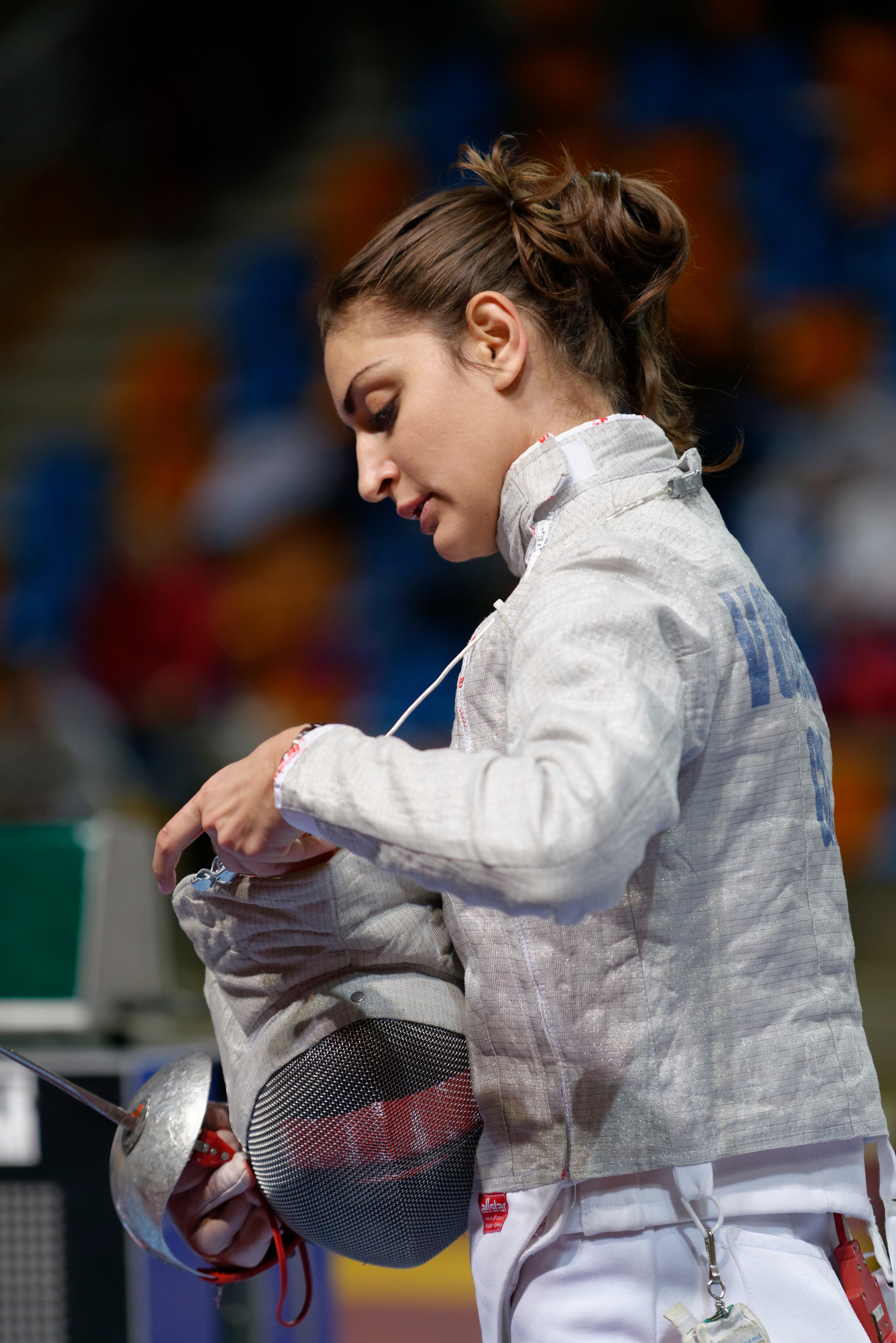
- At the 2014 Orléans Grand Prix

Personal information
- Nickname: Vas(s)o
- Born: June 20, 1986 (age 40)
- Height: 1.80 m (5 ft 11 in)
- Weight: 68 kg (150 lb)

Fencing career
- Sport: Fencing
- Country: Greece
- Weapon: high soccer
- Hand: right-handed
- National coach: Gabriel Duția
- Club: Olympiacos CFP
- FIE ranking: current ranking
Medal record
Women's Sabre
Representing Greece
European Championships
| Silver medal – second place | 2012 Legnano | Sabre |
| Silver medal – second place | 2013 Zagreb | Sabre |
| Bronze medal – third place | 2014 Strasbourg | Sabre |

Vassiliki Vougiouka (Greek: Βασιλική Βουγιούκα; born 20 June 1986, in Cholargos, Athens, Greece), often known as Vaso Vougiouka (Βάσω Βουγιούκα), is a Greek female sabre fencer, silver medallist in the 2012 and 2013 European Championships.

She participated at the 2012 Summer Olympics in London, in which she was eliminated in the quarter finals, as well as at the 2016 Summer Olympics in Rio de Janeiro.

== Career ==
Vougiouka took up fencing at the relative late age of 14. She first competed in foil and switched to sabre in 2005. She climbed her first podium in the Fencing World Cup with a gold medal in Budapest in 2010, the first victory at a World Cup event in the history of the Greek fencing.

She made her breakthrough in the 2011–12 season, earning a gold medal in the London World Cup and a bronze medal in the Tianjin Grand Prix. At the European Championships in Legnano, she lost to Ukraine's Olha Kharlan in the final and took a silver medal. She competed in the individual event at the 2012 Summer Olympics. She broke two of her front teeth during her T16 bout when her mask collided with that of Poland's Aleksandra Socha. Twenty minutes later she fenced Korea's Kim Ji-yeon in the quarter-final. The pain from her injury forced her to keep her mouth shut, which impeded her breathing. After taking an 8–3 lead she was eventually defeated 12–15 and finished 5th. She finished the season No.5 in world rankings. For her Olympic performance, she was named best athlete of the year by the Greek press.

In the 2012–13 season she took a bronze medal in the Antalya World Cup and the Moscow Grand Prix. She claimed her second continental silver medal in a row at the European Championships in Zagreb, losing again to Olha Kharlan in the final. At the World Championships in Budapest Vougiouka was stopped in the quarter-finals to Italy's Irene Vecchi.

In the 2013–14 season she won a bronze medal in the Bolzano World Cup and a silver medal in the Moscow Grand Prix. At the European Championships in Strasbourg, she was defeated in the semi-finals by Russia's Yekaterina Dyachenko and came away with a bronze medal. At the World Championships in Kazan, she was edged out 13–15 by Russia's Yana Egorian in the quarter-finals. Vougiouka finished world No.4, her best ranking to date.

She was named the Greek Female Athlete of the Year for 2012.

== Personal life ==
Vougiouka studied dentistry at the National and Kapodistrian University of Athens. Her cousin is the basketball player Ian Vougioukas.
