= Loreta Gulotta =

Italian fencer (born 1987)

Personal information
- Nationality: Italian
- Born: 8 May 1987 (age 39)
- Height: 1.74 m (5 ft 9 in)
- Weight: 63 kg (139 lb)

Sport
- Country: Italy
- Sport: Fencing
Medal record
World Championships
Gold medal – first place	2017 Leipzig	Team
European Championships
Gold medal – first place	2017 Tbilisi	Team

Loreta Gulotta (born 8 May 1987) is an Italian fencer. She represented her country at the 2016 Summer Olympics.
