= Nguyễn Thị Lệ Dung =

Vietnamese fencer

Medal record

Representing Vietnam

Women's Fencing

Southeast Asian Games
Gold medal – first place	2003 Southeast Asia Games	Individual sabre
Gold medal – first place	2005 Southeast Asia Games	Individual sabre
Gold medal – first place	2005 Southeast Asia Games	Team sabre
Gold medal – first place	2007 Southeast Asia Games	Individual sabre
Gold medal – first place	2007 Southeast Asia Games	Team sabre
Gold medal – first place	2011 Southeast Asia Games	Individual sabre
Gold medal – first place	2015 Southeast Asia Games	Team sabre
Gold medal – first place	2015 Southeast Asia Games	Individual sabre

Nguyễn Thị Lệ Dung (born September 9, 1985, in Hanoi, Vietnam) is a Vietnamese fencer. She competed at the 2016 Summer Olympics in the women's sabre event, in which she was eliminated in the round of 32 by Kim Ji-yeon.
