= Ilaria Bianco =

Italian sabre fencer (born 1980)

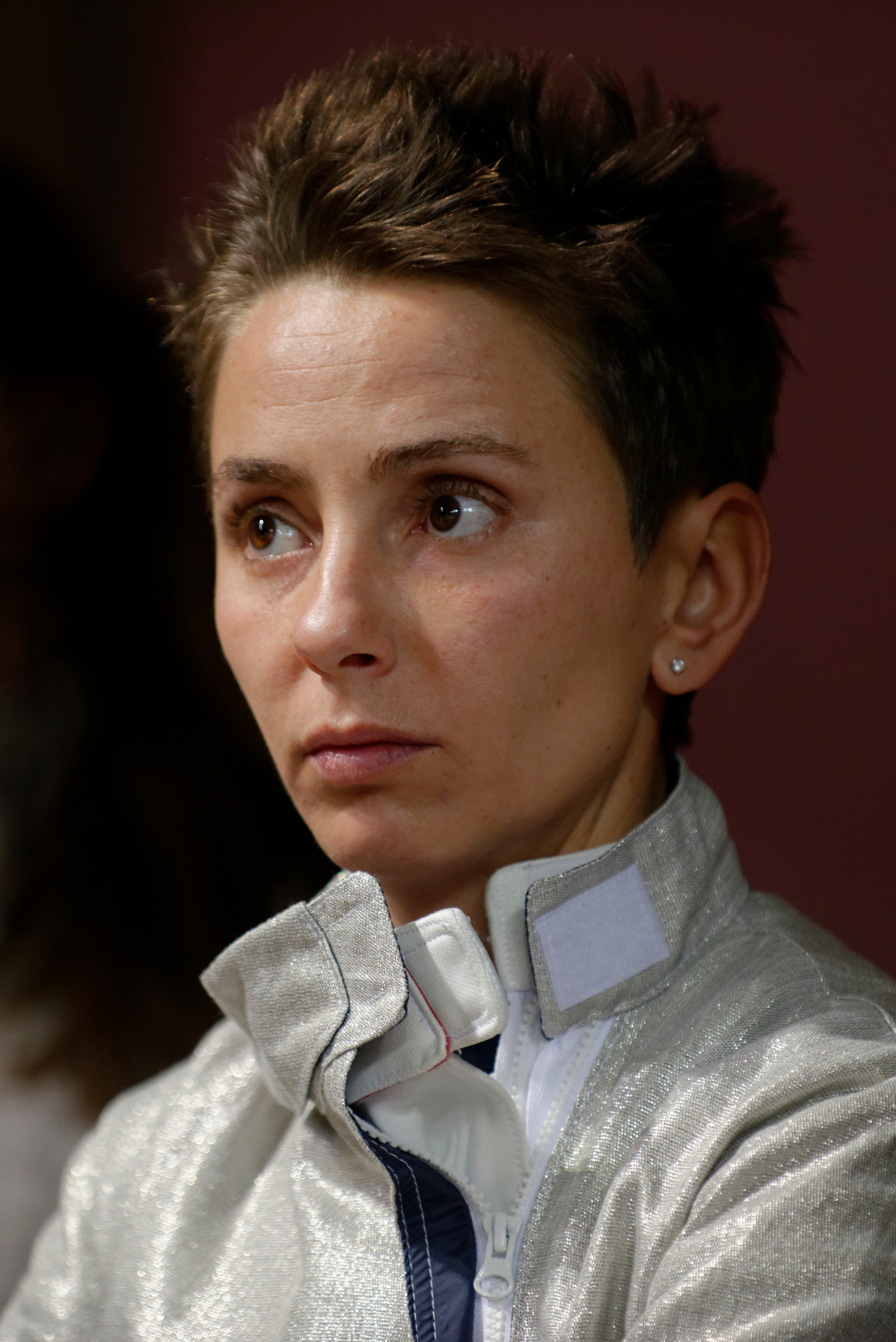
- Bianco at the 2014 Orléans Grand Prix

Personal information
- Nationality: Italy
- Born: 29 May 1980 (age 46) Pisa, Italy
- Height: 1.65 m (5 ft 5 in)
- Weight: 62 kg (137 lb)

Sport
- Sport: Fencing
- Event: Sabre
- Club: Sala d'Armi Aeronautica Militare
- Coached by: Nicola Zanotti
Medal record
Women's fencing
Representing Italy
World Championships
Gold medal – first place	1999 Seoul	Team sabre
Silver medal – second place	1999 Seoul	Sabre
Silver medal – second place	2000 Budapest	Sabre
Silver medal – second place	2001 Nimes	Sabre
Bronze medal – third place	2005 Leipzig	Sabre

Ilaria Bianco (born 29 May 1980 in Pisa) is an Italian sabre fencer. Between 1999 and 2005, Bianco had won a total of five medals (one gold, three silver, and one bronze), as a member of the Italian team, at the World Fencing Championships. She is a member of the fencing team for the Italian Military Air Force (Italian: Sala d'Armi Aeronautica Militare), and is coached and trained by Nicola Zanotti.

Bianco represented Italy at the 2008 Summer Olympics in Beijing, where she competed in the women's individual sabre event, along with her teammate Gioia Marzocca. She defeated China's Huang Haiyang in the preliminary round of thirty-two, before losing out her next match to Russia's Sofiya Velikaya, with a score of 6–15.
