= Cécilia Berder =

French fencer (born 1989)

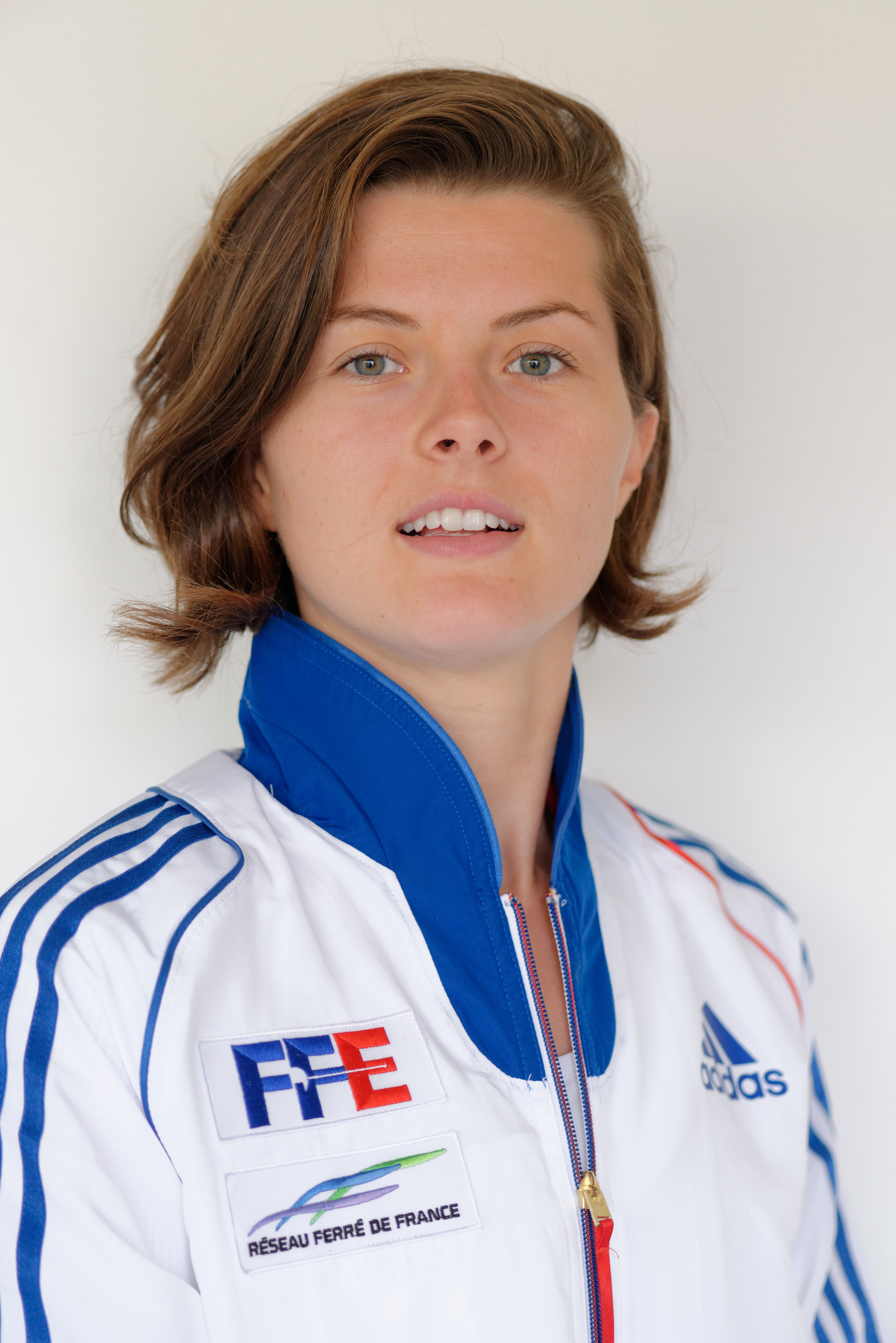
- Berder in 2013

Personal information
- Nickname: Cec
- Born: 13 December 1989 (age 36) Morlaix, France
- Height: 1.73 m (5 ft 8 in)
- Weight: 69 kg (152 lb)

Fencing career
- Sport: Fencing
- Country: France
- Weapon: Sabre
- Hand: right-handed
- National coach: Jean-Philippe Daurelle
- Club: Cercle d'Escrime Orléanais / INSEP
- FIE ranking: current ranking
Medal record
Olympic Games
Silver medal – second place	2020 Tokyo	Team
World Championships
Gold medal – first place	2018 Wuxi	Team
Silver medal – second place	2009 Antalya	Team
Silver medal – second place	2014 Kazan	Team
Silver medal – second place	2015 Moscow	Individual
Silver medal – second place	2019 Budapest	Team
Bronze medal – third place	2010 Paris	Team
Bronze medal – third place	2017 Leipzig	Individual
Bronze medal – third place	2017 Leipzig	Team
European Games
Gold medal – first place	2023 Kraków–Małopolska	Team
European Championships
Gold medal – first place	2023 Kraków	Team
Gold medal – first place	2024 Basel	Team
Silver medal – second place	2014 Strasbourg	Team
Silver medal – second place	2015 Montreux	Team
Silver medal – second place	2016 Toruń	Team
Silver medal – second place	2018 Novi Sad	Individual
Bronze medal – third place	2008 Kyiv	Team
Bronze medal – third place	2017 Tbilisi	Team
Bronze medal – third place	2018 Novi Sad	Team
Bronze medal – third place	2019 Düsseldorf	Team
Mediterranean Games
Gold medal – first place	2013 Mersin	Individual

Cécilia Berder (born 13 December 1989) is a French right-handed sabre fencer, 2018 team world champion, two-time Olympian, and 2021 team Olympic silver medalist.

== Career ==
Berder was born in 1989 in Morlaix, and grew up in the nearby city of Quimper. A very energetic child, she was pushed by her parents toward sport. Her first choice was rock climbing, but the class was full, so she opted for fencing at Escrime Quimper Cornouaille.

She first tried foil, the traditional teaching weapon, but found it boring. Coach Serge Larher suggested she try sabre, even though the class had only boys. After her baccalauréat, she joined the centre for promising young athletes in Orléans, where she trained with the likes of Anne-Lise Touya and Léonore Perrus. She won the bronze medal in the 2007 Junior European Fencing Championships at Prague.

In 2008, Berder was selected as reserve for the Beijing Olympics. The same year, she took her first national senior title. In the 2009 World Championships at Antalya, she climbed her first international podium with a team silver medal after France was defeated in the final by Ukraine. The next season, Berder climbed her first podium in the World Cup with a bronze medal in the Orleans Grand Prix, hosted by her own club. France was defeated again by Ukraine in the 2010 World Championships at home in Paris, this time in the semi-finals. In the small final, they overcame the United States, weakened by the injury withdrawal of Olympic champion Mariel Zagunis, to earn the bronze medal. In 2011, Berder made her way to the final of the Orléans Grand Prix, where she was defeated by Zagunis.

In the 2013–14 season Berder won her first World Cup title in Antalya, defeating reigning Olympic champion Kim Ji-yeon along the way. She also earned her first medal in the European Championships with a team silver in Strasbourg. In the World Championships, she got to the table of 16, a personal best to date, but was stopped by Zagunis. In the team event, France defeated Hungary, then host Russia and Italy to meet the United States in the final. France stood their ground for most of the match, leading 20–15 at some point, before giving way in the seventh leg. They were eventually beaten 39–45. Berder finished the season 16th in world rankings, a personal best.

Berder is pursuing a master of journalism at the École supérieure de journalisme de Paris.

Berder is competing at the 2016 Summer Olympics. She defeated Ibtihaj Muhammad in the second round.

== Medal record ==
=== Olympic Games ===
Year	Location	Event	Position
2021	Tokyo, Japan	Team Women's Sabre	2nd

=== World Championship ===
Year	Location	Event	Position
2009	Antalya, Turkey	Team Women's Sabre	2nd
2010	Paris, France	Team Women's Sabre	2nd
2014	Kazan, Russia	Team Women's Sabre	2nd
2015	Moscow, Russia	Individual Women's Sabre	2nd
2017	Leipzig, Germany	Individual Women's Sabre	3rd
2017	Leipzig, Germany	Team Women's Sabre	3rd
2018	Wuxi, China	Team Women's Sabre	1st
2019	Budapest, Hungary	Team Women's Sabre	2nd

=== European Championship ===
Year	Location	Event	Position
2008	Kyiv, Ukraine	Team Women's Sabre	3rd
2014	Strasbourg, France	Team Women's Sabre	2nd
2015	Montreux, Switzerland	Team Women's Sabre	2nd
2016	Toruń, Poland	Team Women's Sabre	2nd
2017	(Georgia (country)) Tbilisi, Georgia	Team Women's Sabre	3rd
2018	Novi Sad, Serbia	Individual Women's Sabre	2nd
2018	Novi Sad, Serbia	Team Women's Sabre	3rd
2019	Düsseldorf, Germany	Team Women's Sabre	3rd

=== Grand Prix ===
Date	Location	Event	Position
02/05/2010	Orléans, France	Individual Women's Sabre	3rd
02/11/2011	Orléans, France	Individual Women's Sabre	2nd
12/16/2016	Cancún, Mexico	Individual Women's Sabre	3rd
03/31/2017	Seoul, South Korea	Individual Women's Sabre	3rd
12/15/2017	Cancún, Mexico	Individual Women's Sabre	3rd
02/22/2019	Cairo, Egypt	Individual Women's Sabre	3rd

=== World Cup ===
Date	Location	Event	Position
03/14/2014	Antalya, Turkey	Individual Women's Sabre	1st
01/27/2017	(United States) New York, New York	Individual Women's Sabre	1st
01/25/2019	(United States) Salt Lake City, Utah	Individual Women's Sabre	1st
03/12/2021	Budapest, Hungary	Individual Women's Sabre	2nd
