= Sabina Mikina =

Azerbaijani fencer (born 1987)

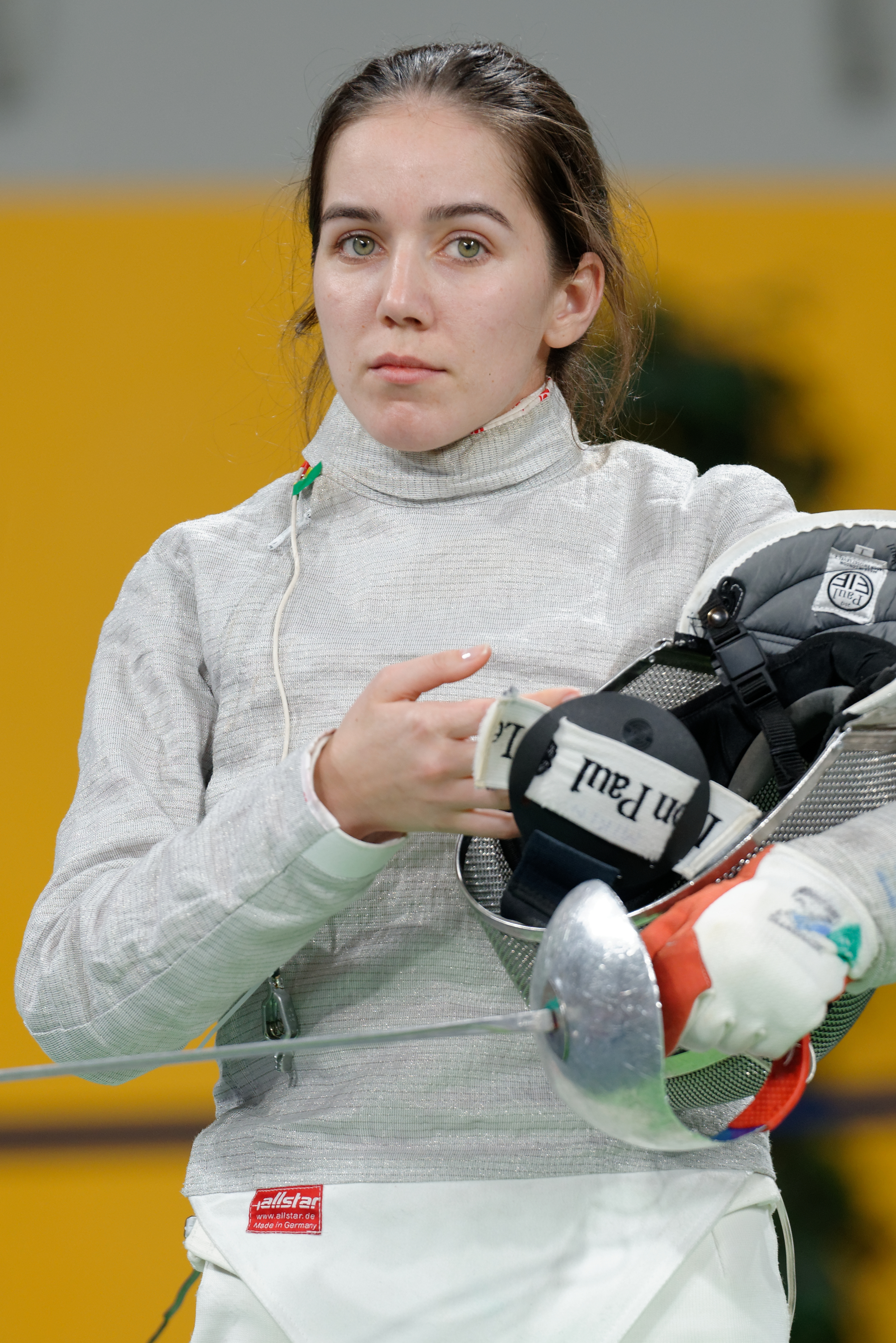

Personal information
- Nationality: Azerbaijan
- Born: 24 October 1987 (age 38) Baku, Azerbaijan SSR
- Height: 1.67 m (5 ft 5 1/2 in)
- Weight: 53 kg (117 lb)

Fencing career
- Sport: Fencing
- Weapon: Sabre
- Hand: left-handed
- National coach: Yashar Mammadov
- FIE ranking: current ranking

Sabina Mikina (Azerbaijani: Səbinə Mikina; born 24 October 1987 in Baku) is an Azerbaijani sabre fencer. Mikina represented Azerbaijan at the 2012 Summer Olympics in London, where she competed in the women's individual sabre event. She defeated Hungarian-born German fencer Alexandra Bujdoso in the first preliminary round, before losing her next match to Ukraine's Olga Kharlan, with a final score of 10–15.
