= Zhu Min (fencer) =

Chinese fencer (born 1988)

Personal information
- Nationality: China
- Born: 11 May 1988 (age 38) Changzhou, Jiangsu, China
- Height: 1.80 m (5 ft 11 in)
- Weight: 76 kg (168 lb)

Sport
- Sport: Fencing
- Event: Sabre
- Club: Nanjing Province Fencing; Team
- Coached by: Christian Bauer (FRA)
Medal record
Women's fencing
Representing China
Asian Games
Gold medal – first place	2010 Guangzhou	Team sabre

Zhu Min (Chinese: 朱敏; pinyin: Zhū Mǐn; born May 11, 1988, in Changzhou, Jiangsu) is a Chinese sabre fencer. She won a gold medal, as a member of the host nation's fencing team, in the same weapon at the 2010 Asian Games in Guangzhou. Zhu is also a member of the Nanjing Province Fencing Team, and is coached and trained by Christian Bauer of France.

Zhu represented China at the 2012 Summer Olympics in London, where she competed in the women's individual sabre event, along with her teammate Chen Xiaodong. She defeated Romania's Bianca Pascu and Russia's Yuliya Gavrilova in the preliminary rounds, before losing out the quarterfinal match to U.S. fencer and two-time Olympic champion Mariel Zagunis, with a final score of 10–15.

Zhu is married to fellow Jiangsu fencer Jiang Kelü.
