= Yekaterina Dyachenko =

Russian sabre fencer

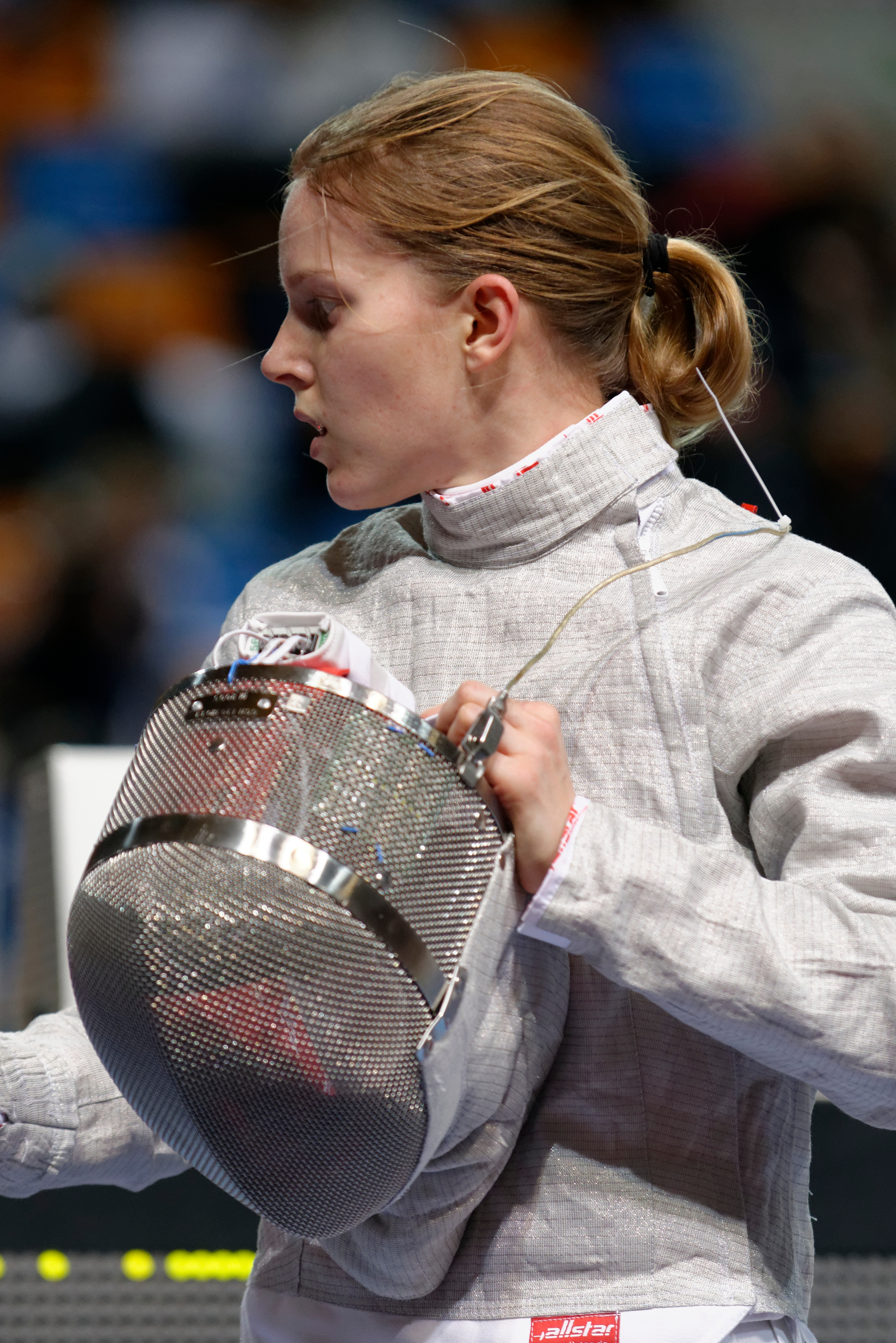
- Dyachenko in 2014

Personal information
- Full name: Yekaterina Vladimirovna Dyachenko
- Nationality: Russian
- Born: 31 August 1987 (age 38) Leningrad, Russian SFSR, Soviet Union
- Height: 1.67 m (5 ft 6 in)
- Weight: 53 kg (117 lb)

Fencing career
- Sport: Fencing
- Weapon: Sabre
- Hand: Right-handed
- National coach: Christian Bauer
- Club: Russian Army Sports Club
- Personal coach: Vladimir Dyachenko, Natalya Dyachenko
- FIE ranking: current ranking
Medal record
Olympic Games
| Gold medal – first place | 2016 Rio de Janeiro | Team sabre |
World Championships
| Gold medal – first place | 2011 Catania | Team sabre |
| Gold medal – first place | 2015 Moscow | Team sabre |
| Silver medal – second place | 2013 Budapest | Individual sabre |
| Silver medal – second place | 2013 Budapest | Team sabre |
| Bronze medal – third place | 2006 Torino | Individual sabre |
| Bronze medal – third place | 2014 Kazan | Individual sabre |
European Championships
| Gold medal – first place | 2006 İzmir | Team sabre |
| Gold medal – first place | 2012 Legnano | Team sabre |
| Gold medal – first place | 2013 Zagreb | Team sabre |
| Gold medal – first place | 2014 Strasbourg | Team sabre |
| Gold medal – first place | 2016 Toruń | Team sabre |
| Silver medal – second place | 2009 Plovdiv | Individual sabre |
| Silver medal – second place | 2009 Plovdiv | Team sabre |
| Silver medal – second place | 2010 Leipzig | Team sabre |
| Silver medal – second place | 2014 Strasbourg | Individual sabre |
| Bronze medal – third place | 2011 Sheffield | Team sabre |

Yekaterina Vladimirovna Dyachenko (Russian: Екатерина Владимировна Дьяченко, also known as Ekaterina Diatchenko, born 31 August 1987) is a Russian former sabre fencer. Dyachenko represented Russia at the 2008 Summer Olympics in Beijing, where she competed in two sabre events.

She is the daughter of fencing coaches Vladimir and Natalya Dyachenko and the sister of Aleksey Dyachenko, who won the bronze medal as a member of the Russian team in the men's team sabre at the 2004 Summer Olympics in Athens, Greece.

== Career ==
In the women's individual sabre at Beijing 2008, Dyachenko first defeated Japan's Madoka Hisagae in the table of 32, before losing out her next match to Ukraine's Olena Khomrova, with a sudden death score of 14–15. Few days later, she joined with her fellow fencers and teammates Ekaterina Fedorkina, Elena Nechaeva and Sofiya Velikaya for the women's team sabre. Dyachenko and her team won the fifth place match against the Polish team (led by Aleksandra Socha), with a total score of 45 touches.
