= Alexandra Bujdoso =

German-Hungarian sabre fencer

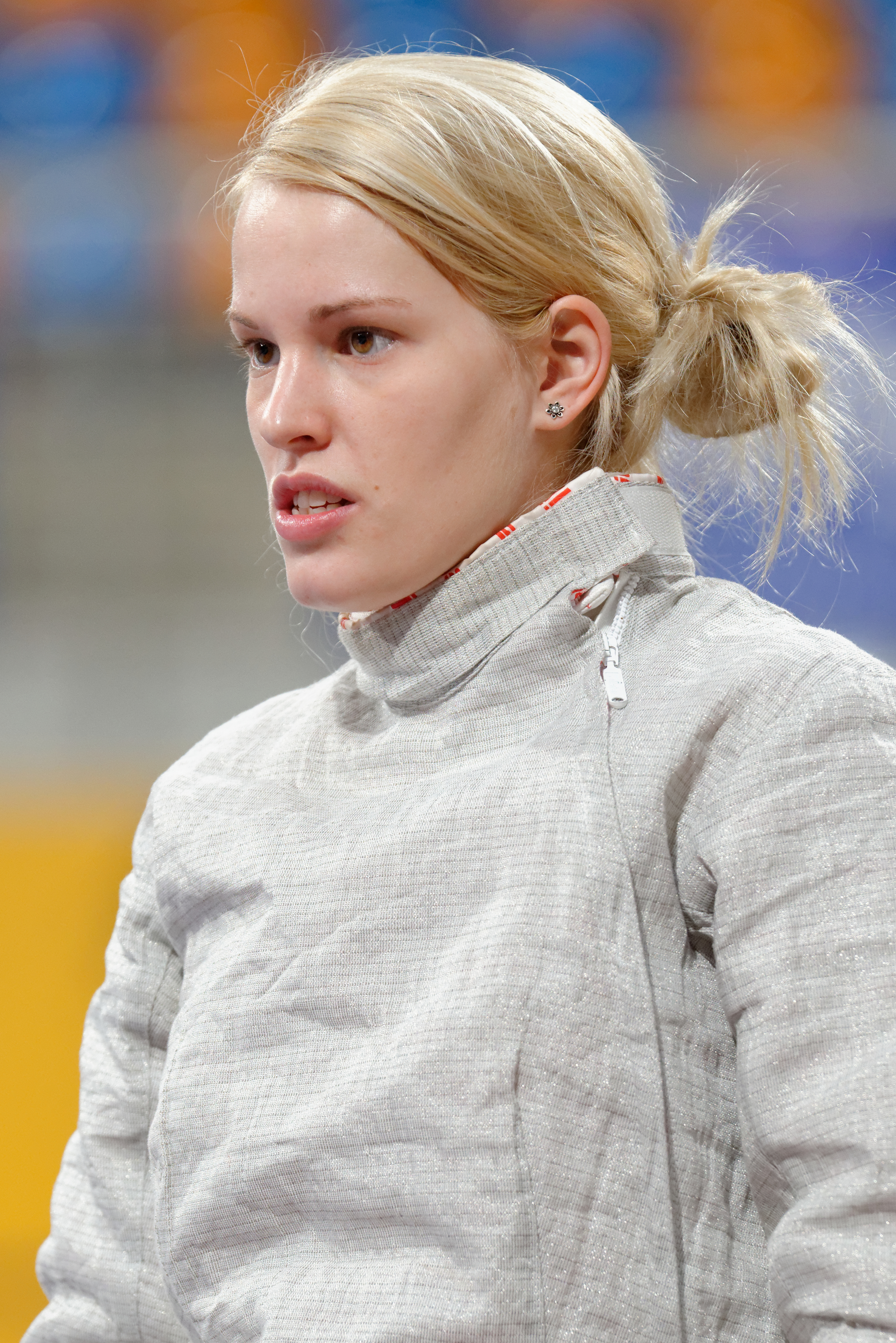
- Bujdoso in 2014

Personal information
- Born: 5 March 1990 (age 36) Budapest, Hungary
- Height: 1.66 m (5 ft 5 in)
- Weight: 53 kg (117 lb)

Fencing career
- Sport: Fencing
- Weapon: sabre
- Hand: right-handed
- Club: Königsbacher SC
- Head coach: Imre Bujdosó
- FIE ranking: current ranking

Alexandra Bujdoso (born 5 March 1990 in Budapest, Hungary) is a German-Hungarian sabre fencer.

She is coached by her father, Imre Bujdosó, a former world class fencer and Olympic champion. While still in the Cadets category, she won the 2005–06 junior Fencing World Cup. At the same time, she took a bronze medal at the Klagenfurt World Cup and reached the quarter-finals at the 2006 World Championships in Turin. She finished the season 11th in senior world rankings, a career best as of 2014. She won in 2008 a bronze medal at the Junior World Championships in Acireale.

Bujdoso took part in the 2008 Summer Olympics in Beijing, where she was eliminated in the second round by 2004 silver medallist Xue Tan. She participated again in the 2012 Summer Olympics in London where she was defeated in the round of 32 by Sabina Mikina of Azerbaijan.
