= María Belén Pérez Maurice =

Argentine fencer (born 1985)

Belén Pérez Maurice
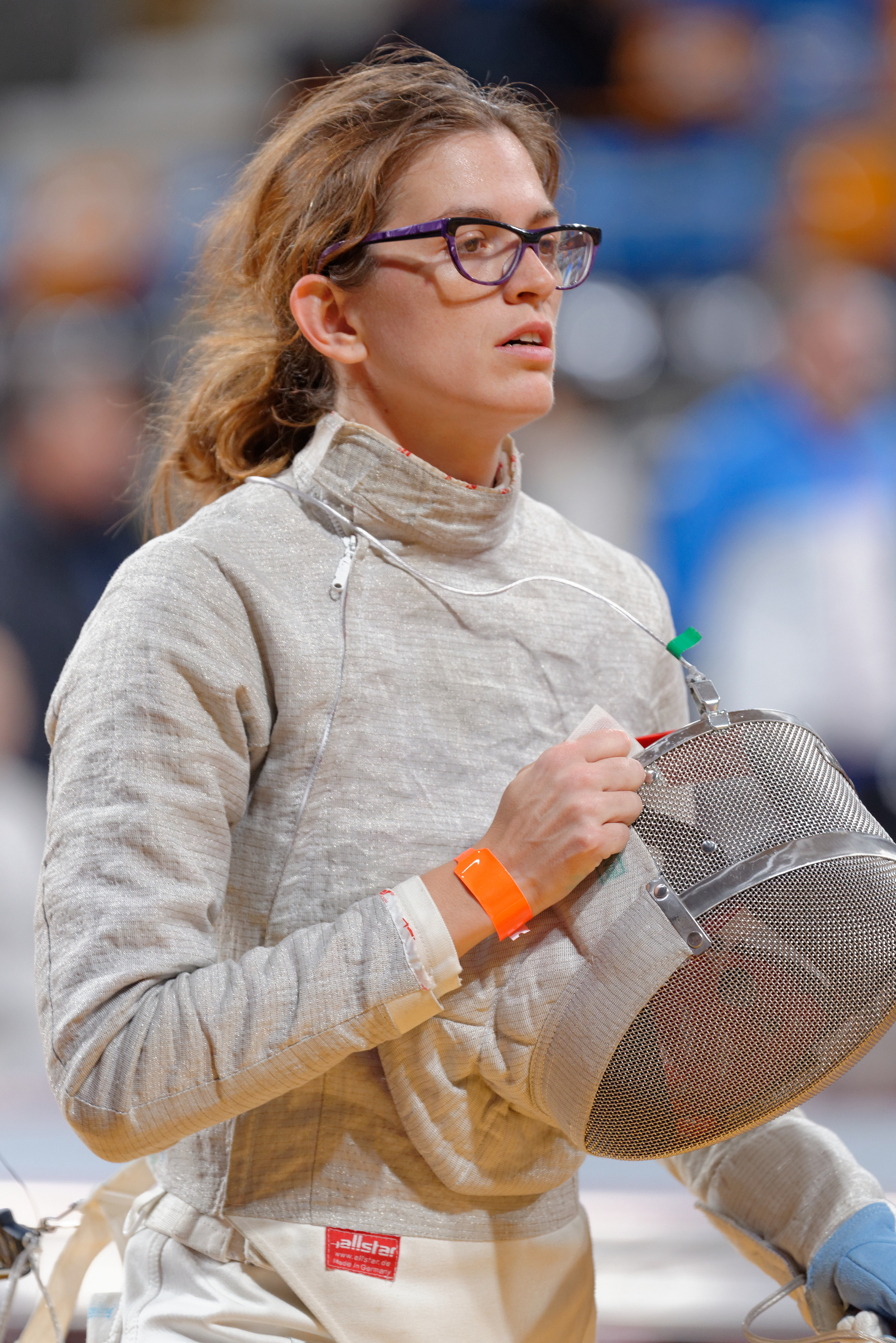

Personal information
- Full name: María Belén Pérez Maurice
- Nickname: Flaca
- Born: 12 July 1985 (age 40) San Nicolás, Buenos Aires, Argentina
- Height: 1.80 m (5 ft 11 in)
- Weight: 65 kg (143 lb)

Fencing career
- Sport: Fencing
- Country: Argentina
- Weapon: sabre
- Hand: left-handed
- National coach: Lucas Saucedo
- Club: Fundación Argentina de Esgrima
- FIE ranking: current ranking
Medal record
Women's sabre
Representing Argentina
Pan American Games
Bronze medal – third place	2015 Toronto	Individual
Silver medal – second place	2019 Lima	Individual
Pan American Championships
Gold medal – first place	2014 San José	Individual
Silver medal – second place	2026 Lima	Team
Bronze medal – third place	2011 Reno	Individual
Bronze medal – third place	2012 Cancún	Individual

María Belén Pérez Maurice (born 12 July 1985) is an Argentine sabre fencer who was Pan American champion in 2014. She was the only representative of the sport from Argentina at the 2012 Summer Olympics in London, the 2016 Summer Olympics in Rio, and the 2020 Summer Olympics in Tokyo.

== Career ==
Pérez Maurice started fencing at the age of thirteen at the instigation of her mother, an amateur fencer. She did not like the sport at first but took an interest after her first victory. She trained at the Círculo Militar in Buenos Aires–her father is a colonel in the Argentine Army– under Lucas Saucedo, who remains her coach as of 2014.

She first fenced foil, a weapon in which she reached the quarter-finals at the 2006 Buenos Aires World Cup, then switched to sabre for the 2006–07 season. She began a career as a fashion model parallel to her sport career but had to abandon it for lack of time. In 2011, she won two satellite tournaments and earned a bronze medal at the Pan American Championships in Reno, Nevada. These results allowed her to qualify for the 2012 Summer Olympics as one of the top two fencers from the American zone. She is the first Argentine to gain Olympic access through FIE rankings. She lost 15–12 in the first round to Italy's Gioia Marzocca and finished 21st. In the 2013–14 season she won the gold medal at the Pan American Championships in San José after defeating Olympic champion Mariel Zagunis in the final. She finished the season No.21 in world rankings, a career-best.

Pérez Maurice studied food engineering at the Universidad Argentina de la Empresa.

María Belén won the bronze medal at the 2015 Pan American Games in Toronto, Canada.

She competed at the 2020 Summer Olympics. She lost to Manon Brunet in the bronze medal match. She accepted a marriage proposal from her coach and partner Lucas Saucedo.
