= Aleksandra Shelton =

Polish fencer (born 1982)

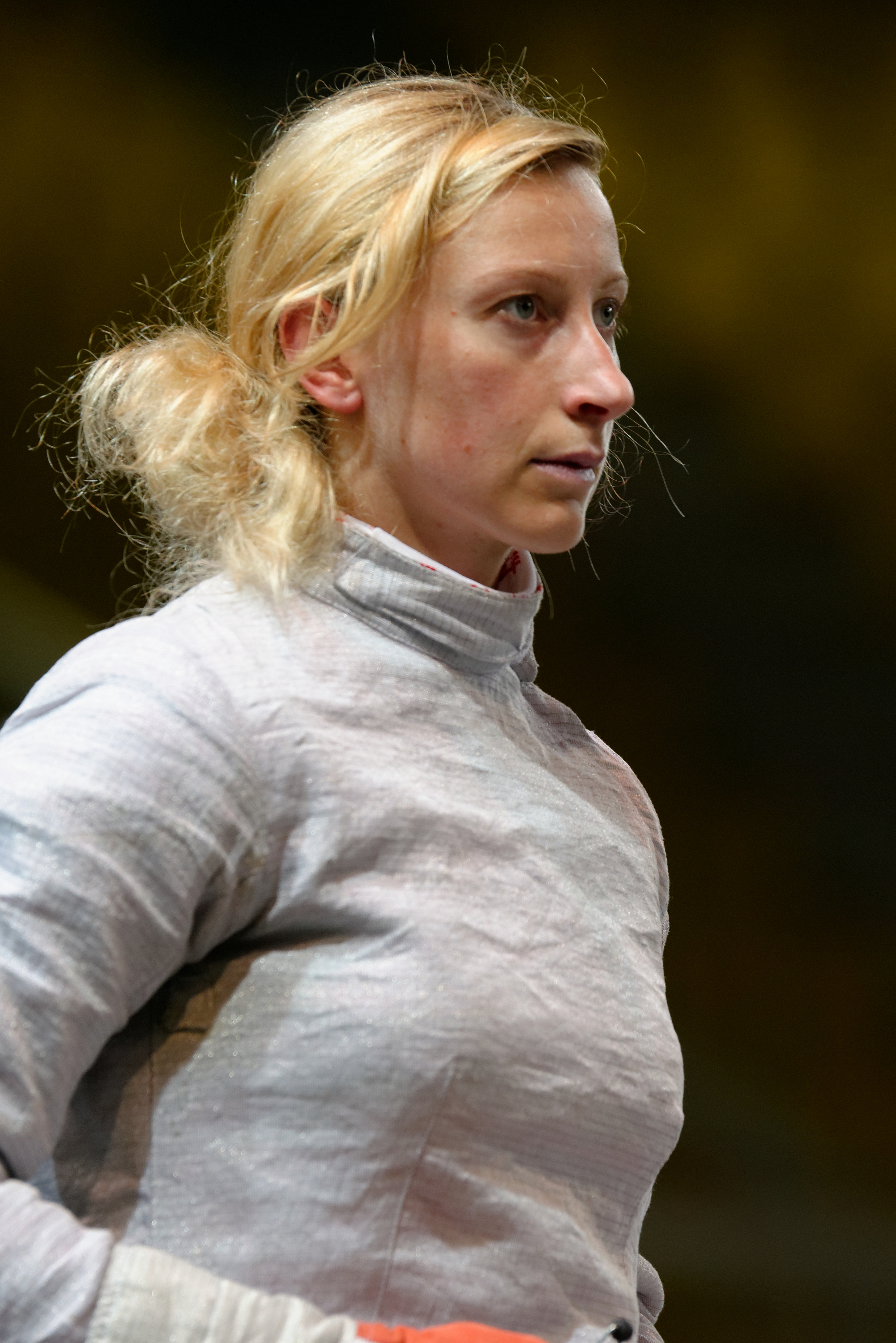
- At the 2014 European Fencing Championships

Personal information
- Born: 30 March 1982 (age 44) Pabianice, Poland
- Height: 1.74 m (5 ft 9 in)
- Weight: 63 kg (139 lb)
- Website: www.olasocha.pl

Fencing career
- Sport: Fencing
- Weapon: sabre
- Hand: Right-handed
- Club: GS Wojsk Lądowych
- FIE ranking: current ranking
Medal record
Women's sabre fencing
Representing Poland
World Championships
Bronze medal – third place	2003 Havana	Individual sabre
European Championships
Gold medal – first place	2004 Copenhagen	Individual sabre
Gold medal – first place	2008 Kyiv	Team sabre
Silver medal – second place	2006 Izmir	Team sabre
Silver medal – second place	2011 Sheffield	Individual sabre
Bronze medal – third place	2001 Koblenz	Team sabre
Bronze medal – third place	2012 Legnano	Individual sabre
Bronze medal – third place	2013 Zagreb	Individual sabre

Aleksandra Anna Socha Shelton (born 30 March 1982) is a Polish sabre fencer, bronze medal in the 2003 World Fencing Championships, European champion in 2004, and European team in 2008. She represented Poland at the time.

== Career ==
Socha was the Polish champion in sabre for the years 1999, 2002, 2003, 2008, 2010, and 2015. As a member of the Polish Sabre Fencing Team she won medals at the European Championships in 2001 (bronze), 2006 (silver), and 2008 (gold). In Individual Sabre she won a gold medal at the 2004 European Fencing Championships and silver at the 2011 European Fencing Championships, as well as gold medals, team and individual, in the 2010 Military Fencing Championship in Caracas, Venezuela, and the 2011 Military World Games in Rio de Janeiro.

She was a member of the Polish Olympic Team for the 2004 Summer Olympics in Athens, the 2008 Summer Olympics in Beijing, and the 2012 Summer Olympics in London.

Aleksandra Socha (Ola) was going to represent Poland in Women's sabre and Women's team sabre at the 2016 Summer Olympics in Rio de Janeiro.

== Personal life ==
Socha graduated from Middle School Nr 2 in Pabianice at age 15 and moved to Warsaw to attend Sport Championship High School and Józef Piłsudski University of Physical Education (Polish: Akademia Wychowania Fizycznego Józefa Piłsudskiego w Warszawie) where she obtained a master's degree in physical education. She is married to Bradley Shelton of Sheridan, Arkansas. She is a certified fencing coach, a fitness trainer, as well as a soldier in the 3rd Command Support Battalion of the Polish Land Forces stationed in Warsaw.
