= Irene Vecchi =

Italian fencer (born 1989)

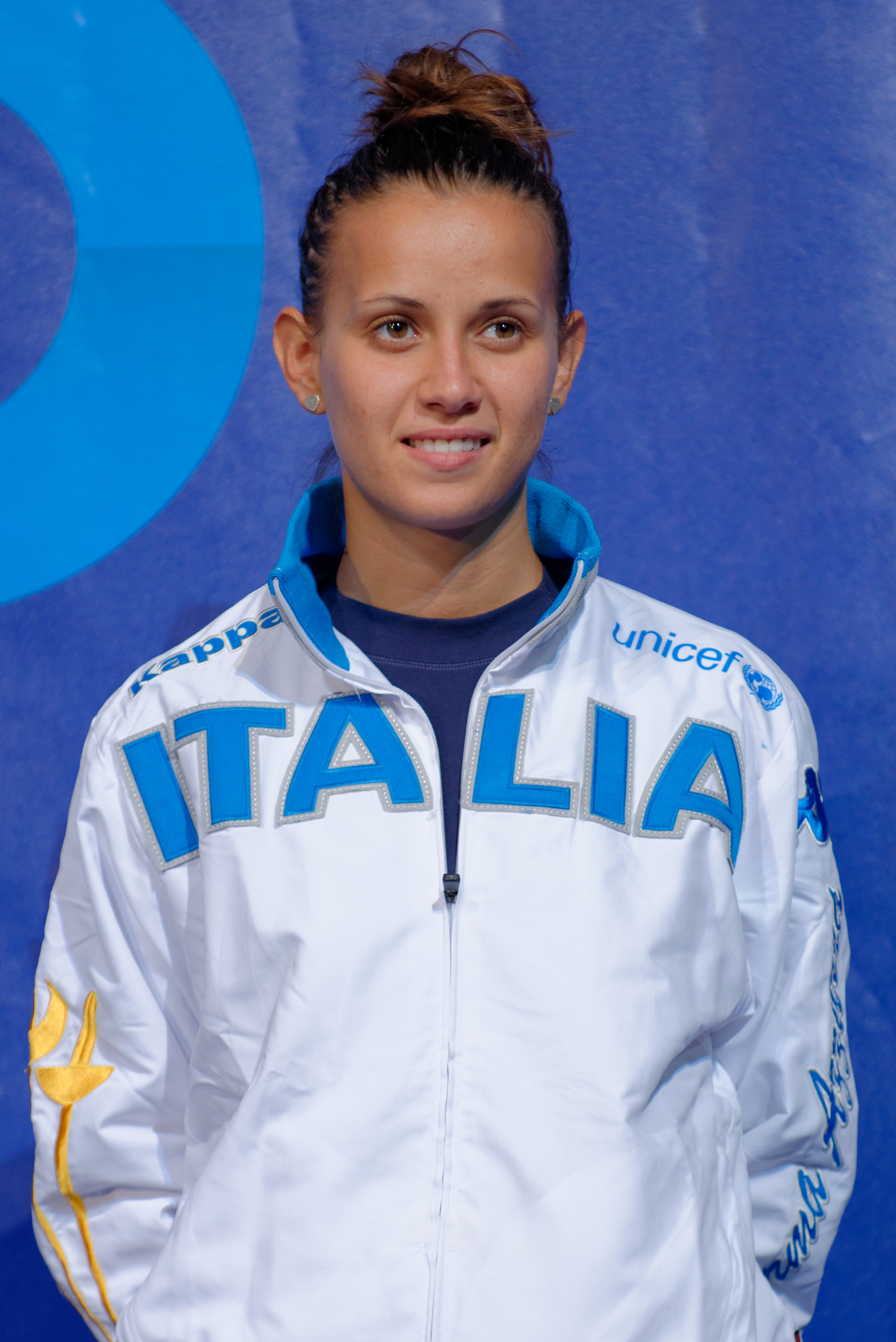
- Vecchi at the 2013 World Fencing Championships

Personal information
- Born: 10 June 1989 (age 37) Livorno
- Height: 1.70 m (5 ft 7 in)
- Weight: 64 kg (141 lb)

Fencing career
- Sport: Fencing
- Country: Italy
- Weapon: Sabre
- Hand: right-handed
- Club: GS Fiamme Gialle
- Head coach: Nicola Zanotti
- FIE ranking: current ranking
Medal record
World Championships
Gold medal – first place	2017 Leipzig	Team
Bronze medal – third place	2013 Budapest	Sabre
Bronze medal – third place	2017 Leipzig	Sabre
European Championships
Gold medal – first place	2011 Sheffield	Team Sabre
Gold medal – first place	2017 Tbilisi	Team Sabre
Bronze medal – third place	2009 Plovdiv	Team Sabre
Bronze medal – third place	2010 Leipzig	Team Sabre
Bronze medal – third place	2012 Legnano	Team Sabre
Bronze medal – third place	2013 Zagreb	Sabre
Bronze medal – third place	2013 Zagreb	Team Sabre

Irene Vecchi (10 June 1989, Livorno) is an Italian sabre fencer. She earned a bronze medal in the 2013 World Championships and 2017 World Championships, an individual bronze at the 2013 European Championships and won the team gold medal at the 2011 European Fencing Championships.

She has twice competed for Italy at the Olympics, in the women's sabre individual in 2012 and 2016 and in the women's team sabre in 2016. She competed at the 2020 Summer Olympics, in Sabre

== Life ==
Vecchi has a degree in political science from the University of Pisa, and works as a police officer. She began to fence at the age of eight; her mother worked at a fencing hall and enrolled her.
