= Men's épée at the 2026 World Fencing Championships =

- Venue: AsiaWorld–Expo
- Location: Hong Kong
- Dates: 23 July (preliminaries); 26 July (finals)
- Competitors: 229 from 81 nations

Medalists
gold medal	Lucas Malcotti	Switzerland
silver medal	Davide Di Veroli	Italy
bronze medal	Masaru Yamada	Japan
bronze medal	Khalifah Al-Omairi	Saudi Arabia

The Men's épée competition at the 2026 World Fencing Championships was held on 23 and 26 July 2026.

== Draw ==
=== Finals ===
Semifinals
(Japan) Masaru Yamada	13
(Italy) Davide Di Veroli	15
(Switzerland) Lucas Malcotti	13
(Saudi Arabia) Khalifah Al-Omairi	12

Final
(Italy) Davide Di Veroli	11
(Switzerland) Lucas Malcotti	12

=== Top half ===
==== Section 1 ====
Round of 64
(Egypt) Mohamed El-Sayed	15
(Poland) Mateusz Antkiewicz	4
(Austria) Josef Mahringer	15
(United States) Elijah Imrek	14
(Belgium) Neisser Loyola	15
(Israel) Alon Sarid	7
(Portugal) Filipe Frazão	8
(Hungary) Tibor Andrásfi	15
(Denmark) Conrad Kongstad	14
(Slovakia) Lukáš Johanides	13
(Kazakhstan) Kirill Prokhodov	15
(Finland) Kerkko Järvi	5
(Canada) Leon Xiao	9
(Switzerland) Sven Vineis	15
(Canada) David Gornovsky	8
(Japan) Masaru Yamada	15

Round of 32
(Egypt) Mohamed El-Sayed	15
(Austria) Josef Mahringer	13
(Belgium) Neisser Loyola	13
(Hungary) Tibor Andrásfi	15
(Denmark) Conrad Kongstad	9
(Kazakhstan) Kirill Prokhodov	15
(Switzerland) Sven Vineis	11
(Japan) Masaru Yamada	15

Round of 16
(Egypt) Mohamed El-Sayed	15
(Hungary) Tibor Andrásfi	13
(Kazakhstan) Kirill Prokhodov	11
(Japan) Masaru Yamada	15

Quarterfinals
(Egypt) Mohamed El-Sayed	10
(Japan) Masaru Yamada	11

==== Section 2 ====
Round of 64
(Kazakhstan) Ruslan Kurbanov	15
(Israel) Yehonathan Messika	7
(Poland) Jan Socha	9
(Japan) Ryu Matsumoto	15
(Argentina) Jesús Lugones	15
(Estonia) Kasper Tafenau	14
(France) Paul Fortin	15
(Ukraine) Nikita Koshman	10
(Italy) Davide Di Veroli	15
(Morocco) Houssam El Kord	12
(Kazakhstan) Vadim Sharlaimov	9
(United States Virgin Islands) Kruz Schembri	15
(Israel) Yonatan Cohen	12
(France) Alexandre Bardenet	15
(United States) Oleg Knysh	15
(Netherlands) Tristan Tulen	14

Round of 32
(Kazakhstan) Ruslan Kurbanov	9
(Japan) Ryu Matsumoto	10
(Argentina) Jesús Lugones	15
(France) Paul Fortin	12
(Italy) Davide Di Veroli	15
(United States Virgin Islands) Kruz Schembri	13
(France) Alexandre Bardenet	15
(United States) Oleg Knysh	14

Round of 16
(Japan) Ryu Matsumoto	15
(Argentina) Jesús Lugones	11
(Italy) Davide Di Veroli	14
(France) Alexandre Bardenet	12

Quarterfinals
(Japan) Ryu Matsumoto	13
(Italy) Davide Di Veroli	14

=== Bottom half ===
==== Section 3 ====
Round of 64
(Italy) Matteo Galassi	15
(Portugal) Miguel Frazão	14
(Russia) Dmitrii Shvelidze	15
(Croatia) Vedran Markota	4
(Egypt) Mahmoud Mohsen	13
(Spain) Manuel Bargues	14
(Uzbekistan) Vadim Anokhin	11
(Ukraine) Roman Svichkar	15
(Hungary) Dávid Nagy	12
(Hong Kong) Ng Ho Tin	15
(Estonia) Sten Priinits	11
(Switzerland) Lucas Malcotti	15
(Kazakhstan) Yerlik Sertay	10
(South Korea) Kwon O-min	15
(Hong Kong) Ho Wai Hang	5
(Hungary) Gergely Siklósi	15

Round of 32
(Italy) Matteo Galassi	12
(Russia) Dmitrii Shvelidze	15
(Spain) Manuel Bargues	9
(Ukraine) Roman Svichkar	10
(Hong Kong) Ng Ho Tin	4
(Switzerland) Lucas Malcotti	15
(South Korea) Kwon O-min	13
(Hungary) Gergely Siklósi	15

Round of 16
(Russia) Dmitrii Shvelidze	15
(Ukraine) Roman Svichkar	10
(Switzerland) Lucas Malcotti	15
(Hungary) Gergely Siklósi	11

Quarterfinals
(Russia) Dmitrii Shvelidze	11
(Switzerland) Lucas Malcotti	12

==== Section 4 ====
Round of 64
(Italy) Simone Mencarelli	15
(South Korea) Park Sang-young	8
(Japan) Akira Komata	10
(Israel) Dov Ber Vilensky	15
(Luxembourg) Flavio Giannotte	14
(Saudi Arabia) Khalifah Al-Omairi	15
(South Korea) Jang Hyo-min	15
(Czech Republic) Jakub Jurka	14
(Hungary) Máté Tamás Koch	15
(France) Aymerick Gally	5
(Canada) Dylan French	13
(Czech Republic) Martin Rubeš	15
(Russia) Dmitriy Gusev	15
(Switzerland) Alexis Bayard	9
(Turkey) Doruk Erolçevik	7
(Japan) Koki Kano	15

Round of 32
(Italy) Simone Mencarelli	15
(Israel) Dov Ber Vilensky	7
(Saudi Arabia) Khalifah Al-Omairi	8
(South Korea) Jang Hyo-min	7
(Hungary) Máté Tamás Koch	13
(Czech Republic) Martin Rubeš	8
(Russia) Dmitriy Gusev	6
(Japan) Koki Kano	15

Round of 16
(Italy) Simone Mencarelli	10
(Saudi Arabia) Khalifah Al-Omairi	15
(Hungary) Máté Tamás Koch	12
(Japan) Koki Kano	15

Quarterfinals
(Saudi Arabia) Khalifah Al-Omairi	15
(Japan) Koki Kano	12
