= Fencing at the 2026 Asian Games – Men's individual épée =

Men's individual épée at the 2026 Asian Games
- Venue: Aichi Sky Expo Hall F
- Date: 24 September 2026
- Competitors: 41 from 22 nations

Medalists
gold medal	Koki Kano	Japan
silver medal	Kirill Prokhodov	Kazakhstan
bronze medal	Fong Hoi Sun	Hong Kong
bronze medal	Masaru Yamada	Japan

The men's individual épée competition at the 2026 Asian Games in Nagoya was held on 24 September 2026 at the Aichi Sky Expo Hall F. Japan's Koki Kano defeated Kirill Prokhodov of Kazakhstan 15–13 in the final to win the gold medal.

== Schedule ==
All times are Japan Standard Time (UTC+09:00)

Date	Time	Event
Thursday, 24 September 2026	10:00	Round of pools
Thursday, 24 September 2026	12:15	Table of 64
Thursday, 24 September 2026	13:00	Table of 32
Thursday, 24 September 2026	13:55	Table of 16
Thursday, 24 September 2026	15:05	Quarterfinals
Thursday, 24 September 2026	17:00	Semifinals
Thursday, 24 September 2026	18:20	Gold medal bout

== Results ==
=== Round of pools ===
==== Pool 1 ====
Athlete	OMA	KGZ	VIE	TPE	LBN	QAT	JPN
Al Harith Al Harthi (OMA)	—	5–3	2–5	3–5	4–5	5–4	0–5
Rustam Islamov (KGZ)	3–5	—	5–3	3–5	5–4	2–5	5–4
Hoàng Nhật Nam (VIE)	5–2	3–5	—	5–4	2–1	5–3	2–5
Yilu Gaston Guillemot (TPE)	5–3	5–3	4–5	—	3–4	5–2	2–5
Antoine Elchoueiri (LBN)	5–4	4–5	1–2	4–3	—	5–2	2–4
Youssef Abdeltawab (QAT)	4–5	5–2	3–5	2–5	2–5	—	2–5
Koki Kano (JPN)	5–0	4–5	5–2	5–2	4–2	5–2	—

Legend: Blue = left column team win; Red = top row team win.

==== Pool 2 ====
Athlete	BAN	JPN	KGZ	MGL	HKG	PAK	QAT
Md Imtiaj (BAN)	—	0–5	2–5	2–5	2–5	5–4	3–5
Masaru Yamada (JPN)	5–0	—	5–4	5–1	5–3	5–2	5–4
Ilim Bakytbek Uulu (KGZ)	5–2	4–5	—	5–1	2–5	5–3	3–2
Munkhkhasar Ulaankhuu (MGL)	5–2	1–5	1–5	—	3–2	5–2	3–2
Ng Ho Tin (HKG)	5–2	3–5	5–2	2–3	—	5–2	3–0
Muhammad Waqas (PAK)	4–5	2–5	3–5	2–5	2–5	—	2–5
Abdulrahman Aljadra (QAT)	5–3	4–5	2–3	2–3	0–3	5–2	—

Legend: Blue = left column team win; Red = top row team win.

==== Pool 3 ====
Athlete	CHN	TJK	PHI	KAZ	BAN	VIE	SGP
Lan Minghao (CHN)	—	5–1	5–2	1–2	5–1	5–4	5–1
Muhammad Askarshozoda (TJK)	1–5	—	1–5	1–5	3–5	3–5	1–5
Miguel Bautista (PHI)	2–5	5–1	—	3–5	5–4	2–5	1–5
Ruslan Kurbanov (KAZ)	2–1	5–1	5–3	—	5–0	5–4	1–2
Md Hasan Ali (BAN)	1–5	5–3	4–5	0–5	—	2–5	3–5
Nguyễn Phước Đến (VIE)	4–5	5–3	5–2	4–5	5–2	—	3–5
Si To Jian Tong (SGP)	1–5	5–1	5–1	2–1	5–3	5–3	—

Legend: Blue = left column team win; Red = top row team win.

==== Pool 4 ====
Athlete	KUW	OMA	KOR	KSA	KAZ	JOR	CHN
Abdulrahman Al-Mane (KUW)	—	5–3	4–5	1–5	1–5	5–1	2–5
Saeed Al Shuaibi (OMA)	3–5	—	0–5	2–5	0–4	0–5	3–5
Jang Hyo-min (KOR)	5–4	5–0	—	5–3	3–2	5–2	3–5
Hassan Hazem Abed (KSA)	5–1	5–2	3–5	—	4–5	5–1	4–5
Kirill Prokhodov (KAZ)	5–1	4–0	2–3	5–4	—	5–1	5–4
Iyad Odeh (JOR)	1–5	5–0	2–5	1–5	1–5	—	1–5
Zhang Xinkun (CHN)	5–2	5–3	5–3	5–4	4–5	5–1	—

Legend: Blue = left column team win; Red = top row team win.

==== Pool 5 ====
Athlete	UAE	PAK	SGP	KSA	MGL	HKG	UZB
Khalifa Al-Zarooni (UAE)	—	5–2	4–5	2–1	3–2	1–4	3–5
Abdul Musawir (PAK)	2–5	—	2–5	2–5	3–5	1–5	2–5
Simon Renjie Lee (SGP)	5–4	5–2	—	3–5	5–2	1–4	4–5
Khalifah Al-Omairi (KSA)	1–2	5–2	5–3	—	5–3	1–4	5–2
Gandul Batbyamba (MGL)	2–3	5–3	2–5	3–5	—	2–5	5–4
Fong Hoi Sun (HKG)	4–1	5–1	4–1	4–1	5–2	—	3–1
Meyirkhan Timurov (UZB)	5–3	5–2	5–4	2–5	4–5	1–3	—

Legend: Blue = left column team win; Red = top row team win.

==== Pool 6 ====
Athlete	UAE	PHI	TPE	KUW	KOR	UZB
Salha Alblooshi (UAE)	—	5–3	2–5	5–3	2–5	3–5
Noelito Jose (PHI)	3–5	—	5–2	5–2	2–5	5–2
Lee Rang (TPE)	5–2	2–5	—	5–2	3–5	5–3
Hasan Alfudari (KUW)	3–5	2–5	2–5	—	4–5	3–5
Park Sang-young (KOR)	5–2	5–2	5–3	5–4	—	0–5
Vadim Anokhin (UZB)	5–3	2–5	3–5	5–3	5–0	—

Legend: Blue = left column team win; Red = top row team win.

==== Summary ====
Rank	Pool	Athlete	W	L	W/M	TD	TF
1	5	Fong Hoi Sun (HKG)	6	0	1.000	+18	25
2	2	Masaru Yamada (JPN)	6	0	1.000	+16	30
3	1	Koki Kano (JPN)	5	1	0.833	+15	28
4	3	Lan Minghao (CHN)	5	1	0.833	+15	26
5	4	Kirill Prokhodov (KAZ)	5	1	0.833	+13	26
6	3	Ruslan Kurbanov (KAZ)	5	1	0.833	+12	23
7	4	Zhang Xinkun (CHN)	5	1	0.833	+11	29
8	4	Jang Hyo-min (KOR)	5	1	0.833	+10	26
9	3	Si To Jian Tong (SGP)	5	1	0.833	+9	23
10	6	Park Sang-young (KOR)	4	1	0.800	+4	20
11	2	Ng Ho Tin (HKG)	4	2	0.667	+9	23
12	2	Ilim Bakytbek Uulu (KGZ)	4	2	0.667	+6	24
13	5	Khalifah Al-Omairi (KSA)	4	2	0.667	+6	22
14	1	Hoàng Nhật Nam (VIE)	4	2	0.667	+2	22
15	2	Munkhkhasar Ulaankhuu (MGL)	4	2	0.667	+0	18
16	6	Vadim Anokhin (UZB)	3	2	0.600	+4	20
16	6	Noelito Jose (PHI)	3	2	0.600	+4	20
18	6	Lee Rang (TPE)	3	2	0.600	+3	20
19	4	Hassan Hazem Abed (KSA)	3	3	0.500	+7	26
20	3	Nguyễn Phước Đến (VIE)	3	3	0.500	+4	26
21	1	Yilu Gaston Guillemot (TPE)	3	3	0.500	+2	24
22	5	Simon Renjie Lee (SGP)	3	3	0.500	+1	23
23	1	Antoine Elchoueiri (LBN)	3	3	0.500	+1	21
24	5	Meyirkhan Timurov (UZB)	3	3	0.500	+0	22
25	5	Khalifa Al-Zarooni (UAE)	3	3	0.500	−1	18
26	1	Rustam Islamov (KGZ)	3	3	0.500	−3	23
27	6	Salha Alblooshi (UAE)	2	3	0.400	−4	17
28	2	Abdulrahman Aljadra (QAT)	2	4	0.333	−1	18
29	5	Gandul Batbyamba (MGL)	2	4	0.333	−6	19
30	4	Abdulrahman Al-Mane (KUW)	2	4	0.333	−6	18
31	3	Miguel Bautista (PHI)	2	4	0.333	−7	18
32	1	Al Harith Al Harthi (OMA)	2	4	0.333	−8	19
33	1	Youssef Abdeltawab (QAT)	1	5	0.167	−9	18
34	3	Md Hasan Ali (BAN)	1	5	0.167	−13	15
35	4	Iyad Odeh (JOR)	1	5	0.167	−14	11
36	2	Md Imtiaj (BAN)	1	5	0.167	−15	14
37	6	Hasan Alfudari (KUW)	0	5	0.000	−11	14
38	2	Muhammad Waqas (PAK)	0	6	0.000	−15	15
39	5	Abdul Musawir (PAK)	0	6	0.000	−18	12
40	3	Muhammad Askarshozoda (TJK)	0	6	0.000	−20	10
41	4	Saeed Al Shuaibi (OMA)	0	6	0.000	−21	8

=== Knockout round ===
==== Table of 64 ====
Table of 64
32	Al Harith Al Harthi (OMA)	9
33	Youssef Abdeltawab (QAT)	15

==== Final ====
Gold medal bout
5	Kirill Prokhodov (KAZ)	13
3	Koki Kano (JPN)	15

==== Top half ====
Table of 32
1	Fong Hoi Sun (HKG)	15
33	Youssef Abdeltawab (QAT)	13
17	Vadim Anokhin (UZB)	12
16	Noelito Jose (PHI)	15
9	Si To Jian Tong (SGP)	15
24	Meyirkhan Timurov (UZB)	13
25	Khalifa Al-Zarooni (UAE)	5
8	Jang Hyo-min (KOR)	15
5	Kirill Prokhodov (KAZ)	15
28	Abdulrahman Aljadra (QAT)	2
21	Yilu Gaston Guillemot (TPE)	15
12	Ilim Bakytbek Uulu (KGZ)	11
13	Khalifah Al-Omairi (KSA)	12
20	Nguyễn Phước Đến (VIE)	15
29	Gandul Batbyamba (MGL)	9
4	Lan Minghao (CHN)	15

Table of 16
1	Fong Hoi Sun (HKG)	14
16	Noelito Jose (PHI)	13
9	Si To Jian Tong (SGP)	12
8	Jang Hyo-min (KOR)	15
5	Kirill Prokhodov (KAZ)	15
21	Yilu Gaston Guillemot (TPE)	14
20	Nguyễn Phước Đến (VIE)	8
4	Lan Minghao (CHN)	8

Quarterfinals
1	Fong Hoi Sun (HKG)	13
8	Jang Hyo-min (KOR)	12
5	Kirill Prokhodov (KAZ)	15
4	Lan Minghao (CHN)	7

Semifinals
1	Fong Hoi Sun (HKG)	13
5	Kirill Prokhodov (KAZ)	15

==== Bottom half ====
Table of 32
3	Koki Kano (JPN)	15
30	Abdulrahman Al-Mane (KUW)	7
19	Hassan Hazem Abed (KSA)	15
14	Hoàng Nhật Nam (VIE)	9
11	Ng Ho Tin (HKG)	14
22	Simon Renjie Lee (SGP)	11
27	Salha Alblooshi (UAE)	5
6	Ruslan Kurbanov (KAZ)	15
7	Zhang Xinkun (CHN)	15
26	Rustam Islamov (KGZ)	8
23	Antoine Elchoueiri (LBN)	12
10	Park Sang-young (KOR)	15
15	Munkhkhasar Ulaankhuu (MGL)	10
18	Lee Rang (TPE)	15
31	Miguel Bautista (PHI)	8
2	Masaru Yamada (JPN)	15

Table of 16
3	Koki Kano (JPN)	15
19	Hassan Hazem Abed (KSA)	13
11	Ng Ho Tin (HKG)	15
6	Ruslan Kurbanov (KAZ)	9
7	Zhang Xinkun (CHN)	15
10	Park Sang-young (KOR)	13
18	Lee Rang (TPE)	12
2	Masaru Yamada (JPN)	15

Quarterfinals
3	Koki Kano (JPN)	15
11	Ng Ho Tin (HKG)	8
7	Zhang Xinkun (CHN)	9
2	Masaru Yamada (JPN)	15

Semifinals
3	Koki Kano (JPN)	15
2	Masaru Yamada (JPN)	11

== Final standing ==
Rank	Athlete
1st place, gold medalist(s)	Koki Kano (JPN)
2nd place, silver medalist(s)	Kirill Prokhodov (KAZ)
3rd place, bronze medalist(s)	Fong Hoi Sun (HKG)
3rd place, bronze medalist(s)	Masaru Yamada (JPN)
5	Lan Minghao (CHN)
6	Zhang Xinkun (CHN)
7	Jang Hyo-min (KOR)
8	Ng Ho Tin (HKG)
9	Ruslan Kurbanov (KAZ)
10	Si To Jian Tong (SGP)
11	Park Sang-young (KOR)
12	Noelito Jose (PHI)
13	Lee Rang (TPE)
14	Hassan Hazem Abed (KSA)
15	Nguyễn Phước Đến (VIE)
16	Yilu Gaston Guillemot (TPE)
17	Ilim Bakytbek Uulu (KGZ)
18	Khalifah Al-Omairi (KSA)
19	Hoàng Nhật Nam (VIE)
20	Munkhkhasar Ulaankhuu (MGL)
21	Vadim Anokhin (UZB)
22	Simon Renjie Lee (SGP)
23	Antoine Elchoueiri (LBN)
24	Meyirkhan Timurov (UZB)
25	Khalifa Al-Zarooni (UAE)
26	Rustam Islamov (KGZ)
27	Salha Alblooshi (UAE)
28	Abdulrahman Aljadra (QAT)
29	Gandul Batbyamba (MGL)
30	Abdulrahman Al-Mane (KUW)
31	Miguel Bautista (PHI)
32	Youssef Abdeltawab (QAT)
33	Al Harith Al Harthi (OMA)
34	Md Hasan Ali (BAN)
35	Iyad Odeh (JOR)
36	Md Imtiaj (BAN)
37	Hasan Alfudari (KUW)
38	Muhammad Waqas (PAK)
39	Abdul Musawir (PAK)
40	Muhammad Askarshozoda (TJK)
41	Saeed Al Shuaibi (OMA)
