= Fencing at the 2022 Asian Games – Men's team épée =

Men's team épée at the 2022 Asian Games
- Venue: Hangzhou Dianzi University Gymnasium
- Date: 29 September 2023
- Competitors: 53 from 14 nations

Medalists
gold medal	Japan; Koki Kano, Akira Komata, Ryu Matsumoto, Masaru Yamada
silver medal	Kazakhstan; Elmir Alimzhanov, Ruslan Kurbanov, Yerlik Sertay, Vadim Sharlaimov
bronze medal	South Korea; Kim Jae-won, Kweon Young-jun, Ma Se-geon, Son Tae-jin
bronze medal	Hong Kong; Fong Hoi Sun, Ho Wai Hang, Lau Ho Fung, Ng Ho Tin

The men's team épée competition at the 2022 Asian Games in Hangzhou was held on 29 September 2023 at the Hangzhou Dianzi University Gymnasium.

== Schedule ==
All times are China Standard Time (UTC+08:00)

Date	Time	Event
Friday, 29 September 2023	12:00	Table of 16
Friday, 29 September 2023	14:30	Quarterfinals
Friday, 29 September 2023	16:00	Semifinals
Friday, 29 September 2023	18:35	Gold medal match

== Seeding ==
The teams were seeded taking into account the results achieved by competitors representing each team in the individual event.

Rank	Team	Fencer		Total
Rank	Team	1	2	Total
1	Japan (JPN)	1	2	3
2	Hong Kong (HKG)	3	5	8
3	Kazakhstan (KAZ)	3	9	12
4	China (CHN)	7	10	17
5	South Korea (KOR)	6	12	18
6	Philippines (PHI)	8	19	27
7	Uzbekistan (UZB)	13	15	28
8	Saudi Arabia (KSA)	11	22	33
9	Thailand (THA)	18	21	39
10	Kyrgyzstan (KGZ)	17	24	41
11	Vietnam (VIE)	14	29	43
12	Kuwait (KUW)	19	28	47
13	United Arab Emirates (UAE)	23	27	50
14	Mongolia (MGL)	26	30	56

== Results ==
Table of 16
9	Thailand	28
8	Saudi Arabia	45
5	South Korea	45
12	Kuwait	29
13	United Arab Emirates	31
4	China	45
3	Kazakhstan	45
14	Mongolia	12
11	Vietnam	45
6	Philippines	29
7	Uzbekistan	45
10	Kyrgyzstan	35

Quarterfinals
1	Japan	45
8	Saudi Arabia	43
5	South Korea	45
4	China	41
3	Kazakhstan	45
11	Vietnam	26
7	Uzbekistan	31
2	Hong Kong	45

Semifinals
1	Japan	45
5	South Korea	34
3	Kazakhstan	45
2	Hong Kong	30

Gold medal match
1	Japan	36
2	Kazakhstan	35

== Final standing ==
Rank	Team
1st place, gold medalist(s)	Japan (JPN); Koki Kano; Akira Komata; Ryu Matsumoto; Masaru Yamada
2nd place, silver medalist(s)	Kazakhstan (KAZ); Elmir Alimzhanov; Ruslan Kurbanov; Yerlik Sertay; Vadim Sharlaimov
3rd place, bronze medalist(s)	South Korea (KOR); Kim Jae-won; Kweon Young-jun; Ma Se-geon; Son Tae-jin
3rd place, bronze medalist(s)	Hong Kong (HKG); Fong Hoi Sun; Ho Wai Hang; Lau Ho Fung; Ng Ho Tin
5	China (CHN); Lan Minghao; Wang Zijie; Yang Fengming; Yu Lefan
6	Uzbekistan (UZB); Fayzulla Alimov; Nodirbek Muminov; Javokhirbek Nurmatov; Meyirkhan Timurov
7	Saudi Arabia (KSA); Faisal Hazem Abed; Jawad Al-Dawood; Ahmed Al-Hussain; Khalifah Al-Omairi
8	Vietnam (VIE); Hoàng Nhật Nam; Nguyễn Phước Đến; Nguyễn Tiến Nhật
9	Philippines (PHI); Miguel Bautista; Noelito Jose; Sammuel Tranquilan
10	Thailand (THA); Chinnaphat Chaloemchanen; Korakote Juengamnuaychai; Jadsadaporn Puengkuntod; Nattiphong Singkham
11	Kyrgyzstan (KGZ); Ilim Bakytbek Uulu; Zhoodat Esenaliev; Akmal Moidunov; Roman Petrov
12	Kuwait (KUW); Abdulrahman Al-Mane; Ali Al-Nakkas; Abdulaziz Al-Shatti
13	United Arab Emirates (UAE); Omran Al-Bloushi; Abdulla Al-Hammadi; Mohamed Al-Maazmi; Khalifa Al-Zarooni
14	Mongolia (MGL); Boldbaataryn Byambajargal; Tsoggereliin Jigjidsüren; Batchuluuny Khash-Erdene; Uyangyn Margad-Erdene
