= Fencing at the 2026 Asian Games – Men's team épée =

Men's team épée at the 2026 Asian Games
- Venue: Aichi Sky Expo Hall F
- Date: 27 September 2026
- Competitors: 68 from 18 nations

Medalists
gold medal	Kazakhstan; Ruslan Kurbanov, Kirill Prokhodov, Yerlik Sertay, Vadim Sharlaimov
silver medal	South Korea; Jang Hyo-min, Kwon O-min, Nam Yeon-ho, Park Sang-young
bronze medal	Hong Kong; Fong Hoi Sun, Ho Wai Hang, Lau Ho Fung, Ng Ho Tin
bronze medal	Japan; Seiya Asami, Koki Kano, Ryu Matsumoto, Masaru Yamada

The men's team épée competition at the 2026 Asian Games in Nagoya was held on 27 September 2026 at the Aichi Sky Expo Hall F. Kazakhstan, led by Ruslan Kurbanov and Kirill Prokhodov, defeated South Korea 43–42 in a thrilling final that went down to the final touch, winning the gold medal. Hong Kong, China and Japan shared the bronze medals.

== Schedule ==
All times are Japan Standard Time (UTC+09:00)

Date	Time	Event
Sunday, 27 September 2026	9:30	Table of 32
Sunday, 27 September 2026	10:50	Table of 16
Sunday, 27 September 2026	12:50	Quarterfinals
Sunday, 27 September 2026	15:20	Semifinals
Sunday, 27 September 2026	18:40	Gold medal match

== Seeding ==
The teams were seeded taking into account the results achieved by competitors representing each team in the individual event.

Rank	Team	Fencer		Total
Rank	Team	1	2	Total
1	Japan (JPN)	1	3	4
2	Kazakhstan (KAZ)	2	9	11
3	Hong Kong (HKG)	3	8	11
4	China (CHN)	5	6	11
5	South Korea (KOR)	7	11	18
6	Chinese Taipei (TPE)	13	16	29
7	Singapore (SGP)	10	22	32
8	Saudi Arabia (KSA)	14	18	32
9	Vietnam (VIE)	15	19	34
10	Philippines (PHI)	12	31	43
11	Kyrgyzstan (KGZ)	17	26	43
12	Uzbekistan (UZB)	21	24	45
13	Mongolia (MGL)	20	29	49
14	United Arab Emirates (UAE)	25	27	52
15	Qatar (QAT)	28	32	60
16	Bangladesh (BAN)	34	36	70
17	Oman (OMA)	33	41	74
18	Pakistan (PAK)	38	39	77

== Results ==
Table of 32
17	Oman	45
16	Bangladesh	26
15	Qatar	7
18	Pakistan	5

Table of 16
1	Japan	45
17	Oman	24
9	Vietnam	45
8	Saudi Arabia	39
5	South Korea	45
12	Uzbekistan	33
13	Mongolia	19
4	China	45
3	Hong Kong	45
14	United Arab Emirates	36
11	Kyrgyzstan	40
6	Chinese Taipei	45
7	Singapore	45
10	Philippines	30
15	Qatar	27
2	Kazakhstan	45

Quarterfinals
1	Japan	45
9	Vietnam	29
5	South Korea	45
4	China	36
3	Hong Kong	45
6	Chinese Taipei	40
7	Singapore	36
2	Kazakhstan	45

Semifinals
1	Japan	37
5	South Korea	38
3	Hong Kong	34
2	Kazakhstan	45

Gold medal match
5	South Korea	42
2	Kazakhstan	43

== Final standing ==
Rank	Team
1st place, gold medalist(s)	Kazakhstan (KAZ); Ruslan Kurbanov; Kirill Prokhodov; Yerlik Sertay; Vadim Sharlaimov
2nd place, silver medalist(s)	South Korea (KOR); Jang Hyo-min; Kwon O-min; Nam Yeon-ho; Park Sang-young
3rd place, bronze medalist(s)	Hong Kong (HKG); Fong Hoi Sun; Ho Wai Hang; Lau Ho Fung; Ng Ho Tin
3rd place, bronze medalist(s)	Japan (JPN); Seiya Asami; Koki Kano; Ryu Matsumoto; Masaru Yamada
5	China (CHN); Lan Minghao; Peng Shengwei; Xiu Yuhan; Zhang Xinkun
6	Chinese Taipei (TPE); Hsu Ching-wen; Lee Rang; Yilu Gaston Guillemot; Wu Chun-ming
7	Singapore (SGP); Si To Jian Tong; Simon Renjie Lee; Puah Zee Cher; Ong Azfar Luqman
8	Vietnam (VIE); Hoàng Nhật Nam; Nguyễn Tiến Nhật; Nguyễn Phước Đến; Nguyễn Minh Hiếu
9	Saudi Arabia (KSA); Khalifah Al-Omairi; Jawad Al-Dawood; Ahmed Hazazi; Hassan Hazem Abed
10	Philippines (PHI); Nathaniel Perez; Noelito Jose; Miguel Bautista; Sammuel Tranquilan
11	Kyrgyzstan (KGZ); Roman Petrov; Ilim Bakytbek Uulu; Rustam Islamov
12	Uzbekistan (UZB); Vadim Anokhin; Javokhirbek Nurmatov; Meyirkhan Timurov
13	Mongolia (MGL); Ankhbayar Khosbayar; Munkhkhasar Ulaankhuu; Gandul Batbyamba
14	United Arab Emirates (UAE); Mohamed Al-Aazmi; Khalifa Al-Zarooni; Hamdan Saif; Salha Alblooshi
15	Qatar (QAT); Abdulrahman Aljadra; Ali Alkhlif; Muhammad Abdulali; Youssef Abdeltawab
16	Oman (OMA); Ammar Al Azizi; Saeed Al Shuaibi; Al Harith Al Harthi; Ahmed Keskes
17	Bangladesh (BAN); Md Imtiaj; Mahady Hasan; Md Hasan Ali
18	Pakistan (PAK); Baryal Khan; Muhammad Waqas; Muhammad Yaseen Khan; Abdul Musawir
