= Fencing at the 2022 Asian Games – Men's individual épée =

Men's individual épée at the 2022 Asian Games
- Venue: Hangzhou Dianzi University Gymnasium
- Date: 26 September 2023
- Competitors: 32 from 18 nations

Medalists
gold medal	Koki Kano	Japan
silver medal	Akira Komata	Japan
bronze medal	Ho Wai Hang	Hong Kong
bronze medal	Elmir Alimzhanov	Kazakhstan

The men's individual épée competition at the 2022 Asian Games in Hangzhou was held on 26 September 2023 at the Hangzhou Dianzi University Gymnasium.

== Schedule ==
All times are China Standard Time (UTC+08:00)

Date	Time	Event
Tuesday, 26 September 2023	12:30	Round of pools
Tuesday, 26 September 2023	14:20	Table of 32
Tuesday, 26 September 2023	15:40	Table of 16
Tuesday, 26 September 2023	16:40	Quarterfinals
Tuesday, 26 September 2023	19:15	Semifinals
Tuesday, 26 September 2023	20:45	Gold medal bout

== Results ==
=== Round of pools ===
==== Pool 1 ====
Athlete	JPN	UZB	HKG	UAE	JOR	PAK	MGL
Koki Kano (JPN)	—	5–3	2–3	4–2	2–5	5–1	5–1
Fayzulla Alimov (UZB)	3–5	—	2–3	5–2	5–2	5–2	5–0
Ng Ho Tin (HKG)	3–2	3–2	—	5–3	5–0	5–1	4–2
Mohamed Al-Maazmi (UAE)	2–4	2–5	3–5	—	4–5	5–0	5–2
Iyad Odeh (JOR)	5–2	2–5	0–5	5–4	—	5–2	4–5
Mujaded Awan (PAK)	1–5	2–5	1–5	0–5	2–5	—	1–5
Batchuluuny Khash-Erdene (MGL)	1–5	0–5	2–4	2–5	5–4	5–1	—

==== Pool 2 ====
Athlete	KAZ	HKG	UZB	KGZ	THA	IRQ	MGL
Ruslan Kurbanov (KAZ)	—	5–4	5–1	5–3	5–0	4–2	3–1
Ho Wai Hang (HKG)	4–5	—	5–3	5–1	5–2	5–3	5–1
Javokhirbek Nurmatov (UZB)	1–5	3–5	—	5–4	3–2	4–5	5–2
Ilim Bakytbek Uulu (KGZ)	3–5	1–5	4–5	—	2–3	5–2	5–3
Chinnaphat Chaloemchanen (THA)	0–5	2–5	2–3	3–2	—	5–2	5–4
Abbas Abdul-Wahid (IRQ)	2–4	3–5	5–4	2–5	2–5	—	5–2
Tsoggereliin Jigjidsüren (MGL)	1–3	1–5	2–5	3–5	4–5	2–5	—

==== Pool 3 ====
Athlete	JPN	KOR	PHI	VIE	KGZ	UAE
Akira Komata (JPN)	—	2–5	5–2	4–5	5–3	4–5
Kweon Young-jun (KOR)	5–2	—	5–3	5–2	3–5	5–4
Noelito Jose (PHI)	2–5	3–5	—	2–5	5–3	5–3
Nguyễn Phước Đến (VIE)	5–4	2–5	5–2	—	3–5	5–4
Roman Petrov (KGZ)	3–5	5–3	3–5	5–3	—	5–3
Khalifa Al-Zarooni (UAE)	5–4	4–5	3–5	4–5	3–5	—

==== Pool 4 ====
Athlete	CHN	KAZ	KSA	KUW	THA	INA
Yu Lefan (CHN)	—	1–4	3–5	5–3	5–1	5–1
Elmir Alimzhanov (KAZ)	4–1	—	4–3	5–4	5–4	5–1
Khalifah Al-Omairi (KSA)	5–3	3–4	—	5–2	5–3	5–2
Abdulaziz Al-Shatti (KUW)	3–5	4–5	2–5	—	4–5	5–3
Nattiphong Singkham (THA)	1–5	4–5	3–5	5–4	—	5–2
Arval Raziel Ridwan Sundara (INA)	1–5	1–5	2–5	3–5	2–5	—

==== Pool 5 ====
Athlete	CHN	KOR	KUW	VIE	KSA	MGL
Wang Zijie (CHN)	—	3–5	5–0	5–3	5–1	5–1
Kim Jae-won (KOR)	5–3	—	3–5	5–3	5–3	5–3
Abdulrahman Al-Mane (KUW)	0–5	5–3	—	4–5	5–2	4–5
Nguyễn Tiến Nhật (VIE)	3–5	3–5	5–4	—	3–5	1–5
Ahmed Al-Hussain (KSA)	1–5	3–5	2–5	5–3	—	5–4
Miguel Bautista (PHI)	1–5	3–5	5–4	5–1	4–5	—

==== Summary ====
Rank	Pool	Athlete	W	L	W/M	TD	TF
1	2	Ruslan Kurbanov (KAZ)	6	0	1.000	+16	27
2	1	Ng Ho Tin (HKG)	6	0	1.000	+15	25
3	4	Elmir Alimzhanov (KAZ)	5	0	1.000	+10	23
4	2	Ho Wai Hang (HKG)	5	1	0.833	+14	29
5	5	Wang Zijie (CHN)	4	1	0.800	+13	23
6	4	Khalifah Al-Omairi (KSA)	4	1	0.800	+9	23
7	3	Kweon Young-jun (KOR)	4	1	0.800	+7	23
8	5	Kim Jae-won (KOR)	4	1	0.800	+6	23
9	1	Fayzulla Alimov (UZB)	4	2	0.667	+11	25
10	1	Koki Kano (JPN)	4	2	0.667	+8	23
11	4	Yu Lefan (CHN)	3	2	0.600	+5	19
12	3	Roman Petrov (KGZ)	3	2	0.600	+2	21
13	3	Nguyễn Phước Đến (VIE)	3	2	0.600	0	20
14	2	Javokhirbek Nurmatov (UZB)	3	3	0.500	–2	21
14	1	Iyad Odeh (JOR)	3	3	0.500	–2	21
16	2	Chinnaphat Chaloemchanen (THA)	3	3	0.500	–4	17
17	3	Akira Komata (JPN)	2	3	0.400	0	20
18	5	Abdulrahman Al-Mane (KUW)	2	3	0.400	–2	18
18	5	Miguel Bautista (PHI)	2	3	0.400	−2	18
20	4	Nattiphong Singkham (THA)	2	3	0.400	−3	18
21	3	Noelito Jose (PHI)	2	3	0.400	−4	17
22	5	Ahmed Al-Hussain (KSA)	2	3	0.400	−6	16
23	1	Mohamed Al-Maazmi (UAE)	2	4	0.333	0	21
24	2	Ilim Bakytbek Uulu (KGZ)	2	4	0.333	−3	20
25	2	Abbas Abdul-Wahid (IRQ)	2	4	0.333	−6	19
26	1	Batchuluuny Khash-Erdene (MGL)	2	4	0.333	−9	15
27	3	Khalifa Al-Zarooni (UAE)	1	4	0.200	−5	19
28	4	Abdulaziz Al-Shatti (KUW)	1	4	0.200	−5	18
29	5	Nguyễn Tiến Nhật (VIE)	1	4	0.200	−9	15
30	2	Tsoggereliin Jigjidsüren (MGL)	0	6	0.000	−15	13
31	4	Arval Raziel Ridwan Sundara (INA)	0	5	0.000	−16	9
32	1	Mujaded Awan (PAK)	0	6	0.000	−23	7

=== Knockout round ===
==== Final ====
Gold medal bout
17	Akira Komata (JPN)	7
10	Koki Kano (JPN)	15

==== Top half ====
Table of 32
17	Akira Komata (JPN)	15
16	Chinnaphat Chaloemchanen (THA)	8
9	Fayzulla Alimov (UZB)	15
24	Ilim Bakytbek Uulu (KGZ)	8
25	Abbas Abdul-Wahid (IRQ)	14
8	Kim Jae-won (KOR)	15
21	Noelito Jose (PHI)	15
12	Roman Petrov (KGZ)	13
13	Nguyễn Phước Đến (VIE)	15
20	Nattiphong Singkham (THA)	10

Table of 16
1	Ruslan Kurbanov (KAZ)	14
17	Akira Komata (JPN)	15
9	Fayzulla Alimov (UZB)	11
8	Kim Jae-won (KOR)	12
5	Wang Zijie (CHN)	12
21	Noelito Jose (PHI)	15
13	Nguyễn Phước Đến (VIE)	12
4	Ho Wai Hang (HKG)	15

Quarterfinals
17	Akira Komata (JPN)	15
8	Kim Jae-won (KOR)	11
21	Noelito Jose (PHI)	10
4	Ho Wai Hang (HKG)	15

Semifinals
17	Akira Komata (JPN)	15
4	Ho Wai Hang (HKG)	12

==== Bottom half ====
Table of 32
19	Miguel Bautista (PHI)	13
14	Javokhirbek Nurmatov (UZB)	15
11	Yu Lefan (CHN)	15
22	Ahmed Al-Hussain (KSA)	4
23	Mohamed Al-Maazmi (UAE)	7
10	Koki Kano (JPN)	15
15	Iyad Odeh (JOR)	15
18	Abdulrahman Al-Mane (KUW)	14

Table of 16
3	Elmir Alimzhanov (KAZ)	13
14	Javokhirbek Nurmatov (UZB)	8
11	Yu Lefan (CHN)	15
6	Khalifah Al-Omairi (KSA)	8
7	Kweon Young-jun (KOR)	11
10	Koki Kano (JPN)	12
15	Iyad Odeh (JOR)	12
2	Ng Ho Tin (HKG)	15

Quarterfinals
3	Elmir Alimzhanov (KAZ)	15
11	Yu Lefan (CHN)	12
10	Koki Kano (JPN)	14
2	Ng Ho Tin (HKG)	9

Semifinals
3	Elmir Alimzhanov (KAZ)	9
10	Koki Kano (JPN)	15

== Final standing ==
Rank	Athlete
1st place, gold medalist(s)	Koki Kano (JPN)
2nd place, silver medalist(s)	Akira Komata (JPN)
3rd place, bronze medalist(s)	Ho Wai Hang (HKG)
3rd place, bronze medalist(s)	Elmir Alimzhanov (KAZ)
5	Ng Ho Tin (HKG)
6	Kim Jae-won (KOR)
7	Yu Lefan (CHN)
8	Noelito Jose (PHI)
9	Ruslan Kurbanov (KAZ)
10	Wang Zijie (CHN)
11	Khalifah Al-Omairi (KSA)
12	Kweon Young-jun (KOR)
13	Fayzulla Alimov (UZB)
14	Nguyễn Phước Đến (VIE)
15	Iyad Odeh (JOR)
15	Javokhirbek Nurmatov (UZB)
17	Roman Petrov (KGZ)
18	Chinnaphat Chaloemchanen (THA)
19	Abdulrahman Al-Mane (KUW)
19	Miguel Bautista (PHI)
21	Nattiphong Singkham (THA)
22	Ahmed Al-Hussain (KSA)
23	Mohamed Al-Maazmi (UAE)
24	Ilim Bakytbek Uulu (KGZ)
25	Abbas Abdul-Wahid (IRQ)
26	Batchuluuny Khash-Erdene (MGL)
27	Khalifa Al-Zarooni (UAE)
28	Abdulaziz Al-Shatti (KUW)
29	Nguyễn Tiến Nhật (VIE)
30	Tsoggereliin Jigjidsüren (MGL)
31	Arval Raziel Ridwan Sundara (INA)
32	Mujaded Awan (PAK)
