= Men's épée at the 2025 World Fencing Championships =

- Venue: Olympic Palace
- Location: Tbilisi, Georgia
- Dates: 26 July (preliminaries); 27 July (finals)
- Competitors: 64 from 34 nations

Medalists
gold medal	Koki Kano	Japan
silver medal	Gergely Siklósi	Hungary
bronze medal	Masaru Yamada	Japan
bronze medal	Nikita Koshman	Ukraine

The Men's épée competition at the 2025 World Fencing Championships was held on 26 and 27 July 2025.

== Draw ==
=== Finals ===
Semifinals
(Japan) Koki Kano	15
(Japan) Masaru Yamada	8
(Hungary) Gergely Siklósi	15
(Ukraine) Nikita Koshman	9

Final
(Japan) Koki Kano	10
(Hungary) Gergely Siklósi	9

=== Top half ===
==== Section 1 ====
Round of 64
(Japan) Koki Kano	15
(Czech Republic) Michal Čupr	12
(Poland) Wojciech Lubieniecki	12
(Spain) Yulen Pereira	15
(China) Wang Zijie	15
(United States) Oleg Knysh	13
(Austria) Josef Mahringer	13
(France) Alexandre Bardenet	15
(Venezuela) Rubén Limardo	12
(United States Virgin Islands) Kruz Schembri	15
(Japan) Ryu Matsumoto	15
(Italy) Valerio Cuomo	14
(Uzbekistan) Javokhirbek Nurmatov	15
(Canada) Xiao Ruibo	11
(Morocco) Houssam El-Kord	10
(Japan) Akira Komata	15

Round of 32
(Japan) Koki Kano	15
(Spain) Yulen Pereira	7
(China) Wang Zijie	15
(France) Alexandre Bardenet	14
(United States Virgin Islands) Kruz Schembri	10
(Japan) Ryu Matsumoto	15
(Uzbekistan) Javokhirbek Nurmatov	6
(Japan) Akira Komata	14

Round of 16
(Japan) Koki Kano	15
(China) Wang Zijie	11
(Japan) Ryu Matsumoto	11
(Japan) Akira Komata	15

Quarterfinals
(Japan) Koki Kano	15
(Japan) Akira Komata	11

==== Section 2 ====
Round of 64
(Kazakhstan) Ruslan Kurbanov	15
(South Korea) Park Sang-young	10
(Ukraine) Roman Svichkar	15
(Finland) Akseli Heinämaa	10
(France) Paul Allegre	9
(Mexico) Pablo Florido	15
Mark Semanenka	15
(Switzerland) Ian Hauri	11
(United States) Samuel Imrek	15
(India) Sherjin Rajendran	6
(Poland) Damian Michalak	15
(Switzerland) Lucas Malcotti	9
(Portugal) Filipe Frazão	15
(Germany) Matthew Bülau	12
(Estonia) Filipp Djatsuk	14
(Japan) Masaru Yamada	15

Round of 32
(Kazakhstan) Ruslan Kurbanov	10
(Ukraine) Roman Svichkar	9
(Mexico) Pablo Florido	7
Mark Semanenka	15
(United States) Samuel Imrek	15
(Poland) Damian Michalak	8
(Portugal) Filipe Frazão	11
(Japan) Masaru Yamada	15

Round of 16
(Kazakhstan) Ruslan Kurbanov	13
Mark Semanenka	14
(United States) Samuel Imrek	13
(Japan) Masaru Yamada	14

Quarterfinals
Mark Semanenka	14
(Japan) Masaru Yamada	15

=== Bottom half ===
==== Section 3 ====
Round of 64
(Hungary) Gergely Siklósi	13
(Czech Republic) Matyáš Pavlík	12
(Israel) Yuval Freilich	7
(Hungary) Dávid Nagy	8
(Egypt) Mahmoud El-Sayed	15
(China) Zhang Xinkun	13
(Denmark) Conrad Kongstad	15
(Hungary) Máté Tamás Koch	10
(Czech Republic) Jakub Jurka	15
(Uzbekistan) Vadim Anokhin	14
(Canada) Fynn Fafard	15
Dmitriy Gusev	11
(Luxembourg) Flavio Giannotte
(Denmark) Patrick Jørgensen	w/o
(Switzerland) Hadrien Favre	11
(Italy) Davide Di Veroli	13

Round of 32
(Hungary) Gergely Siklósi	9
(Hungary) Dávid Nagy	8
(Egypt) Mahmoud El-Sayed	15
(Denmark) Conrad Kongstad	11
(Czech Republic) Jakub Jurka	15
(Canada) Fynn Fafard	14
(Denmark) Patrick Jørgensen	6
(Italy) Davide Di Veroli	15

Round of 16
(Hungary) Gergely Siklósi	15
(Egypt) Mahmoud El-Sayed	10
(Czech Republic) Jakub Jurka	11
(Italy) Davide Di Veroli	15

Quarterfinals
(Hungary) Gergely Siklósi	12
(Italy) Davide Di Veroli	11

==== Section 4 ====
Round of 64
(Belgium) Neisser Loyola	15
(South Korea) Ma Se-geon	8
(Kazakhstan) Vadim Sharlaimov	15
(Croatia) Vedran Markota	13
(Italy) Matteo Galassi	15
(Czech Republic) Martin Rubeš	9
(Bulgaria) Rahim Rashaida	13
(Hungary) Tibor Andrásfi	14
(Italy) Andrea Santarelli	9
(Netherlands) Tristan Tulen	15
(Netherlands) Rafael Tulen	14
(France) Luidgi Midelton	13
(Estonia) Kasper Tafenau	14
(Ukraine) Nikita Koshman	15
(Estonia) Sten Priints	10
(Egypt) Mohamed El-Sayed	15

Round of 32
(Belgium) Neisser Loyola	15
(Kazakhstan) Vadim Sharlaimov	8
(Italy) Matteo Galassi	15
(Hungary) Tibor Andrásfi	14
(Netherlands) Tristan Tulen	15
(Netherlands) Rafael Tulen	7
(Ukraine) Nikita Koshman	14
(Egypt) Mohamed El-Sayed	11

Round of 16
(Belgium) Neisser Loyola	8
(Italy) Matteo Galassi	15
(Netherlands) Tristan Tulen	12
(Ukraine) Nikita Koshman	15

Quarterfinals
(Italy) Matteo Galassi	13
(Ukraine) Nikita Koshman	15
