= 2019 Asian Fencing Championships =

Fencing Championship Chiba, Japan

- Host city: Chiba, Japan
- Dates: 13–18 June 2019
- Main venue: Chiba Port Arena

The 2019 Asian Fencing Championships was held in Chiba, Japan from 13 to 18 June 2019 at the Chiba Port Arena.

== Medal summary ==
=== Men ===
Event	Gold	Silver	Bronze
Individual épée	Masaru Yamada; Japan	Satoru Uyama; Japan	Nguyễn Tiến Nhật; Vietnam
Individual épée	Masaru Yamada; Japan	Satoru Uyama; Japan	Ruslan Kurbanov; Kazakhstan
Team épée	China; Dong Chao; Lan Minghao; Shi Gaofeng; Wang Zijie	South Korea; An Sung-ho; Kweon Young-jun; Na Jong-kwan; Park Sang-young	Japan; Koki Kano; Kazuyasu Minobe; Satoru Uyama; Masaru Yamada
Team épée	China; Dong Chao; Lan Minghao; Shi Gaofeng; Wang Zijie	South Korea; An Sung-ho; Kweon Young-jun; Na Jong-kwan; Park Sang-young	Kazakhstan; Elmir Alimzhanov; Ivan Deryabin; Ruslan Kurbanov; Vadim Sharlaimov
Individual foil	Takahiro Shikine; Japan	Cheung Ka Long; Hong Kong	Chen Haiwei; China
Individual foil	Takahiro Shikine; Japan	Cheung Ka Long; Hong Kong	Toshiya Saito; Japan
Team foil	Japan; Kyosuke Matsuyama; Ryo Miyake; Takahiro Shikine; Kenta Suzumura	China; Chen Haiwei; Huang Mengkai; Ma Jianfei; Wu Bin	Hong Kong; Cheung Ka Long; Cheung Siu Lun; Ryan Choi; Yeung Chi Ka
Team foil	Japan; Kyosuke Matsuyama; Ryo Miyake; Takahiro Shikine; Kenta Suzumura	China; Chen Haiwei; Huang Mengkai; Ma Jianfei; Wu Bin	South Korea; Heo Jun; Kim Dong-su; Lee Kwang-hyun; Son Young-ki
Individual sabre	Oh Sang-uk; South Korea	Wang Shi; China	Mojtaba Abedini; Iran
Individual sabre	Oh Sang-uk; South Korea	Wang Shi; China	Ha Han-sol; South Korea
Team sabre	South Korea; Gu Bon-gil; Ha Han-sol; Kim Jun-ho; Oh Sang-uk	Iran; Mojtaba Abedini; Mohammad Fotouhi; Ali Pakdaman; Mohammad Rahbari	Japan; Tomohiro Shimamura; Kaito Streets; Kenta Tokunan; Kento Yoshida
Team sabre	South Korea; Gu Bon-gil; Ha Han-sol; Kim Jun-ho; Oh Sang-uk	Iran; Mojtaba Abedini; Mohammad Fotouhi; Ali Pakdaman; Mohammad Rahbari	China; Deng Xiaohao; Wang Shi; Xu Yingming; Yan Yinghui

=== Women ===
Event	Gold	Silver	Bronze
Individual épée	Zhu Mingye; China	Lin Sheng; China	Choi In-jeong; South Korea
Individual épée	Zhu Mingye; China	Lin Sheng; China	Kang Young-mi; South Korea
Team épée	South Korea; Choi In-jeong; Jung Hyo-jung; Kang Young-mi; Lee Hye-in	China; Lin Sheng; Sun Yiwen; Xu Chengzi; Zhu Mingye	Hong Kong; Chu Ka Mong; Kaylin Hsieh; Vivian Kong; Coco Lin
Team épée	South Korea; Choi In-jeong; Jung Hyo-jung; Kang Young-mi; Lee Hye-in	China; Lin Sheng; Sun Yiwen; Xu Chengzi; Zhu Mingye	Japan; Haruna Baba; Kanna Oishi; Nozomi Sato; Miho Yoshimura
Individual foil	Jeon Hee-sook; South Korea	Yuka Ueno; Japan	Chen Qingyuan; China
Individual foil	Jeon Hee-sook; South Korea	Yuka Ueno; Japan	Sera Azuma; Japan
Team foil	Japan; Sera Azuma; Komaki Kikuchi; Sumire Tsuji; Yuka Ueno	South Korea; Chae Song-oh; Hong Hyo-jin; Hong Seo-in; Jeon Hee-sook	China; Chen Qingyuan; Huo Xingxin; Shi Yue; Wu Peilin
Team foil	Japan; Sera Azuma; Komaki Kikuchi; Sumire Tsuji; Yuka Ueno	South Korea; Chae Song-oh; Hong Hyo-jin; Hong Seo-in; Jeon Hee-sook	Hong Kong; Valerie Cheng; Kimberley Cheung; Liu Yan Wai; Sophia Wu
Individual sabre	Yoon Ji-su; South Korea	Norika Tamura; Japan	Kim Ji-yeon; South Korea
Individual sabre	Yoon Ji-su; South Korea	Norika Tamura; Japan	Shihomi Fukushima; Japan
Team sabre	China; Fu Ying; Qian Jiarui; Shao Yaqi; Yang Hengyu	South Korea; Choi Soo-yeon; Hwang Seon-a; Kim Ji-yeon; Yoon Ji-su	Japan; Chika Aoki; Misaki Emura; Shihomi Fukushima; Norika Tamura
Team sabre	China; Fu Ying; Qian Jiarui; Shao Yaqi; Yang Hengyu	South Korea; Choi Soo-yeon; Hwang Seon-a; Kim Ji-yeon; Yoon Ji-su	Kazakhstan; Aibike Khabibullina; Tamara Pochekutova; Tatyana Prikhodko; Aigerim Sarybay

== Medal table ==
Rank	Nation	Gold	Silver	Bronze	Total
1	South Korea	5	3	5	13
2	Japan	4	3	7	14
3	China	3	4	4	11
4	Hong Kong	0	1	3	4
5	Iran	0	1	1	2
6	Kazakhstan	0	0	3	3
7	Vietnam	0	0	1	1
Totals (7 entries)		12	12	24	48

== Results ==
=== Men ===
==== Individual épée ====
Quarterfinals		Semifinals		Final
Masaru Yamada (JPN)	15
Dmitriy Alexanin (KAZ)	13	Masaru Yamada (JPN)	15
Ho Wai Hang (HKG)	12	Nguyễn Tiến Nhật (VIE)	11
Nguyễn Tiến Nhật (VIE)	15			Masaru Yamada (JPN)	15
Ruslan Kurbanov (KAZ)	15			Satoru Uyama (JPN)	13
Lan Minghao (CHN)	12	Ruslan Kurbanov (KAZ)	11
Satoru Uyama (JPN)	15	Satoru Uyama (JPN)	15
Wang Zijie (CHN)	11

==== Team épée ====
Quarterfinals
South Korea	45
Australia	37
Uzbekistan	30
Kazakhstan	45
China	45
Hong Kong	39
Vietnam	34
Japan	45

Semifinals
South Korea	44
Kazakhstan	43
China	45
Japan	41

Final
South Korea	41
China	45
3rd place
Kazakhstan	23
Japan	45

==== Individual foil ====
Quarterfinals		Semifinals		Final
Chen Haiwei (CHN)	15
Lee Kwang-hyun (KOR)	5	Chen Haiwei (CHN)	5
Cheung Ka Long (HKG)	15	Cheung Ka Long (HKG)	15
Son Young-ki (KOR)	8			Cheung Ka Long (HKG)	13
Toshiya Saito (JPN)	15			Takahiro Shikine (JPN)	15
Ryan Choi (HKG)	11	Toshiya Saito (JPN)	13
Kim Dong-su (KOR)	11	Takahiro Shikine (JPN)	15
Takahiro Shikine (JPN)	15

==== Team foil ====
Quarterfinals
South Korea	45
Singapore	28
Chinese Taipei	26
China	45
Japan	45
Australia	22
Kuwait	18
Hong Kong	45

Semifinals
South Korea	33
China	45
Japan	45
Hong Kong	36

Final
China	43
Japan	45
3rd place
South Korea	42
Hong Kong	45

==== Individual sabre ====
Quarterfinals		Semifinals		Final
Mojtaba Abedini (IRI)	15
Gu Bon-gil (KOR)	12	Mojtaba Abedini (IRI)	10
Mohammad Fotouhi (IRI)	12	Wang Shi (CHN)	15
Wang Shi (CHN)	15			Wang Shi (CHN)	10
Ali Pakdaman (IRI)	14			Oh Sang-uk (KOR)	15
Ha Han-sol (KOR)	15	Ha Han-sol (KOR)	12
Vũ Thành An (VIE)	7	Oh Sang-uk (KOR)	15
Oh Sang-uk (KOR)	15

==== Team sabre ====
Quarterfinals
South Korea	45
Vietnam	30
Kuwait	30
Japan	45
China	45
Hong Kong	24
Thailand	39
Iran	45

Semifinals
South Korea	45
Japan	37
China	34
Iran	45

Final
South Korea	45
Iran	42
3rd place
Japan	45
China	39

=== Women ===
==== Individual épée ====
Quarterfinals		Semifinals		Final
Jung Hyo-jung (KOR)	13
Choi In-jeong (KOR)	15	Choi In-jeong (KOR)	12
Miho Yoshimura (JPN)	10	Zhu Mingye (CHN)	15
Zhu Mingye (CHN)	15			Zhu Mingye (CHN)	9
Lin Sheng (CHN)	9			Lin Sheng (CHN)	8
Sun Yiwen (CHN)	8	Lin Sheng (CHN)	15
Nozomi Sato (JPN)	8	Kang Young-mi (KOR)	11
Kang Young-mi (KOR)	15

==== Team épée ====
Quarterfinals
China	35
Thailand	18
Chinese Taipei	28
Japan	45
Hong Kong	45
Kazakhstan	26
Iran	29
South Korea	45

Semifinals
China	45
Japan	35
Hong Kong	31
South Korea	45

Final
China	30
South Korea	45
3rd place
Japan	39
Hong Kong	45

==== Individual foil ====
Quarterfinals		Semifinals		Final
Kimberley Cheung (HKG)	9
Chen Qingyuan (CHN)	15	Chen Qingyuan (CHN)	11
Sumire Tsuji (JPN)	8	Yuka Ueno (JPN)	15
Yuka Ueno (JPN)	14			Yuka Ueno (JPN)	7
Komaki Kikuchi (JPN)	6			Jeon Hee-sook (KOR)	9
Sera Azuma (JPN)	15	Sera Azuma (JPN)	12
Jeon Hee-sook (KOR)	15	Jeon Hee-sook (KOR)	13
Fu Yiting (CHN)	8

==== Team foil ====
Quarterfinals
South Korea	45
Vietnam	37
Singapore	41
Hong Kong	42
China	39
Chinese Taipei	20
Philippines	23
Japan	45

Semifinals
South Korea	34
Hong Kong	33
China	23
Japan	30

Final
South Korea	29
Japan	45
3rd place
Hong Kong	30
China	44

==== Individual sabre ====
Quarterfinals		Semifinals		Final
Qian Jiarui (CHN)	13
Kim Ji-yeon (KOR)	15	Kim Ji-yeon (KOR)	14
Yoon Ji-su (KOR)	15	Yoon Ji-su (KOR)	15
Hwang Seon-a (KOR)	11			Yoon Ji-su (KOR)	15
Shihomi Fukushima (JPN)	15			Norika Tamura (JPN)	10
Misaki Emura (JPN)	8	Shihomi Fukushima (JPN)	10
Norika Tamura (JPN)	15	Norika Tamura (JPN)	15
Yang Hengyu (CHN)	13

==== Team sabre ====
Quarterfinals
South Korea	45
Thailand	23
Kazakhstan	45
Hong Kong	44
Japan	45
Iran	32
Singapore	24
China	45

Semifinals
South Korea	45
Kazakhstan	15
Japan	34
China	45

Final
South Korea	38
China	45
3rd place
Kazakhstan	35
Japan	45
