= Fencing at the 2018 Asian Games – Men's team épée =

Men's team épée at the 2018 Asian Games
- Venue: Jakarta Convention Center
- Date: 22 August 2018
- Competitors: 54 from 14 nations

Medalists
gold medal	Japan; Koki Kano, Kazuyasu Minobe, Satoru Uyama, Masaru Yamada
silver medal	China; Dong Chao, Lan Minghao, Shi Gaofeng, Xue Yangdong
bronze medal	South Korea; Jung Jin-sun, Kweon Young-jun, Park Kyoung-doo, Park Sang-young
bronze medal	Kazakhstan; Dmitriy Alexanin, Elmir Alimzhanov, Ruslan Kurbanov, Vadim Sharlaimov

The men's team épée competition at the 2018 Asian Games in Jakarta was held on 22 August at the Jakarta Convention Center.

== Schedule ==
All times are Western Indonesia Time (UTC+07:00)

Date	Time	Event
Wednesday, 22 August 2018	09:30	Round of 16
Wednesday, 22 August 2018	11:00	Quarterfinals
Wednesday, 22 August 2018	12:30	Semifinals
Wednesday, 22 August 2018	18:30	Gold medal match

== Seeding ==
The teams were seeded taking into account the results achieved by competitors representing each team in the individual event.

Rank	Team	Fencer		Total
Rank	Team	1	2	Total
1	South Korea (KOR)	2	3	5
2	Kazakhstan (KAZ)	1	7	8
3	Japan (JPN)	3	6	9
4	China (CHN)	5	10	15
5	Vietnam (VIE)	8	14	22
6	Uzbekistan (UZB)	9	15	24
7	Hong Kong (HKG)	11	17	28
8	Kyrgyzstan (KGZ)	13	16	29
9	Iran (IRI)	18	21	39
10	Qatar (QAT)	19	30	49
11	Indonesia (INA)	23	26	49
12	Thailand (THA)	25	27	52
13	Mongolia (MGL)	24	29	53
14	Pakistan (PAK)	31	32	63

== Results ==
Round of 16
9	Iran	45
8	Kyrgyzstan	44
5	Vietnam	45
12	Thailand	40
13	Mongolia	24
4	China	45
3	Japan	45
14	Pakistan	19
11	Indonesia	35
6	Uzbekistan	45
7	Hong Kong	45
10	Qatar	31

Quarterfinals
1	South Korea	45
9	Iran	26
5	Vietnam	31
4	China	45
3	Japan	45
6	Uzbekistan	38
7	Hong Kong	33
2	Kazakhstan	45

Semifinals
1	South Korea	41
4	China	45
3	Japan	45
2	Kazakhstan	36

Gold medal match
4	China	22
3	Japan	30

== Final standing ==
Rank	Team
1st place, gold medalist(s)	Japan (JPN); Koki Kano; Kazuyasu Minobe; Satoru Uyama; Masaru Yamada
2nd place, silver medalist(s)	China (CHN); Dong Chao; Lan Minghao; Shi Gaofeng; Xue Yangdong
3rd place, bronze medalist(s)	South Korea (KOR); Jung Jin-sun; Kweon Young-jun; Park Kyoung-doo; Park Sang-young
3rd place, bronze medalist(s)	Kazakhstan (KAZ); Dmitriy Alexanin; Elmir Alimzhanov; Ruslan Kurbanov; Vadim Sharlaimov
5	Vietnam (VIE); Đặng Tuấn Anh; Nguyễn Phước Đến; Nguyễn Tiến Nhật; Trần Út Ngọc
6	Uzbekistan (UZB); Roman Aleksandrov; Fayzulla Alimov; Javokhirbek Nurmatov; Oleg Sokolov
7	Hong Kong (HKG); Fong Hoi Sun; Ho Wai Hang; Clarence Lai; Ng Ho Tin
8	Iran (IRI); Mojtaba Abedini; Mohammad Esmaeili; Amir Reza Kanaani; Mohammad Rezaei
9	Kyrgyzstan (KGZ); Kubatbek Abdrakhman Uulu; Khasan Baudunov; Roman Petrov; Daanyshman Zhumabai Uulu
10	Qatar (QAT); Mohammed Al-Dosari; Mohammed Al-Shamari; Mohammed Mirzaei
11	Indonesia (INA); Muhammad Fajri; Ryan Pratama; Derry Renanda Putra Siahaan; Iqbal Tawakal
12	Thailand (THA); Chinnaphat Chaloemchanen; Thanwa Chantharapidok; Korakote Juengamnuaychai
13	Mongolia (MGL); Altangereliin Bat-Erdene; Bayarsaikhany Batkhüü; Enkhtsogtyn Dölgöön; Erdenebatyn Bat-Erdene
14	Pakistan (PAK); Mujaded Awan; Nazar Abbas Bhatti; Muhammad Zaheer Mushtaq; Ali Saeeduddin
