= Masaru Yamada =

Japanese fencer (born 1994)

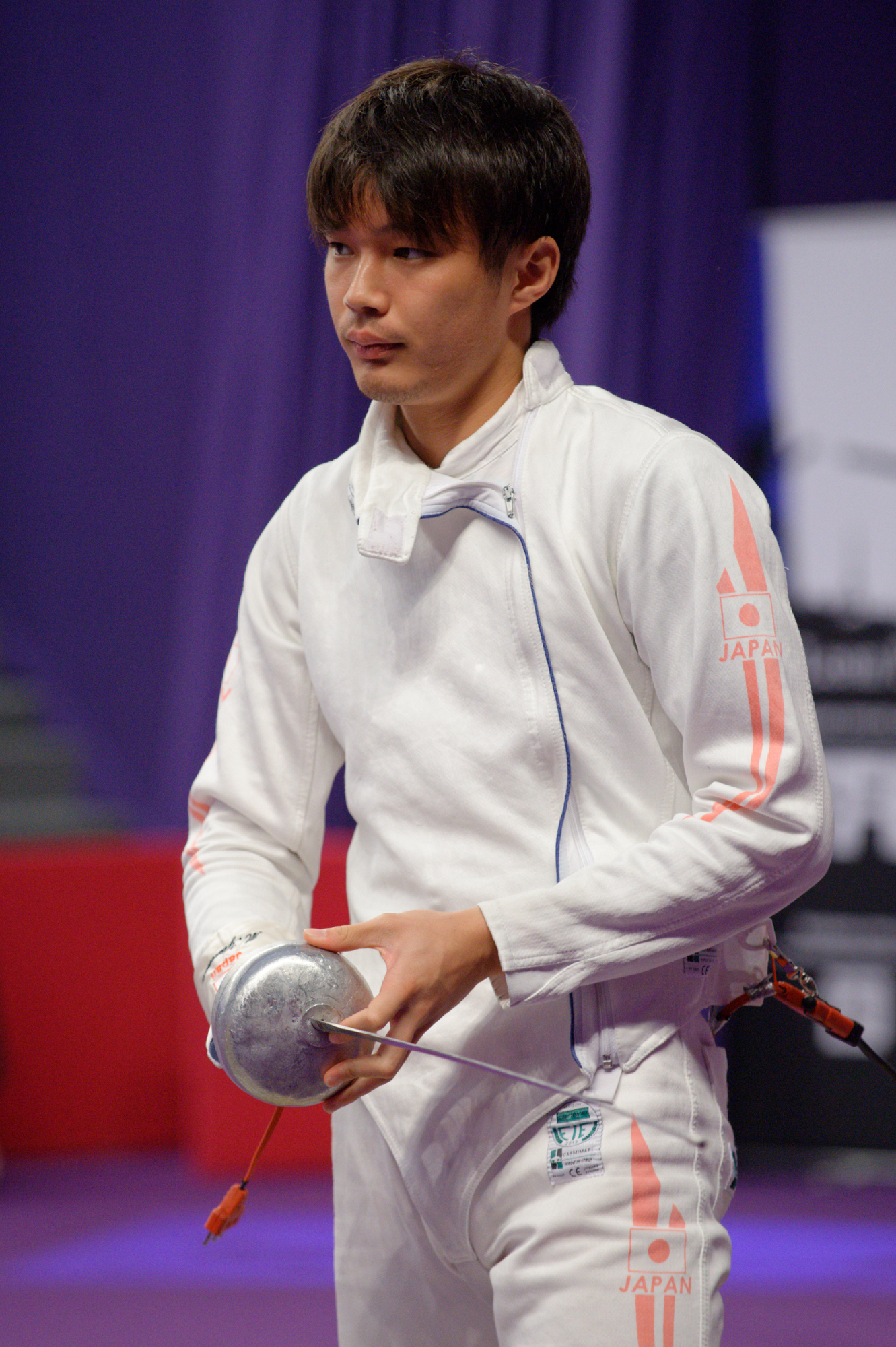
- Yamada in 2015

Personal information
- Born: June 14, 1994 (age 32) Toba, Japan

Fencing career
- Sport: Fencing
- Country: Japan
- Weapon: Épée
- Hand: Right-handed
Medal record
Men's épée
Representing Japan
Olympic Games
Gold medal – first place	2020 Tokyo	Team
Silver medal – second place	2024 Paris	Team
World Championships
Gold medal – first place	2025 Tbilisi	Team
Bronze medal – third place	2022 Cairo	Team
Bronze medal – third place	2025 Tbilisi	Individual
Bronze medal – third place	2026 Hong Kong	Individual
Asian Games
Gold medal – first place	2018 Jakarta-Palembang	Team
Gold medal – first place	2022 Hangzhou	Team
Silver medal – second place	2014 Incheon	Team
Bronze medal – third place	2026 Aichi–Nagoya	Individual
Bronze medal – third place	2026 Aichi–Nagoya	Team
Asian Championships
Gold medal – first place	2016 Wuxi	Team
Gold medal – first place	2019 Chiba	Individual
Silver medal – second place	2024 Kuwait City	Team
Bronze medal – third place	2014 Suwon	Team
Bronze medal – third place	2015 Singapore	Team
Bronze medal – third place	2017 Hong Kong	Team
Bronze medal – third place	2019 Chiba	Team
Summer Universiade
Bronze medal – third place	2017 Taipei	Individual

Masaru Yamada (山田優, Yamada Masaru, born 14 June 1994) is a Japanese right-handed épée fencer, 2016 team Asian champion, 2019 individual Asian champion, and 2021 team Olympic champion.

Along with Koki Kano, Kazuyasu Minobe, and Satoru Uyama, Yamada was a member of the Japanese team that won gold in the team men's épée event at the 2020 Tokyo Olympic Games. It was Japan's first team Olympic gold medal in fencing.

== Medal record ==
=== Olympic Games ===
Year	Location	Event	Position
2021	Tokyo, Japan	Team Men's Épée	1st
2024	Paris, France	Team Men's Épée	2nd

=== World Championship ===
Year	Location	Event	Position
2022	Cairo, Egypt	Team Men's Épée	3rd

=== Asian Championship ===
Year	Location	Event	Position
2014	Suwon, South Korea	Team Men's Épée	3rd
2015	Singapore	Team Men's Épée	3rd
2016	Wuxi, China	Team Men's Épée	1st
2017	Hong Kong, China	Team Men's Épée	3rd
2019	Tokyo, Japan	Individual Men's Épée	1st
2022	Seoul, South Korea	Team Men's Épée	3rd

=== Grand Prix ===
Date	Location	Event	Position
2020-01-24	Doha, Qatar	Individual Men's Épée	3rd
2020-03-06	Budapest, Hungary	Individual Men's Épée	1st

=== World Cup ===
Year	Location	Event	Position
2024-05-17	Saint-Maur-des-Fossés, France	Individual Men's Épée	2nd
2024-02-22	Heidenheim an der Brenz, Germany	Individual Men's Épée	1st
2023-11-10	Bern, Switzerland	Individual Men's Épée	3rd
