= Satoru Uyama =

Japanese fencer (born 1991)

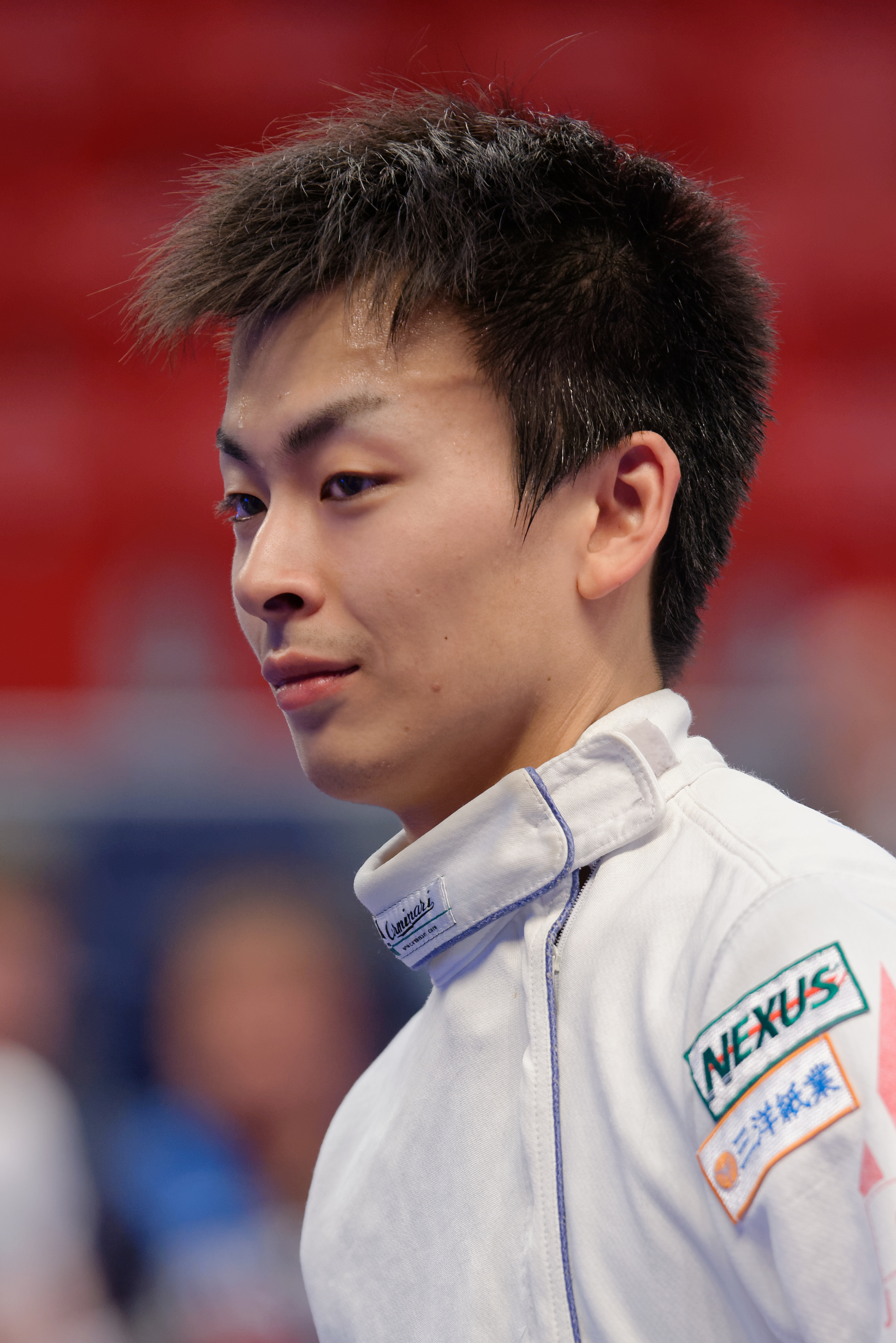
- Satoru Uyama in 2016

Personal information
- Born: December 10, 1991 (age 34) Takamatsu, Japan

Fencing career
- Sport: Fencing
- Country: Japan
- Weapon: Épée
- Hand: Right-handed
Medal record
Men's fencing
Representing Japan
Olympic Games
Gold medal – first place	2020 Tokyo	Team épée
Asian Games
Gold medal – first place	2018 Jakarta-Palembang	team
Asian Championships
Silver medal – second place	2019 Chiba	Individual
Bronze medal – third place	2019 Chiba	Team

Satoru Uyama (宇山 賢, Uyama Satoru, born 10 December 1991) is a Japanese right-handed épée fencer, 2016 team Asian champion, and 2021 team Olympic champion.

Along with Koki Kano, Masaru Yamada, and Kazuyasu Minobe, Uyama was a member of the Japanese team that won gold in the team men's épée event at the 2020 Tokyo Olympic Games. It was Japan's first Olympic gold medal in fencing.

== Medal Record ==
=== Olympic Games ===
Year	Location	Event	Position
2021	Tokyo, Japan	Team Men's Épée	1st

=== Asian Championship ===
Year	Location	Event	Position
2014	Suwon, South Korea	Team Men's Épée	3rd
2015	Singapore	Team Men's Épée	3rd
2016	Wuxi, China	Team Men's Épée	1st
2017	Hong Kong, China	Team Men's Épée	3rd
2019	Tokyo, Japan	Individual Men's Épée	2nd
2019	Tokyo, Japan	Team Men's Épée	3rd

=== World Cup ===
Date	Location	Event	Position
11/13/2015	Tallinn, Estonia	Individual Men's Épée	2nd
10/28/2016	Bern, Switzerland	Individual Men's Épée	2nd
