= Men's team épée at the 2025 World Fencing Championships =

- Venue: Olympic Palace
- Location: Tbilisi, Georgia
- Dates: 29 July (preliminaries); 30 July (finals)
- Competitors: 181 from 47 nations
- Teams: 47

Medalists
gold medal	Seiya Asami; Koki Kano; Akira Komata; Masaru Yamada	Japan
silver medal	Tibor Andrásfi; Zsombor Keszthelyi; Máté Tamás Koch; Gergely Siklósi	Hungary
bronze medal	Ruslan Kurbanov; Elmir Alimzhanov; Kirill Prokhodov; Vadim Sharlaimov	Kazakhstan

The Men's team épée competition at the 2025 World Fencing Championships was held on 29 and 30 July 2025.

== Draw ==
=== Finals ===
Semifinals
Japan	42
Kazakhstan	41
France	35
Hungary	45

Final
Japan	45
Hungary	35
Third place
Kazakhstan	45
France	31

=== Top half ===
==== Section 1 ====
Round of 64
Panama	45
India	42
Qatar	23
Estonia	45
Saudi Arabia	45
New Zealand	27

Round of 32
Japan	45
Panama	17
South Korea	45
Poland	40
Switzerland	45
Estonia	44
Saudi Arabia	18
Egypt	45

Round of 16
Japan	45
South Korea	31
Switzerland	42
Egypt	40

Quarterfinals
Japan	45
Switzerland	40

==== Section 2 ====
Round of 64
Individual Neutral Athletes	45
Finland	33
Spain	45
Latvia	39
Iran	36
Germany	45
Sweden	45
Turkmenistan	22

Round of 32
Kazakhstan	45
Individual Neutral Athletes	35
Spain	32
China	45
Netherlands	42
Germany	38
Sweden	43
Italy	45

Round of 16
Kazakhstan	38
China	37
Netherlands	35
Italy	45

Quarterfinals
Kazakhstan	45
Italy	43

=== Bottom half ===
==== Section 3 ====
Round of 64
Mexico	34
Great Britain	45
Colombia	45
Moldova	17
Georgia	32
Uzbekistan	45
Denmark	45
Kuwait	28

Round of 32
France	45
Great Britain	31
Colombia	28
United States	45
Ukraine	27
Uzbekistan	26
Denmark	40
Czech Republic	39

Round of 16
France	45
United States	43
Ukraine	37
Denmark	45

Quarterfinals
France	45
Denmark	39

==== Section 4 ====
Round of 64
United Arab Emirates	40
South Africa	45
Brazil	31
Croatia	30
Portugal	23
Canada	29
Angola	w/o
Singapore

Round of 32
Venezuela	45
South Africa	38
Brazil	29
Israel	45
Hong Kong	31
Canada	29
Angola
Hungary	w/o

Round of 16
Venezuela	29
Israel	28
Hong Kong	27
Hungary	42

Quarterfinals
Venezuela	24
Hungary	45

=== Placement rounds ===
==== 5–8th place bracket ====
5–8th place semifinals
Switzerland	30
Italy	45
Denmark	33
Venezuela	30

Fifth place
Italy	45
Denmark	28
Seventh place
Switzerland	45
Venezuela	33

==== 9–16th place bracket ====
9–16th place quarterfinals
South Korea	37
Egypt	40
China	23
Netherlands	28
United States	38
Ukraine	45
Israel	45
Hong Kong	39

9–12th place semifinals
Egypt	37
Netherlands	36
Ukraine	42
Israel	40

Ninth place
Egypt	37
Ukraine	45
Eleventh place
Netherlands	38
Israel	45

==== 13–16th place bracket ====
13–16th place semifinals
South Korea	35
China	41
United States	45
Hong Kong	36

13th place
China	37
United States	45
15th place
South Korea	45
Hong Kong	36

== Final ranking ==
Rank	Team
1st place, gold medalist(s)	Japan
2nd place, silver medalist(s)	Hungary
3rd place, bronze medalist(s)	Kazakhstan
4	France
5	Italy
6	Denmark
7	Switzerland
8	Venezuela
9	Ukraine
10	Egypt
11	Israel
12	Netherlands
13	United States
14	China
15	South Korea
16	Hong Kong
17	Czech Republic
18	Poland
19	Canada
20	Colombia
21	Germany
22	Spain
23	Uzbekistan
24	Brazil
25	Estonia
26	Saudi Arabia
27	South Africa
28	Sweden
29	United Kingdom
30	Angola
31	Panama
32	Individual Neutral Athletes
33	Finland
34	India
35	Mexico
36	Turkmenistan
37	Kuwait
38	United Arab Emirates
39	New Zealand
40	Qatar
41	Croatia
42	Georgia
43	Latvia
44	Iran
45	Moldova
46	Portugal
