= 2027 D1 Grand Prix series =

27th season of D1 Grand Prix (D1GP)

2027 D1 Grand Prix series is a planned 27th season of D1 Grand Prix (D1GP) professional drifting competition based in Japan. The competition is organized by Sunpros under Japanese Automobile Federation (JAF) Semi national competition format and recognize as Japan Drift Championship. The championship is planned to be contested over 10 rounds starting at Aichi Sky Expo on 28 May and ended on 27 November 2026.

== Schedule ==
Provisional calendar was released on October 4, 2026 with both the opening and finale venue yet to be announced. Later on November 11, Aichi Sky Expo returned as season opening two round with the dates moved to late May while the season finale moved to late November with Odaiba expected to be announced on later date.

Round	Venue	Date
1	Aichi Sky Expo, Aichi Prefecture	28 May
2	Aichi Sky Expo, Aichi Prefecture	29 May
3	Tsukuba Circuit, Ibaraki Prefecture	26 June
4	Tsukuba Circuit, Ibaraki Prefecture	27 June
5	Ebisu Circuit, Fukushima Prefecture	25 September
6	Ebisu Circuit, Fukushima Prefecture	26 September
7	(Ōita Prefecture) Autopolis, Oita Prefecture	23 October
8	(Ōita Prefecture) Autopolis, Oita Prefecture	24 October
9	TBA	November 27
10	TBA	November 28

== Teams and Driver ==
Teams	Tire	Car	Engine	No	Drivers	Round	Ref.
SHIBATA RACING TEAM	Shibatire	Nissan Skyline (R31)	Nissan VR38 V6	31	(Japan) Koudai Sobagiri	TBA	
TEAM VERTEX	TBA	Toyota Soarer (Z30)	Toyota 2JZ I6	78	(Japan) Takahiro Ueno	1-2	
TBA	TBA	TBA	TBA	TBA	(Pakistan) Rohab Khan R	TBA	

R Eligible for Rookie of the year award

=== Changes ===
- Takahiro Ueno who will be entering his 200th round at the season opener, change his car to Toyota Soarer Z30, a car he is best known for. The decision is to celebrate his 200th and final run in the competition as he plan to retire at the end of the season.
- Toyo Tires announced the end of their works Team Toyo Tires Drift entry after 20 years in the series. The decision is taken following the company's medium-term management plan for 2030 and shift focus developing racing tires and compete at Nurburgring. The brand plan to remain in series as tire supplier and not completely withdrawn from competition.
- Pakistani driver, Rohab Khan will step up from D1 Lights. He finished the previous year D1 Lights season in 13th. He will be the first Pakistani driver to compete in D1GP.
- Shibata Racing Team will debut a 4.5 liter VR38 powered R31 Skyline as their R31HOUSE specialty shop for R31 Skyline is celebrating it's 31st anniversary.

== Round results ==
Round	Venue	Winner		Report
Round	Venue	Tanso	Tsuiso	Report
1	Aichi Sky Expo, Aichi Prefecture			
2	Aichi Sky Expo, Aichi Prefecture			
3	Tsukuba Circuit, Ibaraki Prefecture			
4	Tsukuba Circuit, Ibaraki Prefecture			
5	Ebisu Circuit, Fukushima Prefecture			
6	Ebisu Circuit, Fukushima Prefecture			
7	(Ōita Prefecture) Autopolis, Oita Prefecture			
8	(Ōita Prefecture) Autopolis, Oita Prefecture			
9	TBA			
10	TBA			
