= Fencing at the 2025 Islamic Solidarity Games =

Fencing competition

- Venue: Boulevard City
- Dates: 17—20 November 2025
- Competitors: 156 from 22 nations

The fencing tournament at the 2025 Islamic Solidarity Games in Riyadh was held between 17—20 November 2025. The fencing competition took place at Boulevard City in Saudi Arabia.

== Medal table ==
* Host nation (Saudi Arabia)

Rank	Nation	Gold	Silver	Bronze	Total
1	Turkey	5	2	2	9
2	Uzbekistan	3	6	3	12
3	Kazakhstan	1	1	0	2
4	Azerbaijan	1	0	3	4
4	Oman	1	0	3	4
4	Tunisia	1	0	3	4
7	Saudi Arabia*	0	1	3	4
8	Qatar	0	1	1	2
9	Bahrain	0	1	0	1
10	Indonesia	0	0	2	2
10	Iran	0	0	2	2
12	Cameroon	0	0	1	1
12	United Arab Emirates	0	0	1	1
Totals (13 entries)		12	12	24	48

== Medal summary ==
=== Men ===
Event	Gold	Silver	Bronze
Individual épée	Meyirkhan Timurov; Uzbekistan	Javokhirbek Nurmatov; Uzbekistan	Khalifah Al-Omairi; Saudi Arabia
Individual épée	Meyirkhan Timurov; Uzbekistan	Javokhirbek Nurmatov; Uzbekistan	Vahab Fatullayev; Azerbaijan
Team épée	Kazakhstan; Kirill Prokhodov; Yerlik Sertay; Vadim Sharlaimov	Saudi Arabia; Omar Al-Akkas; Jawad Al-Dawood; Khalifah Al-Omairi	Iran; Behnam Beik; Mohammad Esmaeili; Mohammad Ali Khakzar; Amir Hossein Movashahi
Team épée	Kazakhstan; Kirill Prokhodov; Yerlik Sertay; Vadim Sharlaimov	Saudi Arabia; Omar Al-Akkas; Jawad Al-Dawood; Khalifah Al-Omairi	Oman; Ali Al-Busaidi; Salim Al-Harthi; Saeed Al-Shuaibi; Ahmed Keskes
Individual foil	Kıvanç Kırtay; Turkey	Ilyas Molina; Uzbekistan	Radmir Semeneev; Uzbekistan
Individual foil	Kıvanç Kırtay; Turkey	Ilyas Molina; Uzbekistan	Khaled Hussein; Qatar
Team foil	Uzbekistan; Ilyas Molina; Radmir Semeneev; Ulugbek Usmanov	Qatar; Adham Eldeeb; Khaled Hussein; Abdalla Khalifa	United Arab Emirates; Faris Al-Blooshi; Omran Al-Bloushi; Khalifa Al-Kaabi; Khalifa Al-Zarooni
Team foil	Uzbekistan; Ilyas Molina; Radmir Semeneev; Ulugbek Usmanov	Qatar; Adham Eldeeb; Khaled Hussein; Abdalla Khalifa	Oman; Ali Al-Busaidi; Salim Al-Harthi; Saeed Al-Shuaibi; Ahmed Keskes
Individual sabre	Fares Ferjani; Tunisia	Furkan Yaman; Turkey	Ahmed Ferjani; Tunisia
Individual sabre	Fares Ferjani; Tunisia	Furkan Yaman; Turkey	Zukhriddin Kodirov; Uzbekistan
Team sabre	Turkey; Candeniz Berrak; Enes Talha Kalender; Furkan Yaman	Uzbekistan; Islambek Abdazov; Musa Aymuratov; Zukhriddin Kodirov	Tunisia; Fares Ferjani; Ahmed Ferjani; Amen Hemissi
Team sabre	Turkey; Candeniz Berrak; Enes Talha Kalender; Furkan Yaman	Uzbekistan; Islambek Abdazov; Musa Aymuratov; Zukhriddin Kodirov	Iran; Mohammad Fotouhi; Taha Kargarpour; Ali Pakdaman; Nima Zahedi

=== Women ===
Event	Gold	Silver	Bronze
Individual épée	Aleyna Ertürk; Turkey	Sevara Rakhimova; Uzbekistan	Shahzoda Egamberdieva; Uzbekistan
Individual épée	Aleyna Ertürk; Turkey	Sevara Rakhimova; Uzbekistan	Ceren Cebe; Turkey
Team épée	Uzbekistan; Sevara Rakhimova; Sanam Nazarova; Shahzoda Egamberdieva	Turkey; Zülal Can; Ceren Cebe; Aleyna Ertürk	Azerbaijan; Aynur Guliyeva; Khadija Hasanli; Nazila Rahimova
Team épée	Uzbekistan; Sevara Rakhimova; Sanam Nazarova; Shahzoda Egamberdieva	Turkey; Zülal Can; Ceren Cebe; Aleyna Ertürk	Saudi Arabia; Nada Abed; Dhay Al-Amiri; Fawzya Al-Khibiri
Individual foil	Alara Atmaca; Turkey	Sofiya Aktayeva; Kazakhstan	Yasmine Soussi; Tunisia
Individual foil	Alara Atmaca; Turkey	Sofiya Aktayeva; Kazakhstan	Israa Siyabi; Oman
Team foil	Oman; Salma Al-Dighaishi; Ghzal Al-Fulaiti; Jana Al-Sharji; Israa Al-Siyabi	Bahrain; Sumaya Al-Buainain; Ritej Araoud; Mariam Khan	Indonesia; Siti Putri Amalia; Jessyca Emilia; Putri Yanti
Team foil	Oman; Salma Al-Dighaishi; Ghzal Al-Fulaiti; Jana Al-Sharji; Israa Al-Siyabi	Bahrain; Sumaya Al-Buainain; Ritej Araoud; Mariam Khan	Saudi Arabia; Al-Jawhara Al-Marri; Lameed Al-Marri; Basma Al-Rashid
Individual sabre	Nisanur Erbil; Turkey	Gulistan Perdebaeva; Uzbekistan	Dorothée Essomba; Cameroon
Individual sabre	Nisanur Erbil; Turkey	Gulistan Perdebaeva; Uzbekistan	Palina Kaspiarovich; Azerbaijan
Team sabre	Azerbaijan; Zarifa Huseynova; Sabina Karimova; Palina Kaspiarovich	Uzbekistan; Zaynab Dayibekova; Fernanda Herrera; Gulistan Perdebaeva	Turkey; Nisanur Erbil; İrem Güner; Nil Güngör
Team sabre	Azerbaijan; Zarifa Huseynova; Sabina Karimova; Palina Kaspiarovich	Uzbekistan; Zaynab Dayibekova; Fernanda Herrera; Gulistan Perdebaeva	Indonesia; Alma Fauziah Ismail; Nazwa Salwa Nissa; Indah Nur Safarin

== Participating nations ==
A total of 156 athletes from 22 nations competed in fencing at the 2025 Islamic Solidarity Games:

1. Azerbaijan (15)
2. Bahrain (8)
3. Brunei (2)
4. Cameroon (2)
5. Guinea (1)
6. Indonesia (12)
7. Iran (7)
8. Jordan (3)
9. Kazakhstan (4)
10. Kuwait (6)
11. Kyrgyzstan (7)
12. Libya (3)
13. Niger (2)
14. Oman (8)
15. Pakistan (6)
16. Qatar (9)
17. Saudi Arabia (19)
18. Tunisia (6)
19. Turkey (12)
20. United Arab Emirates (8)
21. Uzbekistan (15)
22. Yemen (1)
