= Men's team épée at the 2026 World Fencing Championships =

- Venue: AsiaWorld–Expo
- Location: Hong Kong
- Dates: 29 July
- Competitors: 178 from 46 nations
- Teams: 46

Medalists
gold medal	Ruslan Kurbanov; Kirill Prokhodov; Yerlik Sertay; Vadim Sharlaimov	Kazakhstan
silver medal	Ievgen Makiienko; Nikita Koshman; Mykhailo Krasniuk; Roman Svichkar	Ukraine
bronze medal	Mohamed El-Sayed; Mahmoud El-Sayed; Mahmoud Mohsen; Youssef Shamel	Egypt

The Men's team épée competition at the 2026 World Fencing Championships was held on 29 July 2026.

== Draw ==
=== Finals ===
Semifinals
Egypt	32
Kazakhstan	41
Israel	44
Ukraine	45

Final
Kazakhstan	45
Ukraine	40
Third place
Egypt	39
Israel	38

=== Top half ===
==== Section 1 ====
Round of 64
Singapore	23
Estonia	45
Argentina	37
Spain	45
Colombia	31
Portugal	37

Round of 32
France	43
Estonia	31
Russia	45
Venezuela	37
Netherlands	29
Spain	36
Portugal	33
Egypt	44

Round of 16
France	41
Russia	45
Spain	35
Egypt	36

Quarterfinals
Russia	35
Egypt	45

==== Section 2 ====
Round of 64
India	35
Finland	45
Uzbekistan	45
New Zealand	31
Qatar	20
Czech Republic	45
Saudi Arabia	29
Great Britain	45

Round of 32
Kazakhstan	45
Finland	39
Uzbekistan	45
Hong Kong	30
Denmark	45
Czech Republic	40
Great Britain	45
Japan	44

Round of 16
Kazakhstan	28
Uzbekistan	27
Denmark	45
Great Britain	28

Quarterfinals
Kazakhstan	45
Denmark	36

=== Bottom half ===
==== Section 3 ====
Round of 64
Algeria	w/o
Ivory Coast
Germany	42
Croatia	34
Philippines	45
Canada	41
Brazil	45
Kyrgyzstan	39

Round of 32
Italy	45
Algeria	28
Germany	35
Israel	39
South Korea	45
Philippines	29
Brazil	19
Hungary	45

Round of 16
Italy	41
Israel	42
South Korea	28
Hungary	27

Quarterfinals
Israel	43
South Korea	32

==== Section 4 ====
Round of 64
Morocco	38
Sweden	45
Poland	45
Mexico	27
Austria	45
Australia	27

Round of 32
Ukraine	45
Sweden	35
Poland	45
United States	43
China	38
Chinese Taipei	22
Austria	32
Switzerland	45

Round of 16
Ukraine	41
Poland	40
China	35
Switzerland	45

Quarterfinals
Ukraine	39
Switzerland	37

=== Placement rounds ===
==== 5–8th place bracket ====
5–8th place semifinals
Russia	38
Denmark	39
South Korea	35
Switzerland	41

Fifth place
Denmark	37
Switzerland	38
Seventh place
Russia	44
South Korea	39

==== 9–16th place bracket ====
9–16th place quarterfinals
France	44
Spain	37
Uzbekistan	45
Great Britain	31
Italy	43
Hungary	45
Poland	45
China	42

9–12th place semifinals
France	45
Uzbekistan	41
Hungary	35
Poland	25

Ninth place
France	31
Hungary	30
Eleventh place
Uzbekistan	45
Poland	31

==== 13–16th place bracket ====
13–16th place semifinals
Spain	44
Great Britain	45
Italy	45
China	35

13th place
Great Britain	34
Italy	45
15th place
Spain	36
China	45

== Final ranking ==
Rank	Team
1st place, gold medalist(s)	Kazakhstan
2nd place, silver medalist(s)	Ukraine
3rd place, bronze medalist(s)	Egypt
4	Israel
5	Switzerland
6	Denmark
7	Russia
8	South Korea
9	France
10	Hungary
11	Uzbekistan
12	Poland
13	Italy
14	Great Britain
15	China
16	Spain
17	Japan
18	Netherlands
19	United States
20	Hong Kong
21	Venezuela
22	Chinese Taipei
23	Germany
24	Czech Republic
25	Sweden
26	Brazil
27	Finland
28	Australia
29	Estonia
30	Algeria
31	Portugal
32	Philippines
33	Canada
34	Colombia
35	Saudi Arabia
36	Singapore
37	Australia
38	India
39	Kyrgyzstan
40	Morocco
41	Argentina
42	Mexico
43	New Zealand
44	Qatar
45	Croatia
