= Sumire Tsuji =

Japanese fencer (born 1999)

Personal information
- Nationality: Japanese
- Born: 29 November 1999 (age 26)

Fencing career
- Sport: Fencing
- Weapon: Foil
Medal record
Women's foil
Representing Japan
World Championships
Bronze medal – third place	2026 Hong Kong	Team
Asian Games
Gold medal – first place	2018 Jakarta	Team
Gold medal – first place	2026 Aichi-Nagoya	Team
Asian Championships
Gold medal – first place	2019 Chiba	Team

Sumire Tsuji (Japanese: 辻 すみれ, born 29 November 1999) is a Japanese fencer. She represented Japan in the women's team foil event at the 2020 Summer Olympics.

Tsuji won a bronze medal in the individual foil at the 2019 Foil Fencing World Cup, a silver medal as part of the Japanese women's team foil team at the 2019 Junior World Fencing Championships., and a gold medal in the team foil at the 2019 Asian Fencing Championships.

== Biography ==
Tsuji is from Gifu. She began fencing in the third year of primary school and had practised ballet since the age of four. She has credited the flexibility developed through ballet with helping her avoid opponents' attacks. She attended Gifu Sogo Gakuen High School and graduated from Asahi University's Faculty of Law in March 2022.

She won the Japanese women's foil championship in 2019.

Tsuji was selected as the reserve for Japan's women's foil team at the 2020 Summer Olympics in Tokyo. The team finished sixth.

In November 2022, Tsuji defeated Yuka Ueno in the Japanese women's foil championship final to win her second national title.

At the 2025 Asian Fencing Championships in Bali, Indonesia, Tsuji won the silver medal in women's individual foil, losing 12–13 to Ueno in the final.

Tsuji won gold in women's team foil alongside Ueno, Kikuchi and Sera Azuma, at the 2026 Asian Games. Japan defeated South Korea 29–28 in the final.
