= Zülal Can =

Turkish fencer (born 2009)

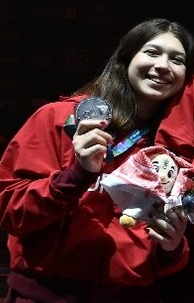

Personal information
- Born: 10 July 2009 (age 16) Meram, Konya, Turkey

Sport
- Sport: Fencing
- Event: Épée
Medal record
Women's fencing
Representing Turkey
Islamic Solidarity Games
Silver medal – second place	2025 Riyadh	team épée

Zülal Can (born 10 July 2009) is a Turkish fencer who competes in the épée event.

== Sport career ==
Can is a member of Konya Fencing Club.

She became champion in the épée U12 category at the 2021 Turkish Fencing Championships in Sakarya.

In 2023, she won the silver medal at the U14 European Circuit in Sofia, Bulgaria.

She placed third in the U17 category at the 2024 Turkish Championships.

At the 2025 Turkish Youth and Junior Fencing Cup in Konya, she finished the épée event in the U17 category as champion and in the U20 category as runners-up.

She competed at the 2025 Solidarity Games in Riyadh, Saudi Arabia, and won the silver medal in the team épée event.

== Personal life ==
Born on 10 July 2009, Zülal Can is a native of Meram, Konya, Turkey.

She is a student at Meram Anatolian High School in her hometown.
