= Ceren Cebe =

Turkish fencer (born 2006)

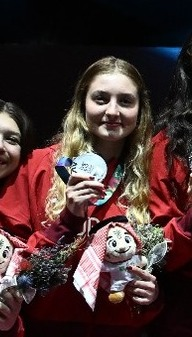

Personal information
- Born: 9 June 2006 (age 20) İzmir, Turkey

Sport
- Sport: Fencing
- Event: Épée
- Team: Alfa Eskrim S.K.
Medal record
Women's fencing
Representing Turkey
Islamic Solidarity Games
| Silver medal – second place | 2025 Riyadh | team épée |
| Bronze medal – third place | 2025 Riyadh | individual épée |

Ceren Cebe (born 9 June 2006) is a Turkish fencer who competes in the épée event.

== Sport career ==
Cebe started her fencing career in her hometown İzmir around 2015. She is a member of the 2019-established Alfa Fencing Club,. in Konak, İzmir, where she is coached by Emir Şendut.

She competed in the cadet category at the 2023 European Cadets and Juniors Fencing Championships in Tallinn, Estonia without gaining a medal.

In September 2023, she took the silver medal in the épée event at the Turkish Senior Fencing Championships in Ankara.

At the Bahrain Épée Men's & Women's Junior World Cup 2025 in Manama, she won the gold medal in the team event.

She took the silver medal in the team épée event at the 2024 FIE Women's Junior Épée World Cup in Tashkent, Uzbekistan. ...

She competed at the 2025 Solidarity Games in Riyadh, Saudi Arabia, and won the bronze medal in the individual épée event, and the silver medal in the team event.

== Personal life ==
Born on 9 June 2006, Ceren Cebe is a native of İzmir, Turkey.
