= Kirill Prokhodov =

Kazakhstani fencer (born 2007)

Personal information
- Born: 17 January 2007 (age 19)

Fencing career
- Sport: Fencing
- Country: Kazakhstan
- Weapon: Épée
- Hand: Right-handed
Medal record
Men's épée
Representing Kazakhstan
World Championships
Gold medal – first place	2026 Hong Kong	Team
Bronze medal – third place	2025 Tbilisi	Team
Asian Games
Gold medal – first place	2026 Aichi–Nagoya	Team
Silver medal – second place	2026 Aichi–Nagoya	Individual
Islamic Solidarity Games
Gold medal – first place	2025 Riyadh	Team

Kirill Prokhodov (born 17 January 2007) is a Kazakhstani right-handed épée fencer. He won Kazakhstan's first gold medal at the World Fencing Championships.

== Career ==
In July 2025, Prokhodov competed at the 2025 World Fencing Championships and won a bronze medal in the team épée event. This marked Kazakhstan's first-ever World Fencing Championships medal in the event. In November 2025, he then competed at the 2025 Islamic Solidarity Games and won a gold medal in the team épée event.

In July 2026, he competed at the 2026 World Fencing Championships and won a gold medal in the team épée event. This marked Kazakhstan's first gold medal at the World Fencing Championships.
