= Hoàng Nhật Nam =

Vietnamese footballer (born 1990)

Personal information
- Full name: Hoàng Nhật Nam
- Date of birth: April 3, 1990 (age 36)
- Place of birth: Thái Thụy, Thái Bình, Vietnam
- Height: 1.65 m (5 ft 5 in)
- Position: Attacking midfielder

Youth career
- 2007–2010: Nam Định

Senior career*
Years	Team	Apps	(Gls)
2010–2016	Nam Định	36	(14)
2016–2017	Ho Chi Minh City	18	(6)
2017–2019	Sanna Khánh Hòa BVN	48	(2)
2020–2021	Phú Thọ	1	(0)

International career
2006–2007	Vietnam U17	16	(3)
2008–2009	Vietnam U22	12	(4)
2010–2013	Vietnam U23	20	(0)
- * Club domestic league appearances and goals as of 9 February 2020

Hoàng Nhật Nam (born 3 April 1990) is a Vietnamese footballer who played as an attacking midfielder for Sanna Khánh Hòa BVN. He is the twin brother of Hoàng Danh Ngọc, with whom he was teammate at Nam Dinh.

== Club career ==
=== Ho Chi Minh City ===
Nam signed with Ho Chi Minh City in January 2016.
