= Yerlik Sertay =

Kazakh fencer (born 1998)

Personal information
- Born: 19 September 1998 (age 28)

Fencing career
- Sport: Fencing
- Country: Kazakhstan
- Weapon: Épée
- Hand: Right-handed
Medal record
Men's épée
Representing Kazakhstan
World Championships
Gold medal – first place	2026 Hong Kong	Team
Asian Games
Gold medal – first place	2026 Aichi–Nagoya	Team
Silver medal – second place	2022 Hangzhou	Team
Asian Championships
Gold medal – first place	2024 Kuwait City	Team
Silver medal – second place	2023 Wuxi	Team
Bronze medal – third place	2024 Kuwait City	Individual
Islamic Solidarity Games
Gold medal – first place	2025 Riyadh	Team

Yerlik Sertay (Kazakh: Ерлік Сертай; born 19 September 1998) is a Kazakh right-handed épée fencer. He represented Kazakhstan at the 2024 Summer Olympics. He won Kazakhstan's first gold medal at the 2026 World Fencing Championships.

== Career ==
In June 2024, Sertay competed at the 2024 Asian Fencing Championships and won a gold medal in the team épée event and a bronze medal in the individual épée event. He then represented Kazakhstan at the 2024 Summer Olympics and finished in sixth place in the team épée event.

In November 2025, he competed at the 2025 Islamic Solidarity Games and won a gold medal in the team épée event.

In July 2026, he competed at the 2026 World Fencing Championships in the team épée event and helped Kazakhstan advance to the finals for the first time in World Fencing Championships history. During the final Kazakhstan defeated Ukraine to win Kazakhstan's first gold medal at the World Fencing Championships.
