= Aichi International Exhibition Center =

Exhibition center in Aichi Prefecture, Japan

- 愛知県国際展示場
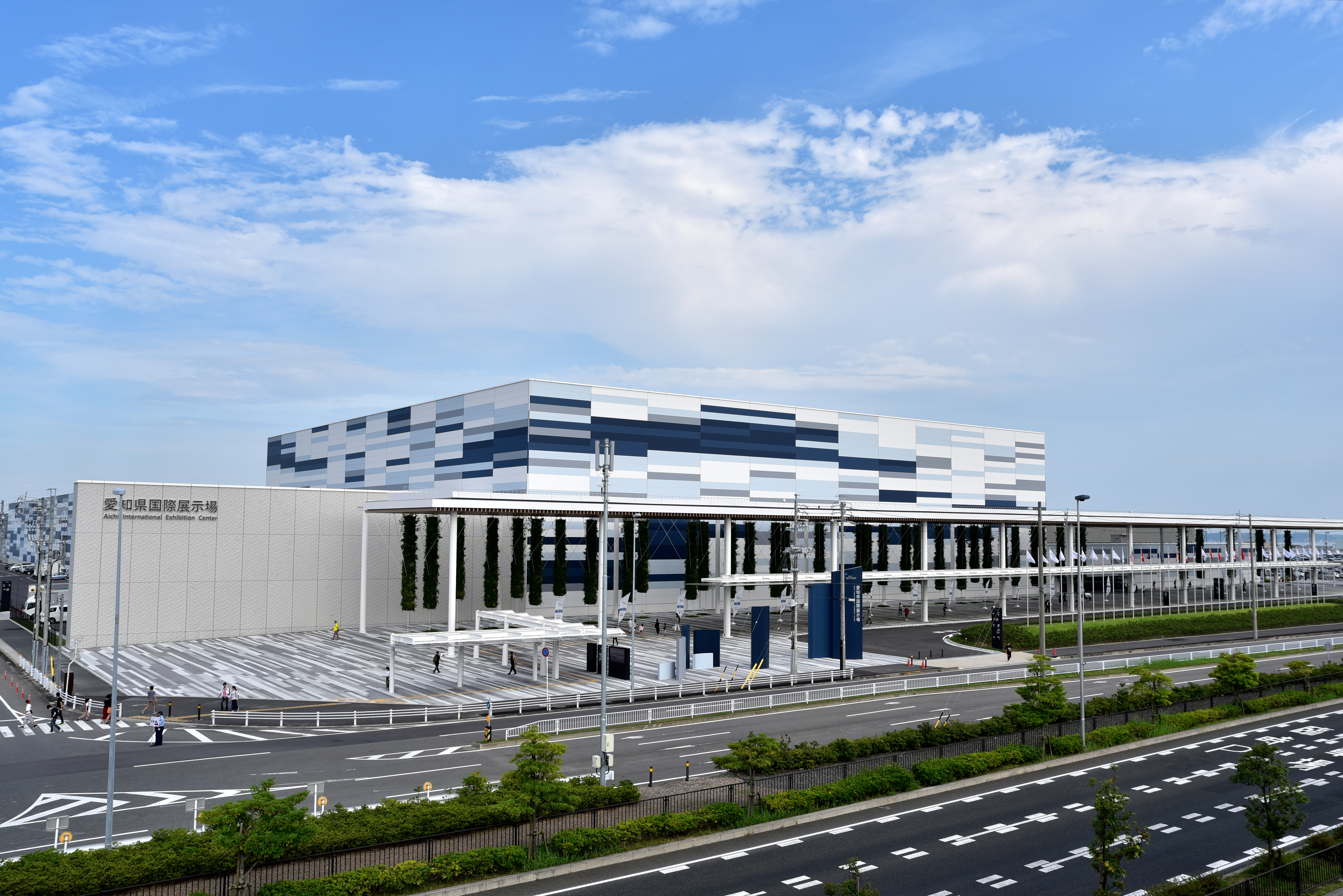
- Interactive map of Aichi International Exhibition Center
- Address: 5-10-1 Centrair, Tokoname City, Aichi, Japan
- Location: Tokoname, Aichi, Japan
- Coordinates: 34.857083°N 136.821389°E
- Owner: Aichi Prefecture
- Operator: Aichi International Exhibition Center Corporation
- Public transit: Meitetsu Centrair Station

Construction
- Built: June 2019
- Opened: August 2019
- Cost: 35 billion JPY

Tenant
- 2026 Asian Games

Website
- aichiskyexpo.com

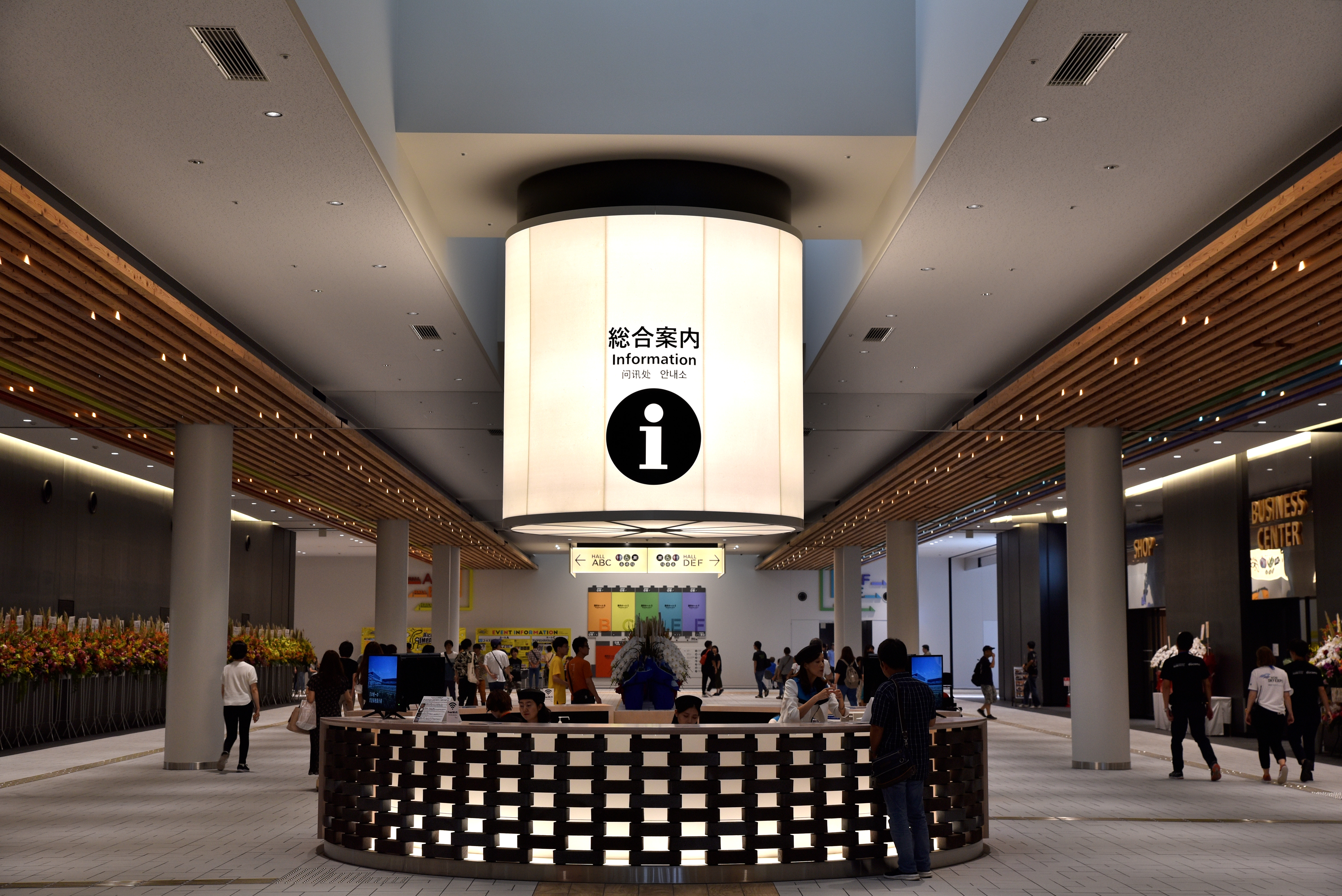
General guide.

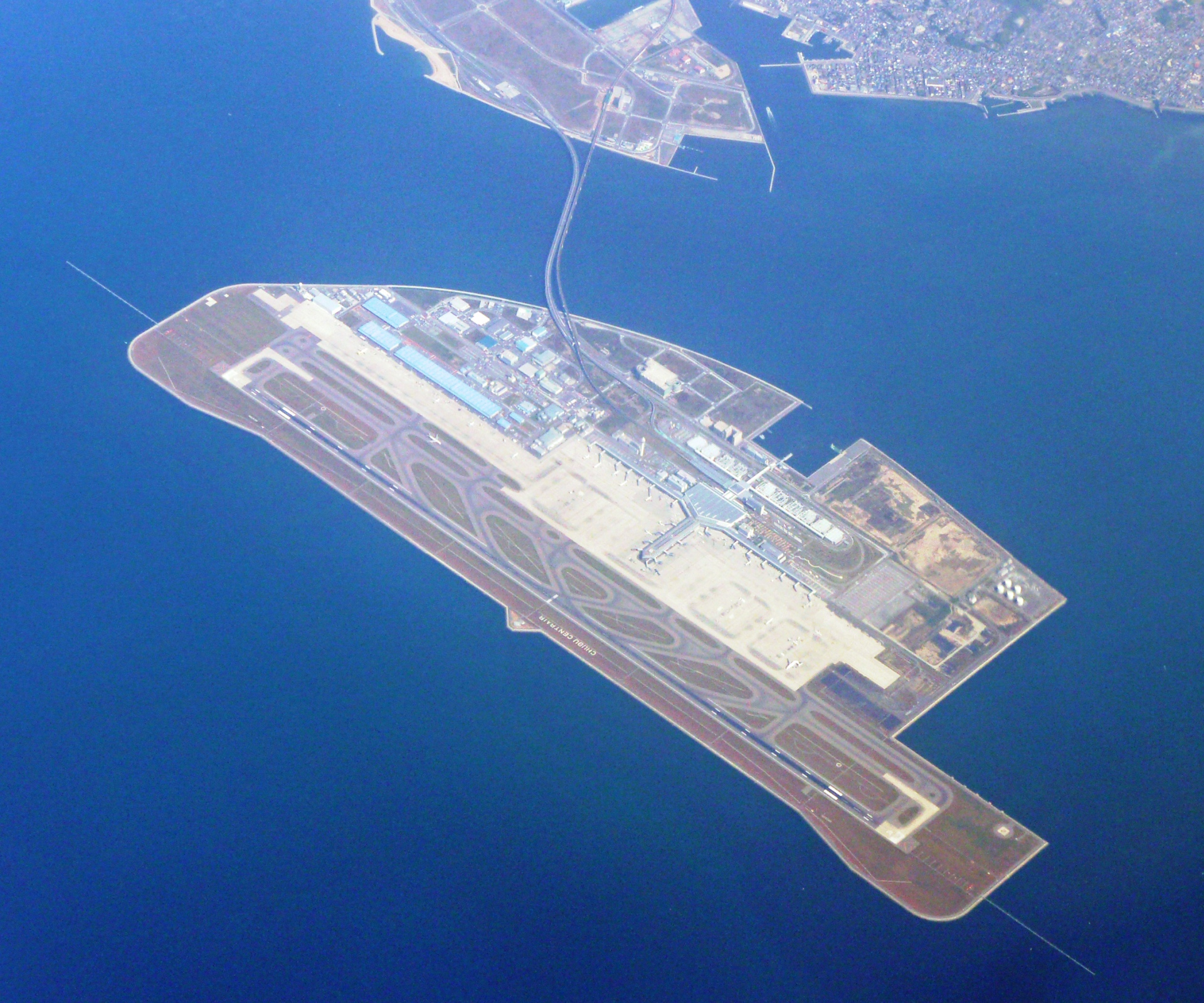
Chubu Centrair International Airport aerial view. The exhibition hall was built on unused land in the center right.

Aichi International Exhibition Center (愛知県国際展示場, Aichi ken kokusai tenji-ba), commonly known as Aichi Sky Expo, is a convention center located on the artificial island of Chubu Centrair International Airport in Tokoname City, Aichi Prefecture, Japan.

== Overview ==
The plan calls for the construction of a 60,000-square-meter (650,000 sq ft) international exhibition center on a 28.7 hectares (71 acres) development site (Chubu Rinku City) on the Chubu Centrair International Airport Island owned by the Aichi Prefectural Enterprise Bureau. On October 28, 2014, Aichi Prefecture Governor Hideaki Ōmura announced plans for the construction of a large-scale international exhibition center, which was subsequently finalized on February 3, 2016. Upon completion, it became Japan's fourth-largest international exhibition center after Tokyo Big Sight, Makuhari Messe, and Intex Osaka.

Due to the impact of the 2020 Tokyo Olympic and Paralympic Games, Tokyo Big Sight, Makuhari Messe, and other venues were being used, making it difficult to hold exhibitions in the Tokyo metropolitan area. Construction of the facility was completed in mid-June 2019 and opened on August 30 of the same year.

The facility's design is relatively simple and intended to reduce operating costs and construction time. The bidding process for the design and construction company was conducted using a comprehensive evaluation system, with four companies and consortia participating. On October 17, 2016, Takenaka Corporation was announced as the successful bidder for approximately 34.1 billion yen.

The facility will be operated under a concession system with an operating period of at least 15 years. Proposals are being solicited for the maintenance and operation of the exhibition center, ancillary businesses such as parking and food and beverage services, and optional businesses to be combined with the exhibition center. A preferred bidder is scheduled to be selected around October 2017. Usage fees will be set at approximately 60% of those charged at large exhibition centers in the Tokyo metropolitan area and Osaka. An occupancy rate of 25% is expected to break even.

The City of Nagoya plans to redevelop the Nagoya International Exhibition Center (Port Messe Nagoya) (expanding it to 40,000 square meters (430,000 sq ft)) and build a new international exhibition center (50,000 square meters (540,000 sq ft)) at Sorami Pier. The City of Nagoya had proposed a joint venture with Aichi Prefecture for the new international exhibition center, but delays occurred due to difficulties in securing land. Aichi Prefecture, which had aimed to open the center in 2019, decided to build an international exhibition center at Chubu Centrair International Airport on its own, and the City of Nagoya changed its policy to proceed independently. While Aichi Prefecture envisions collaboration with the expanded Port Messe Nagoya, it expressed opposition to the City of Nagoya's construction of the new international exhibition center.

The City of Nagoya subsequently announced that it had abandoned plans to build a new exhibition center at Sorami Pier.

It is the only permanent bonded exhibition center in Japan with a customs-free zone where exhibits arriving from overseas are not subject to import duties, instead going through a simple process to enter the exhibition. For participating companies from abroad, allowing them to make full use of their exhibition time. As Japan's only international exhibition center adjacent to an airport, it boasts easy access from overseas.

== Facilities ==
The facility will include six exhibition halls, including one pillar-free hall that can be used for concerts and other events, as well as conference rooms, an entrance, parking, and an outdoor multi-purpose area. The exhibition halls' backyards are located on the north and east sides of the building, providing ample space for 10-ton trucks to pass each other.

- Entrance
- Exhibition Hall A（100×100m, 10,000 square meters）
  - A pillar-free space intended for use in concerts and other events. It can accommodate 6,500 seated attendees.
- Exhibition Halls B～F（135×75m each, 10,000 square meters）
  - Five sections, B through F, are intended for use in exhibitions and other events. Six shutters are installed between adjacent halls, allowing for integrated use.
- Conference Rooms（3,000 square meters）
  - Large, medium, and small conference rooms are located adjacent to the entrance hall.
- Multi-purpose Area（4.4ha）
  - Outdoor exhibition space and temporary parking lot.

== Events ==
The exhibition hall hosts exhibitions, concerts, and seminars on job hunting and other topics.

Major exhibitions held here include the 2021 FOOMA JAPAN, the world's largest food manufacturing exhibition (previously held at Tokyo Big Sight but unavailable due to the Tokyo Olympics), which marked the first time the entire facility was used for an event since the facility's opening. In 2022, the 1st Nagoya Motorcycle Show was held in Nagoya, Japan's third largest motorcycle show after Tokyo and Osaka.

Special Meitetsu trains may operate during large-scale events.

The opening ceremony will be the live entertainment and esports festival "AICHI IMPACT! 2019".

== Access ==
Public transportation to the airport (bus, train, and high-speed ferry) is centralized at the Access Plaza, directly connected to Chubu Centrair International Airport Station on the Meitetsu Airport Line, adjacent to the terminal building. The exhibition center is a five-minute walk away.

== Gallery ==
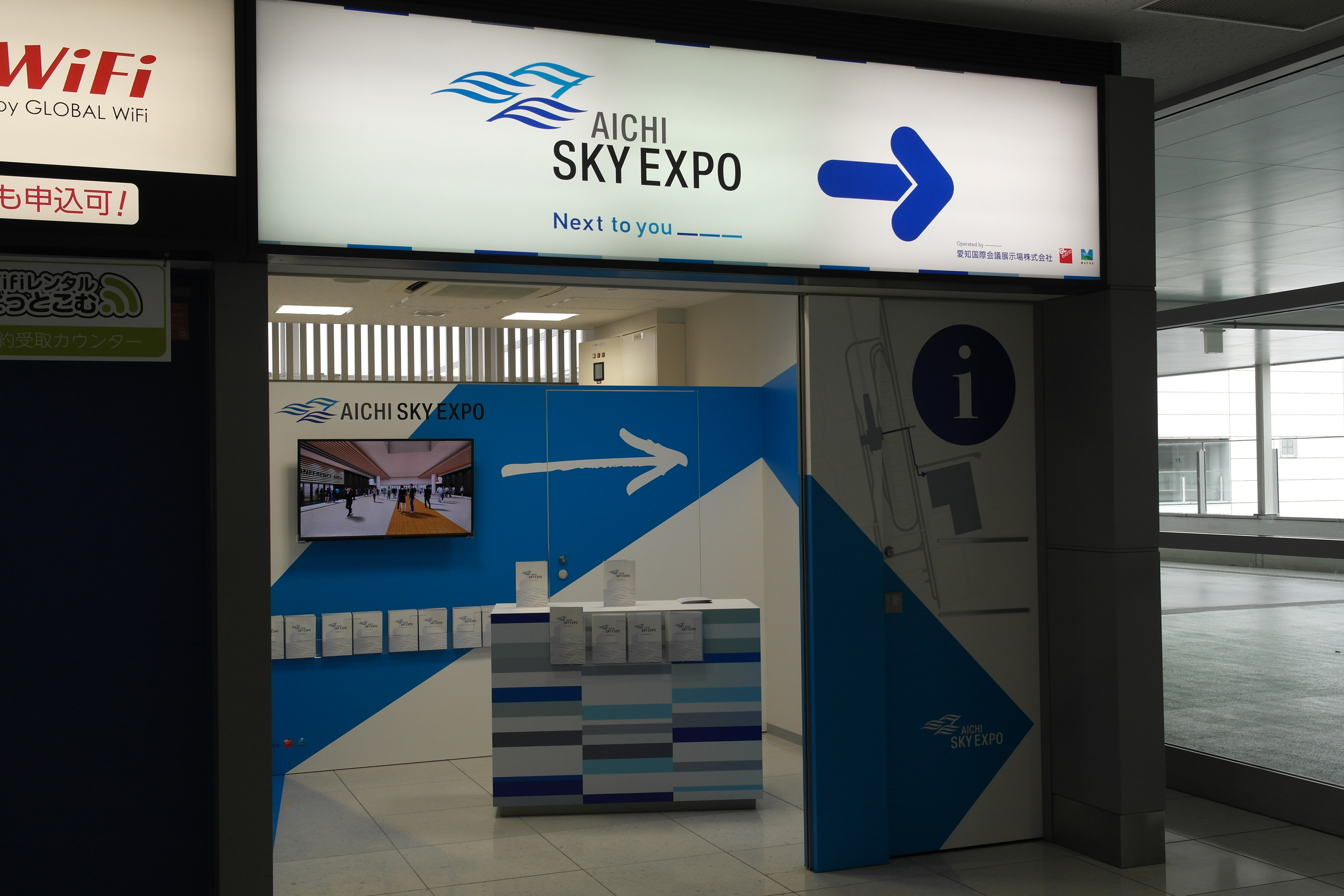
Information booth set up in Access Plaza.

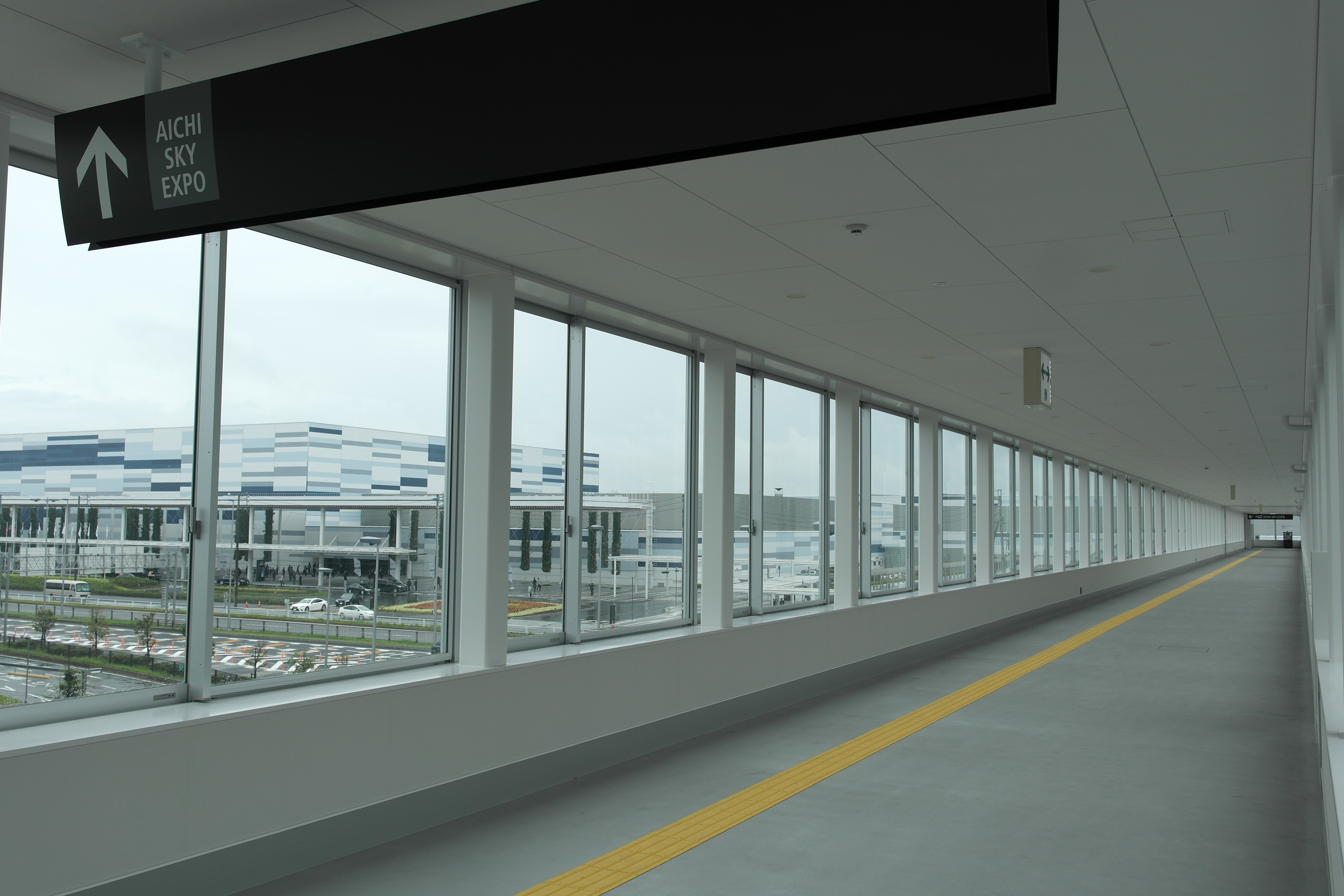
Exhibition hall seen from the pedestrian deck.
