= Wang Zijie =

Chinese fencer

Personal information
- Born: 15 July 1996 (age 29)

Fencing career
- Sport: Fencing
- Country: China
- Weapon: Épée
- Hand: Right-handed
- FIE ranking: current ranking
Medal record
Representing China
Asian Championships
Gold medal – first place	2019 Chiba	Team
Gold medal – first place	2025 Bali	Individual
Bronze medal – third place	2022 Seoul	Team
Bronze medal – third place	2024 Kuwait City	Team
Bronze medal – third place	2025 Bali	Team
World University Games
Silver medal – second place	2021 Chengdu	Team

Wang Zijie (born 15 July 1996) is a Chinese left-handed épée fencer. He competed in the men's team épée event at the 2020 Summer Olympics held in Tokyo, Japan.
