= Vadim Sharlaimov =

Kazakhstani fencer

Personal information
- Native name: Вадим Шарлаимов
- Born: 9 December 1996 (age 29)
- Height: 2.00 m (6 ft 7 in)

Fencing career
- Sport: Fencing
- Country: Kazakhstan
- Weapon: épée
- Hand: right-handed
Medal record
Men's épée
Representing Kazakhstan
World Championships
Gold medal – first place	2026 Hong Kong	Team
Bronze medal – third place	2025 Tbilisi	Team
Asian Games
Gold medal – first place	2026 Aichi–Nagoya	Team
Silver medal – second place	2022 Hangzhou	Team
Islamic Solidarity Games
Gold medal – first place	2025 Riyadh	Team

Vadim Sharlaimov (Russian: Вадим Шарлаимов, born 9 December 1996) is a Kazakhstani right-handed fencer. He competed in the 2024 Summer Olympics in both the Men's Épée Individual and Men's Épée Team events. He was part of the bronze medal-winning Kazakhstani team at the 2025 World Fencing Championships.
