= Koki Kano =

Japanese fencer (born 1997)

Personal information
- Born: 19 December 1997 (age 28) Ama, Japan

Sport
- Sport: Fencing
Medal record
Men's épée
Representing Japan
Olympic Games
Gold medal – first place	2020 Tokyo	Team
Gold medal – first place	2024 Paris	Individual
Silver medal – second place	2024 Paris	Team
World Championships
Gold medal – first place	2025 Tbilisi	Individual
Gold medal – first place	2025 Tbilisi	Team
Bronze medal – third place	2022 Cairo	Team
Asian Games
Gold medal – first place	2018 Jakarta-Palembang	Team
Gold medal – first place	2022 Hangzhou	Individual
Gold medal – first place	2022 Hangzhou	Team
Gold medal – first place	2026 Aichi–Nagoya	Individual
Bronze medal – third place	2018 Jakarta-Palembang	Individual
Bronze medal – third place	2026 Aichi–Nagoya	Team
Asian Fencing Championships
Gold medal – first place	2022 Seoul	Individual
Gold medal – first place	2023 Wuxi	Individual
Gold medal – first place	2023 Wuxi	Team
Silver medal – second place	2024 Kuwait City	Team
Bronze medal – third place	2018 Bangkok	Individual
Bronze medal – third place	2019 Chiba	Team
Bronze medal – third place	2022 Seoul	Team

Koki Kano (加納 虹輝, Kanō Kōki, born 19 December 1997) is a Japanese right-handed épée fencer.

== Career ==
Kano was a member of the Japanese team that won gold in the team épée event at the 2020 Summer Olympics in Tokyo. It was Japan's first Olympic gold medal in fencing.

Kano won the individual épée gold medal at the 2022 and 2023 Asian Fencing Championships.

At the 2024 Summer Olympics in Paris, Kano won the individual épée gold medal, beating Yannick Borel of France. This was Japan's first individual gold medal in any fencing event. He then won the silver medal in team épée event.

At the 2025 World Fencing Championships, Kano won the individual épée gold medal, beating Gergely Siklósi of Hungary.

== Medal record ==
=== Olympic Games ===
Year	Location	Event	Position
2021	Tokyo, Japan	Team Men's Épée	1st
2024	Paris, France	Individual Men's Épée	1st
2024	Paris, France	Team Men's Épée	2nd

=== World Championship ===
Year	Location	Event	Position
2022	Cairo, Egypt	Team Men's Épée	3rd
2025	(Georgia (country)) Tbilisi, Georgia	Individual Men's Épée	1st
2025	(Georgia (country)) Tbilisi, Georgia	Team Men's Épée	1st

=== Grand Prix ===
Date	Location	Event	Position
2024-05-03	Cali, Colombia	Individual Men's Épée	1st

=== World Cup ===
Date	Location	Event	Position
2017-01-26	Heidenheim, Germany	Individual Men's Épée	3rd
2017-05-12	Paris, France	Individual Men's Épée	3rd
2019-01-10	Heidenheim, Germany	Individual Men's Épée	3rd
2019-02-08	Vancouver, Canada	Individual Men's Épée	1st
2022-11-11	Bern, Switzerland	Individual Men's Épée	3rd
2023-02-23	Heidenheim, Germany	Individual Men's Épée	1st
2023-12-08	Heidenheim, Germany	Individual Men's Épée	3rd

=== Asian Championship ===
Year	Location	Event	Position
2018	Bangkok, Thailand	Individual Men's Épée	3rd
2019	Tokyo, Japan	Team Men's Épée	3rd
2022	Seoul, South Korea	Individual Men's Épée	1st
2022	Seoul, South Korea	Team Men's Épée	3rd
2023	Wuxi, China	Individual Men's Épée	1st
2023	Wuxi, China	Team Men's Épée	1st
