= Vadim Anokhin =

Russian male épée fencer

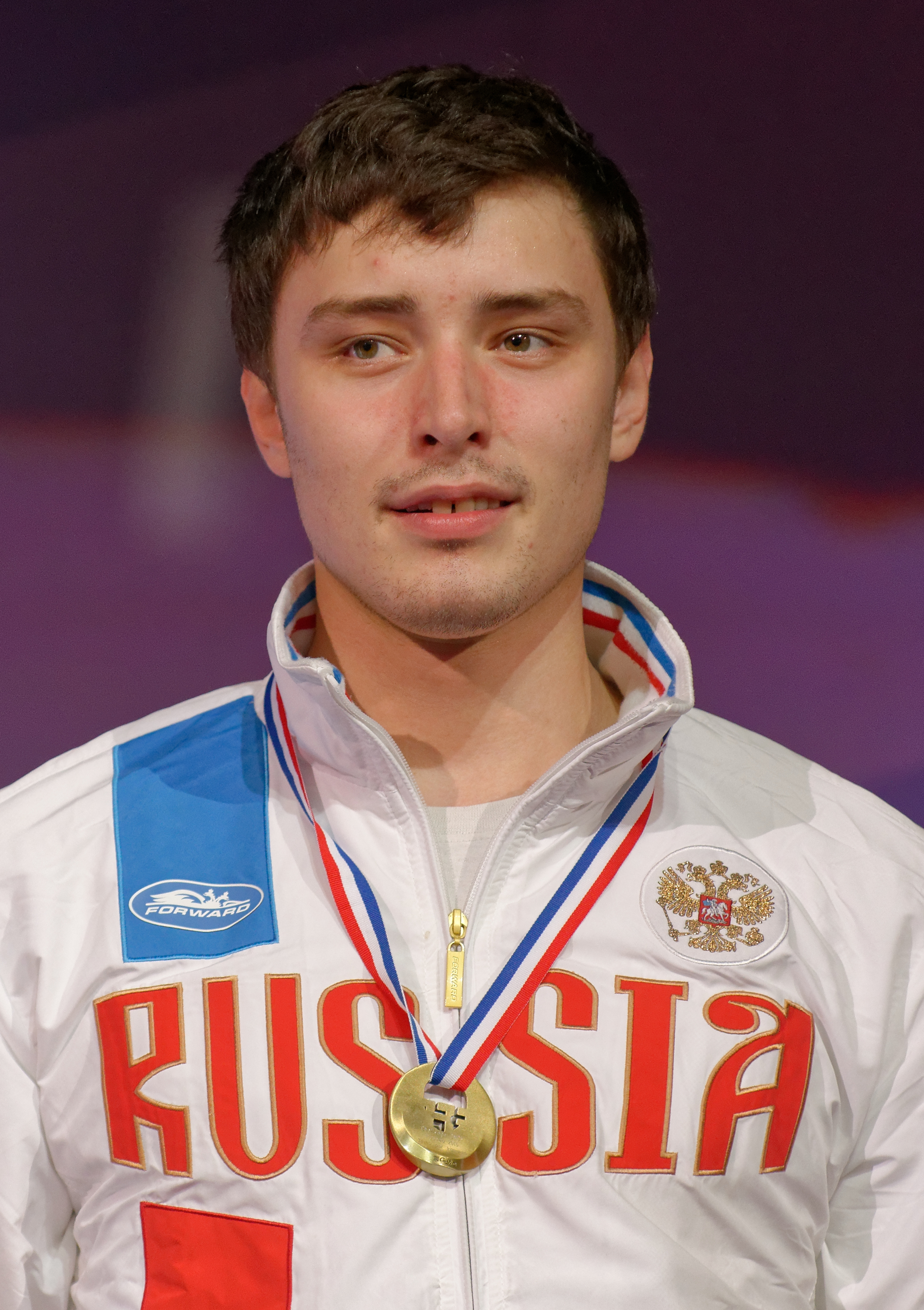
- Anokhin in 2015

Personal information
- Full name: Vadim Vladimirovich Anokhin
- Born: 2 January 1992 (age 34) Kaluga, Russia
- Height: 1.91 m (6 ft 3 in)
- Weight: 95 kg (209 lb)

Fencing career
- Sport: Fencing
- Country: Russia
- Weapon: Épée
- Hand: Right-handed
- Club: MGFSO Moscow
- FIE ranking: current ranking
Medal record
Men's fencing
Representing Russia
European Championships
Gold medal – first place	2017 Tbilisi	Team épée

Vadim Vladimirovich Anokhin (Russian: Вадим Владимирович Анохин, born 2 January 1992) is a Russian male épée fencer.

He took up fencing in 2001 with coach Olga Abrosikova and joined in 2008 the junior Russian national team, with whom he became junior world champion in 2012 and U23 European champion in 2014. In the senior category, he won the 2015 Doha Grand Prix. He was named into the Russian team qualified to the 2016 Summer Olympics as the top épée fencer in national rankings.
