= Kweon Young-jun =

South Korean fencer

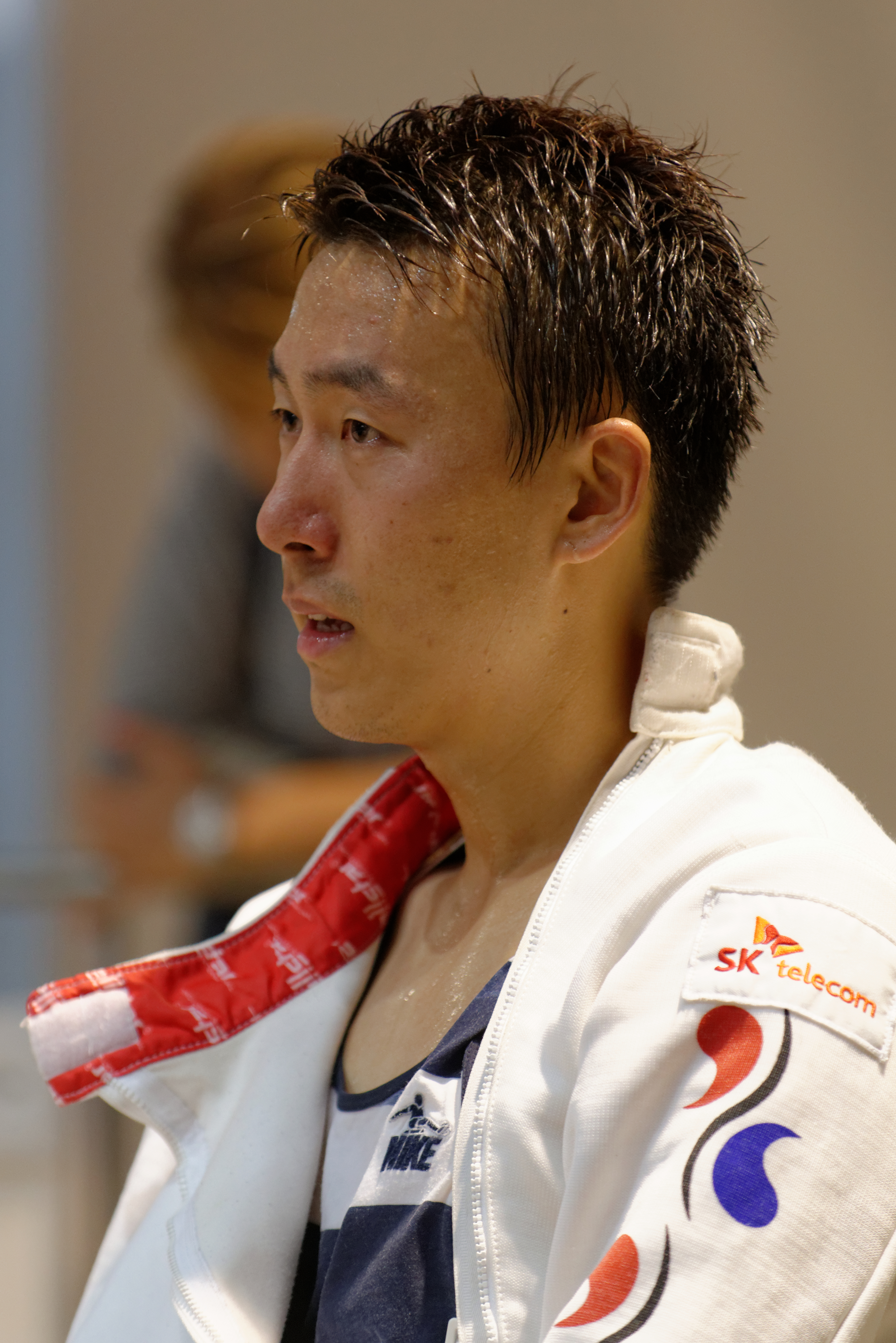
- Kweon at the 2013 World Fencing Championships

Personal information
- Born: March 29, 1987 (age 39) Cheongju, North Chungcheong, South Korea
- Height: 187 cm (6 ft 2 in)
- Weight: 88 kg (194 lb)

Fencing career
- Sport: Fencing
- Country: South Korea
- Weapon: Épée
- Hand: Right-handed
- Club: Iksan City Hall
- FIE ranking: current ranking
Medal record
Representing South Korea
Olympic Games
Bronze medal – third place	2020 Tokyo	Team épée
Asian Games
Gold medal – first place	2014 Incheon	Team epée
Bronze medal – third place	2018 Jakarta	Team épée
Bronze medal – third place	2022 Hangzhou	Team épée

- Kweon Young-jun
- Hangul: 권영준
- RR: Gwon Yeongjun
- MR: Kwŏn Yŏngjun

Kweon Young-jun (Korean: 권영준; born March 29, 1987) is a South Korean right-handed épée fencer and 2021 team Olympic bronze medalist.

== Medal record ==
=== Olympic Games ===
Year	Location	Event	Position
2021	Tokyo, Japan	Team Men's Épée	3rd

=== World Championship ===
Year	Location	Event	Position
2014	Kazan, Russia	Team Men's Épée	2nd
2015	Moscow, Russia	Team Men's Épée	2nd
2018	Wuxi, China	Team Men's Épée	2nd

=== Asian Championship ===
Year	Location	Event	Position
2012	Wakayama, Japan	Team Men's Épée	1st
2013	Shanghai, China	Individual Men's Épée	2nd
2013	Shanghai, China	Team Men's Épée	3rd
2014	Suwon City, South Korea	Team Men's Épée	1st
2017	Hong Kong, China	Individual Men's Épée	2nd
2017	Hong Kong, China	Team Men's Épée	1st
2019	Tokyo, Japan	Team Men's Épée	2nd

=== Grand Prix ===
Date	Location	Event	Position
12/09/2016	Doha, Qatar	Individual Men's Épée	1st
03/18/2016	Budapest, Hungary	Individual Men's Épée	3rd
