= Ruslan Kurbanov (fencer) =

Kazakhstani fencer (born 1991)

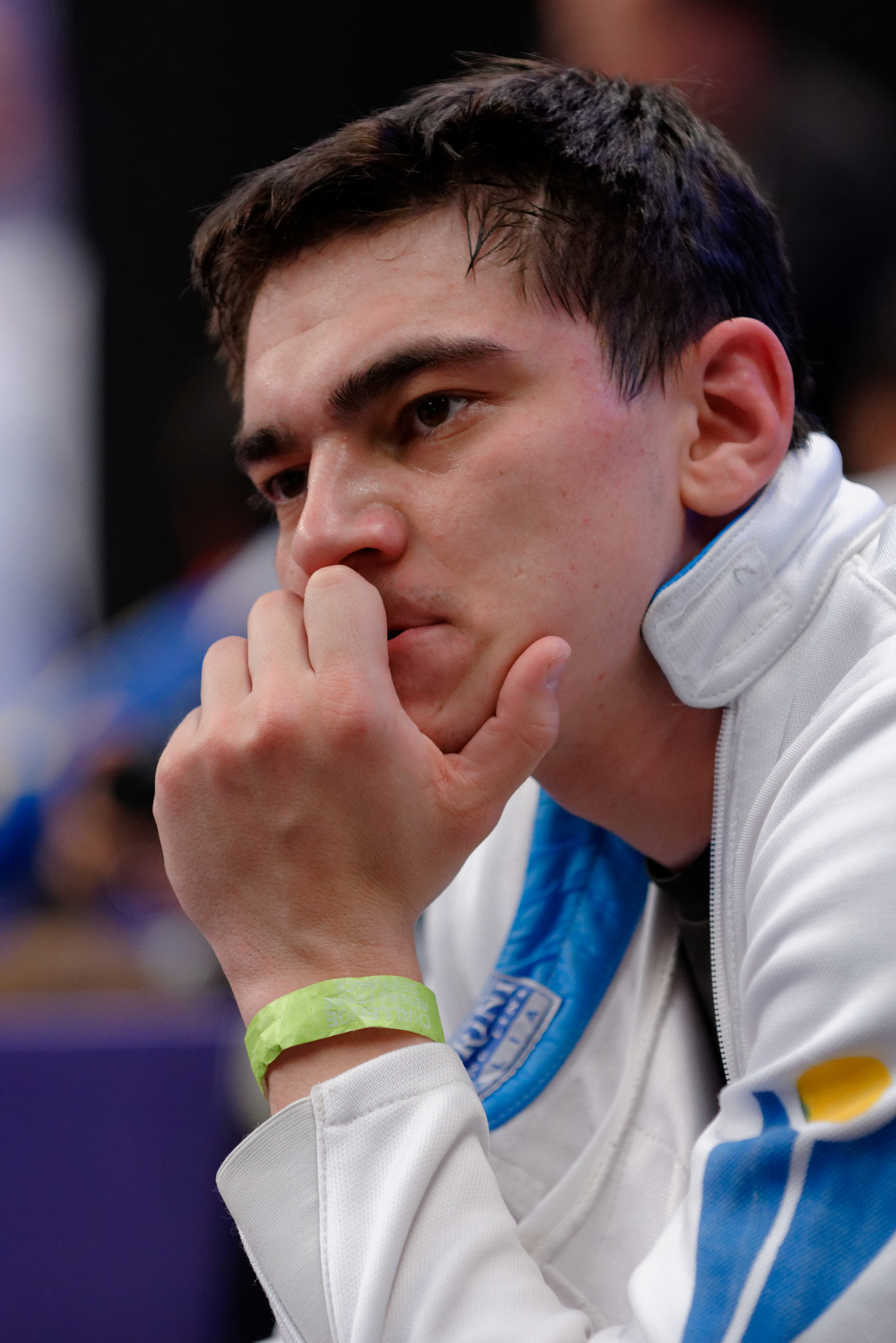
- Kurbanov at the 2014 Paris World Cup

Personal information
- Nationality: Kazakh
- Born: 17 September 1991 (age 35) Oskemen, Kazakhstan
- Height: 1.70 m (5 ft 7 in)
- Weight: 69 kg (152 lb)

Fencing career
- Sport: Fencing
- Weapon: Épée
- Hand: right-handed
- National coach: Valery Dimov
- FIE ranking: current ranking
Medal record
Men's épée
Representing Kazakhstan
World Championships
Gold medal – first place	2026 Hong Kong	Team
Bronze medal – third place	2023 Milan	Individual
Bronze medal – third place	2025 Tbilisi	Team
Asian Games
Gold medal – first place	2026 Aichi–Nagoya	Team
Silver medal – second place	2022 Hangzhou	Team
Bronze medal – third place	2014 Incheon	Team
Bronze medal – third place	2018 Jakarta	Team
Asian Championships
Gold medal – first place	2017 Hong Kong	Individual
Gold medal – first place	2013 Shanghai	Team
Gold medal – first place	2015 Singapore	Team
Gold medal – first place	2024 Kuwait City	Team
Silver medal – second place	2012 Wakayama	Team
Silver medal – second place	2018 Bangkok	Team
Silver medal – second place	2023 Wuxi	Team
Bronze medal – third place	2019 Chiba	Individual
Bronze medal – third place	2011 Seoul	Team
Bronze medal – third place	2016 Wuxi	Team
Bronze medal – third place	2019 Chiba	Team
Summer Universiade
Silver medal – second place	2013 Kazan	Individual
Bronze medal – third place	2013 Kazan	Team

Ruslan Kurbanov (Kazakh: Руслан Курбанов; born 17 September 1991) is a Kazakhstani épée fencer, who earned a silver medal in the individual event at the 2013 Summer Universiade and a bronze medal in the team event. The same year, he became champion of Kazakhstan after defeating Asian champion Elmir Alimzhanov.

Kurbanov competed for Kazakhstan at the 2020 Summer Olympics in the men's épée event. He also competed for Kazakhstan at the 2024 Summer Olympics in the men's épée and men's team épée events.

His ex-wife Tamara Pochekutova is a sabre fencer. They have one son, born in 2013. Kurbanov is from Tatar descent.
