= Khalifah Al-Omairi =

Saudi Arabian fencer (born 1998)

Personal information
- Born: 19 October 1998 (age 27)

Fencing career
- Sport: Fencing
- Country: Saudi Arabia
- Weapon: Épée
- Hand: Left-handed
Medal record
Men's épée
Representing Saudi Arabia
World Championships
Bronze medal – third place	2026 Hong Kong	Individual
Islamic Solidarity Games
Silver medal – second place	2025 Riyadh	Team
Bronze medal – third place	2025 Riyadh	Individual

Khalifah Al-Omairi (born 19 October 1998) is a Saudi Arabian left-handed épée fencer. He is the first Saudi athlete to medal at the World Fencing Championships.

== Career ==
Al-Omairi competed at the 2025 Islamic Solidarity Games and won a bronze medal in the individual épée event.

In July 2026, he competed at the 2026 World Fencing Championships and won a bronze medal in the individual épée event. He became the first Saudi athlete to medal at the World Fencing Championships.
