= Lan Minghao =

Chinese fencer (born 1996)

Personal information
- Born: 28 August 1996 (age 30) Hefei, China

Sport
- Sport: Fencing
Medal record
Asian Championships
| Bronze medal – third place | 2024 Kuwait City | Team |
World University Games
| Silver medal – second place | 2021 Chengdu | Team |

Lan Minghao (born 28 August 1996) is a Chinese épée fencer. He competed in the 2020 Summer Olympics.

== Medal record ==
=== World Cup ===
| Date | Location | Event | Position |
|---|---|---|---|
| 2023-3-25 | Buenos Aires, Argentina | Individual Men's Épée | 2nd |
