= Men's épée at the 2019 World Fencing Championships =

- Venue: SYMA Sports and Conference Centre
- Location: Budapest, Hungary
- Dates: 16–19 July

Medalists
gold medal	Gergely Siklósi	Hungary
silver medal	Sergey Bida	Russia
bronze medal	Andrea Santarelli	Italy
bronze medal	Ihor Reizlin	Ukraine

The Men's épée competition at the 2019 World Fencing Championships was held on 19 July 2019. The qualification was held on 16 July.

== Draw ==
=== Finals ===
Semifinals
(Italy) Andrea Santarelli	9
(Hungary) Gergely Siklósi	15
(Ukraine) Ihor Reizlin	10
(Russia) Sergey Bida	15

Final
(Hungary) Gergely Siklósi	15
(Russia) Sergey Bida	14

=== Top half ===
==== Section 1 ====
Round of 64
(France) Yannick Borel	15
(Italy) Marco Fichera	12
(Austria) Josef Mahringer	10
(Denmark) Patrick Jørgensen	15
(France) Ronan Gustin	15
(Poland) Radosław Zawrotniak	5
(Canada) Marc-Antoine Blais-Bélanger	7
(Switzerland) Max Heinzer	15
(Spain) Yulen Pereira	12
(Estonia) Sten Priinits	15
(China) Lan Minghao	12
(France) Alexandre Bardenet	15
(United States) Adam Rodney	15
(Cuba) Yunior Reytor Venet	9
(Chile) Pablo Nuñez	8
(Italy) Andrea Santarelli	15

Round of 32
(France) Yannick Borel	15
(Denmark) Patrick Jørgensen	11
(France) Ronan Gustin	13
(Switzerland) Max Heinzer	12
(Estonia) Sten Priinits	11
(France) Alexandre Bardenet	15
(United States) Adam Rodney	10
(Italy) Andrea Santarelli	15

Round of 16
(France) Yannick Borel	15
(France) Ronan Gustin	10
(France) Alexandre Bardenet	9
(Italy) Andrea Santarelli	15

Quarterfinals
(France) Yannick Borel	12
(Italy) Andrea Santarelli	15

==== Section 2 ====
Round of 64
(South Korea) Park Sang-young	15
(United Kingdom) Philip Marsh	10
(Venezuela) Francisco Limardo	10
(Hungary) Gergely Siklósi	15
(Japan) Masaru Yamada	15
(Uzbekistan) Oleg Sokolov	9
(France) Romain Cannone	15
(United States) Jacob Hoyle	14
(Netherlands) Bas Verwijlen	15
(United States) James Kaull	8
(Czech Republic) Jakub Jurka	15
(Romania) Mario Persu	10
(Hungary) András Rédli	15
(Switzerland) Michele Niggeler	11
(Switzerland) Lucas Malcotti	9
(Venezuela) Rubén Limardo	15

Round of 32
(South Korea) Park Sang-young	9
(Hungary) Gergely Siklósi	10
(Japan) Masaru Yamada	15
(France) Romain Cannone	12
(Netherlands) Bas Verwijlen	15
(Czech Republic) Jakub Jurka	14
(Hungary) András Rédli	12
(Venezuela) Rubén Limardo	11

Round of 16
(Hungary) Gergely Siklósi	10
(Japan) Masaru Yamada	9
(Netherlands) Bas Verwijlen	8
(Hungary) András Rédli	7

Quarterfinals
(Hungary) Gergely Siklósi	15
(Netherlands) Bas Verwijlen	8

=== Bottom half ===
==== Section 3 ====
Round of 64
(Ukraine) Bohdan Nikishyn	15
(South Korea) Kim Sang-min	8
(Poland) Mateusz Antkiewicz	12
(China) Song Hongjie	13
(Ukraine) Ihor Reizlin	15
(Poland) Mateusz Nycz	10
(Czech Republic) Martin Čapek	15
(Israel) Yuval Freilich	13
(United States) Curtis McDowald	9
(Egypt) Ahmed El-Saghir	15
(Czech Republic) Jiří Beran	9
(Kazakhstan) Ruslan Kurbanov	15
(Luxembourg) Flavio Giannotte	5
(Russia) Nikita Glaszkov	15
(Hungary) Dávid Nagy	10
(Kazakhstan) Dmitriy Alexanin	15

Round of 32
(Ukraine) Bohdan Nikishyn	15
(China) Song Hongjie	7
(Ukraine) Ihor Reizlin	15
(Czech Republic) Martin Čapek	12
(Egypt) Ahmed El-Saghir	14
(Kazakhstan) Ruslan Kurbanov	15
(Russia) Nikita Glaszkov	9
(Kazakhstan) Dmitriy Alexanin	15

Round of 16
(Ukraine) Bohdan Nikishyn	14
(Ukraine) Ihor Reizlin	15
(Kazakhstan) Ruslan Kurbanov	15
(Kazakhstan) Dmitriy Alexanin	7

Quarterfinals
(Ukraine) Ihor Reizlin	15
(Kazakhstan) Ruslan Kurbanov	12

==== Section 4 ====
Round of 64
(Japan) Koki Kano	15
(Finland) Tatu Nuotio	8
(South Korea) Kweon Young-jun	11
(Kazakhstan) Vadim Sharlamov	15
(Denmark) Frederik Von Der Osten	15
(Italy) Enrico Garozzo	10
(Hong Kong) Fong Hoi Sun	8
(Ukraine) Roman Svichkar	15
(Italy) Gabriele Cimini	14
(Switzerland) Benjamin Steffen	15
(Russia) Sergey Bida	15
(Germany) Stephan Rein	10
(Japan) Satoru Uyama	15
(Finland) Niko Vuorinen	7
(Hong Kong) Ng Ho Tin	13
(Japan) Kazuyasu Minobe	15

Round of 32
(Japan) Koki Kano	15
(Kazakhstan) Vadim Sharlamov	6
(Denmark) Frederik Von Der Osten	15
(Ukraine) Roman Svichkar	10
(Switzerland) Benjamin Steffen	12
(Russia) Sergey Bida	15
(Japan) Satoru Uyama	15
(Japan) Kazuyasu Minobe	13

Round of 16
(Japan) Koki Kano	15
(Denmark) Frederik Von Der Osten	6
(Russia) Sergey Bida	15
(Japan) Satoru Uyama	10

Quarterfinals
(Japan) Koki Kano	12
(Russia) Sergey Bida	15
