= Fencing at the 2017 Summer Universiade – Men's team épée =

Fencing event

Men's team épée at the XXIX Summer Universiade
- Venues: Taipei Nangang Exhibition Center
- Dates: 24 August 2017
- Competitors: 86 from 21 nations

Medalists
1st place, gold medalist(s)		Sergey Bida; Dmitriy Gusev; Alan Fardzinov; Georgiy Bruev	Russia
2nd place, silver medalist(s)		Zsombor Bányai; Daniel Berta; Gergely Siklósi; Sándor Cho Taeun	Hungary
3rd place, bronze medalist(s)		Jang Hyo-min; Hwang Hyeon-il; Kim Jae-won; Pak Min-woo	South Korea

The men's team épée fencing event at the 2017 Summer Universiade was held 24 August at the Taipei Nangang Exhibition Center in Taipei, Taiwan.

== Seeds ==
Since the number of individual épée event participants were 97, 98 was the added number on those who did not participate in the individual event.

Tournament Seeding	Team	Name	RI
1 (37)	France	Virgile Marchal	7
1 (37)	France	Alexandre Bardenet	13
1 (37)	France	Jonathan Bonnaire	17
1 (37)	France	Mathias Biabiany	27
2 (56)	Ukraine	Anatoliy Herey	6
2 (56)	Ukraine	Roman Svichkar	11
2 (56)	Ukraine	Volodymyr Stankevych	39
2 (56)	Ukraine	Yan Sych	52
3 (58)	Japan	Masaru Yamada	3
3 (58)	Japan	Ryosuke Narita	21
3 (58)	Japan	Koki Kano	34
3 (58)	Japan	Kentaro Murayama	65
4 (61)	Hungary	Zsombor Bányai	2
4 (61)	Hungary	Daniel Berta	28
4 (61)	Hungary	Gergely Siklósi	31
4 (61)	Hungary	Sándor Cho Taeun	67
5 (61)	United States	Gabriel Canaux	10
5 (61)	United States	Justin Yoo	25
5 (61)	United States	Lewis Weiss	26
5 (61)	United States	Jacob Hoyle	49
6 (68)	Switzerland	Alexandre Pittet	12
6 (68)	Switzerland	Georg Kuhn	16
6 (68)	Switzerland	Michele Niggeler	36
6 (68)	Switzerland	Alexis Bayard	51
7 (67)	Russia	Sergey Bida	1
7 (67)	Russia	Dmitriy Gusev	28
7 (67)	Russia	Alan Fardzinov	38
7 (67)	Russia	Georgiy Bruev	77
8 (86)	Israel	Ido Herpe	9
8 (86)	Israel	Yuval Shalom Freilich	35
8 (86)	Israel	Ariel Drizin	42
8 (86)	Israel	Amit Parizat	54
9 (88)	South Korea	Jang Hyo-min	15
9 (88)	South Korea	Hwang Hyeon-il	24
9 (88)	South Korea	Kim Jae-won	49
9 (88)	South Korea	Pak Min-woo	81
10 (100)	Italy	Valerio Cuomo	22
10 (100)	Italy	Lorenzo Buzzi	30
10 (100)	Italy	Gabriele Cimini	48
10 (100)	Italy	Federico Vismara	62
11 (104)	Finland	Niko Vuorinen	5
11 (104)	Finland	Rufus Panelius	46
11 (104)	Finland	Teemu Seeve	53
11 (104)	Finland	Gunnar Gräsbeck	76
12 (111)	Netherlands	Tristan Tulen	23
12 (111)	Netherlands	Rafael Tulen	32
12 (111)	Netherlands	David van Nunen	56
12 (111)	Netherlands	Serge Mes	88
13 (117)	Germany	Lukas Bellmann	19
13 (117)	Germany	Richard Schmidt	20
13 (117)	Germany	Alexander Riedel	78
13 (117)	Germany	Nikolaus Bodoczi	82
14 (119)	Poland	Filip Broniszewski	3
14 (119)	Poland	Jan Wenglarczyk	44
14 (119)	Poland	Daniel Marcol	72
14 (119)	Poland	Maciej Bielec	75
15 (147)	Kazakhstan	Ruslan Kurbanov	45
15 (147)	Kazakhstan	Dmitriy Alexanin	47
15 (147)	Kazakhstan	Ivan Deryabin	55
15 (147)	Kazakhstan	Vadim Sharlaimov	71
16 (153)	Chinese Taipei	Ting Hong-kai	14
16 (153)	Chinese Taipei	Chen Tsung-lin	60
16 (153)	Chinese Taipei	Wu Yu-ting	79
16 (153)	Chinese Taipei	Chuang Po-yu	84
17 (179)	China	Shen Zihao	41
17 (179)	China	Ye Deze	68
17 (179)	China	Xu Jingjing	70
17 (179)	China	Wang Zicheng	98
18 (229)	Sweden	Anton Kimfors	57
18 (229)	Sweden	Max Korlinge	85
18 (229)	Sweden	Henrik Jarl	87
19 (245)	Portugal	Max Rod	61
19 (245)	Portugal	José Bartissol	86
19 (245)	Portugal	Jose Charreu	98
19 (245)	Portugal	Pedro Macedo	98
20 (250)	India	Pankaj Kumar Sharma	74
20 (250)	India	Akshay Manoharan Sajitha	80
20 (250)	India	Tushar Ravsaheb Aher	96
20 (250)	India	Vir Sangram Singh	96
21 (273)	Mongolia	Bat-Erdene Erdenebat	89
21 (273)	Mongolia	Dulguun Enkhtsogt	91
21 (273)	Mongolia	Amarbold Batsuren	93
21 (273)	Mongolia	Jigjidsuren Tsoggerel	94

== Ranking Round ==
Round of 32
17	China	45
16	Chinese Taipei	43
21	Mongolia	21
12	Netherlands	45
13	Germany	45
20	India	27
19	Portugal	38
14	Poland	45
15	Kazakhstan	45
18	Sweden	20

Round of 16
1	France	45
17	China	28
9	South Korea	45
8	Israel	40
5	United States	43
12	Netherlands	45
13	Germany	44
4	Hungary	45
3	Japan	31
14	Poland	29
11	Finland	45
6	Switzerland	40
7	Russia	45
10	Italy	40
15	Kazakhstan	45
2	Ukraine	36

Quarterfinals
1	France	36
9	South Korea	45
12	Netherlands	28
4	Hungary	35
3	Japan	45
11	Finland	35
7	Russia	44
15	Kazakhstan	37

Semifinals
9	South Korea	19
4	Hungary	25
3	Japan	30
7	Russia	31

Final
4	Hungary	30
7	Russia	31

=== Bronze Medal ===
Third place
9	South Korea	45
3	Japan	40

== Final ranking ==
Rank	Team	Results
1st place, gold medalist(s)	Russia	Champion
2nd place, silver medalist(s)	Hungary	Runner-up
3rd place, bronze medalist(s)	South Korea	Third place
4	Japan	Semifinals
5	France	Quarterfinals
6	Finland	Quarterfinals
7	Netherlands	Quarterfinals
8	Kazakhstan	Quarterfinals
9	Ukraine	Round of 16
10	United States	Round of 16
11	Switzerland	Round of 16
12	Israel	Round of 16
13	Italy	Round of 16
14	Germany	Round of 16
15	Poland	Round of 16
16	China	Round of 16
17	Chinese Taipei	Round of 32
18	Sweden	Round of 32
19	Portugal	Round of 32
20	India	Round of 32
21	Mongolia	Round of 32
