= Fencing at the 2020 Summer Olympics – Men's épée =

Fencing at the Olympics

Men's épée at the Games of the XXXII Olympiad
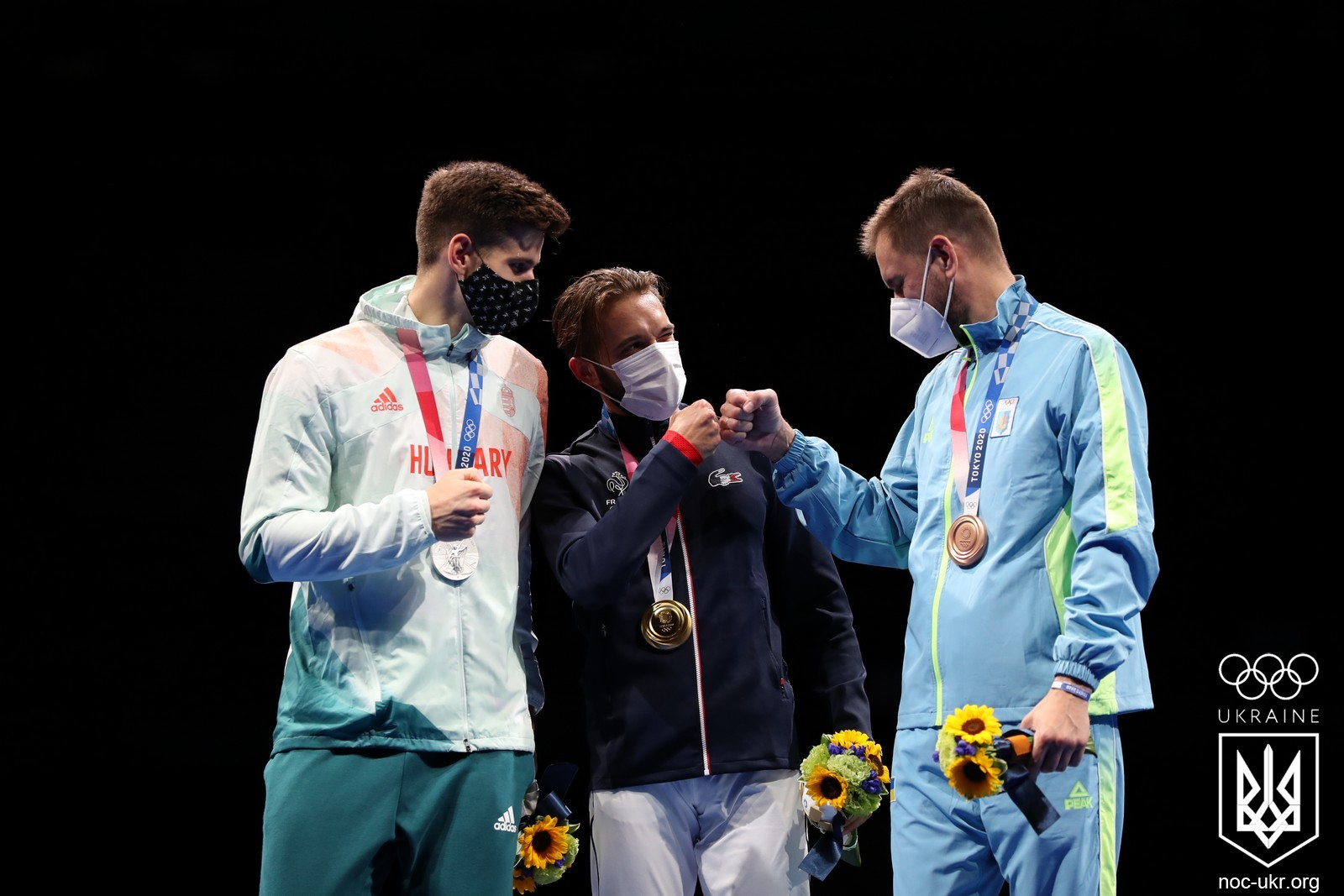
- Venue: Makuhari Messe
- Date: 25 July 2021
- Competitors: 36 from 18 nations

Medalists
1st place, gold medalist(s)		Romain Cannone	France
2nd place, silver medalist(s)		Gergely Siklósi	Hungary
3rd place, bronze medalist(s)		Ihor Reizlin	Ukraine

The men's épée event at the 2020 Summer Olympics took place on 25 July 2021 at the Makuhari Messe. 36 fencers from 18 nations competed.

The medals for the competition were presented by Pál Schmitt, Hungary; IOC Member, and the medalists' bouquets were presented by Pascal Tesch, Luxembourg; FIE Executive Committee Member.

== Background ==
This marked the 28th occurrence of the event, which was not conducted at the inaugural Games in 1896 (with only foil and sabre events taking place) but has been included in every Summer Olympics since 1900.

The reigning Olympic champion was Park Sang-young of South Korea. The reigning (2019) World Champion was Gergely Siklósi of Hungary.

== Qualification ==
A National Olympic Committee (NOC) could enter up to 3 qualified fencers in the men's épée. Nations were limited to three fencers each from 1928 to 2004. However, the 2008 Games introduced a rotation of men's team fencing events with one weapon left off each Games; the individual event without a corresponding team event had the number of fencers per nation reduced to two. Men's épée was the second event this applied to, so each nation could enter a maximum of two fencers in the event in 2012. The 2020 Games eliminated this rotation and all weapons had team events.

There are 34 dedicated quota spots for men's épée. The first 24 spots go to the 3 members of each of the 8 qualified teams in the team épée event (France, Italy, Ukraine, Switzerland, South Korea, the United States, the ROC, and China). Next, 6 more men are selected from the world rankings based on continents: 2 from Europe, 1 from the Americas, 2 from Asia/Oceania, and 1 from Africa. Finally, 4 spots are allocated by continental qualifying events: 1 from Europe, 1 from the Americas, 1 from Asia/Oceania, and 1 from Africa. Each nation can earn only one spot through rankings or events.

Additionally, there are 8 host/invitational spots that can be spread throughout the various fencing events. Japan qualified one fencer through normal qualification and used two host quota places to complete a men's épée team.

The COVID-19 pandemic delayed many of the events for qualifying for fencing, moving the close of the rankings period back to April 5, 2021 rather than the original April 4, 2020.

== Competition format ==
The 1996 tournament had vastly simplified the competition format into a single-elimination bracket, with a bronze medal match. The 2020 tournament continued the use of that format. Fencing is done to 15 touches or to the completion of three three-minute rounds if neither fencer reaches 15 touches by then. At the end of time, the higher-scoring fencer is the winner; a tie results in an additional one-minute sudden-death time period. This sudden-death period is further modified by the selection of a draw-winner beforehand; if neither fencer scores a touch during the minute, the predetermined draw-winner wins the bout. Standard épée rules regarding target area, striking, and priority are used.

== Schedule ==
The competition is held over a single day, Sunday, 25 July. The first session runs from 9 a.m. to approximately 4:20 p.m. (when the quarterfinals are expected to conclude), after which there is a break until 6 p.m. before the semifinals and medal bouts are held. Men's épée bouts alternate with the women's foil event bouts.

All times are Japan Standard Time (UTC+9)

Date	Time	Round
Sunday, 25 July 2021	9:00 18:00	Round of 64; Round of 32; Round of 16; Quarterfinals; Semifinals; Finals

== Results ==
=== Finals ===
Semifinals
Gergely Siklósi (HUN)	15
Andrea Santarelli (ITA)	10
Ihor Reizlin (UKR)	10
Romain Cannone (FRA)	15

Final
Gergely Siklósi (HUN)	10
Romain Cannone (FRA)	15
Bronze medal bout
Andrea Santarelli (ITA)	12
Ihor Reizlin (UKR)	15

=== Top half ===
==== Section 1 ====
Round of 64
Dong Chao (CHN)	15
Marc-Antoine Blais Bélanger (CAN)	7

Round of 32
Gergely Siklósi (HUN)	15
Dong Chao (CHN)	9
Wang Zijie (CHN)	14
Houssam El-Kord (MAR)	15
Kazuyasu Minobe (JPN)	15
Jakub Jurka (CZE)	14
Jacob Hoyle (USA)	10
Park Sang-young (KOR)	15

Round of 16
Gergely Siklósi (HUN)	15
Houssam El-Kord (MAR)	13
Kazuyasu Minobe (JPN)	6
Park Sang-young (KOR)	15

Quarterfinals
Gergely Siklósi (HUN)	15
Park Sang-young (KOR)	12

==== Section 2 ====
Round of 64
Roman Petrov (KGZ)	15
Ma Se-geon (KOR)	7

Round of 32
Andrea Santarelli (ITA)	15
Sergey Khodos (ROC)	10
Curtis McDowald (USA)	12
Alexandre Bardenet (FRA)	15
Ruslan Kurbanov (KAZ)	15
Marco Fichera (ITA)	7
Roman Petrov (KGZ)	13
Masaru Yamada (JPN)	15

Round of 16
Andrea Santarelli (ITA)	15
Alexandre Bardenet (FRA)	11
Ruslan Kurbanov (KAZ)	8
Masaru Yamada (JPN)	15

Quarterfinals
Andrea Santarelli (ITA)	15
Masaru Yamada (JPN)	13

=== Bottom half ===
==== Section 3 ====
Round of 64
Pavel Sukhov (ROC)	12
Benjamin Steffen (SUI)	15

Round of 32
Ihor Reizlin (UKR)	15
Benjamin Steffen (SUI)	11
Roman Svichkar (UKR)	11
Max Heinzer (SUI)	15
Bohdan Nikishyn (UKR)	12
Lan Minghao (CHN)	13
Mohamed El-Sayed (EGY)	15
Yannick Borel (FRA)	11

Round of 16
Ihor Reizlin (UKR)	15
Max Heinzer (SUI)	12
Lan Minghao (CHN)	9
Mohamed El-Sayed (EGY)	15

Quarterfinals
Ihor Reizlin (UKR)	15
Mohamed El-Sayed (EGY)	13

==== Section 4 ====
Round of 64
Yeisser Ramirez (USA)	15
Michele Niggeler (SUI)	6

Round of 32
Bas Verwijlen (NED)	15
Kweon Young-jun (KOR)	10
Romain Cannone (FRA)	15
Rubén Limardo (VEN)	12
Koki Kano (JPN)	15
Enrico Garozzo (ITA)	12
Yeisser Ramirez (USA)	2
Sergey Bida (ROC)	15

Round of 16
Bas Verwijlen (NED)	11
Romain Cannone (FRA)	15
Koki Kano (JPN)	12
Sergey Bida (ROC)	15

Quarterfinals
Romain Cannone (FRA)	15
Sergey Bida (ROC)	12
