= Fencing at the 2015 European Games – Men's team épée =

Men's team épée at the 2015 European Games
- Venue: Crystal Hall 3
- Date: 27 June
- Competitors: 24 from 6 nations

Medalists
gold medal	Yannick Borel; Ronan Gustin; Daniel Jérent; Iván Trevejo	France
silver medal	Sergey Bida; Anton Glebko; Dmitriy Gusev; Sergey Khodos	Russia
bronze medal	Gabriele Bino; Gabriele Cimini; Marco Fichera; Andrea Santarelli	Italy

The men's team épée competition at the 2015 European Games in Baku was held on 27 June at the Crystal Hall 3.

== Results ==
Quarterfinals
Italy	45
Hungary	34
Russia	45
Azerbaijan	26

Semifinals
France	45
Italy	27
Russia	43
Switzerland	38

Final
France	45
Russia	32
Third place
Italy	44
Switzerland	40

Fifth place
Hungary	45
Azerbaijan	37

== Final standing ==
Rank	Team
1st place, gold medalist(s)	France; Yannick Borel; Ronan Gustin; Daniel Jérent; Iván Trevejo
2nd place, silver medalist(s)	Russia; Sergey Bida; Anton Glebko; Dmitriy Gusev; Sergey Khodos
3rd place, bronze medalist(s)	Italy; Gabriele Bino; Gabriele Cimini; Marco Fichera; Andrea Santarelli
4	Switzerland; Bruce Brunold; Georg Kuhn; Michele Niggeler; Florian Staub
5	Hungary; Dániel Berta; Mátyás File; Márk Hanczvikkel; Péter Szényi
6	Azerbaijan; Kanan Aliyev; Mehrab Hasanov; Najaf Maharramov; Vakil Nasibov
