= Sergey Bida =

Russian fencer (born 1993)

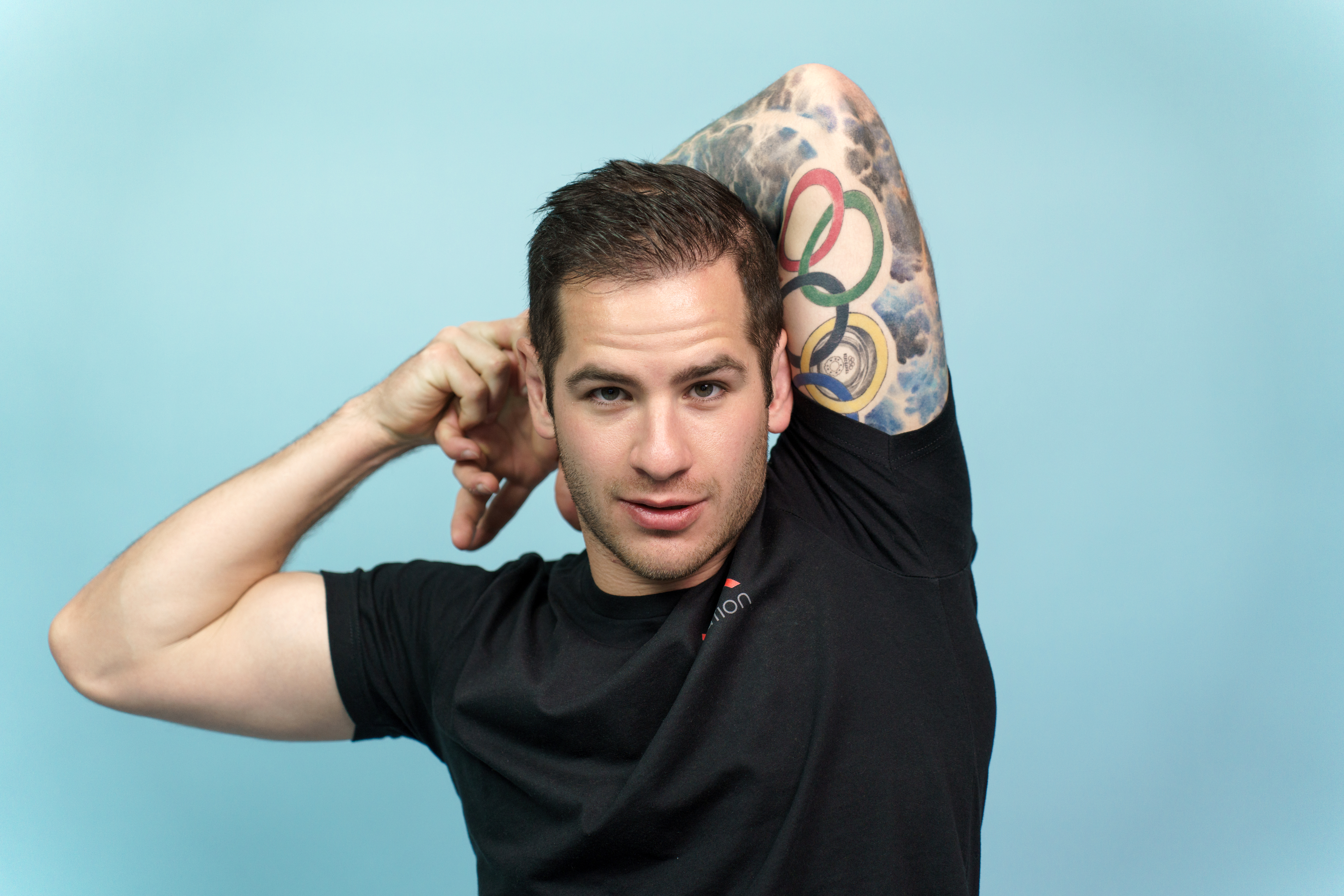
- Bida in 2023

Personal information
- Native name: Сергей Олегович•Бида
- Full name: Sergey Olegovich Bida
- Born: February 13, 1993 (age 33) Moscow, Russia
- Height: 1.95 m (6 ft 5 in)
- Weight: 93 kg (205 lb)

Fencing career
- Sport: Fencing
- Country: Russian
- Weapon: Épée
- Hand: left-handed
- Club: Bida Fencing Academy, California, USA
- Highest ranking: 1
- FIE ranking: current ranking
Medal record
Men's fencing
Representing (Russia) ROC
Olympic Games
Silver medal – second place	2020 Tokyo	Team épée
Representing Russia
World Championships
Silver medal – second place	2019 Budapest	Individual épée
Bronze medal – third place	2018 Wuxi	Team épée
European Championships
Gold medal – first place	2017 Tbilisi	Team épée
Gold medal – first place	2018 Novi-Sad	Team épée
Gold medal – first place	2019 Düsseldorf	Team épée
Bronze medal – third place	2014 Strasbourg	Team épée
European Games
Silver medal – second place	2015 Baku	Team épée
Summer Universiade
Gold medal – first place	2017 Taipei	Individual épée
Gold medal – first place	2017 Taipei	Team épée

Sergey Olegovich Bida (Russian: Сергей Олегович Бида, IPA: [sʲɪrˈɡʲej ˈbʲidə]; born 13 February 1993) is a Russian left-handed épée fencer. He was ranked #1 in the world in 2019 and 2020. He is a three-time European épée team champion, and 2021 Olympic épée team silver medalist. He moved to the United States in June 2023, along with his wife, Olympic épée fencer Violetta Bida. Bida is a member of USA Fencing.

== Education ==
Bida studied Sports Studies at the Russian State University of Physical Education, Sport, Youth and Tourism in Moscow.

== Fencing career ==
=== Russia ===
==== 2012–19; World championship silver medal ====
Bida began fencing at 13 years of age, and his club before he left Russia was Dynamo Moscow. At the April 2012 Junior World Championship in Moscow, he won a bronze medal in individual épée. At the March 2013 Junior European Épée Championships in Toruń, Poland, he won a silver medal in team épée. At the June 2013 European Under-23 Championships in Budapest, Hungary, he won bronze medals in individual épée and team épée.

At the 2014 European Fencing Championships in Strasbourg, France, Bida won a bronze medal in team épée. At the 2015 European Games in Baku, Azerbaijan, he won a silver medal in team épée.

At the 2017 Summer Universiade in Tapei, Taiwan, Bida won gold medals in both individual épée and team épée. At the 2017 European Fencing Championships in Tbilisi, Georgia, in June, he won a gold medal in team épée.

At the 2018 European Fencing Championships in Novi Sad, Serbia, in June, he won a gold medal in team épée. At the 2018 World Fencing Championships in Wuxi, China, in July, Bida won a bronze medal in team épée.

In March 2019 at the Buenos Aires Fencing World Cup in Argentina, Bida won the gold medal in individual épée. At the 2019 European Fencing Championships in Düsseldorf, Germany, in June, he won a gold medal in team épée.

At the 2019 World Fencing Championships in Budapest, Hungary, in July, Bida won the individual silver medal in the épée tournament, losing only to Gergely Siklósi of Hungary.

In 2019, Bida was given the title Honoured Master of Sport by the Russian Federation. He was named the 2019 Male Fencer of the Year by the Russian Federation.

==== 2019–23; World #1, Olympic silver medal ====
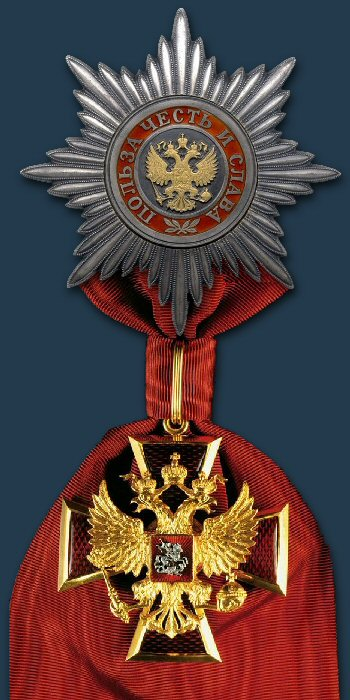
Order "For Merit to the Fatherland" first class

Bida was ranked # 1 in the world in men's épée in 2019 and 2020. At the January 2020 Fencing Grand Prix in Doha, Qatar, he was the top seed and won the gold medal in individual épée defeating 2019 French team world champion Alexandre Bardenet 15–6 in the final, and that same month at the Heidenheim World Cup in Germany, he won a bronze medal in individual épée. At the February 2020 Vancouver World Cup in Canada, he won a silver medal in individual épée.

In July 2021 at the Olympics in Tokyo, Bida won a silver medal in team épée, and came in fifth in individual épée (losing only to gold medal winner Romain Cannone of France).

In recognition of his achievements at the Tokyo Olympics, Bida received the Order "For Merit to the Fatherland" first class from the president of the Russian Federation. It was awarded to him by Russian president Vladimir Putin. In January 2023, he won the All-Russian competition in Moscow. Up until the time he left Russia, he was paid a salary for being a member of the Russian national fencing team.

=== United States ===
==== 2023; US Summer National Championships gold medal ====
In May 2023 Bida left Russia and moved to the United States to embark in a career there, joining the AFM (Academy of Fencing Masters) Coaching Team in northern California. He informed his Russian authorities including the management at his club Dynamo and the Russian Fencing Federation that he was ending his sports career in Russia, and their response was "okay, good luck."

He is both coaching and competing in the United States, as is his wife Olympic épée fencer Violetta Bida. As to his coaching young boys and girls at his new club, he said: "At first, the children started off a little bit shy, but it's OK because I was also a little bit shy." The couple now lives in a one-bedroom apartment, as they await the birth of their first child, and teach children at the local fencing club. He and his wife join Konstantin Lokhanov as Olympic fencers who left Russia to go to the United States after the 2022 Russian invasion of Ukraine.

In 2023, USA Fencing granted Russians living in the United States the right to compete in American competitions as neutral athletes, if they sign a public declaration against the Russian invasion of Ukraine. On the Fourth of July weekend, Bida won a gold medal in the team men's épée competition at the United States Summer National Championships, in which 60 men's épée teams competed.

The reaction of the Russian Fencing Federation changed dramatically once Bida publicly denounced Russia's invasion of Ukraine, and followed that up by winning a gold medal at the U.S. Summer National Championships. Embarrassed and angered, a few days later the Russian Fencing Federation fired the Bidas' former coach, the highly regarded Russian national épée team head coach Alexander Glazunov -- "due to the flight of his athletes to the United States without the consent" of the Russian Fencing Federation. When asked about his firing, the coach said: "I don't know why I'm responsible. It’s better to ask the [Russian Fencing Federation]." The Sports Examiner commented: "This story is almost too strange to be true."

On December 27, 2023, the Russian state-run newspaper Pravda reported that Bida and his wife had been put on the Russian Ministry of Internal Affairs "wanted list for escaping to USA." While Russia issued warrants for the couple's arrest, Pravda reported that it was unclear what Russian criminal code the Russian government had accused the Bidas of violating. At the same time, the Russian press wrote that the fencers faced up to 10 years in prison in Russia.

==== 2024–present ====
Days later, the United States Olympic & Paralympic Committee (USOPC) and USA Fencing both wrote letters in support of Bida, his wife, and Lokhanov being granted U.S. citizenship. USOPC CEO Sarah Hirshland wrote as to the fencers, in a January 4, 2024, letter: "Our intention in endorsing their cause is to enable them to proudly represent our remarkable nation in the upcoming 2024 Olympic Games and other forthcoming international competitions." Phil Andrews, the CEO of USA Fencing, wrote in a January 5, 2024, letter to the U.S. Congress: "All 3 of these individuals have made sacrifices at great personal cost, and put their lives at risk to be able to represent our nation, and we ask you to make every effort to support them in the extraordinary circumstance." Bida expressed surprise about getting the letters of support from the USOPC and USA Fencing for U.S. citizenship, saying: "This kind of letter, it’s impossible in Russia." Bida said he and his wife would be "honored" to become an American citizen, adding "We will feel happy and thankful to spend our lives here."

Shortly after the support of the USOPC and USA Fencing for the defecting fencers to obtain U.S. citizenship was made public, Sergey Malinkovich, the chairman of the Central Committee of the Communists of Russia party, crudely threatened the fencers by sending them a portrait of Leon Trotsky. Trotsky had also emigrated decades earlier, and was assassinated by a Soviet agent in Mexico in 1940. Malinkovich noted: "everyone knows how it ended." He added: "I also urge the Russian special services to form an excellent team of fencers and ensure their participation in the competition in which the traitor Bida will participate." Russian State Duma deputy Vitaly Milonov called the fencers "cowards, traitors, and defectors" and "political rags.' Russian Olympic Committee President Stanislav Pozdnyakov said: "they were promised to be treated with some sweet cookies. The most important thing is that they don’t choke on them." Soviet-Russian former four-time Olympic champion biathlete Alexander Tikhonov called the Bidas traitors to Russia. Yelena Välbe, the head of the Russian Cross-Country Skiing Federation, said about the three fencers: "It's shameful to run ... We have to be patriots." Other Russian officials also pledged that there would be consequences. Pravda shed light on the Russian officials' reaction, writing: "It is difficult to overestimate the propaganda value of sports, but "defectors" influence public opinion no less."

Bida is a member of USA Fencing. As of January 2024, he was among the few Russian athletes world-wide who had come out as staunchly against Russia’s invasion; while other Russian athletes have spoken about their general desire for peace, most stopped short of criticizing Russia's war. In 2024, while being interviewed in California he said: “Here I feel more free. I breathe more free.”

== Personal life ==
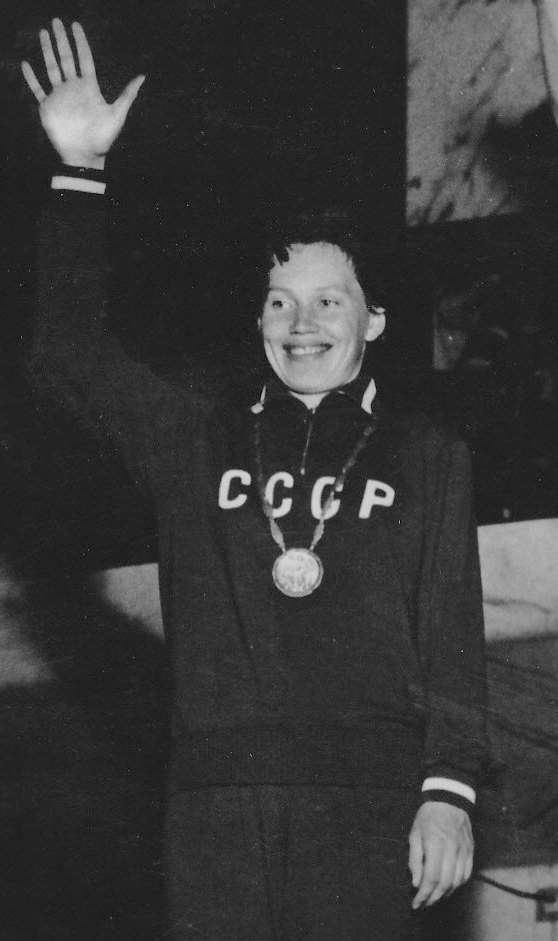
Bida's maternal grandmother, Ukrainian Valentina Rastvorova, 1958 world women's foil champion.

Bida's maternal grandmother, Valentina Rastvorova, was a Soviet Ukrainian-born fencer who was the 1958 World Women's Foil individual champion, and won team gold and individual silver in women's foil in the 1960 Summer Olympics in Rome. She later won team silver in the 1964 Summer Olympics in Tokyo. Bida's maternal grandfather, Boris Grishin, was a water polo player who won Olympic silver in the 1968 Summer Olympics in Mexico City, and Olympic bronze in the 1964 Olympics in Tokyo.

His mother is Yelena Grishina, a two-time finalist in Olympic foil, in the 1988 Summer Olympics in Seoul and the 1992 Summer Olympics in Barcelona. His maternal uncle, Yevgeny Grishin, won Olympic water polo gold in the 1980 Summer Olympics in Moscow, and water polo bronze in the 1988 Summer Olympics in Seoul.

Bida was originally set to follow in his grandfather and uncle's footsteps in competitive water polo; however, he contracted a severe case of sinusitis when he was 12 years old that prevented him from getting in the pool. He took up épée instead, at 13 years of age—late, by Russian standards, as he was too old to begin in other sports.

His first marriage ended in divorce in early June 2021. His wife Violetta also fences épée, and they met initially as kids at fencing training camps. At the time she mostly found him annoying, and she jokes now: "Some days, I remember how I hated him." They married in February 2023. She is a three-time Junior World Champion, a silver medalist in both the Senior World and European Championships, and a Tokyo Olympian.

Commenting on the influence of his parents and Violetta's parents on their lives, Sergey said: "We've been competitive all our lives. We're alive when we compete. All of the things that our parents gave to us, and their experiences, we are using right now. There is always one more rock to climb."

== Medal record ==
=== Olympic Games ===
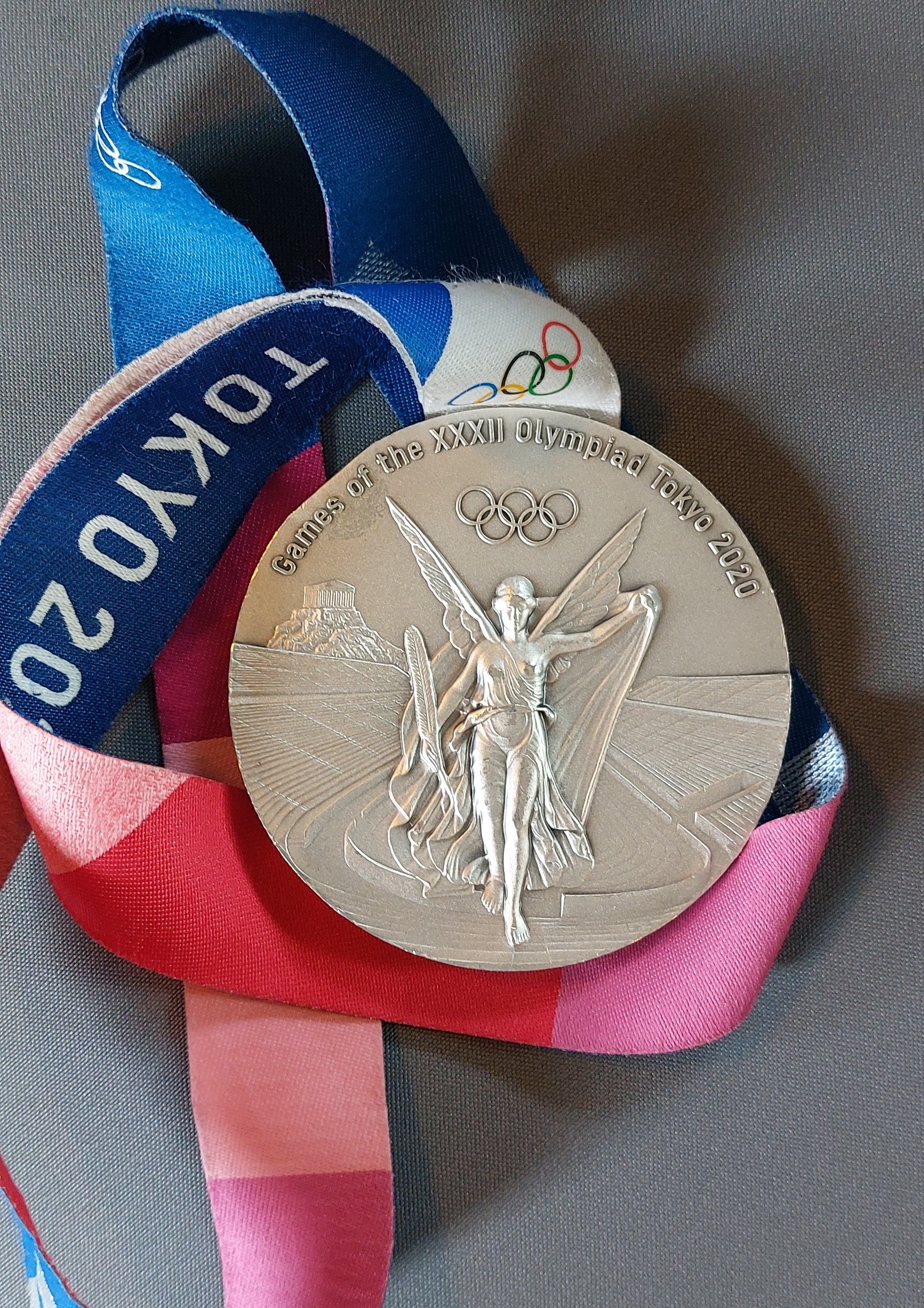
Tokyo Olympic Games silver medal

Year	Location	Event	Position
2021	Tokyo, Japan	Team Men's Épée	2nd

=== World Championship ===
Year	Location	Event	Position
2018	Wuxi, China	Team Men's Épée	3rd
2019	Budapest, Hungary	Individual Men's Épée	2nd

=== European Championship ===
Year	Location	Event	Position
2014	Strasbourg, France	Team Men's Épée	3rd
2017	(Georgia (country)) Tbilisi, Georgia	Team Men's Épée	1st
2018	Novi Sad, Serbia	Team Men's Épée	1st
2019	Düsseldorf, Germany	Team Men's Épée	1st

=== Grand Prix ===
Date	Location	Event	Position
01/24/2020	Doha, Qatar	Individual Men's Épée	1st

=== World Cup ===
Date	Location	Event	Position
03/22/2019	Buenos Aires, Argentina	Individual Men's Épée	1st
01/09/2020	Heidenheim, Germany	Individual Men's Épée	3rd
02/07/2020	Vancouver, Canada	Individual Men's Épée	2nd

== See also ==
- Krystsina Tsimanouskaya, Belarusian Olympic sprinter who defected to Poland.
