= Katrina Smith Taylor =

British épée fencer

Personal information
- Born: April 23, 1991 (age 35) Truro, Cornwall

Fencing career
- Sport: Fencing
- Country: Great Britain
- Weapon: Épée
- Hand: right-handed
- Club: Liverpool Fencing Club
- Head coach: Atanas Atanasov
- FIE ranking: current ranking
Medal record
FIE Satellite
Bronze medal – third place	2015 London	Individual
Bronze medal – third place	2016 London	Individual
Bronze medal – third place	2017 Sheffield	Individual
Commonwealth Championships
Silver medal – second place	2018 Canberra	Individual
Gold medal – first place	2018 Canberra	Team
Bronze medal – third place	2022 London	Team

Katrina Smith Taylor (born 23 April 1991) is a British épée fencer. She moved from Cornwall to Liverpool in 2012. Smith Taylor has been a firefighter at Merseyside Fire and Rescue Service since 2016.

Smith Taylor finished 20th at the 2019 European Fencing Championships in Düsseldorf, Germany. In addition, she has competed for Great Britain at multiple World Championships, European Championships, Grand Prix, World Cups and Satellites, winning three medals in her career.
