= 2015 World Cadets and Juniors Fencing Championships =

2015 Junior World Fencing Championships
- Dates: 5–9 April
- Host city: Tashkent, Uzbekistan
- Venue: Tashkent Tennis Centre
- Events: 12

The 2015 Junior World Fencing Championships were held in Tashkent, Uzbekistan at the Tashkent Tennis Centre from 5 to 9 April.

== Medal summary ==
=== Men's events ===
Event	Gold	Silver	Bronze
Épée	Hippolyte Bouillot (FRA)	Zsombor Bányai (HUN)	Yulen Pereira (SPA); Xue Yangdong (CHN)
Foil	Damiano Rosatelli (ITA)	Francesco Ingargiola (ITA)	Huang Mengkai (CHN); Yang Hyeon-jun (KOR)
Sabre	Eli Dershwitz (USA)	Francesco Bonsanto (ITA)	Jules-Émile De Visscher (BEL); Mohammed Amer (EGY)
Team Épée	Germany; Rico Braun; Lukas Bellmann; Peter Bitsch; Samuel Unterhauser	France; Nelson Lopez-Pourtier; Clément Dorigo; Hippolyte Bouillot; Romain Cannone	Hungary; Zsombor Bányai; Sándor Cho Taeun; Patrik Esztergályos; Gergely Siklósi
Team Foil	Italy; Damiano Rosatelli; Francesco Ingargiola; Tommaso Ciuti; Lorenzo Francella	China; Chen Jingfeng; Huang Mengkai; Lu Chenjie	France; Maximilien Chastanet; Enguerrand Roger; Alexandre Sido; Erwann Auclin
Team Sabre	South Korea; Cho Han-shin; Kim Soo-hwan; Lee Jong-hyun	Russia; Iliy Andreev; Dmitriy Danilenko; Rostislav Krasilnikov	United States; Eli Dershwitz; Andrew Mackiewicz; Jonah Shainberg; Calvin Liang

=== Women's events ===
Event	Gold	Silver	Bronze
Épée	Coraline Vitalis (FRA)	Nadine Stahlberg (GER)	Qin Xue (CHN); Yuliya Svystil (UKR)
Foil	Sara Taffel (USA)	Eleanor Harvey (CAN)	Leonie Ebert (GER); Fu Yiting (CHN)
Sabre	Caroline Quéroli (FRA)	Manon Brunet (FRA)	Sage Palmedo (USA); Anna Bashta (RUS)
Team Épée	Italy; Alice Clerici; Eleonora De Marchi; Nicol Foietta; Roberta Marzani	Russia; Viktoria Kuzmenkova; Alina Bagaeva; Alena Komarova; Daria Filina	Germany; Nadine Stahlberg; Anna Hornischer; Alexandra Ehler; Kristin Werner
Team Foil	Italy; Elisabetta Bianchin; Claudia Borella; Erica Cipressa; Camilla Rivano	United States; Iman Blow; Sabrina Massialas; Megan Partridge; Sara Taffel	Poland; Julia Walczyk; Anna Szymczak; Marika Chrzanowska; Martyna Długosz
Team Sabre	Italy; Sofia Ciaraglia; Chiara Mormile; Eloisa Passaro; Rebecca Gargano	Russia; Valeria Bolshakova; Anna Bashta; Yana Obvintseva; Svetlana Sheveleva	Hungary; Anna Márton; Mirabella Kelecsényi; Petra Záhonyi; Borbála Papp

== Medal table ==
Rank	Nation	Gold	Silver	Bronze	Total
1	Italy	5	2	0	7
2	France	3	2	1	6
3	United States	2	1	2	5
4	Germany	1	1	2	4
5	South Korea	1	0	1	2
6	Russia	0	3	1	4
7	China	0	1	4	5
8	Hungary	0	1	2	3
9	Canada	0	1	0	1
10	Belgium	0	0	1	1
10	Egypt	0	0	1	1
10	Poland	0	0	1	1
10	Spain	0	0	1	1
10	Ukraine	0	0	1	1
Totals (14 entries)		12	12	18	42
