= Romain Cannone =

French épée fencer

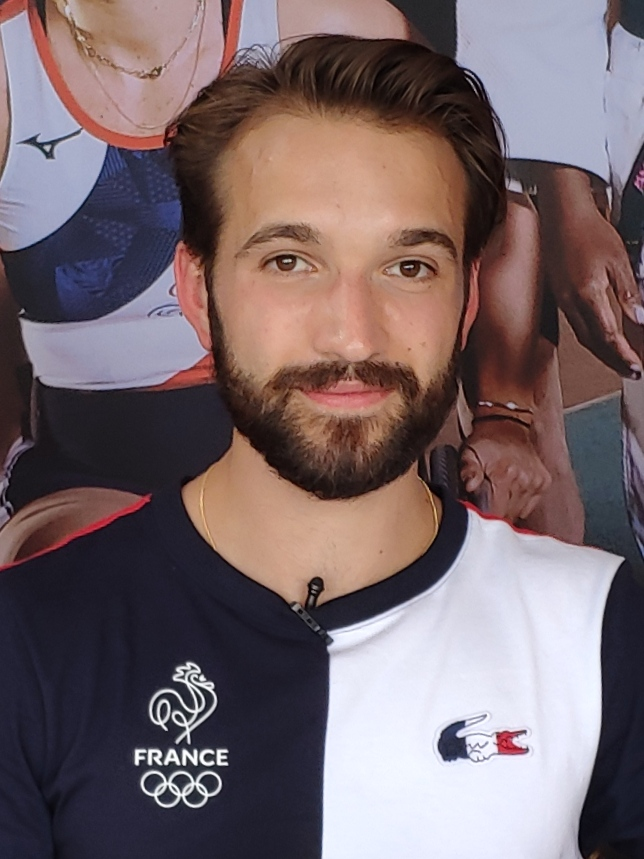
- Cannone in 2021

Personal information
- Born: 12 April 1997 (age 29) Boulogne-Billancourt, France
- Height: 1.77 m (5 ft 10 in)

Fencing career
- Sport: Fencing
- Country: France
- Weapon: Épée
- Hand: right-handed
- Club: VGA escrime (Val-de-Marne, France)
- Former coach: Michael Mokretsov
- FIE ranking: 52
Medal record
Men's épée
Representing France
Olympic Games
Gold medal – first place	2020 Tokyo	Individual
World Championships
Gold medal – first place	2022 Cairo	Individual
Gold medal – first place	2022 Cairo	Team
Silver medal – second place	2023 Milan	Team
Bronze medal – third place	2023 Milan	Individual
European Championships
Gold medal – first place	2024 Basel	Team
Bronze medal – third place	2022 Antalya	Team
Junior World Championships
Silver medal – second place	2015 Tashkent	Team
Mediterranean Games
Silver medal – second place	2018 Tarragona	Individual

Romain Cannone (born 12 April 1997) is a French right-handed épée fencer, 2022 team world champion, 2022 individual world champion, and 2021 individual Olympic champion.

After winning gold in individual men's épée at the 2020 Tokyo Olympic Games and the 2022 World Fencing Championships in Cairo, Egypt, Cannone became the first person to win back-to-back world titles in individual men's épée since Pavel Kolobkov's world titles in 1993 and 1994.

He was named Sportsperson of the Year for 2020 in Colmar, France.

== Career ==
Canonne was born in France, but moved to Brazil with his family while in kindergarten. He moved with his family to New York City's Lower East Side while still young, and began fencing there at the age of 12, subsequently training under Michael Mokretsov at the age of 13 at the New York Fencing Academy in Coney Island. In 2019, Cannone ranked 30th in the Individual Men's épée World Championships in Budapest. Prior to his gold medal in the 2020 Tokyo Olympics, his highest ranking was 7th place at the Vancouver World Cup on 8 February 2019. As of 2019, when Cannone qualified for the Olympics, he was a student at Skema Business School.

=== 2020 Olympics ===
Cannone, originally only scheduled as a replacement athlete, was the youngest member of the 2020 French team. However, on 18 June 2021, when team member Daniel Jérent was removed from the team for a failed drug test, Cannone was selected to take his place. On 25 July 2021, he defeated the Russian Sergey Bida in the quarter-finals (15–12) and the Ukrainian Ihor Reizlin (15–10) in the semi-finals, and went on to win the gold medal (15–10) against the previous world champion Gergely Siklósi. Cannone's win has been described as "surprising" being his first international medal in individual competition. He became the first French Olympic champion in individual fencing since Brice Guyart won the gold medal in foil in 2004.

== Medal record ==
=== Olympic Games ===
Year	Location	Event	Position
2021	Tokyo, Japan	Individual Men's Épée	1st

=== World Championship ===
Year	Location	Event	Position
2022	Cairo, Egypt	Individual Men's Épée	1st
2022	Cairo, Egypt	Team Men's Épée	1st
2023	Milan, Italy	Individual Men's Épée	3rd
2023	Milan, Italy	Team Men's Épée	2nd

=== European Championship ===
Year	Location	Event	Position
2022	Antalya, Turkey	Team Men's Épée	3rd

=== World Cup ===
Date	Location	Event	Position
2021-11-19	Bern, Switzerland	Individual Men's Épée	3rd
2022-02-11	Sochi, Russia	Individual Men's Épée	2nd
2022-05-12	Heidenheim, Germany	Individual Men's Épée	1st
2023-03-25	Buenos Aires, Argentina	Individual Men's Épée	3rd
2024-03-22	(Georgia (country)) Tbilisi, Georgia	Individual Men's Épée	1st
