= Yuval Freilich =

Israeli fencer (born 1995)

Yuval Shalom Freilich יובל פרייליך
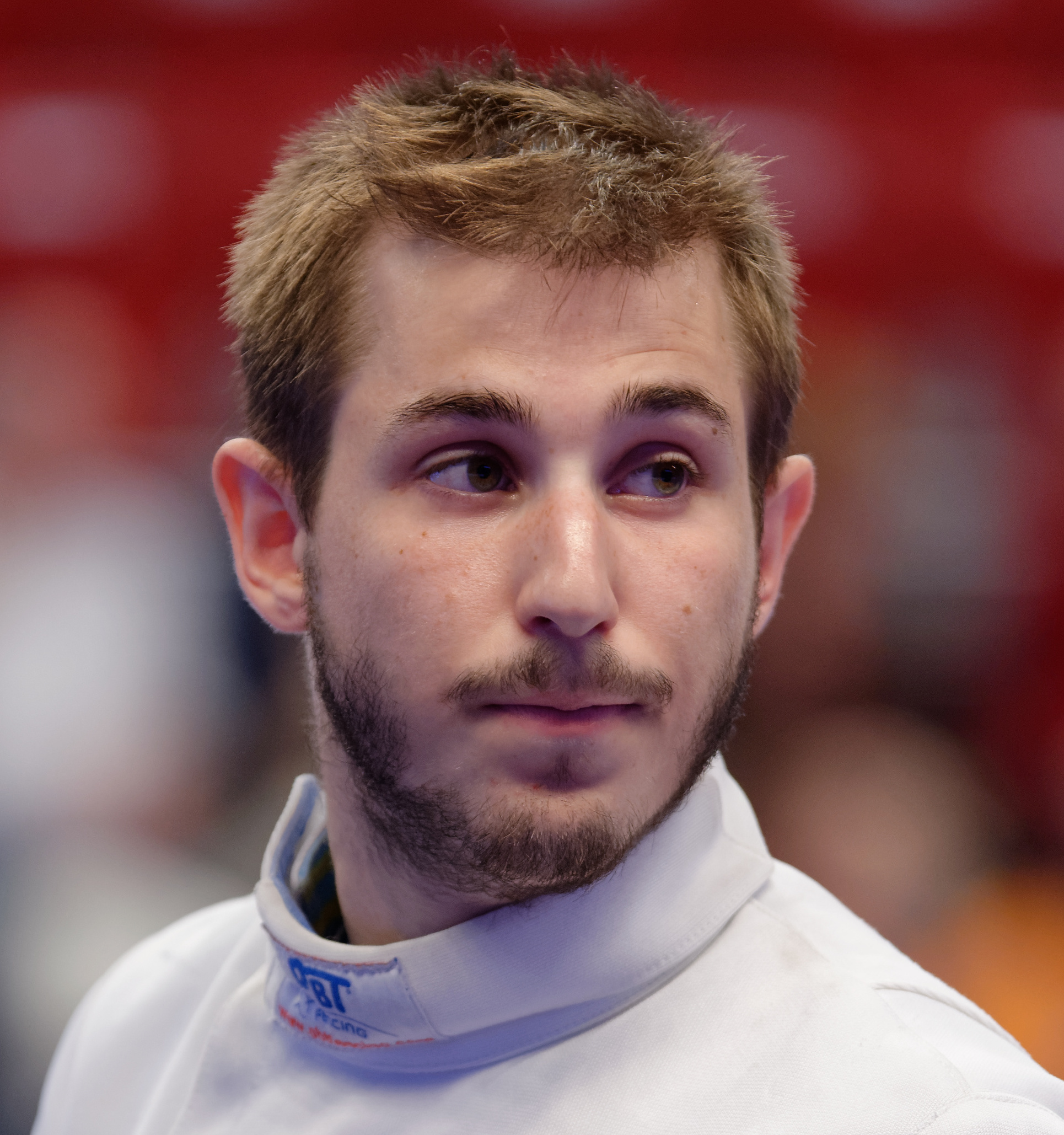
- Freilich, 2016

Personal information
- Born: 24 January 1995 (age 31) Neve Daniel, Israel

Fencing career
- Sport: Fencing
- Country: Israel
- Weapon: épée
- Hand: left-handed
- National coach: Angelo Mazzoni
- Club: Hapoel Kfar Saba
- Former coach: Ohad Balva and Alexander Ivanov
- FIE ranking: current ranking
Medal record
Men's fencing
Representing Israel
European Championships
Gold medal – first place	2019 Düsseldorf	Individual Epee
Silver medal – second place	2022 Antalya	Team Epee
World Junior Fencing Championships
Gold medal – first place	2014 Plovdiv	Individual épée
Gold medal – first place	2015 Maribor	Individual épée
European Junior Fencing Championships
Gold medal – first place	2014 Jerusalem	Individual épée
Gold medal – first place	2015 Maribor	Individual épée
World Cadet Fencing Championships
Bronze medal – third place	2010 Baku	Individual épée
Gold medal – first place	2012 Moscow	Individual épée
European Cadet Fencing Championships
Gold medal – first place	2011 Klangenfurt	Individual épée

Yuval Shalom Freilich (Hebrew: יובל פרייליך; born 24 January 1995) is an Israeli left-handed épée fencer, ranked 9th in the world in 2023–24. In both 2014 and 2015 Freilich won the European Men's Épée Junior Championship. He won the individual épée gold medal at the 2019 European Fencing Championships, the épée team silver medal with Israel at the 2022 European Fencing Championships, and the gold medal at the 2024 Épée Grand Prix event in Qatar.

Freilich represented Israel at the 2024 Paris Olympics in men's épée, and came in 19th.

== Early life ==
Freilich was born in Israel and is an Orthodox Jew, and grew up in a religious observant Jewish family. The family lived in Gush Etzion in the settlement of Neve Daniel, south of Jerusalem, and in the moshav Havatzelet HaSharon in central Israel. His parents Gabby (a radiologist) and Rachel Freilich had emigrated to Israel from Sydney, Australia, and he has three brothers and two sisters; he is the second-youngest of the six siblings. He grew up loving dancing, and especially tap dancing. He is the nephew of former Organisation of Rabbis of Australasia president Rabbi Dovid Freilich.

In 2000, when Freilich was a child, his family moved to Australia, where he lived for five years and attended Moriah College primary school, but then settled to Israel in 2004 and later attended Hartman High School in Jerusalem. He served as a soldier in the Israel Defense Forces, and trained at the Wingate Institute. He found that, as an athlete, his three years of compulsory military service slowed his progress in fencing because it limited his time considerably, and took a "mental and energetic toll." He later attended Open University of Israel in Netanya, Israel, studying law, and IDC Herzliya (now known as Reichman University), where he double majored in Law and Government and was later inducted into the Reichman University Sports Hall of Fame.

== Fencing career ==
=== Early years ===
Freilich began fencing at the age of eight. He became interested in fencing after seeing it in the 2000 OIympics. His coach starting in 2009 was Ohad Balva, he was laterd coached by Alexander Ivanov, and he is now coached by Angelo Mazzoni), and his club is Hapoel Kfar Saba. In a typical week, he has four or five lessons with a coach, three fitness sessions, and three or four fencing training sessions of up to an hour and a half.

=== 2010–13; World Cadet champion and European Cadet champion ===
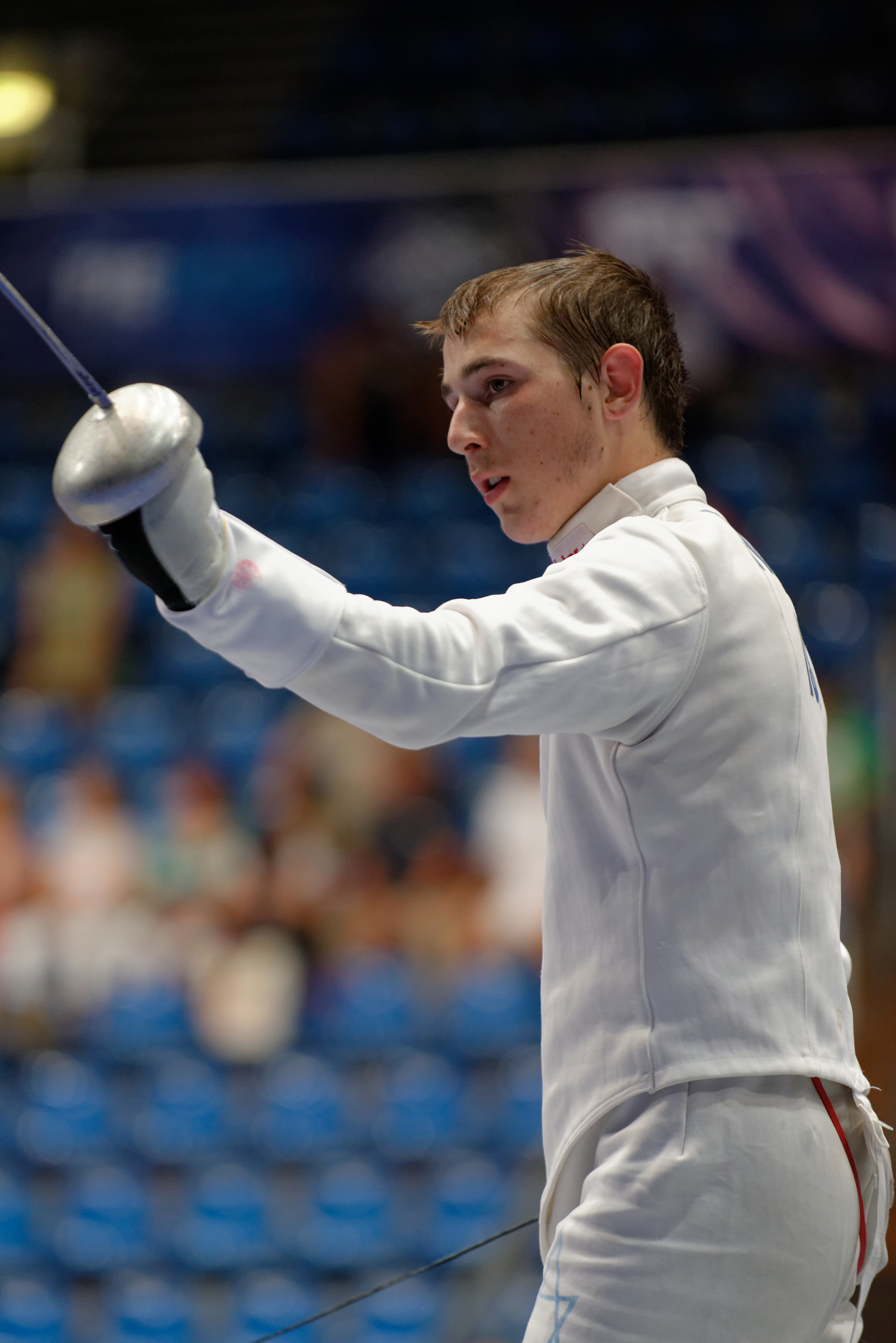
Yuval Freilich, 2013

In April 2010, at 15 years of age and younger than many of his opponents, he won a bronze medal in the men's épée 2010 World Cadet Fencing Championship in Baku, Azerbaijan. In 2010 he was named one of the Top 10 U-20 Israeli Athletes, by Israeli news website Ynet.

In 2011 he won the European Cadet Championship, in Klagenfurt, Austria. In 2011–12, he was ranked 2nd in the world among junior épée fencers.

In 2012 at 17 years of age Freilich won the men's épée 2012 World Cadet Fencing Championship in Moscow, Russia, and became the #1-ranked épée cadet in the world. Also that year, in Croatia, he led the Israeli team to a gold medal in the European Team Championships. In March 2012, he won a bronze medal in the junior championship of Europe, in Poreč, Croatia. In addition, in December 2012 he won a bronze medal in the junior épée Young Lions World Cup in Espoo, Finland, behind Sergey Bida and Lorenzo Buzzi, in a competition with 170 fencers.

=== 2014–15; 2x European Junior champion, and #1 ranked junior epee fencer in the world ===
In January 2014, he won the gold medal at the junior épée Alpe Adria World Cup in Udine, Italy, in a competition with 147 fencers.

In March 2014 Freilich won the European Men's Épée Junior Championship in Jerusalem, Israel, in a competition with 254 fencers.

In April 2014 Freilich came in 6th at the World Men's Épée Junior Championships in Plovdiv, Bulgaria, in a competition with 114 fencers.

In November 2014 he won the junior épée Mémorial de Martinengo World Cup in Tallinn, Estonia, in a competition with 254 fencers.

In March 2015 Freilich again won the European Men's Épée Junior Championship, this time in Maribor, Slovenia, in a competition with 115 fencers. In 2015 he was the #1 ranked junior épée fencer in the world.

=== 2016–present; European champion ===
In February 2016 he won a Men's Épée bronze medal at the Peter Bakonyi World Cup in Vancouver, Canada, in a competition with 192 fencers.

In May 2018, he won a silver medal in individual men's épée at the Coppa Citta di Lugano in Lugano, Switzerland.

On June 18, 2019, Freilich won Israel's first European fencing title in the men's individual épée tournament at the 2019 European Fencing Championships in Düsseldorf, Germany. Israel's first European medal had been won by Noam Mills, who won a women's individual épée bronze medal in Leipzig, Germany, in 2010.

In May 2020, he said that due to the impact of the COVID-19 pandemic in Israel which prevented him from fencing, he put more effort into physical preparation and mental training. He turned his garden into his own private gym, and trained twice a day, including exercises such as yoga and meditation that he wouldn't usually do during the regular season.

On June 22, 2022, he won the épée team silver medal with Israel at the 2022 European Fencing Championships in Antalya, Turkey.

In January 2024, Freilich won the gold medal at the 2024 Épée Grand Prix event in Doha, Qatar, in an event with 276 fencers. He did so in the Arab country that does not have diplomatic ties with Israel, while wearing a fencing uniform with an Israeli flag. He was the first Israeli to win a fencing Grand Prix. After he won, the Israeli national anthem was played during the podium ceremony. At the time, he was ranked #8 in the world in men's épée.

=== 2024 Paris Olympics ===
Freilich represented Israel at the 2024 Paris Olympics in Men's épée, and came in 19th after being eliminated by former European champion Andrea Santarelli of Italy. He was the first Israeli man to qualify in épée for an Olympics.

== Medal record ==
=== European Championship ===
Year	Location	Event	Position
2019	Düsseldorf, Germany	Individual Men's Épée	1st
2022	Antalya, Turkey	Team Men's Épée	2nd

=== World Cup ===
Date	Location	Event	Position
2016-02-12	Vancouver, Canada	Individual Men's Épée	3rd

=== Grand Prix ===
Date	Location	Event	Position
2024-01-31	Doha, Qatar	Individual Men's Épée	1st

== See also ==
- List of select Jewish fencers
- Sports in Israel
