= 2019 European Fencing Championships =

- Host city: (Germany) Düsseldorf
- Dates: 17–22 June
- Main venue: Messe Düsseldorf
- Website: www.madeofsteel2019.de

The 2019 European Fencing Championships was held in Düsseldorf, Germany from 17 to 22 June 2019 at the Messe Düsseldorf hall 8b.

== Schedule ==
●	Opening Ceremony	●	Finals	●	Closing Ceremony

June	17	18	19	20	21	22	Total
Ceremonies	●					●	
Foil Individual	Men	Women					2
Épée Individual		Men	Women				2
Sabre Individual	Women		Men				2
Foil Team				Men	Women		2
Épée Team					Men	Women	2
Sabre Team				Women		Men	2
Total Gold Medals	2	2	2	2	2	2	12

== Medal summary ==
=== Men's events ===
Event	Gold	Silver	Bronze
Foil	Alessio Foconi; Italy	Daniele Garozzo; Italy	Enzo Lefort; France
Foil	Alessio Foconi; Italy	Daniele Garozzo; Italy	Aleksey Cheremisinov; Russia
Épée	Yuval Freilich; Israel	Andrea Santarelli; Italy	Enrico Garozzo; Italy
Épée	Yuval Freilich; Israel	Andrea Santarelli; Italy	Jiří Beran; Czech Republic
Sabre	Veniamin Reshetnikov; Russia	Kamil Ibragimov; Russia	Max Hartung; Germany
Sabre	Veniamin Reshetnikov; Russia	Kamil Ibragimov; Russia	Sandro Bazadze; Georgia
Team Foil	France; Erwann Le Péchoux; Enzo Lefort; Julien Mertine; Maxime Pauty	Germany; Peter Joppich; Benjamin Kleibrink; Luis Klein; André Sanità	Italy; Giorgio Avola; Andrea Cassarà; Alessio Foconi; Daniele Garozzo
Team Épée	Russia; Sergey Bida; Nikita Glazkov; Sergey Khodos; Pavel Sukhov	Denmark; Patrick Jørgensen; Kenneth Knudsen; Troels Robl; Frederik von der Osten	Hungary; Dániel Berta; Máté Koch; András Rédli; Gergely Siklósi
Team Sabre	Germany; Max Hartung; Björn Hübner-Fehrer; Matyas Szabo; Benedikt Wagner	Hungary; Tamás Decsi; Csanád Gémesi; András Szatmári; Áron Szilágyi	Italy; Enrico Berrè; Luca Curatoli; Aldo Montano; Luigi Samele

=== Women's events ===
Event	Gold	Silver	Bronze
Foil	Elisa Di Francisca; Italy	Inna Deriglazova; Russia	Alice Volpi; Italy
Foil	Elisa Di Francisca; Italy	Inna Deriglazova; Russia	Ysaora Thibus; France
Épée	Coraline Vitalis; France	Marie-Florence Candassamy; France	Alexandra Ndolo; Germany
Épée	Coraline Vitalis; France	Marie-Florence Candassamy; France	Ewa Trzebińska; Poland
Sabre	Olha Kharlan; Ukraine	Manon Brunet; France	Sofya Velikaya; Russia
Sabre	Olha Kharlan; Ukraine	Manon Brunet; France	Anna Márton; Hungary
Team Foil	Russia; Inna Deriglazova; Anastasia Ivanova; Larisa Korobeynikova; Adelina Zagidullina	France; Anita Blaze; Solène Butruille; Pauline Ranvier; Ysaora Thibus	Italy; Elisa Di Francisca; Arianna Errigo; Francesca Palumbo; Alice Volpi
Team Épée	Poland; Renata Knapik-Miazga; Magdalena Piekarska; Ewa Trzebińska; Aleksandra Zamachowska	Russia; Tatyana Andryushina; Violetta Khrapina; Violetta Kolobova; Lyubov Shutova	Italy; Alice Clerici; Rossella Fiamingo; Federica Isola; Mara Navarria
Team Sabre	Russia; Yana Egorian; Olga Nikitina; Sofia Pozdniakova; Sofya Velikaya	Hungary; Renáta Katona; Luca László; Anna Márton; Liza Pusztai	France; Cécilia Berder; Manon Brunet; Charlotte Lembach; Caroline Quéroli

== Medal table ==
* Host nation (Germany)

Rank	Nation	Gold	Silver	Bronze	Total
1	Russia (RUS)	4	3	2	9
2	France (FRA)	2	3	3	8
3	Italy (ITA)	2	2	6	10
4	Germany (GER)*	1	1	2	4
5	Poland (POL)	1	0	1	2
6	Israel (ISR)	1	0	0	1
6	Ukraine (UKR)	1	0	0	1
8	Hungary (HUN)	0	2	2	4
9	Denmark (DEN)	0	1	0	1
10	Czech Republic (CZE)	0	0	1	1
10	Georgia (GEO)	0	0	1	1
Totals (11 entries)		12	12	18	42

== Results ==
=== Men ===
==== Foil individual ====
Position	Name	Country
1st place, gold medalist(s)	Alessio Foconi	Italy
2nd place, silver medalist(s)	Daniele Garozzo	Italy
3rd place, bronze medalist(s)	Enzo Lefort	France
3rd place, bronze medalist(s)	Aleksey Cheremisinov	Russia
5.	Maxime Pauty	France
6.	Alexander Choupenitch	Czech Republic
7.	Dmitry Zherebchenko	Russia
8.	Andrzej Rządkowski	Poland

Quarter-finals
(Poland) Andrzej Rządkowski	10
(Italy) Daniele Garozzo	15
(Czech Republic) Alexander Choupenitch	7
(France) Enzo Lefort	15
(France) Maxime Pauty	14
(Russia) Aleksey Cheremisinov	15
(Russia) Dmitry Zherebchenko	7
(Italy) Alessio Foconi	15

Semi-finals
(Italy) Daniele Garozzo	15
(France) Enzo Lefort	8
(Russia) Aleksey Cheremisinov	11
(Italy) Alessio Foconi	15

Final
(Italy) Daniele Garozzo	4
(Italy) Alessio Foconi	15

==== Épée individual ====
Position	Name	Country
1st place, gold medalist(s)	Yuval Freilich	Israel
2nd place, silver medalist(s)	Andrea Santarelli	Italy
3rd place, bronze medalist(s)	Enrico Garozzo	Italy
3rd place, bronze medalist(s)	Jiří Beran	Czech Republic
5.	Josef Mahringer	Austria
6.	Bohdan Nikishyn	Ukraine
7.	Tibor Andrásfi	Hungary
8.	Bas Verwijlen	Netherlands

Quarter-finals
(Austria) Josef Mahringer	11
(Italy) Enrico Garozzo	15
(Italy) Andrea Santarelli	15
(Hungary) Tibor Andrásfi	9
(Israel) Yuval Freilich	15
(Ukraine) Bohdan Nikishyn	12
(Czech Republic) Jiří Beran	15
(Netherlands) Bas Verwijlen	10

Semi-finals
(Italy) Enrico Garozzo	12
(Italy) Andrea Santarelli	15
(Israel) Yuval Freilich	15
(Czech Republic) Jiří Beran	8

Final
(Italy) Andrea Santarelli	9
(Israel) Yuval Freilich	15

==== Sabre individual ====
Position	Name	Country
1st place, gold medalist(s)	Veniamin Reshetnikov	Russia
2nd place, silver medalist(s)	Kamil Ibragimov	Russia
3rd place, bronze medalist(s)	Max Hartung	Germany
3rd place, bronze medalist(s)	Sandro Bazadze	Georgia
5.	Benedikt Wagner	Germany
6.	Enrico Berrè	Italy
7.	Boladé Apithy	France
8.	András Szatmári	Hungary

Quarter-finals
(France) Boladé Apithy	14
(Germany) Max Hartung	15
(Italy) Enrico Berrè	8
(Russia) Veniamin Reshetnikov	15
(Georgia (country)) Sandro Bazadze	15
(Hungary) András Szatmári	10
(Russia) Kamil Ibragimov	15
(Germany) Benedikt Wagner	8

Semi-finals
(Germany) Max Hartung	10
(Russia) Veniamin Reshetnikov	15
(Georgia (country)) Sandro Bazadze	11
(Russia) Kamil Ibragimov	15

Final
(Russia) Veniamin Reshetnikov	15
(Russia) Kamil Ibragimov	7

==== Foil team ====
Round of 16
Belgium	31
Ukraine	45
Germany	45
Spain	38
Israel	38
Poland	45
France	45
Netherlands	29
Ireland	23
Great Britain	45
Denmark	38
Hungary	45
Slovakia	29
Russia	45

Quarter-finals
Italy	45
Ukraine	28
Germany	45
Poland	39
France	45
Great Britain	25
Hungary	27
Russia	45

Semi-finals
Italy	40
Germany	45
France	45
Russia	29

Final
Germany	26
France	45
Third place
Italy	45
Russia	36

==== Épée team ====
Round of 16
Russia	45
Great Britain	22
Germany	45
Spain	36
Hungary	45
Czech Republic	26
Netherlands	21
Italy	31
France	42
Estonia	43
Poland	45
Spain	38
Ukraine	38
Denmark	40
Finland	37
Switzerland	45

Quarter-finals
Russia	36
Germany	26
Hungary	33
Italy	28
Estonia	45
Poland	30
Denmark	39
Switzerland	38

Semi-finals
Russia	24
Hungary	23
Estonia	32
Denmark	40

Final
Russia	31
Denmark	30
Third place
Hungary	36
Estonia	25

==== Sabre team ====
Round of 16
Belarus	34
Georgia	45
France	45
Spain	19
Belgium	31
Romania	45
Ukraine	38
Great Britain	45

Quarter-finals
Italy	45
Georgia	44
France	40
Germany	45
Russia	42
Romania	45
Great Britain	28
Hungary	45

Semi-finals
Italy	42
Germany	45
Romania	40
Hungary	45

Final
Germany	45
Hungary	43
Third place
Italy	45
Romania	35

=== Women ===
==== Foil individual ====
Position	Name	Country
1st place, gold medalist(s)	Elisa Di Francisca	Italy
2nd place, silver medalist(s)	Inna Deriglazova	Russia
3rd place, bronze medalist(s)	Ysaora Thibus	France
3rd place, bronze medalist(s)	Alice Volpi	Italy
5.	Larisa Korobeynikova	Russia
6.	Leonie Ebert	Germany
7.	Anastasia Ivanova	Russia
8.	Martyna Długosz	Poland

Quarter-finals
(Russia) Anastasia Ivanova	6
(Russia) Inna Deriglazova	15
(Poland) Martyna Długosz	13
(Italy) Alice Volpi	15
(Germany) Leonie Ebert	5
(Italy) Elisa Di Francisca	15
(Russia) Larisa Korobeynikova	11
(France) Ysaora Thibus	15

Semi-finals
(Russia) Inna Deriglazova	15
(Italy) Alice Volpi	11
(Italy) Elisa Di Francisca	15
(France) Ysaora Thibus	13

Final
(Italy) Elisa Di Francisca	15
(Russia) Inna Deriglazova	8

==== Épée individual ====
Position	Name	Country
1st place, gold medalist(s)	Coraline Vitalis	France
2nd place, silver medalist(s)	Marie-Florence Candassamy	France
3rd place, bronze medalist(s)	Alexandra Ndolo	Germany
3rd place, bronze medalist(s)	Ewa Trzebińska	Poland
5.	Yana Shemyakina	Ukraine
6.	Olena Kryvytska	Ukraine
7.	Alberta Santuccio	Italy
8.	Maria Udrea	Romania

Quarter-finals
(Poland) Ewa Trzebińska	15
(Ukraine) Olena Kryvytska	14
(Italy) Alberta Santuccio	9
(France) Marie-Florence Candassamy	15
(Germany) Alexandra Ndolo	15
(Romania) Maria Udrea	14
(Ukraine) Yana Shemyakina	14
(France) Coraline Vitalis	15

Semi-finals
(Poland) Ewa Trzebińska	11
(France) Marie-Florence Candassamy	12
(Germany) Alexandra Ndolo	12
(France) Coraline Vitalis	15

Final
(France) Marie-Florence Candassamy	11
(France) Coraline Vitalis	15

==== Sabre individual ====
Position	Name	Country
1st place, gold medalist(s)	Olha Kharlan	Ukraine
2nd place, silver medalist(s)	Manon Brunet	France
3rd place, bronze medalist(s)	Sofya Velikaya	Russia
3rd place, bronze medalist(s)	Anna Márton	Hungary
5.	Irene Vecchi	Italy
6.	Olga Nikitina	Russia
7.	Despina Georgiadou	Greece
8.	Charlotte Lembach	France

Quarter-finals
(Russia) Sofya Velikaya	15
(France) Charlotte Lembach	4
(France) Manon Brunet	15
(Greece) Despina Georgiadou	6
(Italy) Irene Vecchi	12
(Hungary) Anna Márton	15
(Russia) Olga Nikitina	8
(Ukraine) Olha Kharlan	15

Semi-finals
(Russia) Sofya Velikaya	11
(France) Manon Brunet	15
(Hungary) Anna Márton	10
(Ukraine) Olha Kharlan	15

Final
(France) Manon Brunet	12
(Ukraine) Olha Kharlan	15

==== Épée team ====
Round of 16
Poland	45
Belgium	22
Switzerland	38
Hungary	45
Germany	45
Spain	21
Finland	33
France	45
Estonia	45
Great Britain	25
Israel	29
Italy	45
Ukraine	40
Romania	33
Czech Republic	28
Russia	45

Quarter-finals
Poland	40
Hungary	29
Germany	43
France	45
Estonia	29
Italy	45
Ukraine	31
Russia	35

Semi-finals
Poland	45
France	37
Italy	35
Russia	36

Final
Poland	26
Russia	25
Third place
France	38
Italy	45

==== Foil team ====
Round of 16
Great Britain	37
Ukraine	40
Romania	21
Poland	42
Spain	44
Austria	43

Quarter-finals
France	45
Ukraine	34
Hungary	31
Germany	45
Russia	45
Poland	24
Spain	28
Italy	45

Semi-finals
France	45
Germany	28
Russia	44
Italy	32

Final
France	32
Russia	45
Third place
Germany	36
Italy	45

==== Sabre team ====
Round of 16
Great Britain	44
Poland	45
Hungary	45
Belarus	40
Romania	32
Ukraine	45
Italy	45
Bulgaria	34
Azerbaijan	45
Spain	31
Germany	45
Turkey	38
Georgia	29
Russia	45

Quarter-finals
France	45
Poland	34
Hungary	45
Ukraine	44
Italy	45
Azerbaijan	42
Germany	34
Russia	45

Semi-finals
France	40
Hungary	45
Italy	39
Russia	45

Final
Hungary	34
Russia	45
Third place
France	45
Italy	42
