= Violetta Bida =

Russian fencer

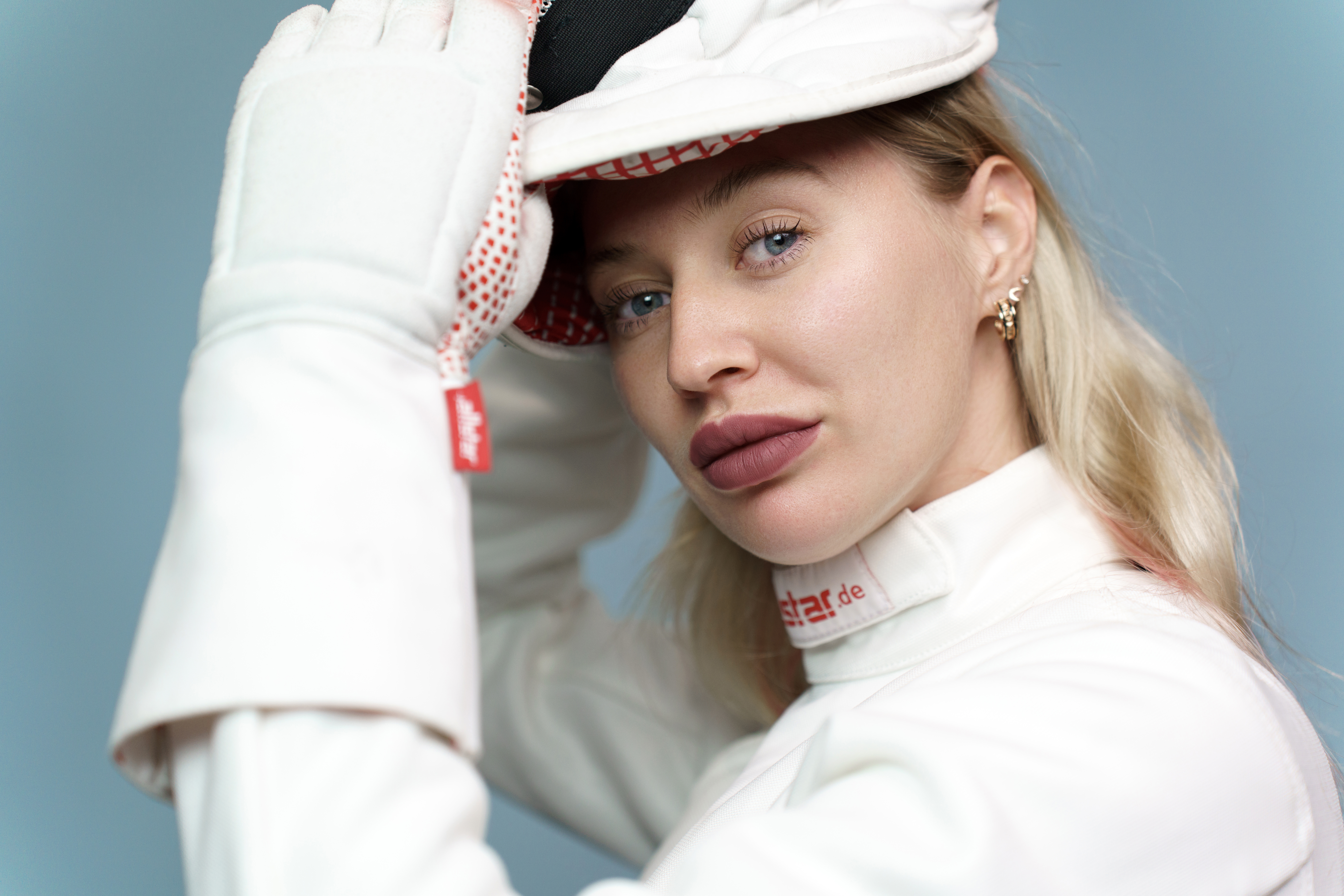

Personal information
- Native name: Виолетта Владимировна•Храпина
- Full name: Violetta Vladimirovna Khrapina Bida
- Born: 18 March 1994 (age 32) Samara, Russia

Fencing career
- Sport: Fencing
- Country: Russia
- Weapon: Épée
- Hand: left-handed
- Club: Bida Fencing Academy; California
- FIE ranking: current ranking
Medal record
World Championships
Silver medal – second place	2019 Budapest	Team
European Championships
Silver medal – second place	2019 Düsseldorf	Team

Violetta Vladimirovna Khrapina Bida (Russian: Виолетта Владимировна Храпина; born 18 March 1994) is a Russian Olympic épée fencer. She competed at the 2019 World Fencing Championships, winning a team épée silver medal. She also fenced in 2021 in the 2020 Tokyo Olympics. She moved to California in the United States in June 2023, along with her husband, Olympic épée fencer Sergey Bida.

== Early life ==
She was born in Novokuibyshevsk, a small town in Samara, Russia. She studied at Samara State University and the Smolensk State Academy of Physical Education. She began in ballet, ballroom dancing, and rhythmic gymnastics, before taking up fencing at the age of 12.

She like fencing immediately. As she recalled later: "At the first training session, they showed me a fencing stance, and immediately put me in a match with my twin sister. I remembered all my childhood grievances, and threw them out on the path." "I really liked it,” she laughed.

Within two years, she was competing on junior national teams. She initially met her husband, Olympic épée fencer Sergey Bida, when they were kids at fencing training camps. At the time she mostly found him annoying, and jokes now: "Some days, I remember how I hated him." They married in February 2023.

== Fencing career ==
=== Russia ===
==== 2010–15; World U-20 Championships gold medal ====
She fenced in Russia with the Samara Fencing Club.

In November 2010 she won the gold medal in the Grenoble Épée Women's U17 Team tournament in France. In 2010/2011, she was ranked 6th in the world in épée among female cadets (U17). In November 2011, she won a silver medal in the Bratislava Fencing World Cup in Slovakia.

In February 2012, she won a silver medal in the Maalot, Israel Fencing World Cup. In November 2012, she won the gold medal in the Bratislava World Cup in Slovakia. In December 2012, she won a silver medal in the Uhlmann World Cup in Laupheim, Germany, losing only to Katrina Lehis of Estonia. In 2012/2013, she was ranked 5th in the world among juniors (U20).

In February 2013, she won a bronze medal in the Maalot, Israel World Cup. In March 2013, she won a gold medal in épée team at the European Junior Championships. In June 2013, she won a gold medal in épée team at the European U-23 Championships.

In February 2014, she won a silver medal in the Maalot, Israel, World Cup. In April 2014, she won a gold medal in the World Championships Épée Women's U20 Team in Plovdiv, Bulgaria. In May 2014 she won a bronze medal in the Warsaw U23 European Épée Women's Senior Individual tournament in Poland.

In January 2015 she won a silver medal in the Busto Arsizio U23 European Épée Women's Senior Individual tournament in Italy. In October 2015 she won a bronze medal in the Colmar U23 European Épée Women's Senior Individual tournament in France.

==== 2019–23; World Championships silver medal ====
In January 2019, she won a bronze medal in the Havana World Cup in Cuba in Épée Women's Senior Team. In June 2019, she won a silver medal in the European Championships Épée Women's Senior Team in Düsseldorf, Germany.

She won a silver medal in team épée at the 2019 World Fencing Championships, in July in Budapest, Hungary. In November 2019, she won a gold medal in the Tallinn World Cup in Estonia in Épée Women's Senior Team.

She fenced in July 2021 in the Tokyo Olympics, coming in 8th in women's épée team. Up until the time she left Russia, she was paid a salary for being a member of the Russian national fencing team. In February 2022, Russia invaded Ukraine. Explaining why athletes don't speak out against the war, she said: "They are afraid. You're afraid not just to say something for publication in the media. You are afraid to say too much during training in the gym."

In January 2023, she won the All-Russian competition in Moscow.

=== United States (2023-present) ===
In May 2023 she left Russia and moved to the United States to embark on a career there, joining the Academy of Fencing Masters in northern California. She is both coaching and will be competing in the United States, as is her husband Sergey Bida. She and her husband joined Konstantin Lokhanov as Olympic fencers who left Russia to go to the United States after the Russian invasion of Ukraine.

In reaction to the emigration of her and her husband to the United States, the Russian Fencing Federation fired the Bidas' former coach, Russian national épée team head coach Alexander Glazunov. When asked about his firing, the coach said: "I don't know why I'm responsible. It’s better to ask the [Russian Fencing Federation]." The Sports Examiner commented: "This story is almost too strange to be true."

On December 27, 2023, the Russian state-run newspaper Pravda reported that she and her husband had been put on the Russian Ministry of Internal Affairs "wanted list for escaping to USA." While Russia issued warrants for the couple's arrest, Pravda reported that it was unclear what Russian criminal code the Russian government had accused the Bidas of violating. At the same time, the Russian press wrote that the fencers faced up to 10 years in prison in Russia.

Days later, the United States Olympic & Paralympic Committee (USOPC) and USA Fencing both wrote letters in support of Bida, her husband, and Lokhanov being granted U.S. citizenship. USOPC CEO Sarah Hirshland wrote as to the fencers, in a January 4, 2024, letter: "Our intention in endorsing their cause is to enable them to proudly represent our remarkable nation in the upcoming 2024 Olympic Games and other forthcoming international competitions." Phil Andrews, the CEO of USA Fencing, wrote in a January 5, 2024, letter to the U.S. Congress: "All 3 of these individuals have made sacrifices at great personal cost, and put their lives at risk to be able to represent our nation, and we ask you to make every effort to support them in the extraordinary circumstance." Bida said she would be "honored" to become an American citizen.

Shortly after the support of the USOPC and USA Fencing for the defecting fencers to obtain U.S. citizenship was made public, Sergey Malinkovich, the Chairman of the Central Committee of the Communists of Russia party, crudely threatened the fencers by sending them a portrait of Leon Trotsky. Trotsky had also emigrated decades earlier, and was assassinated by a Soviet agent in Mexico in 1940. Malinkovich noted: "everyone knows how it ended." He added: "I also urge the Russian special services to form an excellent team of fencers and ensure their participation in the competition in which the traitor Bida will participate." Russian State Duma deputy Vitaly Milonov called the fencers "cowards, traitors, and defectors" and "political rags." Russian Olympic Committee President Stanislav Pozdnyakov said: "they were promised to be treated with some sweet cookies. The most important thing is that they don’t choke on them." Soviet-Russian former four-time Olympic champion biathlete Alexander Tikhonov called the Bidas traitors to Russia. Yelena Välbe, the head of the Russian Cross-Country Skiing Federation, said about the three fencers: "It's shameful to run ... We have to be patriots." Other Russian officials also pledged that there would be consequences. Pravda shed light on the Russian officials' reaction, writing: "It is difficult to overestimate the propaganda value of sports, but "defectors" influence public opinion no less."

Her fencing club is now the Academy of Fencing Masters in the United States. As of January 2024, she was six months pregnant. The couple now lives in a one-bedroom apartment, as they await the birth of their first child, and teach children at the local fencing club. Commenting on the reception she and her husband have received at their fencing club in the United States, she said: "They created a baby shower for us. For me, it was really the first time that I understood how people can be generous to other people."

In January 2024, asked in an interview by USA Today about the possibility of her and her husband representing the United States, she responded: "We're ready." Later in the interview she added: "When I stepped on American soil, I started feeling freedom."

== See also ==
- Krystsina Tsimanouskaya, Belarusian Olympic sprinter who defected to Poland.
