= Men's team épée at the 2023 World Fencing Championships =

- Venue: Milan Convention Center
- Location: Milan, Italy
- Dates: 28–29 July
- Competitors: 178 from 46 nations
- Teams: 46

Medalists
gold medal	Gabriele Cimini; Andrea Santarelli; Davide Di Veroli; Federico Vismara	Italy
silver medal	Alexandre Bardenet; Gaétan Billa; Yannick Borel; Romain Cannone	France
bronze medal	Francisco Limardo; Jesús Limardo; Rubén Limardo; Grabiel Lugo	Venezuela

The Men's team épée competition at the 2023 World Fencing Championships was held on 29 July 2023.

== Draw ==
=== Finals ===
Semifinals
France	45
South Korea	28
Venezuela	23
Italy	35

Final
France	32
Italy	45
Third place
South Korea	41
Venezuela	45

=== Top half ===
==== Section 1 ====
Round of 64
Kyrgyzstan	38
Saudi Arabia	45
Kuwait	24
Austria	45
Morocco	45
El Salvador	24

Round of 32
France	45
Saudi Arabia	41
Canada	41
Netherlands	30
China	45
Austria	41
Morocco	28
Kazakhstan	45

Round of 16
France	45
Canada	26
China	38
Kazakhstan	45

Quarterfinals
France	45
Kazakhstan	26

==== Section 2 ====
Round of 64
Panama	35
Estonia	45
Poland	45
New Zealand	20
Turkmenistan	22
United States	45
Portugal	45
India	26

Round of 32
South Korea	44
Estonia	37
Poland	35
Ukraine	34
Germany	45
United States	36
Portugal	23
Japan	38

Round of 16
South Korea	44
Poland	39
Germany	45
Japan	41

Quarterfinals
South Korea	45
Germany	35

=== Bottom half ===
==== Section 3 ====
Round of 64
Mexico	45
Singapore	29
Argentina	44
Croatia	43
Finland	45
Sweden	32
Denmark	38
Chinese Taipei	28

Round of 32
Hungary	45
Mexico	32
Argentina	26
Israel	45
Spain	45
Finland	41
Denmark	29
Venezuela	45

Round of 16
Hungary	45
Israel	34
Spain	43
Venezuela	44

Quarterfinals
Hungary	20
Venezuela	21

==== Section 4 ====
Round of 64
Philippines	37
Uzbekistan	45
Hong Kong	45
Australia	33
Togo
Colombia	w/o
Great Britain	40
Brazil	44

Round of 32
Switzerland	36
Uzbekistan	37
Hong Kong	30
Czech Republic	45
Egypt	45
Colombia	24
Brazil	21
Italy	44

Round of 16
Uzbekistan	32
Czech Republic	39
Egypt	25
Italy	44

Quarterfinals
Czech Republic	36
Italy	38

=== Placement rounds ===
==== 5–8th place bracket ====
5–8th place semifinals
Kazakhstan	38
Germany	44
Hungary	22
Czech Republic	21

Fifth place
Germany	34
Hungary	45
Seventh place
Kazakhstan	45
Czech Republic	34

==== 9–16th place bracket ====
9–16th place quarterfinals
Canada	34
China	31
Poland	29
Japan	45
Israel	45
Spain	40
Uzbekistan	36
Egypt	44

9–12th place semifinals
Canada	34
Japan	42
Israel	42
Egypt	45

Ninth place
Japan	37
Egypt	38
Eleventh place
Canada	44
Israel	45

==== 13–16th place bracket ====
13–16th place semifinals
China	45
Poland	33
Spain	45
Uzbekistan	38

13th place
China	45
Spain	42
15th place
Poland	40
Uzbekistan	43

== Final ranking ==
Rank	Team
1st place, gold medalist(s)	Italy
2nd place, silver medalist(s)	France
3rd place, bronze medalist(s)	Venezuela
4	South Korea
5	Hungary
6	Germany
7	Kazakhstan
8	Czech Republic
9	Egypt
10	Japan
11	Israel
12	Canada
13	China
14	Spain
15	Uzbekistan
16	Poland
17	Switzerland
18	Ukraine
19	Netherlands
20	Colombia
21	Argentina
22	United States
23	Hong Kong
24	Austria
25	Morocco
26	Denmark
27	Estonia
28	Portugal
29	Saudi Arabia
30	Brazil
31	Mexico
32	Finland
33	Sweden
34	Singapore
35	Great Britain
36	Kyrgyzstan
37	India
38	Panama
39	Chinese Taipei
40	Philippines
41	El Salvador
42	Kuwait
43	Australia
44	New Zealand
45	Turkmenistan
46	Croatia
DNS	Togo
