= Damiano Rosatelli =

Italian fencer (born 1995)

Personal information
- Nationality: Italian
- Born: 4 November 1995 (age 30) Genzano di Roma

Sport
- Country: Italy
- Sport: Fencing
Medal record
European Games
| Silver medal – second place | 2015 Baku | Team foil |
Junior World Championships
| Gold medal – first place | 2015 Tashkent | Individual |
| Gold medal – first place | 2015 Tashkent | Team |
Universiade
| Gold medal – first place | 2019 Naples | Individual foil |
| Gold medal – first place | 2019 Naples | Team foil |
Military World Games
| Bronze medal – third place | 2019 Wuhan | Team foil |

Damiano Rosatelli (born 4 November 1995) is an Italian fencer who won an individual gold medal at the 2019 Summer Universiade. He won a gold medal in team foil, at the 2018 European Fencing Under 23 Championships.

== Biography ==
Damiano Rossateli was born in Genzano di Roma, Italy. When he was a child, he tried swimming and football, but eventually found his favorite sport in fencing. He began fencing at the age of nine; he enjoys doing it and even 'fall in love' with fencing. He likes sport, music, and travelling. He works as a police officer. He is right-handed, and his primary weapon is the foil (Fioretto)

== See also ==
- Italy at the 2019 Summer Universiade
