= Men's team épée at the 2022 World Fencing Championships =

- Venue: Cairo Stadium Indoor Halls Complex
- Location: Cairo, Egypt
- Dates: 21–22 July
- Competitors: 176 from 44 nations
- Teams: 44

Medalists
| gold medal | Alexandre Bardenet; Yannick Borel; Romain Cannone; Alex Fava | France |
| silver medal | Gabriele Cimini; Davide Di Veroli; Andrea Santarelli; Federico Vismara | Italy |
| bronze medal | Koki Kano; Ryu Matsumoto; Kazuyasu Minobe; Masaru Yamada | Japan |

The Men's team épée competition at the 2022 World Fencing Championships was held on 21 and 22 July 2022.

== Draw ==
=== Finals ===
Semifinals
Japan | 31
Italy | 41
France | 45
Hungary | 37

Final
Italy | 42
France | 45
Third place
Japan | 45
Hungary | 30

=== Top half ===
==== Section 1 ====
Round of 64
Libya | 19
Belgium | 45
Finland
South Africa | w/o
Canada | 45
United Arab Emirates | 35

Round of 32
Japan | 45
Belgium | 38
Poland | 22
Venezuela | 32
China | 45
South Africa | 32
Canada | 45
United States | 35

Round of 16
Japan | 32
Venezuela | 25
China | 45
Canada | 33

Quarterfinals
Japan | 45
China | 41

==== Section 2 ====
Round of 64
Azerbaijan | 45
Kyrgyzstan | 41
Sweden | 45
Nepal | 14
Iraq | 32
Uzbekistan | 45
Austria | 45
Singapore | 36

Round of 32
Italy | 45
Azerbaijan | 31
Sweden | 43
Kazakhstan | 39
Spain | 34
Uzbekistan | 33
Austria | 39
Ukraine | 45

Round of 16
Italy | 45
Sweden | 32
Spain | 37
Ukraine | 42

Quarterfinals
Italy | 45
Ukraine | 39

=== Bottom half ===
==== Section 3 ====
Round of 64
Chile | 26
Netherlands | 45
Iran | 20
Czech Republic | 45
Hong Kong | 45
India | 35

Round of 32
France | 45
Netherlands | 31
Colombia | 45
Denmark | 28
Israel | 35
Czech Republic | 45
Hong Kong | 21
Switzerland | 35

Round of 16
France | 45
Colombia | 36
Czech Republic | 37
Switzerland | 45

Quarterfinals
France | 45
Switzerland | 42

==== Section 4 ====
Round of 64
Kuwait | 28
Estonia | 45
Saudi Arabia | 28
Portugal | 45
Great Britain | 45
Australia | 42

Round of 32
Hungary | 35
Estonia | 27
Portugal | 45
Egypt | 41
Germany | 44
Argentina | 41
Great Britain | 33
South Korea | 45

Round of 16
Hungary | 34
Portugal | 20
Germany | 35
South Korea | 45

Quarterfinals
Hungary | 45
South Korea | 33

=== Placement rounds ===
==== 5–8th place bracket ====
5–8th place semifinals
China | 45
Ukraine | 40
Switzerland | 43
South Korea | 32

Fifth place
China | 43
Switzerland | 44
Seventh place
Ukraine | 39
South Korea | 45

==== 9–16th place bracket ====
9–16th place quarterfinals
Venezuela | 39
Canada | 38
Sweden | 41
Spain | 45
Colombia | 27
Czech Republic | 33
Portugal | 45
Germany | 40

9–12th place semifinals
Venezuela | 40
Spain | 36
Czech Republic | 45
Germany | 40

Ninth place
Venezuela | 45
Czech Republic | 37
Eleventh place
Spain | 44
Germany | 45

==== 13–16th place bracket ====
13–16th place semifinals
Canada | 45
Sweden | 43
Colombia | 34
Portugal | 45

13th place
Canada | 45
Portugal | 26
15th place
Sweden | 45
Colombia | 40

== Final ranking ==
| Rank | Team |
|---|---|
| 1st place, gold medalist(s) | France |
| 2nd place, silver medalist(s) | Italy |
| 3rd place, bronze medalist(s) | Japan |
| 4 | Hungary |
| 5 | Switzerland |
| 6 | China |
| 7 | South Korea |
| 8 | Ukraine |
| 9 | Venezuela |
| 10 | Czech Republic |
| 11 | Germany |
| 12 | Spain |
| 13 | Canada |
| 14 | Portugal |
| 15 | Sweden |
| 16 | Colombia |
| 17 | United States |
| 18 | Egypt |
| 19 | Israel |
| 20 | Kazakhstan |
| 21 | Denmark |
| 22 | Poland |
| 23 | Argentina |
| 24 | Uzbekistan |
| 25 | South Africa |
| 26 | Estonia |
| 27 | Hong Kong |
| 28 | Austria |
| 29 | Netherlands |
| 30 | Great Britain |
| 31 | Belgium |
| 32 | Azerbaijan |
| 33 | Saudi Arabia |
| 34 | Kyrgyzstan |
| 35 | Libya |
| 36 | Australia |
| 37 | Chile |
| 38 | Singapore |
| 39 | India |
| 40 | Kuwait |
| 41 | United Arab Emirates |
| 42 | Iran |
| 43 | Nepal |
| 44 | Iraq |
