= Ihor Reizlin =

Ukrainian épée fencer (born 1984)

Ihor Dmitrovych Reizlin
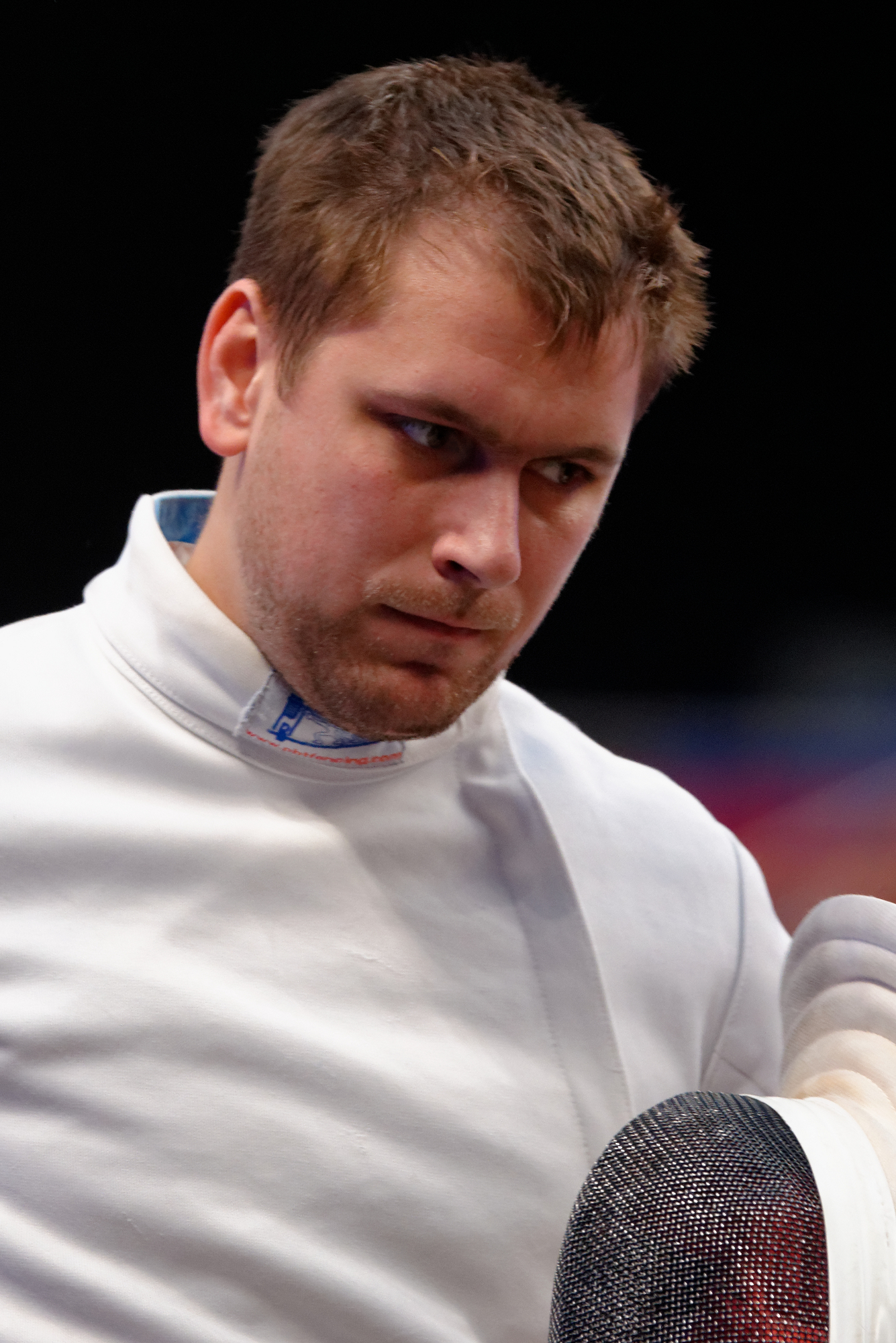
- Reizlin in 2014

Personal information
- Born: 7 December 1984 (age 41) Bender, Moldavian SSR, Soviet Union

Fencing career
- Sport: Fencing
- Country: Ukraine
- Weapon: Épée
- Hand: right-handed
- Club: Central Sports Club of the Armed Forces
- Head coach: Dmytro Reizlin
- FIE ranking: current ranking
Medal record
Men's épée
Representing Ukraine
Olympic Games
Bronze medal – third place	2020 Tokyo	Individual
World Championships
Silver medal – second place	2019 Budapest	Team
Bronze medal – third place	2019 Budapest	Individual
Bronze medal – third place	2022 Cairo	Individual
European Championships
Silver medal – second place	2010 Leipzig	Team
Summer Universiade
Bronze medal – third place	2009 Bangkok	Team
Military Games
Gold medal – first place	2019 Wuhan	Individual
Silver medal – second place	2003 Catania	Individual

Ihor Dmytrovych Reizlin (Ukrainian: Ігор Дмитрович Рейзлін; born 7 December 1984) is a Ukrainian right-handed épée fencer and 2021 individual Olympic bronze medalist.

== Medal record ==
=== Olympic Games ===
Year	Location	Event	Position
2021	Tokyo, Japan	Individual Men's Épée	3rd

=== World Championship ===
Year	Location	Event	Position
2019	Budapest, Hungary	Individual Men's Épée	3rd
2019	Budapest, Hungary	Team Men's Épée	2nd
2022	Cairo, Egypt	Individual Men's Épée	3rd

=== European Championship ===
Year	Location	Event	Position
2010	Leipzig, Germany	Team Men's Épée	2nd

=== Grand Prix ===
Date	Location	Event	Position
2020-03-06	Budapest, Hungary	Individual Men's Épée	3rd

=== World Cup ===
Date	Location	Event	Position
2004-02-14	Bratislava, Slovakia	Individual Men's Épée	3rd
2009-03-27	Heidenheim, Germany	Individual Men's Épée	3rd
2017-10-27	Bern, Switzerland	Individual Men's Épée	3rd
2019-11-22	Bern, Switzerland	Individual Men's Épée	1st
2021-03-19	Kazan, Russia	Individual Men's Épée	1st
2022-02-11	Sochi, Russia	Individual Men's Épée	3rd
2022-05-27	(Georgia (country)) Tbilisi, Georgia	Individual Men's Épée	3rd
