= Coraline Vitalis =

French fencer (born 1995)

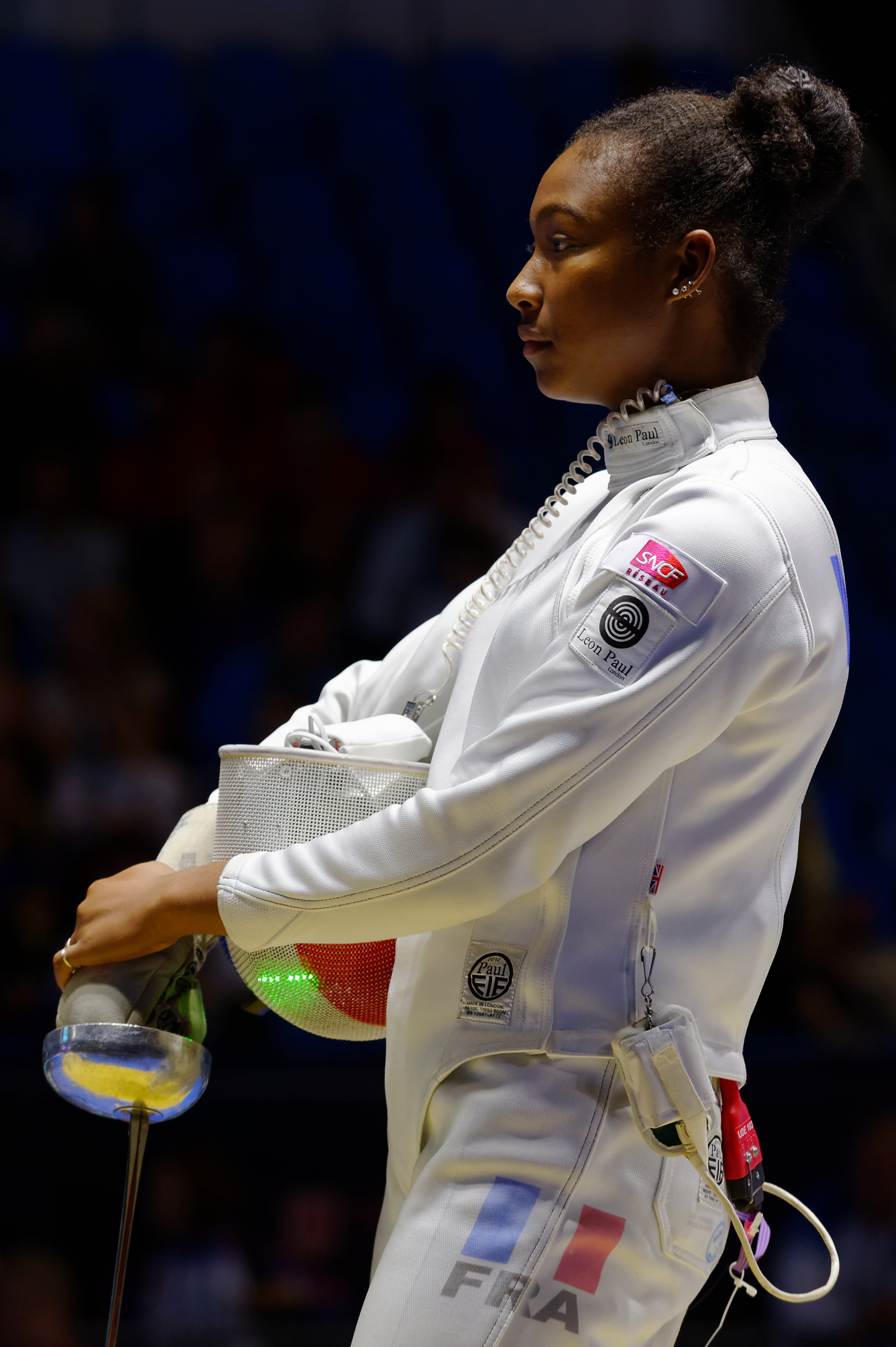
- Vitalis in 2015

Personal information
- Nationality: French
- Born: 9 May 1995 (age 31) Le Gosier, Guadeloupe

Sport
- Country: France
- Sport: Fencing
- Event: Épée
Medal record
Women's épée
Representing France
Olympic Games
Silver medal – second place	2024 Paris	Team
European Games
Gold medal – first place	2023 Kraków–Małopolska	Team
European Championships
Gold medal – first place	2017 Tbilisi	Team
Gold medal – first place	2018 Novi Sad	Team
Gold medal – first place	2019 Düsseldorf	Individual
Gold medal – first place	2022 Antalya	Team
Gold medal – first place	2023 Kraków	Team
Bronze medal – third place	2024 Basel	Team

Coraline Vitalis (French pronunciation: [kɔʁalin vitalis]; born 9 May 1995) is a French fencer. She competed in the 2020 and 2024 Olympics, winning a silver medal in the latter.
