= Gergely Siklósi =

Hungarian épée fencer

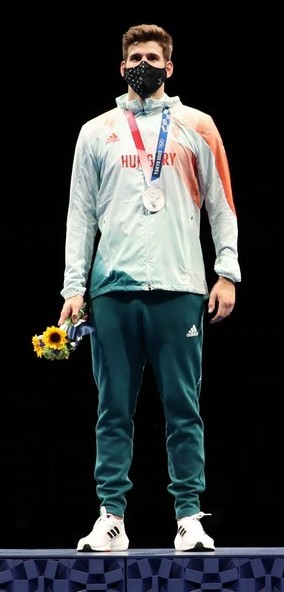
- Siklósi at the 2020 Summer Olympics

Personal information
- Born: 4 September 1997 (age 29) Tapolca, Hungary

Fencing career
- Sport: Fencing
- Country: Hungary
- Weapon: Épée
- Hand: right-handed
- Club: Balaton Vívóklub ( –2016); Bp. Honvéd (2017– )
- Head coach: Tamás Dancsházy-Nagy
- Former coach: Gyöngyi Szalay-Horváth
- FIE ranking: current ranking
Medal record
Men's épée
Representing Hungary
Event	1st	2nd	3rd
Olympic Games	1	1	0
World Championships	1	2	0
European Championships	1	1	1
Total	3	4	1
Olympic Games
Gold medal – first place	2024 Paris	Team
Silver medal – second place	2020 Tokyo	Individual
World Championships
Gold medal – first place	2019 Budapest	Individual
Silver medal – second place	2025 Tbilisi	Individual
Silver medal – second place	2025 Tbilisi	Team
European Games
Gold medal – first place	2023 Kraków–Małopolska	Team
European Championships
Gold medal – first place	2023 Kraków	Team
Silver medal – second place	2024 Basel	Individual
Bronze medal – third place	2019 Düsseldorf	Team
Bronze medal – third place	2025 Genoa	Individual
Junior World Championships
Bronze medal – third place	2015 Tashkent	Team
Bronze medal – third place	2017 Plovdiv	Individual
Bronze medal – third place	2017 Plovdiv	Team

Gergely Siklósi (born 4 September 1997) is a Hungarian right-handed épée fencer, 2019 individual world champion, and 2021 individual Olympic silver medalist.

== Medal record ==
=== Olympic Games ===
Year	Location	Event	Position
2021	Tokyo, Japan	Individual Men's Épée	2nd
2024	Paris, France	Team Men's Épée	1st

=== World Championship ===
Year	Location	Event	Position
2019	Budapest, Hungary	Individual Men's Épée	1st

=== European Championship ===
Year	Location	Event	Position
2019	Düsseldorf, Germany	Team Men's Épée	3rd
2023	Kraków, Poland	Team Men's Épée	1st

=== Grand Prix ===
Date	Location	Event	Position
2022-04-29	Cairo, Egypt	Individual Men's Épée	3rd
2023-01-28	Doha, Qatar	Individual Men's Épée	1st

=== World Cup ===
Date	Location	Event	Position
2019-05-17	Paris, France	Individual Men's Épée	3rd
2020-01-09	Heidenheim, Germany	Individual Men's Épée	1st
2021-03-19	Kazan, Russia	Individual Men's Épée	2nd
2022-02-11	Sochi, Russia	Individual Men's Épée	3rd
2022-05-29	(Georgia (country)) Tbilisi, Georgia	Team Men's Épée	3rd
2022-11-13	Bern, Switzerland	Team Men's Épée	3rd
2022-12-17	Vancouver, Canada	Individual Men's Épée	1st

== Personal life ==
Competing for Honvéd, Siklósi is a member of the sports battalion of the Hungarian Defence Forces and was commanded to take part in the COVID-19 vaccination campaign in a Budapest hospital with fellow Olympian András Rédli.

== Awards ==
- Hungarian Fencer of the Year: 2019
