= Gabriele Cimini =

Italian fencer (born 1994)

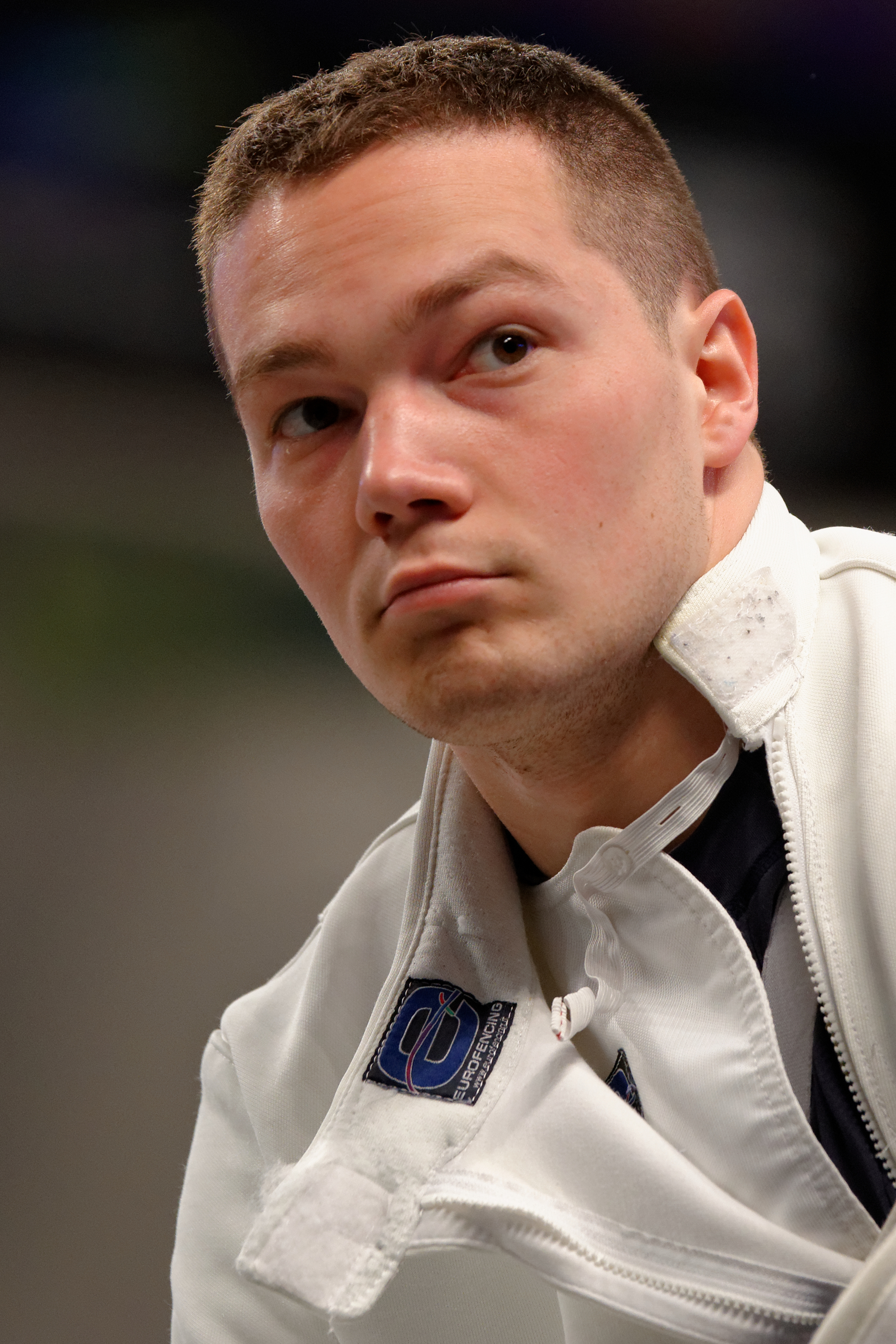
- Gabriele Cimini, 2014

Personal information
- Nationality: Italian
- Born: 9 June 1994 (age 32) Pisa, Italy

Fencing career
- Sport: Fencing
- Weapon: Épée
- FIE ranking: current ranking
Medal record
Men's épée
Representing Italy
World Championships
Gold medal – first place	2023 Milan	Team
Silver medal – second place	2022 Cairo	Team
European Games
Bronze medal – third place	2015 Baku	Team
Bronze medal – third place	2023 Kraków–Małopolska	Team
European Championships
Gold medal – first place	2022 Antalya	Team
Silver medal – second place	2024 Basel	Team
Bronze medal – third place	2018 Novi Sad	Team
Bronze medal – third place	2023 Kraków	Team

Gabriele Cimini (born 9 June 1994) is an Italian right-handed épée fencer, 2022 team European champion, and 2021 Olympian.

== Medal record ==
=== World Championship ===
Year	Location	Event	Position
2022	Cairo, Egypt	Team Men's Épée	2nd

=== European Championship ===
Year	Location	Event	Position
2022	Antalya, Turkey	Team Men's Épée	1st

=== Grand Prix ===
Date	Location	Event	Position
2022-03-04	Budapest, Hungary	Individual Men's Épée	3rd

=== World Cup ===
Date	Location	Event	Position
2018-01-25	Heidenheim, Germany	Individual Men's Épée	3rd
2019-03-22	Buenos Aires, Argentina	Individual Men's Épée	2nd
2022-05-12	Heidenheim, Germany	Individual Men's Épée	3rd
