= Yannick Borel =

French fencer (born 1988)

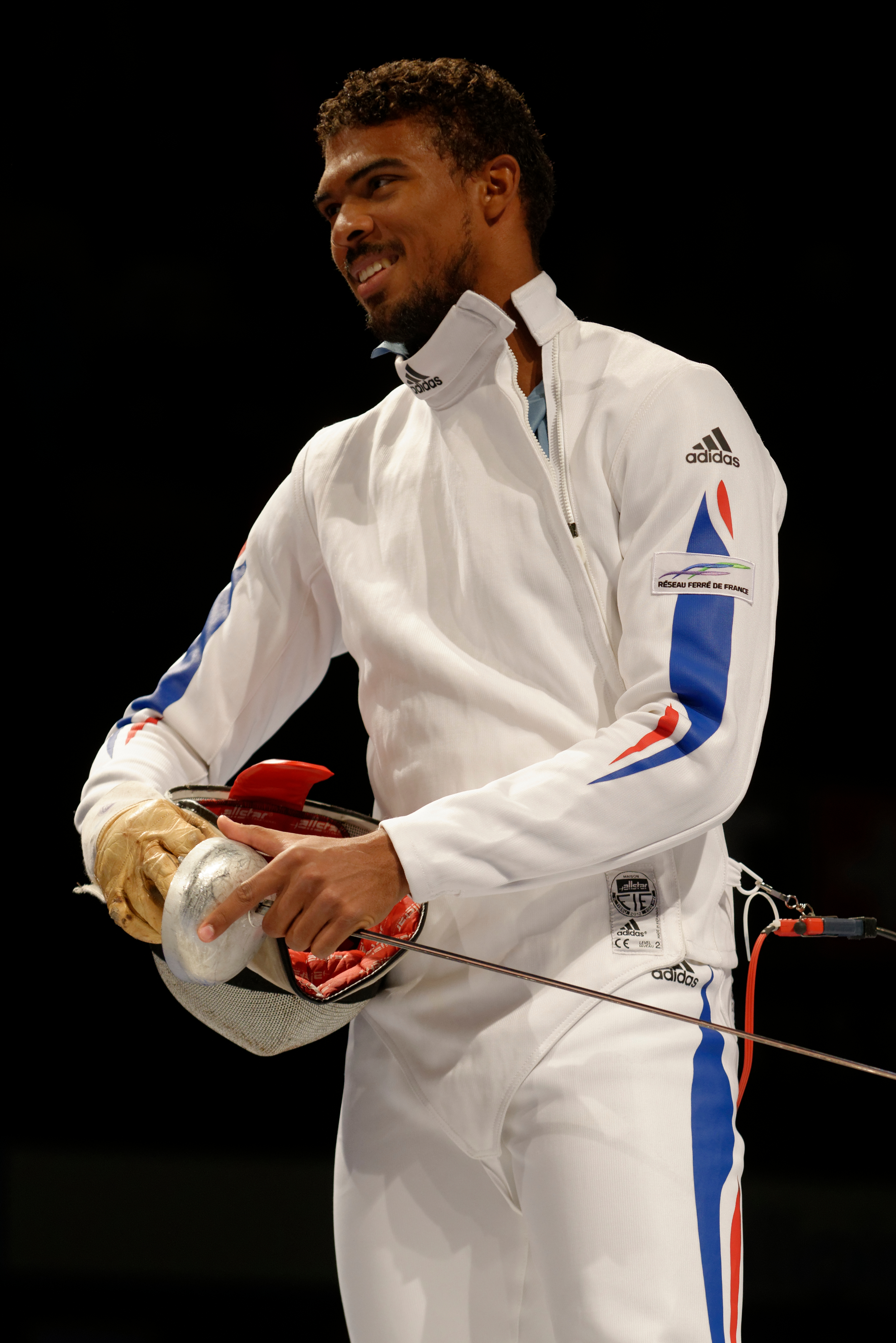
- Borel in 2013

Personal information
- Born: 5 November 1988 (age 37) Pointe-à-Pitre, Guadeloupe
- Height: 1.95 m (6 ft 5 in)
- Weight: 94 kg (207 lb)

Fencing career
- Sport: Fencing
- Country: France
- Weapon: Épée
- Hand: right-handed
- National coach: Hugues Obry
- Club: Levallois Sporting Club
- FIE ranking: current ranking
Medal record
Men's épée
Representing France
Olympic Games
Gold medal – first place	2016 Rio de Janeiro	Team
Silver medal – second place	2024 Paris	Individual
World Championships
Gold medal – first place	2011 Catania	Team
Gold medal – first place	2017 Leipzig	Team
Gold medal – first place	2018 Wuxi	Individual
Gold medal – first place	2019 Budapest	Team
Gold medal – first place	2022 Cairo	Team
Silver medal – second place	2012 Kyiv	Team
Silver medal – second place	2023 Milan	Team
European Games
Gold medal – first place	2015 Baku	Team
European Championships
Gold medal – first place	2011 Sheffield	Team
Gold medal – first place	2016 Toruń	Individual
Gold medal – first place	2016 Toruń	Team
Gold medal – first place	2017 Tbilisi	Individual
Gold medal – first place	2018 Novi Sad	Individual
Gold medal – first place	2022 Antalya	Individual
Silver medal – second place	2018 Novi Sad	Team
Bronze medal – third place	2022 Antalya	Team

Yannick Borel (born 5 November 1988) is a French right-handed épée fencer.

Borel is a two-time team European champion, four-time individual European champion, four-time team world champion, and 2018 individual world champion.

A four-time Olympian, Borel is a 2016 team Olympic champion.

Borel competed in the 2012 London Olympic Games, the 2016 Rio de Janeiro Olympic Games, and the 2020 Tokyo Olympic Games.

In the 2024 Paris Olympics, Borel won the silver medal, losing to Koki Kano of Japan.

== Career ==
=== Early years ===
Borel was born in Guadeloupe, overseas France. When he had to choose an extracurricular activity at the age of ten, he hesitated between fencing and gwo ka, a genre of Guadeloupe folk music. He chose the former because the club was close to his school and several of his friends already fenced. Five-time Olympic medallist Laura Flessel, also from Guadeloupe, was also a major inspiration for him. He learnt épée under coaches Rudy Plicoste and Barbara Paulin.

At the age of fifteen he was noticed by France's head coach Jérôme Roussat, who offered him a spot at the national junior training centre in Reims, Metropolitan France. Borel's parents refused, because they wanted him to finish high school before focusing on sport. He was allowed to go after he obtained his baccalauréat in 2007 and began training with the best junior fencers alongside to his physical therapy studies. That year he was selected into the French national junior team that won a silver medal at the Junior European Championships in Prague. The next season, he earned a silver medal at the Herakled Cup in Budapest and won the Uhlmann Cup in Laupheim, two events of the Junior World Cup. He also became junior national champion.

=== Senior career ===
In 2009 Borel gave up his physical therapy studies, which were too demanding for a high-performance athlete, and switched to physical education at INSEP, where he trained with the senior national team. He took part in the 2009 Summer Universiade, but did not earn any medal. Two quarter-finals finishes in the 2010–11 season had him selected into the senior national team for the first time. At the 2011 European Championships in Sheffield he reached the table of 16, defeating 2010 World silver medallist and teammate Gauthier Grumier along the way, but he yielded to Germany's Jörg Fiedler and finished 11th. In the team event France saw off Switzerland, Ukraine and finally Hungary to earn a gold medal.

After this result Borel transferred from the Cercle d'Escrime de Châlons to the Levallois Sporting Club, where he joined teammates Ulrich Robeiri and Gauthier Grumier. At the 2011 World Championships in Catania Borel reached again the table of 16, before being stopped by Korea's Park Kyoung-doo. In the team event France cruised to the quarter-finals, then defeated Germany, South Korea and Hungary to post their sixth World title in a row. Borel finished the season World No.14, a career best as of 2015.

In the 2011–12 season Borel climbed his first World Cup podium with a bronze medal in Legnano. He qualified to the 2012 Summer Olympics as one of the two top-ranked Europeans. As men's team épée did not feature on the Olympic programme, World Championships were held separately in April. France defeated Russia, then prevailed by a single hit over Italy in the semi-finals. They failed to establish a new record of seven straight World titles after a surprise 37–44 defeat against the United States and had to settle for silver. For his Olympic début Borel defeated Ukraine's Dmytro Karyuchenko and Switzerland's Fabian Kauter. In the quarter-finals he met Norway's Bartosz Piasecki and took an early 6–2 lead, but failed to press his advantage and was finally defeated 14–15 by Piasecki, who eventually won the silver medal.

After the Games Borel was dropped from the national team and had two dry seasons, although he was France's flagbearer at the 2013 University Games. He bounced back in the 2014–15 season with a silver medal at the Heidenheim World Cup.

He competed for France at the 2016 Olympics, where he was part of the French team that won the team gold medal. Because of this, he was made a knight of the Legion of Honour.

He won the gold medal in the men's épée event at the 2022 European Fencing Championships held in Antalya, Turkey.

== Medal record ==
=== Olympic Games ===
Year	Location	Event	Position
2016	Rio de Janeiro, Brazil	Team Men's Épée	1st
2024	Paris, France	Individual Men's Épée	2nd

=== World Championship ===
Year	Location	Event	Position
2011	Catania, Italy	Team Men's Épée	1st
2012	Kyiv, Ukraine	Team Men's Épée	2nd
2017	Leipzig, Germany	Team Men's Épée	1st
2018	Wuxi, China	Individual Men's Épée	1st
2019	Budapest, Hungary	Team Men's Épée	1st
2022	Cairo, Egypt	Team Men's Épée	1st
2023	Milan, Italy	Team Men's Épée	2nd

=== European Championship ===
Year	Location	Event	Position
2011	Sheffield, United Kingdom	Team Men's Épée	1st
2016	Toruń, Poland	Individual Men's Épée	1st
2016	Toruń, Poland	Team Men's Épée	1st
2017	(Georgia (country)) Tbilisi, Georgia	Individual Men's Épée	1st
2018	Novi Sad, Serbia	Individual Men's Épée	1st
2018	Novi Sad, Serbia	Team Men's Épée	2nd
2022	Antalya, Turkey	Individual Men's Épée	1st
2022	Antalya, Turkey	Team Men's Épée	3rd

=== Grand Prix ===
Date	Location	Event	Position
2015-05-22	Rio de Janeiro, Brazil	Individual Men's Épée	1st
2015-12-04	Doha, Qatar	Individual Men's Épée	3rd
2018-05-25	Cali, Colombia	Individual Men's Épée	1st
2019-01-25	Doha, Qatar	Individual Men's Épée	1st
2020-03-06	Budapest, Hungary	Individual Men's Épée	2nd
2022-01-28	Doha, Qatar	Individual Men's Épée	1st
2022-04-29	Cairo, Egypt	Individual Men's Épée	1st
2023-01-28	Doha, Qatar	Individual Men's Épée	3rd
2024-03-09	Budapest, Hungary	Individual Men's Épée	1st

=== World Cup ===
Date	Location	Event	Position
2012-01-27	Legnano, Italy	Individual Men's Épée	3rd
2015-01-22	Heidenheim, Germany	Individual Men's Épée	2nd
2016-11-18	Buenos Aires, Argentina	Individual Men's Épée	3rd
2017-01-26	Heidenheim, Germany	Individual Men's Épée	2nd
2017-02-17	Vancouver, Canada	Individual Men's Épée	3rd
2017-05-12	Paris, France	Individual Men's Épée	2nd
2018-02-16	Vancouver, Canada	Individual Men's Épée	3rd
2022-12-09	Vancouver, Canada	Individual Men's Épée	2nd
