= András Rédli =

Hungarian fencer

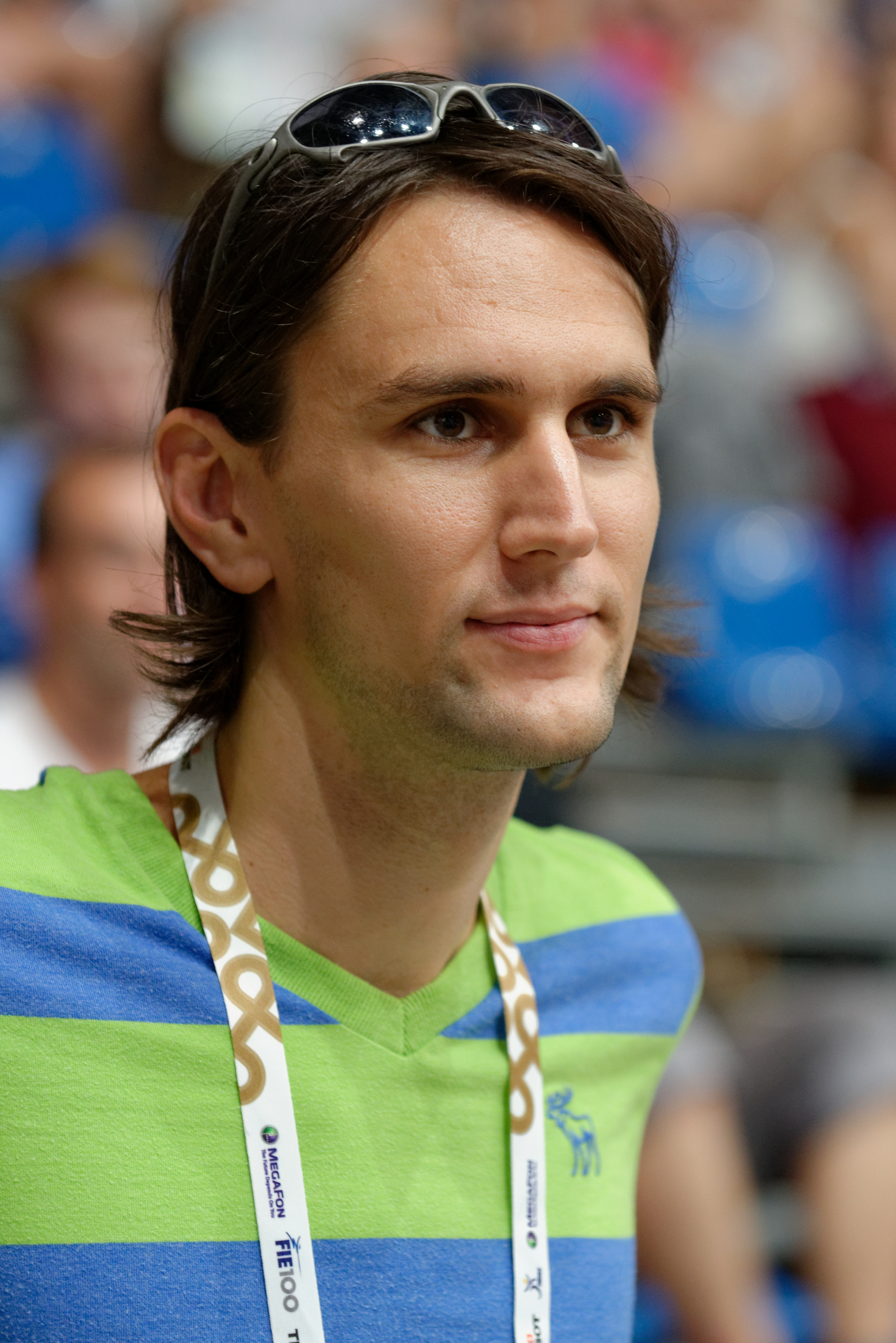
- Rédli at the 2013 World Fencing Championships

Personal information
- Born: 21 October 1983 (age 42) Tapolca, Hungary

Fencing career
- Sport: Fencing
- Country: Hungary
- Weapon: Épée
- Hand: Right-handed
- Club: Balaton Vívóklub (1995–2016); Honvéd (2017– )
- Head coach: Gábor Udvarhelyi
- Former coach: Kinga Borosné Eitner
- FIE ranking: current ranking

András Rédli (born 21 October 1983) is a Hungarian right-handed épée fencer, 2010 team European champion, 2014 individual European champion, 2013 team world champion, and 2016 Olympic medalist.

== Career ==
Rédli won the team gold medal in the 2013 World Championships at home in Budapest and the team gold in the 2009 European Championships in Plovdiv. He won the gold medal in the 2014 European Fencing Championships.

Rédli was educated at Óbuda University. He belongs to the Hungarian Defence Force.

== Medal Record ==
=== Olympic Games ===
| Year | Location | Event | Position |
|---|---|---|---|
| 2016 | Rio de Janeiro, Brazil | Team Men's Épée | 3rd |

=== World Championship ===
| Year | Location | Event | Position |
|---|---|---|---|
| 2009 | Antalya, Turkey | Team Men's Épée | 2nd |
| 2010 | Paris, France | Team Men's Épée | 3rd |
| 2012 | Kyiv, Ukraine | Team Men's Épée | 3rd |
| 2013 | Budapest, Hungary | Team Men's Épée | 1st |
| 2017 | Leipzig, Germany | Individual Men's Épée | 3rd |

=== European Championship ===
| Year | Location | Event | Position |
|---|---|---|---|
| 2009 | Plovdiv, Bulgaria | Team Men's Épée | 1st |
| 2010 | Leipzig, Germany | Team Men's Épée | 1st |
| 2011 | Sheffield, United Kingdom | Team Men's Épée | 2nd |
| 2013 | Zagreb, Croatia | Team Men's Épée | 2nd |
| 2014 | Strasbourg, France | Individual Men's Épée | 1st |
| 2019 | Düsseldorf, Germany | Team Men's Épée | 3rd |

=== Grand Prix ===
| Date | Location | Event | Position |
|---|---|---|---|
| 01/18/2008 | Doha, Qatar | Individual Men's Épée | 3rd |

=== World Cup ===
| Date | Location | Event | Position |
|---|---|---|---|
| 03/03/2007 | Berne, Switzerland | Individual Men's Épée | 3rd |
| 03/27/2009 | Heidenheim, Germany | Individual Men's Épée | 1st |
| 05/09/2009 | Paris, France | Individual Men's Épée | 3rd |
| 01/25/2013 | Legnano, Italy | Individual Men's Épée | 3rd |
| 02/14/2014 | Heidenheim, Germany | Individual Men's Épée | 2nd |
| 11/17/2017 | Legnano, Italy | Individual Men's Épée | 1st |
| 03/22/2019 | Buenos Aires, Argentina | Individual Men's Épée | 3rd |

=== Awards ===
- Junior Príma award (2009)
- Member of Hungarian fencing team of the Year (2): 2008, 2009
- Hungarian Fencer of the Year (1): 2014

Orders and special awards

- Badge of Honour – Silver Cross (2014)
- Cross of Merit of Hungary – Golden Cross (2016)
