= Andrea Santarelli =

Italian fencer (born 1993)

Personal information
- Nationality: Italian
- Born: 3 June 1993 (age 33) Foligno, Italy
- Height: 1.84 m (6 ft 0 in)
- Weight: 76 kg (168 lb)

Fencing career
- Sport: Fencing
- Country: Italy
- Weapon: Épée
- Club: Fiamme Oro
- FIE ranking: current ranking
Medal record
Men's épée
Representing Italy
Olympic Games
Silver medal – second place	2016 Rio de Janeiro	Team
World Championships
Gold medal – first place	2023 Milan	Team
Silver medal – second place	2022 Cairo	Team
Bronze medal – third place	2019 Budapest	Individual
European Games
Bronze medal – third place	2015 Baku	Team
Bronze medal – third place	2023 Kraków–Małopolska	Team
European Championships
Gold medal – first place	2022 Antalya	Team
Gold medal – first place	2026 Antony	Team
Silver medal – second place	2016 Toruń	Team
Silver medal – second place	2019 Düsseldorf	Individual
Silver medal – second place	2024 Basel	Team
Bronze medal – third place	2018 Novi Sad	Team
Bronze medal – third place	2023 Kraków	Team
Bronze medal – third place	2025 Genoa	Individual
Bronze medal – third place	2025 Genoa	Team

Andrea Santarelli (born 3 June 1993) is an Italian right-handed épée fencer, 2022 team European champion, two-time Olympian, and 2016 team Olympic silver medalist.

Santarelli competed in the 2016 Rio de Janeiro Olympic Games and the 2020 Tokyo Olympic Games.

== Medal record ==
=== Olympic Games ===
Year	Location	Event	Position
2016	Rio de Janeiro, Brazil	Team Men's Épée	2nd

=== World Championship ===
Year	Location	Event	Position
2019	Budapest, Hungary	Individual Men's Épée	3rd
2022	Cairo, Egypt	Team Men's Épée	2nd

=== European Championship ===
Year	Location	Event	Position
2016	Toruń, Poland	Team Men's Épée	2nd
2018	Novi Sad, Serbia	Team Men's Épée	3rd
2019	Düsseldorf, Germany	Individual Men's Épée	2nd
2022	Antalya, Turkey	Team Men's Épée	1st

=== Grand Prix ===
Date	Location	Event	Position
2017-03-24	Budapest, Hungary	Individual Men's Épée	3rd
2017-12-08	Doha, Qatar	Individual Men's Épée	3rd
2019-03-08	Budapest, Hungary	Individual Men's Épée	2nd
2020-01-24	Doha, Qatar	Individual Men's Épée	3rd

=== World Cup ===
Date	Location	Event	Position
2016-10-28	Bern, Switzerland	Individual Men's Épée	3rd
2021-11-19	Bern, Switzerland	Individual Men's Épée	3rd
