= Alexandre Bardenet =

French fencer (born 1990)

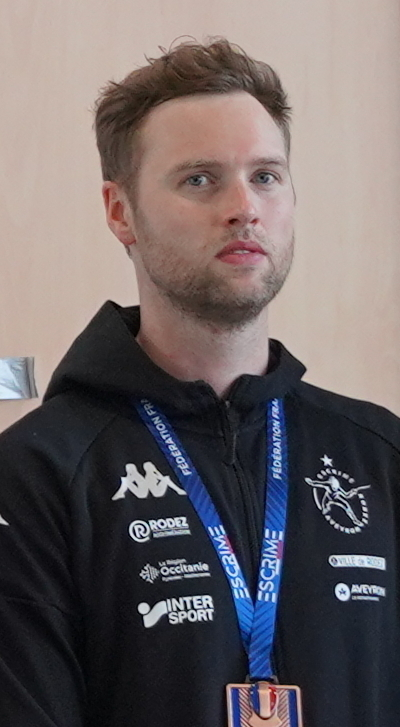

Personal information
- Born: 26 May 1990 (age 36) Saint-Saulve, France
- Height: 1.87 m (6 ft 2 in)

Fencing career
- Sport: Fencing
- Country: France
- Weapon: Épée
- Hand: right-handed
- Club: Escrime Rodez Aveyron
- FIE ranking: current ranking
Medal record
Men's épée
Representing France
World Championships
| Gold medal – first place | 2019 Budapest | Team |
| Gold medal – first place | 2022 Cairo | Team |
| Silver medal – second place | 2023 Milan | Team |
European Championships
| Gold medal – first place | 2024 Basel | Team |
| Gold medal – first place | 2025 Genoa | Team |
| Silver medal – second place | 2026 Antony | Team |
| Bronze medal – third place | 2022 Antalya | Team |

Alexandre Bardenet (born 26 May 1990) is a French right-handed professional épée fencer, two-time team world champion, and 2021 Olympian.

== Medal record ==
=== World Championship ===
| Year | Location | Event | Position |
|---|---|---|---|
| 2019 | Budapest, Hungary | Team Men's Épée | 1st |
| 2022 | Cairo, Egypt | Team Men's Épée | 1st |

=== European Championship ===
| Year | Location | Event | Position |
|---|---|---|---|
| 2022 | Antalya, Turkey | Team Men's Épée | 3rd |

=== Grand Prix ===
| Date | Location | Event | Position |
|---|---|---|---|
| 2016-12-09 | Doha, Qatar | Individual Men's Épée | 2nd |
| 2020-01-24 | Doha, Qatar | Individual Men's Épée | 2nd |

=== World Cup ===
| Date | Location | Event | Position |
|---|---|---|---|
| 2019-01-10 | Heidenheim, Germany | Individual Men's Épée | 1st |
| 2019-02-08 | Vancouver, Canada | Individual Men's Épée | 3rd |
| 2019-11-22 | Bern, Switzerland | Individual Men's Épée | 3rd |
| 2021-11-19 | Bern, Switzerland | Individual Men's Épée | 2nd |
| 2022-04-15 | Paris, France | Individual Men's Épée | 3rd |
| 2023-03-25 | Buenos Aires, Argentina | Individual Men's Épée | 1st |
