= Tennis at the 2024 Summer Olympics – Day-by-day summaries =

The 2024 Summer Olympics order of play for matches on the main courts, played from 27 July until 4 August.

All dates and times are CEST (UTC+02:00).

== Day 1 (27 July) ==
- Seeds out:
  - Women's singles: Caroline Garcia (FRA) [17]
  - Men's doubles: Máximo González (ARG) / Andrés Molteni (ARG) [6]
- Order of play

Matches on main courts
Matches on Court Philippe Chatrier (Center Court)
Event	Winner	Loser	Score
Women's singles – 1st round	Iga Świątek (POL) [1]	Irina-Camelia Begu (ROU)	6–2, 7–5
Men's singles – 1st round	Novak Djokovic (SRB) [1]	Matthew Ebden (AUS)	6–0, 6–1
Men's singles – 1st round	Taylor Fritz (USA) [7]	Alexander Bublik (KAZ)	6–4, 6–4
Men's doubles – 1st round	Carlos Alcaraz (ESP) [PR] Rafael Nadal (ESP) [PR]	Máximo González (ARG) [6] Andrés Molteni (ARG) [6]	7–6^{(7–4)}, 6–4
Women's singles – 1st round	Angelique Kerber (GER) [PR]	Naomi Osaka (JPN)	7–5, 6–3
Matches on Court Suzanne Lenglen (Grandstand)
Event	Winner	Loser	Score
Women's singles – 1st round	Jasmine Paolini (ITA) [4]	Ana Bogdan (ROU)	7–5, 6–2
Men's singles – 1st round	Carlos Alcaraz (ESP) [2]	Hady Habib (LBN)	6–3, 6–1
Women's singles – 1st round	Jaqueline Cristian (ROU)	Caroline Garcia (FRA) [17]	5–7, 6–3, 6–4
Men's singles – 1st round	Daniil Medvedev (AIN) [4]	Rinky Hijikata (AUS)	6–2, 6–1
Women's doubles – 1st round	Coco Gauff (USA) [1] Jessica Pegula (USA) [1]	Ellen Perez (AUS); Daria Saville (AUS)	6–3, 6–1
Coloured background indicates a night match
Day matches began at 12 pm; night matches begin at 7 pm CEST

== Day 2 (28 July) ==
- Seeds out:
  - Men's singles: Arthur Fils (FRA) [14], Alejandro Tabilo (CHI) [15], Nicolás Jarry (CHI) [16]
  - Women's singles: Jelena Ostapenko (LAT) [10]
  - Men's doubles: Simone Bolelli (ITA) / Andrea Vavassori (ITA) [1]
- Order of play

Matches on main courts
Matches on Court Philippe Chatrier (Center Court)
Event	Winner	Loser	Score
Women's singles – 1st round	Barbora Krejčíková (CZE) [9]	Sara Sorribes Tormo (ESP)	4–6, 6–0, 7–6^{(6–4)}
Men's singles – 1st round	Rafael Nadal (ESP) [PR]	Márton Fucsovics (HUN)	6–1, 4–6, 6–4
Women's singles – 1st round	Coco Gauff (USA) [2]	Ajla Tomljanović (AUS)	6–3, 6–0
Men's singles – 1st round	Alexander Zverev (GER) [2]	Jaume Munar (ESP)	6–2, 6–2
Matches on Court Suzanne Lenglen (Grandstand)
Event	Winner	Loser	Score
Women's singles – 1st round	Maria Sakkari (GRE) [7]	Danka Kovinić (MNE)	6–0, 6–1
Men's singles – 1st round	Casper Ruud (NOR) [6]	Taro Daniel (JPN)	7–5, 6–1
Women's singles – 1st round	Jessica Pegula (USA) [5]	Viktorija Golubic (SUI)	6–3, 6–4
Men's singles – 1st round	Lorenzo Musetti (ITA) [11]	Gaël Monfils (FRA)	6–1, 6–4
Men's doubles – 1st round	Dan Evans (GBR); Andy Murray (GBR)	Taro Daniel (JPN); Kei Nishikori (JPN)	2–6, 7–6^{(7–5)}, [11–9]
Men's doubles – 1st round	Kevin Krawietz (GER) [2] Tim Pütz (GER) [2]	Daniil Medvedev (AIN); Roman Safiullin (AIN)	6–4, 6–4
Matches on Court Simonne Mathieu
Event	Winner	Loser	Score
Men's singles – 1st round	Félix Auger-Aliassime (CAN) [13]	Marcos Giron (USA)	6–1, 6–4
Women's singles – 1st round	Danielle Collins (USA) [8]	Laura Siegemund (GER)	6–3, 2–0, ret.
Men's singles – 1st round	Stefanos Tsitsipas (GRE) [8]	Zizou Bergs (BEL)	7–6^{(8–6)}, 1–6, 6–1
Men's singles – 1st round	Stan Wawrinka (SUI)	Pavel Kotov (AIN)	6–1, 6–1
Women's singles – 1st round	Caroline Wozniacki (DEN)	Mayar Sherif (EGY)	2–6, 7–5, 6–1
Coloured background indicates a night match
Day matches began at 12 pm; night matches begin at 7 pm CEST

== Day 3 (29 July) ==
- Seeds out:
  - Men's singles: Ugo Humbert (FRA) [10]
  - Women's singles: Jessica Pegula (USA) [5], Beatriz Haddad Maia (BRA) [14], Diana Shnaider (AIN) [15]
  - Men's doubles: Joe Salisbury (GBR) / Neal Skupski (GBR) [5], Nikola Mektić (CRO) / Mate Pavić (CRO) [7], Arthur Fils (FRA) / Ugo Humbert (FRA) [8]
  - Mixed doubles: Laura Siegemund (GER) / Alexander Zverev (GER) [1], Maria Sakkari (GRE) / Stefanos Tsitsipas (GRE) [4]
- Order of play

Matches on main courts
Matches on Court Philippe Chatrier (Center Court)
Event	Winner	Loser	Score
Women's singles – 2nd round	Iga Świątek (POL) [1]	Diane Parry (FRA)	6–1, 6–1
Men's singles – 2nd round	Novak Djokovic (SRB) [1]	Rafael Nadal (ESP) [PR]	6–1, 6–4
Women's doubles – 1st round	Sara Errani (ITA) [3] Jasmine Paolini (ITA) [3]	Erin Routliffe (NZL); Lulu Sun (NZL)	6–2, 6–3
Men's singles – 2nd round	Carlos Alcaraz (ESP) [2]	Tallon Griekspoor (NED)	6–1, 7–6^{(6–3)}
Women's singles – 2nd round	Elina Svitolina (UKR)	Jessica Pegula (USA) [5]	4–6, 6–1, 6–3
Matches on Court Suzanne Lenglen (Grandstand)
Event	Winner	Loser	Score
Women's singles – 2nd round	Jasmine Paolini (ITA) [4]	Magda Linette (POL)	6–4, 6–1
Women's singles – 2nd round	Coco Gauff (USA) [2]	María Lourdes Carlé (ARG)	6–1, 6–1
Men's singles – 2nd round	Casper Ruud (NOR) [6]	Andrea Vavassori (ITA)	4–6, 6–4, 6–3
Mixed doubles – 1st round	Kateřina Siniaková (CZE); Tomáš Macháč (CZE)	Laura Siegemund (GER) [1] Alexander Zverev (GER) [1]	6–4, 7–5
Mixed doubles – 1st round	Sara Errani (ITA); Andrea Vavassori (ITA)	Mirra Andreeva (AIN); Daniil Medvedev (AIN)	6–3, 6–2
Matches on Court Simonne Mathieu
Event	Winner	Loser	Score
Women's singles – 2nd round	Barbora Krejčíková (CZE) [9]	Wang Xinyu (CHN)	6–3, 6–2
Men's singles – 2nd round	Francisco Cerúndolo (ARG)	Ugo Humbert (FRA) [10]	7–5, 6–7^{(5–7)}, 7–5
Men's singles – 2nd round	Stefanos Tsitsipas (GRE) [8]	Dan Evans (GBR)	6–1, 6–2
Men's doubles – 1st round	Austin Krajicek (USA) [3] Rajeev Ram (USA) [3]	Alex de Minaur (AUS); Alexei Popyrin (AUS)	6–2, 6–3
Mixed doubles – 1st round	Demi Schuurs (NED); Wesley Koolhof (NED)	Maria Sakkari (GRE) [4] Stefanos Tsitsipas (GRE) [4]	6–4, 7–6^{(7–5)}
Coloured background indicates a night match
Day matches began at 12 pm; night matches begin at 7 pm CEST

== Day 4 (30 July) ==
- Seeds out:
  - Women's singles: Coco Gauff (USA) [2], Jasmine Paolini (ITA) [4], Maria Sakkari (GRE) [7], Emma Navarro (USA) [11], Leylah Fernandez (CAN) [16]
  - Women's doubles: Marta Kostyuk (UKR) / Dayana Yastremska (UKR) [7]
- Order of play

Matches on main courts
Matches on Court Philippe Chatrier (Center Court)
Event	Winner	Loser	Score
Women's singles – 3rd round	Donna Vekić (CRO) [13]	Coco Gauff (USA) [2]	7–6^{(9–7)}, 6–2
Men's singles – 2nd round	Alexander Zverev (GER) [3]	Tomáš Macháč (CZE)	6–3, 7–5
Women's singles – 3rd round	Iga Świątek (POL) [1]	Wang Xiyu (CHN)	6–3, 6–4
Men's singles – 2nd round	Daniil Medvedev (AIN) [4]	Sebastian Ofner (AUT)	6–2, 6–2
Matches on Court Suzanne Lenglen (Grandstand)
Event	Winner	Loser	Score
Men's singles – 2nd round	Taylor Fritz (USA) [7]	Jack Draper (GBR)	6–7^{(3–7)}, 6–3, 6–2
Women's singles – 3rd round	Anna Karolína Schmiedlová (SVK)	Jasmine Paolini (ITA) [4]	7–5, 3–6, 7–5
Men's doubles – 2nd round	Carlos Alcaraz (ESP) [PR] Rafael Nadal (ESP) [PR]	Tallon Griekspoor (NED); Wesley Koolhof (NED)	6–4, 6–7^{(2–7)}, [10–2]
Men's doubles – 2nd round	Dan Evans (GBR); Andy Murray (GBR)	Sander Gillé (BEL); Joran Vliegen (BEL)	6–3, 6–7^{(8–10)}, [11–9]
Matches on Court Simonne Mathieu
Event	Winner	Loser	Score
Women's singles – 3rd round	Angelique Kerber (GER) [PR]	Leylah Fernandez (CAN) [16]	6–4, 6–3
Men's singles – 2nd round	Félix Auger-Aliassime (CAN) [13]	Maximilian Marterer (GER)	6–0, 6–1
Women's singles – 3rd round	Barbora Krejčíková (CZE) [9]	Elina Svitolina (UKR)	7–6^{(7–5)}, 2–6, 6–4
Mixed doubles – 1st round	Coco Gauff (USA) [3] Taylor Fritz (USA) [3]	Nadia Podoroska (ARG); Máximo González (ARG)	6–1, 6–7^{(6–8)}, [10–5]
Coloured background indicates a night match
Day matches began at 12 pm; night matches begin at 7 pm CEST

== Day 5 (31 July) ==
- Seeds out:
  - Men's singles: Daniil Medvedev (AIN) [4], Taylor Fritz (USA) [7], Sebastián Báez (ARG) [12]
  - Women's singles: Danielle Collins (USA) [8], Barbora Krejčíková (CZE) [9], Marta Kostyuk (UKR) [12]
  - Men's doubles: Kevin Krawietz (GER) / Tim Pütz (GER) [2]
  - Women's doubles: Coco Gauff (USA) / Jessica Pegula (USA) [1], Danielle Collins (USA) / Desirae Krawczyk (USA) [4], Gabriela Dabrowski (CAN) / Leylah Fernandez (CAN) [5], Beatriz Haddad Maia (BRA) / Luisa Stefani (BRA) [6]
  - Mixed doubles: Ellen Perez (AUS) / Matthew Ebden (AUS) [2], Coco Gauff (USA) / Taylor Fritz (USA) [3]
- Order of play

Matches on main courts
Matches on Court Philippe Chatrier (Center Court)
Event	Winner	Loser	Score
Men's singles – 3rd round	Novak Djokovic (SRB) [1]	Dominik Koepfer (GER)	7–5, 6–3
Women's singles – Quarterfinals	Zheng Qinwen (CHN) [6]	Angelique Kerber (GER) [PR]	7–6^{(7–4)}, 4–6, 7–6^{(8–6)}
Men's doubles – Quarterfinals	Austin Krajicek (USA) [4] Rajeev Ram (USA) [4]	Carlos Alcaraz (ESP) [PR] Rafael Nadal (ESP) [PR]	6–2, 6–4
Women's singles – Quarterfinals	Donna Vekić (CRO) [13]	Marta Kostyuk (UKR) [12]	6–4, 2–6, 7–6^{(10–8)}
Matches on Court Suzanne Lenglen (Grandstand)
Event	Winner	Loser	Score
Men's singles – 3rd round	Tommy Paul (USA) [9]	Corentin Moutet (FRA)	7–6^{(7–5)}, 6–3
Men's singles – 3rd round	Carlos Alcaraz (ESP) [2]	Roman Safiullin (AIN)	6–4, 6–2
Women's singles – Quarterfinals	Iga Świątek (POL) [1]	Danielle Collins (USA) [8]	6–1, 2–6, 4–1, ret.
Men's singles – 3rd round	Alexander Zverev (GER) [3]	Alexei Popyrin (AUS)	7–5, 6–3
Women's doubles – 2nd round	Lyudmyla Kichenok (UKR); Nadiia Kichenok (UKR)	Danielle Collins (USA) [4] Desirae Krawczyk (USA) [4]	3–6, 6–4, [10–7]
Matches on Court Simonne Mathieu
Event	Winner	Loser	Score
Men's singles – 3rd round	Stefanos Tsitsipas (GRE) [8]	Sebastián Báez (ARG) [12]	7–5, 6–1
Women's singles – Quarterfinals	Anna Karolína Schmiedlová (SVK)	Barbora Krejčíková (CZE) [9]	6–4, 6–2
Men's singles – 3rd round	Félix Auger-Aliassime (CAN) [13]	Daniil Medvedev (AIN) [4]	6–3, 7–6^{(7–5)}
Men's singles – 3rd round	Casper Ruud (NOR) [6]	Francisco Cerúndolo (ARG)	6–3, 6–4
Mixed doubles – Quarterfinals	Gabriela Dabrowski (CAN); Félix Auger-Aliassime (CAN)	Coco Gauff (USA) [3] Taylor Fritz (USA) [3]	7–6^{(7–2)}, 3–6, [10–8]
Coloured background indicates a night match
Day matches began at 12 pm; night matches begin at 7 pm CEST

== Day 6 (1 August) ==
- Seeds out:
  - Men's singles: Alexander Zverev (GER) [3], Casper Ruud (NOR) [6], Stefanos Tsitsipas (GRE) [8], Tommy Paul (USA) [9]
  - Women's singles: Iga Świątek (POL) [1]
  - Women's doubles: Barbora Krejčíková (CZE) / Kateřina Siniaková (CZE) [2]
- Order of play

Matches on main courts
Matches on Court Philippe Chatrier (Center Court)
Event	Winner	Loser	Score
Women's singles – Semifinals	Zheng Qinwen (CHN) [6]	Iga Świątek (POL) [1]	6–2, 7–5
Men's singles – Quarterfinals	Carlos Alcaraz (ESP) [2]	Tommy Paul (USA) [9]	6–3, 7–6^{(9–7)}
Men's singles – Quarterfinals	Novak Djokovic (SRB) [1]	Stefanos Tsitsipas (GRE) [8]	6–3, 7–6^{(7–3)}
Women's singles – Semifinals	Donna Vekić (CRO) [13]	Anna Karolína Schmiedlová (SVK)	6–4, 6–0
Matches on Court Suzanne Lenglen (Grandstand)
Event	Winner	Loser	Score
Women's doubles – Quarterfinals	Karolína Muchová (CZE); Linda Nosková (CZE)	Hsieh Su-wei (TPE); Tsao Chia-yi (TPE)	1–6, 6–4, [14–12]
Men's singles – Quarterfinals	Lorenzo Musetti (ITA) [11]	Alexander Zverev (GER) [3]	7–5, 7–5
Men's singles – Quarterfinals	Félix Auger-Aliassime (CAN) [13]	Casper Ruud (NOR) [6]	6–4, 6–7^{(8–10)}, 6–3
Men's doubles – Quarterfinals	Taylor Fritz (USA) [3] Tommy Paul (USA) [3]	Dan Evans (GBR); Andy Murray (GBR)	6–2, 6–4
Matches on Court Simonne Mathieu
Event	Winner	Loser	Score
Women's doubles – Quarterfinals	Sara Errani (ITA) [3] Jasmine Paolini (ITA) [3]	Katie Boulter (GBR); Heather Watson (GBR)	6–3, 6–1
Men's doubles – Semifinals	Austin Krajicek (USA) [4] Rajeev Ram (USA) [4]	Tomáš Macháč (CZE); Adam Pavlásek (CZE)	6–2, 6–2
Women's doubles – Quarterfinals	Cristina Bucșa (ESP) [8] Sara Sorribes Tormo (ESP) [8]	Lyudmyla Kichenok (UKR); Nadiia Kichenok (UKR)	6–3, 2–6, [12–10]
Mixed doubles – Semifinals	Kateřina Siniaková (CZE); Tomáš Macháč (CZE)	Gabriela Dabrowski (CAN); Félix Auger-Aliassime (CAN)	6–3, 6–2
Coloured background indicates a night match
Day matches began at 12 pm; night matches begin at 7 pm CEST

== Day 7 (2 August) ==
- Seeds out:
  - Men's singles: Lorenzo Musetti (ITA) [11], Félix Auger-Aliassime (CAN) [13]
  - Men's doubles: Taylor Fritz (USA) / Tommy Paul (USA) [3]
  - Women's doubles: Cristina Bucșa (ESP) / Sara Sorribes Tormo (ESP) [8]
- Order of play

Matches on main courts
Matches on Court Philippe Chatrier (Center Court)
Event	Winner	Loser	Score
Men's singles – Semifinals	Carlos Alcaraz (ESP) [2]	Félix Auger-Aliassime (CAN) [13]	6–1, 6–1
Women's singles – Bronze Medal Match	Iga Świątek (POL) [1]	Anna Karolína Schmiedlová (SVK)	6–2, 6–1
Men's singles – Semifinals	Novak Djokovic (SRB) [1]	Lorenzo Musetti (ITA) [11]	6-4, 6–2
Mixed doubles – Gold Medal Match	Kateřina Siniaková (CZE); Tomáš Macháč (CZE)	Wang Xinyu (CHN); Zhang Zhizhen (CHN)	6–2, 5–7, [10–8]
Matches on Court Suzanne Lenglen (Grandstand)
Event	Winner	Loser	Score
Women's doubles – Semifinals	Sara Errani (ITA) [3] Jasmine Paolini (ITA) [3]	Karolína Muchová (CZE); Linda Nosková (CZE)	6–3, 6–2
Men's doubles – Semifinals	Matthew Ebden (AUS); John Peers (AUS)	Taylor Fritz (USA) [3] Tommy Paul (USA) [3]	7–5, 6–2
Women's doubles – Semifinals	Mirra Andreeva (AIN); Diana Shnaider (AIN)	Cristina Bucșa (ESP) [8] Sara Sorribes Tormo (ESP) [8]	6–1, 6–2
Mixed doubles – Bronze Medal Match	Gabriela Dabrowski (CAN); Félix Auger-Aliassime (CAN)	Demi Schuurs (NED); Wesley Koolhof (NED)	6–3, 7–6^{(7–2)}
Coloured background indicates a night match
Day matches began at 12 pm; night matches begin at 7 pm CEST

== Day 8 (3 August) ==
- Seeds out:
  - Women's singles: Donna Vekić (CRO) [13]
  - Men's doubles: Austin Krajicek (USA) / Rajeev Ram (USA) [4]
- Order of play

Matches on main courts
Matches on Court Philippe Chatrier (Center Court)
Event	Winner	Loser	Score
Men's doubles – Gold Medal Match	Matthew Ebden (AUS); John Peers (AUS)	Austin Krajicek (USA) [4] Rajeev Ram (USA) [4]	6–7^{(6–8)}, 7–6^{(7–1)}, [10–8]
Men's doubles – Bronze Medal Match	Taylor Fritz (USA) [3] Tommy Paul (USA) [3]	Tomáš Macháč (CZE); Adam Pavlásek (CZE)	6–3, 6–4
Women's singles – Gold Medal Match	Zheng Qinwen (CHN) [6]	Donna Vekić (CRO) [13]	6–2, 6–3
Men's singles – Bronze Medal Match	Lorenzo Musetti (ITA) [11]	Félix Auger-Aliassime (CAN) [13]	6–4, 1–6, 6–3
Matches began at 12 pm CEST

== Day 9 (4 August) ==
- Seeds out:
  - Men's singles: Carlos Alcaraz (ESP) [2]
- Order of play

Matches on main courts
Matches on Court Philippe Chatrier (Center Court)
Event	Winner	Loser	Score
Women's doubles – Bronze Medal Match	Cristina Bucșa (ESP) [8] Sara Sorribes Tormo (ESP) [8]	Karolína Muchová (CZE); Linda Nosková (CZE)	6–2, 6–2
Men's singles – Gold Medal Match	Novak Djokovic (SRB) [1]	Carlos Alcaraz (ESP) [2]	7–6^{(7–3)}, 7–6^{(7–2)}
Women's doubles – Gold Medal Match	Sara Errani (ITA) [3] Jasmine Paolini (ITA) [3]	Mirra Andreeva (AIN); Diana Shnaider (AIN)	2–6, 6–1, [10–7]
Matches began at 12 pm CEST
