= 2024 ITF World Tennis Tour Gran Canaria – Singles =

Singles
- 2024 ITF World Tennis Tour Gran Canaria

Final
- Champion: (Spain) Nuria Párrizas Díaz
- Runner-up: (Spain) Andrea Lázaro García
- Score: 6–4, 6–3

Events
Singles	Doubles
← 2023 ·	ITF World Tennis Tour Gran Canaria	· 2025 →

Julia Grabher was the defending champion but chose to compete at the Olympic Games instead.

Nuria Párrizas Díaz won the title, defeating Andrea Lázaro García in the final, 6–4, 6–3.

== Seeds ==
1. (Spain) Jéssica Bouzas Maneiro (semifinals)
2. (Spain) Marina Bassols Ribera (semifinals)
3. (Czech Republic) Sára Bejlek (second round, withdrew)
4. (Spain) Nuria Párrizas Díaz (champion)
5. (France) Léolia Jeanjean (second round)
6. Polina Kudermetova (quarterfinals)
7. (France) Carole Monnet (second round, retired)
8. (Croatia) Lea Bošković (quarterfinals)

== Draw ==
=== Key ===
- Q = Qualifier
- WC = Wild card
- LL = Lucky loser
- Alt = Alternate
- SE = Special exempt
- PR = Protected ranking
- ITF = ITF entry
- JE = Junior exempt
- w/o = Walkover
- r = Retired
- d = Defaulted
- SR = Special ranking

=== Finals ===
Semifinals
1	(Spain) Jéssica Bouzas Maneiro	1	4
(Spain) Andrea Lázaro García	6	6
4	(Spain) Nuria Párrizas Díaz	6	7
2	(Spain) Marina Bassols Ribera	1	5

Final
(Spain) Andrea Lázaro García	4	3
4	(Spain) Nuria Párrizas Díaz	6	6

=== Top half ===
First round
1	(Spain) J Bouzas Maneiro	6	6
(Italy) C Rosatello	0	1
(Australia) S Mendez	6	6
WC	(Spain) C Martínez Círez	3	2
Q	V Kan	6	4	2
(Switzerland) J Teichmann	3	6	6
WC	(Spain) A Bolsova	4	6^{5}
6	P Kudermetova	6	7^{7}
3	(Czech Republic) S Bejlek	6	4	6
(Spain) Á Fita Boluda	4	6	4
Q	(United Kingdom) F Christie	1	2
(Spain) A Lázaro García	6	6
(Italy) M Tona	3	0
(Hungary) F Stollár	6	6
WC	(Mexico) M Portillo Ramírez	1	2
7	(France) C Monnet	6	6

Second round
1	(Spain) J Bouzas Maneiro	6	6
(Australia) S Mendez	3	2
(Switzerland) J Teichmann	1	4
6	P Kudermetova	6	6
3	(Czech Republic) S Bejlek
(Spain) A Lázaro García	w/o
(Hungary) F Stollár	3
7	(France) C Monnet	0^{r}

Quarterfinals
1	(Spain) J Bouzas Maneiro	7	5	6
6	P Kudermetova	5	7	4
(Spain) A Lázaro García	7^{7}	6
(Hungary) F Stollár	6^{4}	1

Semifinals
1	(Spain) J Bouzas Maneiro	1	4
(Spain) A Lázaro García	6	6

=== Bottom half ===
First round
5	(France) L Jeanjean	6	6
Q	(Spain) A Geerlings	3	4
Q	(Germany) L Papadakis	6	6
Q	(Czech Republic) J Malečková	3	2
(Italy) G Pedone	6	6
Q	(Spain) C Díaz Adrover	3	2
(France) A Hesse	2	4
4	(Spain) N Párrizas Díaz	6	6
8	(Croatia) L Bošković	6	6
(Switzerland) L Küng	4	3
(China) X You	2	4
(Spain) L Cortez Llorca	6	6
Q	(China) Q Tang	4	2
Q	(Netherlands) D Tran	6	6
WC	(Belgium) Y Bonaventure	1	0
2	(Spain) M Bassols Ribera	6	6

Second round
5	(France) L Jeanjean	5	2
Q	(Germany) L Papadakis	7	6
(Italy) G Pedone	2	2
4	(Spain) N Párrizas Díaz	6	6
8	(Croatia) L Bošković	6	6
(Spain) L Cortez Llorca	4	0
Q	(Netherlands) D Tran	0	3
2	(Spain) M Bassols Ribera	6	6

Quarterfinals
Q	(Germany) L Papadakis	1	1
4	(Spain) N Párrizas Díaz	6	6
8	(Croatia) L Bošković	5	6	3
2	(Spain) M Bassols Ribera	7	3	6

Semifinals
4	(Spain) N Párrizas Díaz	6	7
2	(Spain) M Bassols Ribera	1	5
