= 2023 ITF World Tennis Tour Gran Canaria =

Tennis tournament

- Date: 7–13 August 2023
- Edition: 5th
- Category: ITF Women's World Tennis Tour
- Prize money: $100,000
- Surface: Clay / Outdoor
- Location: Maspalomas, Spain

Champions

Singles
- (Austria) Julia Grabher

Doubles
- (Hungary) Tímea Babos / (Hungary) Anna Bondár
- ITF World Tennis Tour Gran Canaria

The 2023 ITF World Tennis Tour Gran Canaria was a professional tennis tournament played on outdoor clay courts. It was the fifth edition of the tournament, which was part of the 2023 ITF Women's World Tennis Tour. It took place in Maspalomas, Spain, between 7 and 13 August 2023.

== Champions ==
=== Singles ===
- (Austria) Julia Grabher def. (Spain) Jéssica Bouzas Maneiro, 6–4, 6–4

=== Doubles ===
- (Hungary) Tímea Babos / (Hungary) Anna Bondár def. (Spain) Leyre Romero Gormaz / (Netherlands) Arantxa Rus, 6–4, 3–6, [10–4]

== Singles main draw entrants ==
=== Seeds ===
| Country | Player | Rank | Seed |
|---|---|---|---|
| NED | Arantxa Rus | 42 | 1 |
| AUT | Julia Grabher | 63 | 2 |
| MNE | Danka Kovinić | 96 | 3 |
| ITA | Sara Errani | 119 | 4 |
| SLO | Tamara Zidanšek | 128 | 5 |
| HUN | Anna Bondár | 132 | 6 |
| | Polina Kudermetova | 155 | 7 |
| ESP | Jéssica Bouzas Maneiro | 157 | 8 |

- Rankings are as of 31 July 2023.

=== Other entrants ===
The following players received wildcards into the singles main draw:

- (Spain) Lucía Cortez Llorca
- (Slovenia) Polona Hercog
- (Spain) Claudia Hoste Ferrer
- (United States) Kaitlin Quevedo

The following players received entry from the qualifying draw:

- Amina Anshba
- (Spain) Yvonne Cavallé Reimers
- (Bulgaria) Lia Karatancheva
- (Ukraine) Oleksandra Oliynykova
- (Italy) Georgia Pedone
- (Chile) Daniela Seguel
- (Germany) Natalia Siedliska
- Anastasia Zolotareva
