= 2023 ITF World Tennis Tour Gran Canaria – Singles =

Singles
- 2023 ITF World Tennis Tour Gran Canaria

Final
- Champion: (Austria) Julia Grabher
- Runner-up: (Spain) Jéssica Bouzas Maneiro
- Score: 6–4, 6–4

Events
Singles	Doubles
← 2022 ·	ITF World Tennis Tour Gran Canaria	· 2024 →

Arantxa Rus was the defending champion but lost in the semifinals to Jéssica Bouzas Maneiro.

Julia Grabher won the title, defeating Bouzas Maneiro in the final, 6–4, 6–4.

== Seeds ==
1. (Netherlands) Arantxa Rus (semifinals)
2. (Austria) Julia Grabher (champion)
3. (Montenegro) Danka Kovinić (first round)
4. (Italy) Sara Errani (quarterfinals)
5. (Slovenia) Tamara Zidanšek (semifinals)
6. (Hungary) Anna Bondár (second round)
7. Polina Kudermetova (quarterfinals)
8. (Spain) Jéssica Bouzas Maneiro (final)

== Draw ==
=== Key ===
- Q = Qualifier
- WC = Wild card
- LL = Lucky loser
- Alt = Alternate
- SE = Special exempt
- PR = Protected ranking
- ITF = ITF entry
- JE = Junior exempt
- w/o = Walkover
- r = Retired
- d = Defaulted
- SR = Special ranking

=== Finals ===
Semifinals
1	(Netherlands) Arantxa Rus	6^{7}	2
8	(Spain) Jéssica Bouzas Maneiro	7^{9}	6
5	(Slovenia) Tamara Zidanšek	6	2	0
2	(Austria) Julia Grabher	4	6	6

Final
8	(Spain) Jéssica Bouzas Maneiro	4	4
2	(Austria) Julia Grabher	6	6

=== Top half ===
First round
1	(Netherlands) A Rus	7	6
(Hungary) T Babos	5	2
(Italy) N Brancaccio	6	6
Q	A Zolotareva	4	4
WC	(Slovenia) P Hercog	6	6
Q	A Anshba	2	4
WC	(United States) K Quevedo	1	2
6	(Hungary) A Bondár	6	6
3	(Montenegro) D Kovinić	2	3
(Netherlands) S Lamens	6	6
Q	(Bulgaria) L Karatancheva	6	7
(Greece) M Matoula	4	5
Q	(Italy) G Pedone	6	6
(Spain) L Romero Gormaz	3	4
Q	(Spain) Y Cavallé Reimers	3	3
8	(Spain) J Bouzas Maneiro	6	6

Second round
1	(Netherlands) A Rus	6	6
(Italy) N Brancaccio	2	0
WC	(Slovenia) P Hercog	7^{7}	5	6
6	(Hungary) A Bondár	6^{2}	7	3
(Netherlands) S Lamens	6	7^{7}
(Bulgaria) L Karatancheva	3	6^{4}
Q	(Italy) G Pedone	3	1
8	(Spain) J Bouzas Maneiro	6	6

Quarterfinals
1	(Netherlands) A Rus	6	1	6
WC	(Slovenia) P Hercog	3	6	0
(Netherlands) S Lamens	1	6	1
8	(Spain) J Bouzas Maneiro	6	3	6

Semifinals
1	(Netherlands) A Rus	6^{7}	2
8	(Spain) J Bouzas Maneiro	7^{9}	6

=== Bottom half ===
First round
5	(Slovenia) T Zidanšek	6	6
(Serbia) L Radivojević	2	1
Q	(Chile) D Seguel	6	6
Q	(Germany) N Siedliska	4	0
(Burundi) S Nahimana	2	5
Q	(Ukraine) O Oliynykova	6	7
(Malta) F Curmi	1	4
4	(Italy) S Errani	6	6
7	P Kudermetova	6	7
WC	(Spain) C Hoste Ferrer	4	5
(Romania) I Bara	6	6
WC	(Spain) L Cortez Llorca	2	2
(France) C Paquet	0	6	6
(Hungary) RL Jani	6	4	1
(Spain) I Burillo Escorihuela	1	1
2	(Austria) J Grabher	6	6

Second round
5	(Slovenia) T Zidanšek	6	6
Q	(Chile) D Seguel	3	2
Q	(Ukraine) O Oliynykova	2	4
4	(Italy) S Errani	6	6
7	P Kudermetova	6	6
(Romania) I Bara	3	3
(France) C Paquet	6	4	0
2	(Austria) J Grabher	4	6	6

Quarterfinals
5	(Slovenia) T Zidanšek	7	7^{7}
4	(Italy) S Errani	5	6^{5}
7	P Kudermetova	1	2
2	(Austria) J Grabher	6	6

Semifinals
5	(Slovenia) T Zidanšek	6	2	0
2	(Austria) J Grabher	4	6	6
