= 2024 ITF World Tennis Tour Gran Canaria =

Tennis tournament

- Date: 29 July–4 August 2024
- Edition: 6th
- Category: ITF Women's World Tennis Tour
- Prize money: $100,000
- Surface: Clay / Outdoor
- Location: Maspalomas, Spain

Champions

Singles
- (Spain) Nuria Párrizas Díaz

Doubles
- (Poland) Katarzyna Piter / (Hungary) Fanny Stollár
- ITF World Tennis Tour Gran Canaria

The 2024 ITF World Tennis Tour Gran Canaria was a professional tennis tournament played on outdoor clay courts. It was the sixth edition of the tournament, which was part of the 2024 ITF Women's World Tennis Tour. It took place in Maspalomas, Spain, between 29 July and 4 August 2024.

== Champions ==
=== Singles ===
- (Spain) Nuria Párrizas Díaz def. (Spain) Andrea Lázaro García, 6–4, 6–3

=== Doubles ===
- (Poland) Katarzyna Piter / (Hungary) Fanny Stollár def. (Italy) Angelica Moratelli / (United States) Sabrina Santamaria, 6–4, 6–2

== Singles main draw entrants ==
=== Seeds ===
Country	Player	Rank	Seed
ESP	Jéssica Bouzas Maneiro	81	1
ESP	Marina Bassols Ribera	122	2
CZE	Sára Bejlek	125	3
ESP	Nuria Párrizas Díaz	137	4
FRA	Léolia Jeanjean	154	5
	Polina Kudermetova	175	6
FRA	Carole Monnet	196	7
CRO	Lea Bošković	202	8

- Rankings are as of 22 July 2024.

=== Other entrants ===
The following players received wildcards into the singles main draw:

- (Spain) Aliona Bolsova
- (Belgium) Ysaline Bonaventure
- (Spain) Carlota Martínez Círez
- (Mexico) María Portillo Ramírez

The following players received entry from the qualifying draw:

- (United Kingdom) Freya Christie
- (Spain) Cristina Díaz Adrover
- (Spain) Ariana Geerlings
- Victoria Kan
- (Czech Republic) Jesika Malečková
- (Germany) Lena Papadakis
- (China) Tang Qianhui
- (Netherlands) Demi Tran
