= 2024 ITF World Tennis Tour Gran Canaria – Doubles =

Doubles
- 2024 ITF World Tennis Tour Gran Canaria

Final
- Champions: (Poland) Katarzyna Piter (Hungary) Fanny Stollár
- Runners-up: (Italy) Angelica Moratelli (United States) Sabrina Santamaria
- Score: 6–4, 6–2

Events
Singles	Doubles
← 2023 ·	ITF World Tennis Tour Gran Canaria	· 2025 →

Tímea Babos and Anna Bondár were the defending champions but Babos chose not to participate this week, whilst Bondár competes at the 2024 Ladies Open Hechingen instead.

Katarzyna Piter and Fanny Stollár won the title, defeating Angelica Moratelli and Sabrina Santamaria in the final, 6–4, 6–2.

== Seeds ==
1. (Italy) Angelica Moratelli / (United States) Sabrina Santamaria (final)
2. (Poland) Katarzyna Piter / (Hungary) Fanny Stollár (champions)
3. (Italy) Camilla Rosatello / (Belgium) Kimberley Zimmermann (first round)
4. (Czech Republic) Miriam Kolodziejová / (Czech Republic) Jesika Malečková (quarterfinals)

== Draw ==
=== Key ===
- Q = Qualifier
- WC = Wild card
- LL = Lucky loser
- Alt = Alternate
- SE = Special exempt
- PR = Protected ranking
- ITF = ITF entry
- JE = Junior exempt
- w/o = Walkover
- r = Retired
- d = Defaulted
- SR = Special ranking

First round
1	(Italy) A Moratelli (United States) S Santamaria	6	6
(Spain) L Cortez Llorca (Germany) M Hodzic	3	2
(Belgium) Y Bonaventure (France) L Jeanjean	1	4
(Poland) W Falkowska (France) C Monnet	6	6
4	(Czech Republic) M Kolodziejová (Czech Republic) J Malečková	3	6	[10]
(Spain) A Bolsova (Spain) Á Fita Boluda	6	2	[5]
(Italy) G Pedone (Italy) M Tona	2	3
(United States) A Rogers (China) Q Tang	6	6
(United States) J Aney (Germany) L Papadakis	6	6
(Australia) S Mendez (Mexico) M Portillo Ramírez	4	1
(Switzerland) L Küng (India) V Shinde	6	6
3	(Italy) C Rosatello (Belgium) K Zimmermann	4	3
WC	(Spain) M García Reboredo Montesdeoca; A Semenova	2	1
(Spain) M Bassols Ribera (China) S Feng	6	6
(United Kingdom) F Christie (Colombia) Y Lizarazo	2	6^{3}
2	(Poland) K Piter (Hungary) F Stollár	6	7^{7}

Quarterfinals
1	(Italy) A Moratelli (United States) S Santamaria	6^{3}	6	[10]
(Poland) W Falkowska (France) C Monnet	7^{7}	3	[8]
4	(Czech Republic) M Kolodziejová (Czech Republic) J Malečková	6	6
(United States) A Rogers (China) Q Tang	1	2
(United States) J Aney (Germany) L Papadakis	7^{7}	6
(Switzerland) L Küng (India) V Shinde	6^{3}	3
(Spain) M Bassols Ribera (China) S Feng	3	5
2	(Poland) K Piter (Hungary) F Stollár	6	7

Semifinals
1	(Italy) A Moratelli (United States) S Santamaria	5	6	[11]
4	(Czech Republic) M Kolodziejová (Czech Republic) J Malečková	7	4	[9]
(United States) J Aney (Germany) L Papadakis	2	3
2	(Poland) K Piter (Hungary) F Stollár	6	6

Final
1	(Italy) A Moratelli (United States) S Santamaria	4	2
2	(Poland) K Piter (Hungary) F Stollár	6	6
