= 2023 ITF World Tennis Tour Gran Canaria – Doubles =

Doubles
- 2023 ITF World Tennis Tour Gran Canaria

Final
- Champions: (Hungary) Tímea Babos (Hungary) Anna Bondár
- Runners-up: (Spain) Leyre Romero Gormaz (Netherlands) Arantxa Rus
- Score: 6–4, 3–6, [10–4]

Events
Singles	Doubles
← 2022 ·	ITF World Tennis Tour Gran Canaria	· 2024 →

Jéssica Bouzas Maneiro and Leyre Romero Gormaz were the defending champions but Bouzas Maneiro chose not to participate.

Romero Gormaz partnered alongside Arantxa Rus, but lost in the final to Tímea Babos and Anna Bondár, 4–6, 6–3, [4–10].

== Seeds ==
1. (Hungary) Tímea Babos / (Hungary) Anna Bondár (champions)
2. Amina Anshba / Sofya Lansere (semifinals)
3. (Netherlands) Suzan Lamens / (Netherlands) Bibiane Schoofs (quarterfinals)
4. (Spain) Leyre Romero Gormaz / (Netherlands) Arantxa Rus (final)

== Draw ==
=== Key ===
- Q = Qualifier
- WC = Wild card
- LL = Lucky loser
- Alt = Alternate
- SE = Special exempt
- PR = Protected ranking
- ITF = ITF entry
- JE = Junior exempt
- w/o = Walkover
- r = Retired
- d = Defaulted
- SR = Special ranking

First round
1	(Hungary) T Babos (Hungary) A Bondár	6	6
(Germany) A Gabric (Greece) M Matoula	0	4
(Romania) I Bara (Italy) S Errani	1	2
(United Kingdom) E Appleton (Netherlands) I Haverlag	6	6
3	(Netherlands) S Lamens (Netherlands) B Schoofs	6	1	[10]
(Greece) E Christofi (Malta) F Curmi	3	6	[7]
(Italy) N Brancaccio (Italy) A Zantedeschi	4	4
(Burundi) S Nahimana (India) P Thombare	6	6
(Spain) L Cortez Llorca (Spain) C Hoste Ferrer	6	6
P Kudermetova (Serbia) L Radivojević	2	2
(Romania) KP Bejenaru (Germany) N Siedliska	4	6	[5]
4	(Spain) L Romero Gormaz (Netherlands) A Rus	6	4	[10]
(Spain) Y Cavallé Reimers; A Zolotareva	6	6
WC	(Spain) J Hernández Miranda (Spain) G Paun	4	2
(Bulgaria) L Karatancheva (United States) K Quevedo	0	0
2	A Anshba; S Lansere	6	6

Quarterfinals
1	(Hungary) T Babos (Hungary) A Bondár	6	6
(United Kingdom) E Appleton (Netherlands) I Haverlag	3	2
3	(Netherlands) S Lamens (Netherlands) B Schoofs	7	3	[8]
(Burundi) S Nahimana (India) P Thombare	5	6	[10]
(Spain) L Cortez Llorca (Spain) C Hoste Ferrer	4	1
4	(Spain) L Romero Gormaz (Netherlands) A Rus	6	6
(Spain) Y Cavallé Reimers; A Zolotareva	4	6	[7]
2	A Anshba; S Lansere	6	3	[10]

Semifinals
1	(Hungary) T Babos (Hungary) A Bondár	6	6
(Burundi) S Nahimana (India) P Thombare	3	2
4	(Spain) L Romero Gormaz (Netherlands) A Rus	6	6
2	A Anshba; S Lansere	3	4

Final
1	(Hungary) T Babos (Hungary) A Bondár	6	3	[10]
4	(Spain) L Romero Gormaz (Netherlands) A Rus	4	6	[4]
