= Tennis at the 2024 Summer Olympics – Men's doubles =

Men's doubles at the Games of the XXXIII Olympiad
- Olympic tennis pictogram
- Venue: Stade Roland Garros
- Dates: 27 July – 3 August
- Competitors: 64 from 23 nations
- Teams: 32

Medalists
1st place, gold medalist(s)		Matthew Ebden; John Peers	Australia
2nd place, silver medalist(s)		Austin Krajicek; Rajeev Ram	United States
3rd place, bronze medalist(s)		Taylor Fritz; Tommy Paul	United States

Men's doubles
- Tennis at the 2024 Summer Olympics

Final
- Champions: (Australia) Matthew Ebden (Australia) John Peers
- Runners-up: (United States) Austin Krajicek (United States) Rajeev Ram
- Score: 6–7^{(6–8)}, 7–6^{(7–1)}, [10–8]

Events
Singles	men	women
Doubles	men	women	mixed
Qualification
- Summer Olympics

Australia's Matthew Ebden and John Peers defeated the United States' Austin Krajicek and Rajeev Ram in the final, 6–7^{(6–8)}, 7–6^{(7–1)}, [10–8] to win the gold medal in men's doubles tennis at the 2024 Summer Olympics. It was Australia's first Olympic gold medal in tennis since 1996. Ebden and Peers were the first unseeded pair to win the gold medal since Fernando González and Nicolás Massú in 2004. (Note: Ebden was the World No. 3 doubles player during the time of the tournament. However, since seedings were determined by the combined ranking of the pair, Ebden and Peers were unseeded due to Peers being ranked No. 59 at the time.) In the bronze medal match, Taylor Fritz and Tommy Paul of the United States defeated Czechia's Tomáš Macháč and Adam Pavlásek, 6–3, 6–4.

The men's doubles tennis event at the 2024 Summer Olympics took place from 27 July to 3 August 2024 at the Stade Roland Garros, in Paris, France. In the event, 64 players (32 teams) from 23 nations participated in the draw.

Croatia's Nikola Mektić and Mate Pavić were the defending champions from 2021, but they lost in the first round to Dominik Koepfer and Jan-Lennard Struff of Germany.

This tournament marked the final professional appearance of former singles World No. 1, two-time singles gold medalist, and three-time major champion Andy Murray of Great Britain. Partnering Dan Evans, he lost in the quarterfinals to Fritz and Paul.

== Qualification ==
Each National Olympic Committee (NOC) can enter up to two teams. Qualification for the men's doubles is primarily through the ATP ranking list. There are 32 quota places available for men's doubles.

== Competition format ==
The competition was a single-elimination tournament with a bronze medal match. Matches are best-of-3 sets. A tiebreak was played in the first two sets reaching 6–6, while the third set will be a single tiebreak until one team scores ten points, while being two points clear.

== Schedule ==
The schedule is as follows.

Legend
R64	Round of 64	R32	Round of 32	R16	Round of 16	QF	Quarter-finals	SF	Semi-finals	BM	Bronze medal match	F	Final

Schedule
Sat 27	Sun 28	Mon 29	Tue 30	Wed 31	Thu 1	Fri 2	Sat 3
R32		R16	¼	½		BM	F

== Seeds ==
The seeds were released on 23 July 2024.

1. Simone Bolelli (ITA) / Andrea Vavassori (ITA) (first round)
2. Kevin Krawietz (GER) / Tim Pütz (GER) (quarterfinals)
3. Taylor Fritz (USA) / Tommy Paul (USA) (semifinals, bronze medalists)
4. Austin Krajicek (USA) / Rajeev Ram (USA) (final, silver medalists)
5. Joe Salisbury (GBR) / Neal Skupski (GBR) (first round)
6. Máximo González (ARG) / Andrés Molteni (ARG) (first round)
7. Nikola Mektić (CRO) / Mate Pavić (CRO) (first round)
8. Arthur Fils (FRA) / Ugo Humbert (FRA) (first round)

== Draw ==
The draw was held on 25 July 2024.

Key

- Q = Qualifier
- WC = Wild card
- LL = Lucky loser
- Alt = Alternate
- ITF = ITF entry
- PR = Protected ranking
- SR = Special ranking
- SE = Special exempt
- JE = Junior exempt
- JR = Junior Accelerator Programme entrant
- CO = College Accelerator Programme entrant
- NG = Next Gen Accelerator Program entrant
- w/o = Walkover
- r = Retired
- d = Defaulted

Flag icon key	List of National Flags

=== Finals ===
Semifinals
Matthew Ebden (AUS); John Peers (AUS)	7	6
3	Taylor Fritz (USA); Tommy Paul (USA)	5	2
4	Austin Krajicek (USA); Rajeev Ram (USA)	6	6
Tomáš Macháč (CZE); Adam Pavlásek (CZE)	2	2

Gold medal match
Matthew Ebden (AUS); John Peers (AUS)	6^{6}	7^{7}	[10]
4	Austin Krajicek (USA); Rajeev Ram (USA)	7^{8}	6^{1}	[8]
Bronze medal match
3	Taylor Fritz (USA); Tommy Paul (USA)	6	6
Tomáš Macháč (CZE); Adam Pavlásek (CZE)	3	4

=== Top half ===
First round
1	S Bolelli (ITA); A Vavassori (ITA)	6	6^{5}	[7]
PR	P Carreño Busta (ESP); M Granollers (ESP)	2	7^{7}	[10]
H Habib (LBN); B Hassan (LBN)	6^{5}	2
M Ebden (AUS); J Peers (AUS)	7^{7}	6
S Tsitsipas (GRE); Pe Tsitsipas (GRE)	6	3	[10]
N Borges (POR); F Cabral (POR)	3	6	[12]
D Koepfer (GER); J-L Struff (GER)	6	6^{5}	[10]
7	N Mektić (CRO); M Pavić (CRO)	3	7^{7}	[5]
3	T Fritz (USA); T Paul (USA)	7^{16}	6
PR	F Auger-Aliassime (CAN); M Raonic (CAN)	6^{14}	4
R Haase (NED); J-J Rojer (NED)	7^{7}	7^{7}
Alt	T Etcheverry (ARG); M Navone (ARG)	6^{3}	6^{4}
Alt	T Daniel (JPN); K Nishikori (JPN)	6	6^{5}	[9]
D Evans (GBR); A Murray (GBR)	2	7^{7}	[11]
S Gillé (BEL); J Vliegen (BEL)	7	6
8	A Fils (FRA); U Humbert (FRA)	5	4

Second round
PR	P Carreño Busta (ESP); M Granollers (ESP)	2	5
M Ebden (AUS); J Peers (AUS)	6	7
N Borges (POR); F Cabral (POR)	2	2
D Koepfer (GER); J-L Struff (GER)	6	6
3	T Fritz (USA); T Paul (USA)	6	6
R Haase (NED); J-J Rojer (NED)	3	4
D Evans (GBR); A Murray (GBR)	6	6^{8}	[11]
S Gillé (BEL); J Vliegen (BEL)	3	7^{10}	[9]

Quarterfinals
M Ebden (AUS); J Peers (AUS)	7^{7}	7^{7}
D Koepfer (GER); J-L Struff (GER)	6^{2}	6^{4}
3	T Fritz (USA); T Paul (USA)	6	6
D Evans (GBR); A Murray (GBR)	2	4

Semifinals
M Ebden (AUS); J Peers (AUS)	7	6
3	T Fritz (USA); T Paul (USA)	5	2

=== Bottom half ===
First round
6	M González (ARG); A Molteni (ARG)	6^{4}	4
PR	C Alcaraz (ESP); R Nadal (ESP)	7^{7}	6
T Griekspoor (NED); W Koolhof (NED)	6	6
M Fucsovics (HUN); F Marozsán (HUN)	2	3
T Monteiro (BRA); T Seyboth Wild (BRA)	6	6
A Bublik (KAZ); A Nedovyesov (KAZ)	4	4
A de Minaur (AUS); A Popyrin (AUS)	2	3
4	A Krajicek (USA); R Ram (USA)	6	6
5	J Salisbury (GBR); N Skupski (GBR)	6	3	[8]
T Macháč (CZE); A Pavlásek (CZE)	4	6	[10]
L Darderi (ITA); L Musetti (ITA)	3	7^{7}	[5]
N Jarry (CHI); A Tabilo (CHI)	6	6^{5}	[10]
S Balaji (IND); R Bopanna (IND)	5	2
Alt	G Monfils (FRA); É Roger-Vasselin (FRA)	7	6
D Medvedev (AIN); R Safiullin (AIN)	4	4
2	K Krawietz (GER); T Pütz (GER)	6	6

Second round
PR	C Alcaraz (ESP); R Nadal (ESP)	6	6^{2}	[10]
T Griekspoor (NED); W Koolhof (NED)	4	7^{7}	[2]
T Monteiro (BRA); T Seyboth Wild (BRA)	4	6^{3}
4	A Krajicek (USA); R Ram (USA)	6	7^{7}
T Macháč (CZE); A Pavlásek (CZE)	5	7^{8}	[10]
N Jarry (CHI); A Tabilo (CHI)	7	6^{6}	[4]
Alt	G Monfils (FRA); É Roger-Vasselin (FRA)	3	1
2	K Krawietz (GER); T Pütz (GER)	6	6

Quarterfinals
PR	C Alcaraz (ESP); R Nadal (ESP)	2	4
4	A Krajicek (USA); R Ram (USA)	6	6
T Macháč (CZE); A Pavlásek (CZE)	3	6	[10]
2	K Krawietz (GER); T Pütz (GER)	6	1	[5]

Semifinals
4	A Krajicek (USA); R Ram (USA)	6	6
T Macháč (CZE); A Pavlásek (CZE)	2	2
