= Tennis at the 2024 Summer Olympics – Women's doubles =

Women's doubles at the Games of the XXXIII Olympiad
- Olympic tennis pictogram
- Venue: Stade Roland Garros
- Dates: 27 July – 4 August
- Competitors: 64 from 21 nations
- Teams: 32

Medalists
| 1st place, gold medalist(s) | | Sara Errani; Jasmine Paolini | Italy |
| 2nd place, silver medalist(s) | | Mirra Andreeva; Diana Shnaider | Individual Neutral Athletes |
| 3rd place, bronze medalist(s) | | Cristina Bucșa; Sara Sorribes Tormo | Spain |

Women's doubles
- Tennis at the 2024 Summer Olympics

Final
- Champions: (Italy) Sara Errani (Italy) Jasmine Paolini
- Runners-up: Mirra Andreeva; Diana Shnaider
- Score: 2–6, 6–1, [10–7]

Events
| Singles | men | women |
| Doubles | men | women | mixed |
Qualification
- Summer Olympics

Italy's Sara Errani and Jasmine Paolini defeated the Individual Neutral Athletes' Mirra Andreeva and Diana Shnaider in the final, 2–6, 6–1, [10–7] to win the gold medal in women's doubles tennis at the 2024 Summer Olympics. It was Italy's first Olympic gold medal in tennis, and Errani completed the career Golden Slam (becoming the seventh woman to do so, after the Williams sisters, Pam Shriver, Gigi Fernández, Barbora Krejčíková, and Kateřina Siniaková) and became the oldest player, at 37 years, 97 days old, to win an Olympic gold medal in tennis. In the bronze medal match, Spain's Cristina Bucșa and Sara Sorribes Tormo defeated Czechia's Karolína Muchová and Linda Nosková, 6–2, 6–2. It was Spain's first Olympic medal in women's tennis since 2008.

The women's doubles tennis event at the 2024 Summer Olympics took place from 27 July to 4 August 2024 at the Stade Roland Garros, in Paris, France. There were 64 players (32 teams) from 21 nations.

Krejčíková and Siniaková were the defending champions from 2020, but lost in the quarterfinals to Andreeva and Shnaider. Andreeva went on to become the second youngest player to win an Olympic tennis medal at the age of 17 years, 3 months and 6 days (after Jennifer Capriati, who won Olympic gold at the women's singles event in 1992 at the age of 16 years and 132 days).

== Qualification ==
Each National Olympic Committee (NOC) can enter up to two teams. Qualification for the women's doubles is primarily through the WTA ranking list. There are 32 quota places available for women's doubles.

== Competition format ==
The competition was a single-elimination tournament with a bronze medal match. Matches are best-of-3 sets. A tiebreak was played in the first two sets reaching 6–6, while the third set was to be a single tiebreak until one team scores ten points, while being two points clear.

== Schedule ==
The schedule was as follows.

Legend
| R64 | Round of 64 | R32 | Round of 32 | R16 | Round of 16 | QF | Quarter-finals | SF | Semi-finals | BM | Bronze medal match | F | Final |

Schedule
| Sat 27 | Sun 28 | Mon 29 | Tue 30 | Wed 31 | Thu 1 | Fri 2 | Sat 3 | Sun 4 | |
|---|---|---|---|---|---|---|---|---|---|
| R32 | | R16 | | ¼ | ½ | | | BM | F |

== Seeds ==
The seeds were released on 23 July 2024.

1. Coco Gauff (USA) / Jessica Pegula (USA) (second round)
2. Barbora Krejčíková (CZE) / Kateřina Siniaková (CZE) (quarterfinals)
3. Sara Errani (ITA) / Jasmine Paolini (ITA) (champions, gold medalists)
4. Danielle Collins (USA) / Desirae Krawczyk (USA) (second round)
5. Gabriela Dabrowski (CAN) / Leylah Fernandez (CAN) (second round)
6. Beatriz Haddad Maia (BRA) / Luisa Stefani (BRA) (second round)
7. Marta Kostyuk (UKR) / Dayana Yastremska (UKR) (second round, withdrew)
8. Cristina Bucșa (ESP) / Sara Sorribes Tormo (ESP) (semifinals, bronze medalists)

== Draw ==
The draw was held on 25 July 2024.

Key

- Q = Qualifier
- WC = Wild card
- LL = Lucky loser
- Alt = Alternate
- ITF = ITF entry
- PR = Protected ranking
- SR = Special ranking
- SE = Special exempt
- JE = Junior exempt
- JR = Junior Accelerator Programme entrant
- CO = College Accelerator Programme entrant
- NG = Next Gen Accelerator Program entrant
- w/o = Walkover
- r = Retired
- d = Defaulted

| Flag icon key | List of National Flags |

=== Finals ===
Semifinals
Karolína Muchová (CZE); Linda Nosková (CZE) | 3 | 2
3 | Sara Errani (ITA); Jasmine Paolini (ITA) | 6 | 6
8 | Cristina Bucșa (ESP); Sara Sorribes Tormo (ESP) | 1 | 2
Mirra Andreeva (AIN); Diana Shnaider (AIN) | 6 | 6

Gold medal match
3 | Sara Errani (ITA); Jasmine Paolini (ITA) | 2 | 6 | [10]
Mirra Andreeva (AIN); Diana Shnaider (AIN) | 6 | 1 | [7]
Bronze medal match
Karolína Muchová (CZE); Linda Nosková (CZE) | 2 | 2
8 | Cristina Bucșa (ESP); Sara Sorribes Tormo (ESP) | 6 | 6

=== Top half ===
First round
1 | C Gauff (USA); J Pegula (USA) | 6 | 6
E Perez (AUS); D Saville (AUS) | 3 | 1
PR | E Alexandrova (AIN); E Vesnina (AIN) | 6 | 6^{5} | [6]
K Muchová (CZE); L Nosková (CZE) | 2 | 7^{7} | [10]
PR | I-C Begu (ROU); M Niculescu (ROU) | 6^{2} | 5
S-w Hsieh (TPE); C-y Tsao (TPE) | 7^{7} | 7
PR | M Linette (POL); A Rosolska (POL) | 4 | 1
7 | M Kostyuk (UKR); D Yastremska (UKR) | 6 | 6
3 | S Errani (ITA); J Paolini (ITA) | 6 | 6
E Routliffe (NZL); L Sun (NZL) | 2 | 3
A Rus (NED); D Schuurs (NED) | 7^{7} | 3 | [4]
C Garcia (FRA); D Parry (FRA) | 6^{2} | 6 | [10]
K Boulter (GBR); H Watson (GBR) | 6 | 6
PR | A Kerber (GER); L Siegemund (GER) | 2 | 3
PR | Y Yuan (CHN); S Zhang (CHN) | 4 | 4
6 | B Haddad Maia (BRA); L Stefani (BRA) | 6 | 6

Second round
1 | C Gauff (USA); J Pegula (USA) | 6 | 4 | [5]
K Muchová (CZE); L Nosková (CZE) | 2 | 6 | [10]
S-w Hsieh (TPE); C-y Tsao (TPE) | w/o
7 | M Kostyuk (UKR); D Yastremska (UKR)
3 | S Errani (ITA); J Paolini (ITA) | 5 | 6 | [10]
C Garcia (FRA); D Parry (FRA) | 7 | 3 | [8]
K Boulter (GBR); H Watson (GBR) | 6 | 6
6 | B Haddad Maia (BRA); L Stefani (BRA) | 3 | 4

Quarterfinals
K Muchová (CZE); L Nosková (CZE) | 1 | 6 | [14]
S-w Hsieh (TPE); C-y Tsao (TPE) | 6 | 4 | [12]
3 | S Errani (ITA); J Paolini (ITA) | 6 | 6
K Boulter (GBR); H Watson (GBR) | 3 | 1

Semifinals
K Muchová (CZE); L Nosková (CZE) | 3 | 2
3 | S Errani (ITA); J Paolini (ITA) | 6 | 6

=== Bottom half ===
First round
8 | C Bucșa (ESP); S Sorribes Tormo (ESP) | 6 | 6
L Bronzetti (ITA); E Cocciaretto (ITA) | 1 | 2
ML Carlé (ARG); N Podoroska (ARG) | 6 | 6
T Korpatsch (GER); T Maria (GER) | 3 | 0
L Kichenok (UKR); N Kichenok (UKR) | 6 | 6
PR | Xin Wang (CHN); S Zheng (CHN) | 1 | 4
D Papamichail (GRE); M Sakkari (GRE) | 1 | 3
4 | D Collins (USA); D Krawczyk (USA) | 6 | 6
5 | G Dabrowski (CAN); L Fernandez (CAN) | 6 | 7
C Burel (FRA); V Gracheva (FRA) | 1 | 5
M Andreeva (AIN); D Shnaider (AIN) | 6 | 2 | [10]
PR | O Gadecki (AUS); A Tomljanović (AUS) | 3 | 6 | [6]
S Aoyama (JPN); E Shibahara (JPN) | 6 | 6
A Bogdan (ROU); J Cristian (ROU) | 2 | 3
PR | H-c Chan (TPE); L Chan (TPE) | 4 | 0
2 | B Krejčíková (CZE); K Siniaková (CZE) | 6 | 6

Second round
8 | C Bucșa (ESP); S Sorribes Tormo (ESP) | 6 | 6
ML Carlé (ARG); N Podoroska (ARG) | 3 | 4
L Kichenok (UKR); N Kichenok (UKR) | 3 | 6 | [10]
4 | D Collins (USA); D Krawczyk (USA) | 6 | 4 | [7]
5 | G Dabrowski (CAN); L Fernandez (CAN) | 4 | 0
M Andreeva (AIN); D Shnaider (AIN) | 6 | 6
S Aoyama (JPN); E Shibahara (JPN) | 5 | 4
2 | B Krejčíková (CZE); K Siniaková (CZE) | 7 | 6

Quarterfinals
8 | C Bucșa (ESP); S Sorribes Tormo (ESP) | 6 | 2 | [12]
L Kichenok (UKR); N Kichenok (UKR) | 3 | 6 | [10]
M Andreeva (AIN); D Shnaider (AIN) | 6 | 7
2 | B Krejčíková (CZE); K Siniaková (CZE) | 1 | 5

Semifinals
8 | C Bucșa (ESP); S Sorribes Tormo (ESP) | 1 | 2
M Andreeva (AIN); D Shnaider (AIN) | 6 | 6

== Gallery ==
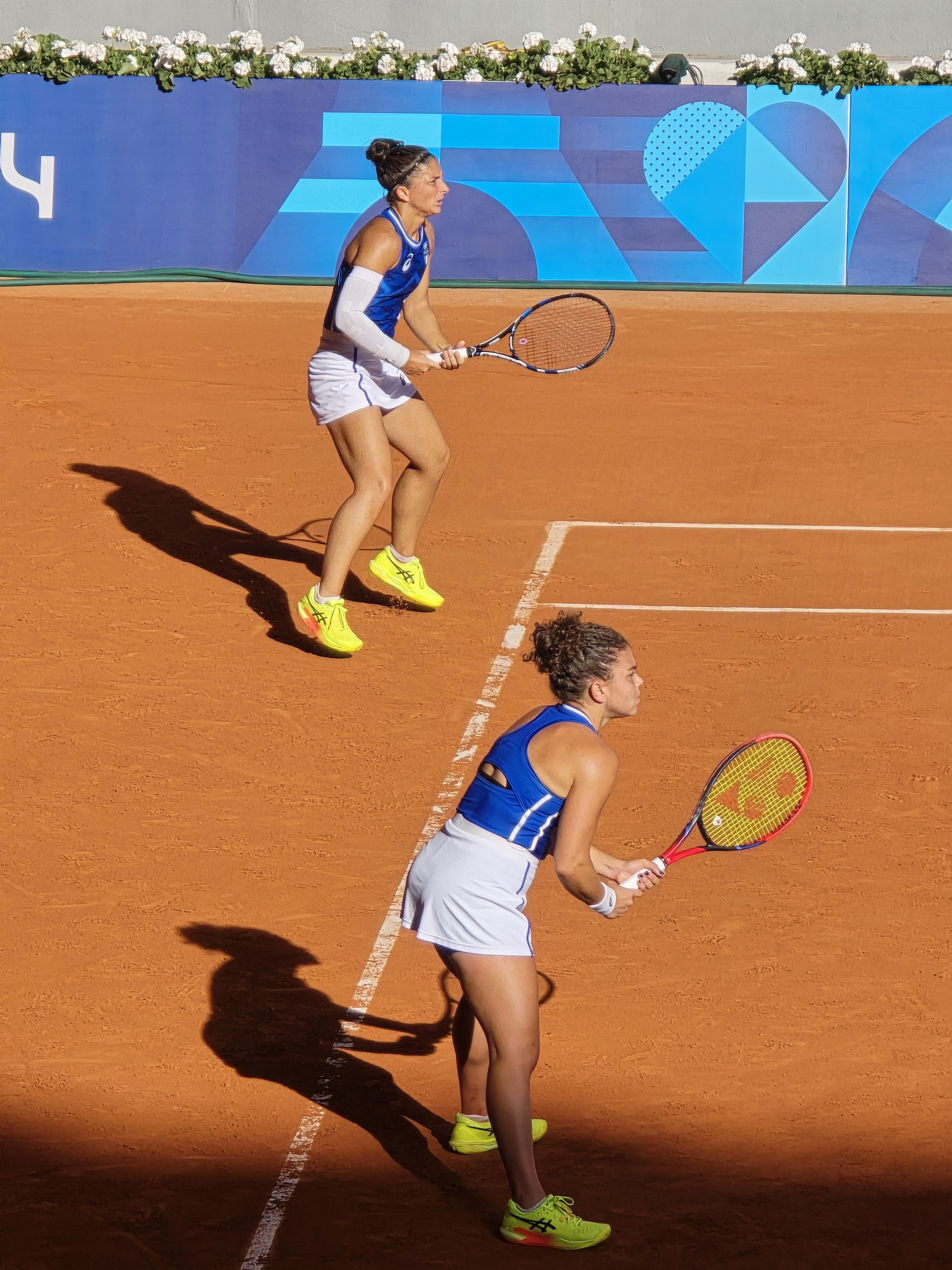
Sara Errani and Jasmine Paolini.

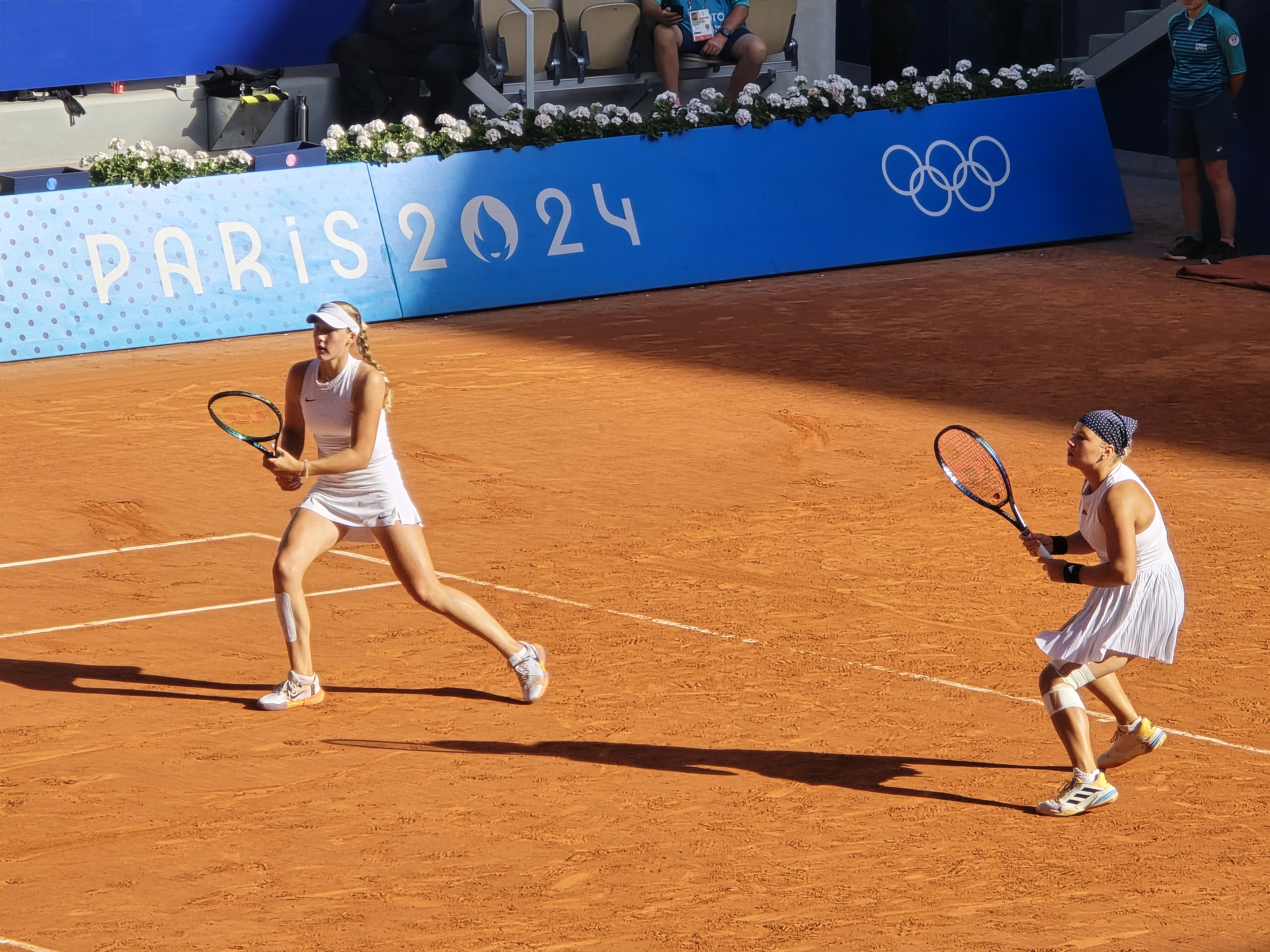
Mirra Andreeva and Diana Shnaider.

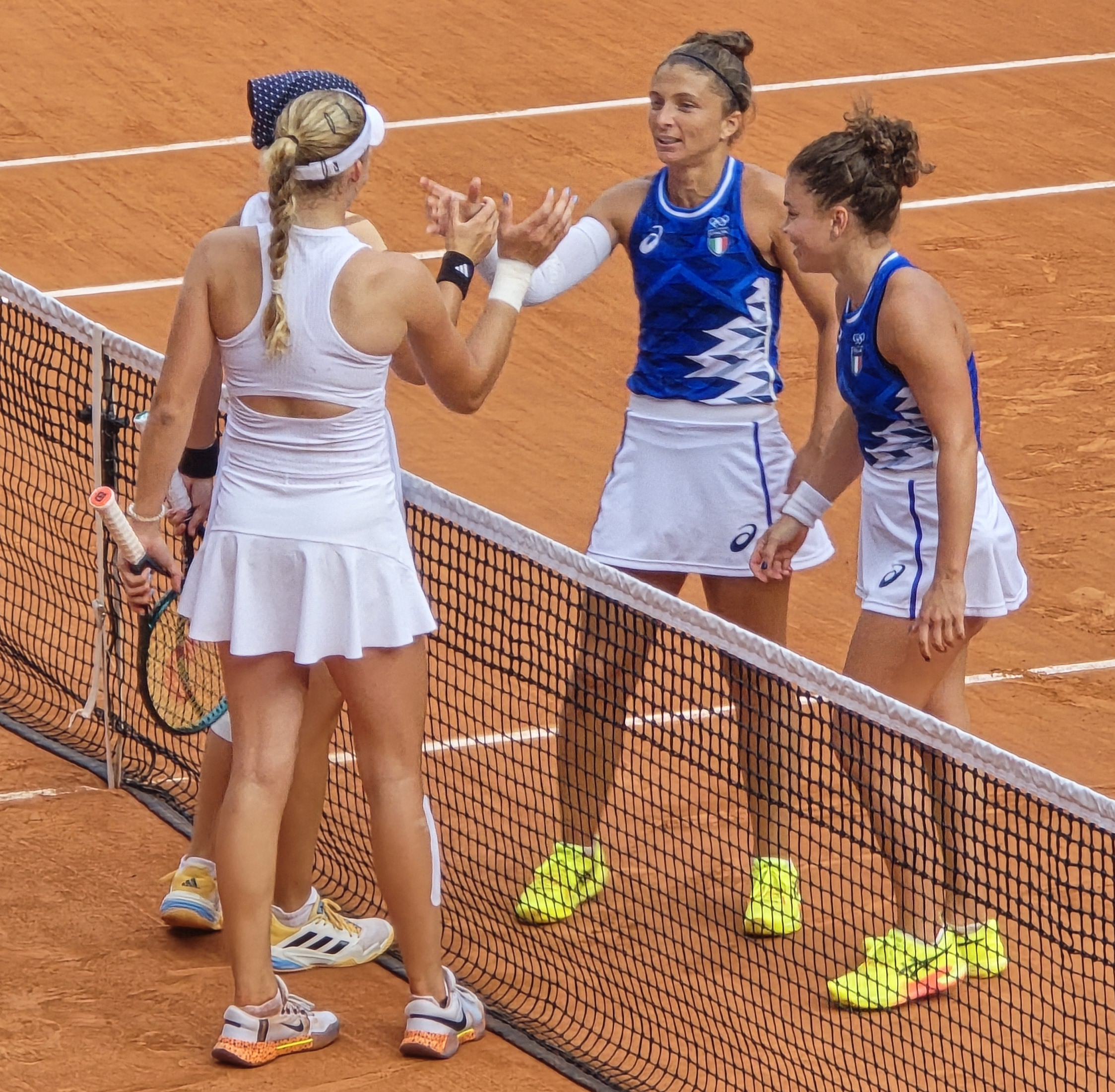
Handshake between finalists.

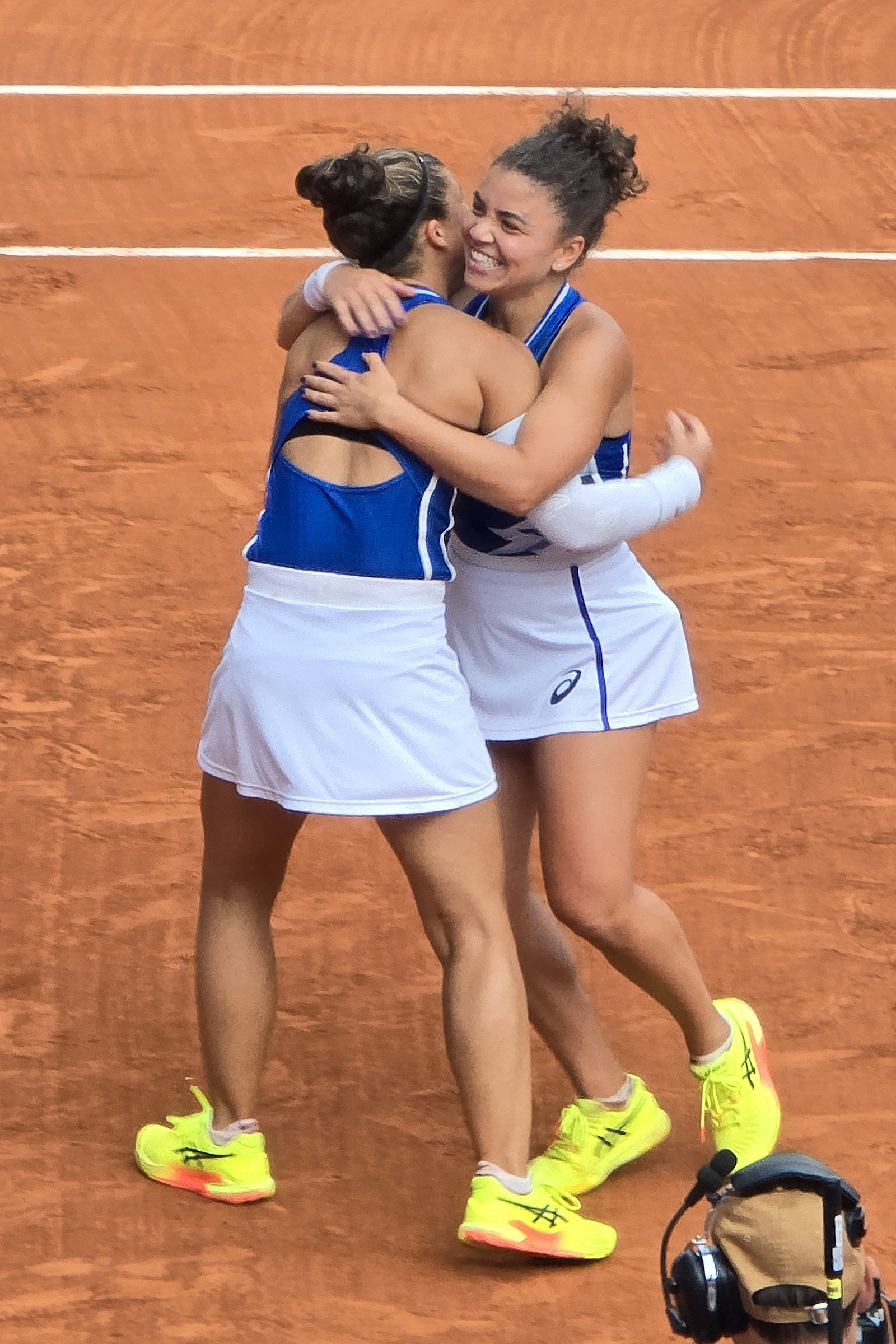
The joy of the victorious Italian women.

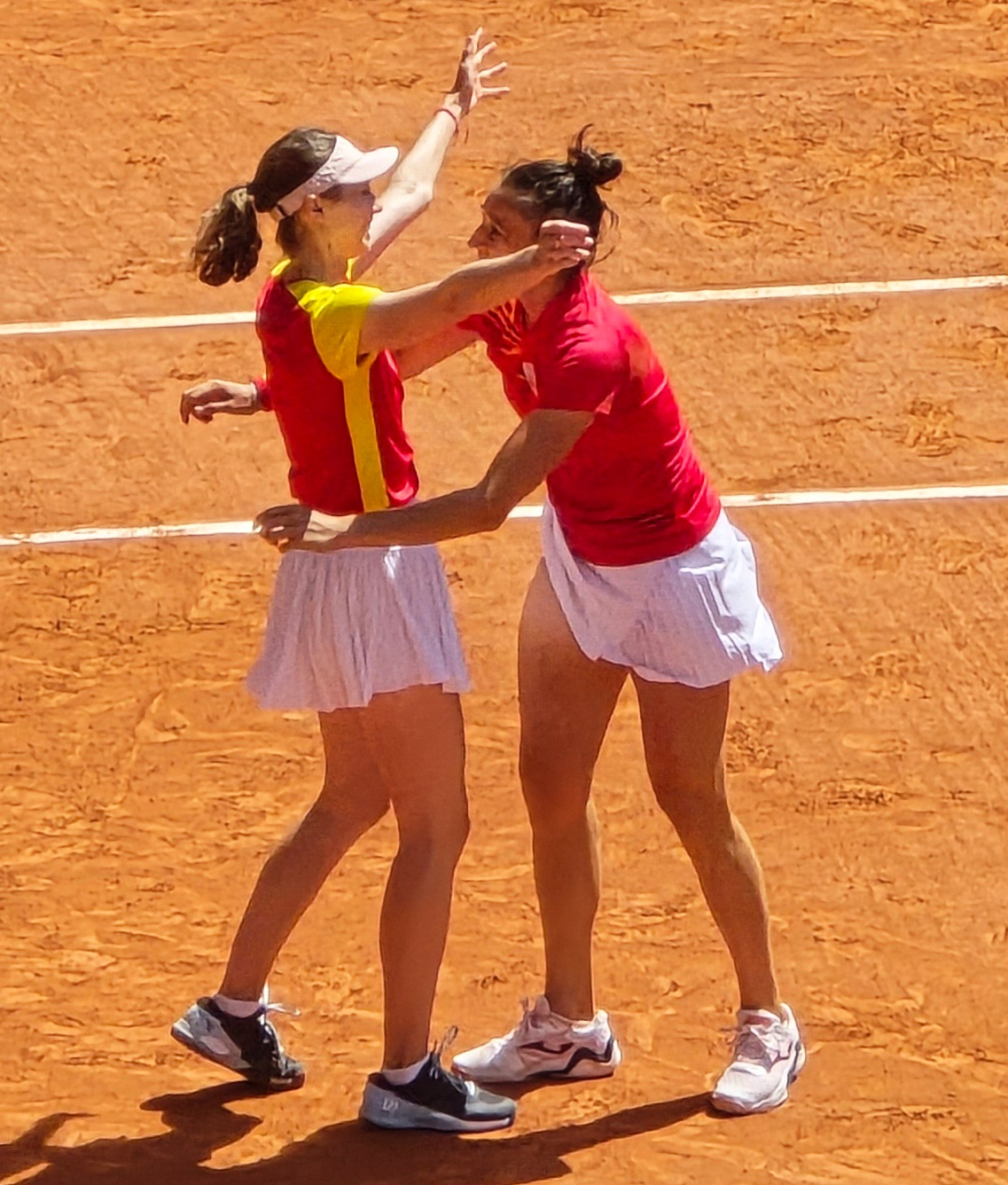
Cristina Bucșa and Sara Sorribes Tormo.

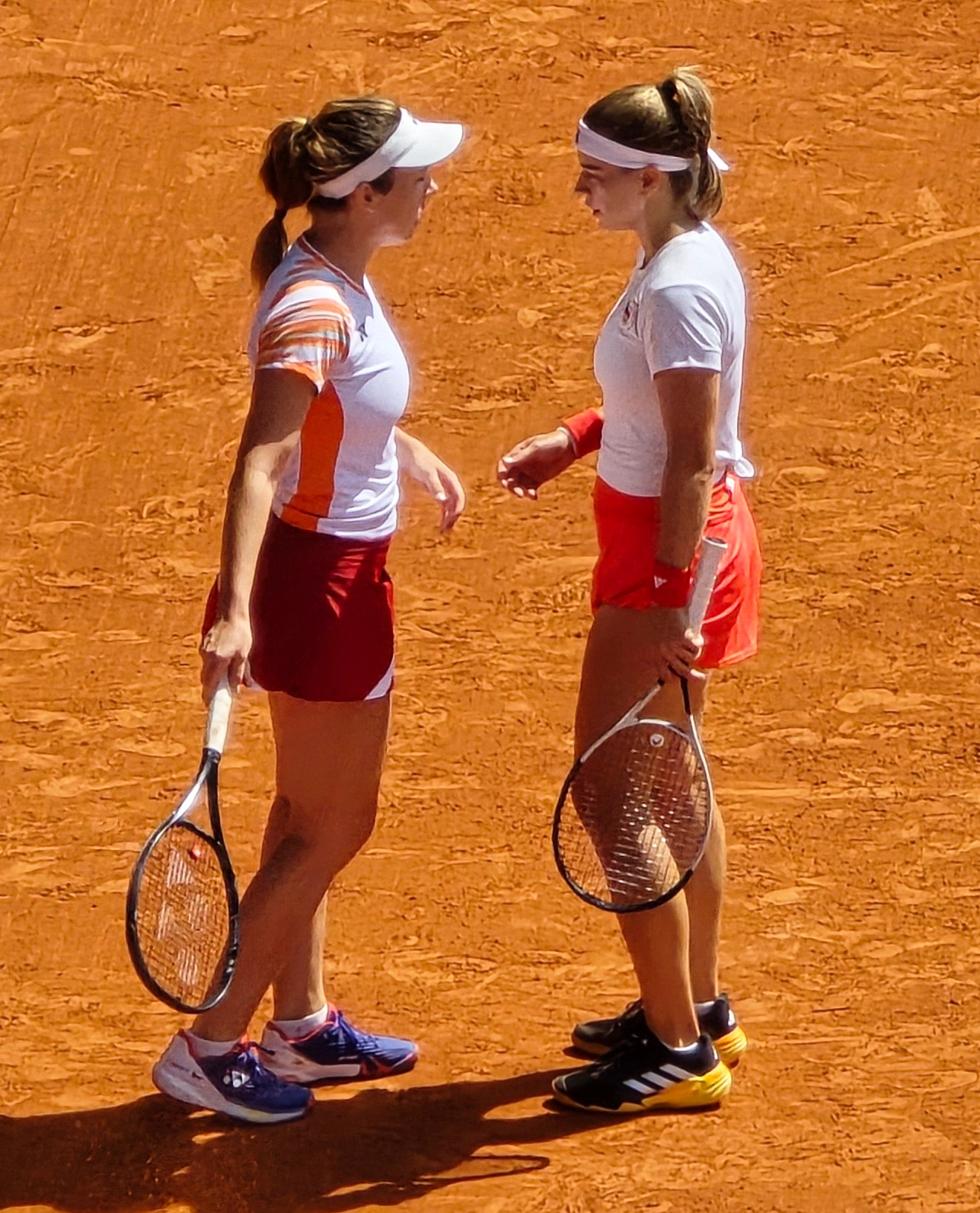
Karolína Muchová and Linda Nosková.
