= Tennis at the 2024 Summer Olympics – Mixed doubles =

Mixed doubles at the Games of the XXXIII Olympiad
- Olympic tennis pictogram
- Venue: Stade Roland Garros
- Dates: 29 July – 2 August
- Competitors: 32 from 16 nations
- Teams: 16

Medalists
1st place, gold medalist(s)		Czech Republic: Kateřina Siniaková; Tomáš Macháč
2nd place, silver medalist(s)		China: Wang Xinyu; Zhang Zhizhen
3rd place, bronze medalist(s)		Canada: Gabriela Dabrowski; Félix Auger-Aliassime

Mixed doubles
- Tennis at the 2024 Summer Olympics

Final
- Champions: (Czech Republic) Kateřina Siniaková (Czech Republic) Tomáš Macháč
- Runners-up: (China) Wang Xinyu (China) Zhang Zhizhen
- Score: 6–2, 5–7, [10–8]

Events
Singles	men	women
Doubles	men	women	mixed
Qualification
← 2020 ·	Summer Olympics	· 2028 →

Czechia's Kateřina Siniaková and Tomáš Macháč defeated China's Wang Xinyu and Zhang Zhizhen in the final, 6–2, 5–7, [10–8] to win the gold medal in mixed doubles tennis at the 2024 Summer Olympics. It was Czechia's first Olympic medal in mixed doubles tennis, and Siniaková's second Olympic gold medal after winning the women's doubles event in 2021. In the bronze medal match, Canada's Gabriela Dabrowski and Félix Auger-Aliassime defeated Demi Schuurs and Wesley Koolhof of the Netherlands, 6–3, 7–6^{(7–2)}. It was Canada's second Olympic tennis medal. In the event, 32 players (16 teams) from 16 nations participated in the draw.

Andrey Rublev and Anastasia Pavlyuchenkova were the reigning gold medalists from 2021, but neither of them chose to compete in this edition of the Summer Games.

== Qualification ==
Each National Olympic Committee (NOC) can enter up to one team. Qualification for the mixed doubles is primarily through the ATP and WTA ranking lists. There are 16 quota places available for mixed doubles.

== Competition format ==
The competition was a single-elimination tournament with a bronze medal match. Matches are best-of-3 sets. A tiebreak was played in the first two sets reaching 6–6, while the third set will be a single tiebreak until one team scores ten points, while being two points clear.

== Schedule ==
The schedule is as follows.

Legend
R64	Round of 64	R32	Round of 32	R16	Round of 16	QF	Quarter-finals	SF	Semi-finals	BM	Bronze medal match	F	Final

Schedule
Mon 29	Tue 30	Wed 31	Thu 1	Fri 2	
R16		¼	½	BM	F

== Seeds ==
Seeds were announced by the International Tennis Federation on 24 July 2024.

1. Laura Siegemund (GER) / Alexander Zverev (GER) (first round)
2. Ellen Perez (AUS) / Matthew Ebden (AUS) (quarterfinals)
3. Coco Gauff (USA) / Taylor Fritz (USA) (quarterfinals)
4. Maria Sakkari (GRE) / Stefanos Tsitsipas (GRE) (first round)

== Draw ==
The draw was held on 25 July 2024.

=== Key ===
- Q = Qualifier
- WC = Wild card
- LL = Lucky loser
- Alt = Alternate
- ITF = ITF entry
- PR = Protected ranking
- SR = Special ranking
- SE = Special exempt
- JE = Junior exempt
- JR = Junior Accelerator Programme entrant
- CO = College Accelerator Programme entrant
- NG = Next Gen Accelerator Program entrant
- w/o = Walkover
- r = Retired
- d = Defaulted

Flag icon key	List of National Flags

=== Draw ===
Round of 16
1	L Siegemund (GER); A Zverev (GER)	4	5
K Siniaková (CZE); T Macháč (CZE)	6	7
C Garcia (FRA); E Roger-Vasselin (FRA)	4	6	[7]
PR	E Shibahara (JPN); K Nishikori (JPN)	6	3	[10]
3	C Gauff (USA); T Fritz (USA)	6	6^{6}	[10]
Alt	N Podoroska (ARG); M González (ARG)	1	7^{8}	[5]
H Watson (GBR); J Salisbury (GBR)	5	6	[3]
G Dabrowski (CAN); F Auger-Aliassime (CAN)	7	4	[10]
S Errani (ITA); A Vavassori (ITA)	6	6
M Andreeva (AIN); D Medvedev (AIN)	3	2
D Schuurs (NED); W Koolhof (NED)	6	7^{7}
4	M Sakkari (GRE); S Tsitsipas (GRE)	4	6^{3}
Alt	L Stefani (BRA); T Seyboth Wild (BRA)	6	3	[8]
Alt	Xin Wang (CHN); Z Zhang (CHN)	3	6	[10]
S Sorribes Tormo (ESP); M Granollers (ESP)	3	4
2	E Perez (AUS); M Ebden (AUS)	6	6

Quarterfinals
K Siniaková (CZE); T Macháč (CZE)	7	6
PR	E Shibahara (JPN); K Nishikori (JPN)	5	2
3	C Gauff (USA); T Fritz (USA)	6^{2}	6	[8]
G Dabrowski (CAN); F Auger-Aliassime (CAN)	7^{7}	3	[10]
S Errani (ITA); A Vavassori (ITA)	7^{7}	3	[9]
D Schuurs (NED); W Koolhof (NED)	6^{4}	6	[11]
Alt	Xin Wang (CHN); Z Zhang (CHN)	6^{8}	7^{10}	[10]
2	E Perez (AUS); M Ebden (AUS)	7^{10}	6^{8}	[5]

Semifinals
K Siniaková (CZE); T Macháč (CZE)	6	6
G Dabrowski (CAN); F Auger-Aliassime (CAN)	3	3
D Schuurs (NED); W Koolhof (NED)	6	4	[4]
Alt	Xin Wang (CHN); Z Zhang (CHN)	2	6	[10]

Gold medal match
K Siniaková (CZE); T Macháč (CZE)	6	5	[10]
Alt	Xin Wang (CHN); Z Zhang (CHN)	2	7	[8]
Bronze medal match
G Dabrowski (CAN); F Auger-Aliassime (CAN)	6	7^{7}
D Schuurs (NED); W Koolhof (NED)	3	6^{2}
