= Individual Neutral Athletes at the 2024 Summer Olympics =

Name used for Russian and Belarusian athletes at the 2024 Summer Olympics

- The final version of the AIN flag assigned by the IOC on 19 March 2024
- IOC code: AIN
- NOC: Athlètes Individuels Neutres

in Paris, France 26 July 2024 – 11 August 2024
- Competitors: 32 (17 men and 15 women) in 10 sports
- Flag bearer: N/A (did not participate in Parade of Nations)
- Medals: Gold 1 Silver 3 Bronze 1 Total 5

Summer Olympics appearances (overview)
- 1992; 1996; 2000; 2004–2008; 2012; 2016; 2020; 2024

Other related appearances
- Russian Empire (1900–1912); Soviet Union (1952–1988); Unified Team (1992); Russia (1994–2016); ROC (2020–2022) Belarus (1996–2020)

Individual Neutral Athletes was the name used to represent approved 32 individual Russian and Belarusian athletes at the 2024 Summer Olympics, after the International Olympic Committee (IOC) banned those nations' previous designations due to the Russian invasion of Ukraine in 2022 that continued into the duration of the games. The IOC country code is AIN, from the French athlètes individuels neutres.

The delegation was banned from using the Olympic flag and Olympic anthem, which was the usual custom for neutral designated athletes in previous games. They instead used a teal flag depicting a circular AIN emblem and a one-off instrumental anthem, both assigned by the IOC. Individual neutral athletes had to be first background checked and then approved by each sport's international federation, and then by a special panel created by the IOC. As individual athletes, they could not compete in team events. The designation was also disallowed from marching in the Parade of Nations during the opening ceremony and from receiving an official ranking in the medal tables.

While the flag uses the singular wording "Individual Neutral Athlete", the IOC uses the plural wording "Individual Neutral Athletes" in prose.

== Background ==
The "draft" emblem of the AIN flag assigned by the IOC on 8 December 2023. The provisional flag was proposed to be white with the emblem.

=== Timeline ===
Following the Russian invasion of Ukraine on 24 February 2022, which began shortly after the 2022 Winter Olympics, the IOC banned Russia and Belarus (Note: Belarus provided military support to Russia and also allowed Russia to use its territory to stage part of the invasion.) and recommended that other international sporting organizers do the same on 28 February 2022. Accordingly, Russian and Belarusian athletes were banned from the 2022 Winter Paralympics.

On 25 January 2023, the IOC published a statement supporting the idea that Russian and Belarusian athletes could be allowed to compete as neutrals, as long as they did not "actively" support the war and as long as Russian and Belarusian flags, anthems, colors, and names were disallowed (thus banning the alternate designations used by Russia in 2018, 2020 and 2022).

On 28 March 2023, the IOC introduced the AIN name and narrowed the requirements down to individual athletes, disallowing any teams of Russian and Belarusian athletes from competing. For events organized by an international federation (IF) other than the IOC, the IOC recommended using no flag at all (or if not possible, the event's flag, the IF's flag, or the letters "AIN") and the event's anthem or the IF's anthem. Federations that did not have French as an official language still used the AIN name. The IOC also donated $5 million to the National Olympic Committee of Ukraine.

On 22 September 2023, the World Anti-Doping Agency (WADA) banned the Russian flag and anthem from international sporting events for a second time (Note: The first was a four-year ban starting 9 December 2019 due to the Russian doping scandal, which was reduced on appeal to a two-year ban starting 17 December 2020, expiring by 18 December 2022.) due to Russian legislation and RUSADA failing to comply with the World Anti-Doping Code, overlapping with the Olympic Truce ban. WADA announced that the ban would not be lifted until "the non-conformities related to national legislation are corrected in full."

On 12 October 2023, the IOC suspended the Russian Olympic Committee until further notice, overlapping with the other two bans, due to its violation of the Olympic Charter due to its inclusion of the regional Olympic Councils of Kherson, Zaporizhzhia, Donetsk, and Luhansk into the Russian Olympic Committee. At the time of its violation of the Olympic Charter, Russian Olympic Committee president Stanislav Pozdnyakov had said he did not see any problems with the incorporation of the former Ukrainian regional IOCs into the Russian IOC. The Russian Olympic Committee responded to its suspension by saying that the IOC had not issued a similar suspension after the Russian Olympic Committee annexed a sporting entity in Crimea in 2014, to which IOC President Thomas Bach remarked, "this argument was a little bit, 'Why did you not sanction us already, earlier?'"

On 8 December 2023, the IOC published a "draft" version of the AIN flag depicting a colorless emblem on a white background, and stated that they would decide on a different neutral anthem at a later date. The IOC also officially stated that the AIN designation would apply to the Paris 2024 games, and that official medal rankings would exclude AIN.

On 19 March 2024, the IOC updated the AIN flag to teal text and a teal background, and published an instrumental anthem "produced solely for this purpose." The IOC also stated that as independent athletes, AIN will not participate as a delegation during the parade of nations at the opening ceremony, but the athletes would still "be given the opportunity to experience the event".

=== Controversies ===
Ukrainian officials have criticized the IOC for not banning Russia despite it violating the Olympic Truce three times, while others have alternately criticized the IOC for applying rules against Russia which aren't applied against other countries.

In particular, the requirement that athletes must not actively support the war has been described as "ineffectual". For example, Russian IOC member Yelena Isinbayeva was cleared as "not linked with the Russian military and not supporting the invasion", despite being pictured in military uniform and receiving military promotions, and despite pro-Russian citizens expressing anger at Isinbayeva after she claimed in defense that she had "never been in the service of the armed forces". On 29 December 2023, an open letter signed by 261 Ukrainian athletes contained evidence that three of the six Russian athletes cleared at that time to participate had in fact actively supported the war, such as by participating in a pro-war rally in March 2022, or starring in a propaganda video explicitly stating and drumming up support for the Russian military.

A compromise suggestion by Poland, where Russians and Belarusians could compete if they were dissidents, was not acted upon by the IOC.

In December 2023, Russian Olympic Committee president Stanislav Pozdnyakov directly threatened any Russian athlete who may choose to participate as a "neutral" at the 2024 Olympics, saying: "As the head of the ROC, I voice a clear position: ... We live in a free state... But... we strongly recommend that you thoroughly understand ... the extent and consequences of the personal responsibility assumed."

In June 2024, Dmitry Chernyshenko, the Deputy Prime Minister of Russia for Tourism, Sport, Culture and Communications, stated that Russian athletes would not violate Russian law by competing in Paris as neutrals and encouraged them to participate. However, despite Chernyshenko's encouragement, the Russian Wrestling Federation decided on 6 July to boycott the Games after most of its leading athletes were deemed ineligible to compete by the IOC. This followed the decision taken by the Russian Judo Federation over the same concerns.

Some individuals, such as Jibril Rajoub, the head of the Palestine Olympic Committee, have asserted that athletes from Israel should also have to compete as neutrals due to the country's ongoing military actions in the Gaza Strip, highlighting what he calls "double standards".

=== Media coverage ===
The main Russian and Belarusian broadcasters (such as Belteleradio, Channel One Russia, Match TV, and VGTRK) did not broadcast or even acknowledge the Olympic and Paralympic Games, except for brief summaries of each day's events in news programming. Broadcasters in Russia adopted a negative view on the Games by capitalising on even the slightest mistake in any event, as part of their criticism of the Western world. This is the first time since 1984 that there was no official coverage of the Games in the two former Soviet countries, when a similar approach was used during the Games in Los Angeles.

Many Russian newspapers and websites, along with Kremlin officials, also adopted a negative view of the Games by cherry picking and accentuating any flaw they could identify: for example, the media accentuated the crime and the "inconvenience" of the security measures, while the Russian Foreign Ministry complained about the weather and the inclusion of the LGBTQ community during the opening ceremony.

The Associated Press noted on 27 July 2024 that Belarusian and Russian viewers depended on satellite channels and streaming services of neighbouring countries (such as Kazakhstan) to get reasonable coverage of the Games, with the Moscow Times noting a rise in social media channels touting pirated streams to Belarusian and Russian viewers. Without an official broadcaster in Russia, the IOC made their Olympics.com streaming service available to viewers in said country.

== Medals summary ==
Tougher restrictions in response to the Russian invasion of Ukraine resulted in the Russian faction of the delegation winning only one silver medal, compared to 20 gold, 28 silver and 23 bronze medals as the Russian Olympic Committee at the 2020 Summer Olympics. Belarus saw a less severe decline in the tally, with one fewer silver and two fewer bronze medals compared to the previous Summer Olympics.

Ivan Litvinovich, who represented Belarus at the 2020 Tokyo Olympics, was the only athlete from the delegation to defend their Olympic title, winning his second gold medal in the men's trampoline, as well as the only gold for the delegation.

Medals by sport
Sport	Gold	Silver	Bronze	Total
Gymnastics	1	1	0	2
Rowing	0	1	0	1
Tennis	0	1	0	1
Weightlifting	0	0	1	1
Total	1	3	1	5

Medals by day
Date	Gold	Silver	Bronze	Total
2 August	1	1	0	2
3 August	0	1	0	1
4 August	0	1	0	1
10 August	0	0	1	1

=== Medalists ===
Medal	Name	Country	Sport	Event	Date
Gold	Ivan Litvinovich	Belarus	Gymnastics	Men's trampoline	2 August
Silver	Viyaleta Bardzilouskaya	Belarus	Gymnastics	Women's trampoline	2 August
Silver	Yauheni Zalaty	Belarus	Rowing	Men's single sculls	3 August
Silver	Mirra Andreeva; Diana Shnaider	Russia	Tennis	Women's doubles	4 August
Bronze	Yauheni Tsikhantsou	Belarus	Weightlifting	Men's – 102 kg	10 August

== Competitors ==
The following is the list of number of competitors in the Games.

AIN team had 32 competitors from the following nations:

1. Belarus – 17 competitors
2. Russia – 15 competitors

The following is a list of the number of competitors representing the Individual Neutral Athletes that participated at the Games:

Sport	Men		Women		Total
Sport	Belarus	Russia	Belarus	Russia	Total
Canoeing	1	2	1	1	5
Cycling	0	1	1	2	4
Gymnastics	1	0	1	1	3
Rowing	1	0	1	0	2
Shooting	0	0	2	0	2
Swimming	1	1	2	0	4
Taekwondo	1	0	0	0	1
Tennis	0	3	0	4	7
Weightlifting	1	0	1	0	2
Wrestling	2	0	0	0	2
Total	8	7	9	8	32

== Canoeing ==
=== Sprint ===
Individual Neutral Athlete canoeists qualified one boat for the Games through the result of highest rank eligible nation's in the following events, through the 2024 European Canoe Sprint Qualifier in Szeged, Hungary.

Athlete	From	Event	Heats		Quarterfinals		Semifinals		Final	
Athlete	From	Event	Time	Rank	Time	Rank	Time	Rank	Time	Rank
Zakhar Petrov	Russia	Men's C-1 1000 m	3:49.86	2 SF	Bye		3:45.99	3 FA	3:45.28	4
Alexey Korovashkov; Zakhar Petrov	Russia	Men's C-2 500 m	1:38.65	1 SF	Bye		1:39.57	1 FA	1:41.27	4
Olesia Romasenko	Russia	Women's C-1 200 m	49.83	5 QF	47.92	4	Did not advance			
Uladzislau Kravets	Belarus	Men's K-1 1000 m	3:32.07	2 SF	Bye		3:29.64	4 FA	3:28.10	4
Yuliya Trushkina	Belarus	Women's C-1 200 m	46.15	2 SF	Bye		45.32	2 FA	44.83	5

Qualification Legend: FA = Qualify to final (medal); FB = Qualify to final B (non-medal)

== Cycling ==
=== Road ===
Four Individual Neutral Athletes qualified as riders for the road race events after securing the quotas through the UCI Nation Ranking.

Athlete	From	Event	Time	Rank
Gleb Syritsa	Russia	Men's road race	Did not finish	
Gleb Syritsa	Russia	Men's time trial	40:33.30	31
Tamara Dronova	Russia	Women's road race	4:07:16	47
Tamara Dronova	Russia	Women's time trial	43:42.16	21
Alena Ivanchenko	Russia	Women's road race	4:10:47	72
Hanna Tserakh	Belarus	Women's road race	4:10:18	61
Hanna Tserakh	Belarus	Women's time trial	44:57.20	29

== Gymnastics ==
=== Trampoline ===
Three Individual Neutral Athletes (one male and two females) entered into the 2024 Summer Olympics trampoline competition through the World Cup Series ranking.

Athlete	From	Event	Qualification		Final	
Athlete	From	Event	Score	Rank	Score	Rank
Ivan Litvinovich	Belarus	Men's	63.420	1 Q	63.090	1st place, gold medalist(s)
Anzhela Bladtceva	Russia	Women's	55.640	4 Q	55.020	5
Viyaleta Bardzilouskaya	Belarus	Women's	56.340	2 Q	56.060	2nd place, silver medalist(s)

== Rowing ==
The Individual Neutral Athlete rowers qualified boats in each of the following classes through the 2023 World Rowing Championships in Belgrade, Serbia and the 2024 European Qualification Regatta in Szeged, Hungary.

Athlete	From	Event	Heats		Repechage		Quarterfinals		Semifinals		Final	
Athlete	From	Event	Time	Rank	Time	Rank	Time	Rank	Time	Rank	Time	Rank
Yauheni Zalaty	Belarus	Men's single sculls	6:51.45	1 QF	Bye		6:49.27	1 SF	6:39.01	2 FA	6:42.96	2nd place, silver medalist(s)
Tatsiana Klimovich	Belarus	Women's single sculls	7:34.31	2 QF	Bye		7:34.30	3 SF	7:26.56	5 FB	7:25.61	8

== Shooting ==
Individual Neutral Athlete shooters achieved quota places for the following events based on their results at the 2024 ISSF World Olympic Qualification Tournament and 2024 European Championship.

Athlete	From	Event	Qualification		Final	
Athlete	From	Event	Points	Rank	Points	Rank
Aliaksandra Piatrova	Belarus	Women's 25 m pistol	566	39	Did not advance	
Darya Chuprys	Belarus	Women's 50 m rifle 3 positions	579	24	Did not advance	

== Swimming ==
Individual Neutral Athlete swimmers achieved the entry standards in the following events for Paris 2024 (a maximum of two swimmers under the Olympic Qualifying Time (OST) and potentially at the Olympic Consideration Time (OCT)):

Athlete	From	Event	Heat		Semifinal		Final	
Athlete	From	Event	Time	Rank	Time	Rank	Time	Rank
Evgenii Somov	Russia	Men's 50 m freestyle	23.43	44	Did not advance			
Evgenii Somov	Russia	Men's 100 m breaststroke	59.83	13 Q	1:00.00	13	Did not advance	
Ilya Shymanovich	Belarus	Men's 100 m breaststroke	59.25	3 Q	59.45	10	Did not advance	
Anastasiya Shkurdai	Belarus	Women's 100 m backstroke	1:00.94	20	Did not advance			
Anastasiya Shkurdai	Belarus	Women's 200 m backstroke	2:09.64	7 Q	2:08.79	8 Q	2:10.23	8
Alina Zmushka	Belarus	Women's 100 m breaststroke	1:06.37	11 Q	1:05.93	5 Q	1:06.54	8
Alina Zmushka	Belarus	Women's 200 m breaststroke	2:28.19	21	Did not advance			

== Taekwondo ==
Initially, Maksim Khramtsov, Vladislav Larin, Tatiana Minina, and Polina Khan qualified for the Games but the IOC did not declare them neutral and they were not invited to the Games.

Men

Athlete	From	Event	Round of 32	Round of 16	Quarterfinals	Semifinals	Repechage	Final / BM	
Athlete	From	Event	Opposition Result	Opposition Result	Opposition Result	Opposition Result	Opposition Result	Opposition Result	Rank
Georgiy Gurtsiev	Belarus	Men's −58 kg	Bye	Ravet (FRA); L 6–7, 3–5	Did not advance				

== Tennis ==
Athlete	From	Event	Round of 64	Round of 32	Round of 16	Quarterfinal	Semifinal	Final / BM	
Athlete	From	Event	Opposition Result	Opposition Result	Opposition Result	Opposition Result	Opposition Result	Opposition Result	Rank
Daniil Medvedev	Russia	Men's singles	Hijikata (AUS); W 6–2, 6–1	Ofner (AUT); W 6–2, 6–2	Auger-Aliassime (CAN); L 3–6, 6–7^{(5–7)}	Did not advance			
Roman Safiullin	Russia	Men's singles	Tabilo (CHI); W 6–4, 6–4	Etcheverry (ARG); W 6–0, 7–6^{(7–1)}	Alcaraz (ESP); L 4–6, 2–6	Did not advance			
Pavel Kotov	Russia	Men's singles	Wawrinka (SUI); L 1–6, 1–6	Did not advance					
Daniil Medvedev; Roman Safiullin	Russia	Men's doubles	—N/a	Krawietz / Pütz (GER); L 4–6, 4–6	Did not advance				
Ekaterina Alexandrova	Russia	Women's singles	Yuan (CHN); L 5–7, 7–6^{(7–0)}, 2–6	Did not advance					
Mirra Andreeva	Russia	Women's singles	Linette (POL); L 3–6, 4–6	Did not advance					
Diana Shnaider	Russia	Women's singles	Cocciaretto (ITA); W 6–2, 7–5	Wang (CHN); L 3–6, 1–6	Did not advance				
Ekaterina Alexandrova; Elena Vesnina	Russia	Women's doubles	—N/a	Muchová / Nosková (CZE); L 6–2, 6–7^{(5–7)}, [6–10]	Did not advance				
Mirra Andreeva; Diana Shnaider	Russia	Women's doubles	—N/a	Gadecki / Tomljanović (AUS); W 6–3, 2–6, [10–6]	Dabrowski / Fernandez (CAN); W 6–4, 6–0	Krejčíková / Siniaková (CZE); W 6–1, 7–5	Bucșa / Sorribes Tormo (ESP); W 6–1, 6–2	Errani / Paolini (ITA); L 6–2, 1–6, [7–10]	2nd place, silver medalist(s)
Mirra Andreeva; Daniil Medvedev	Russia	Mixed doubles	—N/a		Errani / Vavassori (ITA); L 3–6, 2–6	Did not advance			

== Weightlifting ==
Three Individual Neutral Athlete entered into the Olympic competition as weightlifters. Petr Asayonak (men's -89 kg), Yauheni Tsikhantsou (men's 102 kg), Eduard Ziaziulin (men's +102 kg) and Siuzanna Valodzka (women's 71 kg) secured one of the top ten slots in her weight divisions based on the IWF Olympic Qualification Rankings.

Athlete	From	Event	Snatch	Clean & Jerk	Total	Rank
Yauheni Tsikhantsou	Belarus	Men's −102 kg	183	219	402	3rd place, bronze medalist(s)
Siuzanna Valodzka	Belarus	Women's −71 kg	111	135	246	4

== Wrestling ==
On July 6, 2024, the Russian Wrestling Federation announced that all its invited wrestlers have unanimously decided to refuse to participate in the Olympics due to the IOC having blacklisted top Russian medal contenders.

Key:

- VFA (ranking points: 5–0 or 0–5) – Victory by fall.
- VIN (ranking points: 5–0 or 0–5) – Victory by injury.
- VFO (ranking points: 5–0 or 0–5) – Victory by forfeit.
- VPO (ranking points: 3–0 or 0–3) – Decision by points – the loser without technical points.
- VPO1 (ranking points: 3–1 or 1–3) – Decision by points – the loser with technical points.
- VSU (ranking points: 4–0 or 0–4) – Great superiority – the loser without technical points and a margin of victory of at least 8 (Greco-Roman) or 10 (freestyle) points.
- VSU1 (ranking points: 4–1 or 1–4) – Technical superiority – the loser with technical points and a margin of victory of at least 8 (Greco-Roman) or 10 (freestyle) points.

Freestyle

Athlete	From	Event	Round of 32	Round of 16	Quarterfinal	Semifinal	Repechage 1	Repechage 2	Final / BM	
Athlete	From	Event	Opposition Result	Opposition Result	Opposition Result	Opposition Result	Opposition Result	Opposition Result	Opposition Result	Rank
Magomedkhabib Kadimagomedov	Belarus	Men's −74 kg	Zhamalov (UZB); L 0–8^{VPO}	Did not advance			Salkazanov (SVK); W 6–6^{VPO1}	Valiev (ALB); L 2–12^{VSU1}	Did not advance	

Greco-Roman

Athlete	From	Event	Round of 16	Quarterfinal	Semifinal	Repechage	Final / BM	
Athlete	From	Event	Opposition Result	Opposition Result	Opposition Result	Opposition Result	Opposition Result	Rank
Abubakar Khaslakhanau	Belarus	Men's −97 kg	Kobliashvili (GEO); W 9–1^{VSU1}	Gabr (EGY); L 1–4^{VPO1}	Did not advance			

== See also ==
- Refugee Olympic Team at the 2024 Summer Olympics
- Refugee Paralympic Team at the 2024 Summer Paralympics
- Neutral Paralympic Athletes at the 2024 Summer Paralympics
- Individual Neutral Athletes at the 2026 Winter Olympics
