= Tennis at the 2024 Summer Olympics =

Tennis at the Games of the XXXIII Olympiad
- Tennis pictogram for the 2024 Summer Olympics
- Venue: Stade Roland Garros
- Dates: 27 July – 4 August 2024
- No. of events: 5 (2 men, 2 women, 1 mixed)
- Competitors: 175 from 40+1 nations

Tennis at the 2024 Summer Olympics
- Edition: 19th
- Surface: Clay

Champions

Men's singles
- Novak Djokovic (SRB)

Women's singles
- Zheng Qinwen (CHN)

Men's doubles
- Matthew Ebden & John Peers (AUS)

Women's doubles
- Sara Errani & Jasmine Paolini (ITA)

Mixed doubles
- Kateřina Siniaková & Tomáš Macháč (CZE)
- Summer Olympics

The tennis tournaments at the 2024 Summer Olympics in Paris ran from 27 July to 4 August at the Stade Roland Garros. The event featured a total of 175 players across five medal events: singles and doubles for both men and women and mixed doubles.

Similar to previous editions, the Paris 2024 format was set in a single-elimination tournament with the men's and women's singles draws consisting of 64 players. The tennis tournaments featured six rounds in the men's and women's singles, five in the men's and women's doubles (draw size of 32), and four in the mixed doubles (draw size of 16). The players and pairs advancing to the semifinal stage put themselves into medal contention with the two losing semifinalists competing for a bronze medal. All singles matches will be best of three sets with a standard tiebreak (first to seven points) in every set, including the final set. In all doubles competitions, a match tiebreak (first to ten points) will be contested instead of a third set. The Paris 2024 event is the first Olympic clay court event since the Barcelona 1992 event was played at Tennis de la Vall d'Hebron. A total of 10 NOC's won medals along with the Independent Athletes team. It was the second Olympic tournament to be played at a Grand Slam venue in the Open era and the first since the London 2012 event was staged at the Wimbledon Championships venue, the All England Lawn Tennis and Croquet Club.

== Medal summary ==
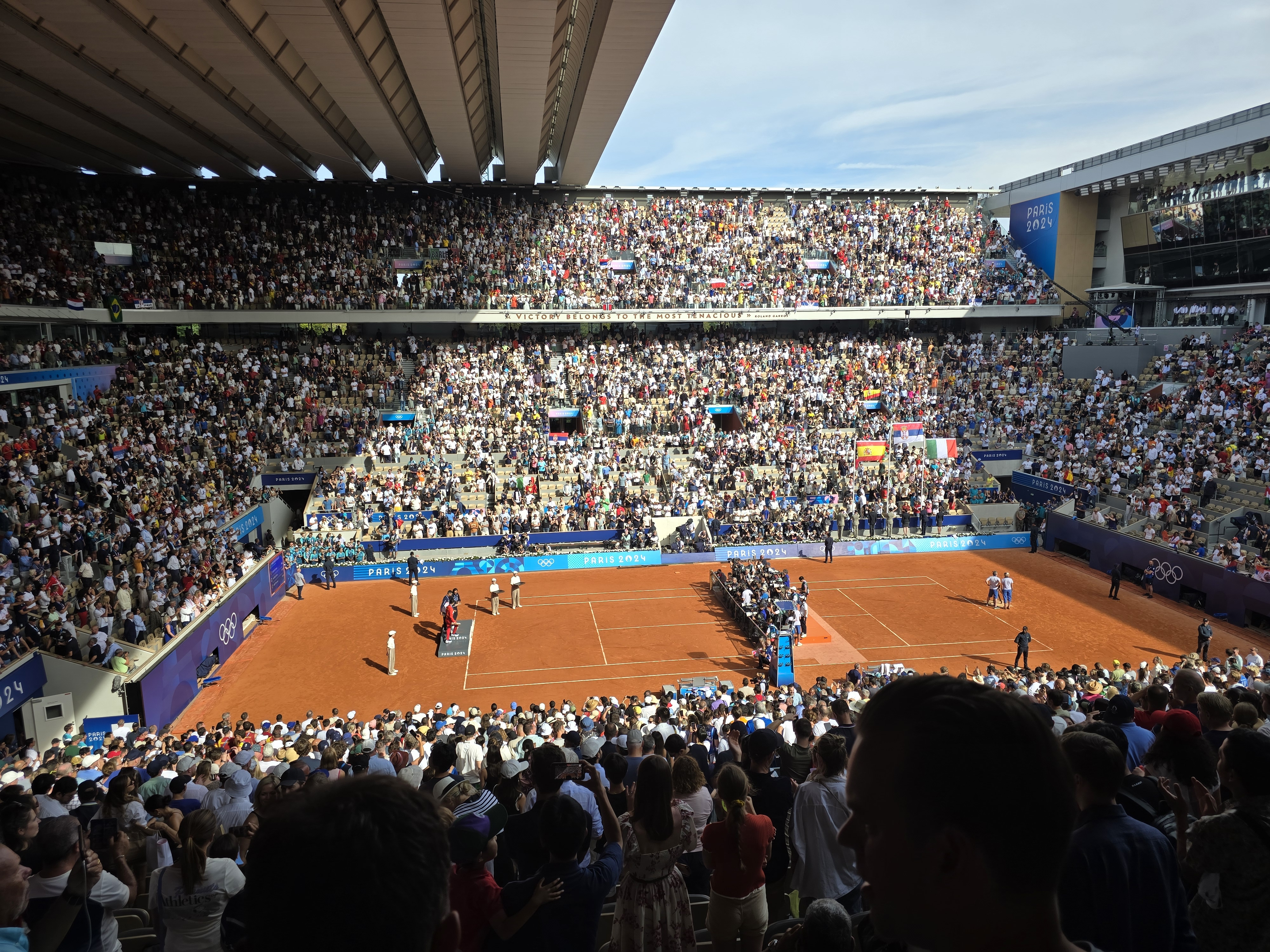
Men's singles tennis tournament podium

A total of fifteen medals were won by ten NOC's and the Independent Athletes team.

=== Events ===
Event	Gold	Silver	Bronze
Men's singles	Novak Djokovic; Serbia	Carlos Alcaraz; Spain	Lorenzo Musetti; Italy
Men's doubles	Australia; Matthew Ebden; John Peers	United States; Austin Krajicek; Rajeev Ram	United States; Taylor Fritz; Tommy Paul
Women's singles	Zheng Qinwen; China	Donna Vekić; Croatia	Iga Świątek; Poland
Women's doubles	Italy; Sara Errani; Jasmine Paolini	Individual Neutral Athletes; Mirra Andreeva; Diana Shnaider	Spain; Cristina Bucșa; Sara Sorribes Tormo
Mixed doubles	Czech Republic; Kateřina Siniaková; Tomáš Macháč	China; Wang Xinyu; Zhang Zhizhen	Canada; Gabriela Dabrowski; Félix Auger-Aliassime

=== Medal table ===
* Host nation (France)

Rank	NOC	Gold	Silver	Bronze	Total
1	China	1	1	0	2
2	Italy	1	0	1	2
3	Australia	1	0	0	1
3	Czech Republic	1	0	0	1
3	Serbia	1	0	0	1
6	Spain	0	1	1	2
6	United States	0	1	1	2
8	Croatia	0	1	0	1
–	Individual Neutral Athletes	0	1	0	1
9	Canada	0	0	1	1
9	Poland	0	0	1	1
Totals (10 entries)		5	5	5	15

== Tournament summary ==
In the women's singles, Zheng Qinwen beat Donna Vekić to become the first Asian tennis player to win Olympic singles gold. It was also China's second tennis gold medal after Li Ting and Sun Tiantian won the women's doubles in Athens in 2004. Zheng's gold medal followed an upset win in the semifinals over world #1 Iga Swiatek of Poland, the four-time and three-time defending French Open champion who had won 25 straight matches at Roland Garros. Swiatek won bronze over Anna Karolína Schmiedlová.

In the men's singles, Novak Djokovic of Serbia overcame French Open champion Spaniard Carlos Alcaraz in straight sets after tiebreaks in both to win gold. It marked the first Olympic gold medal in his fifth Olympic Games for Djokovic, who had won a record 24 Grand Slam men's singles titles including three French Opens (2016, 2021 and 2023), as well as the first Olympic tennis gold medal for Serbia as well as his second medal after having won a bronze medal in Beijing 2008 men's singles. Djokovic also became just the fifth player to win a career singles Golden Slam consisting of all four majors and Olympic gold after Steffi Graf, Andre Agassi, Rafael Nadal and Serena Williams. Graf is the only player to record a Golden Slam in a calendar year after doing so in 1988, while Williams is the only player to have a career Golden Slam in both singles and doubles (with her sister Venus as her partner). Nadal and Williams, together with former French world #1 Amélie Mauresmo, were also chosen among the torchbearers during the last leg of the Olympic torch relay during the opening ceremony despite not being French, and Djokovic beat Nadal in the second round. Lorenzo Musetti won bronze over Félix Auger-Aliassime in three sets.

Everything I felt in that moment when I won surpassed everything I thought or hoped that it would...Being on that court with the Serbian flag raising, singing the Serbian anthem, with the gold around my neck, I think nothing can beat that in terms of professional sport. It definitely stands out as the biggest sporting achievement I have had.

— Novak Djokovic after winning the men's singles gold medal

In the men's doubles, Matthew Ebden and John Peers became the first Australian pair to win the event since "The Woodies" (Todd Woodbridge and Mark Woodforde) in Atlanta in 1996, while the United States pairs took both silver and bronze. Sara Errani and Jasmine Paolini won the women's doubles, while Kateřina Siniaková and Tomáš Macháč won the mixed doubles.

The event was also Andy Murray's last professional outing after winning gold in the London 2012 event at Wimbledon and in Rio de Janeiro four years later, where he was Great Britain's opening ceremony flagbearer, in addition to three Grand Slam singles titles and a Davis Cup with Great Britain. It was also the last event for former world #1 Angelique Kerber, who had won three Grand Slam singles titles and been the silver medalist in Rio.

== Qualification ==
To be eligible for Paris 2024, a tennis player must satisfy the key criteria to play on Davis Cup or Billie Jean King Cup teams. The qualification pathway for the singles tournaments is primarily based on the ATP and WTA rankings of 10 June 2024, with 56 players entering each of the men's and women's singles (limited to four per National Olympic Committee (NOC)). Six of the remaining eight slots are attributed to the NOCs with no other qualified tennis players across five continental zones (two for the Americas and one each for the rest). The final two spots are reserved, one for the host nation France and the other for the previous Olympic gold medalist or Grand Slam champion. In the men's and women's doubles tournaments, thirty-two places will offer for the highest-ranked teams with ten of them reserved for players in the top ten of the doubles rankings, who could select his or her partner from their NOC ranked in the top 300 of either singles or doubles. The remaining spots are attributed through the combined rankings with a preference given to the singles players once the total quota is filled. One team per gender is reserved for the host nation France if none has already become eligible otherwise. With no quota places available for the mixed doubles, all teams will consist of players already entered in either the singles or doubles, including the top 15 combined ranking teams and the host nation France.

== Schedule ==
Legend
R64	Round of 64	R32	Round of 32	R16	Round of 16	QF	Quarter-finals	SF	Semi-finals	BM	Bronze medal match	F	Final

Schedule
Date	Sat 27	Sun 28	Mon 29	Tue 30	Wed 31	Thu 1	Fri 2		Sat 3	Sun 4	
Start time	12:00	12:00	12:00	12:00	12:00	12:00	12:00		12:00	12:00	
Men's singles	R64		R32		R16	QF	SF		BM	F	
Men's doubles	R32		R16	QF	SF		BM		F		
Women's singles	R64		R32	R16	QF	SF	BM		F		
Women's doubles	R32		R16		QF	SF				BM	F
Mixed doubles			R16		QF	SF	BM	F			

== Participating nations ==
There were 175 tennis athletes from 40 participating NOC's and the Individual Neutral Athlete team.

- Argentina (8)
- Australia (9)
- Austria (1)
- Belgium (3)
- Brazil (5)
- Bulgaria (1)
- Canada (5)
- Chile (3)
- China (7)
- Colombia (1)
- Croatia (4)
- Czech Republic (7)
- Denmark (2)
- Egypt (1)
- France (9)
- Germany (10)
- Great Britain (7)
- Greece (4)
- Hungary (2)
- India (3)
- Individual Neutral Athletes (7)
- Italy (8)
- Japan (6)
- Kazakhstan (3)
- Latvia (1)
- Lebanon (2)
- Montenegro (1)
- Netherlands (6)
- New Zealand (2)
- Norway (1)
- Poland (4)
- Portugal (2)
- Romania (4)
- Serbia (2)
- Slovakia (1)
- Spain (8)
- Chinese Taipei (4)
- Tunisia (1)
- Ukraine (5)
- United States (11)

== See also ==
- Tennis at the 2023 African Games
- Tennis at the 2022 Asian Games
- Tennis at the 2023 Pan American Games
- Wheelchair tennis at the 2024 Summer Paralympics
