= Tennis at the 2024 Summer Olympics – Women's singles =

Women's singles
- Tennis at the 2024 Summer Olympics

Final
- Champion: (China) Zheng Qinwen
- Runner-up: (Croatia) Donna Vekić
- Score: 6–2, 6–3

Details
- Draw: 64
- Seeds: 16

Events
Singles	men	women
Doubles	men	women	mixed
Qualification
← 2020 ·	Summer Olympics	· 2028 →

Women's singles at the Games of the XXXIII Olympiad
- Olympic tennis pictogram
- Venue: Stade Roland Garros
- Dates: 27 July – 3 August
- Competitors: 64 from 30 nations

Medalists
1st place, gold medalist(s)		Zheng Qinwen	China
2nd place, silver medalist(s)		Donna Vekić	Croatia
3rd place, bronze medalist(s)		Iga Świątek	Poland

China's Zheng Qinwen defeated Croatia's Donna Vekić in the final, 6–2, 6–3 to win the gold medal in the women's singles tennis event at the 2024 Summer Olympics. It was China's first gold medal in the women's singles, its first gold medal in Olympic tennis since the women's doubles in 2004, the first singles gold medal for an Asian country in Olympic tennis, and also the first women's singles medal for Croatia. Zheng saved a match point en route to the gold medal, in the third round against the United States' Emma Navarro. In the bronze medal match, Poland's Iga Świątek defeated Slovakia's Anna Karolína Schmiedlová, 6–2, 6–1. It was Poland's first Olympic medal in tennis. Ranked No. 67, Schmiedlová was the lowest-ranked semifinalist since tennis returned to the Olympics in 1988, and the first Slovak woman to reach that stage.

Belinda Bencic was the reigning gold medalist from 2021, but was on maternity leave. The reigning silver medalist, Markéta Vondroušová, also withdrew due to injury. Bronze medalist Elina Svitolina was the only defending medalist, but lost to Barbora Krejčíková in the third round.

The women's singles tennis event at the 2024 Summer Olympics took place from 27 July to 3 August 2024 at the Stade Roland Garros, in Paris, France. There were 64 players from 28 nations.

This tournament marked the final professional appearance of former world No. 1, 2016 silver medalist, and three-time major champion Angelique Kerber. She lost in the quarterfinals to Zheng.

== Qualification ==
Each National Olympic Committee (NOC) can enter up to four players. Nations are limited to four players in the event since the 2000 Games. Qualification for the women's singles is primarily through the WTA ranking list. There are 64 quota places available for women's singles.

== Competition format ==
The competition is a single-elimination tournament with a bronze medal match. Matches are best-of-3 sets. A tiebreak is played in all sets reaching 6–6, including the last set of a match.

== Schedule ==
The schedule is as follows.

Legend
R64	Round of 64	R32	Round of 32	R16	Round of 16	QF	Quarter-finals	SF	Semi-finals	BM	Bronze medal match	F	Final

Schedule
Sat 27	Sun 28	Mon 29	Tue 30	Wed 31	Thu 1	Fri 2	Sat 3
R64		R32	R16	¼	½	BM	F

== Seeds ==
The seeds were released on 22 July 2024.

1. Iga Świątek (POL) (semifinals, bronze medalist)
2. Coco Gauff (USA) (third round)
3. Elena Rybakina (KAZ) (withdrew due to illness)
4. Jasmine Paolini (ITA) (third round)
5. Jessica Pegula (USA) (second round)
6. Zheng Qinwen (CHN) (champion, gold medalist)
7. Maria Sakkari (GRE) (third round)
8. Danielle Collins (USA) (quarterfinals, retired)
9. Barbora Krejčíková (CZE) (quarterfinals)
10. Jeļena Ostapenko (LAT) (first round)
11. Emma Navarro (USA) (third round)
12. Marta Kostyuk (UKR) (quarterfinals)
13. Donna Vekić (CRO) (final, silver medalist)
14. Beatriz Haddad Maia (BRA) (second round)
15. Diana Shnaider (AIN) (second round)
16. Leylah Fernandez (CAN) (third round)
17. Caroline Garcia (FRA) (first round)

Click on the seed number of a player to go to their draw section.

== Draw ==
The draw was held on 25 July 2024.

=== Key ===
- Q = Qualifier
- WC = Wild card
- LL = Lucky loser
- Alt = Alternate
- ITF = ITF entry
- PR = Protected ranking
- SR = Special ranking
- SE = Special exempt
- JE = Junior exempt
- JR = Junior Accelerator Programme entrant
- CO = College Accelerator Programme entrant
- NG = Next Gen Accelerator Program entrant
- w/o = Walkover
- r = Retired
- d = Defaulted
- UP = Universality place

Flag icon key	List of National Flags

=== Finals ===
Quarterfinals
1	Iga Świątek (POL)	6	2	4
8	Danielle Collins (USA)	1	6	1^{r}
PR	Angelique Kerber (GER)	7^{7}	4	6^{6}
6/ITF	Zheng Qinwen (CHN)	6^{4}	6	7^{8}
9	Barbora Krejčíková (CZE)	4	2
Anna Karolína Schmiedlová (SVK)	6	6
12	Marta Kostyuk (UKR)	4	6	6^{8}
13	Donna Vekić (CRO)	6	2	7^{10}

Semifinals
1	Iga Świątek (POL)	2	5
6/ITF	Zheng Qinwen (CHN)	6	7
Anna Karolína Schmiedlová (SVK)	4	0
13	Donna Vekić (CRO)	6	6

Gold medal match
6/ITF	Zheng Qinwen (CHN)	6	6
13	Donna Vekić (CRO)	2	3
Bronze medal match
1	Iga Świątek (POL)	6	6
Anna Karolína Schmiedlová (SVK)	2	1

=== Top half ===
==== Section 1 ====
First round
1	I Świątek (POL)	6	7
PR	I-C Begu (ROU)	2	5
N Podoroska (ARG)	6^{6}	5
D Parry (FRA)	7^{8}	7
L Nosková (CZE)	3	3
Xiy Wang (CHN)	6	6
E Cocciaretto (ITA)	2	5
15	D Shnaider (AIN)	6	7
10	J Ostapenko (LAT)	4	3
C Osorio (COL)	6	6
ITF	L Pigossi (BRA)	6	5	0
D Yastremska (UKR)	3	7	6
ITF	M Sherif (EGY)	6	5	1
ITF	C Wozniacki (DEN)	2	7	6
L Siegemund (GER)	3	0^{r}
8	D Collins (USA)	6	2

Second round
1	I Świątek (POL)	6	6
D Parry (FRA)	1	1
Xiy Wang (CHN)	6	6
15	D Shnaider (AIN)	3	1
C Osorio (COL)	7^{7}	6
D Yastremska (UKR)	6^{4}	4
ITF	C Wozniacki (DEN)	3	6	3
8	D Collins (USA)	6	3	6

Third round
1	I Świątek (POL)	6	6
Xiy Wang (CHN)	3	4
C Osorio (COL)	0	6	3
8	D Collins (USA)	6	4	6

Quarterfinals
1	I Świątek (POL)	6	2	4
8	D Collins (USA)	1	6	1^{r}

==== Section 2 ====
First round
17	C Garcia (FRA)	7	3	4
J Cristian (ROU)	5	6	6
ITF	N Osaka (JPN)	5	3
PR	A Kerber (GER)	7	6
P Martić (CRO)	4	3
C Bucșa (ESP)	6	6
K Muchová (CZE)	1	6	2
16	L Fernandez (CAN)	6	4	6
11	E Navarro (USA)	6	6
PR	J Grabher (AUT)	2	0
M Fręch (POL)	4	6^{4}
V Tomova (BUL)	6	7^{7}
Alt	O Gadecki (AUS)	4	1
A Rus (NED)	6	6
Alt	S Errani (ITA)	0	0
6/ITF	Q Zheng (CHN)	6	6

Second round
J Cristian (ROU)	4	6	4
PR	A Kerber (GER)	6	3	6
C Bucșa (ESP)	6^{4}	3
16	L Fernandez (CAN)	7^{7}	6
11	E Navarro (USA)	6^{5}	6	6
V Tomova (BUL)	7^{7}	4	1
A Rus (NED)	2	4
6/ITF	Q Zheng (CHN)	6	6

Third round
PR	A Kerber (GER)	6	6
16	L Fernandez (CAN)	4	3
11	E Navarro (USA)	7^{9}	6^{4}	1
6/ITF	Q Zheng (CHN)	6^{7}	7^{7}	6

Quarterfinals
PR	A Kerber (GER)	7^{7}	4	6^{6}
6/ITF	Q Zheng (CHN)	6^{4}	6	7^{8}

=== Bottom half ===
==== Section 3 ====
First round
5	J Pegula (USA)	6	6
V Golubic (SUI)	3	4
M Uchijima (JPN)	2	1
E Svitolina (UKR)	6	6
Xin Wang (CHN)	6	6
T Korpatsch (GER)	2	1
S Sorribes Tormo (ESP)	6	0	6^{3}
9	B Krejčíková (CZE)	4	6	7^{7}
14	B Haddad Maia (BRA)	6	4	6
V Gracheva (FRA)	4	6	0
AK Schmiedlová (SVK)	6	6
K Boulter (GBR)	4	2
M Linette (POL)	6	6
M Andreeva (AIN)	3	4
A Bogdan (ROU)	5	3
4	J Paolini (ITA)	7	6

Second round
5	J Pegula (USA)	6	1	3
E Svitolina (UKR)	4	6	6
Xin Wang (CHN)	3	2
9	B Krejčíková (CZE)	6	6
14	B Haddad Maia (BRA)	4	4
AK Schmiedlová (SVK)	6	6
M Linette (POL)	4	1
4	J Paolini (ITA)	6	6

Third round
E Svitolina (UKR)	6^{5}	6	4
9	B Krejčíková (CZE)	7^{7}	2	6
AK Schmiedlová (SVK)	7	3	7
4	J Paolini (ITA)	5	6	5

Quarterfinals
9	B Krejčíková (CZE)	4	2
AK Schmiedlová (SVK)	6	6

==== Section 4 ====
First round
7	M Sakkari (GRE)	6	6
UP	D Kovinić (MNE)	0	1
E Alexandrova (AIN)	5	7^{7}	2
Y Yuan (CHN)	7	6^{0}	6
C Burel (FRA)	7^{7}	6
K Siniaková (CZE)	6^{3}	4
Alt	L Sun (NZL)	4	3
12	M Kostyuk (UKR)	6	6
13	D Vekić (CRO)	6	7
L Bronzetti (ITA)	2	5
PR	B Andreescu (CAN)	6	6
C Tauson (DEN)	2	3
ITF	ML Carlé (ARG)	6	6
T Maria (GER)	0	0
PR	A Tomljanović (AUS)	3	0
2	C Gauff (USA)	6	6

Second round
7	M Sakkari (GRE)	6	6
Y Yuan (CHN)	2	1
C Burel (FRA)	6^{3}	2
12	M Kostyuk (UKR)	7^{7}	6
13	D Vekić (CRO)	6	6
PR	B Andreescu (CAN)	3	4
ITF	ML Carlé (ARG)	1	1
2	C Gauff (USA)	6	6

Third round
7	M Sakkari (GRE)	6	6^{5}	4
12	M Kostyuk (UKR)	4	7^{7}	6
13	D Vekić (CRO)	7^{9}	6
2	C Gauff (USA)	6^{7}	2

Quarterfinals
12	M Kostyuk (UKR)	4	6	6^{8}
13	D Vekić (CRO)	6	2	7^{10}

== See also ==
- Summer Olympic Games
