= Tennis at the 2024 Summer Olympics – Men's singles =

Men's singles
- Tennis at the 2024 Summer Olympics

Final
- Champion: (Serbia) Novak Djokovic
- Runner-up: (Spain) Carlos Alcaraz
- Score: 7–6^{(7–3)}, 7–6^{(7–2)}

Events
Singles	men	women
Doubles	men	women	mixed
Qualification
- Summer Olympics

Men's singles at the Games of the XXXIII Olympiad
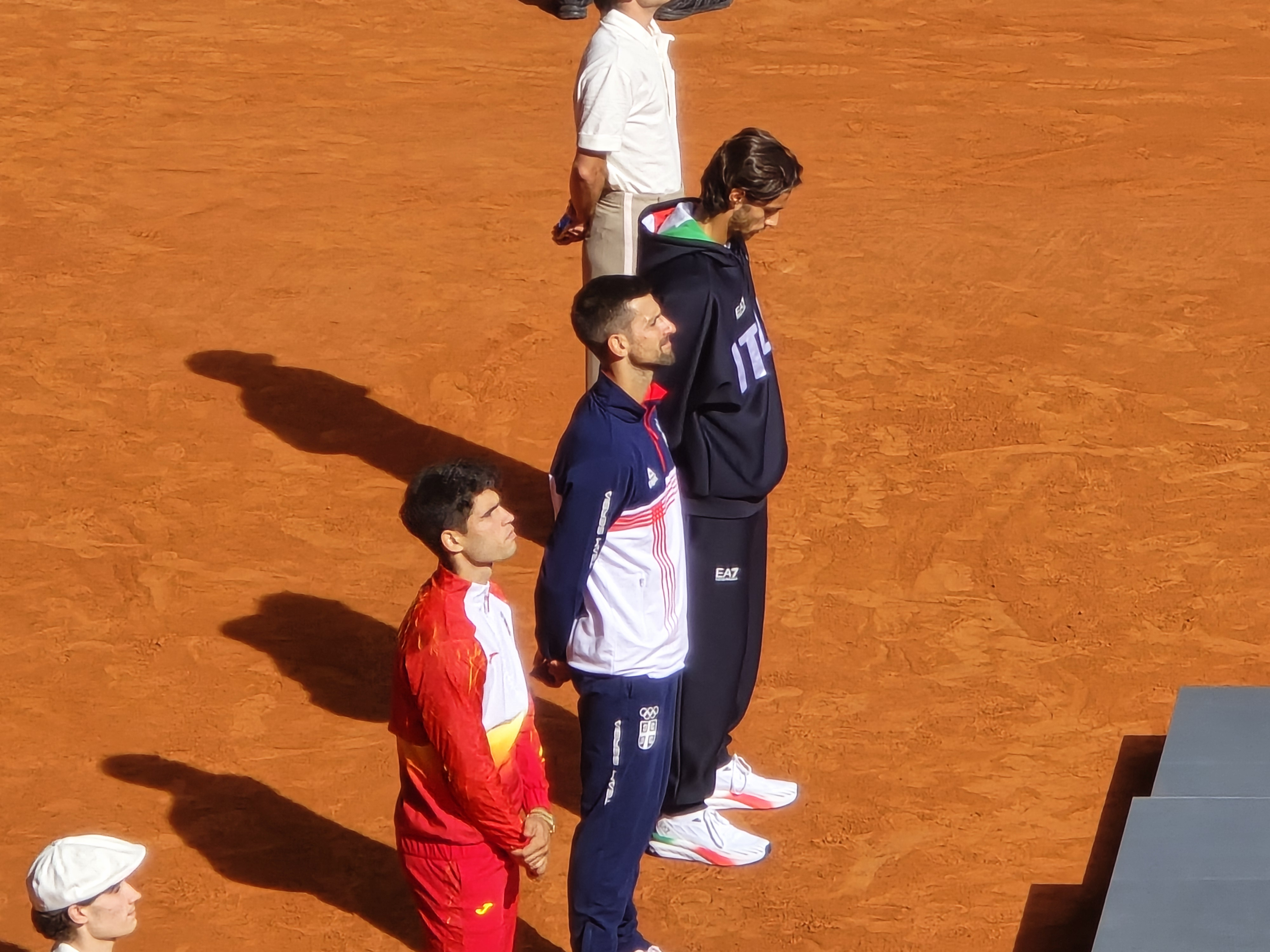
- Carlos Alcaraz, Novak Djokovic and Lorenzo Musetti awaiting the podium ceremony.
- Venue: Stade Roland Garros
- Dates: 27 July – 4 August
- Competitors: 64 from 28 nations

Medalists
1st place, gold medalist(s)		Novak Djokovic	Serbia
2nd place, silver medalist(s)		Carlos Alcaraz	Spain
3rd place, bronze medalist(s)		Lorenzo Musetti	Italy

Serbia's Novak Djokovic defeated Spain's Carlos Alcaraz in the final, 7–6^{(7–3)}, 7–6^{(7–2)} to win the gold medal in the men's singles tennis event at the 2024 Summer Olympics. It was Serbia's first gold medal in Olympic tennis. Djokovic became the third man (after Andre Agassi and Rafael Nadal) to complete the career Golden Slam, and the only man to win all the Big Titles in singles. Djokovic was the oldest men's singles finalist and champion since tennis returned to the Olympic Games in 1988, while Alcaraz was the youngest finalist. Djokovic became the first man to win the Olympics without losing a set during the tournament, in his third consecutive Olympics as the top seed. En route to victory, Djokovic defeated Nadal in their record-extending 60th and final professional meeting, to end their head-to-head at 31–29 in his favor.

In the bronze medal match, Italy's Lorenzo Musetti defeated Canada's Félix Auger-Aliassime, 6–4, 1–6, 6–3. It was Italy's second Olympic tennis medal, 100 years after Uberto De Morpurgo won a bronze medal in the men's singles in 1924.

The men's singles tennis event at the 2024 Summer Olympics took place from 27 July to 4 August 2024 at the Stade Roland Garros, in Paris, France. There were 64 players from 27 nations.

Alexander Zverev was the defending gold medalist, but lost in the quarterfinals to Musetti.

For the second time (after 2012), the same two players contested both the Wimbledon and Olympics finals in the same year, with the Wimbledon runner-up going on to win Olympic gold both times.

== Background ==
This was the 17th (medal) appearance of the men's singles tennis event. The event has been held at every Summer Olympics where tennis has been on the program: from 1896 to 1924 and then from 1988 to the current program. Demonstration events were held in 1968 and 1984.

The No. 1 seed was Novak Djokovic of Serbia, who was making his fifth Olympic appearance and attempting to complete the Career Golden Slam after reaching the semifinals in 2008 (bronze medal), 2012 (fourth place), and 2020 (fourth place). The No. 2 seed was Carlos Alcaraz of Spain, making his Olympic debut. The defending champion and No. 3 seed was Alexander Zverev of Germany. Defending silver medalist Karen Khachanov and defending bronze medalist Pablo Carreño Busta did not compete, though the latter did participate in the doubles event. World No. 1 Jannik Sinner withdrew before the tournament due to tonsillitis. Other top players who were not present included Andrey Rublev, Hubert Hurkacz, Alex de Minaur (competed only in doubles), and Grigor Dimitrov.

== Qualification ==
Each National Olympic Committee (NOC) can enter up to four players. Nations are limited to four players in the event since the 2000 Games. Qualification for the men's singles is primarily through the ATP ranking list. There are 64 quota places available for men's singles.

== Competition format ==
The competition was a single-elimination tournament with a bronze medal match. Matches were best-of-3 sets. A 7 point tiebreak was played in all sets reaching 6–6, including the last set of a match.

== Schedule ==
The schedule is as follows.

Legend
R64	Round of 64	R32	Round of 32	R16	Round of 16	QF	Quarter-finals	SF	Semi-finals	BM	Bronze medal match	F	Final

Schedule
Sat 27	Sun 28	Mon 29	Tue 30	Wed 31	Thu 1	Fri 2	Sat 3	Sun 4
R64		R32		R16	¼	½	BM	F

== Seeds ==
The seeds were released on 22 July 2024.

1. Novak Djokovic (SRB) (champion, gold medalist)
2. Carlos Alcaraz (ESP) (final, silver medalist)
3. Alexander Zverev (GER) (quarterfinals)
4. Daniil Medvedev (AIN) (third round)
5. Alex de Minaur (AUS) (withdrew due to hip injury)
6. Casper Ruud (NOR) (quarterfinals)
7. Taylor Fritz (USA) (third round)
8. Stefanos Tsitsipas (GRE) (quarterfinals)
9. Tommy Paul (USA) (quarterfinals)
10. Ugo Humbert (FRA) (second round)
11. Lorenzo Musetti (ITA) (semifinals, bronze medalist)
12. Sebastián Báez (ARG) (third round)
13. Félix Auger-Aliassime (CAN) (semifinals, fourth place)
14. Arthur Fils (FRA) (first round)
15. Alejandro Tabilo (CHI) (first round)
16. Nicolás Jarry (CHI) (first round)

Click on the seed number of a player to go to their draw section.

== Draw ==
The draw was held on 25 July 2024.

Key

- Q = Qualifier
- WC = Wild card
- LL = Lucky loser
- Alt = Alternate
- ITF = ITF entry
- PR = Protected ranking
- SR = Special ranking
- SE = Special exempt
- JE = Junior exempt
- JR = Junior Accelerator Programme entrant
- CO = College Accelerator Programme entrant
- NG = Next Gen Accelerator Program entrant
- w/o = Walkover
- r = Retired
- d = Defaulted
- UP = Universality place

Flag icon key	List of National Flags

=== Finals ===
Quarterfinals
1	Novak Djokovic (SRB)	6	7^{7}
8	Stefanos Tsitsipas (GRE)	3	6^{3}
3	Alexander Zverev (GER)	5	5
11	Lorenzo Musetti (ITA)	7	7
6	Casper Ruud (NOR)	4	7^{10}	3
13	Félix Auger-Aliassime (CAN)	6	6^{8}	6
9	Tommy Paul (USA)	3	6^{7}
2	Carlos Alcaraz (ESP)	6	7^{9}

Semifinals
1	Novak Djokovic (SRB)	6	6
11	Lorenzo Musetti (ITA)	4	2
13	Félix Auger-Aliassime (CAN)	1	1
2	Carlos Alcaraz (ESP)	6	6

Final (gold medal match)
1	Novak Djokovic (SRB)	7^{7}	7^{7}
2	Carlos Alcaraz (ESP)	6^{3}	6^{2}
Bronze medal match
11	Lorenzo Musetti (ITA)	6	1	6
13	Félix Auger-Aliassime (CAN)	4	6	3

=== Top half ===
==== Section 1 ====
First round
1	N Djokovic (SRB)	6	6
Alt	M Ebden (AUS)	0	1
M Fucsovics (HUN)	1	6	4
PR	R Nadal (ESP)	6	4	6
PR	M Raonic (CAN)	7^{7}	6^{5}	6^{1}
D Koepfer (GER)	6^{2}	7^{7}	7^{7}
M Arnaldi (ITA)	6	7^{9}
14	A Fils (FRA)	4	6^{7}
12	S Báez (ARG)	6	6
ITF	T Monteiro (BRA)	4	3
C Eubanks (USA)	4	2
UP	B Hassan (LBN)	6	6
ITF	M Echargui (TUN)	2	6	2
D Evans (GBR)	6	4	6
Z Bergs (BEL)	6^{6}	6	1
8	S Tsitsipas (GRE)	7^{8}	1	6

Second round
1	N Djokovic (SRB)	6	6
PR	R Nadal (ESP)	1	4
D Koepfer (GER)	3	6	6
M Arnaldi (ITA)	6	2	1
12	S Báez (ARG)	6	3	7^{7}
UP	B Hassan (LBN)	2	6	6^{3}
D Evans (GBR)	1	2
8	S Tsitsipas (GRE)	6	6

Third round
1	N Djokovic (SRB)	7	6
D Koepfer (GER)	5	3
12	S Báez (ARG)	5	1
8	S Tsitsipas (GRE)	7	6

Quarterfinals
1	N Djokovic (SRB)	6	7^{7}
8	S Tsitsipas (GRE)	3	6^{3}

==== Section 2 ====
First round
3	A Zverev (GER)	6	6
J Munar (ESP)	2	2
T Macháč (CZE)	6	4	6
ITF	Z Zhang (CHN)	2	6	2
ITF	S Wawrinka (SUI)	6	6
P Kotov (AIN)	1	1
A Popyrin (AUS)	6	7^{7}
16	N Jarry (CHI)	3	6^{5}
11	L Musetti (ITA)	6	6
G Monfils (FRA)	1	4
M Navone (ARG)	6	6
N Borges (POR)	2	2
J Draper (GBR)	6	6
PR	K Nishikori (JPN)	1	4
A Bublik (KAZ)	4	4
7	T Fritz (USA)	6	6

Second round
3	A Zverev (GER)	6	7
T Macháč (CZE)	3	5
ITF	S Wawrinka (SUI)	4	5
A Popyrin (AUS)	6	7
11	L Musetti (ITA)	7^{7}	6
M Navone (ARG)	6^{2}	3
J Draper (GBR)	7^{7}	3	2
7	T Fritz (USA)	6^{3}	6	6

Third round
3	A Zverev (GER)	7	6
A Popyrin (AUS)	5	3
11	L Musetti (ITA)	6	7
7	T Fritz (USA)	4	5

Quarterfinals
3	A Zverev (GER)	5	5
11	L Musetti (ITA)	7	7

=== Bottom half ===
==== Section 3 ====
First round
6	C Ruud (NOR)	7	6
T Daniel (JPN)	5	1
P Martínez (ESP)	4	6	4
Alt	A Vavassori (ITA)	6	4	6
F Cerúndolo (ARG)	6	6
ITF	T Barrios Vera (CHI)	2	1
F Marozsán (HUN)	3	2
10	U Humbert (FRA)	6	6
13	F Auger-Aliassime (CAN)	6	6
M Giron (USA)	1	4
D Lajović (SRB)	3	7^{8}	3
M Marterer (GER)	6	6^{6}	6
Alt	R Haase (NED)	5	2
S Ofner (AUT)	7	6
R Hijikata (AUS)	2	1
4	D Medvedev (AIN)	6	6

Second round
6	C Ruud (NOR)	4	6	6
Alt	A Vavassori (ITA)	6	4	3
F Cerúndolo (ARG)	7	6^{5}	7
10	U Humbert (FRA)	5	7^{7}	5
13	F Auger-Aliassime (CAN)	6	6
M Marterer (GER)	0	1
S Ofner (AUT)	2	2
4	D Medvedev (AIN)	6	6

Third round
6	C Ruud (NOR)	6	6
F Cerúndolo (ARG)	3	4
13	F Auger-Aliassime (CAN)	6	7^{7}
4	D Medvedev (AIN)	3	6^{5}

Quarterfinals
6	C Ruud (NOR)	4	7^{10}	3
13	F Auger-Aliassime (CAN)	6	6^{8}	6

==== Section 4 ====
First round
Alt	F Cabral (POR)	2	2
J-L Struff (GER)	6	6
C Moutet (FRA)	6	2	7
S Nagal (IND)	2	6	5
J Menšík (CZE)	6	6
A Shevchenko (KAZ)	3	4
L Darderi (ITA)	3	4
9	T Paul (USA)	6	6
15	A Tabilo (CHI)	4	4
R Safiullin (AIN)	6	6
TM Etcheverry (ARG)	7^{9}	6
T Seyboth Wild (BRA)	6^{7}	2
T Griekspoor (NED)	6	6
Alt	P Tsitsipas (GRE)	2	3
Alt	H Habib (LBN)	3	1
2	C Alcaraz (ESP)	6	6

Second round
J-L Struff (GER)
C Moutet (FRA)	w/o
J Menšík (CZE)	3	1
9	T Paul (USA)	6	6
R Safiullin (AIN)	6	7^{7}
TM Etcheverry (ARG)	0	6^{1}
T Griekspoor (NED)	1	6^{3}
2	C Alcaraz (ESP)	6	7^{7}

Third round
C Moutet (FRA)	6^{5}	3
9	T Paul (USA)	7^{7}	6
R Safiullin (AIN)	4	2
2	C Alcaraz (ESP)	6	6

Quarterfinals
9	T Paul (USA)	3	6^{7}
2	C Alcaraz (ESP)	6	7^{9}
