= Men's épée at the 2022 World Fencing Championships =

- Venue: Cairo Stadium Indoor Halls Complex
- Location: Cairo, Egypt
- Dates: 16 July (qualification); 19 July
- Competitors: 192 from 70 nations

Medalists
gold medal	Romain Cannone	France
silver medal	Kazuyasu Minobe	Japan
bronze medal	Neisser Loyola	Belgium
bronze medal	Ihor Reizlin	Ukraine

The Men's épée competition at the 2022 World Fencing Championships was held on 19 July 2022. The qualification was held on 16 July.

== Draw ==
=== Finals ===
Semifinals
(France) Romain Cannone	15
(Belgium) Neisser Loyola	14
(Ukraine) Ihor Reizlin	12
(Japan) Kazuyasu Minobe	13

Final
(France) Romain Cannone	15
(Japan) Kazuyasu Minobe	12

=== Top half ===
==== Section 1 ====
Round of 64
(France) Romain Cannone	15
(Ukraine) Roman Svichkar	12
(Switzerland) Lucas Malcotti	13
(Sweden) Jonathan Svensson	15
(Germany) Samuel Unterhauser	2
(Estonia) Sten Priinits	15
(Spain) Manuel Bargues	5
(Italy) Federico Vismara	15
(Kazakhstan) Ruslan Kurbanov	15
(Germany) Lukas Bellmann	12
(China) Lan Minghao	15
(Germany) Marco Brinkmann	9
(Spain) Gerard Gonell	15
(Denmark) Kenneth Knudsen	9
(Czech Republic) Martin Rubeš	11
(Egypt) Mohamed El-Sayed	15

Round of 32
(France) Romain Cannone	15
(Sweden) Jonathan Svensson	9
(Estonia) Sten Priinits	8
(Italy) Federico Vismara	15
(Kazakhstan) Ruslan Kurbanov	15
(China) Lan Minghao	14
(Spain) Gerard Gonell	15
(Egypt) Mohamed El-Sayed	7

Round of 16
(France) Romain Cannone	15
(Italy) Federico Vismara	12
(Kazakhstan) Ruslan Kurbanov	15
(Spain) Gerard Gonell	8

Quarterfinals
(France) Romain Cannone	15
(Kazakhstan) Ruslan Kurbanov	13

==== Section 2 ====
Round of 64
(Venezuela) Rubén Limardo	15
(Netherlands) David van Nunen	10
(Ukraine) Volodymyr Stankevych	15
(Hungary) Tibor Andrásfi	9
(Italy) Gabriele Cimini	13
(Belgium) Neisser Loyola	15
(Ukraine) Yan Sych	14
(Switzerland) Max Heinzer	15
(Morocco) Houssam El Kord	15
(Portugal) Max Rod	7
(Czech Republic) Michal Čupr	9
(Kazakhstan) Elmir Alimzhanov	15
(Denmark) Conrad Seibæk Kongstad	14
(Israel) Ido Harper	15
(Uzbekistan) Fayzulla Alimov	11
(Hungary) Gergely Siklósi	12

Round of 32
(Venezuela) Rubén Limardo	11
(Ukraine) Volodymyr Stankevych	15
(Belgium) Neisser Loyola	15
(Switzerland) Max Heinzer	11
(Morocco) Houssam El Kord	12
(Kazakhstan) Elmir Alimzhanov	15
(Israel) Ido Harper	13
(Hungary) Gergely Siklósi	15

Round of 16
(Ukraine) Volodymyr Stankevych	13
(Belgium) Neisser Loyola	14
(Kazakhstan) Elmir Alimzhanov	15
(Hungary) Gergely Siklósi	9

Quarterfinals
(Belgium) Neisser Loyola	15
(Kazakhstan) Elmir Alimzhanov	8

=== Bottom half ===
==== Section 3 ====
Round of 64
(Italy) Andrea Santarelli	6
(Colombia) Jhon Édison Rodríguez	15
(Argentina) Jesús Lugones	9
(Hong Kong) Fong Hoi Sun	15
(Spain) Juan Romero	11
(Italy) Davide Di Veroli	15
(Germany) Richard Schmidt	9
(France) Nelson Lopez-Pourtier	15
(Hungary) Máté Koch	14
(United States) Yeisser Ramirez	11
(Azerbaijan) Barat Guliyev	13
(Luxembourg) Flavio Giannotte	12
(Netherlands) Tristan Tulen	15
(Hong Kong) Ho Wai Hang	13
(Uzbekistan) Roman Aleksandrov	9
(Ukraine) Ihor Reizlin	12

Round of 32
(Colombia) Jhon Édison Rodríguez	14
(Hong Kong) Fong Hoi Sun	15
(Italy) Davide Di Veroli	15
(France) Nelson Lopez-Pourtier	9
(Hungary) Máté Koch	14
(Azerbaijan) Barat Guliyev	6
(Netherlands) Tristan Tulen	12
(Ukraine) Ihor Reizlin	13

Round of 16
(Hong Kong) Fong Hoi Sun	15
(Italy) Davide Di Veroli	11
(Hungary) Máté Koch	10
(Ukraine) Ihor Reizlin	15

Quarterfinals
(Hong Kong) Fong Hoi Sun	13
(Ukraine) Ihor Reizlin	14

==== Section 4 ====
Round of 64
(France) Alexandre Bardenet	15
(India) Udaivir Singh	10
(Poland) Mateusz Antkiewicz	14
(South Korea) Park Sang-young	13
(Egypt) Mohamed Yasseen	15
(Poland) Radosław Zawrotniak	10
(Kazakhstan) Vadim Sharlaimov	14
(Japan) Koki Kano	15
(Japan) Masaru Yamada	14
(Hungary) Dávid Nagy	10
(Egypt) Ahmed El-Sayed	15
(Canada) Dylan French	13
(Japan) Kazuyasu Minobe	15
(Canada) Nicholas Zhang	9
(Denmark) August Lindstrøm Jensen	4
(France) Yannick Borel	15

Round of 32
(France) Alexandre Bardenet	13
(Poland) Mateusz Antkiewicz	12
(Egypt) Mohamed Yasseen	9
(Japan) Koki Kano	15
(Japan) Masaru Yamada	15
(Egypt) Ahmed El-Sayed	11
(Japan) Kazuyasu Minobe	15
(France) Yannick Borel	13

Round of 16
(France) Alexandre Bardenet	12
(Japan) Koki Kano	15
(Japan) Masaru Yamada	13
(Japan) Kazuyasu Minobe	14

Quarterfinals
(Japan) Koki Kano	11
(Japan) Kazuyasu Minobe	12
