= Fencing at the 2023 European Games – Men's team épée =

Men's team épée at the 2023 European Games
- Venue: Tauron Arena Kraków
- Location: Kraków, Poland
- Date: 30 June
- Competitors: 87 from 24 nations
- Teams: 24

Medalists
gold medal	Tibor Andrásfi; Máté Tamás Koch; Dávid Nagy; Gergely Siklósi	Hungary
silver medal	Alexis Bayard; Théo Brochard; Hadrien Favre; Max Heinzer	Switzerland
bronze medal	Gabriele Cimini; Davide Di Veroli; Andrea Santarelli; Federico Vismara	Italy

The men's team épée competition at the 2023 European Games in Kraków was held on 30 June 2023.

== Results ==
=== Main bracket ===
Round of 32
Azerbaijan	41
Estonia	43
Netherlands	45
North Macedonia	17
Bulgaria	35
Poland	45
Austria	45
Finland	43
Luxembourg	29
Denmark	45
Sweden	45
Latvia	18
Greece	21
Germany	45
Portugal	43
Belgium	45

Round of 16
France	45
Estonia	37
Netherlands	39
Czech Republic	40
Israel	42
Poland	45
Austria	38
Switzerland	45
Hungary	45
Denmark	32
Sweden	34
Spain	45
Ukraine	44
Germany	37
Belgium	16
Italy	45

Quarterfinals
France	45
Czech Republic	26
Poland	23
Switzerland	28
Hungary	37
Spain	32
Ukraine	28
Italy	43

Semifinals
France	43
Switzerland	45
Hungary	45
Italy	35

Final
Switzerland	26
Hungary	28
Third place
France	37
Italy	39

=== 5–8th place bracket ===
5–8th place semifinals
Czech Republic	43
Poland	26
Spain	42
Ukraine	45

Fifth place
Czech Republic	30
Ukraine	45
Seventh place
Poland	35
Spain	36

=== 9–16th place bracket ===
9–16th place quarterfinals
Estonia	34
Netherlands	33
Israel	45
Austria	36
Denmark	45
Sweden	39
Germany	45
Belgium	33

9–12th place semifinals
Estonia	41
Israel	45
Denmark	36
Germany	45

Ninth place
Israel	45
Germany	32
Eleventh place
Estonia	45
Denmark	37

=== 13–16th place bracket ===
13–16th place semifinals
Netherlands	45
Austria	39
Sweden	45
Belgium	38

13th place
Netherlands	35
Sweden	43
15th place
Austria	33
Belgium	45

== Final ranking ==
Rank	Team	Rank	Team	Rank	Team	Rank	Team
1st place, gold medalist(s)	Hungary; Tibor Andrásfi; Máté Tamás Koch; Dávid Nagy; Gergely Siklósi	7	Spain; Manuel Bargues; Álvaro Ibáñez; Yulen Pereira; Juan Pedro Romero	13	Sweden; Hugo Brandberg; Linus Islas Flygare; Christopher Kelly; Jonathan Svensson	19	Finland; Akseli Heinämaa; Jaakko Paavolainen; Topias Tauriainen; Niko Vuorinen
2nd place, silver medalist(s)	Switzerland; Alexis Bayard; Théo Brochard; Hadrien Favre; Max Heinzer	8	Poland; Mateusz Antkiewicz; Maciej Bielec; Wojciech Lubieniecki; Mateusz Nycz	14	Netherlands; Ruben Derksen; Rafael Tulen; Tristan Tulen; David van Nunen	20	Luxembourg; Flavio Giannotte; Benoit Omont; Niklas Prinz
3rd place, bronze medalist(s)	Italy; Gabriele Cimini; Davide Di Veroli; Andrea Santarelli; Federico Vismara	9	Israel; Grigori Beskin; Yonatan Cohen; Yuval Freilich; Ido Harper	15	Belgium; Felix Blommaert; François-Xavier Ferot; Marc Housieaux; Neisser Loyola	21	Bulgaria; Marin Atanasov; Ilia Chakarov; Yordan Galabov; Svetlozar Iskrov
4	France; Alexandre Bardenet; Romain Cannone; Alex Fava; Nelson Lopez-Pourtier	10	Germany; Nikolaus Bodoczi; Marco Brinkmann; Richard Schmidt; Samuel Unterhauser	16	Austria; Alexander Biro; Josef Mahringer; Jan Schuhmann	22	Latvia; Gints Baķis; Ernests Cimborevičs; Daniels Loginovs; Aleksandrs Ostapenko
5	Ukraine; Nikita Koshman; Ievgen Makiienko; Volodymyr Stankevych; Yan Sych	11	Estonia; Ruslan Eskov; Sten Priinits; Jüri Salm; Erik Tobias	17	Portugal; Filipe Frazão; Miguel Frazão; Max Rod	23	Greece; Konstantinos Karampasis; Savvas Kavvadias; Ioannis Markopoulos; Panagiotis Theodoropoulos
6	Czech Republic; Jiří Beran; Michal Čupr; Jakub Jurka; Martin Rubeš	12	Denmark; August Lindstrøm Jensen; Patrick Jørgensen; Conrad Seibæk Kongstad; Frederik von der Osten	18	Azerbaijan; Kanan Aliyev; Barat Guliyev; Ruslan Hasanov	24	North Macedonia; Petar Damjanovski; Nikola Nikolovski; Petar Srbinovski; Matej Todorovski
