= Fencing at the 2024 Summer Olympics =

Fencing at the Games of the XXXIII Olympiad
- Venue: Grand Palais
- Dates: 27 July – 4 August 2024
- No. of events: 12 (6 men, 6 women)
- Competitors: 212 from 52 nations

The fencing competitions at the 2024 Summer Olympics in Paris were run from 27 July to 4 August at the Grand Palais strip. A total of 212 fencers, with an equal distribution between men and women, competed across twelve medal events at the Games. For the second straight time, Paris 2024 witnessed both men and women fence against each other in the individual and team events held in all three weapons (foil, épée, and sabre).

== Qualification ==
212 fencing quota places, with an equal distribution between men and women, were available for Paris 2024, similar to the Tokyo 2020 roster size. Qualified NOCs could enter a maximum of eighteen fencers (nine per gender), with each consisting of a trio, whether men's or women's, across all weapon-based team events (foil, épée, and sabre).

About two-thirds of the total quota were attributed to the world's top fencers based on the points accrued in the Fédération Internationale d'Escrime (FIE) Official Ranking between 3 April 2023 and 1 April 2024, with further individual places available at each of the four zonal qualifying tournaments (Africa, Asia & Oceania, Europe, and the Americas).

The team events offered eight to nine spots for all registered NOCs competing in each weapon. Each team had to be composed of three fencers (or a fencing trio). The top four teams in each weapon qualified directly for the Games, with the next set of places assigned to the highest-ranked nation from each of the continental zones (Africa, Asia & Oceania, Europe, and the Americas) between fifth and sixteenth position. If a zone did not field any teams within the specific ranking (from fifth to sixteenth place), the top-ranked team eligible for qualification secured a spot irrespective of the continent.

For the individual events, quota places varied from a minimum of 34 to a maximum of 37. With the team members directly entered into their respective individual competitions, six more places were awarded to the eligible fencers based on the FIE Adjusted Official Ranking list by the continental zone of 1 April 2024: the top two fencers each from Europe and Asia & Oceania; and the highest-ranked fencer each from the Americas and Africa. The zonal qualifying tournaments offered four available spots with one each to the NOCs without a qualified fencer, male or female, in one or more weapons by the two previous pathways.

Host nation France reserved six quota places to be distributed between the team and individual events, respecting the eighteen-member NOC limit and the 37-fencer limit for each weapon-based individual event. Two further spots are entitled to the eligible NOCs interested to have their fencers compete in Paris 2024 under the Universality rules.

=== Olga Kharlan qualification in sabre fencing ===
Since 1 July 2020 (and reconfirmed by Fédération Internationale d'Escrime (FIE) public notice in September 2020 and in January 2021), by public written notice the FIE had replaced its previous handshake requirement with a "salute" by the opposing fencers, and written in its public notice that handshakes were "suspended until further notice." Nevertheless, in July 2023 Ukrainian four-time world fencing individual sabre champion Olga Kharlan was disqualified at the World Fencing Championships by the Fédération Internationale d'Escrime for not shaking the hand of her defeated Russian opponent, though Kharlan instead offered a tapping of blades in acknowledgement. Thomas Bach stepped in the next day. As President of the International Olympic Committee (IOC), he sent a letter to Kharlan in which he expressed empathy for her, and wrote that in light of the situation she was being guaranteed a spot in the 2024 Summer Olympics. He wrote further: "as a fellow fencer, it is impossible for me to imagine how you feel at this moment. The war against your country, the suffering of the people in Ukraine, the uncertainty around your participation at the Fencing World Championships ... and then the events which unfolded yesterday – all this is a roller coaster of emotions and feelings. It is admirable how you are managing this incredibly difficult situation, and I would like to express my full support to you. Rest assured that the IOC will continue to stand in full solidarity with the Ukrainian athletes and the Olympic community of Ukraine."

== Competition schedule ==
Legend
Q	Elimination and quarterfinals	F	Semi-finals and final medal matches

Schedule
Event↓/Date →	Sat 27		Sun 28		Mon 29		Tue 30		Wed 31		Thu 1		Fri 2		Sat 3		Sun 4	
Event	M	A	M	A	M	A	M	A	M	A	M	A	M	A	M	A	M	A
Men's
Men's épée			Q	F														
Men's team épée													Q	F				
Men's foil					Q	F												
Men's team foil																	Q	F
Men's sabre	Q	F																
Men's team sabre									Q	F								
Women's
Women's épée	Q	F																
Women's team épée							Q	F										
Women's foil			Q	F														
Women's team foil											Q	F						
Women's sabre					Q	F												
Women's team sabre															Q	F		

M = Morning session, A = Afternoon session

== Medal summary ==
=== Medal table ===
* Host nation (France)

Rank	NOC	Gold	Silver	Bronze	Total
1	Japan	2	1	2	5
2	United States	2	1	1	4
3	South Korea	2	1	0	3
4	Hong Kong	2	0	0	2
5	France*	1	4	2	7
6	Italy	1	3	1	5
7	Hungary	1	1	1	3
8	Ukraine	1	0	1	2
9	Tunisia	0	1	0	1
10	Canada	0	0	1	1
10	Czech Republic	0	0	1	1
10	Egypt	0	0	1	1
10	Poland	0	0	1	1
Totals (13 entries)		12	12	12	36

=== Men's events ===
Event	Gold	Silver	Bronze
Individual épée	Koki Kano; Japan	Yannick Borel; France	Mohamed El-Sayed; Egypt
Team épée	Hungary; Máté Tamás Koch; Tibor Andrásfi; Gergely Siklósi; Dávid Nagy	Japan; Akira Komata; Koki Kano; Masaru Yamada; Kazuyasu Minobe	Czech Republic; Jiří Beran; Jakub Jurka; Martin Rubeš; Michal Čupr
Individual foil	Cheung Ka Long; Hong Kong	Filippo Macchi; Italy	Nick Itkin; United States
Team foil	Japan; Kyosuke Matsuyama; Takahiro Shikine; Kazuki Iimura; Yudai Nagano	Italy; Guillaume Bianchi; Filippo Macchi; Tommaso Marini; Alessio Foconi	France; Maximilien Chastanet; Maxime Pauty; Enzo Lefort; Julien Mertine
Individual sabre	Oh Sang-uk; South Korea	Fares Ferjani; Tunisia	Luigi Samele; Italy
Team sabre	South Korea; Gu Bon-gil; Oh Sang-uk; Park Sang-won; Do Gyeong-dong	Hungary; Csanád Gémesi; András Szatmári; Áron Szilágyi; Krisztián Rabb	France; Sébastien Patrice; Maxime Pianfetti; Boladé Apithy; Jean-Philippe Patrice

=== Women's events ===
Event	Gold	Silver	Bronze
Individual épée	Vivian Kong; Hong Kong	Auriane Mallo-Breton; France	Eszter Muhari; Hungary
Team épée	Italy; Rossella Fiamingo; Mara Navarria; Giulia Rizzi; Alberta Santuccio	France; Marie-Florence Candassamy; Alexandra Louis-Marie; Auriane Mallo-Breton; Coraline Vitalis	Poland; Aleksandra Jarecka; Alicja Klasik; Renata Knapik-Miazga; Martyna Swatowska-Wenglarczyk
Individual foil	Lee Kiefer; United States	Lauren Scruggs; United States	Eleanor Harvey; Canada
Team foil	United States; Jacqueline Dubrovich; Lee Kiefer; Lauren Scruggs; Maia Weintraub	Italy; Arianna Errigo; Martina Favaretto; Alice Volpi; Francesca Palumbo	Japan; Sera Azuma; Yuka Ueno; Karin Miyawaki; Komaki Kikuchi
Individual sabre	Manon Apithy-Brunet; France	Sara Balzer; France	Olga Kharlan; Ukraine
Team sabre	Ukraine; Yuliya Bakastova; Alina Komashchuk; Olga Kharlan; Olena Kravatska	South Korea; Choi Se-bin; Jeon Ha-young; Jeon Eun-hye; Yoon Ji-su	Japan; Risa Takashima; Seri Ozaki; Misaki Emura; Shihomi Fukushima

== Accomplishments ==
Individual events:

- Eleanor Harvey became the first Canadian to win a fencing medal.
- Koki Kano became the first Japanese fencer to win an individual gold medal.
- Oh Sang-uk won South Korea’s first individual gold medal in men’s sabre.
- Mohamed El-Sayed won Egypt’s first individual medal in men’s Épée.
- Farès Ferjani became the first Tunisian man to win a fencing medal.
- Vivian Kong won Hong Kong's first women’s fencing medal.
- Manon Brunet won France’s first gold medal in individual women’s sabre.
- Lee Kiefer became only the third woman to win consecutive gold medals in women’s individual foil, and the first American to win three Gold medals in fencing.
- Cheung Ka Long became only the third man to win consecutive gold medals in men’s individual foil, and the first person from Hong Kong to win multiple fencing medals.
- Lauren Scruggs became the first black woman to win an individual medal in women’s foil.

Team events:

- South Korea's men’s sabre team became the first non-European country to win 3-consecutive gold.
- Japan's men’s foil team became the first non-European country to win gold.
- Japan’s women's foil team won their country's first medal in women’s fencing.
- United States’ women’s foil team became their country’s first to win gold in any team event, and the first non-European team to win gold.
- Ukraine became the first nation to win multiple women’s team sabre gold medals.
- Italy won its first gold in women's team Épée.
- Czech Republic won its first medal in men's team Épée.
- Poland won its first medal in women’s team Épée.

== See also ==
- Fencing at the 2022 Asian Games
- Fencing at the 2023 European Games
- Fencing at the 2023 Pan American Games
- Wheelchair fencing at the 2024 Summer Paralympics
