= Men's épée at the 2023 World Fencing Championships =

- Venue: Milan Convention Center
- Location: Milan, Italy
- Dates: 23 July (qualification); 26 July (final)
- Competitors: 243 from 89 nations

Medalists
| gold medal | Máté Tamás Koch | Hungary |
| silver medal | Davide Di Veroli | Italy |
| bronze medal | Romain Cannone | France |
| bronze medal | Ruslan Kurbanov | Kazakhstan |

The Men's épée competition at the 2023 World Fencing Championships was held on 26 July 2023. The qualification was held on 23 July.

== Draw ==
=== Finals ===
Semifinals
(Italy) Davide Di Veroli | 15
(France) Romain Cannone | 5
(Hungary) Máté Tamás Koch | 15
(Kazakhstan) Ruslan Kurbanov | 11

Final
(Italy) Davide Di Veroli | 10
(Hungary) Máté Tamás Koch | 14

=== Top half ===
==== Section 1 ====
Round of 64
(Italy) Davide Di Veroli | 15
(South Africa) Sergey Losevskiy | 5
(Germany) Marco Brinkmann | 14
(Poland) Mateusz Antkiewicz | 15
(China) Wang Zijie | 15
(Poland) Radosław Zawrotniak | 11
(Finland) Jaakko Paavolainen | 15
(Kazakhstan) Elmir Alimzhanov | 14
(Venezuela) Rubén Limardo | 11
(Israel) Grigori Beskin | 14
(Venezuela) Francisco Limardo | 15
(Egypt) Mohamed Yasseen | 12
(Hong Kong) Nicholas Chau | 13
(United States) Tristan Szapary | 14
(Croatia) Jakov Šola | 9
(Japan) Kazuyasu Minobe | 15

Round of 32
(Italy) Davide Di Veroli | 15
(Poland) Mateusz Antkiewicz | 4
(China) Wang Zijie | 12
(Finland) Jaakko Paavolainen | 13
(Israel) Grigori Beskin | 7
(Venezuela) Francisco Limardo | 15
(United States) Tristan Szapary | 8
(Japan) Kazuyasu Minobe | 15

Round of 16
(Italy) Davide Di Veroli | 15
(Finland) Jaakko Paavolainen | 14
(Venezuela) Francisco Limardo | 9
(Japan) Kazuyasu Minobe | 8

Quarterfinals
(Italy) Davide Di Veroli | 15
(Venezuela) Francisco Limardo | 12

==== Section 2 ====
Round of 64
(Belgium) Neisser Loyola | 11
(Vietnam) Nguyễn Tiến Nhật | 8
(Finland) Niko Vuorinen | 15
(Poland) Maciej Bielec | 11
(China) Yu Lefan | 9
(Israel) Ido Harper | 15
(Spain) Manuel Bargues | 15
(China) Lan Minghao | 10
(Ukraine) Ihor Reizlin
Vadim Anokhin | w/o
(Switzerland) Max Heinzer | 15
(Australia) Lachlan Crook | 11
(Japan) Akira Komata | 10
(Switzerland) Alexis Bayard | 11
(United Kingdom) William East | 13
(France) Romain Cannone | 15

Round of 32
(Belgium) Neisser Loyola | 13
(Finland) Niko Vuorinen | 15
(Israel) Ido Harper | 12
(Spain) Manuel Bargues | 15
Vadim Anokhin | 15
(Switzerland) Max Heinzer | 8
(Switzerland) Alexis Bayard | 13
(France) Romain Cannone | 15

Round of 16
(Finland) Niko Vuorinen | 15
(Spain) Manuel Bargues | 11
Vadim Anokhin | 13
(France) Romain Cannone | 15

Quarterfinals
(Finland) Niko Vuorinen | 9
(France) Romain Cannone | 15

=== Bottom half ===
==== Section 3 ====
Round of 64
(Hungary) Gergely Siklósi | 15
(United Kingdom) Matthew Cooper | 5
(Netherlands) David van Nunen | 15
(South Korea) Ma Se-geon | 14
(Czech Republic) Jiří Beran | 15
(Uzbekistan) Javokhirbek Nurmatov | 8
(Israel) Yonatan Cohen | 14
(Colombia) Jhon Édison Rodríguez | 15
(Hungary) Máté Tamás Koch | 15
(Sweden) Linus Islas Flygare | 7
(Hungary) Tibor Andrásfi | 13
(Sweden) Christopher Kelly | 6
(South Korea) Kweon Youn-gjun | 15
(Kazakhstan) Vadim Sharlaimov | 13
(Luxembourg) Flavio Giannotte | 15
(France) Alexandre Bardenet | 10

Round of 32
(Hungary) Gergely Siklósi | 15
(Netherlands) David van Nunen | 7
(Czech Republic) Jiří Beran | 9
(Colombia) Jhon Édison Rodríguez | 15
(Hungary) Máté Tamás Koch | 15
(Hungary) Tibor Andrásfi | 7
(South Korea) Kweon Youn-gjun | 12
(Luxembourg) Flavio Giannotte | 15

Round of 16
(Hungary) Gergely Siklósi | 14
(Colombia) Jhon Édison Rodríguez | 5
(Hungary) Máté Tamás Koch | 15
(Luxembourg) Flavio Giannotte | 8

Quarterfinals
(Hungary) Gergely Siklósi | 12
(Hungary) Máté Tamás Koch | 15

==== Section 4 ====
Round of 64
(Italy) Federico Vismara | 15
(Croatia) Vedran Markota | 13
(France) Yannick Borel | 15
(Sweden) Jonathan Svensson | 10
(Denmark) Conrad Seibæk Kongstad | 15
(Netherlands) Tristan Tulen | 9
(Austria) Josef Mahringer | 14
(Kazakhstan) Ruslan Kurbanov | 15
(Italy) Valerio Cuomo | 15
(Kazakhstan) Yerlik Sertay | 13
(Israel) Yuval Freilich | 15
(Portugal) Miguel Frazão | 4
(Japan) Ryu Matsumoto | 15
(France) Gaétan Billa | 11
(Canada) Dylan French | 9
(Japan) Koki Kano | 10

Round of 32
(Italy) Federico Vismara | 13
(France) Yannick Borel | 14
(Denmark) Conrad Seibæk Kongstad | 7
(Kazakhstan) Ruslan Kurbanov | 10
(Italy) Valerio Cuomo | 15
(Israel) Yuval Freilich | 9
(Japan) Ryu Matsumoto | 5
(Japan) Koki Kano | 15

Round of 16
(France) Yannick Borel | 14
(Kazakhstan) Ruslan Kurbanov | 15
(Italy) Valerio Cuomo | 15
(Japan) Koki Kano | 13

Quarterfinals
(Kazakhstan) Ruslan Kurbanov | 15
(Italy) Valerio Cuomo | 12
