= Czech Republic at the 2024 Summer Olympics =

- IOC code: CZE
- NOC: Czech Olympic Committee
- Website: www.olympic.cz (in Czech and English)

in Paris, France 26 July 2024 – 11 August 2024
- Competitors: 111 (62 men and 49 women) in 23 sports
- Flag bearers (opening): Lukáš Krpálek; Marie Horáčková
- Flag bearers (closing): Martin Fuksa; Nikola Ogrodníková
- Medals Ranked 28th: Gold 3 Silver 0 Bronze 2 Total 5

Summer Olympics appearances (overview)
- 1996; 2000; 2004; 2008; 2012; 2016; 2020; 2024; 2028

Other related appearances
- Bohemia (1900–1912); Czechoslovakia (1924–1992)

The Czech Republic, officially named Czechia by the IOC, competed at the 2024 Summer Olympics in Paris from 26 July to 11 August 2024. Czech athletes have appeared in every edition of the Summer Olympic Games, except for three occasions: Athens 1896, St. Louis 1904 and Los Angeles 1984 as part of the Soviet boycott. It is the nation's eighth consecutive appearance at the Summer Olympics after splitting from the former Czechoslovakia.

The Czech Republic left Paris with a total of five Olympic medals (three gold and two bronze), the least amount of medals in the history of the country and least amount of medals since 1932 Summer Olympics. Two of the medals were awarded to the Czech team in canoeing, while the rest were awarded in fencing, tennis and track and field.

Among the medalists were that year French Open and Wimbledon champion in doubles Kateřina Siniaková, who captured her second consecutive gold medal in tennis, this time with Tomáš Macháč in mixed doubles, flatwater canoeist Josef Dostál picked up gold in the K-1 1000 m event, his fifth medal in four consecutive Games being the most decorated Czech athlete at the Summer Olympics since the breakup of the former Czechoslovakia. Martin Fuksa managed to win gold medal in the C-1 1000 metres event in best olympic time of 3:43.16.

Czech épée fencing team (Jiří Beran, Jakub Jurka, Martin Rubeš and Michal Čupr) won the bronze medal in the team event after defeating acting world champions and runner-ups from Italy and France. It was only the second medal from fencing competitions for the Czech Republic and fourth overall in the history of the Olympic Games. Nikola Ogrodníková won the bronze medal at the 2024 Summer Olympics making it the fifth consecutive medal in javelin throw for the Czech Republic and the eighth medal from the last nine Olympic Games in this sport.

Other notable achievements by Czech athletes include Radek Juška, who in long jump became only the second athlete who made it to the Olympic final for the Czech Republic or Czechoslovakia and with 8.15 m achieved the longest jump at the Olympic Games made by Czech or Czechoslovak athlete in history. Amálie Švábíková set a new national record at 4.80 m in pole vault; previous record was held by Jiřina Ptáčníková. Švábíková ended up 5th in the final, the second-best result in women's pole vault for Czech athlete at the Olympic games. In swimming Barbora Seemanová equaled her result from Tokyo at 6th place, the best result for a Czech swimmer since 2000 Summer Olympics. In Madison 7th place achieved by Jan Voneš and Denis Rugovac was the best result in this discipline for the Czech Republic so far and the best result achieved by Czech athlete in track cycling since 2004 Summer Olympics. Also 14th place of Mathias Vacek in road race was the best result of a Czech athlete in this event since 1988 Summer Olympics. Lukáš Rohan who was at the time of the competition in kayak cross marked as 136th in world ranking managed to get 4th place in the competition. Martin Vlach in men's pentathlon set a new Olympic record in shooting/running part of 713 points in the semifinal of the competition. It lasted one day, when Emiliano Hernández broke that record in the final with 720 points. Tomáš Staněk's 21.61 m in men's shot put in the semifinal was the best result by Czech athlete at the olympics. Tereza Hrochová equaled the best result by Czech athlete at the Olympic games in women's marathon at 26th place and achieved the best time by Czech or Czechoslovak athlete in this discipline at the olympics. Karolína Maňasová's participation in 100m race was only second one since 1972 Summer Olympics for Czech or Czechoslovak woman but her time 11.11 s was the fastest ever at this distance in history. Also the time of 1:45.62 achieved by Jakub Dudycha at the 800m distance was the best time by a Czech or Czechoslovak athlete ever at the Olympic games.

These Olympic Games mark the first time since independence when the Czech Republic didn't achieve any medal in canoe slalom, which is regarded as one of the most successful Czech olympic sports regarding the medal count.

== Medalists ==
The following Czech competitors won medals at the games. In the by-discipline sections below, medalists' names are bolded.

| Medal | Name | Sport | Event | Date |
|---|---|---|---|---|
| Gold | Kateřina Siniaková; Tomáš Macháč | Tennis | Mixed doubles | 2 August |
| Gold | Martin Fuksa | Canoeing | Men's C1 1000 m | 9 August |
| Gold | Josef Dostál | Canoeing | Men's K1 1000 m | 10 August |
| Bronze | Jiří Beran; Jakub Jurka; Martin Rubeš; Michal Čupr | Fencing | Men's team épée | 2 August |
| Bronze | Nikola Ogrodníková | Athletics | Women's javelin throw | 10 August |

**Medals by sport**
| **Sport** | 1st place, gold medalist(s) | 2nd place, silver medalist(s) | 3rd place, bronze medalist(s) | **Total** |
| Athletics | 0 | 0 | 1 | **1** |
| Canoeing | 2 | 0 | 0 | **2** |
| Fencing | 0 | 0 | 1 | **1** |
| Tennis | 1 | 0 | 0 | **1** |
| **Total** | **3** | **0** | **2** | **5** |

Medals by date
| **Day** | **Date** | 1st place, gold medalist(s) | 2nd place, silver medalist(s) | 3rd place, bronze medalist(s) | **Total** |
| 8 | 2 August | 1 | 0 | 1 | **2** |
| 15 | 9 August | 1 | 0 | 0 | **1** |
| 16 | 10 August | 1 | 0 | 1 | **2** |
| **Total** | | **3** | **0** | **2** | 5 |

Medals by gender
| Gender | 1st place, gold medalist(s) | 2nd place, silver medalist(s) | 3rd place, bronze medalist(s) | Total | Percentage |
| Male | 2 | 0 | 1 | **3** | 60% |
| Female | 0 | 0 | 1 | **1** | 20% |
| Mixed | 1 | 0 | 0 | **1** | 20% |
| Total | 3 | 0 | 2 | 5 | 100% |

Multiple medalists
| **Name** | **Sport** | 1st place, gold medalist(s) | 2nd place, silver medalist(s) | 3rd place, bronze medalist(s) | **Total** |
| —N/a | —N/a | 0 | 0 | 0 | **0** |

== Competitors ==
Czech Olympic Committee fielded a roster of 111 athletes, 62 men and 49 women, to compete across 23 sports at these Games; it was the nation's second smallest delegation sent to the Olympics since the breakup of the former Czechoslovakia. Czech Republic did not send teams in any of the collective sports for the second time in the nation's Olympic history. Of the 111 participants, 51 of them attended at least a single Olympiad, with the rest making their debut in Paris.

Track and field accounted for the largest number of athletes on the team with 30 entries although Czechia didn't enter a decathlon athlete for the first time in history. Also for the first time since 1956 Summer Olympics there was no athlete in wrestling competitions due to late injury of Artur Omarov. Table tennis, artistic gymnastics, sport climbing, triathlon and weightlifting all had a single competitor.

Nine of the nation's past Olympic medalists returned, including all of defending champions from Tokyo 2020: tennis players Barbora Krejčíková and Kateřina Siniaková, slalom canoeist Jiří Prskavec, judoka Lukáš Krpálek and trap shooter Jiří Lipták.

2016 and 2020 champion in judo Lukáš Krpálek, four-time medalist in sprint canoeing Josef Dostál, silver medalist in javelin throw from Tokyo Jakub Vadlejch, double sculls rowers Lenka Lukšová and Miroslav Vraštil and cross-country biker Ondřej Cink headed the full roster of Czech athletes by participating in their fourth Olympics as the most experienced competitors. They were followed by flatwater canoeists Martin Fuksa and double bronze medalist Daniel Havel, slalom canoeist Jiří Prskavec, bronze medalist in foil fencing Alexander Choupenitch, golfer Klára Davidson Spilková, beach player Barbora Hermannová, table tennis player Hana Matelová, swimmer Barbora Seemanová, shot putter Tomáš Staněk, pistol shooter Martin Podhráský, skeet shooter Jakub Tomeček and trap shooter Jiří Lipták, all of whom vied for their third Games.

Artistic gymnast Soňa Artamonová aged 16 years old was Czech Republic's youngest competitor, with épée fencer Jiří Beran and shooter Jiří Lipták rounding out the field as the oldest members (aged 42). Double canoeing champion Martin Doktor served as the team's chef de mission for the Games.

| Sport | Men | Women | Total |
|---|---|---|---|
| Archery | 1 | 1 | 2 |
| Athletics | 17 | 13 | 30 |
| Badminton | 3 | 1 | 4 |
| Canoeing | 7 | 4 | 11 |
| Cycling | 4 | 3 | 7 |
| Equestrian | 2 | 0 | 2 |
| Fencing | 5 | 0 | 5 |
| Golf | 0 | 2 | 2 |
| Gymnastics | 0 | 1 | 1 |
| Judo | 2 | 1 | 3 |
| Modern pentathlon | 2 | 2 | 4 |
| Rowing | 2 | 4 | 6 |
| Sailing | 0 | 3 | 3 |
| Shooting | 7 | 2 | 9 |
| Sport climbing | 1 | 0 | 1 |
| Swimming | 3 | 2 | 5 |
| Table tennis | 0 | 1 | 1 |
| Taekwondo | 0 | 2 | 2 |
| Tennis | 3 | 4 | 7 |
| Triathlon | 0 | 1 | 1 |
| Volleyball | 2 | 2 | 4 |
| Weightlifting | 1 | 0 | 1 |
| Total | 62 | 49 | 111 |

== Archery ==
World champion Marie Horáčková qualified for the women's individual recurve based on the results of the 2023 World Championships in Berlin, Germany; and Adam Li joined her at the 2024 Final Qualification Tournament in Antalya, Turkey.

| Athlete | Event | Ranking round | | Round of 64 | Round of 32 | Round of 16 | Quarterfinals | Semifinals | Final / BM | |
| Athlete | Event | Score | Seed | Opposition Score | Opposition Score | Opposition Score | Opposition Score | Opposition Score | Opposition Score | Rank |
|---|---|---|---|---|---|---|---|---|---|---|
| Adam Li | Men's individual | 627 | 61 | Bommadevara (IND); L 1–7 | Did not advance | | | | | =33 |
| Marie Horáčková | Women's individual | 651 | 31 | Abdusattorova (UZB); W 6–2 | Nam (KOR); L 3–7 | Did not advance | | | | =17 |
| Adam Li; Marie Horáčková | Mixed team | 1278 | 25 | —N/a | | Did not advance | | | | 25 |

== Athletics ==
Czech Republic track and field athletes achieved the entry standards for Paris 2024, nine of them by passing the direct qualifying mark (or time for track and road races – Lada Vondrová, Lurdes Gloria Manuel, Nikoleta Jíchová, Moira Stewartová, Tereza Hrochová, Amálie Švábíková, Tomáš Staněk, Jakub Vadlejch and Vít Müller), the others by world ranking, in the following events (a maximum of 3 athletes each):

Key

- Note–Ranks given for track events are within the athlete's heat only
- Q = Qualified for the next round
- q = Qualified for the next round as a fastest loser or, in field events, by position without achieving the qualifying target
- R = Qualified for the repechage round
- NR = National record
- N/A = Round not applicable for the event
- Bye = Athlete not required to compete in round

=== Track & road events ===
Men

| Athlete | Event | Heat | | | Repechage | | | Semifinal | | | Final | |
| Athlete | Event | Result | Rank | Overall | Result | Rank | Overall | Result | Rank | Overall | Result | Rank |
|---|---|---|---|---|---|---|---|---|---|---|---|---|
| Eduard Kubelík | 200 m | 21.14 | 8 R | 42 | 21.20 | 6 | 20 | Did not advance | | | | |
| Ondřej Macík | 200 m | 21.04 | 6 R | 41 | 21.14 | 5 | 19 | Did not advance | | | | |
| Tomáš Němejc | 200 m | 21.03 | 7 R | 40 | 20.84 | 5 | 15 | Did not advance | | | | |
| Matěj Krsek | 400 m | 45.71 | 8 R | 37 | 45.53 PB | 2 | 11 | Did not advance | | | | |
| Jakub Dudycha | 800 m | 1:45.62 | 4 R | 15 | 1:49.94 | 7 | 27 | Did not advance | | | | |
| Vít Müller | 400 m hurdles | 49.44 | 6 R | 25 | 48.96 | 3 | 8 | Did not advance | | | | |
| Tomáš Habarta | 3000 m steeplechase | DNF | | | —N/a | | | | | | Did not advance | |

Women

| Athlete | Event | Heat | | | Repechage | | | Semifinal | | | Final | |
| Athlete | Event | Result | Rank | Overall | Result | Rank | Overall | Result | Rank | Overall | Result | Rank |
|---|---|---|---|---|---|---|---|---|---|---|---|---|
| Karolína Maňasová | 100 m | 11.11 PB | 4 | 18 q | —N/a | | | 11.35 | 8 | 24 | Did not advance | |
| Lurdes Gloria Manuel | 400 m | 52.20 | 6 R | 38 | 50.81 | 3 | 6 q | 51.42 | 8 | 22 | Did not advance | |
| Tereza Petržilková | 400 m | 51.92 | 7 R | 35 | 51.46 SB | 4 | 15 | Did not advance | | | | |
| Lada Vondrová | 400 m | 51.80 | 5 R | 32 | 52.15 | 5 | 21 | Did not advance | | | | |
| Kristiina Mäki | 1500 m | 4:06.07 | 7 R | 26 | 4:07.80 | 5 | 14 | Did not advance | | | | |
| Nikoleta Jíchová | 400 m hurdles | 55.45 | 5 R | 25 | 55.31 | 4 | 12 | Did not advance | | | | |
| Tereza Hrochová | Marathon | —N/a | | | | | | | | | 2:30:00 | 26 |
| Moira Stewartová | Marathon | —N/a | | | | | | | | | 2:38:07 SB | 66 |
| Eliška Martínková | 20 km walk | —N/a | | | | | | | | | 1:32:30 | 27 |

Mixed

| Athlete | Event | Heat | | Final | | Notes |
| Athlete | Event | Result | Rank | Result | Rank | Notes |
|---|---|---|---|---|---|---|
| Vít Hlaváč; Eliška Martínková | Marathon walk relay | —N/a | | DNF | | >> |

Key: ~ = Loss of contact; > = Bent knee

=== Field events ===
Men

| Athlete | Event | Qualification | | Final | |
| Athlete | Event | Result | Rank | Result | Rank´ |
|---|---|---|---|---|---|
| Jan Štefela | High jump | 2.24 | =9 q | 2.22 | 9 |
| David Holý | Pole vault | 5.60 | =20 | Did not advance | |
| Matěj Ščerba | Pole vault | 5.40 | =23 | Did not advance | |
| Radek Juška | Long jump | 8.15 | 2 Q | 7.83 | 10 |
| Petr Meindlschmid | Long jump | 6.97 | 30 | Did not advance | |
| Tomáš Staněk | Shot put | 21.61 SB | 2 Q | 20.37 | 10 |
| Patrik Hájek | Hammer throw | 68.80 | 31 | Did not advance | |
| Volodymyr Myslyvčuk | Hammer throw | 73.84 | 16 | Did not advance | |
| Jakub Vadlejch | Javelin throw | 85.63 | 7 Q | 88.50 | 4 |

Women

| Athlete | Event | Qualification | | Final | |
| Athlete | Event | Result | Rank | Result | Rank |
|---|---|---|---|---|---|
| Michaela Hrubá | High jump | 1.88 | =15 | Did not advance | |
| Amálie Švábíková | Pole vault | 4.55 | =1 Q | 4.80 NR | 5 |
| Nikola Ogrodníková | Javelin throw | 61.16 | 11 q | 63.68 SB | 3rd place, bronze medalist(s) |
| Petra Sičáková | Javelin throw | 60.47 | 14 | Did not advance | |

== Badminton ==
Czech Republic entered four badminton players into the Olympic tournament based on the BWF Race to Paris Rankings.

| Athlete | Event | Group stage | | | | Elimination | Quarter-final | Semi-final | Final / BM | |
| Athlete | Event | Opposition Score | Opposition Score | Opposition Score | Rank | Opposition Score | Opposition Score | Opposition Score | Opposition Score | Rank |
|---|---|---|---|---|---|---|---|---|---|---|
| Jan Louda | Men's singles | Loh (SGP); L 0–2 (13–21, 10–21) | Canjura (ESA); W 2–0 (21–12, 21–10) | —N/a | 2 | Did not advance | | | | =14 |
| Ondřej Král; Adam Mendrek | Men's doubles | Kang / Seo (KOR); L 0–2 (12–21, 17–21) | Supak / Kittinupong (THA); L 0–2 (10–21, 13–21) | C. Popov / T. Popov (FRA); L 0–2 (18–21, 19–21) | 4 | —N/a | Did not advance | | | =13 |
| Tereza Švábíková | Women's singles | Buhrova (UKR); L 1–2 (19–21, 21–19, 18–21) | Tunjung (INA); L 0–2 (12–21, 18–21) | —N/a | 3 | Did not advance | | | | =27 |

== Canoeing ==
=== Slalom ===
Czech Republic entered four boats into the slalom competition, for the Games through the 2023 ICF Canoe Slalom World Championships in London, Great Britain.

| Athlete | Event | Preliminary | | | | | | Semifinal | | Final | |
| Athlete | Event | Run 1 | Rank | Run 2 | Rank | Best | Rank | Time | Rank | Time | Rank |
|---|---|---|---|---|---|---|---|---|---|---|---|
| Lukáš Rohan | Men's C-1 | 95.63 | 10 | 97.74 | 8 | 95.63 | 12 Q | 101.54 | 10 Q | 98.09 | 6 |
| Jiří Prskavec | Men's K-1 | 83.74 | 2 | 84.90 | 2 | 83.74 | 2 Q | 92.53 | 6 Q | 91.74 | 8 |
| Gabriela Satková | Women's C-1 | 99.44 | 1 | 106.54 | 7 | 99.44 | 1 Q | 105.55 | 1 Q | 114.22 | 7 |
| Antonie Galušková | Women's K-1 | 96.42 | 6 | 94.49 | 5 | 94.49 | 5 Q | 155.66 | 21 | Did not advance | |

=== Kayak cross ===
| Athlete | Event | Time trial | | Round 1 | Repechage | Heats | Quarterfinal | Semifinal | Small Final | Final | |
| Athlete | Event | Time | Rank | Position | Position | Position | Position | Position | Position | Position | Rank |
|---|---|---|---|---|---|---|---|---|---|---|---|
| Lukáš Rohan | Men's KX-1 | 69.80 | 15 | 2 Q | Bye | 2 Q | 2 Q | 2 Q | —N/a | 4 | 4 |
| Jiří Prskavec | Men's KX-1 | 71.71 | 21 | 3 R | 1 Q | 2 Q | 3 | Did not advance | | | 11 |
| Tereza Fišerová | Women's KX-1 | 81.17 | 33 | 3 R | 1 Q | 3 | Did not advance | | | | 23 |
| Antonie Galušková | Women's KX-1 | 73.75 | 11 | 1 Q | Bye | 4 | Did not advance | | | | 25 |

=== Sprint ===
Czech canoeists qualified three boats in each of the following distances for the Games through the 2023 ICF Canoe Sprint World Championships in Duisburg, Germany; and 2024 European Qualifier in Szeged, Hungary.

| Athlete | Event | Heats | | Quarterfinals | | Semifinals | | Final | |
| Athlete | Event | Time | Rank | Time | Rank | Time | Rank | Time | Rank |
|---|---|---|---|---|---|---|---|---|---|
| Josef Dostál | Men's K-1 1000 m | 3:37.83 | 2 SF | Bye | | 3:29.05 | 3 FA | 3:24.07 | 1st place, gold medalist(s) |
| Daniel Havel; Jakub Špicar | Men's K-2 500 m | 1:29.73 | 3 QF | 1:28.36 | 1 SF | 1:28.71 | 3 FA | 1:29.29 | 7 |
| Martin Fuksa | Men's C-1 1000 m | 3:50.39 | 1 SF | Bye | | 3:44.69 | 1 FA | 3:43.16 OB | 1st place, gold medalist(s) |
| Martin Fuksa; Petr Fuksa | Men's C-2 500 m | 1:41.49 | 3 QF | 1:41.02 | 3 SF | 1:42.69 | 4 FA | 1:41.83 | 7 |
| Anežka Paloudová | Women's K-1 500 m | 1:51.90 | 3 R | 1:49.43 | 1 SF | 1:51.47 | 4 FB | 1:54.31 | 15 |

Qualification Legend: R = Qualify to repechage; QF = Qualify to quarterfinal; SF = Qualify to semifinal; FA = Qualify to final (medal); FB = Qualify to final B (non-medal)

== Cycling ==
=== Road ===
The Czech Republic entered one male and one female rider to compete in the road race events at the Olympic. The Czech Republic secured those quota through the UCI Nation Ranking. The Czech cycling union selected Julia Kopecký and Mathias Vacek to the team.

| Athlete | Event | Time | Rank |
|---|---|---|---|
| Mathias Vacek | Men's road race | 6:21:25 | 14 |
| Mathias Vacek | Men's time trial | 37:55.62 | 11 |
| Julia Kopecký | Women's road race | 4:07:00 | 36 |
| Julia Kopecký | Women's time trial | 44:53.75 | 28 |

=== Track ===
Czech Republic entered two riders for men's omnium and madison events, based on the nations performances, through the final UCI Olympic rankings.

Omnium

| Athlete | Event | Scratch race | | Tempo race | | Elimination race | | Points race | | Total | |
| Athlete | Event | Points | Rank | Points | Rank | Points | Rank | Points | Rank | Points | Rank |
|---|---|---|---|---|---|---|---|---|---|---|---|
| Denis Rugovac* | Men's omnium | DNS | | | | | | | | | |
| Jan Voneš | Men's omnium | 8 | 17 | 32 | 5 | 14 | 14 | 2 | 11 | 56 | 12 |

* Denis Rugovac started as reserve for Jan Voneš.

Madison

| Athlete | Event | Points | Laps | Total | |
| Athlete | Event | Points | Laps | Points | Rank |
|---|---|---|---|---|---|
| Denis Rugovac; Jan Voneš | Men's madison | 12 | 0 | 12 | 7 |

=== Mountain biking ===
Czech mountain bikers secured two quota places (one per gender) for the Olympic through the release of the final Olympic mountain biking rankings. The Czech Cycling Union selected Ondřej Cink and Adéla Holubová to the team, despite the objections of other female rider Jitka Čábelická.

| Athlete | Event | Time | Rank |
|---|---|---|---|
| Ondřej Cink | Men's cross-country | 1:32:28 | 25 |
| Adéla Holubová | Women's cross-country | LAP (2 laps) | 31 |

=== BMX ===
Freestyle

To qualify for the BMX freestyle Olympic competition, Iveta Miculyčová participated in the first of the Olympic Qualifier Series events in Shanghai, however before the second one she got injured and decided not to continue in the second qualifier in Budapest. The results however fulfilled the Miculyčová's team's expectations that she would qualify anyway thanks to her bronze-medal finish at the 2022 world championships.

| Athlete | Event | Seeding | | Final | |
| Athlete | Event | Points | Rank | Points | Rank |
|---|---|---|---|---|---|
| Iveta Miculyčová | Women's freestyle | 84.46 | 3 | 82.30 | 6 |

== Equestrian ==
=== Eventing ===
Czech Republic received first place from the regional world ranking, then in realocation of unused places, the second quota was added. The Czech Equestrian Federation named Miroslav Trunda with Shutterflyke, Miloslav Příhoda with Ferreolus Lat and Jaroslav Abík with Madock to the Olympic team, one of them will serve as the substitute rider. Trunda's Trnka-Ruf was added as a substitute horse.

| Athlete | Horse | Event | Dressage | | Cross-country | | | Jumping | | | | | | Total | |
| Athlete | Horse | Event | Dressage | | Cross-country | | | Qualifier | | | Final | | | Total | |
| Athlete | Horse | Event | Penalties | Rank | Penalties | Total | Rank | Penalties | Total | Rank | Penalties | Total | Rank | Penalties | Rank |
|---|---|---|---|---|---|---|---|---|---|---|---|---|---|---|---|
| Miroslav Trunda | Shutterflyke | Individual | 53.00 | 63 | 72.00 | 125.00 | 56 | 30.00 | 155.00 | 50 | Did not advance | | | | |
| Miloslav Příhoda | Ferreolus Lat | Individual | 35.70 | 45 | Eliminated | | | Did not advance | | | | | | | |

== Fencing ==
The Czech Republic entered 5 fencers. Jiří Beran ended his active sport career after the bronze match.

| Athlete | Event | Round of 64 | Round of 32 | Round of 16 | Quarterfinal | Semifinal | Final / BM | |
| Athlete | Event | Opposition Score | Opposition Score | Opposition Score | Opposition Score | Opposition Score | Opposition Score | Rank |
|---|---|---|---|---|---|---|---|---|
| Jiří Beran | Men's épée | Bye | Cannone (FRA); L 8–15 | Did not advance | | | | 29 |
| Jakub Jurka | Men's épée | Mohsen (EGY); W 15–8 | Siklósi (HUN); L 5–15 | Did not advance | | | | 32 |
| Martin Rubeš | Men's épée | Bye | Di Veroli (ITA); L 10–14 | Did not advance | | | | 28 |
| Jiří Beran; Jakub Jurka; Martin Rubeš; *Michal Čupr | Men's team épée | —N/a | | | Italy; W 43–38 | Japan; L 37–45 | France; W 43–41 | 3rd place, bronze medalist(s) |
| Alexander Choupenitch | Men's foil | Bye | Siess (POL); W 15–3 | Bianchi (ITA); L 5–15 | Did not advance | | | 12 |

== Golf ==
Czech Republic entered two female golfers into the Olympic tournament.

| Athlete | Event | Round 1 | Round 2 | Round 3 | Round 4 | Total | | |
| Athlete | Event | Score | Score | Score | Score | Score | Par | Rank |
|---|---|---|---|---|---|---|---|---|
| Klára Spilková | Women's | 77 | 73 | 70 | 76 | 296 | +8 | 41 |
| Sára Kousková | Women's | 73 | 77 | 79 | 77 | 306 | +18 | T55 |

== Gymnastics ==
=== Artistic ===
Czech Republic entered one female gymnast into the games. Soňa Artamonová qualified for the games by virtue of her individual results, through an all-round event at the 2023 World Artistic Gymnastics Championships in Antwerp, Belgium.

Women

| Athlete | Event | Qualification | | | | | | Final | | | | | |
| Athlete | Event | Apparatus | | | | Total | Rank | Apparatus | | | | Total | Rank |
| Athlete | Event | V | UB | BB | F | Total | Rank | V | UB | BB | F | Total | Rank |
|---|---|---|---|---|---|---|---|---|---|---|---|---|---|
| Soňa Artamonová | All-around | 13 | 12.333 | 12.966 | 12.3 | 50.599 | 46 | Did not advance | | | | | |

== Judo ==
Czech Republic entered two male and one female judoka into the Olympic tournament based on the International Judo Federation Olympics Individual Ranking.

| Athlete | Event | Round of 32 | Round of 16 | Quarterfinals | Semifinals | Repechage | Final / BM | |
| Athlete | Event | Opposition Result | Opposition Result | Opposition Result | Opposition Result | Opposition Result | Opposition Result | Rank |
|---|---|---|---|---|---|---|---|---|
| David Klammert | Men's −90 kg | Ngayap Hambou (FRA); L 00–10 | Did not advance | | | | | =17 |
| Lukáš Krpálek | Men's +100 kg | Snippe (NED); W 10–00 | Saito (JPN); L 00–10 | Did not advance | | | | =9 |
| Renata Zachová | Women's −63 kg | Özbas (HUN); L 00–01 | Did not advance | | | | | =17 |

== Modern pentathlon ==
Czech modern pentathletes confirmed three quota places for Paris 2024. Lucie Hlaváčková secured her selection in the women's event by finishing eighteenth in the overall point rankings and eighth among those eligible for Olympic qualification at the 2023 European Games in Kraków, Poland. Later on, three more athletes qualified for the games through the release of final Olympic ranking, the Czech modern pentathlon union naming Martin Vlach, Marek Grycz and Veronika Novotná to the team.

Key

- Note–Ranks given for events are within the athlete's heat only
- F = Qualified for final

| Athlete | Event | Fencing ranking round (Épée one touch) | | | Semifinal | | | | | | | | | | | | | Final | | | | | | | | | | | | |
| Athlete | Event | Fencing ranking round (Épée one touch) | | | Riding (Show jumping) | | | | Fencing | Swimming (200 m freestyle) | | | Shooting / Running (10 m laser pistol / 3000 m cross-country) | | | Total | | Riding (Show jumping) | | | | Fencing | Swimming | | | Shooting / Running | | | Total | |
| Athlete | Event | V–D | Rank | Points | Time | Penalties | Rank | Points | BP | Time | Rank | Points | Time | Rank | Points | Points | Rank | Time | Penalties | Rank | Points | BP | Time | Rank | Points | Time | Rank | Points | Points | Rank |
|---|---|---|---|---|---|---|---|---|---|---|---|---|---|---|---|---|---|---|---|---|---|---|---|---|---|---|---|---|---|---|
| Martin Vlach | Men's | 12–23 | 32 | 185 | 60.29 | 0 | 3 | 300 | 2 | 2:07.93 | 16 | 295 | 9:47.46 | 1 | 713 OR | 1495 | 10 | Did not advance | | | | | | | | | | | | |
| Marek Grycz | Men's | 10–25 | 34 | 175 | 59.73 | 14 | 12 | 286 | 0 | 2:00.60 | 6 | 309 | 10:16.03 | 8 | 684 | 1454 | 14 | Did not advance | | | | | | | | | | | | |
| Lucie Hlaváčková | Women's | 16–19 | 22 | 205 | 62.24 | 0 | 1 | 300 | 2 | 2:19.46 | 11 | 272 | 11:24.77 | 4 | 616 | 1395 | 6 F | 59.85 | 7 | 11 | 293 | 4 | 2:20.54 | 13 | 269 | 11:08.44 | 6 | 632 | 1403 | 10 |
| Veronika Novotná | Women's | 22–13 | 4 | 235 | 57.70 | 7 | 12 | 293 | 2 | 2:20.97 | 13 | 269 | 13:03.98 | 18 | 517 | 1316 | 14 | Did not advance | | | | | | | | | | | | |

== Rowing ==
Czech rowers qualified boats in each of the following events through the 2023 World Rowing Championships in Belgrade, Serbia and 2024 Final Qualification Regatta in Lucerne, Switzerland.

| Athlete | Event | Heats | | Repechage | | Semifinals | | Final | |
| Athlete | Event | Time | Rank | Time | Rank | Time | Rank | Time | Rank |
|---|---|---|---|---|---|---|---|---|---|
| Jiří Šimánek; Miroslav Vraštil | Men's lightweight double sculls | 6:34.33 | 2 SA/B | Bye | | 6:25.99 | 3 FA | 6:21.00 | 6 |
| Lenka Lukšová; Anna Šantrůčková | Women's double sculls | 6:55.16 | 2 SA/B | Bye | | 6:54.76 | 4 FB | 6:49.92 | 8 |
| Pavlína Flamíková; Radka Novotníková | Women's coxless pair | 7:28.23 | 3 SA/B | Bye | | 7:33.68 | 6 FB | 7:10.46 | 10 |

Qualification Legend: FA=Final A (medal); FB=Final B (non-medal); FC=Final C (non-medal); FD=Final D (non-medal); FE=Final E (non-medal); FF=Final F (non-medal); SA/B=Semifinals A/B; SC/D=Semifinals C/D; SE/F=Semifinals E/F; QF=Quarterfinals; R=Repechage

== Sailing ==
Czech Republic entered three female sailors into the games.

Elimination events

| Athlete | Event | Race | | | | | | | | | | | | | | | | | | | | Net points | Rank | Race | | | Final rank |
| Athlete | Event | 1 | 2 | 3 | 4 | 5 | 6 | 7 | 8 | 9 | 10 | 11 | 12 | 13 | 14 | 15 | 16 | 17 | 18 | 19 | 20 | Net points | Rank | QF | SF | F | Final rank |
|---|---|---|---|---|---|---|---|---|---|---|---|---|---|---|---|---|---|---|---|---|---|---|---|---|---|---|---|
| Kateřina Švíková | Women's IQFoil | 8 | 8 | ~~18~~ | 10 | 6 | 7 | 13 | 3 | 14 | 8 | 15 | 5 | ~~19~~ | 4 | Cancelled | | | | | | 101 | 5 QF | 7 | Did not advance | | 9 |

Medal race events

| Athlete | Event | Race | | | | | | | | | | | | | | | | Net points | Final rank |
| Athlete | Event | 1 | 2 | 3 | 4 | 5 | 6 | 7 | 8 | 9 | 10 | 11 | 12 | 13 | 14 | 15 | M* | Net points | Final rank |
|---|---|---|---|---|---|---|---|---|---|---|---|---|---|---|---|---|---|---|---|
| Zosia Burska; Sára Tkadlecová | Women's 49erFX | 11 | 13 | 7 | 2 | ~~20~~ | 15 | 16 | 19 | 18 | 19 | 18 | 16 | —N/a | | | EL | 154 | 19 |

M = Medal race; EL = Eliminated – did not advance into the medal race

== Shooting ==
Czech shooters achieved quota places for the following events based on their results at the 2022 and 2023 ISSF World Championships, 2022, 2023, and 2024 European Championships, 2023 European Games, and 2024 ISSF World Olympic Qualification Tournament.

Men

| Athlete | Event | Qualification | | Final | |
| Athlete | Event | Points | Rank | Points | Rank |
|---|---|---|---|---|---|
| Jiří Přívratský | 10 m air rifle | 627.8 | 23 | Did not advance | |
| František Smetana | 10 m air rifle | 625.5 | 38 | Did not advance | |
| Jiří Přívratský | 50 m rifle 3 positions | 590-35x | 8 Q | 440.7 | 4 |
| Petr Nymburský | 50 m rifle 3 positions | 590-32x | 9 | Did not advance | |
| Matěj Rampula | 10 m air pistol | 571 | 23 | Did not advance | |
| Martin Podhráský | 25 m rapid fire pistol | 573-11x | 27 | Did not advance | |
| Matěj Rampula | 25 m rapid fire pistol | 581-22x | 14 | Did not advance | |
| Jiří Lipták | Trap | 119 | 18 | Did not advance | |
| Jakub Tomeček | Skeet | 121 | 12 | Did not advance | |

Women

| Athlete | Event | Qualification | | Final | |
| Athlete | Event | Points | Rank | Points | Rank |
|---|---|---|---|---|---|
| Veronika Blažíčková | 10 m air rifle | 625.1 | 34 | Did not advance | |
| Veronika Blažíčková | 50 m rifle 3 positions | 584-32x | 16 | Did not advance | |
| Barbora Šumová | Skeet | 114 | 22 | Did not advance | |

Mixed

| Athlete | Event | Qualification | | Final / BM | |
| Athlete | Event | Points | Rank | Points | Rank |
|---|---|---|---|---|---|
| Jiří Přívratský; Veronika Blažíčková | 10 m air rifle team | 623.6 | 24 | Did not advance | |
| Jakub Tomeček; Barbora Šumová | Skeet team | 143 | 8 | Did not advance | |

== Sport climbing ==
Czechia qualified one climber for Paris. Adam Ondra qualified for the games after finishing as one of top ten climbers in the boulder and lead category at the 2024 Olympic Qualifier Series.

Boulder & lead combined

| Athlete | Event | Qualification | | | | | | Final | | | | | |
| Athlete | Event | Boulder | | Lead | | Total | Rank | Boulder | | Lead | | Total | Rank |
| Athlete | Event | Result | Place | Result | Place | Total | Rank | Result | Place | Result | Time | Total | Rank |
|---|---|---|---|---|---|---|---|---|---|---|---|---|---|
| Adam Ondra | Men's | 48.7 | 5 | 68.1 | 2 | 116.8 | 3 Q | 24.1 | 7 | 96.0 | 1 | 120.1 | 6 |

== Swimming ==
Czech swimmers achieved the entry standards in the following events (a maximum of two swimmers under the Olympic Qualifying Time (OST) and potentially at the Olympic Consideration Time (OCT)).

| Athlete | Event | Heat | | Semifinal | | Final | |
| Athlete | Event | Time | Rank | Time | Rank | Time | Rank |
|---|---|---|---|---|---|---|---|
| Miroslav Knedla | Men's 100 m backstroke | 53.41 | 10 Q | 53.44 | 12 | Did not advance | |
| Daniel Gracík | Men's 100 m freestyle | 49.65 | 39 | Did not advance | | | |
| Daniel Gracík | Men's 100 m butterfly | 52.61 | 27 | Did not advance | | | |
| Martin Straka | 10 km open water | —N/a | | | | 1:57:52.9 | 20 |
| Barbora Seemanová | Women's 100 m freestyle | 54.66 | 17 Q | 53.94 | 13 | Did not advance | |
| Barbora Seemanová | Women's 200 m freestyle | 1:57.02 | 10 Q | 1:56.06 | 6 Q | 1:55.47 | 6 |
| Barbora Seemanová | Women's 100 m butterfly | 57.50 | 9 Q | 57.64 | 12 | Did not advance | |
| Barbora Seemanová | Women's 200 m individual medley | 2:13.47 | 22 | Did not advance | | | |
| Kristýna Horská | Women's 100 m breaststroke | 1:08.96 | 28 | Did not advance | | | |
| Kristýna Horská | Women's 200 m breaststroke | 2:26.28 | 16 Q | 2:25.77 | 15 | Did not advance | |

== Table tennis ==
Czech Republic entered one table tennis player into Paris 2024. Hana Matelová qualified for the games by virtue of nominated into the top twelve ranked players, in the women's single class, through the release of the final world ranking for Paris 2024.

| Athlete | Event | Preliminary | Round of 64 | Round of 32 | Round of 16 | Quarterfinals | Semifinals | Final / BM | |
| Athlete | Event | Opposition Result | Opposition Result | Opposition Result | Opposition Result | Opposition Result | Opposition Result | Opposition Result | Rank |
|---|---|---|---|---|---|---|---|---|---|
| Hana Matelová | Women's singles | Bye | Yang (MON); W 4–2 | Eerland (NED); L 3–4 | Did not advance | | | | =17 |

== Taekwondo ==
Czech Republic qualified two athletes to compete at the games. Petra Štolbová secured her spot through winning the semifinal round in her own division at the 2024 European Taekwondo Olympic Qualification Tournament, in Sofia, Bulgaria. Later on, Dominika Hronová qualified for the games, after the IOC announced the Individual Neutral Athletes taekwondo squad as ineligible, so Dominika got the re-allocations.

| Athlete | Event | Qualification | Round of 16 | Quarterfinals | Semifinals | Repechage | Final / BM | |
| Athlete | Event | Opposition Result | Opposition Result | Opposition Result | Opposition Result | Opposition Result | Opposition Result | Rank |
|---|---|---|---|---|---|---|---|---|
| Dominika Hronová | Women's –57 kg | —N/a | Park (CAN); L 0–2 (2–6, 3–4) | Did not advance | | | | =11 |
| Petra Štolbová | Women's +67 kg | —N/a | Lee (KOR); L 0–2 (4–4, 2–3) | Did not advance | | | | =11 |

== Tennis ==
In the men's singles, Jiří Lehečka was eligible to be selected to represent Czechia in Paris, but he had to withdraw from the team due to injury. In the women|s singles and doubles, Markéta Vondroušová withdrew from the competition due to hand injury. She was replaced by Kateřina Siniaková in singles and by Linda Nosková in doubles.

Men

| Athlete | Event | Round of 64 | Round of 32 | Round of 16 | Quarterfinals | Semifinals | Final / BM | |
| Athlete | Event | Opposition Score | Opposition Score | Opposition Score | Opposition Score | Opposition Score | Opposition Score | Rank |
|---|---|---|---|---|---|---|---|---|
| Tomáš Macháč | Singles | Zhang (CHN); W 6–2, 4–6, 6–2 | Zverev (GER); L 3–6, 5–7 | Did not advance | | | | |
| Jakub Menšík | Singles | Shevchenko (KAZ); W 6–3, 6–4 | Paul (USA); L 3–6, 1–6 | Did not advance | | | | |
| Tomáš Macháč; Adam Pavlásek | Doubles | —N/a | Salisbury / Skupski (GBR); W 6–4, 3–6, [10–8] | Jarry / Tabilo (CHI); W 5–7, 7–6^{(8–6)}, [10–4] | Krawietz / Pütz (GER); W 3–6, 6–1, [10–5] | Krajicek / Ram (USA); L 2–6, 2–6 | Fritz / Paul (USA); L 3–6, 4–6 | 4 |

Women

| Athlete | Event | Round of 64 | Round of 32 | Round of 16 | Quarterfinals | Semifinals | Final / BM | |
| Athlete | Event | Opposition Score | Opposition Score | Opposition Score | Opposition Score | Opposition Score | Opposition Score | Rank |
|---|---|---|---|---|---|---|---|---|
| Karolína Muchová | Singles | Fernandez (CAN); L 1–6, 6–4, 2–6 | Did not advance | | | | | |
| Barbora Krejčíková | Singles | Sorribes Tormo (ESP); W 4–6, 6–0, 7–6^{(7–3)} | Xin Wang (CHN); W 6–2, 6–3 | Svitolina (UKR); W 7–6^{(7–5)}, 2–6, 6–4 | Schmiedlová (SVK); L 4–6, 2–6 | Did not advance | | |
| Linda Nosková | Singles | Xiy Wang (CHN); L 3–6, 3–6 | Did not advance | | | | | |
| Kateřina Siniaková | Singles | Burel (FRA); L 6–7^{(3–7)}, 4–6 | Did not advance | | | | | |
| Barbora Krejčíková; Kateřina Siniaková | Doubles | —N/a | H-c Chan / L Chan (TPE); W 6–4, 6–0 | Aoyama / Shibahara (JPN); W 7–5, 6–4 | Andreeva / Shnaider (AIN); L 1–6, 5–7 | Did not advance | | |
| Karolína Muchová; Linda Nosková | Doubles | —N/a | Alexandrova / Vesnina (AIN); W 2–6, 7–6^{(7–5)}, [10–6] | Gauff / Pegula (USA); W 2–6, 6–4, [10–5] | Hsieh / Tsao (TPE); W 1–6, 6–4, [14–12] | Errani / Paolini (ITA); L 3–6, 2–6 | Bucșa / Sorribes Tormo (ESP); L 2–6, 2–6 | 4 |

Mixed

| Athlete | Event | Round of 16 | Quarterfinals | Semifinals | Final / BM | |
| Athlete | Event | Opposition Score | Opposition Score | Opposition Score | Opposition Score | Rank |
|---|---|---|---|---|---|---|
| Kateřina Siniaková; Tomáš Macháč | Mixed Doubles | Siegemund / Zverev (GER); W 6–4, 7–5 | Shibahara / Nishikori (JPN); W 7–5, 6–2 | Dabrowski / Auger-Aliassime (CAN); W 6–3, 6–3 | Xin Wang / Zhang (CHN); W 6–2, 5–7, [10–8] | 1st place, gold medalist(s) |

== Triathlon ==
Czech Republic entered one female triathlete in the triathlon events for Paris, following the release of final individual olympics qualification ranking.

Individual

| Athlete | Event | Time | | | | | | Rank |
| Athlete | Event | Swim (1.5 km) | Trans 1 | Bike (40 km) | Trans 2 | Run (10 km) | Total | Rank |
|---|---|---|---|---|---|---|---|---|
| Petra Kuříková | Women's | 24:02 | 0:57 | 1:00:40 | 0:30 | 34:53 | 2:01:02 | 29 |

== Volleyball ==
=== Beach ===
Czech Republic qualified a total of 4 athletes in beach volleyball. Ondřej Perušič and David Schweiner qualified for Paris by winning the gold medal and securing an outright berth at the 2023 FIVB World Championships in Tlaxcala, Mexico. Later on, a women's pair qualified through received a forfeited quota from the Netherlands.

| Athletes | Event | Preliminary round | | | | Lucky Loser | Round of 16 | Quarterfinals | Semifinals | Finals | Rank |
| Athletes | Event | Opposition Score | Opposition Score | Opposition Score | Rank | Opposition Score | Opposition Score | Opposition Score | Opposition Score | Opposition Score | Rank |
|---|---|---|---|---|---|---|---|---|---|---|---|
| Ondřej Perušič; David Schweiner | Men's | Schachter / Dearing (CAN); W 2–0 (21–17, 21–19) | Hörl / Horst (AUT); W 2–0 (21–18, 21–13) | Evandro / Arthur (BRA); L 2–0 (18–21, 16–21) | 2 | Bye | Boermans / de Groot (NED); L 18–21, 16–21 | Did not advance | | | =9 |
| Barbora Hermannová; Marie-Sára Štochlová | Women's | Hughes / Cheng (USA); L 0–2 (16–21, 11–21) | Müller / Tillmann (GER); L 0–2 (17–21, 9–21) | Vieira / Chamereau (FRA); W 2–1 (21–13, 18–21, 15–9) | 3 | Melissa / Brandie (CAN); L 0–2 (15–21, 12–21) | Did not advance | | | | =17 |

== Weightlifting ==
Czech Republic weightlifters qualified one quota places at the games based on the IWF Olympics ranking. At first, Kamil Kučera was left behind the qualifiers, however as the IOC disapproved the qualification of several weightlifters from Russia and Belarus, Kučera moved into the quota.

| Athlete | Event | Snatch | | Clean & Jerk | | Total | Rank |
| Athlete | Event | Result | Rank | Result | Rank | Total | Rank |
|---|---|---|---|---|---|---|---|
| Kamil Kučera | Men's +102 kg | 110 | 11 | 140 | 11 | 250 | 11 |

== See also ==
- Czech Republic at the Olympics
- Czech Republic at the Paralympics
- Czech Republic at the 2024 Summer Paralympics
- Czech Republic at the Youth Olympics
- Czech Republic at the 2024 Winter Youth Olympics
- Czech Republic at the FISU World University Games
- Czech Republic at the 2021 Summer World University Games
- Czech Republic at the 2023 Winter World University Games
