= Fencing at the 2024 Summer Olympics – Men's épée =

Men's épée at the Games of the XXXIII Olympiad
- Olympic fencing
- Venue: Grand Palais strip
- Date: 28 July 2024
- Competitors: 35 from 19 nations

Medalists
1st place, gold medalist(s)		Koki Kano	Japan
2nd place, silver medalist(s)		Yannick Borel	France
3rd place, bronze medalist(s)		Mohamed El-Sayed	Egypt

The men's épée event at the 2024 Summer Olympics took place on 28 July 2024 at the Grand Palais strip.

== Background ==
This was the 29th appearance of the event, which has been held at every Summer Olympics since being introduced in 1900.

Romain Cannone was the defending champion, but lost in the round of 16.

== Competition format ==
The 1996 tournament had vastly simplified the competition format into a single-elimination bracket, with a bronze medal match. The 2024 tournament continued to use that format. Fencing was done to 15 touches or to the completion of three three-minute rounds if neither fencer reaches 15 touches by then. At the end of time, the higher-scoring fencer was the winner; a tie resulted in an additional one-minute sudden-death time period. This sudden-death period was further modified by the selection of a draw-winner beforehand; if neither fencer scored a touch during the minute, the predetermined draw-winner won the bout. Standard épée rules regarding target area, striking, and priority were used.

== Schedule ==
The competition was held over a single day, Sunday, 28 July. Women's épée bouts alternate with the men's sabre event bouts.

All times use Central European Summer Time (UTC+2)

Date	Time	Round
Sunday, 28 July 2024	10:00; 12:25; 15:05; 16:25; 20:00; 22:15	Round of 64; Round of 32; Round of 16; Quarterfinals; Semifinals; Finals

== Results ==
=== Finals ===
Semifinals
Tibor Andrásfi (HUN)	13
Koki Kano (JPN)	14
Yannick Borel (FRA)	15
Mohamed El-Sayed (EGY)	9

Final
Koki Kano (JPN)	15
Yannick Borel (FRA)	9
Bronze medal bout
Tibor Andrásfi (HUN)	7
Mohamed El-Sayed (EGY)	8

=== Top half ===
==== Section 1 ====
Round of 64
Nicholas Zhang (CAN)	11
Grabiel Lugo (VEN)	15

Round of 32
Máté Tamás Koch (HUN)	10
Grabiel Lugo (VEN)	15
Rubén Limardo (VEN)	10
Tibor Andrásfi (HUN)	15
Federico Vismara (ITA)	15
Tristan Tulen (NED)	11
Elmir Alimzhanov (KAZ)	15
Luidgi Midelton (FRA)	14

Round of 16
Grabiel Lugo (VEN)	12
Tibor Andrásfi (HUN)	13
Federico Vismara (ITA)	14
Elmir Alimzhanov (KAZ)	13

Quarterfinals
Tibor Andrásfi (HUN)	15
Federico Vismara (ITA)	13

==== Section 2 ====
Round of 64

Round of 32
Romain Cannone (FRA)	15
Jiří Beran (CZE)	8
Houssam El Kord (MAR)	13
Ruslan Kurbanov (KAZ)	15
Wang Zijie (CHN)	15
Francisco Limardo (VEN)	12
Kim Jae-won (KOR)	12
Koki Kano (JPN)	14

Round of 16
Romain Cannone (FRA)	10
Ruslan Kurbanov (KAZ)	15
Wang Zijie (CHN)	4
Koki Kano (JPN)	15

Quarterfinals
Ruslan Kurbanov (KAZ)	6
Koki Kano (JPN)	15

=== Bottom half ===
==== Section 3 ====
Round of 64
Harry Saner (RSA)	9
Vadim Sharlaimov (KAZ)	15

Round of 32
Yannick Borel (FRA)	15
Vadim Sharlaimov (KAZ)	13
Mohammed Yasseen (EGY)	8
Kazuyasu Minobe (JPN)	9
Masaru Yamada (JPN)	15
Ho Wai Hang (HKG)	9
Martin Rubeš (CZE)	10
Davide Di Veroli (ITA)	14

Round of 16
Yannick Borel (FRA)	15
Kazuyasu Minobe (JPN)	11
Masaru Yamada (JPN)	15
Davide Di Veroli (ITA)	11

Quarterfinals
Yannick Borel (FRA)	12
Masaru Yamada (JPN)	11

==== Section 4 ====
Round of 64
Mohamed Mohsen (EGY)	8
Jakub Jurka (CZE)	15

Round of 32
Yuval Freilich (ISR)	13
Andrea Santarelli (ITA)	15
Jhon Édison Rodríguez (COL)	7
Mohamed El-Sayed (EGY)	15
Alexis Bayard (SUI)	9
Neisser Loyola (BEL)	15
Jakub Jurka (CZE)	5
Gergely Siklósi (HUN)	15

Round of 16
Andrea Santarelli (ITA)	10
Mohamed El-Sayed (EGY)	15
Neisser Loyola (BEL)	14
Gergely Siklósi (HUN)	13

Quarterfinals
Mohamed El-Sayed (EGY)	9
Neisser Loyola (BEL)	8
