= Venezuela at the 2024 Summer Olympics =

- IOC code: VEN
- NOC: Venezuelan Olympic Committee
- Website: cov.com.ve (in Spanish)

in Paris, France 26 July 2024 – 11 August 2024
- Competitors: 32 (18 men and 14 women) in 11 sports
- Flag bearers (opening): Julio Mayora & Anriquelis Barrios
- Flag bearers (closing): Julio Mayora & Anyelin Venegas
- Medals: Gold 0 Silver 0 Bronze 0 Total 0

Summer Olympics appearances (overview)
- 1948; 1952; 1956; 1960; 1964; 1968; 1972; 1976; 1980; 1984; 1988; 1992; 1996; 2000; 2004; 2008; 2012; 2016; 2020; 2024

Venezuela competed at the 2024 Summer Olympics in Paris from 26 July to 11 August 2024. It was the nation's twentieth consecutive appearance at the Summer Olympics. Venezuela failed to win a single Olympic medal for the first time since the 2000 Summer Olympics. Raiber Rodríguez fell short of his bronze medal match in the men's Greco-Roman wrestling 60 kg, losing out to Ri Se-ung of North Korea.

== Competitors ==
The following is the list of number of competitors in the Games.

| Sport | Men | Women | Total |
|---|---|---|---|
| Athletics | 2 | 4 | 6 |
| Boxing | 1 | 1 | 2 |
| Cycling | 1 | 0 | 1 |
| Equestrian | 1 | 1 | 2 |
| Fencing | 4 | 1 | 5 |
| Judo | 0 | 1 | 1 |
| Shooting | 2 | 0 | 2 |
| Swimming | 2 | 1 | 3 |
| Taekwondo | 1 | 0 | 1 |
| Weightlifting | 2 | 3 | 5 |
| Wrestling | 2 | 2 | 4 |
| Total | 18 | 14 | 32 |

== Athletics ==
Venezuelan track and field athletes achieved the entry standards for Paris 2024, either by passing the direct qualifying mark (or time for track and road races) or by world ranking, in the following events (a maximum of 3 athletes each):

Key

- Note–Ranks given for track events are within the athlete's heat only
- Q = Qualified for the next round
- q = Qualified for the next round as a fastest loser or, in field events, by position without achieving the qualifying target
- NR = National record
- N/A = Round not applicable for the event
- Bye = Athlete not required to compete in round

Track and road events

| Athlete | Event | Heat | | Repechage | | Semifinal | | Final | |
| Athlete | Event | Result | Rank | Result | Rank | Result | Rank | Result | Rank |
|---|---|---|---|---|---|---|---|---|---|
| José Antonio Maita | Men's 800 m | 1:48.02 | 8 | 1:46.44 | 3 | Did not advance | | | |
| Joselyn Brea | Women's 1500 m | 4:13.17 | 15 | 4:05.93 | 6 | Did not advance | | | |
| Joselyn Brea | Women's 5000 m | 15:02.89 | 8 Q | —N/a | | | | 15:17.04 | 15 |
| Yoveinny Mota | Women's 100 m hurdles | DSQ | | Did not advance | | | | | |

Field events

| Athlete | Event | Qualification | | Final | |
| Athlete | Event | Result | Rank | Result | Rank |
|---|---|---|---|---|---|
| Leodan Torrealba | Men's triple jump | 16.18 | 29 | Did not advance | |
| Robeilys Peinado | Women's pole vault | 4.40 | =12 q | 4.60 SB | 10 |
| Rosa Rodríguez | Women's hammer throw | 71.76 | 10 q | 72.98 SB | 8 |

== Boxing ==
Venezuela entered two boxers into the Olympic tournament. Omailyn Alcalá qualified herself to Paris in featherweight division by advancing to the semifinals round at the 2023 Pan American Games in Santiago, Chile. Meanwhile, Jesús Cova assured an olympic quota through the 2024 World Olympic Qualification Tournament 1 in Busto Arsizio, Italy.

| Athlete | Event | Round of 32 | Round of 16 | Quarterfinals | Semifinals | Final | |
| Athlete | Event | Opposition Result | Opposition Result | Opposition Result | Opposition Result | Opposition Result | Rank |
|---|---|---|---|---|---|---|---|
| Jesús Cova | Men's 63.5 kg | Bye | Sinsiri (THA); L 0–5 | Did not advance | | | |
| Omailyn Alcalá | Women's 57 kg | Szeremeta (POL); L 1–4 | Did not advance | | | | |

== Cycling ==
=== Road ===
Venezuela entered one male rider to compete in the men's road race events at the Olympic, after secured those quota through the UCI Nation Ranking.

| Athlete | Event | Time | Rank |
|---|---|---|---|
| Orluis Aular | Men's road race | 6:26:57 | 53 |

== Equestrian ==
Venezuela entered one riders in the individual jumping event, through the establishments of final olympics ranking for Groups D and E (Americas).

=== Dressage ===
| Athlete | Horse | Event | Grand Prix | | Grand Prix Special | | Grand Prix Freestyle | | Overall | |
| Athlete | Horse | Event | Score | Rank | Score | Rank | Technical | Artistic | Score | Rank |
|---|---|---|---|---|---|---|---|---|---|---|
| Patricia Ferrando | Honnaisseur SJ | Individual | 67.143 | 46 | —N/a | | Did not advance | | | |

Qualification Legend: Q = Qualified for the final based on position in group; q = Qualified for the final based on overall position

=== Jumping ===
| Athlete | Horse | Event | Qualification | | Final | | |
| Athlete | Horse | Event | Penalties | Rank | Penalties | Time | Rank |
|---|---|---|---|---|---|---|---|
| Luis Fernando Larrázabal | Condara | Individual | 20 | 63 | Did not advance | | |

== Fencing ==
Venezuela entered one female and four male fencers into the Olympic competition. Men's épée team secured quota places after nominated as the highest ranked nations team, eligible for Pan American zone through the release of the FIE Official ranking for Paris 2024, while Katherine Paredes secured her olympic spot through the Zonal Panamerican Olympic Qualifier Tournament 2024, held in San José, Costa Rica.

| Athlete | Event | Round of 64 | Round of 32 | Round of 16 | Quarterfinal | Semifinal | Final / BM | |
| Athlete | Event | Opposition Score | Opposition Score | Opposition Score | Opposition Score | Opposition Score | Opposition Score | Rank |
|---|---|---|---|---|---|---|---|---|
| Francisco Limardo | Men's épée | Bye | Wang (CHN); L 12–15 | Did not advance | | | | |
| Rubén Limardo | Men's épée | Bye | Andrásfi (HUN); L 10–15 | Did not advance | | | | |
| Grabiel Lugo | Men's épée | Zhang (CAN); W 15–11 | Koch (HUN); W 15–10 | Andrásfi (HUN); L 12–13 | Did not advance | | | |
| Francisco Limardo; Rubén Limardo; Jesús Limardo; Grabiel Lugo | Men's team épée | —N/a | | | Japan; L 33–39 | Classification semifinal Italy; L 34–45 | Seventh place final Egypt; W 41–35 | 7 |
| Khaterine Paredes | Women's sabre | Márton (HUN); L 10–15 | Did not advance | | | | | |

== Judo ==
Venezuela qualified one judoka for the following weight class at the Games. Anriquelis Barrios (women's half-middleweight, 63 kg) got qualified via continental quota based on Olympic point rankings.

| Athlete | Event | Round of 64 | Round of 32 | Round of 16 | Quarterfinals | Semifinals | Repechage | Final / BM | |
| Athlete | Event | Opposition Result | Opposition Result | Opposition Result | Opposition Result | Opposition Result | Opposition Result | Opposition Result | Rank |
|---|---|---|---|---|---|---|---|---|---|
| Anriquelis Barrios | Women's –63 kg | —N/a | Belkadi (ALG); L 00–01 | Did not advance | | | | | |

== Shooting ==
Venezuelan shooters achieved quota places for the following events based on their results at the 2022 and 2023 ISSF World Championships, 2022 and 2024 Championships of the Americas, 2023 Pan American Games, and 2024 ISSF World Olympic Qualification Tournament.

| Athlete | Event | Qualification | | Semifinal | | Final | |
| Athlete | Event | Points | Rank | Points | Rank | Points | Rank |
|---|---|---|---|---|---|---|---|
| Douglas Gómez | Men's 25 m rapid fire pistol | 569 | 29 | Did not advance | | | |
| Leonel Martínez | Men's trap | 116 | 28 | Did not advance | | | |

== Swimming ==
Venezuelan swimmers achieved the entry standards in the following events for Paris 2024 (a maximum of two swimmers under the Olympic Qualifying Time (OST) and potentially at the Olympic Consideration Time (OCT)):

| Athlete | Event | Heat | | Semifinal | | Final | |
| Athlete | Event | Time | Rank | Time | Rank | Time | Rank |
|---|---|---|---|---|---|---|---|
| Alberto Mestre | Men's 50 m freestyle | 22.02 | 21 | Did not advance | | | |
| Alberto Mestre | Men's 100 m freestyle | 49.51 | 31 | Did not advance | | | |
| Alfonso Mestre | Men's 400 m freestyle | 3:48.20 | 19 | —N/a | | Did not advance | |
| Alfonso Mestre | Men's 800 m freestyle | 8:12.03 | 29 | —N/a | | Did not advance | |
| María Yegres | Women's 200 m freestyle | 2:00.66 | 20 | Did not advance | | | |

== Taekwondo ==
Venezuela qualified one athlete to compete at the 2024 Olympic Games. Yohandri Granado secured his spot by virtue of winning the semifinal match, through the 2024 Pan American Qualification Tournament, in Santo Domingo, Dominican Republic.

| Athlete | Event | Qualification | Round of 16 | Quarterfinals | Semifinals | Repechage | Final / BM | |
| Athlete | Event | Opposition Result | Opposition Result | Opposition Result | Opposition Result | Opposition Result | Opposition Result | Rank |
|---|---|---|---|---|---|---|---|---|
| Yohandri Granado | Men's –58 kg | Bye | Park T-j (KOR); L 0–12, 0–12 | —N/a | | Ravet (FRA); L 1–2, 2–6 | Did not advance | |

== Weightlifting ==
Venezuela entered five weightlifters into the Olympic competition. Katherin Echandia (women's 49 kg), Anyelin Venegas (women's 59 kg), Naryury Pérez (Women's +81 kg), Julio Mayora (Men's 73 kg) and Keydomar Vallenilla (Men's 89 kg) secured one of the top ten slots, each in their respective weight divisions based on the IWF Olympic Qualification Rankings.

| Athlete | Event | Snatch | | Clean & Jerk | | Total | Rank |
| Athlete | Event | Result | Rank | Result | Rank | Total | Rank |
|---|---|---|---|---|---|---|---|
| Katherin Echandia | Women's −49 kg | 83 | 9 | 105 | 9 | 188 | 9 |
| Anyelin Venegas | Women's −59 kg | 102 | 6 | 128 | 6 | 230 | 4 |
| Naryury Pérez | Women's +81 kg | 114 | 10 | 145 | 7 | 259 | 8 |
| Julio Mayora | Men's –73 kg | 152 | 5 | DNF | | | |
| Keydomar Vallenilla | Men's −89 kg | 162 | 10 | 196 | 8 | 358 | 8 |

== Wrestling ==
Venezuela qualified four wrestlers for Paris 2024. All of them qualified for the games following the triumph of advancing to the final round at 2024 Pan American Olympic Qualification Tournament in Acapulco, Mexico.

Key:

- VT (ranking points: 5–0 or 0–5) – Victory by fall.
- VB (ranking points: 5–0 or 0–5) – Victory by injury (VF for forfeit, VA for withdrawal or disqualification)
- PP (ranking points: 3–1 or 1–3) – Decision by points – the loser with technical points.
- PO (ranking points: 3–0 or 0–3) – Decision by points – the loser without technical points.
- ST (ranking points: 4–0 or 0–4) – Great superiority – the loser without technical points and a margin of victory of at least 8 (Greco-Roman) or 10 (freestyle) points.
- SP (ranking points: 4–1 or 1–4) – Technical superiority – the loser with technical points and a margin of victory of at least 8 (Greco-Roman) or 10 (freestyle) points.

Freestyle

| Athlete | Event | Round of 16 | Quarterfinals | Semifinals | Repechage | Final / BM | |
| Athlete | Event | Opposition Result | Opposition Result | Opposition Result | Opposition Result | Opposition Result | Rank |
|---|---|---|---|---|---|---|---|
| Anthony Montero | Men's −74 kg | Dake (USA); L 0–10 ^{ST} | Did not advance | | | | |
| Betzabeth Argüello | Women's −53 kg | Malmgren (SWE); L 0–5 ^{VT} | Did not advance | | | | |
| Soleymi Caraballo | Women's −68 kg | Ozaki (JPN); L 0–4 ^{ST} | Did not advance | | | | |

Greco-Roman

| Athlete | Event | Round of 16 | Quarterfinals | Semifinals | Repechage | Final / BM | |
| Athlete | Event | Opposition Result | Opposition Result | Opposition Result | Opposition Result | Opposition Result | Rank |
|---|---|---|---|---|---|---|---|
| Raiber Rodríguez | Men's −60 kg | Mammadov (AZE); W 3–1 ^{PP} | Cao (CHN); L 1–3 ^{PP} | Did not advance | Mohamed (EGY); W 4–1^{SP} | Bronze medal final Ri S-u (PRK); L 0–4 ^{ST} | 5 |
