= Dávid Nagy =

Dávid Nagy may refer to:

- Dávid Nagy (guitarist) (born 1981), Hungarian guitarist
- Dávid Nagy (fencer) (born 1999), Hungarian fencer
