= Fencing at the 2024 Summer Olympics – Men's team épée =

Men's team épée at the Games of the XXXIII Olympiad
- Olympic fencing
- Venue: Grand Palais strip
- Date: 2 August 2024
- Competitors: 32 from 8 nations
- Teams: 8

Medalists
1st place, gold medalist(s)		Máté Tamás Koch; Tibor Andrásfi; Gergely Siklósi; Dávid Nagy	Hungary
2nd place, silver medalist(s)		Akira Komata; Koki Kano; Masaru Yamada; Kazuyasu Minobe	Japan
3rd place, bronze medalist(s)		Jiří Beran; Jakub Jurka; Martin Rubeš; Michal Čupr	Czech Republic

The men's team épée event at the 2024 Summer Olympics took place on 2 August 2024 at the Grand Palais strip. 24 fencers (eight teams of three) from eight nations competed.

== Background ==
This will be the 26th appearance of the event, which has been held at every Summer Olympics since 1908 except 2012 (during the time when team events were rotated off the schedule, with only two of the three weapons for each of the men's and women's categories).

Japan (Koki Kano, Kazuyasu Minobe, Satoru Uyama and Masaru Yamada) were the defending champions, since Uyama was retired, Akira Komata took Uyama's spot, but lost to Hungary in the final.

== Qualification ==
A National Olympic Committee (NOC) could enter a team of three fencers in the men's team épée. These fencers also automatically qualified for the individual event.

== Competition format ==
The tournament was a single-elimination tournament, with classification matches for all places. Each match featured the three fencers on each team competing in a round-robin, with nine three-minute bouts to five points; the winning team was the one that reaches 45 total points first or was leading after the end of the nine bouts.

== Schedule ==
The competition was held over a single day.

All times are Central European Summer Time (UTC+2)

Date	Time	Round
Friday, 2 August 2024	14:20; 16:40; 17:30; 17:30; 19:30; 20:30	Quarterfinals; Semifinals; Classification 7/8; Classification 5/6; Bronze medal match Gold medal match

== Results ==
Quarter-finals
France	45
Egypt	39
Hungary	45
Kazakhstan	30
Japan	39
Venezuela	33
Czech Republic	43
Italy	38

Semi-finals
France	30
Hungary	45
Japan	45
Czech Republic	37

Final
Hungary	26
Japan	25
Bronze medal bout
France	41
Czech Republic	43

5–8th place classification

5–8th place semifinals
Egypt	21
Kazakhstan	36
Venezuela	34
Italy	45

Fifth place bout
Kazakhstan	36
Italy	45
Seventh place bout
Egypt	35
Venezuela	41

== Final classification ==
Rank	Team	Athletes
1st place, gold medalist(s)	Hungary	Máté Tamás Koch; Tibor Andrásfi; Gergely Siklósi; Dávid Nagy
2nd place, silver medalist(s)	Japan	Akira Komata; Koki Kano; Masaru Yamada; Kazuyasu Minobe
3rd place, bronze medalist(s)	Czech Republic	Jiří Beran; Jakub Jurka; Martin Rubeš; Michal Čupr
4	France	Paul Allègre; Luidgi Midelton; Yannick Borel; Romain Cannone
5	Italy	Andrea Santarelli; Davide Di Veroli; Gabriele Cimini; Federico Vismara
6	Kazakhstan	Ruslan Kurbanov; Yerlik Sertay; Elmir Alimzhanov; Vadim Sharlaimov
7	Venezuela	Jesús Limardo; Grabiel Lugo; Rubén Limardo; Francisco Limardo
8	Egypt	Mahmoud El-Sayed; Mohamed El-Sayed; Mohamed Yasseen; Mahmoud Mohsen
