= Neisser Loyola =

Belgian fencer (born 1998)

Personal information
- Born: 28 July 1998 (age 27) Cienfuegos, Cuba

Sport
- Sport: Fencing
Medal record
Men's fencing
Representing Belgium
World Championships
Bronze medal – third place	2022 Cairo	Individual Épée
European Championships
Bronze medal – third place	2026 Antony	Individual Épée

Neisser Loyola (born 28 July 1998) is a Belgian fencer from Cuban descent. He won a bronze medal in the individual Men's épée at the 2022 World Fencing Championships in Cairo, Egypt. His was only the 8th ever medal for a Belgian fencer since the first official World Fencing Championships in 1937 and the first since 1951.

Thanks to a silver medal at the 2023–24 Fencing World Cup leg in Tbilisi, Georgia in March 2024, he qualified for the individual men's épée at the 2024 Summer Olympics in Paris, France. At the Olympics, on his 26th birthday, he beat the world number one ranked Hungarian Gergely Siklósi in the 1/8 final but lost on a golden score in extra-time of the 1/4 final to the later bronze medal winner Mohamed El-Sayed.

He won a bronze medal in the individual men's épée at the 2026 European Fencing Championships in Antony, Hauts-de-Seine, France. It was Belgium's first medal at a European championship since 1981.

== Personal life ==
Neisser Loyola is the son of Cuban fencer Nelson Loyola Torriente, bronze medal winner for Cuba in the men's team épée event at the 2000 Summer Olympics and gold medal winner in the same discipline at the 1997 World Fencing Championships. The family moved to Belgium when Nelson Loyola was appointed national coach of the Belgian fencing team.
