= Tibor Andrásfi =

Hungarian fencer

Personal information
- Full name: Tibor Árpád Andrásfi
- Born: 10 December 1999 (age 26) Budapest, Hungary

Fencing career
- Sport: Fencing
- Country: Hungary
- Weapon: épée
- Hand: right-handed
- National coach: Tamas Dancshazy-Nagy
- Club: BVSC-Zugló
- FIE ranking: current ranking
Medal record
Men's épée
Representing Hungary
Olympic Gams
Gold medal – first place	2024 Paris	Team
World Championships
Silver medal – second place	2025 Tbilisi	Team
European Games
Gold medal – first place	2023 Kraków–Małopolska	Team
European Championships
Gold medal – first place	2023 Kraków	Team
Bronze medal – third place	2024 Basel	Individual
Junior World Championships
Gold medal – first place	2018 Verona	Team
Gold medal – first place	2019 Toruń	Team
Bronze medal – third place	2017 Plovdiv	Team

Tibor Árpád Andrásfi (born 10 December 1999) is a Hungarian épée fencer. He qualified for the 2024 Summer Olympics. He won the gold medal representing Hungary in Team Men's Épée. In individual competition, he reached the semifinals, but lost by a point to eventual gold medalist Koki Kano, and then lost in the bronze medal match by a point to Mohamed El-Sayed.

== Biography ==
He was born in 1999 in Budapest, Hungary, into a family of fencers. His father, Tibor Andrásfi Sr., started competing respresenting Romania before becoming a silver medalist in the Hungarian Fencing Championships. His mother, Lilla Muzsnay, also represented Romania at the 1991 World Fencing Championships in Budapest.

He took up fencing at the age of 9, coached by his father. His club is BVSC-Zugló.

== Medal record ==
=== Olympic Games ===
Year	Location	Event	Position
2024	Paris, France	Team Men's Épée	1st
