= Kazuyasu Minobe =

Japanese fencer (born 1987)

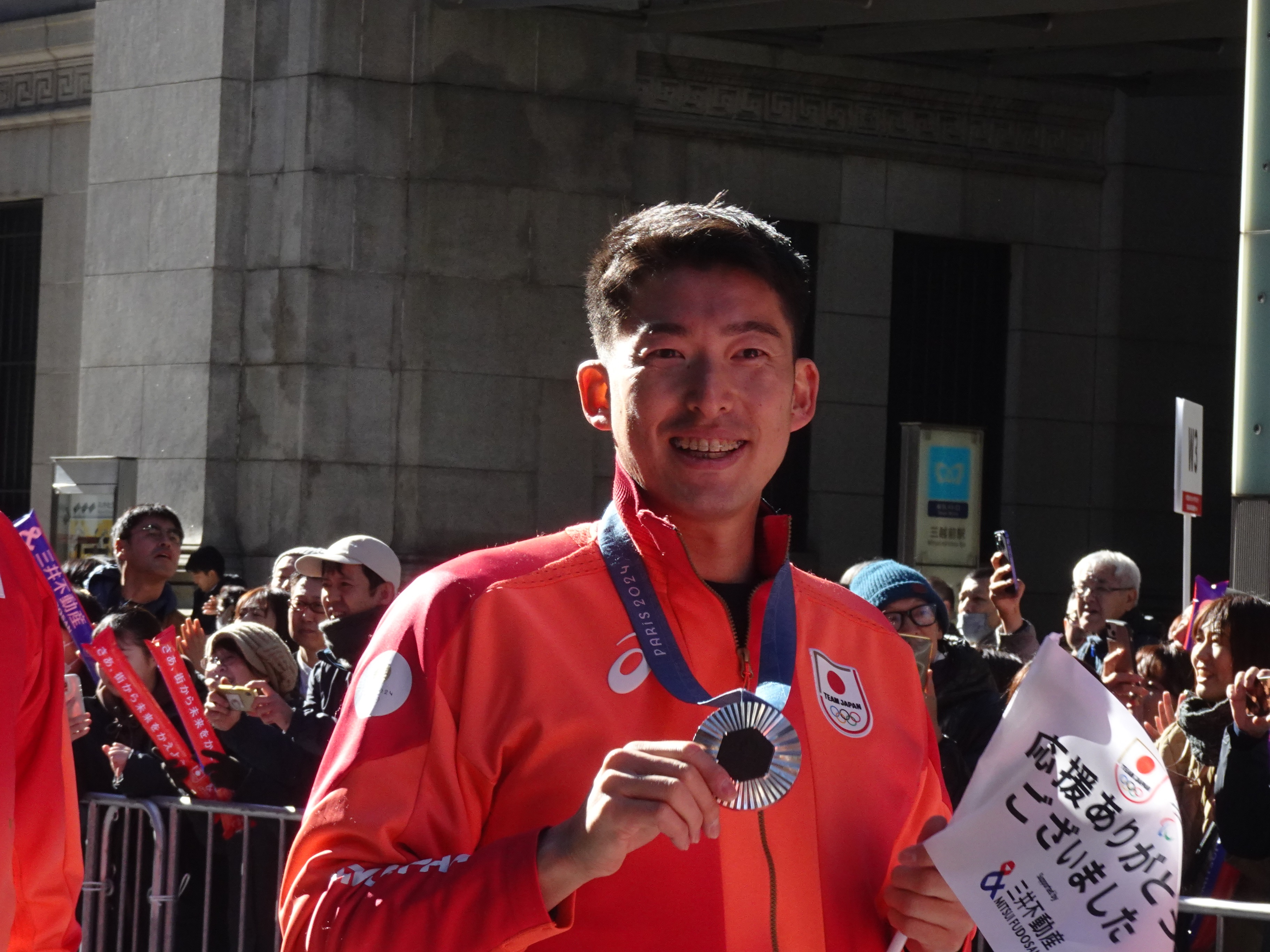
- Minobe at Paris 2024 Summer Olympians and Paralympians Japan National Team parade event on November 30, 2024

Personal information
- Nickname: Kazu (カズ)
- Born: 15 July 1987 (age 39) Echizen, Fukui Prefecture, Japan
- Height: 1.77 m (5 ft 10 in)
- Weight: 75 kg (165 lb)

Fencing career
- Sport: Fencing
- Country: Japan
- Weapon: Épée
- Hand: left-handed
- National coach: Oleksandr Horbachuk
- Club: Nexus
- Head coach: Hiroshi Hashimoto
- FIE ranking: current ranking
Medal record
Men's épée
Representing Japan
Olympic Games
Gold medal – first place	2020 Tokyo	Team
Silver medal – second place	2024 Paris	Team
World Championships
Silver medal – second place	2022 Cairo	Individual
Bronze medal – third place	2022 Cairo	Team
Asian Championships
Gold medal – first place	2016 Wuxi	Team
Silver medal – second place	2024 Kuwait City	Team
Bronze medal – third place	2012 Wakayama	Team
Bronze medal – third place	2014 Suwon	Team
Bronze medal – third place	2015 Singapore	Individual
Bronze medal – third place	2015 Singapore	Team
Bronze medal – third place	2016 Wuxi	Individual
Bronze medal – third place	2017 Hong Kong	Team
Bronze medal – third place	2019 Chiba	Team
Asian Games
Gold medal – first place	2018 Jakarta-Palembang	Team
Silver medal – second place	2014 Incheon	Team
Bronze medal – third place	2010 Guangzhou	Team

Kazuyasu Minobe (見延 和靖, Minobe Kazuyasu; born 15 July 1987) is a Japanese left-handed épée fencer, 2016 team Asian champion, two-time Olympian, and 2021 team Olympic champion.

Along with Koki Kano, Masaru Yamada, and Satoru Uyama, Minobe was a member of the Japanese team that won gold in the team men's épée event at the 2020 Tokyo Olympic Games. It was Japan's first Olympic gold medal in fencing.

== Career ==
Minobe's first sport was volleyball. He took up fencing in high school, on his father's advice. He made his international debut in 2008 and joined the Japanese national team, with whom he won a bronze medal at the 2010 Asian Games in Guangzhou and a silver medal at the 2014 Asian Games in Incheon.

== Medal record ==
=== Olympic Games ===
Year	Location	Event	Position
2021	Tokyo, Japan	Team Men's Épée	1st
2024	Paris, France	Team Men's Épée	2nd

=== World Championship ===
Year	Location	Event	Position
2022	Cairo, Egypt	Individual Men's Épée	2nd
2022	Cairo, Egypt	Team Men's Épée	3rd

=== Asian Championship ===
Year	Location	Event	Position
2014	Suwon, South Korea	Team Men's Épée	3rd
2015	Singapore	Individual Men's Épée	3rd
2015	Singapore	Team Men's Épée	3rd
2016	Wuxi, China	Individual Men's Épée	3rd
2016	Wuxi, China	Team Men's Épée	1st
2017	Hong Kong, China	Team Men's Épée	3rd
2019	Tokyo, Japan	Team Men's Épée	3rd

=== Grand Prix ===
Date	Location	Event	Position
2017-03-24	Budapest, Hungary	Individual Men's Épée	2nd
2019-03-08	Budapest, Hungary	Individual Men's Épée	1st
2019-05-03	Bogotá, Colombia	Individual Men's Épée	1st

=== World Cup ===
Date	Location	Event	Position
2015-11-13	Tallinn, Estonia	Individual Men's Épée	1st
2018-01-25	Heidenheim, Germany	Individual Men's Épée	1st
2018-11-23	Bern, Switzerland	Individual Men's Épée	1st
