= Dávid Nagy (fencer) =

Hungarian fencer

Medal record

Men's épée

Representing Hungary

Olympic Games
| Gold medal – first place | 2024 Paris | Team |

European Games
| Gold medal – first place | 2023 Kraków–Małopolska | Team |

European Championships
| Gold medal – first place | 2023 Kraków | Team |

Dávid Nagy (born 14 July 1999) is a Hungarian fencer. He competed at the 2024 Summer Olympics.

== Medal record ==
=== Olympic Games ===
| Year | Location | Event | Position |
|---|---|---|---|
| 2024 | Paris, France | Team Men's Épée | 1st |
