= Conrad Kongstad =

Danish fencer

Personal information
- Full name: Conrad Seibæk Kongstad
- Born: 11 February 1997 (age 29)

Sport
- Country: Denmark
- Sport: Fencing
Medal record
Representing Denmark
Men's fencing
European Championships
Bronze medal – third place	2026 Antony	Individual

Conrad Seibæk Kongstad (born 11 February 1997) is a Danish fencer. He competed at the 2026 European Fencing Championships, winning the bronze medal in the men's épée event.
