= Máté Tamás Koch =

Hungarian fencer (born 1999)

Máté Koch
Personal information
- Full name: Máté Tamás Koch
- Born: 17 September 1999 (age 27) Komárom, Hungary

Fencing career
- Sport: Fencing
- Country: Hungary
- Weapon: épée
- Club: Vasas
- Personal coach: Péter Halla
Medal record
Men's épée
Representing Hungary
Olympic Games
| Gold medal – first place | 2024 Paris | Team |
World Championships
| Gold medal – first place | 2023 Milan | Individual |
| Silver medal – second place | 2025 Tbilisi | Team |
European Games
| Gold medal – first place | 2023 Kraków–Małopolska | Team |
European Championships
| Gold medal – first place | 2023 Kraków | Team |
Junior World Championships
| Gold medal – first place | 2019 Toruń | Team |
| Gold medal – first place | 2018 Verona | Team |
| Bronze medal – third place | 2017 Plovdiv | Team |
| Bronze medal – third place | 2018 Verona | Individual |

Máté Tamás Koch (born 17 September 1999) is a Hungarian épée fencer. He won the Men's épée competition at the 2023 World Fencing Championships.

He lives in Budapest, Hungary. His fencing club is Vasas SC, in Budapest, and his coach is Péter Halla.

== Fencing career ==
In April 2017 at the 2017 Junior World Fencing Championships in Plovdiv, Bulgaria, he won a bronze medal in team épée with Hungary. In January 2018 he won a bronze medal in men's épée at the 2018 European Junior Championships.

In January 2019 he won a gold medal in team with Hungary in men's épée at the 2019 European Junior Championships. In April 2019 at the 2019 Junior World Fencing Championships in Toruń, Poland, he won a team gold medal with Hungary. In June 2023 he won a gold medal in épée team with Hungary at the 2023 European Games in Kraków, Poland.

He won the 2023 world men's épée championship in Milan, Italy. In the last three rounds he defeated teammate and former world champion Gergely Siklósi, Ruslan Kurbanov of Kazakhstan, and Davide Di Veroli of Italy.

== Medal record ==
=== Olympic Games ===
| Year | Location | Event | Position |
|---|---|---|---|
| 2024 | Paris, France | Team Men's Épée | 1st |
