= Michal Čupr =

Czech fencer

Personal information
- Born: December 23, 1991 (age 34) Ústí nad Labem, Czechoslovakia

Sport
- Country: Czech Republic
- Sport: Fencing
- Event: épée
Medal record
Men's épée
Representing the Czech Republic
Olympic Games
| Bronze medal – third place | 2024 Paris | Team |

Michal Čupr (born 23 December 1991) is a Czech fencer. He competed at the 2024 Summer Olympics.

At the 2024 Summer Olympics, Čupr along with Jakub Jurka, Martin Rubeš and Jiří Beran won a bronze medal in the Men's team épée.

== Medal record ==
=== Olympic Games ===
| Year | Location | Event | Position |
|---|---|---|---|
| 2024 | Paris, France | Team Men's Épée | 3rd |
