= Martin Rubeš =

Czech fencer

Personal information
- Nationality: Czech
- Born: 16 September 1996 (age 30) Karlovy Vary, Czech Republic

Sport
- Country: Czech Republic
- Sport: Fencing
- Coached by: Martin Rubeš st.
Medal record
Men's épée
Representing the Czech Republic
Olympic Games
Bronze medal – third place	2024 Paris	Team
Universiade
Gold medal – first place	2019 Naples	Épée individual

Martin Rubeš (born 16 September 1996) is a Czech fencer who won a gold medal at the 2019 Summer Universiade.

== Biography ==
At the 2024 Summer Olympics, Rubeš along with Jakub Jurka, Jiří Beran and Michal Čupr won a bronze medal in the Men's team épée. Rubeš began fencing at the age of eight in his hometown of Karlovy Vary, following in the footsteps of his father, who was also an international fencer.

== Medal record ==
=== Olympic Games ===
Year	Location	Event	Position
2024	Paris, France	Team Men's Épée	3rd

== See also ==
- Czech Republic at the 2019 Summer Universiade
