= Jakub Jurka =

Czech fencer (born 1999)

Personal information
- Nationality: Czech
- Born: 13 June 1999 (age 27) Olomouc, Czech Republic

Sport
- Country: Czech Republic
- Sport: Fencing
- Event: épée
- Club: TJ Dukla Olomouc
Medal record
Men's épée
Representing the Czech Republic
Olympic Games
Bronze medal – third place	2024 Paris	Team

Jakub Jurka (Czech pronunciation: [ˈjakup ˈjurka]; born 13 June 1999) is a Czech fencer. His grandfather Jaroslav Jurka was also a fencer who represented Czechoslovakia at the 1976 Summer Olympics and 1980 Summer Olympics.

He represented Czech Republic at the 2020 Summer Olympics which also marked his debut appearance at the Olympics. During the 2020 Summer Olympics, he competed in the men's épée event.

At the 2024 Summer Olympics, Jurka along with Martin Rubeš, Jiří Beran and Michal Čupr won a bronze medal in the Men's team épée.

== Medal record ==
=== Olympic Games ===
Year	Location	Event	Position
2024	Paris, France	Team Men's Épée	3rd
