= Mohamed El-Sayed (fencer) =

Egyptian fencer (born 2003)

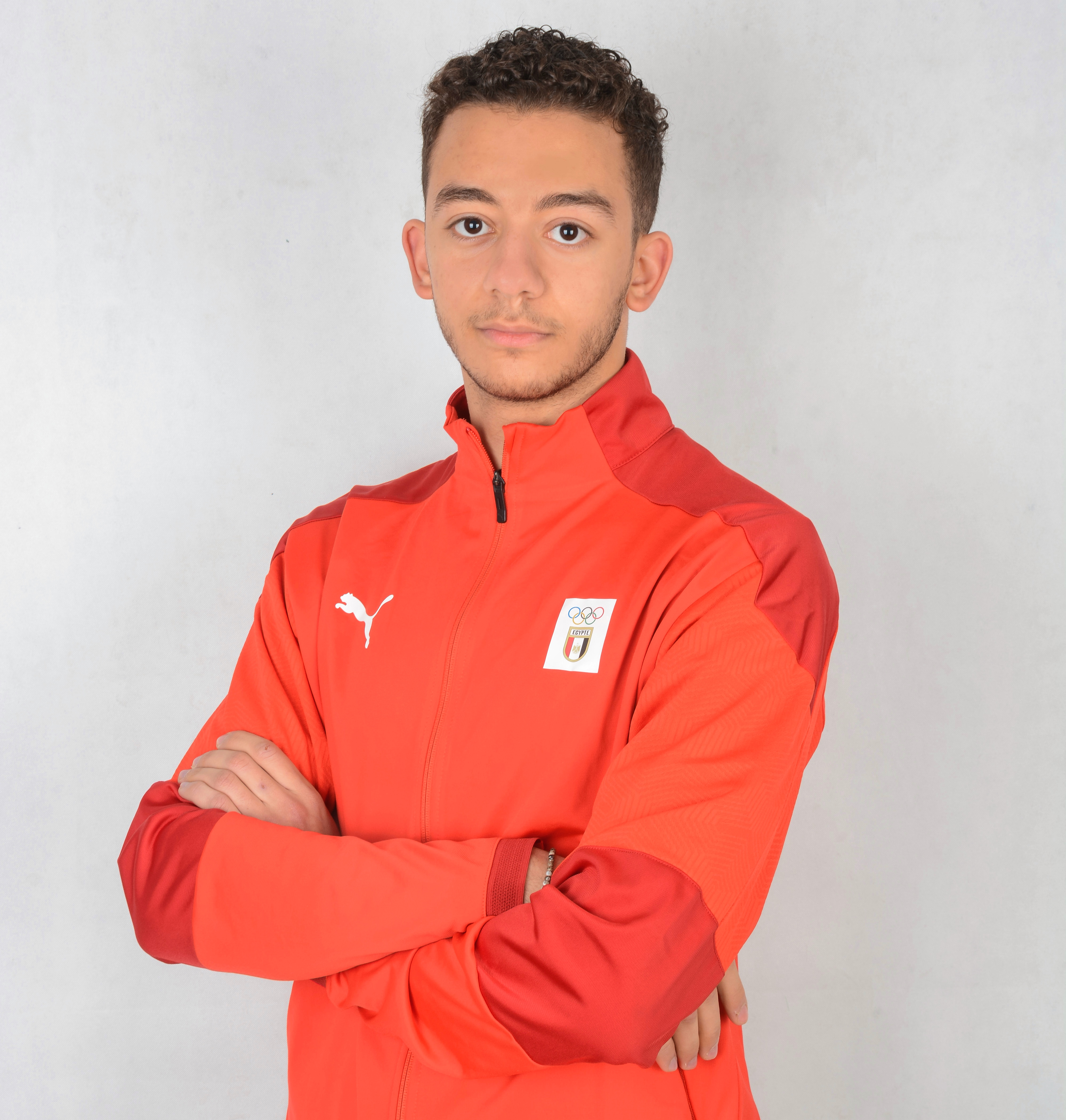
- El-Sayed in 2022

Personal information
- Full name: Mohamed Elsayed Samy Salaheldin Nada Saleh
- Nationality: Egyptian
- Born: 3 March 2003 (age 23) Cairo, Egypt

Sport
- Sport: Fencing
Medal record
Men's épée
Representing Egypt
Olympic Games
Bronze medal – third place	2024 Paris	Individual
World Championships
Bronze medal – third place	2026 Hong Kong	Team
African Championships
Gold medal – first place	2024 Casablanca	Individual
Gold medal – first place	2024 Casablanca	Team
Gold medal – first place	2026 Abidjan	Individual
Mediterranean Games
Gold medal – first place	2022 Oran	Individual
Gold medal – first place	2026 Taranto	Individual
Junior World Championships
Gold medal – first place	2022 Dubai	Team
Gold medal – first place	2023 Plovdiv	Team
Bronze medal – third place	2021 Cairo	Individual
Bronze medal – third place	2021 Cairo	Team

Mohamed El-Sayed (محمد السيد; born 3 March 2003) is an Egyptian épée fencer. He won Egypt's first medal at the 2024 Summer Olympics by securing bronze in the men's individual épée event. Earlier in his career, he became the 2022 Mediterranean champion after winning gold in the men's individual épée at the 2022 Mediterranean Games in Oran, Algeria. He further established himself as Africa's top épée fencer by winning both individual and team gold medals at the 2024 African Fencing Championships in Casablanca.

== Career ==
El-Sayed emerged on the international scene during the 2022 season when he claimed the men's individual épée title at the 2022 Mediterranean Games in Oran, Algeria. His victory marked an achievement for Egyptian fencing on the continental stage.

In 2024, El-Sayed dominated the 2024 African Fencing Championships in Casablanca, where he secured double gold by winning both the individual épée competition and contributing to Egypt's team épée championship victory. These results qualified him for the 2024 Summer Olympics in Paris.

At the Paris Olympics, El-Sayed delivered Egypt's first medal of the Games. He advanced to the semifinals of the men's individual épée event before ultimately securing the bronze medal, becoming the first Egyptian fencer to medal at an Olympics since Alaaeldin Abouelkassem's silver at London 2012. His Olympic performance included victories over world-class opponents before his semifinal loss to eventual gold medalist Koki Kano of Japan.

== Medal record ==
=== Olympic Games ===
Year	Location	Event	Position
2024	Paris, France	Individual Men's Épée	3rd
