= Jiří Beran =

Czech fencer (born 1982)

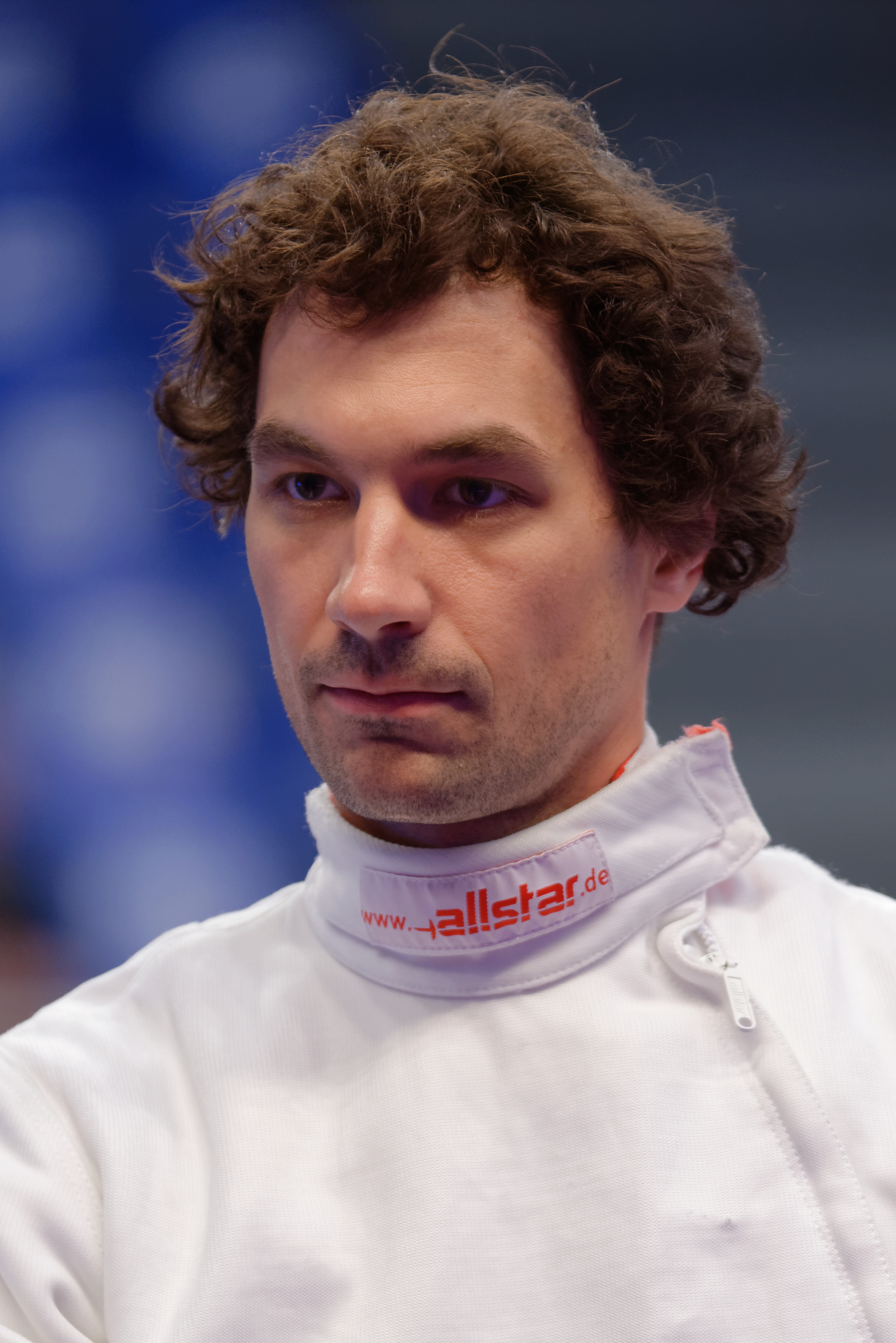
- Jiří Beran in 2015

Personal information
- Born: 18 January 1982 (age 44) Prague, Czechoslovakia

Sport
- Country: Czech Republic
- Sport: Fencing
- Event: épée
Medal record
Men's épée
Representing the Czech Republic
Olympic Games
Bronze medal – third place	2024 Paris	Team
European Championships
Bronze medal – third place	2017 Tbilisi	Team
Bronze medal – third place	2019 Düsseldorf	Individual

Jiří Beran (born 18 January 1982) is a Czech fencer. He competed in the men's épée event at the 2016 and 2024 Summer Olympics.

At the 2024 Summer Olympics, Beran along with Jakub Jurka, Martin Rubeš and Michal Čupr won a bronze medal in the Men's team épée.

== Medal record ==
=== Olympic Games ===
Year	Location	Event	Position
2024	Paris, France	Team Men's Épée	3rd
