= Men's foil at the 2025 World Fencing Championships =

- Venue: Olympic Palace
- Location: Tbilisi, Georgia
- Dates: 22 July (preliminaries); 23 July (finals)
- Competitors: 64 from 26 nations

Medalists
gold medal	Ryan Choi	Hong Kong
silver medal	Kirill Borodachev
bronze medal	Gergő Szemes	Hungary
bronze medal	Maxime Pauty	France

The Men's foil competition at the 2025 World Fencing Championships was held on 22 and 23 July 2025.

== Draw ==
=== Finals ===
Semifinals
(Hungary) Gergő Szemes	11
(Hong Kong) Ryan Choi	15
(France) Maxime Pauty	12
Kirill Borodachev	15

Final
(Hong Kong) Ryan Choi	15
Kirill Borodachev	9

=== Top half ===
==== Section 1 ====
Round of 64
(United States) Alexander Massialas	15
(Belgium) Oscar Geudvert	10
(France) Anas Anane	15
Anton Borodachev	6
(Japan) Kyosuke Matsuyama	15
(Belgium) Stef De Greef	7
(United Kingdom) Jaimie Cook	14
(Hungary) Dániel Dósa	15
(Spain) Carlos Llavador	15
(Chile) Leopoldo Alarcón	6
(Serbia) Veljko Ćuk	3
(Hungary) Gergő Szemes	15
(United States Virgin Islands) Kruz Schembri	6
Aleksandr Kerik	15
(Hungary) Andor Mihályi	5
(Czech Republic) Alexander Choupenitch	15

Round of 32
(United States) Alexander Massialas	15
(France) Anas Anane	14
(Japan) Kyosuke Matsuyama	12
(Hungary) Dániel Dósa	15
(Spain) Carlos Llavador	13
(Hungary) Gergő Szemes	15
Aleksandr Kerik	2
(Czech Republic) Alexander Choupenitch	15

Round of 16
(United States) Alexander Massialas	11
(Hungary) Dániel Dósa	15
(Hungary) Gergő Szemes	15
(Czech Republic) Alexander Choupenitch	7

Quarterfinals
(Hungary) Dániel Dósa	11
(Hungary) Gergő Szemes	15

==== Section 2 ====
Round of 64
(Italy) Guillaume Bianchi	15
(Czech Republic) Lev Holý	3
(Canada) Borys Budovskyi	14
(Hong Kong) Lawrence Ng	15
Vladislav Mylnikov	15
(Poland) Adrian Wojtkowiak	7
(Cyprus) Alex Tofalides	9
(Hong Kong) Ryan Choi	15
(United States) Gerek Meinhardt	6
(Poland) Michał Siess	15
(United Kingdom) David Williams	7
(France) Pierre Loisel	15
(United States) Bryce Louie	15
(Germany) Bastian Kappus	14
(Croatia) Petar Fileš	7
(Italy) Filippo Macchi	15

Round of 32
(Italy) Guillaume Bianchi	15
(Hong Kong) Lawrence Ng	6
Vladislav Mylnikov	7
(Hong Kong) Ryan Choi	15
(Poland) Michał Siess	13
(France) Pierre Loisel	15
(United States) Bryce Louie	10
(Italy) Filippo Macchi	15

Round of 16
(Italy) Guillaume Bianchi	10
(Hong Kong) Ryan Choi	15
(France) Pierre Loisel	11
(Italy) Filippo Macchi	15

Quarterfinals
(Hong Kong) Ryan Choi	15
(Italy) Filippo Macchi	14

=== Bottom half ===
==== Section 3 ====
Round of 64
(United States) Nick Itkin	15
(Hong Kong) Leung Chin Yu	9
(China) Zeng Zhaoran	15
(South Korea) Lee Kwang-hyun	6
(China) Xu Jie	14
(Australia) Joseph Glasson	15
(France) Rafael Savin	11
(France) Maxime Pauty	15
(Japan) Kazuki Iimura	15
(South Korea) Kim Tae-hwan	8
(China) Guo Yifan	10
(Poland) Leszek Rajski	15
(Japan) Yudai Nagano	15
(Austria) Tobias Reichetzer	6
(Belgium) Mathieu Nijs	9
(Italy) Tommaso Marini	15

Round of 32
(United States) Nick Itkin	12
(China) Zeng Zhaoran	15
(Australia) Joseph Glasson	9
(France) Maxime Pauty	15
(Japan) Kazuki Iimura	15
(Poland) Leszek Rajski	13
(Japan) Yudai Nagano	15
(Italy) Tommaso Marini	14

Round of 16
(China) Zeng Zhaoran	12
(France) Maxime Pauty	15
(Japan) Kazuki Iimura	15
(Japan) Yudai Nagano	7

Quarterfinals
(France) Maxime Pauty	15
(Japan) Kazuki Iimura	13

==== Section 4 ====
Round of 64
(Egypt) Mohamed Hamza	15
(Germany) Alexander Kahl	11
(Argentina) Andrea Nigosanti	8
(Hungary) Gergely Tóth	15
(Brazil) Guilherme Toldo	10
(Chile) Vicente Otayza	15
(Brazil) Paulo Morais	5
(Egypt) Abdelrahman Tolba	15
(Italy) Alessio Foconi	15
(Canada) Adrian Wong	2
(Japan) Shunsuke Baba	14
(China) Mo Ziwei	15
Kirill Borodachev	15
(Austria) Moritz Lechner	6
(Belgium) Stef Van Campenhout	15
(Hong Kong) Cheung Ka Long	12

Round of 32
(Egypt) Mohamed Hamza	15
(Hungary) Gergely Tóth	4
(Chile) Vicente Otayza	14
(Egypt) Abdelrahman Tolba	15
(Italy) Alessio Foconi	15
(China) Mo Ziwei	13
Kirill Borodachev	15
(Belgium) Stef Van Campenhout	11

Round of 16
(Egypt) Mohamed Hamza	15
(Egypt) Abdelrahman Tolba	11
(Italy) Alessio Foconi	14
Kirill Borodachev	15

Quarterfinals
(Egypt) Mohamed Hamza	14
Kirill Borodachev	15
