= Men's foil at the 2026 World Fencing Championships =

- Venue: AsiaWorld–Expo
- Location: Hong Kong
- Dates: 22 July (preliminaries); 25 July (finals)
- Competitors: 171 from 60 nations

Medalists
gold medal	Alexander Choupenitch	Czech Republic
silver medal	Filippo Macchi	Italy
bronze medal	Dániel Dósa	Hungary
bronze medal	Kazuki Iimura	Japan

The Men's foil competition at the 2026 World Fencing Championships was held on 22 and 25 July 2026.

== Draw ==
=== Finals ===
Semifinals
(Hungary) Dániel Dósa	8
(Czech Republic) Alexander Choupenitch	15
(Japan) Kazuki Iimura	6
(Italy) Filippo Macchi	15

Final
(Czech Republic) Alexander Choupenitch	15
(Italy) Filippo Macchi	2

=== Top half ===
==== Section 1 ====
Round of 64
(Hong Kong) Ryan Choi	15
(Venezuela) José Briceño	3
(Japan) Kyosuke Matsuyama	14
(Russia) Daniil Kerik	15
(Russia) Anton Borodachev	15
(Belgium) Oscar Geudvert	5
(Qatar) Ali Owaida	4
(Hungary) Dániel Dósa	15
(Egypt) Mohamed Hamza	10
(Mexico) Diego Cervantes	15
(Germany) Bastian Kappus	15
(Uzbekistan) Radmir Semeneev	10
(Brazil) Guilherme Toldo	15
(Belgium) Stef Van Campenhout	8
(Uzbekistan) Daniil Kravtsov	15
(United States) Nick Itkin	12

Round of 32
(Hong Kong) Ryan Choi	15
(Russia) Daniil Kerik	9
(Russia) Anton Borodachev	11
(Hungary) Dániel Dósa	15
(Mexico) Diego Cervantes	11
(Germany) Bastian Kappus	15
(Brazil) Guilherme Toldo	15
(Uzbekistan) Daniil Kravtsov	11

Round of 16
(Hong Kong) Ryan Choi	13
(Hungary) Dániel Dósa	15
(Germany) Bastian Kappus	3
(Brazil) Guilherme Toldo	15

Quarterfinals
(Hungary) Dániel Dósa	15
(Brazil) Guilherme Toldo	10

==== Section 2 ====
Round of 64
(Czech Republic) Alexander Choupenitch	15
(Mexico) Maximo Azuela	11
(Poland) Adam Jakubowski	15
(Chile) Leopoldo Alarcón	12
(China) Lyu Weiqiao	15
(Chinese Taipei) Chen Chih-chieh	10
(Ukraine) Davyd Knizhnyk	7
(France) Rafael Savin	15
(Hungary) Gergő Szemes	15
(China) Xu Jie	7
(Poland) Leszek Rajski	15
(Germany) Niklas Diestelkamp	12
(Hungary) Gergely Tóth	10
(Russia) Egor Barannikov	15
(Singapore) Raphael Tan	6
(United States) Alexander Massialas	15

Round of 32
(Czech Republic) Alexander Choupenitch	15
(Poland) Adam Jakubowski	6
(China) Lyu Weiqiao	12
(France) Rafael Savin	15
(Hungary) Gergő Szemes	15
(Poland) Leszek Rajski	11
(Russia) Egor Barannikov	15
(United States) Alexander Massialas	9

Round of 16
(Czech Republic) Alexander Choupenitch	15
(France) Rafael Savin	8
(Hungary) Gergő Szemes	14
(Russia) Egor Barannikov	15

Quarterfinals
(Czech Republic) Alexander Choupenitch	15
(Russia) Egor Barannikov	12

=== Bottom half ===
==== Section 3 ====
Round of 64
(Italy) Guillaume Bianchi	15
(Israel) Liam Haviv	5
(Croatia) Petar Fileš	13
(Germany) Alexander Kahl	15
(Italy) Tommaso Marini	15
(Singapore) Keyon Loo	13
(France) Anas Anane	15
(France) Maxime Pauty	7
(Egypt) Abdelrahman Tolba	15
(Brazil) Dominic de Almeida	4
(United Kingdom) Jaimie Cook	15
(Hong Kong) Harris Ho	12
(Poland) Jan Nowak	5
(Australia) Joseph Glasson	15
(Brazil) Pedro Marostega	6
(Japan) Kazuki Iimura	15

Round of 32
(Italy) Guillaume Bianchi	15
(Germany) Alexander Kahl	6
(Italy) Tommaso Marini	15
(France) Anas Anane	7
(Egypt) Abdelrahman Tolba	15
(United Kingdom) Jaimie Cook	4
(Australia) Joseph Glasson	13
(Japan) Kazuki Iimura	15

Round of 16
(Italy) Guillaume Bianchi	7
(Italy) Tommaso Marini	15
(Egypt) Abdelrahman Tolba	8
(Japan) Kazuki Iimura	15

Quarterfinals
(Italy) Tommaso Marini	11
(Japan) Kazuki Iimura	15

==== Section 4 ====
Round of 64
(Italy) Filippo Macchi	15
(South Korea) Kim Tae-hwan	13
(Germany) Luis Klein	5
(Japan) Toshiya Saito	15
(United States) Marcello Olivares	11
(South Korea) Lee Kwang-hyun	15
(South Korea) Im Cheol-woo	15
(Italy) Tommaso Martini	7
(Hong Kong) Cheung Ka Long	15
(France) Alexandre Sido	10
(United Kingdom) David Sosnov	15
(Canada) Jia Bao Xu	8
(South Korea) Youn Jeong-hyun	15
(United States) Bryce Louie	6
(Uzbekistan) Ulugbek Usmanov	4
(Russia) Kirill Borodachev	15

Round of 32
(Italy) Filippo Macchi	15
(Japan) Toshiya Saito	10
(South Korea) Lee Kwang-hyun	11
(South Korea) Im Cheol-woo	12
(Hong Kong) Cheung Ka Long	15
(United Kingdom) David Sosnov	12
(South Korea) Youn Jeong-hyun	9
(Russia) Kirill Borodachev	15

Round of 16
(Italy) Filippo Macchi	15
(South Korea) Im Cheol-woo	12
(Hong Kong) Cheung Ka Long	2
(Russia) Kirill Borodachev	15

Quarterfinals
(Italy) Filippo Macchi	15
(Russia) Kirill Borodachev	14
