= 2022–23 Fencing World Cup =

International fencing competition

- Edition: 52nd Fencing World Cup
- Duration: 10 November 2022 – July 2023
- Organiser: FIE

The 2022–23 Fencing World Cup was the 52nd edition of the Fencing World Cup, a fencing competition organized annually by the International Fencing Federation. It began on 10 November 2022 in Algiers and ended in July 2023 at the end of the World Championships. The official calendar included eight competitions (five category A tournaments and three Grand Prix) per discipline (epee, foil and sabre), in addition to the zone and world championships.

== Point distribution ==
=== Individual ===
The competitions on the calendar were divided into five categories. All earn edpoints counting for the world cup according to a pre-established coefficient: coefficient 1 for the world cup events and zone championships, coefficient 1.5 for the grand prix, coefficient 2.5 for the world championships and coefficient 3 for the Olympic Games. Satellite tournaments, intended to familiarize young fencers with international competitions, earned few points.

To calculate a fencer's ranking, only the five best point totals obtained during World Cup, Grand Prix or satellite events, as well as World and Zone Championships and Olympic Games counted.

	1st	2nd	3rd	5–8	9–16	17–32	33–64	65–96	97–128	129–256
Satellite	4	3	2	1	0					
Zonal Championships / World Cup	32	26	20	14	8	4	2	1	0,5	0,25
Grand Prix	48	39	30	21	12	6	3	1,5	0,75	0,375
World Championships	80	65	50	35	20	10	5	2,5	1,25	0,625
Olympic Games	96	78	60	42	24	12	6	3	1,5	0,75

=== Team ===
The point distribution was the same for all team competitions, except for the World Championships which earned double.

To calculate the ranking of a team, only the four best results of the World Cup events, as well as those of the World Championships or Olympic Games and the results of the zone championships counted.

Competition	1st	2nd	3rd	4th	5th	6th	7th	8th	9th	10th	11h	12th	13th	14th	15th	16th	17th–32nd
Zonal Championships / World Cup	64	52	40	36	32	30	28	26	25	24	23	22	21	20	19	18	8
World Championships	128	104	80	72	64	60	56	52	50	48	46	44	42	40	38	36	16

== Calendar ==
Legend	Abbreviation	Category
	ChM	World Championship
	ChZ	Zone Championship
	GP	Grand Prix
	CoM	World Cup

=== Women ===
==== Main circuit ====
Date	Tournament name and location	Cat.	Discipline	Type	Winner	Finalist	Third	Ref
10/11/2022	World Cup, Algiers	CoM	Sabre	Indiv.	(Spain) Lucía Martín-Portugués	(Italy) Michela Battiston	(France) Sara Balzer (Greece) Theodora Gkountoura	
10/11/2022	World Cup, Algiers	CoM	Sabre	Team	France Sara Balzer; Cécilia Berder; Caroline Queroli; Margaux Rifkiss	South Korea Choi Se-bin; Hong Ha-eun; Jeon Eun-hye; Yoon Ji-su	Italy Martina Criscio; Eloisa Passaro; Rossella Gregorio; Chiara Mormile	
11/11/2022	Glaive de Tallinn, Tallinn	CoM	Épée	Indiv.	(Italy) Alberta Santuccio	(France) Marie-Florence Candassamy	(South Korea) Song Se-ra (China) Zhu Mingye	
11/11/2022	Glaive de Tallinn, Tallinn	CoM	Épée	Team	Italy Rossella Fiamingo; Federica Isola; Roberta Marzani; Guilia Rizzi	Ukraine Inna Brovko; Vlada Kharkova; Ksenia Panteleeva; Yulia Svystil	France Marie-Florence Candassamy; Auriane Mallo; Éloïse Vanryssel; Coraline Vitalis	
08/12/2022	World Cup, Vancouver	CoM	Épée	Indiv.	(Italy) Giulia Rizzi	(Hong Kong) Vivian Kong	(Canada) Alexanne Verret (Hungary) Anna Kun	
08/12/2022	World Cup, Vancouver	CoM	Épée	Team	France Marie-Florence Candassamy; Auriane Mallo; Lauren Rembi; Jade Sersot	South Korea Choi In-jeong; Kang Young-mi; Lee Hye-in; Song Se-ra	Switzerland Valentina Bos; Pauline Brunner; Angeline Favre; Noemi Moeschlin	
09/12/2022	World Cup, Belgrade	CoM	Foil	Indiv.	(Italy) Alice Volpi	(Germany) Leonie Ebert	(Italy) Francesca Palumbo (United States) Lee Kiefer	
09/12/2022	World Cup, Belgrade	CoM	Foil	Team	Italy Erica Cipressa; Martina Favaretto; Francesca Palumbo; Alice Volpi	United States Jacqueline Dubrovich; Lee Kiefer; Zander Rhodes; Maia Mei Weintraub	France Anita Blaze; Solène Butruille; Morgane Patru; Pauline Ranvier	
09/12/2022	Trophée Nuoma, Orléans	GP	Sabre	Indiv.	(Italy) Martina Criscio	(France) Manon Brunet	(Greece) Déspina Georgiádou (Italy) Chiara Mormile	
12/01/2023	Mazars Challenge International de Paris, Paris	CoM	Foil	Indiv.	(Italy) Alice Volpi	(United States) Lee Kiefer	(Italy) Francesca Palumbo (France) Ysaora Thibus	
12/01/2023	Mazars Challenge International de Paris, Paris	CoM	Foil	Team	Italy Erica Cipressa; Martina Favaretto; Francesca Palumbo; Alice Volpi	United States Stefani Deschner; Jacqueline Dubrovich; Lee Kiefer; Zander Rhodes	Japan Sera Azuma; Komaki Kikuchi; Karin Miyawaki; Yuka Ueno	
13/01/2023	Grand Prix, Tunis	GP	Sabre	Indiv.	(Greece) Déspina Georgiádou	(Spain) Lucía Martín-Portugués	(Japan) Misaki Emura (Ukraine) Olha Kharlan	
27/01/2023	Grand Prix Qatar, Doha	GP	Épée	Indiv.	(Brazil) Nathalie Moellhausen	(France) Marie-Florence Candassamy	(Hong Kong) Vivian Kong (Hungary) Eszter Muhari	
10/02/2023	Ville de Barcelone, Barcelona	CoM	Épée	Indiv.	(Brazil) Nathalie Moellhausen	(South Korea) Kang Young-mi	(France) Auriane Mallo (China) Sun Yiwen	
10/02/2023	Ville de Barcelone, Barcelona	CoM	Épée	Team	South Korea Kang Young-mi; Lee Hye-in; Song Se-ra; Yu Dan-woo	Italy Rossella Fiamingo; Federica Isola; Mara Navarria; Alberta Santuccio	China Lin Sheng; Sun Yiwen; Xu Nuo; Yu Sihan	
10/02/2023	World Cup, Tashkent	CoM	Sabre	Indiv.	(Greece) Despina Georgiadou	(Greece) Theodora Gkountoura	(Japan) Misaki Emura (United States) Elizabeth Tartakovsky	
10/02/2023	World Cup, Tashkent	CoM	Sabre	Team	Bulgaria Olga Hramova; Yoana Ilieva; Emma Neikova	Azerbaijan Anna Bashta; Valeriya Bolshakova; Sabina Karimova; Palina Kaspiarovich	South Korea Choi Se-bin; Jeon Ha-young; Jeon Eun-hye; Yoon Ji-su	
10/02/2023	Grand Prix, Turin	GP	Foil	Indiv.	(France) Ysaora Thibus	(Italy) Erica Cipressa	(Italy) Camilla Mancini (Ukraine) Alina Poloziuk	
23/02/2023	World Cup, Cairo	CoM	Foil	Indiv.	(Italy) Martina Favaretto	(Italy) Martina Batini	(Poland) Julia Walczyk-Klimaszyk (United States) Lee Kiefer	
23/02/2023	World Cup, Cairo	CoM	Foil	Team	Italy Erica Cipressa; Martina Favaretto; Francesca Palumbo; Alice Volpi	United States Jacqueline Dubrovich; Lee Kiefer; Lauren Scruggs; Maia Mei Weintraub	Japan Sera Azuma; Komaki Kikuchi; Sumire Tsuji; Yuka Ueno	
03/03/2023	Coupe Akropolis, Athens	CoM	Sabre	Indiv.	(Hungary) Sugár Katinka Battai	(Ukraine) Olga Kharlan	(France) Manon Apithy-Brunet (Greece) Theodora Gkountoura	
03/03/2023	Coupe Akropolis, Athens	CoM	Sabre	Team	France Manon Apithy-Brunet; Sara Balzer; Caroline Quéroli; Margaux Rifkiss	South Korea Choi Se-bin; Jeon Ha-young; Jeon Eun-hye; Yoon Ji-su	Italy Michela Battiston; Martina Criscio; Rossella Gregorio; Chiara Mormile	
10/03/2023	Grand Prix WESTEND, Budapest	GP	Épée	Indiv.	(Poland) Renata Knapik-Miazga	(Hungary) Anna Kun	(France) Marie-Florence Candassamy (Estonia) Nelli Differt	
17/03/2023	World Cup, Sint-Niklaas	CoM	Sabre	Indiv.	(France) Sara Balzer	(China) Shao Yaqi	(Italy) Rossella Gregorio (Greece) Theodora Gkountoura	
17/03/2023	World Cup, Sint-Niklaas	CoM	Sabre	Team	South Korea Choi Se-bin; Jeon Eun-hye; Lee Ha-nah; Yun So-yeon	Italy Michela Battiston; Martina Criscio; Rossella Gregorio; Chiara Mormile	Ukraine Yuliya Bakastova; Olga Kharlan; Alina Komashchuk; Olena Kravatska	
17/03/2023	Grand Prix, Busan	GP	Foil	Indiv.	(United States) Lee Kiefer	(Japan) Sera Azuma	(Italy) Martina Sinigalia (Italy) Alice Volpi	
24/03/2023	World Cup, Chengdu	CoM	Épée	Indiv.				
24/03/2023	World Cup, Chengdu	CoM	Épée	Team				
21/04/2023	World Cup, Poznań	CoM	Foil	Indiv.				
21/04/2023	World Cup, Poznań	CoM	Foil	Team				
27/04/2023	Grand Prix, Seoul	GP	Sabre	Indiv.				
05/05/2023	Grand Prix, Cali	GP	Épée	Indiv.				
05/05/2023	~~World Cup,~~; ~~Tauberbischofsheim~~ (Note: German Fencing Federation refused to host the event due to recent decision by FIE to allow Russian and Belarusian athletes compete again.)	CoM	Foil	Indiv.				
05/05/2023	~~World Cup,~~; ~~Tauberbischofsheim~~	CoM	Foil	Team				
12/05/2023	World Cup, Batumi	CoM	Sabre	Indiv.				
12/05/2023	World Cup, Batumi	CoM	Sabre	Team				
19/05/2023	World Cup, Emirate of Abu Dhabi	CoM	Épée	Indiv.				
19/05/2023	World Cup, Emirate of Abu Dhabi	CoM	Épée	Team				
19/05/2023	Grand Prix, Shanghai	GP	Foil	Indiv.				
01/06/2023	Asian Championships, Wuxi	ChZ	Épée	Indiv.				
01/06/2023	Asian Championships, Wuxi	ChZ	Épée	Team				
01/06/2023	Asian Championships, Wuxi	ChZ	Foil	Indiv.				
01/06/2023	Asian Championships, Wuxi	ChZ	Foil	Team				
01/06/2023	Asian Championships, Wuxi	ChZ	Sabre	Indiv.				
01/06/2023	Asian Championships, Wuxi	ChZ	Sabre	Team				
01/06/2023	African Championships, Cairo	ChZ	Épée	Indiv.				
01/06/2023	African Championships, Cairo	ChZ	Épée	Team				
01/06/2023	African Championships, Cairo	ChZ	Foil	Indiv.				
01/06/2023	African Championships, Cairo	ChZ	Foil	Team				
01/06/2023	African Championships, Cairo	ChZ	Sabre	Indiv.				
01/06/2023	African Championships, Cairo	ChZ	Sabre	Team				
01/06/2023	Pan American Championships, Lima	ChZ	Épée	Indiv.				
01/06/2023	Pan American Championships, Lima	ChZ	Épée	Team				
01/06/2023	Pan American Championships, Lima	ChZ	Foil	Indiv.				
01/06/2023	Pan American Championships, Lima	ChZ	Foil	Team				
01/06/2023	Pan American Championships, Lima	ChZ	Sabre	Indiv.				
01/06/2023	Pan American Championships, Lima	ChZ	Sabre	Team				
01/06/2023	European Championships, Plovdiv	ChZ	Épée	Indiv.				
01/06/2023	European Championships, Plovdiv	ChZ	Épée	Team				
01/06/2023	European Championships, Plovdiv	ChZ	Foil	Indiv.				
01/06/2023	European Championships, Plovdiv	ChZ	Foil	Team				
01/06/2023	European Championships, Plovdiv	ChZ	Sabre	Indiv.				
01/06/2023	European Championships, Plovdiv	ChZ	Sabre	Team				
22/07/2023	World Championships, Milan	ChM	Épée	Indiv.	(France) Marie-Florence Candassamy	(Italy) Alberta Santuccio	(Italy) Mara Navarria (China) Sun Yiwen	
22/07/2023	World Championships, Milan	ChM	Épée	Team	Poland Renata Knapik-Miazga; Magdalena Pawłowska; Martyna Swatowska-Wenglarczyk; Ewa Trzebińska	Italy Rossella Fiamingo; Federica Isola; Mara Navarria; Alberta Santuccio	South Korea Choi In-jeong; Kang Young-mi; Lee Hye-in; Song Se-ra	
22/07/2023	World Championships, Milan	ChM	Foil	Indiv.	(Italy) Alice Volpi	(Italy) Arianna Errigo	(Italy) Martina Favaretto (United States) Lee Kiefer	
22/07/2023	World Championships, Milan	ChM	Foil	Team	Italy Arianna Errigo; Martina Favaretto; Francesca Palumbo; Alice Volpi	France Solène Butruille; Morgane Patru; Pauline Ranvier; Ysaora Thibus	Japan Sera Azuma; Komaki Kikuchi; Karin Miyawaki; Yuka Ueno	
22/07/2023	World Championships, Milan	ChM	Sabre	Indiv.	(Japan) Misaki Emura	(Greece) Despina Georgiadou	(Greece) Theodora Gkountoura (Bulgaria) Yoana Ilieva	
22/07/2023	World Championships, Milan	ChM	Sabre	Team	Hungary Sugár Katinka Battai; Anna Márton; Liza Pusztai; Luca Szűcs	France Sara Balzer; Manon Brunet; Caroline Queroli; Margaux Rifkiss	South Korea Choi Se-bin; Jeon Eun-hye; Jeon Ha-young; Yoon Ji-su	

=== Men ===
==== Main circuit ====
Date	Tournament name and location	Cat.	Discipline	Type	Winner	Finalist	Third	Ref
10/11/2022	World Cup, Algiers	CoM	Sabre	Indiv.	(Georgia (country)) Sandro Bazadze	(Italy) Luigi Samele	(France) Boladé Apithy (Egypt) Ziad El-Sissy	
10/11/2022	World Cup, Algiers	CoM	Sabre	Team	South Korea Kim Jung-hwan; Do Gyeong-dong; Gu Bon-gil; Oh Sang-uk	Iran Ali Pakdaman; Farzad Baher Arasbaran; Mohammad Fotouhi; Mohammad Rahbari	Germany Frederic Kindler; Matyas Szabo; Raoul Bonah; Lorenz Kempf	
11/11/2022	Grand Prix von Bern, Bern	CoM	Épée	Indiv.	(Hungary) Tibor Andrasfi	(Colombia) Jhon Édison Rodríguez	(Japan) Koki Kano (France) Luidgi Midelton	
11/11/2022	Grand Prix von Bern, Bern	CoM	Épée	Team	France Romain Cannone; Yannick Borel; Daniel Jérent; Alexandre Bardenet	South Korea Kim Dae-eon; Kweon Young-jun; Ma Se-geon; Jung Byeung-chan	Hungary David Nagy; Máté Tamás Koch; Gergely Siklósi; Tibor Andrasfi	
11/11/2022	Lion of Bonn, Bonn	CoM	Foil	Indiv.	(Japan) Kyosuke Matsuyama	(Italy) Alessio Foconi	(France) Enzo Lefort (United Kingdom) Marcus Mepstead	
11/11/2022	Lion of Bonn, Bonn	CoM	Foil	Team	United States Chase Emmer; Nick Itkin; Alexander Massialas; Gerek Meinhardt	Italy Guillaume Bianchi; Alessio Foconi; Daniele Garozzo; Tommaso Marini	France Maximilien Chastanet; Enzo Lefort; Pierre Loisel; Rafael Savin	
08/12/2022	Trophée Nuoma, Orléans	GP	Sabre	Indiv.	(Hungary) Áron Szilágyi	(Georgia (country)) Sandro Bazadze	(Italy) Luca Curatoli (South Korea) Kim Jung-hwan	
09/12/2022	World Cup, Vancouver	CoM	Épée	Indiv.	(Hungary) Gergely Siklósi	(France) Yannick Borel	(China) Lan Minghao (France) Alexandre Bardenet	
09/12/2022	World Cup, Vancouver	CoM	Épée	Team	France Alexandre Bardenet; Yannick Borel; Romain Cannone; Alex Fava	Italy Gabriele Cimini; Valerio Cuomo; Davide Di Veroli; Andrea Santarelli	Japan Koki Kano; Akira Komata; Ryu Matsumoto; Masaru Yamada	
09/12/2022	Prince Takamado Trophy, Tokyo	CoM	Foil	Indiv.	(Italy) Tommaso Marini	(France) Maxime Pauty	(Japan) Yudai Nagano (Egypt) Alaaeldin Abouelkassem	
09/12/2022	Prince Takamado Trophy, Tokyo	CoM	Foil	Team	United States Miles Chamley-Watson; Nick Itkin; Alexander Massialas; Gerek Meinhardt	Japan Kazuka Imura; Kyosuke Matsuyama; Takahiro Shikine; Kenta Suzumura	Italy Guillaume Bianchi; Alessio Foconi; Daniele Garozzo; Tommaso Marini	
12/01/2023	Mazars Challenge International de Paris, Paris	CoM	Foil	Indiv.	(Hong Kong) Cheung Ka Long	(Italy) Edoardo Luperi	(United States) Emmer Chase (Italy) Alessio Foconi	
12/01/2023	Mazars Challenge International de Paris, Paris	CoM	Foil	Team	Italy Guillaume Bianchi; Alessio Foconi; Daniele Garozzo; Tommaso Marini	United States Miles Chamley-Watson; Nick Itkin; Alexander Massialas; Gerek Meinhardt	Japan Kazuki Iimura; Kyosuke Matsuyama; Takahiro Shikine; Kenta Suzumura	
13/01/2023	Grand Prix, Tunis	GP	Sabre	Indiv.	(Georgia (country)) Sandro Bazadze	(Italy) Luigi Samele	(United States) Eli Dershwitz (Hungary) András Szatmári	
27/01/2023	Grand Prix Qatar, Doha	GP	Épée	Indiv.	(Hungary) Gergely Siklósi	(Belgium) Neisser Loyola	(France) Yannick Borel (Japan) Akira Komata	
10/02/2023	Sabre de Wołodyjowski, Warsaw	CoM	Sabre	Indiv.	(Poland) Krzysztof Kaczkowski	(Georgia (country)) Sandro Bazadze	(Italy) Michele Gallo (Italy) Luigi Samele	
10/02/2023	Sabre de Wołodyjowski, Warsaw	CoM	Sabre	Team	South Korea Do Gyeong-dong; Gu Bon-gil; Ha Han-sol; Kim Jun-ho	Hungary Tamás Decsi; Csanád Gémesi; András Szatmári; Áron Szilágyi	United States Eli Dershwitz; Daryl Homer; Andrew Mackiewicz; Grant Williams	
10/02/2023	Trophée INALPI, Turin	GP	Foil	Indiv.	(United States) Gerek Meinhardt	(Italy) Filippo Macchi	(Czech Republic) Alexander Choupenitch (Italy) Daniele Garozzo	
23/02/2023	Coupe d'Heidenheim, Heidenheim an der Brenz	CoM	Épée	Indiv.	(Japan) Koki Kano	(Switzerland) Alexis Bayard	(Kazakhstan) Ruslan Kurbanov (Spain) Yulen Pereira	
23/02/2023	Coupe d'Heidenheim, Heidenheim an der Brenz	CoM	Épée	Team	France Alexandre Bardenet; Romain Cannone; Clément Dorigo; Alex Fava	Italy Gabriele Cimini; Valerio Cuomo; Davide Di Veroli; Andrea Santarelli	Japan Koki Kano; Akira Komata; Ryu Matsumoto; Masaru Yamada	
23/02/2023	Challenge des Pharaons, Cairo	CoM	Foil	Indiv.	(United States) Alexander Massialas	(Italy) Tommaso Marini	(Italy) Davide Filippi (France) Enzo Lefort	
23/02/2023	Challenge des Pharaons, Cairo	CoM	Foil	Team	Japan Kazuki Iimura; Kyosuke Matsuyama; Takahiro Shikine; Kenta Suzumura	Italy Guillaume Bianchi; Daniele Garozzo; Filippo Macchi; Tommaso Marini	France Enzo Lefort; Pierre Loisel; Maxime Pauty; Rafael Savin	
03/03/2023	Trophée Luxardo, Padua	CoM	Sabre	Indiv.	(Italy) Michele Gallo	(Kazakhstan) Artyom Sarkïsyan	(Georgia (country)) Sandro Bazadze (Italy) Giovanni Repetti	
03/03/2023	Trophée Luxardo, Padua	CoM	Sabre	Team	Hungary Tamás Decsi; Csanád Gémesi; András Szatmári; Áron Szilágyi	Italy Luca Curatoli; Michele Gallo; Matteo Neri; Pietro Torre	South Korea Do Gyeong-dong; Gu Bon-gil; Kim Jung-hwan; Kim Jun-ho	
10/03/2023	Grand Prix WESTEND, Budapest	GP	Épée	Indiv.	(Italy) Gabriele Cimini	(Israel) Yonatan Cohen	(France) Gaétan Billa (Italy) Valerio Cuomo	
17/03/2023	Grand Prix, Busan	GP	Foil	Indiv.	(Italy) Alessio Foconi	(Hong Kong) Cheung Ka Long	(United States) Gerek Meinhardt (France) Maxime Pauty	
24/03/2023	Jockey Club Argentino, Buenos Aires	CoM	Épée	Indiv.	(France) Alexandre Bardenet	(China) Lan Minghao	(France) Romain Cannone (United States) Stephen Ewart	
24/03/2023	Jockey Club Argentino, Buenos Aires	CoM	Épée	Team				
24/03/2023	World Cup, Budapest	CoM	Sabre	Indiv.	(Hungary) Áron Szilágyi	(Georgia (country)) Sandro Bazadze	(France) Maxime Pianfetti (South Korea) Gu Bon-gil	
24/03/2023	World Cup, Budapest	CoM	Sabre	Team	South Korea Kim Jung-hwan; Gu Bon-gil; Oh Sang-uk; Kim Jun-ho	Germany Raoul Bonah; Lorenz Kempf; Frederic Kindler; Matyas Szabo	Hungary Tamas Desci; Aron Szilagyi; Csanad Gemesi; Andras Szatmari	
27/04/2023	Grand Prix, Seoul	GP	Sabre	Indiv.	(South Korea) Oh Sang-uk	(Georgia (country)) Sandro Bazadze	(Italy) Matteo Neri (Hungary) Áron Szilágyi	
05/05/2023	World Cup, Acapulco	CoM	Foil	Indiv.	(Egypt) Mohamed Hamza	(Hong Kong) Cheung Ka Long	(Italy) Tommaso Marini (United States) Gerek Meinhardt	
05/05/2023	World Cup, Acapulco	CoM	Foil	Team	United States Miles Chamley-Watson; Nick Itkin; Alexander Massialas; Gerek Meinhardt	Italy Alessio Foconi; Daniele Garozzo; Filippo Macchi; Tommaso Marini	Japan Kyosuke Matsuyama; Kazuki Iimura; Takahiro Shikine; Kenta Suzumura	
05/05/2023	Grand Prix, Cali	GP	Épée	Indiv.	(Czech Republic) Jiří Beran	(Italy) Davide Di Veroli	(Spain) Yulen Pereira (Italy) Federico Vismara	
12/05/2023	Ville de Madrid, Madrid	CoM	Sabre	Indiv.	(Georgia (country)) Sandro Bazadze	(Italy) Riccardo Nuccio	(Italy) Enrico Berrè (France) Maxime Pianfetti	
12/05/2023	Ville de Madrid, Madrid	CoM	Sabre	Team	Hungary Tamas Desci; Aron Szilagyi; Csanad Gemesi; Andras Szatmari	United States Eli Dershwitz; Colin Heathcock; Mitchell Saron; Andrew Doddo	Iran Farzad Baher Arasbaran; Mohammad Fotouhi; Ali Pakdaman; Mohammad Rahbari	
19/05/2023	~~Challenge Monal,~~; ~~Saint-Maur-des-Fossés~~ (Note: French Fencing Federation refused to host the event due to recent decision by FIE to allow Russian and Belarusian athletes compete again.)	CoM	Épée	Indiv.	N/A	N/A	N/A	
19/05/2023	~~Challenge Monal,~~; ~~Saint-Maur-des-Fossés~~	CoM	Épée	Team	N/A	N/A	N/A	
19/05/2023	Grand Prix, Shanghai	GP	Foil	Indiv.	(United States) Alexander Massialas	(Italy) Francesco Ingargiola	(Hungary) Daniel Dosa (France) Julien Mertine	
01/06/2023	Asian Championships, Wuxi	ChZ	Épée	Indiv.				
01/06/2023	Asian Championships, Wuxi	ChZ	Épée	Team				
01/06/2023	Asian Championships, Wuxi	ChZ	Foil	Indiv.				
01/06/2023	Asian Championships, Wuxi	ChZ	Foil	Team				
01/06/2023	Asian Championships, Wuxi	ChZ	Sabre	Indiv.	(Iran) Ali Pakdaman	(South Korea) Kim Jun-ho	(Hong Kong) Ho Tin Low (Iran) Mohammad Rahbari	
01/06/2023	Asian Championships, Wuxi	ChZ	Sabre	Team				
01/06/2023	African Championships, Cairo	ChZ	Épée	Indiv.				
01/06/2023	African Championships, Cairo	ChZ	Épée	Team				
01/06/2023	African Championships, Cairo	ChZ	Foil	Indiv.				
01/06/2023	African Championships, Cairo	ChZ	Foil	Team				
01/06/2023	African Championships, Cairo	ChZ	Sabre	Indiv.				
01/06/2023	African Championships, Cairo	ChZ	Sabre	Team				
01/06/2023	Pan American Championships, Lima	ChZ	Épée	Indiv.				
01/06/2023	Pan American Championships, Lima	ChZ	Épée	Team				
01/06/2023	Pan American Championships, Lima	ChZ	Foil	Indiv.				
01/06/2023	Pan American Championships, Lima	ChZ	Foil	Team				
01/06/2023	Pan American Championships, Lima	ChZ	Sabre	Indiv.	(United States) Andrew Doddo	(Venezuela) Jose Quintero	(Venezuela) Eliecer Romero (Argentina) Pascual Maria Di Tella	
01/06/2023	Pan American Championships, Lima	ChZ	Sabre	Team				
01/06/2023	European Championships, Plovdiv	ChZ	Épée	Indiv.				
01/06/2023	European Championships, Plovdiv	ChZ	Épée	Team				
01/06/2023	European Championships, Plovdiv	ChZ	Foil	Indiv.				
01/06/2023	European Championships, Plovdiv	ChZ	Foil	Team				
01/06/2023	European Championships, Plovdiv	ChZ	Sabre	Indiv.	(Georgia (country)) Sandro Bazadze	(Hungary) András Szatmári	(France) Sebastien Patrice (Turkey) Enver Yildirim	
01/06/2023	European Championships, Plovdiv	ChZ	Sabre	Team				
22/07/2023	World Championships, Milan	ChM	Épée	Indiv.	(Hungary) Máté Tamás Koch	(Italy) Davide Di Veroli	(France) Romain Cannone (Kazakhstan) Ruslan Kurbanov	
22/07/2023	World Championships, Milan	ChM	Épée	Team	Italy Tamas Desci; Aron Szilagyi; Csanad Gemesi; Andras Szatmari	France Tamas Desci; Aron Szilagyi; Csanad Gemesi; Andras Szatmari	Venezuela Tamas Desci; Aron Szilagyi; Csanad Gemesi; Andras Szatmari	
22/07/2023	World Championships, Milan	ChM	Foil	Indiv.	(Italy) Tommaso Marini	(United States) Nick Itkin	(Japan) Kyosuke Matsuyama (France) Enzo Lefort	
22/07/2023	World Championships, Milan	ChM	Foil	Team	Japan Kazuki Iimura; Kyosuke Matsuyama; Takahiro Shikine; Kenta Suzumura	China Chen Haiwei; Mo Ziwei; Wu Bin; Xu Jie	Hong Kong Cheung Ka Long; Ryan Choi; Leung Chin Yu; Yeung Chi Ka	
22/07/2023	World Championships, Milan	ChM	Sabre	Indiv.	(United States) Eli Dershwitz	(Georgia (country)) Sandro Bazadze	(Egypt) Ziad El-Sissy (Hungary) Áron Szilágyi	
22/07/2023	World Championships, Milan	ChM	Sabre	Team	Hungary Tamás Decsi; Csanád Gémesi; András Szatmári; Áron Szilágyi	South Korea Gu Bon-gil; Ha Han-sol; Kim Jun-ho; Oh Sang-uk	United States Eli Dershwitz; Andrew Doddo; Colin Heathcock; Mitchell Saron	

== Overall rankings ==
=== Épée ===
==== Women ====
Individual ranking after 4 events
Rank	Name	Points
1	(South Korea) Choi In-jeong	191
2	(South Korea) Song Se-ra	191
3	(Hong Kong) Vivian Kong	178
4	(Italy) Rossella Fiamingo	151
5	(Italy) Alberta Santuccio	146
6	(Hungary) Anna Kun	138
7	(France) Marie-Florence Candassamy	135
8	(France) Auriane Mallo	115
9	(Brazil) Nathalie Moellhausen	113
10	(Kenya) Alexandra Ndolo	112

Team ranking after 3 events
Rank	Name	Points
1	South Korea	424
2	Italy	332
3	France	304
4	Poland	267
5	United States	246

==== Men ====
Individual ranking after 1 event
Rank	Name	Points
1	(France) Romain Cannone	183
2	(France) Yannick Borel	168
3	(Japan) Koki Kano	125
4	(Ukraine) Ihor Reizlin	125
5	(Hungary) Mate Tamas Koch	123
6	(Venezuela) Rubén Limardo	116
7	(Kazakhstan) Ruslan Kurbanov	114
8	(Japan) Kazuyasu Minobe	114
9	(Italy) Frederico Vismara	108
10	(France) Nelson Lopez-Pourtier	107

Team ranking after 1 event
Rank	Name	Points
1	France	376
2	South Korea	302
3	Italy	293
4	Hungary	280
5	Japan	245

=== Foil ===
==== Women ====
Individual ranking after 0 events
Rank	Name	Points
1	(United States) Lee Kiefer	228
2	(Italy) Alice Volpi	170
3	(Canada) Eleanor Harvey	149
4	(France) Ysaora Thibus	145
5	(Italy) Arianna Errigo	135
6	(Italy) Francesca Palumbo	116
7	(Germany) Leonie Ebert	101
8	(Germany) Anne Sauer	96
9	(China) Chen Qingyuan	96
10	(Canada) Jessica Guo	95

Team ranking after 0 events
Rank	Name	Points
1	Italy	412
2	United States	344
3	Japan	316
4	France	312
5	Canada	250

==== Men ====
Individual ranking after 1 event
Rank	Name	Points
1	(Italy) Tommaso Marini	197
2	(Italy) Alessio Foconi	143
3	(France) Enzo Lefort	128
4	(Italy) Daniele Garozzo	116
5	(Egypt) Alaaeldin Abouelkassem	114
6	(Hong Kong) Cheung Ka Long	113
7	(United States) Nick Itkin	104
8	(Egypt) Mohamed Hamza	92
9	(Hong Kong) Ryan Choi	25
10	(Czech Republic) Alexander Choupenitch	

Team ranking after 1 event
Rank	Name	Points
1	Italy	412
2	United States	362
3	France	296
4	Japan	266
5	Egypt	226

=== Sabre ===
==== Women ====
Individual ranking after 1 event
Rank	Name	Points
1	(Azerbaijan) Anna Bashta	235
2	(Japan) Misaki Emura	208
3	(Greece) Déspina Georgiádou	174
4	(Spain) Lucia Martin-Portugues	141
5	(Greece) Theodora Gkountoura	116
6	(Italy) Rossella Gregorio	107
7	(France) Sara Balzer	106
8	(France) Manon Apithy-Brunet	103
9	(Spain) Araceli Navarro	98
10	(South Korea) Choi Soo-yeon	95

Team ranking after 1 event
Rank	Name	Points
1	France	364
2	South Korea	308
3	Italy	300
4	Hungary	300
5	Japan	294

==== Men ====
Individual ranking after 1 event
Rank	Name	Points
1	(Hungary) Áron Szilágyi	178
2	(Georgia (country)) Sandro Bazadze	175
3	(South Korea) Oh Sang-uk	151
4	(Italy) Luca Curatoli	151
5	(South Korea) Kim Jung-hwan	132
6	(France) Maxime Pianfetti	119
7	(Romania) Iulian Teodosiu	116
8	(France) Boladé Apithy	114
9	(South Korea) Gu Bon-gil	108
10	(United States) Daryl Homer	91

Team ranking after 1 event
Rank	Name	Points
1	South Korea	352
2	Hungary	314
3	France	220
4	Germany	218
5	Italy	208

== See also ==
- Fencing at the 2024 Summer Olympics – Qualification
