= Fencing at the 2020 Summer Olympics – Men's foil =

Fencing at the Olympics

Men's foil at the Games of the XXXII Olympiad
- Olympic fencing
- Venue: Makuhari Messe
- Date: 26 July 2021
- Competitors: 36 from 18 nations

Medalists
| 1st place, gold medalist(s) | | Cheung Ka Long | Hong Kong |
| 2nd place, silver medalist(s) | | Daniele Garozzo | Italy |
| 3rd place, bronze medalist(s) | | Alexander Choupenitch | Czech Republic |

The men's foil event at the 2020 Summer Olympics took place on 26 July 2021 at the Makuhari Messe. 36 fencers from 18 nations competed in this event.

== Background ==
This was the 28th appearance of the event, which has been held at every Summer Olympics except 1908 (when there was a foil display only rather than a medal event).

The reigning Olympic champion was Daniele Garozzo of Italy. The reigning World Champion was Enzo Lefort of France.

== Qualification ==
A National Olympic Committee (NOC) could enter up to 3 qualified fencers in the men's foil. Nations were limited to three fencers each from 1928 to 2004. However, the 2008 Games introduced a rotation of men's team fencing events with one weapon left off each Games; the individual event without a corresponding team event had the number of fencers per nation reduced to two. Men's foil was the first event this applied to, so each nation could enter a maximum of two fencers in the event in 2008. Foil would have been affected by this system again in 2020, but the 2020 Games eliminated this rotation and all weapons had team events.

There are 34 dedicated quota spots for men's foil. The first 24 spots go to the 3 members of each of the 8 qualified teams in the team foil event. Next, 6 more men are selected from the world rankings based on continents: 2 from Europe, 1 from the Americas, 2 from Asia/Oceania, and 1 from Africa. Finally, 4 spots are allocated by continental qualifying events: 1 from Europe, 1 from the Americas, 1 from Asia/Oceania, and 1 from Africa. Each nation can earn only one spot through rankings or events.

Additionally, there are 8 host/invitational spots that can be spread throughout the various fencing events. Japan has used 2 host places to complete a men's foil team (it had 1 place through individual qualifying).

The COVID-19 pandemic delayed many of the events for qualifying for fencing, moving the close of the rankings period back to April 5, 2021, rather than the original April 4, 2020. All of the events that are considered for the men's team foil rankings had been finished before the pandemic caused postponements, however, so the men's teams were known over a year before the event. This meant that the NOCs qualifying 3 fencers for the individual event were known as well: the United States, France, Italy, Russia, Hong Kong, Egypt, Canada, and Germany. The remaining 10 spots based on rankings and continental events remain open until April 2020, as well as whether Japan will use host places in the men's foil (and how many).

== Competition format ==
The 1996 tournament had vastly simplified the competition format into a single-elimination bracket, with a bronze medal match. The 2020 tournament will continue to use that format. Fencing is done to 15 touches or to the completion of three three-minute rounds if neither fencer reaches 15 touches by then. At the end of time, the higher-scoring fencer is the winner; a tie results in an additional one-minute sudden-death time period. This sudden-death period is further modified by the selection of a draw-winner beforehand; if neither fencer scores a touch during the minute, the predetermined draw-winner wins the bout. Standard foil rules regarding target area, striking, and priority are used.

== Schedule ==
The competition is held over a single day, Monday, 26 July. The first session runs from 9 a.m. to approximately 4:20 p.m. (when the quarterfinals are expected to conclude), after which there is a break until 6 p.m. before the semifinals and medal bouts are held. Men's foil bouts alternate with the women's sabre event bouts.

All times are Japan Standard Time (UTC+9)

| Date | Time | Round |
|---|---|---|
| Monday, 26 July 2021 | 9:00 18:00 | Round of 64; Round of 32; Round of 16; Quarterfinals; Semifinals; Bronze medal match Final |

== Results ==
=== Finals ===
Semifinals
Takahiro Shikine (JPN) | 9
Daniele Garozzo (ITA) | 15
Alexander Choupenitch (CZE) | 10
Cheung Ka-long (HKG) | 15

Final
Daniele Garozzo (ITA) | 11
Cheung Ka-long (HKG) | 15
Bronze medal bout
Takahiro Shikine (JPN) | 8
Alexander Choupenitch (CZE) | 15

=== Top half ===
==== Piste Blue ====
Round of 64
Vladislav Mylnikov (ROC) | 15
Salim Heroui (ALG) | 6

Round of 32
Gerek Meinhardt (USA) | 11
Vladislav Mylnikov (ROC) | 15
Benjamin Kleibrink (GER) | 11
Alaaeldin Abouelkassem (EGY) | 15
Takahiro Shikine (JPN) | 15
Mohamed Samandi (TUN) | 4
Maximilien Van Haaster (CAN) | 10
Ryan Choi (HKG) | 15

Round of 16
Vladislav Mylnikov (ROC) | 12
Alaaeldin Abouelkassem (EGY) | 15
Takahiro Shikine (JPN) | 15
Ryan Choi (HKG) | 6

Quarterfinals
Alaaeldin Abouelkassem (EGY) | 13
Takahiro Shikine (JPN) | 15

==== Piste Yellow ====
Round of 64
Huang Mengkai (CHN) | 14
Diego Cervantes (MEX) | 15

Round of 32
Daniele Garozzo (ITA) | 15
Mohamed Hassan (EGY) | 6
Kyosuke Matsuyama (JPN) | 15
Maxime Pauty (FRA) | 7
Guilherme Toldo (BRA) | 10
Toshiya Saito (JPN) | 15
Diego Cervantes (MEX) | 11
Enzo Lefort (FRA) | 15

Round of 16
Daniele Garozzo (ITA) | 15
Kyosuke Matsuyama (JPN) | 14
Toshiya Saito (JPN) | 4
Enzo Lefort (FRA) | 15

Quarterfinals
Daniele Garozzo (ITA) | 15
Enzo Lefort (FRA) | 10

=== Bottom half ===
==== Piste Green ====
Round of 64
Alex Cai (CAN) | 12
Peter Joppich (GER) | 15

Round of 32
Alexander Massialas (USA) | 12
Peter Joppich (GER) | 15
Alexander Choupenitch (CZE) | 15
Carlos Llavador (ESP) | 11
Marcus Mepstead (GBR) | 13
Mohamed Hamza (EGY) | 15
Eli Schenkel (CAN) | 11
Andrea Cassarà (ITA) | 15

Round of 16
Peter Joppich (GER) | 13
Alexander Choupenitch (CZE) | 15
Mohamed Hamza (EGY) | 15
Andrea Cassarà (ITA) | 13

Quarterfinals
Alexander Choupenitch (CZE) | 15
Mohamed Hamza (EGY) | 9

==== Piste Red ====
Round of 64
Cheung Siu Lun (HKG) | 14
André Sanità (GER) | 15

Round of 32
Nick Itkin (USA) | 15
Anton Borodachev (ROC) | 11
Kirill Borodachev (ROC) | 15
Lee Kwang-hyun (KOR) | 14
Cheung Ka-long (HKG) | 15
Julien Mertine (FRA) | 12
André Sanità (GER) | 8
Alessio Foconi (ITA) | 15

Round of 16
Nick Itkin (USA) | 13
Kirill Borodachev (ROC) | 15
Cheung Ka-long (HKG) | 15
Alessio Foconi (ITA) | 3

Quarterfinals
Kirill Borodachev (ROC) | 14
Cheung Ka-long (HKG) | 15
