= Fencing at the 2024 Summer Olympics – Men's foil =

Men's foil at the Games of the XXXIII Olympiad
- Olympic fencing
- Venue: Grand Palais strip
- Date: 29 July 2024
- Competitors: 37 from 21 nations

Medalists
1st place, gold medalist(s)		Cheung Ka Long	Hong Kong
2nd place, silver medalist(s)		Filippo Macchi	Italy
3rd place, bronze medalist(s)		Nick Itkin	United States

The men's foil event at the 2024 Summer Olympics took place on 29 July 2024 at the Grand Palais strip.

Cheung Ka Long defended his 2020 title, becoming a two-time Olympic Champion.

== Background ==
This was the 29th appearance of the event, which has been held at every Summer Olympics since being introduced in 1896, with the exception of 1908. Cheung Ka Long was the defending champion, and he has successfully defended his title, becoming the third male foil fencer to achieve this feat after the 1912 and 1920 champion Nedo Nadi and the 1952 and 1956 champion Christian d'Oriola.

== Competition format ==
The 1996 tournament had vastly simplified the competition format into a single-elimination bracket, with a bronze medal match. The 2024 tournament continued to use that format. Fencing was done to 15 touches or to the completion of three three-minute rounds if neither fencer reaches 15 touches by then. At the end of time, the higher-scoring fencer was the winner; a tie resulted in an additional one-minute sudden-death time period. This sudden-death period was further modified by the selection of a draw-winner beforehand; if neither fencer scored a touch during the minute, the predetermined draw-winner won the bout. Standard foil rules regarding target area, striking, and priority were used.

== Schedule ==
The competition was held over a single day, Monday, 29 July. Men's foil bouts alternate with the women's sabre event bouts.

All times use Central European Summer Time (UTC+2)

Date	Time	Round
Monday, 29 July 2024	9:25; 12:05; 14:55; 16:20; 19:50; 21:15	Round of 64; Round of 32; Round of 16; Quarterfinals; Semifinals; Finals

== Results ==
=== Finals ===
Semifinals
Kazuki Iimura (JPN)	11
Cheung Ka Long (HKG)	15
Filippo Macchi (ITA)	15
Nick Itkin (USA)	11

Final
Cheung Ka Long (HKG)	15
Filippo Macchi (ITA)	14
Bronze medal bout
Kazuki Iimura (JPN)	12
Nick Itkin (USA)	15

=== Top half ===
==== Section 1 ====
Round of 64
Kruz Schembri (ISV)	8
Blake Broszus (CAN)	15

Round of 32
Tommaso Marini (ITA)	15
Blake Broszus (CAN)	9
Maxime Pauty (FRA)	15
Takahiro Shikine (JPN)	9
Kazuki Iimura (JPN)	15
Alaaeldin Abouelkassem (EGY)	8
Jérémy Keryhuel (CIV)	3
Alexander Massialas (USA)	15

Round of 16
Tommaso Marini (ITA)	14
Maxime Pauty (FRA)	15
Kazuki Iimura (JPN)	15
Alexander Massialas (USA)	8

Quarterfinals
Maxime Pauty (FRA)	14
Kazuki Iimura (JPN)	15

==== Section 2 ====
Round of 64
Philippe Wakim (LBN)	13
Chen Yi-tung (TPE)	15
Victor Alvares de Oliveira (CPV)	9
Daniel Gu (CAN)	15

Round of 32
Enzo Lefort (FRA)	15
Chen Yi-tung (TPE)	12
Chen Haiwei (CHN)	7
Gerek Meinhardt (USA)	15
Mo Ziwei (CHN)	15
Guilherme Toldo (BRA)	7
Daniel Gu (CAN)	5
Cheung Ka Long (HKG)	15

Round of 16
Enzo Lefort (FRA)	15
Gerek Meinhardt (USA)	10
Mo Ziwei (CHN)	10
Cheung Ka Long (HKG)	15

Quarterfinals
Enzo Lefort (FRA)	14
Cheung Ka Long (HKG)	15

=== Bottom half ===
==== Section 3 ====
Round of 64
Salim Heroui (ALG)	8
Jan Jurkiewicz (POL)	15

Round of 32
Mohamed Hamza (EGY)	15
Jan Jurkiewicz (POL)	14
Ha Tae-gyu (KOR)	13
Carlos Llavador (ESP)	15
Filippo Macchi (ITA)	15
Xu Jie (CHN)	10
Julien Mertine (FRA)	6
Kyosuke Matsuyama (JPN)	15

Round of 16
Mohamed Hamza (EGY)	15
Carlos Llavador (ESP)	12
Filippo Macchi (ITA)	15
Kyosuke Matsuyama (JPN)	11

Quarterfinals
Mohamed Hamza (EGY)	9
Filippo Macchi (ITA)	15

==== Section 4 ====
Round of 64
Adrian Wojtkowiak (POL)	10
Alex Tofalides (CYP)	15

Round of 32
Alexander Choupenitch (CZE)	15
Michał Siess (POL)	3
Maximilien Van Haaster (CAN)	4
Guillaume Bianchi (ITA)	15
Dániel Dósa (HUN)	14
Abdelrahman Tolba (EGY)	15
Alex Tofalides (CYP)	10
Nick Itkin (USA)	15

Round of 16
Alexander Choupenitch (CZE)	5
Guillaume Bianchi (ITA)	15
Abdelrahman Tolba (EGY)	8
Nick Itkin (USA)	15

Quarterfinals
Guillaume Bianchi (ITA)	14
Nick Itkin (USA)	15
