= Fencing at the 2020 Summer Olympics – Men's team foil =

Men's team foil at the Games of the XXXII Olympiad
- Olympic fencing
- Venue: Makuhari Messe
- Date: 1 August 2021
- Competitors: 35 from 9 nations

Medalists
1st place, gold medalist(s)		Erwann Le Péchoux; Enzo Lefort; Julien Mertine; Maxime Pauty	France
2nd place, silver medalist(s)		Anton Borodachev; Kirill Borodachev; Vladislav Mylnikov; Timur Safin	ROC
3rd place, bronze medalist(s)		Race Imboden; Nick Itkin; Alexander Massialas; Gerek Meinhardt	United States

The men's team foil event at the 2020 Summer Olympics took place on 1 August 2021 at the Makuhari Messe. 27 fencers (9 teams of 3) from 9 nations are expected to compete.

== Background ==
This will be the 24th appearance of the event. It was first held in 1904, but omitted in 1908 (when no foil medal events were held) and 1912 (when it was the only one of the six possible men's events not included). The men's team foil returned in 1920 and has been held at every Summer Olympics since 1920 except 2008 (during the time when team events were rotated off the schedule, with only two of the three weapons for each of the men's and women's categories).

The reigning Olympic champion is Russia (Aleksey Cheremisinov, Artur Akhmatkhuzin, and Timur Safin). The reigning World Champion is the United States (Miles Chamley-Watson, Race Imboden, Alexander Massialas, and Gerek Meinhardt). A preview from Olympics.com identified 2016 individual gold medalist Daniele Garozzo as the leader of a strong Italian team that will compete with the United States (especially 2016 silver medalist Massialas) and France (especially 2019 individual World Champion Enzo Lefort) for the team and individual medals in foil.

== Qualification ==
A National Olympic Committee (NOC) could enter a team of 3 fencers in the men's team foil. These fencers also automatically qualified for the individual event.

There are 8 dedicated quota spots for men's team foil. They are allocated as through the world team ranking list of 5 April 2021. The top 4 spots, regardless of geographic zone, qualify (United States, France, Italy, and ROC). The next four spots are allocated to separate geographic zones, as long as an NOC from that zone is in the top 16. These places went to Hong Kong (Asia/Oceania), Canada (Americas), Egypt (Africa), and Germany (Europe).

Additionally, there are 8 host/invitational spots that can be spread throughout the various fencing events. Japan qualified one men's foil fencer through normal individual qualification and used two host quota places to complete a men's foil team.

The COVID-19 pandemic delayed many of the events for qualifying for fencing, moving the close of the rankings period back to April 5, 2021 rather than the original April 4, 2020.

== Competition format ==
The 2020 tournament is a single-elimination tournament, with classification matches for all places. Each match features the three fencers on each team competing in a round-robin, with 9 three-minute bouts to 5 points; the winning team is the one that reaches 45 total points first or is leading after the end of the nine bouts. Standard foil rules regarding target area, striking, and priority are used.

== Schedule ==
The competition is held over a single day, Sunday, 1 August. The first session runs from 9 a.m. to approximately 4 p.m. (when all matches except the bronze and gold medal finals are expected to conclude), after which there is a break until 6:30 p.m. before the medal bouts are held.

All times are Japan Standard Time (UTC+9)

Date	Time	Round
Sunday, 1 August 2021	9:00 18:30	Round of 16; Quarterfinals; Semifinals; Classification 7/8; Classification 5/6; Bronze medal match Gold medal match

== Results ==
Round of 16
Canada	31
Germany	45

Quarter-finals
United States	45
Germany	36
Hong Kong	39
ROC	45
Italy	43
Japan	45
Egypt	34
France	45

Semi-finals
United States	41
ROC	45
Japan	42
France	45

Final
ROC	28
France	45
Bronze medal bout
United States	45
Japan	31

5–8th place classification

5–8th place semifinals
Germany	45
Hong Kong	38
Italy	45
Egypt	30

Fifth place bout
Germany
Italy	WD
Seventh place bout
Hong Kong	45
Egypt	21

== Final classification ==
Rank	Team	Athlete
1st place, gold medalist(s)	France	Erwann Le Péchoux; Enzo Lefort; Julien Mertine; Maxime Pauty
2nd place, silver medalist(s)	ROC	Anton Borodachev; Kirill Borodachev; Vladislav Mylnikov; Timur Safin
3rd place, bronze medalist(s)	United States	Race Imboden; Nick Itkin; Alexander Massialas; Gerek Meinhardt
4	Japan	Kyosuke Matsuyama; Yudai Nagano; Toshiya Saito; Takahiro Shikine
5	Italy	Giorgio Avola; Andrea Cassarà; Alessio Foconi; Daniele Garozzo
6	Germany	Peter Joppich; Benjamin Kleibrink; Luis Klein; André Sanità
7	Hong Kong	Cheung Ka-long; Cheung Siu Lun; Ryan Choi; Lawrence Ng
8	Egypt	Alaaeldin Abouelkassem; Mohamed Hamza; Mohamed Hassan; Youssef Sanaa
9	Canada	Blake Broszus; Alex Cai; Maximilien Van Haaster
