= 2024 European Fencing Championships =

- Host city: (Switzerland) Basel
- Dates: 18–23 June
- Main venue: St. Jakobshalle

The 2024 European Fencing Championships was a fencing competition that took place from 18 to 23 June 2024 in Basel, Switzerland.

== Schedule ==
●	Opening Ceremony	●	Finals	●	Closing Ceremony

June	18	19	20	21	22	23	Total
Ceremonies	●					●	
Foil Individual	Men	Women					2
Épée Individual	Women		Men				2
Sabre Individual		Men	Women				2
Foil Team				Men		Women	2
Épée Team				Women	Men		2
Sabre Team					Women	Men	2
Total Gold Medals	2	2	2	2	2	2	12

== Medal summary ==
=== Men's events ===
Event	Gold	Silver	Bronze
Foil	Tommaso Marini; Italy	Alessio Foconi; Italy	Maxime Pauty; France
Foil	Tommaso Marini; Italy	Alessio Foconi; Italy	Alexander Choupenitch; Czech Republic
Épée	Luidgi Midelton; France	Gergely Siklósi; Hungary	Ian Hauri; Switzerland
Épée	Luidgi Midelton; France	Gergely Siklósi; Hungary	Tibor Andrásfi; Hungary
Sabre	Michele Gallo; Italy	Luca Curatoli; Italy	Jean-Philippe Patrice; France
Sabre	Michele Gallo; Italy	Luca Curatoli; Italy	Luigi Samele; Italy
Team Foil	France; Maximilien Chastanet; Enzo Lefort; Julien Mertine; Maxime Pauty	Hungary; Dániel Dósa; Andor Mihályi; Gergő Szemes; Gergely Tóth	Italy; Guillaume Bianchi; Alessio Foconi; Filippo Macchi; Tommaso Marini
Team Épée	France; Paul Allègre; Alexandre Bardenet; Romain Cannone; Luidgi Midelton	Italy; Gabriele Cimini; Davide Di Veroli; Andrea Santarelli; Federico Vismara	Spain; Eugeni Gavaldà; Gerard Gonell; Yulen Pereira; Juan Pedro Romero
Team Sabre	Hungary; Tamás Decsi; Csanád Gémesi; Krisztián Rabb; Áron Szilágyi	Romania; Matei Cîdu; Vlad Covaliu; Radu Niţu; Răzvan Ursachi	Turkey; Tolga Aslan; Muhammed Furkan Kalender; Furkan Yaman; Enver Yıldırım

=== Women's events ===
Event	Gold	Silver	Bronze
Foil	Arianna Errigo; Italy	Dariia Myroniuk; Ukraine	Carolina Stutchbury; Great Britain
Foil	Arianna Errigo; Italy	Dariia Myroniuk; Ukraine	Julia Walczyk-Klimaszyk; Poland
Épée	Irina Embrich; Estonia	Auriane Mallo; France	Alberta Santuccio; Italy
Épée	Irina Embrich; Estonia	Auriane Mallo; France	Angeline Favre; Switzerland
Sabre	Celia Pérez; Spain	Liza Pusztai; Hungary	Zuzanna Cieślar; Poland
Sabre	Celia Pérez; Spain	Liza Pusztai; Hungary	Araceli Navarro; Spain
Team Foil	Italy; Arianna Errigo; Martina Favaretto; Francesca Palumbo; Alice Volpi	Poland; Martyna Jelińska; Hanna Łyczbińska; Martyna Synoradzka; Julia Walczyk-Klimaszyk	Hungary; Kata Kondricz; Dóra Lupkovics; Aida Mohamed; Flóra Pásztor
Team Épée	Italy; Rossella Fiamingo; Mara Navarria; Giulia Rizzi; Alberta Santuccio	Hungary; Kinga Dékány; Tamara Gnám; Eszter Muhari; Blanka Nagy	France; Marie-Florence Candassamy; Alexandra Louis-Marie; Auriane Mallo-Breton; Coraline Vitalis
Team Sabre	France; Cécilia Berder; Manon Brunet; Sarah Noutcha; Caroline Queroli	Ukraine; Yuliya Bakastova; Olga Kharlan; Alina Komashchuk; Olena Kravatska	Spain; Elena Hernández; Lucía Martín-Portugués; Araceli Navarro; Celia Pérez

=== Medal table ===
* Host nation (Switzerland)

Rank	Nation	Gold	Silver	Bronze	Total
1	Italy	5	3	3	11
2	France	4	1	3	8
3	Hungary	1	4	2	7
4	Spain	1	0	3	4
5	Estonia	1	0	0	1
6	Ukraine	0	2	0	2
7	Poland	0	1	2	3
8	Romania	0	1	0	1
9	Switzerland*	0	0	2	2
10	Czech Republic	0	0	1	1
10	Great Britain	0	0	1	1
10	Turkey	0	0	1	1
Totals (12 entries)		12	12	18	42

== Results ==
=== Men ===
==== Foil individual ====
Position	Name	Country
1st place, gold medalist(s)	Tommaso Marini	Italy
2nd place, silver medalist(s)	Alessio Foconi	Italy
3rd place, bronze medalist(s)	Maxime Pauty	France
3rd place, bronze medalist(s)	Alexander Choupenitch	Czech Republic
5.	Guillaume Bianchi	Italy
6.	Alexander Kahl	Germany
7.	Maximilien Chastanet	France
8.	Leszek Rajski	Poland

Round of 16
32	(Spain) Ignacio Breteau	4
16	(Italy) Alessio Foconi	15
24	(United Kingdom) David Sosnov	13
8	(Germany) Alexander Kahl	15
5	(France) Maxime Pauty	15
12	(United Kingdom) Jaimie Cook	6
19	(Hungary) Gergő Szemes	4
4	(Italy) Guillaume Bianchi	15
35	(Hungary) Andor Mihályi	11
46	(Poland) Leszek Rajski	15
11	(Italy) Tommaso Marini	15
27	(Israel) Raz Goren	8
26	(Belgium) Stef van Campenhout	3
10	(France) Maximilien Chastanet	15
15	(Italy) Filippo Macchi	13
2	(Czech Republic) Alexander Choupenitch	15

Quarter-finals
16	(Italy) Alessio Foconi	15
8	(Germany) Alexander Kahl	8
5	(France) Maxime Pauty	15
4	(Italy) Guillaume Bianchi	13
46	(Poland) Leszek Rajski	14
11	(Italy) Tommaso Marini	15
10	(France) Maximilien Chastanet	14
2	(Czech Republic) Alexander Choupenitch	15

Semi-finals
16	(Italy) Alessio Foconi	15
5	(France) Maxime Pauty	7
11	(Italy) Tommaso Marini	15
2	(Czech Republic) Alexander Choupenitch	11

Final
16	(Italy) Alessio Foconi	4
6	(Italy) Tommaso Marini	15

==== Épée individual ====
Position	Name	Country
1st place, gold medalist(s)	Luidgi Middleton	France
2nd place, silver medalist(s)	Gergely Siklósi	Hungary
3rd place, bronze medalist(s)	Ian Hauri	Switzerland
3rd place, bronze medalist(s)	Tibor Andrásfi	Hungary
5.	Máté Tamás Koch	Hungary
6.	Alexis Bayard	Switzerland
7.	Yulen Pereira	Spain
8.	Damian Michalak	Poland

Round of 16
32	(Switzerland) Ian Hauri	15
16	(Ukraine) Roman Svichkar	5
9	(United Kingdom) Alec Brooke	11
24	(Spain) Yulen Pereira	15
5	(Czech Republic) Martin Rubeš	14
52	(Poland) Damian Michalak	15
53	(France) Luidgi Midelton	15
61	(Germany) Marco Brinkmann	4
3	(Israel) Yuval Freilich	11
14	(Switzerland) Alexis Bayard	15
43	(Spain) Juan Pedro Romero	13
27	(Hungary) Gergely Siklósi	15
7	(Hungary) Máté Tamás Koch	15
10	(Israel) Alon Sarid	10
47	(Hungary) Tibor Andrásfi	15
34	(Austria) Josef Mahringer	12

Quarter-finals
32	(Switzerland) Ian Hauri	15
24	(Spain) Yulen Pereira	9
52	(Poland) Damian Michalak	6
53	(France) Luidgi Midelton	15
14	(Switzerland) Alexis Bayard	11
27	(Hungary) Gergely Siklósi	15
7	(Hungary) Máté Tamás Koch	9
47	(Hungary) Tibor Andrásfi	10

Semi-finals
32	(Switzerland) Ian Hauri	7
53	(France) Luidgi Midelton	15
27	(Hungary) Gergely Siklósi	15
47	(Hungary) Tibor Andrásfi	8

Final
53	(France) Luidgi Midelton	15
27	(Hungary) Gergely Siklósi	3

==== Sabre individual ====
Position	Name	Country
1st place, gold medalist(s)	Michele Gallo	Italy
2nd place, silver medalist(s)	Luca Curatoli	Italy
3rd place, bronze medalist(s)	Luigi Samele	Italy
3rd place, bronze medalist(s)	Jean-Philippe Patrice	France
5.	Bolade Apithy	France
6.	Maxime Pianfetti	France
7.	George Dragomir	Romania
8.	Sébastien Patrice	France

Round of 16
1	(Italy) Luca Curatoli	15
17	(Romania) Razvan Ursachi	11
9	(France) Maxime Pianfetti	15
25	(Poland) Krzysztof Kaczkowski	5
28	(Turkey) Enver Yildirim	11
12	(Romania) George Dragomir	15
13	(Italy) Luigi Samele	15
3	(Georgia (country)) Sandro Bazadze	12
3	(France) Bolade Apithy	15
14	(Hungary) Csanád Gémesi	9
11	(Hungary) Krisztián Rabb	3
6	(Italy) Michele Gallo	15
7	(France) Jean-Philippe Patrice	15
21	(Georgia (country)) Beka Bazazde	4
15	(France) Sébastien Patrice	15
2	(Germany) Matyas Szabo	13

Quarter-finals
1	(Italy) Luca Curatoli	15
9	(France) Maxime Pianfetti	10
12	(Romania) George Dragomir	5
13	(Italy) Luigi Samele	15
3	(France) Bolade Apithy	10
6	(Italy) Michele Gallo	15
7	(France) Jean-Philippe Patrice	15
15	(France) Sébastien Patrice	14

Semi-finals
1	(Italy) Luca Curatoli	15
13	(Italy) Luigi Samele	3
6	(Italy) Michele Gallo	15
7	(France) Jean-Philippe Patrice	6

Final
1	(Italy) Luca Curatoli	10
6	(Italy) Michele Gallo	15

==== Foil team ====
Round of 16
Spain	36
Belgium	45
Hungary	45
Turkey	17
Israel	25
Great Britain	45
Ukraine	17
Austria	45

Quarter-finals
Italy	45
Belgium	28
Hungary	45
Germany	27
Poland	38
Great Britain	35
Austria	30
France	36

Semi-finals
Italy	43
Hungary	44
Poland	29
France	45

Final
Hungary	30
France	45
Third place
Italy	45
Poland	25

==== Épée team ====
Round of 16
France	45
Great Britain	31
Poland	31
Germany	39
Switzerland	41
Netherlands	42
Finland	32
Czech Republic	45
Hungary	33
Estonia	25
Austria	38
Spain	45
Ukraine	45
Israel	31
Denmark	41
Italy	45

Quarter-finals
France	45
Germany	31
Netherlands	38
Czech Republic	45
Hungary	31
Spain	45
Ukraine	36
Italy	40

Semi-finals
France	45
Czech Republic	33
Spain	30
Italy	43

Final
France	45
Italy	24
Third place
Czech Republic	32
Spain	43

==== Sabre team ====
Round of 16
Poland	26
Georgia	45
Ukraine	45
Iceland	29
Switzerland	13
Romania	45
Spain	43
Turkey	45

Quarter-finals
Hungary	45
Georgia	39
Ukraine	41
Germany	45
Italy	37
Romania	45
Turkey	45
France	38

Semi-finals
Hungary	45
Germany	32
Romania	45
Turkey	44

Final
Hungary	45
Romania	40
Third place
Germany	42
Turkey	45

=== Women ===
==== Foil individual ====
Position	Name	Country
1st place, gold medalist(s)	Arianna Errigo	Italy
2nd place, silver medalist(s)	Dariia Myroniuk	Ukraine
3rd place, bronze medalist(s)	Julia Walczyk-Klimaszyk	Poland
3rd place, bronze medalist(s)	Carolina Stutchbury	Great Britain
5.	Alina Poloziuk	Ukraine
6.	Eva Lacheray	France
7.	Martina Favaretto	Italy
8.	Kata Kondricz	Hungary

Round of 16
1	(Italy) Arianna Errigo	15
16	(Germany) Leandra Behr	1
9	(Spain) Maria Marino	12
8	(Italy) Martina Favaretto	15
5	(Italy) Martina Batini	3
20	(United Kingdom) Carolina Stutchbury	15
13	(Austria) Lilli Maria Brugger	11
4	(France) Eva Lacheray	12
3	(Ukraine) Alina Poloziuk	15
27	(Italy) Alice Volpi	14
11	(Ukraine) Dariia Myroniuk	15
27	(Austria) Olivia Wohlgemuth	11
6	(France) Pauline Ranvier	11
10	(Poland) Julia Walczyk-Klimaszyk	15
15	(Hungary) Kata Kondricz	15
31	(Spain) Maria Teresa Díaz	10

Quarter-finals
1	(Italy) Arianna Errigo	15
8	(Italy) Martina Favaretto	9
20	(United Kingdom) Carolina Stutchbury	15
4	(France) Eva Lacheray	8
3	(Ukraine) Alina Poloziuk	13
11	(Ukraine) Dariia Myroniuk	15
10	(Poland) Julia Walczyk-Klimaszyk	15
15	(Hungary) Kata Kondricz	8

Semi-finals
1	(Italy) Arianna Errigo	15
20	(United Kingdom) Carolina Stutchbury	14
11	(Ukraine) Dariia Myroniuk	15
10	(Poland) Julia Walczyk-Klimaszyk	11

Final
1	(Italy) Arianna Errigo	15
11	(Ukraine) Dariia Myroniuk	10

==== Épée individual ====
Position	Name	Country
1st place, gold medalist(s)	Irina Embrich	Estonia
2nd place, silver medalist(s)	Auriane Mallo	France
3rd place, bronze medalist(s)	Alberta Santuccio	Italy
3rd place, bronze medalist(s)	Angeline Favre	Switzerland
5.	Vlada Kharkova	Ukraine
6.	Coraline Vitalis	France
7.	Aleksandra Jarecka	Poland
8.	Marie-Florence Candassamy	France

Round of 16
1	(Ukraine) Vlada Kharkova	11
17	(Switzerland) Angela Krieger	10
24	(Switzerland) Angeline Favre	15
57	(Latvia) Sofija Prosina	13
28	(Poland) Martyna Swatowska-Wenglarczyk	6
12	(France) Auriane Mallo	15
13	(France) Marie-Florence Candassamy	15
29	(Poland) Renata Knapik-Miazga	9
3	(France) Coraline Vitalis	15
19	(Italy) Rossella Fiamingo	3
11	(Italy) Giulia Rizzi	6
6	(Italy) Alberta Santuccio	15
26	(Czech Republic) Veronika Bieleszová	14
9	(Poland) Aleksandra Jarecka	15
18	(Ukraine) Olena Kryvytska	10
2	(Estonia) Irina Embrich	15

Quarter-finals
1	(Ukraine) Vlada Kharkova	11
24	(Switzerland) Angeline Favre	15
12	(France) Auriane Mallo	15
13	(France) Marie-Florence Candassamy	7
3	(France) Coraline Vitalis	8
6	(Italy) Alberta Santuccio	15
9	(Poland) Aleksandra Jarecka	14
2	(Estonia) Irina Embrich	15

Semi-finals
24	(Switzerland) Angeline Favre	14
12	(France) Auriane Mallo	15
6	(Italy) Alberta Santuccio	12
2	(Estonia) Irina Embrich	15

Final
12	(France) Auriane Mallo	12
2	(Estonia) Irina Embrich	15

==== Sabre individual ====
Position	Name	Country
1st place, gold medalist(s)	Celia Pérez	Spain
2nd place, silver medalist(s)	Liza Pusztai	Hungary
3rd place, bronze medalist(s)	Zuzanna Cieślar	Poland
3rd place, bronze medalist(s)	Araceli Navarro	Spain
5.	Alina Komashchuk	Ukraine
6.	Sarah Noutcha	France
7.	Michela Battiston	Italy
8.	Theodora Gkountoura	Greece

Round of 16
1	(Ukraine) Alina Komashchuk	15
16	(Spain) Lucía Martín-Portugués	11
9	(Spain) Araceli Navarro	15
8	(Bulgaria) Yoana Ilieva	13
5	(Hungary) Liza Pusztai	15
12	(Georgia (country)) Lika Jijieishvili	9
20	(Turkey) Nisanur Erbil	12
4	(Italy) Michela Battiston	15
3	(France) Sarah Noutcha	15
19	(Ukraine) Olga Kharlan	11
11	(Poland) Zuzanna Cieślar	15
38	(Belgium) Jolien Corteyn	13
7	(Italy) Martina Criscio	10
23	(Greece) Theodora Gkountoura	15
15	(Spain) Celia Pérez	15
2	(France) Manon Brunet	11

Quarter-finals
1	(Ukraine) Alina Komashchuk	11
9	(Spain) Araceli Navarro	15
5	(Hungary) Liza Pusztai	15
4	(Italy) Michela Battiston	13
3	(France) Sarah Noutcha	14
11	(Poland) Zuzanna Cieślar	15
23	(Greece) Theodora Gkountoura	11
15	(Spain) Celia Pérez	15

Semi-finals
9	(Spain) Araceli Navarro	11
5	(Hungary) Liza Pusztai	15
11	(Poland) Zuzanna Cieślar	14
15	(Spain) Celia Pérez	15

Final
5	(Hungary) Liza Pusztai	13
15	(Spain) Celia Pérez	15

==== Foil team ====
Round of 16
Israel	30
Austria	45
Hungary	45
Turkey	17
Great Britain	35
Ukraine	45
Spain	41
Romania	36

Quarter-finals
Italy	45
Austria	36
Hungary	45
Germany	20
Poland	28
Ukraine	22
Spain	36
France	45

Semi-finals
Italy	45
Hungary	17
Poland	41
France	40

Final
Italy	45
Poland	27
Third place
Hungary	45
France	43

==== Épée team ====
Round of 16
Sweden	40
Israel	45
Estonia	45
Spain	23
Turkey	23
France	45
Ukraine	36
Great Britain	37
Finland	22
Hungary	45
Switzerland	42
Germany	39

Quarter-finals
Italy	45
Israel	15
Estonia	41
France	42
Great Britain	35
Hungary	45
Switzerland	38
Poland	43

Semi-finals
Italy	32
France	31
Hungary	45
Poland	37

Final
Italy	38
Hungary	31
Third place
France	33
Poland	32

==== Sabre team ====
Round of 16
Poland	45
Azerbaijan	28
Great Britain	31
Bulgaria	45
Germany	45
Turkey	43

Quarter-finals
France	45
Poland	30
Spain	45
Italy	37
Ukraine	45
Bulgaria	42
Germany	20
Hungary	40

Semi-finals
France	45
Spain	42
Ukraine	45
Hungary	41

Final
France	45
Ukraine	44
Third place
Spain	45
Hungary	38
