= Andor Mihályi =

Hungarian fencer (born 2002)

Personal information
- Full name: Andor Istvan Mihályi
- Born: 14 December 2002 (age 23)

Fencing career
- Sport: Fencing
- Country: Hungary
- Weapon: Foil
- Hand: Right-handed
Medal record
Men's foil
Representing Hungary
World Championships
Bronze medal – third place	2025 Tbilisi	Team
Junior World Championships
Bronze medal – third place	2022 Dubai	Team
European Championships
Silver medal – second place	2024 Basel	Team

Andor Istvan Mihályi (born 14 December 2002) is a Hungarian right-handed foil fencer. He won a bronze medal in the men's team foil event at the 2025 World Fencing Championships.

== Career ==
In July 2025, Mihályi competed at the 2025 World Fencing Championships in the individual foil and was eliminated in the round of 64. He then won a bronze medal in the men's team foil event.

== Medal record ==
=== World championship ===
Year	Location	Event	Position
2025	(Georgia (country)) Tbilisi, Georgia	Team Men's Foil	3rd
