= Men's team foil at the 2025 World Fencing Championships =

- Venue: Olympic Palace
- Location: Tbilisi, Georgia
- Dates: 25 July (preliminaries); 26 July (finals)
- Competitors: 139 from 36 nations
- Teams: 36

Medalists
gold medal	Guillaume Bianchi; Alessio Foconi; Filippo Macchi; Tommaso Marini	Italy
silver medal	Nick Itkin; Bryce Louie; Alexander Massialas; Gerek Meinhardt	United States
bronze medal	Dániel Dósa; Andor Mihályi; Gergő Szemes; Gergely Tóth	Hungary

The Men's team foil competition at the 2025 World Fencing Championships was held on 25 and 26 July 2025.

== Draw ==
=== Finals ===
Semifinals
Italy	45
France	30
Hungary	39
United States	45

Final
Italy	43
United States	42
Third place
France	34
Hungary	45

=== Top half ===
==== Section 1 ====
Round of 64
Kuwait	34
Croatia	45

Round of 32
Italy	45
Croatia	30
Ukraine	25
Singapore	45
South Korea	45
Individual Neutral Athletes	33
Kazakhstan	24
Poland	45

Round of 16
Italy	45
Singapore	20
South Korea	41
Poland	44

Quarterfinals
Italy	45
Poland	35

==== Section 2 ====
Round of 64
Peru	45
Iran	35

Round of 32
Egypt	45
Israel	37
Chile	9
Belgium	9
Germany	45
Angola	11
Peru	30
France	45

Round of 16
Egypt	43
Belgium	45
Germany	44
France	45

Quarterfinals
Belgium	35
France	45

=== Bottom half ===
==== Section 3 ====
Round of 64
Georgia	21
Mexico	45

Round of 32
Japan	45
Mexico	31
Austria	40
Great Britain	45
Hungary	45
Qatar	22
Bahrain	21
China	45

Round of 16
Japan	45
Great Britain	28
Hungary	45
China	28

Quarterfinals
Japan	44
Hungary	45

==== Section 4 ====
Round of 64
Uzbekistan	45
United Arab Emirates	26

Round of 32
Canada	44
Macau	37
Venezuela	15
Hong Kong	45
Spain	45
Brazil	35
Uzbekistan	23
United States	45

Round of 16
Canada	34
Hong Kong	45
Spain	28
United States	45

Quarterfinals
Hong Kong	23
United States	45

=== Placement rounds ===
==== 5–8th place bracket ====
5–8th place semifinals
Poland	45
Belgium	44
Japan	45
Hong Kong	41

Fifth place
Poland	26
Japan	45
Seventh place
Belgium	35
Hong Kong	45

==== 9–16th place bracket ====
9–16th place quarterfinals
Singapore	29
South Korea	45
Egypt	29
Germany	45
Great Britain	38
China	45
Canada	33
Spain	45

9–12th place semifinals
South Korea	35
Germany	45
China	45
Spain	38

Ninth place
Germany	36
China	45
Eleventh place
South Korea	44
Spain	45

==== 13–16th place bracket ====
13–16th place semifinals
Singapore	36
Egypt	45
Great Britain	43
Canada	45

13th place
Egypt	35
Canada	45
15th place
Singapore	42
Great Britain	45

== Final ranking ==
Rank	Team
1st place, gold medalist(s)	Italy
2nd place, silver medalist(s)	United States
3rd place, bronze medalist(s)	Hungary
4	France
5	Japan
6	Poland
7	Hong Kong
8	Belgium
9	China
10	Germany
11	Spain
12	South Korea
13	Canada
14	Egypt
15	Great Britain
16	Singapore
17	Ukraine
18	Brazil
19	Austria
20	Angola
21	Chile
22	Qatar
23	Venezuela
24	Individual Neutral Athletes
25	Kazakhstan
26	Macau
27	Bahrain
28	Israel
29	Peru
30	Mexico
31	Uzbekistan
32	Croatia
33	Kuwait
34	United Arab Emirates
35	Georgia
36	Iran
