= Youssef Sanaa =

Egyptian fencer

Personal information
- Nationality: Egyptian
- Born: 26 June 2000 (age 24)

Sport
- Sport: Fencing

Youssef Sanaa (born 26 June 2000) is an Egyptian fencer. He competed in the men's team foil event at the 2020 Summer Olympics.
