= Salim Heroui =

Algerian fencer (born 1999)

- Born: 19 March 1999; Algiers, Algeria

Sport
- Country: Algeria
- Weapon: Foil
- Hand: left-handed

Salim Heroui (Arabic: سليم هروي; born 19 March 1999 in Algiers) in an Algerian fencer. He competed at the 2020 Summer Olympics in the Men's Foil event. He finished in 35th place after losing to Vladislav Mylnikov of ROC in the Table of 64.
