= Men's team foil at the 2023 World Fencing Championships =

- Venue: Milan Convention Center
- Location: Milan, Italy
- Dates: 29–30 July
- Competitors: 124 from 32 nations
- Teams: 32

Medalists
gold medal	Kazuki Iimura; Kyosuke Matsuyama; Takahiro Shikine; Kenta Suzumura	Japan
silver medal	Chen Haiwei; Mo Ziwei; Wu Bin; Xu Jie	China
bronze medal	Cheung Ka Long; Ryan Choi; Leung Chin Yu; Yeung Chi Ka	Hong Kong

The Men's team foil competition at the 2023 World Fencing Championships was held on 29 and 30 July 2023.

== Draw ==
=== Finals ===
Semifinals
United States	35
China	45
Japan	45
Hong Kong	35

Final
China	35
Japan	45
Third place
United States	31
Hong Kong	45

=== Top half ===
==== Section 1 ====
Round of 32
United States	45
Iraq	12
Brazil	45
Austria	40
Canada	36
Chile	45
Australia	23
Poland	45

Round of 16
United States	45
Brazil	19
Chile	24
Poland	45

Quarterfinals
United States	45
Poland	29

==== Section 2 ====
Round of 32
Egypt	45
Colombia	19
Mexico	18
China	45
Hungary	45
Singapore	22
Venezuela	17
France	45

Round of 16
Egypt	39
China	45
Hungary	27
France	45

Quarterfinals
China	45
France	38

=== Bottom half ===
==== Section 3 ====
Round of 32
Japan	45
Croatia	19
Argentina	32
Ukraine	45
Germany	45
Israel	35
Georgia	26
South Korea	45

Round of 16
Japan	45
Ukraine	22
Germany	40
South Korea	45

Quarterfinals
Japan	45
South Korea	41

==== Section 4 ====
Round of 32
Hong Kong	45
India	20
Uzbekistan	21
Great Britain	44
Belgium	45
Spain	40
Qatar	16
Italy	45

Round of 16
Hong Kong	45
Great Britain	38
Belgium	29
Italy	45

Quarterfinals
Hong Kong	45
Italy	40

=== Placement rounds ===
==== 5–8th place bracket ====
5–8th place semifinals
Poland	41
France	45
South Korea	24
Italy	45

Fifth place
France	33
Italy	45
Seventh place
Poland	25
South Korea	45

==== 9–16th place bracket ====
9–16th place quarterfinals
Brazil	45
Chile	36
Egypt	45
Hungary	42
Ukraine	32
Germany	45
Great Britain	36
Belgium	45

9–12th place semifinals
Brazil	26
Egypt	45
Germany	41
Belgium	45

Ninth place
Egypt	45
Belgium	27
Eleventh place
Brazil	36
Germany	45

==== 13–16th place bracket ====
13–16th place semifinals
Chile	32
Hungary	45
Ukraine	27
Great Britain	45

13th place
Hungary	40
Great Britain	45
15th place
Chile	37
Ukraine	45

== Final ranking ==
Rank	Team
1st place, gold medalist(s)	Japan
2nd place, silver medalist(s)	China
3rd place, bronze medalist(s)	Hong Kong
4	United States
5	Italy
6	France
7	South Korea
8	Poland
9	Egypt
10	Belgium
11	Germany
12	Brazil
13	Great Britain
14	Hungary
15	Ukraine
16	Chile
17	Canada
18	Austria
19	Spain
20	Argentina
21	Singapore
22	Mexico
23	Israel
24	Uzbekistan
25	Australia
26	India
27	Georgia
28	Colombia
29	Venezuela
30	Croatia
31	Qatar
32	Iraq
