= Men's team foil at the 2026 World Fencing Championships =

- Venue: AsiaWorld–Expo
- Location: Hong Kong
- Dates: 28 July
- Competitors: 134 from 35 nations
- Teams: 35

Medalists
gold medal	Guillaume Bianchi; Filippo Macchi; Tommaso Marini; Tommaso Martini	Italy
silver medal	Cheung Ka Long; Ryan Choi; Harris Ho; Leung Chin Yu	Hong Kong
bronze medal	Nick Itkin; Bryce Louie; Alexander Massialas; Marcello Olivares	United States

The Men's team foil competition at the 2026 World Fencing Championships was held on 28 July 2026.

== Draw ==
=== Finals ===
Semifinals
Italy	45
Japan	37
Hong Kong	45
United States	43

Final
Italy	45
Hong Kong	44
Third place
Japan	28
United States	45

=== Top half ===
==== Section 1 ====
Round of 64
Malaysia	45
Philippines	44

Round of 32
Italy	45
Malaysia	15
Brazil	45
Great Britain	41
China	45
Kazakhstan	29
Qatar	28
Egypt	45

Round of 16
Italy	45
Brazil	20
China	43
Egypt	44

Quarterfinals
Italy	45
Egypt	28

==== Section 2 ====
Round of 32
Japan	45
Venezuela	31
Chile	26
Spain	45
South Korea	45
Chinese Taipei	38
India	17
France	45

Round of 16
Japan	45
Spain	35
South Korea	45
France	43

Quarterfinals
Japan	45
South Korea	38

=== Bottom half ===
==== Section 3 ====
Round of 64
Macau	45
Bahrain	26

Round of 32
Hong Kong	45
Macau	28
Singapore	42
Belgium	45
Poland	45
Mexico	34
Algeria	16
Hungary	45

Round of 16
Hong Kong	45
Belgium	28
Poland	40
Hungary	45

Quarterfinals
Hong Kong	45
Hungary	37

==== Section 4 ====
Round of 64
Australia	45
Thailand	41

Round of 32
Russia	45
Israel	28
Uzbekistan	30
Germany	45
Canada	45
Ukraine	33
Australia	23
United States	45

Round of 16
Russia	45
Germany	41
Canada	27
United States	45

Quarterfinals
Russia	39
United States	45

=== Placement rounds ===
==== 5–8th place bracket ====
5–8th place semifinals
Egypt
South Korea	w/o
Hungary	30
Russia	45

Fifth place
South Korea	35
Russia	44
Seventh place
Egypt
Hungary	w/o

==== 9–16th place bracket ====
9–16th place quarterfinals
Brazil	28
China	45
Spain	36
France	45
Belgium	34
Poland	45
Germany	45
Canada	30

9–12th place semifinals
China	38
France	45
Poland	45
Germany	27

Ninth place
France	45
Poland	32
Eleventh place
China	35
Germany	45

==== 13–16th place bracket ====
13–16th place semifinals
Brazil	45
Spain	42
Belgium	37
Canada	45

13th place
Brazil	41
Canada	45
15th place
Spain	45
Belgium	35

== Final ranking ==
Rank	Team
1st place, gold medalist(s)	Italy
2nd place, silver medalist(s)	Hong Kong
3rd place, bronze medalist(s)	United States
4	Japan
5	Russia
6	South Korea
7	Hungary
8	Egypt
9	France
10	Poland
11	Germany
12	China
13	Canada
14	Brazil
15	Spain
16	Belgium
17	Great Britain
18	Ukraine
19	Singapore
20	Chinese Taipei
21	Chile
22	Mexico
23	Uzbekistan
24	Kazakhstan
25	Qatar
26	Israel
27	Algeria
28	Venezuela
29	India
30	Australia
31	Malaysia
32	Macau
33	Bahrain
34	Philippines
35	Thailand
