= 2024 Asian Fencing Championships =

Fencing Championship

- Host city: Kuwait City, Kuwait
- Dates: 22–27 June 2024
- Main venue: Sheikh Saad Al-Abdullah Sports Complex

The 2024 Asian Fencing Championships were held in Kuwait City, Kuwait from 22 to 27 June 2024 at the Sheikh Saad Al-Abdullah Sports Complex.

== Medal summary ==
=== Men ===
Event	Gold	Silver	Bronze
Individual épée	Ho Wai Hang; Hong Kong	Ng Ho Tin; Hong Kong	Yerlik Sertay; Kazakhstan
Individual épée	Ho Wai Hang; Hong Kong	Ng Ho Tin; Hong Kong	Akira Komata; Japan
Team épée	Kazakhstan; Elmir Alimzhanov; Ruslan Kurbanov; Yerlik Sertay; Vadim Sharlaimov	Japan; Koki Kano; Akira Komata; Kazuyasu Minobe; Masaru Yamada	China; Lan Minghao; Wang Zijie; Xiu Yuhan; Yang Fengming
Team épée	Kazakhstan; Elmir Alimzhanov; Ruslan Kurbanov; Yerlik Sertay; Vadim Sharlaimov	Japan; Koki Kano; Akira Komata; Kazuyasu Minobe; Masaru Yamada	Hong Kong; Fong Hoi Sun; Ho Wai Hang; Ng Ho Tin; Ng Ting Hin
Individual foil	Kyosuke Matsuyama; Japan	Kazuki Iimura; Japan	Mo Ziwei; China
Individual foil	Kyosuke Matsuyama; Japan	Kazuki Iimura; Japan	Takahiro Shikine; Japan
Team foil	China; Chen Haiwei; Mo Ziwei; Wu Bin; Xu Jie	South Korea; Ha Tae-gyu; Im Cheol-woo; Lee Kwang-hyun; Youn Jeong-hyun	Japan; Kazuki Iimura; Kyosuke Matsuyama; Yudai Nagano; Takahiro Shikine
Team foil	China; Chen Haiwei; Mo Ziwei; Wu Bin; Xu Jie	South Korea; Ha Tae-gyu; Im Cheol-woo; Lee Kwang-hyun; Youn Jeong-hyun	Hong Kong; Cheung Ka Long; Ryan Choi; Edward Choi; Leung Chin Yu
Individual sabre	Oh Sang-uk; South Korea	Shen Chenpeng; China	Yousef Al-Shamlan; Kuwait
Individual sabre	Oh Sang-uk; South Korea	Shen Chenpeng; China	Mohammad Rahbari; Iran
Team sabre	South Korea; Gu Bon-gil; Ha Han-sol; Oh Sang-uk; Park Sang-won	Iran; Farzad Baher; Mohammad Fotouhi; Ali Pakdaman; Mohammad Rahbari	Hong Kong; Royce Chan; Aaron Ho; Leung Tin Ching; Low Ho Tin
Team sabre	South Korea; Gu Bon-gil; Ha Han-sol; Oh Sang-uk; Park Sang-won	Iran; Farzad Baher; Mohammad Fotouhi; Ali Pakdaman; Mohammad Rahbari	Kazakhstan; Bakdaulet Kuralbekuly; Zhanat Nabiyev; Artyom Sarkissyan; Nazarbay Sattarkhan

=== Women ===
Event	Gold	Silver	Bronze
Individual épée	Yu Sihan; China	Sun Yiwen; China	Kang Young-mi; South Korea
Individual épée	Yu Sihan; China	Sun Yiwen; China	Song Se-ra; South Korea
Team épée	South Korea; Choi In-jeong; Kang Young-mi; Lee Hye-in; Song Se-ra	China; Sun Yiwen; Tang Junyao; Xu Nuo; Yu Sihan	Hong Kong; Au Sin Ying; Chan Wai Ling; Kaylin Hsieh; Coco Lin
Team épée	South Korea; Choi In-jeong; Kang Young-mi; Lee Hye-in; Song Se-ra	China; Sun Yiwen; Tang Junyao; Xu Nuo; Yu Sihan	Japan; Ruka Narita; Honami Suzuki; Tamaki Terayama; Miho Yoshimura
Individual foil	Hong Se-na; South Korea	Komaki Kikuchi; Japan	Yuka Ueno; Japan
Individual foil	Hong Se-na; South Korea	Komaki Kikuchi; Japan	Wang Yuting; China
Team foil	Japan; Sera Azuma; Komaki Kikuchi; Karin Miyawaki; Yuka Ueno	China; Chen Qingyuan; Huang Qianqian; Jiao Enqi; Wang Yuting	South Korea; Hong Se-na; Kim Ki-yeun; Lee Se-joo; Park Ji-hee
Team foil	Japan; Sera Azuma; Komaki Kikuchi; Karin Miyawaki; Yuka Ueno	China; Chen Qingyuan; Huang Qianqian; Jiao Enqi; Wang Yuting	Hong Kong; Daphne Chan; Valerie Cheng; Kuan Yu Ching; Sophia Wu
Individual sabre	Misaki Emura; Japan	Yoon Ji-su; South Korea	Seri Ozaki; Japan
Individual sabre	Misaki Emura; Japan	Yoon Ji-su; South Korea	Jeon Ha-young; South Korea
Team sabre	China; Rao Xueyi; Wei Jiayi; Yang Hengyu; Zhang Xinyi	Kazakhstan; Karina Dospay; Anastassiya Gulik; Zhasmin Kapydzhy; Aigerim Sarybay	South Korea; Choi Se-bin; Jeon Ha-young; Jeon Eun-hye; Yoon Ji-su
Team sabre	China; Rao Xueyi; Wei Jiayi; Yang Hengyu; Zhang Xinyi	Kazakhstan; Karina Dospay; Anastassiya Gulik; Zhasmin Kapydzhy; Aigerim Sarybay	Japan; Misaki Emura; Shihomi Fukushima; Seri Ozaki; Risa Takashima

== Medal table ==
Rank	Nation	Gold	Silver	Bronze	Total
1	South Korea	4	2	5	11
2	China	3	4	3	10
3	Japan	3	3	7	13
4	Hong Kong	1	1	5	7
5	Kazakhstan	1	1	2	4
6	Iran	0	1	1	2
7	Kuwait	0	0	1	1
Totals (7 entries)		12	12	24	48

== Results ==
=== Men ===
==== Individual épée ====
Quarterfinals		Semifinals		Final
Ho Wai Hang (HKG)	15
Ma Se-geon (KOR)	9	Ho Wai Hang (HKG)	15
Yerlik Sertay (KAZ)	15	Yerlik Sertay (KAZ)	13
Elmir Alimzhanov (KAZ)	5			Ho Wai Hang (HKG)	15
Koki Kano (JPN)	9			Ng Ho Tin (HKG)	14
Akira Komata (JPN)	10	Akira Komata (JPN)	9
Ng Ting Hin (HKG)	13	Ng Ho Tin (HKG)	10
Ng Ho Tin (HKG)	15

==== Team épée ====
Quarterfinals
Japan	45
Australia	29
Saudi Arabia	33
China	45
South Korea	38
Hong Kong	45
Kyrgyzstan	32
Kazakhstan	45

Semifinals
Japan	45
China	41
Hong Kong	34
Kazakhstan	44

Final
Japan	34
Kazakhstan	40
3rd place
China	45
Hong Kong	43

==== Individual foil ====
Quarterfinals		Semifinals		Final
Ryan Choi (HKG)	10
Mo Ziwei (CHN)	15	Mo Ziwei (CHN)	11
Kazuki Iimura (JPN)	15	Kazuki Iimura (JPN)	15
Wu Bin (CHN)	14			Kazuki Iimura (JPN)	7
Youn Jeong-hyun (KOR)	6			Kyosuke Matsuyama (JPN)	15
Kyosuke Matsuyama (JPN)	15	Kyosuke Matsuyama (JPN)	15
Xu Jie (CHN)	12	Takahiro Shikine (JPN)	7
Takahiro Shikine (JPN)	15

==== Team foil ====
Quarterfinals
Japan	45
Kuwait	15
Singapore	36
South Korea	45
China	45
Qatar	25
Chinese Taipei	30
Hong Kong	45

Semifinals
Japan	41
South Korea	45
China	45
Hong Kong	44

Final
South Korea	36
China	45
3rd place
Japan	45
Hong Kong	41

==== Individual sabre ====
Quarterfinals		Semifinals		Final
Shen Chenpeng (CHN)	15
Mohammad Fotouhi (IRI)	14	Shen Chenpeng (CHN)	15
Park Sang-won (KOR)	11	Yousef Al-Shamlan (KUW)	9
Yousef Al-Shamlan (KUW)	15			Shen Chenpeng (CHN)	9
Farzad Baher (IRI)	12			Oh Sang-uk (KOR)	15
Mohammad Rahbari (IRI)	15	Mohammad Rahbari (IRI)	5
Zuhriddin Kodirov (UZB)	11	Oh Sang-uk (KOR)	15
Oh Sang-uk (KOR)	15

==== Team sabre ====
Quarterfinals
South Korea	45
Saudi Arabia	31
Hong Kong	45
China	37
Japan	44
Kazakhstan	45
India	26
Iran	45

Semifinals
South Korea	45
Hong Kong	37
Kazakhstan	37
Iran	45

Final
South Korea	45
Iran	26
3rd place
Hong Kong	45
Kazakhstan	41

=== Women ===
==== Individual épée ====
Quarterfinals		Semifinals		Final
Lee Hye-in (KOR)	12
Sun Yiwen (CHN)	13	Sun Yiwen (CHN)	15
Kang Young-mi (KOR)	15	Kang Young-mi (KOR)	8
Choi In-jeong (KOR)	14			Sun Yiwen (CHN)	8
Kaylin Hsieh (HKG)	9			Yu Sihan (CHN)	9
Song Se-ra (KOR)	15	Song Se-ra (KOR)	12
Yu Sihan (CHN)	WO	Yu Sihan (CHN)	13
Vivian Kong (HKG)

==== Team épée ====
Quarterfinals
South Korea	45
Chinese Taipei	34
Singapore	31
Japan	45
Hong Kong	45
Kazakhstan	21
Uzbekistan	19
China	45

Semifinals
South Korea	45
Japan	26
Hong Kong	40
China	45

Final
South Korea	42
China	41
3rd place
Japan	35
Hong Kong	45

==== Individual foil ====
Quarterfinals		Semifinals		Final
Komaki Kikuchi (JPN)	15
Kim Ki-yeun (KOR)	14	Komaki Kikuchi (JPN)	15
Yuka Ueno (JPN)	15	Yuka Ueno (JPN)	13
Amita Berthier (SGP)	8			Komaki Kikuchi (JPN)	12
Park Ji-hee (KOR)	14			Hong Se-na (KOR)	15
Wang Yuting (CHN)	15	Wang Yuting (CHN)	13
Valerie Cheng (HKG)	8	Hong Se-na (KOR)	15
Hong Se-na (KOR)	15

==== Team foil ====
Quarterfinals
Japan	45
Kazakhstan	17
Macau	24
Hong Kong	45
South Korea	45
Singapore	35
Chinese Taipei	19
China	44

Semifinals
Japan	45
Hong Kong	28
South Korea	42
China	44

Final
Japan	39
China	34
3rd place
Hong Kong	36
South Korea	45

==== Individual sabre ====
Quarterfinals		Semifinals		Final
Misaki Emura (JPN)	15
Bhavani Devi (IND)	9	Misaki Emura (JPN)	15
Yang Hengyu (CHN)	12	Seri Ozaki (JPN)	9
Seri Ozaki (JPN)	15			Misaki Emura (JPN)	15
Yoon Ji-su (KOR)	15			Yoon Ji-su (KOR)	14
Zhang Xinyi (CHN)	12	Yoon Ji-su (KOR)	15
Zaynab Dayibekova (UZB)	9	Jeon Ha-young (KOR)	14
Jeon Ha-young (KOR)	15

==== Team sabre ====
Quarterfinals
South Korea	45
Uzbekistan	43
Kazakhstan	45
Hong Kong	40
China	45
Singapore	28
India	22
Japan	45

Semifinals
South Korea	36
Kazakhstan	45
China	45
Japan	31

Final
Kazakhstan	42
China	45
3rd place
South Korea	45
Japan	37
