= Luis Klein =

German fencer (born 1999)

Personal information
- Nationality: German
- Born: 6 January 1999 (age 27) Buenos Aires, Argentina

Sport
- Sport: Fencing
Medal record
Men's foil
Representing Germany
European Games
Bronze medal – third place	2023 Kraków–Małopolska	Team
European Championships
Silver medal – second place	2019 Düsseldorf	Team
Bronze medal – third place	2023 Kraków	Team
Bronze medal – third place	2026 Antony	Team

Luis Klein (born 6 January 1999) is a German fencer. He competed in the men's team foil event at the 2020 Summer Olympics.
