= Gergely Tóth (fencer) =

Hungarian fencer (born 2002)

Personal information
- Born: 3 April 2002 (age 24)

Fencing career
- Sport: Fencing
- Country: Hungary
- Weapon: Foil
- Hand: Right-handed
Medal record
Men's foil
Representing Hungary
World Championships
| Bronze medal – third place | 2025 Tbilisi | Team |
European Championships
| Silver medal – second place | 2024 Basel | Team |

Gergely Tóth (born 3 April 2002) is a Hungarian right-handed foil fencer. He won a bronze medal in the men's team foil event at the 2025 World Fencing Championships.

== Career ==
In July 2025, Tóth competed at the 2025 World Fencing Championships in the individual foil and was eliminated in the round of 32. He then won a bronze medal in the men's team foil event.

== Medal record ==
=== World championship ===
| Year | Location | Event | Position |
|---|---|---|---|
| 2025 | (Georgia (country)) Tbilisi, Georgia | Team Men's Foil | 3rd |
