= Gergő Szemes =

Hungarian fencer (born 2003)

Personal information
- Born: 11 February 2003 (age 23)

Fencing career
- Sport: Fencing
- Country: Hungary
- Weapon: Foil
- Hand: Left-handed
- Club: FerencvÃ¡rosi Torna Club
- Head coach: Benedek Szirma
Medal record
Men's foil
Representing Hungary
World Championships
Bronze medal – third place	2025 Tbilisi	Individual
Bronze medal – third place	2025 Tbilisi	Team
European Championships
Silver medal – second place	2024 Basel	Team
Junior World Championships
Bronze medal – third place	2022 Dubai	Team
Bronze medal – third place	2023 Plovdiv	Individual

Gergő Szemes (born 11 February 2003) is a Hungarian left-handed foil fencer. He won bronze medals in the men's foil and men's team foil events at the 2025 World Fencing Championships.

== Career ==
In July 2025, Szemes competed at the 2025 World Fencing Championships and won a bronze medal in the individual foil event. This marked Hungary's first foil medal at the World Fencing Championships since Jenő Kamuti in 1973. He also won a bronze medal in the men's team foil.

== Medal record ==
=== World championship ===
Year	Location	Event	Position
2025	(Georgia (country)) Tbilisi, Georgia	Team Men's Foil	3rd
