= Lawrence Ng (fencer) =

Hong Kong fencer

Personal information
- Native name: 吳諾弘
- Full name: Lawrence Ng Lok-wang
- Nationality: Hong Konger
- Born: 14 October 1999 (age 26)

Sport
- Sport: Fencing
Medal record
World University Games
Gold medal – first place	2021 Chengdu	Team

Lawrence Ng Lok-wang (Chinese: 吳諾弘; born 14 October 1999) is a Hong Kong fencer. He competed in the men's team foil event at the 2020 Summer Olympics.
