= Cheung Ka Long =

Hong Kong professional fencer (born 1997)

Edgar Cheung Ka Long
- Cheung in 2017

Personal information
- Native name: 張家朗
- Born: 10 June 1997 (age 29) British Hong Kong
- Height: 193 cm (6 ft 4 in)
- Weight: 68 kg (150 lb)

Fencing career
- Sport: Fencing
- Weapon: Foil
- Hand: Left-handed
- Club: Hong Kong Sports Institute
- Head coach: Grégory Koenig
- FIE ranking: current ranking
- Domestic ranking: 13
Medal record
Men's foil
Representing Hong Kong
Olympic Games
Gold medal – first place	2020 Tokyo	Individual
Gold medal – first place	2024 Paris	Individual
World Championships
Silver medal – second place	2026 Hong Kong	Team
Bronze medal – third place	2022 Cairo	Individual
Bronze medal – third place	2023 Milan	Team
Asian Games
Gold medal – first place	2022 Hangzhou	Individual
Silver medal – second place	2018 Jakarta	Team
Silver medal – second place	2026 Aichi-Nagoya	Team
Bronze medal – third place	2014 Incheon	Team
Bronze medal – third place	2018 Jakarta	Individual
Bronze medal – third place	2022 Hangzhou	Team
Asian Championships
Gold medal – first place	2016 Wuxi	Individual
Gold medal – first place	2022 Seoul	Individual
Silver medal – second place	2017 Hong Kong	Individual
Silver medal – second place	2018 Bangkok	Team
Silver medal – second place	2019 Chiba	Individual
Silver medal – second place	2026 New Delhi	Team
Bronze medal – third place	2014 Suwon	Team
Bronze medal – third place	2015 Singapore	Individual
Bronze medal – third place	2015 Singapore	Team
Bronze medal – third place	2016 Wuxi	Team
Bronze medal – third place	2017 Hong Kong	Team
Bronze medal – third place	2019 Chiba	Team
Bronze medal – third place	2022 Seoul	Team
Bronze medal – third place	2023 Wuxi	Team
Bronze medal – third place	2024 Kuwait City	Team
Bronze medal – third place	2025 Bali	Team
Junior World Championships
Gold medal – first place	2017 Plovdiv	Individual

Cheung Ka-long
- Traditional Chinese: 張家朗
- Simplified Chinese: 张家朗
Transcriptions
Standard Mandarin
- Hanyu Pinyin: zhāng jiā lǎng
Yue: Cantonese
- Jyutping: zoeng1 gaa1 long5

Edgar Cheung Ka-long SBS (Chinese: 張家朗; Jyutping: zoeng1 gaa1 long5; born 10 June 1997) is a Hong Kong left-handed foil fencer, two-time Olympic champion and two-time individual Asian champion, having won the gold medal at the 2020 and 2024 Summer Olympics.

Cheung is the first athlete representing Hong Kong in history to win two consecutive Olympic gold medals and the second to become an Olympic champion, after windsurfer Lee Lai Shan. He is also the fourth non-European and third Asian to do so, after Ramón Fonst, Kim Young-ho, and Lei Sheng.

== Career ==
Cheung Ka-long was born to parents who both played national league basketball in Hong Kong. While his parents didn't approve, he took up fencing in the fourth grade. In 2013, he was named Hong Kong's Most Promising Young Athlete at the Hong Kong Sports Stars Awards. In 2014, he was named an Outstanding Junior Athlete by the Hong Kong Sports Institute; he won a bronze in team foil at the Asian Fencing Championships and at the Asian Games that same year. In 2015, he earned two bronzes, one in individual foil and another in team foil during the Asian Fencing Championships. In 2016, he won gold and a bronze in team in the Asian Fencing Championships. At the Olympics in foil, he defeated Heo Jun in the round of 32 before losing to Guilherme Toldo in the round of 16, finishing 14th overall. In 2017, Cheung won gold in individual foil at the Junior World Championships. He then earned a silver medal in individual foil and a bronze in team foil in the Asian Fencing Championships. In 2018, he won a silver in team foil at the Asian Fencing Championships along with a bronze in individual foil and a silver in team foil at the Asian Games. In 2019, he earned a silver medal in the Turin Grand Prix, a bronze in the Anaheim Grand Prix as well as a silver in individual foil and a bronze in team foil at the Asian Fencing Championships.

In 2021 at the Tokyo Olympics, Cheung and Tse Ying Suet were the flag bearers for Hong Kong. In foil, he defeated Julien Mertine in the round of 32, 2018 world champion Alessio Foconi in the round of 16, Kirill Borodachev in the quarterfinals and Alexander Choupenitch in the semifinals. In the final he faced the reigning Olympic champion Daniele Garozzo; after trailing 1–4 he fought back to win by a score of 15–11. This was Hong Kong's first Olympic gold medal in fencing and its second-ever gold. For his achievements, he was awarded the Silver Bauhinia Star, the highest possible award for an actively competing athlete.

In the 2024 Paris Olympics, Cheung successfully defended his men's foil gold medal, defeating Italian Filippo Macchi 15–14 in the final bout.

Cheung is the third man to retain an Olympic foil title, after Nedo Nadi and Christian d'Oriola.

== Medal record ==
=== Olympic Games ===
Year	Location	Event	Position
2021	Tokyo, Japan	Individual Men's Foil	1st
2024	Paris, France	Individual Men's Foil	1st

=== World Championship ===
Year	Location	Event	Position
2022	Cairo, Egypt	Individual Men's Foil	3rd
2023	Milan, Italy	Team Men's Foil	3rd
2026	Hong Kong	Team Men's Foil	2nd

=== Grand Prix ===
Date	Location	Event	Position
2019-02-08	Turin, Italy	Individual Men's Foil	2nd
2019-03-15	Anaheim, United States	Individual Men's Foil	3rd
2023-03-19	Busan, South Korea	Individual Men's Foil	2nd
2024-02-11	Turin, Italy	Individual Men's Foil	1st
2024-05-19	Shanghai, China	Individual Men's Foil	1st
2025-05-18	Shanghai, China	Individual Men's Foil	3rd
2026-02-07	Turin, Italy	Individual Men's Foil	3rd
2026-03-22	Lima, Peru	Individual Men's Foil	3rd

=== World Cup ===
Date	Location	Event	Position
2017-05-05	Saint Petersburg, Russia	Individual Men's Foil	3rd
2017-10-20	Cairo, Egypt	Individual Men's Foil	3rd
2019-05-05	Saint Petersburg, Russia	Team Men's Foil	2nd
2020-02-23	Cairo, Egypt	Team Men's Foil	3rd
2022-01-15	Paris, France	Individual Men's Foil	1st
2023-01-12	Paris, France	Individual Men's Foil	3rd
2023-05-06	Acapulco, Mexico	Individual Men's Foil	2nd
2023-11-10	Istanbul, Turkey	Individual Men's Foil	2nd
2023-12-10	Tokoname, Japan	Team Men's Foil	3rd
2024-05-04	Hong Kong	Team Men's Foil	1st
2026-01-11	Paris, France	Team Men's Foil	1st
2026-04-19	Cairo, Egypt	Team Men's Foil	2nd
2026-05-03	Istanbul, Turkey	Team Men's Foil	3rd

=== Asian Championship ===
Year	Location	Event	Position
2014	Suwon, South Korea	Team Men's Foil	3rd
2015	Singapore	Individual Men's Foil	3rd
2015	Singapore	Team Men's Foil	3rd
2016	Wuxi, China	Individual Men's Foil	1st
2016	Wuxi, China	Team Men's Foil	3rd
2017	Hong Kong	Individual Men's Foil	2nd
2017	Hong Kong	Team Men's Foil	3rd
2018	Bangkok, Thailand	Team Men's Foil	2nd
2019	Chiba, Japan	Individual Men's Foil	2nd
2019	Chiba, Japan	Team Men's Foil	3rd
2022	Seoul, South Korea	Individual Men's Foil	1st
2022	Seoul, South Korea	Team Men's Foil	3rd
2023	Wuxi, China	Team Men's Foil	3rd
2024	Kuwait City, Kuwait	Team Men's Foil	3rd
2025	Bali, Indonesia	Team Men's Foil	3rd
2026	(India) New Delhi, Insia	Team Men's Foil	2nd

== Impact ==
The term "Ka-long effect" was coined after his historic gold in the 2020 Tokyo Olympics. Fencing schools in Hong Kong witnessed a surge in calls from parents wanting their kids to take up lessons, as the sport received a huge boost in popularity. The phenomenon reoccurred in 2024 after his and Vivian Kong's fencing gold-medal wins at the 2024 Paris Olympics.

Cheung's victory over Italian fencer Filippo Macchi in the 2024 Paris Olympic finals, sparked a conflict between Hong Kong and Italian netizens. Cheung's Instagram page was flooded with comments claiming Italy had been 'robbed'; in response, Hong Kong fans taunted the Italians by expressing their fondness of pineapple pizza and soy sauce spaghetti, in an effort to poke fun at the Italian disdain for pineapple as a pizza topping and to deride on Italian cuisine. As a playful response to the online exchange, Pizza Hut branches in Hong Kong and Macau announced free pineapple toppings on their pizzas from 6 pm on July 30 until July 31, joining in the lighthearted jabs at Italian netizens resentful of Cheung's Olympic win.
