= Maxime Pianfetti =

French fencer (born 1999)

Personal information
- Born: 15 March 1999 (age 27) Tarbes, France

Sport
- Country: France
- Sport: Fencing
Medal record
Representing France
Men's sabre
Olympic Games
Bronze medal – third place	2024 Paris	Team
World Championships
Gold medal – first place	2026 Hong Kong	Team
Silver medal – second place	2022 Cairo	Individual
European Games
Gold medal – first place	2023 Kraków–Małopolska	Team
European Championships
Gold medal – first place	2023 Kraków	Team
Silver medal – second place	2026 Antony	Individual
Bronze medal – third place	2026 Antony	Team
Universiade
Bronze medal – third place	2019 Naples	Team

Maxime Pianfetti (born 15 March 1999) is a French fencer. He competed at the 2022 World Fencing Championships, winning the silver medal in the men's sabre event. He also competed at the 2024 Summer Olympics, winning the bronze medal in the men's team sabree event.
