= Yudai Nagano (fencer) =

Japanese fencer (born 1998)

Personal information
- Born: 15 October 1998 (age 27) Ibaraki, Japan
- Height: 1.72 m (5 ft 8 in)

Fencing career
- Sport: Fencing
- Country: Japan
- Weapon: Foil
- Hand: Right-handed
- National coach: Erwann Le Pechoux
- FIE ranking: Current ranking
Medal record
Men's foil
Representing Japan
Olympic Games
Gold medal – first place	2024 Paris	Team
Asian Championships
Bronze medal – third place	2024 Kuwait City	Team

Yudai Nagano (永野 雄大, Nagano Yūdai, born 15 October 1998) is a Japanese foil fencer. He competed in the 2020 Summer Olympics and the helped win a gold medal for Japan in the 2024 Paris Olympics men's foil team event.

Nagano earned a bronze medal in the 2022 Tokyo Fencing World Cup individual men's event.
