= Leung Chin Yu =

Hong Kong foil fencer (born 2004)

Personal information
- Native name: 梁千雨
- Born: 30 September 2004 (age 22)

Fencing career
- Sport: Fencing
- Country: Hong Kong
- Weapon: Foil
- Hand: Right-handed
Medal record
Men's foil
Representing Hong Kong
World Championships
Silver medal – second place	2026 Hong Kong	Team
Bronze medal – third place	2023 Milan	Team
Asian Games
Silver medal – second place	2026 Aichi-Nagoya	Team
Asian Championships
Silver medal – second place	2026 New Delhi	Team
Bronze medal – third place	2023 Wuxi	Team
Bronze medal – third place	2024 Kuwait City	Team
Bronze medal – third place	2025 Bali	Team

Leung Chin Yu (Chinese: 梁千雨); born 30 September 2004) is a Hong Kong right-handed foil fencer.

== Career ==
Leung competed at the 2023 World Fencing Championships and won a bronze medal in the team foil event. This was Hong Kong's first ever team medal at the World Fencing Championships.

In July 2026, he competed at the 2026 World Fencing Championships and won a silver medal in the team foil event.
