= Bryce Louie =

American fencer (born 2002)

Personal information
- Born: March 6, 2002 (age 24)
- Home town: Los Angeles, California, U.S.

Fencing career
- Sport: Fencing
- Country: United States
- Weapon: Foil
- Hand: right-handed
Medal record
Men's foil
Representing the United States
World Championships
Silver medal – second place	2025 Tbilisi	Team
Bronze medal – third place	2026 Hong Kong	Team
Pan American Championships
Gold medal – first place	2025 Rio de Janeiro	Team
Gold medal – first place	2026 Lima	Team

Bryce Louie (born March 6, 2002) is an American right-handed foil fencer. He won a silver medal in the men's team foil event at the 2025 World Fencing Championships.

== Early life and education ==
Louie attended Campbell Hall School in Studio City, California. He began fencing at eight years old. He then attended the University of Pennsylvania where he was a member of the Penn Quakers fencing team. On March 24, 2024, he won the men's foil NCAA fencing championships. He became the first national champion for Penn since 2013 and the first in foil since 1997. He was subsequently named the U.S. Fencing Coaches Association (USFCA) Foil Athlete of the Year.

== Career ==
In June 2025, he represented the United States at the 2025 Pan American Fencing Championships and won a gold medal in the team foil event. The next month he competed at the 2025 World Fencing Championships and won a silver medal in the men's team foil event. The United States lost to Italy in the final by one point, losing 42–43.

== Personal life ==
Louie's mother is from the Philippines and his father has Chinese ancestry. His older brother, Brennan, is a former fencer who represented the Philippines at the 2017 Southeast Asian Games and won a gold medal. On November 28, 2023, Brennan was named an assistant fencing coach at Penn.

== Medal record ==
=== World Championship ===
Year	Location	Event	Position
2025	(Georgia (country)) Tbilisi, Georgia	Team men's foil	2nd

=== World Cup ===
Date	Location	Event	Position
November 22, 2024	Tunis, Tunisia	Individual men's foil	2nd
November 24, 2024	Tunis, Tunisia	Team men's foil	2nd
April 19, 2026	Cairo, Egypt	Team men's foil	3rd

=== Pan American Championship ===
Year	Location	Event	Position
2025	Rio de Janeiro, Brazil	Team men's foil	1st
2026	Lima, Peru	Team men's foil	1st
