= Ryan Choi (fencer) =

Hong Kong fencer (born 1997)

Ryan Choi Chun-yin

Personal information
- Native name: 蔡俊彥
- Born: 9 October 1997 (age 29) Hong Kong

Fencing career
- Sport: Fencing
- Country: Hong Kong
- Weapon: Foil
- Hand: Left-handed
- Club: Hong Kong Sports Institute
- Head coach: Grégory Koenig
- FIE ranking: current ranking
Medal record
Men's foil
Representing Hong Kong
World Championships
Gold medal – first place	2025 Tbilisi	Individual
Silver medal – second place	2026 Hong Kong	Team
Bronze medal – third place	2023 Milan	Team
Asian Games
Silver medal – second place	2018 Jakarta	Team
Silver medal – second place	2026 Aichi–Nagoya	Individual
Silver medal – second place	2026 Aichi–Nagoya	Team
Bronze medal – third place	2022 Hangzhou	Individual
Bronze medal – third place	2022 Hangzhou	Team
Asian Championships
Gold medal – first place	2025 Bali	Individual
Silver medal – second place	2018 Bangkok	Team
Silver medal – second place	2026 New Delhi	Team
Bronze medal – third place	2022 Seoul	Individual
Bronze medal – third place	2019 Chiba	Team
Bronze medal – third place	2022 Seoul	Team
Bronze medal – third place	2023 Wuxi	Team
Bronze medal – third place	2024 Kuwait City	Team
Bronze medal – third place	2025 Bali	Team
World University Games
Gold medal – first place	2021 Chengdu	Team
Bronze medal – third place	2021 Chengdu	Individual
Youth Olympic Games
Gold medal – first place	2014 Nanjing	Mixed team
Silver medal – second place	2014 Nanjing	Individual

Choi Chun-yin
- Traditional Chinese: 蔡俊彥
Transcriptions
Yue: Cantonese
- Jyutping: coi3 zeon3 jin6

Ryan Choi Chun-yin (Chinese: 蔡俊彥; Jyutping: coi3 zeon3 jin6); born 9 October 1997) is a Hong Kong fencer. He competed in the men's team foil event at the 2020 Summer Olympics.

== Student stage ==
Choi started learning fencing at La Salle Primary School, and joined the fencing team after entering La Salle College, and represented the school in inter-school competitions, making a name for himself. Since Form 3, he, who is good at foil, has started special training at the Hong Kong Sports Institute. Due to the overlap of fencing practice schedules, he rarely participates in the Saturday afternoon group practice of the La Salle Fencing Team, but he still represents the school in competitions and is one of the main players in the team.

Choi won the gold medal in the individual foil event at the 2012 Asian Junior and Cadet Fencing Championships. He also won the B Grade individual foil championship in the Hong Kong and Kowloon Inter-school Fencing Competition held in January 2013. Choi briefly studied accounting at the University of Hong Kong and quit in his sophomore year in 2018 to become a full-time athlete. He was roommates with actor-singer Edan Lui during his university years.

== Medal record ==
=== World Championships ===
Year	Location	Event	Position
2023	Milan, Italy	Team Men's Foil	3rd
2025	(Georgia (country)) Tbilisi, Georgia	Individual Men's Foil	1st
2026	Hong Kong	Team Men's Foil	2nd

=== Grand Prix ===
Year	Location	Event	Position
2019-05-17	Shanghai, China	Individual Men's Foil	3rd
2022-05-15	Incheon, South Korea	Individual Men's Foil	2nd
2025-05-18	Shanghai, China	Individual Men's Foil	1st

=== World Cup ===
Year	Location	Event	Position
2019-05-05	Saint Petersburg, Russia	Team Men's Foil	2nd
2020-02-23	Cairo, Egypt	Team Men's Foil	3rd
2023-12-09	Tokoname, Japan	Individual Men's Foil	3rd
2023-12-10	Tokoname, Japan	Team Men's Foil	3rd
2024-05-04	Hong Kong	Team Men's Foil	1st
2025-12-06	Fukuoka, Japan	Individual Men's Foil	1st
2026-01-10	Paris, France	Individual Men's Foil	2nd
2026-01-11	Paris, France	Team Men's Foil	1st
2026-04-19	Cairo, Egypt	Team Men's Foil	2nd
2026-05-03	Istanbul, Turkey	Team Men's Foil	3rd

=== Asian Championship ===
Year	Location	Event	Position
2018	Bangkok, Thailand	Team Men's Foil	2nd
2019	Chiba, Japan	Team Men's Foil	3rd
2022	Seoul, South Korea	Individual Men's Foil	3rd
2022	Seoul, South Korea	Team Men's Foil	3rd
2023	Wuxi, China	Team Men's Foil	3rd
2024	Kuwait City, Kuwait	Team Men's Foil	3rd
2025	Bali, Indonesia	Individual Men's Foil	1st
2025	Bali, Indonesia	Team Men's Foil	3rd
2026	(India) New Delhi, Insia	Team Men's Foil	2nd
