= Filippo Macchi =

Italian fencer (born 2001)

Personal information
- Born: 19 September 2001 (age 25) Pontedera, Italy

Fencing career
- Sport: Fencing
- Country: Italy
- Weapon: Foil
Medal record
Men's foil
Representing Italy
Olympic Games
Silver medal – second place	2024 Paris	Individual
Silver medal – second place	2024 Paris	Team
World Championships
Gold medal – first place	2025 Tbilisi	Team
Gold medal – first place	2026 Hong Kong	Team
Silver medal – second place	2026 Hong Kong	Individual
European Games
Gold medal – first place	2023 Kraków–Małopolska	Team
European Championships
Gold medal – first place	2023 Plovdiv	Individual
Gold medal – first place	2023 Kraków	Team
Gold medal – first place	2025 Genoa	Team
Gold medal – first place	2026 Antony	Team
Bronze medal – third place	2024 Basel	Team

Filippo Macchi (born 19 September 2001) is an Italian foil fencer. He won two silver medals—one in the individual competition and one in the team event—at the 2024 Olympics.

== Biography ==
Macchi competed in the Men's foil tournament at the 2024 Summer Olympics, winning silver in individual play. He also won the silver medal in the team competition for Italy, which defeated the United States in the semifinal before losing to Japan in the gold medal match. This was Italy's first Olympic medal in men's team foil since 2012.

== Medal record ==
=== Olympic Games ===
Year	Location	Event	Position
2024	Paris, France	Individual Men's Foil	2nd

=== World championship ===
Year	Location	Event	Position
2025	(Georgia (country)) Tbilisi, Georgia	Team Men's Foil	1st
