= Kazuki Iimura =

Japanese fencer (born 2003)

Personal information
- Native name: 飯村一輝
- Born: 27 December 2003 (age 22) Kyoto, Japan

Fencing career
- Sport: Fencing
- Country: Japan
- Weapon: Foil
- Hand: right-handed
- National coach: Erwann Le Pechoux
- FIE ranking: current ranking
Medal record
Men's foil
Representing Japan
Olympic Games
Gold medal – first place	2024 Paris	Team
World Championships
Gold medal – first place	2023 Milan	Team
Bronze medal – third place	2026 Hong Kong	Individual
Junior World Championships
Gold medal – first place	2022 Dubai	Individual
Bronze medal – third place	2023 Plovdiv	Team
Asian Games
Gold medal – first place	2026 Aichi–Nagoya	Individual
Gold medal – first place	2026 Aichi–Nagoya	Team
Asian Championships
Gold medal – first place	2023 Wuxi	Team
Gold medal – first place	2022 Seoul	Team
Silver medal – second place	2024 Kuwait City	Individual
Bronze medal – third place	2024 Kuwait City	Team

Kazuki Iimura (born 27 December 2003) is a Japanese foil fencer. He qualified for the 2024 Summer Olympics.
