= Leszek Rajski =

Polish fencer (born 1983)

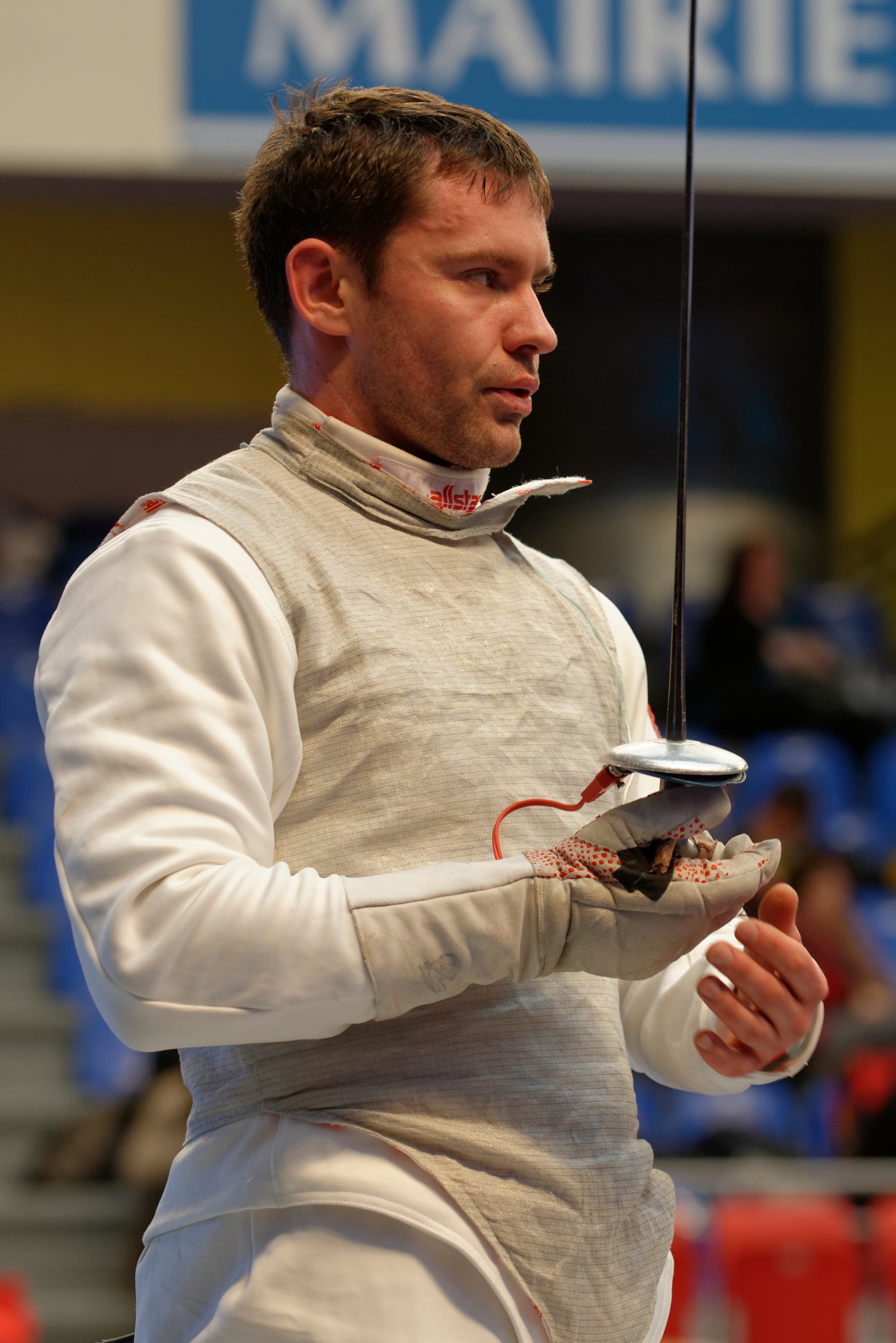
- Rajski at the 2014 Paris World Cup

Personal information
- Nationality: Polish
- Born: 25 November 1983 (age 42) Tarnów
- Height: 1.78 m (5 ft 10 in)
- Weight: 80 kg (180 lb; 13 st)

Fencing career
- Sport: Fencing
- Weapon: Foil
- Hand: right-handed
- Club: KSz Wrocławianie
- Head coach: Krzysztof Głowacki
- FIE ranking: current ranking
Medal record
Men's foil
Representing Poland
Silver medal – second place	2013 Zagreb	Team
Bronze medal – third place	2018 Novi Sad	Team
Bronze medal – third place	2022 Antalya	Team

Leszek Rajski (born 25 November 1983) is a Polish foil fencer, team silver medallist in the 2013 European Fencing Championships.

Rajski joined the Poland senior foil team in 2010. That same year he won the Poland national championship. With Michał Majewski, Paweł Kawiecki, and Radosław Glonek, he reached the final of the 2013 European Fencing Championships in Zagreb, but Poland could not overcome Germany and came away with a silver medal. Rajski's best individual result is a place in the table of 16 at the 2014 World Championships in Kazan, where he lost to reigning European champion James-Andrew Davis.

He trains at the Wrocław Wrocławianie club. He is the individual Polish champion from 2010, 2014, 2017, 2019 and 2020 and the team champion of Poland from 2009, 2010, 2011, 2012, 2013, 2014, 2017, 2018 and 2019. In addition, in 2008, 2011 and 2018 he won the bronze medal of the Polish championship in individual tournament, and in 2008 and 2020 a bronze medal at the Polish championship in the team tournament. His greatest success in the international arena is the European vice-championship in the team tournament in 2013 (in the individual tournament he was 18). He also competed at the world championships in 2010 (10 place in Team and 65 place individually), 2011 (4 place in Team and 32 place individually), 2013 (11 place in Team and 23 place in Individual) and 2014 (10 place in Team and 32 place individually) and the European Championships in 2010 (4 place in teams, 6 place individually), 2011 (13 place individually), 2012 (5 place in teams and 46 individually) and 2014 (4 place individually). in teams and 37 place individually).
