= Vladislav Mylnikov =

Russian Olympic foil fencer

Personal information
- Nationality: (Russia) Russian
- Born: September 12, 2000 (age 26)
- Home town: Kurchatov, Kursk Oblast, Russia

Fencing career
- Sport: Fencing
- Country: Russia
- Weapon: Foil
- FIE ranking: current ranking
Medal record
Men's foil
Representing Individual Neutral Athletes
European Championships
Bronze medal – third place	2025 Genoa	Team
Representing (Russia) ROC
Olympic Games
Silver medal – second place	2020 Tokyo	Team
Representing Russia
Junior World Championships
Gold medal – first place	2018 Verona	Team
Gold medal – first place	2019 Toruń	Team
Silver medal – second place	2019 Toruń	Individual

Vladislav Valeryevich Mylnikov (Russian: Владислав Валерьевич Мыльников, IPA: [vlədʲɪˈslaf vɐˈlʲerʲjɪvʲɪtɕ ˈmɨlʲnʲɪkəf]), born 12 September 2000) is a Russian left-handed foil fencer and 2021 team Olympic silver medalist.

== Medal record ==
=== Olympic Games ===
Year	Location	Event	Position
2021	Tokyo, Japan	Team Men's Foil	2nd

=== World Cup ===
Date	Location	Event	Position
2022-02-25	Cairo, Egypt	Individual Men's Foil	2nd
