= Kirill Borodachev =

Russian Olympic foil fencer

Personal information
- Nationality: (Russia) Russian
- Born: 23 March 2000 (age 26) Samara, Russia

Fencing career
- Sport: Fencing
- Country: Russia
- Weapon: Foil
- Club: Samara Regional Sports School of Olympic Reserve No.5 [RUS]; Central Sports Army Club [RUS].
- FIE ranking: current ranking
Medal record
Men's foil
Representing Individual Neutral Athletes
World Championships
Silver medal – second place	2025 Tbilisi	Individual
European Championships
Bronze medal – third place	2025 Genoa	Team
Representing (Russia) ROC
Olympic Games
Silver medal – second place	2020 Tokyo	Team
Representing Russia
Junior World Championships
Gold medal – first place	2018 Verona	Team
Gold medal – first place	2019 Toruń	Individual
Gold medal – first place	2019 Toruń	Team
Bronze medal – third place	2017 Plovdiv	Team
Cadet World Championships
Gold medal – first place	2017 Plovdiv	Individual

Kirill Viktorovich Borodachev (Russian: Кирилл Викторович Бородачёв, IPA: [kʲɪˈrʲiɫ bərədɐˈtɕɵf]), born 23 March 2000) is a Russian left-handed foil fencer and 2021 team Olympic silver medalist. He is a Russian Armed Forces athlete, and his clubs are the Samara Regional Sports School of Olympic Reserve No.5 [RUS], and the Central Sports Army Club [RUS].

== Medal record ==
=== Olympic Games ===
Year	Location	Event	Position
2021	Tokyo, Japan	Team Men's Foil	2nd
