= Maxime Pauty =

French fencer

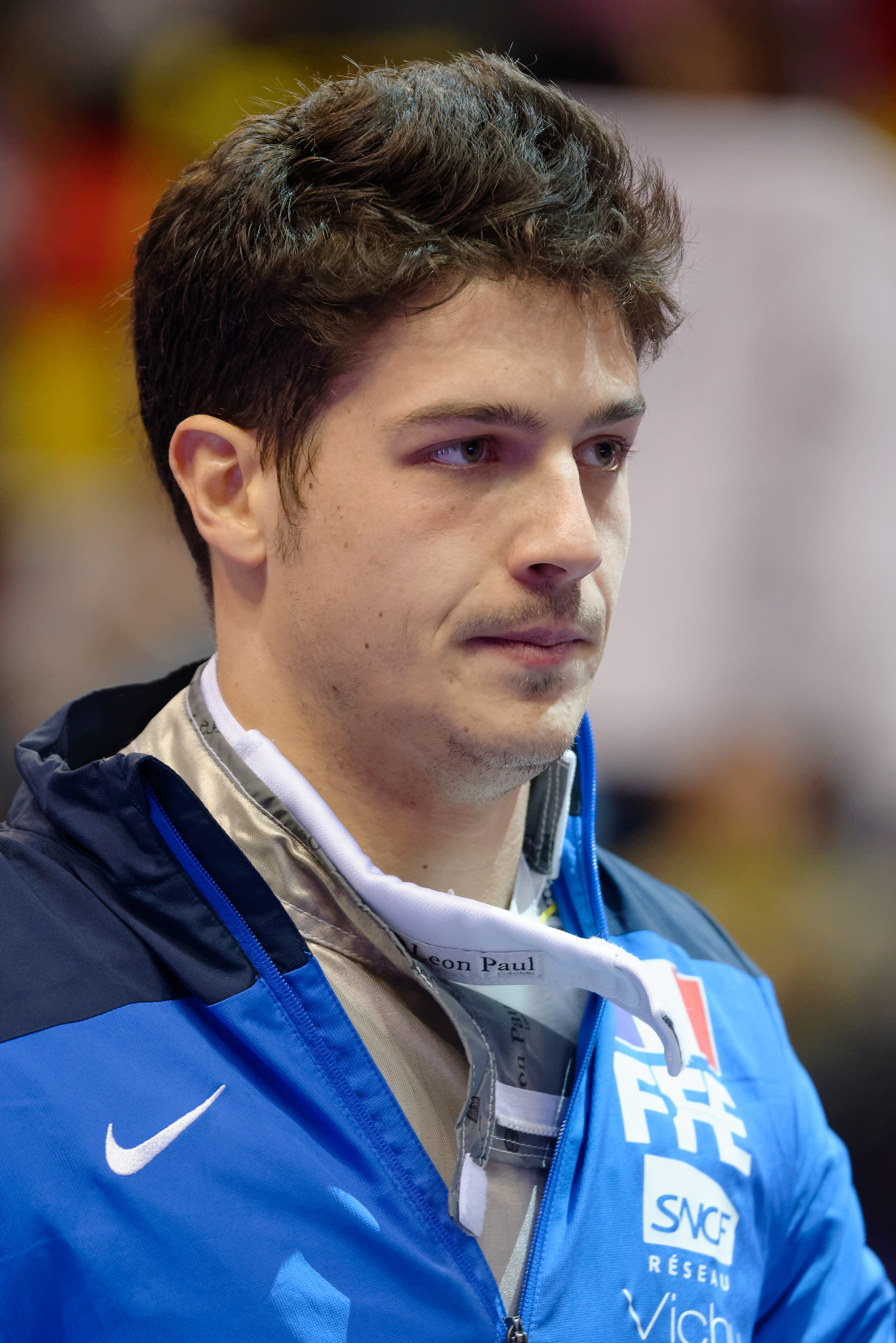
- Pauty in 2016

Personal information
- Full name: Maxime Dimitri Pauty
- Born: June 20, 1993 (age 33) Clamart, France

Fencing career
- Sport: Fencing
- Country: France
- Weapon: Foil
- Hand: right-handed
- Club: Issy Mousquetaire
- FIE ranking: current ranking
Medal record
Men's foil
Representing France
Olympic Games
Gold medal – first place	2020 Tokyo	Team
Bronze medal – third place	2024 Paris	Team
World Championships
Silver medal – second place	2019 Budapest	Team
Bronze medal – third place	2025 Tbilisi	Individual
European Games
Silver medal – second place	2023 Kraków–Małopolska	Team
European Championships
Gold medal – first place	2019 Düsseldorf	Team
Gold medal – first place	2024 Basel	Team
Silver medal – second place	2023 Kraków	Team
Silver medal – second place	2025 Genoa	Team
Silver medal – second place	2026 Antony	Team
Bronze medal – third place	2024 Basel	Individual

Maxime Dimitri Pauty (born 20 June 1993) is a French right-handed foil fencer, 2019 team European champion, and 2021 team Olympic champion.

== Medal record ==
=== Olympic Games ===
Year	Location	Event	Position
2021	Tokyo, Japan	Team Men's Foil	1st

=== World Championship ===
Year	Location	Event	Position
2019	Budapest, Hungary	Team Men's Foil	2nd
2025	(Georgia (country)) Tbilisi, Georgia	Individual Men's Foil	3rd

=== European Championship ===
Year	Location	Event	Position
2019	Düsseldorf, Germany	Team Men's Foil	1st

=== World Cup ===
Date	Location	Event	Position
05/04/2018	St. Petersburg, Russia	Individual Men's Foil	1st
12/13/2019	Tokyo, Japan	Individual Men's Foil	2nd
