= Alexander Choupenitch =

Czech fencer (born 1994)

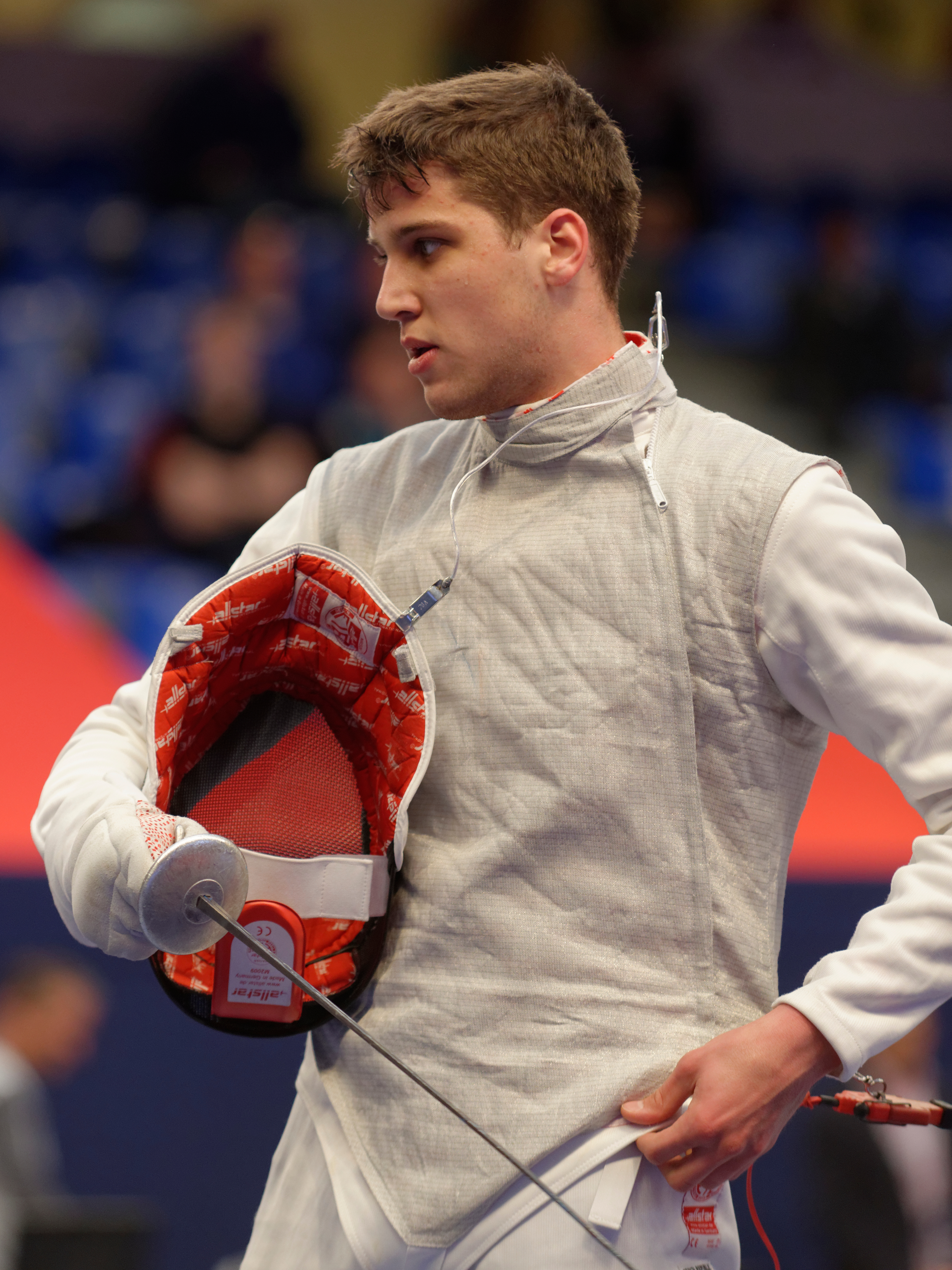
- Choupenitch at the 2014 Paris World Cup

Personal information
- Nationality: Czech
- Born: 2 May 1994 (age 32) Brno, Czech Republic
- Home town: Brno
- Height: 1.96 m (6 ft 5 in)
- Weight: 90 kg (198 lb)

Fencing career
- Sport: Fencing
- Country: Czech Republic
- Weapon: foil
- Hand: right-handed
- Club: Sokol Brno 1
- FIE ranking: current ranking
Medal record
Men's foil
Representing Czech Republic
Olympic Games
Bronze medal – third place	2020 Tokyo	Individual
World Championships
Gold medal – first place	2026 Hong Kong	Individual
European Championships
Bronze medal – third place	2018 Novi Sad	Individual
Bronze medal – third place	2024 Basel	Individual

Alexander Choupenitch (Czech pronunciation: [ˈalɛksandr̩ ˈʃupɛɲɪtʃ]; born 2 May 1994) is a Czech right-handed foil fencer. He is a three-time Olympian, and 2021 individual Olympic bronze medalist.

== Early life ==
Choupenitch is the son of Belarusian-born opera singers who both worked at National Theatre Brno. The unusual form of his name – Choupenitch instead of Šupenič – is due to the fact that papers issued to his parents for travelling through Europe used a French spelling.

His first sport, basketball, left him frustrated as he seldom got to touch the ball, so his mother took him to the fencing section of Sokol Brno when he was eight. He later learnt that his step-grandmother, Tatyana Petrenko-Samusenko, was a three-time Olympic foil champion for the USSR. Foil was the only option offered at the club, but he later explained that foil is indeed his favourite weapon, being the more realistic and striking the best balance between sabre's speed and épée's tactics. His first coach was Dmitri Romankov, who also trained Belarusian fencer Siarhei Byk.

Choupenitch's other favourite sports are association football and ice hockey. He also plays the piano. Choupenitch interrupted his studies at the Masaryk University in Brno to focus on sport, and gained a sponsorship from Red Bull in 2015.

== Career ==
At the beginning of the 2013–14 season Choupenitch transferred from Sokol Brno to CS Fides in Livorno, Italy, to train under Paolo Paoletti. He reached the final at the A Coruña World Cup before being defeated by China's Ma Jianfei and ended up with a silver medal. His victory during the tournament over Olympic champion Andrea Baldini encouraged him to believe he could become a champion in his own right. A few weeks later, he lost against Ma Jianfei in the Venice Grand Prix, this time in the semi-final, and took a bronze medal.

In the 2014–15 season, Choupenitch won a silver medal at the Shanghai Grand Prix, losing in the final to the USA's Miles Chamley-Watson. He also represented the Czech Republic at the 2024 Summer Olympics, where he was eliminated in the round of 16 by Italy's Guillaume Bianchi.

== Personal life ==
Choupenitch can speak Czech, English, Italian, and Russian. He also releases rap music apart from fencing.

Choupenitch is married to the swimmer Barbora Seemanová, a multiple-time European champion and Olympian. The couple first publicly confirmed their relationship in December 2025 in an interview for the Czech edition of Forbes. The two also decided to jointly take over the management of their sporting careers, including their marketing rights and finances. In September 2026, Seemanová announced on social media that she had married Choupenitch.

== Medal record ==
=== Olympic Games ===
Year	Location	Event	Position
2021	Tokyo, Japan	Individual Men's Foil	3rd

=== European Championship ===
Year	Location	Event	Position
2018	Novi Sad, Serbia	Individual Men's Foil	3rd
2024	Basel, Switzerland	Individual Men's Foil	3rd

=== Grand Prix ===
Date	Location	Event	Position
15 March 2014	Venice, Italy	Individual Men's Foil	3rd
15 May 2015	Shanghai, China	Individual Men's Foil	2nd

=== World Cup ===
Date	Location	Event	Position
21 February 2014	A Coruña, Spain	Individual Men's Foil	2nd
