= 2024–25 Fencing World Cup =

International fencing competition

- Edition: 54th Fencing World Cup
- Duration: November 2024 – May 2025
- Organiser: FIE

The 54th FIE Fencing World Cup event began in November 2024 and will conclude in May 2025.

== Senior ==
=== Men's individual épée ===
Color key

- World Cup

Date	Event	Type	Gold	Silver	Bronze
8 November 2024	Coupe du Monde, Bern	World Cup	Máté Tamás Koch (HUN)	Giacomo Paolini (ITA)	Matteo Galassi (ITA); Zhang Xinkun (CHN)
22 November 2024	Coupe du Monde, Vancouver	World Cup	Yuval Shalom Freilich (ISR)	Eugeni Gavalda (ESP)	Dylan French (CAN); Ho Wai Hang (HKG)
6 February 2025	Coupe du Monde, Heidenheim	World Cup	Davide Di Veroli (ITA)	Tibor Andrásfi (HUN)	Mohamed Elsayed (EGY); Volodymyr Stankevych (UKR)
27 March 2025	Coupe du Monde, Marrakesh	World Cup	Gergely Siklosi (HUN)	Jakub Jurka (CZE)	Davide Di Veroli (ITA); Samuel Imrek (USA)
23 May 2025	Coupe du Monde, Saint-Maur	World Cup	Alexandre Bardenet (FRA)	Gaetan Billa (FRA)	Davide Di Veroli (ITA); Oleg Knysh (USA)

=== Women's individual épée ===
Color key

- World Cup

Date	Event	Type	Gold	Silver	Bronze
8 November 2024	Coupe du Monde, Fujairah	World Cup	Sara Maria Kowalczyk (ITA)	Giulia Rizzi (ITA)	Irina Embrich (EST); Lauren Rembi (FRA)
21 November 2024	Coupe du Monde, Vancouver	World Cup	Song Se-ra (KOR)	Katrina Lehis (EST)	Nelli Differt (EST); Hsieh Kaylin Sin Yan (HKG)
7 February 2025	Coupe du Monde, Barcelona	World Cup	Eszter Muhari (HUN)	Song Se-ra (KOR)	Rossella Fiamingo (ITA); Lucrezia Paulis (ITA)
27 March 2025	Coupe du Monde, Marrakesh	World Cup	Eszter Muhari (HUN)	Aizanat Murtazaeva (ANA)	Hadley Husisian (USA); Katrina Lehis (EST)
23 May 2025	Coupe du Monde, Wuxi	World Cup	Alexandra Louis-Marie (FRA)	Song Se-ra (KOR)	Vlada Kharkova (UKR); Xu Nuo (CHN)

=== Men's individual foil ===
Color key

- World Cup

Date	Event	Type	Gold	Silver	Bronze
22 November 2024	Coupe du Monde, Tunis	World Cup	Alexander Massialas (USA)	Bryce Louie (USA)	Alexander Choupenitch (CZE); Mohamed Hamza (EGY)
6 December 2024	Coupe du Monde, Takasaki	World Cup	Alessio Foconi (ITA)	Filippo Macchi (ITA)	Cheung Ka Long (HKG); Alexander Massialas (USA)
10 January 2025	Coupe du Monde, Paris	World Cup	Alessio Foconi (ITA)	Alexander Massialas (USA)	Alexander Choupenitch (CZE); Carlos Llavador (ESP)
7 March 2025	Coupe du Monde, Cairo	World Cup	Guillaume Bianchi (ITA)	Alexander Choupenitch (CZE)	Gerek Meinhardt (USA); Youn Jeong-hyun (KOR)
2 May 2025	Coupe du Monde, Vancouver	World Cup	Alexander Massialas (USA)	Davide Filippi (ITA)	Maxime Pauty (FRA); Abdelrahman Tolba (EGY)

=== Women's individual foil ===
Color key

- World Cup

Date	Event	Type	Gold	Silver	Bronze
21 November 2024	Coupe du Monde, Tunis	World Cup	Martina Favaretto (ITA)	Arianna Errigo (ITA)	Eleanor Harvey (CAN); Julia Walczyk-Klimaszyk (POL)
5 December 2024	Coupe du Monde, Busan	World Cup	Elena Tangherlini (ITA)	Eleanor Harvey (CAN)	Anna Cristino (ITA); Yuka Ueno (JPN)
10 January 2025	Coupe du Monde, Hong Kong	World Cup	Jaelyn Liu (USA)	Martina Sinigalia (ITA)	Martina Batini (ITA); Yuka Ueno (JPN)
6 March 2025	Coupe du Monde, Cairo	World Cup	Eleanor Harvey (CAN)	Martina Batini (ITA)	Martina Favaretto (ITA); Eva Lacheray (FRA)
1 May 2025	Coupe du Monde, Vancouver	World Cup	Martina Favaretto (ITA)	Lee Kiefer (USA)	Arianna Errigo (ITA); Eleanor Harvey (CAN)

=== Men's individual sabre ===
Color key

- World Cup

Date	Event	Type	Gold	Silver	Bronze
7 November 2024	Coupe du Monde, Oran	World Cup	Sebastien Patrice (FRA)	Radu Nitu (ROU)	Santiago Madrigal] (ESP); Park Sang-won (KOR)
24 January 2025	Coupe du Monde, Plovdiv	World Cup	Oh Sang-uk (KOR)	Sebastien Patrice (FRA)	Sandro Bazadze (GEO); Park Sang-won (KOR)
6 March 2025	Coupe du Monde, Padua	World Cup	Jean-Philippe Patrice (FRA)	Michele Gallo (ITA)	Ziad Elsissy (EGY); Oh Sang-uk (KOR)
28 March 2025	Coupe du Monde, Budapest	World Cup	Sebastien Patrice (FRA)	Matyas Szabo (GER)	Sandro Bazadze (GEO); Ha Han-sol (KOR)
23 May 2025	Coupe du Monde, Madrid	World Cup	Sandro Bazadze (GEO)	Enver Yildirim (TUR)	Do Gyeong-dong (KOR); Park Sang-won (KOR)

=== Women's individual sabre ===
Color key

- World Cup

Date	Event	Type	Gold	Silver	Bronze
8 November 2024	Coupe du Monde, Oran	World Cup	Jeon Ha-young (KOR)	Lucia Martin-Portugues (ESP)	Sugar Katinka Battai (HUN); Celia Perez Cuenca (ESP)
23 January 2025	Coupe du Monde, Plovdiv	World Cup	Yoana Ilieva (BUL)	Chiara Mormile (ITA)	Despina Georgiadou (GRE); Lucia Martin-Portugues (ESP)
7 March 2025	Coupe du Monde, Heraklion	World Cup	Misaki Emura (JPN)	Yoana Ilieva (BUL)	Sugar Katinka Battai (HUN); Sarah Noutcha (FRA)
28 March 2025	Coupe du Monde, Cairo	World Cup	Despina Georgiadou (GRE)	Sarah Noutcha (FRA)	Misaki Emura (JPN); Yoana Ilieva (BUL)
23 May 2025	Coupe du Monde, Lima	World Cup	Misaki Emura (JPN)	Araceli Navarro (ESP)	Nisanur Erbil (TUR); Luca Szucs (HUN)

=== Men's team épée ===
Color key

- World Cup

Date	Event	Type	Gold	Silver	Bronze
10 November 2024	Coupe du Monde par équipes, Bern	World Cup	Hungary	Japan	France
24 November 2024	Coupe du Monde par équipes, Vancouver	World Cup	Hungary	Japan	Kazakhstan
8 February 2025	Coupe du Monde par équipes, Heidenheim	World Cup	Japan	Israel	Switzerland
30 March 2025	Coupe du Monde par équipes, Marrakesh	World Cup	Hungary	Italy	France
25 May 2025	Coupe du Monde par équipes, Saint-Maur	World Cup	Japan	Switzerland	China

=== Women's team épée ===
Color key

- World Cup

Date	Event	Type	Gold	Silver	Bronze
10 November 2024	Coupe du Monde par équipes, Fujairah	World Cup	Estonia	Italy	United States
24 November 2024	Coupe du Monde par équipes, Vancouver	World Cup	South Korea	Ukraine	France
9 February 2025	Coupe du Monde par équipes, Barcelona	World Cup	Italy	China	South Korea
30 March 2025	Coupe du Monde par équipes, Marrakesh	World Cup	China	Estonia	France
25 May 2025	Coupe du Monde par équipes, Wuxi	World Cup	Poland	Italy	United States

=== Men's team foil ===
Color key

- World Cup

Date	Event	Type	Gold	Silver	Bronze
24 November 2024	Coupe du Monde par équipes, Tunis	World Cup	Italy	United States	France
8 December 2024	Coupe du Monde par équipes, Takasaki	World Cup	Italy	United States	France
12 January 2025	Coupe du Monde par équipes, Paris	World Cup	Italy	Japan	United States
9 March 2025	Coupe du Monde par équipes, Cairo	World Cup	Italy	United States	France
4 May 2025	Coupe du Monde par équipes, Vancouver	World Cup	United States	Italy	France

=== Women's team foil ===
Color key

- World Cup

Date	Event	Type	Gold	Silver	Bronze
24 November 2024	Coupe du Monde par équipes, Tunis	World Cup	Japan	Ukraine	South Korea
7 December 2024	Coupe du Monde par équipes, Busan	World Cup	Italy	United States	France
12 January 2025	Coupe du Monde par équipes, Hong Kong	World Cup	Italy	United States	France
9 March 2025	Coupe du Monde par équipes, Cairo	World Cup	Italy	United States	France
4 May 2025	Coupe du Monde par équipes, Vancouver	World Cup	Italy	United States	Japan

=== Men's team sabre ===
Color key

- World Cup

Date	Event	Type	Gold	Silver	Bronze
10 November 2024	Coupe du Monde par équipes, Oran	World Cup	South Korea	Iran	Italy
26 January 2025	Coupe du Monde par équipes, Plovdiv	World Cup	France	United States	South Korea
8 March 2025	Coupe du Monde par équipes, Padua	World Cup	France	United States	South Korea
30 March 2025	Coupe du Monde par équipes, Budapest	World Cup	Egypt	Hungary	United States
25 May 2025	Coupe du Monde par équipes, Madrid	World Cup	France	Hungary	Romania

=== Women's team sabre ===
Color key

- World Cup

Date	Event	Type	Gold	Silver	Bronze
10 November 2024	Coupe du Monde par équipes, Oran	World Cup	Hungary	Poland	South Korea
26 January 2025	Coupe du Monde par équipes, Plovdiv	World Cup	Japan	Hungary	France
9 March 2025	Coupe du Monde par équipes, Heraklion	World Cup	China	France	South Korea
30 March 2025	Coupe du Monde par équipes, Cairo	World Cup	France	Hungary	South Korea
25 May 2025	Coupe du Monde par équipes, Lima	World Cup	France	Japan	Hungary

== Junior ==
=== Men's individual épée ===
Color key

- World Cup

Date	Event	Type	Gold	Silver	Bronze
2 November 2024	Coupe du Monde, San Salvador	World Cup	Simon Lizoznyansky (USA)	Samuel Imrek (USA)	Alexander Liu (USA); Nathaniel Wimmer (USA)
16 November 2024	Coupe du Monde, San José	World Cup	Cador Beautyman (GBR)	Isaac Dorati (PAN)	Jake Mann (USA); Artemios Tzovanis (GRE)
30 November 2024	Coupe du Monde, Hong Kong	World Cup	Nathaniel Wimmer (USA)	Gabidin Mustafin (KAZ)	Philip Kang (USA); Peng Sheng wei (CHN)
14 December 2024	Coupe du Monde, Lagos	World Cup	Youssef Shamel (EGY)	Hassan Abed (KSA)	Eslam Osama (EGY); Mahmoud Elsayed (EGY)
4 January 2025	Coupe du Monde, Basel	World Cup	Samuel Imrek (USA)	Ole Petersen (GER)	Tristan Lumineau (GBR); Zoltan Csaszar (HUN)
17 January 2025	Coupe du Monde, Manama	World Cup	Noam Duchene (FRA)	Nikita Gorin (ANA)	Oliver Laasik (EST); Gabidin Mustafin (KAZ)
1 February 2025	Coupe du Monde, Cairo	World Cup	Matteo Galassi (ITA)	Maksym Perchuk (UKR)	Mikolaj Adamczyk (POL); James Sennewald (USA)
15 February 2025	Coupe du Monde, Vrsac	World Cup	Rahim Rashaida (BUL)	Theo Mitrail (FRA)	Odinn Bindas (FRA); Domonkos Pelle (HUN)

=== Women's individual épée ===
Color key

- World Cup

Date	Event	Type	Gold	Silver	Bronze
1 November 2024	Coupe du Monde, San Salvador	World Cup	Victoria Guerrero Hidalgo (VEN)	Alanis C. Waller Del Valle (PUR)	Maria Tuozzo Tortolero (VEN); Sofia Echeverry (COL)
15 November 2024	Coupe du Monde, San José	World Cup	Victoria Guerrero Hidalgo (VEN)	Simone Combatti (CHI)	Ekaterine Bautista (MEX); Alanis C. Waller Del Valle (PUR)
29 November 2024	Coupe du Monde, Hong Kong	World Cup	Sumin Lee (USA)	Elizabeth Zigalo (USA)	Galina Krymova (ANA); Oliwia Tercjak (POL)
14 December 2024	Coupe du Monde, Burgos	World Cup	Anna Maksymenko (UKR)	Greta Gachalyi (HUN)	Cecylia Cieslik (POL); Emma Sont (ROU)
4 January 2025	Coupe du Monde, Udine	World Cup	Anna Maksymenko (UKR)	Leehi Machulsky (USA)	Silvia Gomez Lopez (ESP); Eva Steffens (GER)
18 January 2025	Coupe du Monde, Manama	World Cup	Aleyna Erturk (TUR)	Sofia Barsukova (ANA)	Anastasiia Rustamova (ANA); Esther Tan (SGP)
31 January 2025	Coupe du Monde, Cairo	World Cup	Blanka Virag Nagy (HUN)	Sarah Gu (USA)	Sumin Lee (USA); Farah Mahfouz (EGY)
15 February 2025	Coupe du Monde, Beauvais	World Cup	Li Xinyao (CHN)	Ni Qiyao (CHN)	Linnea Eriksson (SWE); Xie Yuchen (CHN)

=== Men's individual foil ===
Color key

- World Cup

Date	Event	Type	Gold	Silver	Bronze
1 November 2024	Coupe du Monde, Istanbul	World Cup	Antoine Spichiger (FRA)	Mattia De Cristofaro (ITA)	Keyon Loo (SGP); Pavel Puzankov (ANA)
15 November 2024	Coupe du Monde, Lima	World Cup	Cheng Tit Nam (HKG)	Conrad Lo (USA)	Richard Li (USA); Choi Ji woo (KOR)
1 December 2024	Coupe du Monde, Bogotá	World Cup	Abdelrahman Tolba (EGY)	Owen Traugot (USA)	Yanni Tsimiklis (GRE); Maximo Azuela (MEX)
13 December 2024	Coupe du Monde, Bangkok	World Cup	Jaimie Cook (GBR)	Abdelrahman Tolba (EGY)	David Sosnov (GBR); Matteo Iacomoni (ITA)
3 January 2025	Coupe du Monde, Fujairah	World Cup	Abdelrahman Tolba (EGY)	Jaimie Cook (GBR)	Zou Tianyi (CHN); Michael Yuen Chi Shun (HKG)
18 January 2025	Coupe du Monde, Heraklion	World Cup	Richard Li (USA)	Jayden Hooshi (USA)	Elia Pasin (ITA); Andor Kolos Zsogon (HUN)
31 January 2025	Coupe du Monde, Zagreb	World Cup	Abdelrahman Tolba (EGY)	Pavel Puzankov (ANA)	Lam Ho Long (HKG); David Sosnov (GBR)
15 February 2025	Coupe du Monde, Tashkent	World Cup	Matteo Iacomoni (ITA)	Nicolo' Collini (ITA)	Andrea Zanardo (ITA); Ulugbek Usmanov (UZB)

=== Women's individual foil ===
Color key

- World Cup

Date	Event	Type	Gold	Silver	Bronze
2 November 2024	Coupe du Monde, Istanbul	World Cup	Letizia Gabola (ITA)	Polina Volobueva (ANA)	Mikayla Chusid (USA); Victoria Pevzner (USA)
16 November 2024	Coupe du Monde, Lima	World Cup	Anna Kollar (HUN)	Beatrice Pia Maria Bibite (ITA)	Georgina Morales (MEX); Mariana Soriano (PER)
30 November 2024	Coupe du Monde, Bogotá	World Cup	Rafaela Santibanez (CHI)	Wang Yiran (CHN)	Sloane Elizabeth Paulus (PHI); Natalia Machado Leal (VEN)
14 December 2024	Coupe du Monde, Bangkok	World Cup	Jaelyn Liu (USA)	Matilde Molinari (ITA)	Nadia Hayes (CAN); Rino Nagase (JPN)
4 January 2025	Coupe du Monde, Fujairah	World Cup	Sofiya Aktayeva (KAZ)	Tie Zhihe (CHN)	Adeline Senic (MDA); Anna Kollar (HUN)
18 January 2025	Coupe du Monde, Tbilisi	World Cup	Matilde Molinari (ITA)	Victoria Pevzner (USA)	Nadia Hayes (CAN); Jazmin Papp (HUN)
1 February 2025	Coupe du Monde, Zagreb	World Cup	Jaelyn Liu (USA)	Katerina Lung (USA)	Ludovica Franzoni (ITA); Jiao Enqi (CHN)
14 February 2025	Coupe du Monde, Tashkent	World Cup	Zhuang Xinyi (CHN)	Ludovica Franzoni (ITA)	Vittoria Pinna (ITA); Alicia Audibert (FRA)

=== Men's individual sabre ===
Color key

- World Cup

Date	Event	Type	Gold	Silver	Bronze
16 November 2024	Coupe du Monde, Tashkent	World Cup	Islambek Abdazov (UZB)	Zuhriddin Kodirov (UZB)	Oszkar Vajda (HUN); Adem Doruk Kupeli (TUR)
29 November 2024	Coupe du Monde, Hammamet	World Cup	Benedykt Denkiewicz (POL)	Edoardo Reale (ITA)	Cosimo Bertini (ITA); Pavel Graudyn (ANA)
14 December 2024	Coupe du Monde, Dormagen	World Cup	Ahmed Hesham (EGY)	Zsadany Papp (HUN)	Edoardo Reale (ITA); Leonardo Reale (ITA)
4 January 2025	Coupe du Monde, Bogotá	World Cup	Musa Aymuratov (UZB)	Sardor Abdukarimbekov (UZB)	Alpamis Urakboev (UZB); Erico Patto (BRA)
18 January 2025	Coupe du Monde, Boston	World Cup	Vlad Covaliu (ROU)	Emilio Paturzo Gonzalez (USA)	Daniel Holz (USA); Silas Choi (USA)
31 January 2025	Coupe du Monde, Plovdiv	World Cup	Zuhriddin Kodirov (UZB)	Cody Walter Ji (USA)	Enes Talha Kalender (TUR); Furkan Yaman (TUR)
15 February 2025	Coupe du Monde, Almaty	World Cup	Adem Doruk Kupeli (TUR)	Nurmukhammed Zhailybay (KAZ)	Kainazar Nurkatuly (KAZ); Enes Talha Kalender (TUR)

=== Women's individual sabre ===
Color key

- World Cup

Date	Event	Type	Gold	Silver	Bronze
1 November 2024	Coupe du Monde, Busan	World Cup	Pan Qi miao (CHN)	Joo Ye bin (KOR)	Chen Ying (CHN); Gulistan Perdibaeva (UZB)
15 November 2024	Coupe du Monde, Tashkent	World Cup	Luisa Fernanda Herrera (UZB)	Polina Mishakina (ANA)	Polina Konya (HUN); Mariia Tretiakova (ANA)
30 November 2024	Coupe du Monde, Hammamet	World Cup	Mariella Viale (ITA)	Magda Skarbonkiewicz (USA)	Emma Neikova (BUL); Siobhan Sullivan (USA)
14 December 2024	Coupe du Monde, Budapest	World Cup	Rao xue yi (CHN)	Gulistan Perdibaeva (UZB)	Alexandra Kuvaeva (GEO); Mitsuki Suto (JPN)
3 January 2025	Coupe du Monde, Bogotá	World Cup	Gabriela Maria Lin Hwang (PUR)	Ana Beatriz Fraga (BRA)	Vanessa Chavez (MEX); Samira Shokirova (UZB)
17 January 2025	Coupe du Monde, Boston	World Cup	Brynnley Mckee (USA)	Sophie Liu (USA)	Alexandra Lee (USA); Keira Lauri (USA)
1 February 2025	Coupe du Monde, Tbilisi	World Cup	Samira Shokirova (UZB)	Mariella Viale (ITA)	Zsanett Kovacs (HUN); Aleksandra Mikhailova (ANA)
14 February 2025	Coupe du Monde, Almaty	World Cup	Gulistan Perdibaeva (UZB)	Ayakoz Jumamuratova (UZB)	Samira Shokirova (UZB); Adema Serikbay (KAZ)

=== Men's team épée ===
Color key

- World Cup

Date	Event	Type	Gold	Silver	Bronze
3 November 2024	Coupe du Monde par équipes, San Salvador	World Cup	United States	Chinese Taipei	Mexico
17 November 2024	Coupe du Monde par équipes, San José	World Cup	Germany	Mexico	Greece
1 December 2024	Coupe du Monde par équipes, Hong Kong	World Cup	China	Kazakhstan	Hong Kong
15 December 2024	Coupe du Monde par équipes, Lagos	World Cup	Egypt	Greece	Saudi Arabia
5 January 2025	Coupe du Monde par équipes, Basel	World Cup	Egypt	Kazakhstan	Italy
19 January 2025	Coupe du Monde par équipes, Manama	World Cup	Kazakhstan	France	Egypt
2 February 2025	Coupe du Monde par équipes, Cairo	World Cup	Egypt	United States	Hungary
16 February 2025	Coupe du Monde par équipes, Vrsac	World Cup	Israel	Germany	Italy

=== Women's team épée ===
Color key

- World Cup

Date	Event	Type	Gold	Silver	Bronze
3 November 2024	Coupe du Monde par équipes, San Salvador	World Cup	Venezuela	Puerto Rico	Paraguay
17 November 2024	Coupe du Monde par équipes, San José	World Cup	Puerto Rico	Mexico	Chile
1 December 2024	Coupe du Monde par équipes, Hong Kong	World Cup	United States	Poland	France
15 December 2024	Coupe du Monde par équipes, Burgos	World Cup	Hungary	Poland	United States
5 January 2025	Coupe du Monde par équipes, Udine	World Cup	China	France	Italy
19 January 2025	Coupe du Monde par équipes, Manama	World Cup	Turkey	Hong Kong	Uzbekistan
2 February 2025	Coupe du Monde par équipes, Cairo	World Cup	Hungary	Ukraine	United States
16 February 2025	Coupe du Monde par équipes, Beauvais	World Cup	China	Italy	Sweden

=== Men's team foil ===
Color key

- World Cup

Date	Event	Type	Gold	Silver	Bronze
3 November 2024	Coupe du Monde par équipes, Istanbul	World Cup	United States	United Kingdom	France
17 November 2024	Coupe du Monde par équipes, Lima	World Cup	United States	Hungary	Mexico
2 December 2024	Coupe du Monde par équipes, Bogotá	World Cup	Mexico	United States	Ecuador
15 December 2024	Coupe du Monde par équipes, Bangkok	World Cup	China	Hong Kong	United States
5 January 2025	Coupe du Monde par équipes, Fujairah	World Cup	United Kingdom	China	South Korea
19 January 2025	Coupe du Monde par équipes, Heraklion	World Cup	United Kingdom	United States	Italy
2 February 2025	Coupe du Monde par équipes, Zagreb	World Cup	Italy	Hong Kong	United Kingdom
16 February 2025	Coupe du Monde par équipes, Tashkent	World Cup	Italy	China	Egypt

=== Women's team foil ===
Color key

- World Cup

Date	Event	Type	Gold	Silver	Bronze
3 November 2024	Coupe du Monde par équipes, Istanbul	World Cup	United States	Italy	France
17 November 2024	Coupe du Monde par équipes, Lima	World Cup	Hungary	Mexico	Peru
2 December 2024	Coupe du Monde par équipes, Bogotá	World Cup	Mexico	Venezuela	Colombia
15 December 2024	Coupe du Monde par équipes, Bangkok	World Cup	United States	Canada	Japan
5 January 2025	Coupe du Monde par équipes, Fujairah	World Cup	China	Singapore	Kazakhstan
19 January 2025	Coupe du Monde par équipes, Tbilisi	World Cup	Italy	United States	France
2 February 2025	Coupe du Monde par équipes, Zagreb	World Cup	Italy	China	United States
16 February 2025	Coupe du Monde par équipes, Tashkent	World Cup	Italy	China	France

=== Men's team sabre ===
Color key

- World Cup

Date	Event	Type	Gold	Silver	Bronze
17 November 2024	Coupe du Monde par équipes, Tashkent	World Cup	Uzbekistan	Kazakhstan	Hungary
1 December 2024	Coupe du Monde par équipes, Hammamet	World Cup	Turkey	United States	Italy
15 December 2024	Coupe du Monde par équipes, Dormagen	World Cup	Italy	United States	Turkey
5 January 2025	Coupe du Monde par équipes, Bogotá	World Cup	Uzbekistan	Colombia	Venezuela
19 January 2025	Coupe du Monde par équipes, Boston	World Cup	United States	France	Canada
1 February 2025	Coupe du Monde par équipes, Plovdiv	World Cup	Turkey	Italy	Hong Kong
16 February 2025	Coupe du Monde par équipes, Almaty	World Cup	Kazakhstan	Uzbekistan	Turkey

=== Women's team sabre ===
Color key

- World Cup

Date	Event	Type	Gold	Silver	Bronze
2 November 2024	Coupe du Monde par équipes, Busan	World Cup	South Korea	Uzbekistan	Hong Kong
1 December 2024	Coupe du Monde par équipes, Hammamet	World Cup	Italy	Germany	Hong Kong
15 December 2024	Coupe du Monde par équipes, Budapest	World Cup	Hungary	Uzbekistan	United Kingdom
5 January 2025	Coupe du Monde par équipes, Bogotá	World Cup	Uzbekistan	Mexico	Colombia
19 January 2025	Coupe du Monde par équipes, Boston	World Cup	United States	France	Canada
2 February 2025	Coupe du Monde par équipes, Tbilisi	World Cup	Uzbekistan	Hungary	France
16 February 2025	Coupe du Monde par équipes, Almaty	World Cup	Uzbekistan	Kazakhstan	Bulgaria
