= Men's sabre at the 2025 World Fencing Championships =

- Venue: Olympic Palace
- Location: Tbilisi, Georgia
- Dates: 24 July (preliminaries); 25 July (finals)
- Competitors: 64 from 23 nations

Medalists
| gold medal | Sandro Bazadze | Georgia |
| silver medal | Jean-Philippe Patrice | France |
| bronze medal | Ahmed Hesham | Egypt |
| bronze medal | Luca Curatoli | Italy |

The Men's sabre competition at the 2025 World Fencing Championships was held on 24 and 25 July 2025.

== Draw ==
=== Finals ===
Semifinals
(Egypt) Ahmed Hesham | 10
(Georgia (country)) Sandro Bazadze | 14
(France) Jean-Philippe Patrice | 15
(Italy) Luca Curatoli | 13

Final
(Georgia (country)) Sandro Bazadze | 15
(France) Jean-Philippe Patrice | 9

=== Top half ===
==== Section 1 ====
Round of 64
(Tunisia) Farès Ferjani | 15
(Hong Kong) Hugo Ho | 6
(South Korea) Ha Han-sol | 15
(Japan) Shido Tsumori | 13
(Romania) Vlad Covaliu | 15
(Germany) Philipp Methner | 9
(Italy) Pietro Torre | 15
(Canada) Fares Arfa | 13
(Germany) Matyas Szabo | 15
(Ukraine) Andriy Yahodka | 8
(Egypt) Ahmed Hesham | 15
(Japan) Kento Yoshida | 8
(Turkey) Enver Yıldırım | 15
(Kazakhstan) Artyom Sarkissyan | 13
(South Korea) Lim Jae-yoon | 14
(China) Shen Chenpeng | 15

Round of 32
(Tunisia) Farès Ferjani | 15
(South Korea) Ha Han-sol | 10
(Romania) Vlad Covaliu | 14
(Italy) Pietro Torre | 15
(Germany) Matyas Szabo | 9
(Egypt) Ahmed Hesham | 15
(Turkey) Enver Yıldırım | 15
(China) Shen Chenpeng | 14

Round of 16
(Tunisia) Farès Ferjani | 13
(Italy) Pietro Torre | 15
(Egypt) Ahmed Hesham | 15
(Turkey) Enver Yıldırım | 14

Quarterfinals
(Italy) Pietro Torre | 8
(Egypt) Ahmed Hesham | 15

==== Section 2 ====
Round of 64
(South Korea) Park Sang-won | 11
(Poland) Szymon Hryciuk | 15
(Hungary) András Szatmári | 15
(Uzbekistan) Zuhriddin Kodirov | 12
(Germany) Frederic Kindler | 15
(Spain) Yago Morán | 7
(Kazakhstan) Bakdaulet Kuralbekuly | 8
(Egypt) Ziad El-Sissy | 15
(Egypt) Mohamed Amer | 15
(Tunisia) Ahmed Ferjani | 10
(Japan) Kaito Streets | 15
(Iran) Mohammad Fotouhi | 9
(United States) William Morrill | 15
(Romania) Radu Nitu | 10
(Poland) Krzysztof Kaczkowski | 7
(Georgia (country)) Sandro Bazadze | 15

Round of 32
(Poland) Szymon Hryciuk | 15
(Hungary) András Szatmári | 12
(Germany) Frederic Kindler | 13
(Egypt) Ziad El-Sissy | 15
(Egypt) Mohamed Amer | 15
(Japan) Kaito Streets | 10
(United States) William Morrill | 11
(Georgia (country)) Sandro Bazadze | 15

Round of 16
(Poland) Szymon Hryciuk | 12
(Egypt) Ziad El-Sissy | 15
(Egypt) Mohamed Amer | 11
(Georgia (country)) Sandro Bazadze | 15

Quarterfinals
(Egypt) Ziad El-Sissy | 13
(Georgia (country)) Sandro Bazadze | 15

=== Bottom half ===
==== Section 3 ====
Round of 64
(France) Jean-Philippe Patrice | 15
(China) Luo Shaotong | 7
(United States) Mitchell Saron | 14
(Spain) Santiago Madrigal | 15
(Iran) Ali Pakdaman | 15
(Turkey) Furkan Yaman | 8
(Thailand) Voragun Srinualnad | 13
(Egypt) Adham Moataz | 15
(France) Rémi Garrigue | 15
Kamil Ibragimov | 10
(Uzbekistan) Musa Aymuratov | 13
(France) Maxime Pianfetti | 15
(United States) Antonio Heathcock | 11
(Japan) Mao Kokubo | 15
(Hong Kong) Low Ho Tin | 4
(United States) Colin Heathcock | 15

Round of 32
(France) Jean-Philippe Patrice | 15
(Spain) Santiago Madrigal | 12
(Iran) Ali Pakdaman | 15
(Egypt) Adham Moataz | 11
(France) Rémi Garrigue | 15
(France) Maxime Pianfetti | 9
(Japan) Mao Kokubo | 13
(United States) Colin Heathcock | 15

Round of 16
(France) Jean-Philippe Patrice | 15
(Iran) Ali Pakdaman | 13
(France) Rémi Garrigue | 15
(United States) Colin Heathcock | 10

Quarterfinals
(France) Jean-Philippe Patrice | 15
(France) Rémi Garrigue | 14

==== Section 4 ====
Round of 64
(Italy) Luca Curatoli | 15
(United Kingdom) Jonathan Webb | 13
(Italy) Matteo Neri | 14
(China) Lin Xiao | 15
(Hungary) Krisztián Rabb | 15
(Georgia (country)) Beka Bazadze | 13
(Ukraine) Oleksiy Statsenko | 12
(Italy) Michele Gallo | 15
(South Korea) Do Gyeong-dong | 15
(Canada) Olivier Desrosiers | 6
(Turkey) Tolga Aslan | 7
(Hungary) Áron Szilágyi | 15
(Romania) George Dragomir | 8
Pavel Graudyn | 15
(Ukraine) Yuriy Tsap | 5
(France) Sébastien Patrice | 15

Round of 32
(Italy) Luca Curatoli | 15
(China) Lin Xiao | 6
(Hungary) Krisztián Rabb | 15
(Italy) Michele Gallo | 7
(South Korea) Do Gyeong-dong | 8
(Hungary) Áron Szilágyi | 15
Pavel Graudyn | 14
(France) Sébastien Patrice | 9

Round of 16
(Italy) Luca Curatoli | 15
(Hungary) Krisztián Rabb | 8
(Hungary) Áron Szilágyi | 15
Pavel Graudyn | 14

Quarterfinals
(Italy) Luca Curatoli | 15
(Hungary) Áron Szilágyi | 12
