= 2023 European Fencing Championships =

- Host city: (Bulgaria) Plovdiv
- Dates: 16–18 June 2023
- Main venue: Kolodruma

The 2023 European Fencing Championships was a fencing competition that took place from 16 to 18 June 2023 in Plovdiv, Bulgaria. This edition of the championships only featured individual events, as the team events took place at the 2023 European Games. The points awarded in this championship were valid for Olympic qualification.

== Schedule ==
●	Opening Ceremony	●	Finals	●	Closing Ceremony

June	16	17	18	Total
Ceremonies	●		●	
Foil Individual	Women		Men	2
Épée Individual	Men	Women		2
Sabre Individual		Men	Women	2
Total Gold Medals	2	2	2	6

== Medal summary ==
=== Men's events ===
Event	Gold	Silver	Bronze
Foil	Filippo Macchi; Italy	Enzo Lefort; France	Guillaume Bianchi; Italy
Foil	Filippo Macchi; Italy	Enzo Lefort; France	Rafael Savin; France
Épée	Davide Di Veroli; Italy	Federico Vismara; Italy	Mateusz Antkiewicz; Poland
Épée	Davide Di Veroli; Italy	Federico Vismara; Italy	Marco Brinkmann; Germany
Sabre	Sandro Bazadze; Georgia	András Szatmári; Hungary	Enver Yıldırım; Turkey
Sabre	Sandro Bazadze; Georgia	András Szatmári; Hungary	Sébastien Patrice; France

=== Women's events ===
Event	Gold	Silver	Bronze
Foil	Martina Batini; Italy	Martina Favaretto; Italy	Alice Volpi; Italy
Foil	Martina Batini; Italy	Martina Favaretto; Italy	Francesca Palumbo; Italy
Épée	Alexandra Louis-Marie; France	Mara Navarria; Italy	Nelli Differt; Estonia
Épée	Alexandra Louis-Marie; France	Mara Navarria; Italy	Auriane Mallo-Breton; France
Sabre	Manon Brunet; France	Sara Balzer; France	Theodora Gkountoura; Greece
Sabre	Manon Brunet; France	Sara Balzer; France	Martina Criscio; Italy

=== Medal table ===
* Host nation (Bulgaria)

Rank	Nation	Gold	Silver	Bronze	Total
1	Italy	3	3	4	10
2	France	2	2	3	7
3	Georgia	1	0	0	1
4	Hungary	0	1	0	1
5	Estonia	0	0	1	1
5	Germany	0	0	1	1
5	Greece	0	0	1	1
5	Poland	0	0	1	1
5	Turkey	0	0	1	1
Totals (9 entries)		6	6	12	24

== Results ==
=== Men ===
==== Foil individual ====
Position	Name	Country
1st place, gold medalist(s)	Filippo Macchi	Italy
2nd place, silver medalist(s)	Enzo Lefort	France
3rd place, bronze medalist(s)	Guillaume Bianchi	Italy
3rd place, bronze medalist(s)	Rafael Savin	France
5.	Daniele Garozzo	Italy
6.	Alexander Kahl	Germany
7.	Alessio Foconi	Italy
8.	James Davis	United Kingdom

Round of 16
1	(France) Enzo Lefort	15
49	(Ukraine) Klod Yunes	5
24	(United Kingdom) James Davis	15
25	(Cyprus) Alex Tofalides	6
5	(Poland) Leszek Rajski	8
12	(France) Rafael Savin	15
13	(Hungary) Dániel Dósa	11
4	(Italy) Daniele Garozzo	15
3	(Italy) Guillaume Bianchi	15
19	(Poland) Andrzej Rządkowski	8
11	(Germany) Alexander Kahl	15
6	(Belgium) Stef Van Campenhout	13
7	(United Kingdom) Marcus Mepstead	8
10	(Italy) Filippo Macchi	15
18	(Italy) Alessio Foconi	15
2	(Poland) Michał Siess	8

Quarter-finals
1	(France) Enzo Lefort	15
24	(United Kingdom) James Davis	9
12	(France) Rafael Savin	15
4	(Italy) Daniele Garozzo	9
3	(Italy) Guillaume Bianchi	15
11	(Germany) Alexander Kahl	8
10	(Italy) Filippo Macchi	15
18	(Italy) Alessio Foconi	9

Semi-finals
1	(France) Enzo Lefort	15
12	(France) Rafael Savin	10
3	(Italy) Guillaume Bianchi	13
10	(Italy) Filippo Macchi	15

Final
1	(France) Enzo Lefort	14
10	(Italy) Filippo Macchi	15

==== Épée individual ====
Position	Name	Country
1st place, gold medalist(s)	Davide Di Veroli	Italy
2nd place, silver medalist(s)	Federico Vismara	Italy
3rd place, bronze medalist(s)	Mateusz Antkiewicz	Poland
3rd place, bronze medalist(s)	Marco Brinkmann	Germany
5.	Tibor Andrásfi	Hungary
6.	Jonathan Svensson	Sweden
7.	Yordan Galabov	Bulgaria
8.	David Van Nunen	Netherlands

Round of 16
64	(Switzerland) Hadrien Favre	11
16	(Hungary) Tibor Andrásfi	15
9	(Germany) Marco Brinkmann	15
25	(Switzerland) Max Heinzer	14
5	(Germany) Fabian Herzberg	9
21	(Italy) Davide Di Veroli	15
20	(Sweden) Jonathan Svensson	15
29	(Israel) Yuval Freilich	13
30	(Italy) Federico Vismara	15
14	(Poland) Maciej Bielec	12
43	(Netherlands) David Van Nunen	15
38	(Denmark) Patrick Jørgensen	10
7	(Austria) Alexander Biro	11
23	(Poland) Mateusz Antkiewicz	15
15	(Hungary) Dávid Nagy	12
31	(Bulgaria) Yordan Galabov	15

Quarter-finals
16	(Hungary) Tibor Andrásfi	14
9	(Germany) Marco Brinkmann	15
21	(Italy) Davide Di Veroli	15
20	(Sweden) Jonathan Svensson	8
30	(Italy) Federico Vismara	14
43	(Netherlands) David Van Nunen	9
23	(Poland) Mateusz Antkiewicz	15
31	(Bulgaria) Yordan Galabov	8

Semi-finals
9	(Germany) Marco Brinkmann	12
21	(Italy) Davide Di Veroli	15
30	(Italy) Federico Vismara	15
23	(Poland) Mateusz Antkiewicz	7

Final
21	(Italy) Davide Di Veroli	15
30	(Italy) Federico Vismara	14

==== Sabre individual ====
Position	Name	Country
1st place, gold medalist(s)	Sandro Bazadze	Georgia
2nd place, silver medalist(s)	András Szatmári	Hungary
3rd place, bronze medalist(s)	Enver Yıldırım	Turkey
3rd place, bronze medalist(s)	Sébastien Patrice	France
5.	Matyas Szabo	Germany
6.	Krzysztof Kaczkowski	Poland
7.	Boladé Apithy	France
8.	Maxime Pianfetti	France

Round of 16
1	(Georgia (country)) Sandro Bazadze	15
16	(Romania) Razvan Ursachi	10
9	(France) Boladé Apithy	15
8	(Georgia (country)) Beka Bazadze	6
28	(France) Maxime Pianfetti	15
12	(Romania) George Dragomir	14
20	(Italy) Michele Gallo	8
4	(Turkey) Enver Yıldırım	15
3	(Germany) Matyas Szabo	15
14	(Spain) Santiago Madrigal	12
22	(Italy) Matteo Neri	9
6	(France) Sébastien Patrice	15
7	(Poland) Krzysztof Kaczkowski	15
10	(Italy) Luca Curatoli	13
15	(Italy) Luigi Samele	10
2	(Hungary) András Szatmári	15

Quarter-finals
1	(Georgia (country)) Sandro Bazadze	15
9	(France) Boladé Apithy	7
28	(France) Maxime Pianfetti	12
4	(Turkey) Enver Yıldırım	15
3	(Germany) Matyas Szabo	13
6	(France) Sébastien Patrice	15
7	(Poland) Krzysztof Kaczkowski	9
2	(Hungary) András Szatmári	15

Semi-finals
1	(Georgia (country)) Sandro Bazadze	15
4	(Turkey) Enver Yıldırım	7
6	(France) Sébastien Patrice	14
2	(Hungary) András Szatmári	15

Final
1	(Georgia (country)) Sandro Bazadze	15
2	(Hungary) András Szatmári	11

=== Women ===
==== Foil individual ====
Position	Name	Country
1st place, gold medalist(s)	Martina Batini	Italy
2nd place, silver medalist(s)	Martina Favaretto	Italy
3rd place, bronze medalist(s)	Alice Volpi	Italy
3rd place, bronze medalist(s)	Francesca Palumbo	Italy
5.	Julia Walczyk-Klimaszyk	Poland
6.	Morgane Patru	France
7.	Ariadna Castro	Spain
8.	Hanna Łyczbińska	Poland

Round of 16
1	(Italy) Martina Batini	15
17	(Spain) Maria Mariño	7
9	(France) Pauline Ranvier	13
25	(Spain) Ariadna Castro	15
37	(Poland) Hanna Łyczbińska	15
21	(Ukraine) Alina Poloziuk	12
20	(Israel) Lior Druck	5
4	(Italy) Francesca Palumbo	15
3	(Poland) Julia Walczyk-Klimaszyk	15
14	(Germany) Leonie Ebert	14
11	(France) Ysaora Thibus	11
6	(Italy) Martina Favaretto	15
7	(France) Anita Blaze	14
10	(France) Morgane Patru	15
15	(United Kingdom) Carolina Stutchbury	14
2	(Italy) Alice Volpi	15

Quarter-finals
1	(Italy) Martina Batini	15
25	(Spain) Ariadna Castro	4
37	(Poland) Hanna Łyczbińska	8
4	(Italy) Francesca Palumbo	15
3	(Poland) Julia Walczyk-Klimaszyk	8
6	(Italy) Martina Favaretto	15
10	(France) Morgane Patru	7
2	(Italy) Alice Volpi	15

Semi-finals
1	(Italy) Martina Batini	15
4	(Italy) Francesca Palumbo	12
6	(Italy) Martina Favaretto	15
2	(Italy) Alice Volpi	9

Final
1	(Italy) Martina Batini	WO
6	(Italy) Martina Favaretto

==== Épée individual ====
Position	Name	Country
1st place, gold medalist(s)	Alexandra Louis-Marie	France
2nd place, silver medalist(s)	Mara Navarria	Italy
3rd place, bronze medalist(s)	Nelli Differt	Estonia
3rd place, bronze medalist(s)	Auriane Mallo-Breton	France
5.	Anna Kun	Hungary
6.	Marie-Florence Candassamy	France
7.	Kristina Kuusk	Estonia
8.	Angela Krieger	Switzerland

Round of 16
32	(Estonia) Nelli Differt	14
49	(Belgium) Aube Vandingenen	12
9	(France) Marie-Florence Candassamy	15
25	(Italy) Federica Isola	10
5	(Italy) Mara Navarria	14
21	(Poland) Kamila Pytka	8
45	(Hungary) Jazmin Toth	9
36	(Switzerland) Angela Krieger	10
3	(Hungary) Anna Kun	15
46	(France) Coraline Vitalis	14
43	(Germany) Alexandra Ehler	6
6	(France) Auriane Mallo-Breton	15
7	(Italy) Rossella Fiamingo	10
23	(Estonia) Kristina Kuusk	11
15	(France) Alexandra Louis-Marie	14
2	(Poland) Renata Knapik-Miazga	13

Quarter-finals
32	(Estonia) Nelli Differt	15
9	(France) Marie-Florence Candassamy	8
5	(Italy) Mara Navarria	15
36	(Switzerland) Angela Krieger	13
3	(Hungary) Anna Kun	12
6	(France) Auriane Mallo-Breton	13
23	(Estonia) Kristina Kuusk	5
15	(France) Alexandra Louis-Marie	15

Semi-finals
32	(Estonia) Nelli Differt	10
5	(Italy) Mara Navarria	15
6	(France) Auriane Mallo-Breton	13
15	(France) Alexandra Louis-Marie	15

Final
5	(Italy) Mara Navarria	8
15	(France) Alexandra Louis-Marie	15

==== Sabre individual ====
Position	Name	Country
1st place, gold medalist(s)	Manon Brunet	France
2nd place, silver medalist(s)	Sara Balzer	France
3rd place, bronze medalist(s)	Theodora Gkountoura	Greece
3rd place, bronze medalist(s)	Martina Criscio	Italy
5.	Sabina Karimova	Azerbaijan
6.	Yoana Ilieva	Bulgaria
7.	Caitlin Maxwell	United Kingdom
8.	Julika Funke	Germany

Round of 16
1	(France) Manon Brunet	15
17	(Hungary) Liza Pusztai	10
24	(Germany) Julika Funke	15
25	(Azerbaijan) Palina Kaspiarovich	13
5	(Greece) Theodora Gkountoura	15
12	(Poland) Małgorzata Kozaczuk	14
13	(Italy) Michela Battiston	8
4	(Bulgaria) Yoana Ilieva	15
3	(Azerbaijan) Sabina Karimova	15
14	(France) Cécilia Berder	10
11	(Italy) Martina Criscio	15
27	(Poland) Sylwia Matuszak	9
7	(France) Sara Balzer	15
23	(Georgia (country)) Lika Jijieishvili	13
18	(United Kingdom) Caitlin Maxwell	15
34	(Poland) Angelika Wator	11

Quarter-finals
1	(France) Manon Brunet	15
24	(Germany) Julika Funke	7
5	(Greece) Theodora Gkountoura	15
4	(Bulgaria) Yoana Ilieva	13
3	(Azerbaijan) Sabina Karimova	11
11	(Italy) Martina Criscio	15
7	(France) Sara Balzer	15
18	(United Kingdom) Caitlin Maxwell	10

Semi-finals
1	(France) Manon Brunet	15
5	(Greece) Theodora Gkountoura	14
11	(Italy) Martina Criscio	10
7	(France) Sara Balzer	15

Final
1	(France) Manon Brunet	15
7	(France) Sara Balzer	10
