= Fencing at the 2023 European Games =

Group of 12 events at the 2023 European games

- Venue: Tauron Arena Kraków
- Dates: 25–30 June
- Competitors: 477 from 39 nations

At the 2023 European Games in Kraków, twelve events of fencing were contested, six for men and six for women.

== Medal table ==
* Host nation (Poland)

Rank	NOC	Gold	Silver	Bronze	Total
1	France	3	2	0	5
2	Italy	2	2	3	7
3	Poland*	2	2	0	4
4	Ukraine	2	0	1	3
5	Hungary	1	2	3	6
6	Georgia	1	0	0	1
6	Netherlands	1	0	0	1
8	Romania	0	1	1	2
9	Denmark	0	1	0	1
9	Portugal	0	1	0	1
9	Switzerland	0	1	0	1
12	Germany	0	0	5	5
13	Belgium	0	0	1	1
13	Great Britain	0	0	1	1
13	Greece	0	0	1	1
13	Israel	0	0	1	1
13	Spain	0	0	1	1
Totals (17 entries)		12	12	18	42

== Medal summary ==
=== Men's ===
Event	Gold	Silver	Bronze
Individual épée	Tristan Tulen; Netherlands	Miguel Frazão; Portugal	Volodymyr Stankevych; Ukraine Manuel Bargues; Spain
Team épée	Hungary; Tibor Andrásfi; Máté Tamás Koch; Dávid Nagy; Gergely Siklósi	Switzerland; Alexis Bayard; Théo Brochard; Hadrien Favre; Max Heinzer	Italy; Gabriele Cimini; Davide Di Veroli; Andrea Santarelli; Federico Vismara
Individual foil	Michał Siess; Poland	Jonas Winterberg-Poulsen; Denmark	Stef Van Campenhout; Belgium Laurenz Rieger; Germany
Team foil	Italy; Alessio Foconi; Daniele Garozzo; Filippo Macchi; Tommaso Marini	France; Alexandre Ediri; Enzo Lefort; Maxime Pauty; Rafael Savin	Germany; Paul Luca Faul; Alexander Kahl; Luis Klein; Laurenz Rieger
Individual sabre	Sandro Bazadze; Georgia	Krzysztof Kaczkowski; Poland	Áron Szilágyi; Hungary William Deary; Great Britain
Team sabre	France; Boladé Apithy; Sébastien Patrice; Maxime Pianfetti; Tom Seitz	Italy; Luca Curatoli; Michele Gallo; Matteo Neri; Luigi Samele	Germany; Raoul Bonah; Lorenz Kempf; Frederic Kindler; Matyas Szabo

=== Women's ===
Event	Gold	Silver	Bronze
Individual épée	Dzhoan Feybi Bezhura; Ukraine	Martyna Swatowska-Wenglarczyk; Poland	Anna Kun; Hungary Alexandra Ehler; Germany
Team épée	France; Marie-Florence Candassamy; Alexandra Louis-Marie; Auriane Mallo-Breton; Coraline Vitalis	Hungary; Lili Büki; Anna Kun; Eszter Muhari; Dorina Wimmer	Italy; Rossella Fiamingo; Federica Isola; Mara Navarria; Alberta Santuccio
Individual foil	Julia Walczyk-Klimaszyk; Poland	Flóra Pásztor; Hungary	Mălina Călugăreanu; Romania Gili Kuritzky; Israel
Team foil	Italy; Martina Batini; Martina Favaretto; Francesca Palumbo; Alice Volpi	France; Anita Blaze; Morgane Patru; Pauline Ranvier; Ysaora Thibus	Germany; Leandra Behr; Aliya Dhuique-Hein; Leonie Ebert; Anne Sauer
Individual sabre	Olga Kharlan; Ukraine	Ilinca Pantiș; Romania	Theodora Gkountoura; Greece Eloisa Passaro; Italy
Team sabre	France; Manon Apithy-Brunet; Sara Balzer; Cécilia Berder; Margaux Rifkiss	Italy; Martina Criscio; Rossella Gregorio; Chiara Mormile; Eloisa Passaro	Hungary; Sugár Katinka Battai; Renáta Katona; Liza Pusztai; Luca Szűcs
