= 2025 European Fencing Championships =

Fencing competition in Genoa, Italy

- Host city: (Italy) Genoa
- Dates: 14–19 June
- Main venue: Palasport di Genova
- Website: Official website

The 2025 European Fencing Championships were held from 14 to 19 June 2025 in Genoa, Italy.

== Schedule ==
●	Opening Ceremony	●	Finals	●	Closing Ceremony

June	14	15	16	17	18	19	Total
Ceremonies	●					●	
Foil Individual	Women		Men				2
Épée Individual		Men	Women				2
Sabre Individual	Men	Women					2
Foil Team				Women		Men	2
Épée Team					Men	Women	2
Sabre Team				Men	Women		2
Total Gold Medals	2	2	2	2	2	2	12

== Medal summary ==
=== Men's events ===
Event	Gold	Silver	Bronze
Foil	Guillaume Bianchi; Italy	Anas Anane; France	Carlos Llavador; Spain
Foil	Guillaume Bianchi; Italy	Anas Anane; France	Tommaso Marini; Italy
Épée	Roman Svichkar; Ukraine	Matteo Galassi; Italy	Gergely Siklósi; Hungary
Épée	Roman Svichkar; Ukraine	Matteo Galassi; Italy	Andrea Santarelli; Italy
Sabre	Rémi Garrigue; France	Áron Szilágyi; Hungary	Jean-Philippe Patrice; France
Sabre	Rémi Garrigue; France	Áron Szilágyi; Hungary	Frederic Kindler; Germany
Team foil	Italy; Guillaume Bianchi; Alessio Foconi; Filippo Macchi; Tommaso Marini	France; Anas Anane; Pierre Loisel; Maxime Pauty; Rafael Savin	Individual Neutral Athletes; Anton Borodachev; Kirill Borodachev; Aleksandr Kerik; Vladislav Mylnikov
Team épée	France; Paul Allègre; Alexandre Bardenet; Gaëtan Billa; Luidgi Midelton	Netherlands; Rafael Tulen; Tristan Tulen; David van Nunen; Konrad Veenenbos	Italy; Gianpaolo Buzzachino; Davide Di Veroli; Matteo Galassi; Andrea Santarelli
Team sabre	Hungary; Nikolász Iliász; Krisztián Rabb; András Szatmári; Áron Szilágyi	Italy; Luca Curatoli; Michele Gallo; Matteo Neri; Pietro Torre	Individual Neutral Athletes; Dmitriy Danilenko; Pavel Graudyn; Anatoliy Kostenko; Kirill Tiuliukov

=== Women's events ===
Event	Gold	Silver	Bronze
Foil	Eva Lacheray; France	Carolina Stutchbury; Great Britain	Martina Batini; Italy
Foil	Eva Lacheray; France	Carolina Stutchbury; Great Britain	Flóra Pásztor; Hungary
Épée	Aizanat Murtazaeva; Individual Neutral Athletes	Katrina Lehis; Estonia	Sara Maria Kowalczyk; Italy
Épée	Aizanat Murtazaeva; Individual Neutral Athletes	Katrina Lehis; Estonia	Alberta Santuccio; Italy
Sabre	Sarah Noutcha; France	Alina Komashchuk; Ukraine	Sylwia Matuszak; Poland
Sabre	Sarah Noutcha; France	Alina Komashchuk; Ukraine	Sugár Katinka Battai; Hungary
Team foil	Italy; Martina Batini; Anna Cristino; Arianna Errigo; Alice Volpi	France; Anita Blaze; Eva Lacheray; Pauline Ranvier; Morgane Patru	Spain; Andrea Breteau; María Díaz; María Mariño; Ariadna Tucker
Team épée	Ukraine; Inna Brovko; Vlada Kharkova; Olena Kryvytska; Anna Maksymenko	Switzerland; Pauline Brunner; Angeline Favre; Aurore Favre; Fiona Hatz	Italy; Rossella Fiamingo; Lucrezia Paulis; Giulia Rizzi; Alberta Santuccio
Team sabre	France; Sara Balzer; Faustine Clapier; Sarah Noutcha; Toscane Tori	Poland; Zuzanna Cieślar; Zuzanna Lenkiewicz; Sylwia Matuszak; Angelika Wątor	Italy; Michela Battiston; Chiara Mormile; Manuela Spica; Mariella Viale

=== Medal table ===
* Host nation (Italy)

Rank	Nation	Gold	Silver	Bronze	Total
1	France	5	3	1	9
2	Italy*	3	2	8	13
3	Ukraine	2	1	0	3
4	Hungary	1	1	3	5
–	Individual Neutral Athletes	1	0	2	3
5	Poland	0	1	1	2
6	Estonia	0	1	0	1
6	Great Britain	0	1	0	1
6	Netherlands	0	1	0	1
6	Switzerland	0	1	0	1
10	Spain	0	0	2	2
11	Germany	0	0	1	1
Totals (11 entries)		12	12	18	42

== Results ==
=== Men ===
==== Foil individual ====
Position	Name	Country
1st place, gold medalist(s)	Guillaume Bianchi	Italy
2nd place, silver medalist(s)	Anas Anane	France
3rd place, bronze medalist(s)	Carlos Llavador	Spain
3rd place, bronze medalist(s)	Tommaso Marini	Italy
5.	Vladislav Mylnikov	Individual Neutral Athletes
6.	Michał Siess	Poland
7.	Dániel Dósa	Hungary
8.	Gergő Szemes	Hungary

Round of 16
1	(Italy) Guillaume Bianchi	15
48	(Czech Republic) Alexander Choupenitch	6
24	(Hungary) Dániel Dósa	15
8	(Italy) Filippo Macchi	13
5	(Authorised Neutral Athletes) Vladislav Mylnikov	15
21	(Authorised Neutral Athletes) Kirill Borodachev	11
13	(Spain) Carlos Llavador	15
4	(Belgium) Stef De Greef	8
30	(Authorised Neutral Athletes) Alexandr Kerik	10
19	(Poland) Michał Siess	15
11	(France) Anas Anane	15
6	(Authorised Neutral Athletes) Anton Borodachev	13
26	(Hungary) Gergő Szemes	15
23	(France) Pierre Loisel	7
18	(United Kingdom) Kamal Minott	8
2	(Italy) Tommaso Marini	15

Quarter-finals
1	(Italy) Guillaume Bianchi	15
24	(Hungary) Dániel Dósa	14
5	(Authorised Neutral Athletes) Vladislav Mylnikov	6
13	(Spain) Carlos Llavador	15
19	(Poland) Michał Siess	13
11	(France) Anas Anane	15
26	(Hungary) Gergő Szemes	10
2	(Italy) Tommaso Marini	15

Semi-finals
1	(Italy) Guillaume Bianchi	15
13	(Spain) Carlos Llavador	14
11	(France) Anas Anane	15
2	(Italy) Tommaso Marini	13

Final
1	(Italy) Guillaume Bianchi	15
11	(France) Anas Anane	5

==== Épée individual ====
Position	Name	Country
1st place, gold medalist(s)	Roman Svichkar	Ukraine
2nd place, silver medalist(s)	Matteo Galassi	Italy
3rd place, bronze medalist(s)	Gergely Siklósi	Hungary
3rd place, bronze medalist(s)	Andrea Santarelli	Italy
5.	Valerio Cuomo	Italy
6.	Egor Lomaga	Individual Neutral Athletes
7.	Alexis Bayard	Switzerland
8.	Ian Hauri	Switzerland

Round of 16
1	(Italy) Matteo Galassi	15
16	(Czech Republic) Michal Čupr	12
73	(Czech Republic) Matyas Pavlik	10
72	(Switzerland) Ian Hauri	15
5	(Italy) Valerio Cuomo	15
44	(Hungary) Máté Tamás Koch	14
45	(Italy) Andrea Santarelli	15
4	(Estonia) Sten Priinits	6
30	(Switzerland) Alexis Bayard	15
14	(Italy) Davide Di Veroli	10
22	(France) Gaëtan Billa	12
6	(Ukraine) Roman Svichkar	15
7	(Authorised Neutral Athletes) Egor Lomaga	15
10	(France) Alexandre Bardenet	14
47	(Poland) Wiktor Walach	14
2	(Hungary) Gergely Siklósi	15

Quarter-finals
1	(Italy) Matteo Galassi	15
72	(Switzerland) Ian Hauri	9
5	(Italy) Valerio Cuomo	9
45	(Italy) Andrea Santarelli	15
30	(Switzerland) Alexis Bayard	10
6	(Ukraine) Roman Svichkar	15
7	(Authorised Neutral Athletes) Egor Lomaga	6
2	(Hungary) Gergely Siklósi	15

Semi-finals
1	(Italy) Matteo Galassi	15
45	(Italy) Andrea Santarelli	8
6	(Ukraine) Roman Svichkar	6
2	(Hungary) Gergely Siklósi	5

Final
1	(Italy) Matteo Galassi	11
6	(Ukraine) Roman Svichkar	15

==== Sabre individual ====
Position	Name	Country
1st place, gold medalist(s)	Rémi Garrigue	France
2nd place, silver medalist(s)	Áron Szilágyi	Hungary
3rd place, bronze medalist(s)	Jean-Philippe Patrice	France
3rd place, bronze medalist(s)	Frederic Kindler	Germany
5.	Vlad Covaliu	Romania
6.	Michele Gallo	Italy
7.	Radu Nițu	Romania
8.	Sandro Bazadze	Georgia

Round of 16
1	(Germany) Matyas Szabo	11
16	(Georgia (country)) Sandro Bazadze	15
9	(Romania) George Dragomir	10
8	(Germany) Frederic Kindler	15
5	(Italy) Dario Cavaliere	14
12	(Romania) Radu Nițu	15
13	(France) Rémi Garrigue	15
29	(France) Maxime Pianfetti	10
3	(Romania) Vlad Covaliu	15
19	(France) Sébastien Patrice	8
22	(Authorised Neutral Athletes) Dmitriy Danilenko	10
6	(Hungary) Áron Szilágyi	15
7	(Authorised Neutral Athletes) Pavel Graudyn	13
10	(Italy) Michele Gallo	15
18	(France) Jean-Philippe Patrice	15
2	(Italy) Luca Curatoli	13

Quarter-finals
16	(Georgia (country)) Sandro Bazadze	14
8	(Germany) Frederic Kindler	15
12	(Romania) Radu Nițu	14
13	(France) Rémi Garrigue	15
3	(Romania) Vlad Covaliu	5
6	(Hungary) Áron Szilágyi	15
10	(Italy) Michele Gallo	9
18	(France) Jean-Philippe Patrice	15

Semi-finals
8	(Germany) Frederic Kindler	11
13	(France) Rémi Garrigue	15
6	(Hungary) Áron Szilágyi	15
18	(France) Jean-Philippe Patrice	9

Final
13	(France) Rémi Garrigue	15
6	(Hungary) Áron Szilágyi	11

==== Foil team ====
Position	Team	Fencers
1st place, gold medalist(s)	Italy	Guillaume Bianchi; Alessio Foconi; Filippo Macchi; Tommaso Marini
2nd place, silver medalist(s)	France	Anas Anane; Pierre Loisel; Maxime Pauty; Rafael Savin
3rd place, bronze medalist(s)	Individual Neutral Athletes	Anton Borodachev; Kirill Borodachev; Aleksandr Kerik; Vladislav Mylnikov
4.	Belgium	Stef De Greef; Oscar Guedvert; Mathieu Nijs; Stef Van Campenhout
5.	Hungary	Dániel Dósa; Andor Mihályi; Gergő Szemes; Gergely Tóth
6.	Poland	Jan Jurkiewicz; Mateusz Kozak; Leszek Rajski; Michał Siess
7.	Germany	Paul Faul; Alexander Kahl; Bastian Kappus; Laurenz Rieger
8.	Austria	Maximilian Ettelt; Alexander Hubner; Moritz Lechner; Tobias Reichetzer

Round of 16
1	Italy	Bye
–	–	–
9	Austria	45
8	Spain	33
5	United Kingdom	30
12	Individual Neutral Athletes	45
13	Croatia	38
4	Hungary	45
3	Poland	Bye
–	–	–
11	Israel	18
6	Belgium	45
7	Germany	45
10	Ukraine	37
2	France	Bye
–	–	–

Quarter-finals
1	Italy	45
9	Austria	26
12	Individual Neutral Athletes	45
4	Hungary	38
3	Poland	33
6	Belgium	45
7	Germany	29
2	France	45

Semi-finals
1	Italy	45
12	Individual Neutral Athletes	40
6	Belgium	41
2	France	45

Final
1	Italy	45
2	France	43
Bronze medal
12	Individual Neutral Athletes	45
6	Belgium	28

==== Épée team ====
Position	Team	Fencers
1st place, gold medalist(s)	France	Paul Allègre; Alexandre Bardenet; Gaëtan Billa; Luidgi Midelton
2nd place, silver medalist(s)	Netherlands	Rafael Tulen; Tristan Tulen; David van Nunen; Konrad Veenenbos
3rd place, bronze medalist(s)	Italy	Gianpaolo Buzzachino; Davide Di Veroli; Matteo Galassi; Andrea Santarelli
4.	Germany	Lukas Bellmann; Marco Brinkmann; Matthew Buelau; Ole Petersen
5.	Hungary	Tibor Andrásfi; Máté Tamás Koch; Dávid Nagy; Gergely Siklósi
6.	Ukraine	Nikita Koshman; Ievgen Makiienko; Volodymyr Stankevych; Roman Svichkar
7.	Switzerland	Alexis Bayard; Hadrien Favre; Ian Hauri; Lucas Malcotti
8.	Czech Republic	Michal Čupr; Jakub Jurka; Matyas Pavlik; Martin Rubeš

Round of 16
1	Hungary	45
16	United Kingdom	31
9	Netherlands	45
8	Poland	34
5	Israel	34
12	Germany	45
13	Individual Neutral Athletes	30
4	Czech Republic	45
3	Italy	45
14	Estonia	21
11	Denmark	34
6	Switzerland	45
7	Ukraine	35
10	Spain	34
15	Sweden	31
2	France	45

Quarter-finals
1	Hungary	38
9	Netherlands	45
12	Germany	45
4	Czech Republic	35
3	Italy	40
6	Switzerland	37
7	Ukraine	40
2	France	45

Semi-finals
9	Netherlands	45
12	Germany	28
3	Italy	33
2	France	45

Final
9	Netherlands	29
2	France	45
Bronze medal
12	Germany	28
3	Italy	40

==== Sabre team ====
Position	Team	Fencers
1st place, gold medalist(s)	Hungary	Nikolász Iliász; Krisztián Rabb; András Szatmári; Áron Szilágyi
2nd place, silver medalist(s)	Italy	Luca Curatoli; Michele Gallo; Matteo Neri; Pietro Torre
3rd place, bronze medalist(s)	Individual Neutral Athletes	Dmitriy Danilenko; Pavel Graudyn; Anatoliy Kostenko; Kirill Tiuliukov
4.	France	Rémi Garrigue; Jean-Philippe Patrice; Sébastien Patrice; Maxime Pianfetti
5.	Germany	Frederic Kindler; Philipp Methner; Leon Schlaffer; Matyas Szabo
6.	Turkey	Tolga Aslan; Muhammed Furkan Kalender; Furkan Yaman; Enver Yıldırım
7.	Georgia	Mikhail Alpaidze; Beka Bazadze; Sandro Bazadze; Giorgi Urushadze
8.	Poland	Benedykt Denkiewicz; Szymon Hryciuk; Krzysztof Kaczkowski; Olaf Stasiak

Round of 16
1	Hungary	Bye
−	−	−
9	Ukraine	42
8	Georgia	45
5	Turkey	45
12	United Kingdom	42
13	Individual Neutral Athletes	45
4	Romania	39
3	Italy	Bye
−	−	−
11	Bulgaria	28
6	Germany	45
7	Poland	45
10	Spain	41
−	−	−
2	France	Bye

Quarter-finals
1	Hungary	45
8	Georgia	41
5	Turkey	32
13	Individual Neutral Athletes	45
3	Italy	45
6	Germany	38
7	Poland	28
2	France	45

Semi-finals
1	Hungary	45
13	Individual Neutral Athletes	26
3	Italy	45
2	France	42

Final
1	Hungary	45
3	Italy	35
Bronze medal
13	Individual Neutral Athletes	45
2	France	42

=== Women ===
==== Foil individual ====
Position	Name	Country
1st place, gold medalist(s)	Éva Lacheray	France
2nd place, silver medalist(s)	Carolina Stutchbury	United Kingdom
3rd place, bronze medalist(s)	Flóra Pásztor	Hungary
3rd place, bronze medalist(s)	Martina Batini	Italy
5.	Morgane Patru	France
6.	Dariia Myroniuk	Ukraine
7.	Rebeca Cândescu	Romania
8.	Maria-Eleni Chaldaiou	Greece

Round of 16
1	(France) Éva Lacheray	15
17	(Romania) Mălina Călugăreanu	8
9	(France) Morgane Patru	15
8	(Italy) Alice Volpi	11
5	(Hungary) Flóra Pásztor	15
12	(France) Pauline Ranvier	6
13	(Ukraine) Dariia Myroniuk	15
4	(France) Anita Blaze	14
3	(Ukraine) Alina Poloziuk	13
14	(Italy) Martina Batini	15
22	(Romania) Rebeca Cândescu	12
6	(Authorised Neutral Athletes) Marta Martyanova	11
7	(Italy) Arianna Errigo	11
23	(Greece) Maria-Eleni Chaldaiou	15
15	(United Kingdom) Carolina Stutchbury	15
2	(Italy) Anna Cristino	13

Quarter-finals
1	(France) Éva Lacheray	11
9	(France) Morgane Patru	8
5	(Hungary) Flóra Pásztor	15
13	(Ukraine) Dariia Myroniuk	8
14	(Italy) Martina Batini	15
22	(Romania) Rebeca Cândescu	7
23	(Greece) Maria-Eleni Chaldaiou	9
15	(United Kingdom) Carolina Stutchbury	15

Semi-finals
1	(France) Éva Lacheray	15
5	(Hungary) Flóra Pásztor	7
14	(Italy) Martina Batini	12
15	(United Kingdom) Carolina Stutchbury	15

Final
1	(France) Éva Lacheray	15
15	(United Kingdom) Carolina Stutchbury	13

==== Épée individual ====
Position	Name	Country
1st place, gold medalist(s)	Aizanat Murtazaeva	Individual Neutral Athletes
2nd place, silver medalist(s)	Katrina Lehis	Estonia
3rd place, bronze medalist(s)	Alberta Santuccio	Italy
3rd place, bronze medalist(s)	Sara Maria Kowalczyk	Italy
5.	Giulia Rizzi	Italy
6.	Alexandra Louis-Marie	France
7.	Gloria Klughardt	Poland
8.	Alexandra Ehler	Germany

Round of 16
1	(Sweden) Emma Fransson	10
48	(Germany) Alexandra Ehler	11
9	(Italy) Sara Maria Kowalczyk	15
40	(Latvia) Sofija Prosina	11
5	(Switzerland) Pauline Brunner	10
21	(Authorised Neutral Athletes) Aizanat Murtazaeva	15
20	(France) Alexandra Louis-Marie	12
4	(France) Lauren Rembi	4
3	(Italy) Giulia Rizzi	15
46	(Estonia) Nelli Differt	12
22	(Hungary) Eszter Muhari	10
6	(Italy) Alberta Santuccio	11
39	(Poland) Gloria Klughardt	15
55	(France) Marie-Florence Candassamy	14
18	(Estonia) Katrina Lehis	14
31	(Authorised Neutral Athletes) Kristina Yasinskaya	11

Quarter-finals
48	(Germany) Alexandra Ehler	13
9	(Italy) Sara Maria Kowalczyk	15
21	(Authorised Neutral Athletes) Aizanat Murtazaeva	15
20	(France) Alexandra Louis-Marie	10
3	(Italy) Giulia Rizzi	9
6	(Italy) Alberta Santuccio	10
39	(Poland) Gloria Klughardt	5
18	(Estonia) Katrina Lehis	15

Semi-finals
9	(Italy) Sara Maria Kowalczyk	13
21	(Authorised Neutral Athletes) Aizanat Murtazaeva	14
6	(Italy) Alberta Santuccio	8
18	(Estonia) Katrina Lehis	9

Final
21	(Authorised Neutral Athletes) Aizanat Murtazaeva	9
18	(Estonia) Katrina Lehis	8

==== Sabre individual ====
Position	Name	Country
1st place, gold medalist(s)	Sarah Noutcha	France
2nd place, silver medalist(s)	Alina Komashchuk	Ukraine
3rd place, bronze medalist(s)	Sugár Katinka Battai	Hungary
3rd place, bronze medalist(s)	Sylwia Matuszak	Poland
5.	Renáta Katona	Hungary
6.	Lucia Martin-Portugues	Spain
7.	Yoana Ilieva	Bulgaria
8.	Mariella Viale	Italy

Round of 16
1	(France) Sara Balzer	11
17	(Bulgaria) Yoana Ilieva	15
41	(Romania) Andreea Lupu	7
8	(France) Sarah Noutcha	15
5	(Hungary) Sugár Katinka Battai	15
21	(Greece) Despina Georgiadou	10
13	(Spain) Lucia Martin-Portugues	15
29	(Poland) Angelika Wator	14
3	(Ukraine) Alina Komashchuk	15
14	(Greece) Theodora Gkountoura	10
22	(Italy) Mariella Viale	15
27	(Turkey) Nisanur Erbil	8
26	(Poland) Sylwia Matuszak	15
10	(Italy) Chiara Mormile	13
15	(Italy) Michela Battiston	13
2	(Hungary) Renáta Katona	15

Quarter-finals
17	(Bulgaria) Yoana Ilieva	10
8	(France) Sarah Noutcha	15
5	(Hungary) Sugár Katinka Battai	15
13	(Spain) Lucia Martin-Portugues	7
3	(Ukraine) Alina Komashchuk	15
22	(Italy) Mariella Viale	10
26	(Poland) Sylwia Matuszak	15
2	(Hungary) Renáta Katona	14

Semi-finals
8	(France) Sarah Noutcha	15
5	(Hungary) Sugár Katinka Battai	9
3	(Ukraine) Alina Komashchuk	15
26	(Poland) Sylwia Matuszak	6

Final
8	(France) Sarah Noutcha	15
3	(Ukraine) Alina Komashchuk	6

==== Foil team ====
Position	Team	Fencers
1st place, gold medalist(s)	Italy	Martina Batini; Anna Cristino; Arianna Errigo; Alice Volpi
2nd place, silver medalist(s)	France	Anita Blaze; Eva Lacheray; Pauline Ranvier; Morgane Patru
3rd place, bronze medalist(s)	Spain	Andrea Breteau; María Díaz; María Mariño; Ariadna Tucker
4.	Poland	Martyna Jelińska; Hanna Łyczbińska; Martyna Synoradzka; Karolina Żurawska
5.	Hungary	Kata Kondricz; Dóra Lupkovics; Erika Nekifor; Flóra Pásztor
6.	Ukraine	Kateryna Budenko; Dariia Myroniuk; Alina Poloziuk; Olga Sopit
7.	Germany	Luca Holland-Cunz; Anne Kirsch; Anne Kleibrink; Carlotta Morandi
8.	United Kingdom	Katie Castillo-Bernaus; Carolina Stutchbury; Amelie Tsang; Zoe Wagstaff

Round of 16
1	Italy	Bye
–	–	–
9	Romania	22
8	Germany	42
5	Spain	45
12	Individual Neutral Athletes	30
13	Greece	29
4	Hungary	44
3	Poland	Bye
−	–	−
11	Israel	31
6	Ukraine	34
7	Austria	29
10	United Kingdom	45
2	France	Bye
−	–	−

Quarter-finals
1	Italy	45
8	Germany	42
5	Spain	45
4	Hungary	33
3	Poland	33
6	Ukraine	32
10	United Kingdom	30
2	France	43

Semi-finals
1	Italy	45
5	Spain	29
3	Poland	41
2	France	45

Final
1	Italy	38
2	France	37
Bronze medal
5	Spain	45
3	Poland	30
