= 2018 World Cadets and Juniors Fencing Championships =

2018 Junior World Fencing Championships
- Dates: 1–9 April 2018
- Host city: Verona, Italy
- Events: 18

The 2018 Junior World Fencing Championships took place in Verona, Italy from 1 to 9 April.

== Medal summary ==
=== Junior events ===
==== Men's events ====
Event	Gold	Silver	Bronze
Épée	Luidgi Midelton (FRA)	Davide Di Veroli (ITA)	Máté Koch (HUN); Lilian Nguefack (FRA)
Foil	Nick Itkin (USA)	Tommaso Marini (ITA)	Sidarth Kumbla (USA); Grigoriy Semenyuk (RUS)
Sabre	Konstantin Lokhanov (RUS)	Sébastien Patrice (FRA)	Raoul Bonah (GER); Matteo Neri (ITA)
Team Épée	Hungary; Dávid Nagy; Tibor Andrásfi; Máté Koch; Gergely Debnár	France; Arthur Philippe; Simon Contrepois; Lilian Nguefack; Luidgi Midelton	Italy; Giacomo Paolini; Gianpaolo Buzzacchino; Davide Di Veroli; Valerio Cuomo
Team Foil	Russia; Grigoriy Semenyuk; Kirill Borodachev; Vladislav Mylnikov; Anton Borodachev	France; Rafael Savin; Alexandre Ediri; Wallerand Roger; Pierre Loisel	United States; Geoffrey Tourette; Kenji Bravo; Sidarth Kumbla; Nick Itkin
Team Sabre	Italy; Matteo Neri; Alberto Arpino; Raffaele Minischetti; Giacomo Mignuzzi	Russia; Mark Stepanov; Anatoliy Kostenko; Vladislav Pozdnyakov; Konstantin Lokhanov	United States; Kamar Skeete; Erwin Cai; Mitchell Saron; Andrew Doddo

==== Women's events ====
Event	Gold	Silver	Bronze
Épée	Anastasia Soldatova (RUS)	Julia Falińska (POL)	Kinga Nagy (HUN); Emma Borsody (HUN)
Foil	Yuka Ueno (JPN)	Martina Favaretto (ITA)	Lauren Scruggs (USA); Eva Lacheray (FRA)
Sabre	Olga Nikitina (RUS)	Natalia Botello (MEX)	Liza Pusztai (HUN); Lucia Lucarini (ITA)
Team Épée	Italy; Eleonora De Marchi; Beatrice Cagnin; Federica Isola; Alessandra Bozza	Romania; Alexandra Predescu; Bianca Benea; Zsuzsa Schlier; Denisa Barosan	Russia; Ekaterina Tarasova; Anastasia Soldatova; Kristina Yasinskaya; Marina Kesaeva
Team Foil	United States; May Tieu; Sylvie Binder; Lauren Scruggs; Delphine DeVore	Singapore; Tatiana Yu Rong Wong; Amita Berthier; Nicole Mae Hui Shan Wong; Maxine Jie Xin Wong	Germany; Sophia Werner; Aliya Dhuique-Hein; Zsofia Posgay; Leonie Ebert
Team Sabre	Russia; Alina Mikhailova; Evgenia Podpaskova; Valeria Kobzeva; Olga Nikitina	United States; Edith Johnson; Elizabeth Tartakovsky; Chloe Fox-Gitomer; Zara Moss	Italy; Beatrice Dalla Vecchia; Claudia Rotili; Giulia Arpino; Lucia Lucarini

=== Cadet events ===
==== Men's events ====
Event	Gold	Silver	Bronze
Épée	Davide Di Veroli (ITA)	Filippo Armaleo (ITA)	Simone Greco (ITA); Seiya Asami (JPN)
Foil	Kenji Bravo (USA)	Marcello Olivares (USA)	Maciej Bem (POL); Diego Cervantes (MEX)
Sabre	Andrei Pastin (ROU)	Robert Vidovszky (USA)	Krisztián Rabb (HUN); Alonso Santamaria (ESP)

==== Women's events ====
Event	Gold	Silver	Bronze
Épée	Kaylin Hsieh (HKG)	Emily Vermeule (USA)	Lim Tae-hee (KOR); Tamila Muridova (KAZ)
Foil	Yuka Ueno (JPN)	May Tieu (USA)	Delphine DeVore (USA); Martina Favaretto (ITA)
Sabre	Liza Pusztai (HUN)	Natalia Botello (MEX)	Alina Klyuchnikova (RUS); Alexis Anglade (USA)

== Medal table ==
Rank	Nation	Gold	Silver	Bronze	Total
1	Russia	5	1	3	9
2	United States	3	5	6	14
3	Italy	3	4	6	13
4	Hungary	2	0	5	7
5	Japan	2	0	1	3
6	France	1	3	2	6
7	Romania	1	1	0	2
8	Hong Kong	1	0	0	1
9	Mexico	0	2	1	3
10	Poland	0	1	1	2
11	Singapore	0	1	0	1
12	Germany	0	0	2	2
13	Kazakhstan	0	0	1	1
13	South Korea	0	0	1	1
13	Spain	0	0	1	1
Totals (15 entries)		18	18	30	66
