= Fencing at the 2023 European Games – Women's team foil =

Women's team foil at the 2023 European Games
- Venue: Tauron Arena Kraków
- Location: Kraków, Poland
- Date: 28 June
- Competitors: 52 from 13 nations
- Teams: 13

Medalists
gold medal	Martina Batini; Martina Favaretto; Francesca Palumbo; Alice Volpi	Italy
silver medal	Anita Blaze; Morgane Patru; Pauline Ranvier; Ysaora Thibus	France
bronze medal	Leandra Behr; Aliya Dhuique-Hein; Leonie Ebert; Anne Sauer	Germany

The women's team foil competition at the 2023 European Games in Kraków was held on 28 June 2023.

== Results ==
=== Main bracket ===
Round of 16
Romania	34
Ukraine	35
Hungary	45
Moldova	23
Greece	33
Spain	45
Israel	33
Germany	45
Austria	45
Great Britain	37

Quarterfinals
Italy	45
Ukraine	26
Hungary	45
Spain	28
Poland	33
Germany	41
Austria	42
France	45

Semifinals
Italy	45
Hungary	35
Germany	31
France	45

Final
Italy	45
France	40
Third place
Hungary	38
Germany	45

=== 5–8th place bracket ===
5–8th place semifinals
Ukraine	45
Spain	33
Poland	45
Austria	32

Fifth place
Ukraine	35
Poland	45
Seventh place
Spain	45
Austria	33

=== 9–13th place bracket ===
9–13th place quarterfinal
Moldova	26
Greece	45

9–12th place semifinals
Romania	32
Greece	45
Israel	30
Great Britain	36

Ninth place
Greece	29
Great Britain	45
Eleventh place
Romania	42
Israel	44

== Final ranking ==
Rank	Team	Rank	Team	Rank	Team
1st place, gold medalist(s)	Italy; Martina Batini; Martina Favaretto; Francesca Palumbo; Alice Volpi	6	Ukraine; Dariia Myroniuk; Kristina Petrova; Alina Poloziuk; Olga Sopit	11	Israel; Lior Druck; May Kagan Tyagunov; Lihy Koren; Gili Kuritzky
2nd place, silver medalist(s)	France; Anita Blaze; Morgane Patru; Pauline Ranvier; Ysaora Thibus	7	Spain; Andrea Breteau; Ariadna Castro; María Mariño; Ariadna Tucker	12	Romania; Mălina Călugăreanu; Emilia Corbu; Andreea Dincă; Anca Săveanu
3rd place, bronze medalist(s)	Germany; Leandra Behr; Aliya Dhuique-Hein; Leonie Ebert; Anne Sauer	8	Austria; Lilli Brugger; Freya Cenker; Maria Kränkl; Olivia Wohlgemuth	13	Moldova; Maria Cojocari; Uliana Dobrinina; Ecaterina Gorobet; Uliana Josan
4	Hungary; Kata Kondricz; Fanni Kreiss; Dóra Lupkovics; Flóra Pásztor	9	Great Britain; Kate Beardmore; Yasmin Campbell; Carolina Stutchbury; Amelie Tsang		
5	Poland; Aleksandra Jeglińska; Hanna Łyczbińska; Martyna Synoradzka; Julia Walczyk-Klimaszyk	10	Greece; Maria Chaldaiou; Stavroula Garyfallou; Aikaterini Kontochristopoulou; Vasiliki Mekra		
