= Men's team sabre at the 2026 World Fencing Championships =

- Venue: AsiaWorld–Expo
- Location: Hong Kong
- Dates: 30 July
- Competitors: 136 from 35 nations
- Teams: 35

Medalists
gold medal	Rémi Garrigue; Jean-Philippe Patrice; Sébastien Patrice; Maxime Pianfetti	France
silver medal	Oh Sang-uk; Do Gyeong-dong; Park Sang-won; Hwang Hee-geun	South Korea
bronze medal	Vlad Covaliu; George Dragomir; Răzvan Ursachi; Radu Nițu	Romania

The Men's team sabre competition at the 2026 World Fencing Championships was held on 30 July 2026.

== Draw ==
=== Finals ===
Semifinals
South Korea	45
Romania	44
Hungary	40
France	45

Final
South Korea	31
France	45
Third place
Romania	45
Hungary	39

=== Top half ===
==== Section 1 ====
Round of 64
New Zealand	32
Philippines	45

Round of 32
South Korea	45
Philippines	20
Kazakhstan	37
Spain	45
Egypt	45
Chile	15
Algeria	30
Russia	45

Round of 16
South Korea	45
Spain	39
Egypt	40
Russia	45

Quarterfinals
South Korea	45
Russia	37

==== Section 2 ====
Round of 32
Italy	45
Australia	26
India	33
Germany	45
Canada	41
Venezuela	45
Great Britain	17
Romania	45

Round of 16
Italy	45
Germany	36
Venezuela	30
Romania	45

Quarterfinals
Italy	36
Romania	45

=== Bottom half ===
==== Section 3 ====
Round of 64
Kuwait	39
Azerbaijan	45

Round of 32
Hungary	45
Azerbaijan	27
Georgia	44
Uzbekistan	45
Poland	45
Mexico	24
Brazil	30
United States	45

Round of 16
Hungary	45
Uzbekistan	29
Poland	44
United States	45

Quarterfinals
Hungary	45
United States	36

==== Section 4 ====
Round of 64
Singapore	45
Thailand	43

Round of 32
Japan	45
Iran	35
Saudi Arabia	17
China	45
Turkey	45
Hong Kong	37
Singapore	31
France	45

Round of 16
Japan	41
China	45
Turkey	28
France	45

Quarterfinals
China	36
France	45

=== Placement rounds ===
==== 5–8th place bracket ====
5–8th place semifinals
Russia	45
Italy	40
United States	45
China	24

Fifth place
Russia	37
United States	45
Seventh place
Italy
China	w/o

==== 9–16th place bracket ====
9–16th place quarterfinals
Spain	41
Egypt	45
Germany	45
Venezuela	31
Uzbekistan	45
Poland	44
Japan	45
Turkey	38

9–12th place semifinals
Egypt	45
Germany	44
Uzbekistan	35
Japan	45

Ninth place
Egypt	45
Japan	35
Eleventh place
Germany	45
Uzbekistan	35

==== 13–16th place bracket ====
13–16th place semifinals
Spain	45
Venezuela	37
Poland	27
Turkey	45

13th place
Spain	45
Turkey	42
15th place
Venezuela	42
Poland	45

== Final ranking ==
Rank	Team
1st place, gold medalist(s)	France
2nd place, silver medalist(s)	South Korea
3rd place, bronze medalist(s)	Romania
4	Hungary
5	United States
6	Russia
7	China
8	Italy
9	Egypt
10	Japan
11	Germany
12	Uzbekistan
13	Spain
14	Turkey
15	Poland
16	Venezuela
17	Canada
18	Kazakhstan
19	Hong Kong
20	Georgia
21	India
22	Mexico
23	Saudi Arabia
24	Chile
25	Algeria
26	Iran
27	Brazil
28	Australia
29	Great Britain
30	Azerbaijan
31	Singapore
32	Philippines
33	New Zealand
34	Thailand
35	Kuwait
