= 2026 European Fencing Championships =

Fencing competition in Antony, France

- Host city: (France) Antony
- Dates: 15–21 June
- Website: Official website

The 2026 European Fencing Championships were held from 15 to 21 June 2025 in Antony, France.

== Change of host ==
In January 2026, Estonia lost the hosting rights for the 2026 European Fencing Championships after refusing to guarantee entry visas for Russian and Belarusian athletes competing under the International Fencing Federation's neutral-athlete regulations. The championships had originally been awarded to Tallinn, but the FIE reassigned the event to Antony, France, after Estonian authorities maintained that athletes from Russia and Belarus would not be granted visas. The decision followed the FIE's relaxation of eligibility requirements for neutral athletes from Russia and Belarus in late 2025.

== Medal summary ==
=== Men's events ===
| Event | Gold | Silver | Bronze |
|---|---|---|---|
| Foil | Rafael Savin; France | Andrzej Rządkowski; Poland | Tommaso Martini; Italy |
| Foil | Rafael Savin; France | Andrzej Rządkowski; Poland | Anton Borodachev; Individual Neutral Athletes |
| Épée | Simone Mencarelli; Italy | Alon Sarid; Israel | Conrad Kongstad; Denmark |
| Épée | Simone Mencarelli; Italy | Alon Sarid; Israel | Neisser Loyola; Belgium |
| Sabre | Jean-Philippe Patrice; France | Maxime Pianfetti; France | András Szatmári; Hungary |
| Sabre | Jean-Philippe Patrice; France | Maxime Pianfetti; France | George Dragomir; Romania |
| Team foil | Italy; Guillaume Bianchi; Giulio Lombardi; Filippo Macchi; Tommaso Marini | France; Anas Anane; Maxime Pauty; Rafael Savin; Alexandre Sido | Germany; Niklas Distelkamp; Alexander Kahl; Bastian Kappus; Luis Klein |
| Team épée | Italy; Davide Di Veroli; Matteo Galassi; Simone Mencarelli; Andrea Santarelli | France; Alexandre Bardenet; Paul Fortin; Aymerick Gally; Kendrick Jean-Joseph | Ukraine; Nikita Koshman; Mykhailo Krasniuk; Ievgen Makiienko; Roman Svichkar |
| Team sabre | Hungary; Benedek Dallos; Krisztián Rabb; András Szatmári; Áron Szilágyi | Romania; Vlad Covaliu; George Dragomir; Radu Nițu; Răzvan Ursachi | France; Rémi Garrigue; Jean-Philippe Patrice; Sébastien Patrice; Maxime Pianfetti |

=== Women's events ===
| Event | Gold | Silver | Bronze |
|---|---|---|---|
| Foil | Olga Sopit; Ukraine | Arianna Errigo; Italy | María Mariño; Spain |
| Foil | Olga Sopit; Ukraine | Arianna Errigo; Italy | Vladislava Peniushkina; Individual Neutral Athletes |
| Épée | Katrina Lehis; Estonia | Alexandra Ehler; Germany | Eszter Muhari; Hungary |
| Épée | Katrina Lehis; Estonia | Alexandra Ehler; Germany | Alicja Klasik; Poland |
| Sabre | Lucía Martín-Portugués; Spain | Yana Egorian; Individual Neutral Athletes | Toscane Tori; France |
| Sabre | Lucía Martín-Portugués; Spain | Yana Egorian; Individual Neutral Athletes | Alina Komashchuk; Ukraine |
| Team foil | Italy; Martina Batini; Anna Cristino; Arianna Errigo; Martina Favaretto | France; Anita Blaze; Éva Lacheray; Pauline Ranvier; Ysaora Thibus | Ukraine; Dariia Myroniuk; Kristina Petrova; Alina Poloziuk; Olga Sopit |
| Team épée | France; Marie-Florence Candassamy; Alexandra Louis-Marie; Auriane Mallo-Breton; Diane Von Kerssenbrock | Hungary; Emma Borsody; Lili Büki; Eszter Muhari; Blanka Nagy | Ukraine; Inna Brovko; Olena Kryvytska; Anna Maksymenko; Yana Shemyakina |
| Team sabre | Individual Neutral Athletes; Yana Egorian; Aleksandra Mikhailova; Alina Mikhailova; Anastasiya Shorokhova | France; Manon Apithy-Brunet; Sara Balzer; Sarah Noutcha; Toscane Tori | Italy; Michela Battiston; Claudia Rotili; Manuela Spica; Mariella Viale |

=== Medal table ===
* Host nation (France)

| Rank | Nation | Gold | Silver | Bronze | Total |
|---|---|---|---|---|---|
| 1 | Italy | 4 | 1 | 2 | 7 |
| 2 | France* | 3 | 5 | 2 | 10 |
| 3 | Hungary | 1 | 1 | 2 | 4 |
| 3 | Individual Neutral Athletes | 1 | 1 | 2 | 4 |
| 5 | Ukraine | 1 | 0 | 4 | 5 |
| 6 | Spain | 1 | 0 | 1 | 2 |
| 7 | Estonia | 1 | 0 | 0 | 1 |
| 8 | Germany | 0 | 1 | 1 | 2 |
| 8 | Poland | 0 | 1 | 1 | 2 |
| 8 | Romania | 0 | 1 | 1 | 2 |
| 11 | Israel | 0 | 1 | 0 | 1 |
| 12 | Belgium | 0 | 0 | 1 | 1 |
| 12 | Denmark | 0 | 0 | 1 | 1 |
| Totals (13 entries) | | 12 | 12 | 18 | 42 |
