= Mykhailo Krasniuk =

Ukrainian fencer (born 2001)

Personal information
- Native name: Миха́йло Андрі́йович Красню́к
- Full name: Mykhailo Andriyovych Krasniuk
- Born: 19 September 2001 (age 25)

Fencing career
- Sport: Fencing
- Country: Ukraine
- Weapon: Épée
- Hand: Right-handed
Medal record
Men's épée
Representing Ukraine
World Championships
Silver medal – second place	2026 Hong Kong	Team
European Championships
Bronze medal – third place	2026 Antony	Team

Mykhailo Andriyovych Krasniuk (Ukrainian: Миха́йло Андрі́йович Красню́к); born 19 September 2001) is a Ukrainian right-handed épée fencer.

== Career ==
In June 2026, Krasniuk competed at the 2026 European Fencing Championships and won a bronze medal in the team épée event. The next month he competed at the 2026 World Fencing Championships in the team épée and helped Ukraine advance to the finals in the event for the first time since 2019. During the final Ukraine lost to Kazakhstan and won a silver medal.
