= Toscane Tori =

French fencer (born 2004)

Personal information
- Born: 3 March 2004 (age 22)

Fencing career
- Sport: Fencing
- Country: France
- Weapon: Sabre
- Hand: Left-handed
Medal record
Women's sabre
Representing France
World Championships
Gold medal – first place	2025 Tbilisi	Team
Bronze medal – third place	2026 Hong Kong	Individual
Bronze medal – third place	2026 Hong Kong	Team
European Championships
Gold medal – first place	2025 Genoa	Team
Silver medal – second place	2026 Antony	Team
Bronze medal – third place	2026 Antony	Individual

Toscane Tori (born 3 March 2004) is a French left-handed sabre fencer. She won a gold medal in the team sabre at the 2025 World Fencing Championships.

== Career ==
In June 2025, Tori competed at the 2025 European Fencing Championships and won a gold medal in the team event. The next month she competed at the 2025 World Fencing Championships and won a gold medal in the team sabre event.

In June 2026, she competed at the 2026 European Fencing Championships and won a silver medal in the team event and a bronze medal in the individual event. The next month she competed at the 2026 World Fencing Championships and won a bronze medal in the individual sabre event. During the semifinals she lost to compatriot Sara Balzer. She also competed in the team sabre event and won a bronze medal.
