= Fencing at the 2024 Summer Olympics – Men's team sabre =

Men's team sabre at the Games of the XXXIII Olympiad
- Olympic fencing
- Venue: Grand Palais strip
- Date: 31 July 2024
- Competitors: 32 from 8 nations
- Teams: 8

Medalists
1st place, gold medalist(s)		Oh Sang-uk; Gu Bon-gil; Park Sang-won; Do Gyeong-dong	South Korea
2nd place, silver medalist(s)		Áron Szilágyi; Csanád Gémesi; András Szatmári; Krisztián Rabb	Hungary
3rd place, bronze medalist(s)		Sébastien Patrice; Maxime Pianfetti; Boladé Apithy; Jean-Philippe Patrice	France

The men's team sabre event at the 2024 Summer Olympics took place on 31 July 2024 at the Grand Palais strip. 24 fencers (eight teams of three) from eight nations competed.

== Background ==
Officially the 26th appearance of the event, it has been held at every Summer Olympics since 1908 except 2016 (during the time when team events were rotated off the schedule, with only two of the three weapons for each of the men's and women's categories).

The South Korean team won the gold medal and achieved its third consecutive victory since the 2012 competition. The Hungarian team won the silver medal and the French team won the bronze medal.

== Qualification ==
A National Olympic Committee (NOC) could enter a team of three fencers in the men's team sabre. These fencers also automatically qualified for the individual event.

== Competition format ==
The tournament was a single-elimination tournament, with classification matches for all places. Each match featured the three fencers on each team competing in a round-robin, with nine three-minute bouts to five points; the winning team was the one that reaches 45 total points first or was leading after the end of the nine bouts.

== Schedule ==
The competition was held over a single day.

All times are Central European Summer Time (UTC+2)

Date	Time	Round
Wednesday, 31 July 2024	14:20; 16:40; 17:30; 17:30; 19:30; 20:30	Quarterfinals; Semifinals; Classification 7/8; Classification 5/6; Bronze medal match Gold medal match

== Results ==
Quarter-finals
South Korea	45
Canada	33
Egypt	41
France	45
Hungary	45
Italy	38
Iran	45
United States	44

Semi-finals
South Korea	45
France	39
Hungary	45
Iran	43

Final
South Korea	45
Hungary	41
Bronze medal bout
France	45
Iran	25

5–8th place classification

5–8th place semifinals
Canada	41
Egypt	45
Italy	45
United States	40

Fifth place bout
Egypt	38
Italy	45
Seventh place bout
Canada	43
United States	45

== Final classification ==
Rank	Team	Athletes
1st place, gold medalist(s)	South Korea	Oh Sang-uk; Gu Bon-gil; Park Sang-won; Do Gyeong-dong
2nd place, silver medalist(s)	Hungary	Áron Szilágyi; Csanád Gémesi; András Szatmári; Krisztián Rabb
3rd place, bronze medalist(s)	France	Sébastien Patrice; Maxime Pianfetti; Boladé Apithy; Jean-Philippe Patrice
4	Iran	Ali Pakdaman; Mohammad Rahbari; Farzad Baher; Mohammad Fotouhi
5	Italy	Luca Curatoli; Luigi Samele; Michele Gallo; Pietro Torre
6	Egypt	Ziad El-Sissy; Mohamed Amer; Adham Moataz; Khodie Yassin
7	United States	Eli Dershwitz; Mitchell Saron; Colin Heathcock; Filip Dolegiewicz
8	Canada	Fares Arfa; Shaul Gordon; François Cauchon; Olivier Desrosiers
