= Anton Borodachev =

Russian Olympic foil fencer

Personal information
- Nationality: (Russia) Russian
- Born: 23 March 2000 (age 26) Samara, Russia

Fencing career
- Sport: Fencing
- Country: Russia
- Weapon: Foil
- Club: Samara Regional Sports School of Olympic Reserve No.5 [RUS]; Central Sports Army Club [RUS]
- FIE ranking: current ranking
Medal record
Men's foil
Representing Individual Neutral Athletes
European Championships
Bronze medal – third place	2025 Genoa	Team
Bronze medal – third place	2026 Antony	Individual
Representing (Russia) ROC
Olympic Games
Silver medal – second place	2020 Tokyo	Team
Representing Russia
Junior World Championships
Gold medal – first place	2018 Verona	Team
Gold medal – first place	2019 Toruń	Team

Anton Viktorovich Borodachev (Russian: Антон Викторович Бородачёв, IPA: [ɐnˈton bərədɐˈtɕɵf]), born 23 March 2000) is a Russian right-handed foil fencer and 2021 team Olympic silver medalist. He lives in Samara, Russia, and is a Russian Armed Forces athlete.

== Medal record ==
=== Olympic Games ===
Year	Location	Event	Position
2021	Tokyo, Japan	Team Men's Foil	2nd

=== World Cup ===
Date	Location	Event	Position
2022-02-25	Cairo, Egypt	Individual Men's Foil	1st
