= Aizanat Murtazaeva =

Russian fencer

Personal information
- Native name: Айзанат Махачевна Муртазаева
- Full name: Aizanat Makhachevna Murtazaeva
- Nationality: Russia
- Born: 23 September 2001 (age 25) Khunzakh, Khunzakhsky District, Dagestan, Russia

Sport
- Sport: Fencing
Medal record
Women's épée
Representing Individual Neutral Athletes
World Championships
Silver medal – second place	2025 Tbilisi	Team
European Championships
Gold medal – first place	2025 Genoa	Individual

Aizanat Makhachevna Murtazaeva (Russian: Айзанат Махачевна Муртазаева; born 23 September 2001) is a Russian right-handed épée fencer and 2021 Olympian.

Murtazaeva competed in the 2020 Tokyo Olympic Games, where she placed fourth in individual women's épée. She won two bronze medals at the 2019 and 2021 Russian Championships.

== Medal Record ==
=== World Cup ===
Date	Location	Event	Position
2022-02-11	Barcelona, Spain	Individual Women's Épée	3rd
