= András Szatmári =

Hungarian fencer (born 1993)

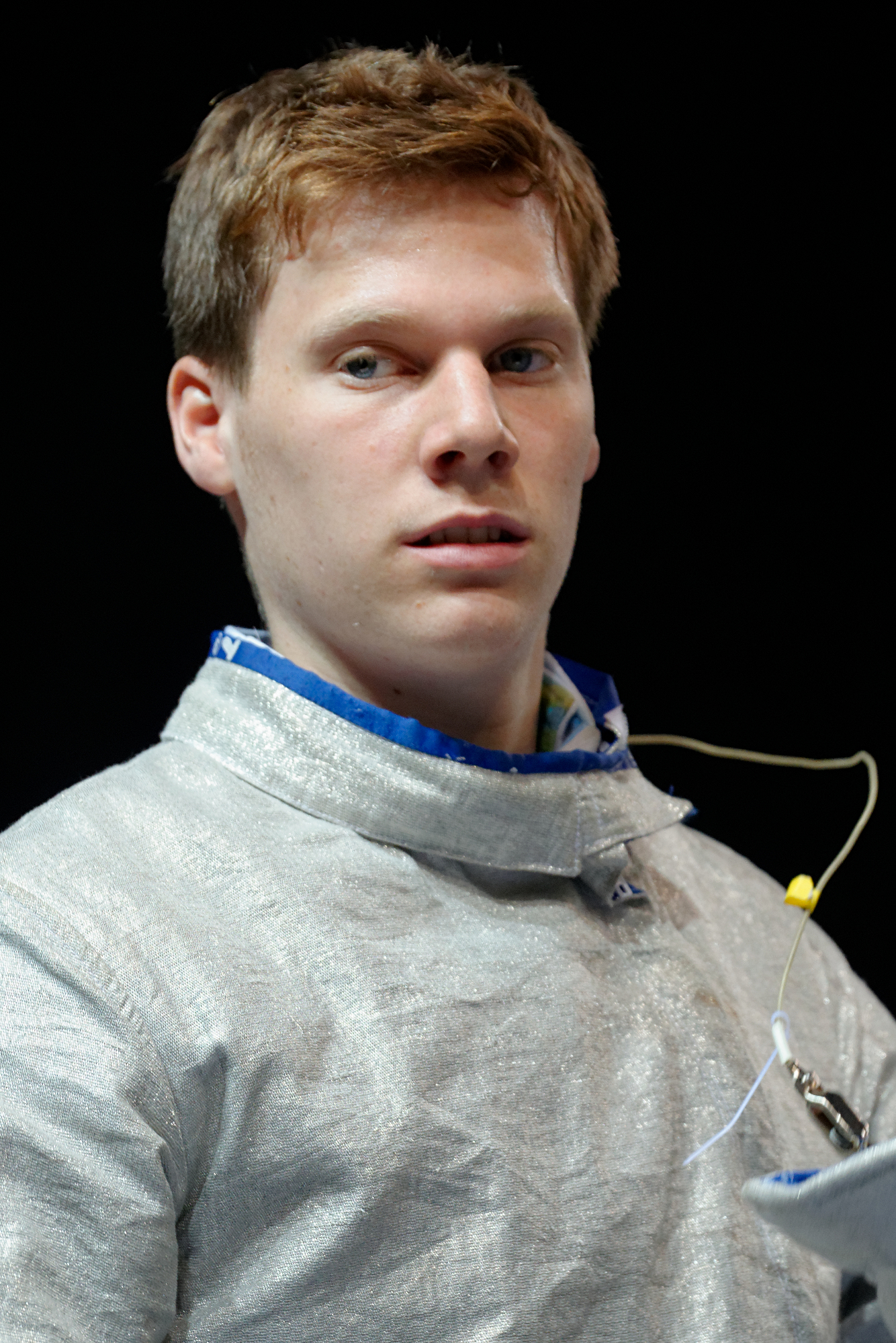
- Szatmári at the 2014 European Fencing Championships

Personal information
- Born: 3 February 1993 (age 33) Budapest, Hungary
- Height: 1.85 m (6 ft 1 in)
- Weight: 65 kg (143 lb)

Fencing career
- Sport: Fencing
- Country: Hungary
- Weapon: Sabre
- Hand: Right-handed
- National coach: András Decsi
- Club: MTK Budapest
- Head coach: Gárdos Gábor
- Former coach: Bence Szabó, Ferenc Riba
- FIE ranking: current ranking
Medal record
Men's sabre
Representing Hungary
Event	1st	2nd	3rd
Olympic Games	0	1	1
World Championships	2	4	2
European Championships	3	2	2
Total	5	7	5
Olympic Games
Silver medal – second place	2024 Paris	Team
Bronze medal – third place	2020 Tokyo	Team
World Championships
Gold medal – first place	2017 Leipzig	Individual
Gold medal – first place	2023 Milan	Team
Silver medal – second place	2016 Rio de Janeiro	Team
Silver medal – second place	2017 Leipzig	Team
Silver medal – second place	2019 Budapest	Individual
Silver medal – second place	2019 Budapest	Team
Silver medal – second place	2022 Cairo	Team
Bronze medal – third place	2014 Kazan	Team
Bronze medal – third place	2018 Wuxi	Team
European Championships
Gold medal – first place	2018 Novi Sad	Team
Gold medal – first place	2022 Antalya	Team
Gold medal – first place	2025 Genoa	Team
Gold medal – first place	2026 Antony	Team
Silver medal – second place	2019 Düsseldorf	Team
Silver medal – second place	2023 Plovdiv	Individual
Bronze medal – third place	2015 Montreaux	Team
Bronze medal – third place	2017 Tbilisi	Team
Bronze medal – third place	2026 Antony	Individual
Hungarian Fencing Championships
Gold medal – first place	2016 Budapest	Individual

András Szatmári (born 3 February 1993) is a Hungarian right-handed sabre fencer, 2018 team European champion, 2017 individual world champion, and 2021 team Olympic bronze medalist.

== Career ==
Szatmári took up fencing to follow the steps of his father, who fenced at Vasas SC. His first coach was György Gerevich, son of seven-time Olympic fencer Aladár Gerevich, who also trained Áron Szilágyi and Csanád Gémesi. Szatmári was Junior European Champion and U23 European Championship in 2012 and won the silver medal in the 2013 Junior World Championships in Poreč.

He reached the quarter-finals in the 2013 World Championships in home city Budapest, where he was defeated by Russia's Nikolay Kovalev, who eventually took the silver medal. He was part of the Hungarian team that reached the semi-finals at the 2014 World Championships in Kazan, lost to South Korea, but defeated Russia to earn the bronze medal.

== Medal record ==
=== Olympic Games ===
Year	Location	Event	Position
2021	Tokyo, Japan	Team Men's Sabre	3rd
2024	Paris, France	Team Men's Sabre	2nd

=== World Championship ===
Year	Location	Event	Position
2014	Kazan, Russia	Team Men's Sabre	3rd
2016	Rio de Janeiro, Brazil	Team Men's Sabre	2nd
2017	Leipzig, Germany	Individual Men's Sabre	1st
2017	Leipzig, Germany	Team Men's Sabre	2nd
2018	Wuxi, China	Team Men's Sabre	3rd
2019	Budapest, Hungary	Individual Men's Sabre	2nd
2019	Budapest, Hungary	Team Men's Sabre	2nd
2022	Cairo, Egypt	Team Men's Sabre	2nd

=== European Championship ===
Year	Location	Event	Position
2015	Montreux, Switzerland	Team Men's Sabre	3rd
2017	(Georgia (country)) Tbilisi, Georgia	Team Men's Sabre	3rd
2018	Novi Sad, Serbia	Team Men's Sabre	1st
2019	Düsseldorf, Germany	Team Men's Sabre	2nd
2022	Antalya, Turkey	Team Men's Sabre	1st
2023	Plovdiv, Bulgaria	Individual Men's Sabre	2nd

=== Grand Prix ===
Date	Location	Event	Position
15 December 2017	Cancún, Mexico	Individual Men's Sabre	3rd
15 January 2023	Tunis, Tunisia	Individual Men's Sabre	3rd

=== World Cup ===
Date	Location	Event	Position
12 February 2016	Győr, Hungary	Individual Men's Sabre	3rd
2 March 2017	Padua, Italy	Individual Men's Sabre	1st
19 May 2017	Madrid, Spain	Individual Men's Sabre	3rd
2 February 2018	Padua, Italy	Individual Men's Sabre	3rd
12 February 2023	Warsaw, Poland	Team Men's Sabre	2nd
3 April 2023	Padua, Italy	Team Men's Sabre	1st

== Awards ==
- Hungarian Fencer of the Year: 2017

Orders and special awards

- Hungarian Cross of Merit – Gold Cross (2021)
