= 2025 World Fencing Championships =

Fencing tournament in Tbilisi, Georgia

- Dates: 22–30 July
- Host city: Tbilisi, Georgia
- Venue: Olympic Palace

The 2025 World Fencing Championships were held from 22 to 30 July 2025 in Tbilisi, Georgia.

== Schedule ==
Twelve events were held.

Date	Round
22 July	Women's épée qualification
22 July	Men's foil qualification
23 July	Women's épée
23 July	Men's foil
24 July	Women's foil qualification
24 July	Men's sabre qualification
25 July	Women's team épée qualification
25 July	Men's team foil qualification
25 July	Women's foil
25 July	Men's sabre
26 July	Men's épée qualification
26 July	Women's sabre qualification
26 July	Women's team épée
26 July	Men's team foil
27 July	Women's team foil qualification
27 July	Men's team sabre qualification
27 July	Women's sabre
27 July	Men's épée
28 July	Women's team foil
28 July	Men's team sabre
29 July	Men's team épée qualification
29 July	Women's team sabre qualification
30 July	Men's team épée
30 July	Women's team sabre

== Medal summary ==
=== Medal table ===
* Host nation (Georgia)

Rank	Nation	Gold	Silver	Bronze	Total
1	France	2	3	1	6
2	United States	2	1	0	3
3	Italy	2	0	4	6
4	Japan	2	0	1	3
–	Individual Neutral Athletes	1	2	0	3
5	Ukraine	1	0	2	3
6	Georgia*	1	0	0	1
6	Hong Kong	1	0	0	1
8	Hungary	0	3	3	6
9	South Korea	0	1	2	3
10	Estonia	0	1	1	2
11	Poland	0	1	0	1
12	China	0	0	1	1
12	Egypt	0	0	1	1
12	Kazakhstan	0	0	1	1
12	Romania	0	0	1	1
Totals (15 entries)		12	12	18	42

=== Men ===
Event	Gold	Silver	Bronze
Individual épée	Koki Kano; Japan	Gergely Siklósi; Hungary	Masaru Yamada; Japan
Individual épée	Koki Kano; Japan	Gergely Siklósi; Hungary	Nikita Koshman; Ukraine
Team épée	Japan; Seiya Asami; Koki Kano; Akira Komata; Masaru Yamada	Hungary; Tibor Andrásfi; Zsombor Keszthelyi; Máté Tamás Koch; Gergely Siklósi	Kazakhstan; Ruslan Kurbanov; Elmir Alimzhanov; Kirill Prokhodov; Vadim Sharlaimov
Individual foil	Ryan Choi; Hong Kong	Kirill Borodachev; Individual Neutral Athletes	Gergő Szemes; Hungary
Individual foil	Ryan Choi; Hong Kong	Kirill Borodachev; Individual Neutral Athletes	Maxime Pauty; France
Team foil	Italy; Guillaume Bianchi; Alessio Foconi; Filippo Macchi; Tommaso Marini	United States; Nick Itkin; Bryce Louie; Alexander Massialas; Gerek Meinhardt	Hungary; Dániel Dósa; Andor Mihályi; Gergő Szemes; Gergely Tóth
Individual sabre	Sandro Bazadze; Georgia	Jean-Philippe Patrice; France	Ahmed Hesham; Egypt
Individual sabre	Sandro Bazadze; Georgia	Jean-Philippe Patrice; France	Luca Curatoli; Italy
Team sabre	Italy; Luca Curatoli; Michele Gallo; Matteo Neri; Pietro Torre	Hungary; Csanád Gémesi; Nikolász Iliász; Krisztián Rabb; Áron Szilágyi	Romania; Vlad Covaliu; George Dragomir; Radu Nițu; Răzvan Ursachi

=== Women ===
Event	Gold	Silver	Bronze
Individual épée	Vlada Kharkova; Ukraine	Katrina Lehis; Estonia	Irina Embrich; Estonia
Individual épée	Vlada Kharkova; Ukraine	Katrina Lehis; Estonia	Song Se-ra; South Korea
Team épée	France; Marie-Florence Candassamy; Alexandra Louis-Marie; Lauren Rembi; Éloïse Vanryssel	Individual Neutral Athletes; Milen Bavuge Khabimana; Iana Bekmurzova; Aizanat Murtazaeva; Kristina Yasinskaya	South Korea; Kim Hyang-eun; Lee Hye-in; Lim Tae-hee; Song Se-ra
Individual foil	Lee Kiefer; United States	Pauline Ranvier; France	Anna Cristino; Italy
Individual foil	Lee Kiefer; United States	Pauline Ranvier; France	Martina Favaretto; Italy
Team foil	United States; Emily Jing; Lee Kiefer; Jaelyn Liu; Lauren Scruggs	France; Anita Blaze; Éva Lacheray; Morgane Patru; Pauline Ranvier	Italy; Anna Cristino; Arianna Errigo; Martina Favaretto; Alice Volpi
Individual sabre	Yana Egorian; Individual Neutral Athletes	Zuzanna Cieślar; Poland	Pan Qimiao; China
Individual sabre	Yana Egorian; Individual Neutral Athletes	Zuzanna Cieślar; Poland	Alina Komashchuk; Ukraine
Team sabre	France; Sara Balzer; Faustine Clapier; Sarah Noutcha; Toscane Tori	South Korea; Choi Se-bin; Jeon Ha-young; Kim Jeong-mi; Seo Ji-yeon	Hungary; Sugár Katinka Battai; Renáta Katona; Liza Pusztai; Luca Szűcs

== Controversies ==
Some Russian fencers were allowed to compete as Individual Neutral Athletes despite being members of Russian military, which contradicts IOC's recommendation. According to Ukrainian media, among athletes who are members of the Russian Armed Forces were lieutenant Yana Egorian, eventual World champion, major and Putin's authorized representative during the 2024 elections Sofya Velikaya, and warrant officer Olga Nikitina. More than 440 fencers from 40 countries signed a petition to FIE to reinstate rigorous background checks on Russian and Belarusian athletes competing as neutrals.

Protest actions were held in front of the hotel Russian fencers were staying. The protesters called them "Russian pigs" and exploded fireworks.
