= Sarah Noutcha =

French fencer (born 1999)

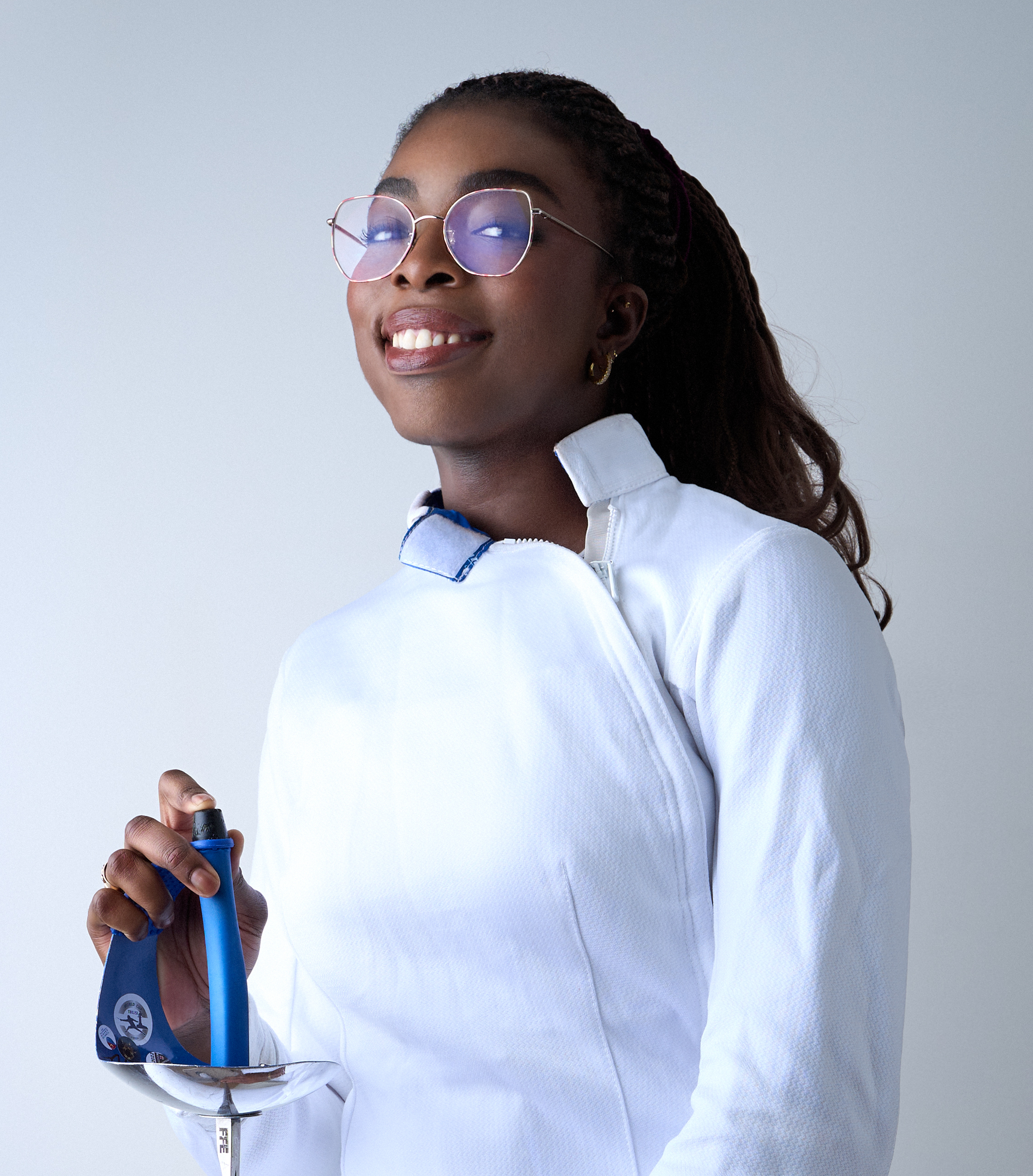
- Noutcha in 2023

Personal information
- Born: 16 December 1999 (age 26)
- Home town: Paris, France

Fencing career
- Sport: Fencing
- Country: France
- Weapon: Sabre
- Hand: Right-handed
- Club: Strasbourg Université Club
Medal record
Women's sabre
Representing France
World Championships
Gold medal – first place	2025 Tbilisi	Team
Silver medal – second place	2022 Cairo	Team
Bronze medal – third place	2026 Hong Kong	Team
European Championships
Gold medal – first place	2022 Antalya	Team
Gold medal – first place	2024 Basel	Team
Gold medal – first place	2025 Genoa	Team
Gold medal – first place	2025 Genoa	Individual
Silver medal – second place	2026 Antony	Team
Universiade
Gold medal – first place	2021 Chengdu	Team
Silver medal – second place	2019 Naples	Team
Bronze medal – third place	2021 Chengdu	Individual

Sarah Noutcha (born 16 December 1999) is a French right-handed sabre fencer. She represented France at the 2024 Summer Olympics. She won a gold medal in the team sabre at the 2025 World Fencing Championships.

== Career ==
Noutcha represented France at the 2024 Summer Olympics and served as a reserve for the women's team sabre that finished in fourth place. She replaced Cécilia Berder during the bronze medal match against Japan.

In June 2025, Noutcha competed at the 2025 European Fencing Championships and won a gold medal in the individual and team sabre events. The next month she competed at the 2025 World Fencing Championships and won a gold medal in the team sabre event.

In June 2026, she competed at the 2026 European Fencing Championships and won a silver medal in the team sabre event. The next month she competed at the 2026 World Fencing Championships and won a bronze medal in the team sabre event.
