= 2026 World Fencing Championships =

Sports event in Hong Kong

- Dates: 22–30 July
- Host city: Hong Kong
- Venue: AsiaWorld–Expo

The 2026 World Fencing Championships were held from 22 to 30 July 2026 in Hong Kong.

== Schedule ==
Twelve events were held.

Date	Round
22 July	Men's foil qualification
22 July	Women's épée qualification
23 July	Women's sabre qualification
23 July	Men's épée qualification
24 July	Women's foil qualification
24 July	Men's sabre qualification
25 July	Men's foil
25 July	Women's épée
26 July	Women's sabre
26 July	Men's épée
27 July	Women's foil
27 July	Men's sabre
28 July	Men's team foil
28 July	Women's team épée
29 July	Women's team sabre
29 July	Men's team épée
30 July	Women's team foil
30 July	Men's team sabre

== Medal summary ==
=== Medal table ===
* Host nation (Hong Kong)

Rank	Nation	Gold	Silver	Bronze	Total
1	Italy	4	4	0	8
2	South Korea	1	2	1	4
3	France	1	1	2	4
4	Hungary	1	0	2	3
5	Czech Republic	1	0	0	1
5	Germany	1	0	0	1
5	Kazakhstan	1	0	0	1
5	Russia	1	0	0	1
5	Switzerland	1	0	0	1
10	China	0	1	1	2
10	Ukraine	0	1	1	2
10	United States	0	1	1	2
13	Estonia	0	1	0	1
13	Hong Kong	0	1	0	1
15	Japan	0	0	4	4
16	Egypt	0	0	2	2
16	Romania	0	0	2	2
18	Poland	0	0	1	1
18	Saudi Arabia	0	0	1	1
Totals (19 entries)		12	12	18	42

=== Men ===
Event	Gold	Silver	Bronze
Individual épée	Lucas Malcotti; Switzerland	Davide Di Veroli; Italy	Masaru Yamada; Japan
Individual épée	Lucas Malcotti; Switzerland	Davide Di Veroli; Italy	Khalifah Al-Omairi; Saudi Arabia
Team épée	Kazakhstan; Ruslan Kurbanov; Kirill Prokhodov; Yerlik Sertay; Vadim Sharlaimov	Ukraine; Ievgen Makiienko; Nikita Koshman; Mykhailo Krasniuk; Roman Svichkar	Egypt; Mohamed El-Sayed; Mahmoud El-Sayed; Mahmoud Mohsen; Youssef Shamel
Individual foil	Alexander Choupenitch; Czech Republic	Filippo Macchi; Italy	Dániel Dósa; Hungary
Individual foil	Alexander Choupenitch; Czech Republic	Filippo Macchi; Italy	Kazuki Iimura; Japan
Team foil	Italy; Guillaume Bianchi; Filippo Macchi; Tommaso Marini; Tommaso Martini	Hong Kong; Cheung Ka Long; Ryan Choi; Harris Ho; Leung Chin Yu	United States; Nick Itkin; Bryce Louie; Alexander Massialas; Marcello Olivares
Individual sabre	Pavel Graudyn; Russia	Do Gyeong-dong; South Korea	Radu Nițu; Romania
Individual sabre	Pavel Graudyn; Russia	Do Gyeong-dong; South Korea	Mohamed Amer; Egypt
Team sabre	France; Rémi Garrigue; Jean-Philippe Patrice; Sébastien Patrice; Maxime Pianfetti	South Korea; Oh Sang-uk; Do Gyeong-dong; Park Sang-won; Hwang Hee-geun	Romania; Vlad Covaliu; George Dragomir; Răzvan Ursachi; Radu Nițu

=== Women ===
Event	Gold	Silver	Bronze
Individual épée	Song Se-ra; South Korea	Giulia Rizzi; Italy	Barbara Brych; Poland
Individual épée	Song Se-ra; South Korea	Giulia Rizzi; Italy	Tang Junyao; China
Team épée	Italy; Gaia Caforio; Rossella Fiamingo; Giulia Rizzi; Alberta Santuccio	Estonia; Irina Embrich; Julia Beljajeva; Katrina Lehis; Veronika Zuikova	South Korea; Yang Seung-hye; Lee Hye-in; Lim Tae-hee; Song Se-ra
Individual foil	Martina Favaretto; Italy	Arianna Errigo; Italy	Yuka Ueno; Japan
Individual foil	Martina Favaretto; Italy	Arianna Errigo; Italy	Alina Poloziuk; Ukraine
Team foil	Italy; Martina Batini; Anna Cristino; Arianna Errigo; Martina Favaretto	United States; Josephina Conway; Jaelyn Liu; Lauren Scruggs; Carolina Stutchbury	Japan; Sera Azuma; Komaki Kikuchi; Sumire Tsuji; Yuka Ueno
Individual sabre	Larissa Eifler; Germany	Sara Balzer; France	Sugár Katinka Battai; Hungary
Individual sabre	Larissa Eifler; Germany	Sara Balzer; France	Toscane Tori; France
Team sabre	Hungary; Sugár Katinka Battai; Anna Spiesz; Luca Szűcs; Renáta Katona	China; Pan Qimiao; Rao Xueyi; Wei Jiayi; Zhang Xinyi	France; Manon Brunet; Sara Balzer; Sarah Noutcha; Toscane Tori
