= Ievgen Makiienko =

Ukrainian fencer (born 1991)

Personal information
- Native name: Євген Борисович Макієнко
- Full name: Ievgen Borisovich Makiienko
- Born: 20 July 1991 (age 35)

Fencing career
- Sport: Fencing
- Country: Ukraine
- Weapon: Épée
- Hand: Right-handed
Medal record
Men's épée
Representing Ukraine
World Championships
Silver medal – second place	2026 Hong Kong	Team
European Championships
Bronze medal – third place	2026 Antony	Team

Ievgen Borisovich Makiienko (Ukrainian: Миха́йло Андрі́йович Красню́к); born 20 July 1991) is a Ukrainian right-handed épée fencer.

== Career ==
In June 2026, Makiienko competed at the 2026 European Fencing Championships and won a bronze medal in the team épée event. The next month he competed at the 2026 World Fencing Championships in the team épée and helped Ukraine advance to the finals in the event for the first time since 2019. During the final Ukraine lost to Kazakhstan and won a silver medal.
