= Rémi Garrigue =

French fencer (born 2004)

Personal information
- Born: 3 September 2004 (age 21)

Fencing career
- Sport: Fencing
- Country: France
- Weapon: Sabre
- Hand: Right-handed
Medal record
Men's sabre
Representing France
World Championships
Gold medal – first place	2026 Hong Kong	Team
European Championships
Gold medal – first place	2025 Genoa	Individual
Bronze medal – third place	2026 Antony	Team

Rémi Garrigue (born 3 September 2004) is a French right-handed sabre fencer.

== Career ==
In June 2025, Garrigue competed at the 2025 European Fencing Championships and won a gold medal in the individual sabre event.

In June 2026, he competed at the 2026 European Fencing Championships and won a bronze medal in the team sabre and a bronze medal in the team sabre event. The next month he competed at the 2026 World Fencing Championships and won a gold medal in the team sabre event.
