= Jean-Philippe Patrice =

French fencer

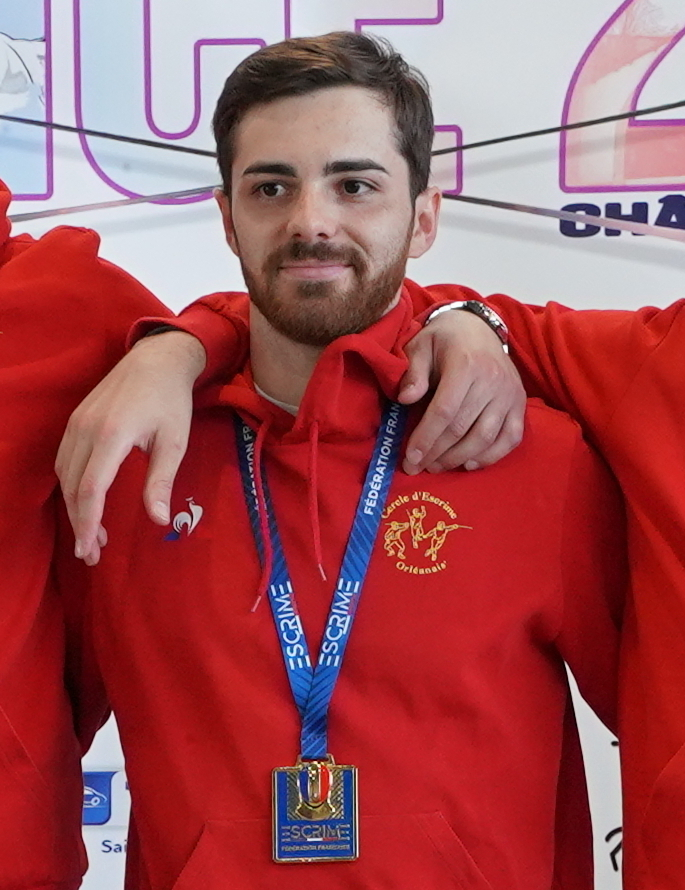
- Patrice in 2023

Personal information
- Born: 12 March 1997 (age 29) Marseille, France

Sport
- Country: France
- Sport: Fencing
Medal record
Men's sabre
Representing France
Olympic Games
Bronze medal – third place	2024 Paris	Team
World Championships
Gold medal – first place	2026 Hong Kong	Team
Silver medal – second place	2025 Tbilisi	Individual
European Championships
Gold medal – first place	2026 Antony	Individual
Bronze medal – third place	2024 Basel	Individual
Bronze medal – third place	2025 Genoa	Individual
Bronze medal – third place	2026 Antony	Team
FISU World University Games
Bronze medal – third place	2019 Naples	Team

Jean-Philippe Patrice (born 12 March 1997) is a French fencer. He competed at the 2024 Summer Olympics and won a bronze medal in the men's team sabre.

== Medal record ==
=== World Championship ===
Year	Location	Event	Position
2025	(Georgia (country)) Tbilisi, Georgia	Individual Men's Sabre	2nd
