= María Mariño (fencer) =

Spanish fencer

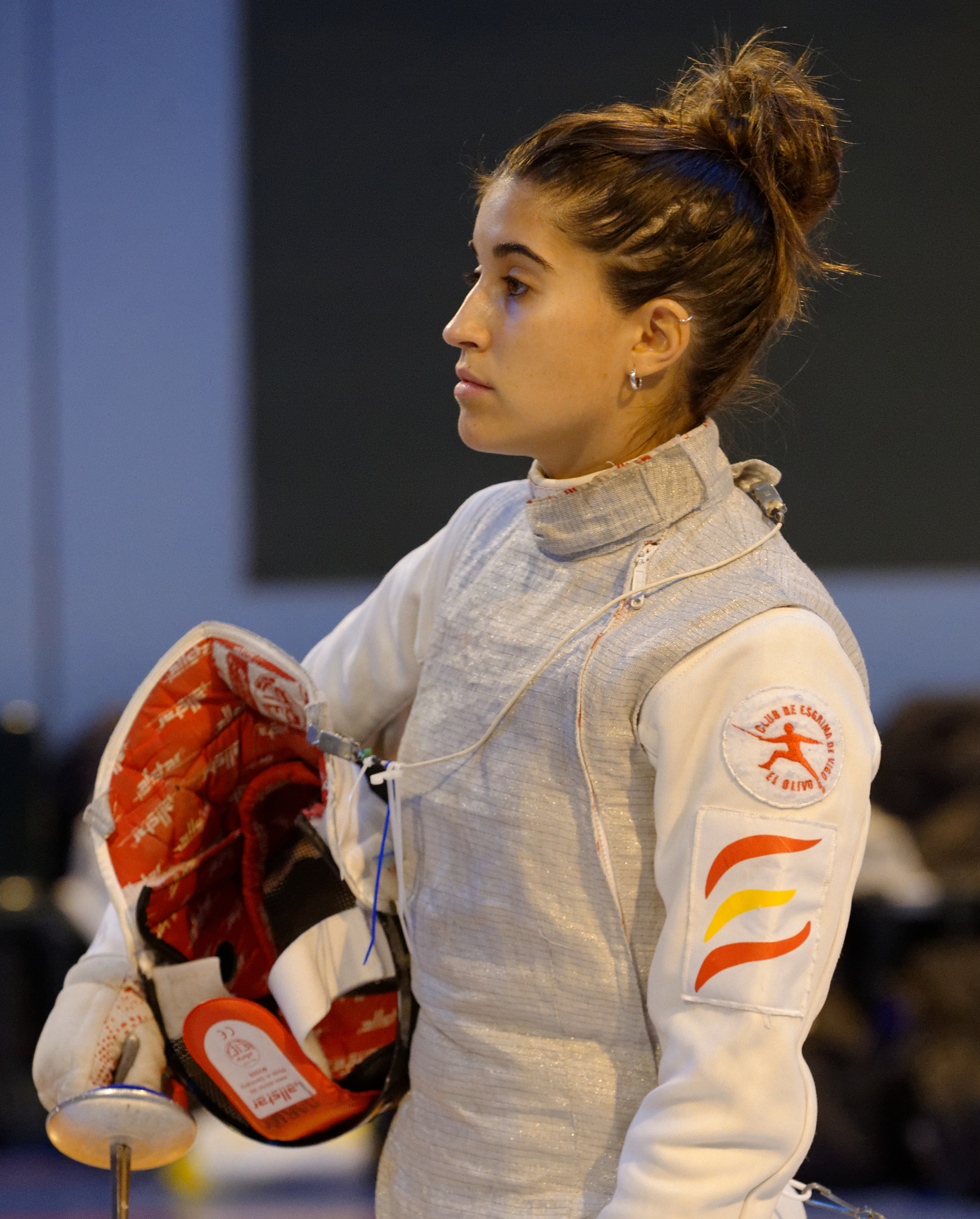
- Mariño in 2015

Personal information
- Born: María Mariño Blanco; 31 January 1993 (age 33) Pontevedra, Spain

Sport
- Country: Spain
- Sport: Fencing
Medal record
Representing Spain
Women's fencing
European Championships
Bronze medal – third place	2025 Genoa	Team
Bronze medal – third place	2026 Antony	Individual

María Mariño Blanco (born 31 January 1993) is a Spanish fencer. She competed at the 2025 European Fencing Championships, winning the bronze medal in the women's team foil event. She also competed at the 2026 European Fencing Championships, winning the bronze medal in the women's foil event.
