= Nikita Koshman =

Ukrainian fencer (born 2002)

Personal information
- Native name: Нікіта Олегович Кошман
- Full name: Nikita Olehovytj Kosjman
- Born: 22 June 2002 (age 24)

Fencing career
- Sport: Fencing
- Country: Ukraine
- Weapon: Épée
- Hand: Left-handed
Medal record
Men's épée
Representing Ukraine
World Championships
Silver medal – second place	2026 Hong Kong	Team
Bronze medal – third place	2025 Tbilisi	Individual
European Championships
Bronze medal – third place	2026 Antony	Team

Nikita Olehovytj Kosjman (Ukrainian: Нікіта Олегович Кошман); born 22 June 2002) is a Ukrainian left-handed épée fencer.

== Career ==
In July 2025, Koshman competed at the 2025 World Fencing Championships and won a bronze medal in the individual épée event.

In June 2026, he competed at the 2026 European Fencing Championships and won a bronze medal in the team épée event. The next month he competed at the 2026 World Fencing Championships in the team épée event and helped Ukraine advance to the finals in the event for the first time since 2019. During the final Ukraine lost to Kazakhstan and won a silver medal.
