= Éva Lacheray =

French fencer (born 2000)

Personal information
- Born: 11 March 2000 (age 26) Montbéliard, France

Fencing career
- Sport: Fencing
- Country: France
- Weapon: Foil
- Hand: Left-handed
- Club: Les Lions de Montbéliard
Medal record
Women's foil
Representing France
World Championships
Silver medal – second place	2025 Tbilisi	Team
European Championships
Gold medal – first place	2025 Genoa	Individual
Silver medal – second place	2025 Genoa	Team
Silver medal – second place	2026 Antony	Team

Éva Lacheray (born 11 March 2000) is a French left-handed foil fencer. She represented France at the 2024 Summer Olympics. She won a silver medal in the team foil event at the 2025 World Fencing Championships.

== Career ==
In June 2025, Lacheray competed at the 2025 European Fencing Championships and won a gold medal in the individual foil event and a silver medal in the team event. The next month she competed at the 2025 World Fencing Championships and won a silver medal in the team foil event.

In June 2025, she competed at the 2025 European Fencing Championships and won a silver medal in the team event.
