= Rafael Savin =

French fencer

Sport
- Country: France
- Sport: Fencing
Medal record
Representing France
Men's foil
European Games
Silver medal – second place	2023 Kraków–Małopolska	Team
European Championships
Gold medal – first place	2026 Antony	Individual
Silver medal – second place	2023 Kraków	Team
Silver medal – second place	2025 Genoa	Team
Silver medal – second place	2026 Antony	Team
Bronze medal – third place	2023 Plovdiv	Individual

Rafael Savin is a French fencer. He competed at the 2023 European Games, winning the silver medal in the men's team foil event. He also competed at the 2026 European Fencing Championships, winning the gold medal in the men's foil event.
