= Morgane Patru =

French fencer (born 1998)

Personal information
- Born: 7 February 1998 (age 28)

Fencing career
- Sport: Fencing
- Country: France
- Weapon: Foil
- Hand: Right-handed
Medal record
Women's foil
Representing France
World Championships
Silver medal – second place	2023 Milan	Team
Silver medal – second place	2025 Tbilisi	Team
European Games
Silver medal – second place	2023 Kraków–Małopolska	Team
European Championships
Silver medal – second place	2023 Kraków	Team
Silver medal – second place	2025 Genoa	Team
Universiade
Silver medal – second place	2019 Naples	Individual
Bronze medal – third place	2019 Naples	Team
Mediterranean Games
Silver medal – second place	2022 Oran	Individual

Morgane Patru (born 7 February 1998) is a French right-handed foil fencer. She is a two-time team silver medalist at the World Fencing Championships.

== Career ==
In June 2023, Patru competed at the 2023 European Games and won a silver medal in the team foil event. The next month she made her World Fencing Championships debut at the 2023 World Fencing Championships and won a silver medal in the team foil event.

In June 2025, Patru competed at the 2025 European Fencing Championships and won a silver medal in the team event. The next month she competed at the 2025 World Fencing Championships and won a silver medal in the team foil event.

== Medal record ==
=== World Championship ===
Year	Location	Event	Position
2025	(Georgia (country)) Tbilisi, Georgia	Team Women's Foil	2nd
