= George Dragomir (fencer) =

Romanian fencer (born 1999)

Personal information
- Born: 5 April 1999 (age 27)

Fencing career
- Sport: Fencing
- Country: Romania
- Weapon: Sabre
- Hand: Right-handed
Medal record
Men's sabre
Representing Romania
World Championships
Bronze medal – third place	2025 Tbilisi	Team
Bronze medal – third place	2026 Hong Kong	Team
European Championships
Silver medal – second place	2026 Antony	Team
Bronze medal – third place	2026 Antony	Individual

George Dragomir (born 5 April 1999) is an Romanian right-handed sabre fencer.

== Career ==
In July 2025, Dragomir competed at the 2025 World Fencing Championships and won a bronze medal in the team sabre event.

In June 2026, he competed at the 2026 European Fencing Championships and won a silver medal in the team sabre and a bronze medal in the individual sabre event.
