= Davide Di Veroli =

Italian fencer (born 2001)

Personal information
- Nationality: Italian
- Born: 18 August 2001 (age 25) Rome, Italy
- Height: 1.76 m (5 ft 9 in)

Fencing career
- Sport: Fencing
- Country: Italy
- Weapon: Épée
- Club: Fiamme Oro
- Personal coach: Mario Ferrarese
- FIE ranking: current ranking
Medal record
Men's épée
Representing Italy
World Championships
Gold medal – first place	2023 Milan	Team
Silver medal – second place	2022 Cairo	Team
Silver medal – second place	2023 Milan	Individual
Silver medal – second place	2026 Hong Kong	Individual
European Games
Bronze medal – third place	2023 Kraków–Małopolska	Team
European Championships
Gold medal – first place	2022 Antalya	Team
Gold medal – first place	2023 Plovdiv	Individual
Gold medal – first place	2026 Antony	Team
Silver medal – second place	2024 Basel	Team
Bronze medal – third place	2023 Kraków	Team
Bronze medal – third place	2025 Genoa	Team
Youth Olympic Games
Gold medal – first place	2018 Buenos Aires	Individual
Junior World Championships
Silver medal – second place	2018 Verona	Individual
Silver medal – second place	2019 Toruń	Individual
Bronze medal – third place	2018 Verona	Team
Cadet World Championships
Gold medal – first place	2017 Plovdiv	Individual
Gold medal – first place	2018 Verona	Individual
Representing (International Olympic Committee) Mixed-NOCs
Youth Olympic Games
Gold medal – first place	2018 Buenos Aires	Mixed team

Davide Di Veroli (born 18 August 2001) is an Italian left-handed épée fencer and 2022 team European champion.

== Medal record ==
=== World Championship ===
Year	Location	Event	Position
2022	Cairo, Egypt	Team Men's Épée	2nd

=== European Championship ===
Year	Location	Event	Position
2022	Antalya, Turkey	Team Men's Épée	1st

=== Grand Prix ===
Date	Location	Event	Position
2022-01-28	Doha, Qatar	Individual Men's Épée	3rd

=== World Cup ===
Date	Location	Event	Position
2019-01-10	Heidenheim, Germany	Individual Men's Épée	2nd
