= Martina Batini =

Italian foil fencer

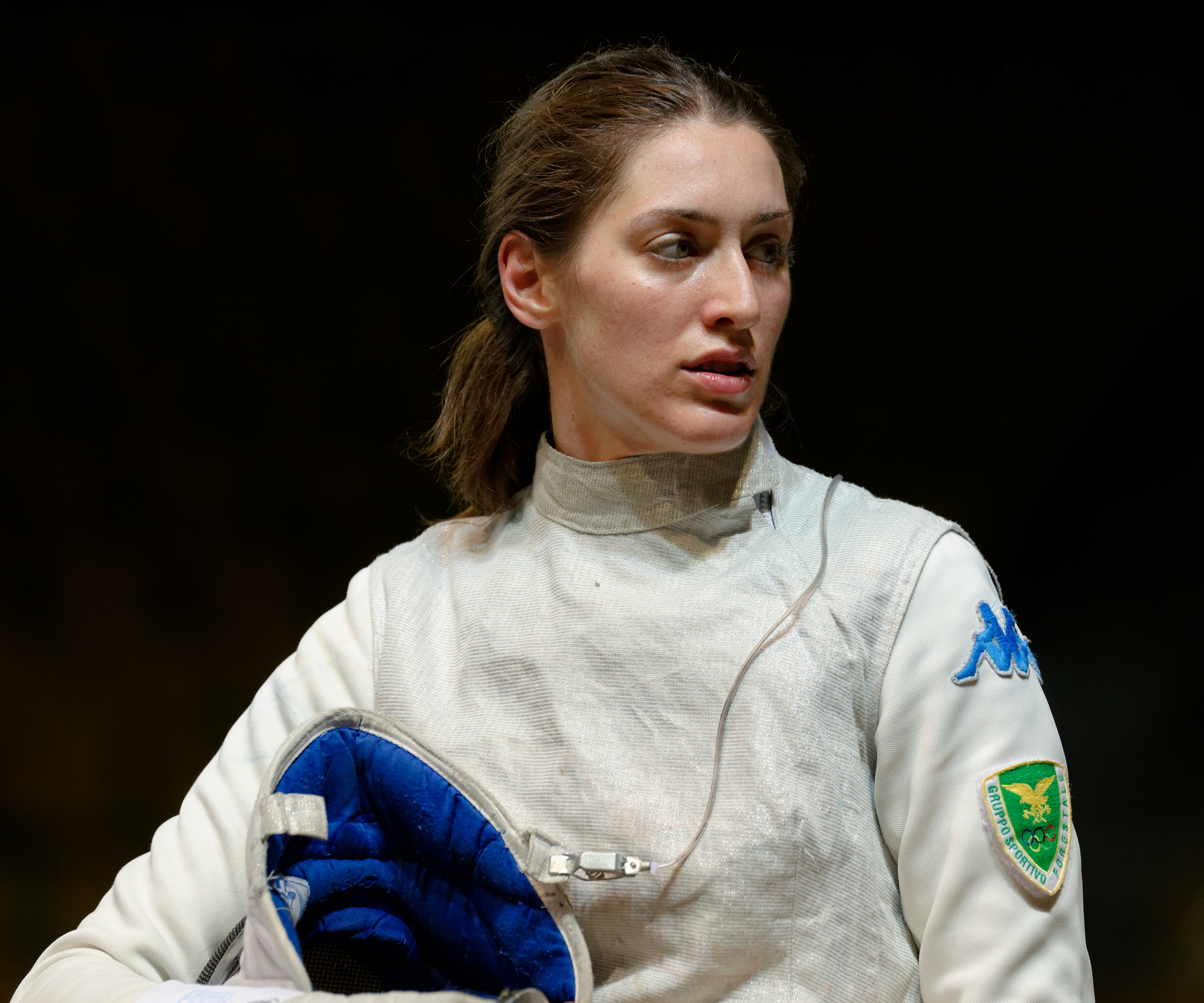
- Batini at the 2014 European Fencing Championships

Personal information
- Born: 17 April 1989 (age 37) Pisa, Italy

Fencing career
- Sport: Fencing
- Country: Italy
- Weapon: Foil
- Hand: right-handed
- Club: G.S. Forestale
- Head coach: Simone Piccini
- FIE ranking: current ranking
Medal record
Women's foil
Representing Italy
Olympic Games
Bronze medal – third place	2020 Tokyo	Team
World Championships
Gold medal – first place	2014 Kazan	Team
Gold medal – first place	2015 Moscow	Team
Gold medal – first place	2017 Leipzig	Team
Gold medal – first place	2026 Hong Kong	Team
Silver medal – second place	2014 Kazan	Individual
Silver medal – second place	2016 Rio de Janeiro	Team
European Games
Gold medal – first place	2023 Kraków–Małopolska	Team
European Championships
Gold medal – first place	2014 Strasbourg	Team
Gold medal – first place	2015 Montreux	Team
Gold medal – first place	2017 Tbilisi	Team
Gold medal – first place	2023 Plovdiv	Individual
Gold medal – first place	2023 Kraków	Team
Gold medal – first place	2025 Genoa	Team
Gold medal – first place	2026 Antony	Team
Silver medal – second place	2016 Toruń	Team
Silver medal – second place	2014 Strasbourg	Individual
Bronze medal – third place	2025 Genoa	Individual

Martina Batini (born 17 April 1989) is an Italian right-handed foil fencer, two-time team European champion, three-time team world champion, and 2021 team Olympic bronze medalist.

== Career ==
Batini first competed both in foil and épée as a child, then specialized in foil. She won in 2006 the gold medal both in the Cadets Italian National Championships and the Cadets World Championships at Taebaek City. In 2008, she became Junior European Champion at Amsterdam. The year after, she won the U23 European Championship in Debrecen and took the third place at the Junior World Championships in Belfast.

Amongst seniors, she made her breakthrough during the 2013–14 season. She took her first World Cup with a gold medal in Tauberbischofsheim after defeating reigning World champion Arianna Errigo and reigning Olympic champion Elisa Di Francisca. A week later she won the National Italian Championships in Acireale. She also took a bronze medal at the SK Trophée in Seoul. In the 2014 European Championships in Strasbourg, she met Di Francisca in the final. Batini took a 5–1 lead, but Di Francisca scored 14 hits in a row, dooming Batini to the silver medal. In the team event, the “Dream Team” formed by Di Francisca, Errigo, Valentina Vezzali and Batini were largely given favourites, having won gold in every World Cup of the season. They cruised to the final and met Russia, who kept them at bay for the first six relays. In her last leg, Batini prevailed 7–4, giving Italy the lead for the first time in the match. A 10-hit rally by Di Francisca in the last bout allowed Italy to retain the European title.

Batini obtained in 2014 a master's degree in engineering management from the University of Pisa. Her sister Camilla is an épée fencer.

== Medal record ==
=== Olympic Games ===
Year	Location	Event	Position
2021	Tokyo, Japan	Team Women's Foil	3rd

=== World Championship ===
Year	Location	Event	Position
2014	Kazan, Russia	Individual Women's Foil	2nd
2014	Kazan, Russia	Team Women's Foil	1st
2015	Moscow, Russia	Team Women's Foil	1st
2016	Rio de Janeiro, Brazil	Team Women's Foil	2nd
2017	Leipzig, Germany	Team Women's Foil	1st

=== European Championship ===
Year	Location	Event	Position
2014	Strasbourg, France	Individual Women's Foil	2nd
2015	Montreux, Switzerland	Team Women's Foil	1st
2016	Toruń, Poland	Team Women's Foil	2nd
2017	(Georgia (country)) Tbilisi, Georgia	Team Women's Foil	1st

=== Grand Prix ===
Date	Location	Event	Position
2014-04-26	Seoul, South Korea	Individual Women's Foil	3rd
2016-06-03	Shanghai, China	Individual Women's Foil	3rd
2017-05-19	Shanghai, China	Individual Women's Foil	1st

=== World Cup ===
Date	Location	Event	Position
2014-03-14	Tauberbischofsheim, Germany	Individual Women's Foil	1st
2015-10-16	Cancún, Mexico	Individual Women's Foil	3rd
2016-01-15	Gdańsk, Poland	Individual Women's Foil	3rd
2016-02-05	Algier, Algeria	Individual Women's Foil	2nd
2016-10-14	Cancún, Mexico	Individual Women's Foil	3rd
2017-10-13	Cancún, Mexico	Individual Women's Foil	3rd
2018-11-23	Algier, Algeria	Individual Women's Foil	3rd
2019-12-13	Saint-Maur-des-Fossés, France	Individual Women's Foil	2nd
2022-04-15	Belgrade, Serbia	Individual Women's Foil	3rd
