= Sébastien Patrice =

French fencer (born 2000)

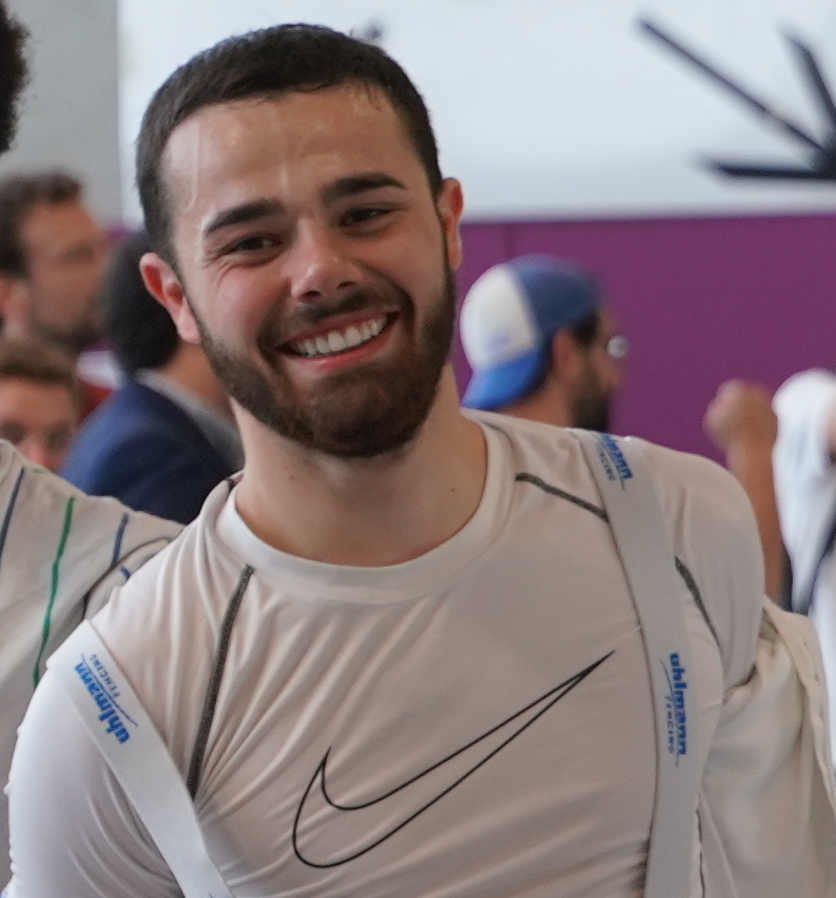
- Patrice in 2023

Personal information
- Nationality: France
- Born: 7 April 2000 (age 26) Marseille, France

Sport
- Sport: Fencing
Medal record
Men's sabre
Representing (France) France
Olympic Games
Bronze medal – third place	2024 Paris	Team
World Championships
Gold medal – first place	2026 Hong Kong	Team
European Games
Gold medal – first place	2023 Kraków–Małopolska	Team
Junior World Championships
Silver medal – second place	2018 Verona	Individual
European Championships
Gold medal – first place	2023 Kraków	Team
Bronze medal – third place	2023 Plovdiv	Individual
Bronze medal – third place	2026 Antony	Team
FISU World University Games
Bronze medal – third place	2019 Naples	Team

Sébastien Patrice (born 7 April 2000) is a French fencer. He competed in the 2024 Summer Olympics.
