= Michele Gallo =

Italian fencer (born 2001)

Personal information
- Born: 18 May 2001 (age 25)
- Home town: Rome, Italy

Fencing career
- Sport: Fencing
- Country: Italy
- Weapon: Sabre
- Hand: Right-handed
- Club: CS Carabinieri
- Head coach: Lucio Landi
Medal record
Men's sabre
Representing Italy
World Championships
Gold medal – first place	2025 Tbilisi	Team
Bronze medal – third place	2022 Cairo	Team
European Championships
Silver medal – second place	2025 Genoa	Team
European Games
Silver medal – second place	2023 Kraków–Małopolska	Team
Junior World Championships
Gold medal – first place	2019 Toruń	Team

Michele Gallo (born 18 May 2001) is an Italian right-handed sabre fencer. He represented Italy at the 2024 Summer Olympics.

== Career ==
In July 2024, Gallo represented Italy at the 2024 Summer Olympics and finished in fifth place in the team sabre event.

In June 2025, Gallo competed at the 2025 European Fencing Championships and won a silver medal in the team event. The next month he competed at the 2025 World Fencing Championships and won a gold medal in the team sabre event.

== Medal record ==
=== World Championship ===
Year	Location	Event	Position
2025	(Georgia (country)) Tbilisi, Georgia	Team Men's Sabre	1st
