= Women's sabre at the 2025 World Fencing Championships =

- Venue: Olympic Palace
- Location: Tbilisi, Georgia
- Dates: 26 July (preliminaries); 27 July (finals)
- Competitors: 64 from 26 nations

Medalists
gold medal	Yana Egorian	Individual Neutral Athletes
silver medal	Zuzanna Cieślar	Poland
bronze medal	Pan Qimiao	China
bronze medal	Alina Komashchuk	Ukraine

The Women's sabre competition at the 2025 World Fencing Championships was held on 26 and 27 July 2025.

== Draw ==
=== Finals ===
Semifinals
Yana Egorian	15
(China) Pan Qimiao	9
(Poland) Zuzanna Cieślar	15
(Ukraine) Alina Komashchuk	12

Final
Yana Egorian	15
(Poland) Zuzanna Cieślar	11

=== Top half ===
==== Section 1 ====
Round of 64
(South Korea) Jeon Ha-young	15
(Ukraine) Yuliya Bakastova	8
(Venezuela) Katherine Paredes	9
(France) Toscane Tori	15
(Spain) Celia Pérez	13
(United States) Maia Chamberlain	15
(France) Faustine Clapier	10
(Spain) Araceli Navarro	15
(South Korea) Choi Se-bin	10
(Kazakhstan) Anastassiya Gulik	15
(Azerbaijan) Sabina Karimova	9
(Italy) Eloisa Passaro	15
(Hungary) Liza Pusztai	11
Yana Egorian	15
Aleksandra Mikhailova	15
(Spain) Lucía Martín-Portugués	9

Round of 32
(South Korea) Jeon Ha-young	11
(France) Toscane Tori	15
(United States) Maia Chamberlain	11
(Spain) Araceli Navarro	15
(Kazakhstan) Anastassiya Gulik	15
(Italy) Eloisa Passaro	12
Yana Egorian	15
Aleksandra Mikhailova	6

Round of 16
(France) Toscane Tori	15
(Spain) Araceli Navarro	13
(Kazakhstan) Anastassiya Gulik	9
Yana Egorian	15

Quarterfinals
(France) Toscane Tori	9
Yana Egorian	15

==== Section 2 ====
Round of 64
(Greece) Despina Georgiadou	12
(China) Pan Qimiao	15
(Bulgaria) Olga Hramova	13
(Puerto Rico) Gabriela Hwang	15
(Germany) Larissa Eifler	15
(United Kingdom) Caitlin Maxwell	10
(Germany) Julika Funke	6
(Turkey) Nisanur Erbil	15
(South Korea) Kim Jeong-mi	15
(Canada) Madison Thurgood	3
(Poland) Sylwia Matuszak	15
(China) Rao Xueyi	7
(Italy) Mariella Viale	15
(United States) Siobhan Sullivan	8
(Azerbaijan) Palina Kaspiarovich	8
(Bulgaria) Yoana Ilieva	15

Round of 32
(China) Pan Qimiao	15
(Puerto Rico) Gabriela Hwang	13
(Germany) Larissa Eifler	15
(Turkey) Nisanur Erbil	10
(South Korea) Kim Jeong-mi	9
(Poland) Sylwia Matuszak	15
(Italy) Mariella Viale	12
(Bulgaria) Yoana Ilieva	15

Round of 16
(China) Pan Qimiao	15
(Germany) Larissa Eifler	10
(Poland) Sylwia Matuszak	5
(Bulgaria) Yoana Ilieva	15

Quarterfinals
(China) Pan Qimiao	15
(Bulgaria) Yoana Ilieva	14

=== Bottom half ===
==== Section 3 ====
Round of 64
(France) Sarah Noutcha	15
(Kazakhstan) Karina Dospay	7
(Mexico) Natalia Botello	15
(Georgia (country)) Lika Jijieishvili	6
(South Korea) Seo Ji-yeon	15
(Uzbekistan) Luisa Herrera	5
(Japan) Yui Sano	5
(Hungary) Sugár Katinka Battai	15
(Greece) Theodora Gkountoura	6
(Japan) Yuina Kaneko	15
(Kazakhstan) Tatyana Prikhodko	5
(United States) Alexandra Lee	15
(China) Zhang Xinyi	10
(Poland) Zuzanna Cieślar	15
(Ukraine) Daria Gontsova	9
(Hungary) Luca Szűcs	15

Round of 32
(France) Sarah Noutcha	15
(Mexico) Natalia Botello	9
(South Korea) Seo Ji-yeon	11
(Hungary) Sugár Katinka Battai	15
(Japan) Yuina Kaneko	15
(United States) Alexandra Lee	14
(Poland) Zuzanna Cieślar	15
(Hungary) Luca Szűcs	12

Round of 16
(France) Sarah Noutcha	15
(Hungary) Sugár Katinka Battai	6
(Japan) Yuina Kaneko	12
(Poland) Zuzanna Cieślar	15

Quarterfinals
(France) Sarah Noutcha	12
(Poland) Zuzanna Cieślar	15

==== Section 4 ====
Round of 64
(France) Sara Balzer	15
(Italy) Chiara Mormile	11
(Hong Kong) Summer Sit	15
(Poland) Angelika Wątor	12
(Germany) Felice Herbon	15
(Uzbekistan) Samira Shokirova	12
(Spain) Elena Hernández	10
(Italy) Michela Battiston	15
(Ukraine) Alina Komashchuk	15
(Germany) Elisabeth Gette	7
Olga Nikitina	14
(China) Fu Ying	15
(Ukraine) Oleksandra Bondar	11
(Hungary) Renáta Katona	15
(India) C. A. Bhavani Devi	10
(Japan) Misaki Emura	15

Round of 32
(France) Sara Balzer	15
(Hong Kong) Summer Sit	11
(Germany) Felice Herbon	13
(Italy) Michela Battiston	15
(Ukraine) Alina Komashchuk	15
(China) Fu Ying	6
(Hungary) Renáta Katona	14
(Japan) Misaki Emura	15

Round of 16
(France) Sara Balzer	15
(Italy) Michela Battiston	14
(Ukraine) Alina Komashchuk	15
(Japan) Misaki Emura	12

Quarterfinals
(France) Sara Balzer	7
(Ukraine) Alina Komashchuk	15
