= Women's sabre at the 2026 World Fencing Championships =

- Venue: AsiaWorld–Expo
- Location: Hong Kong
- Dates: 23 July (preliminaries); 26 July (finals)
- Competitors: 134 from 47 nations

Medalists
gold medal	Larissa Eifler	Germany
silver medal	Sara Balzer	France
bronze medal	Sugár Katinka Battai	Hungary
bronze medal	Toscane Tori	France

The Women's sabre competition at the 2026 World Fencing Championships was held on 23 and 26 July 2026.

== Draw ==
=== Finals ===
Semifinals
(Germany) Larissa Eifler	15
(Hungary) Sugár Katinka Battai	11
(France) Toscane Tori	14
(France) Sara Balzer	15

Final
(Germany) Larissa Eifler	15
(France) Sara Balzer	10

=== Top half ===
==== Section 1 ====
Round of 64
(Russia) Yana Egorian	15
(Bulgaria) Veronika Vasileva	9
(France) Manon Apithy	15
(Russia) Olga Nikitina	12
(Germany) Larissa Eifler	15
(Poland) Julia Cieślar	6
(Mexico) Natalia Botello	15
(Spain) Araceli Navarro	12
(Japan) Misaki Emura	15
(Azerbaijan) Zarifa Huseynova	11
(Singapore) Juliet Heng	15
(Russia) Aleksandra Mikhailova	14
(Ukraine) Oleksandra Bondar	11
(South Korea) Choi Se-bin	15
(Argentina) María Perroni	11
(Ukraine) Alina Komashchuk	15

Round of 32
(Russia) Yana Egorian	12
(France) Manon Apithy	15
(Germany) Larissa Eifler	15
(Mexico) Natalia Botello	7
(Japan) Misaki Emura	15
(Singapore) Juliet Heng	12
(South Korea) Choi Se-bin	15
(Ukraine) Alina Komashchuk	12

Round of 16
(France) Manon Apithy	12
(Germany) Larissa Eifler	15
(Japan) Misaki Emura	9
(South Korea) Choi Se-bin	15

Quarterfinals
(Germany) Larissa Eifler	15
(South Korea) Choi Se-bin	10

==== Section 2 ====
Round of 64
(Russia) Alina Mikhailova	15
(Italy) Manuela Spica	9
(Uzbekistan) Gulistan Perdebaeva	10
(Romania) Amalia Covaliu	15
(Japan) Yui Sano	15
(Germany) Julika Funke	12
(Kazakhstan) Aigerim Sarybay	10
(South Korea) Jeon Ha-young	15
(United States) Maia Chamberlain	15
(Ukraine) Daria Gontsova	12
(Venezuela) Katherine Paredes	7
(China) Rao Xueyi	15
(Italy) Mariella Viale	15
(United States) Siobhan Sullivan	10
(Kazakhstan) Anastassiya Gulik	7
(Hungary) Sugár Katinka Battai	15

Round of 32
(Russia) Alina Mikhailova	15
(Romania) Amalia Covaliu	8
(Japan) Yui Sano	9
(South Korea) Jeon Ha-young	15
(United States) Maia Chamberlain	15
(China) Rao Xueyi	10
(Italy) Mariella Viale	7
(Hungary) Sugár Katinka Battai	15

Round of 16
(Russia) Alina Mikhailova	15
(South Korea) Jeon Ha-young	7
(United States) Maia Chamberlain	13
(Hungary) Sugár Katinka Battai	15

Quarterfinals
(Russia) Alina Mikhailova	11
(Hungary) Sugár Katinka Battai	15

=== Bottom half ===
==== Section 3 ====
Round of 64
(France) Sarah Noutcha	15
(Uzbekistan) Fernanda Herrera	9
(Hungary) Anna Spiesz	14
(Bulgaria) Olga Hramova	15
(Turkey) Nisanur Erbil	15
(Uzbekistan) Ayakoz Jumamuratova	10
(United States) Sophie Liu	15
(Poland) Zuzanna Cieślar	9
(France) Toscane Tori	15
(Japan) Yuina Kaneko	11
(Hungary) Renáta Katona	15
(Japan) Seri Ozaki	11
(China) Zhang Xinyi	6
(Hong Kong) Summer Sit	15
(Egypt) Nagwa Nofal	12
(Spain) Lucía Martín-Portugués	15

Round of 32
(France) Sarah Noutcha	15
(Bulgaria) Olga Hramova	7
(Turkey) Nisanur Erbil	10
(United States) Sophie Liu	15
(France) Toscane Tori	15
(Hungary) Renáta Katona	12
(Hong Kong) Summer Sit	11
(Spain) Lucía Martín-Portugués	15

Round of 16
(France) Sarah Noutcha	15
(United States) Sophie Liu	13
(France) Toscane Tori	15
(Spain) Lucía Martín-Portugués	10

Quarterfinals
(France) Sarah Noutcha	12
(France) Toscane Tori	15

==== Section 4 ====
Round of 64
(Italy) Michela Battiston	15
(Kazakhstan) Karina Dospay	7
(Spain) Celia Pérez	10
(Hungary) Luca Szűcs	15
(Azerbaijan) Palina Kaspiarovich	15
(Turkey) Nil Güngör	8
(Germany) Felice Herbon	10
(France) Sara Balzer	15
(China) Pan Qimiao	15
(Bulgaria) Emma Neikova	13
(South Korea) Seo Ji-yeon	9
(Uzbekistan) Zaynab Dayibekova	15
(Poland) Angelika Wątor	15
(Spain) Elena Hernández	8
(Ukraine) Viktoriia Korotchenko	5
(Bulgaria) Yoana Ilieva	15

Round of 32
(Italy) Michela Battiston	15
(Hungary) Luca Szűcs	12
(Azerbaijan) Palina Kaspiarovich	6
(France) Sara Balzer	15
(China) Pan Qimiao	10
(Uzbekistan) Zaynab Dayibekova	15
(Poland) Angelika Wątor	13
(Bulgaria) Yoana Ilieva	15

Round of 16
(Italy) Michela Battiston	7
(France) Sara Balzer	15
(Uzbekistan) Zaynab Dayibekova	15
(Bulgaria) Yoana Ilieva	13

Quarterfinals
(France) Sara Balzer	15
(Uzbekistan) Zaynab Dayibekova	8
