= Fencing at the 2026 Asian Games – Women's individual sabre =

Women's individual sabre at the 2026 Asian Games
- Venue: Aichi Sky Expo Hall F
- Date: 24 September 2026
- Competitors: 24 from 13 nations

Medalists
gold medal	Misaki Emura	Japan
silver medal	Zaynab Dayibekova	Uzbekistan
bronze medal	Rao Xueyi	China
bronze medal	Pan Qimiao	China

The women's individual sabre competition at the 2026 Asian Games in Nagoya was held on 24 September 2026 at the Aichi Sky Expo Hall F. Japan's Misaki Emura defeated Zaynab Dayibekova of Uzbekistan 15–14 in the final to win the gold medal.

== Schedule ==
All times are Japan Standard Time (UTC+09:00)

Date	Time	Event
Thursday, 24 September 2026	11:45	Round of pools
Thursday, 24 September 2026	13:40	Table of 32
Thursday, 24 September 2026	14:15	Table of 16
Thursday, 24 September 2026	15:05	Quarterfinals
Thursday, 24 September 2026	17:40	Semifinals
Thursday, 24 September 2026	18:40	Gold medal bout

== Results ==
=== Round of pools ===
==== Pool 1 ====
Athlete	INA	JPN	THA	PHI	KOR	HKG
Nia Ayu Agustina (INA)	—	2–5	5–4	4–5	0–5	2–5
Yuina Kaneko (JPN)	5–2	—	5–3	5–4	3–5	5–4
Tonkhaw Phokaew (THA)	4–5	3–5	—	5–1	4–5	4–5
Jylyn Nicanor (PHI)	5–4	4–5	1–5	—	3–5	2–5
Jeon Ha-young (KOR)	5–0	5–3	5–4	5–3	—	3–5
Summer Fay Sit (HKG)	5–2	4–5	5–4	5–2	5–3	—

Legend: Blue = left column team win; Red = top row team win.

==== Pool 2 ====
Athlete	PHI	IND	JPN	SGP	CHN	INA
Queen Denise Dalmacio (PHI)	—	2–5	0–5	4–5	5–2	5–2
Shreya Gupta (IND)	5–2	—	0–5	5–4	3–5	5–1
Misaki Emura (JPN)	5–0	5–0	—	5–3	2–5	5–1
Juliet Heng (SGP)	5–4	4–5	3–5	—	3–5	5–1
Pan Qimiao (CHN)	2–5	5–3	5–2	5–3	—	5–0
Reni Anggraini (INA)	2–5	1–5	1–5	1–5	0–5	—

Legend: Blue = left column team win; Red = top row team win.

==== Pool 3 ====
Athlete	KAZ	UZB	HKG	SGP	MGL	CHN
Anastassiya Gulik (KAZ)	—	2–5	3–5	3–5	5–4	5–3
Gulistan Perdebaeva (UZB)	5–2	—	5–4	5–3	5–4	1–5
Laren Leung (HKG)	5–3	4–5	—	5–0	5–2	3–5
Jia En Jae Lim (SGP)	5–3	3–5	0–5	—	1–5	2–5
Oulen Tugsjargal (MGL)	4–5	4–5	2–5	5–1	—	3–5
Rao Xueyi (CHN)	3–5	5–1	5–3	5–2	5–3	—

Legend: Blue = left column team win; Red = top row team win.

==== Pool 4 ====
Athlete	THA	IRI	KOR	IND	KAZ	UZB
Arisara Somphao (THA)	—	5–2	1–5	2–5	3–5	1–5
Najmeh Sazanjian (IRI)	2–5	—	5–4	5–4	3–5	3–5
Kim Jeong-mi (KOR)	5–1	4–5	—	5–1	3–5	2–5
Bhavani Devi (IND)	5–2	4–5	1–5	—	5–4	4–5
Aigerim Sarybay (KAZ)	5–3	5–3	5–3	4–5	—	3–5
Zaynab Dayibekova (UZB)	5–1	5–3	5–2	5–4	5–3	—

Legend: Blue = left column team win; Red = top row team win.

==== Summary ====
Rank	Pool	Athlete	W	L	W/M	TD	TF
1	4	Zaynab Dayibekova (UZB)	5	0	1.000	+12	25
2	2	Misaki Emura (JPN)	4	1	0.800	+13	22
3	3	Rao Xueyi (CHN)	4	1	0.800	+9	23
4	2	Pan Qimiao (CHN)	4	1	0.800	+9	22
5	1	Summer Fay Sit (HKG)	4	1	0.800	+8	24
6	1	Jeon Ha-young (KOR)	4	1	0.800	+8	23
7	1	Yuina Kaneko (JPN)	4	1	0.800	+5	23
8	3	Gulistan Perdebaeva (UZB)	4	1	0.800	+3	21
9	3	Laren Leung (HKG)	3	2	0.600	+7	22
10	4	Aigerim Sarybay (KAZ)	3	2	0.600	+3	22
11	2	Shreya Gupta (IND)	3	2	0.600	+1	18
12	4	Kim Jeong-mi (KOR)	2	3	0.400	+2	19
13	2	Juliet Heng (SGP)	2	3	0.400	+0	20
14	4	Bhavani Devi (IND)	2	3	0.400	−2	19
15	2	Queen Denise Dalmacio (PHI)	2	3	0.400	−3	16
16	3	Anastassiya Gulik (KAZ)	2	3	0.400	−4	18
17	4	Najmeh Sazanjian (IRI)	2	3	0.400	−5	18
18	1	Tonkhaw Phokaew (THA)	1	4	0.200	−1	20
19	3	Oulen Tugsjargal (MGL)	1	4	0.200	−3	18
20	1	Jylyn Nicanor (PHI)	1	4	0.200	−9	15
21	4	Arisara Somphao (THA)	1	4	0.200	−10	12
22	1	Nia Ayu Agustina (INA)	1	4	0.200	−11	13
23	3	Jia En Jae Lim (SGP)	1	4	0.200	−12	11
24	2	Reni Anggraini (INA)	0	5	0.000	−20	5

=== Knockout round ===
==== Final ====
Gold medal bout
1	Zaynab Dayibekova (UZB)	14
2	Misaki Emura (JPN)	15

==== Top half ====
Table of 32
17	Najmeh Sazanjian (IRI)	15
16	Anastassiya Gulik (KAZ)	13
13	Juliet Heng (SGP)	15
20	Jylyn Nicanor (PHI)	10

Table of 16
1	Zaynab Dayibekova (UZB)	15
17	Najmeh Sazanjian (IRI)	2
9	Laren Leung (HKG)	11
8	Gulistan Perdebaeva (UZB)	15
5	Summer Fay Sit (HKG)	15
12	Kim Jeong-mi (KOR)	5
13	Juliet Heng (SGP)	9
4	Pan Qimiao (CHN)	15

Quarterfinals
1	Zaynab Dayibekova (UZB)	15
8	Gulistan Perdebaeva (UZB)	14
5	Summer Fay Sit (HKG)	13
4	Pan Qimiao (CHN)	15

Semifinals
1	Zaynab Dayibekova (UZB)	15
4	Pan Qimiao (CHN)	8

==== Bottom half ====
Table of 32
19	Oulen Tugsjargal (MGL)	8
14	Bhavani Devi (IND)	15
15	Queen Denise Dalmacio (PHI)	15
18	Tonkhaw Phokaew (THA)	14

Table of 16
3	Rao Xueyi (CHN)	15
14	Bhavani Devi (IND)	5
11	Shreya Gupta (IND)	6
6	Jeon Ha-young (KOR)	15
7	Yuina Kaneko (JPN)	15
10	Aigerim Sarybay (KAZ)	14
15	Queen Denise Dalmacio (PHI)	2
2	Misaki Emura (JPN)	15

Quarterfinals
3	Rao Xueyi (CHN)	15
6	Jeon Ha-young (KOR)	11
7	Yuina Kaneko (JPN)	9
2	Misaki Emura (JPN)	15

Semifinals
3	Rao Xueyi (CHN)	11
2	Misaki Emura (JPN)	15

== Final standing ==
Rank	Athlete
1st place, gold medalist(s)	Misaki Emura (JPN)
2nd place, silver medalist(s)	Zaynab Dayibekova (UZB)
3rd place, bronze medalist(s)	Rao Xueyi (CHN)
3rd place, bronze medalist(s)	Pan Qimiao (CHN)
5	Summer Fay Sit (HKG)
6	Jeon Ha-young (KOR)
7	Yuina Kaneko (JPN)
8	Gulistan Perdebaeva (UZB)
9	Laren Leung (HKG)
10	Aigerim Sarybay (KAZ)
11	Shreya Gupta (IND)
12	Kim Jeong-mi (KOR)
13	Juliet Heng (SGP)
14	Bhavani Devi (IND)
15	Queen Denise Dalmacio (PHI)
16	Najmeh Sazanjian (IRI)
17	Anastassiya Gulik (KAZ)
18	Tonkhaw Phokaew (THA)
19	Oulen Tugsjargal (MGL)
20	Jylyn Nicanor (PHI)
21	Arisara Somphao (THA)
22	Nia Ayu Agustina (INA)
23	Jia En Jae Lim (SGP)
24	Reni Anggraini (INA)
