= Fencing at the 2023 Pan American Games – Women's sabre =

Women's sabre at the 2023 Pan American Games
- Venue: Paralympic Training Center
- Dates: October 31
- Competitors: 18 from 10 nations

Medalists
Gold medal	Magda Skarbonkiewicz	United States
Silver medal	Maia Chamberlain	United States
Bronze medal	Julieta Toledo	Mexico
Bronze medal	Leidis Veranes	Cuba

The women's sabre competition of the fencing events at the 2023 Pan American Games was held on October 31 at the Paralympic Training Center.

The sabre competition consisted of a qualification round followed by a single-elimination bracket with a bronze medal match between the two semifinal losers. Fencing was done to 15 touches or to the completion of three three-minute rounds if neither fencer reached 15 touches by then. At the end of time, the higher-scoring fencer was the winner; a tie resulted in an additional one-minute sudden-death time period. This sudden-death period was further modified by the selection of a draw-winner beforehand; if neither fencer scored a touch during the minute, the predetermined draw-winner won the bout.

== Schedule ==
Date	Time	Round
October 31, 2023	10:40	Qualification pools
October 31, 2023	13:15	Round of 16
October 31, 2023	14:50	Quarterfinals
October 31, 2023	17:00	Semifinals
October 31, 2023	18:45	Final

== Results ==
=== Qualification ===
All 18 fencers were put into three groups of six athletes, were each fencer would have five individual matches. The top 16 athletes overall would qualify for next round.

Rank	Name	Nation	Victories	TG	TR	Dif.	Notes
1	Maia Chamberlain	United States	5	25	8	+17	Q
2	Tamar Gordon	Canada	5	25	12	+13	Q
3	Magda Skarbonkiewicz	United States	4	23	8	+15	Q
4	Julieta Toledo	Mexico	3	20	12	+8	Q
5	Yolanda Muñoz	Chile	3	22	18	+4	Q
6	Pamela Brind'Amour	Canada	3	23	20	+3	Q
7	Pietra Chierighini	Brazil	3	18	16	+2	Q
8	Jessica Morales	Colombia	3	20	22	-2	Q
9	Natalia Botello	Mexico	3	18	21	-3	Q
10	Leidis Veranes	Cuba	2	20	20	0	Q
11	Candela Espinosa	Argentina	2	15	17	-2	Q
12	Eileen Grench	Panama	2	16	22	-6	Q
13	Karina Trois	Brazil	2	14	20	-6	Q
14	Florencia Cabezas	Chile	2	16	23	-7	Q
15	Katherine Paredes	Venezuela	1	17	23	-6	Q
16	María Alicia Perroni	Argentina	1	17	24	-7	Q
17	María Angélica Blanco	Colombia	1	12	24	-12	
18	Luismar Banezca	Venezuela	0	14	25	-11	

=== Elimination round ===
The results were as follows:

Round of 16
1	Maia Chamberlain (USA)	15
16	María Alicia Perroni (ARG)	8
9	Natalia Botello (MEX)	15
8	Jessica Morales (COL)	13
5	Yolanda Muñoz (CHI)	15
12	Eileen Grench (PAN)	10
15	Karina Trois (BRA)	5
4	Julieta Toledo (MEX)	15
3	Magda Skarbonkiewicz (USA)	15
14	Florencia Cabezas (CHI)	7
11	Candela Espinosa (ARG)	12
6	Pamela Brind'Amour (CAN)	15
7	Pietra Chierighini (BRA)	10
10	Leidis Veranes (CUB)	15
15	Katherine Paredes (VEN)	6
2	Tamar Gordon (CAN)	15

Quarterfinals
1	Maia Cahmberlain (USA)	15
9	Natalia Botello (MEX)	8
5	Yolanda Muñoz (CHI)	14
4	Julieta Toledo (MEX)	15
3	Magda Skarbonkiewicz (USA)	15
6	Pamela Brind'Amour (CAN)	6
10	Leidis Veranes (CUB)	15
2	Tamar Gordon (CAN)	11

Semifinals
1	Maia Chamberlain (USA)	15
4	Julieta Toledo (MEX)	7
3	Magda Skarbonkiewicz (USA)	15
10	Leidis Veranes (CUB)	14

Final
1	Maia Chamberlain (USA)	12
3	Magda Skarbonkiewicz (USA)	15
