= Fencing at the 2018 Summer Youth Olympics – Girls' sabre =

Girls' sabre at the III Summer Youth Olympic Games
- Venue: Africa Pavilion
- Dates: 9 October
- Competitors: 11 from 11 nations

Medalists
1st place, gold medalist(s)		Liza Pusztai	Hungary
2nd place, silver medalist(s)		Natalia Botello	Mexico
3rd place, bronze medalist(s)		Lee Ju-eun	South Korea

The girls' sabre competition (officially the women's sabre individual) at the 2018 Summer Youth Olympics took place on 9 October 2018 at the Africa Pavilion in Buenos Aires, Argentina. Eleven fencers from eleven nations took part. Liza Pusztai of Hungary won the gold medal, Mexico's Natalia Botello took silver and Lee Ju-eun of South Korea won bronze.

== Competition format ==
The competition began with a pool round, in which the 11 fencers were divided into two pools and fenced all other opponents within their pool. The results of the pool round were used to establish the seeding for the direct-elimination phase. The knockout round determined the medalists, with a separate bronze-medal bout between the losing semifinalists.

== Results ==
=== Pool round ===
The 11 competitors were split into two pools. Rankings within each pool were based on number of victories, the ratio of victories to bouts fenced and the hit difference.

==== Pool 1 ====
Rank	Athlete	(Turkey)	(Bulgaria)	(United States)	(China)	(Hungary)	V#	B#	Ind.	HG	HR	Diff.
5	Nisanur Erbil (TUR)		2	1	4	4	0	4	0.000	11	20	−9
1	Yoana Ilieva (BUL)	V		2	V	V	3	4	0.750	17	12	+5
4	Alexis Anglade (USA)	V	V		4	1	2	4	0.500	15	13	+2
2	Lin Kesi (CHN)	V	2	V		V	3	4	0.750	17	17	0
3	Liza Pusztai (HUN)	V	3	V	4		2	4	0.500	17	15	+2

==== Pool 2 ====
Rank	Athlete	(Belgium)	(South Korea)	(Mexico)	(Algeria)	(Russia)	(Hong Kong)	V#	B#	Ind.	HG	HR	Diff.
3	Jolien Corteyn (BEL)		3	3	V	V	V	3	5	0.600	21	17	+4
2	Lee Ju-eun (KOR)	V		4	V	V	V	4	5	0.800	24	13	+11
1	Natalia Botello (MEX)	V	V		V	V	V	5	5	1.000	25	11	+14
6	Chaima Benadouda (ALG)	2	2	1		2	2	0	5	0.000	9	25	−16
4	Alina Kliuchnikova (RUS)	2	2	0	V		V	2	5	0.400	14	18	−4
5	Ma Ho Chee (HKG)	3	1	3	V	1		1	5	0.200	13	22	−9

=== Bracket ===
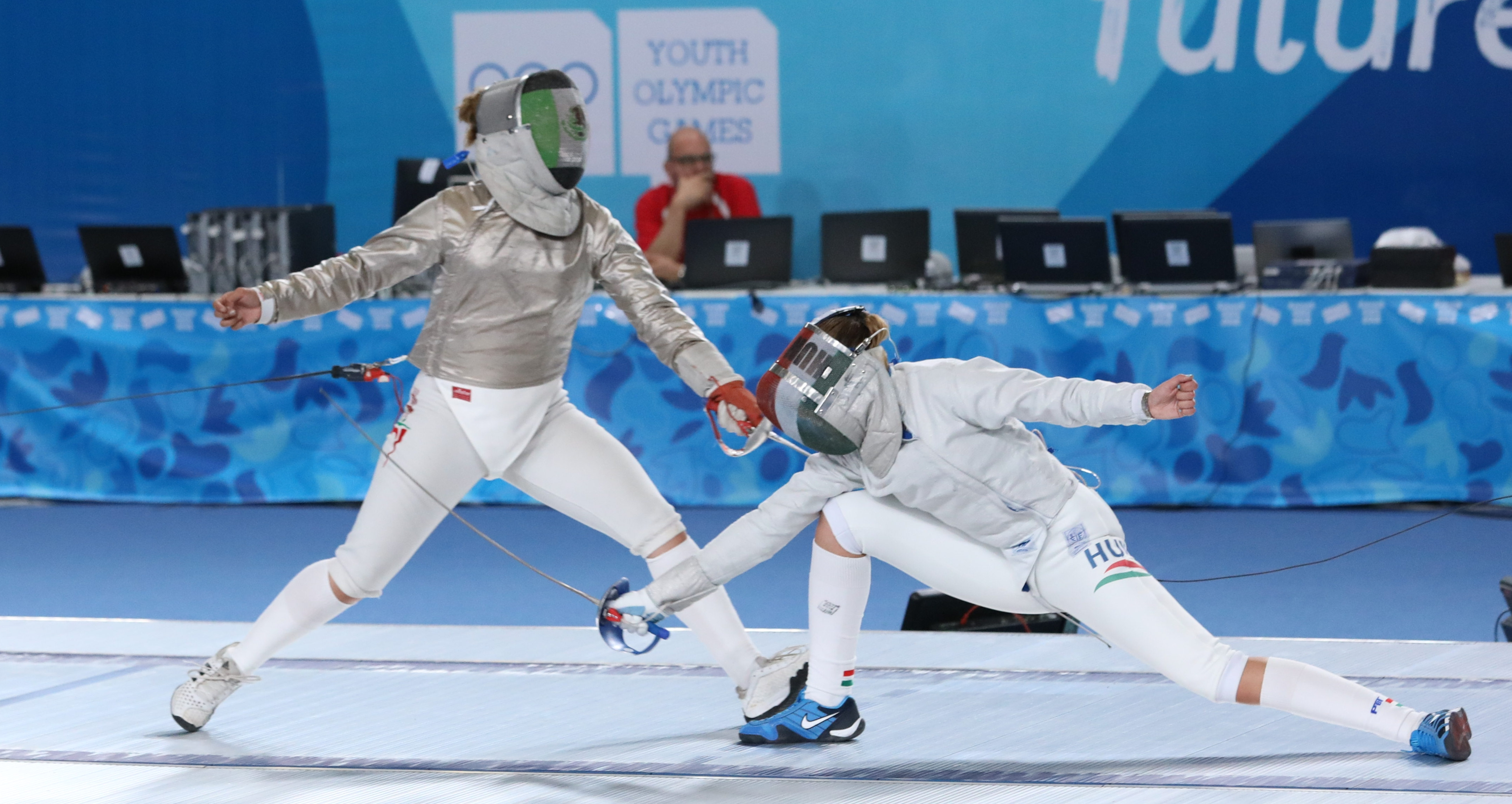
Final: Natalia Botello vs. Liza Pusztai

In the knockout phase, Liza Pusztai defeated Lee Ju-eun 15–12 in the semifinals, while Natalia Botello beat Jolien Corteyn 15–3. In the final Pusztai overcame Botello 15–9 to win the gold medal, and Lee claimed the bronze medal with a 15–8 victory over Corteyn.

Round of 16
1
16
9	Ma Ho Chee (HKG)	11
8	Alina Kliuchnikova (RUS)	15
5
12
13
4
3
14
11	Chaima Benadouda (ALG)	7
6	Liza Pusztai (HUN)	15
7	Alexis Anglade (USA)	15
10	Nisanur Erbil (TUR)	14
15
2

Quarterfinals
1	Natalia Botello (MEX)	15
8	Alina Kliuchnikova (RUS)	9
5	Jolien Corteyn (BEL)	15
4	Lin Kesi (CHN)	14
3	Yoana Ilieva (BUL)	13
6	Liza Pusztai (HUN)	15
7	Alexis Anglade (USA)	14
2	Lee Ju-eun (KOR)	15

Semifinals
1	Natalia Botello (MEX)	15
5	Jolien Corteyn (BEL)	3
6	Liza Pusztai (HUN)	15
2	Lee Ju-eun (KOR)	12

Final
1	Natalia Botello (MEX)	9
6	Liza Pusztai (HUN)	15
Third place
5	Jolien Corteyn (BEL)	8
2	Lee Ju-eun (KOR)	15

== Final standings ==
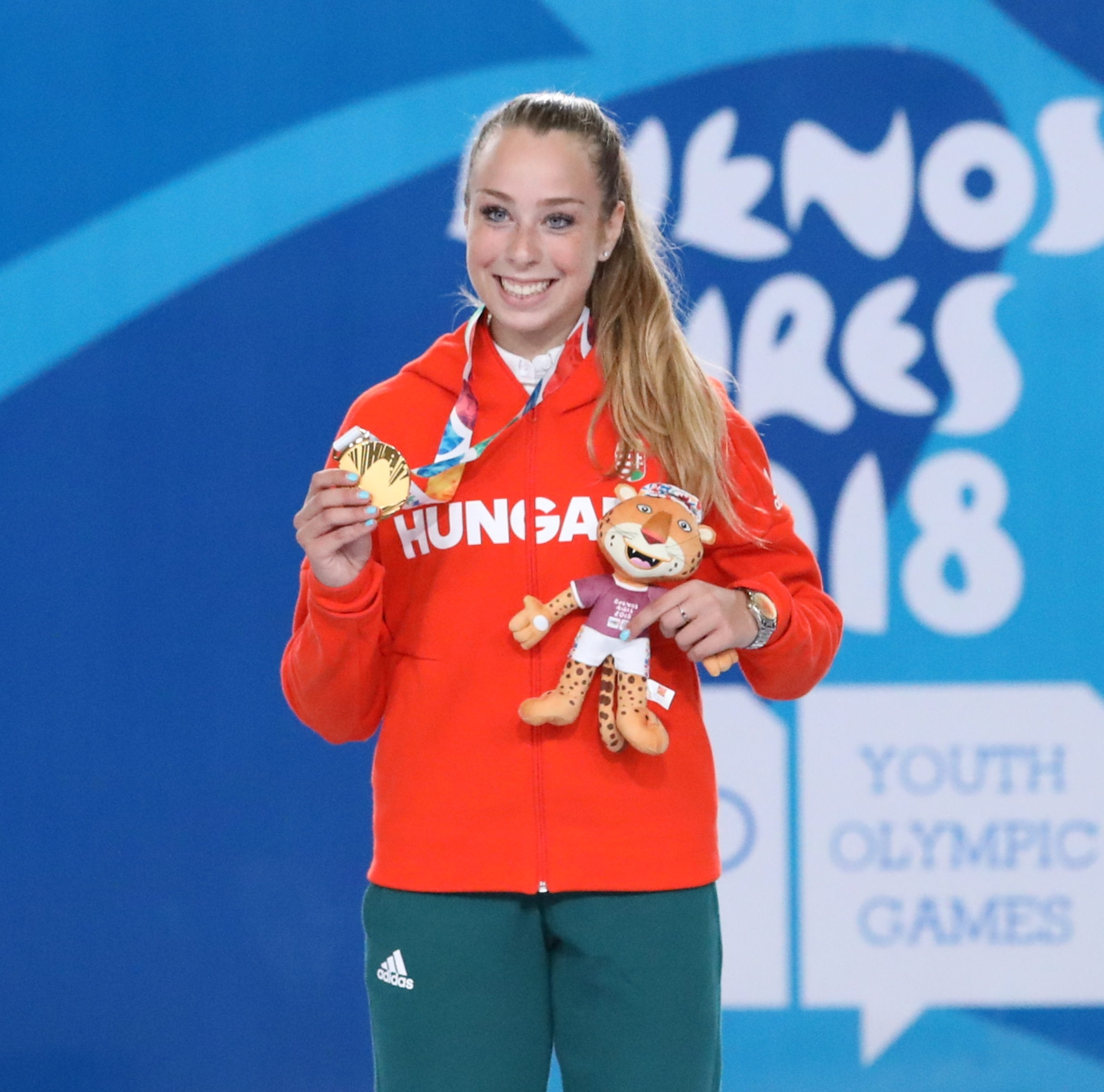
Liza Pusztai, gold medalist

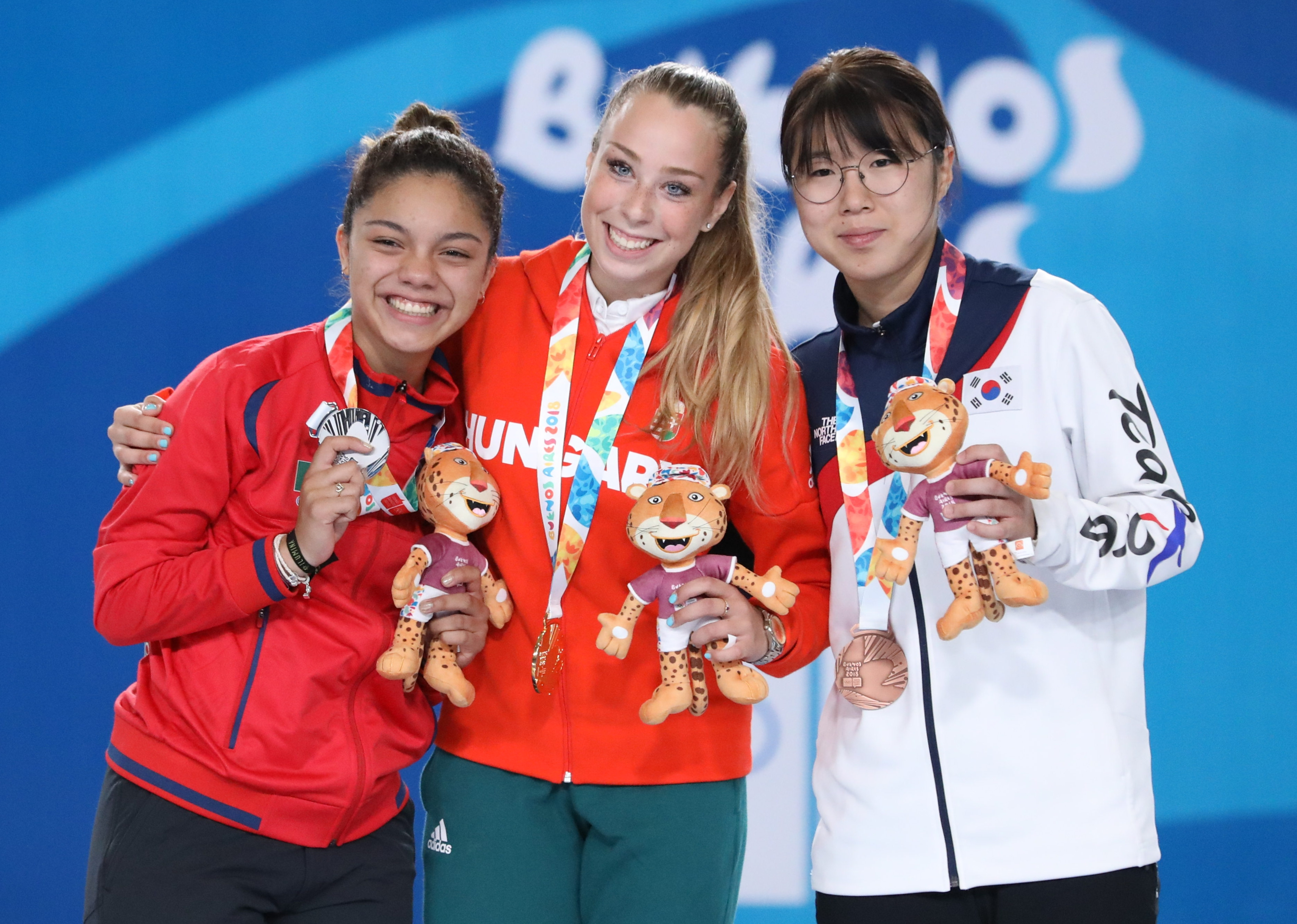
The medalists: Natalia Botello, Liza Pusztai and Lee Ju-eun

Rank	Athlete
1st place, gold medalist(s)	Liza Pusztai (HUN)
2nd place, silver medalist(s)	Natalia Botello (MEX)
3rd place, bronze medalist(s)	Lee Ju-eun (KOR)
4	Jolien Corteyn (BEL)
5	Yoana Ilieva (BUL)
6	Lin Kesi (CHN)
7	Alexis Anglade (USA)
8	Alina Kliuchnikova (RUS)
9	Ma Ho Chee (HKG)
10	Nisanur Erbil (TUR)
11	Chaima Benadouda (ALG)

== See also ==
- Fencing at the 2018 Summer Youth Olympics
- Fencing at the Summer Youth Olympics
