= Li Wanxuan =

Chinese fencer (born 2010)

Personal information
- Born: 23 July 2010 (age 16)

Fencing career
- Sport: Fencing
- Country: China
- Weapon: Sabre
- Hand: Right-handed
Medal record
Women's sabre
Representing China
Junior World Championships
Silver medal – second place	2026 Rio de Janeiro	Team

Li Wanxuan (born 23 July 2010) is a Chinese right-handed sabre fencer.

== Career ==
In April 2026, Li competed at the 2026 Junior Fencing World Championships and won a silver medal in the team event. In July 2026, she competed at the 2026 World Fencing Championships in the team sabre event and advanced to the finals.
