= Fencing at the 2018 Summer Youth Olympics – Mixed team =

Mixed team at the III Summer Youth Olympic Games
- Venue: Africa Pavilion
- Dates: 10 October
- Competitors: 48

Medalists
1st place, gold medalist(s)		Kateryna Chorniy; Martina Favaretto; Liza Pusztai; Davide Di Veroli; Armand Spichiger; Krisztián Rabb	Mixed-NOCs
2nd place, silver medalist(s)		Kaylin Hsieh; Yuka Ueno; Lee Ju-eun; Khasan Baudunov; Chen Yi-tung; Hyun Jun	Mixed-NOCs
3rd place, bronze medalist(s)		Emily Vermeule; May Tieu; Natalia Botello; Isaac Herbst; Kenji Bravo; Robert Vidovszky	Mixed-NOCs

The mixed team event at the 2018 Summer Youth Olympics was held at the Africa Pavilion in Argentina on 10 October.

== Seeding ==
Seed	Team	Athletes	Team points
1	Europe 1	Kateryna Chorniy (UKR) (1); Martina Favaretto (ITA) (2); Liza Pusztai (HUN) (1); Davide Di Veroli (ITA) (1); Armand Spichiger (FRA) (1); Krisztián Rabb (HUN) (1)	7
2	Asia-Oceania 1	Kaylin Hsieh (HKG) (2); Yuka Ueno (JPN) (1); Lee Ju-eun (KOR) (3); Khasan Baudunov (KGZ) (3); Chen Yi-tung (TPE) (6); Hyun Jun (KOR) (2)	17
3	Americas 1	Emily Vermeule (USA) (5); May Tieu (USA) (3); Natalia Botello (MEX) (2); Isaac Herbst (USA) (8); Kenji Bravo (USA) (2); Robert Vidovszky (USA) (4)	24
4	Europe 2	Veronika Bieleszová (CZE) (3); Rebeca Cândescu (ROU) (9); Jolien Corteyn (BEL) (4); Paul Veltrup (GER) (2); Jonas Winterberg-Poulsen (DEN) (3); Samuel Jarry (FRA) (5)	26
5	Europe 3	Axelle Wasiak (BEL) (4); Venissia Thépaut (FRA) (10); Yoana Ilieva (BUL) (5); Alexander Biro (AUT) (5); Maciej Bem (POL) (4); Alonso Santamaría (ESP) (6)	34
6	Americas 2	Ariane Leonard (CAN) (6); Anabella Acurero (VEN) (4); Alexis Anglade (USA) (7); Seraphim Jarov (CAN) (9); Diego Cervantes (MEX) (5); Hudson Santana (PUR) (10)	41
7	Asia-Oceania 2	Lim Tae-hee (KOR) (8); Fu Yingying (CHN) (6); Ma Ho Chee (HKG) (9); Seiya Asami (JPN) (6); Chan Pak Hei (HKG) (8); Hibiki Kato (JPN) (8)	45
8	Africa	Yousra Zeboudj (ALG) (10); Noha Hany (EGY) (8); Chaima Benadouda (ALG) (11); Mohamed Elsayed (EGY) (4); Loaay Marouf (EGY) (13); Mazen Elaraby (EGY) (3)	49

== Results ==
Fifth place
4	Europe 2	22
7	Asia-Oceania 2	30
Seventh place
8	Africa	15
6	Americas 2	30

5–8th place semifinals
8	Africa	13
4	Europe 2	30
6	Americas 2	29
7	Asia-Oceania 2	30

Quarterfinals
1	Europe 1	30
8	Africa	18
5	Europe 3	30
4	Europe 2	24
3	Americas 1	30
6	Americas 2	15
7	Asia-Oceania 2	23
2	Asia-Oceania 1	30

Semifinals
1	Europe 1	30
5	Europe 3	22
3	Americas 1	22
2	Asia-Oceania 1	23

Final
1	Europe 1	28
2	Asia-Oceania 1	25
Third place
5	Europe 3	24
3	Americas 1	30

== Final classification ==
Rank	Team
1st place, gold medalist(s)	Europe 1
2nd place, silver medalist(s)	Asia-Oceania 1
3rd place, bronze medalist(s)	Americas 1
4	Europe 3
5	Asia-Oceania 2
6	Europe 2
7	Americas 2
8	Africa
