= Nicholas Zhang =

Canadian fencer (born 2006)

Personal information
- Nationality: Canada
- Born: June 20, 2006 (age 20) Richmond, British Columbia

Sport
- Sport: Fencing
Medal record
Men's fencing
Representing Canada
Pan American Games
Silver medal – second place	2023 Santiago	Team épée
Pan American Fencing Championships
Silver medal – second place	2023 Lima	Epée
Bronze medal – third place	2025 Rio de Janeiro	Team
Junior World Championships
Silver medal – second place	2025 Wuxi	Team

Nicholas Zhang (born June 20, 2006) is a Canadian fencer in the épée discipline. Zhang has won silver medals at the Pan American level.

== Career ==
At the 2023 Pan American Fencing Championships in Lima, Peru, Zhang won the silver medal in the individual épée event. Later in the year, Zhang was named to Canada's 2023 Pan American Games team. At the games, Zhang would go on to win the silver medal in the men's team épée event, losing to the United States by one point.

Zhang would qualify for the 2024 Summer Olympics after winning the Pan American Zonal Qualification tournament held in San Jose, Costa Rica. Zhang competes for Harvard.
