= Youssef Shamel =

Egyptian fencer (born 2006)

Personal information
- Born: 2 February 2006 (age 20)

Fencing career
- Sport: Fencing
- Country: Egypt
- Weapon: Épée
- Hand: Right-handed
Medal record
Men's épée
Representing Egypt
World Championships
Bronze medal – third place	2026 Hong Kong	Team
Junior World Championships
Gold medal – first place	2023 Plovdiv	Team
Gold medal – first place	2026 Rio de Janeiro	Individual
Mediterranean Games
Silver medal – second place	2026 Taranto	Individual

Youssef Shamel (يوسف شامل, born 2 February 2006) is an Egyptian right-handed épée fencer.

== Career ==
In March 2026, Shamel competed at the 2026 NCAA fencing championships and won the national championship in the individual épée event. This was the first time that North Carolina won an individual national championship since John Friedberg in 1983. The next month he competed at the 2026 Junior and Cadet Fencing World Championships and won a gold medal in the individual épée event.

In July 2026, he competed at the 2026 World Fencing Championships and won a bronze medal in the team épée event. The next month he competed at the 2026 Mediterranean Games and won a silver medal in the individual épée event, losing to compatriot Mohamed El-Sayed in the final.
