= Julieta Toledo =

Mexican fencer (born 1997)

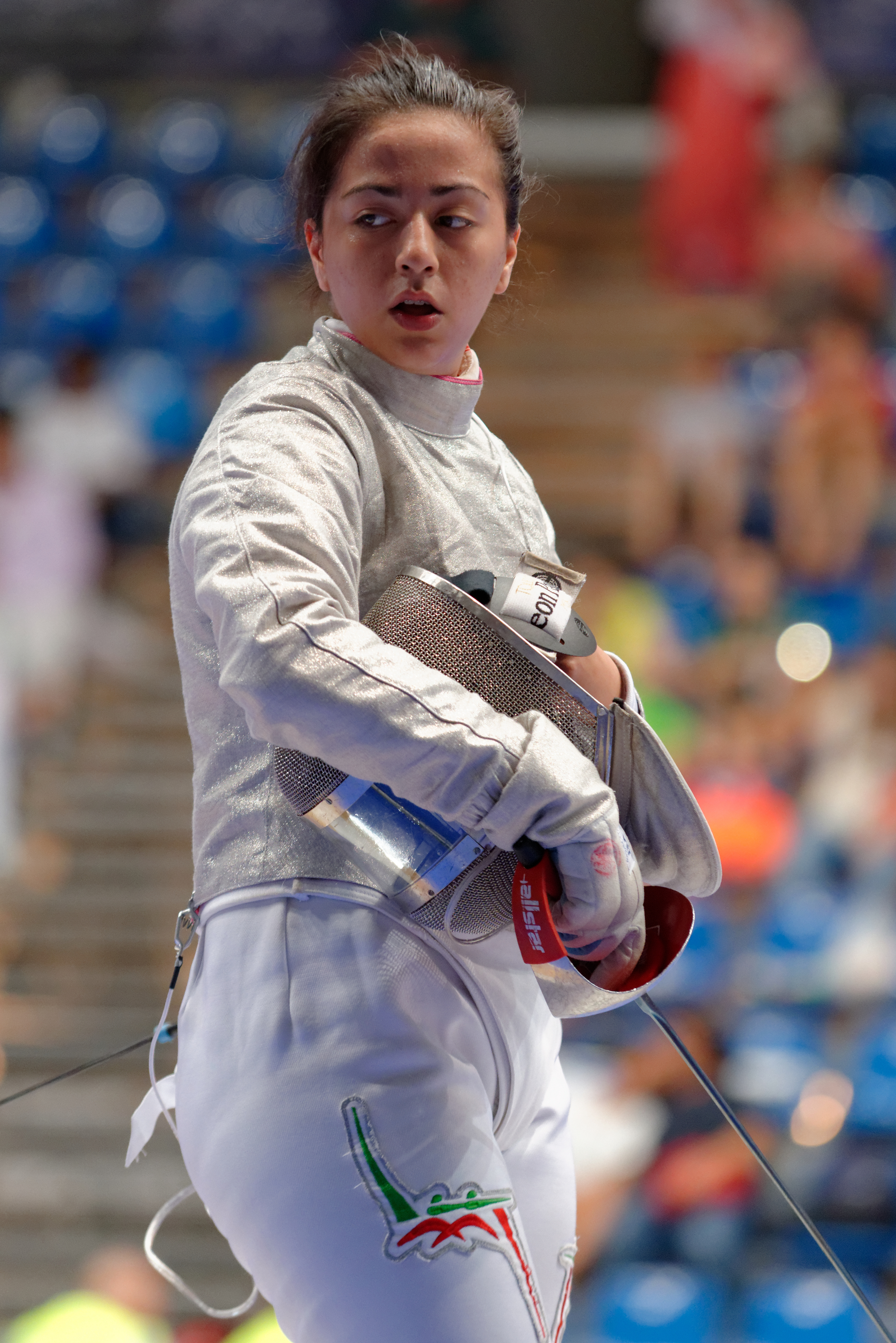

Personal information
- Born: 24 May 1997 (age 29)
- Home town: Mexico City, Mexico
- Height: 1.66 m (5 ft 5 in)
- Weight: 66 kg (146 lb)

Fencing career
- Sport: Fencing
- Country: Mexico
- Weapon: sabre
- Hand: right-handed
- FIE ranking: current ranking
Medal record
Women's fencing
Representing Mexico
Pan American Games
Bronze medal – third place	2023 Santiago	Sabre
Bronze medal – third place	2023 Santiago	Team sabre

Julieta Toledo (born 24 May 1997) is a Mexican sabre fencer.
