= 2025 Junior and Cadet Fencing World Championships =

International fencing competition in China

- Dates: 7–15 April 2025
- Host city: Wuxi, China
- Venue: Wuxi Taihu International Expo Center
- Events: 18

The 2025 Junior and Cadet Fencing World Championships took place from 7 to 15 April 2025 in Wuxi, China.

== Medal summary ==
=== Junior ===
==== Men ====
Event	Gold	Silver	Bronze
Individual épée	Mahmoud Elsayed; Egypt	Matteo Galassi; Italy	Maksym Perchuk; Ukraine
Individual épée	Mahmoud Elsayed; Egypt	Matteo Galassi; Italy	Nikita Gorin; Individual Neutral Athletes
Team épée	Italy; Matteo Galassi; Marco Francesco Locatelli; Fabio Mastromarino; Cristiano Sena	Canada; William Doyon-Verdon; Daniel Rubin; Junzhe Shan; Nicholas Zhang	Hong Kong; Gao Ying Chuen; Hsu Jia Huan Kenton; Wong Chi Ho; Yuen Nok Man
Individual foil	Abdelrahman Tolba; Egypt	Aleksandr Kerik; Individual Neutral Athletes	Yahor Rabtsau; Individual Neutral Athletes
Individual foil	Abdelrahman Tolba; Egypt	Aleksandr Kerik; Individual Neutral Athletes	Pavel Puzankov; Individual Neutral Athletes
Team foil	Italy; Mattia De Cristofaro; Matteo Iacomoni; Elia Pasin; Andrea Zanardo	Individual Neutral Athletes; Iskander Bulatov; Aleksandr Kerik; Valerii Kornilov; Pavel Puzankov	China; Chen Jianghe; Guo Yifan; Liu Zihao; Lyu Weiqiao
Individual sabre	Cosimo Bertini; Italy	Vlad Covaliu; Romania	Tom Couderc; France
Individual sabre	Cosimo Bertini; Italy	Vlad Covaliu; Romania	Benedykt Denkiewicz; Poland
Team sabre	United States; Colin Heathcock; Cody Walter Ji; William Morrill; Emilio Paturzo Gonzalez	Italy; Cosimo Bertini; Leonardo Reale; Edoardo Reale; Valerio Reale	Uzbekistan; Islambek Abdazov; Sardor Abdukarimbekov; Musa Aymuratov; Zuhriddin Kodirov

==== Women ====
Event	Gold	Silver	Bronze
Individual épée	Julia Yin; Canada	Blanka Nagy; Hungary	Rin Kishimoto; Japan
Individual épée	Julia Yin; Canada	Blanka Nagy; Hungary	Oliwia Tercjak; Poland
Team épée	Ukraine; Valeria Bilous-Gridzhak; Emily Conrad; Alina Dmytruk; Anna Maksymenko	China; Jiang Huishuang; Li Xinyao; Ni Qiyao; Xie Yuchen	United States; Sophia Jakel; Yasmine Khamis; Sumin Lee; Leehi Machulsky
Individual foil	Jaelyn Liu; United States	Matilde Molinari; Italy	Polina Volobueva; Individual Neutral Athletes
Individual foil	Jaelyn Liu; United States	Matilde Molinari; Italy	Jessica Guo; Canada
Team foil	United States; Kong Chin-Yi; Jaelyn Liu; Katerina Lung; Victoria Pevzner	Italy; Ludovica Franzoni; Letizia Gabola; Matilde Molinari; Vittoria Pinna	Japan; Ayano Iimura; Rino Nagase; Misaki Numata; Yukari Takamizawa
Individual sabre	Aleksandra Mikhailova; Individual Neutral Athletes	Alexandra Lee; United States	Pan Qimiao; China
Individual sabre	Aleksandra Mikhailova; Individual Neutral Athletes	Alexandra Lee; United States	Magda Skarbonkiewicz; United States
Team sabre	United States; Alexandra Lee; Sophie Liu; Magda Skarbonkiewicz; Siobhan Sullivan	France; Roxane Chabrol; Eléa Faur; Alejandra Manga; Rita Robineaux	Uzbekistan; Luisa Herrera; Ayakoz Jumamuratova; Gulistan Perdibaeva; Samira Shokirova

=== Cadet ===
==== Men ====
Event	Gold	Silver	Bronze
Individual épée	Nathaniel Wimmer; United States	Elisei Pisarev; Individual Neutral Athletes	Nicolò Sonnessa; Italy
Individual épée	Nathaniel Wimmer; United States	Elisei Pisarev; Individual Neutral Athletes	Junzhe Shan; Canada
Individual foil	Luao Yang; United States	Ryoga Ono; Japan	Aiden Siu; United States
Individual foil	Luao Yang; United States	Ryoga Ono; Japan	Marco Panazzolo; Italy
Individual sabre	Emilio Paturzo Gonzalez; United States	Candeniz Berrak; Turkey	Iaroslav Borisov; Individual Neutral Athletes
Individual sabre	Emilio Paturzo Gonzalez; United States	Candeniz Berrak; Turkey	Leonardo Reale; Italy

==== Women ====
Event	Gold	Silver	Bronze
Individual épée	Lotti Horváth; Hungary	Alina Dmytruk; Ukraine	Haidi Wu; Hong Kong
Individual épée	Lotti Horváth; Hungary	Alina Dmytruk; Ukraine	Alexandra Kravets; Israel
Individual foil	Jaelyn Liu; United States	Jo Ju-hyun; South Korea	Zhuang Xinyi; China
Individual foil	Jaelyn Liu; United States	Jo Ju-hyun; South Korea	Tie Zhihe; China
Individual sabre	Amalia Covaliu; Romania	Pan Qimiao; China	Xuanyi Zhang; United States
Individual sabre	Amalia Covaliu; Romania	Pan Qimiao; China	Jang Eun-chae; South Korea

== Medal table ==
* Host nation (China)

Rank	Nation	Gold	Silver	Bronze	Total
1	United States	8	1	4	13
2	Italy	3	4	3	10
3	Egypt	2	0	0	2
–	Individual Neutral Athletes	1	3	5	9
4	Canada	1	1	2	4
5	Ukraine	1	1	1	3
6	Hungary	1	1	0	2
6	Romania	1	1	0	2
8	China*	0	2	4	6
9	Japan	0	1	2	3
10	France	0	1	1	2
10	South Korea	0	1	1	2
12	Turkey	0	1	0	1
13	Hong Kong	0	0	2	2
13	Poland	0	0	2	2
13	Uzbekistan	0	0	2	2
16	Israel	0	0	1	1
Totals (16 entries)		18	18	30	66
