= Guinea at the 2026 Summer Youth Olympics =

- Flag of Guinea
- IOC code: GUI
- NOC: Comité National Olympique et Sportif Guinéen

in Dakar, Senegal October 31, 2026 – November 13, 2026
- Competitors: 10 in 7 sports
- Flag bearers: Fatoumata Koulako Bah & Mohamed Fofana
- Medals: Gold 0 Silver 0 Bronze 0 Total 0

Summer Youth Olympics appearances
- 2010; 2014; 2018; 2026

Guinea is scheduled to compete at the 2026 Summer Youth Olympics in Dakar, Senegal from October 31 to November 13, 2026. This will mark Guinea's fourth appearance at the Youth Olympics, after making its debut in 2010.

Archer Fatoumata Koulako Bah and swimmer Mohamed Fofana served as the flag bearers for the opening ceremony.

== Competitors ==
The following is the list of number of competitors participating at the Games per sport/discipline.

Sport	Men	Women	Total
Archery	1	1	2
Athletics	0	1	1
Beach wrestling	0	1	1
Fencing	0	1	1
Judo	0	1	1
Swimming	1	2	3
Taekwondo	1	0	1
Total	3	7	10

== Archery ==
Guinea entered two archers, one of each gender.

Athlete	Event	Ranking Round		Round of 16	Quarterfinals	Semifinals	Final / BM	Rank
Athlete	Event	Score	Seed	Opposition Score	Opposition Score	Opposition Score	Opposition Score	Rank
Mory Konaté	Men's individual							
Fatoumata Koulako Bah	Women's individual							
Mory Konaté; Fatoumata Koulako Bah	Mixed team							

== Athletics ==
Guinea entered one female athlete.

=== Track & road events ===
Women

Athlete	Event	Semifinal		Final	
Athlete	Event	Result	Rank	Result	Rank
Mamaissata Camara	200 m				

== Beach wrestling ==
Guinea entered one female athlete.

Women

Team	Event	Group stage				Semifinals	Final / BM	
Team	Event	Opposition Result	Opposition Result	Opposition Result	Rank	Opposition Result	Opposition Result	Rank
Mariama Kaba	–55 kg							

== Fencing ==
Guinea entered one female athlete.

Athlete	Event	Round of 64	Round of 32	Round of 16	Quarterfinal	Semifinal	Final / BM	
Athlete	Event	Opposition Score	Opposition Score	Opposition Score	Opposition Score	Opposition Score	Opposition Score	Rank
Fatoumata Camara	Women's sabre							

== Judo ==
Guinea entered one female judoka based on the available quotas assigned by the International Judo Federation.

Women

Athlete	Event	Round of 16	Quarterfinals	Semifinals	Repechage 1	Repechage 2	Final	
Athlete	Event	Opposition Result	Opposition Result	Opposition Result	Opposition Result	Opposition Result	Opposition Result	Rank
Mamaissata Camara	–63 kg							

== Swimming ==
Guinea entered three swimmers, one male and two female.

Athlete	Event	Heat		Final	
Athlete	Event	Time	Rank	Time	Rank
Mohamed Fofana	50 m breaststroke				
Mohamed Fofana	100 m breaststroke				
Fatoumata Diaraye Bah	50 m freestyle				
Fatoumata Diaraye Bah	50 m backstroke				
Fatoumata Diaraye Bah	50 m butterfly				
Marie Camara	50 m breaststroke				
Marie Camara	100 m breaststroke				

== Taekwondo ==
Guinea entered one male athlete.

Men

Athlete	Event	Round of 16	Quarterfinals	Semifinals	Repechage	Final / BM	
Athlete	Event	Opposition Result	Opposition Result	Opposition Result	Opposition Result	Opposition Result	Rank
Abdourahmane Diallo	-55 kg	Bye					
