= Zhang Xinyi (fencer) =

Chinese fencer (born 2001)

Personal information
- Born: 12 June 2001 (age 25)

Fencing career
- Sport: Fencing
- Country: China
- Weapon: Sabre
- Hand: Right-handed
Medal record
Women's sabre
Representing China
World Championships
Silver medal – second place	2026 Hong Kong	Team
Asian Games
Bronze medal – third place	2022 Hangzhou	Team
Bronze medal – third place	2026 Aichi–Nagoya	Team
Asian Championships
Gold medal – first place	2024 Kuwait City	Team
Silver medal – second place	2023 Wuxi	Team

Zhang Xinyi (Chinese: 张心怡; born 12 June 2001) is a Chinese right-handed sabre fencer.

== Career ==
Zhang competed at the 2023 Asian Fencing Championships and won a silver medal in the team sabre event. She again competed at the 2024 Asian Fencing Championships and won a gold medal in the team sabre event.

In July 2026, she competed at the 2026 World Fencing Championships and advanced to the main draw in the individual sabre event. She also competed in the team sabre event and won a silver medal.
