= Fencing at the 2023 Pan American Games – Men's team épée =

Men's team epée at the 2023 Pan American Games
- Venue: Paralympic Training Center
- Dates: November 2
- Competitors: 18 from 10 nations

Medalists
Gold medal	Curtis McDowald; Samuel Imrek; Samuel Larsen	United States
Silver medal	Nicholas Zhang; Fynn Fafard; Dylan French	Canada
Bronze medal	Jesús Lugones; Alessandro Taccani; Agustín Gusman	Argentina

The men's team epée competition of the fencing events at the 2023 Pan American Games was held on November 2 at the Paralympic Training Center.

== Format ==
The team épée competition consisted of a three-round single-elimination bracket with a bronze medal match between the two semifinal losers and classification semifinals and finals for 5th to 8th places. Teams consist of three members each. Matches consist of nine bouts, with every fencer on one team facing each fencer on the other team. Scoring carried over between bouts with a total of 45 touches being the team goal. Bouts lasted until one team reached the target multiple of 5 touches. For example, if the first bout ended with a score of 5–3, that score would remain into the next bout and the second bout would last until one team reached 10 touches. Bouts also had a maximum time of three minutes each; if the final bout ended before either team reached 45 touches, the team leading at that point won. A tie at that point would result in an additional one-minute sudden-death time period. This sudden-death period was further modified by the selection of a draw-winner beforehand; if neither fencer scored a touch during the minute, the predetermined draw-winner won the bout.

== Schedule ==
Date	Time	Round
November 2, 2023	09:30	Quarterfinals
November 2, 2023	11:45	Semifinals
November 2, 2023	11:45	Fifth - Eight Place
November 2, 2023	13:40	Seventh - Eight Place
November 2, 2023	13:40	Fifth - Sixth Place
November 2, 2023	15:00	Finals

== Results ==
The results were as follows:

Quarterfinals
Venezuela	33
Chile	23
United States	45
Colombia	41
Argentina	32
Brazil	27
Cuba	41
Canada	45

Semifinals
Venezuela	41
United States	45
Argentina	30
Canada	45

Final
United States	42
Canada	41
Third place
Venezuela	42
Argentina	43

=== Classification 5 – 8 ===
Classification
Chile	43
Colombia	34
Brazil	45
Cuba	44

Fifth place
Brazil	45
Chile	28
Seventh place
Colombia	45
Cuba	28

== Final classification ==
Rank	Team	Athlete
1st place, gold medalist(s)	United States	Curtis McDowald; Samuel Imrek; Samuel Larsen
2nd place, silver medalist(s)	Canada	Nicholas Zhang; Fynn Fafard; Dylan French
3rd place, bronze medalist(s)	Argentina	Jesús Lugones; Alessandro Taccani; Agustín Gusman
4	Venezuela	Rubén Limardo; Francisco Limardo; Grabiel Lugo; Janderson Briceño
5	Brazil	Alexandre Camargo; Fabrizio Lazzarotto; Leopoldo Gubert
6	Chile	Joaquín Bustos; Pablo Nuñéz; Gustavo Alarcón; Rolf Nickel
7	Colombia	Juan Castillo; Jhon Édison Rodríguez; Hernando Roa
8	Cuba	Dariel Carrión; Yordan Ferrer; Ringo Quintero
