= Fencing at the 2023 Pan American Games – Women's team sabre =

Women's team sabre at the 2023 Pan American Games
- Venue: Paralympic Training Center
- Dates: November 3
- Competitors: 26 from 8 nations

Medalists
Gold medal	Maia Chamberlain; Magda Skarbonkiewicz; Alexis Anglade	United States
Silver medal	Pamela Brind'Amour; Marissa Ponich; Tamar Gordon	Canada
Bronze medal	Natalia Botello; Diana Gonzalez; Julieta Toledo	Mexico

The women's team sabre competition of the fencing events at the 2023 Pan American Games was held on November 3 at the Paralympic Training Center.

== Format ==
The team sabre competition consisted of a three-round single-elimination bracket with a bronze medal match between the two semifinal losers and classification semifinals and finals for 5th to 8th places. Teams consist of three members each. Matches consist of nine bouts, with every fencer on one team facing each fencer on the other team. Scoring carried over between bouts with a total of 45 touches being the team goal. Bouts lasted until one team reached the target multiple of 5 touches. For example, if the first bout ended with a score of 5–3, that score would remain into the next bout and the second bout would last until one team reached 10 touches. Bouts also had a maximum time of three minutes each; if the final bout ended before either team reached 45 touches, the team leading at that point won. A tie at that point would result in an additional one-minute sudden-death time period. This sudden-death period was further modified by the selection of a draw-winner beforehand; if neither fencer scored a touch during the minute, the predetermined draw-winner won the bout.

== Schedule ==
Date	Time	Round
November 3, 2023	12:00	Quarterfinals
November 3, 2023	13:40	Semifinals
November 3, 2023	13:40	Fifth - Eight Place
November 3, 2023	14:20	Seventh - Eight Place
November 3, 2023	14:20	Fifth - Sixth Place
November 3, 2023	16:50	Finals

== Results ==
The results were as follows:

Quarterfinals
United States	45
Chile	11
Brazil	39
Argentina	45
Mexico	45
Venezuela	30
Colombia	26
Canada	45

Semifinals
United States	45
Argentina	13
Mexico	39
Canada	45

Final
United States	45
Canada	29
Third place
Argentina	39
Mexico	45

=== Classification 5 – 8 ===
Classification
Brazil	45
Chile	29
Venezuela	45
Colombia	41

Fifth place
Venezuela	33
Brazil	45
Seventh place
Chile	24
Colombia	45

== Final classification ==
Rank	Team	Athlete
1st place, gold medalist(s)	United States	Maia Chamberlain; Magda Skarbonkiewicz; Alexis Anglade
2nd place, silver medalist(s)	Canada	Pamela Brind'Amour; Marissa Ponich; Tamar Gordon
3rd place, bronze medalist(s)	Mexico	Natalia Botello; Diana Gonzalez; Julieta Toledo
4	Argentina	Candela Espinosa; María Perroni; María Moran
5	Brazil	Karina Trois; Luana Pekelman; Pietra Chierighini
6	Venezuela	Crelia Ramos; Luismar Banezca; Katherine Paredes
7	Colombia	María Blanco; Jessica Morales; Valentina Beltrán
8	Chile	Elizabeth Mayor; Florencia Cabezas; Yolanda Muñoz
