= Women's team sabre at the 2023 World Fencing Championships =

- Venue: Milan Convention Center
- Location: Milan, Italy
- Dates: 29–30 July
- Competitors: 114 from 29 nations
- Teams: 29

Medalists
gold medal	Sugár Katinka Battai; Anna Márton; Liza Pusztai; Luca Szűcs	Hungary
silver medal	Manon Brunet; Sara Balzer; Caroline Queroli; Margaux Rifkiss	France
bronze medal	Choi Se-bin; Jeon Eun-hye; Jeon Ha-young; Yoon Ji-su	South Korea

The Women's team sabre competition at the 2023 World Fencing Championships was held on 29 and 30 July 2023.

== Draw ==
=== Finals ===
Semifinals
France	45
Ukraine	32
Hungary	45
South Korea	39

Final
France	38
Hungary	45
Third place
Ukraine	32
South Korea	45

=== Top half ===
==== Section 1 ====
Round of 32
Algeria	45
Kazakhstan	43
Bulgaria	45
Singapore	27
Great Britain	22
Japan	45

Round of 16
France	45
Algeria	22
Bulgaria	43
Japan	45

Quarterfinals
France	45
Japan	37

==== Section 2 ====
Round of 32
United States	45
India	23
Romania	33
China	45
Ukraine	45
Uzbekistan	27
Colombia	17
Italy	45

Round of 16
United States	45
China	40
Ukraine	45
Italy	33

Quarterfinals
United States	44
Ukraine	45

=== Bottom half ===
==== Section 3 ====
Round of 32
Hong Kong	33
Poland	45
Greece	45
Brazil	19
Venezuela	17
Spain	45

Round of 16
Hungary	45
Poland	39
Greece	45
Spain	44

Quarterfinals
Hungary	45
Greece	35

==== Section 4 ====
Round of 32
Azerbaijan	45
Argentina	33
Mexico	27
Germany	45
Canada	37
Turkey	45

Round of 16
Azerbaijan	45
Germany	32
Turkey	21
South Korea	45

Quarterfinals
Azerbaijan	43
South Korea	45

=== Placement rounds ===
==== 5–8th place bracket ====
5–8th place semifinals
Japan	45
United States	42
Greece	42
Azerbaijan	45

Fifth place
Japan	44
Azerbaijan	45
Seventh place
United States	45
Greece	32

==== 9–16th place bracket ====
9–16th place quarterfinals
Algeria	32
Bulgaria	45
China	38
Italy	45
Poland	33
Spain	45
Germany	45
Turkey	39

9–12th place semifinals
Bulgaria	44
Italy	45
Spain	30
Germany	45

Ninth place
Italy	36
Germany	45
Eleventh place
Bulgaria	45
Spain	44

==== 13–16th place bracket ====
13–16th place semifinals
Algeria	45
China	43
Poland	45
Turkey	29

13th place
Algeria	32
Poland	45
15th place
China	45
Turkey	21

== Final ranking ==
Rank	Team
1st place, gold medalist(s)	Hungary
2nd place, silver medalist(s)	France
3rd place, bronze medalist(s)	South Korea
4	Ukraine
5	Azerbaijan
6	Japan
7	United States
8	Greece
9	Germany
10	Italy
11	Bulgaria
12	Spain
13	Poland
14	Algeria
15	China
16	Turkey
17	Canada
18	Kazakhstan
19	Hong Kong
20	Uzbekistan
21	Romania
22	Brazil
23	Mexico
24	Singapore
25	Great Britain
26	Argentina
27	Venezuela
28	India
29	Colombia
