= Beach wrestling at the 2026 Summer Youth Olympics – Women's 55 kg =

Girl's 55 kg at the IV Summer Youth Olympic Games
- Venue: Saly Beach West
- Date: 7 November 2026
- Competitors: 12 from 12 nations

Medalists
1st place, gold medalist(s)		Elisabeth Ebedo Diatta; Senegal
2nd place, silver medalist(s)		Reisa Kojima; Japan
3rd place, bronze medalist(s)		Stephie Ts imba Manzanza; Democratic Republic of the Congo

The Girl's 55 kg competition in beach wrestling at the 2026 Summer Youth Olympics was held on 7 November 2026 at Saly Beach West.

== Competition format ==
The competition was contested under the beach wrestling rules. Twelve wrestlers were divided into three groups of four athletes each. The wrestlers competed in a round-robin format within their respective groups. The group winners and the best second-placed wrestler advanced to the semifinals. The semifinal winners competed in the gold-medal match, while the semifinal losers contested the bronze-medal match.

== Schedule ==
All times are in local time (UTC−3).

Date	Time	Round
Saturday, 7 November 2026	10:30	Group stage
Saturday, 7 November 2026	15:00	Semifinals
Saturday, 7 November 2026	15:00	Medal matches

== Results ==
Legend

- F — Won by fall
- WO — Won by walkover

=== Notes ===
- LIGHT and DARK indicate the assigned colours of the wrestlers in each bout.
- Technical points represent the points scored by each wrestler during a match.
- Classification points are awarded according to the match result and are used to determine the group standings.
- Q – Qualified for the semifinals as the group winner.
- q – Qualified for the semifinals as the best second-placed wrestler across all groups.

==== Results codes ====
Code	Meaning
VSU	Victory with 3 points, without a 3-point takedown or throw, and without any points scored by the opponent.
VSU1	Victory with 3 points, without a 3-point takedown or throw, but with points scored by the opponent.
VFA	Victory by a 3-point takedown or throw, without any points scored by the opponent.
VFA1	Victory by a 3-point takedown or throw, with points scored by the opponent.
VFO	Victory by forfeit, when an athlete does not show up on the ring.
VPO	Victory with less than 3 points.

=== Group stage ===
==== Group A ====
Round	Match number	Colour	Athlete	NOC	Technical points	Classification points	Results code
1	7	LIGHT	Anastasija Jakovleva	Latvia	2	1	VSU1
1	7	DARK	Gunel Karimli	Azerbaijan	3	2	VSU1
1	8	LIGHT	Rana Lahssini	Morocco	2	2	VFO
1	8	DARK	Mariama Foula Kaba	Guinea	0	0	VFO
2	19	LIGHT	Anastasija Jakovleva	Latvia	3	2	VSU1
2	19	DARK	Rana Lahssini	Morocco	1	1	VSU1
2	20	LIGHT	Gunel Karimli	Azerbaijan	2	2	VFO
2	20	DARK	Mariama Foula Kaba	Guinea	0	0	VFO
3	55	LIGHT	Anastasija Jakovleva	Latvia	2	2	VFO
3	55	DARK	Mariama Foula Kaba	Guinea	0	0	VFO
3	56	LIGHT	Gunel Karimli	Azerbaijan	3	2	VSU
3	56	DARK	Rana Lahssini	Morocco	0	0	VSU

Rank	Athlete	NOC code	Matches won	Classification points	Technical points scored	Technical points conceded	Draw number	Qualification
1	Gunel Karimli	Azerbaijan	3	6	6	2	123	Q
2	Anastasija Jakovleva	Latvia	2	5	5	4	21	
3	Rana Lahssini	Morocco	1	3	1	6	130	
4	Mariama Foula Kaba	Guinea	0	0	0	0	255	

==== Group B ====
Round	Match number	Colour	Athlete	NOC code	Technical points	Classification points	Results code
1	9	LIGHT	Xiomara Meza	Ecuador	0	0	VSU
1	9	DARK	Elisabeth Ebedo Diatta	Senegal	3	2	VSU
1	10	LIGHT	Stephie Ts imba Manzanza	Democratic Republic of the Congo	3	2	VSU
1	10	DARK	Ikram Bali	Algeria	0	0	VSU
2	21	LIGHT	Xiomara Meza	Ecuador	0	0	VSU
2	21	DARK	Stephie Ts imba Manzanza	Democratic Republic of the Congo	3	2	VSU
2	22	LIGHT	Elisabeth Ebedo Diatta	Senegal	3	2	VSU
2	22	DARK	Ikram Bali	Algeria	0	0	VSU
3	57	LIGHT	Xiomara Meza	Ecuador	1	1	VPO
3	57	DARK	Ikram Bali	Algeria	0	0	VPO
3	58	LIGHT	Elisabeth Ebedo Diatta	Senegal	1	1	VFA1
3	58	DARK	Stephie Ts imba Manzanza	Democratic Republic of the Congo	5	4	VFA1

Rank	Athlete	NOC code	Matches won	Classification points	Technical points scored	Technical points conceded	Draw number	Qualification
1	Stephie Ts imba Manzanza	Democratic Republic of the Congo	3	8	11	1	169	Q
2	Elisabeth Ebedo Diatta	Senegal	2	5	7	5	122	q
3	Xiomara Meza	Ecuador	1	1	1	6	25	
4	Ikram Bali	Algeria	0	0	0	7	195	

==== Group C ====
Round	Match number	Colour	Athlete	NOC code	Technical points	Classification points	Results code
1	11	LIGHT	Reisa Kojima	Japan	3	2	VSU1
1	11	DARK	Madalina Margareta Pavel	Romania	1	1	VSU1
1	12	LIGHT	Kaydie Star	Nauru	0	0	VSU
1	12	DARK	Stacy Rodríguez	Peru	3	2	VSU
2	23	LIGHT	Reisa Kojima	Japan	3	2	VSU
2	23	DARK	Kaydie Star	Nauru	0	0	VSU
2	24	LIGHT	Madalina Margareta Pavel	Romania	1	1	VSU1
2	24	DARK	Stacy Rodríguez	Peru	3	2	VSU1
3	59	LIGHT	Reisa Kojima	Japan	3	2	VSU
3	59	DARK	Stacy Rodríguez	Peru	0	0	VSU
3	60	LIGHT	Madalina Margareta Pavel	Romania	3	2	VSU
3	60	DARK	Kaydie Star	Nauru	0	0	VSU

Rank	Athlete	NOC code	Matches won	Classification points	Technical points scored	Technical points conceded	Draw number	Qualification
1	Reisa Kojima	Japan	3	6	9	1	37	Q
2	Stacy Rodríguez	Peru	2	4	6	4	193	
3	Madalina Margareta Pavel	Romania	1	4	5	6	39	
4	Kaydie Star	Nauru	0	0	0	9	191	

=== Finals ===
The semifinals featured the three group winners and the best second-placed wrestler. Elisabeth Ebedo Diatta defeated Gunel Karimli, while Reisa Kojima defeated Stephie Ts imba Manzanza to advance to the gold-medal match. Diatta subsequently won the gold medal, defeating Kojima in the final. Ts imba Manzanza secured the bronze medal after defeating Karimli.

Semifinals
1	Elisabeth Ebedo Diatta (SEN)	3
4	Gunel Karimli (AZE)	0
3	Stephie Ts imba Manzanza (COD)	0
2	Reisa Kojima (JPN)	3

Final
Elisabeth Ebedo Diatta (SEN)	5
Reisa Kojima (JPN)	1

Bronze-medal match
Stephie Ts imba Manzanza (COD)	3
Gunel Karimli (AZE)	1

=== Final classification ===
Rank	Athlete	NOC
1st place, gold medalist(s)	Elisabeth Ebedo Diatta	Senegal
2nd place, silver medalist(s)	Reisa Kojima	Japan
3rd place, bronze medalist(s)	Stephie Ts imba Manzanza	Democratic Republic of the Congo
4	Gunel Karimli	Azerbaijan
5	Anastasija Jakovleva	Latvia
6	Stacy Rodríguez	Peru
7	Madalina Margareta Pavel	Romania
8	Rana Lahssini	Morocco
9	Xiomara Meza	Ecuador
10	Ikram Bali	Algeria
11	Kaydie Star	Nauru
12	Mariama Foula Kaba	Guinea
