= Fernanda Herrera =

Mexican-born Uzbekistani sabre fencer (born 2006)

Fernanda Herrara
Personal information
- Full name: Luisa Fernanda Herrera Lara
- Born: 26 February 2006 (age 20) Mexico City, Mexico
- Height: 1.50 m (4 ft 11 in)
- Weight: 40 kg (88 lb)

Fencing career
- Sport: Fencing
- Country: Uzbekistan (2022–present)
- Weapon: Sabre
- Hand: right-handed
- FIE ranking: current ranking
Medal record
Women's sabre
Representing Uzbekistan
Junior World Championships
Bronze medal – third place	2025 Wuxi	Team
Asian Games
Gold medal – first place	2022 Hangzhou	Team
Bronze medal – third place	2026 Aichi–Nagoya	Team
Islamic Solidarity Games
Silver medal – second place	2025 Riyadh	Team

Luisa Fernanda Herrera Lara (born 26 February 2006), known as Fernanda Herrera, is a Mexican-born naturalized Uzbekistani sabre fencer. In March 2023, she won an individual gold medal for Uzbekistan at the Asian Junior and Cadet Championship in Tashkent. In September 2023, she and her sister Paola Pliego won team gold in sabre fencing at the 2022 Asian Games in Hangzhou. Fernanda Herrara won another individual gold medal at a youth Fencing World Cup event in Tashkent in November 2023.

== Early life and education ==
Herrara is originally from Querétaro, Mexico, and was naturalized by Uzbekistan at age 13. Her family left Mexico after her sister Paola Pliego was wrongfully excluded from the 2016 Rio Olympics, due to a rigged doping test.

She started fencing at the age of 3, and now trains in Italy.

== Other career highlights ==
In 2023, Herrara won the individual bronze and team gold at the Sabi Youth Cup in Ankara, Turkey. Both she and her sister competed in the Asian Games and won team gold in September 2023.
