= Fencing at the 2026 Summer Youth Olympics – Women's sabre =

Women's sabre fencing event at the 2026 Summer Youth Olympics

Women's sabre at the IV Summer Youth Olympic Games
- Venue: Dakar Expo Center
- Dates: 12 November
- Competitors: 14 from 14 nations

Medalists
1st place, gold medalist(s)		Pan Qimiao	China
2nd place, silver medalist(s)		Jeon Yu-ju	South Korea
3rd place, bronze medalist(s)		Nargiza Utebaeva	Uzbekistan

The women's sabre competition at the 2026 Summer Youth Olympics was held at the Dakar Expo Center in Dakar, Senegal, on 12 November 2026. Thirteen fencers from thirteen National Olympic Committees competed in the event.

== Schedule ==
The competition was held on 10 November 2026 at the Dakar Expo Center. All times were as listed in the official competition schedule.

Date	Time	Phase
12 November 2026	10:30	Pool round
12 November 2026	11:30	Table of 16
12 November 2026	12:20	Table of 8
12 November 2026	14:00	Semifinals
12 November 2026	15:00	Bronze medal bout
12 November 2026	15:30	Gold medal bout

== Format ==
The competition consisted of a pool round followed by direct elimination. Fourteen fencers were divided into two pools. The pool round was followed by the Table of 16, Table of 8, semifinals and medal bouts.

== Results ==
=== Pool round ===
Fourteen fencers competed in two pools. The following tables show the pool results as published by the official Dakar 2026 results service.

==== Pool 1 ====
Pos.	Athlete	(Uzbekistan)	(France)	(Senegal)	(Honduras)	(Paraguay)	(China)	(Chile)	V#	M#	V/M	HS	HR	Diff.	PR
1	Nargiza Utebaeva (UZB)		V	V	V	V	V	V	6	6	1.000	30	13	+17	1
2	Nina Zacchia (FRA)	1		V	V	V	0	1	3	6	0.500	17	25	−8	4
3	Tening Diallo (SEN)	3	4		V	V	0	2	2	6	0.333	19	26	−7	5
4	Issabella García (HON)	1	3	4		2	0	1	0	6	0.000	11	30	–19	7
5	Jimena Cabrera (PAR)	3	3	2	V		2	1	1	6	0.167	16	27	–11	6
6	Pan Qimiao (CHN)	4	V	V	V	V		V	5	6	0.833	29	9	+20	2
7	Sofia Bossay (CHI)	1	V	V	V	V	2		4	6	0.667	23	15	+8	3

==== Pool 2 ====
Pos.	Athlete	(Burkina Faso)	(El Salvador)	(Guinea)	(Bolivia)	(Argentina)	(Brazil)	(South Korea)	V#	M#	V/M	HS	HR	Diff.	PR
1	Prisca Kinda (BUR)		3	V	0	1	1	2	1	6	0.167	12	28	–16	6
2	Kristy Villacorta (ESA)	V		V	1	2	0	0	2	6	0.333	13	23	–10	5
3	Fatoumata Camara (GUI)	3	0		0	1	1	0	0	6	0.000	5	30	–25	7
4	Briana Iriarte (BOL)	V	V	V		3	4	3	3	6	0.500	25	16	+9	4
5	Catalina Borrelli (ARG)	V	V	V	V		V	3	5	6	0.833	28	14	+14	2
6	Ana Beatriz Fraga (BRA)	V	V	V	V	2		2	4	6	0.667	24	16	+8	3
7	Jeon Yu-ju (KOR)	V	V	V	V	V	V		6	6	1.000	30	10	+20	1

Legend

- V – Victory
- V4 – Victory with four hits received
- Number – Hits scored by the fencer in a lost bout
- V# – Number of victories
- M# – Number of bouts
- V/M – Victory index (victories divided by bouts)
- HS – Hits scored
- HR – Hits received
- Diff. – Difference between hits scored and hits received (HS − HR)
- PR – Rank in pool
- MED – Medical

=== Bracket ===
Round of 16
9	Tening Diallo (SEN)	11
8	Nina Zacchia (FRA)	15
5	Ana Beatriz Fraga (BRA)	15
12	Prisca Kinda (BUR)	2
13	Issabella García (HON)	3
4	Catalina Borrelli (ARG)	15
3	Pan Qimiao (CHN)	15
14	Fatoumata Camara (GUI)	1
11	Jimena Cabrera (PAR)	2
6	Sofia Bossay (CHI)	15
7	Briana Iriarte (BOL)	15
10	Kristy Villacorta (ESA)	6

Quarterfinals
1	Jeon Yu-ju (KOR)	15
8	Nina Zacchia (FRA)	8
5	Ana Beatriz Fraga (BRA)	5
4	Catalina Borrelli (ARG)	15
3	Pan Qimiao (CHN)	15
6	Sofia Bossay (CHI)	8
7	Briana Iriarte (BOL)	6
2	Nargiza Utebaeva (UZB)	15

Semifinals
1	Jeon Yu-ju (KOR)	15
4	Catalina Borrelli (ARG)	9
3	Pan Qimiao (CHN)	15
2	Nargiza Utebaeva (UZB)	13

Gold medal bout
1	Jeon Yu-ju (KOR)	15
3	Pan Qimiao (CHN)	10
Bronze medal bout
4	Catalina Borrelli (ARG)	13
2	Nargiza Utebaeva (UZB)	15

=== Final standings ===
Rank	Athlete	Nation
1st place, gold medalist(s)	Pan Qimiao	China
2nd place, silver medalist(s)	Jeon Yu-ju	South Korea
3rd place, bronze medalist(s)	Nargiza Utebaeva	Uzbekistan
4	Catalina Borrelli	Argentina
5	Ana Beatriz Fraga	Brazil
6	Sofia Bossay	Chile
7	Briana Iriarte	Bolivia
8	Nina Zacchia	France
9	Tening Diallo	Senegal
10	Kristy Villacorta	El Salvador
11	Jimena Cabrera	Paraguay
12	Prisca Kinda	Burkina Faso
13	Issabella García	Honduras
14	Fatoumata Camara	Guinea
