= Fencing at the 2026 Asian Games – Women's team sabre =

Women's team sabre at the 2026 Asian Games
- Venue: Aichi Sky Expo Hall F
- Date: 27 September 2026
- Competitors: 43 from 11 nations

Medalists
gold medal	South Korea; Choi Se-bin, Jeon Ha-young, Kim Jeong-mi, Seo Ji-yeon
silver medal	Japan; Misaki Emura, Yuina Kaneko, Seri Ozaki, Yui Sano
bronze medal	China; Pan Qimiao, Rao Xueyi, Wei Jiayi, Zhang Xinyi
bronze medal	Uzbekistan; Zaynab Dayibekova, Fernanda Hererra, Gulistan Perdebaeva, Samira Shokirova

The women's team sabre competition at the 2026 Asian Games in Nagoya was held on 27 September 2026 at the Aichi Sky Expo Hall F. South Korea defeated Japan 45–31 in the final to reclaim the title it had last won in 2018. China and Uzbekistan shared the bronze medals.

== Schedule ==
All times are Japan Standard Time (UTC+09:00)

Date	Time	Event
Sunday, 27 September 2026	11:50	Table of 16
Sunday, 27 September 2026	12:50	Quarterfinals
Sunday, 27 September 2026	17:20	Semifinals
Sunday, 27 September 2026	19:40	Gold medal match

== Seeding ==
The teams were seeded taking into account the results achieved by competitors representing each team in the individual event.

Rank	Team	Fencer		Total
Rank	Team	1	2	Total
1	China (CHN)	3	4	7
2	Japan (JPN)	2	10	12
3	Uzbekistan (UZB)	6	13	19
4	Hong Kong (HKG)	12	18	30
5	South Korea (KOR)	9	23	32
6	India (IND)	14	20	34
7	Kazakhstan (KAZ)	19	27	46
8	Philippines (PHI)	21	27	48
9	Singapore (SGP)	30	32	62
10	Thailand (THA)	29	34	63
11	Indonesia (INA)	31	36	67

== Results ==
Table of 16
9	Singapore	45
8	Philippines	23
11	Indonesia	23
6	India	45
7	Kazakhstan	45
10	Thailand	32

Quarterfinals
1	China	45
9	Singapore	32
5	South Korea	45
4	Hong Kong	28
3	Uzbekistan	45
6	India	35
7	Kazakhstan	40
2	Japan	45

Semifinals
1	China	29
5	South Korea	45
3	Uzbekistan	33
2	Japan	45

Gold medal match
5	South Korea	45
2	Japan	31

== Final standing ==
Rank	Team
1st place, gold medalist(s)	South Korea (KOR); Choi Se-bin; Jeon Ha-young; Kim Jeong-mi; Seo Ji-yeon
2nd place, silver medalist(s)	Japan (JPN); Misaki Emura; Yuina Kaneko; Seri Ozaki; Yui Sano
3rd place, bronze medalist(s)	China (CHN); Pan Qimiao; Rao Xueyi; Wei Jiayi; Zhang Xinyi
3rd place, bronze medalist(s)	Uzbekistan (UZB); Zaynab Dayibekova; Fernanda Hererra; Gulistan Perdebaeva; Samira Shokirova
5	Hong Kong (HKG); Chu Wing Kiu; Lau Yee Ching; Laren Leung; Summer Fay Sit
6	India (IND); Bhavani Devi; Shreya Gupta; Jefarlin Simla Jani Rexlin; Shruti Joshi
7	Kazakhstan (KAZ); Karina Dospay; Anastassiya Gulik; Aigerim Sarybay; Kaisha Zhanybek
8	Philippines (PHI); Janna Allysah Catantan; Samantha Kyle Catantan; Queen Denise Dalmacio; Jylyn Nicanor
9	Singapore (SGP); Juliet Heng Jie Min; Jae Lim Jia En; Christine Tan Kai Li; Ashti Siva Kumar Thivya
10	Thailand (THA); Tonkhaw Phokaew; Poonyanuch Pithakduangkamol; Arisara Somphao; Peempat Wongthongsri
11	Indonesia (INA); Nia Ayu Agustina; Reni Anggraini; Fadilah Aprilia Budifirdausi
