= Nauru at the 2026 Summer Youth Olympics =

- Flag of Nauru
- IOC code: NRO
- NOC: Nauru Olympic Committee

in Dakar, Senegal October 31, 2026 – November 13, 2026
- Competitors: 3 in 2 sports
- Flag bearers: Kaydie Star & Joel Mwaredaga
- Medals: Gold 0 Silver 0 Bronze 0 Total 0

Summer Youth Olympics appearances
- 2010; 2014; 2018; 2026

Nauru (as Naoero) is scheduled to compete at the 2026 Summer Youth Olympics in Dakar, Senegal from October 31 to November 13, 2026. This will mark Nauru's fourth appearance at the Youth Olympics, after making its debut in 2010.

Wrestler Kaydie Star and athlete Joel Mwaredaga served as the flag bearers for the opening ceremony.

== Competitors ==
The following is the list of number of competitors participating at the Games per sport/discipline.

Sport	Men	Women	Total
Athletics	1	1	2
Beach wrestling	0	1	1
Total	1	2	3

== Athletics ==
Nauru entered two athletes, one male and one female.

Track events

Athlete	Event	Heat		Final	
Athlete	Event	Result	Rank	Result	Rank
Joel Mwaredaga	Men's 400 metres				
Mysha Cain	Women's 200 metres				

== Beach wrestling ==
Nauru entered one female athlete.

Athlete	Event	Group Stage				Semifinal	Final / BM	
Athlete	Event	Opposition Result	Opposition Result	Opposition Result	Rank	Opposition Result	Opposition Result	Rank
Kaydie Star	Women's -55 kg							

== See also ==
- Nauru at the 2026 Commonwealth Games
