= Women's team sabre at the 2025 World Fencing Championships =

- Venue: Olympic Palace
- Location: Tbilisi, Georgia
- Dates: 29 July (preliminaries); 30 July (finals)
- Competitors: 104 from 27 nations
- Teams: 27

Medalists
gold medal	Sara Balzer; Faustine Clapier; Sarah Noutcha; Toscane Tori	France
silver medal	Choi Se-bin; Jeon Ha-young; Kim Jeong-mi; Seo Ji-yeon	South Korea
bronze medal	Sugár Katinka Battai; Renáta Katona; Liza Pusztai; Luca Szűcs	Hungary

The Women's team sabre competition at the 2025 World Fencing Championships was held on 29 and 30 July 2025.

== Draw ==
=== Finals ===
Semifinals
France	45
Hungary	41
South Korea	45
Japan	36

Final
France	45
South Korea	37
Third place
Hungary	45
Japan	34

=== Top half ===
==== Section 1 ====
Round of 32
Kazakhstan	39
Uzbekistan	45
China	45
Mexico	39
Individual Neutral Athletes	45
Poland	39

Round of 16
France	45
Uzbekistan	36
China	45
Individual Neutral Athletes	39

Quarterfinals
France	45
China	31

==== Section 2 ====
Round of 32
Greece	34
Bulgaria	45
Germany	45
Great Britain	39

Round of 16
Ukraine	41
Bulgaria	45
Germany	39
Hungary	45

Quarterfinals
Bulgaria	38
Hungary	45

=== Bottom half ===
==== Section 3 ====
Round of 32
Egypt	45
Algeria	32
Azerbaijan	45
Singapore	33
Georgia	24
United States	45

Round of 16
South Korea	45
Egypt	40
Azerbaijan	26
United States	45

Quarterfinals
South Korea	45
United States	44

==== Section 4 ====
Round of 32
Italy	45
Iran	23
India	34
Spain	45
Hong Kong	45
Canada	31

Round of 16
Italy	42
Spain	45
Hong Kong	43
Japan	45

Quarterfinals
Spain	44
Japan	45

=== Placement rounds ===
==== 5–8th place bracket ====
5–8th place semifinals
China	32
Bulgaria	45
United States	45
Spain	41

Fifth place
Bulgaria	45
United States	41
Seventh place
China	44
Spain	45

==== 9–16th place bracket ====
9–16th place quarterfinals
Uzbekistan	34
Individual Neutral Athletes	45
Ukraine	37
Germany	45
Egypt	45
Azerbaijan	37
Italy	45
Hong Kong	43

9–12th place semifinals
Individual Neutral Athletes	45
Germany	40
Egypt	28
Italy	45

Ninth place
Individual Neutral Athletes	45
Italy	27
Eleventh place
Germany	45
Egypt	35

==== 13–16th place bracket ====
13–16th place semifinals
Uzbekistan	39
Ukraine	45
Azerbaijan	45
Hong Kong	39

13th place
Ukraine	44
Azerbaijan	45
15th place
Uzbekistan	45
Hong Kong	37

== Final ranking ==
Rank	Team
1st place, gold medalist(s)	France
2nd place, silver medalist(s)	South Korea
3rd place, bronze medalist(s)	Hungary
4	Japan
5	Bulgaria
6	United States
7	Spain
8	China
9	Individual Neutral Athletes
10	Italy
11	Germany
12	Egypt
13	Azerbaijan
14	Ukraine
15	Uzbekistan
16	Hong Kong
17	Poland
18	Algeria
19	Kazakhstan
20	Canada
21	United Kingdom
22	Greece
23	Singapore
24	India
25	Mexico
26	Iran
27	Georgia
