= Women's team sabre at the 2022 World Fencing Championships =

- Venue: Cairo Stadium Indoor Halls Complex
- Location: Cairo, Egypt
- Dates: 22–23 July
- Competitors: 116 from 29 nations
- Teams: 29

Medalists
gold medal	Sugár Katinka Battai; Renáta Katona; Liza Pusztai; Luca Szűcs	Hungary
silver medal	Sara Balzer; Sarah Noutcha; Anne Poupinet; Caroline Queroli	France
bronze medal	Misaki Emura; Shihomi Fukushima; Kanae Kobayashi; Seri Ozaki	Japan

The Women's team sabre competition at the 2022 World Fencing Championships was held on 22 and 23 July 2022.

== Draw ==
=== Finals ===
Semifinals
France	45
Japan	43
Hungary	45
Spain	31

Final
France	40
Hungary	45
Third place
Japan	45
Spain	43

=== Top half ===
==== Section 1 ====
Round of 32
Kazakhstan	45
Romania	37
China	45
Egypt	28
India	42
Azerbaijan	45

Round of 16
France	45
Kazakhstan	36
China	35
Azerbaijan	45

Quarterfinals
France	45
Azerbaijan	25

==== Section 2 ====
Round of 32
United States	45
Iran	35
Brazil	42
Canada	45
Turkey	45
Great Britain	41
Vietnam	31
Japan	45

Round of 16
United States	45
Canada	24
Turkey	23
Japan	45

Quarterfinals
United States	33
Japan	45

=== Bottom half ===
==== Section 3 ====
Round of 32
Greece	45
Ukraine	35
Bulgaria	45
Hong Kong	33
Uzbekistan	33
Hungary	45

Round of 16
Italy	45
Greece	42
Bulgaria	41
Hungary	45

Quarterfinals
Italy	43
Hungary	45

==== Section 4 ====
Round of 32
Spain	45
Georgia	32
Singapore	38
Poland	45
Germany	45
Algeria	34

Round of 16
Spain	45
Poland	42
Germany	45
South Korea	26

Quarterfinals
Spain	45
Germany	42

=== Placement rounds ===
==== 5–8th place bracket ====
5–8th place semifinals
Azerbaijan	45
United States	37
Italy	38
Germany	45

Fifth place
Azerbaijan	41
Germany	45
Seventh place
United States	37
Italy	45

==== 9–16th place bracket ====
9–16th place quarterfinals
Kazakhstan	45
China	41
Canada	45
Turkey	30
Greece	45
Bulgaria	41
Poland	38
South Korea	45

9–12th place semifinals
Kazakhstan	44
Canada	45
Greece	45
South Korea	29

Ninth place
Canada	45
Greece	42
Eleventh place
Kazakhstan	33
South Korea	45

==== 13–16th place bracket ====
13–16th place semifinals
China	45
Turkey	37
Bulgaria	36
Poland	45

13th place
China	41
Poland	45
15th place
Turkey	44
Bulgaria	45

== Final ranking ==
Rank	Team
1st place, gold medalist(s)	Hungary
2nd place, silver medalist(s)	France
3rd place, bronze medalist(s)	Japan
4	Spain
5	Germany
6	Azerbaijan
7	Italy
8	United States
9	Canada
10	Greece
11	South Korea
12	Kazakhstan
13	Poland
14	China
15	Bulgaria
16	Turkey
17	Ukraine
18	Romania
19	Algeria
20	Great Britain
21	Brazil
22	Hong Kong
23	Singapore
24	Egypt
25	India
26	Georgia
27	Uzbekistan
28	Iran
29	Vietnam
