= Blanka Nagy =

Hungarian fencer (born 2006)

Personal information
- Full name: Blanka Virág Nagy
- Born: 6 December 2006 (age 19)

Fencing career
- Sport: Fencing
- Country: Hungary
- Weapon: Épée
- Hand: Right-handed
Medal record
Women's épée
Representing Hungary
European Championships
| Silver medal – second place | 2024 Basel | Team |
| Silver medal – second place | 2026 Antony | Team |
Junior World Championships
| Silver medal – second place | 2025 Wuxi | Individual |
| Silver medal – second place | 2026 Rio de Janeiro | Team |

Blanka Virág Nagy (born 6 December 2006) is a Hungarian right-handed épée fencer.

== Career ==
Nagy competed at the 2023 Cadet Fencing World Championships and won a gold medal in the Individual event. She competed at the 2024 European Fencing Championships and won a silver medal in the team event.

In April 2025, she competed at the 2025 Junior Fencing World Championships and won a silver medal in the individual event.

In April 2026, she competed at the 2026 Junior Fencing World Championships and won a silver medal in the team event. She was forced to rest due to illness and missed the individual event. In June 2026, she competed at the 2026 European Fencing Championships and won a silver medal in the team event.
