= 2026 Junior and Cadet Fencing World Championships =

International fencing competition in Brazil

- Dates: 1–9 April 2026
- Host city: Rio de Janeiro, Brazil
- Venue: Carioca Arena 1 Rio Olympic Velodrome
- Events: 18

The 2026 Junior and Cadet Fencing World Championships took place from 1 to 9 April 2026 in Rio de Janeiro, Brazil.

== Medal summary ==
=== Junior ===
==== Men ====
Event	Gold	Silver	Bronze
Individual épée	Youssef Shamel; Egypt	Nathaniel Wimmer; United States	Kruz Schembri; U.S. Virgin Islands
Individual épée	Youssef Shamel; Egypt	Nathaniel Wimmer; United States	Artemios Tzovanis; Greece
Team épée	United States; Elijah Imrek; Simon Lioznyansky; James Sennewald; Nathaniel Wimmer	Israel; Eitan Efraim Charmatski; Fedor Khaperskiy; Mordechai Milu Lachman; Alon Sarid	Hungary; Máté Antal; Bence Balázs; Domonkos Pelle; Bence Taivainen
Individual foil	Lam Ho Long; Hong Kong	Abdelrahman Tolba; Egypt	Mattia De Cristofaro; Italy
Individual foil	Lam Ho Long; Hong Kong	Abdelrahman Tolba; Egypt	Emanuele Iaquinta; Italy
Team foil	United States; Peter Bruk; Roy Graham; Castor Kao; Luao Yang	France; Zakariya Anane; Maxime Dubreuil; Lucas Robinet; Guillaume Watson	Italy; Mattia Conticini; Mattia De Cristofaro; Emanuele Iaquinta; Elia Pasin
Individual sabre	Furkan Yaman; Turkey	William Morrill; United States	Ahmed Hesham; Egypt
Individual sabre	Furkan Yaman; Turkey	William Morrill; United States	Nurmukhammed Zhailybay; Kazakhstan
Team sabre	United States; Silas Choi; Shaun Kim; William Morrill; Emilio Paturzo Gonzalez	China; Qin Yuen; Tan Chao; Wu Jiasheng; Zhu Zihao	Turkey; Candeniz Berrak; Enes Talha Kalender; Furkan Yaman

==== Women ====
Event	Gold	Silver	Bronze
Individual épée	Sofija Prošina; Latvia	Louna Maiga; Switzerland	Nicole Xuan; Canada
Individual épée	Sofija Prošina; Latvia	Louna Maiga; Switzerland	Ruien Xiao; Canada
Team épée	Canada; Yanka Sobus; Ruien Xiao; Nicole Xuan; Julia Yin	Hungary; Gréta Gachályi; Lotti Horváth; Laura Kozma; Blanka Nagy	United States; Natalya Cafasso; Jolie Korfonta; Regina Lee; Leehi Machulsky
Individual foil	Jaelyn Liu; United States	Zhu Linlin; China	Shin Min-chae; South Korea
Individual foil	Jaelyn Liu; United States	Zhu Linlin; China	Jo Ju-hyun; South Korea
Team foil	China; Han Xiaoxuan; Jiao Enqi; Tie Zhihe; Zhu Linlin	Moldova; Uliana-Dumitrița Josan; Larissa Pensa; Adeline Senic	United States; Ella Calise; Caterina Fedeli; Jaelyn Liu; Katerina Lung
Individual sabre	Pan Qimiao; China	Aleksandra Mikhailova; Russia	Vittoria Mocci; Italy
Individual sabre	Pan Qimiao; China	Aleksandra Mikhailova; Russia	Gabriela Hwang; Puerto Rico
Team sabre	Russia; Malena Kunasheva; Aleksandra Mikhailova; Karina Tallada; Mariia Tretiakova	China; Gu Jiarong; Li Wanxuan; Pan Qimiao; Wang Chenyi	Hungary; Dorottya Csonka; Emese Domonkos; Boglárka Komjáthy; Csenge Kónya

=== Cadet ===
==== Men ====
Event	Gold	Silver	Bronze
Individual épée	Hiroaki Toto; France	Junzhe Shan; Canada	Oleksandr Stabnikov; Ukraine
Individual épée	Hiroaki Toto; France	Junzhe Shan; Canada	Kyosuke Ando; Japan
Individual foil	Harris Ho; Hong Kong	Choi Ji-an; South Korea	Masashi Maeda; Japan
Individual foil	Harris Ho; Hong Kong	Choi Ji-an; South Korea	Ziyu Wang; United States
Individual sabre	Aiden Tse; United States	Giorgi Urushadze; Georgia	Kenneth Kong; Sweden
Individual sabre	Aiden Tse; United States	Giorgi Urushadze; Georgia	Matei Radu; Romania

==== Women ====
Event	Gold	Silver	Bronze
Individual épée	Lotti Horváth; Hungary	Natalya Cafasso; United States	Alina Dmytruk; Ukraine
Individual épée	Lotti Horváth; Hungary	Natalya Cafasso; United States	Yanka Sobus; Canada
Individual foil	Jaelyn Liu; United States	Zhang Yixin; China	Ella Calise; United States
Individual foil	Jaelyn Liu; United States	Zhang Yixin; China	Danuta Tym; Poland
Individual sabre	Pan Qimiao; China	Yang Shuhan; Hong Kong	Anastasiia Isakova; Russia
Individual sabre	Pan Qimiao; China	Yang Shuhan; Hong Kong	Zara Djamirze; Australia

== Medal table ==
* Host nation (Brazil)

Rank	Nation	Gold	Silver	Bronze	Total
1	United States	6	3	4	13
2	China	3	4	0	7
3	Hong Kong	2	1	0	3
4	Canada	1	1	3	5
5	Hungary	1	1	2	4
6	Egypt	1	1	1	3
6	Russia	1	1	1	3
8	France	1	1	0	2
9	Turkey	1	0	1	2
10	Latvia	1	0	0	1
11	South Korea	0	1	2	3
12	Georgia	0	1	0	1
12	Israel	0	1	0	1
12	Moldova	0	1	0	1
12	Switzerland	0	1	0	1
16	Italy	0	0	4	4
17	Japan	0	0	2	2
17	Ukraine	0	0	2	2
19	Australia	0	0	1	1
19	Greece	0	0	1	1
19	Kazakhstan	0	0	1	1
19	Poland	0	0	1	1
19	Puerto Rico	0	0	1	1
19	Romania	0	0	1	1
19	Sweden	0	0	1	1
19	U.S. Virgin Islands	0	0	1	1
Totals (26 entries)		18	18	30	66
