= Wei Jiayi =

Chinese fencer (born 1996)

Personal information
- Born: 22 July 1996 (age 30)

Fencing career
- Sport: Fencing
- Country: China
- Weapon: Sabre
- Hand: Right-handed
Medal record
Women's sabre
Representing China
World Championships
Silver medal – second place	2026 Hong Kong	Team
Asian Championships
Gold medal – first place	2024 Kuwait City	Team
Asian Games
Bronze medal – third place	2026 Aichi–Nagoya	Team

Wei Jiayi (Chinese: 魏嘉怡; born 22 July 1996) is a Chinese right-handed sabre fencer.

== Career ==
Wei competed at the 2024 Asian Fencing Championships and won a gold medal in the team sabre event.

In July 2026, she competed at the 2026 World Fencing Championships and won a silver medal in the team sabre event.
