= Liza Pusztai =

Hungarian fencer (born 2001)

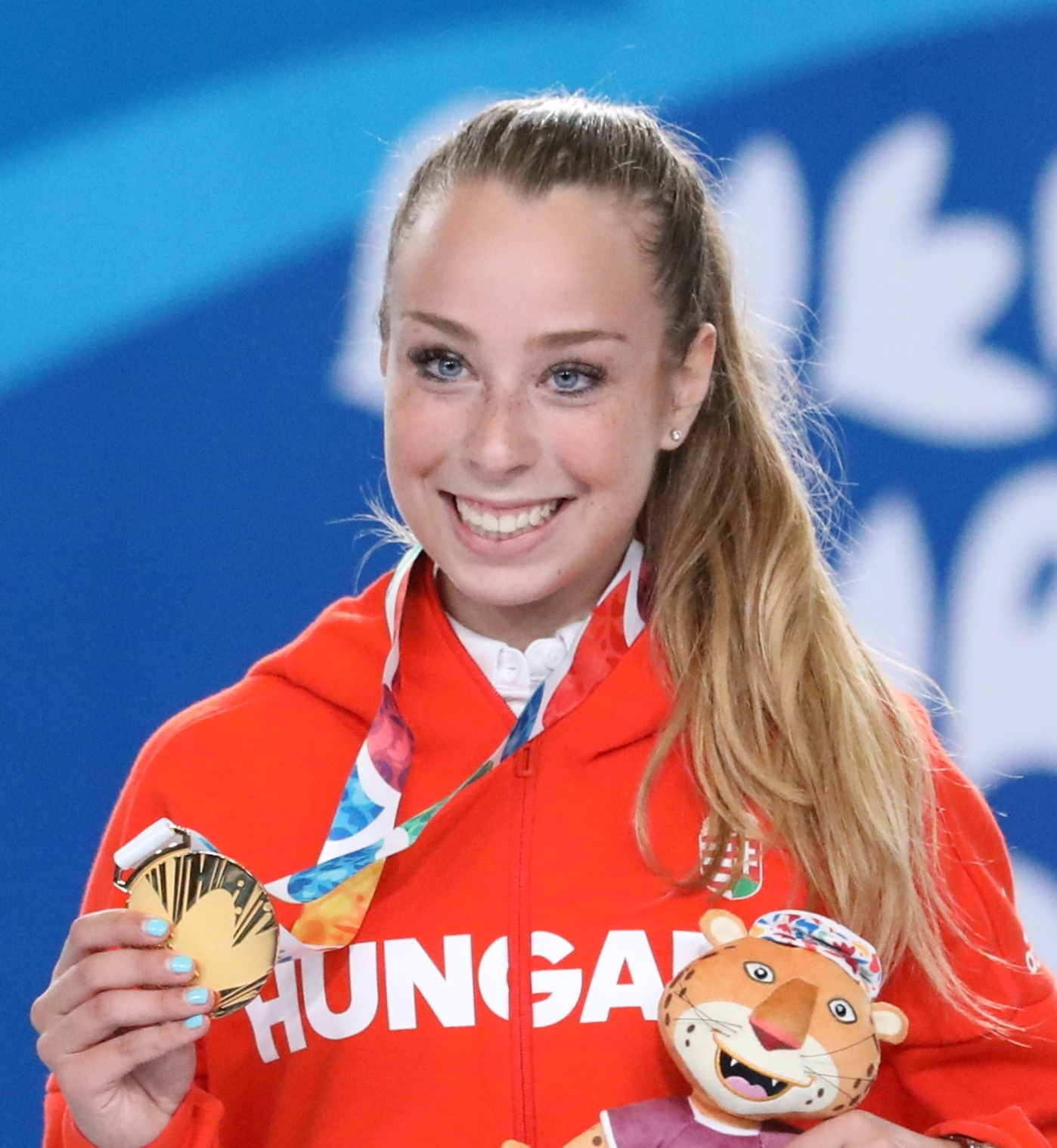
- Pusztai in 2018

Personal information
- Born: 11 May 2001 (age 25) Budapest, Hungary
- Height: 1.70 m (5 ft 7 in)
- Weight: 57 kg (126 lb)

Fencing career
- Sport: Fencing
- Country: Hungary
- Weapon: Sabre
- Hand: Right-handed
- Club: BVSC-Zugló
- FIE ranking: current ranking
Medal record
Women's sabre
Representing Hungary
World Championships
Gold medal – first place	2022 Cairo	Team
Gold medal – first place	2023 Milan	Team
Bronze medal – third place	2025 Tbilisi	Team
European Games
Bronze medal – third place	2023 Kraków–Małopolska	Team
European Championships
Silver medal – second place	2019 Düsseldorf	Team
Silver medal – second place	2024 Basel	Individual
Bronze medal – third place	2017 Tbilisi	Individual
Bronze medal – third place	2023 Kraków	Team
World Junior Championships
Gold medal – first place	2019 Toruń	Team
Bronze medal – third place	2017 Plovdiv	Individual
Bronze medal – third place	2018 Verona	Individual
Youth Olympic Games
Gold medal – first place	2018 Buenos Aires	Individual
World Cadet Championships
Gold medal – first place	2017 Plovdiv	Individual
Gold medal – first place	2018 Verona	Individual
Bronze medal – third place	2016 Bourges	Individual
Representing (International Olympic Committee) Mixed-NOCs
Youth Olympic Games
Gold medal – first place	2018 Buenos Aires	Mixed team

Liza Pusztai (born 11 May 2001) is a Hungarian sabre fencer. She is a two-time world champion in the team sabre and a two-time European Championships silver and bronze medallist. Pusztai represented Hungary at the 2020 Summer Olympics and 2024 Summer Olympics. She is also a junior world champion and two-time Youth Olympics gold medalist, having won the girls' sabre event and the mixed team event at the 2018 Summer Youth Olympics.

== Career ==
Pusztai won her first senior international medal at the 2017 European Championships in Tbilisi, where she won a bronze medal in the women's sabre event. In 2018, she won gold medals in the girls' sabre event and the mixed team event at the Summer Youth Olympics in Buenos Aires, and the gold medal in the women's sabre event at the Hungarian Fencing Championships held in Budapest. In 2019, she won the silver medal in the women's team sabre event at the European Championships in Düsseldorf.

In 2021, Pusztai competed in the women's sabre event and the women's team sabre event at the 2020 Summer Olympics held in Tokyo, where she was eliminated in the round of 16 and placed eight with the Hungarian team respectively. She won the gold medal in the women's team sabre event at the 2022 World Championships in Cairo. Pusztai and the Hungarian team retained their world title at the 2023 World Championships in Milan. In 2024, she won the silver medal in the women's sabre event at the 2024 European Championships held in Basel.

Pusztai competed in the 2024 Summer Olympics in Paris, reaching the round of 16 in the women's sabre event and placing sixth in the women's team sabre event.

== Medal record ==
=== World Championship ===
Date	Location	Event	Position
2022/07/23	Cairo, Egypt	Team Women's Sabre	1st
2023/07/30	Milan, Italy	Team Women's Sabre	1st
2025/07/30	(Georgia (country)) Tbilisi, Georgia	Team Women's Sabre	3rd

=== European Championship ===
Date	Location	Event	Position
2017/06/12	(Georgia (country)) Tbilisi, Georgia	Individual Women's Sabre	3rd
2019/06/20	Düsseldorf, Germany	Team Women's Sabre	2nd
2023/06/30	Kraków, Poland	Team Women's Sabre	3rd
2024/06/20	Basel, Switzerland	Individual Women's Sabre	2nd

=== Grand Prix ===
Date	Location	Event	Position
2019/05/24	Moscow, Russia	Individual Women's Sabre	3rd

=== World Cup ===
Date	Location	Event	Position
2018/03/16	Athens, Greece	Individual Women's Sabre	2nd
2019/03/08	Athens, Greece	Individual Women's Sabre	3rd
2020/03/06	Athens, Greece	Individual Women's Sabre	2nd
2021/03/12	Budapest, Hungary	Individual Women's Sabre	3rd

== Awards ==
- Hungarian Fencer of the Year: 2018, 2020
