= Rao Xueyi =

Chinese fencer (born 2005)

Personal information
- Born: 9 February 2005 (age 21)

Fencing career
- Sport: Fencing
- Country: China
- Weapon: Sabre
- Hand: Right-handed
Medal record
Women's sabre
Representing China
World Championships
Silver medal – second place	2026 Hong Kong	Team
Asian Championships
Gold medal – first place	2024 Kuwait City	Team
Asian Games
Bronze medal – third place	2026 Aichi–Nagoya	Individual
Bronze medal – third place	2026 Aichi–Nagoya	Team

Rao Xueyi (Chinese: 饶雪怡; born 9 February 2005) is a Chinese right-handed sabre fencer.

== Career ==
Rao competed at the 2024 Asian Fencing Championships and won a gold medal in the team sabre event. She won a bronze medal in the individual sabre at the 2026 Asian Fencing Championships.

In July 2026, she competed at the 2026 World Fencing Championships and advanced to the main draw in the individual sabre event, where she was eliminated in the round of 32. She also competed in the team sabre event and won a silver medal.
