= Larissa Eifler =

German fencer (born 1999)

Personal information
- Born: 17 June 1999 (age 27)

Fencing career
- Sport: Fencing
- Country: Germany
- Weapon: Sabre
- Hand: Right-handed
Medal record
Women's sabre
Representing Germany
World Championships
| Gold medal – first place | 2026 Hong Kong | Individual |

Larissa Eifler (born 17 June 1999) is a German right-handed sabre fencer. She won a gold medal in the individual sabre at the 2026 World Fencing Championships.

== Career ==
In 2022, Eifler became the U23 European Champion in the individual event. She was subsequently awarded the Silver Medal for Services to Sport by the Alsfeld mayor.

In July 2026, she competed at the 2026 World Fencing Championships and won a gold medal in the individual sabre event. This was the first gold medal for Germany at the World Fencing Championships since the men's sabre team in 2014, and the first individual World Championship gold since Peter Joppich in 2010.
