= Pan Qimiao =

Chinese fencer (born 2009)

Personal information
- Born: 9 June 2009 (age 17)

Fencing career
- Sport: Fencing
- Country: China
- Weapon: Sabre
- Hand: Right-handed
Medal record
Women's sabre
Representing China
World Championships
Silver medal – second place	2026 Hong Kong	Team
Bronze medal – third place	2025 Tblilisi	Individual
Asian Games
Bronze medal – third place	2026 Aichi–Nagoya	Individual
Bronze medal – third place	2026 Aichi–Nagoya	Team
Junior World Championships
Gold medal – first place	2026 Rio de Janeiro	Individual
Silver medal – second place	2026 Rio de Janeiro	Team
Bronze medal – third place	2025 Wuxi	Team
Cadet World Championships
Gold medal – first place	2026 Rio de Janeiro	Individual
Silver medal – second place	2025 Wuxi	Individual
Youth Olympic Games
Gold medal – first place	2026 Dakar	Individual

Pan Qimiao (Chinese: 潘其妙; born 9 June 2009) is a Chinese right-handed sabre fencer.

== Career ==
In July 2025, she competed at the 2025 World Fencing Championships and won a bronze medal in the individual sabre event at 16 years and 48 days old. She became the youngest fencer to medal at the World Fencing Championships since Rebecca Ward in 2005.

In April 2026, she competed at the 2026 Junior and Cadet Fencing World Championships and won gold medals in the junior and cadet individual sabre events. In July 2026, she competed at the 2026 World Fencing Championships and won a silver medal in the team sabre event.

In November 2026, she represented China at the 2026 Summer Youth Olympics and won a gold medal in the individual sabre event.
