= Faustine Clapier =

French fencer (born 2001)

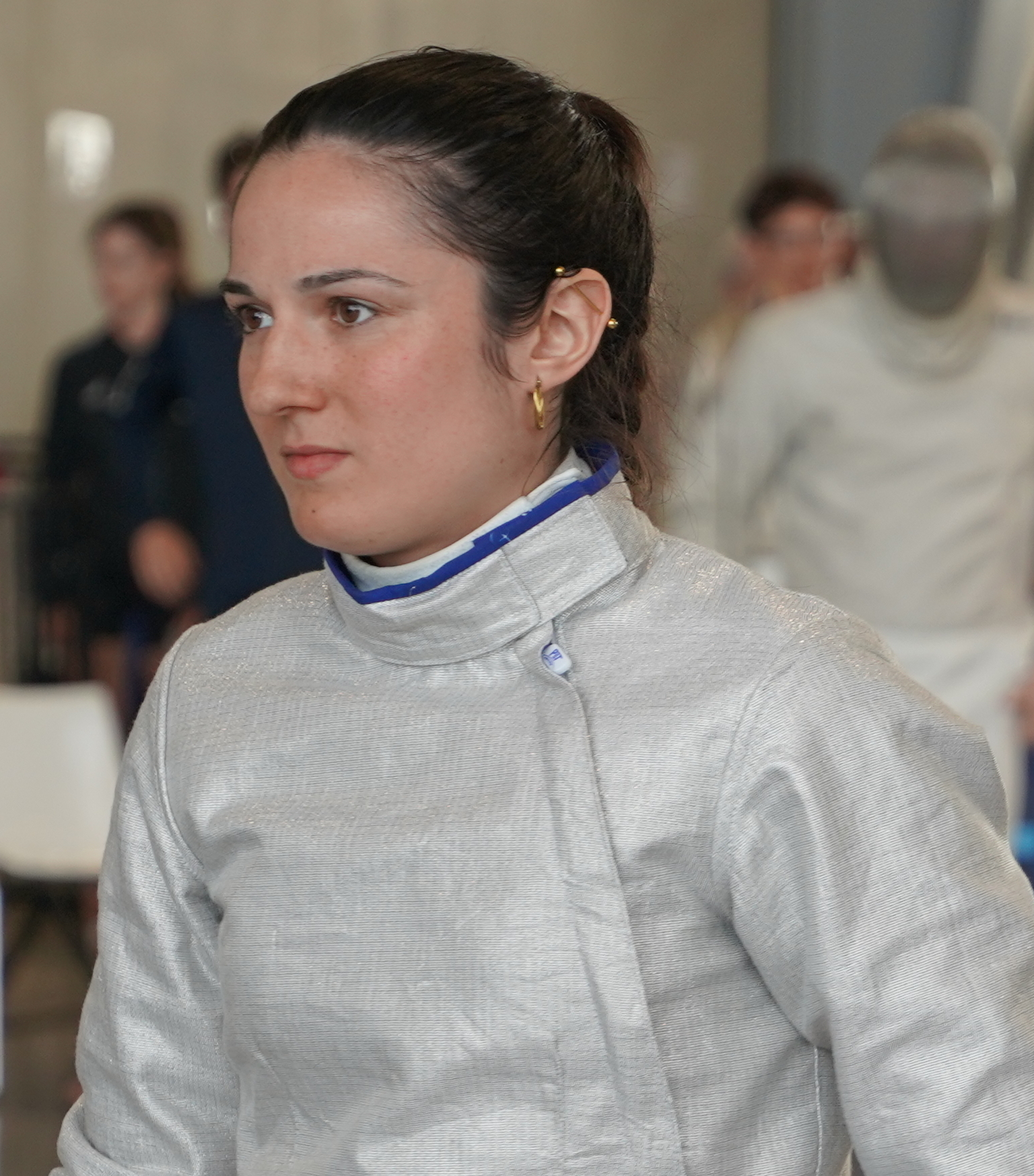
- Clapier in 2023

Personal information
- Born: 6 December 2001 (age 24)

Fencing career
- Sport: Fencing
- Country: France
- Weapon: Sabre
- Hand: Right-handed
Medal record
Women's sabre
Representing France
World Championships
| Gold medal – first place | 2025 Tbilisi | Team |
European Championships
| Gold medal – first place | 2025 Genoa | Team |

Faustine Clapier (born 6 December 2001) is a French right-handed sabre fencer. She won a gold medal in the women's team sabre at the 2025 World Fencing Championships.

== Career ==
In June 2025, Clapier competed at the 2025 European Fencing Championships and won a gold medal in the team event. The next month she competed at the 2025 World Fencing Championships and won a gold medal in the team sabre event.

== Medal record ==
=== World Championship ===
| Year | Location | Event | Position |
|---|---|---|---|
| 2025 | (Georgia (country)) Tbilisi, Georgia | Team Women's Sabre | 1st |
