= Women's team sabre at the 2026 World Fencing Championships =

- Venue: AsiaWorld–Expo
- Location: Hong Kong
- Dates: 29 July
- Competitors: 109 from 28 nations
- Teams: 28

Medalists
gold medal	Sugár Katinka Battai; Anna Spiesz; Luca Szűcs; Renáta Katona	Hungary
silver medal	Pan Qimiao; Rao Xueyi; Wei Jiayi; Zhang Xinyi	China
bronze medal	Manon Brunet; Sara Balzer; Sarah Noutcha; Toscane Tori	France

The Women's team sabre competition at the 2026 World Fencing Championships was held on 29 July 2026.

== Draw ==
=== Finals ===
Semifinals
France	44
Hungary	45
United States	36
China	45

Final
Hungary	45
China	41
Third place
France	45
United States	40

=== Top half ===
==== Section 1 ====
Round of 32
Egypt	33
Hong Kong	45
Spain	45
Singapore	32
Romania	21
Italy	45

Round of 16
France	45
Hong Kong	43
Spain	38
Italy	45

Quarterfinals
France	45
Italy	44

==== Section 2 ====
Round of 32
Japan	45
Australia	26
Venezuela	26
Poland	45
Azerbaijan	45
Canada	34

Round of 16
Japan	45
Poland	37
Azerbaijan	32
Hungary	45

Quarterfinals
Japan	36
Hungary	45

=== Bottom half ===
==== Section 3 ====
Round of 32
Kazakhstan	33
Ukraine	45
Germany	45
India	32
Philippines	25
United States	45

Round of 16
Russia	44
Ukraine	45
Germany	42
United States	45

Quarterfinals
Ukraine	44
United States	45

==== Section 4 ====
Round of 32
China	45
Thailand	21
Great Britain	34
Bulgaria	45
Uzbekistan	45
Algeria	34

Round of 16
China	45
Bulgaria	33
Uzbekistan	30
South Korea	45

Quarterfinals
China	45
South Korea	41

=== Placement rounds ===
==== 5–8th place bracket ====
5–8th place semifinals
Italy	32
Japan	45
Ukraine	45
South Korea	39

Fifth place
Japan	45
Ukraine	39
Seventh place
Italy	45
South Korea	39

==== 9–16th place bracket ====
9–16th place quarterfinals
Hong Kong	32
Spain	45
Poland	45
Azerbaijan	34
Russia	45
Germany	42
Bulgaria	43
Uzbekistan	45

9–12th place semifinals
Spain	45
Poland	35
Russia	45
Uzbekistan	42

Ninth place
Spain	45
Russia	44
Eleventh place
Poland	44
Uzbekistan	45

==== 13–16th place bracket ====
13–16th place semifinals
Hong Kong	40
Azerbaijan	45
Germany	40
Bulgaria	45

13th place
Azerbaijan	45
Bulgaria	36
15th place
Hong Kong	45
Germany	36

== Final ranking ==
Rank	Team
1st place, gold medalist(s)	Hungary
2nd place, silver medalist(s)	China
3rd place, bronze medalist(s)	France
4	United States
5	Japan
6	Ukraine
7	Italy
8	South Korea
9	Spain
10	Russia
11	Uzbekistan
12	Poland
13	Azerbaijan
14	Bulgaria
15	Hong Kong
16	Germany
17	Egypt
18	Algeria
19	Kazakhstan
20	Canada
21	Venezuela
22	India
23	Great Britain
24	Singapore
25	Romania
26	Thailand
27	Philippines
28	Australia
