= Sugár Katinka Battai =

Hungarian fencer (born 2003)

Personal information
- Nationality: Hungarian
- Born: 17 April 2003 (age 23) Debrecen, Hungary

Fencing career
- Sport: Fencing
- Country: Hungary
- Weapon: Sabre
- Hand: Left-handed
- FIE ranking: current ranking
Medal record
Women's sabre
Representing Hungary
World Championships
Gold medal – first place	2022 Cairo	Team
Gold medal – first place	2023 Milan	Team
Gold medal – first place	2026 Hong Kong	Team
Bronze medal – third place	2025 Tbilisi	Team
Bronze medal – third place	2026 Hong Kong	Individual
European Games
Bronze medal – third place	2023 Kraków–Małopolska	Team
European Championships
Bronze medal – third place	2023 Kraków	Team
Bronze medal – third place	2025 Genoa	Individual
World Junior Championships
Gold medal – first place	2019 Toruń	Team
Silver medal – second place	2022 Dubai	Team
Bronze medal – third place	2022 Dubai	Individual

Sugár Katinka Battai (born 17 April 2003) is a Hungarian sabre fencer. She is a three-time world champion and won the women's team sabre event at the World Championships in 2022, 2023 and 2026. Battai is a two-time Olympian and represented Hungary in the women's team sabre events at the 2020 Summer Olympics and 2024 Summer Olympics. She is also a World Junior Championships gold, silver and bronze medallist.

== Medal record ==
=== World Championship ===
Date	Location	Event	Position
23 July 2022	Cairo, Egypt	Team Women's Sabre	1st
30 July 2023	Milan, Italy	Team Women's Sabre	1st
20 July 2025	(Georgia (country)) Tbilisi, Georgia	Team Women's Sabre	3rd
26 July 2026	Hong Kong, China	Individual Women's Sabre	3rd
29 July 2026	Hong Kong, China	Team Women's Sabre	1st

=== European Championship ===
Date	Location	Event	Position
30 June 2023	Kraków, Poland	Team Women's Sabre	3rd

=== World Cup ===
Date	Location	Event	Position
3 March 2023	Athens, Greece	Individual Women's Sabre	1st
