= Pamela Brind'Amour =

Canadian fencer (born 1993)

Personal information
- Nationality: Canada
- Born: January 12, 1993 (age 33) Châteauguay, Quebec, Canada
- Home town: Sainte-Martine, Quebec, Canada
- Height: 178 cm (5 ft 10 in)

Sport
- Sport: Fencing
Medal record
Women's fencing
Representing Canada
Pan American Games
Silver medal – second place	2023 Santiago	Team sabre
Bronze medal – third place	2019 Lima	Team sabre
Pan American Fencing Championships
Silver medal – second place	2024 Lima	Team sabre
Silver medal – second place	2023 Lima	Sabre
Silver medal – second place	2016 Panama City	Team sabre
Bronze medal – third place	2024 Lima	Sabre
Pan American Junior Fencing Championships
Silver medal – second place	2013 Ponce	Foil

Pamela Brind'Amour (born January 12, 1993) is a Canadian fencer in the sabre discipline. Brind'Amour has won multiple medals at the Pan American level.

== Career ==
Brind'Amour's first major international result came in 2013, when she won the gold medal at the Pan American Junior Fencing Championships in Ponce, Puerto Rico in the individual foil event. Brind'Amour would later switch to the sabre discipline as she felt her changes of qualifying for the Olympics in the foil discipline were low. In 2022, finished 52nd at a World Cup stop in Algeria. Brind'Amour was officially named to Canada's 2024 Olympic team in April 2024.

=== Pan American Games ===
Brind'Amour has competed at three Pan American Games. Brind'Amour's first appearance came at the 2015 Pan American Games in Toronto. Four years later, at the 2019 Pan American Games, Brind'Amour was part of the bronze medal-winning sabre team. At the 2023 Pan American Games in Santiago, Chile, Brind'Amour was part of the silver winning sabre team.
