= Zuzanna Cieślar =

Polish fencer (born 2000)

Personal information
- Born: 8 November 2000 (age 25)

Fencing career
- Sport: Fencing
- Country: Poland
- Weapon: Sabre
- Hand: Right-handed
- Club: ZKS Sosnowiec
- Head coach: Tomasz Dominik
Medal record
Women's sabre
Representing Poland
World Championships
Silver medal – second place	2025 Tbilisi	Individual
European Championships
Silver medal – second place	2025 Genoa	Team
Bronze medal – third place	2022 Antalya	Individual
Bronze medal – third place	2024 Basel	Individual

Zuzanna Cieślar (born 8 November 2000) is a Polish right-handed sabre fencer. She won a silver medal in the women's sabre event at the 2025 World Fencing Championships.

== Career ==
She competed at the 2022 European Fencing Championships and won a bronze medal in the individual sabre event. She again competed at the 2024 European Fencing Championships and won a bronze medal in the individual sabre event.

In June 2025, Cieślar competed at the 2025 European Fencing Championships and won a silver medal in the team sabre event. The next month she competed at the 2025 World Fencing Championships and won a silver medal in the individual sabre event. She became the first Polish sabre fencer to reach the World Fencing Championships individual event final.
