= Choi Se-bin =

South Korean fencer

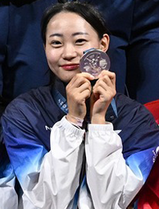

Personal information
- Born: 11 August 2000 (age 26) Suwon, South Korea
- Height: 1.73 m (5 ft 8 in)
Medal record
Women's sabre
Representing South Korea
Olympic Games
Silver medal – second place	2024 Paris	Team
World Championships
Silver medal – second place	2025 Tbilisi	Team
Bronze medal – third place	2023 Milan	Team
World University Games
Gold medal – first place	2025 Rhine-Ruhr	Team
Asian Games
Gold medal – first place	2026 Aichi–Nagoya	Team
Bronze medal – third place	2022 Hangzhou	Team

Choi Se-bin (Korean: 최세빈; born 11 August 2000) is a South Korean sabre fencer. She qualified for the 2024 Summer Olympics where she placed 4th in Individual event and won a silver medal in the Team event.

== Medal record ==
=== World Championship ===
Year	Location	Event	Position
2025	(Georgia (country)) Tbilisi, Georgia	Team Women's Sabre	2nd
