= Maia Chamberlain =

American fencer (born 1998)

Personal information
- Born: June 5, 1998 (age 28) Palo Alto, California, U.S.

Fencing career
- Sport: Fencing
- Country: United States
- Weapon: Sabre
- Hand: Right-handed
Medal record
Women's sabre
Representing the United States
Pan American Games
Gold medal – first place	2023 Santiago	Team
Silver medal – second place	2023 Santiago	Individual
Pan American Championships
Gold medal – first place	2023 Lima	Team
Gold medal – first place	2024 Lima	Team
Gold medal – first place	2025 Rio de Janeiro	Individual
Gold medal – first place	2025 Rio de Janeiro	Team
Gold medal – first place	2026 Lima	Team
Silver medal – second place	2024 Lima	Individual

Maia Chamberlain (born June 5, 1998) is an American right-handed sabre fencer. She represented the United States at the 2024 Summer Olympics.

== Early life and education ==
Chamberlain was born to Warren Chamberlain and Lin Chan. She attended Sequoia High School in Redwood City, California. She then attended Princeton University where she was a member of the fencing team. During the 2017–18 season, she was the NCAA fencing championships saber champion.

== Career ==
In June 2023, Chamberlain competed at the 2023 Pan American Fencing Championships and won a gold medal in the team sabre event. She then competed at the 2023 Pan American Games and won a gold medal in the team sabre and a silver medal in the individual sabre event.

Chamberlain represented the United States at the 2024 Summer Olympics and finished in fifth place in the team sabre event.

In June 2025, she competed at the 2025 Pan American Fencing Championships and won a gold medal in the individual and team sabre events. She again competed at the 2026 Pan American Fencing Championships and won a gold medal in the team sabre events.

== Medal record ==
=== World Cup ===
Date	Location	Event	Position
2026-11-12	Cairo, Egypt	Individual Women's Sabre	1st
