= Yui Sano =

Japanese sabre fencer

Personal information
- Native name: 佐野 佑衣
- Born: December 16, 2000 (age 25)
- Education: Asahi University

Fencing career
- Sport: Fencing
- Country: Japan
- Weapon: Sabre
- Hand: Left-handed
- Club: Oriental Yeast Co., Ltd.
Medal record
Representing Japan
Women's sabre
Asian Games
Silver medal – second place	2026 Aichi–Nagoya	Team
Asian Championships
Gold medal – first place	2025 Bali	Team
Gold medal – first place	2026 New Delhi	Individual
Silver medal – second place	2026 New Delhi	Team
Fencing World Cup
Bronze medal – third place	2026 Tashkent	Team
Bronze medal – third place	2026 Athens	Team

Yui Sano (Japanese: 佐野 佑衣; born 16 December 2000) is a Japanese sabre fencer. She represents Japan in international competitions and is affiliated with Oriental Yeast Co., Ltd. Her major achievements include winning the women's individual sabre title at the 2026 Asian Fencing Championships, team gold at the 2025 Asian Fencing Championships, and team silver at the 2026 Asian Games.

== Career ==
Sano was born on 16 December 2000 and studied at Asahi University. She joined Oriental Yeast Co., Ltd. in April 2025 and competes in women's sabre. She has represented Japan in senior international competitions, including Asian championships and World Cup events.

In June 2025, Sano was part of the Japanese women's sabre team that won gold at the Asian Fencing Championships in Bali, Indonesia. Japan defeated Singapore in the quarter-finals and China in the semi-finals before beating South Korea 45–44 in the final. The victory was Japan's first gold medal in the women's team sabre at the Asian Championships.

In March 2026, Sano helped Japan win bronze in the women's team sabre at the World Cup in Tashkent, Uzbekistan. Japan defeated Germany in the quarter-finals and later beat Poland 45–44 in the bronze-medal match after losing its semi-final to the neutral athletes' team.

At the Asian Fencing Championships in New Delhi in June 2026, Sano won the women's individual sabre title. She defeated Kazakhstan's Anastassiya Gulik in the quarter-finals, Uzbekistan's Gulistan Perdebaeva in the semi-finals, and South Korea's Choi Se-bin 15–12 in the final. She also won silver in the women's team sabre, as Japan lost 45–35 to South Korea in the final.

At the 2026 Asian Games in Aichi–Nagoya, Japan, Sano competed in the women's team sabre event alongside Misaki Emura, Yuina Kaneko and Seri Ozaki. Japan defeated Singapore in the quarter-finals and China in the semi-finals to reach the final against South Korea. The Japanese team lost 45–31 and received the silver medal.
