= Chaima Benadouda =

Algerian fencer (born 2003)

Personal information
- Nationality: Algerian
- Born: 17 December 2003 (age 22) Hydra, Algeria

Fencing career
- Sport: Fencing
- Country: Algeria
- Weapon: sabre

Chaima Benadouda (born 17 December 2003) is an Algerian fencer. At the 2024 Summer Olympics, she competed in the women's individual sabre event, where she lost in the Round of 64 to Aigerim Sarybay, and the women's team sabre event, where the Algerian team finished 8th overall.
