= Kim Jeong-mi =

South Korean handball player (born 1975)

- Korean name
- Hangul: 김정미
- RR: Gim Jeongmi
- MR: Kim Chŏngmi

Olympic medal record

Women's Handball
Silver medal – second place	1996 Atlanta	Team

World Championship
Gold medal – first place	1995 Austria/Hungary	

Asian Games
Gold medal – first place	1994 Hiroshima	

Kim Jeong-mi (born February 7, 1975) is a South Korean handball player who is a world champion from 1995 and an Olympic silver medalist from 1996.

In 1995 she was part of the South Korea team that won the 1995 World Championship. In the 1996 Summer Olympics she was part of the South Korean team which won the silver medal. She played one match.

She also won a gold medal at the 1994 Asian Games.

At club level she played for LC Brühl in Switzerland. Here she won the Swiss Championship in 2002 and 2003.
