= Jeon Ha-young =

South Korean fencer (born 2001)

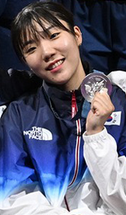
- Jeon at the 2024 Summer Olympics

Personal information
- Born: 18 August 2001 (age 25) Daejeon, South Korea
Medal record
Women's sabre
Representing South Korea
Olympic Games
Silver medal – second place	2024 Paris	Team
World Championships
Silver medal – second place	2025 Tbilisi	Team
Bronze medal – third place	2023 Milan	Team
World University Games
Gold medal – first place	2025 Rhine-Ruhr	Individual
Gold medal – first place	2025 Rhine-Ruhr	Team
Asian Games
Gold medal – first place	2026 Aichi–Nagoya	Team

Jeon Ha-young (Korean: 전하영; born 18 August 2001) is a South Korean fencer. She competed in the 2024 Summer Olympics.

== Medal record ==
=== World Championship ===
Year	Location	Event	Position
2025	(Georgia (country)) Tbilisi, Georgia	Team Women's Sabre	2nd
