= Yuina Kaneko =

Japanese sabre fencer

Personal information
- Native name: 金子 優衣奈
- Born: June 23, 2003 (age 23) Saitama Prefecture, Japan
- Education: Nihon University

Fencing career
- Sport: Fencing
- Country: Japan
- Weapon: Sabre
- Hand: Left-handed
- Club: Miki House
Medal record
Representing Japan
Women's sabre
Asian Games
Silver medal – second place	2026 Aichi–Nagoya	Team
Asian Championships
Gold medal – first place	2025 Bali	Team
Silver medal – second place	2026 New Delhi	Team
World Junior Championships
Silver medal – second place	2023 Plovdiv	Individual

Yuina Kaneko (Japanese: 金子 優衣奈; born 23 June 2003) is a Japanese sabre fencer. She represents Japan in international fencing competitions and is affiliated with Miki House. Her achievements include silver in the women's individual sabre at the 2023 World Junior Fencing Championships, gold in the team event at the 2025 Asian Fencing Championships, and silver in the women's team sabre at the 2026 Asian Games.

== Career ==
Kaneko was born in Saitama Prefecture, Japan, on 23 June 2003. She attended Kojimachi Gakuen Girls' High School and entered Nihon University in 2022, graduating in March 2026. She began fencing in the sabre discipline during her first year of junior high school and won a national competition as a junior high school student. At university, she won individual and team titles at the All-Japan Intercollegiate Fencing Championships, including four consecutive team titles. She also reached the podium at the All-Japan Fencing Championships in three consecutive years.

Kaneko won a silver medal in the women's individual sabre at the 2022 Junior World Cup in Istanbul. In 2023, she won another silver medal in the junior women's individual sabre event at the World Junior and Cadet Fencing Championships in Plovdiv, Bulgaria, finishing behind American fencer Magda Skarbonkiewicz.

Kaneko joined Japan's senior women's sabre team in 2024. In 2025, she helped Japan win its first gold medal in the women's team sabre at the Asian Fencing Championships in Bali, Indonesia. The Japanese team also won gold in the team event at a World Cup competition in Bulgaria that year. Japan finished fourth in the women's team sabre at the 2025 World Fencing Championships.

In 2026, Kaneko was part of the Japanese women's sabre team that won bronze medals at World Cup competitions in Tashkent, Uzbekistan, and Athens, Greece. In June, she helped Japan win silver in the women's team sabre at the Asian Fencing Championships in New Delhi. Japan reached the final after defeating Singapore and China, before losing to South Korea.

At the 2026 Asian Games in Aichi–Nagoya, Japan, Kaneko competed in both the women's individual and team sabre events. In the team competition, Japan defeated Singapore in the quarter-finals and China in the semi-finals to reach the final against South Korea. The Japanese team, consisting of Kaneko, Misaki Emura, Yui Sano and Seri Ozaki, lost the final 45–31 and received the silver medal.
