= Natalia Botello =

Mexican fencer (born 2002)

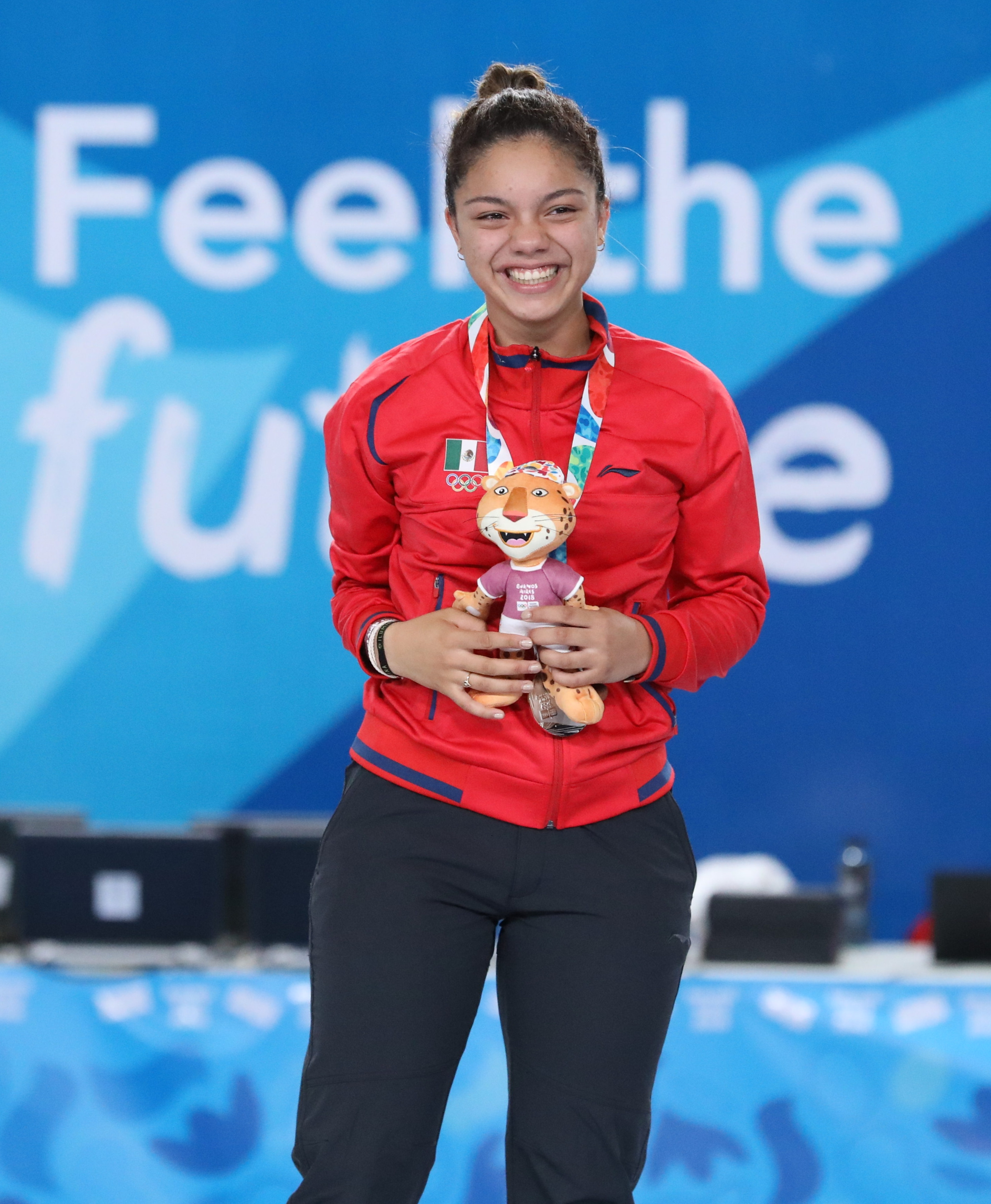
- Natalia Botello in 2018

Personal information
- Born: 6 August 2002 (age 23) Tijuana, Baja California, Mexico

Fencing career
- Sport: Fencing
- Country: Mexico
- Hand: Left-handed
Medal record
Women's fencing
Representing Mexico
Summer Youth Olympics
Silver medal – second place	2018 Buenos Aires	Individual sabre
Pan American Championships
Gold medal – first place	2026 Lima	Individual sabre
Silver medal – second place	2025 Rio de Janeiro	Individual sabre
Bronze medal – third place	2026 Lima	Team sabre
Pan American Games
Bronze medal – third place	2023 Santiago	Team sabre
Junior Pan American Games
Bronze medal – third place	2021 Cali-Valle	Individual sabre
Representing (International Olympic Committee) Mixed-NOCs
Summer Youth Olympics
Bronze medal – third place	2018 Buenos Aires	Mixed team

Natalia Botello (born 6 August 2002) is a Mexican fencer. She won the silver medal in the girls' sabre event at the 2018 Summer Youth Olympics held in Buenos Aires, Argentina. She also won the bronze medal in the mixed team event.

She represented Mexico at the 2019 Pan American Games in Lima, Peru in the women's sabre event without winning a medal. She qualified to compete in the elimination round where she was eliminated in her first match by María Perroni of Argentina.
