= Fencing at the 2017 Summer Universiade – Men's individual foil =

Men's individual foil at the XXIX Summer Universiade
- Venues: Taipei Nangang Exhibition Center
- Dates: 22 August 2017
- Competitors: 69 from 32 nations

Medalists
1st place, gold medalist(s)		Dmytro Chuchukalo	Ukraine
2nd place, silver medalist(s)		Kyosuke Matsuyama	Japan
3rd place, bronze medalist(s)		Alessandro Paroli	Italy
3rd place, bronze medalist(s)		Rostyslav Hertsyk	Ukraine

The men's individual foil fencing event at the 2017 Summer Universiade was held 22 August at the Taipei Nangang Exhibition Center in Taipei, Taiwan.

== Pool Results ==
Qualified for Ranking Round

=== Pool 1 ===
#	Seed	Athlete	1	2	3	4	5	6	7	V#	M#	Ind.	TG	TR	Diff.	RP	RT
1	1	Ha Yae-gyu (KOR)		V	V	V	V	V	V	6	6	1.000	30	13	17	1	3
2	20	Erwann Auclin (FRA)	D_{3}		D_{4}	V	V	V	D_{3}	3	6	0.500	25	22	3	4	31
3	21	Ryohei Noguchi (JPN)	D_{3}	V		V	D_{1}	V	D_{2}	3	6	0.500	21	23	–2	5	38
4	40	O Chun Yee (HKG)	D_{2}	D_{3}	D_{4}		D_{0}	V	V	2	6	0.333	19	25	–6	6	50
5	41	Grigoriy Semenyuk (RUS)	D_{3}	D_{4}	V	V		V	D_{3}	3	6	0.500	25	16	9	3	29
6	60	Sanjeep Lama (NEP)	D_{0}	D_{0}	D_{0}	D_{1}	D_{0}		D_{0}	0	6	0.000	1	30	–29	7	69
7	62	David Hadler (TPE)	D_{2}	V	V	D_{4}	V	V		4	6	0.667	26	18	8	2	22

=== Pool 2 ===
#	Seed	Athlete	1	2	3	4	5	6	7	V#	M#	Ind.	TG	TR	Diff.	RP	RT
1	2	Toshiya Saito (JPN)		V	V	V	V	V	V	6	6	1.000	30	8	22	1	1
2	19	Andras Nemeth (HUN)	D_{1}		V	V	D_{3}	V	D_{1}	3	6	0.500	20	23	–3	4	40
3	22	Rostyslav Hertsyk (UKR)	D_{1}	D_{4}		V	D_{3}	V	D_{4}	2	6	0.333	22	25	–3	5	43
4	39	Ludwik De Bazelaire (POL)	D_{2}	D_{1}	D_{3}		D_{2}	V	D_{4}	1	6	0.167	17	27	–10	6	55
5	42	Stef de Greef (BEL)	D_{0}	V	V	V		V	D_{3}	4	6	0.667	23	20	3	3	26
6	59	Zhang Yu (CHN)	D_{2}	D_{3}	D_{2}	D_{2}	D_{2}		D_{0}	0	6	0.000	11	30	–19	7	64
7	61	Lee Young-hoon (KOR)	D_{2}	V	V	V	V	V		5	6	0.833	27	17	10	2	14

=== Pool 3 ===
#	Seed	Athlete	1	2	3	4	5	6	7	V#	M#	Ind.	TG	TR	Diff.	RP	RT
1	3	Takahiro Shikine (JPN)		V	V	V	D_{0}	V	V	5	6	0.833	25	19	6	3	17
2	18	Maxime Pauty (FRA)	D_{4}		V	V	V	V	V	5	6	0.833	29	11	18	1	7
3	23	Christopher Nagle (AUS)	D_{3}	D_{0}		V	D_{2}	V	V	3	6	0.500	20	19	1	4	35
4	38	Pedro Macedo (POR)	D_{3}	D_{1}	D_{2}		D_{3}	V	V	2	6	0.333	19	20	–1	5	42
5	43	Iskander Akhmetov (RUS)	V	D_{2}	V	V		V	V	5	6	0.833	27	12	15	2	12
6	58	Niv Gross (ISR)	D_{4}	D_{3}	D_{1}	D_{0}	D_{1}		V	1	6	0.167	14	26	–12	6	59
7	63	Singh Sarbjeet (IND)	D_{0}	D_{0}	D_{1}	D_{0}	D_{1}	D_{1}		0	6	0.000	3	30	–27	7	68

=== Pool 4 ===
#	Seed	Athlete	1	2	3	4	5	6	7	V#	M#	Ind.	TG	TR	Diff.	RP	RT
1	4	Kyosuke Matsuyama (JPN)		D_{4}	V	V	V	V	V	5	6	0.833	29	14	15	2	10
2	16	Guillaume Bianchi (ITA)	V		V	V	V	V	V	6	6	1.000	30	17	13	1	6
3	24	Askar Khamzin (RUS)	D_{3}	D_{3}		V	D_{1}	V	V	3	6	0.500	22	18	4	4	30
4	37	Leong Cheng Wai (MAC)	D_{0}	D_{2}	D_{1}		D_{0}	D_{3}	D_{0}	0	6	0.000	6	30	–24	7	66
5	44	Maxime Tarasiewicz (POL)	D_{3}	D_{3}	V	V		V	V	4	6	0.667	26	18	8	3	22
6	57	Ravi Sharma (IND)	D_{1}	D_{4}	D_{0}	V	D_{4}		D_{2}	1	6	0.167	16	28	–12	6	58
7	65	Pavel Tychler (RSA)	D_{2}	D_{1}	D_{2}	V	D_{3}	V		2	6	0.333	18	22	–4	5	45

=== Pool 5 ===
#	Seed	Athlete	1	2	3	4	5	6	7	V#	M#	Ind.	TG	TR	Diff.	RP	RT
1	5	Alessandro Paroli (ITA)		D_{3}	V	V	V	V	V	5	6	0.833	28	12	16	1	9
2	17	Ryan Choi Chun Yin (HKG)	V		V_{4}	V	V	D_{4}	V	5	6	0.833	28	13	15	2	11
3	25	Jakub Surwillo (POL)	D_{1}	D_{3}		V	D_{2}	D_{4}	V	2	6	0.333	20	26	–6	5	49
4	36	Josef Rizell (SWE)	D_{3}	D_{1}	D_{3}		D_{2}	D_{3}	V	1	6	0.167	17	27	–10	6	55
5	45	Mateo Pettinato (ARG)	D_{1}	D_{1}	V	V		D_{3}	D_{4}	2	6	0.333	19	24	–5	4	46
6	56	Pylyp Kolesnikov (UKR)	D_{2}	V	V	V	V		V	5	6	0.833	27	23	4	3	18
7	64	Arjun Arjun (IND)	D_{0}	D_{0}	D_{4}	D_{2}	V	D_{4}		1	6	0.167	15	29	–14	7	61

=== Pool 6 ===
#	Seed	Athlete	1	2	3	4	5	6	7	V#	M#	Ind.	TG	TR	Diff.	RP	RT
1	6	Daniel Dosa (HUN)		V	V	V	V	V	V	6	6	1.000	30	14	16	1	4
2	15	Lee Kwang-hyun (KOR)	D_{3}		D_{4}	V	V	V	V	4	6	0.667	27	15	12	2	20
3	26	Cedrik Serri (SVK)	D_{3}	V		D_{3}	V	V	D_{2}	3	6	0.500	23	21	2	3	33
4	35	Jerry Chang (USA)	D_{1}	D_{2}	V		V	V	D_{4}	3	6	0.500	22	22	0	5	36
5	46	Zhang Zhenggang (SGP)	D_{2}	D_{2}	D_{2}	D_{3}		V	V	2	6	0.333	19	24	–5	6	46
6	55	Aristofanis Stavrou (GRE)	D_{2}	D_{1}	D_{0}	D_{1}	D_{0}		D_{0}	0	6	0.000	4	30	–26	7	67
7	66	Wu Junhao (CHN)	D_{3}	D_{0}	V	V	D_{4}	V		3	6	0.500	22	21	1	4	34

=== Pool 7 ===
#	Seed	Athlete	1	2	3	4	5	6	7	V#	M#	Ind.	TG	TR	Diff.	RP	RT
1	7	Alex Tofalides (CYP)		D_{3}	V	V	V	V	D_{3}	4	6	0.667	26	15	11	3	21
2	14	Klod Yunes (UKR)	V		V	D_{1}	V	V	V	5	6	0.833	26	17	9	2	15
3	27	Lukas Teteris (LAT)	D_{0}	D_{2}		D_{2}	D_{4}	V	V	2	6	0.333	18	23	–5	5	48
4	34	Alexander Sirotkin (RUS)	D_{1}	V	V		V	V	V	5	6	0.833	26	13	13	1	13
5	47	Boldizsár Balogh (HUN)	D_{3}	D_{4}	V	D_{2}		V	V	3	6	0.500	24	22	2	4	32
6	54	Bradley Johnston Leyer (CRC)	D_{1}	D_{1}	D_{2}	D_{3}	D_{2}		D_{1}	0	6	0.000	10	30	–20	7	65
7	67	Lenin Meetei Lairellakpam (IND)	V	D_{2}	D_{1}	D_{0}	D_{1}	V		2	6	0.333	14	24	–10	6	51

=== Pool 8 ===
#	Seed	Athlete	1	2	3	4	5	6	7	V#	M#	Ind.	TG	TR	Diff.	RP	RT
1	8	Francesco Trani (ITA)		V	V	V	V	V	V	6	6	1.000	30	10	20	1	2
2	13	Alexandre Sido (FRA)	D_{2}		V	V	V	V	D_{4}	4	6	0.667	26	19	7	2	24
3	28	Nicolas Marino (ARG)	D_{0}	D_{3}		D_{2}	D_{2}	V	V	2	6	0.333	17	28	–11	5	52
4	33	Howie Chan Ho Yin (HKG)	D_{2}	D_{1}	V		V	V	V	4	6	0.667	23	20	3	3	26
5	48	Maykl Hovhannesyan (ARM)	D_{2}	D_{2}	V	D_{3}		V	V	3	6	0.500	22	24	–2	4	37
6	53	Wu Zhuosheng (CHN)	D_{4}	D_{3}	D_{4}	D_{3}	D_{4}		V	1	6	0.167	23	28	–5	6	54
7	68	Christian James Lim Wei Rong (SGP)	D_{0}	V	D_{4}	D_{2}	D_{3}	D_{3}		1	6	0.167	17	29	–12	7	57

=== Pool 9 ===
#	Seed	Athlete	1	2	3	4	5	6	7	V#	M#	Ind.	TG	TR	Diff.	RP	RT
1	9	Edoardo Luperi (ITA)		V	V	D_{2}	V	V	V	5	6	0.833	27	10	17	1	8
2	12	Henrique Marques (BRA)	D_{0}		V	V	V	V	V	5	6	0.833	25	16	9	2	16
3	29	Kevin Chan Jerrold (SGP)	D_{3}	D_{4}		D_{2}	D_{3}	V	V	2	6	0.333	22	25	–3	5	43
4	32	Philip Shin (USA)	V	D_{2}	V		D_{3}	V	V	4	6	0.667	25	18	7	3	25
5	49	Jose Charreu (POR)	D_{1}	D_{1}	V	V		V	D_{3}	3	6	0.500	20	22	–2	4	39
6	52	Megat Zuhril Megat Zariman (MAS)	D_{0}	D_{3}	D_{3}	D_{2}	D_{1}		V	1	6	0.167	14	26	–12	6	59
7	69	Lovro Fijavz Bacovnik (SLO)	D_{1}	D_{1}	D_{2}	D_{2}	V	D_{1}		1	6	0.167	12	28	–16	7	62

=== Pool 10 ===
#	Seed	Athlete	1	2	3	4	5	6	V#	M#	Ind.	TG	TR	Diff.	RP	RT
1	10	Maximilien Chastanet (FRA)		D_{1}	V	D_{2}	D_{4}	V	2	5	0.400	17	20	–3	4	41
2	11	Dmytro Chuchukalo (UKR)	V		V	V	V	V	5	5	1.00	25	10	15	1	5
3	30	Mate Hari (HUN)	D_{4}	D_{2}		D_{2}	D_{3}	V	1	5	0.200	16	21	–5	5	53
4	31	Bartosz Cegielski (POL)	V	D_{0}	V		D_{2}	V	3	5	0.600	17	16	1	3	28
5	50	Choi Hyun-soo (KOR)	V	D_{4}	V	V		V	4	5	0.800	24	15	9	2	19
6	51	Jason Chang (USA)	D_{1}	D_{3}	D_{1}	D_{2}	D_{1}		0	5	0.000	8	25	–17	6	63

== Ranking Round ==
=== Section 1 ===
Round of 64
26	Cedrik Serri (SVK)	15
47	Boldizsár Balogh (HUN)	4
3	Takahiro Shikine (JPN)	15
27	Lukas Teteris (LAT)	5
25	Jakub Surwillo (POL)	14
12	Henrique Marques (BRA)	15
10	Maximilien Chastanet (FRA)	15
13	Alexandre Sido (FRA)	11
32	Philip Shin (USA)	13
19	Andras Nemeth (HUN)	15

Round of 32
2	Toshiya Saito (JPN)	15
26	Cedrik Serri (SVK)	10
3	Takahiro Shikine (JPN)	15
12	Henrique Marques (BRA)	8
5	Alessandro Paroli (ITA)	15
10	Maximilien Chastanet (FRA)	12
19	Andras Nemeth (HUN)	7
9	Edoardo Luperi (ITA)	15

Round of 16
2	Toshiya Saito (JPN)	15
3	Takahiro Shikine (JPN)	14
5	Alessandro Paroli (ITA)	15
9	Edoardo Luperi (ITA)	11

Quarterfinal
2	Toshiya Saito (JPN)	10
5	Alessandro Paroli (ITA)	15

=== Section 2 ===
Round of 64
48	Maykl Hovhannesyan (ARM)	6
31	Bartosz Cegielski (POL)	15
7	Alex Tofalides (CYP)	15
29	Kevin Chan Jerrold (SGP)	6
45	Pavel Tychler (RSA)	5
20	Lee Kwang-hyun (KOR)	15
29	Grigoriy Semenyuk (RUS)	15
36	Jerry Chang (USA)	8

Round of 32
11	Dmytro Chuchukalo (UKR)	15
31	Bartosz Cegielski (POL)	9
7	Alex Tofalides (CYP)	15
43	Iskander Akhmetov (RUS)	13
34	Alexander Sirotkin (RUS)	15
20	Lee Kwang-hyun (KOR)	9
29	Grigoriy Semenyuk (RUS)	15
4	Daniel Dosa (HUN)	8

Round of 16
11	Dmytro Chuchukalo (UKR)	15
7	Alex Tofalides (CYP)	14
34	Alexander Sirotkin (RUS)	15
29	Grigoriy Semenyuk (RUS)	8

Quarterfinal
11	Dmytro Chuchukalo (UKR)	15
34	Alexander Sirotkin (RUS)	10

=== Section 3 ===
Round of 64
23	Christopher Nagle (AUS)	8
24	Askar Khamzin (RUS)	15
50	Choi Hyun-soo (KOR)	15
46	Zhang Zhenggang (SGP)	6
22	Rostyslav Hertsyk (UKR)	15
18	Maxime Tarasiewicz (POL)	8
33	Howie Chan Ho Yin (HKG)	5
21	Ryohei Noguchi (JPN)	15

Round of 32
3	Ha Tae-gyu (KOR)	15
24	Askar Khamzin (RUS)	12
50	Choi Hyun-soo (KOR)	15
61	Lee Young-hoon (KOR)	8
17	Ryan Choi Chun Yin (HKG)	11
22	Rostyslav Hertsyk (UKR)	15
21	Ryohei Noguchi (JPN)	15
16	Guillaume Bianchi (ITA)	11

Round of 16
3	Ha Tae-gyu (KOR)	14
50	Choi Hyun-soo (KOR)	15
22	Rostyslav Hertsyk (UKR)	15
21	Ryohei Noguchi (JPN)	6

Quarterfinal
50	Choi Hyun-soo (KOR)	5
22	Rostyslav Hertsyk (UKR)	15

=== Section 4 ===
Round of 64
49	Jose Charreu (POR)	10
42	Stef de Greef (BEL)	15
62	David Hadler (TPE)	15
38	Pedro Macedo (POR)	8
14	Klod Yunes (UKR)	15
40	O Chun Yee (HKG)	7
45	Mateo Pettinato (ARG)	15
56	Pylyp Kolesnikov (UKR)	11
20	Erwann Auclin (FRA)	13
66	Wu Junhao (CHN)	15

Round of 32
18	Maxime Pauty (FRA)	15
42	Stef de Greef (BEL)	10
62	David Hadler (TPE)	6
4	Kyosuke Matsuyama (JPN)	15
14	Klod Yunes (UKR)	15
45	Mateo Pettinato (ARG)	8
66	Wu Junhao (CHN)	2
8	Francesco Trani (ITA)	15

Round of 16
18	Maxime Pauty (FRA)	13
4	Kyosuke Matsuyama (JPN)	15
14	Klod Yunes (UKR)	15
8	Francesco Trani (ITA)	14

Quarterfinal
4	Kyosuke Matsuyama (JPN)	15
14	Klod Yunes (UKR)	9

=== Quarterfinals ===
Quarterfinals
2	Toshiya Saito (JPN)	10
5	Alessandro Paroli (ITA)	15
11	Dmytro Chuchukalo (UKR)	15
34	Alexander Sirotkin (RUS)	10
50	Choi Hyun-soo (KOR)	5
22	Rostyslav Hertsyk (UKR)	15
4	Kyosuke Matsuyama (JPN)	15
14	Klod Yunes (UKR)	9

Semifinals
5	Alessandro Paroli (ITA)	13
11	Dmytro Chuchukalo (UKR)	15
22	Rostyslav Hertsyk (UKR)	6
4	Kyosuke Matsuyama (JPN)	15

Final
11	Dmytro Chuchukalo (UKR)	15
4	Kyosuke Matsuyama (JPN)	14

== Final ranking ==
Rank	Athlete	Results
1st place, gold medalist(s)	Dmytro Chuchukalo (UKR)	Champion
2nd place, silver medalist(s)	Kyosuke Matsuyama (JPN)	Runner-up
3rd place, bronze medalist(s)	Alessandro Paroli (ITA)	Semifinals
3rd place, bronze medalist(s)	Rostyslav Hertsyk (UKR)	Semifinals
5	Toshiya Saito (JPN)	Quarterfinals
6	Alexander Sirotkin (RUS)	Quarterfinals
7	Klod Yunes (UKR)	Quarterfinals
8	Choi Hyun-soo (KOR)	Quarterfinals
9	Francesco Trani (ITA)	Round of 16
10	Ha Yae-gyu (KOR)	Round of 16
11	Maxime Pauty (FRA)	Round of 16
12	Edoardo Luperi (ITA)	Round of 16
13	Takahiro Shikine (JPN)	Round of 16
14	Alex Tofalides (CYP)	Round of 16
15	Grigoriy Semenyuk (RUS)	Round of 16
16	Ryohei Noguchi (JPN)	Round of 16
17	Daniel Dosa (HUN)	Round of 32
18	Guillaume Bianchi (ITA)	Round of 32
19	Ryan Choi Chun Yin (HKG)	Round of 32
20	Iskander Akhmetov (RUS)	Round of 32
21	Lee Young-hoon (KOR)	Round of 32
22	Henrique Marques (BRA)	Round of 32
23	Lee Kwang-hyun (KOR)	Round of 32
24	David Hadler (TPE)	Round of 32
25	Stef de Greef (BEL)	Round of 32
26	Bartosz Segielski (POL)	Round of 32
27	Askar Khamzin (RUS)	Round of 32
28	Cedrik Serri (SVK)	Round of 32
29	Wu Junhao (CHN)	Round of 32
30	Andras Nemeth (HUN)	Round of 32
31	Maximilien Chastanet (FRA)	Round of 32
32	Mateo Pettinato (ARG)	Round of 32
33	Pylyp Kolesnikov (UKR)	Round of 64
34	Maxime Tarasiewicz (POL)	Round of 64
35	Alexandre Sido (FRA)	Round of 64
36	Philip Shin (USA)	Round of 64
37	Howie Chan Ho Yin (HKG)	Round of 64
38	Erwann Auclin (FRA)	Round of 64
39	Boldizsár Balogh (HUN)	Round of 64
40	Christopher Nagle (AUS)	Round of 64
41	Jerry Chang (USA)	Round of 64
42	Maykl Hovhannesyan (ARM)	Round of 64
43	Jose Charreu (POR)	Round of 64
44	Pedro Macedo (POR)	Round of 64
45	Kevin Chan Jerrold (SGP)	Round of 64
46	Pavel Tychler (RSA)	Round of 64
47	Zhang Zhenggang (SGP)	Round of 64
48	Lukas Teteris (LAT)	Round of 64
49	Jakub Surwillo (POL)	Round of 64
50	O Chun Yee (HKG)	Round of 64
51	Lenin Meetei Lairellakpam (IND)	Round of Pools
52	Nicolas Marino (ARG)	Round of Pools
53	Mate Hari (HUN)	Round of Pools
54	Wu Zhuosheng (CHN)	Round of Pools
55	Josef Rizell (SWE)	Round of Pools
55	Ludwik De Bazelaire (POL)	Round of Pools
57	Christian James Lim Wei Rong (SGP)	Round of Pools
58	Ravi Sharma (IND)	Round of Pools
59	Megat Zuhril Megat Zariman (MAS)	Round of Pools
59	Niv Gross (ISR)	Round of Pools
61	Arjun Arjun (IND)	Round of Pools
62	Lovro Fijavz Bacovnik (SLO)	Round of Pools
63	Jason Chang (USA)	Round of Pools
64	Zhang Yu (CHN)	Round of Pools
65	Bradley Johnston Leyer (CRC)	Round of Pools
66	Leong Cheng Wai (MAC)	Round of Pools
67	Aristofanis Stavrou (GRE)	Round of Pools
68	Singh Sarbjeet (IND)	Round of Pools
69	Sanjeep Lama (NEP)	Round of Pools
