= Fencing at the 2017 Summer Universiade – Men's team foil =

Men's team foil at the XXIX Summer Universiade
- Venues: Taipei Nangang Exhibition Center
- Dates: 25 August 2017
- Competitors: 51 from 14 nations

Medalists
1st place, gold medalist(s)		Kyosuke Matsuyama; Toshiya Saito; Takahiro Shikine; Ryohei Noguchi	Japan
2nd place, silver medalist(s)		Alexander Sirotkin; Grigoriy Semenyuk; Iskander Akhmetov; Askar Khamzin	Russia
3rd place, bronze medalist(s)		Alessandro Paroli; Francesco Trani; Edoardo Luperi; Guillaume Bianchi	Italy

The men's team foil fencing event at the 2017 Summer Universiade was held 25 August at the Taipei Nangang Exhibition Center in Taipei, Taiwan.

== Seeds ==
Since the number of individual épée event participants were 69, 70 was the added number on those who did not participate in the individual event.

Tournament Seeding	Team	Name	RI
1 (11)	Ukraine	Dmytro Chuchukalo	1
1 (11)	Ukraine	Rostyslav Hertsyk	3
1 (11)	Ukraine	Klod Yunes	7
1 (11)	Ukraine	Pylyp Kolesnikov	33
2 (20)	Japan	Kyosuke Matsuyama	2
2 (20)	Japan	Toshiya Saito	5
2 (20)	Japan	Takahiro Shikine	13
2 (20)	Japan	Ryohei Noguchi	16
3 (24)	Italy	Alessandro Paroli	3
3 (24)	Italy	Francesco Trani	9
3 (24)	Italy	Edoardo Luperi	12
3 (24)	Italy	Guillaume Bianchi	18
4 (39)	South Korea	Choi Hyun-soo	8
4 (39)	South Korea	Ha Yae-gyu	10
4 (39)	South Korea	Lee Young-hoon	21
4 (39)	South Korea	Lee Kwang-hyun	23
5 (41)	Russia	Alexander Sirotkin	6
5 (41)	Russia	Grigoriy Semenyuk	15
5 (41)	Russia	Iskander Akhmetov	20
5 (41)	Russia	Askar Khamzin	27
6 (77)	France	Maxime Pauty	11
6 (77)	France	Maximilien Chastanet	31
6 (77)	France	Alexandre Sido	35
6 (77)	France	Erwann Auclin	38
7 (86)	Hungary	Daniel Dosa	17
7 (86)	Hungary	Andras Nemeth	30
7 (86)	Hungary	Boldizsár Balogh	39
7 (86)	Hungary	Mate Hari	53
8 (106)	Hong Kong	Ryan Choi Chun Yin	19
8 (106)	Hong Kong	Howie Chan Ho Yin	37
8 (106)	Hong Kong	O Chun Yee|	50
9 (109)	Poland	Bartosz Segielski	26
9 (109)	Poland	Maxime Tarasiewicz	34
9 (109)	Poland	Jakub Surwillo	49
9 (109)	Poland	Ludwik De Bazelaire	55
10 (140)	United States	Philip Shin	36
10 (140)	United States	Jerry Chang	41
10 (140)	United States	Jason Chang	63
11 (147)	China	Wu Junhao	29
11 (147)	China	Wu Zhuosheng	54
11 (147)	China	Zhang Yu	64
12 (154)	Argentina	Mateo Pettinato	32
12 (154)	Argentina	Nicolas Marino	52
12 (154)	Argentina	Stefano Ivan Lucchetti	70
13 (170)	India	Lenin Meetei Lairellakpam	51
13 (170)	India	Ravi Sharma	58
13 (170)	India	Arjun Arjun	61
13 (170)	India	Singh Sarbjeet	68
14 (174)	Singapore	Zhang Zhenggang	47
14 (174)	Singapore	Christian James Lim Wei Rong	57
14 (174)	Singapore	Ip Yuan Chang	70

== Ranking Round ==
Round of 16
9	Poland	38
8	Hong Kong	45
5	Russia	45
12	Argentina	18
13	India	20
4	South Korea	45
3	Italy	45
14	Singapore	21
11	China	25
6	France	45
7	Hungary	45
10	United States	42

Quarterfinals
1	Ukraine	45
8	Hong Kong	27
5	Russia	42
4	South Korea	41
3	Italy	45
6	France	41
7	Hungary	39
2	Japan	45

Semifinals
1	Ukraine	42
5	Russia	45
3	Italy	30
2	Japan	45

Final
5	Russia	38
2	Japan	45

=== Bronze Medal ===
Third place
1	Ukraine	24
3	Italy	45

== Final ranking ==
Rank	Team	Results
1st place, gold medalist(s)	Japan	Champion
2nd place, silver medalist(s)	Russia	Runner-up
3rd place, bronze medalist(s)	Italy	Third place
4	Ukraine	Semifinals
5	South Korea	Quarterfinals
6	France	Quarterfinals
7	Hungary	Quarterfinals
8	Hong Kong	Quarterfinals
9	Poland	Round of 16
10	United States	Round of 16
11	China	Round of 16
12	Argentina	Round of 16
13	India	Round of 16
14	Singapore	Round of 16
