= Men's foil at the 2023 World Fencing Championships =

- Venue: Milan Convention Center
- Location: Milan, Italy
- Dates: 24 July (qualification); 27 July (final)

Medalists
gold medal	Tommaso Marini	Italy
silver medal	Nick Itkin	United States
bronze medal	Kyosuke Matsuyama	Japan
bronze medal	Enzo Lefort	France

The Men's foil competition at the 2023 World Fencing Championships was held on 27 July 2023. The qualification was held on 24 July.

== Draw ==
=== Finals ===
Semifinals
(United States) Nick Itkin	15
(Japan) Kyosuke Matsuyama	10
(Italy) Tommaso Marini	15
(France) Enzo Lefort	13

Final
(United States) Nick Itkin	13
(Italy) Tommaso Marini	15

=== Top half ===
==== Section 1 ====
Round of 64
(United States) Alexander Massialas	15
(Austria) Maximilian Ettelt	12
(Ukraine) Andrii Pogrebniak	9
(Spain) Carlos Llavador	15
(South Korea) Ha Tae-gyu	15
(Uzbekistan) Doniyor Sadullaev	5
(Slovakia) Cedrik Serri	6
(Hungary) Dániel Dósa	15
(Egypt) Alaaeldin Abouelkassem	13
(Hong Kong) Ryan Choi	15
(Belgium) Stef De Greef	15
(Brazil) Guilherme Toldo	11
(China) Mo Ziwei	15
(Poland) Michał Siess	9
(Japan) Yudai Nagano	6
(United States) Nick Itkin	15

Round of 32
(United States) Alexander Massialas	11
(Spain) Carlos Llavador	15
(South Korea) Ha Tae-gyu	12
(Hungary) Dániel Dósa	15
(Hong Kong) Ryan Choi	15
(Belgium) Stef De Greef	4
(China) Mo Ziwei	7
(United States) Nick Itkin	15

Round of 16
(Spain) Carlos Llavador	15
(Hungary) Dániel Dósa	13
(Hong Kong) Ryan Choi	10
(United States) Nick Itkin	15

Quarterfinals
(Spain) Carlos Llavador	8
(United States) Nick Itkin	15

==== Section 2 ====
Round of 64
(Hong Kong) Cheung Ka Long	15
(South Korea) Lee Kwang-hyun	11
(Chinese Taipei) Chen Yi-tung	8
(Hungary) Gergő Szemes	15
(Israel) Raz Goren	7
(France) Alexandre Ediri	15
(Ukraine) Ievgen Lazarenko	3
(Czech Republic) Alexander Choupenitch	15
(Japan) Kyosuke Matsuyama	15
(Brazil) Pedro Marostega	4
(Hong Kong) Nicholas Choi	5
(Japan) Kazuki Iimura	15
(Egypt) Abdelrahman Tolba	15
(Egypt) Mohamed Hassan	9
(Cyprus) Alex Tofalides	8
(Italy) Alessio Foconi	15

Round of 32
(Hong Kong) Cheung Ka Long	15
(Hungary) Gergő Szemes	10
(France) Alexandre Ediri	8
(Czech Republic) Alexander Choupenitch	15
(Japan) Kyosuke Matsuyama	15
(Japan) Kazuki Iimura	7
(Egypt) Abdelrahman Tolba	15
(Italy) Alessio Foconi	8

Round of 16
(Hong Kong) Cheung Ka Long	15
(Czech Republic) Alexander Choupenitch	8
(Japan) Kyosuke Matsuyama	15
(Egypt) Abdelrahman Tolba	13

Quarterfinals
(Hong Kong) Cheung Ka Long	14
(Japan) Kyosuke Matsuyama	15

=== Bottom half ===
==== Section 3 ====
Round of 64
(United States) Gerek Meinhardt	11
(South Korea) Heo Jun	15
(Malaysia) Hans Yoong	10
(United Kingdom) Kristjan Archer	15
(France) Rafael Savin	15
(South Korea) Im Cheol-woo	9
(Chinese Taipei) Chen Chih-chieh	14
(France) Maxime Pauty	15
(Italy) Filippo Macchi	15
(Israel) Ori Finsterbush	3
(Mexico) Diego Cervantes	12
(Austria) Moritz Lechner	15
(Japan) Takahiro Shikine	15
(Croatia) Borna Špoljar	6
(Germany) Paul Luca Faul	8
(Italy) Tommaso Marini	15

Round of 32
(South Korea) Heo Jun	13
(United Kingdom) Kristjan Archer	14
(France) Rafael Savin	15
(France) Maxime Pauty	14
(Italy) Filippo Macchi	15
(Austria) Moritz Lechner	14
(Japan) Takahiro Shikine	4
(Italy) Tommaso Marini	15

Round of 16
(United Kingdom) Kristjan Archer	9
(France) Rafael Savin	15
(Italy) Filippo Macchi	11
(Italy) Tommaso Marini	15

Quarterfinals
(France) Rafael Savin	9
(Italy) Tommaso Marini	15

==== Section 4 ====
Round of 64
(Egypt) Mohamed Hamza	15
(Poland) Leszek Rajski	5
(Germany) Alexander Kahl	13
(Canada) Maximilien Van Haaster	15
(United Kingdom) Jaimie Cook	13
(Denmark) Jonas Winterberg-Poulsen	15
(Ukraine) Klod Yunes	8
(Italy) Daniele Garozzo	15
(United States) Miles Chamley-Watson	15
(Hong Kong) Yeung Chi Ka	7
(Poland) Andrzej Rządkowski	14
(China) Chen Haiwei	15
(United Kingdom) Marcus Mepstead	15
(Canada) Blake Brozus	7
(China) Xu Jie	6
(France) Enzo Lefort	15

Round of 32
(Egypt) Mohamed Hamza	15
(Canada) Maximilien Van Haaster	6
(Denmark) Jonas Winterberg-Poulsen	15
(Italy) Daniele Garozzo	11
(United States) Miles Chamley-Watson	15
(China) Chen Haiwei	4
(United Kingdom) Marcus Mepstead	3
(France) Enzo Lefort	15

Round of 16
(Egypt) Mohamed Hamza	15
(Denmark) Jonas Winterberg-Poulsen	12
(United States) Miles Chamley-Watson	5
(France) Enzo Lefort	15

Quarterfinals
(Egypt) Mohamed Hamza	14
(France) Enzo Lefort	15
