= Fencing at the 2026 Asian Games – Men's team foil =

Men's team foil at the 2026 Asian Games
- Venue: Aichi Sky Expo Hall F
- Date: 25 September 2026
- Competitors: 48 from 13 nations

Medalists
gold medal	Japan; Shunsuke Baba, Kazuki Iimura, Kyosuke Matsuyama, Toshiya Saito
silver medal	Hong Kong; Cheung Ka Long, Choi Chun Yin Ryan, Ho Shing Him Harris, Leung Chin Yu
bronze medal	China; Lyu Weiqiao, Xu Jie, Zeng Zhaoran
bronze medal	South Korea; Im Cheol-woo, Kim Tae-hwan, Lee Kwang-hyun, Youn Jeong-hyun

The men's team foil competition at the 2026 Asian Games in Nagoya was held on 25 September 2026 at the Aichi Sky Expo Hall F. Host nation Japan defeated Hong Kong, China 45–36 in the final to win the gold medal. China and South Korea shared the bronze medals.

== Schedule ==
All times are Japan Standard Time (UTC+09:00)

Date	Time	Event
Friday, 25 September 2026	9:30	Table of 16
Friday, 25 September 2026	11:50	Quarterfinals
Friday, 25 September 2026	14:20	Semifinals
Friday, 25 September 2026	18:20	Gold medal match

== Seeding ==
The teams were seeded taking into account the results achieved by competitors representing each team in the individual event.

Rank	Team	Fencer		Total
Rank	Team	1	2	Total
1	Japan (JPN)	1	3	4
2	South Korea (KOR)	3	5	8
3	Uzbekistan (UZB)	7	8	15
4	China (CHN)	9	10	19
5	Singapore (SGP)	6	18	24
6	Hong Kong (HKG)	2	23	25
7	Chinese Taipei (TPE)	12	13	25
8	Kazakhstan (KAZ)	13	15	28
9	Qatar (QAT)	11	22	33
10	Macau (MAC)	17	21	38
11	India (IND)	19	20	39
12	Oman (OMA)	29	34	63
13	Pakistan (PAK)	32	36	68

== Results ==
Table of 16
9	Qatar	42
8	Kazakhstan	45
5	Singapore	45
12	Oman	19
13	Pakistan	12
4	China	45
11	India	27
6	Hong Kong	45
7	Chinese Taipei	45
10	Macau	32

Quarterfinals
1	Japan	45
8	Kazakhstan	29
5	Singapore	27
4	China	45
3	Uzbekistan	33
6	Hong Kong	45
7	Chinese Taipei	37
2	South Korea	45

Semifinals
1	Japan	45
4	China	43
6	Hong Kong	45
2	South Korea	41

Gold medal match
1	Japan	45
6	Hong Kong	36

== Final standing ==
Rank	Team
1st place, gold medalist(s)	Japan (JPN); Shunsuke Baba; Kazuki Iimura; Kyosuke Matsuyama; Toshiya Saito
2nd place, silver medalist(s)	Hong Kong (HKG); Cheung Ka Long; Choi Chun Yin Ryan; Ho Shing Him Harris; Leung Chin Yu
3rd place, bronze medalist(s)	China (CHN); Lyu Weiqiao; Xu Jie; Zeng Zhaoran
3rd place, bronze medalist(s)	South Korea (KOR); Im Cheol-woo; Kim Tae-hwan; Lee Kwang-hyun; Youn Jeong-hyun
5	Uzbekistan (UZB); Daniil Kravtsov; Radmir Semeneev; Ulugbek Usmanov
6	Singapore (SGP); Zephaniah Ian Kiew; Keyon Loo; Elijah Robson Samuel; Raphael Juan Kang Tan
7	Chinese Taipei (TPE); Chen Chih-Chieh; Chen Yi-Tung; Hsu Sheng-Hung; Kuo Chun-You
8	Kazakhstan (KAZ); Tamirlan Kaliyev; Galim Nurumov; Timofey Semyonov
9	Qatar (QAT); Khaled Hussein; Abdalla Khalifa; Ali Owaida; Abdulrahman Poorgharib
10	Macau (MAC); Cheong Chong Kio; Lam Pak Kio; Leong Chit Seong; Wu Chong Him
11	India (IND); Aditya; Tejas Manoj Patil; Sachin; Hemash Singh Sanasam
12	Oman (OMA); Ammar Al Azizi; Saeed Al Shuaibi; Ahmed Keskes
13	Pakistan (PAK); Baryal Khan; Muhammad Yaseen Khan; Abdul Musawir; Muhammad Waqas
