= Fencing at the 2026 Asian Games – Men's individual foil =

Men's individual foil at the 2026 Asian Games
- Venue: Aichi Sky Expo Hall F
- Date: 22 September 2026
- Competitors: 36 from 20 nations

Medalists
gold medal	Kazuki Iimura	Japan
silver medal	Choi Chun Yin Ryan	Hong Kong
bronze medal	Youn Jeong-hyun	South Korea
bronze medal	Kyosuke Matsuyama	Japan

The men's individual foil competition at the 2026 Asian Games in Nagoya was held on 22 September 2026 at the Aichi Sky Expo Hall F. Japan's Kazuki Iimura defeated Choi Chun Yin Ryan of Hong Kong 15–13 in the final to win the gold medal.

== Schedule ==
All times are Japan Standard Time (UTC+09:00)

Date	Time	Event
Tuesday, 22 September 2026	10:00	Round of pools
Tuesday, 22 September 2026	13:30	Table of 32
Tuesday, 22 September 2026	14:30	Table of 16
Tuesday, 22 September 2026	15:30	Quarterfinals
Tuesday, 22 September 2026	17:50	Semifinals
Tuesday, 22 September 2026	19:10	Gold medal bout

== Results ==
=== Round of pools ===
==== Pool 1 ====
Athlete	PHI	JPN	OMA	MAC	SGP	IND
Sammuel Tranquilan (PHI)	—	1–5	5–1	1–5	1–5	2–5
Kazuki Iimura (JPN)	5–1	—	5–1	5–2	5–3	1–5
Saeed Al Shuaibi (OMA)	1–5	1–5	—	1–5	3–5	1–5
Cheong Chong Kio (MAC)	5–1	2–5	5–1	—	5–4	5–2
Raphael Juan Kang Tan (SGP)	5–1	3–5	5–3	4–5	—	5–2
Hemash Singh Sanasam (IND)	5–2	5–1	5–1	2–5	2–5	—

Legend: Blue = left column team win; Red = top row team win.

==== Pool 2 ====
Athlete	INA	TPE	HKG	PHI	UAE	SGP
Aldo Pratama Arjoni (INA)	—	2–5	0–5	5–3	4–5	2–5
Chen Yi-Tung (TPE)	5–2	—	2–5	5–3	5–0	4–5
Choi Chun Yin Ryan (HKG)	5–0	5–2	—	5–0	5–3	5–3
Nathaniel Perez (PHI)	3–5	3–5	0–5	—	5–2	3–5
Hamed Aljallaf (UAE)	5–4	0–5	3–5	2–5	—	1–5
Elijah Robson Samuel (SGP)	5–2	5–4	3–5	5–3	5–1	—

Legend: Blue = left column team win; Red = top row team win.

==== Pool 3 ====
Athlete	UZB	MAC	THA	HKG	KUW	QAT
Daniil Kravtsov (UZB)	—	5–2	5–2	5–4	5–1	1–5
Lam Pak Kio (MAC)	2–5	—	4–5	5–3	5–4	5–4
Notethakod Wangpaisit (THA)	2–5	5–4	—	4–5	1–5	4–5
Cheung Ka Long (HKG)	4–5	3–5	5–4	—	5–4	4–5
Ali Nassar (KUW)	1–5	4–5	5–1	4–5	—	2–5
Ali Owaida (QAT)	5–1	4–5	5–4	5–4	5–2	—

Legend: Blue = left column team win; Red = top row team win.

==== Pool 4 ====
Athlete	KUW	KGZ	UAE	UZB	JPN	CHN
Abdulwahab Mohammad (KUW)	—	5–3	5–2	3–5	0–5	3–5
Tim Abramkin (KGZ)	3–5	—	1–5	5–4	1–5	0–5
Faris Alblooshi (UAE)	2–5	5–1	—	3–5	5–4	0–5
Radmir Semeneev (UZB)	5–3	4–5	5–3	—	4–5	3–5
Kyosuke Matsuyama (JPN)	5–0	5–1	4–5	5–4	—	5–3
Xu Jie (CHN)	5–3	5–0	5–0	5–3	3–5	—

Legend: Blue = left column team win; Red = top row team win.

==== Pool 5 ====
Athlete	KAZ	TPE	MGL	KOR	PAK	IND
Galim Nurumov (KAZ)	—	5–3	5–1	2–5	5–1	3–5
Chen Chih-Chieh (TPE)	3–5	—	5–1	4–5	5–2	5–2
Chingis Narmandakh (MGL)	1–5	1–5	—	2–5	2–5	1–5
Youn Jeong-hyun (KOR)	5–2	5–4	5–2	—	5–1	5–0
Baryal Khan (PAK)	1–5	2–5	5–2	1–5	—	0–5
Sachin (IND)	5–3	2–5	5–1	0–5	5–0	—

Legend: Blue = left column team win; Red = top row team win.

==== Pool 6 ====
Athlete	KOR	KAZ	CHN	OMA	QAT	PAK
Lee Kwang-hyun (KOR)	—	5–2	5–2	5–2	5–1	5–0
Timofey Semyonov (KAZ)	2–5	—	4–5	5–1	5–3	5–1
Zeng Zhaoran (CHN)	2–5	5–4	—	5–1	5–2	5–0
Ahmed Keskes (OMA)	2–5	1–5	1–5	—	1–5	5–0
Abdulrahman Poorgharib (QAT)	1–5	3–5	2–5	5–1	—	5–0
Muhammad Yaseen Khan (PAK)	0–5	1–5	0–5	0–5	0–5	—

Legend: Blue = left column team win; Red = top row team win.

==== Summary ====
Rank	Pool	Athlete	W	L	W/M	TD	TF
1	6	Lee Kwang-hyun (KOR)	5	0	1.000	+18	25
2	2	Choi Chun Yin Ryan (HKG)	5	0	1.000	+17	25
3	5	Youn Jeong-hyun (KOR)	5	0	1.000	+16	25
4	4	Xu Jie (CHN)	4	1	0.800	+12	23
5	4	Kyosuke Matsuyama (JPN)	4	1	0.800	+11	24
6	6	Zeng Zhaoran (CHN)	4	1	0.800	+10	22
7	1	Cheong Chong Kio (MAC)	4	1	0.800	+9	22
8	1	Kazuki Iimura (JPN)	4	1	0.800	+9	21
9	3	Ali Owaida (QAT)	4	1	0.800	+8	24
10	2	Elijah Robson Samuel (SGP)	4	1	0.800	+8	23
11	3	Daniil Kravtsov (UZB)	4	1	0.800	+7	21
12	5	Chen Chih-Chieh (TPE)	3	2	0.600	+7	22
13	1	Raphael Juan Kang Tan (SGP)	3	2	0.600	+6	22
14	2	Chen Yi-Tung (TPE)	3	2	0.600	+6	21
14	6	Timofey Semyonov (KAZ)	3	2	0.600	+6	21
16	5	Galim Nurumov (KAZ)	3	2	0.600	+5	20
17	1	Hemash Singh Sanasam (IND)	3	2	0.600	+5	19
18	5	Sachin (IND)	3	2	0.600	+3	17
19	3	Lam Pak Kio (MAC)	3	2	0.600	+0	21
20	4	Radmir Semeneev (UZB)	2	3	0.400	+0	21
21	6	Abdulrahman Poorgharib (QAT)	2	3	0.400	+0	16
22	3	Cheung Ka Long (HKG)	2	3	0.400	−2	21
23	4	Abdulwahab Mohammad (KUW)	2	3	0.400	−4	16
24	4	Faris Alblooshi (UAE)	2	3	0.400	−5	15
25	3	Ali Nassar (KUW)	1	4	0.200	−5	16
26	3	Notethakod Wangpaisit (THA)	1	4	0.200	−8	16
27	2	Nathaniel Perez (PHI)	1	4	0.200	−8	14
28	2	Aldo Pratama Arjoni (INA)	1	4	0.200	−10	13
29	6	Ahmed Keskes (OMA)	1	4	0.200	−10	10
30	1	Sammuel Tranquilan (PHI)	1	4	0.200	−11	10
31	2	Hamed Aljallaf (UAE)	1	4	0.200	−13	11
32	5	Baryal Khan (PAK)	1	4	0.200	−13	9
33	4	Tim Abramkin (KGZ)	1	4	0.200	−14	10
34	1	Saeed Al Shuaibi (OMA)	0	5	0.000	−18	7
34	5	Chingis Narmandakh (MGL)	0	5	0.000	−18	7
36	6	Muhammad Yaseen Khan (PAK)	0	5	0.000	−24	1

=== Knockout round ===
==== Final ====
Gold medal bout
1	Kazuki Iimura (JPN)	15
2	Choi Chun Yin Ryan (HKG)	13

==== Top half ====
Table of 32
17	Hemash Singh Sanasam (IND)	9
16	Galim Nurumov (KAZ)	15
9	Ali Owaida (QAT)	15
24	Faris Alblooshi (UAE)	13
25	Ali Nassar (KUW)	5
8	Kazuki Iimura (JPN)	15
5	Kyosuke Matsuyama (JPN)	15
28	Aldo Pratama Arjoni (INA)	4
21	Abdulrahman Poorgharib (QAT)	10
12	Chen Chih-Chieh (TPE)	15
13	Raphael Juan Kang Tan (SGP)	11
20	Radmir Semeneev (UZB)	15
29	Ahmed Keskes (OMA)	3
4	Xu Jie (CHN)	15

Table of 16
1	Lee Kwang-hyun (KOR)	15
16	Galim Nurumov (KAZ)	5
9	Ali Owaida (QAT)	7
8	Kazuki Iimura (JPN)	15
5	Kyosuke Matsuyama (JPN)	15
12	Chen Chih-Chieh (TPE)	13
13	Radmir Semeneev (UZB)	14
4	Xu Jie (CHN)	13

Quarterfinals
1	Lee Kwang-hyun (KOR)	7
8	Kazuki Iimura (JPN)	15
5	Kyosuke Matsuyama (JPN)	15
13	Radmir Semeneev (UZB)	5

Semifinals
1	Kazuki Iimura (JPN)	15
5	Kyosuke Matsuyama (JPN)	8

==== Bottom half ====
Table of 32
19	Lam Pak Kio (MAC)	8
14	Chen Yi-Tung (TPE)	15
11	Daniil Kravtsov (UZB)	15
22	Cheung Ka Long (HKG)	13
27	Nathaniel Perez (PHI)	6
6	Zeng Zhaoran (CHN)	15
7	Cheong Chong Kio (MAC)	13
26	Notethakod Wangpaisit (THA)	15
23	Abdulwahab Mohammad (KUW)	5
10	Elijah Robson Samuel (SGP)	15
15	Timofey Semyonov (KAZ)	15
18	Sachin (IND)	9

Table of 16
3	Youn Jeong-hyun (KOR)	15
14	Chen Yi-Tung (TPE)	4
11	Daniil Kravtsov (UZB)	15
6	Zeng Zhaoran (CHN)	12
7	Notethakod Wangpaisit (THA)	9
10	Elijah Robson Samuel (SGP)	15
15	Timofey Semyonov (KAZ)	4
2	Choi Chun Yin Ryan (HKG)	15

Quarterfinals
3	Youn Jeong-hyun (KOR)	15
11	Daniil Kravtsov (UZB)	5
10	Elijah Robson Samuel (SGP)	12
2	Choi Chun Yin Ryan (HKG)	15

Semifinals
3	Youn Jeong-hyun (KOR)	13
2	Choi Chun Yin Ryan (HKG)	15

== Final standing ==
Rank	Athlete
1st place, gold medalist(s)	Kazuki Iimura (JPN)
2nd place, silver medalist(s)	Choi Chun Yin Ryan (HKG)
3rd place, bronze medalist(s)	Youn Jeong-hyun (KOR)
3rd place, bronze medalist(s)	Kyosuke Matsuyama (JPN)
5	Lee Kwang-hyun (KOR)
6	Elijah Robson Samuel (SGP)
7	Daniil Kravtsov (UZB)
8	Radmir Semeneev (UZB)
9	Xu Jie (CHN)
10	Zeng Zhaoran (CHN)
11	Ali Owaida (QAT)
12	Chen Chih-Chieh (TPE)
13	Chen Yi-Tung (TPE)
13	Timofey Semyonov (KAZ)
15	Galim Nurumov (KAZ)
16	Notethakod Wangpaisit (THA)
17	Cheong Chong Kio (MAC)
18	Raphael Juan Kang Tan (SGP)
19	Hemash Singh Sanasam (IND)
20	Sachin (IND)
21	Lam Pak Kio (MAC)
22	Abdulrahman Poorgharib (QAT)
23	Cheung Ka Long (HKG)
24	Abdulwahab Mohammad (KUW)
25	Faris Alblooshi (UAE)
26	Ali Nassar (KUW)
27	Nathaniel Perez (PHI)
28	Aldo Pratama Arjoni (INA)
29	Ahmed Keskes (OMA)
30	Sammuel Tranquilan (PHI)
31	Hamed Aljallaf (UAE)
32	Baryal Khan (PAK)
33	Tim Abramkin (KGZ)
34	Chingis Narmandakh (MGL)
34	Saeed Al Shuaibi (OMA)
36	Muhammad Yaseen Khan (PAK)
