= Fencing at the 2024 Summer Olympics – Men's team foil =

International sporting competition

Men's team foil at the Games of the XXXIII Olympiad
- Olympic fencing
- Venue: Grand Palais strip
- Date: 4 August 2024
- Competitors: 24 from 8 nations
- Teams: 8

Medalists
1st place, gold medalist(s)		Kyosuke Matsuyama; Takahiro Shikine; Kazuki Iimura; Yudai Nagano	Japan
2nd place, silver medalist(s)		Guillaume Bianchi; Filippo Macchi; Tommaso Marini; Alessio Foconi	Italy
3rd place, bronze medalist(s)		Maximilien Chastanet; Maxime Pauty; Enzo Lefort; Julien Mertine	France

The men's team foil event at the 2024 Summer Olympics took place on 4 August 2024 at the Grand Palais strip. 24 fencers (eight teams of three) from eight nations competed.

== Background ==
This will be the 24th appearance of the event. It was first held in 1904, but omitted in 1908 (when no foil medal events were held) and 1912 (when it was the only one of the six possible men's events not included). The men's team foil returned in 1920 and has been held at every Summer Olympics since 1920 except 2008 (during the time when team events were rotated off the schedule, with only two of the three weapons for each of the men's and women's categories).

France (Erwann Le Péchoux, Enzo Lefort, Maxime Pauty and Julien Mertine) were defending champions, since Le Pechoux has retired, Maximilien Chastanet took Le Pecheaux's spot, but they lost to Japan in the semifinals.

== Qualification ==
A National Olympic Committee (NOC) could enter a team of three fencers in the men's team foil. These fencers also automatically qualified for the individual event.

== Competition format ==
The tournament was a single-elimination tournament, with classification matches for all places. Each match featured the three fencers on each team competing in a round-robin, with nine three-minute bouts to five points; the winning team was the one that reaches 45 total points first or was leading after the end of the nine bouts.

== Schedule ==
The competition was held over a single day.

All times are Central European Summer Time (UTC+2)

Date	Time	Round
Sunday, 4 August 2024	13:00; 16:00; 17:10; 17:10; 20:20; 21:40	Quarterfinals; Semifinals; Classification 7/8; Classification 5/6; Bronze medal match Gold medal match

== Results ==
Quarter-finals
Japan	45
Canada	26
France	45
China	35
United States	45
Egypt	35
Poland	39
Italy	45

Semi-finals
Japan	45
France	37
United States	38
Italy	45

Final
Japan	45
Italy	36
Bronze medal bout
France	45
United States	32

5–8th place classification

5–8th place semifinals
Canada	32
China	45
Egypt	36
Poland	45

Fifth place bout
China	45
Poland	30
Seventh place bout
Canada	45
Egypt	38

== Final classification ==
Rank	Team	Athletes
1st place, gold medalist(s)	Japan	Takahiro Shikine; Kyosuke Matsuyama; Kazuki Iimura; Yudai Nagano
2nd place, silver medalist(s)	Italy	Filippo Macchi; Tommaso Marini; Guillaume Bianchi; Alessio Foconi
3rd place, bronze medalist(s)	France	Maximilien Chastanet; Maxime Pauty; Enzo Lefort; Julien Mertine
4	United States	Nick Itkin; Miles Chamley-Watson; Alexander Massialas; Gerek Meinhardt
5	China	Xu Jie; Mo Ziwei; Wu Bin; Chen Haiwei
6	Poland	Andrzej Rządkowski; Jan Jurkiewicz; Michał Siess; Adrian Wojtkowiak
7	Canada	Bogdan Hamilton; Maximilien Van Haaster; Blake Broszus; Daniel Gu
8	Egypt	Mohamed Essam; Mohamed Hamza; Abdelrahman Tolba; Alaaeldin Abouelkassem
