= Shunsuke Baba =

Japanese fencer

Personal information
- Native name: 馬場 俊輔
- Nationality: Japanese
- Born: 23 September 2002 (age 24) Ibigawa, Gifu, Japan

Fencing career
- Handedness: Left-handed
- Sport: Fencing
- Weapon: Foil
- Club: Gifu Club
Medal record
Representing Japan
Asian Games
Gold medal – first place	2026 Aichi-Nagoya	Team
Asian Fencing Championships
Gold medal – first place	2025 Bali	Men's team
Gold medal – first place	2026 New Delhi	Men's team

Shunsuke Baba (Japanese: 馬場 俊輔, born 23 September 2002) is a Japanese fencing athlete who competes in foil. He represents Japan internationally and is affiliated with Chuo University and Gifu Club.

Baba won gold medals in the men's team foil at the 2025 Asian Fencing Championships, the 2026 Asian Fencing Championships and the 2026 Asian Games in Aichi-Nagoya. He was also a member of the Japanese team that finished fifth in the men's team foil at the 2025 World Fencing Championships.

== Career ==
Baba was born on 23 September 2002 in Ibigawa, Gifu. He graduated from Ogaki Minami High School and entered the Faculty of Law at Chuo University in April 2021.

Baba competes in men's foil and is left-handed. He made his international breakthrough in senior competition during the 2025 season. At the 2025 Asian Fencing Championships in Bali, Indonesia, he helped Japan win the men's team foil gold medal. He finished 23rd in the individual foil event.

At the 2025 World Fencing Championships in Tbilisi, Georgia, Baba finished 49th in the individual men's foil event and helped Japan finish fifth in the team competition.

During the 2025–26 season, Baba recorded several international results on the FIE circuit. He finished eighth at the 2026 FIE Grand Prix in Turin, Italy, and was ranked among the leading Japanese foil fencers.

At the 2026 Asian Fencing Championships in New Delhi, India, Baba was part of Japan's men's foil team that won the gold medal. The Japanese team defeated Hong Kong 45–39 in the final. Baba also reached the quarter-finals of the individual foil event, where he lost to South Korea's Youn Jeong-hyun 12–15.

At the 2026 Asian Games in Aichi-Nagoya, Japan, Baba won the gold medal in the men's team foil as part of the Japanese team with Kazuki Iimura, Kyosuke Matsuyama and Toshiya Saito. Japan defeated Hong Kong in the final to win the event.
