= Marco Vannini =

Italian zoologist

Marco Vannini (born March 3, 1943, in Florence) is Professor of Invertebrate Zoology at the Department of Evolutionary Biology L. Pardi of the University of Florence. He has been the Director of the above Department from 1989 to 1992 and the Director of the Museum of Zoology of the University of Florence, from 1992 to 2003. He is member of the coordination board of Doctorate in Ethology and Ecology, at the University of Florence, member of the Centre for the Study of Tropical Faunistics and Ecology of CNR, from 1970 to 2003. He is the author of about 120 papers on international journals of zoology, ethology, marine biology and marine ecology.

Research topics : behaviour and biology of crustacean decapods, ecology and population genetics of Indo-pacific mangrove fauna, ecology of tropical and Mediterranean rocky shores, problems of biodiversity and conservation

Since 1970 he has organized or participated in about 45 research expeditions in several sites of the Western Indian Ocean, mostly in Somalia and Kenya.
