= Alex Tofalides =

Cypriot fencer (born 1993)

Alexander Tofalides
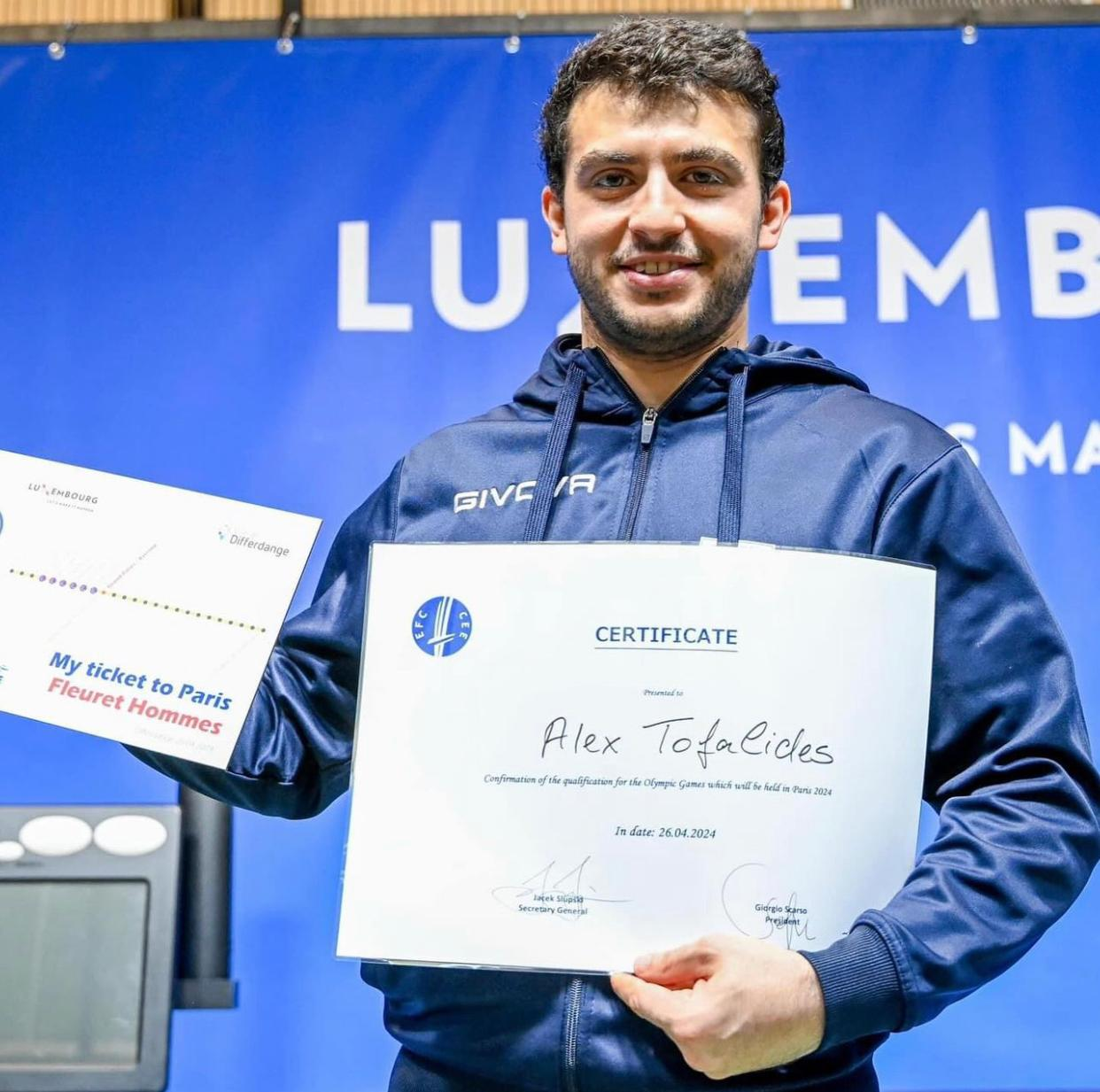
- Alexander Tofalides at a competition

Personal information
- Full name: Alexander Andreas Tofalides
- Nickname: Alex
- Nationality: Cyprus, United Kingdom
- Born: March 13, 1993 (age 33) London, England
- Height: 175 cm (5 ft 9 in)
- Weight: 70 kg (154 lb)

Fencing career
- Sport: Fencing
- Weapon: Foil
- Hand: Left-handed
- Club: Inspion Sports

Alexander Andreas Tofalides (born March 13, 1993) is a Cypriot fencer specializing in the foil. He qualified for the 2024 Summer Olympics, becoming the first fencer to represent Cyprus at the Olympic Games.

== Early life and education ==
Tofalides was born in London, England. He began fencing at the age of seven. He balanced his fencing career with his academic pursuits at University College London (BA 2015) and the London School of Economics and Political Science (MSc 2017).

== Fencing career ==
=== Youth competitions ===
Tofalides represented Great Britain at the 2010 Summer Youth Olympics, finishing in seventh place in the individual boys' foil event. Representing Great Britain until 2016, he was Individual Senior British Champion in 2013, World Cup Bronze Medalist with Great Britain in Bonn 2014, and gold medalist at the 2015 European Games in Baku with Team GB.

=== Transition to Cyprus ===
Switching to represent Cyprus, a decision he made to honor his late Cypriot father and grandparents, Tofalides won his first gold medal at the FIE Men's Foil Competition Satellite in Antalya, Turkey, in 2016. His performances have significantly raised the profile of fencing in Cyprus.

=== Olympic qualification ===
At the Tokyo 2020 European Olympic Qualifying event, Tofalides lost in the final to qualify for the Olympics. Three years later, Tofalides secured his place at the 2024 Summer Olympics in Paris by winning the Europe Zonal Qualifying Tournament held in Differdange, Luxembourg, securing the sole foil quota available to fencers from nations without a previously qualified athlete or team. This achievement marked a historic moment as he became the first Cypriot fencer to qualify for the Olympic Games.

== Style and technique ==
Tofalides is known for his determination and famously beat Marcus Mepstead 4–1 in the British Championships, demonstrating his strategic and tactical versatility. His ability to read opponents and adapt his tactics mid-bout has been key to his success. He continues to refine his skills under the guidance of top coaches.

== Personal life ==
Beyond fencing, Tofalides is committed to promoting sports among the youth in Cyprus. He is also an advocate for mental health awareness, emphasizing the importance of psychological well-being for athletes.

== Achievements ==
- (Singapore) 2010 Summer Youth Olympics: 7th place (individual boys' foil)
- 🥇 2016 FIE Men's Foil Competition Satellite Antalya, Turkey: Gold Medal
