= Ali Nassar =

Arab-Israeli film director (born 1954)

Ali Nassar (Arabic: علي نصار, Hebrew: עלי נסאר; born 1954) is an Arab-Israeli film director. Nassar was born in the Galilee village of Arraba, and graduated from the University of Moscow in 1981 with a degree in film. Returning to Haifa, he started a theatre group and also worked as a photographer for a daily newspaper.

== See also ==
- Cinema of Israel

== Filmography ==
- (1993): The Babysitter
- (1997): The Milky Way
- (2002): In the 9th Month
- (2008): Whispering Embers
- (2015): Lechudim Betoch HaReshet
