= Edoardo Luperi =

Italian foil fencer (born 1993)

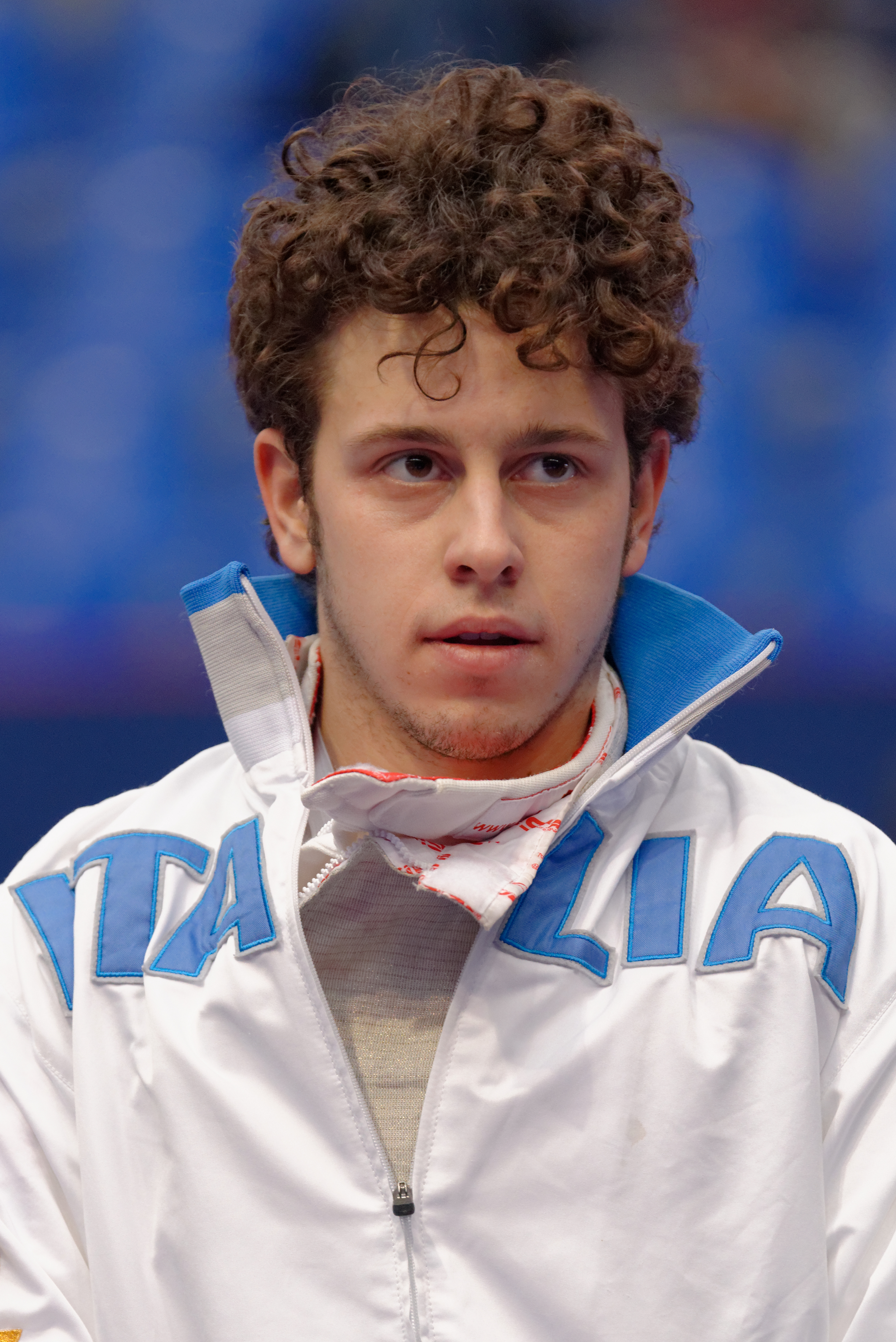

Personal information
- Born: 11 September 1993 (age 33) Livorno
- Height: 1.70 m (5 ft 7 in)
- Weight: 67 kg (148 lb)

Fencing career
- Sport: Fencing
- Country: Italy
- Weapon: foil
- Hand: left-handed
- National coach: Andrea Cipressa
- Club: Fiamme Oro
- Head coach: Marco Vannini
- FIE ranking: current ranking
Medal record
European Championships
Bronze medal – third place	2015 Montreux	Individual

Edoardo Luperi (born 11 September 1993) is an Italian foil fencer, bronze medallist at the 2015 European Championships and Italian champion in 2011 and 2012.

== Career ==
Luperi began fencing in 1998 at CS Fides Livorno. He posted his first success in 2005 with the Italian national U14 title. Marco Vannini took him as a student the following year. Luperi won a double gold medal in the 2009 Cadet European Championships in Bourges, followed by an individual gold at the Cadet World Championships in Belfast. He earned another Cadet Word silver medal in Baku in 2010 after losing in the final to USA's Alexander Massialas. This result qualified him to the 2010 Summer Youth Olympics in Singapore. He took another double gold, first in the individual event, this time defeating Massialas in the final, then with Europe 1 in the mixed team event. In 2011 he won both the Junior World title at the Dead Sea and the Junior World Cup series.

In 2010, for his first senior season, Luperi reached the quarter-finals in the Montreal World Cup. In 2011, at the age of 17, he became the youngest national champion in the history of Italian fencing by defeating in the final Giorgio Avola. He repeated this feat in 2012, prevailing this time over team Olympic champion Andrea Baldini. Luperi was called in the Italian national team in 2012 for the Havana World Cup and earned with them a team gold medal. He climbed his first World Cup podium with a bronze medal in the 2014 San Francisco World Cup, after losing in the semifinals to France's Jérémy Cadot. At the 2015 European Championships he earned a bronze medal after being defeated in the semi-finals by teammate Daniele Garozzo.
