= Dániel Dósa =

Hungarian fencer (born 1996)

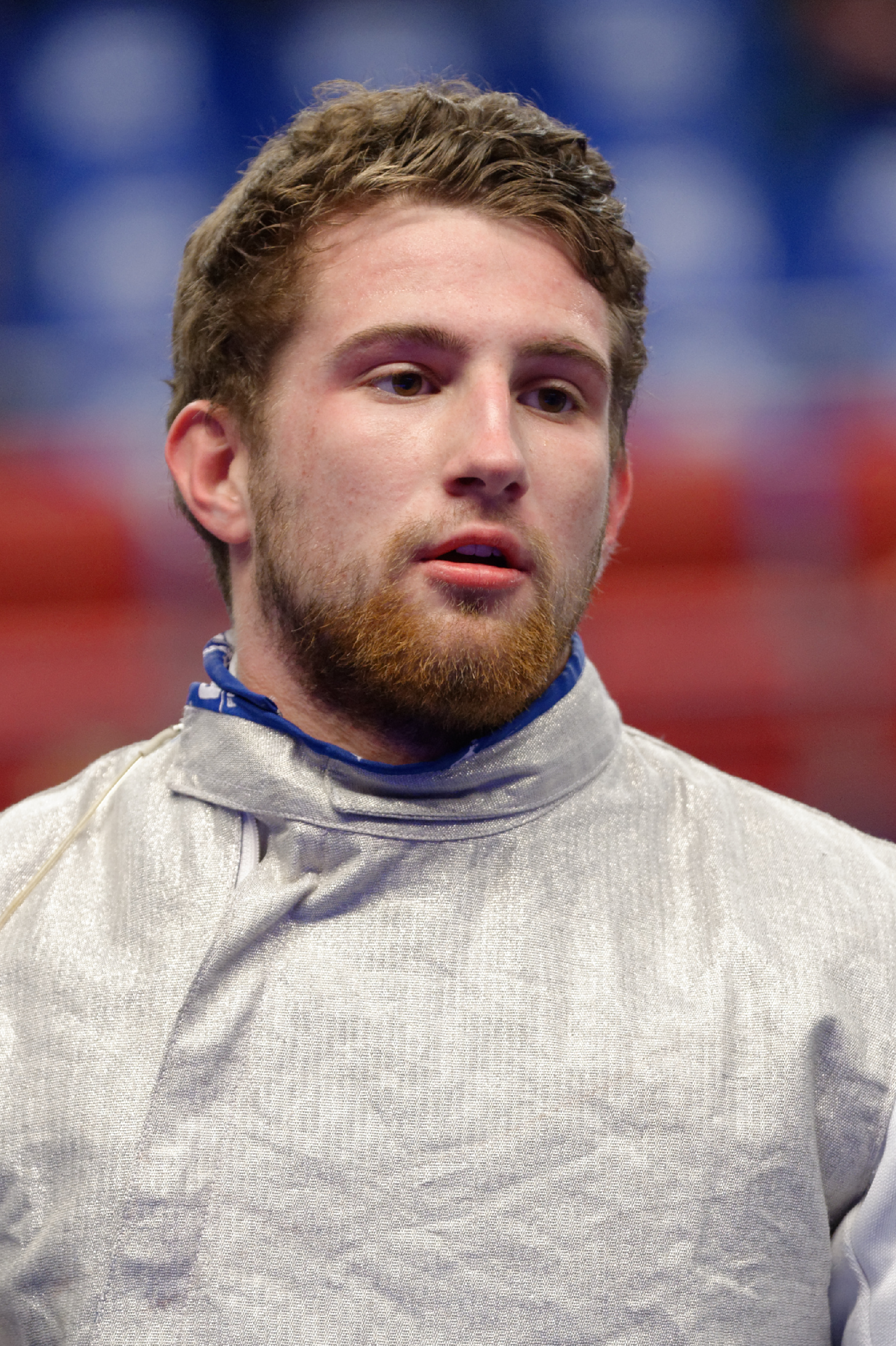
- Dósa in 2017

Personal information
- Born: 19 January 1996 (age 30) Hungary

Fencing career
- Sport: Fencing
- Country: Hungary
- Weapon: Foil
- Hand: Left-handed
- Club: Törekvés SE
- FIE ranking: current ranking
Medal record
Representing Hungary
World Championships
Bronze medal – third place	2025 Tbilisi	Team
Bronze medal – third place	2026 Hong Kong	Individual
European Championships
Silver medal – second place	2024 Basel	Team
European Junior Championships
Silver medal – second place	2014 Jerusalem	Team
Silver medal – second place	2015 Maribor	Individual
European Cadet Championships
Bronze medal – third place	2013 Budapest	Individual

Dániel Dósa (born 19 January 1996) is a Hungarian left-handed foil fencer.

== Career ==
He won the individual bronze medal at the 2013 European Cadet Championships in Budapest, and placed fourth in the team event. In European Junior Championships he won two silver medals: one in the team event in 2014, Jerusalem, and one in the individual event in 2015, Maribor. In 2024, he was part of the team that won the silver medal at the European Championships team event. He represented Hungary at the 2024 Summer Olympics.

== Medal record ==
=== World championship ===
Year	Location	Event	Position
2025	(Georgia (country)) Tbilisi, Georgia	Team Men's Foil	3rd
