= Lee Kwang-hyun (fencer) =

South Korean fencer (born 1993)

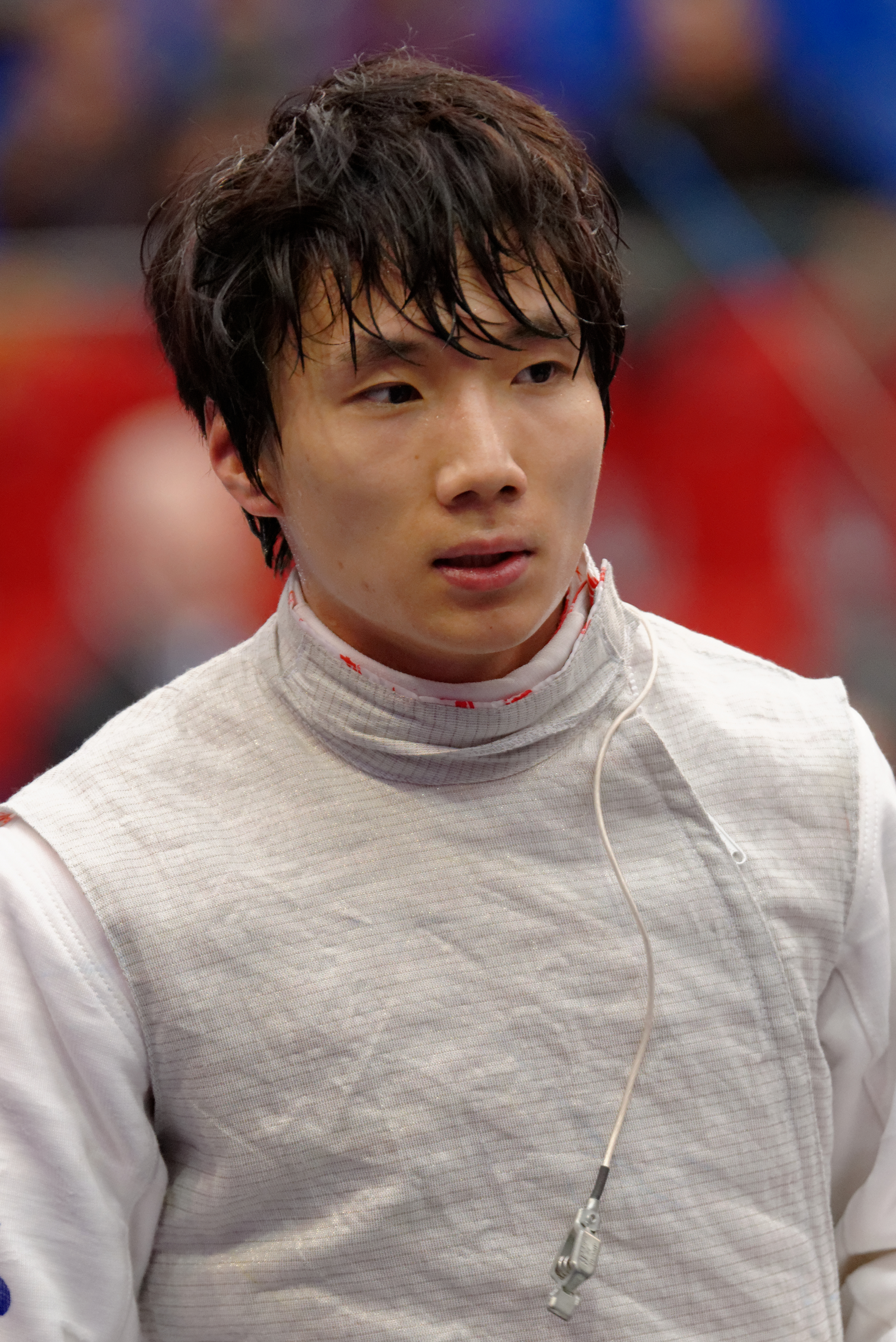
- Lee Kwang-hyun in 2015

Personal information
- Born: 17 August 1993 (age 33)

Fencing career
- Sport: Fencing
- Country: South Korea
- Weapon: Foil
- Hand: Right-handed
Medal record
Men's foil fencing
Representing South Korea
Asian Games
Gold medal – first place	2018 Jakarta	Team
Gold medal – first place	2022 Hangzhou	Team
Bronze medal – third place	2026 Aichi-Nagoya	Team
Asian Championships
Silver medal – second place	2024 Kuwait City	Team

Lee Kwang-hyun (born 17 August 1993) is a South Korean fencer. He won the gold medal in the men's team foil event at the 2018 Asian Games held in Jakarta, Indonesia.

In 2017, he competed in fencing at the Summer Universiade held in Taipei, Taiwan. He competed in the men's individual foil and men's team foil events.
