= Maximilien Chastanet =

French fencer (born 1996)

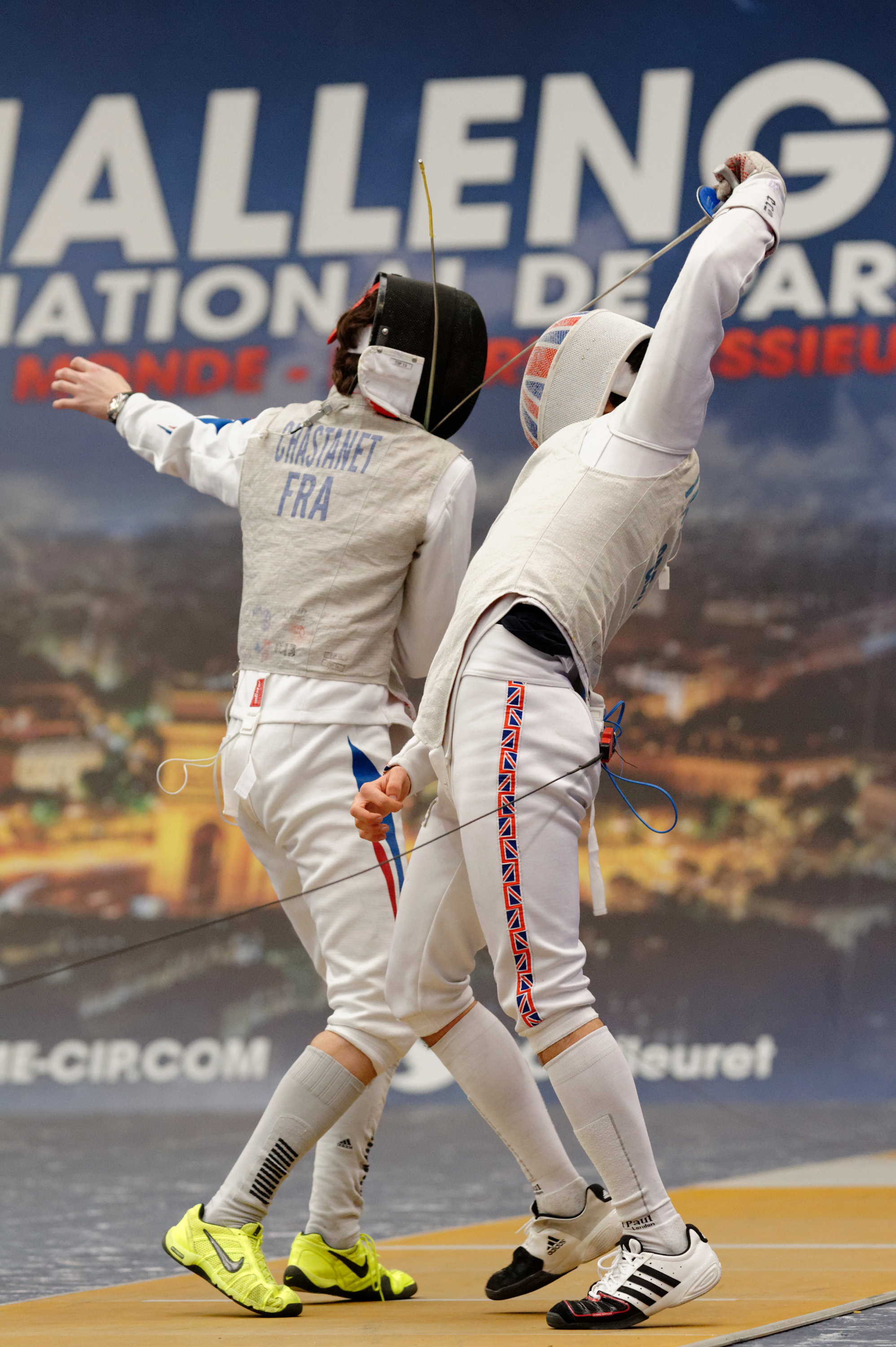

Personal information
- Nationality: France
- Born: 15 March 1996 (age 30) Le Havre
Medal record
Men's fencing
Representing France
Olympic Games
Bronze medal – third place	2024 Paris	Team
Junior World Championships
Bronze medal – third place	2015 Tashkent	Team

Maximilien Chastanet (born 15 March 1996) is a French fencer. He won the bronze medal in the men's team foil event at the 2024 Summer Olympics.
