= Dmytro Chuchukalo =

Ukrainian foil fencer

Personal information
- Nationality: Ukraine
- Born: Дмитро Чучукало; 5 October 1995 (age 30)

Fencing career
- Sport: Fencing
- Weapon: Foil
- Hand: left-handed
Medal record
Summer Universiade
Gold medal – first place	2017 Taipei	Foil

Dmytro Chuchukalo (Ukrainian: Дмитро Чучукало; born October 5, 1995) is a Ukrainian foil fencer.

He is champion of the 2017 Summer Universiade in men's foil individual competition.

Chuchukalo is a student at the Kyiv National University of Physical Education and Sport of Ukraine.

== Links ==
- Profile at the European Fencing Confederation
