= Wu Junhao =

Chinese association football player

Personal information
- Date of birth: 11 December 2004 (age 21)
- Place of birth: Wuhan, Hubei, China
- Height: 1.66 m (5 ft 5 in)
- Position: Midfielder

Team information
- Current team: Wuhan Three Towns B
- Number: 11

Youth career
- –2021: Guangzhou Evergrande

Senior career*
Years	Team	Apps	(Gls)
2021–2022	Guangzhou FC	1	(0)
2023	Jinan Xingzhou	22	(0)
2024–2025	Qingdao Red Lions	47	(1)
2026–	Wuhan Three Towns B	0	(0)
- * Club domestic league appearances and goals as of 01:12, 9 March 2026 (UTC)

Wu Junhao (Chinese: 吴俊豪; born 11 December 2004) is a Chinese footballer currently playing as a midfielder for China League Two club Wuhan Three Towns B.

== Career statistics ==
=== Club ===
As of 25 June 2021.

Club	Season	League			Cup		Continental		Other		Total	
Club	Season	Division	Apps	Goals	Apps	Goals	Apps	Goals	Apps	Goals	Apps	Goals
Guangzhou FC	2021	Chinese Super League	0	0	0	0	1 (Note: Appearances in the AFC Champions League)	0	0	0	1	0
Career total			0	0	0	0	0	0	0	0	1	0
