= Choi Hyun-soo =

South Korean journalist

- 최현수

Spokesperson of Ministry of National Defense
- In office 11 December 2017 – 30 June 2020
- President: Moon Jae-in
- Minister: Song Young-moo; Jeong Kyeong-doo; Suh Wook
- Preceded by: Moon Sang-gyun
- Succeeded by: Boo Seung-chan

Personal details
- Born: 3 April 1960 (age 66)
- Education: Yonsei University; University of Chicago

Choi Hyun-soo (Korean: 최현수; born 3 April 1960) is a South Korean journalist who previously served as the Spokesperson of the Ministry of National Defense from 2017 to 2020 - the first woman to assume this post in the Ministry's history.

Choi was previously the first woman to become the Ministry correspondent in 2002 and a military specialist in 2009 respectively. Before resigning for her new career in public service, she had worked as a journalist at Kukmin Ilbo for almost three decades from 1988.

She hosted a television show at the Ministry-run media agency and completed a doctorate programme at the Ministry-run Korea National Defense University.

Choi retired from post in June 2020. A year later she was brought back to public service as the head of Defense Agency for Spiritual & Mental Force Enhancement of the Ministry.

She holds two degrees - a bachelor in political science from Yonsei University and a master's in international relations from University of Chicago.

== Awards ==
- The 28th Choi Eun-hee Female Journalist Award (2011)
- Award from Korean Women Journalist Association (2011)
