= Kyosuke Matsuyama =

Japanese fencer (born 1996)

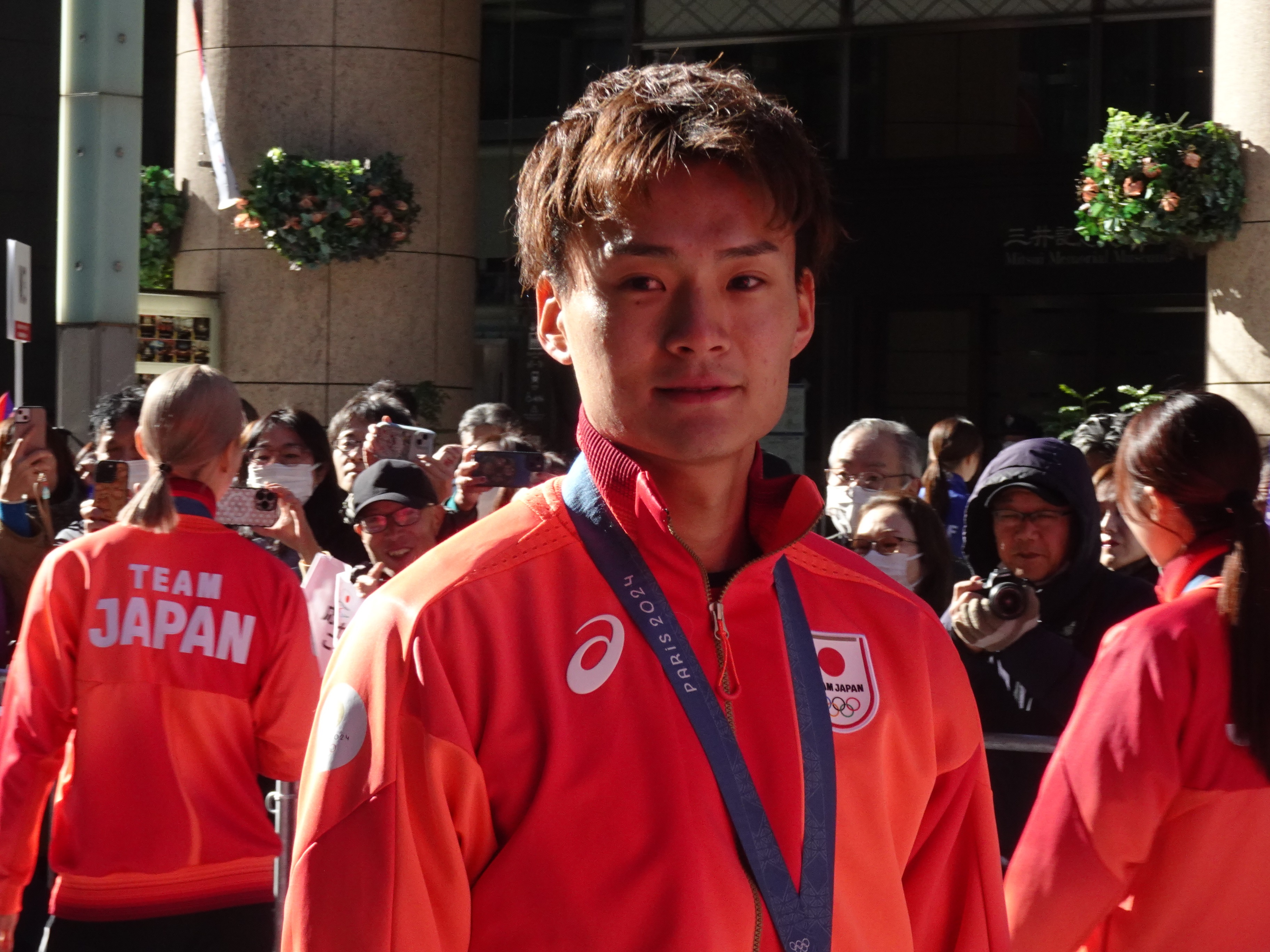
- Matsuyama at Paris 2024 Summer Olympians and Paralympians Japan National Team parade event on November 30th, 2024

Personal information
- Born: 19 December 1996 (age 29) Tokyo, Japan

Fencing career
- Sport: Fencing
- Country: Japan
- Weapon: Foil
- Hand: Left-handed
- National coach: Erwann Le Pechoux
- FIE ranking: Current ranking
Medal record
Men's foil
Representing Japan
Olympic Games
Gold medal – first place	2024 Paris	Team
World Championships
Gold medal – first place	2023 Milan	Team
Bronze medal – third place	2023 Milan	Individual
Asian Games
Gold medal – first place	2026 Aichi-Nagoya	Team
Bronze medal – third place	2018 Jakarta	Team
Bronze medal – third place	2022 Hangzhou	Team
Bronze medal – third place	2026 Aichi–Nagoya	Individual
Asian Championships
Gold medal – first place	2024 Kuwait City	Individual
Gold medal – first place	2023 Wuxi	Team
Gold medal – first place	2022 Seoul	Team
Gold medal – first place	2019 Chiba	Team
Bronze medal – third place	2024 Kuwait City	Team
Bronze medal – third place	2018 Bangkok	Team
Bronze medal – third place	2017 Hong Kong	Team
Bronze medal – third place	2016 Wuxi	Team

Kyosuke Matsuyama (松山恭助, Matsuyama Kyōsuke, born 19 December 1996) is a Japanese fencer. He won one of the bronze medals in the men's foil event at the 2023 World Fencing Championships held in Milan, Italy.

== Career ==
In 2017, he won the silver medal in the men's individual foil event at the Summer Universiade held in Taipei, Taiwan. He also won the gold medal in the men's team foil event.

He won one of the bronze medals in the men's team foil event at the 2018 Asian Games held in Jakarta, Indonesia.
